= 1960 Birthday Honours =

British government recognitions

The Queen's Birthday Honours 1960 were appointments in many of the Commonwealth realms of Queen Elizabeth II to various orders and honours to reward and highlight good works by citizens of those countries. They were announced in supplements to the London Gazette of 3 June 1960 for the United Kingdom, Australia, New Zealand, Ghana, and the Federation of Rhodesia and Nyasaland.

At this time honours for Australians were awarded both in the United Kingdom honours, on the advice of the premiers of Australian states, and in a separate Australia honours list.

The recipients of honours are displayed here as they were styled before their new honour, and arranged by honour, with classes (Knight, Knight Grand Cross, etc.) and then divisions (Military, Civil, etc.) as appropriate.

== United Kingdom and Commonwealth ==
=== Viscount ===
- Field-Marshal Sir William Joseph Slim, KG, GCB, GCMG, GCVO, GBE, DSO, MC, lately Governor-General of Australia.

=== Baron ===
- Basil Sanderson, MC. For services to industrial relations in the shipping industry.

=== Privy Councillor ===
- Cuthbert James McCall Alport, TD, MP, Member of Parliament for Colchester since 1950. Assistant Postmaster-General, 1955–1957; Parliamentary Under-Secretary of State, Commonwealth Relations Office, 1957–1959; Minister of State, Commonwealth Relations Office, since 1959.
- Frederick James Erroll, MP, Member of Parliament for Altrincham and Sale since 1945. Parliamentary Secretary to Ministry of Supply, 1955–1956, and to Board of Trade, 1956–1958; Economic Secretary to HM Treasury, 1958–1959; Minister of State, Board of Trade, since 1959.

=== Baronet ===
- Major Thomas Philip Barber, DSO, TD, DL. For public services in Nottinghamshire.
- Sir Herbert Walter Butcher, MP, Member of Parliament for Holland-with-Boston since 1937. A Lord Commissioner of HM Treasury and Joint Deputy Government Chief Whip, 1951–1953. Chief Whip, Liberal Unionist Parliamentary Group, 1945–1951 and since 1953. Vice-Chairman, National Liberal Organisation since 1952. For political and public services.
- Major Sir (Ernest) Guy Richard Lloyd, DSO, DL, Member of Parliament for East Renfrew, 1940–1959. For political and public services.
- Sir Kenneth Dugald Stewart, GBE, Chairman, Trustee Savings Banks Associations.

=== Knight Bachelor ===
- Robert Stevenson Aitken, Vice-Chancellor, University of Birmingham.
- Reginald Pridham Baulkwill, CBE, Public Trustee.
- John Maxwell Bemrose. For political and public services in the East Midlands.
- Frank Bower, CBE, President, Association of British Chambers of Commerce.
- Walter Eric Chiesman, CB, MD, FRCP, Medical Adviser, HM Treasury.
- Alderman Harold Clowes, OBE, JP, Lord Mayor of Stoke-on-Trent.
- George Beresford Craddock, MP, Member of Parliament for the Spelthorne Division since 1950. For political and public services.
- John Goronwy Edwards, Director, Institute of Historical Research and Professor of History, University of London.
- Colonel William Heneage Wynne Finch, MC, lately HM Lieutenant of the County of Caernarvon.
- Percy Llewellyn Hunting, Chairman, Hunting Group of Companies.
- Richard Hugh Jessel, lately Deputy Chairman, Export Credits Advisory Council.
- Edgar Mayne Keatinge, CBE, Member of Parliament for Bury St. Edmunds, 1944–1945. For political and public services in Suffolk and Wessex.
- Malcolm McLeod McCulloch, CBE, lately Chief Constable, City Police, Glasgow.
- William Hunter McFadzean, President, Federation of British Industries.
- Commander John Francis Whitaker Maitland, DL, MP, Royal Navy (Retd), Member of Parliament for the Horncastle Division since 1945. For political and public services.
- Thomas Neame, MBE, Horticulturist. For services to fruit growing.
- John Samuel Richardson, MVO, MD, FRCP, Physician, St Thomas' Hospital.
- Benjamin William Rycroft, OBE, MD, FRCS, Consulting Ophthalmic Surgeon.
- Samuel Isidore Salmon. For political and public services in London.
- Basil Ferdinand Jamieson Schonland, CBE, Director, Research Group, United Kingdom Atomic Energy Authority.
- Andrew Smith, Alderman, CBE, Chairman, Lancashire County Council.
- Basil Urwin Spence, OBE, TD, President, Royal Institute of British Architects.
- Gordon Brims Black McIvor Sutherland, Director, National Physical Laboratory.
- Henry Gerard Thornton, Foreign Secretary, The Royal Society.
- Edward George Tucker, Controller of Death Duties, Board of Inland Revenue.
- William Holmes Lister Urton, MBE, TD, General Director of the Conservative and Unionist Central Office since 1957. For political services.
- Wilfred Douglas Vernon, Chairman, Spillers, Ltd.
- Frederick John West, OBE. For political services in Middlesex and Essex.

State of Victoria

- The Honourable Arthur Dean, Judge of the Supreme Court of the State of Victoria.

State of Queensland

- James Arthur Holt, Co-ordinator General of Public Works, State of Queensland.

State of South Australia

- Ferdinand Caire Drew, CMG, Under Treasurer, State of South Australia.

State of Western Australia

- Lawrence Percival Gadsdon, President of the Local Government Association, State of Western Australia.

Commonwealth Relations

- Brigadier Matthew Henry Cox, CIE, OBE, MC, Indian Army (retired), formerly Additional Director-General of Ordnance Factories in India; for services in connection with development projects in India.
- Thomas Vaisey Scrivenor, CMG, Deputy High Commissioner for Basutoland, the Bechuanaland Protectorate and Swaziland.

Overseas Territories

- Chau Sik-nin, CBE. For public services in Hong Kong.
- Marie Charles Emmanuel Clement Nageon De Lestang, Chief Justice of the High Court of Lagos and the Southern Cameroons.
- Hallam Grey Massiah, CBE. For public services in Barbados.
- Odumegwu Ojukwu, OBE. For public services in the Eastern Region, Nigeria.
- Olagbegi II, The Olowo of Owo. For public services in the Western Region, Nigeria.
- Alfred Baillie Rennie, Federal Justice, The West Indies.
- Arthur Trenham Weatherhead, CMG, Deputy Governor, Northern Region, Nigeria.
- Ralph Windham, formerly Justice of Appeal, Eastern African Court of Appeal, now Chief Justice, Tanganyika.

=== Order of the Bath ===
==== Knight Grand Cross of the Order of the Bath (GCB) ====
Military Division

- Admiral Sir Caspar John, KCB.

==== Knight Commander of the Order of the Bath (KCB) ====
Military Division

- Vice-Admiral Wilfrid John Wentworth Woods, CB, DSO.
- Lieutenant-General Ian Hurry Riches, CB, DSO.
- Lieutenant-General Sir James Newton Rodney Moore, KCVO, CB, CBE, DSO, (32071), late Foot Guards.

Civil Division

- Frank Chalton Francis, CB, Director and Principal Librarian, British Museum.
- Alfred John Sims, OBE, Director-General, Ships, Admiralty.

==== Companion of the Order of the Bath (CB) ====
Military Division

Royal Navy

- Rear-Admiral The Right Honourable David Charles, Earl Cairns.
- Rear-Admiral Edmund Neville Vincent Currey, DSO, DSC.
- Rear-Admiral John Grant, DSO.
- Rear-Admiral John Graham Hamilton, CBE.
- Rear-Admiral Edmund Thomas Larken, OBE.
- Major-General Reginald Carteret de Mussenden Leathes, MVO, OBE.
- Rear-Admiral Michael Le Fanu, DSC.
- Rear-Admiral Ernest Mill, OBE.
- Surgeon Vice-Admiral William Robert Silvester Panckridge, QHP, MRCS, LRCP.
- Surgeon Rear-Admiral Dermot Francis Walsh, OBE, QHS, FRCS(Ed), MB.

Army

- Major-General Gilbert Thomas Lancelot Archer, QHS, MB, MRCP(I), (39082), late Royal Army Medical Corps.
- Major-General Eric Stuart Cole, CBE, (33651), late Royal Corps of Signals.
- Major-General John French (41109), late Royal Armoured Corps.
- Major-General Frederick Clarence Campbell Graham, DSO, (41133), late Infantry Colonel, The Argyll and Sutherland Highlanders (Princess Louise's).
- Major-General William Dillon Hughes, CBE, QHP, MD, FRCP(I), (40252), late Royal Army Medical Corps.
- Major-General Basil Douglas Jones, CBE, (28281), Royal Army Ordnance Corps (now R.A.R.O.).
- Major-General Henry Maughan Liardet, CBE, DSO, (31303), late Royal Armoured Corps.
- Major-General Denis Grattan Moore (41234), late Infantry.
- Major-General Richard Henry Littleton Wheeler, CBE, (34344), late Royal Regiment of Artillery.

Royal Air Force

- Air Vice-Marshal Colin Scragg, CBE, AFC.
- Acting Air Vice-Marshal Ronald Arthur Ramsay Rae, OBE.
- Air Commodore Ord Denny Allerton, CBE.
- Air Commodore Herbert Waldemar Mermagen, CBE, AFC.
- Air Commodore John Nicholas Haworth Whitworth, DSO, DFC.
- Acting Air Commodore James Anthony Leathart, DSO.
- Group Captain Deryck Cameron Stapleton, CBE, DFC, AFC.

Civil Division

- Frederick Arthur Bishop, CVO, Deputy Secretary of the Cabinet.
- John Stirling Brunton, HM Senior Chief Inspector of Schools, Scottish Education Department.
- Percy John Curtis, CBE, Secretary, Exchequer and Audit Department.
- Owen Francis, Under-Secretary, Ministry of Power.
- Frank Hollins, Under-Secretary, Ministry of Agriculture, Fisheries and Food.
- Morris Mackintosh Ord Johnstone, Under-Secretary, Office of the Registrar of Restrictive Trading Agreements.
- Frederick Measham Lea, CBE, Director, Building Research Station, Department of Scientific and Industrial Research.
- James Stuart McPetrie, Director-General of Electronics Research and Development, Ministry of Aviation.
- William Nicholson McWilliam, Permanent Secretary, Ministry of Labour and National Insurance, Northern Ireland.
- Thomas George Talbot, QC, Counsel to the Chairman of Committees, House of Lords.
- John Martindale Wilson, Under-Secretary, Ministry of Defence.
- George Kennedy Young, CMG, MBE, Under-Secretary, Foreign Office.

=== Order of Saint Michael and Saint George ===
==== Knight Grand Cross of the Order of St Michael and St George (GCMG) ====
- Sir Kenneth Roberts-Wray, KCMG, QC, Legal Adviser, Commonwealth Relations Office and Colonial Office.

==== Knight Commander of the Order of St Michael and St George (KCMG) ====
- Horace Algernon Fraser Rumbold, CMG, CIE, Deputy Under-Secretary of State, Commonwealth Relations Office.
- Arthur Wendell Snelling, CMG, High Commissioner for the United Kingdom in Ghana.
- Alexander Montgomery Wilson Rae, CMG, MD, ChB, Medical Adviser to the Secretary of State for the Colonies.
- Michael Justin Creswell, CMG, Her Majesty's Ambassador Extraordinary and Plenipotentiary in Belgrade.
- Samuel, Viscount Hood, CMG, Minister, Her Majesty's Embassy, Washington.
- Roderick Wallis Parkes, CMG, OBE, lately Her Majesty's Ambassador Extraordinary and Plenipotentiary in Saigon.

==== Companion of the Order of St Michael and St George (CMG) ====
- Harold Bailey, United Kingdom Senior Trade Commissioner, India.
- Ronald Stuart Symons, CIE, Assistant Secretary, HM Treasury.
- Brigadier Croxton Sillery Vale, CBE, MC, Regional Director (at Arras, France), Northern Region, Commonwealth War Graves Commission.
- Arthur Franklyn Williams, Assistant Secretary, Ministry of Power.
- Kenneth Johnstone Binns, Under Treasurer of the State of Tasmania.
- Robert Peter Fawcus, OBE, Resident Commissioner, Bechuanaland Protectorate.
- Richard Henry Francis, General Secretary, Dairymen's Organisation, State of Queensland.
- Norman Frederick Mitchell, a Judge of the County Court, State of Victoria; President, Royal Agricultural Society of Victoria.
- Harold Goodhew Turner, formerly Principal Establishment Officer, Federation of Malaya, now Secretary to the Federal Treasury.
- Michael David Irving Gass, Chief Secretary, Western Pacific High Commission.
- Iain Gilbert Gunn, Resident, Sokoto Province, Northern Region, Nigeria.
- John Leslie Von der Heyde, CBE, MC, Chairman, Public Service Commission, Tanganyika.
- Lieutenant-Colonel The Honourable Henry Anthony Camillo Howard, Administrator, St. Kitts-Nevis-Anguilla.
- Richard Edmonds Luyt, DCM, Permanent Secretary, Ministry of Education, Labour and Lands, Kenya.
- Alastair James McIntosh, OBE, Resident Adviser and British Agent, Eastern Aden Protectorate.
- Dermod Art Felly Murphy, OBE, Commissioner for Special Duties, Western Region, Nigeria.
- John Horace Parry, MBE, Principal of University College, Ibadan, Western Region, Nigeria.
- Henry Ellis Isidore Phillips, MBE, Financial Secretary, Nyasaland.
- William Wenban-Smith, CBE, Minister for Education and Labour, Tanganyika.
- Peter Hyla Gawne Stallard, CVO, MBE, Secretary to the Prime Minister, Federation of Nigeria.
- Jeromi Oputa Udoji, Chief Secretary to the Premier, Eastern Region, Nigeria.
- Leonard George Coke Wallis, CIE, Chairman, Public Service Commission, Western Region, Nigeria.
- John Vernon Wild, OBE, Administrative Secretary, Uganda.
- Guy Trayton Barton, OBE, Chief Secretary, Barbados.
- Ellis Emmanuel Innocent Clarke, Attorney-General, Trinidad.
- Randall Erskine Ellison, ED, Chairman, Public Service Commission, Northern Region, Nigeria.
- Alec Cecil Stanley Adams, CBE, Counsellor and Consul-General, Her Majesty's Embassy, Bangkok.
- Colonel John George Figgess, OBE, Military Attaché, Her Majesty's Embassy, Tokyo.
- Joseph Francis Ford, OBE, Her Majesty's Consul-General, Hanoi.
- Marie Ferdinand Philippe Herchenroder, CBE, British Judge, Supreme Restitution Court, Herford.
- Kenneth Herbert Huggins, Counsellor (Commercial), Her Majesty's Embassy, Washington.
- Robert William Fairfield Johnston, CBE, MC, TD, Counsellor, United Kingdom Delegation to the North Atlantic Treaty Organisation, Paris.
- Frederick Cecil Mason, Counsellor (Economic), Her Majesty's Embassy, Tehran.
- Thomas Richard Shaw, Foreign Office.
- Edward Emile Tomkins, CVO, Foreign Office.
- Paul Hervé Giraud Wright, OBE, Foreign Office.

=== Royal Victorian Order ===
==== Knight Commander of the Royal Victorian Order (KCVO) ====
- Ronald Montague Joseph Harris, CB, MVO.

==== Commander of the Royal Victorian Order (CVO) ====
- Major Michael Babington Charles Hawkins, MVO, MBE.
- Group Captain George James Horatio Jeffs, MVO, OBE.
- Wladimir Kleinmichel, MVO.
- David Stephens.

==== Member of the Royal Victorian Order (MVO) ====
At this time the two lowest classes of the Royal Victorian Order were "Member (fourth class)" and "Member (fifth class)", both with post-nominal letters MVO. "Member (fourth class)" was renamed "Lieutenant" (LVO) from the 1985 New Year Honours onwards.

Fourth Class

- William Horace Fisher.
- Deputy Commander Evan William Jones, Metropolitan Police.
- Wing Commander Herbert Brian Kelly, MD, MRCS, Royal Air Force.
- Commander Nigel Hugh Malim, Royal Navy.
- Chief Superintendent Albert Edward Perkins, MVO, Metropolitan Police.
- Wing Commander Albert Ernest Sims, OBE, Royal Air Force.
- Phil John Turner.

Fifth Class

- Albert Edward Bigden.
- Kathleen Maud Devers.
- Enid Price Hill.
- Superintendent Frank Kelley, BEM, Metropolitan Police.
- Captain Norman Henry Morgan, MM.
- Ephraim James Rainbow.
- Derek Roy Waters.

=== Order of the British Empire ===
==== Knight Grand Cross of the Order of the British Empire (GBE) ====
Military Division

- General Sir Cecil Sugden, KCB, CBE, (27005), Colonel Commandant, Corps of Royal Engineers.

Civil Division

- The Right Honourable John Walgrave Halford, Baron Cottesloe, TD. For services to the Arts.

==== Dame Commander of the Order of the British Empire (DBE) ====
Military Division

- Commandant Evelyn Louisa Elizabeth Hoyer-Millar, OBE, Hon. ADC, Director, Women's Royal Naval Service.
- Air Commandant Alice Lowrey, RRC, QHNS, Princess Mary's Royal Air Force Nursing Service.

Civil Division

- Flora McKenzie Robson, CBE, Actress.
- Mary, Lady Herring, MB, BS. For social welfare services, especially in connection with Nursing organisations, in the State of Victoria.

==== Knight Commander of the Order of the British Empire (KBE) ====
Military Division

- Vice-Admiral Lancelot Arthur Babington Peile, CB, DSO, MVO.
- Major-General Nigel Prior Hanson Tapp, CB, CBE, DSO, (30558), late Royal Regiment of Artillery.
- Air Vice-Marshal Campion Aubrey Rumball, CBE, QHP, FRCP, MRCS, Royal Air Force.

Civil Division

- Major Edward Alexander Henry Legge-Bourke, DL, MP, Member of Parliament for the Isle of Ely since 1945. For political and public services.
- Air Vice-Marshal Willett Amalric Bowen Bowen-Buscarlet, CB, CBE, DFC, DL, Chairman, East Lancashire Territorial and Auxiliary Forces Association.
- Robert Cockburn, CB, OBE, Chief Scientist, Ministry of Aviation.
- Clifford Robertson King, CBE, Chairman, Electricity Council.
- Sir Richard Pike Pim, VRD, Inspector General, Royal Ulster Constabulary.
- Eric John Seward, CBE, British subject resident in Argentina.
- John Percival Summerscale, CBE, lately Minister (Commercial), Her Majesty's Embassy, Rio de Janeiro.
- Robert Edmund Alford, CMG, Governor and Commander-in-Chief, St. Helena.

==== Commander of the Order of the British Empire (CBE) ====
Military Division

Royal Navy

- Captain Paul Morrison Bushe Chavasse, DSC, ADC.
- The Right Reverend Monsignor Cyril Damian Fay, OBE, Chaplain.
- Colonel Henry Fraser Cranfield Kimpton, OBE, ADC, Royal Marines.
- Captain Eric Vernon St. John Morgan, DSC.
- Commodore Ralph William Frank Northcott, DSO.
- Captain Jacky Perks, DSC.
- Surgeon Captain (D) Alan Warwick Yates Price, LDS.

Army

- Major-General Henry Templer Alexander, DSO, OBE, (52569), late Infantry.
- Brigadier (temporary) George Lewis Williams Andrews, DSO, (44824), late Infantry (now R.A.R.O.).
- Brigadier Leslie Reginald Heber Keatinge, OBE, MB, (31039), late Royal Army Medical Corps.
- Brigadier Harold William Kitson (44917), late Corps of Royal Engineers.
- Colonel (acting) John Alexander Kirkpatrick Lamont, TD, (58658), Army Cadet Force.
- Brigadier (temporary) David Drummond Maurice McCready, DSO, OBE, (380237), late Gurkha Rifles.
- The Right Reverend Monsignor Bernard Navin, Chaplain to the Forces, First Class (101012), Royal Army Chaplains' Department.
- Brigadier Dennis John Edwin O'Flynn, DSO, MBE, (39352), late Royal Armoured Corps (now R.A.R.O.).
- Brigadier Alexander James Deas Ronald (17911), late Royal Regiment of Artillery (retired).
- Colonel Francis John Ronald, ERD, (67904), late Royal Army Educational Corps (now R.A.R.O.).
- Colonel Harold Scarisbrick (141193), Army Catering Corps.
- Brigadier John Cuthbert de Fontenne Sleeman, OBE, (47683), late Royal Armoured Corps.
- Colonel (acting) Christopher Castleton Smythe, OBE, MC, DL, (8623), Army Cadet Force.
- Major-General (temporary) Gerald Patrick Linton Weston, DSO, OBE, (49963), late Infantry.
- Brigadier Alwyne Michael Webster Whistler (44189), late Royal Corps of Signals.
- Colonel Norman William Schenke, OBE, (185919), Corps of Royal Electrical and Mechanical Engineers (now R.A.R.O.); formerly on loan to the Government of Pakistan.

Royal Air Force

- Air Commodore Gerard Ward McAleer, QHP, MB, BCh.
- Group Captain Frank Reginald Carey, DFC, AFC, DFM.
- Group Captain John Ellis, OBE, DFC & Bar.
- Group Captain Arthur Foden.
- Group Captain William Gwyn Morgan, OBE.
- Group Captain William Pitt-Brown, DFC, AFC.
- The Reverend Arthur John Potts, (Retd.)
- Group Officer Louise Hilliard Turner, OBE, Women's Royal Air Force.
- Group Captain Archie Little Winskill, DFC.
- Group Captain Brian Pashley Young, OBE.
- Air Commodore John Kevitt Rotherham, OBE; formerly on loan to the Government of Pakistan.

Civil Division

- Thomas Edward Allibone, Director, Research Laboratory, Associated Electrical Industries, Ltd., Aldermaston.
- Wilfred Arthur Bailey, Director of Safely Services, War Office.
- John Bartholomew, MC, JP, Chairman, John Bartholomew & Son, Ltd.
- Alderman William Harold Bellis, TD. For political and public services in Southport.
- Michael Pickersgill Benthall, Theatrical Producer.
- Jack Beresford. For services to Amateur Rowing.
- Lawrence Emlyn Douglas Bevan, Chairman, Board of Governors, St. Peter's, St. Paul's and St. Philip's Hospitals, London.
- George William Alfred Birkett, Superintendent of Production Pool, Admiralty.
- Ann Blumer, MBE, JP. For political and public services in Darlington.
- Colonel Geoffrey George Hargreaves Bolton, MBE, MC, DL, Chairman, North Western Division, National Coal Board.
- John Wilfred Bridgeman, Principal, Loughborough Training College.
- George Harold Brinkworth, Assistant Solicitor, Ministry of Pensions and National Insurance.
- David Brown, MB, ChB. For political and public services in Bootle.
- Leslie Farrer-Brown, Director, Nuffield Foundation.
- Herbert Alfred Butler. For political services in Doncaster.
- John Stanley Carter, OBE, Chief Alkali Inspector, Ministry of Housing and Local Government.
- Bernard John Collins, County Planning Officer, Middlesex.
- Frank Malcolm Collins, Senior Official Receiver, Board of Trade.
- James Oliver Cullimore, JP, Chairman, Monmouth County Agricultural Executive Committee.
- George Francis Darlow, OBE, Town Clerk and Clerk of the Peace, Reading.
- Gilbert Harold Samuel Edgar. For political and public services in Buckinghamshire.
- Benjamin Alfred Edwards, Chairman, University of London Joint Recruiting Board.
- William Malcolm Lingard Escombe, DSO. For political and public services in St. Albans.
- Walter Raphael Taylor Eveling, Assistant Chief Valuer, Board of Inland Revenue.
- Alderman Harold Ernest Fern, OBE, Honorary Secretary, Amateur Swimming Association.
- Lieutenant-Colonel Harold Arthur Golden, OBE, Chief Constable, Wiltshire Constabulary.
- Winifred Margaret Goode, Assistant Secretary, Home Office.
- James Graham, MB, ChB, Senior Administrative Medical Officer, North East Metropolitan Regional Hospital Board.
- Ian Dingwall Grant, MB, ChB, lately President, College of General Practitioners.
- Joan Agnes Gray. For political and public services in Kent and Sussex.
- Henry Rupert Green, Legal Senior Commissioner, Board of Control, Ministry of Health.
- Edmund Thomas Charles Grint, Chief Labour Officer, Imperial Chemical Industries, Ltd.
- Harman Joseph Gerrard Grisewood, Chief Assistant to the Director-General, British Broadcasting Corporation.
- Ludwig Guttmann, OBE, MD, MRCP, Director, National Spinal Injuries Centre, Stoke Mandeville Hospital, Aylesbury.
- Ivan Conrad Hill, Member, Monopolies Commission.
- Ernest John Hunter, JP, Chairman, Swan Hunter & Wigham Richardson, Ltd., Wallsend-on-Tyne.
- Henry William Walter Huxham, Assistant Solicitor, Ministry of Labour.
- Edward Richard Jackson, Chairman, Yorkshire (North Riding) Agricultural Executive Committee.
- Douglas John James, OBE, Representative of the London Region, on the National Savings Committee Chairman, Tottenham Savings Committee.
- Edgar Stafford Jones, MBE, Grade I Officer, Branch B, Foreign Office.
- Herbert Stanley Keep, MC, Assistant Chief Engineer, Ministry of Transport.
- Harold Thomas Kirby, Director of Army Contracts (Munitions), War Office.
- Janet Lacey. For services to refugees.
- Walter James Langford, JP, Headmaster, Battersea Grammar School, London.
- William Thomas Lewis, Regional Director, Bristol, Ministry of Works.
- Robert William Louis McCaig, JP, DL, Convener, Angus Council.
- John Crawford McKell, Joint Managing Director, Ralston & McKell, Ltd., Glasgow.
- Max Edgar Lucien Mallowan, Professor of Western Asiatic Archaeology, University of London. Director, British School of Archaeology in Iraq.
- Captain Arthur Marsden, Royal Navy, (Retd), Chairman, Committee of Management, The Shipwrecked Fishermen and Mariners' Royal Benevolent Society.
- Thomas Matheson, OBE, JP, Chairman, British Legion, Scotland.
- Frank Mayell, OBE, lately Superintendent, County Courts Branch, Lord Chancellor's Office.
- Violet Edith Seary-Mercer, OBE, Chairman, Central Clothing Depot Soldiers', Sailors' and Airmen's Families Association.
- Charles Thomas Meredith, Director of Contracts, General Post Office.
- Lieutenant-Colonel John Aylmer Christie-Miller, OBE, TD, Chairman, Stockport Local Employment and Disablement Advisory Committees.
- Anthony Horace Milward, OBE, Chief Executive, British European Airways Corporation.
- William Greenwood Mitchell, Director Mitchell Bros Sons & Co. Ltd.
- Captain George Horace Guy Morris, lately Commodore, RMS Queen Elizabeth, Cunard Steam-Ship Co. Ltd., Liverpool.
- Fred Pilling, Collector, London Port, Board of Customs and Excise.
- Ceri Giraldus Richards, Painter.
- Mary Olivia Robinson, OBE, Chief Nursing Officer, Department of Health for Scotland.
- Henry George Rushbury, CVO, RA, Artist Keeper of the Royal Academy.
- Martin Amsler Rushton, MD, FDS, RCS, Professor of Dental Medicine, University of London.
- James Douglas Russell. For political services in the Wirral.
- Henry Campbell Scarlett, JP. For political services in Dundee.
- Professor Alexander Whiteford Scott. For contributions to the food dehydration industry and services to the Aberdeen research establishment of the Ministry of Agriculture, Fisheries and Food.
- Cecil Blanche Woodham-Smith, Writer.
- Robert Allan Smith, Chief Scientific Officer, Royal Radar Establishment, Ministry of Aviation.
- Harold Spragg, Director, L. P. Watts & Co. Ltd.
- Reginald Statham, JP. For political and public services in Newcastle-under-Lyme.
- George Stephen, Lord Provost of Aberdeen.
- James Cecil Campbell Stewart, Deputy Managing Director, Production Group, United Kingdom Atomic Energy Authority.
- Richard George Meredith Street, Vice-Chairman, Central Transport Consultative Committee.
- Arthur Edward Swain. For services to agriculture in Northern Ireland.
- Alderman Grace Tebbutt, JP. For public services in Sheffield.
- Ernest Frederic Graham Thesiger, Actor.
- Peter Harold Llewellyn Thomas, lately Commissioner (Engineering Adviser), Civil Service Commission. Now Director of Ordnance (Filling), War Office.
- Ruth Tomlinson, MBE, United Kingdom Representative, United Nations Commission on the Status of Women.
- Francis Ralph Tubbs, Director, East Malling Research Station, Maidstone.
- Joan Wake, Honorary Secretary and General Editor, Northamptonshire Record Society.
- Norman Macdonald Lockhart Walker, Sheriff-Substitute of Lanarkshire at Glasgow.
- Alderman Harry Watson, JP. For political and public services in Wakefield.
- Harry Weber, Principal Executive Officer, Ministry of Education.
- Colonel John Milns West, TD, DL, Vice-Chairman, Combined Cadet Force Association.
- George Andrew Wheatley, Clerk of the Hampshire County Council and Clerk of the Peace.
- Errol Ivor White, Keeper of Palaeontology, British Museum (Natural History).
- Harold Newton White, lately Assistant Secretary, Ministry of Agriculture, Fisheries and Food.
- Henry Peart Wood, Principal, Jordanhill College of Education, Glasgow.
- John Clarke Ramsay Woodside, ERD, Deputy Director of Works, Air Ministry.
- Robert Lyon Wyllie, JP, DL, Chairman, West Cumberland Industrial Development Co. Ltd.
- William Young, Vice-Chairman, Scottish Milk Marketing Board.
- David Balfour, Her Majesty's Consul-General, Geneva.
- Francis William Alfred Fairfax-Cholmeley, British subject resident in France.
- Anthony Colin Kendall, OBE, lately Her Majesty's Consul-General, Mogadishu.
- Eric Freeman Madams, British subject, lately resident in Iraq.
- Herbert Francis Mooney, CIE, OBE, Forestry and Soil Conservation Adviser, Middle East Development Division, Lebanon.
- Lieutenant-Colonel Gerald John Pink, OBE, TD, lately Her Majesty's Consul, Harar.
- John Edgcumbe Rendle, Attaché, Her Majesty's Embassy, Washington.
- Henry Raywood Sawbridge, lately Her Majesty's Consul-General, Geneva.
- Raymond Horace Smith, British subject resident in Venezuela.
- James Hurtle Allen, Sheriff and Comptroller of Prisons, State of South Australia.
- Noel Stanley Bayliss, Professor of Chemistry at the University of the State of Western Australia.
- Lieutenant-Colonel Leopold Henry George Conville, OBE. For services to the United Kingdom community in West Pakistan.
- Johan Henrik Durr, Commissioner of Roads and Road Traffic, Southern Rhodesia.
- The Honourable Francis Joseph Finnan, formerly a Member of the Executive Council, State of New South Wales. For public services.
- Walter Sykes George, Architect, of New Delhi, India.
- The Reverend Mervyn Henderson, of Auchenflower, State of Queensland. For services to the Presbyterian Church and Education.
- Thomas Gilbert Henry Jones, Professor of Chemistry at the University of the State of Queensland.
- Harvey Theodore Blackburne Ryves, formerly Deputy Commissioner of Police, Federation of Malaya.
- Douglas Arthur Suthers, of Townsville, State of Queensland. For services to returned servicemen.
- Captain Hugh Arundell Were, a prominent Grazier, of Coleraine, State of Victoria.
- William Maurice Young, formerly Secretary to the Ministry of Labour and Social Welfare, Federation of Malaya.
- Edward Arrigo. For public services in Malta.
- John Harold Baldwin, OBE, Chief Accountant, East African Railways and Harbours.
- Ernest Bellevue, OBE, Head of Finance Department, Crown Agents for Oversea Governments and Administrations.
- Raymond Marie Antoine Berenger, Director of Public Works and Surveys, Mauritius.
- Myles Canice Madden King Carew, Director of Prisons, Federation of Nigeria.
- Lawrence John Clapham, MD, BS, Director of Medical Services, North Borneo.
- William Janvrin Deal, MVO, Director of Public Works and Commissioner of Lands, Aden.
- John Patrick Ilbert Fforde, Commissioner of Police, Northern Rhodesia.
- Archibald Peter Sturrock Forbes, Director of Agriculture, Tanganyika.
- Trevelyan Codrington Gardner, Secretary for Finance, Northern Rhodesia.
- The Right Reverend Percival William Gibson, Bishop of Jamaica.
- Alhaji Umaru Gwandu, MBE, Speaker, Northern House of Assembly, Northern Region, Nigeria.
- Haji Ibrahim bin Mohamed Jahfar, OBE, Mentri Besar of Brunei.
- Abraham Elias Issa. For public services in Jamaica.
- Richard Bradford McConnell, Director of Geological Surveys, British Guiana.
- Charles Petrie McConnachie. For public services in Sierra Leone.
- Kenneth Duncan Simpson MaCowan, Director of Veterinary Services, Kenya.
- James Eugene Pearman. For public services in Bermuda.
- William Edwin Rumbelow, MVO, Commissioner of Police, Federation of Nigeria.
- Alexander Frederick Morgan Smith, Director of Lands and Surveys, Uganda.
- Bahadurali Kassim Suleman Verjee. For public services in Uganda.
- Edgar Vernon Whitcombe. For public services in Kenya.
- Ronald Edward Wraith, OBE, Chairman, Federal Electoral Commission, Federation of Nigeria.

==== Officer of the Order of the British Empire (OBE) ====
Military Division

Royal Navy

- Commander Robert Henry Allen.
- Commander Eric Harry Banfield.
- Commander Sidney Noah William Dennis.
- Major (SD (B)) (Local Lieutenant-Colonel) Francis Vivian Dunn, CVO, Royal Marines.
- Acting Captain Emile William Goodman.
- Surgeon Commander Clifford Vivian Harries, MRCS, LRCP.
- Commander Brian Patrick McConnell.
- Surgeon Commander Robert Adams McKeown, MB, ChB, Royal Naval Reserve.
- Chief Engineer Officer John Benjamin Deane Payne, Royal Fleet Auxiliary Service.
- Commander Malcolm Harold James Petrie.
- Commander Richard Moncrieff Rome.
- Instructor Commander Samuel Sydney Stevenson.
- Commander David Franks Townsend, Royal Navy (Retd.)
- Commander John Strover Townson, DSC, Royal Navy (Retd.)
- Commander Richard Frederick Wells, DSC.

Army

- Lieutenant-Colonel Denis Arthur Beckett, DSO, (113508), The Parachute Regiment.
- The Reverend Charles John Henry William Andrew Bradley, MBE, Chaplain to the Forces, Second Class (301695), Royal Army Chaplains' Department.
- Lieutenant-Colonel Albert Eric George Brain, TD, (86368), The Wiltshire Regiment (Duke of Edinburgh's), Territorial Army (now T.A.R.O.).
- Lieutenant-Colonel (temporary) Douglas Richard Lucas Bright (77659), 1st Green Jackets, 43rd and 52nd.
- Lieutenant-Colonel (Quartermaster) Richard Thorpe Burkimsher, MBE, (178904), Royal Army Service Corps.
- Lieutenant-Colonel David Frank Turquand Colbeck (63671), The Royal Northumberland Fusiliers (Employed List 1).
- Lieutenant-Colonel (acting) James Edward Corless, TD, (32230), Combined Cadet Force (now retired).
- Lieutenant-Colonel (local Colonel) Stanley Edward Dickinson (161422), Royal Army Ordnance Corps.
- Lieutenant-Colonel Owen Frank Newton Dunn (52613), The Duke of Edinburgh's Royal Regiment (Berkshire and Wiltshire) (Employed List 1).
- Lieutenant-Colonel (now Colonel (temporary)) Michael Forrester, DSO, MC, (69349), The Parachute Regiment.
- Lieutenant-Colonel Kenneth Gardiner Galloway, BDS, (150137), Royal Army Dental Corps.
- Lieutenant-Colonel Andrew Aird George, MC, (117510), Royal Regiment of Artillery.
- Lieutenant-Colonel Nigel St. George Gribbon (71097), The King's Own Royal Border Regiment (Employed List 1).
- Lieutenant-Colonel David Llewelyn Griffith (74558), Corps of Royal Engineers.
- Lieutenant-Colonel (acting) Terence Leslie Higgins (231244), Army Cadet Force.
- Lieutenant-Colonel Michael Walter Holme, MBE, MC, (117134), 3rd East Anglian Regiment (16th/44th Foot).
- Lieutenant-Colonel David Ronald Kelly (151487), Royal Regiment of Artillery (now R.A.R.O.).
- Lieutenant-Colonel Charles Benson MacDonald, TD, (148236), Royal Regiment of Artillery, Territorial Army.
- Brevet and Temporary Lieutenant-Colonel Roy Stuart Marshall, MC, MM (224271), Royal Regiment of Artillery.
- Lieutenant-Colonel Herbert Gerard Thomas McClellan, TD, (189432), Royal Regiment of Artillery, Territorial Army.
- Lieutenant-Colonel William Wilson McHarg, MC, TD, (155625), Royal Regiment of Artillery, Territorial Army.
- Lieutenant-Colonel Allan Eric Eustace Mercer, MC, (94705), Royal Regiment of Artillery (Employed List 1).
- Major (Brevet Lieutenant-Colonel) Claud Macbeth Moir (105763), The Black Watch (Royal Highland Regiment).
- Lieutenant-Colonel Eric Charles William Mackenzie Penn, MC, (67902), Grenadier Guards (Employed List 1) (now R.A.R.O.).
- Lieutenant-Colonel Gordon Pollard, MC, MM, TD, (288876), The Parachute Regiment, Territorial Army.
- Lieutenant-Colonel (acting) William Harold Texereau Roberton, TD, (63734), Combined Cadet Force.
- Lieutenant-Colonel Norman Walter Routledge, TD, (58932), Royal Regiment of Artillery.
- Lieutenant-Colonel Walter Ernest Rowley (207812), Royal Army Service Corps (now R.A.R.O.).
- Lieutenant-Colonel (Staff Paymaster, First Class) Ronald Skeates (188926), Royal Army Pay Corps.
- Lieutenant-Colonel Kenneth Melbourne Squire, TD, (97979), Royal Regiment of Artillery, Territorial Army (now T.A.R.O.).
- Lieutenant-Colonel Harry Alexandria Styles (66118), The Green Howards (Alexandra, Princess of Wales's Own Yorkshire Regiment).
- Brevet and Temporary Lieutenant-Colonel David John Willison, MC, (95070), Corps of Royal Engineers.
- Lieutenant-Colonel Doris Helen Isabella Wilson (196476), Women's Royal Army Corps.
- Lieutenant-Colonel Gordon Henry Wotton (74574), Royal Corps of Signals.

Royal Air Force

- Wing Commander Roy Stanley Boast, DFC, (81066).
- Wing Commander Arthur Boonham (45533).
- Wing Commander Albert Holden Bullock (106111).
- Wing Commander Lawrence Barclay Davey (55088).
- Wing Commander Richard Duckett (73165).
- Wing Commander (Acting Group Captain) Charles Arthur Hague Goudie (77583).
- Wing Commander John Harris, DFC, (104460).
- The Reverend William Patrick Henry.
- Wing Commander John Erskine Malcolm, MB, ChB, (501602).
- Wing Commander Joseph Thaddeus O'Sullivan (48834), Royal Air Force Regiment.
- Wing Commander Frank Parvin (43140).
- Wing Commander Charles Harry Pocock (62782).
- Wing Commander Thomas Dixon Sanderson, AFC, (131619).
- Wing Commander Stanley Slater, DSO, DFC, (145503).
- Wing Commander Edwin Augustus Leon Wakely (31250).
- Wing Commander William Harry Webber (46182).
- Acting Wing Commander Charles Henry Markham (135352), Royal Air Force Volunteer Reserve (Training Branch).
- Squadron Leader George Stanislaus Lau (198801).

Civil Division

- John Adam, MB, ChB, Regional Medical Officer, Ministry of Health.
- Robert Anderson, Chief Executive Officer, Department of Agriculture for Scotland.
- William Reginald Andrew, Chief Constructor, Ship Department, Admiralty.
- Arthur Marshall Andrews, Administrative Officer, Television, British Broadcasting Corporation.
- Anthony Kemp-Bailey, Grade I Officer, Ministry of Labour.
- George Grenfell Baines, Architect Senior Partner, Grenfell Baines & Hargreaves.
- Ethel Margery Bartlett, Principal Educational Psychologist, Essex.
- Frank William Bates, Works Director, Kelvin & Hughes, Ltd., Barkingside, Essex.
- Frederick George Beith, Attached War Office.
- Alderman Alfred Jonathan Best, JP. For public services in Darlington and District, County Durham.
- Robert Taylor Bigland, Assistant County Commissioner for Handicapped Scouts, West Cheshire, Boy Scouts Association.
- Guy Stanley Maitland Birch, TD, Assistant Chief Solicitor, British Transport Commission.
- William John Black, JP, Chairman, Armagh County Committee of Agriculture.
- Geoffrey David Maurice Block. For political services.
- Kenneth William Bowder. For political and public services in Leicester.
- John Ernest Benjamin Bowdler. For political and public services in Shrewsbury.
- Ernest Bower, MBE, Chairman, Lincoln, Newark and District War Pensions Committee.
- Geoffrey Murray Boyd, Head, Technical Records Department, Lloyd's Register of Shipping.
- Nydia Minnie Brailey. For political services in Saffron Walden.
- Norbert Brainin, Violinist Leader of the Amadeus Quartet.
- Arnold Douglas Breguet, Accountant, Naval Accounts Branch, Navy, Army and Air Force Institutes.
- Harold Broadbent, Chairman, Bolton National Insurance Tribunal.
- Leonard Francis Broadway, Head of Research Laboratories, Electrical & Musical Industries, Ltd., Hayes, Middlesex.
- Alderman Mary Aymee Lilian Clifton-Brown. For political and public services in Norfolk.
- Oliver Gustave Frank Brown, Joint Managing Director, The Leicester Galleries.
- William Martin Brownlie, Rector, Greenock High School, Renfrewshire.
- John Brymer, Clarinetist.
- George Henry Burgess, Chairman, Lerwick Harbour Trust.
- Alderman William Burrows, JP, Chairman, St. Helens Local Employment Committee.
- Albert Daniel Leo Carroll, Captain Staff Pilot, Grade I, Civil Aviation Flying Unit, Stansted, Ministry of Aviation.
- Robert James Clayton, Manager, Applied Electronic Laboratories, General Electric Co. Ltd.
- James Arthur Cole, MBE, Commander, Metropolitan Police Force.
- Major Ronald Edmond Combe, MC, Chairman, Herefordshire Civil Defence Committee.
- Charles Alan Connell, Conservator, Forestry Commission.
- Giles Stannus Cooper, Playwright.
- Alderman Frederick James Cornthwaite. For public services in the West Riding of Yorkshire.
- Richard Desmond Cramsie, County Inspector, Royal Ulster Constabulary.
- Alexander Lamb Cullen, Professor of Electrical Engineering, University of Sheffield.
- Claude Culpin, Chief Machinery Advisory Officer, National Agricultural Advisory Service, Ministry of Agriculture, Fisheries and Food.
- Lieutenant-Colonel Guy Frederick Dale, DL, lately Chairman, County of Cambridge and Isle of Ely Territorial and Auxiliary Forces Association.
- Frank Herbert Davey, Accountant-General, Commonwealth Relations Office.
- Norman Davey, Senior Principal Scientific Officer, Building Research Station, Department of Scientific and Industrial Research.
- Alexander Robert Dean, District Auditor, Ministry of Housing and Local Government.
- Norman Holdsworth Dean, General Manager, Yorkshire Traction Co. Ltd.
- Frederick Henry Dight, lately Chief Meteorological Officer, Headquarters, Coastal Command, Air Ministry.
- Roger Nicholas Dixey, Director, Institute of Agrarian Affairs, University of Oxford.
- John Dixon, LRCP, LRCS, Chairman, St. Albans Medical Board.
- Tom Eatough, Chairman and Managing Director, Eatough's, Ltd., Earl Shilton, Leicester.
- Charles Clark Elder, Senior Inspector of Taxes, Board of Inland Revenue.
- George Branwhite Ellis, Higher Collector, Birmingham, Board of Customs and Excise.
- Betty Agnes Fripp, International Commissioner, Commonwealth Headquarters, Girl Guides Association.
- Frank Edward Gaines, Engineer I, War Office.
- Mary Margaret Gallup, JP. For political and public services in Tavistock.
- Lieutenant-Commander Donald Herbert George. For political services in Canterbury.
- Herbert Whincup Gloyne, Chemist I, War Office.
- Mary Dilys Glynne, Principal Scientific Officer, Rothamsted Experimental Station, Harpenden, Hertfordshire.
- Geoffrey Desmond Gordon, Senior Medical Officer, Ministry of Pensions and National Insurance.
- Captain Gavin Charles Goudie, Master, SS Auckland Star, Blue Star Line, Ltd., London.
- Thomas Orrell Gray, Deputy Treasurer, Royal National Life-Boat Institution.
- Henry Leigh Groves, JP, Alderman, Westmorland County Council.
- Ellis Norman Gummer, Deputy Controller, Arts and Science Division, British Council.
- Stanley Gunson, Superintendent, Mechanical Engineering, Atomic Weapons Research Establishment, Aldermaston, United Kingdom Atomic Energy Authority.
- Alexander Edwin Halliday, General Secretary, Amalgamated Union of Operative Bakers, Confectioners and Allied Workers of Great Britain and Ireland.
- Eric Lawrence Hancock, Deputy Representative of the British Council, Pakistan.
- Reginald Llewellyn Hancock, President, Trawler Owners' Association, Milford Haven.
- Ernest Henry Harman, Deputy Chairman, East Midlands Gas Board.
- Major George Bourke Harvey, lately Governor, Class I, HM Prison, Wakefield.
- George Montague Harvey, Managing Director, British Oxygen Wimpey, Ltd.
- William James George Hawkins, Principal Sea Transport Surveyor, Ministry of Transport.
- Dorothy Veale Haythornthwaite. For political services in North Fylde.
- Eric Frank Hedger, Assistant Director of Navy Contracts, Admiralty.
- William Stewart Henderson, Secretary, Antrim County Council.
- Alma Gertrude Hiett. For political and public services in Cumberland.
- Joseph Stanley Hill, Principal, Board of Customs and Excise.
- Alderman Edwin Rigby Hinchliffe, Chairman, Ashlar Divisional Executive, Local Education Authority, West Riding of Yorkshire.
- Eileen Mary Hoare. For political and public services in London.
- Eric Percival Hodgson, JP, lately General Secretary, Association for Post Office Controlling Officers.
- Robert William Baxter Howarth, Chief Information Officer, Grade B, Ministry of Works.
- Arthur Edward Howells, Chief Executive Officer, Ministry of Pensions and National Insurance.
- Gerald Edward Howling, lately Principal of Mineral Resources Division, Overseas Geological Survey, Colonial Office.
- Derek Walter Lionel Hughes, Staff Controller, Scotland, General Post Office.
- Lieutenant-Colonel Thomas Wynne Lloyd Hughes, DL. For political and public services in North Wales.
- William John Irwin, JP. For political services in Belfast.
- Fred Jackson, Regional Controller, London (South), National Assistance Board.
- George James Morley Jacob, JP, Secretary, London Police Court Mission.
- Alderman Arthur Reginald Jones, JP, Chairman, Montgomeryshire County Council.
- Kenneth Jeffrey Jones. For services to Welsh Rugby Football.
- Thomas Hugh Jones, Senior Honorary Veterinary Officer, Royal Welsh Agricultural Society.
- James Knipe, Principal Officer, Ministry of Health and Local Government, Northern Ireland.
- Marjorie Cecile Laidman, Headmistress, Cowplain Secondary School for Girls, Waterlooville, Hampshire.
- Harry Lamb, Principal, Bilston College of Further Education, Staffordshire.
- Willie John Layton, Chairman, Herefordshire Agricultural Executive Committee.
- Richard Macgregor Lemmon, Secretary, Royal Highland and Agricultural Society of Scotland.
- Wilfred Roy Lewin, Principal, Admiralty.
- Charles Gordon Libby, Superintending Estate Surveyor, Ministry of Works.
- Captain Arthur George Litherland, lately Commodore, Pacific Steam Navigation Co. Ltd., Liverpool.
- Martin Lovett, Chief Inspector for River Pollution, Yorkshire Ouse River Board.
- John Cunningham MacCallum, Director of Research, Lace Research Association.
- Angus Roy Jenner McGregor, Project Manager, Lobatsi Abattoir, Bechuanaland.
- Donald McKenzie, Principal Scientific Officer, Armament Research and Development Establishment, War Office.
- Frederick Walter Maclachlan. For political and public services in Fife.
- Alexander McLean, Principal Inspector of Taxes, Board of Inland Revenue.
- Muriel Annette, The Honourable Mrs Maclean of Ardgour, President, Argyll Branch, British Red Cross Society.
- Francis Leslie Marwood, Superintending Naval Store Officer (Higher Scale), Portsmouth, Admiralty.
- Alick Ernest Mason, lately Managing Director, BP Refinery (Kwinana), Ltd., and Director, BP Australian, Ltd.
- Belinda Davie Mason, Matron, Lennox Castle Hospital, Lennoxtown.
- Leslie Frank Masters, Superintending Civil Engineer, Grade I, No. 7 Works Area, Air Ministry.
- Francis Mees, BEM, Chief Officer, Berkshire and Reading Fire Brigade.
- James Henry Herbert Merriman, Assistant Staff Engineer, General Post Office, on loan to HM Treasury.
- Sidney Charles Merson, Chief Executive Officer, Public Works Loan Board.
- Mary Emma, Lady Meyrick. For public services in Pembrokeshire.
- John James Gordon Michie, Head of Commercial Division, John Laing & Son, Ltd.
- Herbert Sidney Mileman, Assistant Comptroller, National Debt Office.
- Hugh Miller, Chairman, Board of Directors, Haven Products, Ltd., Hillington, Glasgow.
- William George Moffitt, Principal, Ministry of Transport.
- Thomas McCowat Montford, MB, ChB, Chairman, Leicestershire and Rutland Executive Council, National Health Service.
- Robert Maxwell Lyon Moore, JP. For political services in Londonderry.
- The Very Reverend Canon Peter Morrison, Chairman, Visiting Committee, Borstal Institution, Barlinnie.
- Jessie Elizabeth Morshead, Organiser and Secretary, Alexandra Rose Day Fund.
- John Smith Ramage Muir, Chief Constable, Ayr Burgh Police.
- Thomas Muirhead, Sheriff-Clerk of Aberdeenshire.
- Robert Naylor, MBE, Chairman, Darlington, Auckland and District War Pensions Committee.
- Robert Pearson Neilson, LDS, RCS(Ed), Chief Dental Officer, Midlothian and Peebles.
- Michael David Nightingale, Secretary, Museums Association.
- Charles Edwin North, Deputy Chairman, Northamptonshire Agricultural Executive Committee.
- Hugh William O'Connell, Principal Examiner, Patent Office, Board of Trade.
- John Weatherson Ormiston, JP, Secretary and Treasurer, Carnegie Dunfermline and Hero Fund Trusts.
- Miles Parkes, MB, ChB, Vice-Chairman, Cheshire Executive Council, National Health Service.
- Leonard Patrick, Head, Government Contracts Department, Imperial Chemical Industries, Ltd.
- Compton Edwin Pearson, Chief Inspector, Plant Health Inspectorate, Ministry of Agriture, Fisheries and Food.
- Abram Geoffrey Peel, JP. For political and public services in Bradford.
- Stanley William Petchey, MBE, Chairman, Chelmsford Savings Committee.
- William Melville Pooley, Managing Director, Towers & Co. Ltd., Meat Importers.
- Robert Gibson Prenter, Director, MacTaggart, Scott & Co. Ltd., Station Ironworks, Loanhead, Midlothian.
- Stanley Price, lately Grade 2 Officer, Ministry of Labour.
- Arthur Granville Ravensdale, MBE, Chairman, East Midland Regional Schools Advisory Committee.
- Henry Alexander Redpath, MBE, Senior Chief Executive Officer, Northern Regional Office, Board of Trade.
- Rowland George Richards, Grade 2 Officer, Ministry of Labour.
- Stanley Roland Richards, Assistant Accountant-General, Board of Customs and Excise.
- James Osbert Roach, Principal, Ministry of Education.
- Isabella Robertson, MBE, Grade I Officer, Ministry of Labour.
- Harold George Robert Robinson, Principal Scientific Officer, Ministry of Aviation.
- Hugh Rigby Rowbotham, MBE, Member, Midland Regional Board for Industry.
- Oscar William Rowntree, Divisional Land Commissioner, Yorkshire (North Riding), Ministry of Agriculture, Fisheries and Food.
- James Gordon Ruffell, Manager, Repair Department, John I. Thornycroft & Co. Ltd.
- John Albert Rugless, Principal, Ministry of Aviation.
- Herbert Francis Rutherford, lately Secretary, Board of Governors, Hospital for Sick Children, Great Ormond Street, London.
- George William Sale, lately Chairman, Birmingham Local Wheat Committee.
- Frank Henry Saniter, Director of Research, The United Steel Companies Ltd.
- Anne Shepherd, Adviser, Loan Section, Commonwealth Headquarters, Girl Guides Association.
- Hector Sayers Shuter, Manager in Brazil, Western Telegraph Co. Ltd.
- James Morrison Simpson. For political and public services in Banffshire.
- Lieutenant-Colonel James Beattie Skinner, TD, Wing Representative Chairman, Scottish Air Cadet Council.
- Albert Arthur Smales, Deputy Chief Scientist, Atomic Energy Research Establishment, Harwell.
- Nicholas Kay Smith, Technical Director, Murphy Chemical Co. Ltd.
- James Squire, Principal, Ministry of Pensions and National Insurance.
- Ena Mildred Steel, General Secretary, Church of England Moral Welfare Council.
- James Steptoe, MBE, Honorary Secretary, Sturminster Savings Committee.
- Sydney Frank Stevens, lately English by Radio Manager, British Broadcasting Corporation.
- Robert Horace Stroud, Chairman, Somerset County Council Children's Committee.
- Percival James William Summerfield, Senior Chief Executive Officer, Air Ministry.
- Victor Samuel Summerhayes, Principal Scientific Officer, Royal Botanic Gardens, Kew.
- Frederick John Dunn Taylor, MBE, Staff Engineer, Research Station, General Post Office.
- Godfrey Theaker, Secretary, John I. Jacobs & Co. Ltd., Shipowners, London. For services to trade in the Island of St. Helena.
- Ferdinand Bernard Thole, lately Senior Principal Scientific Officer, Ministry of Power.
- John Hugh Thomas, Chairman, Anglesey County Council.
- Ernest Frederick Thompson, Director and General Manager, British Small Arms Guns, Ltd.
- Leon Thompson, MBE, Senior Chief Executive Officer, Foreign Office.
- Ernest Arthur Timson, MBE, Managing Director, Timsons, Ltd., Kettering, Northamptonshire.
- William Gordon Tong. For political and public services in Buckinghamshire.
- Walter John Triggs, Senior Maintenance Surveyor, Receiver's Office, Metropolitan Police Force.
- Alec Tunnington, JP, Honorary Assistant Treasurer, Liverpool Savings Committee.
- James Pellatt Turner, Director of Printing Works Division, HM Stationery Office.
- Thomas Walker. For services to Scottish Association Football.
- Cecil Richard Hutton Ward, Deputy Director, Exhibitions Division, Central Office of Information.
- Kathleen Mary Ward, Deputy President, Sussex Branch, British Red Cross Society.
- Edith Annie Watson, JP, Chairman, Burnley and District Hospital Management Committee.
- Johann Leopold Welser, Grade 7 Officer, Branch A, Foreign Office.
- Geoffrey Henllan White, Editor, The Complete Peerage.
- Stanley Charles White, MBE, Secretary, Citizenship Training Committee, Army Cadet Force.
- Melissa Sillence Whitley, Chief Examiner, Board of Inland Revenue.
- Captain James Percival Raymond Williams, Commodore Chief Engineer, MV Rangitiki, New Zealand Shipping Co. Ltd., London.
- William Pierce Williams, MM, Principal Collector of Taxes, Board of Inland Revenue.
- Harry McIntyre Wilson, MRCVS, Veterinary Practitioner, Fife.
- Frank Wood, Telephone Manager, Leeds.
- Mary Louisa Cooper Woodham, MBE, Grade 2 Officer, Branch B, Foreign Office.
- John Alwyn Cayton, British Council Representative, Brazil.
- Halsey Sparrowe Colchester, British Consul, Zurich.
- John Frederick Greaves, President, British Chamber of Commerce, Belgium.
- Hubert Deacon Harrison, Chief Correspondent in Austria of Reuters Ltd.
- Robert Fritz Herries Hinrichsen, FRCS(Ed), Medical Director, Strangers' Hospital, Rio de Janeiro.
- Richard Paul Hogge, British subject resident in Chile.
- Harold Reginald Lord, British subject resident in Beira.
- William Mackenzie, British subject resident in Spain.
- William Henry Marsh, Labour Attaché, Her Majesty's Embassy, Brussels.
- Major Michael William Stilwell, MC, British subject resident in Portugal.
- The Reverend Robert Veysey de Carle Thompson, Baptist Missionary, Belgian Congo.
- William Lionel Carlyon Tweedy, British subject resident in Peru.
- John Baxter Ventham, British subject lately resident in Iran.
- George Malcolm Wilson, lately Manager, Antofagasta-Bolivia Railway, La Paz.
- William James Wilson, MBE, British subject resident in France.
- Ernest Frank Wise, Her Majesty's Consul, Los Angeles.
- James Anthony Allison, First Assistant Secretary (Finance), Bechuanaland Protectorate.
- Honoria Christina Atherton, State President, Queensland Country Women's Association.
- Gilbert Rowatt Gordon Cameron, Under Secretary and Permanent Head of the Department of Public Health, State of New South Wales.
- Henry James Reginald Cole, Town Clerk, City of Hobart, State of Tasmania.
- Margaret Estelle Cunningham, Principal of Fintona Girls' School, State of Victoria.
- Vernon Ernest Dawson, formerly Senior Assistant Commissioner of Police, Federation of Malaya.
- Harry Fell, formerly Chief Statistician, Federation of Malaya.
- Cyril Fortune, MD, FRACP. For services to the Blood Transfusion Service in the State of Western Australia.
- Edward Rowland Gee, formerly Director of Geological Survey of Pakistan.
- Reginald Richard Gregory, Town Clerk, Gwelo, Southern Rhodesia.
- Edric Georg Hallam, an Assessor on the Water Court, Southern Rhodesia.
- Mervyn Holland, formerly President of the Local Government Association, State of South Australia.
- Donaldson Gray Hood, formerly Divisional Road Engineer, Umtali, Southern Rhodesia.
- Trevor Claude James, MB, BS, Commissioner of the St. John Ambulance Brigade in the State of Tasmania.
- Reginald Kelly, an Attorney in Mafeking; Legal Adviser to the Bechuanaland Protectorate Administration.
- Richard William Kelly, Deputy Controller, Trade Division (Supplies), Ministry of Commerce and Industry, Federation of Malaya.
- Rasebolai Kgamane, MBE, BEM, African Authority, Bamangwato Tribe, Bechuanaland Protectorate.
- Winifred Barbara Meredith, MB, BS, Director of Maternal, Infant and Pre-school Welfare, Department of Health, State of Victoria.
- Audrey Cummins Morphett. For social welfare services in the State of South Australia.
- David Low Penny. For services to the United Kingdom community in Pakistan.
- John Reginald Robertson. For services to Tennis in the State of Victoria.
- James Ross. For services to charitable movements in the State of Victoria.
- George White Rothery, MC, Acting Comptroller of Supplies, Treasury, Federation of Malaya.
- David Leslie Vivian Rowe. For services to the United Kingdom community in India.
- John Houghton Sumner, Chief Hydro Development Engineer, Central Electricity Board, Federation of Malaya.
- Margaret Alison Telfer, Registrar, University of Sydney, State of New South Wales.
- Alfred Harold Varcoe. For services to industry and the community in the State of New South Wales.
- Arthur Ridley Williams, formerly Commissioner of Main Roads, State of Queensland.
- Charles Emanuel Williams, MD, a medical practitioner, of Mackay, State of Queensland.
- Sesca Ross Zelling, President of the Branch in the State of South Australia of the National Council of Women.
- Reginald Banham Allen. For services to sport in Nigeria.
- Theophilus Sunday Babatunde Aribisala, Principal Agricultural Officer, Western Region, Nigeria.
- Oliver Penlyn Bennett. For services to sport in Trinidad.
- Victor Gordon Bennett, Deputy Regional Director, Uganda, East African Posts and Telecommunications Administration.
- The Reverend Canon Philip Bottomley, Headmaster, Nabumali High School, Uganda.
- Harold Albert Braham, JP, General Manager, Jamaica Industrial Development Corporation.
- Edith Clarke. For public services in Jamaica.
- Reginald Arnold Clarke, DFC, Undersecretary (Finance), Federation of Nigeria.
- Clifford Alfred George Coleridge, Director of Audit, Aden and Somaliland.
- John Reginald Crabbe, Senior Education Officer, Tanganyika.
- Charles Ruickbie Davidson, Planning and Development Adviser to the City Council of Nairobi, Kenya.
- Ernest Howard Davis, Chief Assistant Secretary, Gibraltar.
- Wladyslaw Dering, Senior Medical Officer (Surgical) Somaliland Protectorate.
- Clement Joseph Leonard Dupigny. For public services in Dominica.
- Harry Evans. For services to tropical agriculture and to the sugar and cocoa industries in British Guiana.
- Richard James Farrell, Senior Engineer, Crown Agents for Oversea Governments and Administrations.
- Charles Joseph Fenton, MBE, Director of Posts and Telegraphs, North Borneo.
- Philip Fletcher, Headmaster, Prince of Wales School, Nairobi, Kenya.
- Hubert Philip Peter Gale, Acting Principal, Royal Technical College, Nairobi, Kenya.
- John William Laurence Gale, Representative, British Council, British Guiana.
- Ratu Penaia Kanatabatu Ganilau, DSO, Economic Development Officer, Fiji.
- James Olva Georges, MBE. For public services in the British Virgin Islands.
- The Reverend Walter Henry Graddon. For services to education in the Eastern Region, Nigeria.
- Arthur Leslie Hardy, BEM. For public services in the Falkland Islands.
- Stephen John Henry, Electoral Commissioner and Chief Federal Officer West, Western Region, Nigeria.
- Lawrence John Hobson, lately Assistant Chief Secretary, Aden.
- Leonard Catesby Huggins, MB, ChB, Medical Officer and Bacteriologist (Senior Surgeon), Bahamas.
- John Michael Hunter. For public services in Tanganyika.
- Joseph Enaifoghe Imoukhuede, Administrative Officer, Class I, Principal Assistant Secretary, Premier's Office, Western Region, Nigeria.
- Alison Hingley Izzett, Chief Social Welfare Officer, Federation of Nigeria.
- John Howard Jameson. For public services in St. Helena.
- Arthur Richard Kemp. For public services in Northern Rhodesia.
- Edward Douglas Kirby. For services to farming in Northern Rhodesia.
- Gwilym lorweth Michael, Director of Education, Seychelles.
- Justin Trevor Moon, Deputy Director of Agriculture, Uganda.
- David Joseph Mead Muffett, Senior District Officer, Northern Region, Nigeria.
- Zacheus Chukwu Obi. For public services in the Eastern Region, Nigeria.
- Alice Mabysse Paterson, Principal of Women's Training College, Kano, Northern Region, Nigeria.
- Arthur Edward Perry, ED, Controller of Stores, Hong Kong.
- William Pulfrey, Commissioner (Mines & Geology), Kenya.
- Thomas Reginald Colston Raikes, Postmaster-General, Sierra Leone.
- Frank Walton Roe, formerly Director of Geological Surveys, Sarawak, now Deputy Director, Overseas Geological Surveys.
- The Reverend Edward Charles Rusted. For public services in North Borneo.
- The Reverend Joseph Ernest Sandbach. For public services in Hong Kong.
- Alexander Daniel Jamieson Scott, TD, Permanent Secretary, Ministry of Education and Welfare, Sierra Leone.
- Agnes Ramsay Shaw. For public services in Kenya.
- Ian Small, Director, West African Building Research Institute.
- David Wilson Spreull, Government Town Planner, Jamaica.
- Reginald Henry Lothian Sung. For public services in Brunei.
- Eugene Julian Theunissen, Administrative Officer, Nyasaland.
- Ting Lik Hung. For public services in Sarawak.
- Mallam Mohammadu Tukur, Emir of Yauri, Northern Region, Nigeria.
- Selwyn John Walton, Chief Accountant, Treasury, Aden.
- John Macdonald Wann, District Commissioner, Sierra Leone.
- Everton De Courcey Weekes, Cricket Coach to Barbados Government.
- Dudley Lee Borrett Wickham, Commissioner of Local Government, British Guiana.
- Joseph William Widdell, Administrative Officer, Class I, Secretary to the Governor, Eastern Region, Nigeria.
- Harry Norman Williamson, Senior Principal (Education Department), Hong Kong.
- William George Wilson, Financial Secretary, Mauritius.
- Peter William Youens, Deputy Chief Secretary, Nyasaland.

==== Member of the Order of the British Empire (MBE) ====
Military Division

Royal Navy

- Lieutenant-Commander Malcolm James Hopewell Bonner, DSC.
- Temporary Electrical Lieutenant Albert George Butler, (Retd.)
- Lieutenant-Commander Frederick Charles Brandling Copland-Griffiths.
- Engineer Lieutenant-Commander James Edward Percival Cuff.
- Lieutenant-Commander Harold Thomas Duffy, Royal Naval Reserve.
- Supply Lieutenant John William Evans, (Retd.)
- Lieutenant-Commander (SD) Jack Alfred James Johnson.
- Lieutenant-Commander Charles Victor Jones.
- Lieutenant-Commander Denys Cooper Landman, Royal Malayan Navy.
- Surgeon Lieutenant-Commander Donald Campbell McNutt, MB, ChB.
- Lieutenant (SD) Donald McDowell Patchett, (Retd.)
- Recruiting Officer James Prentice.
- Lieutenant-Commander (SD) Charles Frederick Thorpe.
- Instructor Lieutenant-Commander Kenneth John Barnett Topley.

Army

- Captain Bridget Islay Forbes Adam (401904), Women's Royal Army Corps.
- Major John Forrester Allen (301412), Corps of Royal Engineers.
- Major (acting) Thomas Richard Ball (347276), Army Cadet Force.
- Major Michael Stewart Bayley (253885), Grenadier Guards.
- 4194526 Warrant Officer Class I Thomas Harold Owen Bound, The Royal Welch Fusiliers.
- Major (Staff Quartermaster) Sidney Ernest Bracken (171790), Employed List 2.
- Major (acting) Arthur Douglas Brown, TD, (193661), Combined Cadet Force.
- Captain (Quartermaster) Patrick Joseph Byrne, MM, (436106), The Parachute Regiment.
- Major George Tennant Calder (358631), Royal Pioneer Corps (Employed List 3).
- Major Henry Ernest Child (229665), Royal Regiment of Artillery.
- Major (Quartermaster) Edward Lovel Clapton (195753), Royal Army Service Corps.
- Major Edward William Chadnor Clutterbuck (354645), Royal Regiment of Artillery.
- 305120 Warrant Officer Class I George Colley, Royal Horse Guards (The Blues).
- Major (Quartermaster) George Robert Cooper (282295), Royal Tank Regiment, Royal Armoured Corps.
- Major (Quartermaster) Stanley Joseph Cottee (146235), 9th Queen's Royal Lancers, Royal Armoured Corps.
- 1927617 Warrant Officer Class II Abraham Crompton, The Duke of Lancaster's Own Yeomanry, Royal Armoured Corps, Territorial Army.
- Captain Keith Charles Davis (390362), Royal Army Service Corps.
- 22244832 Warrant Officer Class I (Bandmaster) Frederick William Dennett, The King's Shropshire Light Infantry, Territorial Army.
- Captain Jean Gordon Duff Donaldson (380492), Women's Royal Army Corps.
- 22225410 Warrant Officer Class I Charles Donnelly, Royal Army Ordnance Corps, Territorial Army.
- Major (Quartermaster) Leslie John Dyer (195434), Royal Regiment of Artillery (Employed List 2X) (now retired).
- Major (temporary) John Lindley Marmion Dymoke (364334), 2nd East Anglian Regiment (Duchess of Gloucester's Own Royal Lincolnshire and Northamptonshire).
- Captain Kathleen Nora Edwards, TD, (230037), Women's Royal Army Corps, Territorial Army.
- Major (Quartermaster) Ernest Albert Ellender (291234), Royal Army Service Corps.
- Major (acting) Leslie Harry Fallon (416731), Combined Cadet Force.
- Major George Tindal Fitchie (182127), Corps of Royal Engineers.
- Major (acting) Archibald Forbes, TD, (114573), Combined Cadet Force.
- Captain Frederick Sendall Furneaux, TD, (159801), Corps of Royal Engineers, Territorial Army.
- Major Ronald Richard Hugh Glue (288511), Corps of Royal Engineers.
- Major Thomas Harris (193240), Corps of Royal Engineers.
- Major (acting) Robin Antony Henderson, MC, TD, (140213), Combined Cadet Force.
- Major Charles Peter de Brisay Jenkins, MC, (276457), Corps of Royal Engineers.
- Captain William Kelly (379383), Corps of Royal Engineers.
- 21019298 Warrant Officer Class II Harry Kelsey, Corps of Royal Electrical and Mechanical Engineers, Territorial Army.
- Major (Quartermaster) Ralph Reginald Kimberley (408934), Army Catering Corps.
- Major John Lefroy Knyvett, MC, (94279), Royal Regiment of Artillery.
- 2209868 Warrant Officer Class II Albert Edward Lee, Royal Corps of Signals.
- 2718820 Warrant Officer Class I Desmond Thomas Lee Lynch, DCM, Irish Guards.
- Major Robert Lyon (288788), Royal Regiment of Artillery.
- Captain Laurence Geoffrey Walrond Marshall (277681), Royal Army Service Corps, Territorial Army.
- Major James McClure, TD, (67570), Royal Army Service Corps, Territorial Army (now T.A.R.O.).
- Major (acting) Alexander McDonald (283271), Army Cadet Force.
- Major Michael Bywater McNabb (117906), The Royal Scots (The Royal Regiment).
- 21192239 Warrant Officer Class II Donald McNair, Royal Regiment of Artillery, Territorial Army.
- Major Charles John Gerald Meade (190453), The Queen's Royal Irish Hussars, Royal Armoured Corps.
- 3596686 Warrant Officer Class I (Bandmaster) Ernest James Moore, The Lancashire Regiment (Prince of Wales's Volunteers).
- Major (Quartermaster) Thomas Gerard Nicoll (274365), Royal Regiment of Artillery.
- 22295950 Warrant Officer Class I Frederick James North, The Cameronians (Scottish Rifles), Territorial Army.
- Major (acting) Brian O'Kelly (256817), Combined Cadet Force (now retired).
- Major Benjamin James Palmer (85658), 3rd East Anglian Regiment (16th/44th Foot).
- 5444877 Warrant Officer Class I William John Passmore, The Somerset and Cornwall Light Infantry.
- 22200943 Warrant Officer Class II Robert Edward Paylor, Corps of Royal Engineers.
- 4381882 Warrant Officer Class II James Pearce, The Green Howards (Alexandra, Princess of Wales's Own Yorkshire Regiment), Territorial Army.
- S/4699887 Warrant Officer Class I Richard Sidney Athelstane Penfold, Royal Army Service Corps.
- W/276232 Warrant Officer Class II Agnes Pryer, Women's Royal Army Corps.
- Major Thomas Anthony Richardson (228462), Royal Regiment of Artillery.
- 894114 Warrant Officer Class II Ivor Rogers, MM, Royal Regiment of Artillery, Territorial Army.
- Major Maurice Carmel Sacco (325817) Royal Malta Artillery.
- 2925990 Warrant Officer Class II Peter Frederick Winton Scotland, Royal Pioneer Corps.
- Major Robert Edmond Scott, MC, (326145), The Durham Light Infantry.
- Major John James Seth (366390), Royal Army Ordnance Corps.
- Major Peter Charles Shapland (320366), Corps of Royal Engineers.
- 6344148 Warrant Officer Class II George Victor Isidore Simpson, The Queen's Own Royal West Kent Regiment.
- Major John Sydney Smith (132478), The Parachute Regiment, Territorial Army.
- Major Roy Albert Smith (112973), Royal Regiment of Artillery.
- 22802905 Warrant Officer Class I (Bandmaster) Victor Staddon, The Devonshire Regiment, Territorial Army.
- Major (temporary) Timothy Stuart Champion Streatfeild (369843), Royal Regiment of Artillery.
- 22517507 Warrant Officer Class II Richard Oswald Taylor, Honourable Artillery Company (Infantry), Territorial Army.
- 4529305 Warrant Officer Class I Richard Walter Trend, Corps of Royal Military Police, Territorial Army.
- 317727 Warrant Officer Class I Nicholas Jacobus Van Rensburg, 9th Queen's Royal Lancers, Royal Armoured Corps.
- Captain Taylor Walton (421467), Royal Regiment of Artillery.
- Captain (Quartermaster) Albert Ward, MM, (434965), The Royal Highland Fusiliers.
- Major Hugh Anthony Whitehead (64502), Royal Regiment of Artillery.
- S/68978 Warrant Officer Class I (acting) Walter James Dennis Wood, BEM, Royal Army Service Corps.
- Major Kenneth Leonard Coomber Wright (262701), Royal Army Service Corps, Territorial Army.
- Major Douglas Arthur Banks (375571), The Royal Sussex Regiment; on loan to the Government of the Federation of Malaya.
- Major Christopher Geoffrey Cotel Holmyard (75751), The King's Regiment (Manchester and Liverpool); on loan to the Government of the Federation of Malaya.
- Major Adrian Watson Wise, DSO, (85604), The Royal Warwickshire Regiment; on loan to the Government of the Federation of Malaya.
- WI/1027 Warrant Officer Class II Michael Rodolphus James, 1st Battalion, The West India Regiment.

Royal Air Force

- Squadron Leader George Ronald Bailey (55747).
- Squadron Leader Bartholomew Bainbridge, DFC, (179638).
- Squadron Leader John George Boagey (57858).
- Squadron Leader Charles Thomas Boxall, AFC, (44599).
- Squadron Leader Matthew Aitken Boyd (52597).
- Squadron Leader Edward Thomas Curran (2411677).
- Squadron Leader Stanley Herbert Kitchener Eyre, DFC, (54754).
- Squadron Leader Edward John Holden (500446).
- Squadron Leader Edwin Merch-Chammon (48375).
- Squadron Leader John Richardson (196473).
- Squadron Leader Ernest Henry Sowden (51777).
- Squadron Leader John Raymond Spencer (57501), Royal Air Force Regiment.
- Squadron Leader Alexander Haldane Stott (162273).
- Squadron Leader Frederick Thomas Trahair (56883).
- Squadron Leader Duncan Archie McFarlane Walker (53964).
- Squadron Leader Allan White (1608011).
- Acting Squadron Leader George Alexander Charles (153521).
- Acting Squadron Leader Job Greenwood Chew (57574).
- Acting Squadron Leader William Govanlock Hislop (168759), Royal Air Force Volunteer Reserve (Training Branch).
- Acting Squadron Leader Leonard Martin (67444), Royal Air Force Volunteer Reserve (Training Branch).
- Flight Lieutenant Edmund Ball (591619).
- Flight Lieutenant John Beattie (561447).
- Flight Lieutenant Robert Graham Carr (569186).
- Flight Lieutenant Benjamin Thomas Gunner (512033).
- Flight Lieutenant Samuel Myatt (130466).
- Flight Lieutenant Raymond Charles Phillips, BEM, (561871).
- Flight Lieutenant Donald Stanley Price (1573658).
- Flight Lieutenant John Alex Reed (52406).
- Flight Lieutenant Alfred Leslie Richards (522513).
- Flight Lieutenant Ronald George Sparkes, DFC, (154204).
- Flight Lieutenant Alan Tavenner (2692502), Royal Auxiliary Air Force.
- Flight Lieutenant Joseph Weedon (50170).
- Acting Flight Lieutenant John Bernard Bruce Watling (1336807).
- Flying Officer Leslie Samuel Davey (59147).
- Warrant Officer Ada Elsie Ainsworth (884772), Women's Royal Air Force.
- Warrant Officer Charles William Bowman, BEM, (512476).
- Warrant Officer Joseph Samuel Briggs (631797).
- Warrant Officer Philip Lincoln Burridge (901810).
- Warrant Officer John Henry Dale (517930).
- Warrant Officer Harold Ford (519078).
- Warrant Officer Robert James Greenway (591548).
- Warrant Officer Jack Gordon Harrison (552164).
- Warrant Officer Philip Charles Kiley (591340).
- Warrant Officer Leonard Pass (574029).
- Warrant Officer Frederick John Peyton (562590).
- Warrant Officer Frank Pratt (364940).
- Warrant Officer Hubert Markham Wenman (527490).
- Wing Commander William Henry Coast (49035); formerly on loan to the Government of Pakistan.

Civil Division

- Edwin John Abra, Divisional Officer, London Fire Brigade.
- Charles Henry Allen, Chief Chemist, Tate & Lyle, Ltd., Plaistow Refinery.
- Major Frederick Allsop, Honorary Secretary, Greenwich Savings Committee.
- Benjamin William Appleby, Music Organiser for Doncaster, and Schools Broadcaster.
- Enid Muriel Arnold, County Commissioner, Somerset, Girl Guides Association.
- James Bernard Arstall, formerly Higher Executive Officer, HM Dockyard, Hong Kong.
- Frank Henry Austen, General Manager, Rediffusion (South East), Ltd., Canterbury.
- Frederick Bacon, Chairman, Lambeth War Pensions Committee.
- Robert Bainbridge, JP, Chairman, South Shields, Jarrow and District War Pensions Committee.
- Stanley Henry Baker, JP, Chairman, Ulverston Rural District Savings Committee.
- William Dinsdale Banks. For political and public services in Deptford.
- John Calcluth Bannatyne, Chief Executive Officer, Department of Agriculture for Scotland.
- Georgiana Eleanor Barcroft, Clerical Officer, Foreign Office.
- Ernest Sidney Barnard, Higher Executive Officer, British Museum.
- Constance Lilian Barnes, Superintendent of Typists, Ministry of Transport.
- Frederick Barnes, Staff Officer, Board of Inland Revenue.
- Cecil Thomas Edwin Barnett, lately Experimental Officer, Royal Military College of Science, Shrivenham.
- George William Barrow, Senior Executive Officer, Ministry of Health.
- Cyril Jack Bawden, Headmaster, Ashburton County Primary School.
- Percival George Beak, Assistant Director, Commonwealth Forestry Bureaux, Oxford.
- Joseph Reginald Beaumont, lately Member, Huddersfield and Halifax District Advisory Committee, East and West Ridings of Yorkshire Regional Board for Industry.
- Graham Reginald Beeston, JP, Councillor, Bedwas and Machen Urban District Council.
- Frederick Southall Bell, Collector of Taxes, Board of Inland Revenue.
- William Victor Bell, lately Higher Clerical Officer, Ministry of Defence.
- Thomas John Bennett, Technical Class, Grade I, Royal Mint.
- Edgar Betts. For political services.
- William Kenneth Birchall, Estate Surveyor, Ministry of Works.
- Thomas Birtwistle, Chief Officer, Blackburn Fire Brigade.
- Alderman Henry Blackburn, Chairman, Fleetwood Sea Cadet Corps Unit, Lancashire.
- Marjorie May Boileau, Senior Executive Officer, Government Communications Headquarters.
- Colin Boorman, Research Manager, Capenhurst Works, Development and Engineering Group, United Kingdom Atomic Energy Authority.
- Donald Dalrymple Borland, formerly Certifying Officer, East Midland Traffic Area, Ministry of Transport.
- Joseph Harling Turner Borland, Chief Designer, Glenfield & Kennedy, Ltd., Kilmarnock, Ayrshire.
- Edward Henry Borrett, lately Higher Executive Officer, Ministry of Housing and Local Government.
- Dorothy Alice Boucher, District Nurse Midwife, Cradley, near Malvern.
- Albert Henry Bradley. For political and public services in Derbyshire.
- Harry Bridge, Senior Duly Authorised Officer, Mental Health Service, City of Liverpool.
- Cyril Alfred Brighton, Civil Defence Officer, Distillers Co. Ltd., Barry.
- Reginald Lewis Burrows, BEM, Foreman, Engineering Branch (Technical, Grade 1), Admiralty Gunnery Equipment Depot, Glasgow.
- Archibald Josiah Buxton, Senior Executive Officer, Ministry of Power.
- George Arthur Cain, Assistant Manager, C. & H. Crichton Ltd., Ship Repairers and Engineers, Liverpool.
- Hector Mackay Calder, DSO, MC, MD, ChB, lately Member, Glasgow National Service Medical Board.
- William Handley Calvert, Assistant Chief Constable, No. 2 Area, Air Ministry Constabulary.
- David Bisset Campbell. For services to youth in Grangemouth.
- Horace Charles Carter, Senior Executive Officer, Ministry of Agriculture, Fisheries and Food.
- Dudley Cemm, Engineer II, Aeronautical Inspection Directorate, Ministry of Aviation.
- Alderman Albert Edward Chappell, JP. For political and public services in Lincolnshire.
- Victoria Gertrude Chappelle, Senior Information Officer, Central Office of Information.
- Maud Helen Charlton. For political and public services in Surrey.
- Leonard Robert Charlwood, Clerk of Works (Class I), British Broadcasting Corporation.
- George William Frederick Claxton, Senior Experimental Officer, British Museum (Natural History).
- Eric George Clement, Divisional Officer, Kent Fire Brigade.
- Beatrice Mary Cliffe, County Borough Organiser, Huddersfield, Women's Voluntary Services.
- Samuel Cload, Principal Executive Officer, New Scotland Yard.
- Hilda May Coats. For political and public services in Argyll.
- Ethel Nellie Coe, Grade 5 Officer, Branch B, Foreign Office.
- David Newman James Cole, Chief Engineer Draughtsman, Vosper, Ltd., Portsmouth.
- Arthur Brierley Collins. For political and public services in Liverpool.
- Herbert Edward Collins, MM, Secretary, Aldershot District Athletic Association.
- John Colvin, Technical Class, Grade I, Royal Ordnance Factory, Bishopton, Renfrewshire.
- Henry Cooper, Chairman, Durham Rural District Savings Committee.
- Harold Edwin Crockford, Draughtsman, Grade I, Ministry of Agriculture, Fisheries and Food.
- William Joseph Crooks, Production Manager, Aberdare Cables, Ltd., South Wales.
- Alice Eva Cross, Ward Sister, Tone Vale Hospital, near Taunton, Somerset.
- James Cross, Member, Elham Rural District Council, Kent.
- Margery May Cullen. For services to the Leith Hill Musical Festival.
- John William Dane, Chief Clerk, District Probate Registry, Lincoln.
- Wilfred Ernest Davey, BEM, Superintendent, Admiralty Constabulary, Portsmouth.
- David Davidson, Head Postmaster, Motherwell and Wishaw, Lanarkshire.
- Elsie May Davis, Honorary Secretary, Clothing Depot, Poole Division, Soldiers', Sailors' and Airmen's Families Association.
- Ivor Leslie Davis, Head, Penge Evening Institute.
- James Henry Burnell Davis, Senior Executive Officer, Savings Department, General Post Office.
- Walter John George Davis, Grade 4 Officer, Ministry of Labour.
- Margaret Dawson. For political and public services in Middlesbrough.
- Harold Denman, Technical Representative, Moorwoods, Ltd., Harleston Iron Works, Sheffield.
- Frank Albert Dennis, Higher Executive Officer, Air Ministry.
- Mary Woodrow Dick, JP. For political and public services in Dunbartonshire.
- William Gerald Dickson, Wireless Communications Superintendent, Ministry of Home Affairs for Northern Ireland.
- William Edward Dornan, Honorary Secretary, Belfast Savings Council.
- George William Drew, lately Lettings Manager, Liverpool Corporation.
- Zoe Violet Drummond, County Organiser, Renfrewshire, Women's Voluntary Services.
- Fred Duerden, Chief Sales Superintendent, Telephone Manager's Office, Liverpool.
- Peter Leitch Duncan, JP, Chairman, Lower Banffshire Local Savings Committee.
- William Edward Duparcq, Higher Executive Officer, Admiralty.
- Arthur Robert Allen D'Ypres, Clerical Officer, Ministry of Education.
- Arthur Henry Richmond East, Clerical Officer, Export Credits Guarantee Department.
- Daphne Russell Edmunds, Assistant, Grade II, Office of the Prime Minister.
- Walter James Ellis, Chairman, Exeter, Barnstaple and District War Pensions Committee.
- David Evans, Secretary, Newcastle Emlyn Branch, Carmarthenshire, British Legion.
- George Baden Evans, Executive Officer, National Assistance Board.
- Elmore Carson Fallis, Honorary Secretary, Service Committee, Ballymena Branch, British Legion.
- Robert Patrick Farley, Engineer II, Inspectorate of Armaments, Ministry of Aviation.
- Frederick Robert Fisk, Senior Investigation Officer, Board of Customs and Excise.
- Edith Alice Christian-Fletcher, Old People's Welfare Specialist, Regional Staff, Women's Voluntary Services.
- Benjamin Jesse Folliard, Inspector of Accidents, British Overseas Airways Corporation.
- Samuel George Forsyth, Export Manager, Ford Motor Co. Ltd.
- Lily Kathleen Frith, Controller of Typists, Board of Trade.
- Richard Marchant Fry, lately Deputy Director, Colonies Department, British Council.
- William Strachan Gavin, MC. For services to the Boys Brigade in Leith.
- Eileen Marguerite Gerrard, formerly Restaurant and Welfare Superintendent, Navy, Army and Air Force Institutes, Cyprus.
- Stanley Arthur Gibbins, Senior Executive Officer, Colonial Office.
- Harold Gibson, Chief Preventive Officer, Board of Customs and Excise.
- Anne Melville Gilliland, County Librarian, Staffordshire.
- John Chester Gillott, lately Assistant Chief Commercial Officer, East Midlands Electricity Board.
- William Ernest Gilson. For services to inshore fishing, Southend-on-Sea.
- Arthur Edward Gisby. For political services in Nottingham.
- Leonard Godber, Local Director and General Manager, Newton Chambers & Co. Ltd., Sheffield.
- Thomas Henry Goodman, Honorary Secretary, Midland Rifle Association.
- Iris Evelyn Graves, Higher Executive Officer, Home Office.
- Kenneth Thomas James Green, Secretary, British Bacon Curers' Federation.
- Lily Elizabeth Green, JP. For political and public services in South Wales.
- William Green, Honorary Secretary, Bromyard and District Savings Committee.
- William Robert Groves, Superintendent, Short Brothers & Harland, Ltd., Belfast.
- William Redvers Guile, Attached War Office.
- Sidney Arthur Harold Guille, Senior Executive Officer, Office of the Paymaster-General.
- William Henry Thomas Hamer, Building and Civil Engineering Officer, South Western Region, Transport and General Workers' Union.
- Stanley Waynforth Hammond, Chairman, Eastbourne and District Disablement Advisory Committee.
- Robert Hargreaves, Chairman, Sheffield Amateur Sports Club, Abbeydale Park, Sheffield.
- Jack Harper, Chief Liaison Engineer, Admiralty Contracts, Heenan & Froude, Ltd., Worcester.
- Frederick Harrison, Member, Warwickshire Agricultural Executive Committee.
- John Harrison, Senior Executive Officer, Ministry of Pensions and National Insurance.
- Clementine Mary Hawthorn, Vice-President, Northumberland Branch, British Red Cross Society.
- Harry Robert Haynes, Senior Secretary and Principal Horticultural Officer, National Farmers' Union.
- Henry Heason, Higher Executive Officer, Air Ministry.
- William Benjamin Heigho, Executive Officer, Ministry of Transport.
- Max Edward Hellman, Clerk to HM Attorney-General.
- Ernest Frederick Hellmuth, lately Higher Executive Officer, Ministry of Pensions and National Insurance.
- Gerald Smedley Hervey, MC, Librarian, The Queen Alexandra Military Hospital, Millbank.
- John William Hickey, Works Manager, C. H. Bailey, Ltd., Ship Repairers, Barry Docks.
- Arthur Robert Hill, Higher Executive Officer, General Post Office.
- William Richard John Hoare, Senior Executive Officer, War Office.
- Joseph Pearson Leslie Hobbs, BEM, Member, National Savings Assembly, representing North Buckinghamshire.
- John Hodge, JP, Chairman, Ayr and Dumfries Collieries Savings League.
- Arthur Edward Holt, Claims Settler, War Risks Insurance Office, Ministry of Transport.
- Edith Frances Hopes. For political and public services in Bristol.
- Evelyn Mary Hopwood, Deputy Head and Senior Mistress, Greaves County Secondary School, Lancaster.
- Bertram Vivian Howell, Honorary Secretary, Pwllheli Station, Royal National Life-Boat Institution.
- Dudley Vincent Pelham Howell, Higher Executive Officer, Ministry of Pensions and National Insurance.
- George Wyllie Howie, Agricultural Organiser, Isle of Man.
- Herbert Edward Hudson, HM Inspector of Factories (Class 1A), Ministry of Labour.
- Roy Vivian Hughes, Assistant New Works Officer, Civil Engineer's Department, Manchester, British Railways.
- Joseph Lewis Humble, Chief Accountant, The Industrial Estates Management Corporation for Wales.
- Charles Henry Huntley, Clerk and Chief Financial Officer, Penrith Urban District Council, Cumberland.
- Elsie Dorothy Hurrell, lately Senior Nursing Sister, Union Castle Line, London.
- Margaret Flockhart Irvine, Higher Executive Officer, Scottish Education Department.
- Edward Jackson, lately Deputy Principal Officer, Ministry of Home Affairs, Northern Ireland.
- James Adam Jamieson, Headmaster, Coldstream Junior Secondary School, Berwickshire.
- Marjorie Jefferies, Executive Officer, Home Office.
- Mary Heddle Johnstone, formerly Secretary, Church of Scotland Committee for Hut and Canteen Work for HM Forces in Cyprus.
- The Reverend Haydn Price Jones, Officiating Chaplain, Royal Air Force, Wattisham.
- John Owen Jones, Head Postmaster, Aberystwyth, Cardiganshire.
- William Keane, Chief Scientific Officer, Headquarters Section, Derby Division, Civil Defence Corps.
- Alderman Thomas Vincent Keelan, Assistant Education Officer, Plastics Division, Imperial Chemical Industries, Ltd.
- Captain John Joseph Kelly, District Marine Manager, Fishguard Harbour, British Transport Commission.
- James Lackland Kennedy, Inspector of Taxes, Board of Inland Revenue.
- Ruby Elizabeth May Kenyon, Inspector of Taxes, Board of Inland Revenue.
- Hilda Mary Ker. For political and public services in Portsmouth.
- Mark Kielbig, lately Senior Executive Officer, Board of Trade.
- George Killen, Senior Technical Superintendent (Engineer), No. 22 Maintenance Unit, Royal Air Force, Silloth.
- John Paton King, Group Scoutmaster, 4th Ealing Group, Boy Scouts Association.
- Mabel Adelaide Hannah King, Domiciliary Midwife, Smethwick.
- John Edward Kneale, Chief Engineer, MV Dolius, Alfred Holt & Co. Liverpool.
- Frederick George Knight, Member, Newent Rural District Council.
- Ludwig Koch, Naturalist.
- Aurora Mary Lamplough, Senior Housing Manager, Crown Estate Commissioners.
- Captain Fred Laycock, Master, SS Empire Roach, Ministry of Transport.
- Margaret Frances Layne, Private Secretary to the Chairman, Gas Council.
- Walter Ernest Leach, Production Manager, Birds Eye Foods, Ltd., Lowestoft.
- Marjorie Leech. For political and public services in Warwickshire.
- Joan Davida Leggett, Administrative Assistant, Planning and Presentation, Sound Broadcasting, British Broadcasting Corporation.
- Harold Lennox, Senior Executive Officer, Board of Trade.
- John Hubert Lewis, Higher Executive Officer, Ministry of Pensions and National Insurance.
- Reginald Ernest Lewis, BEM, Works General Manager, Packaging and Distribution Divisions, Evans Medical Supplies, Ltd., Speke, Liverpool.
- Robert George Linale, Chairman, Shoreditch and Bethnal Green War Pensions Committee.
- Joseph Albert Lloyd, JP, lately Member, Denbigh Agricultural Executive Committee.
- Kenneth Grenville Lloyd, Chief Export Estimator, John Thompson Water Tube Boilers Ltd.
- Gerard Masterman Loly, Lecturer, Royal Military Academy, Sandhurst.
- George Lomas, Assistant Mechanical Engineering Officer, Command Workshop, Royal Electrical and Mechanical Engineers, Ashford, War Office.
- Ernest George Longman, Executive Director, The Hoffman Manufacturing Co. Chelmsford.
- Thomas Peter McDermott, Engineer II, Royal Ordnance Factory, Woolwich.
- Blanche Adelaide McDonald, Regional Organiser, (South Wales Region, National Union of Tailors and Garment Workers.
- Captain John Macdougall, Section Minewatching Service Officer, Royal Naval Minewatching Service, Nore Command.
- Ronald McGlashen, Assistant Commercial Officer (Industrial Engineer), South of Scotland Electricity Board.
- James Petrie McIntyre, BEM, Divisional Officer (Grade I), Glasgow Fire Brigade.
- Annie Mackenzie, Executive Officer, State Management Districts (Scotland).
- Kenneth Mackinnon, Deputy Chief Constable, Argyll County Police.
- Margaret Edith Mackway, Clerical Officer, Commonwealth Relations Office.
- Margaret Ferrier McRitchie, lately Grade 5 Officer, Branch B, Foreign Office.
- Dominick McSweeney, Technical Class, Grade A, HM Dockyard, Portsmouth.
- William George Madge, Senior Accountant (Professional), Ministry of Agriculture, Fisheries and Food.
- Kathleen Veronica McDougall Maiden. For political and public services in the East Midlands.
- Henriette Stacey Marchant, Chairman, Tonb ridge Urban District Street Savings Committee.
- Thomas Joseph Marjoram, Higher Executive Officer, Ministry of Agriculture, Fisheries and Food.
- Gladys Amy Martin, Clerical Officer, Board of Trade.
- Vera Dorothy Mason, Welfare Officer, Ministry of Health, seconded to the Ministry of Housing and Local Government.
- John Alexander Matthew, lately Head of Spinning Department, Linen Industry Research Association, Northern Ireland.
- Eleanora Maunder, Matron, Old People's Home, Wincanton, Somerset.
- Jessamine Iris Medcalf, Higher Executive Officer, Ministry of Transport.
- Felice Ambrose Mercieca, lately Honorary Secretary, Malta League.
- Winifred Norman Metcalfe. For political and public services in Kent and Norfolk.
- George Frederick Midwood, lately Engineer II, Royal Aircraft Establishment, Ministry of Aviation.
- William Crawford Miller, Chairman, Paisley and District Disablement Advisory Committee.
- Herbert James Mills, Senior Superintendent, Mercantile Marine Office, Newcastle, Ministry of Transport.
- Ernest Soutar Milne, Senior Public Health Engineering Assistant, Ministry of Works.
- Mary Iola Misa. For public services in Minehead, Somerset.
- Arthur Lewis Mitchell, Agricultural Journalist.
- Leslie Edgar Morgan, Horticulturist, Highways Engineering Staff, Ministry of Transport.
- Olwen Eirene Morgan, JP, National President, Women's Section, Free Church Federal Council (England & Wales).
- George Alfred Morris, Higher Executive Officer, Ministry of Aviation.
- Robert Bruce Morrison, lately Higher Executive Officer, Fisheries Laboratory, Lowestoft, Ministry of Agriculture, Fisheries and Food.
- James William Moseley. For political services.
- Doris Irene Moss, Regional Organiser, London Region, Women's Voluntary Services.
- John Myerscough, Chairman, Bacup Local Employment Committee, Lancashire.
- Samuel Thomas Nash, Chairman, Public Health and Waterworks Committee, Ashbourne Rural District Council.
- Dennis Ambrose Neill, Director, Smart & Brown (Engineers), Ltd.
- Arthur Sidford Newman, Grade 4 Officer, Ministry of Labour.
- Sarah Elizabeth Newman. For political and public services in Morecambe and Lonsdale.
- Walter Rufus Newton, Superintendent and Deputy Chief Constable, Newport Borough Police.
- Alexander Neil Nicolson, Secretary and Treasurer, Gaelic Society of Inverness.
- Samuel Alfred George Nowell, Establishment Inspector, County Courts Branch, Lord Chancellor's Office.
- Nellie Nuttall. For political and public services in the West Riding of Yorkshire.
- Kevin Patrick O'Neill, Secretary, National Dairymen's Association.
- Dorothy Maude Oultram, formerly Assistant Director, Soldiers', Sailors' and Airmen's Families Association, Malaya.
- Major James Glover Parker, lately Chief Clerk, Territorial and Auxiliary Forces Association, County of Stafford.
- Leslie Middleton Parker, Chief Engineer, Northern General Transport Co. Ltd.
- William Mathie Parker. For services to the study of the works of Sir Walter Scott.
- Jane Cynthia Cicely Parsons, Clerical Officer Secretary, Office of the Prime Minister.
- Margaret Russell Paton, Superintendent, St. Faith's Shelter, Coventry.
- Mary Ann Paton, Chief Clerk and Supervising Secretary, Territorial and Auxiliary Forces Association, County of Oxford.
- Edna Mary Pearce, Honorary Secretary, Nottingham City Savings Committee.
- Walter Kennedy Pearce, TD, Chairman, Southampton National Assistance Appeal Tribunal.
- Edmund Pedlar, Chief Clerk, Board of Customs and Excise.
- David Croll Pendrigh, Inspector of Taxes, Board of Inland Revenue.
- Frank John Perkins, Higher Executive Officer, Ministry of Power.
- John Telford Petrie, Chief Civil Defence Officer, Unilever Group of Companies.
- Margaret Lucy Pile. For political and public services in Montgomeryshire.
- Eirene Elizabeth Pilkington, Deputy Director, Hampshire Branch, British Red Cross Society.
- Charles Henry Pope, Radio Supervisor, War Office.
- Joan Mary Porter, Clerical Officer Secretary, Cabinet Office.
- Thomas Cyril Powell, Headmaster, Gig Mill County Primary Junior School, Stourbridge, Worcestershire.
- John Alexander Price, Chief Draughtsman, Ship Department, Admiralty.
- Leslie Harold Priestley, lately Superintending Engineer and Bridge Master of Tower Bridge.
- Robert George Protheroe, Manager, Purfleet Terminal, Esso Petroleum Co. Ltd.
- John Henry Archibald Pugh, Assistant Engineer, London Telecommunications Region, General Post Office.
- Herbert Radford, Dock Master, Cammell Laird & Company (Shipbuilders & Engineers), Ltd., Birkenhead.
- Elizabeth Rashleigh, JP, Chairman, Women's Section, Southern Area, British Legion.
- Edith Barbara Readymartcher, BEM, County Organiser, Lincolnshire, Lindsey, Women's Voluntary Services.
- Francis Corbett Reid, Regional Fatstock Officer, Ministry of Agriculture, Fisheries and Food.
- Nellie Bella Reid, Superintendent Radiographer, Radiotherapy Department, Royal Marsden Hospital, London.
- Rosalie Sperling Richardson, County Organiser, Dorset, Women's Voluntary Services.
- William Threlfall Rimmer, Chairman of Committee, No. 273 (Wallasey) Squadron, Air Training Corps.
- Mary Brown Clelland Ritchie, Ward Sister, Bangour Village Hospital, West Lothian.
- Observer Commander Harold Robens, Deputy Area Commandant, Western Area Headquarters, Royal Observer Corps.
- Herbert Ellis Hugheston-Roberts. For political services in Wales.
- Rachel Annie Roberts, Member, Cwmamman Urban District Council.
- Nan Bell Robinson, Head of Catering, British Broadcasting Corporation.
- Robert William Henry Robinson, Process Superintendent, Folland Aircraft, Ltd., Southampton.
- Albert Edward Rolton, Engineer III, Royal Ordnance Factory, Radway Green.
- John Irvine Ross, Senior Executive Officer, No. 7 Maintenance Unit, Royal Air Force, Quedgeley.
- Albert Henry Roullier, JP, Group Secretary (General Workers' Section), No. 1 Region, Transport and General Workers' Union.
- Alfred Henry Rowe. For political services in Morpeth.
- Frank Mogg Ryall. For political and public services in Plymouth and Devonport.
- Alderman Herbert William Rymill. For political and public services in Hastings and St. Leonards.
- Isabel Marguerite Sambidge. For services to the British Legion in South Worcestershire.
- James Wesley Sandford, JP. For public services in County Antrim.
- Charles George Scott, lately Grade 3 Officer, Ministry of Labour.
- Ivy Scott, Executive Officer, Foreign Office.
- Henry Robert Searby, Chairman, South-East Lindsey District Committee, Lindsey/Lincolnshire Agricultural Executive Committees.
- Johnston Berry Cochrane Sherman, General Manager, Workshops for the Blind, Belfast.
- Douglas James Short, Technical Superintendent, Animals Division, National Institute for Medical Research.
- Mary Mackenzie Skinner, County Secretary, Inverness-shire, British Red Cross Society.
- Harold Albert Smale, Higher Clerical Officer, Ministry of Defence.
- Arthur Smart, Organiser, Southern District, National Union of General and Municipal Workers.
- Charles Alfred Smith, Assistant Factory Manager, Post Office Factory, Birmingham.
- Hubert Charles Smith, Manager, Leeds Employment Exchange.
- Lilian Winifred Smith, Clerical Officer Secretary, Air Ministry.
- Mervyn George Smith, Divisional Manager, Mechanical Automation Division, Elliott Brothers (London), Ltd., Lewisham.
- Wilfrid Louis Smith, Superintendent, Staffordshire Constabulary.
- William Wilson Smith, Headmaster, British Families Education Service School, Laarbruch, Germany.
- Laurence James Sowden, Executive Officer, Commonwealth Relations Office.
- Elsie Spencer, Matron, Holmefield Boys' Home, Biggleswade.
- Ernest James Squibb, Senior Executive Officer, Ministry of Pensions and National Insurance.
- William John Sterritt, Staff Officer, Ministry of Labour and National Insurance, Northern Ireland.
- Alexander Walker Stevens, Assistant Secretary, Clyde Navigation Trust.
- Andrew Strang. For political services in the West of Scotland.
- William Alfred Stride, lately Secretary and General Manager, The Sailors' Home and Red Ensign Club, London.
- Frank Owen Sudbury, JP, Chairman, Pembroke and Cardigan Agricultural Wages Committee.
- Doris Annie Surman, County Borough Organiser, Plymouth, Women's Voluntary Services.
- Sylvia Mabel Symonds. For political and public services in Oxford.
- Winifred Ethel Tancock, Grade 3 Officer, Ministry of Labour.
- Alan Hunter Taylor, Higher Executive Officer, War Office.
- Andrew Richard Taylor, Principal, Harding Memorial Primary School, Belfast.
- Lucy Ellen Tennant, lately Senior Executive Officer, Ministry of Pensions and National Insurance.
- Robert Edmonstone Thallon, Head, Technical Information Service, Ministry of Works.
- Howard Charles Thompson, BEM, Chief Civil Defence Warden, Portsmouth.
- Robert Thompson, lately Chairman, East Antrim Hospital Management Committee.
- Samuel Thompson, Senior Assistant Engineer, Appleby Frodingham Steel Co. Ltd., United Steel Companies, Ltd.
- William Thompson, JP, District Commandant, Ulster Special Constabulary.
- William Dewings Thomson. For services to the Northern Ireland milk industry.
- Joseph Mordue Todd, DFC, TD, lately Manager, North Walbottle Colliery, National Coal Board.
- Lena Taylor Toller. For political and public services in Sussex.
- Stanley Harold Tombs, Director and General Manager, Globelite Industries, Ltd., Marsh Barton, Devon.
- Lorenzo Smith Trevan, Deputy Naval Store Officer, HM Dockyard, Devonport.
- Walter Charles Tyrell, Examiner, Tithe Redemption Commission.
- John Vincent, lately Head of the Department of Cookery, Hotel School, Westminster Technical College.
- Florence Vousden, lately Clerical Officer, Warren Spring Laboratory, Department of Scientific and Industrial Research.
- Charles Vedrines Waddell, Electrical Engineer, Cowans Sheldon & Co. Ltd. Carlisle.
- Peter Edward Walker. For political services.
- Mary Isabella Wandless, Headmistress, Valley Infants' School, Whitehaven, Cumberland.
- Hazel Georgina Ward, Voluntary County Organiser, Pembrokeshire, National Federation of Women's Institutes.
- Frederick Guy Wardle. For public services in Nottingham.
- Harold Ewart Watson, Senior Executive Officer, Ministry of Aviation.
- Norah Vaudine Watson, Head Secretary-Typist, County Councils Association.
- Alexander John Watt, lately Agricultural Adviser, Alford and Deeside District, Aberdeenshire.
- Euphemia Mathison Watt, lately Grade 4 Officer, Branch B, Foreign Office.
- Major William Arthur Weaver. For services to the Sea Cadet Corps in Coventry and District.
- Alma Florence Annie Webb, General Office Manager, Association of British Chambers of Commerce.
- Ellen Harrison Webb. For public services and services to education in South Derbyshire.
- James Henry Weir, Chief Officer, Northampton Fire Brigade.
- Frederick Albert Welling, Chairman, Barnet Sea Cadet Corps Unit.
- Elizabeth Wells, Matron, Rookwood Hospital, Llandaff, Cardiff.
- Florence Westley, Chief Superintendent of Typists, Command Ordnance Depot, Donnington, War Office.
- Geoffrey George White, Services Liaison Officer, Germany, War Office.
- Dorothy Edith Whitney, Higher Executive Officer, Ministry of Health.
- Griffith Harry Whittaker, formerly Engineering Technical Class, Grade I, Royal Aircraft Establishment, Ministry of Aviation.
- James Rogerson Wight, Electrical Manager, Scotts' Shipbuilding & Engineering Co. Ltd., Greenock.
- Albert Willey, Member, Scunthorpe Hospital Management Committee and Sheffield No. 4 Hospital Management Committee.
- Beatrice Ellen Williams. For social services in Wrexham, Denbighshire.
- Lizzie Williams, Area Officer, Holyhead, National Assistance Board.
- Harold Edwin Wilson, General Secretary, Institute of Housing.
- Herbert Edward Wilson. For political and public services in Hendon.
- Rosemary Wilson. For political services in Glasgow.
- Florence Mercy Windebank, Ward Sister, National Hospital for Nervous Diseases, London.
- Thomas Joel Wing, Higher Executive Officer, Ministry of Pensions and National Insurance.
- Dorothy Marion Wood, Welfare Worker, Nottingham Council of Social Service.
- Marion Wray, Senior Executive Officer, Ministry of Agriculture, Fisheries and Food.
- John Wren, Chief Superintendent, Lancashire Constabulary.
- Leslie Harding Barnes, Administration Officer, British Military Government, Berlin.
- May Lelia Anne Berry, lately Shorthand-Typist, Her Majesty's Consulate-General, Zurich.
- Leslie Walter Blackwell, lately Her Majesty's Consul, Lisbon.
- John Mackenzie Cameron, British Vice-Consul, Cebu.
- William Louis Cassar, Consular Clerk, Her Majesty's Embassy, Tripoli.
- James Henry Castleton, Officer in charge of United Kingdom Section of Allied Travel and Interzonal Facilities Bureaux, Berlin.
- Thomas Eustace Dutton, British Vice-Consul, Mérida.
- Marie Katharina Eichenberger, British Pro-Consul, Berne.
- Thomas Duncan Gould, LRCP(Ed), LRCS(Ed), British subject resident in Belgium.
- Charles Arthur Green, lately Communications Officer, Office of the United Kingdom Commissioner for Singapore and Commissioner-General for South-East Asia.
- Irene Mary Howlett, Assistant Private Secretary to Her Majesty's Ambassador, Paris.
- Eleanor Jack, British subject resident in the United States of America.
- Mary Rae Keymer, MB, ChB, British subject resident in the Sudan.
- William Hill Lawson, British Consul, Algiers.
- Daisy Annie Mackay, British subject resident in Argentina.
- Demetrius Marc, British Vice-Consul, Samos.
- Marion Audrey Marchbank, Shorthand-Typist, Her Majesty's Embassy, Washington.
- Letitia Emma Neale, Functional Officer, British Council, Mexico City.
- Henry Leopold O'Neal, British Vice-Consul, St. Thomas, Virgin Islands.
- William James Smith, lately Secretary, Paris Branch of the British Legion.
- Julian Fortay Walker, Grade 8 Officer, Branch "A" of the Foreign Service, for services in the Trucial States and Muscat.
- Richard Jeffery Webb, Vice-President, Foreign Colonies Hospital, Barcelona.
- Cordelia Stella Georgette Edith Whitaker, British subject resident in Italy.
- Reginald Rainford Witter, British subject resident in France.
- Francis Alexander York, lately Her Majesty's Consul, Munich.
- John Herbert Anderson, of Yandilla, State of Queensland. For services to Dairying and Local Government.
- Robert James Bain, of Launceston, State of Tasmania. For services to the community.
- John Francis Banks, of Blackall, State of Queensland. For services to Local Government.
- Barry Barker. For services to the United Kingdom community in Bombay, India.
- Paul Barnes, Deputy Superintendent of Police, Federation of Malaya.
- Charles Stewart Cassidy, an electrical engineer, in charge of the Maseru Power and Water Supply, Basutoland.
- Gaositwe Keagakwa Tibe Chiepe, Education Officer, Bechuanaland Protectorate.
- Arthur Mark Cook, formerly Superintendent, Highfield Village Settlement, Southern Rhodesia.
- Cecil George Audley Done, MM, formerly Town Clerk, Toowoomba, State of Queensland.
- Kilner Valentine Dowling. For services to patriotic movements in the State of Victoria.
- Evelyn Doyle, a member of the staff of the Public Services Board, Southern Rhodesia.
- Claude Vivian Drake, JP, Chairman of the Court of General Sessions in the Wynyard Municipality, State of Tasmania.
- Walter Watson Feather, MB, ChM, Medical Superintendent, Roma Hospitals Board, State of Queensland.
- Merle Nellie Graham Finimore, JP, of Ipswich, State of Queensland. For social welfare services.
- David Howells Fleay, a Zoologist, of West Burleigh, State of Queensland.
- Edna May Gill. For services to the United Kingdom community in Colombo, Ceylon.
- Kate Sophie Healy, President, Catholic Women's League, State of South Australia.
- Joyce May Hickes, Principal of the Federation School for the Deaf at Penang, Federation of Malaya.
- Rosalie Susan Hipwell, of Mirboo North, State of Victoria. For social welfare services.
- Herbert Edwin Holt. For services to local Government in the Korong Shire, State of Victoria.
- Aaron Jacha, President of the African Farmers' Union, Southern Rhodesia.
- Raymond Charles Jennings, President of the Bibbenluke Shire Council, State of New South Wales.
- Bertha May Jorgensen, Leader of the Victorian Symphony Orchestra, State of Victoria.
- Doreen Moira Langley, Principal, Women's College, University of Sydney, State of New South Wales.
- Frank Lebentlele, Headmaster of the Basutoland High School.
- William Jamieson Littlejohn, formerly an Emergency Administrative Officer, Federation of Malaya.
- Eva Muriel Lucas. For services to the Blind in the State of Western Australia.
- Achim Mathule, Assistant Agricultural and Livestock Officer, Basutoland.
- Frederick Frazer Mills. For services to Local Government in Clermont, State of Queensland.
- Elaine Moran. For services to the Girl Guide Movement in the State of Victoria.
- Leslie Moseley, State Secretary, Sailors, Soldiers and Airmen's Fathers' Association of the State of South Australia.
- Dorothy Lilian Munn, Honorary Secretary of Coronation Cottages for Old People, Southern Rhodesia.
- Septimus Scuffan Sanderson. For honorary services in connection with the Dogs' Rescue Home, State of South Australia.
- Norman Lewis Sharpe, Manager of the Peat and Milson Islands Mental Hospital, State of New South Wales.
- Betty Stubbs, Education Officer, Swaziland.
- Rivers Fendall Thompson, Judicial Commissioner, Basutoland.
- Kathleen Alice Tofft, of Campbell Town, State of Tasmania. For social welfare services.
- Maurice Philip Charles Went, a Trade Unionist, of Southern Rhodesia.
- Elsie Jane Whicker, Superintendent, Bush Nursing Association, State of New South Wales.
- Ethel Mary White. For services to the United Kingdom community in Pakistan.
- Marguerite Adam, Confidential Clerk, to the Governor, Mauritius.
- Alhaji Ahmadu, Galadiman Daura, District Head, Mai'aduwa District, Northern Region, Nigeria.
- Nathaniel Akindele Akingbehin, Principal Meteorological Officer, Federation of Nigeria.
- Wilberforce Edward Alagoa, Education Officer, Eastern Region, Nigeria.
- Shanitilal Ravishanker Anantani, Assistant Government Passages Agent, Tanganyika.
- Anthony Joseph Proto Antao. For services to social welfare in Nyasaland.
- Leonard Edward Arnold, Pathologist, Police Department, Jamaica.
- Dolarrai Hiralal Avashia, Chief Clerk, Supreme Court, Civil Side, Nairobi, Kenya.
- Ali Bahadur, Assistant Superintendent, East African Posts and Telecommunications Administration.
- Maggie Estelle Bartlett, Confidential Records Officer, Chief Secretary's Office, Barbados.
- Hugh Llewellyn Bennett, Senior Laboratory Technician, Medical Department, British Honduras.
- Stefan Bergander, Executive Engineer, Grade I, Ministry of Works and Transport, Western Region, Nigeria.
- Tahempton Jehangirji Bhumgara. For public services in Zanzibar.
- Eugene Bonello. For services to sport in Malta.
- John Staveley Boumphrey, Administrative Assistant, Grade IV, General Manager's Office, East African Railways and Harbours.
- Beryl Katherine Elizabeth Bransgrove. For public services in Tanganyika.
- Edgar Samuel Bridgewater. For services to music in St. Kitts.
- Elizabeth Grace Browning, Woman Education Officer, Gambia.
- Lystra Josephine Charles. For public services in Trinidad.
- Gwendoline Vera Clark. For public services in the Western Region, Nigeria.
- Charles Jonathan Clarke, Deputy Registering Officer, Gambia.
- William Stewart Clayton, Ranch Manager, Tanganyika Agricultural Corporation, Kongwa.
- Dionysius Silvestinus Cole. For public services in the Northern Region, Nigeria.
- Louise Bennett Coverlet. For services to dramatic art in Jamaica.
- Kate Elizabeth Crust. For public services in Northern Rhodesia.
- Olive Elizabeth Curties, Personal Secretary, Grade II, Federation of Nigeria.
- Oba Timothy Talabi Dada, The Olotta of Otta, Western Region, Nigeria.
- Leopoldo Cipriano da Gama, Law Clerk, Office of Attorney-General, Uganda.
- Alhaji Danwawu. For public services in the Northern Region, Nigeria.
- Marion Emily Darke, Woman Education Officer, Somaliland Protectorate.
- Hilary da Silva. For public services in St. Vincent.
- Sydney Joseph Dedier, Head Teacher, Santa Cruz Primary Roman Catholic School, Trinidad.
- William Michael Dickinson, Administrative Officer, Somaliland Protectorate.
- William Alexander Doust, Senior Laboratory Technologist, Kenya.
- William John Dupigny, Registrar of Trade Unions, Sierra Leone.
- Francis Harvey Edmondson. For public services in Bermuda.
- Matthew Ojeme Elebesunu, Assistant Controller (Staff), Posts and Telegraphs Division, Ministry of Communications, Federation of Nigeria.
- Aret Okon Etim, Senior Nursing Sister, Eastern Region, Nigeria.
- Nellie Fagan. For public services in the New Hebrides.
- Jack Fairhurst, District Commissioner, Luwingu, Northern Rhodesia.
- Catherine Farrell, lately Senior Health Sister, Northern Region, Nigeria.
- Ruby Irene Franker, Librarian, Public Free Library, British Guiana.
- Mallam Umaru Gana, Rural Health Superintendent, Malaria Unit, Endemic Diseases Division of Ministry of Health, Northern Region, Nigeria.
- Ayoub Gopaul, Area Superintendent, Education Department, Mauritius.
- Carmel Grech, Higher Clerical Officer, Malta.
- Peter Greening, Agricultural Officer, Northern Rhodesia.
- Wilfred Haresign, Works Manager, Sierra Leone Railway.
- George Ratcliffe Hemming. For public services in Fiji.
- William Alfred Hoare, Government Printer, British Honduras.
- Joseph Paul Hopkins, Agricultural Superintendent, Sierra Leone.
- Jacob Onaba Kamodan Inyoin, District Officer, Uganda.
- Samuel Clifford Jacobs. For public services in Grenada.
- Frank Read James, Inspecting Engineer, Crown Agents for Oversea Governments and Administrations.
- William Frederick Cecil Jenner, Government Printer, Hong Kong.
- Mary Johnson. For services to Education in Nyasaland.
- Chief Kadwere, Head of Native Authority in the Blantyre District, Nyasaland.
- John Ogunyale Kalejaiye, Workshop Supervisor, Nigerian Railway Corporation.
- Eileen Ethel Sylvester King, Matron, Aden.
- Brian Edmond Redshaw Kirwan, Community Development Officer, Uganda.
- Moipei Ole Kodonyo, President, Kajiado African Court, Kenya.
- Stephen Kodovaru. For public services in the British Solomon Islands Protectorate.
- Gertrude Shuk-Luen Kwok. For public services in Hong Kong.
- Josiah Lawale Lasebikan, Office Assistant (Chief Clerk), Federation of Nigeria.
- Lau Han Choon. For services to sport in Sarawak.
- Leonard Gregory Laurent, Superintendent of Mails, British Guiana.
- Jean Le Mesurier Layers. For services to education in Kenya.
- Lee En Min, Assistant District Surveyor, Lands and Surveys Department, North Borneo.
- Ambrose Lim. For public services in North Borneo.
- Joseph Felix Guy Lionnet, Senior Technical Officer, Seychelles.
- The Reverend Frank Hollis Longley, Head of the Badagry/Abeokuta Circuit of the Methodist Mission, Western Region, Nigeria.
- Keki Shavakshaw Madon, Assistant Secretary and Clerk to the Legislative Council, Zanzibar.
- Muriel Millicent Manley, MB, BS. For public services in Jamaica.
- Ernest Kofele Martin. For public services in the Southern Cameroons.
- William Kimutai Martin, Secretary/Treasurer of the Kipsigis African District Council, Kenya.
- Charles Francis Mas Sally. For public services in Sierra Leone.
- Crichton Slight Mitchell, Principal Agricultural Supervisor, Northern Rhodesia.
- Ronald George Morgan. For public services in Nyasaland.
- Louis Septaime Mowbray, Curator of Bermuda Government Aquarium, Museum and Zoo.
- Sheikh Mohamed Sirad Sheikh Musa, BEM, Chief Kadi, Somaliland Protectorate.
- Wallace Newton, Senior Examiner of Accounts, St. Lucia.
- Panos Basil Nicholas. For public services in the Eastern Region, Nigeria.
- Michael Bazze Nsimbi, Education Officer, Uganda.
- David Edward William O'Brien, Superintendent of Police, Hong Kong.
- Moses Anizoba Odita, Higher Executive Officer, Eastern Region, Nigeria.
- Solomon Ayodabo Ogunnaike, Baggage Officer, Ministry of Works, Federation of Nigeria.
- Benjamin Olatunji Oguntimein, Labour Relations Officer, Ministry of Works and Transport, Western Region, Nigeria.
- Peter Nwaokonkwo Okoye, Inspector of Works, Public Works Department, Eastern Region, Nigeria.
- Chief Michael Adeosun Oso Olurin, JP, President, Grade "B" Customary Court, Ilaro, Western Region, Nigeria.
- Dunstan Alfred Omari, Administrative Officer Class III, Tanganyika.
- Josephine Elizabeth Osborne. For public services in Dominica.
- Lawrence Willey Pepple, Senior Produce Officer, Eastern Region, Nigeria.
- Cyril Oyebola Phillips, Principal Agricultural Superintendent, Western Region, Nigeria.
- The Reverend Sister Emma Rainford. For services to education and social work in British Guiana.
- Frederick Salt, Superintendent, Mental Hospital, Kuching, Sarawak.
- Peter Paul Scicluna. For public services in Malta.
- Becharlal Dwarkadas Shah, Education Officer, Tanganyika.
- Sham Pak-Ying, Station Officer, Fire Brigade, Hong Kong.
- Shin Tak-Hing. For social services in Hong Kong.
- Deodatt Singh. For services to the Boy Scout movement in Fiji.
- Gurdial Singh, lately Senior Clerical Officer, East African Posts and Telecommunications Administration.
- Florence Louise Skinner, Assistant Office Superintendent, East Africa High Commission.
- Patricia Smith. For social services in Gibraltar.
- Joseph Stravens, Government Printer, Seychelles.
- Tafuna, Senior Chief of the Lungu Tribe, Northern Rhodesia.
- Beatrice Mary Thoms. For services to the Girl Guide movement in Nyasaland.
- Mubarak Assahm al Toselli, Junior Assistant Adviser, Western Aden Protectorate.
- Leslie William Herbert Tuffill, Chief Office Supervisor, Secretariat, Aden.
- The Reverend Setareki Akeai Tuilovoni, Director of the Young Peoples' Department of the Methodist Mission, Fiji.
- Shambushanker Jathashanker Vyas. For public services in Kenya.
- Yekoniya Bifuwo Walukamba, Secretary for Agriculture and Forestry, Busoga African Local Government, Uganda.
- Wilma Nora Wintle, Senior Sister Tutor, Tanganyika.
- Edward Hammond Williams, MB, BS. For public services in Uganda.
- Wong Wai-Tsoi, Divisional Officer, Fire Brigade, Hong Kong.
- Joyce Elizabeth Woodstock, Assistant Controller, Grade I, Posts and Telegraphs Department, Jamaica.

=== Companion of the Imperial Service Order (ISO) ===
Home Civil Service

- Andrew Livingstone Borthwick, Assistant Accountant, Office of the Accountant of Court, Scotland. (Edinburgh).
- Phyllis Valerie Carr, Chief Executive Officer, Ministry of Pensions and National Insurance. (St. Annes on Sea).
- Bernard Rose Cody, lately Chief Executive Officer, National Savings Committee. (Thorpe Bay).
- Frank Percival John Dockrill, School Principal and Chief Regional Training Officer, Home Counties Region, General Post Office. (Bletchley).
- Wilfred Ernest Dockrill, Chief Executive Officer, Air Ministry. (Rustington).
- Walter Elrick, Actuary, Government Actuary's Department. (New Barnet).
- Charles Henry Fone, MBE, Grade 1A Officer, Branch B, Foreign Office. (South Croydon).
- William Edward Seymour Harvey, lately Principal Executive Officer, Home Office. (Guildford).
- Edwin Noel Horne, MBE, Chief Executive Officer, Colonial Office. (Brighton).
- Robert Kay, JP, Grade 2 Officer, Ministry of Labour. (Cults, Aberdeenshire).
- Thomas Lacey, Principal, Department of Scientific and Industrial Research. (Burgess Hill).
- James William Lambie, Chief Executive Officer, Civil Service Commission. (Welwyn Garden City).
- Thomas McKail, Senior Inspector, Board of Customs and Excise. (London W.2).
- James McMullan, Commissioner of Valuation, Ministry of Finance for Northern Ireland. (Belfast).
- Frank William Mugridge, MBE, Chief Executive Officer, Ministry of Aviation. (West Ewell).
- Edward John Palmer, Chief Executive Officer, Board of Trade. (Seaford).
- Eric Wigley Pratt, Senior Principal Scientific Officer, Admiralty. (Woking).
- Thomas Henry Pritchard, Deputy Director of Contracts, Ministry of Works. (Long Ditton).
- Leonard Nelson Reffell, Principal, War Office. (Enfield).
- Leslie Charles Ridley, MBE, Chief Executive Officer, Lord Chancellor's Office. (Barnet).
- Horace Edward Roberts, Chief Executive Officer, Ministry of Transport. (Cheam).
- William Albert Rolph, Principal, General Register Office. (Sutton).
- Reginald John Telling, Senior Chief Executive Officer, Ministry of Education. (Banstead).
- Leonard Albert Warr, Principal, Board of Inland Revenue. (Wallington).
- Frank Reginald Williams, Principal, Ministry of Agriculture, Fisheries and Food. (Sutton).

Australian States and Southern Rhodesia

- Arthur Valentine Curwen Fortescue Hubbard, Accountant, Central Mechanical Equipment Department, Southern Rhodesia.
- Henry Norman Jones, Secretary, Department of Labour and Industry, State of Victoria.
- Frederick John McNally, Chairman, Children's Welfare and Public Relief Board, State of South Australia.

Overseas Civil Service

- Philip Ashby Allison, lately Conservator of Forests, Western Region, Nigeria.
- Bernard Ian Bickford, Secretary, Medical and Health Department, Hong Kong.
- Willy Bourdet, Postmaster-General, Mauritius.
- Augustus Elendu Eronini, Clerk to the Eastern Legislature, Eastern Region, Nigeria.
- Aloysius Emil Ibreck, Scholarships Secretary, Education Department, Uganda.
- Abdul Karim, Assistant Secretary, Scale A, Sierra Leone.
- Stanley Charles Sinclair, Principal Immigration Officer, Tanganyika.
- William Arthur Spradbrow, Government Printer, North Borneo.
- James Arnold Sweeney, MBE, lately Assistant Commissioner of Police, Kenya.
- Evan Thomson Wood, Treasurer, Turks and Caicos Islands.

=== British Empire Medal (BEM) ===
Military Division

Royal Navy

- Chief Petty Officer Shaibu Ajayi Ajinomo, Royal Nigerian Navy.
- Master-at-Arms Eric Albert Henry Bentley, P/MX.768062.
- Chief Petty Officer Ronald William Brotherton, C/JX.158830.
- Chief Petty Officer Steward Carmelo Buhagiar, E/LX.21774.
- Quartermaster Sergeant Bernard Walter Bullimore, Ch.X.2663, Royal Marines.
- Leading Wren Sheila June Valerie Craven, 111227, Women's Royal Naval Service.
- Chief Radio Communication Supervisor Kenneth George Dence, P/JX.138305.
- Chief Engineering Mechanic Wilfred Harold Dingley, P/KX.87110.
- Chief Communication Yeoman Harold Downer, Q.991308, Royal Naval Reserve.
- Chief Petty Officer Harry Gilbert Dudley, P/JX.126225.
- Chief Shipwright Artificer Eric Geoffrey Ethell, C/MX.53802.
- Chief Electrical Artificer (Air) James Ewart, L/FX.78689.
- Chief Engineering Mechanic Ronald Francis Francis, C/KX.93235.
- Chief Electrician (Air) Michael Edward Hall, L/FX.82634.
- Chief Engine Room Artificer Percy Edward Hills, C/MX.61635.
- Chief Radio Electrical Artificer Kenneth Albert Wheeler Bobbins, D/MX.667789.
- Chief Electrical Artificer Norman Henry Thomas Hogg, D/MX.50900.
- Chief Engineering Mechanic William Gordon Hopper, C/KX.84034.
- Chief Petty Officer Writer Leonard Stuart Hopping, D/MX.54184.
- Chief Petty Officer Steward Kenneth Edgar James Howard, P/LX.21486.
- Chief Aircraft Artificer Donald Hullah, L/FX.78299.
- Colour Sergeant James Anthony Kelly, RMV200321, Royal Marine Forces Volunteer Reserve.
- Chief Petty Officer Arthur Lacey, C/JX.153445.
- Sick Berth Chief Petty Officer Frederick Montague Lenton, P/M.38913.
- Chief Air Fitter William Rennie McGibbon, L/FX790020.
- Chief Petty Officer Cook (S) Stanley Frederick Mitchell, P/MX.51657.
- Quartermaster Sergeant James Albert Richardson, Ch.X.2635, Royal Marines.
- Chief Petty Officer John Walter Sharpe, DSM, P/JX.129930.
- Chief Petty Officer Everard William Greenfield Tyson, D/JX.139709.
- Yvonne Wallington, Head VAD Nursing Member.

Army

- S/5725875 Staff-Sergeant Harry George Anley, Royal Army Service Corps.
- 6350105 Staff-Sergeant William Bass, Royal Pioneer Corps.
- T/71815 Staff-Sergeant John Garth Beck, Royal Army Service Corps.
- 22535375 Staff-Sergeant (Artillery Clerk) John Thorold Bentley, Royal Regiment of Artillery, Territorial Army.
- T/149616 Staff-Sergeant Stephen Patrick Bergin, Royal Army Service Corps.
- 22982984 Colour-Sergeant Eric Frank Bowles, The Gloucestershire Regiment, Territorial Army.
- 2734335 Warrant Officer Class II (acting) Hugh Charles William Brawn, Welsh Guards.
- 22570073 Sergeant William Harrison Burnham, Army Catering Corps, Territorial Army.
- S/21016519 Corporal Charles Stuart Butcher, Royal Army Service Corps, Territorial Army.
- NA/49872 Company Sergeant-Major Leke Chinjina, The Queen's Own Nigeria Regiment.
- 4389672 Staff-Sergeant (acting) Bernard David Colclough, Corps of Royal Engineers.
- W/105561 Sergeant (acting) Mary Miller Deans, Women's Royal Army Corps.
- 22542282 Sergeant Derrick Norman Allan Dienn, Corps of Royal Engineers.
- 22211341 Staff-Sergeant William Thomas George Dorman, Corps of Royal Engineers, Territorial Army.
- 949790 Sergeant William Francis Joseph Duffy, Royal Regiment of Artillery; attached Army Air Corps.
- 21016932 Sergeant Alexander Gibson Duncan, Army Catering Corps, Territorial Army.
- 157422 Sergeant William Arthur Elston, Army Catering Corps.
- 6978133 Sergeant Henry Erskine, The Royal Inniskilling Fusiliers.
- W/374696 Sergeant (acting) Norah Leece Faragher, Women's Royal Army Corps.
- 2610603 Sergeant Ernest William Fisher, Grenadier Guards.
- 22235549 Staff-Sergeant John Edward Eraser, Corps of Royal Engineers.
- S/888786 Staff-Sergeant William Harold Gardiner, Royal Army Service Corps.
- 380678 Staff-Sergeant (Artillery Clerk) Christopher Charles Glynn, Royal Regiment of Artillery.
- 21139663 Sergeant (acting) Gyanbahadur Limbu, 7th Duke of Edinburgh's Own Gurkha Rifles.
- 14498343 Staff-Sergeant Frederick John Hammett, Corps of Royal Engineers.
- 22803093 Warrant Officer Class II (acting) Cyril Frederick Holland, The Northamptonshire Regiment.
- 14446027 Warrant Officer Class II (acting) Ronald Hornby, Royal Corps of Signals.
- 11420506 Staff-Sergeant Robert James Howard, Corps of Royal Engineers.
- T/4182651 Staff-Sergeant Arthur William Hurst, Royal Army Service Corps, Territorial Army.
- 14081787 Staff-Sergeant Leonard Victor William Ings, Royal Corps of Signals.
- 22276396 Sergeant Sydney Norman Jackson, Corps of Royal Military Police.
- 22824173 Staff-Sergeant (acting) Arnold Johnson, Corps of Royal Electrical and Mechanical Engineers.
- CAR/1060 Regimental Sergeant-Major Elija Kilonzo Kinhowe, Fifth Battalion The King's African Rifles.
- 22241796 Squadron Quartermaster-Sergeant Alexander Lamont, The Cheshire Yeomanry (Earl of Chester's), Royal Armoured Corps, Territorial Army.
- T/19036810 Sergeant Robert Anthony Marshall, Royal Army Service Corps.
- 22548148 Warrant Officer Class II (acting) (now Sergeant) John Martin, The Royal Highland Fusiliers (Princess Margaret's Own Glasgow and Ayrshire Regiment).
- 22781583 Colour-Sergeant George Alexander McBratney, The Royal Irish Fusiliers (Princess Victoria's), Territorial Army.
- S/22222240 Sergeant Norman McCarthy, Royal Army Service Corps.
- 7691875 Sergeant John Sibbald McGaw, Corps of Royal Military Police.
- 884212 Staff-Sergeant (acting) Herbert Lorrimore Mitchell, Army Catering Corps.
- T/21016472 Sergeant Maurice Anthony Murphy, Royal Army Service Corps.
- 14461821 Sergeant David William Rosebrook Ryer, Corps of Royal Electrical and Mechanical Engineers.
- SLA/36370 Regimental Sergeant-Major Abu Brima Seisay, The Sierra Leone Regiment.
- S/19042608 Warrant Officer Class II (acting) Lawrence Frederick Stephens, Royal Army Service Corps.
- 2717967 Colour-Sergeant Keith Melhado Thomas, Irish Guards.
- 2549239 Warrant Officer Class II (acting) Kenneth Ernest Tiley, Royal Army Ordnance Corps.
- 14469612 Sergeant Wilfred Arthur Alfred Walker, Corps of Royal Electrical and Mechanical Engineers.
- T/22519387 Sergeant William Williams, Royal Army Service Corps.
- 21017314 Staff-Sergeant (Provisional Warrant Officer Class II) Thomas Windas, Royal Army Medical Corps, Territorial Army.
- 22996190 Staff-Sergeant (acting) Ronald George Wright, The Parachute Regiment; attached Army Air Corps.
- W/366184 Sergeant (acting) Eleanor Mary Young, Women's Royal Army Corps.

Royal Air Force

- 1294834 Flight Sergeant Noel Ball.
- 527636 Flight Sergeant John Connell.
- 566242 Flight Sergeant (now Warrant Officer) George Stanley Day.
- 520997 Flight Sergeant John Dunnington.
- 1478529 Flight Sergeant John Albert Farey.
- 578621 Flight Sergeant (now Pilot Officer) Ray Gardner.
- 432593 Flight Sergeant Elizabeth Hunter, Women's Royal Air Force.
- 570402 Flight Sergeant Ronald Cecil Kidd.
- 566751 Flight Sergeant Thomas Porter.
- 563915 Flight Sergeant (now Warrant Officer) Reginald James Pudney.
- 562281 Flight Sergeant Victor Maynard Reed.
- 1161904 Flight Sergeant Harry Bertie Saunders.
- 981500 Flight Sergeant William Alfred Schofield.
- 530092 Flight Sergeant Arthur Charles Wright.
- 577225 Chief Technician Thomas James Evenden.
- 815037 Chief Technician Harry Fogg.
- 636926 Chief Technician Thomas Hetherington.
- 366241 Chief Technician Reginald Henry Logan.
- 537835 Chief Technician Roy Dixon Murray.
- 623652 Chief Technician William John Nicholson.
- 535277 Chief Technician Walter Endley Williams.
- 902624 Acting Flight Sergeant Guy Bertram Bennett.
- 938867 Acting Flight Sergeant Stanley Joseph Bevan, Royal Air Force Regiment.
- 544574 Acting Flight Sergeant Reginald Herbert Cummings.
- 2078928 Acting Flight Sergeant Lily Howard, Women's Royal Air Force.
- 1352411 Acting Flight Sergeant Terence McCall.
- 435995 Acting Flight Sergeant Jean Elizabeth Macfarlane, Women's Royal Air Force.
- 1219388 Sergeant Henry Ashley.
- 585790 Sergeant Geoffery Stuart Batterbee.
- 3503387 Sergeant Campbell Johnson Bryan.
- 2024113 Sergeant Evelyn Hilda Eunice Chiverton, Women's Royal Air Force.
- 584967 Sergeant Brian Arthur Clayton.
- 998434 Sergeant Stanley Gallagher.
- 584956 Sergeant Roy Harrington.
- 3512702 Sergeant Kenneth Clifford Albert Hart.
- 541885 Sergeant William John Hewitt.
- 571335 Sergeant Clarence Roland Marsh.
- 412361 Sergeant Alfred Geoffrey Niven.
- 538382 Sergeant Robert Watson.
- 4001068 Senior Technician Ronald Leslie Spidey.
- 541046 Senior Technician Leonard George Stanley.
- 4013956 Acting Sergeant Clifford Furness Clarke.
- 4186258 Corporal Patrick Alan Coley.
- 2784869 Corporal Edward McEwan.
- 4020668 Corporal Ronald Henry George Williams.

Civil Division
United Kingdom

- Frederick Charles Ackerman, Foreman Propeller Patternmaker, J. Stone & Company (Charlton) Ltd. (London SE.6).
- David Kelso Algie, Principal Overlooker, Royal Ordnance Factory, Bishopton, Renfrewshire. (Paisley).
- Irene Allison, JP, Centre Organiser, Pocklington Rural District, Women's Voluntary Service.
- Thomas Carbury Amos, Station Officer, HM Coastguard, Nell's Point, Barry Island, Glamorganshire.
- John Goodwin Anderson, Assistant Foreman Electrician, Vickers Armstrongs (Shipbuilders) Ltd. (Barrow-in-Furness).
- Charles George Andrews, Senior Assistant (Scientific), National Chemical Laboratory, Department of Scientific and Industrial Research. (Hanworth).
- Sidney Arthur Atterton, Deputy Office Keeper, Grade III, Ministry of Transport. (London SE.21).
- John Edward Aucott, Non-Technical Grade III, Armament Research and Development Establishment, War Office. (London SE.2).
- Jack Austin, Distribution Foreman, Hither Green Depot, South Eastern Gas Board. (London SE.15).
- Alfred Charles Victor Baker, Foreman of Model Shop, EMI Electronics Ltd. (Greenford).
- George Baker, Foreman Corebuilder, Associated Electrical Industries (Rugby) Ltd., Rugby.
- Ernest John Victor Barnes, Head Warden, Civil Defence Corps, Kendal.
- George Edward Barnes, Detective Sub-Inspector, War Department Constabulary, Central Ordnance Depot, Bicester.
- Samuel Barnes, Special Constable, City of Glasgow Police.
- John Thomas Baxter, Agricultural Worker, Irnham Estates, Grantham.
- George Henry Betts, Driver, Mechanical Transport, Royal Air Force, Hawkinge. (Folkestone).
- Charles Frederick Biddiscombe, Ship's Butcher, SS Andes, Royal Mail Lines Ltd. (Southampton).
- Thomas Blaney, Senior Rescue Instructor, Civil Defence Corps, Stirling Burgh Division. (Stirling).
- Phyllis Bontoft, Head Telephonist, HM Embassy, Paris.
- Olive Maud Botting, Chief Supervisor, Royal Telephone Exchange, General Post Office. (London SE.13).
- Elizabeth M. Boyd, Collector, Street Savings Group, Newtownhamilton, County Armagh.
- Robert Wallis Bray, Assistant Divisional Officer, Portsmouth Fire Brigade. (Southsea).
- John Brennan, Overseer, Head Post Office, Harrogate.
- Lieutenant-Commander Albert Francis Barclay Bridges (Retd), Civil Defence Officer, Wokingham Borough.
- William George Charles Brown, Chief Inspector, St. Helier Police Force, Jersey. (St. Lawrence, Jersey).
- Philip Charles Norman Browne, Deputy County Commandant, Northumberland Special Constabulary. (Ponteland).
- Kathleen Mary Brushwood. For welfare services to the Territorial and Auxiliary Forces Association for West Riding of Yorkshire. (Leeds).
- Wilfrid Cheadle, Leading Stoker, Chadderton Power Station, Central Electricity Generating Board. (Oldham).
- Arthur Samuel Clark, Chief Instructor, No. 155 (Maidenhead) Squadron, Air Training Corps. (Langley).
- Alexander Whitla Colville, Head Instructor, Ulster Special Constabulary. (Belfast).
- Alexandras Constantinides, Foreman of Trades, Class I, Air Ministry, Akrotiri, Cyprus.
- Reginald Cooke, Volunteer-in-Charge, Coast Life Saving Corps, Pett Level, near Hastings.
- John James Coffins, Skilled Labourer, HM Dockyard, Sheerness.
- George Frederick Coppock, Principal Foreman of Stores, Royal Air Force, Heywood.
- Arthur James Henry Copsey, Transport Officer, British Council. (London N.7).
- Lilian May Cornwall, Senior Chargehand, Electronics Group, Plessey Co. Ltd. (Chadwell Heath).
- Charles Crescimanno, Local Electrical Fitter Supervisor, Admiralty, Malta.
- William Croughan, Chef, SS Reina Del Mar, Pacific Steam Navigation Company. (Liverpool).
- Robert Cumming, Sub-Postmaster, Dairy, Castle Douglas.
- James Cuthbert, Head Foreman Fitter, Austin & Pickersgill Ltd., Sunderland.
- Arthur Dalton, Stores Superintendent, British Families Education Service, War Office, Germany.
- Sidney Gordon Daly, lately Foreman, T. J. Smith & Nephew, Ltd., Hull.
- Simon Diamond, Electrician, Ministry of Works. (London SW.12).
- William Henry Dixon, Shop Foreman Fitter, T. R. Dowson & Co. Ltd., South Shields.
- Gary Charles Dorey, Foreman, Tom Parker (Fareham) Ltd., Charity Farm, Fareham. (Droxford).
- Francis Duggan, Glazier, The Mond Nickel Co. Ltd. (Swansea).
- Arthur Edgar Dyer, Regimental Quartermaster Sergeant, Cheltenham College Combined Cadet Force.
- Arthur William Eames, Chief Inspector, Travelling Post Office, General Post Office. (Ilford).
- Jesse Thomas Elliott, Airport Foreman III, Stansted Airport, Ministry of Aviation. (Takeley, Essex).
- William Patrick Elms, DSM, lately Fitter Airframe, RAF Technical College, Henlow. (Hitchin).
- Ernest George Findlater, Chief Officer, Class II, Polmont Borstal Institution, Scottish Home Department. (Brightens, near Falkirk).
- Eleanor Mary Ruth Fisher, Senior Scientific Assistant, Atomic Energy Research Establishment, Harwell. (Wantage).
- Elizabeth Fry, lately Weaver, Smyth's Weaving Co. Ltd., Banbridge. (County Down).
- Mary Christina Ann Gale, Collector, Street Savings Group, Eastleigh, Hampshire.
- Miriam Eliza Gilmore, Supervisor, Windsor Telephone Exchange, General Post Office.
- James Murray Gilmour, Sergeant-Major Instructor (Cumnock) Cadet Co. Royal Scots Fusiliers. (Cumnock).
- Robert William Goddard, Verger, St. Oswald's Garrison Church, War Office, Catterick.
- John William Powell Goodhall, Senior Paperkeeper, Cabinet Office. (London N.7).
- Alice Goodier, Voluntary Canteen Worker, Manchester "Trafalgar" Unit, Sea Cadet Corps.
- Charles William Gray, Chief Viewer (Textile), Admiralty Storage Depot, Risley. (Warrington).
- Charles Alfred Green, Labourer, Eastern Electricity Board. (London N.9).
- Joseph Bradford Grieves, Checkweighman, Dudley Colliery, National Coal Board. (Dudley).
- Allan Cecil Griffin, Chief Warder, HM Tower of London. (London EC.3).
- May Louise Ashdown Grindrod. For services to the Women's Voluntary Service and Other social work in Machynlleth District, Montgomeryshire.
- Ernest James Stuart Hall, Head Gardener, Northern Region, Commonwealth War Graves Commission.
- Bessie Hepworth Hamilton, Collector, Fleming Square Street Savings Group, Maryport.
- Henry Hammond, DCM, Collector, Hall Lane Savings Group, Chingford, London.
- Frances Harrison. For charitable services in Camberley and Frimley.
- Peter Hastie, Mechanisation Team Leader, Scottish Division, National Coal Board. (Hill of Beath, Fife).
- Willie Hawksworth, Power Loader Operator, Rockingham Colliery, National Coal Board. (Barnsley).
- Frederick Herapath, Foreman Steeplejack, M. Macdonald & Company (Steeplejacks) Ltd., Nottingham.
- Leonard E. Higgs, Signals Officer, Headquarters Section, Civil Defence Corps, St. Pancras. (London NW.1).
- Alistair Hill, Garage Foreman, HM Stationery Office. (Sidcup).
- Stella MacCaig Holloway, Communications Officer, Grade IV, Birdlip Radio Station, Ministry of Aviation. (Shurdington).
- Margaret Hannah Hughes, Collector, Park Avenue Street Savings Group, Flint, North Wales.
- Beatrice Gladys Hyde, Chief Supervisor, Pinner Telephone Exchange, General Post Office.
- Harry Hyde, Manager, Printing Department, E. Illingworth & Co. Ltd., Shipley.
- Charles Taylor Imrie, Assistant Divisional Officer, South-Eastern Area Fire Brigade, Scotland. (Edinburgh).
- Anthony John Isaacson, Industrial Worker, Ministry of Agriculture, Fisheries and Food. (Soham, Cambridgeshire).
- Reginald Arthur Jerrard, Draughtsman, Grade III, Ordnance Survey Department, Southampton.
- George Henry Johnson, Shearsman, The Steel Company of Wales Ltd. (Port Talbot).
- Trevor Nelson Jones, Post Warden, Newport Civil Defence Corps.
- George Kennedy, Control Engineer, Dalmarnock Generating Station, South of Scotland Electricity Board. (Rutherglen).
- Henry Kisby, Deputy Overman, Wearmouth Colliery, National Coal Board. (Sunderland).
- Hilda Knowles, Collector, Vapron Road Street Savings Group, Plymouth.
- John William Knowles, Poultry Assistant, Land Settlement Association Ltd. (Great Abington, Cambridgeshire).
- Walter Edwin Knowles, Technician IIA, Telephone Manager's Office, Gloucester.
- John Lacey, Educational and Vocational Training Instructor, Royal Naval Barracks, Chatham. (Strood).
- Frederick Roy Languth, Chief Observer, Post 1/C, No. 1 Group, Royal Observer Corps. (Farnborough).
- Charles Stewart Touzeau Lavers, Chief Observer, Post 5/C, No. 5 Group, Royal Observer Corps. (St Albans).
- Edward David Francis Lawrence, Research and Development Craftsman Special, Royal Aircraft Establishment, Ministry of Aviation. (Camberley).
- David John Lewis, JP, Salvage and Economy Officer, Cwmgwrach Colliery, National Coal Board. (Aberdare).
- Frederick Charles Love, Foreman, Central Ammunition Depot, War Office. (Carlisle).
- Sidney Percy Lovell, Postman, Higher Grade, Western District, General Post Office. (London W.7).
- Harry Lugg, Chargehand, Royal Arsenal Estate, War Office. (London SE.2).
- James McDonald, Foreman Boilermaker, Drypool Engineering & Dry Dock Co. Ltd., Hull.
- James W. Macdonald, Superintendent of Fishmarket Porters, Aberdeen.
- John Macdonald, Boatswain, Fishery Cruiser Fleet, Scottish Home Department. (Edinburgh).
- Hector MacIntyre, Quartermaster, Merchant Navy General Service. (South Uist).
- Mary Maguire, Nursing Auxiliary, Queen's Hospital, Croydon.
- Agnes McCullough Mawhinney, Manager, Crown Hotel, Wetheral, State Management District.
- Arthur Mead, Check Measurer, Kirkby Colliery, National Coal Board. (Kirkby-in-Ashfield).
- George Edwin Morse, Collector, Works and Staff Savings Groups, Doncaster Wagon Co. Ltd. (Doncaster).
- Richard Vyvyan Nelms, Pitman, Abercynon Colliery, National Coal Board. (Mountain Ash).
- Charles Leslie Oakes, Assistant Technical Officer (Engineer), Imperial Chemical Industries Ltd. (Redcar).
- William Odie, Boatswain, Merchant Navy General Service. (Aberdeen).
- Robert Hugh Owen, JP, High Tension Linesman, Caernarvon District, Merseyside and North Wales Electricity Board. (Llanberis).
- Arthur Charles Pagden, Sectional Supplies Superintendent, General Post Office. (London N.7).
- Leonard Arthur Palmer, Sergeant (Second Class, CID), Metropolitan Police. (Banstead).
- Alfred Parkins, Chef, Admiralty (London) Luncheon Club. (Harrow).
- Muljibhai Khushalbhai Patel, Clerk Grade I, Command Pay Office, War Office, Kenya.
- Leonard Robert Charles Percival, Foreman (Technical Grade II), Rocket Propulsion Establishment, Ministry of Aviation, Westcott. (Aylesbury).
- Morris Perkins, Technical Officer, Galashiels, General Post Office.
- Frederick Ross Pettyfer, Technical Officer, Telephone Manager's Office, Bournemouth.
- Agnes Pittendreigh, Member of the Women's Voluntary Service, Aberdeen City.
- Arthur Richard Powell, Station Master, Charing Cross, London Transport Executive. (Erith).
- Florence Ethel Priestley, Centre Organiser, Benfleet Urban District, Women's Voluntary Service. (South Benfleet).
- Sidney John Pusey, Technician I, Kensington Telephone Exchange, General Post Office. (London W.14).
- Alfred George Raby, Non-Technical Class Grade III, Explosives Research and Development Establishment, Ministry of Aviation, Waltham Abbey.
- William Robert Ramsay, Mechanic Examiner, RN Aircraft Workshops, Admiralty, Perth. (Kelty).
- William Alfred Reeves, Substation Attendant, East Midlands Electricity Board. (Boston).
- Leonard Richmond, Ironworker, Royal Aircraft Establishment, Ministry of Aviation, Farnborough.
- Peter Robinson, Principal Instructor, HM Prison, Manchester.
- Frank Rodgers, Chief Medical Room Attendant, Treeton Colliery, National Coal Board. (Treeton).
- Bernard Corian Mitchell Rogers, Skilled Labourer (Leading Slinger), HM Dockyard, Devonport. (Plymouth).
- George Thomas Rowe, Chargeman, J. I. Thornycroft & Co. Ltd., Southampton.
- Frank Ryan, Chief Officer, Class II, HM Prison, Wakefield.
- James Screeton, Foreman Painter and Sealer, Amos & Smith Ltd., Hull.
- Harold Henry Sellwood, Building Supervisor, Reading Group of Hospitals.
- Joan Shacklock, Centre Organiser, Alfreton Urban District, Women's Voluntary Service.
- James Sighe, Shed Foreman, Manchester Ship Canal Company. (Salford).
- Adelaide Patricia Smith, Senior Chief Supervisor, Birmingham Telephone Exchange, General Post Office.
- Archibald Tulloch Smith, Donkeyman Greaser, SS Egidia, Anchor Line Ltd. (Glasgow).
- Percy Joshua Smith, District Fittings Foreman, Harlow, Eastern Gas Board. (Harlow).
- Hannah Smullian, Voluntary Welfare Worker, RAF Rehabilitation Unit, Headley Court. (London W.8).
- Gilbert Alexander Stewardson, Chargehand Jointer (E.H.T.), North Western Electricity Board. (Manchester).
- Alexander Strachan, lately Janitor, Girls' High School, Aberdeen.
- Amy Elizabeth Street, Senior Overlooker, Royal Ordnance Factory, Glascoed, Usk, Monmouthshire. (Blackwood).
- George Thomas Arthur Sturgis, Station Officer, Leicestershire and Rutland Fire Brigade. (Market Harborough).
- Charlotte Scarth Summerscales, Sub-Postmistress, St. Michaels T.S.O., Wakefield.
- James Belfridge Taylor, Turner Cammell Laird & Co. (Shipbuilders & Engineers) Ltd., Birkenhead.
- William Thorley, Foreman of Trades, Royal Air Force, Shawbury. (Market Drayton).
- John Jennett Tidd, lately Fatstock Officer, Ministry of Agriculture, Fisheries and Food. (Goring-by-Sea).
- George Trantham, General Foreman, AEI-Hotpoint Ltd. (Llandudno Junction).
- Jack Troth, Member, Civil Defence Corps, Coventry.
- Charles Harry Turner, Postman, Northern District Office, General Post Office. (London N.1).
- John Elliott Tweddell, Chargeman, A. Reyrolle & Co. Ltd. (Hebburn).
- Stanley Urch, Foreman Cooper, Colthurst & Harding Ltd. (Bristol).
- Walter Vinter, Inspector, Lincolnshire Special Constabulary. (Wigtoft).
- Thomas Wallace, Assistant Superintendent, Head Post Office, Liverpool. (Birkenhead).
- Charles Robert Weaver, lately Senior Artificer, Admiralty Experiment Works, Haslar. (Gosport).
- Violet Ann Wells, Collector, Crown Street Savings Group, Port Talbot, Glamorganshire.
- Dorothy Wescott, County Clothing Officer, Berkshire, Women's Voluntary Service. (Wokingham).
- Harold Walter Weston, Station Officer, Wiltshire Fire Brigade. (Calne).
- William John Whitby, Foreman, Rotax Ltd. (Greenford).
- Arthur Edward Stanley White, Head of Despatch Department, Sir Isaac Pitman & Sons Ltd., Bath.
- John Owen Williams, Hooker and Pump Attendant, Maenofferen Slate Mine. (Merioneth).
- James Wilson, Research and Experimental Mechanic (Welder) "A", Atomic Weapons Research Establishment, Aldermaston. (Basingstoke).
- Stanley Frank Wren, Assembly Shop Foreman, Aish & Company Ltd., Poole, Dorset. (Bournemouth).
- Thomas Wrigley, County Commandant, Buckinghamshire Special Constabulary. (Great Missenden).

State of New South Wales

- Robert Charles King, lately Bookbinder, Government Printing Department, New South Wales.
- Sidney Walter Pauley, Caretaker-Carpenter, Government House, Sydney.
- Aubrey Richard Shaw, lately Senior Inspector, Explosives Branch, Department of Mines, New South Wales.

Basutoland

- Vivian Mohai, Senior Nurse in Charge, Botsabelo Leper Settlement, Basutoland.

Overseas Territories

- Hasson Muhammad Warsama, Akil of Fish Sellers, Aden.
- Awang bin Dollah, Marine Assistant, Marine Department, Brunei.
- Randolph Atherley, Foreman of Works, Public Works Department, Dominica.
- Ralph James Edward Dalgairns, Foreman, Grade I, East African Railways and Harbours Administration.
- Owen Morsley Miller, Government Printer, Printing Department, Grenada.
- Lam Shiu Sheung, General Clerical Service, Class I, Hong Kong.
- Li Cheong, Hall Porter, Colonial Secretariat, Hong Kong.
- Arthur George Mcdermott, Chief Inspector, Licensing Authority, Traffic and Transport, Jamaica.
- Ibrahim Hassan, Senior Sergeant of Dubas (Tribal Police), Kenya.
- Dominic Simiana, Senior Foreman, Gas Board, Malta.
- Musa Imam, Imam, Royal West African Frontier Force, Federation of Nigeria.
- Adama Funtua Balaraba, Matron, Sokoto Native Authority Hospital, Northern Region, Nigeria.
- Mohammed Jiddah, Assistant Health Superintendent, Northern Region, Nigeria.
- Oko Willie, Chargeman, Ministry of Works and Transport, Western Region, Nigeria.
- Ng Ho Kong, Senior Charge Hand, Electricity Board, North Borneo.
- Sigoh bin Singkuman, Native Chief, Grade II, Pensiangan District, North Borneo.
- Bwanali Kaojole, DCM, Head Court Messenger, Mlanje District, Nyasaland.
- Samuel Gibson, Chief Officer, Royal Gaol, Saint Lucia.
- Peter Joseph, Head Teacher, Babonneau R.C. School, Saint Lucia.
- Abang Suhaili bin Abang Ali, Government Outboard Driver, Kapit, Sarawak.
- Paul John Samynadin, Clerk, Secretariat, Seychelles.
- Joshua Sylvanus Williams, lately Foreman of Works, Civil Engineering Branch of Railway, Sierra Leone.
- Jama Hersi Alaleh, Chief, Local Authority, Somaliland Protectorate.
- Nicolaos Vassiliou, Building Foreman to Ukerewe-Ukara Native Authorities, Tanganyika.
- John Barlow, Assistant Instructor, Nsamizi Training Centre, Uganda.

=== Royal Victorian Medal (RVM) ===
In Silver

- George Victor Charles Abbott.
- Edwin John Burkitt.
- Police Constable William Benjamin Burroughs, Metropolitan Police.
- Yeoman Bedgoer George Collins, DCM, Her Majesty's Bodyguard of the Yeomen of the Guard.
- Frank Herbert Augustus Doel.
- Walter Ernest East.
- James Robert Emmerson.
- John Charles Ghost.
- Ernest Page.
- Andre Rous.
- Francis Henry Turner.
- Albert George Wiles.

=== Royal Red Cross (RRC) ===
- Major Louisa Dodsley (206127), Queen Alexandra's Royal Army Nursing Corps.

==== Associate of the Royal Red Cross (ARRC) ====
- Dorothy Aileen Cooling, Superintending Sister, Queen Alexandra's Royal Naval Nursing Service (Retd.)
- Mary Josephine Miller, Superintending Sister, Queen Alexandra's Royal Naval Nursing Service.
- Major Kathleen Grimshaw (342217), Queen Alexandra's Royal Army Nursing Corps.
- Major Flora MacDonald (208788), Queen Alexandra's Royal Army Nursing Corps.
- Squadron Officer Isabella Robertson (405761), Princess Mary's Royal Air Force Nursing Service.
- Squadron Officer Ellen Nancy Stooks (405111), Princess Mary's Royal Air Force Nursing Service.

=== Air Force Cross (AFC) ===
Royal Navy

- Lieutenant-Commander Morris John Hedges.

Royal Air Force

- Squadron Leader Peter John Bardon, DFC, (607039).
- Squadron Leader Raymond John Davenport (199966).
- Squadron Leader Peter Anthony Latham (57736).
- Flight Lieutenant Edward Ross Gordon (4015072).
- Flight Lieutenant Jack Loat (41189).
- Flight Lieutenant Francis Daniel O'Brien (53468).
- Flight Lieutenant Eric Charles Peck (180342).
- Flight Lieutenant John Darrell Purcell (3041923).
- Flying Officer John Ross Ritchie (1571507).
- Master Pilot Lionel John Charles Wilcox, AFM, (1586369).
- Master Navigator Frank Walter Goodwin (1821306).

==== Bar to Air Force Cross ====
- Wing Commander Derek Shannon Vaughan Rake, OBE, AFC, (124494).

=== Air Force Medal (AFM) ===
- 3504551 Flight Sergeant Basil Breach.
- 1587199 Flight Sergeant Ronald Harry Albert Pinn.

==== Bar to Air Force Medal ====
- 636119 Acting Flight Sergeant Alfred Walter Card, AFM.

=== Queen's Commendation for Valuable Service in the Air ===
United Kingdom

- Captain Ronald Hartley, DFC, Senior Captain, First Class (Flight Operations), British Overseas Airways Corporation.
- Captain Wylie James Wakelin, DFC, Senior Captain, First Class, British European Airways Corporation.

Overseas Territory

- Captain Roman Hrycak, Air Pilot, Nigerian Airways.

Royal Navy

- Lieutenant-Commander John Stephen Humphreys.

Royal Air Force

- Wing Commander Basil Champneys, DFC, (116920).
- Squadron Leader Peter Edward Bairsto, AFC, (202703).
- Squadron Leader William John Laidler, (181250).
- Squadron Leader Leslie Edwin Hugh Scotchmer (152183).
- Squadron Leader John Lerwill Welland Towler (58600).
- Flight Lieutenant George Dunwoody Bain (161481).
- Flight Lieutenant Harold Baker, MBE, DFC, (45075).
- Flight Lieutenant Francis William Barker, DFC, (117441).
- Flight Lieutenant Robert Elliott Brown (181215).
- Flight Lieutenant Michel Jean-Claude Burton (4077039).
- Flight Lieutenant Basil Walter Dodd, AFC, (3507986).
- Flight Lieutenant William Snowdon Douglas (171007).
- Flight Lieutenant Patrick Bardon Hine (2494717).
- Flight Lieutenant Paul Julius Hirst (4076366).
- Flight Lieutenant Charles William Michael Lister (4088074).
- Flight Lieutenant William James McBurney (158763).
- Flight Lieutenant Alexander Hugh MacKenzie (1823783).
- Flight Lieutenant Ebenezer Milroy (198850).
- Flight Lieutenant Ronald Frederick Mudge (3514200).
- Flight Lieutenant Frederick John Myers (1623642).
- Flight Lieutenant Bernard James Noble (583275).
- Flight Lieutenant William Patrick Peedell, AFC, (161598).
- Flight Lieutenant Roger Ernest Pyrah (607302).
- Flight Lieutenant James Robertson Rhind (3509000).
- Flight Lieutenant John Severn (186065).
- Flight Lieutenant John James Taylor (184027).
- Flight Lieutenant Peter Ronald Woodham (4108266).
- Flying Officer Gilbert Harman (1602993).
- Flying Officer Richard Thomas Vane, AFM, (1809968).
- Master Engineer Arthur Halliday Elliot (1850082).
- 2713571 Acting Sergeant Derek Finlay James Holmes.

=== Queen's Police Medal (QPM) ===
England and Wales

- David Aitken, Chief Constable, Wigan Borough Police.
- John Stuart Hinton Gaskain, MBE, Chief Constable, Gloucestershire Constabulary.
- Gerald Frederick Payne, BEM, Commander, Metropolitan Police.
- Kenneth George Julian, Assistant Chief Constable, Cornwall Constabulary.
- Frederick Edward Shannon, Chief Superintendent, City of London Police.
- John Lawson Harper, Chief Superintendent, Metropolitan Police.
- James Marsh Rodgers, Superintendent and Deputy Chief Constable, Blackburn Borough Police.
- Leonard Arthur Unwin, Superintendent and Deputy Chief Constable, Cambridgeshire Constabulary.
- John William Dwyer, Superintendent, Cardiff City Police.
- Henry George Edmonds, Superintendent, Metropolitan Police.
- Harry May, Superintendent, Sheffield City Police.

Scotland

- David Gray, Chief Constable, Stirling and Clackmannan Constabulary.
- Robert Winter Rutherford, Superintendent, Lothians and Peebles Constabulary.

Northern Ireland

- Alexander McCord, Head Constable, Royal Ulster Constabulary.

Isle of Man

- Thomas Arthur Cringle, lately Chief Inspector, Isle of Man Constabulary.

State of New South Wales

- Sidney John Sellers, Superintendent 2nd Class, New South Wales Police Force.
- John Henry Aldridge, Superintendent 3rd Class, New South Wales Police Force.
- Sylvester George Bourke, Superintendent 3rd Class, New South Wales Police Force.
- Hector Arnold Crampton, Superintendent 3rd Class, New South Wales Police Force.
- John McMenamin Parmeter, Superintendent 3rd Class, New South Wales Police Force.
- Thomas Austin Schuback, Inspector 1st Class, New South Wales Police Force.

State of South Australia

- Gilbert Leonard Gully, Senior Inspector, South Australia Police Force.
- Geoffrey Malcolm Leane, MVO, Deputy Commissioner of Police, South Australia Police Force.

Southern Rhodesia

- Charles William Duncombe, MBE, Senior Assistant Commissioner, British South Africa Police.

Overseas Territories

- Ian Saxby Proud, Deputy Commissioner of Police, Federation of Nigeria.
- Edward Oliver Plunkett, Deputy Commissioner of Police, North Borneo.
- Roy James Randell, Senior Superintendent of Police, Northern Rhodesia.
- Alan Robert Lodge, Deputy Commissioner of Police, Nyasaland.
- Roland de Lacey Wheeler, Assistant Commissioner of Police, Sierra Leone.
- Stanley Marchmont Fortt, Senior Assistant Commissioner of Police, Uganda.

=== Queen's Fire Services Medal (QFSM) ===
England and Wales

- Cyril Outhwaite, Chief Officer, North Riding of Yorkshire Fire Brigade.
- William Bell Muir, OBE, Chief Officer, Northumberland Fire Brigade.
- Reginald Robert Lloyd, Chief Officer, Croydon Fire Brigade.
- Daniel Gerald Jones, Chief Officer, Carmarthenshire and Cardiganshire Joint Fire Brigade.

Scotland

- Alexander James Greenslade, Firemaster, Fife Fire Brigade.

=== Colonial Police Medal (CPM) ===
Southern Rhodesia

- Thomas Digby Allen, Superintendent, British South Africa Police.
- Dzimiri, Station Sergeant, British South Africa Police.
- Peter Stanley Gordon Hawke, Inspector, British South Africa Police.
- Robert Conway John, Chief Inspector, British South Africa Police.
- George Charles John Light, Superintendent, British South Africa Police.
- Magama, Detective 1st Sergeant, British South Africa Police.
- Mukiwa, Station Sergeant, British South Africa Police.
- Eric Desmond van Sittert, Superintendent, British South Africa Police.
- Arthur Vincent Weston, Superintendent, British South Africa Police.

Overseas Territories

- Lennard Allard, Assistant Superintendent, Trinidad Police Force.
- Timothy Omo Bare, Superintendent, Nigeria Police Force.
- Arthur Henry Bishop, Senior Superintendent, Nigeria Police Force.
- Watson Eustace Bowling, Chief Inspector, British Guiana Police Force.
- Chan Fook-Cheung, Sub-Inspector, Hong Kong Police Force.
- Chau Chun-Kau, Inspector, Hong Kong Auxiliary Police Force.
- Nazir Ahmed Dar, Superintendent, Tanganyika Police Force.
- Miguel Alberto Da Sousa, Superintendent, Hong Kong Auxiliary Police Force.
- Arthur John Docherty, Senior Superintendent, Uganda Police Force.
- Thomas Lillie Dow, Chief Inspector, Hong Kong Police Force.
- Ian Nigel Dundas, Senior Superintendent, Kenya Police Force.
- Edward Charles Ealey, Senior Superintendent, Lagos Special Constabulary, Nigeria Police Force.
- Lorenso Farquharson, Inspector, Jamaica Police Force.
- Joseph Maurice Ithier, Superintendent, Mauritius Police Force.
- Albert Spencer James, Detective Inspector, Jamaica Police Force.
- Munyambu s/o Kavindu, Sergeant, Kenya Police Force.
- Ibrahim Jaganda Kisau Khamisi, Head Constable, Uganda Police Force.
- Mohamed Yusuf Khan, Temporary Senior Inspector, Tanganyika Police Force.
- Desmond Murray McGusty, Deputy Superintendent, Fiji Police Force.
- Magina, Sergeant-Major, Tanganyika Police Force.
- Austin Kenneth Malcolm, Senior Superintendent, Uganda Police Force.
- Mkenyela Rashidi, Detective Sergeant, Tanganyika Police Force.
- John Stanford Morvvo, Inspector, Sierra Leone Police Force.
- Joel Ekemezie Okoli, Superintendent, Nigeria Police Force.
- David Ian Oliver, Chief Inspector, Northern Rhodesia Police Force.
- Emmanuel Olufemi Olufunwa, Superintendent, Nigeria Police Force.
- Jeremiah Obonyo Ongala, Assistant Inspector, Kenya Police Force.
- Pierpaulo Otto, Detective Head Constable, Uganda Police Force.
- Peter Granville Owen, Senior Superintendent, Somaliland Police Force.
- Searle John Barfield Page, Superintendent, Kenya Police Force.
- Herman Zenda Rohomoja, Detective Sergeant, Tanganyika Police Force.
- Arthur Henry Rose, Superintendent, Lagos Special Constabulary, Nigeria Police Force.
- Manohar Singh Sandhu, Assistant Superintendent, Uganda Police Force.
- Robert Carlisle Spooner, Chief Officer, Trinidad Volunteer Fire Service.
- Stephen Talabi, Sub-Inspector, Nigeria Police Force.
- Randolph Marcus Thomas, Assistant Superintendent, St. Vincent Police Force.
- Charles Olabode Turner, Chief Inspector, Nigeria Police Force.
- John Walker, Superintendent, Uganda Police Force.

== Australia ==
=== Knight Bachelor ===
- John William Ashton, OBE, Chairman of the Commonwealth Art Advisory Board.
- Arthur William Coles, of Toorak, Victoria. For public services.
- Cecil Harold Hoskins, Chairman of the Australian Mutual Provident Society.
- Francis Anthony Meere, CBE, Comptroller-General of Customs.
- Professor Robert Dickie Watt, University of Sydney; in recognition of his contribution to agricultural science in Australia.

=== Order of the Bath ===
==== Companion of the Order of the Bath (CB) ====
Military Division

- Lieutenant-General Hector Geoffrey Edgar, CBE, (3/24), Australian Staff Corps.

=== Order of Saint Michael and Saint George ===
==== Companion of the Order of St Michael and St George (CMG) ====
- Bertram Thomas Dickson, Chairman of the Council of Canberra University College.
- Alfred Francis Hill, OBE, Musical Composer and Conductor, of Mosman, New South Wales.
- Geoffrey Cochrane Remington, of Wollstonecraft, New South Wales. For public services.

=== Order of the British Empire ===
==== Dame Commander of the Order of the British Empire (DBE) ====
Civil Division

- Margery Merlyn Baillieu Myer, OBE, of Toorak, Victoria; in recognition of her charitable and social welfare work.

==== Knight Commander of the Order of the British Empire (KBE) ====
Military Division

- Vice-Admiral Henry Mackay Burrell, CB, CBE, Royal Australian Navy.

Civil Division

- Brigadier Kenneth Agnew Wills, CBE, MC, ED, Deputy-Director of Recruiting in South Australia; Member of the Australian Universities Commission.

==== Commander of the Order of the British Empire (CBE) ====
Military Division

- Rear-Admiral Kenneth McKenzie Urquhart, Royal Australian Navy.
- Colonel John George Glyn White, OBE, ED, MB, BS, (3/50056), Royal Australian Army Medical Corps.
- Acting Group Captain Reginald Max Rechner, DFC, Citizen Air Force.

Civil Division

- Eliel Edmund Irving Body, of the Bundemar Merino Stud, Trangie, New South Wales.
- Captain George Ian Dewart Hutcheson, Royal Australian Navy (Retired), of Edgecliff, New South Wales. For services to the engineering profession in Australia.
- Colonel Alfred Newcombe Kemsley, ED, of Brighton, Victoria; in recognition of his social welfare work on behalf of ex-servicemen and women.
- Guy William McIlroy, President, Graziers Federal Council of Australia.
- Henry McLorinan, MB, BS, FRACP, of Fairfield, Victoria; in recognition of his work in the field of preventive medicine.
- James Vincent Moroney, OBE, Secretary, Department of Primary Industry.
- Leonard Nettlefold, of Hobart, Tasmania. For public and philanthropic services.
- Group Captain John Peter Ryland, DFC, General Manager, Australian National Airlines Commission (Trans-Australia Airlines).
- Patrick Shaw, Her Majesty's Australian Ambassador Extraordinary and Plenipotentiary in Djakarta, Indonesia.

==== Officer of the Order of the British Empire (OBE) ====
Military Division

- Captain Stanley Darling, DSC, VRD, Royal Australian Naval Reserve.
- Colonel Alfred Eric Beck (3/95), Royal Australian Electrical and Mechanical Engineers.
- Lieutenant-Colonel (Honorary Colonel) Dawn Valerie Vautin Jackson (F2/131), Women's Royal Australian Army Corps.
- Lieutenant-Colonel Raymond Francis Manning O'Grady (2/191592), Royal Australian Artillery.
- Group Captain Keith Selwyn Hennock, DFC, Royal Australian Air Force.
- Wing Commander Joseph Edward Haigh (03457), Royal Australian Air Force.

Civil Division

- William Herbert Crowther, Manager, Western Division, Qantas Empire Airways Ltd.
- Alfred Noel Curphey, General Manager, Victorian Chamber of Manufactures, and a Member of the Export Development Council.
- Alexander John Stratton Day, MBE, Australian Government Trade Commissioner, New York.
- Andrew Fabinyi, of Toorak, Victoria. For services to Australian literature.
- James Cyril Harrison, Director, Posts and Telegraphs, Postmaster-General's Department, Victoria.
- Ralph Lindsay Harry, a senior officer of the Department of External Affairs, at present seconded to the Department of Defence.
- William Garnet James, of Potts Point, New South Wales; in recognition of his contribution to Australian culture.
- Alys Key, of Darebin, Victoria. For charitable and social welfare work.
- Arthur Leopold Gladstone McDonald, Librarian, Australian National University, 1948-1960.
- Kenneth Jock McKenzie, Secretary, Commonwealth Grants Commission.
- Ian Francis McLaren, National President for Australia of the Young Men’s Christian Association.
- Maurice Walter O'Donnell, First Assistant Secretary, General Financial and Economic Policy Branch, Department of the Treasury.
- Edmund Strathmore Playfair, of Woollahra, New South Wales. For public services.
- Harold Edward Renfree, Commonwealth Crown Solicitor.
- Roy Rowe, Director of the Associated Chambers of Commerce of Australia.
- Leslie Arthur Schumer, of East Malvern, Victoria. For public services.
- Thomas Williams, of Croydon, New South Wales. For public services.
- Annie Forsyth Wyatt (Mrs. Ivor Bertie Wyatt), Member of the Council, National Trust of Australia.

==== Member of the Order of the British Empire (MBE) ====
Military Division

Royal Australian Navy

- Lieutenant Ronald Mervyn Titcombe, Royal Australian Navy.

Australian Military Forces

- Major Hector Brain (3/172), Australian Staff Corps.
- 2/918 Warrant Officer Class II Charles Thomas Orbel Curtis, Royal Australian Artillery.
- 3/72657 Warrant Officer Class II Geoffrey Charles Gosney, Royal Australian Infantry Corps.
- 5/1328 Warrant Officer Class I Charles Percival James, Royal Australian Infantry Corps.
- 2/1222 Warrant Officer Class I Edward John Laker, Royal Australian Survey Corps.
- 1/39098 Warrant Officer Class I James Kenneth Murphy, Royal Australian Army Medical Corps.
- Captain (Quartermaster) Leonard Thomas Sykes (3/287), Royal Australian Army Service Corps.

Royal Australian Air Force

- Warrant Officer William James Joseph Banks (A3722).
- Warrant Officer William Brian Cavanagh (A31175).
- Warrant Officer John James Montgomery (A51598).
- Warrant Officer Francis Joseph Sheriff (A210396), Citizen Air Force.

Civil Division

- George Emslie Anderson, JP, of Adelaide, South Australia. For social welfare services.
- Madge Martha Anderson (Mrs. Kenneth McColl Anderson), of Eastwood, New South Wales. For services to the community.
- Leonard Frank Burton Barber, Secretary, Taxation Board of Review No. 3.
- Henry Orlando Bennett, Honorary Federal Secretary-Treasurer, Commonwealth Council, Limbless Soldiers' Association of Australia.
- Gladys Selby Buntine (Mrs. Martyn Arnold Buntine), of Geelong, Victoria. For services to Youth.
- John Henry Cask, formerly Supervisor of Investigations, Taxation Office, New South Wales.
- Leila Adelaide Chenery (Mrs. Frank Graham Chenery), Honorary Secretary of the Victoria League in Western Australia.
- Jeremiah Donovan, Administrative Officer, Antarctic Division, Department of External Affairs.
- Rupert Reginald Ellen, Australian Trade Commissioner at Montreal.
- Dorothea Dell Hayman, Honorary International Commissioner of the Girl Guides Association in Australia.
- Florence Eleanor Hibble, JP, of Hornsby, New South Wales. For social welfare services.
- Arthur Leo Holman, of Killara, New South Wales. For public services.
- Walter Annandale Jack, of Brighton, Victoria. For social welfare services, especially on behalf of young people.
- James James, Commonwealth Director of Works in New South Wales.
- Harold Ernest Kelly, Chief Aeronautical Inspector (Aircraft), Department of Air.
- William James Keith Mackay, JP, of West Ballarat, Victoria. For services to the community.
- Alderman Clarice Mavis McClymont, JP, Grafton City Council, New South Wales. For public services.
- James Ebenezer McTaggart, of Turramurra, New South Wales. For social welfare work on behalf of aged people.
- Henry William Martin, formerly Civil Assistant to the Director of Navy Medical Services, Department of the Navy.
- Patrick William Quinn, of Victoria Park, Western Australia. For social welfare services to disabled ex-servicemen.
- Patrick Joseph Sheehan, Command Secretary, Northern Command, Department of the Army.
- Captain John Slade, AFC, Senior Pilot of the Northern Territory Aerial Medical Service.
- Ethel Thorpe Southey, of Melbourne, Victoria. For services to the community.
- Clare Grant Stevenson, of Edgecliff, New South Wales. For social welfare services on behalf of ex-service women.
- Leslie Joseph Tinker, of Kogarah, New South Wales. For services to charitable and philanthropic organisations.
- Edwin Harold Tytherleigh, President, Australian Council of Co-operative Building and Housing Societies.
- Albert James Williams, of Albury, New South Wales. For services to country journalism.

=== Companion of the Imperial Service Order (ISO) ===
Australian Civil Service

- Wilfrid Thomas Haslam, formerly Commonwealth Director of Works in South Australia.
- John James Douglas Leathart, MBE, Deputy Commissioner of Repatriation, New South Wales.

=== British Empire Medal (BEM) ===
Military Division

Royal Australian Navy

- Chief Engine Room Artificer Thomas William James Cunningham, R.24901, Royal Australian Navy.

Australian Military Forces

- 2/45433 Warrant Officer Class I (temporary) (Bandmaster) William Stanley Coltman, Royal Australian Infantry Corps.
- 3/4691 Corporal Patrick Michael Kelly, Royal Australian Electrical and Mechanical Engineers.
- F.5/8 Sergeant Patricia Frances McNab, Royal Australian Army Nursing Corps.
- 2/46508 Staff-Sergeant Beaumont Frederick Mitchell, Royal Australian Engineers.
- 5/276 Sergeant David Henry Savage, Royal Australian Army Medical Corps.
- 1/3751 Corporal Noel Strohfeldt, Royal Australian Engineers.
- 5/10742 Staff-Sergeant Albert Edward Walker Wells, Royal Australian Artillery.
- 2/2738 Sergeant Errol Roy Wilson, Royal Australian Engineers.

Royal Australian Air Force

- A613 Flight Sergeant Kenneth Oswald Merton Lohrey.
- A32032 Sergeant James Denis McNamara.
- All 201 Corporal John Connolly.
- A31412 Corporal Cecil Joseph Twist.

Civil Division

- Nathaniel Willie Burke. For services to the Australian Postal Workers' Union.
- Mary Elizabeth Donnelly, Phonogram Monitor, Postmaster-General's Department, Tasmania.
- John Leonard McDonald, Senior Foreman, Overhaul Division, Australian National Airlines Commission.
- Robert Sidney Parker, Plumber, Department of Works.

=== Royal Red Cross (RRC) ===
- Wing Officer Charlotte Joan McRae, ARRC, (N.22229), Royal Australian Air Force Nursing Service.

==== Associate of the Royal Red Cross (ARRC) ====
- Major (temporary) Hazel Maryanne Lorking (F2/1051), Royal Australian Army Nursing Corps.
- Captain Hirell Mills (F4/2), Royal Australian Army Nursing Corps.

=== Air Force Cross (AFC) ===
- Squadron Leader Geoffrey Hume Kilby (033215).
- Flight Lieutenant Lyall Robert Klaffer (04218).
- Flight Lieutenant Thomas Lindsay McLeod (022074).

=== Queen's Commendation for Valuable Service in the Air ===
- Squadron Leader Raymond Alfred Scott (022143).
- Flight Lieutenant Ross Hamilton Allen (05890), (deceased).
- Flight Lieutenant John Bevan (022180).
- Flying Officer Michael Frederick Feiss (037392).

== Ghana ==
=== Knight Bachelor ===
- His Excellency Mr. Edward Otchere Asafu-Adjaye, Ghana High Commissioner in the United Kingdom.
- Charles William Tachie-Menson, CBE, Chairman, Public Service Commission.

=== Order of Saint Michael and Saint George ===
==== Companion of the Order of St Michael and St George (CMG) ====
- Hamish Millar-Craig, OBE, Permanent Secretary, Ministry of Finance.
- Mr. Justice William Bedford Van Lare, Justice of Appeal of the Supreme Court.
- Neville Warde Sabine, CBE, Auditor-General.

=== Order of the British Empire ===
==== Knight Commander of the Order of the British Empire (KBE) ====
Military Division

- Major-General Alexander George Victor Paley, CB, CBE, DSO, (23862), late Infantry (now retired). Lately General Officer Commanding, Ghana Army.

Civil Division

- Sir Kobina Arku Korsah, CBE, Chief Justice.

==== Commander of the Order of the British Empire (CBE) ====
Civil Division

- Daniel Ahmling Chapman, Headmaster, Achimota School.
- Evelyn Jane Alice Evans, MBE, Director of Library Services, Ghana Library Board.
- Kofi George Konuah, OBE, Member of the Public Service Commission.
- Erasmus Ransford Tawiah Madjitey, Commissioner of Police.

==== Officer of the Order of the British Empire (OBE) ====
Military Division

- Lieutenant-Colonel Eric Dolman (51323), The Loyal Regiment (North Lancashire) (Employed List 1); lately seconded to the Ghana Army (now R.A.R.O.).

Civil Division

- Arthur Ronald Elliott, Permanent Secretary, Ministry of Education and Information.
- Ernest William Claude French, Government Printer.
- Sophia Constance Jiagge, Principal Education Officer.
- Enoch Kwabena Okoh, Secretary to the Cabinet.
- Jessie Erica Powell, MBE, a Private Secretary in the Prime Minister's Office.
- Charles Morton Weatherburn, Administrative Officer, Class I.

==== Member of the Order of the British Empire (MBE) ====
Military Division

- Major Peter Eric Graham Carter (210882), Corps of Royal Engineers; lately seconded to the Ghana Army.
- 845992 Warrant Officer Class I Hubert Thomas Steggles, Royal Army Pay Corps; lately serving with the Ghana Army.

Civil Division

- Florence Wilson Addison, Senior Education Officer.
- William Francis Brennan, Director of National Lotteries.
- William Frank Coleman, Deputy Director of Broadcasting (Engineering).
- Ernest John Naldrett, Deputy Government Printer.
- Frances Christine Pringle, Private Secretary to the Governor-General.
- Dorothy Margaret Turnbull, formerly Principal, Offinso Women's Training College.

== Federation of Rhodesia and Nyasaland ==
=== Order of the British Empire ===
==== Commander of the Order of the British Empire (CBE) ====
Civil Division

- Robert Francis Halsted, OBE. For public and political services.
- Stanley Allan Rowe, lately Commissioner of Taxes.

==== Officer of the Order of the British Empire (OBE) ====
Civil Division

- James Scott Brown, General Manager of the Farmers' Co-operative Limited and the Rhodesian Farmers' Co-operative Industries Limited. For public services.
- Richard Edward Godfrey Hope. For public and political services.
- Captain Frank Bruce Robertson, MC, JP. For public services.

==== Member of the Order of the British Empire (MBE) ====
Civil Division

- John Harold Gordon Anderson. For services to Sport.
- Percy William Gibbs, lately Operating Superintendent, Rhodesia Railways Transportation Department.
- Ronald Philip Hartley. For services to Civil Aviation.
- Gerald Keogh, MC, lately Chief Inspector, Interim Federal Public Service Commission.
- Arthur Lindesay Thomson, Accountant, Office of the Federal High Commissioner in London.

=== British Empire Medal (BEM) ===
Military Division

- Warrant Officer Class II Chiwaya, 1st Battalion, The Rhodesian African Rifles.
- Warrant Officer Class II Jonas Limbani, 1st Battalion, The King's African Rifles.
- Regimental-Sergeant-Major John Mpopo, 2nd Battalion, The King's African Rifles.
- Sergeant Sebastiano Mwandusa, 2nd Battalion, The King's African Rifles.

Civil Division

- Abdulla Mahomed, lately Sub-Inspector, Nyasaland Police Force, seconded to the Federal Immigration Department.
