= 1983 in British television =

This is a list of British television-related events from 1983.

== Events ==
=== January ===
- 1 January – Channel 4 airs One in Five, a late-night profile of homosexual lifestyles. This programme and The Eleventh Hour: Veronica 4 Rose, featuring two schoolgirls discussing lesbianism, lead to extreme criticism for the channel and an attempt by Conservative MP John Carlisle to have the channel banned.
- 3 January – Children's ITV launches as a new branding for the late afternoon programming block on ITV, replacing Watch It!
- 6 January
  - The network television premiere of Richard Donner's 1978 blockbuster Superman: The Movie on ITV, starring Christopher Reeve, Margot Kidder, Gene Hackman and Marlon Brando.
  - Debut of The Irish R.M. on Channel 4.
- 14 January – TV-am broadcasts a special edition to advertisers ahead of its official launch on 1 February.
- 17 January – At 6:30am, Britain's first-ever breakfast television show, Breakfast Time, launches on BBC1.
- 29 January – Tom Keating On Painters is rebroadcast.
- 30 January – Channel 4 becomes the first broadcaster in the UK to show the Super Bowl live.
- 31 January – Channel 4 News introduces its current news theme "Best Endeavours" composed by Alan Hawkshaw.
- January
  - BBC1 starts broadcasting a full afternoon service, consisting of regional programmes, repeats and old feature films.
  - London Weekend Television drops in-vision continuity.

=== February ===
- 1 February – TV-am launches on ITV at 6am, with Daybreak and Good Morning Britain.
- 4 February – The US sitcom Cheers, starring Ted Danson and Shelley Long, makes its UK debut on Channel 4.
- 6 February – The Australian soap opera Sons and Daughters makes its UK debut when Central becomes the first ITV region to begin showing the programme. All other ITV regions soon follow suit.

7 February – BBC2's four-hour weekday transmitter shutdown resumes. It had been suspended for previous four months to assist riggers adjust aerials during the lead up to, and the launch of, Channel 4.

- 8 February – Minipops makes its debut on Channel 4. Though a ratings success, it is axed after only one series due to heavy media criticism.
- 14 February
  - Granada faces an industrial dispute in which Coronation Street and World in Action are wiped out across the network.
  - Roger Hargreaves' Little Miss TV series is first broadcast on BBC1. The Mr Men series is also broadcast on BBC1 for reruns; however, only 13 episodes are broadcast due to the first 13 Little Miss books released.
- 17 February – Woodland Animations introduces a new stop-motion animated series, Gran, on BBC1, following the success of Postman Pat, the same day as the final episode of the sitcom Tom, Dick and Harriet airs on ITV.
- 22 February – The US television series Knight Rider makes its debut on ITV with the feature-length pilot episode; the following episode is shown two nights later. However, scheduling of the show varies across ITV regions, with STV not broadcasting the hit series until 5 April.
- 23 February – After months of "will she or won't she?" drama, Deirdre Barlow (Anne Kirkbride) makes the choice to break up with Mike Baldwin (Johnny Briggs) and reunite with her estranged husband Ken (William Roache) on Coronation Street. The episode is one of the highest-rated in the soap's history.
- 28 February
  - TV-am cuts its Daybreak programme to 30 minutes, allowing Good Morning Britain to begin half an hour earlier. Original Daybreak presenters Robert Kee and Angela Rippon are both replaced, with Gavin Scot on weekdays and Lynda Barry on weekends.
  - BBC1 begins broadcasting a 30-minute Ceefax slot prior to the start of Breakfast Time. It is called Ceefax AM. It is first mentioned in Radio Times on 21 March.

=== March ===
- 10 March – Debut of the cult US comedy series Police Squad! on ITV, starring Leslie Nielsen.
- 18 March – Amid falling ratings and mounting pressure from investors, Peter Jay steps aside as TV-am's Chief Executive allowing Jonathan Aitken (a sitting Conservative MP at this time) to take on the role. Angela Rippon and Anna Ford come out publicly to support Jay, referring to events as "treachery", unaware he has already left.
- 23 March – The BBC regrets that because of an industrial dispute at the printers next week's editions of Radio Times are in short supply, but copies will be available in the South West, West, North East, parts of the South and North of England, but no S4C listings in the Wales edition.

=== April ===
- 1 April – Roland Rat makes his first appearance on TV-am. Created by David Claridge and launched by TV-am children's editor Anne Wood to entertain younger viewers during the Easter holidays, Roland is generally regarded as TV-am's saviour, being described as "the only rat to join a sinking ship".
- 2 and 9 April – Two issues of Radio Times fail to be published, due to industrial action.
- 5 April – Debut of First Tuesday on ITV, the subject matter is mainly social issues and current affairs stories from around the world, with programmes being shown on the first Tuesday of the month.
- 7 April – ITV airs an evening of programmes under the banner of ITV's Channel Four Showcase. It includes both current and upcoming Channel 4 programmes.
- 9 April – The US police action series T. J. Hooker makes its UK debut on ITV, starring William Shatner.
- 10 April – ITV begins showing the two-part 1982 US mini-series World War III, starring David Soul and Rock Hudson.
- 12 April – Timothy Aitken succeeds his cousin Jonathan as chief executive of TV-am, due to the IBA rules regarding MPs operating a television station.
- 15 April – BBC2 launches the long-running showbiz programme Entertainment USA, presented by Jonathan King.
- 19 April – Angela Rippon and Anna Ford are axed from TV-am. Subsequently, Ford encounters Jonathan Aitken at a party in Chelsea and, in a parting shot over the terms of her dismissal, throws her glass of wine in his face.
- 29 April – Michael Parkinson is appointed to TV-am's board of directors.
- April – No. 73 launches nationally as ITV's Saturday morning children's show. It had been launched the previous year as a regional programme by TVS.

=== May ===
- 1 May – Debut of Alfresco on ITV, starring Robbie Coltrane, Ben Elton (the principal writer), Stephen Fry, Hugh Laurie, Siobhan Redmond and Emma Thompson. It is named after the Italian word meaning "in the fresh air" because it is filmed entirely on location, unusual for a comedy sketch show of the time. It runs for two seasons.
- 2 May – From this day, Ceefax pages are broadcast during all daytime downtime although BBC2 continues to close down fully for four hours after Play School. Teletext transmissions also begin on Channel 4 at around this time. Shown on weekday afternoons, they consist of two magazines – 4-Tel on View and Oracle on View – and are shown in fifteen minute bursts which are repeated several times each day prior to the start of each day's transmissions.
- 4 May – Jack Scott retires from the Met Office and presents his final national forecast for BBC Weather after 14 years, then joining Thames News as its weatherman for five years.
- 5 May – Top of the Pops celebrates its 1000th edition. The programme is also broadcast on BBC Radio 1 to allow viewers to listen to the programme in stereo.
- 11 May – Peter Adamson makes his last appearance as Len Fairclough on Coronation Street.
- 17 May – Engineering Announcements is broadcast on ITV for the final time.
- 23 May – TV-am's new look begins as Daybreak is axed, with Good Morning Britain extending to start at 6:25am. Commander David Philpott is moved to present the weather at the weekends only, with Wincey Willis becoming the new weekday weather presenter.
- 24 May – Engineering Announcements is shown on Channel 4 and S4C for the first time. The channel transfer sees the bulletin broadcast twice, with a lunchtime repeat beginning on this day. The programme continues to be shown on Tuesdays.
- 30 May – The morning broadcast of Play School moves to the earlier time of 10.30am.

=== June ===
- 9–10 June – BBC1 and ITV broadcast coverage of the 1983 General Election.
- 10 June – Channel 4 screens Alan Clarke's controversial 1979 film version of his borstal set drama Scum, starring Ray Winstone. The showing attracts criticism and so-called video nasties moral crusader Mary Whitehouse privately prosecutes Channel 4 for the screening of the film.
- 15 June – The first episode of The Black Adder starring Rowan Atkinson, the first in the successful Blackadder series of sitcoms, is broadcast on BBC1, also featuring Tony Robinson, Tim McInnerny and Brian Blessed.
- 24 June
  - BBC Schools programmes under the title For Schools, Colleges are broadcast for the final time on BBC1 ahead of its move to BBC2 in the Autumn.
  - Bob Monkhouse presents his last episode of Family Fortunes on ITV.
- 25 June – The network television premiere of the 1979 Dracula film on ITV, starring Frank Langella and Laurence Olivier.
- 27 June – The shareholders of Satellite Television agree a £5 million offer to give News International 65% of the company.

=== July ===
- 6 July – Screened on BBC2, Maggie Wadey's powerful drama The Waiting War dramatises the conflict of the Falklands War via the experiences of three navy wives in Portsmouth whose husbands were aboard HMS Sheffield.
- 10 July – ITV screens Alan Clarke's controversial drama Made in Britain, starring Tim Roth as a young skinhead.
- 16 July – Debut of The Mad Death on BBC1. The three-part series examines the effects of an outbreak of rabies in the United Kingdom and is noted for its occasionally chilling content.
- 21 July – The last edition of Junior Pot Black on BBC2 in which John Parrott wins his second title. Among the players for this series was 14 year old Stephen Hendry who was making his TV debut and would lose in the semi-finals. It would be another eight years before the series would make a return.
- 22 July – The hit US action-adventure series The A-Team makes its UK debut on ITV, with the feature-length pilot. The full series commences a week later on 29 July. Starring Mr. T as B. A. Baracus, George Peppard as "Hannibal" Smith, Dirk Benedict as Templeton Peck (played by Tim Dunigan in the pilot) and Dwight Schultz as "Howling Mad" Murdock.

=== August ===
- 5 August – After 14 years on the air, the final edition of Nationwide is broadcast on BBC1.
- 16 August – ITV broadcasts a police procedure drama called Woodentop as part of its Storyboard series. It would later be turned into a series and renamed The Bill, commencing on 16 October 1984 and lasting until 31 August 2010.
- 26 August – The Big Match becomes a nationally networked programme, as ITV move away from regional highlights. However, after the second weekend of the season highlights coverage is knocked off the air til February by an industrial dispute involving videotape editors.
- 27–28 August – BBC2 Rocks Around the Clock for the first time by broadcasting non-stop music programmes all day and also all night.
- 29 August – The game show Blockbusters is launched on ITV, presented by Bob Holness and features sixth-form students as contestants.

=== September ===
- 3 September – BBC1 begins showing the US comedy detective series Remington Steele, starring future 007 Pierce Brosnan. Although the series would run for five seasons in the US, the BBC broadcasts only the first.
- 5 September
  - Filmation's fantasy adventure cartoon series He-Man and the Masters of the Universe makes its world premiere on Children's ITV.
  - ITV launches the espionage drama Reilly, Ace of Spies, starring Sam Neill.
  - BBC1 screen part one of a four-part presentation of Mario Puzo's The Godfather. Shown over consecutive nights, this is a specially re-edited version of both Godfather films, incorporating previously unseen material and presented in chronological order from 1901 to 1959. Directed by Francis Ford Coppola and starring Marlon Brando, Al Pacino and Robert De Niro.
- 6 September – ITV broadcasts Killer. It would later be turned into a series and renamed Taggart.
- 9 September – London Weekend Television launches a computerised version of its ident with the tagline "Your Weekend ITV".
- 11 September – ITV begins showing the epic World War II miniseries The Winds of War, starring Ali MacGraw, Jan-Michael Vincent and Robert Mitchum.
- 12 September – The children's animated series Henry's Cat, created by veteran animators Stan Hayward and Bob Godfrey, makes its debut on BBC1.
- 13 September – BBC-1 begins showing 'The Dark Side of the Sun', a six-part supernatural drama serial set on Rhodes, Greece, concerning a secret brotherhood of international financiers and politicians based around the 14th century Order of Knights Templars. Written by Michael J. Bird who also penned 'The Lotus Eaters', 'Who Pays the Ferryman?' and 'The Aphrodite Incident'.
- 16 September – BBC2 closes down during the day for the final time. All future daytime downtime is filled by Pages from Ceefax.
- 19 September – Daytime on Two launches on BBC2. Broadcasting during term time from just after 9am until 3.00pm, the strand brings together the BBC Schools programming previously shown on BBC1 and the BBC's adult educational programmes which are shown at lunchtime during the autumn and spring terms. A special version of its 'Computer Generated 2' is launched to introduce the programmes, as is a special sequence of Ceefax pages called the Daytime on Two information Service which is broadcast during the longer gaps between programmes.
- September – Central finally launches its East Midlands service. An industrial dispute had prevented them from launching it when it first went on air at the start of 1982.

=== October ===
- October – Ceefax In Vision is seen through the morning and into the afternoon on BBC2 at the weekend on a regular basis for the first time during the Open University's off-season. It continues to be shown on weekend mornings until the Open University reopens at the start of February.
- 2 October – ITV shows a live top flight football match for the first time since 1960. This marks the start of English football being shown on a national basis rather than on a regional basis, resulting in The Big Match becoming a fully national programme.
- 3 October – Bananaman makes its debut on BBC1, based on the Nutty comic strip with the voices of Tim Brooke-Taylor, Graeme Garden and Bill Oddie (aka The Goodies).
- 4 October
  - Debut of the Welsh children's animated series SuperTed on BBC1 which is based on a series of stories written by Welsh writer, producer and animator Mike Young to help his son overcome his fear of the dark. The series becomes so popular it is spawned into merchandising and is broadcast in many countries worldwide.
  - The Adventures of Portland Bill, a stop-motion animated series from FilmFair London, makes its debut on ITV.
- 9 October
  - Gerry Anderson and Christopher Burr's science-fiction puppet series Terrahawks makes its debut on ITV. The show is Anderson's first in over a decade to use puppets for its characters, making use of latex Muppet-style hand puppets to animate the characters in a process Anderson dubs "Supermacromation".
  - Channel 4 broadcasts Tony Harrison's The Oresteia, an adaptation of classical Greek myths.
- 12 October – Doris Speed makes her last appearance as Annie Walker on Coronation Street.
- 14 October – Max Bygraves becomes the new host of Family Fortunes on ITV.
- 16 October – Satellite Television officially begins broadcasting in the UK. The channel had launched the previous year on cable in various European countries but to view the channel in the UK a satellite dish approximately 10 feet (3 metres) wide is required due to the channel being broadcast via the Orbital Test Satellite.
- 24 October – Sixty Minutes launches on BBC1, replacing Nationwide but ends less than a year later.
- 25 October – BBC1 starts airing the seventh season of the US drama series Dallas.
- 28 October – The BBC had planned to show a live league football match for the first time but this broadcast is cancelled due to industrial action that takes Match Of The Day off the air for several weeks. As a replacement, BBC1 shows Carry On Girls.

=== November ===
- 3 November – The network television premiere of the 1978 sci-fi film, Battlestar Galactica The Movie on ITV (except Central, who had finally began showing the series on 28th August). Unbilled as such, this is the extended television version of the film, rather than the theatrical release version.
- 6 November – The final edition of Sale of the Century is broadcast on ITV after 12 years on the air.
- 11 November – Dick Clement and Ian La Frenais' hugely popular comedy-drama Auf Wiedersehen, Pet makes its debut on ITV.
- 17 November – Debut of the film Those Glory Glory Days on Channel 4, part of the First Love series.
- 18 November – The famous "turkey" episode of Family Fortunes is broadcast on ITV in which one contestant (Bob Johnson), while playing the Big Money round, offers the answer to the first three questions, scoring zero for the first two and 21 points for the third. Earlier in the episode, both families struggled to name a famous Irishman.
- 20 November – ITV begins showing the BAFTA- and Golden Globe-winning three-part miniseries Kennedy, starring Martin Sheen as US President John F. Kennedy.
- 25 November – BBC1 airs a special feature-length episode of Doctor Who to celebrate the 20th anniversary of its first broadcast with "The Five Doctors", featuring all the previous Doctors alongside Peter Davison's current Time Lord. In the US, Chicago PBS station WTTW showed the programme on 23 November.
- 26 November – ITV shows the 1979 time travel film Time After Time, starring Malcolm McDowell and David Warner.
- 29 November – BBC1 airs An Englishman Abroad, based on the true story of a chance meeting of actress Coral Browne (who stars as herself) with Guy Burgess (Alan Bates), a member of the Cambridge spy ring who spied for the Soviet Union while an officer at MI6. The production has been written by Alan Bennett and directed by John Schlesinger.
- 30 November – Debut of the Jim Davidson sitcom Up the Elephant and Round the Castle on ITV.
- November – An episode of ITV's animated series Danger Mouse has viewing figures reaching 21.59 million, an all-time high for a British children's programme.
- November – Britain's first pirate television station, Telstar TV, broadcasts for the first time. The channel broadcasts on the BBC2 transmitter in the Northfield and Rubery areas of Birmingham, showing a mixture of films and music videos. It airs at the weekend, after Friday's closedown, between 1am and 5am. It broadcasts unnoticed by the authorities for several weeks.

=== December ===
- 3 December
  - Radio Times misses an issue due to a print workers dispute; this will be the last issue missed for at least 40 years.
  - The music video for Michael Jackson's Thriller, directed by John Landis, is shown on Channel 4 at 1:05am. Premiering the same evening as MTV's showing in America, it is introduced by The Tube host Jools Holland.
- 5 December – Following the end of the Daytime on Two term, Ceefax is shown non-stop throughout the day on BBC2 for the first time with transmissions running continuously from around 9am until the start of programmes at 5:35pm.
- 10 December – ITV airs The Day After, about a fictional war between the NATO forces and the Warsaw Pact countries that rapidly escalates into a full-scale nuclear exchange between the United States and the Soviet Union which were due to start World War III.
- 16 December
  - BBC televises a live Football League game for the first time, as they broadcast Manchester United's 4–2 win over Tottenham Hotspur.
  - Channel 4 shows the 1979 Werner Herzog film Nosferatu the Vampyre, starring Klaus Kinski and Isabelle Adjani.
- 21 December – The network television premiere of The Fog, John Carpenter's 1980 horror film, on BBC1.
- 24 December – The network television premiere of the cult 1980 Flash Gordon movie on BBC1, starring Sam J. Jones, Melody Anderson, Topol, Max von Sydow, Timothy Dalton and Brian Blessed.
- 25 December
  - BBC1 shows the classic 1950 Disney adventure film for the first time on terrestrial television, Treasure Island.
  - ITV shows the blockbuster film Superman The Movie for a second time.
  - Channel 4 shows the network premiere of the 1982 Martin Scorsese crime thriller The King of Comedy, starring Robert De Niro and Jerry Lewis. Channel 4 also airs Skywhales, an animated short film by Derek Hayes and Phil Austin that depicts a fictional society of alien creatures dwelling in the atmosphere of a gas giant, noted for the completeness of its depiction of a fictitious society including social structures and practices.
  - Terry Wogan presents his final edition of Blankety Blank on BBC1.
- 26 December – The network television premiere of John G. Avildsen's 1976 boxing drama film Rocky on BBC1, starring Sylvester Stallone, Talia Shire, Burt Young, Burgess Meredith and Carl Weathers.
- 27 December
  - The children's stop-motion animated TV film version of The Wind in the Willows by Kenneth Grahame is shown on ITV, featuring the voices of David Jason as Toad, Richard Pearson as Mole, Ian Carmichael as Rat and Michael Hordern as Badger.
  - The UK network television premiere of Oh, God! on BBC2, Carl Reiner's comedy about an unassuming supermarket manager chosen by God to spread his message and starring George Burns and John Denver.
- 28 December – ITV screens the UK terrestrial premiere of the 1976 horror film Carrie based on the novel by Stephen King and starring Sissy Spacek.
- 29 December – Channel 4 broadcasts Raymond Briggs' animated television film The Snowman for the second time, with a new introduction by legendary pop superstar David Bowie.
- 30 December – ITV regions (except Central) screen Mission Galactica: The Cylon Attack, the 1979 feature length made for TV sequel to Battlestar Galactica.

== Debuts ==
=== BBC1 ===
- 5 January – Captain Zep – Space Detective (1983–1984)
- 12 January – Skorpion (1983)
- 16 January – Dombey and Son (1983)
- 17 January – Breakfast Time (1983–1989)
- 20 January
  - The Climber (1983)
  - The Citadel (1983)
- 14 February – Little Miss (along with Mr. Men reruns) (BBC1 1983–1987, BBC2 1988)
- 17 February – Gran (1983)
- 23 February – The Machine Gunners (1983)
- 8 March – Baker Street Boys (1983)
- 23 March – To the Lighthouse (1983)
- 29 March – Tears Before Bedtime (1983)
- 7 April – Jury (1983)
- 13 May – Thief (1983)
- 3 June – Jack of Diamonds (1983)
- 5 June – The Hot Shoe Show (1983–1984)
- 15 June – Blackadder (1983–1989)
- 16 July – The Mad Death (1983)
- 3 September – Remington Steele (1982–1987)
- 12 September – Henry's Cat (1983–1993)
- 13 September – The Dark Side of the Sun (1983)
- 22 September
  - Give Us a Break (1983–1984)
  - Just Good Friends (1983–1986)
  - Breadwinners (1983–1986)
- 3 October – Bananaman (1983–1986)
- 4 October – SuperTed (1983–1986)
- 5 October – Seaview (1983–1985)
- 9 October – Jane Eyre (1983)
- 16 October
  - By the Sword Divided (1983–1985)
  - Sweet Sixteen (1983)
- 24 October – Sixty Minutes (1983–1984)
- 25 October – Don't Wait Up (1983–1990)
- 7 November – So You Want to be Top? (1983–1985)
- 9 November – Spyship (1983)
- 10 November – Johnny Jarvis (1983)
- 16 November – The Winner (1983)
- 29 November – An Englishman Abroad (1983)
- 13 December
  - The Aerodrome (1983)
  - No Place Like Home (1983–1987)
- 26 December – The Tale of Beatrix Potter (1982)
- 30 December – Waters of the Moon (1983)

=== BBC2 ===
- 10 January – Making the Most of the Micro (1983)
- 11 January – Look and Read: Fairground (1983)
- 19 January – The Cleopatras (1983)
- 7 March – My Cousin Rachel (1983)
- 10 March – Tucker's Luck (1983–1985)
- 15 March – Dear Ladies (1983–1985)
- 13 April – Shackleton (1983)
- 15 May – Entertainment USA (1983–1989)
- 18 May – Pinkerton's Progress (1983)
- 7 July – The Crystal Cube (1983)
- 3 August – Grey Granite (1983)
- 7 September – The Gathering Seed (1983)
- 15 September – The Old Men at the Zoo (1983)
- 2 October – Micro Live (1983–1987)
- 24 October – The Bob Monkhouse Show (1983–1986)
- 28 October – Good Behaviour (1983)
- 29 October – The Beggar's Opera (1983)
- 6 November – Mansfield Park (1983)
- 16 December – Heartattack Hotel (1983)
- 19 December – A Talent for Murder (1983)

=== ITV ===
- 3 January – Children's ITV (Afternoon block 1983–2007, Morning block 1983–present)
- 4 January – Bloomfield (1983)
- 5 January – Unknown Chaplin (1983)
- 6 January – The Coral Island (1983)
- 9 January – The Forgotten Story (1983)
- 10 January
  - Alphabet Zoo (1983–1984)
  - Mike Yarwood in Persons (1983–1984)
- 16 January – Live from Her Majesty's (1983–1988)
- 22 January – Luna (1983–1984)
- 24 January – The Moomins (1983–1985)
- 25 January – The Hard Word (1983)
- 1 February
  - Daybreak (1983)
  - Good Morning Britain (1983–1992)
- 2 February – The Home Front (1983)
- 6 February – Sons and Daughters (1982–1987)
- 11 February – Pictures (1983)
- 13 February – Number 10 (1983)
- 17 February – Knight Rider (1982–1986)
- 20 February – The Boy Who Won the Pools (1983)
- 21 February – Brass (1983–1990)
- 10 March – Police Squad! (1982)
- 13 March – Cuffy (1983)
- 16 March – Widows (1983–1985)
- 22 March – Studio (1983)
- 5 April – First Tuesday (1983–1993)
- 8 April
  - Death of an Expert Witness (1983)
  - Make Me Laugh (1983)
- 9 April – T. J. Hooker (1982–1986)
- 12 April – Goodnight and God Bless (1983)
- 16 April – Philip Marlowe, Private Eye (1983–1986)
- 18 April – Spooky (1983)
- 29 April – Hallelujah! (1983–1984)
- 1 May – Alfresco (1983–1984)
- 9 May – Jamaica Inn (1983)
- 17 May – No Excuses (1983)
- 27 May – Shades of Darkness (1983,1986)
- 8 June – Jemima Shore Investigates (1983)
- 19 June – Birth of a Nation (1983)
- 20 June – The Happy Apple (1983)
- 26 June – Flying into the Wind (1983)
- 3 July – Rhino (1983)
- 5 July – Moschops (1983)
- 10 July
  - Made in Britain (1983)
  - A Married Man (1983)
- 18 July – Victor & Maria (1983–1985)
- 22 July – The A-Team (1983–1987)
- 24 July – Now and Then (1983–1984)
- 25 July – Miracles Take Longer (1983–1984)
- 26 July – Storyboard (1983–1989)
- 29 July – The Cabbage Patch (1983)
- 14 August – The Balance of Nature (1983)
- 23 August – Affairs of the Heart (1983–1985)
- 29 August – Blockbusters (1983–93, 1994–95, 1997, 2000–01, 2012, 2019)
- 31 August – Charlie Muffin (1979)
- 5 September
  - Doris (1983–1985)
  - He-Man and the Masters of the Universe (1983–1985)
  - Reilly, Ace of Spies (1983)
- 6 September – Taggart (1983–2011)
- 9 September – A Brother's Tale (1983)
- 11 September – The Winds of War (1983)
- 12 September – Dramarama (1983–1989)
- 14 September – The All Electric Amusement Arcade (1983)
- 30 September – The Outsider (1983)
- 3 October
  - Orm and Cheep (1983–1985)
  - Terrahawks (1983–1986)
- 4 October – The Adventures of Portland Bill (1983–1986)
- 9 October – The Secret Adversary (1983)
- 13 October – Kolchak: The Night Stalker (1974–1975)
- 16 October – Agatha Christie's Partners in Crime (1983–1984)
- 23 October – Highway (1983–1993)
- 11 November – Auf Wiedersehen, Pet (1983–1986, 2002–2004)
- 14 November – The Witches and the Grinnygog (1983)
- 20 November – Kennedy (1983)
- 23 November – Chessgame (1983)
- 27 November – Struggle (1983–1986)
- 29 November – Saigon: Year of the Cat (1983)
- 30 November – Up the Elephant and Round the Castle (1983–1985)
- 10 December – The Day After (1983)
- 27 December – The Wind in the Willows (1983–1987; 1990)

=== Channel 4 ===
- 6 January – The Irish R.M. (1983–1985)
- 7 January – No Problem! (1983–1985)
- 8 January – The Lady Is a Tramp (1983–1984)
- 9 January – Story of the Alps: My Annette (1983)
- 4 February – Cheers (1982–1993)
- 8 February – Minipops (1983)
- 17 April – Father's Day (1983–1984)
- 18 April – St. Elsewhere (1982–1988)
- 16 June – Red Monarch (1983)
- 2 July – Nana (1981)
- 7 August – One Summer (1983)
- 6 October – The Nation's Health (1983)
- 4 November – Who Dares Wins (1983–1988)
- 17 November – Those Glory Glory Days (1983)
- 24 November – The Country Girls (1983)
- 25 December – Skywhales (1983)

== Television shows ==
=== Changes of network affiliation ===
Shows	Moved from	Moved to
Des O'Connor Tonight	BBC1	ITV
BBC Schools and Colleges programmes	BBC1	BBC2
Tell the Truth	ITV	Channel 4
WKRP in Cincinnati	ITV	Channel 4

== Continuing television shows ==
=== 1920s ===
- BBC Wimbledon (1927–1939, 1946–2019, 2021–present)

=== 1930s ===
- Trooping the Colour (1937–1939, 1946–2019, 2023–present)
- The Boat Race (1938–1939, 1946–2019, 2021–present)
- BBC Cricket (1939, 1946–1999, 2020–2024)

=== 1940s ===
- Come Dancing (1949–1998)

=== 1950s ===
- Panorama (1953–present)
- Crackerjack (1955–1984, 2020–present)
- What the Papers Say (1956–2008)
- The Sky at Night (1957–present)
- Blue Peter (1958–present)
- Grandstand (1958–2007)

=== 1960s ===
- Coronation Street (1960–present)
- Songs of Praise (1961–present)
- Doctor Who (1963–1989, 1996, 2005–present)
- World in Action (1963–1998)
- Top of the Pops (1964–2006)
- Match of the Day (1964–present)
- Crossroads (1964–1988, 2001–2003)
- Play School (1964–1988)
- Mr. and Mrs. (1965–1999)
- World of Sport (1965–1985)
- Jackanory (1965–1996, 2006)
- Sportsnight (1965–1997)
- Call My Bluff (1965–2005)
- The Money Programme (1966–2010)
- Reksio (1967–1990)
- The Big Match (1968–2002)
- Screen Test (1969–1984)

=== 1970s ===
- The Old Grey Whistle Test (1971–1987)
- The Two Ronnies (1971–1987, 1991, 1996, 2005)
- Crown Court (1972–1984)
- Are You Being Served? (1972–1985)
- Pebble Mill at One (1972–1986, 1991–1996)
- Weekend World (1972–1988)
- Rainbow (1972–1992, 1994–1997)
- Emmerdale (1972–present)
- Newsround (1972–present)
- We Are the Champions (1973–1987)
- Last of the Summer Wine (1973–2010)
- That's Life! (1973–1994)
- Wish You Were Here...? (1974–2003)
- Arena (1975–present)
- Jim'll Fix It (1975–1994)
- Gambit (1975–1985, 1995)
- Rentaghost (1976–1984)
- One Man and His Dog (1976–present)
- The Krypton Factor (1977–1995)
- 3-2-1 (1978–1988)
- Grange Hill (1978–2008)
- Ski Sunday (1978–present)
- Terry and June (1979–1987)
- The Book Tower (1979–1989)
- Blankety Blank (1979–1990, 1997–2002)
- The Paul Daniels Magic Show (1979–1994)
- Antiques Roadshow (1979–present)
- Question Time (1979–present)

=== 1980s ===
- The Gentle Touch (1980–1984)
- Juliet Bravo (1980–1985)
- Cockleshell Bay (1980–1986)
- Play Your Cards Right (1980–1987, 1994–1999, 2002–2003)
- Family Fortunes (1980–2002, 2006–2015, 2020–present)
- Children in Need (1980–present)
- A Fine Romance (1981–1984)
- Punchlines (1981–1984)
- Finders Keepers (1981–1985)
- Freetime (1981–1985)
- Game for a Laugh (1981–1985)
- Tenko (1981–1985)
- That's My Boy (1981–1986)
- Razzamatazz (1981–1987)
- Bergerac (1981–1991)
- The Saturday Show (1982–1984)
- The Young Ones (1982–1984)
- Odd One Out (1982–1985)
- On Safari (1982–1985)
- Only Fools and Horses (1981–2003)
- 'Allo 'Allo! (1982–1992)
- Wogan (1982–1992)
- Saturday Superstore (1982–1987)
- The Tube (1982–1987)
- Brookside (1982–2003)
- Let's Pretend (1982–1988)
- No. 73 (1982–1988)
- Timewatch (1982–present)
- Countdown (1982–present)
- Right to Reply (1982–2001)

== Ending this year ==
- 6 February – The Professionals (1977–1983)
- 17 February – Tom, Dick and Harriet (1982–83)
- 8 March – Animal Magic (1962–1983)
- 15 March – Minipops (1983)
- 21 April – ITV Playhouse (1967–1983)
- 12 May – Gran (1983)
- 5 July – The Gaffer (1981–1983)
- 6 July – Triangle (1981–1983)
- 21 July – Andy Robson (1982–1983)
- 5 August – Nationwide (1969–1983)
- 19 October – Butterflies (1978–1983, 2000)
- 28 October – The Bounder (1982–1983)
- 30 December
  - The Good Old Days (1953–1983)
  - Story of the Alps: My Annette (1983)
  - Take Hart (1977–1983)

== Births ==
- 31 January – James Sutton, actor (Hollyoaks)
- 5 February – Gemma McCluskie, actress (d. 2012),
- 14 March – Johnny Flynn, actor
- 15 March – Sean Biggerstaff, actor
- 21 March – Bruno Langley, actor
- 23 March – Ellie Price, television journalist
- 22 April – Elliott Jordan, actor
- 5 May – Lucy-Jo Hudson, actress
- 13 May – Natalie Cassidy, actress
- 30 May – Jennifer Ellison, actress
- 31 May – Reggie Yates, actor and television and radio presenter
- 6 June
  - Gemma Bissix, actress
  - Ella Smith, actress
- 30 June – Cheryl Cole, singer
- 19 July – Brooke Kinsella, actress and writer
- 20 July – Rory Jennings, actor
- 5 August – Kara Tointon, actress
- 7 August – Tina O'Brien, actress
- 21 August – Chantelle Houghton, reality TV star
- 24 August – Christopher Parker, actor
- 28 October – Joe Thomas, actor
- 17 November – Harry Lloyd, actor

== Deaths ==
Date	Name	Age	Cinematic Credibility
2 January	Dick Emery	67	comedian and actor
2 January	Olive Mercer	78	actress (Dad's Army)
10 January	Ewan Roberts	68	actor
27 February	Ruth Dunning	73	actress
5 March	Rex Jameson	58	comedian
27 March	James Hayter	75	actor
30 March	Tony Sympson	76	actor
31 March	Stephen Murray	70	actor
1 April	John R. Buckmaster	67	actor
17 April	Thomas L. Thomas	72	television singer (The Voice of Firestone)
22 May	John Barrett	73	actor
6 June	Ambrose Coghill	79	actor (The Stalls of Barchester, Six Days of Justice)
17 June	George Benson	72	actor (The Forsyte Saga)
18 June	Derek Godfrey	59	actor (Danger Man)
22 June	Daphne Heard	78	actress (To the Manor Born)
21 July	Norman Chappell	57	actor
29 July	David Niven	73	actor
1 August	Peter Arne	58	actor
10 October	Ralph Richardson	80	actor
20 October	Peter Dudley	48	actor (Coronation Street)
15 November	John Le Mesurier	71	actor (Dad's Army)
4 December	Maurice Browning	64	actor
22 December	Charles Lloyd-Pack	81	actor
24 December	Alan Melville	73	television screenwriter and actor
26 December	Violet Carson	85	actress (Coronation Street)
29 December	Janet Webb	53	actress (Morecambe and Wise, The Two Ronnies)

== See also ==
- 1983 in British music
- 1983 in British radio
- 1983 in the United Kingdom
- List of British films of 1983
