= 1985 in British radio =

This is a list of events in British radio during 1985.

== Events ==
=== January ===
- 7 January – Ken Bruce takes over The Radio 2 Breakfast Show from Terry Wogan and David Jacobs moves from the Sunday morning host of Melodies for You to start a new weekday lunchtime programme consisting mainly of tracks from musical theatre called My Kind of Music.

=== February ===
- 4 February – After broadcasting off and on since 1969, Radio Jackie's time as a pirate station ends. It returns 18 years later as a legal station, broadcasting to the same area of south west London that it had served as a pirate.

=== March ===
- 31 March – Ranking Miss P becomes BBC Radio 1's first regular black female DJ when she begins presenting the station's first reggae programme, Culture Rock. This is not her first appearance on the station, however, as she has been sitting in for other presenters for the past year.

=== April ===
- 24 April – Financial difficulties force South Wales station Gwent Broadcasting to close down after less than two years on air. Its frequencies are later given over to a sustaining service provided by neighbouring station CBC in Cardiff, with which it was trying to merge.

=== May ===
- No events.

=== June ===
- 29 June – Study on 4 is renamed Options and from this date all of BBC Radio's adult educational programming is now broadcast on weekend afternoons. The programmes continue to be broadcast only on VHF/FM. This means that Radio 4's output on weeknights between 11 pm and 11.30 pm – i.e. all of The World Tonight and The Financial World Tonight – are now also broadcast on VHF/FM.

=== July ===
- 13 July – BBC Radio 1 broadcasts full, live coverage of the Live Aid pop concerts. The entire event is broadcast on VHF/FM via an extended 'borrow' of BBC Radio 2's VHF/FM frequencies. This means that the concert can be heard in stereo.

=== August ===
- During the 1985 school summer holidays, BBC Radio 4 broadcasts an all-morning children's programme called Pirate Radio 4 on Thursday mornings. Three editions of the programme are aired. It is broadcast on VHF/FM only, with the usual Radio 4 schedule continuing on long wave.

=== September ===
- 3 September – The first changes to VHF/FM frequencies for ILR and BBC local radio take place with Pennine Radio in Huddersfield moving from 103.4 to 102.5 VHF. It is part of a European re-organisation of band 2 of the VHF band which comes into effect in July 1987 to allow the full broadcasting spectrum to be available for broadcasting.
- 4 September – The Droitwich Transmitting Station is switched off for the day to carry out essential maintenance work, meaning that BBC Radio 1 is not available in the Midlands until the 22.00 nightly borrow of Radio 2’s VHF/FM frequencies, and Radio 4 is not available on long wave in the whole England and Wales. The decision is taken not to transmit the Shipping Forecasts on VHF/FM which means that national shipping forecasts are not broadcast by the BBC on this day.
- 9 September – Following Wiltshire Radio's purchase of Radio West, Radio West closes at just after midnight.
- 28 September – A Little Night Music is broadcast on BBC Radio 2 for the first time. Airing daily between 3 am and 4 am, it replaces repeats of programmes previous broadcast on Radio 2. Instead of having a regular or named host, the programme is presented by that night's newsreader.

=== October ===
- 1 October
  - BBC Radio nan Gàidheal launches, replacing the Gaelic service BBC Radio nan Eilean which covered north west Scotland and the Gaelic programming on BBC Radio Highland.
  - Radio Hallam's broadcast area is expanded when the Sheffield-based station starts broadcasting across all of South Yorkshire.
  - Following its purchase of Radio West, new owners Wiltshire Radio merge Radio West and Wiltshire Radio and launch a new 24-hour station, GWR FM with split programming for the two areas at breakfast and mid-morning.
- 14 October – At 6am, CBC is relaunched as Red Dragon Radio and broadcasts a 24-hour schedule (CBC had previously closed down between 1am and 6am). The station also covers the Newport area, offering a replacement service to Gwent Broadcasting, including opt-outs for Newport.
- Undated in October
  - Plymouth Sound launches an opt-out service for Tavistock. The service operates on weekday breakfast and drive time and weekend mid-mornings.
  - Kiss makes its first broadcasts as a pirate station.

=== November ===
- 15 November – Radio Mercury's transmission area expands when it switches on a transmitter covering the Horsham area.

=== December ===
- 29 December – BBC Radio 4 begins a 6-part dramatisation of Agatha Christie's novel The Mystery of the Blue Train, the first of a series of Hercule Poirot radio adaptations.

=== Unknown ===
- The Independent Broadcasting Authority announces that Portsmouth station Radio Victory has lost its licence to a new consortium called Ocean Sound Ltd, which will broadcast to an enlarged area which also includes Southampton, Winchester and the Isle of Wight. This is the first time that the Authority has decided not to renew the licence of an incumbent broadcaster.
- Due to general difficulties within the commercial radio industry, Hereward Radio withdraws from Northamptonshire and the Independent Broadcasting Authority assigns the Independent Local Radio franchise to a new company, Northants Radio Ltd, owned by Chiltern Radio Group.
- BBC Radio 1's London studios move to Egton House.

== Station debuts ==
- 23 April – BBC Radio Shropshire
- 24 June – BBC Radio Bedfordshire
- 1 October –
  - BBC Radio nan Gàidheal
  - GWR

== Changes of station frequency ==
Station	Area	Moved from	Moved to
BBC Radio Sussex	East Sussex	103.1FM	104.5FM
BBC Radio Sussex	Reigate and Crawley	102.7FM	104.0FM
Essex Radio	Chelmsford	96.4FM	102.6FM
Essex Radio	Southend	95.3FM	96.3FM
Invicta Sound	Ashford	96.3	96.4
Invicta Sound	Canterbury	95.1FM	102.8FM
Invicta Sound	Maidstone & Medway	103.6FM	103.1FM
Pennine Radio	Huddersfield & Halifax	103.4FM	102.5FM
Radio Mercury	Reigate and Crawley	103.6	102.7
Saxon Radio	Bury St Edmunds	96.3FM	96.4FM

== Programme debuts ==
- 2 February – Blandings on BBC Radio 4 (1985–1992)
- 25 March – King Street Junior on BBC Radio 4 (1985–1998)
- 12 April – Instant Sunshine on BBC Radio 4 (1985–1988)
- 17 April – After Henry on BBC Radio 4 (1985–1989)
- 25 July – Pirate Radio Four on BBC Radio 4 (1985–1986)

== Continuing radio programmes ==
=== 1940s ===
- Sunday Half Hour (1940–2018)
- Desert Island Discs (1942–Present)
- Down Your Way (1946–1992)
- Letter from America (1946–2004)
- Woman's Hour (1946–Present)
- A Book at Bedtime (1949–Present)

=== 1950s ===
- The Archers (1950–Present)
- The Today Programme (1957–Present)
- Sing Something Simple (1959–2001)
- Your Hundred Best Tunes (1959–2007)

=== 1960s ===
- Farming Today (1960–Present)
- In Touch (1961–Present)
- The World at One (1965–Present)
- The Official Chart (1967–Present)
- Just a Minute (1967–Present)
- The Living World (1968–Present)
- The Organist Entertains (1969–2018)

=== 1970s ===
- PM (1970–Present)
- Start the Week (1970–Present)
- Week Ending (1970–1998)
- You and Yours (1970–Present)
- I'm Sorry I Haven't a Clue (1972–Present)
- Good Morning Scotland (1973–Present)
- Kaleidoscope (1973–1998)
- Newsbeat (1973–Present)
- The News Huddlines (1975–2001)
- File on 4 (1977–Present)
- Money Box (1977–Present)
- The News Quiz (1977–Present)
- Breakaway (1979–1998)
- Feedback (1979–Present)
- The Food Programme (1979–Present)
- Science in Action (1979–Present)

=== 1980s ===
- Radio Active (1980–1987)
- In Business (1983–Present)
- Sounds of the 60s (1983–Present)
- Delve Special (1984–1987)

== Closing this year ==
- 13 February – Gwent Broadcasting (1983–1985)
- 9 September – Radio West (1981–1985)
- September – Wiltshire Radio (1982–1985)

== Births ==
- 5 February – Emma Barnett, broadcast presenter and journalist
- 22 February – Toddla T (Thomas Bell), DJ
- 19 March – Gemma Cairney, radio presenter and fashion stylist
- 16 August – DJ Q (Shollen Quarshie), DJ
- 17 December – Greg James, DJ
- 27 December – Matt Edmondson, broadcast music presenter

== Deaths ==
- 27 February – Ray Ellington, 68, jazz bandleader
- 9 May – Reginald Dixon, 80, theatre organist
- 28 May – Roy Plomley, 71, creator and presenter of Desert Island Discs
- 24 June – Valentine Dyall, 77, character actor
- 6 November – Hans Keller, 66, musicologist
- 23 November – Leslie Mitchell, 80, announcer
- 30 December – Bob Pearson, 78, singer and pianist (part of Bob and Alf Pearson double act)

== See also ==
- 1985 in British music
- 1985 in British television
- 1985 in the United Kingdom
- List of British films of 1985
