= Mel Knight (radio presenter) =

British radio presenter

Mel Knight is a Welsh radio presenter, who presents popular Red Dragon FM radio show 'The Full Welsh Breakfast', together with her partner Jason 'Jase' Harrold.

== Biography ==
Mel has worked on Red Dragon's breakfast show since October 2005 with Jase Harrold.

Before joining Red Dragon, Mel worked as a holiday rep and in sales.

It is known that she is fond of drama, drinking and rugby, in which she has played as a flanker for a women's team.

She is recently married to Matthew with whom she lives in Cardiff.
