= 1983 in British music =

This is a summary of 1983 in music in the United Kingdom, including the official charts from that year.

== Events ==
- 8 January – The UK singles chart is tabulated from this week forward by The Gallup Organization and the BMRB manual diary method was ended. Electronic dataport machines were used in selected stores and Gallup would automatically dial up the terminals via telephone lines to gather the sales information.
- 10 February – John McCabe's Concerto for Orchestra is given its first performance by the London Philharmonic Orchestra, conducted by Sir Georg Solti.
- 14 May – The Symphony No 2 Summer Music by William Mathias is performed for the first time by the Liverpool Philharmonic Society
- 30 May – Elton John releases his album Too Low for Zero, marking the beginning of his mid-1980s comeback after several albums disappointed in sales.
- 31 May – Nigel Osborne's Sinfonia No 2 is performed for the first time by the Leicestershire Schools Symphony Orchestra.
- 3 June – The opera Raleigh's Dream by Iain Hamilton is performed for the first time in Durham, North Carolina
- 17 July – The Cello Concerto by Lennox Berkeley, composed in 1939, is performed for the first time in Manchester.
- 27 July – The Piano Concerto by Dominic Muldowney is performed for the first time in London.
- 20 August – The Rolling Stones sign a new $28 million contract with CBS Records, the largest recording contract in history up to this time.
- 1 September – Joe Strummer and Paul Simonon of The Clash issue a press statement announcing that Mick Jones has been fired from the group.
- 20 September – The first ARMS Charity Concert is held at the Royal Albert Hall in London.
- 3 October – The first performance of the opera Marching Song by Benjamin Frankel, left in short score at the time of the composer's death ten years earlier, is broadcast by the BBC.
- 8 November – the first performance of Benjamin Britten's An American Overture (composed in 1941) by the City of Birmingham Symphony Orchestra conducted by Simon Rattle.
- 9 November – The Blue Guitar for solo guitar by Michael Tippett is performed for the first time, at the Ambassador Auditorium, Pasadena, California.
- 28 November – The first Now album is released.
- 15 December – The broadcast premiere of Elisabeth Lutyens’ Music for Orchestra 1V is given by the City of London Sinfonia, conducted by Richard Hickox.

== Charts ==
=== Number one singles ===
Chart date (week ending)	Song	Artist(s)	Weeks	Sales
1 January	"Save Your Love"	Renée and Renato	2	
8 January	"Save Your Love"	Renée and Renato	2	111,826
15 January	"You Can't Hurry Love"	Phil Collins	2	84,286
22 January	"You Can't Hurry Love"	Phil Collins	2	124,865
29 January	"Down Under"	Men at Work	3	128,078
5 February	"Down Under"	Men at Work	3	110,466
12 February	"Down Under"	Men at Work	3	79,152
19 February	"Too Shy"	Kajagoogoo	2	76,738
26 February	"Too Shy"	Kajagoogoo	2	78,472
5 March	"Billie Jean"	Michael Jackson	1	97,580
12 March	"Total Eclipse of the Heart"	Bonnie Tyler	2	121,159
19 March	"Total Eclipse of the Heart"	Bonnie Tyler	2	134,249
26 March	"Is There Something I Should Know?"	Duran Duran	2	108,137
2 April	"Is There Something I Should Know?"	Duran Duran	2	132,889
9 April	"Let's Dance"	David Bowie	3	110,789
16 April	"Let's Dance"	David Bowie	3	100,521
23 April	"Let's Dance"	David Bowie	3	86,717
30 April	"True"	Spandau Ballet	4	95,268
7 May	"True"	Spandau Ballet	4	149,022
14 May	"True"	Spandau Ballet	4	107,440
21 May	"True"	Spandau Ballet	4	80,988
28 May	"Candy Girl"	New Edition	1	65,025
4 June	"Every Breath You Take"	The Police	4	81,736
11 June	"Every Breath You Take"	The Police	4	88,536
18 June	"Every Breath You Take"	The Police	4	74,885
25 June	"Every Breath You Take"	The Police	4	56,423
2 July	"Baby Jane"	Rod Stewart	3	68,000
9 July	"Baby Jane"	Rod Stewart	3	75,497
16 July	"Baby Jane"	Rod Stewart	3	56,848
23 July	"Wherever I Lay My Hat (That's My Home)"	Paul Young	3	58,973
30 July	"Wherever I Lay My Hat (That's My Home)"	Paul Young	3	74,817
6 August	"Wherever I Lay My Hat (That's My Home)"	Paul Young	3	62,764
13 August	"Give It Up"	KC and the Sunshine Band	3	56,525
20 August	"Give It Up"	KC and the Sunshine Band	3	88,944
27 August	"Give It Up"	KC and the Sunshine Band	3	77,622
3 September	"Red Red Wine"	UB40	3	71,536
10 September	"Red Red Wine"	UB40	3	129,438
17 September	"Red Red Wine"	UB40	3	144,347
24 September	"Karma Chameleon"	Culture Club	6	168,164
1 October	"Karma Chameleon"	Culture Club	6	239,598
8 October	"Karma Chameleon"	Culture Club	6	199,648
15 October	"Karma Chameleon"	Culture Club	6	143,378
22 October	"Karma Chameleon"	Culture Club	6	119,187
29 October	"Karma Chameleon"	Culture Club	6	90,950
5 November	"Uptown Girl"	Billy Joel	5	109,446
12 November	"Uptown Girl"	Billy Joel	5	147,254
19 November	"Uptown Girl"	Billy Joel	5	127,993
26 November	"Uptown Girl"	Billy Joel	5	86,088
3 December	"Uptown Girl"	Billy Joel	5	67,592
10 December	"Only You"	The Flying Pickets	4	96,934
17 December	"Only You"	The Flying Pickets	4	119,493
24 December	"Only You"	The Flying Pickets	4	122,587
31 December	"Only You"	The Flying Pickets	4	

=== Number one albums ===
Chart date (week ending)	Album	Artist(s)	Weeks
1 January	The John Lennon Collection	John Lennon	2
8 January	The John Lennon Collection	John Lennon	2
15 January	Raiders of the Pop Charts	Various Artists	2
22 January	Raiders of the Pop Charts	Various Artists	2
29 January	Business as Usual	Men at Work	5
5 February	Business as Usual	Men at Work	5
12 February	Business as Usual	Men at Work	5
19 February	Business as Usual	Men at Work	5
26 February	Business as Usual	Men at Work	5
5 March	Thriller	Michael Jackson	1
12 March	War	U2	1
19 March	Thriller	Michael Jackson	1
26 March	The Hurting	Tears for Fears	1
2 April	The Final Cut	Pink Floyd	2
9 April	The Final Cut	Pink Floyd	2
16 April	Faster Than the Speed of Night	Bonnie Tyler	1
23 April	Let's Dance	David Bowie	3
30 April	Let's Dance	David Bowie	3
7 May	Let's Dance	David Bowie	3
14 May	True	Spandau Ballet	1
21 May	Thriller	Michael Jackson	5
28 May	Thriller	Michael Jackson	5
4 June	Thriller	Michael Jackson	5
11 June	Thriller	Michael Jackson	5
18 June	Thriller	Michael Jackson	5
25 June	Synchronicity	The Police	2
2 July	Synchronicity	The Police	2
9 July	Fantastic	Wham!	2
16 July	Fantastic	Wham!	2
23 July	You and Me Both	Yazoo	2
30 July	You and Me Both	Yazoo	2
6 August	The Very Best of the Beach Boys	The Beach Boys	2
13 August	The Very Best of the Beach Boys	The Beach Boys	2
20 August	18 Greatest Hits	Michael Jackson and the Jackson 5	3
27 August	18 Greatest Hits	Michael Jackson and the Jackson 5	3
3 September	18 Greatest Hits	Michael Jackson and the Jackson 5	3
10 September	The Very Best of the Beach Boys	The Beach Boys	1
17 September	No Parlez	Paul Young	1
24 September	Labour of Love	UB40	1
1 October	No Parlez	Paul Young	2
8 October	No Parlez	Paul Young	2
15 October	Genesis	Genesis	1
22 October	Colour by Numbers	Culture Club	3
29 October	Colour by Numbers	Culture Club	3
5 November	Colour by Numbers	Culture Club	3
12 November	Can't Slow Down	Lionel Richie	1
19 November	Colour by Numbers	Culture Club	2
26 November	Colour by Numbers	Culture Club	2
3 December	Seven and the Ragged Tiger	Duran Duran	1
10 December	No Parlez	Paul Young	1
17 December	Now 1	Various Artists	3
24 December	Now 1	Various Artists	3
31 December	Now 1	Various Artists	3

== Year-end charts ==
Note: The year-end charts published in Music Week on 7 January 1984 only covered the period 4 January to 17 December 1983 – the BPI Year Book 1984 included the complete charts to the end of 1983.

=== Best-selling singles ===
No.	Title	Artist	Peak position
1	"Karma Chameleon"	Culture Club	1
2	"Uptown Girl"	Billy Joel	1
3	"Red Red Wine"	UB40	1
4	"Let's Dance"	David Bowie	1
5	"Total Eclipse of the Heart"	Bonnie Tyler	1
6	"True"	Spandau Ballet	1
7	"Down Under"	Men at Work	1
8	"Billie Jean"	Michael Jackson	1
9	"Only You"	The Flying Pickets	1
10	"All Night Long (All Night)"	Lionel Richie	2
11	"Sweet Dreams (Are Made of This)"	Eurythmics	2
12	"You Can't Hurry Love"	Phil Collins	1
13	"Too Shy"	Kajagoogoo	1
14	"Wherever I Lay My Hat (That's My Home)"	Paul Young	1
15	"Love of the Common People"	Paul Young	2
16	"Every Breath You Take"	The Police	1
17	"Is There Something I Should Know?"	Duran Duran	1
18	"Blue Monday"	New Order	9
19	"Give It Up"	KC and the Sunshine Band	1
20	"I.O.U."	Freeez	2
21	"Baby Jane"	Rod Stewart	1
22	"Say Say Say"	Paul McCartney and Michael Jackson	2
23	"They Don't Know"	Tracey Ullman	2
24	"Tonight I Celebrate My Love"	Peabo Bryson and Roberta Flack	2
25	"Words"	F.R. David	2
26	"Bad Boys"	Wham!	2
27	"Flashdance... What a Feeling"	Irene Cara	2
28	"New Song"	Howard Jones	3
29	"Moonlight Shadow"	Mike Oldfield	4
30	"My Oh My"	Slade	2
31	"Sign of the Times"	The Belle Stars	3
32	"Hold Me Now"	Thompson Twins	4
33	"Candy Girl"	New Edition	1
34	"Temptation"	Heaven 17	2
35	"Cry Just a Little Bit"	Shakin' Stevens	3
36	"Church of the Poison Mind"	Culture Club	2
37	"Electric Avenue"	Eddy Grant	2
38	"Mama"	Genesis	4
39	"Beat It"	Michael Jackson	3
40	"Double Dutch"	Malcolm McLaren	3
41	"Africa"	Toto	3
42	"Club Tropicana"	Wham!	4
43	"(Keep Feeling) Fascination"	The Human League	2
44	"Gold"	Spandau Ballet	2
45	"Modern Love"	David Bowie	2
46	"Let's Stay Together"	Tina Turner	6
47	"Come Back and Stay"	Paul Young	4
48	"Victims"	Culture Club	3
49	"I'm Still Standing"	Elton John	4
50	"(Hey You) The Rock Steady Crew"	The Rock Steady Crew	6

=== Best-selling albums ===
No.	Title	Artist	Peak position
1	Thriller	Michael Jackson	1
2	No Parlez	Paul Young	1
3	Colour by Numbers	Culture Club	1
4	Let's Dance	David Bowie	1
5	Fantastic	Wham!	1
6	True	Spandau Ballet	1
7	Now That's What I Call Music	Various Artists	1
8	Stages	Elaine Paige	2
9	Genesis	Genesis	1
10	Can't Slow Down	Lionel Richie	1
11	Synchronicity	The Police	1
12	Labour of Love	UB40	1
13	Business as Usual	Men at Work	1
14	18 Greatest Hits	Michael Jackson and The Jackson 5	1
15	Sweet Dreams (Are Made of This)	Eurythmics	3
16	Too Low for Zero	Elton John	7
17	The Luxury Gap	Heaven 17	4
18	Snap!	The Jam	2
19	The Hurting	Tears for Fears	1
20	Rio	Duran Duran	3 (Note: Reached number 2 in 1982)
21	The Very Best of the Beach Boys	The Beach Boys	1
22	In Your Eyes	George Benson	3
23	The Crossing	Big Country	3
24	Seven and the Ragged Tiger	Duran Duran	1
25	An Innocent Man	Billy Joel	4 (Note: Reached number 2 in 1984)
26	War	U2	1
27	Introducing Richard Clayderman	Richard Clayderman	2
28	Chas 'n' Dave's Knees Up: Jamboree Bag No. 2	Chas & Dave	7
29	Hello, I Must Be Going!	Phil Collins	3 (Note: Reached number 2 in 1982)
30	The John Lennon Collection	John Lennon	1
31	Faster Than the Speed of Night	Bonnie Tyler	1
32	Quick Step and Side Kick	Thompson Twins	2
33	Pipes of Peace	Paul McCartney	4
34	Under a Blood Red Sky	U2	2
35	The Final Cut	Pink Floyd	1
36	Touch	Eurythmics	8 (Note: Reached number 1 in 1984)
37	You and Me Both	Yazoo	1
38	Voice of the Heart	Carpenters	6
39	Toto IV	Toto	4
40	Crises	Mike Oldfield	6
41	Raiders of the Pop Charts	Various Artists	1
42	Formula 30	Various Artists	6
43	Body Wishes	Rod Stewart	5
44	Chart Hits '83	Various Artists	6
45	Twice as Kool: The Hits of Kool & the Gang	Kool & the Gang	4
46	Heartbreaker	Dionne Warwick	4 (Note: Reached number 3 in 1982)
47	The Essential Jean Michel Jarre	Jean Michel Jarre	14
48	Lionel Richie	Lionel Richie	9
49	The Two of Us	Various Artists	3
50	Kissing to Be Clever	Culture Club	10 (Note: Reached number 5 in 1982)

== Classical music ==
=== New works ===
- David Bedford
  - Five Diversions, for two flutes
  - The Valley Sleeper, the Children, the Snakes and the Giant, for orchestra
- Richard Rodney Bennett
  - Concerto for Wind Quintet
  - Guitar Sonata
  - Letters to Lindbergh, for female voices and piano duet
  - Memento, for flute and string orchestra
  - Seachange, for unaccompanied chorus
- Michael Berkeley
  - Cello Concerto
  - Or Shall We Die, oratorio
- Harrison Birtwistle
  - Deowa, for soprano and clarinet
  - Duets for Storab, for two flute
- David Blake – Rise, Dove, for baritone and orchestra
- Edward Cowie
  - Ancient Voices, for four voices
  - Missa Brevis
  - String Quartet No. 3, Creative Arts Quartet
  - String Quartet No. 4, Australia II
- Gordon Crosse – Wave Songs, for cello and piano
- Peter Maxwell Davies
  - Birthday Music for John, trio for flute, viola and cello
  - Into the Labyrinth, cantata
  - Sinfonietta Accademica, for chamber orchestra
- Brian Ferneyhough – Adagissimo, for string quartet
- Michael Finnissy
  - Australian Sea Shanties, for voices, recorders and piano
  - Ouraa, for ensemble (1982–83)
  - Soda Fountain, for voices and cymbals
  - Vaudeville, for mezzo, baritone and ensemble
- Alun Hoddinott – Quodlibet on Welsh Nursery Tunes – arr. for brass quintet
- Robin Holloway
  - Second Idyll for small orchestra
  - Serenade in E flat, for wind quintet and string quintet
- Elizabeth Maconchy
  - L'Horloge, for soprano, clarinet and piano
  - Tribute, for violin and woodwinds
- William Mathias
  - Alleluja! Christ is Risen!, anthem
  - Angelus, for women's voices
  - Horn Concerto
  - Let us Now Praise Famous Men, for chorus and orchestra
  - Missa Brevis
  - Organ Concerto
  - Symphony No. 2, Op.90 (Summer Music)
  - Tantum Ergo, for choir and organ
  - Violin Sonata No. 2
- Dominic Muldowney
  - The Duration of Exile, for mezzo and ensemble
  - Piano Concerto
  - A Second Show, for contralto and ensemble
- Paul Patterson – Mass of the Sea, for soli, chorus and orchestra
- John Pickard – Nocturne in Black and Gold
- Priaulx Rainier – Grand Duo for cello and piano
- John Tavener
  - He Hath Entered the Heven, for unaccompanied trebles
  - To a Child Dancing in the Wind, for soprano, flute, harp and viola
- Michael Tippett
  - Festal Brass with Blues, for brass ensemble
  - The Mask of Time (1980–83) for soli, chorus and orchestra

=== Opera ===
- Oliver Knussen – Where the Wild Things Are

== Musical films ==
- Monty Python's The Meaning of Life
- The Pirates of Penzance, starring Kevin Kline and Angela Lansbury

== Births ==
- 18 January – Antony Brant, singer (V)
- 3 March – Katie White, singer (The Ting Tings)
- 8 May – Matt Willis, singer and musician (Busted)
- 16 May – Mince Fratelli, musician (The Fratellis)
- 23 May – Heidi Range, singer (Sugababes)
- 17 June – Lee Ryan, singer (Blue)
- 30 June
  - Cheryl Cole, singer (Girls Aloud)
  - Anton Gordon, singer (One True Voice)
  - Patrick Wolf, singer-songwriter
- 7 July – Aaron Buckingham, singer (V)
- 22 July – Jodi Albert, singer (Girl Thing)
- 18 August – Mika, singer
- 25 August – James Righton, musician (The Klaxons)
- 11 September – Matthew Halsall, jazz trumpeter and promoter
- 13 September – James Bourne, singer and musician (Busted), (Son of Dork)
- 14 September – Amy Winehouse, singer-songwriter
- 25 September – Hayden Powell, jazz trumpeter and composer
- 24 October – V V Brown, English singer-songwriter, model, and producer
- 26 October – Ant Scott-Lee, singer (3SL)
- 8 November – Mark Harle, singer (V)

== Deaths ==
- 5 January – Amy Evans, operatic soprano, 98
- 6 January – Bernard Stevens, composer, 66
- 7 January – Edith Coates, operatic mezzo-soprano, 74
- 18 January – Cedric Thorpe Davie, composer, 69
- 28 January – Billy Fury, singer-songwriter, 42 (heart attack)
- 22 February – Sir Adrian Boult, conductor, 93
- 23 February – Herbert Howells, composer, 90
- 6 March – Howard McFarlane, jazz trumpeter, 89
- 8 March – Sir William Walton, composer, 80
- 23 March – David Wynne, composer, 82
- 14 April
  - Pete Farndon, bassist of the rock group the Pretenders, 30 (drug overdose)
  - Elisabeth Lutyens, composer, 76
- 17 April – Thomas L. Thomas, operatic baritone, 72
- 20 April – Sarah Makem, Northern Irish singer, 82
- 6 May – Pat Smythe, jazz pianist, 60
- 5 June – Anthony Lewis, musicologist, conductor and composer, 68
- 12 June – Ceinwen Rowlands, operatic soprano, 78
- 2 July – Jacqueline Townshend, violinist and pianist, 71
- 12 July – Chris Wood, founding member of Traffic, 39 (pneumonia)
- 16 July – David Ward, operatic bass, 61
- 31 August – Eve Taylor, music manager, 68
- 11 September – Brian Lawrance, bandleader, 74
- 19 September – Peter Mooney, conductor, 68
- 24 September
  - Isobel Baillie, operatic soprano, 88
  - John Bee, theatre organist, 87
- 19 November – Tom Evans, bassist of the rock group Badfinger, 36 (suicide)
- 7 December – Norah Blaney, pianist, composer and music hall performer, 90
- 8 December – Monica Harrison, operatic soprano, 86

== Music awards ==
=== Brit Awards ===
The 1983 Brit Awards winners were:

- Best British producer: Trevor Horn
- Best classical recording: John Williams – Portrait
- Best international artist: Kid Creole and the Coconuts
- Best live act: U2
- Best selling album: Barbra Streisand – Love Songs (also released as Memories in the U.S.)
- British breakthrough act: Yazoo
- British female solo artist: Kim Wilde
- British group: Dire Straits
- British male solo artist: Paul McCartney
- British single: Dexys Midnight Runners – "Come On Eileen"
- Life achievement award: Pete Townshend
- Outstanding contribution: The Beatles
- Special Award: Chris Wright
- The Sony award for technical excellence: Paul McCartney

== See also ==
- 1983 in British radio
- 1983 in British television
- 1983 in the United Kingdom
- List of British films of 1983
