= 1985 in British television =

This is a list of British television related events from 1985.

== Events ==
=== January ===
- 1 January
  - BBC1's New Year's Eve special Live into 85, broadcast from Gleneagles Hotel in Scotland, ends broadcasting in England, Wales and Northern Ireland as scheduled 40 minutes earlier than in Scotland after a series of disasters brought on by poor organisation from the production team.
  - New Year's Day highlights on BBC1 include the World War II film The Guns of Navarone and the Alan Ayckbourn play Absurd Person Singular.
  - Channel 4 airs It Was Twenty Years Ago Today, a theme night celebrating the 1960s.
  - Brookside is moved from Wednesdays to Mondays which means the soap can now be seen on Mondays and Tuesdays on Channel 4.
- 2 January – Channel 4 begins airing the acclaimed series A Woman of Substance, a miniseries based on the novel of the same name by Barbara Taylor Bradford. The series airs over three consecutive nights and garners the channel an audience of 13.8 million, its largest to date.
- 3–6 January – The UK's last VHF 405-line television transmitters close down. Transmissions in England, Wales and Northern Ireland end on the 3rd, although a few relays continue to broadcast on 405-lines until the 6th. 405-line transmission in Scotland ends on the 4th.
- 4 January
  - The network television premiere of the 1980 smash hit sequel Superman II on ITV, starring Christopher Reeve, Margot Kidder and Gene Hackman.
  - Channel 4 achieves its highest ever audience as 13.8 million viewers tune in for the final part of the miniseries A Woman of Substance.
- 6 January – The first Screen Two broadcast takes place. The first film to be broadcast as part of this anthology is Alan Clarke's Contact, a largely dialogue-free film about the British military presence in Northern Ireland during the Troubles.
- 7 January – The BBC ends its experiment with afternoon broadcasting and from that afternoon Pages from Ceefax is shown on BBC1 between the end of lunchtime programmes and the start of children's programmes and on BBC2 Ceefax pages are shown continuously between 9am and 5:25pm apart from when Daytime on Two is in season and when sporting events are being shown.
- 11 January – Debut of the comedy sketch show Victoria Wood as Seen on TV on BBC2.
- 12 January
  - Channel 4 debuts a one-off comedy and music show, Saturday Live, hosted by Lenny Henry and based on the same format as the long-running US comedy show, Saturday Night Live. A full series isn't commissioned until a year later.
  - The crime fighting duo Dempsey and Makepeace made their debut on ITV.
- 17 January – Thames makes a deal with international distributors for American production company Lorimar to purchase the UK broadcasting rights for the drama Dallas, thus taking it from the BBC and breaking a gentlemen's agreement between the BBC and ITV not to poach each other's imported shows. Thames have paid £55,000 per episode compared to the £29,000 paid by the BBC. The deal is condemned by both the BBC and other ITV companies who fear the BBC will poach their imports in retaliation and push up prices. In response to the Thames deal, the BBC plan to delay transmission of the episodes they already have so that they will clash with the episodes being shown by Thames. Ultimately, however, pressure from several ITV companies, especially Yorkshire Television to the Independent Broadcasting Authority forces Thames to sell the series back to the BBC at a loss. The controversy leads to the resignation of Thames managing director Bryan Cowgill who feels the board have not supported him, he leaves the company on 12 July.
- 18 January – Debut of The Practice, a twice-weekly medical drama intended to become Granada's second soap produced for the ITV network. But viewing figures are not as healthy as had been hoped and the series first run ends in May. It returns for a second series in 1986 before being axed.
- 20 January – The American sitcom The Cosby Show makes its UK debut on Channel 4.
- 23 January – A debate in the House of Lords is televised for the first time.

=== February ===
- 4 February – The American detective series Miami Vice, starring Don Johnson and Philip Michael Thomas, makes its UK debut on BBC1 with the feature-length episode Brother's Keeper.
- 12 February – Debut of Television, a 13-part Granada documentary series narrated by Ian Holm that explores the history of the medium.
- 16 February – The British television premiere of John Landis' 1981 horror comedy film An American Werewolf in London on BBC1, starring David Naughton, Griffin Dunne, Jenny Agutter, John Woodvine and Brian Glover, with special appearances by Frank Oz and Jim Henson from The Muppets.
- 18 February
  - BBC1 undergoes a major relaunch under controller Michael Grade:
    - An element of stripped and stranded programming is introduced.
    - At 5:35pm, the legendary mechanical "mirror globe" ident, in use in varying forms since 1969, is seen for the last time on regular rotation on BBC1, although the regional versions are seen for the final time an hour later. Its replacement, the COW (Computer Originated World), makes its debut at 7pm.
    - The first usage of the COW ident introduces the first edition of the relaunch of Terry Wogan's eponymous talk show which is now shown as a thrice-weekly live primetime programme.
  - Computer-generated graphics replace magnetic weather maps on all BBC forecasts.
- 19 February – Debut of the long-running soap opera EastEnders on BBC1, set in the East End of London.

=== March ===
- 17 March – BBC2 begins airing a two-part series of The Executioner's Song, a film about the life of killer Gary Gilmore who demanded the implementation of his death sentence for two murders he committed in Utah. The second part of the film is shown on 24 March.
- 19 March – BBC1 begins showing The Day the Universe Changed, a ten-part series in which science historian James Burke looks at how advances in science and technology have shaped western society over the last five centuries.
- 29 March – Play School is shown in the afternoon for the final time on BBC1.
- 30 March – Doctor Who goes on an unexpected hiatus following the broadcast of part 2 of Revelation of the Daleks due to a dispute between the show's staff and BBC controller Michael Grade, a notorious detractor of the show, the long-running science fiction series will resume airing the following year.
- 31 March – BBC2 begins airing a season of films directed by Francis Ford Coppola, beginning with the network television premiere of the 1979 Vietnam War epic Apocalypse Now, a film inspired by the Joseph Conrad's 1899 novella Heart of Darkness and starring Martin Sheen and Marlon Brando.

=== April ===
- 1 April
  - Bertha, a new stop-motion animated series from Woodland Animations, the team behind Postman Pat, makes its debut on BBC1.
  - The final episode of the long-running sitcom Are You Being Served? airs on BBC1.
- 4 April – Max Headroom makes its UK debut on Channel 4, with the sci-fi television movie Max Headroom: 20 Minutes into the Future.
- 6 April – The network television premiere of the 1974 Mel Brooks comedy western film Blazing Saddles on BBC1.
- 8 April – BBC1 shows the 1981 action comedy film The Cannonball Run, starring Burt reynolds and Roger Moore.
- 10 April – The network television premiere of the 1981 horror movie sequel Omen III: The Final Conflict on ITV.
- 13 April – Michael Praed appears for the final time as Robin Hood in the ITV series Robin of Sherwood, after being dramatically killed off in the second season's finale.
- 19 April – The final episode of the game show Odd One Out airs on BBC1.
- 28 April – The World Snooker Championship Final between Dennis Taylor and Steve Davis draws BBC2's highest ever rating of 18.5 million viewers. The final goes on past midnight and this broadcast remains a record for a post-midnight audience in the UK.

=== May ===
- 5 May – As part of the 40th anniversary celebrations of VE Day, ITV airs A Royal Celebration: 40 Years of Peace, featuring the music of British artists such as Lonnie Donegan, Paul Jones, Brian Poole, Joe Brown, Wayne Fontana, Marty Wilde and Cliff Richard.
- 7 May – The American action series Street Hawk makes its UK debut on ITV, while the BBC's Crystal Tipps and Alistair jumped ship to Children's ITV that afternoon.
- 8 May – The 40th anniversary of VE Day is marked by a service of remembrance at Westminster Abbey attended by politicians and members of the royal family, broadcast on television.
- 11 May – A fire breaks out at the Valley Parade stadium in Bradford during a football match between Bradford City and Lincoln City. The match is being recorded by Yorkshire Television for transmission on their Sunday afternoon regional football show The Big Match for the following day. Coverage of the fire is transmitted minutes after the event on the live ITV Saturday afternoon sports programme World of Sport. BBC's Grandstand also transmits live coverage of the fire.
- 17 May – Screensport covers the Football League Trophy Southern Area Final between Brentford and Newport County, the first time a match in an English senior competition has been broadcast exclusively on a satellite channel. The Northern equivalent and the Wembley final will also be shown.
- 19 May – The long-running American crime detective series Murder, She Wrote makes its UK debut on ITV, starring London-born Angela Lansbury.
- 29 May – The Heysel Stadium Disaster is televised live by BBC1 at the European Cup final in Brussels, Belgium, between Liverpool and Juventus: 39 Juventus fans are killed when a wall collapses during a riot at the Heysel Stadium.
- 31 May
  - The British television premiere of Richard O'Brien's cult 1975 musical movie The Rocky Horror Picture Show on Channel 4, starring Tim Curry, Susan Sarandon, Barry Bostwick, Meat Loaf and Charles Gray.
  - Max Bygraves presents his last episode of Family Fortunes on ITV. It will then be put on hiatus until 1987.
- May – TSW unveils a computerised version of its ident.

=== June ===
- 3 June – ITV London and Southern regions begin showing "V": The Series, the follow-up series to the cult US sci-fi alien visitors drama. Other ITV regions air the show shortly afterwards, with ITV Midlands on 26 August; however, STV do not show it until 10 March 1986 following a repeat of the original miniseries.
- 5 June – The crime drama Bulman, a spin-off from Strangers makes its debut on ITV.
- 12 June – David Dundas who composed the Channel 4 theme, wins a legal battle to retain all rights to the music and £1000 a week in royalties.
- 21 June – Channel 4 airs Europe in Concert, a three-and-a-half-hour sequence of classical performances presented by Peter Sissons.
- 28 June – The end of the 1984/85 school year sees the closure of the Daytime on Two information service and when it returns in September the gaps are filled by interval captions and, for breaks of more than 10 minutes, the usual Ceefax miscellany.

=== July ===
- 4 July
  - Debut of Tandoori Nights, a sitcom about rival Indian restaurants in London's Brick Lane starring Saeed Jaffrey which is Channel 4's first Asian comedy.
  - June Brown makes her EastEnders debut as Dot Cotton, appearing on-screen until 1993 before returning in 1997 and remaining in the soap until 2020.
- 6 July – The US sitcom Family Ties, starring Michael J Fox makes its UK debut on Channel 4.
- 7 July – Debut of The Rock 'n' Roll Years on BBC1, a series that looks at the music and events of a particular year, starting with 1956.
- 13 July – The Live Aid concerts are held at Wembley Stadium in London and the JFK Stadium in Philadelphia and are televised on the BBC. The Wembley concert is shown in its entirety on BBC2 from midday, with BBC1 showing the Philadelphia concert later this evening. Over £50 million is raised for famine relief in Ethiopia.
- 14 July – Watchdog launches as a stand-alone programme on BBC1, having previously been a segment within the teatime news magazine programmes Nationwide and Sixty Minutes.
- 17 July – BBC1 airs the season 8 finale of Dallas which sees the death of Bobby Ewing after his crazed ex-sister-in-law Katherine Wentworth ran him down with her car. At the time there was still negotiations of whatever the BBC would show the following season after the controversial purchase by Thames earlier in the year.
- 27 July – BBC2 airs "Blues Night", an Arena special dedicated to the Blues and featuring artists from the genre, including Sonny Boy Williamson, B. B. King, Blind John Davis and Big Bill Broonzy.
- 30 July – Debut of the pop music culture series No Limits on BBC2.
- 31 July
  - The BBC announces it has pulled At the Edge of the Troubles, a documentary in the Real Lives strand in which filmmaker Vincent Hanna secured an interview with Sinn Féin's Martin McGuinness and his wife. The announcement leads to a one-day strike by members of the National Union of Journalists and the eventual overturning of the ban. A slightly edited version of the programme is shown in October. The controversy damages the Director-Generalship of Alasdair Milne who eventually resigns from the post in 1987.
  - The War Game, made for the BBC's The Wednesday Play strand in 1965 but banned from broadcast at the time, is finally shown on television as part of BBC2's After the Bomb season.

=== August ===
- August – After a series of football hooliganism events, and a dispute between the Football League and the broadcasters over revenue, televised league football is missing from British television screens until the second half of the season. The Charity Shield and international games are the only matches screened.
- 1 August – The nuclear war docudrama Threads is repeated on BBC1 as part of the After the Bomb series.
- 5 August – The American animated series Transformers makes its British debut on ITV's TV-am morning programme. Each episode is split into five minute segments and shown over the course of the week. It is initially broadcast during Roland Rat's weekday morning slot, before moving to TV-am's subsequent children's weekday segment Wacaday in October 1985, using the same format. TV-am will also go on to show the rival animated show Gobots, several weeks later during the weekend slot Wide Awake Club.
- 13 August – ITV airs the American intergalactic whodunnit Murder in Space. The film is shown without the ending and a competition held for viewers to identify the murderer(s). The film's concluding 30 minutes is shown a few weeks later, with a studio of contestants eliminated one by one until the winner correctly solves the mystery. There is a prize of £10,000.
- 17 August – Central began previewing their new logo (dubbed by viewers as the "Central Cake" logo) in promos.
- 24 August – S4C airs Helfa Drysor, a pilot for a Welsh-language version of Channel 4's Treasure Hunt, with Robin Jones and Sioned Maid taking on the roles of Kenneth Kendall and Anneka Rice. The show is not picked up for a series, making the programme a one-off special.
- 30 August
  - Debut of Granada's "continuing drama series", Albion Market. The series, set in a market in Salford and intended as a companion for Coronation Street, is panned by critics and suffers from poor ratings. It is axed a year later.
  - The weekday lunchtime Financial Report, broadcast on BBC1 in London and the south east, is broadcast for the final time ahead of the launch of a lunchtime regional news bulletin for viewers in the BBC South East region.
  - Central launches a new presentation package that sees its moon logo redesigned into a three-dimensional shape dubbed by viewers as the "Central Cake" logo.
- 31 August – Scottish Television launches a new computer-generated ident.

=== September ===
- 1 September
  - Debut of the drama series Howards' Way on BBC1.
  - Ealing Cable launches Home Video Channel which shows low-budget movies devoted to horror, action/adventure, science fiction and erotica; subsequently rolled out to other cable operators by sending tapes and a copy of the programme schedule so that can be played out locally.
- 2 September – The American series She-Ra: Princess of Power makes its premiere on Children's ITV.
- 3 September
  - BBC1's EastEnders moves from 7pm to 7:30pm to avoid clashing with ITV's Emmerdale Farm which airs in the 7pm timeslot on Tuesdays and Thursdays in many ITV regions.
  - Debut of the game show Telly Addicts on BBC1, presented by Noel Edmonds.
  - Debut of the game show Crosswits on ITV, presented by Barry Cryer and later Tom O'Connor.
- 6 September
  - The weekly regional programmes slot moves to BBC2, airing at 8pm on Fridays. They had previously been shown late in the evening on BBC1.
  - Channel 4 screens Martin Scorsese's Oscar winning 1980 Boxing drama Raging Bull, starring Robert De Niro.
- 7 September – The American sci-fi adventure series Otherworld makes its UK debut in the HTV region. The series is aired by the Anglia, Border, Central, Grampian and Granada regions from 2 November with most other companies starting to show it in 1986, the exception being Thames/LWT which never airs it.
- 8 September – BBC1 'closes down' on Sunday mornings for the final time, albeit since 1983 with broadcasts of Pages from Ceefax, as from next year repeats are shown during the adult educational Sunday morning slot's annual Summer break.
- 9 September – Children's BBC is launched on BBC1 with Phillip Schofield presenting from "The Broom Cupboard".
- 10 September – ITV airs the Wales vs Scotland World Cup qualifier from Cardiff's Ninian Park. The match, played against the backdrop of escalating football hooliganism is notable for the death of Scotland manager Jock Stein who collapses shortly before Scotland secure their place in the 1986 FIFA World Cup.
- 15 September – ITV airs Murder in Space: The Solution in which the puzzle of the sci-fi murder mystery is finally solved, hosted by Anneka Rice and Roger Cook (the latter making his debut for ITV).
- 17 September – Screensport covers, and sponsors, the Football League Super Cup, a competition designed to compensate clubs banned from European competition following the Heysel Stadium disaster.
- 22 September – Channel 4 celebrates 30 years of ITV with an evening of classic programmes from them.
- 26 September – Mooncat and Co (formerly known as Get Up and Go!) is broadcast for the final time.
- 27 September – EastEnders begins airing on TVNZ in New Zealand, making it the first country outside the UK to air the soap.
- 28 September – After 20 years on the air, ITV's Saturday afternoon sports programme World of Sport is broadcast for the last time.

=== October ===
- 1 October – ORACLE revamps its service. The pages on ITV become more news focused and more regional pages are added and the content on Channel 4 becomes more magazine focussed. The changes also see the end of duplicate pages on both channels.
- 2 October – The Times reports that Thames Television have paid the BBC £300,000 in compensation to make up for the additional costs it paid for new episodes of Dallas.
- 3 October – Roland Rat, the puppet rodent who saved an ailing TV-am in 1983, transfers to the BBC. Commenting on the move, he says, "I saved TV-am and now I'm here to save the BBC."
- 3 October – Puddle Lane, a television programme for preschoolers and the replacement programme for Get Up and Go!/Mooncat and Co, makes its debut on ITV.
- 5 October
  - With World of Sport now cancelled from the Saturday afternoon schedule, some features that were regularly on the programme are now stand-alone series:
    - The Wrestling is now being shown at lunchtimes as it was during the final weeks of World of Sport after it has previously been a late afternoon feature.
    - Ian St John and Jimmy Greaves who hosted the football preview segment On the Ball is now renamed Saint and Greavsie.
    - Horse racing is now being shown on weekends on Channel 4 as they had been showing on midweek since 1984.
    - The Results Service which was normally the last segment of World of Sport is now hosted by Elton Welsby.
- 6 October – The final episode of the classic sitcom Open All Hours is broadcast on BBC1, although it will be rebooted in 2013 as Still Open All Hours.
- 23 October – The sitcom Girls on Top makes its debut on ITV, starring Dawn French, Jennifer Saunders and Ruby Wax.
- 28 October – An edition of ITV's World in Action series casts doubt on evidence used to convict the Birmingham Six of the 1974 Birmingham pub bombings.
- 29–30 October – Thames broadcasts its second Telethon.
- 30 October – Children's ITV shows the American animated Halloween special Garfield in Disguise.

=== November ===
- 4 November – BBC2 shows the first episode of the acclaimed drama, Edge of Darkness, in which a mourning father uncovers a conspiracy around his daughter's death. Starring Bob Peck and Joanne Whalley.
- 11 November – The 1000th episode of Emmerdale Farm, which airs the following day, is celebrated with a special lunch attended by Princess Michael of Kent. Not recognising any of the cast members, she later admits that she never watches the show.
- 14 November – A special edition of Tomorrow's World examines how effective the proposed Strategic Defense Initiative (Star Wars) might be at destroying any nuclear weapons launched at the United States.
- 30 November – Debut of the dating game show Blind Date on ITV, presented by Cilla Black.

=== December ===
- 4 December – Due to a clash with ITV morning broadcaster TV-am for a 0900 UK time kick off, Scottish Television production Scotsport is screened on Channel 4 for the only time, broadcasting Australia v Scotland in a 1986 Football World Cup Qualifier.
- 6 December – BBC1 airs John Lennon: A Journey in the Life, an Everyman special marking the fifth anniversary of the murder of John Lennon. The programme includes archive footage of Lennon, dramatisations of parts of his life and contributions from some of his friends.
- 9 December – 25th anniversary of the first episode of Coronation Street.
- 13 December – The last episode of the fifth season of Dynasty is shown on BBC1 and sees the entire wedding party of Amanda Carrington (Catherine Oxenberg) and Prince Michael of Moldavia (Michael Praed) shot by revolutionaries in what is known as the Moldavian Massacre. British viewers would wait the following week to see the next episode.
- 22 December – Having been broadcast every Sunday teatime since the launch of BBC2 in 1964, News Review airs for the final time. It is replaced in the new year by NewsView, a Saturday early evening bulletin which combines the day's news with a look back at the week's news.
- 23 December – ITV shows the 1980 comedy film 9 to 5, starring Jane Fonda, Lily Tomlin, and Dolly Parton.
- 24 December – The network television premiere of the 1981 Dudley Moore comedy film Arthur on ITV.
- 25 December
  - Christmas Day highlights on BBC1 include the premiere of Jim Henson's Muppet Babies and a Wogan special in which Terry Wogan travels to Denver to meet the actors who portray members of the Carrington family from the American soap Dynasty. Roland Rat also appears in the Christmas Day schedule with Roland's Yuletide Binge, a general entertainment programme featuring guests including Russell Grant, Frankie Howerd, Jan Leeming, Ian McCaskill, Beryl Reid and Valerie Singleton. This years Only Fools and Horses Christmas Special is the first feature-length episode of the show to be broadcast.
  - Minder on the Orient Express, is also a feature-length episode of the series Minder, and is broadcast as the highlight of ITV's Christmas Day schedule.
  - The network television premiere of the 1980 romantic comedy film Gregory's Girl on ITV.
- 26 December
  - Boxing Day highlights on BBC1 include Tenko Reunion, a feature-length episode of Tenko that reunites the cast in a story set five years after the original series.
  - Boxing Day highlights on ITV include the network television premiere of the 1982 political thriller Who Dares Wins, starring Lewis Collins, Judy Davis, Edward Woodward and Richard Widmark.
- 29 December – The network television premiere of Richard Attenborough's eight-time Oscar-winning 1982 biopic Gandhi on BBC1, starring Ben Kingsley.
- 30 December – Channel 4 celebrates Granada's 30th birthday with an evening of programmes from the 1960s, including Bootsie and Snudge and a compilation of From the North.
- 31 December – New Year's Eve highlights on BBC1 include repeat showings of the classic films Gone with the Wind and The Magnificent Seven, as well as a version of Terence Ratigan's The Browning Version with Ian Holm while Terry Wogan welcomes in 1986 from BBC Television Centre.

=== Unknown ===
- London Weekend Television comes to an agreement with TVS to help to fill its schedules with domestically produced programming while not having to increase its budget. This helps TVS to get more of its programmes onto the ITV network.
- Swindon's cable service is rebranded as Swindon Cable and its news programme is renamed as part of this move and becomes Focus on Swindon. The channel increases the programme's frequency from twice a week to three times a week.

== Debuts ==
=== BBC1 ===
- 3 January – Dogtanian and the Three Muskehounds (1981–1982)
- 6 January – The Pickwick Papers (1985)
- 10 January – Charters and Caldicott (1985)
- 15 January – Bird Fancier (1985)
- 4 February – Miami Vice (1984–1989)
- 5 February – Maelstrom (1985)
- 19 February – EastEnders (1985–present)
- 15 March – Late Starter (1985)
- 19 March – The Day the Universe Changed (1985)
- 21 March – I Woke Up One Morning (1985–1986)
- 1 April – Bertha the Machine (1985–1986)
- 3 April – The Biskitts (1983–1984)
- 11 April – Cover Up (1984–1985)
- 15 April – Three Up, Two Down (1985–1989)
- 17 May – Catchword (1985–1995)
- 14 July – We'll Support You Evermore (1985)
- 28 July – Honeymoon (1985)
- 11 August – Queen of Hearts (1985)
- 1 September
  - Howards' Way (1985–1990)
  - In Sickness and In Health (1985–1992)
- 3 September – Telly Addicts (1985–1998)
- 25 September – Fingermouse (1985)
- 27 September – Friday Film Special (1985–1989)
- 1 October – Galloping Galaxies! (1985–1986)
- 13 October – Oliver Twist (1985)
- 17 October – Happy Families (1985)
- 21 October – Masterteam (1985–1987)
- 7 November – Ulysses 31 (1981–1982)
- 11 November – Jonny Briggs (1985–1987)
- 12 November – Hold the Back Page (1985–1986)
- 22 December – Shadowlands (1985)
- 25 December – Muppet Babies (1985–1991)

=== BBC2 ===
- 6 January – Screen Two (1985–1998)
- 9 January – Anna of the Five Towns (1985)
- 11 January – Victoria Wood as Seen on TV (1985–1987)
- 17 January – The Mistress (1985–1987)
- 6 February – Blott on the Landscape (1985)
- 26 March – Oscar (1985)
- 10 April – Bleak House (1985)
- 30 July – No Limits (1985–1987)
- 12 August – My Brother Jonathan (1985)
- 30 August – Cool It (1985–1990)
- 4 November – Edge of Darkness (1985)

=== BBC Alba ===
- 17 October – Dòtaman (1985–present)

=== ITV ===
- 2 January – Gems (1985–1988)
- 3 January
  - The Little Green Man (1985)
  - Night Train to Murder (1985)
- 6 January – The Beiderbecke Affair (1985)
- 7 January
  - Chocky's Children (1985)
  - Full House (1985–1986)
  - Moving (1985)
- 9 January – Lytton's Diary (1985–1986)
- 11 January – Dempsey and Makepeace (1985–1986)
- 18 January – The Practice (1985–1986)
- 20 January – Supergran (1985–1987)
- 17 February – Cover Her Face (1985)
- 18 February
  - Dodger, Bonzo and the Rest (1985–1986)
  - The Last Place on Earth (1985)
- 25 February – Roll Over Beethoven (1985)
- 26 February – Busman's Holiday (1985–1993)
- 28 February – Street Hawk (1985)
- 26 March – Alice in Wonderland (1985)
- 3 April – Arthur C. Clarke's World of Strange Powers (1985)
- 4 April – T-Bag (1985–1992)
- 6 April – Love Song (1985)
- 12 April – C.A.T.S. Eyes (1985–1987)
- 16 April – The Wall Game (1985)
- 19 April – Home to Roost (1985–1990)
- 21 April – Travellers by Night (1985)
- 26 April – Connections (1985–1990)
- 1 May – Tales from Fat Tulip's Garden (1985–1987)
- 19 May – Murder, She Wrote (1984–1996)
- 26 May – Connie (1985)
- 26 May – Mog (1985–1986)
- 3 June – Jenny's War (1985)
- 5 June – Bulman (1985–1987)
- 28 June – Marjorie and Men (1985)
- 28 June – And There's More (1985–1988)
- 2 August – High & Dry (1985–1987)
- 5 August – Transformers (1984–1987)
- 13 August – Murder in Space (1985)
- 30 August
  - Albion Market (1985–1986)
  - Drummonds (1985–1987)
  - South of the Border (1985)
- 2 September – She-Ra: Princess of Power (1985–1986)
- 3 September – Crosswits (1985–1998)
- 4 September – The Brothers McGregor (1985–1988)
- 5 September – Children of the Dog Star (1984)
- 7 September – Gobots (1984–1985)
- 7 September – Otherworld (1985)
- 15 September – Stookie (1985)
- 16 September
  - The Secret Diary of Adrian Mole (1985)
  - The Winning Streak (1985)
- 19 September – The Giddy Game Show (1985–1987)
- 23 September – From the Top (1985–1986)
- 3 October – Puddle Lane (1985–1989)
- 5 October – Saint and Greavsie (1985–1992)
- 21 October – Wacaday (1985–1992)
- 23 October – Girls on Top (1985–1986)
- 1 November – Your Mother Wouldn't Like It (1985–1988)
- 8 November – The Black tower (1985)
- 10 November – Golden Pennies (1985)
- 13 November – Alias the Jester (1985–1986)
- 17 November – Romance on the Orient Express (1985)
- 24 November – Dutch Girls (1985)
- 30 November
  - Copy Cats (1985–1987)
  - Blind Date (1985–2003, 2017–2019)
- 26 December – The Joke Machine (1985–1986)
- 30 December – All in Good Faith (1985–1988)
- Unknown
  - Highway to Heaven (1984–1989)
  - Off Peak (1985)

=== Channel 4 ===
- 2 January
  - A Woman of Substance (1985)
  - Princess Sarah (1985)
- 12 January – Saturday Live (1985–1988)
- 14 January – Relative Strangers (1985–1987)
- 17 January – Assaulted Nuts (1985)
- 20 January – The Cosby Show (1984–1992)
- 4 April – Max Headroom (1985–1987)
- 6 April – God Rot Tunbridge Wells! (1985)
- 12 April – ECT (1985)
- 14 April – Mapp and Lucia (1985–1986)
- 15 April – Mann's Best Friends (1985)
- 16 May – Sacred Hearts (1985)
- June – Honour, Profit and Pleasure (1985)
- 4 July – Tandoori Nights (1985–1987)
- 6 July – Family Ties (1982–1989)
- 6 October – Pob's Programme (1985–1988)
- 22 December – The Mysteries (1985–1986)

=== Sky Channel ===
- Unknown – Fun Factory (1985–1994)

== Channels ==
=== New channels ===
Date	Channel
2 June	Mirrorvision
1 September	Home Video Channel
29 September	The Arts Channel
30 October	Lifestyle
20 December	Bravo

=== Defunct channels ===
Date	Channel
2 June	The Entertainment Network

== Television shows ==
=== Returning this year after a break of one year or longer ===
- The Jetsons (1962–1963, 1985–1987)
- Open All Hours (BBC2 1976, BBC1 1981–1982, 1985, 2013)
- Sorry! (1981–1982, 1985–1988)

== Continuing television shows ==
=== 1920s ===
- BBC Wimbledon (1927–1939, 1946–2019, 2021–present)

=== 1930s ===
- Trooping the Colour (1937–1939, 1946–2019, 2023–present)
- The Boat Race (1938–1939, 1946–2019, 2021–present)
- BBC Cricket (1939, 1946–1999, 2020–2024)

=== 1940s ===
- Come Dancing (1949–1998)

=== 1950s ===
- What's My Line? (1951–1964, 1984–1996)
- Panorama (1953–present)
- What the Papers Say (1956–2008)
- The Sky at Night (1957–present)
- Blue Peter (1958–present)
- Grandstand (1958–2007)

=== 1960s ===
- Coronation Street (1960–present)
- Songs of Praise (1961–present)
- Doctor Who (1963–1989, 1996, 2005–present)
- World in Action (1963–1998)
- Top of the Pops (1964–2006)
- Match of the Day (1964–present)
- Crossroads (1964–1988, 2001–2003)
- Play School (1964–1988)
- Mr. and Mrs. (1965–1999)
- World of Sport (1965–1985)
- Jackanory (1965–1996, 2006)
- Sportsnight (1965–1997)
- Call My Bluff (1965–2005)
- The Money Programme (1966–2010)
- Reksio (1967–1990)
- The Big Match (1968–2002)

=== 1970s ===
- The Old Grey Whistle Test (1971–1987)
- The Two Ronnies (1971–1987, 1991, 1996, 2005)
- Pebble Mill at One (1972–1986, 1991–1996)
- Rainbow (1972–1992, 1994–1997)
- Emmerdale (1972–present)
- Newsround (1972–present)
- Weekend World (1972–1988)
- We Are the Champions (1973–1987)
- Last of the Summer Wine (1973–2010)
- That's Life! (1973–1994)
- Wish You Were Here...? (1974–2003)
- Arena (1975–present)
- Jim'll Fix It (1975–1994)
- One Man and His Dog (1976–present)
- 3-2-1 (1978–1988)
- Grange Hill (1978–2008)
- Ski Sunday (1978–present)
- Terry and June (1979–1987)
- The Book Tower (1979–1989)
- Blankety Blank (1979–1990, 1997–2002)
- The Paul Daniels Magic Show (1979–1994)
- Antiques Roadshow (1979–present)
- Question Time (1979–present)

=== 1980s ===
- Play Your Cards Right (1980–1987, 1994–1999, 2002–2003)
- Family Fortunes (1980–2002, 2006–2015, 2020–present)
- Juliet Bravo (1980–1985)
- Cockleshell Bay (1980–1986)
- Children in Need (1980–present)
- Finders Keepers (1981–1985)
- Freetime (1981–1985)
- Game for a Laugh (1981–1985)
- Tenko (1981–1985)
- That's My Boy (1981–1986)
- Razzamatazz (1981–1987)
- Bergerac (1981–1991)
- Odd One Out (1982–1985)
- On Safari (1982–1985)
- 'Allo 'Allo! (1982–1992)
- Wogan (1982–1992)
- Saturday Superstore (1982–1987)
- The Tube (1982–1987)
- Brookside (1982–2003)
- Countdown (1982–present)
- Let's Pretend (TV series) (1982–1988)
- No. 73 (1982–1988)
- Timewatch (1982–present)
- Right to Reply (1982–2001)
- Up the Elephant and Round the Castle (1983–1985)
- Inspector Gadget (1983–1986)
- Bananaman (1983–1986)
- Just Good Friends (1983–1986)
- Philip Marlowe, Private Eye (1983–1986)
- Breadwinners (1983–1986)
- Breakfast Time (1983–1989)
- Dramarama (1983–1989)
- Don't Wait Up (1983–1990)
- Good Morning Britain (1983–1992)
- First Tuesday (1983–1993)
- Highway (1983–1993)
- Blockbusters (1983–93, 1994–95, 1997, 2000–01, 2012, 2019)

== Ending this year ==
- 26 January – The Saturday Starship (1984–1985)
- 1 March – Finders Keepers (1981–1985)
- 1 April – Are You Being Served? (1972–1985)
- 19 April – Odd One Out (1982–1985)
- 28 May – Gambit (1975–1985, 1995)
- 24 June – Jenny's War (1985)
- 13 July – The Comedians (1971–1985)
- 24 August – Bottle Boys (1984–1985)
- 28 August – Freetime (1981–1985)
- 28 September – World of Sport (1965–1985)
- 6 October – Open All Hours (1976, 1981–1982, 1985, 2013)
- 21 October – The Secret Diary of Adrian Mole (1985)
- 7 November – Up the Elephant and Round the Castle (1983–1985)
- 23 November – Game for a Laugh (1981–1985)
- 19 December – Murphy's Mob (1982–1985)
- 26 December – Tenko (1981–1985)
- 31 December
  - Juliet Bravo (1980–1985)
  - Princess Sarah (1985)

== Births ==
- 24 January – Josie Gibson, English personal trainer and television host
- 31 January – Rasmus Hardiker, actor and voice actor
- 19 March – Gemma Cairney, television and radio presenter and fashion stylist
- 26 March – Keira Knightley, actress
- 2 May – Lily Allen, singer
- 28 May – Carey Mulligan, actress
- 7 June – Adam Nagaitis, actor
- 8 June – Joel Dommett, English actor, author, comedian and television presenter
- 15 July – Sarah-Jane Crawford, radio and television presenter
- 22 July – Blake Harrison, actor
- 15 August – Verity Rushworth, actress
- 1 October – Emerald Fennell, screen actress and director
- 8 November – Jack Osbourne, English-born American television personality actor
- 10 December – Scarlett Bowman, actress

== Deaths ==
Date	Name	Age	Cinematic Credibility
2 January	Basil Bartlett	79	actor and screenwriter
12 January	Paul Luty	52	actor (Coronation Street, Love Thy Neighbour, Emmerdale, Rosie, In Loving Memory)
18 January	Wilfrid Brambell	72	actor (Steptoe in Steptoe and Son)
29 January	Chic Murray	65	actor and comedian
5 February	Neil McCarthy	52	actor (The Avengers, The Saint, Z-Cars, Randall and Hopkirk (Deceased), Some Mothers Do 'Ave 'Em, Only When I Laugh, Emmerdale)
14 February	Eva Mottley	31	actress (Bergerac, Only Fools and Horses, Widows)
19 February	Dorothy Black	85	actress
9 March	John Tudor Jones	81	presenter
1 April	Alec Clifton-Taylor	76	presenter (The Spirit of the Age, Six English Towns)
5 April	Arthur Negus	82	antiques expert
14 April	Noele Gordon	65	actress (Meg Mortimer in Crossroads)
21 April	John Welsh	70	actor (The Duchess of Duke Street, Brideshead Revisited, Softly, Softly)
16 May	Hugh Burden	72	actor (The Mind of Mr. J.G. Reeder, Sykes, The Avengers)
22 May	Gerald Case	79–80	actor
1 June	Richard Greene	66	actor (The Adventures of Robin Hood)
7 June	Gordon Rollings	59	actor and presenter (Z-Cars, Charlie Moffett in Coronation Street, Play School)
9 June	Clifford Evans	73	actor (The Avengers, The Saint, Randall and Hopkirk (Deceased), Codename)
24 June	Valentine Dyall	77	actor (Secret Army, Doctor Who)
2 July	Hector Nicol	64	actor and comedian
16 July	Elsie Wagstaff	86	actress
18 July	Robert Raglan	76	actor (Colonel Pritchard in Dad's Army)
7 August	Joanne Cole	51	animator (Bod, Fingerbobs, Gran)
21 August	Maxwell Shaw	55	actor
29 August	Patrick Barr	77	actor (Doctor Who, Randall and Hopkirk (Deceased))
22 September	Dickie Henderson	62	presenter
30 October	David Oxley	64	actor
20 November	Victor Henry	42	actor
23 November	Leslie Mitchell	80	announcer
12 December	Barry MacKay	79	actor
23 December	Philip Mackie	67	screenwriter

== See also ==
- 1985 in British music
- 1985 in British radio
- 1985 in the United Kingdom
- List of British films of 1985
