= 1983 in British radio =

This is a list of events in British radio during 1983.

== Events ==
=== January ===
- 4 January – BBC Radio 2 revives Music While You Work.
- 17 January – BBC Local Radio comes to south west England with the launches of BBC Radio Devon and BBC Radio Cornwall.

=== February ===
- 12 February – Sounds of the 60s is broadcast for the first time on BBC Radio 2.

=== March ===
- No events.

=== April ===
- 18 April – Prior to the launch of a commercial station covering Gwent, the BBC launches BBC Radio Gwent. It broadcasts at peak time, opting out of BBC Radio Wales. The station broadcasts on VHF/FM and therefore becomes the only part of Wales where English-language radio programming for Wales can be heard on VHF/FM.

=== May ===
- Undated in May – The first Birmingham Walkathon is staged by Birmingham's BRMB to raise money for charity, and takes place around the city's Outer Circle bus route.

=== June ===
- 13 June – Gwent Broadcasting becomes the first station in the UK to occupy the newly released 102.2 to 104.5Mhz part of the VHF/FM waveband.

=== July ===
- 2 July – BBC Radio Medway is expanded to cover all of the county of Kent and is renamed accordingly.

=== August ===
- 19 August – "Pirate" radio station Radio Caroline resumes broadcasting to Britain in an album-oriented rock format from MV Ross Revenge anchored in the Knock Deep outside UK territorial waters off the Thames Estuary.

=== September ===
- No events.

=== October ===
- 3 October – The first of five trial stations, each operating for approximately two months in various parts of the Manchester area, and opting out of BBC Radio Manchester on weekday mornings, launches when BBC Radio Oldham makes its first broadcast. The trials operate in turn with only one on air at any time, meaning that the same frequency – 1296 kHz MW – can be used for each station.
- 6 October – Centre Radio stops broadcasting after running into financial difficulties. A take-over bid is rejected by the IBA and the station goes off air at 5.30pm.
- 22 October – BBC Radio Brighton is expanded to cover all of the county of Sussex and is accordingly renamed BBC Radio Sussex.

=== November ===
- No events.

=== December ===
- 12 December – BBC Radio Bury becomes the second trial community station. and uses the 1296 kHz AM frequency in turn.
- 18 December – Sounds of Jazz is broadcast on BBC Radio 1 for the final time. The show is transferred to Radio 2 in the new year.
- Undated in December – Kenny Everett leaves BBC Radio 2 a couple of weeks after he made a risqué on-air joke about Margaret Thatcher.

== Station debuts ==
- 17 January –
  - BBC Radio Devon
  - BBC Radio Cornwall
- 4 April – County Sound
- 11 April – BBC Radio Tweed
- 16 April – BBC Radio Solway
- 18 April – BBC Radio Gwent
- 13 June – Gwent Broadcasting
- 4 July – BBC Radio York
- 29 August – Southern Sound Radio
- 5 September –
  - Signal 1
  - Marcher Sound
- Unknown – Bridgend Hospital Radio

== Programme debuts ==
- 1 February – In Business on BBC Radio 4 (1983–Present)
- 12 February – Sounds of the 60s on BBC Radio 2 (1983–Present)

== Continuing radio programmes ==
=== 1940s ===
- Sunday Half Hour (1940–2018)
- Desert Island Discs (1942–Present)
- Down Your Way (1946–1992)
- Letter from America (1946–2004)
- Woman's Hour (1946–Present)
- A Book at Bedtime (1949–Present)

=== 1950s ===
- The Archers (1950–Present)
- The Today Programme (1957–Present)
- Sing Something Simple (1959–2001)
- Your Hundred Best Tunes (1959–2007)

=== 1960s ===
- Farming Today (1960–Present)
- In Touch (1961–Present)
- The World at One (1965–Present)
- The Official Chart (1967–Present)
- Just a Minute (1967–Present)
- The Living World (1968–Present)
- The Organist Entertains (1969–2018)

=== 1970s ===
- PM (1970–Present)
- Start the Week (1970–Present)
- Week Ending (1970–1998)
- You and Yours (1970–Present)
- I'm Sorry I Haven't a Clue (1972–Present)
- Good Morning Scotland (1973–Present)
- Kaleidoscope (1973–1998)
- Newsbeat (1973–Present)
- The News Huddlines (1975–2001)
- File on 4 (1977–Present)
- Money Box (1977–Present)
- The News Quiz (1977–Present)
- Breakaway (1979–1998)
- Feedback (1979–Present)
- The Food Programme (1979–Present)
- Science in Action (1979–Present)

=== 1980s ===
- Radio Active (1980–1987)

== Closing this year ==
- 6 October – Centre Radio (1981–1983)

== Births ==
- 19 January – MistaJam, born Peter Dalton, DJ
- 19 July – Helen Skelton, broadcast presenter
- 6 August
  - Kayper, DJ
  - Lloyd Langford, Welsh comedian
- 16 August – Colin Griffiths, TV presenter and DJ

== Deaths ==
- 22 February – Sir Adrian Boult, orchestral conductor, BBC director of music (born 1889)
- 11 September – Brian Lawrance, Australian-born bandleader (born 1909)
- 22 October – Sir Harold Bishop, broadcasting engineer (born 1900)
- 24 December – Alan Melville, scriptwriter and war reporter (born 1910)

== See also ==
- 1983 in British music
- 1983 in British television
- 1983 in the United Kingdom
- List of British films of 1983
