= Vicki Blight =

Welsh radio presenter

- Presenting career
- Station: Virgin Radio UK
- Previous shows: Red Dragon FM, Heart 106, Century FM, BBC Radio 1, Absolute Radio, BBC Radio Wales

Victoria Blight is a radio DJ based in the United Kingdom. Blight has presented shows on Heart 106, a regional radio station broadcast to the East Midlands, Absolute Radio, BBC Radio 1 and BBC Radio Wales. The name Blight is of Cornish origin.

== Early radio career ==
Vicki Blight was involved in student radio at Cardiff University, where she went on to win Best Female Presenter at the Radio 1 Student Radio Award in 2002.

From there, she became a presenter on Red Dragon FM, a commercial radio station based in South Wales, in 2003. After graduating, she joined independent station Century FM.

== Heart 106 ==
Vicki Blight has presented various shows on Nottingham-based Heart 106, including a weekday afternoon slot and a topical phone-in show.

She has additionally presented an overnight slot and a weekend slot on the station, and, in under a year, she became the co-presenter of the breakfast show.

== BBC Radio 1 ==
In 2007, Blight was awarded with the Friday Early Breakfast slot on the station, and presented the slot for a month.

She was rumoured to be the new Radio 1 Surgery presenter on BBC Radio 1; these rumours have since been proved false when Kelly Osbourne was unveiled as the new presenter in September 2007.
