= List of British films of 1985 =

A list of films produced in the United Kingdom in 1985 (see 1985 in film):

== 1985 ==
Title	Director	Cast	Genre	Notes
1985
1919	Hugh Brody	Paul Scofield		Entered into the 35th Berlin International Film Festival
The Angelic Conversation	Derek Jarman	Paul Reynolds, Phillip Williamson	Arthouse	Shakespeare's sonnets read by Judi Dench
The Assam Garden	Mary McMurray	Deborah Kerr, Madhur Jaffrey, Alec McCowen	Drama	
Billy the Kid and the Green Baize Vampire	Alan Clarke	Phil Daniels, Bruce Payne	Musical	
Brazil	Terry Gilliam	Jonathan Pryce, Kim Greist	Fantasy	
The Bride	Franc Roddam	Sting, Jennifer Beals	Horror	
A Crime of Honour	John Goldschmidt	David Suchet, Maria Schneider	Drama	a.k.a. A Song for Europe
Dance with a Stranger	Mike Newell	Miranda Richardson, Rupert Everett	Crime	
D.A.R.Y.L.	Simon Wincer	Barret Oliver, Mary Beth Hurt	Sci-fi	
Defence of the Realm	David Drury	Gabriel Byrne, Greta Scacchi	Thriller	
Déjà Vu	Anthony B.Richmond	Jaclyn Smith, Claire Bloom, Nigel Terry, Shelley Winters		
The Doctor and the Devils	Freddie Francis	Timothy Dalton, Jonathan Pryce	Horror	
Dreamchild	Gavin Millar	Coral Browne, Ian Holm	Comedy/drama	
The Emerald Forest	John Boorman	Charley Boorman, Powers Boothe	Drama	
The Girl in the Picture	Cary Parker	John Gordon Sinclair, Gregor Fisher	Comedy/romance	
The Good Father	Mike Newell	Anthony Hopkins, Jim Broadbent	Drama	
Howling II: Stirba - Werewolf Bitch	Philippe Mora	Christopher Lee, Annie McEnroe	Horror	
Insignificance	Nicolas Roeg	Michael Emil, Theresa Russell	Drama	Entered into the 1985 Cannes Film Festival
King David	Bruce Beresford	Richard Gere, Edward Woodward, Alice Krige, Denis Quilley	Biblical epic	
Legend	Ridley Scott	Tom Cruise, Mia Sara, Tim Curry, David Bennent, Alice Playten, Billy Barty, Cork Hubbert	epic dark fantasy adventure	Co-production with the US
Letter to Brezhnev	Chris Bernard	Peter Firth, Tracy Lea	Romance/drama	
Lifeforce	Tobe Hooper	Steve Railsback, Mathilda May, Peter Firth	Sci-fi	
Morons from Outer Space	Mike Hodges	Griff Rhys Jones, Mel Smith	Sci-fi/comedy	
Mr. Love	Roy Battersby	Barry Jackson, Maurice Denham	Comedy	
Murder Elite	Claude Whatham	Ali MacGraw, Billie Whitelaw	Thriller	
My Beautiful Laundrette	Stephen Frears	Daniel Day-Lewis, Gordon Warnecke, Saeed Jaffrey, Roshan Seth	Drama	
No Surrender	Peter Smith	Michael Angelis, Avis Bunnage	Comedy	
Not Quite Paradise	Lewis Gilbert	Joanna Pacuła, Sam Robards	Romance	
Ordeal by Innocence	Desmond Davis	Donald Sutherland, Faye Dunaway	Mystery	
Plenty	Fred Schepisi	Meryl Streep, Charles Dance	Drama	
Restless Natives	Michael Hoffman	Vincent Friell, Joe Mullaney	Comedy	
Revolution	Hugh Hudson	Al Pacino, Donald Sutherland, Nastassja Kinski	Drama	
A Room with a View	James Ivory	Maggie Smith, Helena Bonham Carter, Denholm Elliott, Julian Sands	Drama	
Seacoal	Amber Film Team	Ray Stubbs, Amber Styles, Sammy Johnson	Docudrama	
The Shooting Party	Alan Bridges	James Mason, Edward Fox, Dorothy Tutin	Drama	Entered into the 14th Moscow International Film Festival
Steaming	Joseph Losey	Vanessa Redgrave, Sarah Miles, Diana Dors	Drama	Screened at the 1985 Cannes Film Festival
The Supergrass	Peter Richardson	Peter Richardson, Adrian Edmondson, Jennifer Saunders, Keith Allen, Nigel Planer, Dawn French, Ronald Allen, Daniel Peacock, Robbie Coltrane, Alexei Sayle	Comedy/crime	
Turtle Diary	John Irvin	Glenda Jackson, Ben Kingsley	Comedy/drama	
Underworld	George Pavlou	Denholm Elliott, Miranda Richardson	Horror	
A View to a Kill	John Glen	Roger Moore, Christopher Walken, Grace Jones	Spy/action	
Water	Dick Clement	Michael Caine, Valerie Perrine, Billy Connolly	Comedy	
Wetherby	David Hare	Vanessa Redgrave, Ian Holm, Tom Wilkinson	Drama	Won the Golden Bear at Berlin
Wild Geese II	Peter Hunt	Scott Glenn, Barbara Carrera, Edward Fox, Laurence Olivier	Action/drama	
A Zed & Two Noughts	Peter Greenaway	Andréa Ferréol, Brian Deacon, Joss Ackland	Drama	

== See also ==
- 1985 in British music
- 1985 in British radio
- 1985 in British television
- 1985 in the United Kingdom
