= Polly James (broadcaster) =

Welsh radio & television presenter, born 1987

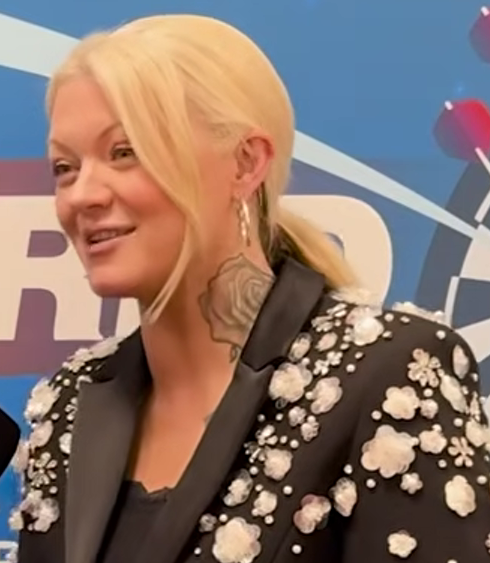
- James in 2026
- Born: 28 November 1987 (age 38); Cardiff, Wales
- Spouse: Allan Lake (2000s–2010s)
- Children: 2
- Presenting career
- Station: Radio X
- Network: Global Media & Entertainment
- Time slot: Weekend afternoons (2019–present)
- Station: Capital South Wales
- Network: Capital (radio network)
- Time slot: Weekday Breakfast (–2019)
- Country: United Kingdom

Polly James (formerly Polly Lake; born 1986 or 1987) is a Welsh radio and television presenter. She has presented for Absolute Radio, Radio X, and Capital South Wales. She has been a television sports broadcaster, covering darts for Sky Sports, as well as the Late Night Football Club, BBC One's chat show for the duration of Wales' participation in the 2022 FIFA World Cup.

== Background ==
James was born in Cardiff, Wales, and lived in Llanishen, Rhiwbina and Thornhill in the city and then Penarth. She attended Stanwell Comprehensive in Penarth. She competed for Wales and GB Juniors in athletics at an underage level.

== Career ==
James starting broadcasting in community radio stations like Afan FM, and Bridge FM. After working for Nation Radio Wales, she presented an overnight show on Absolute Radio in the early 2010's, moving to Capital South Wales in 2013. During Capital's restructuring in 2019, her Capital South Wales breakfast show (with Matt Lissack) was cancelled and she moved to Radio X. It was later nominated for Breakfast Show of the year.

She presented for Radio X Friday and Saturday nights in 2019. She has covered darts, rugby, football and boxing as a sports broadcaster, and presented for Unibet on social media.

== Personal life ==
James married fellow presenter Allan Lake and they founded a production company, Plush Productions, together in 2011. They divorced in the 2010s. She has one daughter and one son. In August 2018, her discovery of a homeless person sleeping on her porch made national headlines, and she rented out the property, with its unusual art collection (giant sheep, shark head, paintings by Ronnie Wood, a statue of Freddy Krueger and a door mural of Tom Jones in his underwear) in 2019.

She has spoken out against social media trolls, and in favour of Welsh independence.
