= List of British films of 1983 =

Films list

A list of films produced in the United Kingdom in 1983 (see 1983 in film):

== 1983 ==
Title	Director	Cast	Genre	Notes
1983
Another Time, Another Place	Michael Radford	Phyllis Logan, Denise Coffey	Drama	
Ascendancy	Edward Bennett	Julie Covington, Ian Charleson	Drama	Won the Golden Bear at Berlin
Betrayal	David Jones	Jeremy Irons, Patricia Hodge, Ben Kingsley	Drama	Harold Pinter based his screenplay on his 1978 semi-autobiographical play.
Biddy	Christine Edzard	Celia Bannerman, Sam Ghazoros	Period drama	
Bloodbath at the House of Death	Ray Cameron	Kenny Everett, Pamela Stephenson, Vincent Price	Horror	
Bullshot	Dick Clement	Alan Shearman, Diz White	Comedy	
Champions	John Irvin			Entered into the 34th Berlin International Film Festival
The Crimson Permanent Assurance	Terry Gilliam	Sydney Arnold, Guy Bertrand, John Scott Martin	Short	Shown as a lead in to Monty Python's The Meaning of Life
Curse of the Pink Panther	Blake Edwards	David Niven, Joanna Lumley, Burt Kwouk, Herbert Lom, Ted Wass	Comedy	
Dead on Time	Lyndall Hobbs	Rowan Atkinson, Nigel Hawthorne	Comedy	
The Dresser	Peter Yates	Albert Finney, Tom Courtenay, Eileen Atkins	Drama	
Educating Rita	Lewis Gilbert	Michael Caine, Julie Walters	Drama	
Eureka	Nicolas Roeg	Gene Hackman, Theresa Russell	Thriller	Co-production with the US
Fanny Hill	Gerry O'Hara	Lisa Foster, Oliver Reed	Sex Comedy	
Funny Money	James Kenelm Clarke	Gregg Henry, Elizabeth Daily	Drama	
The Gold Diggers	Sally Potter	George Antoni, Julie Christie	Drama	
Heat and Dust	James Ivory	Julie Christie, Greta Scacchi, Shashi Kapoor	Drama	Entered into the 1983 Cannes Film Festival
The Honorary Consul	John Mackenzie	Michael Caine, Richard Gere, Bob Hoskins	Thriller	
House of the Long Shadows	Pete Walker	Vincent Price, Christopher Lee	Horror	
The Hunger	Tony Scott	Catherine Deneuve, David Bowie, Susan Sarandon	Horror	
Invitation to the Wedding	Joseph Brooks	Ralph Richardson, John Gielgud	Comedy	
The Jigsaw Man	Terence Young	Michael Caine, Laurence Olivier	Spy/thriller	
Krull	Peter Yates	Ken Marshall, Lysette Anthony	Adventure	
Local Hero	Bill Forsyth	Peter Riegert, Denis Lawson, Burt Lancaster	Comedy/drama	
Merry Christmas, Mr. Lawrence	Nagisa Oshima	David Bowie, Tom Conti, Ryuichi Sakamoto	World War II/POW	Entered into the 1983 Cannes Film Festival
Monty Python's The Meaning of Life	Terry Jones	The members of Monty Python, Carol Cleveland, Simon Jones, Patricia Quinn	Comedy/musical	Last film for the Monty Python troupe
Nelly's Version	Maurice Branton	Eileen Atkins and Anthony Bate	Mystery film	
Never Say Never Again	Irvin Kershner	Sean Connery, Kim Basinger, Klaus Maria Brandauer	Spy	
El Norte	Gregory Nava	Zaide Silvia Gutiérrez, David Villalpando	Drama	Made with the US
Octopussy	John Glen	Roger Moore, Louis Jourdan, Maud Adams, Kristina Wayborn	Spy/action	
The Pirates of Penzance	Wilford Leach	Kevin Kline, Angela Lansbury	Comedy/musical	
The Ploughman's Lunch	Richard Eyre	Jonathan Pryce, Tim Curry, Rosemary Harris	Drama	
Runners	Charles Sturridge	Kate Hardie, James Fox, Jane Asher	Drama	
Scrubbers	Mai Zetterling	Amanda York, Chrissie Cotterill	Drama	
Secrets	Peter Sasdy	John Castle, Barbara Kellerman	Comedy	
Slayground	Terry Bedford	Peter Coyote, Mel Smith	Action	
Superman III	Richard Lester	Christopher Reeve, Richard Pryor	Adventure	Co-production with the US
Where Is Parsifal?	Henri Helman	Tony Curtis, Donald Pleasence, Orson Welles	Comedy	
The Wicked Lady	Michael Winner	Faye Dunaway, Alan Bates	Drama	
The Wind in the Willows	Mark Hall; Chris Taylor	Richard Pearson, Ian Carmichael, David Jason and Michael Hordern	Animated	
Xtro	Harry Bromley Davenport	Philip Sayer, Maryam d'Abo, Simon Nash	Horror	
Yellowbeard	Mel Damski	Graham Chapman, Peter Boyle	Comedy	

== See also ==
- 1983 in British music
- 1983 in British radio
- 1983 in British television
- 1983 in the United Kingdom
