= Jason Harrold =

Welsh radio presenter

Jason 'Jase' Harrold is a Welsh radio presenter, who presented the popular Red Dragon FM radio show 'The Full Welsh Breakfast' until 2008.

Sidekicks on Breakfast at Reddragon:

- Jase & Bobby (McVay)
- Jase & Emma (Higgnett)
- Jase & Zoe (Hanson)
- Jase & Ali (Crocker)
- Jase & Mel (Knight)
- Guest presenters, including Lucy Owen (now BBC Wales Today presenter)

== Biography ==
Before working for Red Dragon FM, Harrold hosted the breakfast show on Radio Wyvern, serving Hereford and Worcester. Harrold worked at Red Dragon for 16 years, with the bulk of those years spent presenting the morning, or 'breakfast', show. In 2008, he was moved from Breakfast to presenting weekday evenings from 8pm - midnight but this only lasted a couple of months after which he presented his last ever show at the station in August of the same year.

In 2009 Harrold joined Real Radio Wales to host on weekends, and also covered the breakfast show on various occasions. He presented the breakfast show on Real Radio with Angela Jay following the departure of Tony Wright from January to April 2010 until a replacement was announced. He moved from weekends to weekday Mid-Mornings in April 2011 following a schedule shake-up. In October 2012 it was announced that Real Radio were to introduce networked daytimes from their base at Real Radio North West, this resulted in another schedule shake-up meaning Harrold moving from Weekday Mid-Mornings to Weekday Drivetime replacing long-standing drivetime presenter Dave Brookes.

In 2014, it was announced that Real Radio Wales was to be sold to Global Radio and rebranded as part of the Heart (radio network). Harrold continued to present the Weekday Drivetime show between the syndicated shows, hosted by Matt Wilkinson and Neil 'Roberto' Williams.

Harrold has also freelanced for both Star Radio and BBC Radio in Bristol and Somerset.

Before joining Red Dragon, Harrold was a baker at a supermarket. He is married and has a stepdaughter and a son.
