= Skywhales =

- Directed by: Phil Austin and Derek Hayes
- Written by: Phil Austin and Derek Hayes
- Produced by: Channel 4
- Starring: Robert Llewellyn; Bernard Evans
- Edited by: Lesley Manning
- Music by: Dirk Higgins
- Distributed by: Animation City; Channel 4
- Release date: 19 August 1983
- Running time: 11 min.
- Country: United Kingdom
- Language: Fictional

Skywhales is a 1983 British animated drama short film by Derek Hayes and Phil Austin that depicts a fictional society of alien creatures dwelling in the atmosphere of a gas giant. The film is noted for the completeness of its depiction of a fictitious society, including alien language, flora, fauna and social structures and practices. The film has since become a cult classic.

== Story ==
The story begins with a man warning the tribe of approaching skywhales. Drummers warn everybody of the hunt as everyone get prepared to set "sail". One man is found in his home sleeping as the noise wakes him up. He gets ready and is about to take his weapon as he hesitates then decides to go. As he leaves his room, his wife and child see him and try stopping him. He goes through the forest with strange fauna and flora and stops at a path as he sees old pale natives head into a strange silver building. As a sign of respect, he shields his eyes. He is then surprised when his wife pokes him and says that she's coming. As he enters the ship, he sees a native wearing the captain's hat but then he takes his rightful hat while the other looks surprised he came. Then they go on a hunt for the whale. The audience is shown that they live on a floating island high up in a gas giant. The hunters go far away from their home and stop when they hear the whale. Everything is still until a skywhale comes and then destroys the main character's ship. They parachute down to the wife's ship and follow one of the two whales which have escaped. The main character harpoons its head and is congratulated by his team. As it dies they bring it back to their island home where it is completely butchered by nightfall. It then shows the main character and his family at the port where the wife is talking to the son and the main character is tying a rope. Suddenly he turns pale and his eyes black. The wife immediately recognizes what he has become and adopts the custom of shielding her eyes and his son soon follows. By instinct, the main character heads to the building where all those who reach the point in their life to mature go. In the building, there are four guards and a giant hole in the center. Skywhale drawings are all over the floor. As the guards cover their eyes and the wife and son watch at the doorway, he stands there for a while and then falls in the hole. The son gasps and tries to enter but the wife stops him. He looks confused and as they leave, he asks something to the wife who then begins to explain it to him. They show the main character falling through the roots of the island as a cocoon starts forming around his body. By sunrise, he is completely enclosed and hatches as a juvenile skywhale. The viewer then sees the wife with the main character's spear explaining something to the son. Suddenly he hears a skywhale's call, takes the spear, and points it to the whale which he immediately recognizes is his father. The two of them then stand there staring as the whale flies away into the sunrise with the son saluting it with his father's spear. The end credits appear with primitive skywhale cave-drawings in the background.

== World ==
The story concerns a tribal society of mohawked green-skinned creatures who speak in a complex language of hoots. The hoots are not subtitled, leaving the viewer to determine the meaning from visual context alone. They are intelligent, having a small port with three ships, a small town, clothes, musical instruments and metal weapons and armour. One significant tribal custom introduced early on is the appearance of a subset of the population with dead white skin color and dark black eyes; encountering them causes the people to shield their eyes and let them pass, suggesting an advanced culture. It soon becomes apparent that the society lives in the atmosphere on flying islands, and use pedalled, flying wooden craft to hunt large winged creatures, the skywhales of the title. The creatures have a ship with gas-filled balloons keeping it afloat and it is powered by pedal turning a propeller. The hunters are totally still as they hear the creature. If the skywhales break their ship, they have special gas-filled parachutes that prevent them from falling as another ship comes to their aid. They hunt by using a harpoon on the underside of their ship, which is driven by one of the natives towards its head. Once the skywhale is impaled, the others use a rope to bring it back. Once they return, the natives use every part of the whales. It seems that either the natives get sick or that they are actually larvae of the skywhale, because after the hunt, they develop pale skin and dark black eyes and then go to a building deep in the forest. As a sign of respect, people shield their eyes once they spot one of them. Once inside the building, they stand in front of a giant hole and fall down through the roots of the floating island. While falling, the natives turn into cocoons and hatch only a few hours later into juvenile skywhales. The floating island resembles intestines by the orange roots coming from the underside. The forest on top is orange and contains strange flora that look like trees. Some giant bags of gas are also present. Their buildings are silver and dome-shaped with other complicated structures. On the inside, cave drawings of skywhales cover the walls and floors (it may be that they believe that they are the spirits of their ancestors which of course is partially true).

== Reception ==
The Washington Post stated that it was "no different from the usual Saturday morning fare" while The Chicago Tribune compared it to the sci-fi works of Ralph Bakshi.

The Morning Call called it a "Disneyesque fantasy, combing elements of Star Wars and Moby Dick".
