= Doris (TV series) =

British animated children's television series

- Genre: Children's television
- Created by: Hilary Hayton
- Directed by: Hilary Hayton
- Country of origin: United Kingdom
- Original language: English
- No. of episodes: 37

Production
- Animators: Peter Lang; Martin Wansborough
- Editor: Robin McDonell
- Running time: 5 minutes
- Production company: Yorkshire Television

Original release
- Network: ITV
- Release: 5 September 1983 – 15 November 1985

Doris is a British animated children's television series created by Hilary Hayton, creator of Crystal Tipps and Alistair. This programme is produced by Yorkshire Television. Every episode is 5 minutes long.

== Background ==
The programme was animated in a similar way to Hayton's previous work using cut-out images against patterned backdrops. Doris herself was a black and white cat, who had several cat friends, especially Marlon, the cat from next door. Doris was broadcast in the mid-1980s on ITV, though had very little merchandise. Rosie & Ruff in Puppydog Tales, a series which had a similar look to Doris, which was broadcast in the early 1990s.

== Episodes ==
- An Adventure with Marlon (05.09.1983)
- Introducing Leo (06.09.1983)
- Poor Doris (07.09.1983)
- Marlon Learns to Ski (08.09.1983)
- Home Help (09.09.1983)
- Gardening with Marlon (12.09.1983)
- Bake a Cake (13.09.1983)
- A Visit from Spacecat (14.09.1983)
- Fruitful Dreams (15.09.1983)
- The Fancy Dress Party (16.09.1983)
- Marlon's Birthday (19.09.1983)
- A Visit from Coolcat (20.09.1983)
- Marlon and the Snowcat (21.09.1983)
- Swops (22.09.1983)
- The Butterflies (23.09.1983)
- Marlon Goes Camping (26.09.1983)
- The Sound of Music (27.09.1983)
- Charley's Magic Planet (28.09.1983)
- Keep Fit (29.09.1983)
- The Birthday Party (30.09.1983)
- Music While You Work (23.09.1985)
- Jungle Cats (24.09.1985)
- Hide and Shriek (25.09.1985)
- A Tall Story (26.09.1985)
- Dream Boat (27.09.1985)
- The Black Hole (30.09.1985)
- Catfish (01.10.1985)
- Clockwork Oranges (02.10.1985)
- Rastacat (03.10.1985)
- Bad Manners (04.10.1985)
- Marlon's Time Machine (04.11.1985)
- Buzz (05.11.1985)
- Minki Magicat (06.11.1985)
- What a Bunch (07.11.1985)
- Cavecat Meets Spacecat (08.11.1985)
- Naughty Doris (14.11.1985)
- Santa Claws (15.11.1985)

== Crew ==
- Devised and Directed by Hilary Hayton
- Animation: Peter Lang / Martin Wansborough
- Production Assistant: Fiona Dickson
- Music & Sound Effects: Derek Wadsworth & Dave Lawson
- Editor: Robin McDonell
- Dubbing Mixer: Steve Haynes
