= Celtica Radio =

Radio station in Bridgend, Wales

- Wales
- Broadcast area: Worldwide

Programming
- Format: Various Contemporary, New and Unsigned music

Ownership
- Owner: AlBilCo MediaComm Ltd

History
- First air date: 21 June 2000

Links
- Website: celticaradio.com

Celtica Radio International is an independent commercial radio station which uses the Internet as its transmission platform broadcasting in MP3 format. The station has its head office based in Bridgend, Wales, and provides a broad mix of programming available worldwide in live, on-demand and downloadable formats. Celtica Radio started broadcasting on 21 June 2000, and is still in the same ownership. In the year 2012 Celtica Radio logged over one and three-quarter million listeners, and achieved over 54,000 podcast downloads. Since November 2012, around 300,000 listeners a month tune into Celtica Radio.

On 23 April 2011, the station started broadcasting through the transmitters of Radio Hafren on 756 kHz medium wave, until 10 February 2015, when Radio Hafren closed. The broadcasts were for two hours per night, every night from Midnight to 2 AM local time. Distance or DX listeners who provided a reception report were sent by return of post a QSL card.

Radio Hafren began FM broadcasts on 102.1 MHz FM at 10:21 am on Monday 11 August 2014. Celtica Radio programmes on that frequency started at Midnight on Tuesday 12 August.

== History ==
The Celtica Radio story goes back to 1979 when a small group of people in the Bridgend area of South Wales wanted to set up their own wholly independent radio station. Over the following eighteen years the evolution of the group continued, with the establishment of two hospital radio stations in Bridgend and Neath, the re-launch of broadcasting at Swansea University, and two trial broadcasts in 1997 and 1998, culminating in a successful campaign to persuade the licensing authorities that the Bridgend region and community deserved its own local radio station. Leading this group of committed local radio enthusiasts and professionals was Bill Everatt.

The UK Radio Authority (which has now been replaced by OfCom) did not give that group the chance of broadcasting to their home area. This decision had the effect of stiffening the resolve of those who had been denied this local radio station licence, and led to David A Cook who had also worked on the campaign, providing the initial financial investment to set up Celtica Radio and its parent company AlBilCo MediaComm. Initially, the business structure was as an unincorporated association, but in 2003, both Celtica Radio and AlBilCo MediaComm became registered limited companies. The station has now expanded and the original group of broadcasters has been joined by others from other parts of the UK and Europe.

From 2005 to 2008, John Grierson, the founder and first general manager of Manx Radio, the Isle of Mans national commercial radio station, also broadcast with and advised the group.

== Location ==
The Celtica Radio Group is mainly based in South Wales, and makes programmes from a matrix of nine purpose-built, private studios. Many Celtica Radio contributors are established broadcasters, and have acknowledged track records in the radio industry. All key personnel are experts in their particular field of audio production, broadcasting or radio-related engineering.

The station's servers are located at the Red Bus Data Centre at the prestigious Canary Wharf development in London. The station is an official Partner organisation of Bridgend County Borough Council Arts and Culture Directorate.

== Airplay ==
Celtica Radio are not members of PRS, MCPS, PPL or any of their foreign affiliates. All the music the station transmits is out of the jurisdiction of any of the above organisations. Artists who contact the station for promotional airplay will need to visit the Playlists page and agree to the terms and conditions.

All shows are downloadable as Free Podcasts and also available on iTunes, and the programmes are usually over an hour in duration. In July 2007, Celtica Radio started being listed on the Reciva Internet Radio Network which allows their broadcasts to be heard without a PC for the first time.

From September 2008 to December 2008, certain programmes were broadcast on the English Language service of Radio Waddenzee. The broadcasts were transmitted late at night and took advantage of groundwave propagation and skywave refraction off the ionosphere. These characteristics ensured that the broadcasts could be received throughout Central Europe and the East Coast of the UK on 1602 kHz Medium Wave. The station identified itself as Celtica Radio, broadcasting from the Lightship Jenni Baynton through the transmitters of Radio Seagull.

Due to significant developments with the company’s financial backers in November 2009, the station launched a live internet streaming service of original programming twenty-fours hour a day from their own studios, this channel also has a low bitrate multi-media feed which can be received on all smart phones. The exact nature of the financial development has not been made public.
