= Capital South Wales =

- Cardiff; United Kingdom
- Broadcast area: South East Wales
- Frequencies: DAB: 12C NOW SE Wales; FM: 97.4 MHz Newport; FM: 103.2 MHz Cardiff; RDS: Capital
- Branding: South Wales' No.1 Hit Music Station

Programming
- Format: Contemporary hit radio
- Network: Capital

Ownership
- Owner: Communicorp UK
- Operator: Global Radio
- Sister stations: Capital Cymru; Capital Liverpool; Capital Manchester and Lancashire; Capital Mid-Counties; Capital Midlands; Capital North East; Capital North West and Wales; Capital Scotland; Capital South; Capital Yorkshire; Capital UK; Capital Xtra; Heart South Wales

History
- First air date: 11 April 1980
- Former names: CBC (Cardiff Broadcasting Company) (1980–1985); Red Dragon Radio (1985–1990); Red Dragon FM (1990–2011)
- Former frequencies: 96.0 MHz; 104.0 MHz; 1359 kHz; 1305 kHz

Links
- Webcast: Global Player
- Website: www.capitalfm.com/southwales/

Capital South Wales is a regional radio station owned by Communicorp UK and operated by Global as part of the Capital network. It broadcasts to South East Wales from studios in Cardiff.

== History ==
Red Dragon displayed on a RDS car radio

The station originally took to the air in Cardiff only. Known as CBC (Cardiff Broadcasting Company), the station launched on 11 April 1980 on broadcasting on 96.0 MHz FM and 1359 kHz AM. Following the closure of neighbouring Gwent Broadcasting in April 1985, CBC began relaying its service as a temporary measure to southern Gwent on 104.0 MHz FM and 1305 kHz AM. This became permanent when CBC re-launched as Red Dragon Radio on 14 October 1985. Initially, there were separate drive time shows for Glamorgan and Gwent, but these were dropped for a single service by the early 1990s.

Simulcasting on 1305 kHz and 1359 kHz AM ended in 1990, with the launch of Touch AM.

On 3 January 2011, the station was rebranded from Red Dragon FM to Capital South Wales as part of a merger of owners Global's Hit Music and Galaxy networks to form the Capital FM network. On 6 February 2014, Global Radio announced it would be selling Capital South Wales to Communicorp. Capital's network programming and brand name are retained under a franchise agreement. Global's Heart South Wales station shares facilities at the Capital studios in Cardiff Bay.

On 26 February 2019, Global confirmed the station's local breakfast and weekend shows would be replaced with networked programming from April 2019. The weekday drivetime show was retained alongside news bulletins, traffic updates and advertising.

In January 2025, it was reported that Capital Cymru would cease all of its Welsh language programming following the broadcast regulator Ofcom's decision to relax local content obligations for commercial radio, apart from news. The station's Wrexham studios will also close.

As of 24 February 2025, the station's weekday Drivetime show, presented by Josh Andrews and Kally Davies, is simulcast on Capital's stations in the North West and North Wales. Separate local news and traffic bulletins for South Wales were retained.

== Coverage area ==
Initially, CBC broadcast to Cardiff on 96.0 MHz and Newport on 104.0 MHz FM. These frequencies were switched to 103.2 MHz and 97.4 MHz respectively in 1987, following a national reorganisation of UK FM frequencies.

The 103.2 MHz signal, which is the stronger of the two, originally broadcast from the transmitter at Wenallt near Cardiff, with the 97.4 MHz signal being transmitted from Christchurch in Newport. The signals reach as far out as the South Wales Valleys to the north and part of Bridgend to the west.

In 2026, the 103.2 MHz signal moved to the larger Wenvoe transmitting station to the west of Cardiff.

Capital South Wales also broadcasts on the NOW Digital South East Wales DAB multiplex and online.

== Programming ==
All networked programming originates from Global's London headquarters, including Capital Breakfast. Local programming is produced and broadcast from Global's Cardiff Bay studios from 4-7pm, presented by Josh Andrews and Kally Davies.

=== News ===
Global's Newsroom broadcasts hourly regional news updates from 5am-7pm on weekdays and 8am-12 midday at weekends.

The bulletins are produced for Communicorp by Global's Cardiff Bay newsroom, which also produces bulletins for Heart South Wales, Heart North and Mid Wales and Smooth Wales.

== Former presenters ==
- Chris Ashley (now at Celtica Radio)
- Bill Everatt (now at Celtica Radio)
- Vicki Blight
- Sacha Brooks (now at Capital XTRA Reloaded)
- Rich Clarke (now at Heart South)
- Andi Durrant (now at Kisstory)
- Carl Emms (now at Heart 70s)
- Jason Harrold (now at Smooth Wales)
- Polly James (now at Radio X)
- Dave Kelly
- Phil Kennedy
- Bobby McVay
- Matt Spokes
- Gareth James
- Damien St. John
- Mike Parker
- Vaughan Roderick (now at BBC Radio Wales and BBC Radio Cymru)
- Noel Sullivan
