= Pirate Radio Four =

Children's magazine show by BBC Radio 4

Pirate Radio Four was a magazine show broadcast on the VHF/FM frequencies of BBC Radio 4 in 1985 and 1986. Part of the station's drive to attract younger listeners, it was broadcast during the mornings in the school summer holidays and was aimed at children of about 8–14 years old. It also had a sister programme, Cat's Whiskers, aimed at younger listeners.

The show was noted for featuring a new Doctor Who serial, Slipback, during its first run, and also featured regular appearances by Sue Townsend's character Adrian Mole.

Two series of three programmes were broadcast. In 1985 the programme aired throughout the morning, from 9:05 am until 12noon whereas the 1986 series ended at the earlier time of 10:45 am.

The host was Steve Blacknell.
