= John Bee =

British theatre organist

- Born: 30 December 1895; Lincoln, England
- Died: 24 September 1983 (aged 87)
- Occupation: Musician
- Instrument: Organ
- Military career
- Allegiance: United Kingdom
- Branch: British Army
- Rank: Lieutenant
- Units: 19th Yorkshire Regiment, 1st West Yorkshire Regiment
- Awards: Military Cross

John Robert Bee (30 December 1895 – 24 September 1983) was a British theatre organist who held solo positions at the Haymarket Theatre, Norwich, and The New Gaumont, Worcester. He broadcast regularly for the BBC in the 1930s and 1940s and toured extensively playing organ recitals in later life, being known as one of the 'Old Timers' of British theatre organists. His theme tune was ‘The Honeysuckle And The Bee’.

== Biography ==
=== Early life ===
Bee was born in Lincoln on 30 December 1895. He showed talent as a young child, and studied with local piano teacher Rosa Sparkes and later with Gertrude Foster, the principal of Lincoln College of Music. He showed an aptitude to be able to play pieces of classical music by ear, and was performing piano recitals in public by the age of 13.

Bee studied organ under Harry Trevitt FRCO, at Lincoln Cathedral, and practised on the three manual organ at the Wesley Chapel, Clasketgate, Lincoln, also known as ‘Big Wesley’. He was appointed organist there whilst still at school, and held the position for some years. At this time he performed in recitals with the choirmaster Charles Elvin, and deputised at local cinemas during the school holidays.

=== First World War ===
Bee trained for a commission and served with the 19th Yorkshire Regiment and the 1st West Yorkshire Regiment. He attained the rank of Lieutenant, and whilst in France was injured by a shell and buried by the blast. He was taken as a prisoner of war to the Mainz Prison Camp where he helped to write and produce camp shows with Maurice Besly and Milton Hayes. On his return to England he found that he had been awarded the Military Cross, with which he was later decorated.

=== Interwar period ===
Bee returned to civilian life managing a music shop and playing concerts in Lincolnshire. He was solo pianist and accompanist for the Lincoln Musical Society, performing such works as the Grieg piano concerto. After the general strike of 1926 he was appointed assistant organist to Felton Rapley at The Regent, Hanley, for the Gaumont Picture Corporation. He was subsequently appointed as organist at The Coliseum, Burslem, and then at The Haymarket Theatre, Norwich where he remained until 1935. In 1935 he took up the position of organist at the Gaumont Palace, Worcester, playing for the Grand Opening on 28 October 1935.

Bee gave his first broadcast for the BBC in 1936. He regularly gave broadcasts from the Gaumont Palace, Birmingham; the Gaumont Worcester and from St George’s Hall, London up to the outbreak of war in 1939.

=== Second World War ===
Bee continued as organist at The Gaumont, Worcester at the outbreak of World War II. He regularly broadcast throughout the war from there, from the Gaumont Palace, Birmingham, and from the BBC wartime headquarters at Wood Norton, Evesham. Programmes included ‘Music While You Work’, the Forces Programme, the Home Service Programme and Regional Programmes. He also gave public concerts at The Tower Ballroom, Blackpool, and the Queens Cinema, Newcastle upon Tyne.

=== Post-Second World War ===
Following World War II, Bee went into cinema management and became Manager at the Gaumont, Worcester in 1949, and then at the New Odeon Cinema, Worcester in 1950. In 1952 he was awarded a Certificate of Honorary Life Membership of the Kinematograph Weekly Company of Showmen. He retired from cinema management in 1962.

Bee performed regularly from the 1950s to the 1980s. He played many concerts and recitals nationally, including a recital at Worcester Cathedral in 1956, at the invitation of the cathedral organist Sir David Willcocks, and a televised appearance at the opening of the Wurlitzer organ at the Town Hall, Burton on Trent in 1973. Other venues he performed at include The Pavilion, Bath; The Odeon, Leicester Square, London; The Odeon, Weston-super-Mare; The Regal, Edmonton; The Gaumont, Dudley; The Odeon, Manchester and The Odeon, Birmingham. Bee made occasional broadcasts on the BBC programme ‘The Organist Entertains’ in the 1970s. He was appointed organist at Worcester Crematorium in 1970 and maintained an active teaching schedule.

== Selected compositions ==
- Shoulders Square – Mayfair Music Co 1940
- Variations on Cwm Rhondda

== Selected recordings ==
- Bee Line - Concert Recording - CR-73304-S-A
- The Theatre Organ Club Presents John Bee At The Wurlitzer Organ (1985) - CLC 8517
