= Finders Keepers (1981 game show) =

- Genre: Children's Game show
- Presented by: Richard Stilgoe
- Country of origin: United Kingdom
- Original language: English
- No. of series: 5
- No. of episodes: 42

Production
- Running time: 25 minutes

Original release
- Network: BBC1
- Release: 13 February 1981 – 1 March 1985

Finders Keepers is a British children's game show television series that aired on BBC1 from 13 February 1981 to 1 March 1985, hosted by Richard Stilgoe.

== Format ==
The show combined a quiz element with a computerised version of the game Battleships. Two teams of three primary school-aged pupils would compete against each other. On scoring a "hit" at the Battleships game, the team had to answer a question to gain the associated points.

== Theme ==
The show was notable for host Richard Stilgoe playing the theme on a synthesiser live in the studio at the beginning, as well as the use of the phonetic alphabet to indicate the square on the battleship grid.

== Transmissions ==
Series	Start date	End date	Episodes
1	13 February 1981	3 April 1981	8
2	19 February 1982	2 April 1982	7
3	25 February 1983	1 April 1983	6
4	9 January 1984	26 March 1984	12
5	4 January 1985	1 March 1985	9

The series was a victim of the BBC's wiping of their children's programming in the 1990s. 28 out of 42 episodes survive in the BBC archives. The surviving episodes are:

Series 1: Episodes 1 and 4; Series 2: Episodes 1–2 and 4; Series 3: Episodes 1 and 4–6; Series 4: Episodes 1–6, 8 and 10–12. Series 5 exists in its entirety
