= Gwent Broadcasting =

Radio station in Newport, Wales (1983–1985)

- Newport; Wales
- Frequencies: 1305 kHz; 104.0 MHz

Ownership
- Owner: Gwent Area Broadcasting Ltd

History
- First air date: 13 June 1983
- Last air date: 24 April 1985 (1 year, 315 days)

Gwent Broadcasting (also known on air as GB Radio) was an Independent Local Radio (ILR) station based in Newport, in south Wales. It broadcast from 13 June 1983 to 24 April 1985. The smallest ILR station in Britain during its existence, it struggled to overcome initial debts and a slowdown in the radio advertising market. Attempts to merge outright with Cardiff Broadcasting Company (CBC), the ILR station in Cardiff, failed to garner sufficient support from that station's shareholders; while these attempts dragged on, the station folded. After one month off the air, with the approval of the Independent Broadcasting Authority and unions, CBC provided an interim sustaining service for the Newport area, broadcast from the transmitters previously used by Gwent Broadcasting. Both stations, each facing their own financial difficulties, were taken over by Red Rose Radio of Lancashire and relaunched as one service, Red Dragon Radio, on 14 October 1985.

== Franchising and construction ==
In 1981, the Independent Broadcasting Authority (IBA) advertised a licence to provide Independent Local Radio (ILR) service in the Newport area. By June 1981, three groups had submitted proposals to the IBA: Radio Gwent Ltd and the Gwent Broadcasting Trust; Isca Radio; and Radio Newport. Radio Gwent's application was backed by the Gwent Broadcasting Trust, itself the successor to an earlier community-based group that had sought a local station. The South Wales Argus owned a minority interest in Isca. From the start, the financial viability of the Newport station came into question. Isca's director, Richard Harris, cautioned that the new station would not be "a licence to print money", serving an estimated 224,000 people. The Gwent Broadcasting Trust split in July, with the splinter group continuing as Gwent Area Broadcasting (GAB) while the existing trust backed the Isca bid; and it was alleged that one group had used the other's research in preparing their bid.

The IBA awarded the franchise to Gwent Area Broadcasting in a decision announced on 17 November 1981. Isca, the losing applicant, ascribed its defeat to the financial package it offered. The Gwent Broadcasting Trust expressed its disappointment at having the splinter group, which it claimed used much of its original research, win out over them.

The pre-launch period for Gwent Broadcasting was marked by several delays as well as a struggle to raise the necessary capital. The company had planned to start broadcasting first on 1 March 1983 and then in April 1983, but this was pushed back successively to May and then to June. By the start of April 1983, Gwent Broadcasting were 30 per cent behind their goal of raising £225,000. Money was raised from district councils in the form of loans.

Gwent Broadcasting began programme service on 13 June 1983 with a 13-hour broadcast day. The service was broadcast on 1305 kHz and 104.0 MHz; Gwent was the first station assigned to the 102–104 MHz sub-band that had recently been released for radio use. The IBA transmitter site—co-located for medium wave and FM—was above a farm in the village of Christchurch; its service did not reach some areas of Gwent, particularly in the north. Primary competition for ILR listeners included Radio Wyvern from Worcester and Severn Sound of Gloucester, whose signals reached part of the Newport area.

The station went on the air in spite of its financial shortfall, despite IBA contract specifications that required new franchisees to be "fully and adequately capitalised". To save money, it leased most of its equipment and had a prefabricated studio built, the first of its kind in the ILR system. To save money, tape players that were known to struggle to meet IBA broadcast standards were modified to resolve problems. By the time of launch, shareholders included the Argus; the Industrial and Commercial Finance Corporation; and Ray Tindle, the single largest shareholder with a 10.44% holding.

== CBC merger attempt ==
In the year after launch, several key managers left Gwent Broadcasting. Managing director Russ Stuart departed in late 1983 to help start Radio Broadland in Norfolk. Within a week in June 1984, the station lost chairman Mike Hughes and programme director Mike Joseph alongside the news editor, the chief engineer and the music librarian; the departure of Joseph was particularly surprising as the station had achieved an audience share of 36%, seen by Broadcast as "respectable". During this time, rumours began to circulate of a merger between Gwent Broadcasting and Cardiff Broadcasting Company (CBC), the ILR station in Cardiff. When the franchise was awarded, the IBA recommended that the station discuss a relationship with CBC for programming. The first rumours circulated in April 1984, leading to a walkout of Gwent station staff in May. By June 1984, both stations were discussing a possible combination of management and support services. Both stations were under their own financial pressures: CBC had made losses from the moment it started. While Gwent had made money in its opening months, high interest rates increased the cost of debt servicing on the loans it had to take out to sign on; advertising trading figures began to decline in January 1984 and did not meet sales targets again. CBC was unable to finance the merger with bank loans, causing the first talks to fall apart.

In October 1984, Gwent and CBC agreed in principle to a merger. One of the principal obstacles in the merger was the structure of CBC. Half of its voting rights, though only two per cent of its financial stake, was held by the Cardiff Radio Trust, in which shares were sold for 3p each. With the merger pending, several of the councils cut the interest rates on their loans to give Gwent Broadcasting additional financial flexibility. Other problems included the structure of the merger, which at one point was understood to require every single one of the 350 CBC shareholders to assent under the government scheme by which both firms had been set up. Even though this was later lowered by an Inland Revenue waiver to 90 per cent, at which threshold CBC could have enacted a compulsory buyout of the remaining shares, only 86 per cent so far had assented to the merger. In the meantime, ILR as a whole faced declining revenue in the first months of 1985, and several stations faced financial trouble.

In spite of the lack of final assent, new merger plans were sent out in March 1985, outlining a combined company known as Cardiff and Gwent Broadcasting (to be known as CGB Radio on-air) and a structure under which CBC would become a subsidiary of Gwent.

== Shutdown, sustaining service, and Red Rose Radio purchase ==
By late April 1985, the stations had arranged a joint evening programme, extending both stations' operating hours, and pooled their sales operations. However, Gwent Broadcasting could not remain afloat amid difficulties in arranging the merger as well as increasing weekly losses.

At 11 am on 24 April 1985, GB Radio closed down with the same song it had started with in 1983, "Good Day Sunshine": the Western Daily Press reported that it was followed by the Welsh national anthem, but that claim was later negated by the station's final announcer, Colin Briggs. Twenty employees lost their jobs. It was the second ILR station to leave the air entirely after Centre Radio in Leicester.

In the wake of the collapse, entertainer Bryn Yemm ruled out a rescue bid, while CBC prepared a proposal to use six former Gwent Broadcasting employees to broadcast a sustaining service in the Newport area. CBC's chairman, Thomas Shepherd, warned that his station was also at risk of failing if it was not allowed to expand to Newport; it had the lowest listening figures of any ILR station at the time, and it was believed that the combination of the two stations' catchment areas would make the resultant service viable. Despite IBA approval, the unions involved—the Broadcasting and Entertainment Trades Alliance and National Union of Journalists—rejected the initial proposal made to them. A revised offer was agreed. On 24 May 1985, the CBC sustaining service began broadcasting on the former Gwent Broadcasting frequencies as an interim service. The merger was formally abandoned at the end of July, having peaked at support of 81.1 per cent.

By the time the direct merger with CBC had been abandoned, Lancashire-based Red Rose Radio prepared an offer to buy CBC, which in turn would buy out Gwent Broadcasting. On 20 September 1985, shareholders in Gwent Broadcasting assented to the plan, which gave them 6p on the pound or 3p and non-voting shares. Red Rose owned 80 per cent of the resulting station, which launched on 14 October 1985 as the Cardiff-based Red Dragon Radio, with an afternoon drive opt-out for the Newport area.
