= 1985 in the United Kingdom =

Events from the year 1985 in the United Kingdom.

== Incumbents ==
- Monarch – Elizabeth II
- Prime Minister – Margaret Thatcher (Conservative)

== Events ==
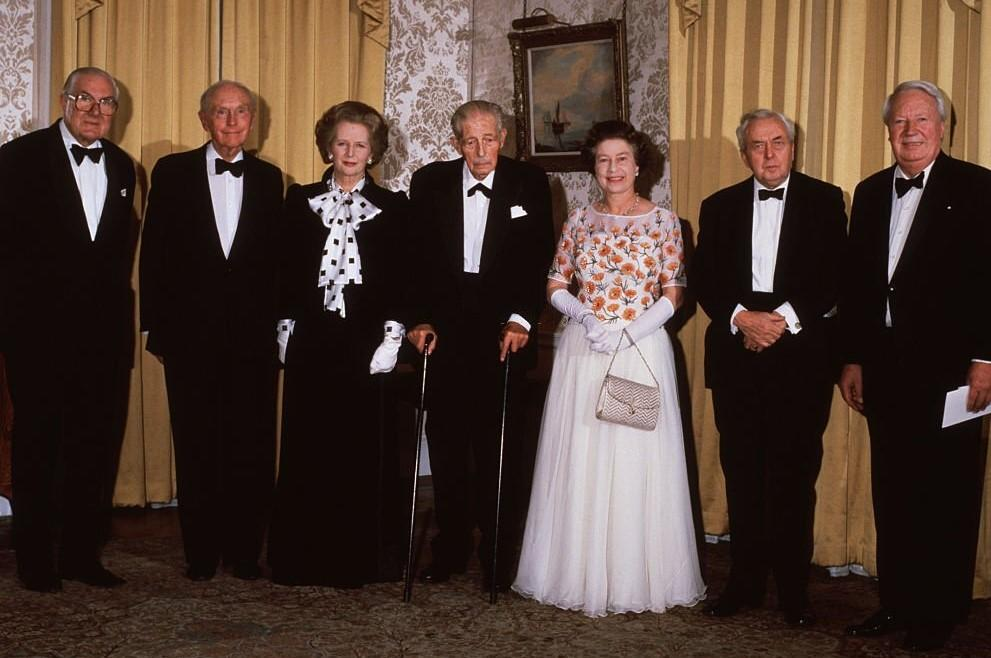
The official photograph of the Queen, the Prime Minister and all her living predecessors at 10 Downing Street on 4 December 1985

=== January ===
- January
  - The Fraud Investigation Group is set up for cases of financial and commercial fraud.
  - The Waterside Inn at Bray, Berkshire, founded by the brothers Michel and Albert Roux, becomes the first establishment in the UK to be awarded three Michelin Guide stars, a distinction which it retains for at least twenty-five years.
  - The first mobile phone network in the UK is launched by Vodafone. (The second would be Cellnet, on 7 January.)
- 7 January – Nine striking coalminers are jailed for arson.
- 10 January
  - The Sinclair C5, a battery-assisted recumbent tricycle, designed by the British inventor Clive Sinclair is launched.
  - Eight people are killed in an explosion in Putney.
- 16 January – London's Dorchester Hotel is bought by the Sultan of Brunei.
- 17 January – British Telecom announces it is going to phase out its iconic red telephone boxes.
- 23 January – A debate in the House of Lords is televised for the first time.
- 25 January – The politician and diplomat David Ormsby-Gore, 5th Baron Harlech, 66, is seriously injured in a car accident at Montford Bridge, Shropshire, and dies the following day.
- 29 January – Margaret Thatcher becomes the first post-war Prime Minister to be publicly refused an honorary degree by Oxford University.

=== February ===
- 10 February – Nine people are killed in a multiple crash on the M6 motorway.
- 14 February – Barbadian-born actress Eva Mottley is found dead aged 31 in her flat in Maida Vale, London. Her death is later confirmed as suicide by overdose.
- 16 February – Civil servant Clive Ponting resigns from the Ministry of Defence after his acquittal of breaching section 2 of the Official Secrets Act 1911 concerning the leaking of documents relating to the sinking of the ARA General Belgrano during the Falklands War.
- 19 February – EastEnders, the BBC One soap opera set in the fictional London Borough of Walford, debuts.
- 25 February – UK miners' strike (1984–85): Nearly 4,000 striking coalminers return to work, meaning that only just over half of the miners are now on strike.
- 26 February – Following his trial and conviction at St Albans Crown Court, Malcolm Fairley, the sex attacker known as The Fox, is handed six life sentences.
- 28 February – 1985 Newry mortar attack: The Provisional Irish Republican Army carries out a mortar attack on the Royal Ulster Constabulary police station in Newry, killing nine officers in the highest loss of life for the RUC on a single day.

=== March ===
- 3 March – The UK Miners' Strike, involving at its peak 142,000 coalminers, ends after one year.
- 7 March – Two IRA members are jailed for 35 years at the Old Bailey for plotting the bombing campaign across London during 1981.
- 11 March – Mohammed Al Fayed buys the London-based department store company Harrods.
- 13 March – Rioting breaks out at the FA Cup quarter-final between Luton Town and Millwall at Kenilworth Road, Luton; hundreds of hooligans tear seats from the stands and throw them onto the pitch before a pitch invasion takes place, resulting in 81 people (31 of them police officers) being injured. The carnage continues in the streets near the stadium, resulting in major damage to vehicles and property. Luton Town win the game 1–0.
- 19 March
  - After beginning the year with a lead of up to eight points in the opinion poll, the Conservatives suffer a major blow as the latest MORI poll puts them four points behind Labour, who have a 40% share of the vote.
  - Ford launches the third generation of its Granada. It is sold only as a hatchback, in contrast to its predecessor which was sold as a saloon or estate and in continental Europe it will be known as the Scorpio.
- 21 March – Actor Sir Michael Redgrave dies aged 77 of Parkinson's disease in a nursing home at Denham.

=== April ===
- 11 April – An eighteen-month-old boy becomes the youngest person in the UK to die of HIV/AIDS.
- 22 April – Construction of Japanese carmaker Nissan's new factory at Sunderland, Tyne and Wear, begins. The first cars are expected to be produced next year.
- 30 April – Bernie Grant, born in Guyana, becomes the first black council leader when he is elected as leader of the Labour-controlled London Borough of Haringey council.

=== May ===
- 2 May – The SDP–Liberal Alliance makes big gains in local council elections.
- 11 May
  - 56 people are killed in the Bradford City stadium fire.
  - A 14-year-old boy is killed, 20 people are injured and several vehicles are wrecked when Leeds United football hooligans riot at the Birmingham City stadium and cause a wall to collapse.
- 13 May – The Dire Straits album Brothers in Arms is released; it becomes the first compact disc to sell over 1,000,000 copies.
- 15 May – Everton, who have already clinched their first Football League title for fifteen years, win the European Cup Winners' Cup, their first European trophy, with a 3–1 win over Rapid Vienna in Rotterdam. English clubs have now won 25 European trophies since 1963. Everton are also in contention for a treble of major trophies, as they take on Manchester United in the FA Cup final in three days.
- 16 May
  - Two South Wales miners are sentenced to life imprisonment for the murder of taxi driver David Wilkie. Dean Hancock and Russell Shankland, both twenty-one years old, dropped a concrete block on Mr. Wilkie's taxi from a road overbridge in November last year.
  - Scientists of the British Antarctic Survey discover the ozone hole.
- 18 May – Manchester United win the FA Cup for the sixth time in their history with a 1–0 win over Everton in the final at Wembley Stadium. The only goal of the game is scored by twenty-year-old Northern Irish forward Norman Whiteside, who scored in United's last FA Cup triumph two years earlier.
- 29 May – In the Heysel Stadium disaster at the European Cup final in Brussels, 39 football fans die and hundreds are injured. Despite the tragedy, the match is played and Juventus beat Liverpool 1–0.
- 31 May – The Football Association bans all English football clubs from playing in Europe until further notice in response to the Heysel riots. Thatcher supports the ban and calls for judges to hand out stiffer sentences to convicted football hooligans.

=== June ===
- 1 June – Battle of the Beanfield, Britain's largest mass arrest and the effective end of Stonehenge Free Festivals.
- 2 June – In response to the Heysel Stadium disaster four days ago, UEFA bans all English football clubs from European competitions for an indefinite period, recommending that Liverpool should serve an extra three years of exclusion once all other English clubs have been reinstated.
- 6 June – Birmingham unveils its bid to host the 1992 Summer Olympics, which includes plans for a new £66,000,000 stadium.
- 13 June – The fourteenth James Bond film – A View to a Kill – is released, marking the seventh and final appearance by Roger Moore as the fictional secret agent after six films since 1973.
- 22 June – Police arrest thirteen suspects in connection with the Brighton hotel bombing of 1984.
- 29 June – Patrick Magee is charged with the murder of the people who died in the Brighton bombing eight months ago.

=== July ===
- 4 July
  - 13-year-old Ruth Lawrence achieves a first in Mathematics at the University of Oxford, becoming the youngest British person ever to earn a first-class degree and the youngest known graduate of the university.
  - Unemployment for June falls to 3,178,582 from May's total of 3,240,947, the best fall in unemployment of the decade so far.
  - The Brecon and Radnor by-election, caused by the death of the sitting Conservative MP Tom Hooson on 8 May, is held. The seat is won by the Liberal candidate Richard Livsey, representing the SDP–Liberal Alliance.
- 13 July – Live Aid pop concerts in London and Philadelphia raise over £50,000,000 for famine relief in Ethiopia.
- 24 July – Country code top-level domain .uk registered.
- 25 July–4 August – The World Games take place in London.
- 29 July – Despite unemployment having fallen since October last year, it has increased in 73 Conservative constituencies, according to government figures.

=== August ===
- 7 August – Five people are found killed in the White House Farm murders in Essex. Nevill and June Bamber, a couple in their sixties, are found shot dead, as is their 27-year-old adoptive daughter Sheila Caffell and her six-year-old twin sons Daniel and Nicholas. The crime is initially treated by the police and reported by the media as a murder-suicide committed by Sheila Caffell, who had a long history of mental health issues.
- 13 August
  - The first UK heart-lung transplant is carried out at the Harefield Hospital in Middlesex. The patient is three-year-old Jamie Gavin.
  - The Sinclair C5 ceases production after just seven months and fewer than 17,000 units.
- 22 August – 55 people are killed in the Manchester air disaster at Manchester International Airport when a British Airtours Boeing 737 bursts into flames after the pilot aborts the take-off.
- 24 August – Five-year-old John Shorthouse is shot dead by police at his family's house in Birmingham, where they were arresting his father on suspicion of an armed robbery committed in South Wales.

=== September ===
- September
  - SEAT, the Spanish carmaker originally a subsidy of Fiat but now under controlling interest from Volkswagen, begins importing cars to the United Kingdom. Its range consists of the Marbella (a rebadged version of the Fiat Panda), the Ibiza hatchback and Malaga saloon.
  - United Kingdom BSE outbreak: Earliest confirmed case of bovine spongiform encephalopathy in British cattle, by post-mortem examination of a cow from Sussex, although not confirmed as such until June 1987.
- 1 September – A joint French-American expedition locates the wreck of the RMS Titanic in the North Atlantic.
- 2 September – England win the 1985 Ashes series in cricket.
- 4 September – The first photographs and films of the RMS Titanic's wreckage are taken, 73 years after it sank.
- 6 September – The Scottish Exhibition and Conference Centre opens in Glasgow.
- The first Toys R Us stores in the UK in Woking, Wood Green and Basildon.
- 7 September – Welsh fashion designer Laura Ashley, 60, is seriously injured in a fall at her daughter's home near Coventry. She dies of her injuries ten days later.
- 8 September – Jeremy Bamber is arrested on suspicion of murdering his adoptive parents, sister and two nephews in last month's White House Farm murders.
- 9 September – Rioting, mostly motivated by racial tension, breaks out in the Handsworth area of Birmingham.
- 10 September
  - The riots in Handsworth escalate, with mass arson and looting resulting in thousands of pounds worth of damage, leaving several people injured, and resulting in the deaths of two people when the local post office is petrol-bombed, one of the fatalities being its owner.
  - Scotland national football team manager Jock Stein, 62, collapses and dies from a heart attack at the end of his team's 1–1 draw with Wales at Ninian Park, Cardiff, which secured Scotland's place in the World Cup qualification play-off.
- 11 September
  - The rioting in Handsworth ends, with the final casualty toll standing at 35 injuries and two deaths. A further two people are unaccounted for. Enoch Powell, the controversial former-Conservative MP who was dismissed from the Shadow Cabinet seventeen years earlier for his Rivers of Blood speech on immigration, states that the riots in Handsworth were a vindication of the warnings he voiced in 1968.
  - The England national football team secures qualification for next summer's World Cup in Mexico with a 1–1 draw against Romania at Wembley. Tottenham midfielder Glenn Hoddle scores England's only goal.
- 17 September – Margaret Thatcher's hopes of winning a third term in office at the next general election are thrown into doubt by the results of an opinion poll, which shows the Conservatives in third place on 30%, Labour in second place on 33% and the SDP–Liberal Alliance in the lead on 35%.
- 28 September
  - A riot in Brixton erupts in response to Metropolitan Police shooting Dorothy "Cherry" Groce in her home during a raid. One person dies in the riot, fifty are injured and more than 200 are arrested.
  - Manchester United's excellent start to the Football League First Division season sees them win their tenth league game in succession, leaving them well-placed to win their first league title since 1967.
- 29 September – Jeremy Bamber is rearrested upon his return to England after two weeks on holiday in France and charged with the five White House Farm murders.

=== October ===
- 1 October
  - Neil Kinnock makes a speech at the Labour Party Conference in Bournemouth attacking the entryist Militant group in Liverpool.
  - Economists predict that unemployment will remain above the 3,000,000 mark for the rest of the decade.
- 3 October – South Georgia and the South Sandwich Islands are separated from the Falkland Islands Dependencies.
- 5 October – Mrs. Cythnia Jarrett, a 49-year-old black woman, dies after falling over during a police search of her home on the Broadwater Farm estate in Tottenham, London.
- 6 October – PC Keith Blakelock is fatally stabbed during the Broadwater Farm Riot in Tottenham, London, which began after the death of Cynthia Jarrett yesterday. Two of his colleagues are treated in hospital for gunshot wounds, as are three journalists.
- 15 October – The SDP-Liberal Alliance's brief lead in the opinion polls is over, with the Conservatives now back in the lead by a single point over Labour in the latest MORI poll.
- 17 October – The House of Lords decides the legal case of Gillick v West Norfolk and Wisbech Area Health Authority, which sets the significant precedent of Gillick competence, i.e. that a child of sixteen or under may be competent to consent to contraception or – by extension – other medical treatment without requiring parental permission or knowledge.
- 24 October – Members of Parliament react to the recent wave of rioting, by saying that unemployment is an unacceptable excuse for the riots.
- 28 October – Production of the Peugeot 309 begins at the Ryton car factory near Coventry. The 309, a small family hatchback, is the first "foreign" car to be built in the UK. It was originally going to be badged as the Talbot Arizona, but Peugeot has decided that the Talbot badge will be discontinued on passenger cars after next year and that the Ryton plant will then be used for the production of its own products, including a larger four-door saloon (similar in size to the Ford Sierra) which is due in two years.
- 30 October – Unemployment is reported to have risen in nearly 70% of the Conservative held seats since October 1984.
- 31 October – The two miners who killed taxi driver David Wilkie in South Wales eleven months earlier, have their life sentences for murder reduced to eight years for manslaughter on appeal.

=== November ===
- 1 November
  - Aircraft carrier HMS Ark Royal is commissioned by the Queen Mother.
  - Unemployment for September falls by nearly 70,000 to less than 3,300,000.
- 5 November – Mark Kaylor defeats Errol Christie to become the middleweight boxing champion, after the two brawl in front of the cameras at the weigh-in.
- 9 November – The Prince and Princess of Wales (Charles and Diana) arrive in the United States for a visit to Ronald Reagan in Washington, D.C.
- 15 November – Anglo-Irish Agreement signed at Hillsborough Castle. Treasury Minister Ian Gow resigns in protest at the deal.
- 17 November – The Confederation of British Industry calls for the government to invest £1,000,000,000 in unemployment relief – a move which would cut unemployment by 350,000 and potentially bring it below 3,000,000 for the first time since late-1981.
- 18 November – A coach crash on the M6 motorway near Birmingham kills two people and injures 51 others.
- 19 November – The latest MORI poll shows that Conservative and Labour support is almost equal at around 36%, with the SDP–Liberal Alliance's hopes of electoral breakthrough left looking bleak as they have polled only 25% of the vote.
- 22 November – Margaret Thatcher is urged by her MPs to call a general election for June 1987, despite the deadline not being until June 1988 and recent opinion polls frequently showing Labour and the Alliance equal with the Conservatives, although the Conservative majority has remained well into triple figures.
- 25 November – Department store chains British Home Stores and Habitat announce a £1,500,000,000 amalgamation.
- 27 November – Labour Party leader Neil Kinnock suspends the Liverpool District Labour Party amid allegations that the Trotskyist Militant group is attempting to control it.
- 29 November
  - A gas explosion kills four people in Glasgow.
  - Gérard Hoarau, exiled political leader from the Seychelles, is assassinated in London.

=== December ===
- December – Builders Alfred McAlpine complete construction of Nissan's new car factory at Sunderland. Nissan can now install machinery and factory components and car production is expected to begin by the summer of next year.
- 2 December – Author and librarian Philip Larkin dies of cancer aged 61 in Kingston upon Hull.
- 4 December
  - The Queen and all the five living former Prime Ministers attend an official dinner hosted by Denis and Margaret Thatcher at 10 Downing Street to mark the 250th anniversary of the building becoming the Prime Minister's official residence.
  - Scotland's World Cup qualification is secured by a goalless draw with Australia in the play-off second leg in Sydney.
- 5 December
  - It is announced that unemployment fell in November, for the third month running. It now stands at 3,165,000.
  - The Tyne Bridge by-election, caused by the death of the sitting Labour MP Harry Cowans on 3 October, is held. David Clelland holds the seat for Labour.
- 7 December – Poet, author and critic Robert Graves dies aged 90 at his home at Deià on the Spanish island of Majorca.
- 25 December – Charitable organisation Comic Relief is launched.
- 26 December
  - A siege at a flat in Northolt, London, comes to an end after 29 hours when armed police storm the property and arrest 29-year-old Errol Walker, who had stabbed a woman to death and was holding her daughter hostage. The dramatic conclusion is captured by television cameras.
  - Rock star Phil Lynott (36), formerly a member of the band Thin Lizzy, is rushed to hospital after collapsing from a suspected heroin overdose at his home in Berkshire. He will die on 4 January 1986.
- December – After three successive monthly falls in unemployment, the jobless count for this month has increased by nearly 15,000 to 3,181,300.

=== Undated ===
- Inflation stands at 6.1% – the highest since 1982, but still low compared to the highs reached in the 1970s.
- Peak year for British oil production: 127,000,000 tonnes.
- A record of more than 1.8 million new cars have been sold in Britain during this year, beating the previous record set in 1983. The Ford Escort is Britain's most popular new car for the fourth year running and all of the top 10 best-selling new cars are produced by Ford, Vauxhall or Austin Rover. Continental and Japanese manufacturers enjoy a good-sized percentage of the new car market though, with Fiat, Nissan, Peugeot, Renault, Volkswagen and Volvo all doing well. These figures are announced on 7 January 1986 by the Society of Motor Manufacturers and Traders.
- The first retailers move into the Merry Hill Shopping Centre near Dudley, West Midlands. A new shopping centre is scheduled to open alongside the developing retail park in April 1986 and it is anticipated to grow into Europe's largest indoor shopping centre with further developments set to be completed by 1990, as well as including a host of leisure facilities.

== Publications ==
- Margaret Atwood's novel The Handmaid's Tale.
- Iain Banks's novel Walking on Glass.
- Jilly Cooper's novel Riders, first of the Rutshire Chronicles.
- Tony Harrison's poem V.
- Jeanette Winterson's novel Oranges Are Not the Only Fruit.

== Births ==
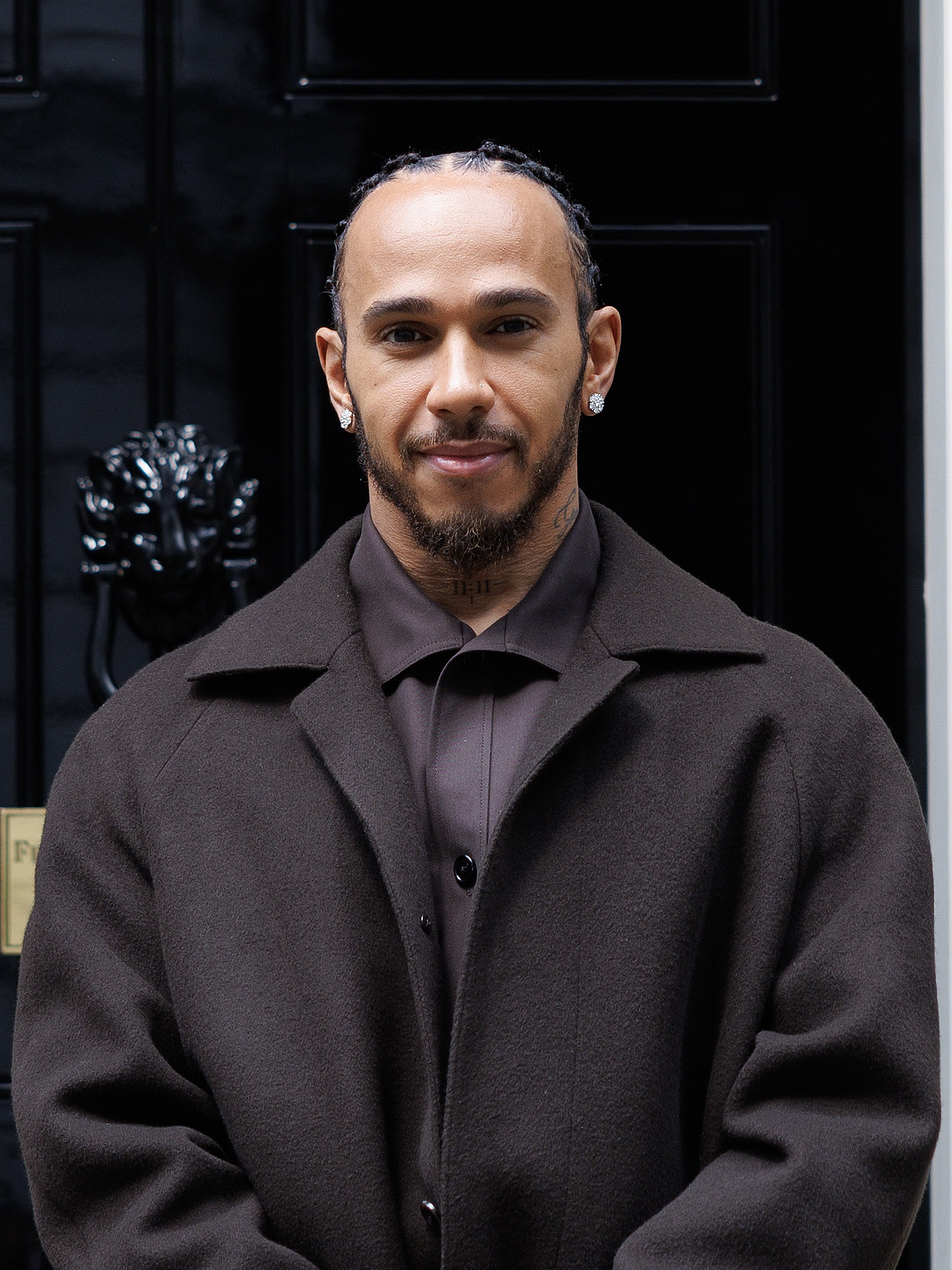
Lewis Hamilton

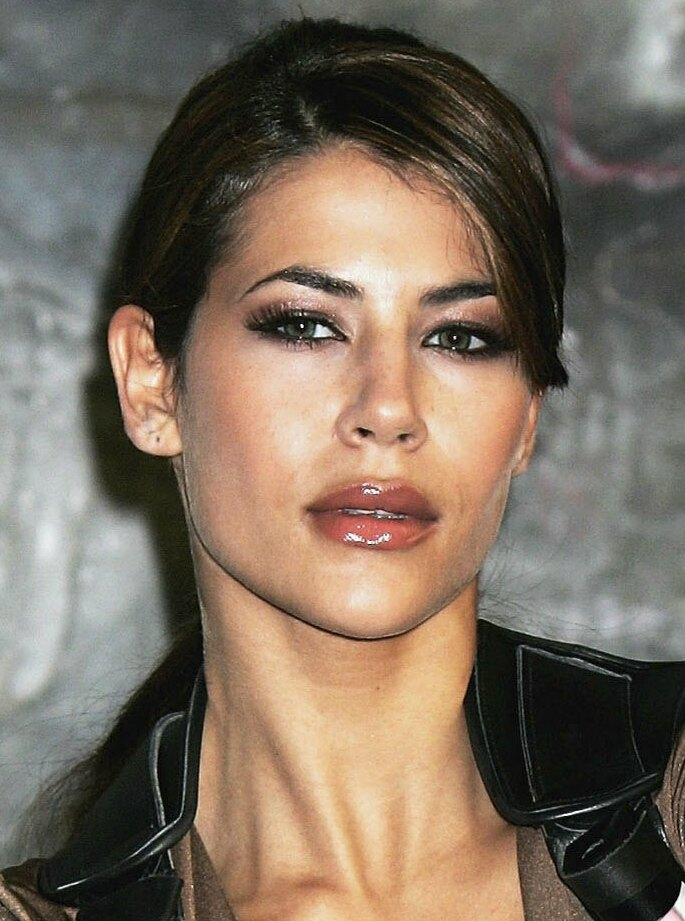
Karima Adebibe

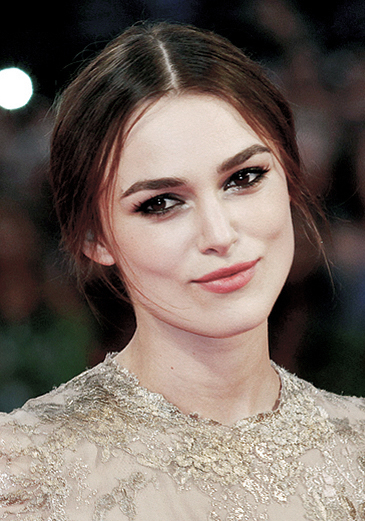
Keira Knightley

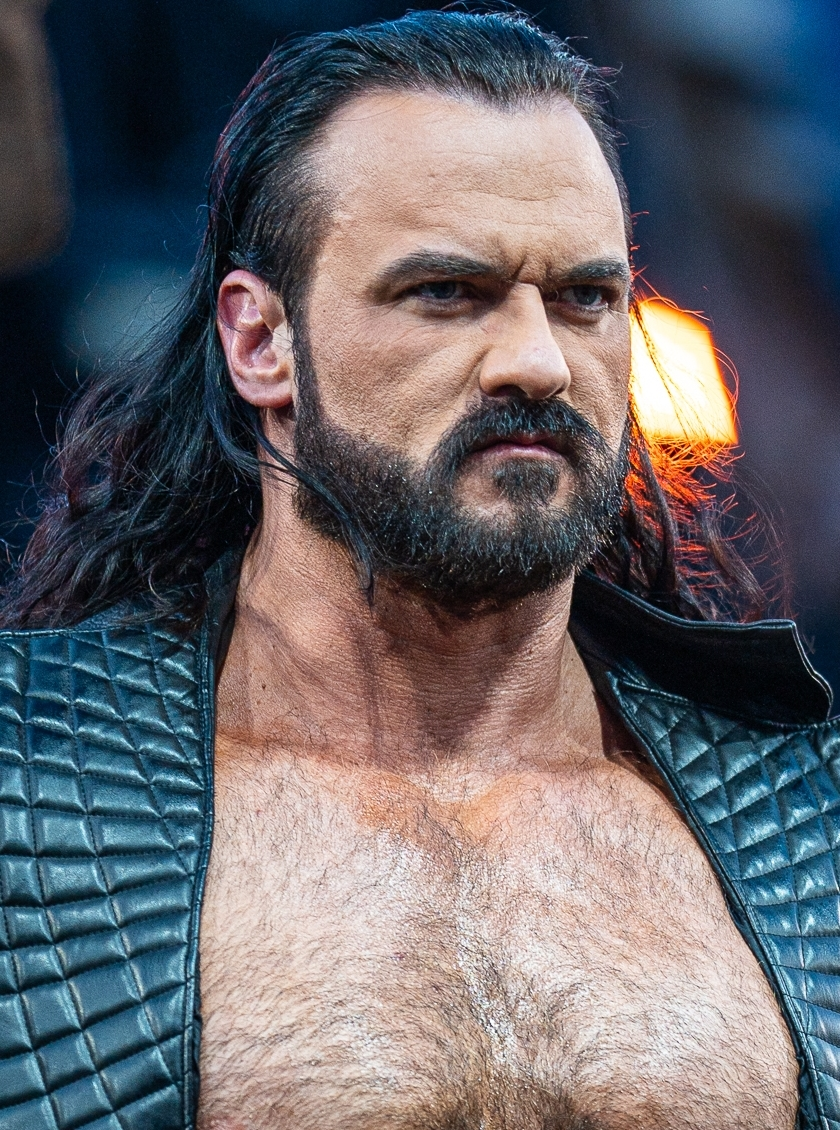
Drew McIntyre

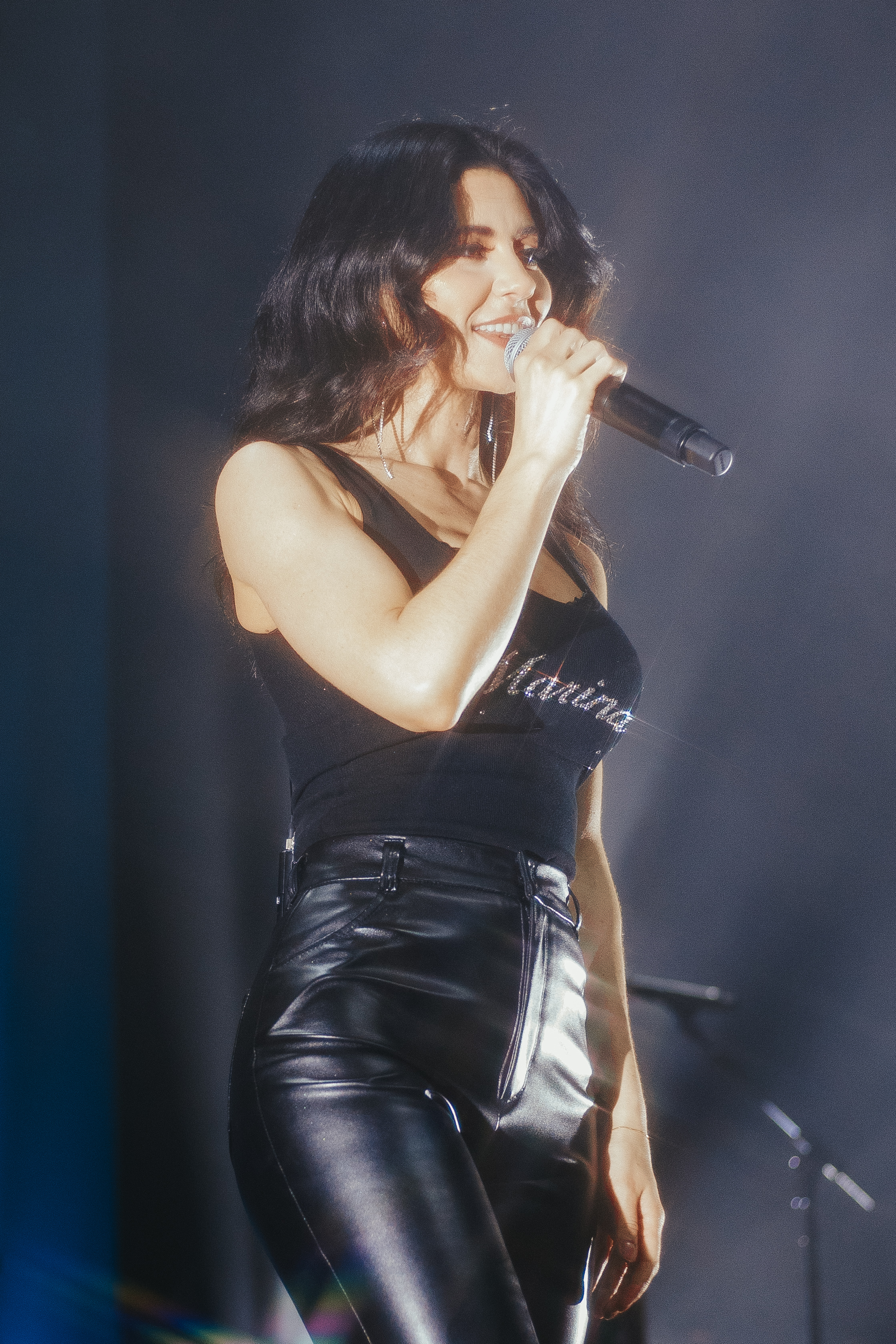
Marina Diamandis

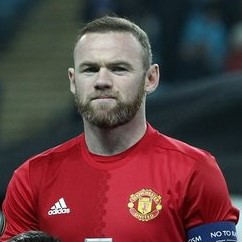
Wayne Rooney

=== January ===
- 1 January – Steven Davis, footballer
- 4 January – Lenora Crichlow, actress
- 6 January – Hugh Skinner, actor
- 7 January
  - Lewis Hamilton, Formula One racing driver
  - Wayne Routledge, English footballer
- 9 January – James Acaster, comedian
- 11 January – Newton Faulkner, rock musician
- 16 January – Craig Jones, motorcycle racer (died 2008)
- 20 January – Olivia Hallinan, actress
- 24 January – Ian Henderson, footballer
- 26 January
  - Rusko, musician
  - Heather Stanning, rower
- 28 January – Tom Hopper, actor

=== February ===
- 1 February – Dean Shiels, footballer
- 5 February – Emma Barnett, broadcaster and journalist
- 10 February – Cath Rae, Scottish field hockey goalkeeper
- 14 February – Karima Adebibe, actress and model
- 16 February – Simon Francis, footballer
- 17 February – Duane Goodfield, Welsh rugby union player
- 20 February – Michael Oliver, football referee

=== March ===
- 3 March – Sam Morrow, footballer
- 5 March – David Marshall, footballer
- 7 March – Gerwyn Price, darts player
- 11 March – Richard Hoden, politician
- 17 March – Dominic Adams, actor and model
- 26 March – Keira Knightley, actress
- 27 March - Julia Goulding, actress

=== April ===
- 1 April – Beth Tweddle, gymnast
- 3 April – Leona Lewis, singer
- 7 April – Humza Yousaf, Scottish politician
- 8 April – Gareth Rees, cricketer
- 20 April – Amanda Fahy, actress

=== May ===
- 2 May – Lily Allen, singer
- 9 May – Jason Arday, sociologist (died 2026)
- 15 May – James Dean, footballer (died 2021)
- 21 May
  - Mutya Buena, urban singer (Sugababes)
  - Alison Carroll, artistic gymnast, actress and model
  - Mark Cavendish, road racing cyclist
  - Alex Danson, field hockey player
- 22 May – Stuart Tomlinson, footballer and wrestler
- 28 May – Carey Mulligan, actress

=== June ===
- 6 June – Drew McIntyre, wrestler
- 7 June
  - Charlie Simpson, singer-songwriter
  - Simon Whaley, footballer
- 15 June
  - Nadine Coyle, singer
- 20 June - Miaoux Miaoux, keyboardist (Franz Ferdinand)
- 24 June – Tom Kennedy, footballer
- 25 June – Scott Brown, football player and manager
- 28 June – Phil Bardsley, footballer

=== July ===
- 3 July – Dean Cook, actor
- 5 July – Nick O'Malley, musician
- 7 July – Georgina Baillie, singer, actor and artist
- 9 July – Ashley Young, footballer
- 13 July – Charlotte Dujardin, dressage rider
- 14 July – Phoebe Waller-Bridge, comic actress and screenwriter
- 22 July – Blake Harrison, actor
- 30 July – Aml Ameen, actor

=== August ===
- 12 August – Charlotte Salt, actress
- 15 August – Verity Rushworth, actress

=== September ===
- 3 September – Scott Carson, footballer
- 19 September – Sarah Hunter, rugby player
- 21 September – Joe Wicks, fitness coach and television presenter
- 24 September – Kimberley Nixon, actress
- 26 September – Talulah Riley, actress
- 28 September – Luke Chambers, football player and manager
- 29 September – Mark Fletcher, politician

=== October ===
- 1 October – Emerald Fennell, screen actress and director
- 5 October - Nicola Roberts, singer and songwriter
- 6 October – Mitchell Cole, footballer (died 2012)
- 9 October – Frankmusik, electropop musician
- 10 October – Marina Diamandis
- 24 October – Wayne Rooney, footballer
- 25 October
  - Reanne Evans, snooker player
  - Sophie Gradon, model and marketing manager (died 2018)
- 29 October – Janet Montgomery, film and television actress

=== November ===
- 7 November – Paul Terry, actor
- 8 November – Jack Osbourne, actor
- 12 November – Ben Aldridge, actor
- 22 November – James Roby, rugby league player
- 28 November – Ryan Sampson, actor

=== December ===
- 2 December – Seann Walsh, comedian and actor
- 10 December – Ollie Bridewell, motorcycle racer (died 2007)
- 17 December – Greg James, radio and television presenter
- 19 December – Gary Cahill, English footballer
- 21 December – Tom Sturridge, actor
- 22 December – Kae Tempest, performance artist
- 23 December – Harry Judd, pop rock drummer (McFly)

== Deaths ==
=== January ===
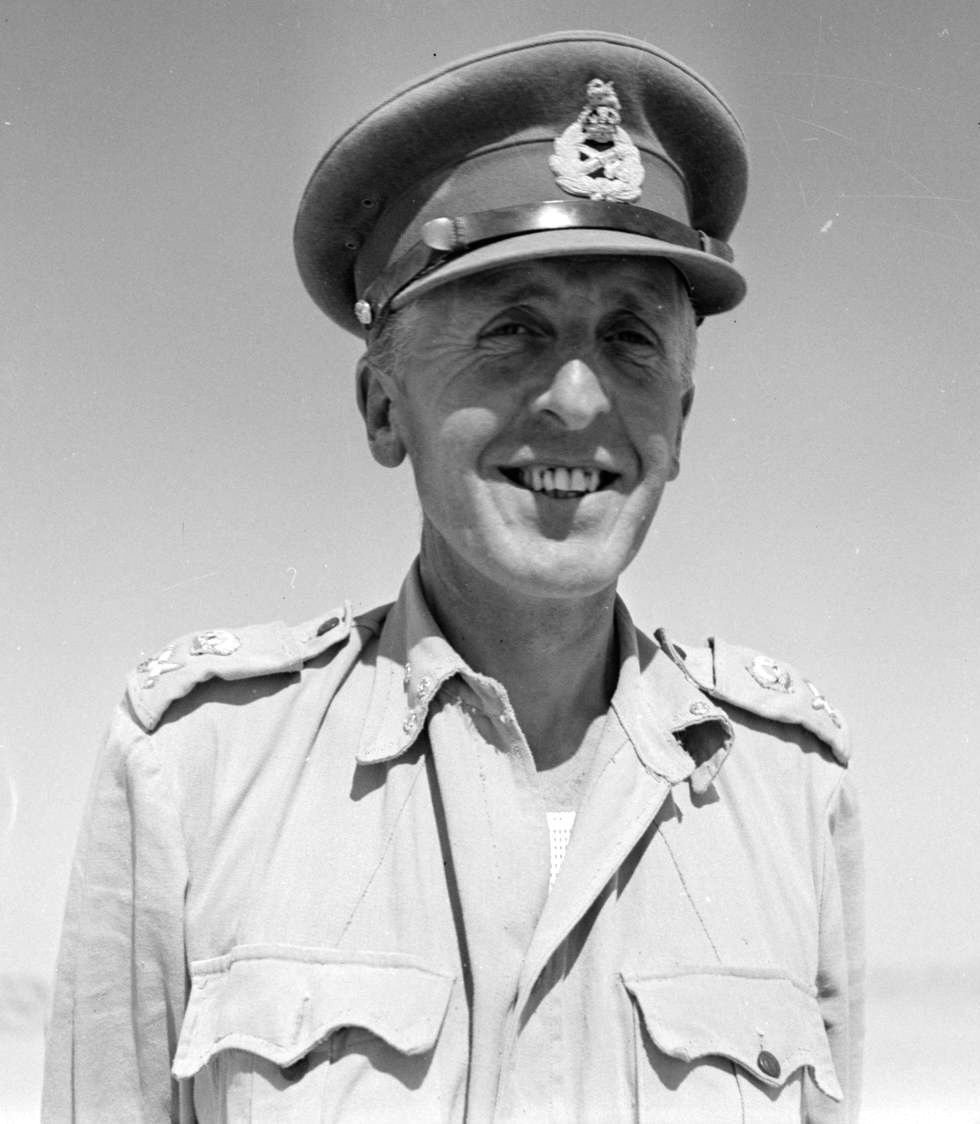
Brian Horrocks

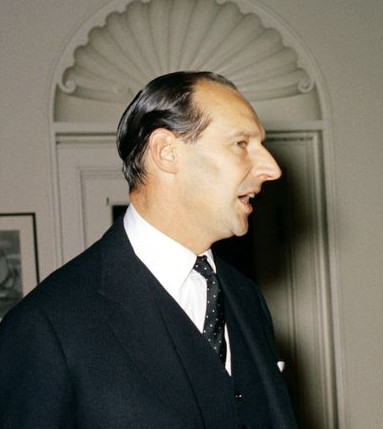
David Ormsby-Gore, 5th Baron Harlech

- 1 January – William Ernest Bowman, engineer and writer (born 1911)
- 2 January – Sir Basil Bartlett, actor and screenwriter (born 1905)
- 4 January
  - Sir Brian Horrocks, Army general (born 1895)
  - Russell Page, gardener (born 1906)
- 5 January – William Gidley Emmett, chemist and educationist (born 1887)
- 7 January – Edith Batten, educationist (born 1905)
- 8 January – Sir Harold Hillier, horticulturalist (born 1905)
- 9 January
  - William Arthur Harland, physician (born 1926)
  - Sir Robert Mayer, philanthropist (born 1879, German Empire)
- 11 January
  - Kenny Clare, jazz drummer (born 1929)
  - Errol White, geologist (born 1901)
- 12 January – Paul Luty, wrestler and actor (born 1932)
- 13 January – Kenneth O'Connor, soldier, lawyer and judge (born 1896)
- 14 January – Alfred Allen, Baron Allen of Fallowfield, trade unionist and BBC governor (born 1914)
- 16 January – Saidie Patterson, Northern Irish trade unionist and peace activist (born 1906)
- 17 January – James Frederic Riley, physician and radiologist (born 1912)
- 18 January
  - Wilfrid Brambell, Irish-born actor (born 1912)
  - Noel Lytton, 4th Earl of Lytton, peer, soldier and writer (born 1900)
  - John Wolfenden, Baron Wolfenden, educationist and compiler of the Wolfenden Report (born 1906)
- 19 January – Joan Hutt, artist (born 1913)
- 20 January – Thomas Balogh, Baron Balogh, economist (born 1905, Austria-Hungary)
- 21 January – Arthur Ernest Hagg, aircraft designer (born 1888)
- 22 January – Sir Arthur Bryant, historian (born 1899)
- 23 January – Mark Hodson, Anglican prelate (born 1907)
- 25 January – Ralph Broome, Army lieutenant-colonel (born 1889)
- 26 January
  - James Cameron, journalist (born 1911)
  - David Ormsby-Gore, 5th Baron Harlech, peer and politician (born 1918; road accident)
- 27 January – Robert McLellan, Scottish poet and dramatist (born 1907)
- 29 January
  - Neil Cameron, Baron Cameron of Balhousie, RAF air marshal (born 1920)
  - Joyce Daniel, birth control activist (born 1890)
  - Chic Murray, comedian (born 1919)

=== February ===
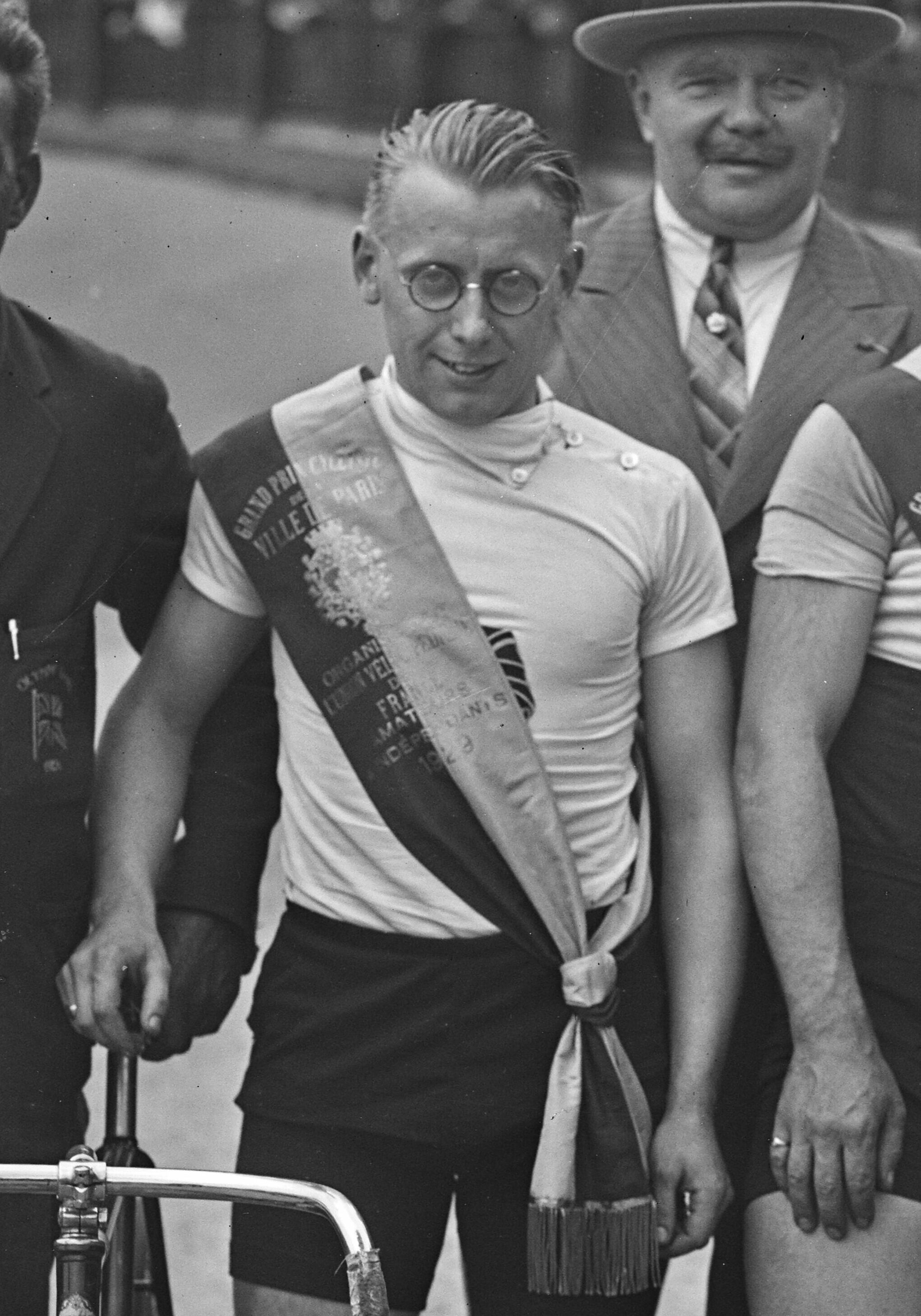
Sydney Cozens

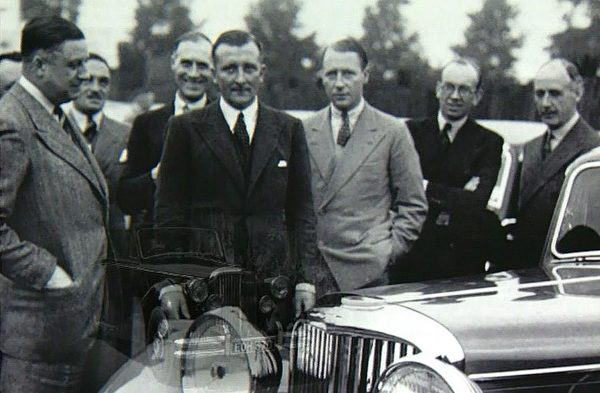
William Lyons

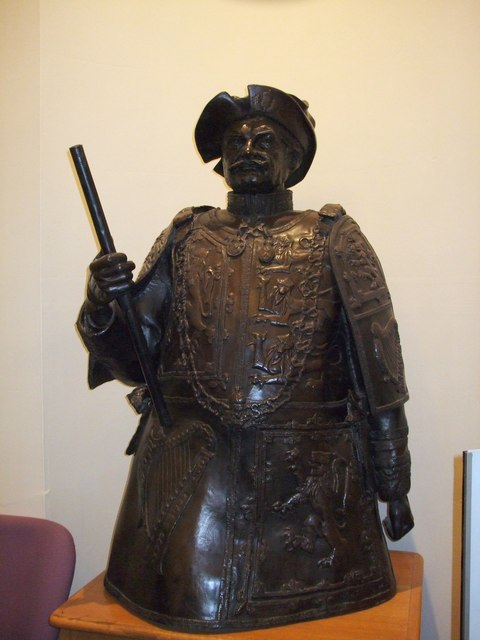
Iain Moncreiffe of that Ilk

- 1 February – Robert Chartham, author (born 1911)
- 5 February
  - Sydney Cozens, cyclist (born 1908)
  - Neil McCarthy, actor (born 1933)
- 6 February – James Hadley Chase, writer (born 1906)
- 7 February – George Edward Briggs, botanist (born 1893)
- 8 February
  - Ursula Edgcumbe, sculptor and painter (born 1900)
  - Sir William Lyons, automobile engineer and designer, founder of Jaguar Cars (born 1901)
  - Sir Guy Salisbury-Jones, Army officer and military attaché (born 1896)
- 9 February – Humphrey Trevelyan, colonial administrator and writer (born 1905)
- 14 February
  - Eva Mottley, actress (suicide) (born 1953, Barbados)
  - Frances Richards, artist (born 1903)
- 16 February
  - Josephine Bradley, ballroom dancer (born 1893)
  - Frederick Smith, 3rd Earl of Birkenhead, peer, writer and historian (born 1936)
- 17 February – George Coppard, World War I veteran (born 1898)
- 18 February
  - Douglas Johnston, Lord Johnston, judge (born 1907)
  - Thurston Williams, architect (born 1924)
- 19 February – Dorothy Black, actress (born 1899, South Africa)
- 21 February – Louis Hayward, actor (born 1909)
- 22 February
  - David Hunt, ornithologist (born 1934; killed by tiger in India)
  - Florence Tunks, suffragette and nurse (born 1891)
- 25 February – Bill Branch, golfer (born 1911)
- 26 February – Douglas Muggeridge, radio controller (born 1928)
- 27 February
  - Sir Iain Moncreiffe of that Ilk, genealogist and Officer of Arms (born 1919)
  - J. Pat O'Malley, actor (born 1904)
- 28 February
  - David Byron, singer (born 1947)
  - Ray Ellington, singer, drummer and bandleader (born 1916)
  - D. W. Lucas, classical scholar (born 1905)

=== March ===
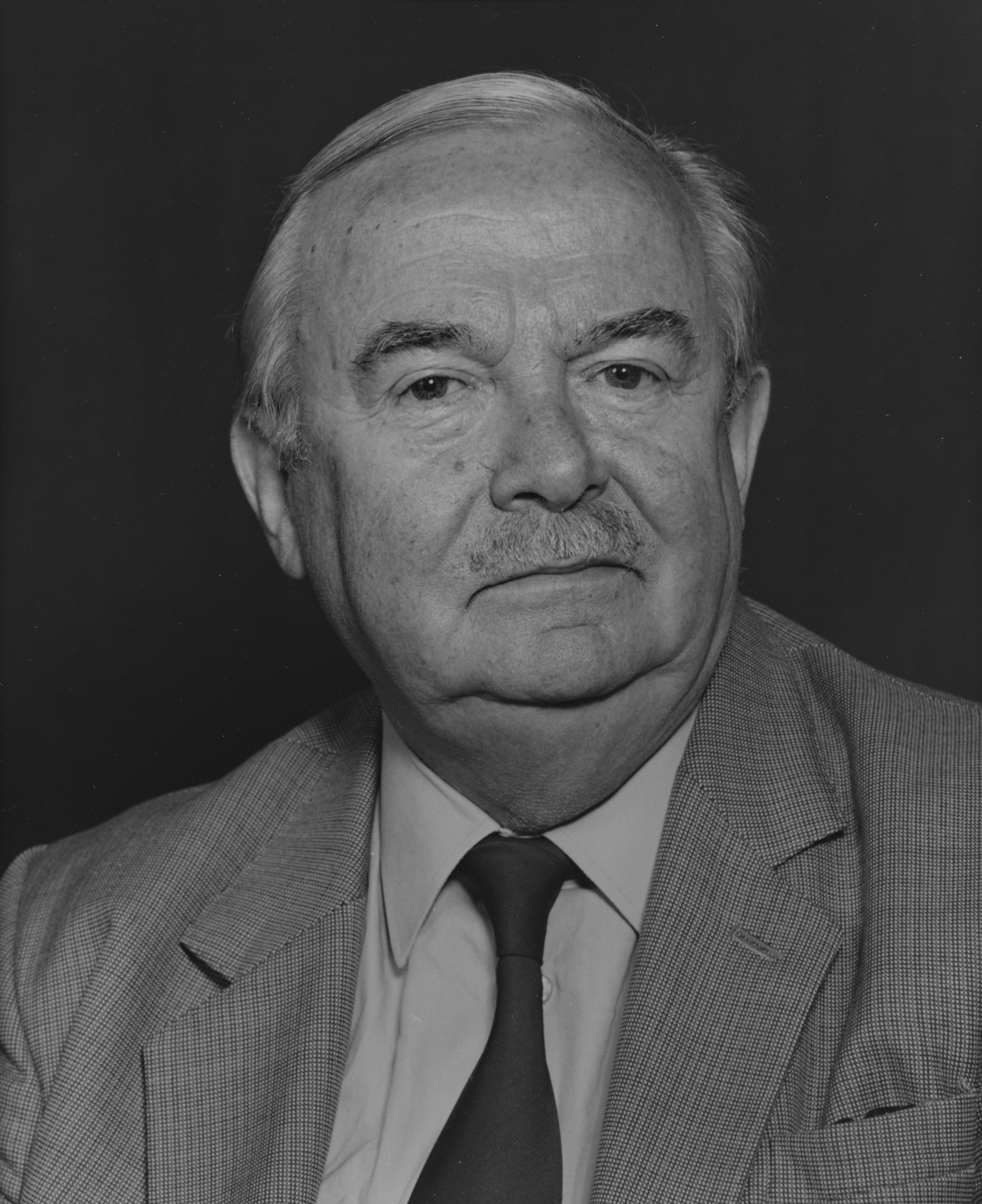
F. S. Northedge

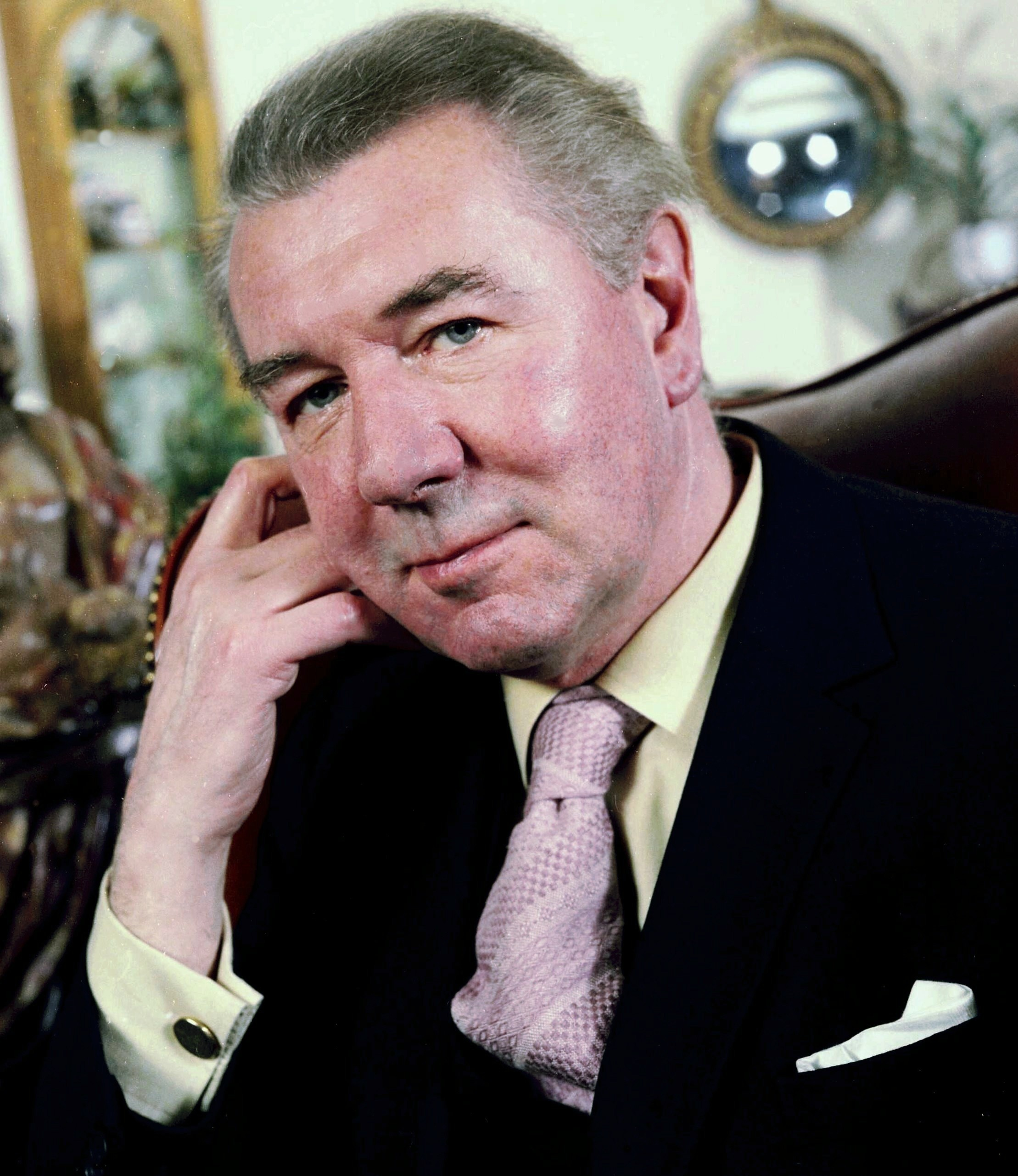
Michael Redgrave

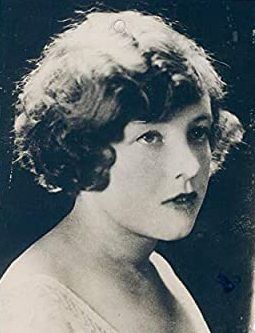
Irene Savidge

- 2 March
  - Arthur Champion, Baron Champion, Labour politician (born 1897)
  - Alexander Watt, botanist (born 1892)
- 3 March
  - Alan Beaney, Labour politician (born 1905)
  - F. S. Northedge, political scientist (born 1918)
- 6 March – David Templeton Gibson, chemist (born 1899)
- 7 March
  - Wilfred Brown, Baron Brown, businessman (born 1908)
  - Clara Winsome Muirhead, Scottish botanist (born 1916)
- 8 March
  - Reuben Goodstein, mathematician (born 1912)
  - Charles Guy Parsloe, historian and Liberal politician (born 1900)
- 9 March
  - Harry Catterick, footballer and football manager (born 1919)
  - John Tudor Jones, Welsh scholar, broadcaster and translator (born 1903)
- 10 March – Victor Hervey, 6th Marquess of Bristol, peer (born 1915)
- 11 March – William Bailey, Royal Navy officer (born 1918, Portugal)
- 15 March
  - Morry Davis, politician (born 1894)
  - Alan A. Freeman, record producer (born 1920)
- 16 March
  - Archibald Lamont, Scottish geologist, palaeontologist, writer and politician (born 1907)
  - Jean Purdy, nurse and embryologist (born 1945)
- 19 March – Anthony Nelson Keys, film producer (born 1911)
- 21 March – Sir Michael Redgrave, actor (born 1908)
- 23 March – Doctor Richard Beeching, railway executive (born 1913)
- 25 March – Horace Birks, Army major-general (born 1897)
- 26 March
  - Irene Savidge, factory worker (born 1905)
  - Henry J. Wilson, Army colonel and farmer (born 1904)
- 27 March – Lydia Manley Henry, physician (born 1891)
- 29 March
  - Sir Fife Clark, journalist and civil servant (born 1907)
  - Joseph Symonds, Labour politician (born 1900)
  - Janet Watson, geologist (born 1927)
- 30 March – John Jolliffe, librarian at the Bodleian (born 1929)

=== April ===
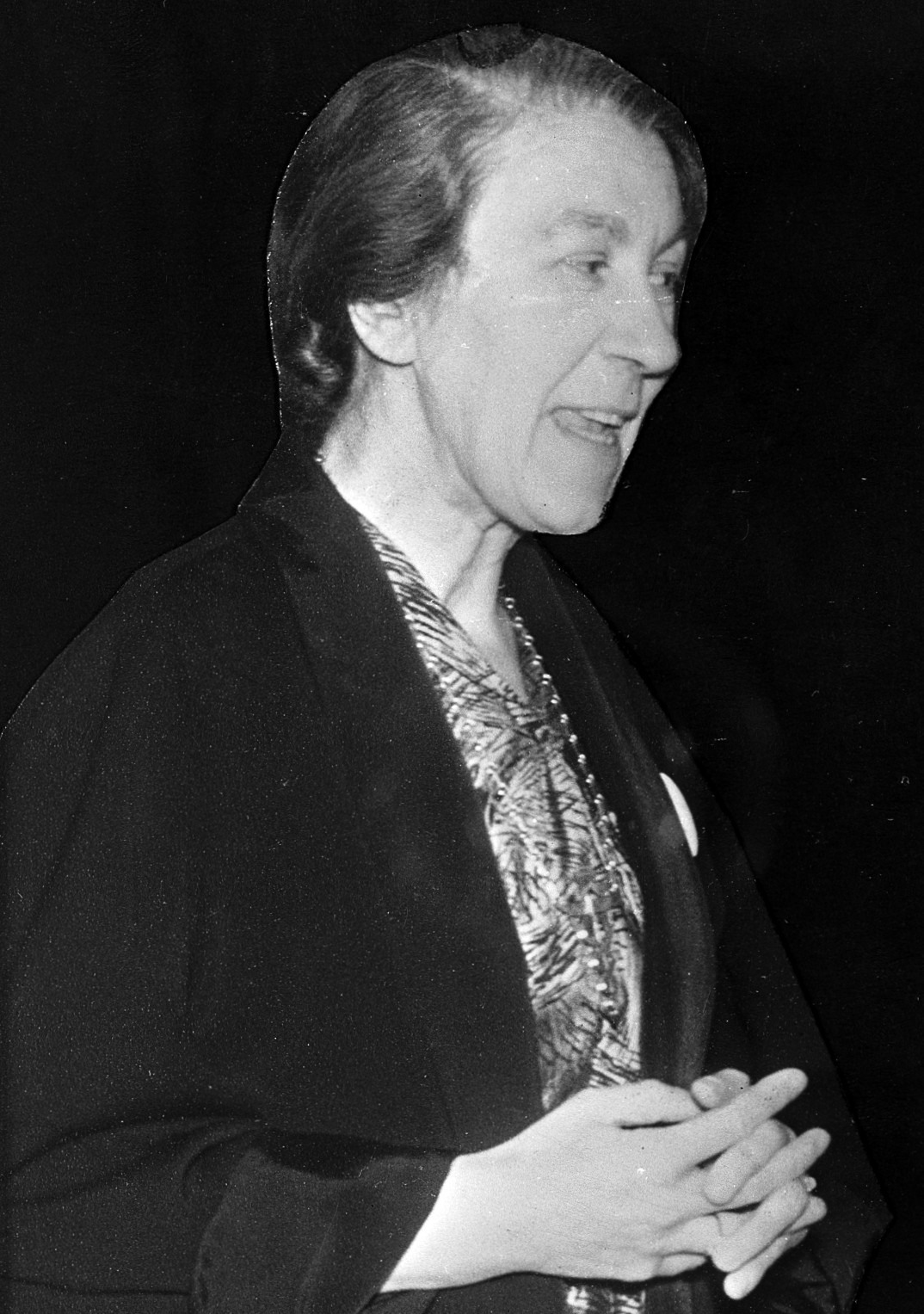
Annis Gillie

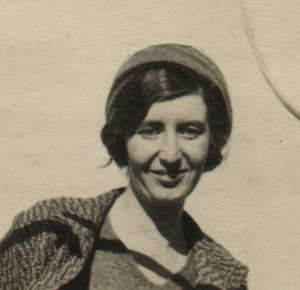
Olga Tufnell

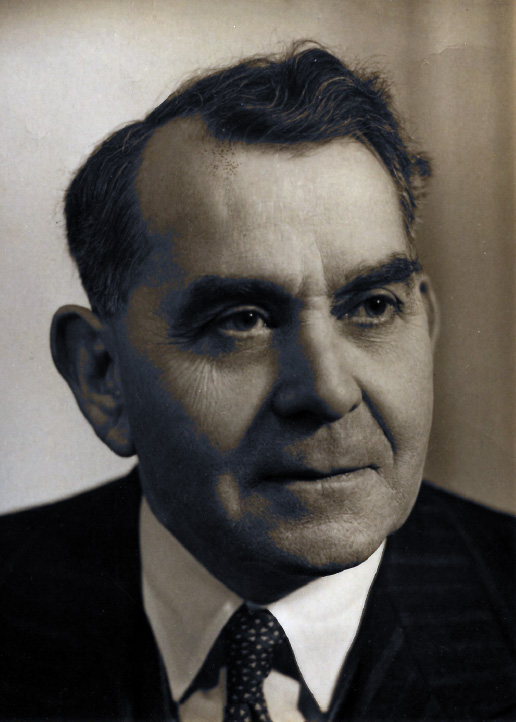
Cecil Manning

- 1 April
  - Alec Clifton-Taylor, historian, writer and television presenter (born 1907)
  - Julian Thornton-Duesbery, clergyman and academic (born 1902)
- 4 April
  - Raymond Briggs, Army major-general (born 1895)
  - Kate Roberts, author (born 1891)
- 6 April – Terence Sanders, Olympic rower (born 1904)
- 5 April – Arthur Negus, broadcaster and antiques specialist (born 1903)
- 7 April
  - David Loveday, Anglican prelate (born 1896)
  - Willie McRae, lawyer, politician and anti-nuclear campaigner (born 1923)
- 10 April
  - David Blair, Scottish golfer (born 1917)
  - Dame Annis Gillie, physician (born 1900)
- 11 April
  - Bunny Ahearne, businessman and ice hockey administrator (born 1900)
  - John Gilroy, artist (born 1898)
  - Olga Tufnell, archaeologist (born 1905)
  - Fred Uhlman, German-English writer, painter and lawyer (born 1901)
- 12 April – Cecil Manning, Labour politician (born 1892)
- 13 April
  - Sir Clavering Fison, businessman and Conservative politician (born 1892)
  - Oscar Nemon, sculptor (born 1906, Austria-Hungary)
- 14 April
  - Noele Gordon, actress (born 1919)
  - Kate Roberts, author (born 1891)
- 17 April
  - John Selwyn Bromley, naval historian (born 1913)
  - Basil Bunting, poet (born 1900)
- 18 April – Gertrude Caton Thompson, archaeologist (born 1888)
- 19 April – Jack Broome, Royal Navy captain (born 1901)
- 20 April
  - William Fisher Cassie, civil engineer (born 1905)
  - Ralph Dutton, 8th Baron Sherborne, peer (born 1898)
- 21 April
  - John Dutton, trade union leader (born 1909)
  - Francis Eaton, 4th Baron Cheylesmore, peer (born 1893)
  - John Welsh, actor (born 1914, Ireland)
  - Sir Owen Temple-Morris, lawyer and Conservative politician (born 1896)
- 22 April
  - A. C. Gimson, phonetician (born 1917)
  - Sir Thomas Parry, Welsh author (born 1904)
  - Syd Scott, golfer (born 1913)
- 23 April – Patrick Wilkinson, classical scholar (born 1907)
- 25 April – Richard Haydn, actor (born 1905)
- 27 April
  - James Dunn, Labour politician (born 1926)
  - Gordon Ross, journalist (born 1917)
- 30 April
  - Sir Max Aitken, 2nd Baronet, Conservative politician, press baron and World War II air ace, son of Lord Beaverbrook (born 1910)
  - Edgar Mountain, athlete (born 1901)
  - Mike Sangster, tennis player (born 1940)

=== May ===
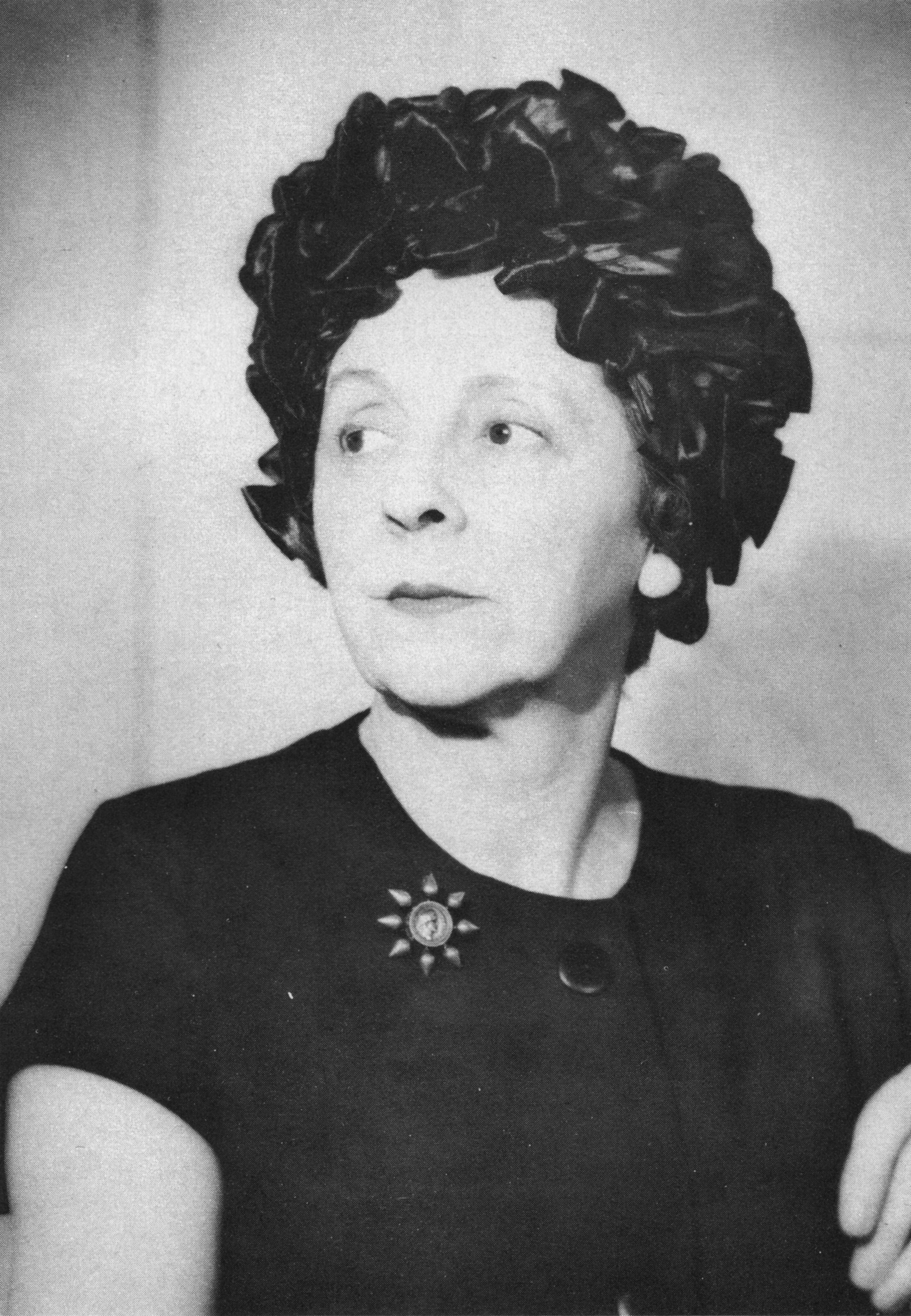
Bridget D'Oyly Carte

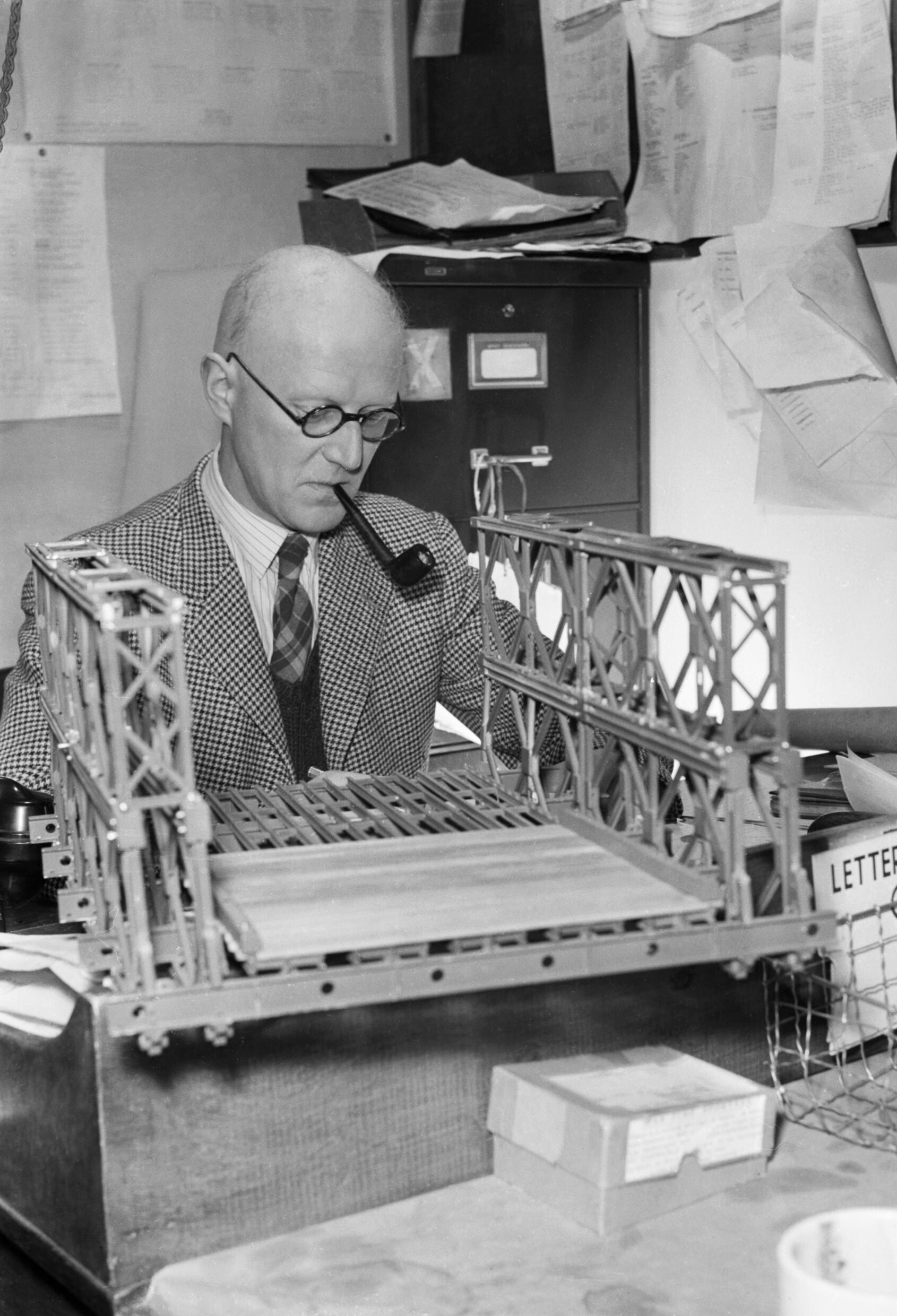
Donald Bailey

- 1 May – Denise Robins, romantic novelist (born 1897)
- 2 May
  - Phyllis Bedells, ballerina (born 1893)
  - Dame Bridget D'Oyly Carte, manager of the D'Oyly Carte Opera Company (1948–1982) (born 1908)
- 3 May
  - R. D. Smith, lecturer and radio producer (born 1914)
  - Foster Neville Woodward, chemist (born 1905)
- 5 May – Sir Donald Bailey, civil engineer (born 1901)
- 7 May
  - Dawn Addams, actress (born 1930)
  - Sir John Woodall, Army lieutenant-general (born 1897)
- 9 May
  - Reginald Dixon, theatre organist (born 1904)
  - Leslie Hale, Baron Hale, politician (born 1902)
- 10 May – Sir Peter Foster, judge (born 1912)
- 15 May – Nigel Henderson, artist (born 1917)
- 16 May
  - Hugh Burden, actor and playwright (born 1913)
  - Harry Earnshaw, cyclist (born 1915)
- 19 May
  - Ellen McCullough, trade unionist (born 1908)
  - Sir Rodney Moore, Army general (born 1905)
- 20 May – Hilary Stratton, sculptor (born 1906)
- 22 May
  - Gerald Case, actor (born 1905)
  - Henry Raeburn Dobson, Scottish artist (born 1901)
  - Sir Alister Hardy, marine biologist (born 1896)
- 24 May – Geoffrey Gorer, anthropologist and author (born 1905)
- 28 May – Roy Plomley, radio broadcaster, producer, playwright and novelist, founder of Desert Island Discs (born 1914)
- 30 May – George K. Arthur, actor and producer (born 1899)

=== June ===
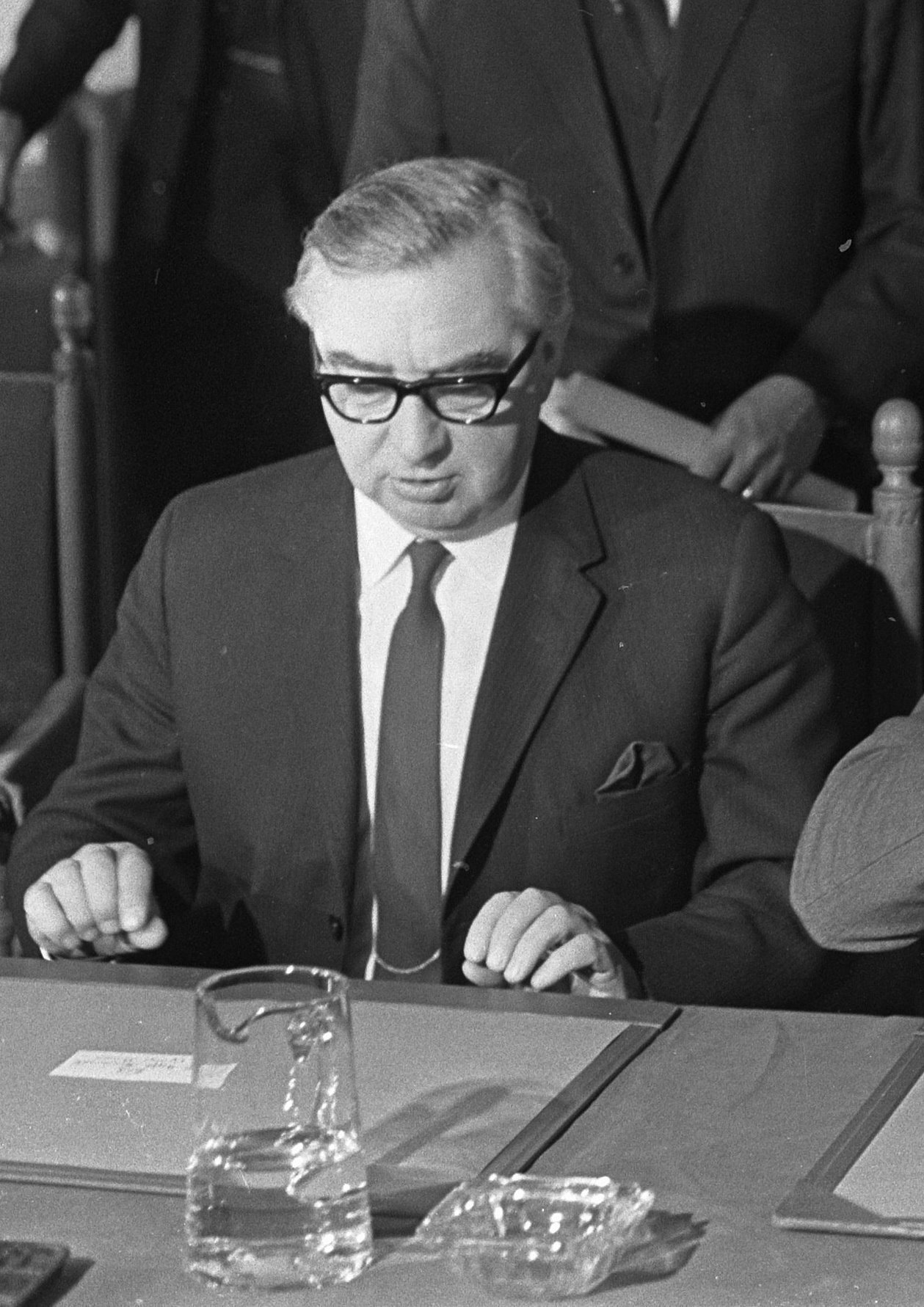
Lord George-Brown

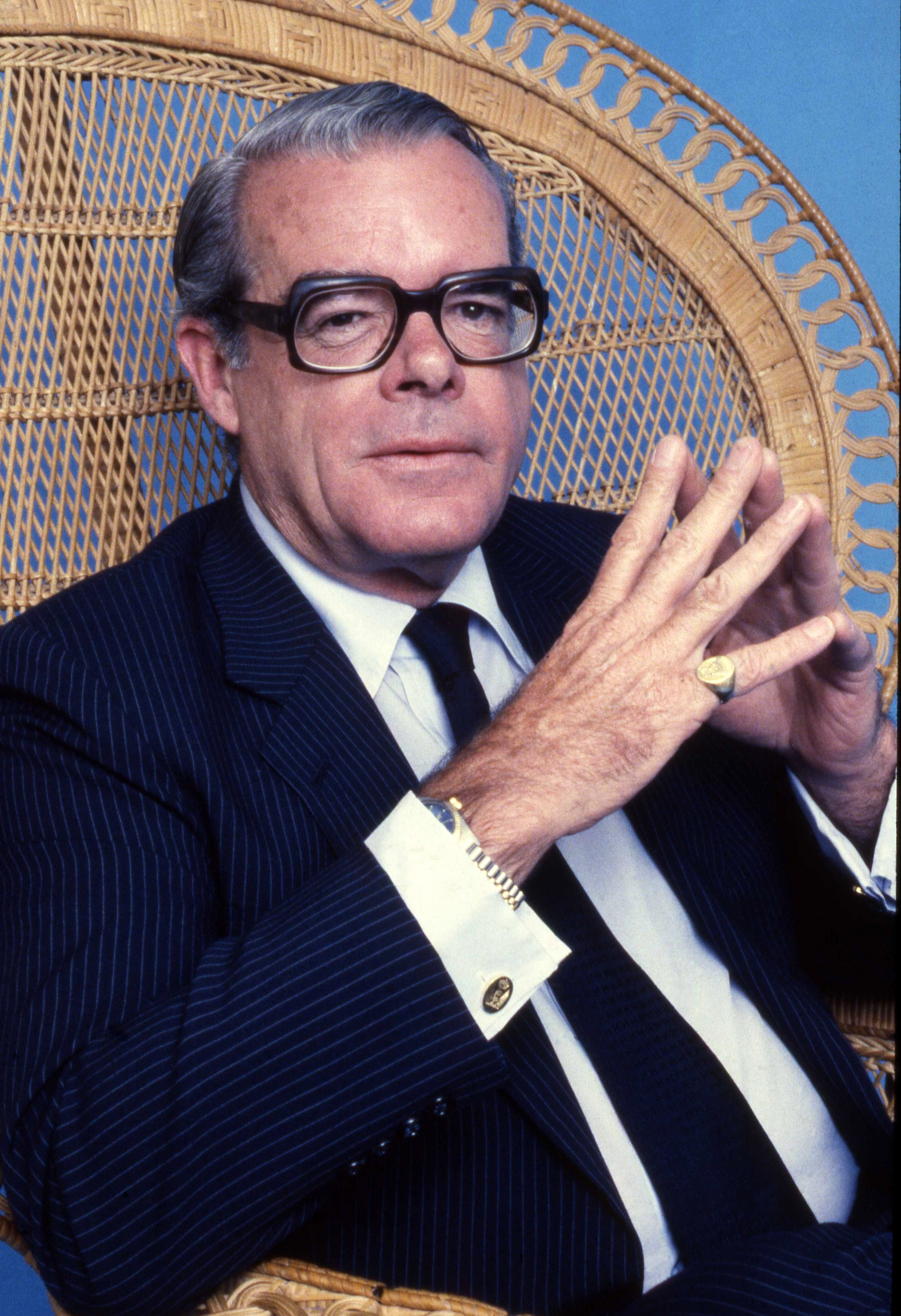
Sidney Montagu, 11th Duke of Manchester

- 1 June – Richard Greene, actor (born 1918)
- 2 June – George Brown, politician (born 1914)
- 3 June
  - Harry Kershaw, trade unionist (born 1906)
  - Sidney Montagu, 11th Duke of Manchester, peer (born 1929)
- 4 June – Samuel Segal, Baron Segal, Labour politician (born 1902)
- 7 June
  - John Percival Morton, civil servant (born 1911)
  - Gordon Rollings, British actor (born 1926)
- 8 June – Sir Henry Clay, 6th Baronet, engineer (born 1909)
- 9 June – Clifford Evans, actor (born 1912)
- 13 June – Dorothy Donaldson Buchanan, Scottish civil engineer (born 1899)
- 15 June
  - Percy Fender, cricketer (born 1892)
  - Felix Greene, journalist (born 1909)
  - Rodney Hallworth, journalist (born 1929)
  - Martin Willoughby Parr, colonial administrator (born 1892)
- 17 June
  - John Boulting, film director (born 1913)
  - James Cyriax, physician (born 1904)
- 22 June – Patricia Ward Hales, tennis player (born 1929)
- 24 June – Valentine Dyall, actor (born 1908)
- 27 June
  - William D. Clark, civil servant and economist (born 1916)
  - William Evans, Baron Energlyn, geologist (born 1912)
- 28 June – Denis Martin Cowley, judge (born 1919)
- 30 June – Sir Anthony Miers, Royal Navy rear-admiral (born 1906)

=== July ===
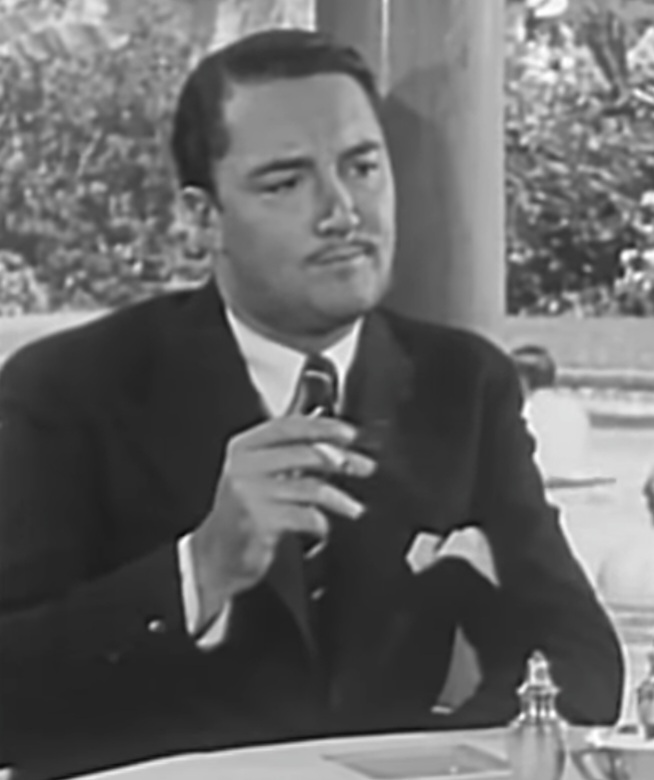
Henry Mollison

- 2 July
  - Hector Nicol, comedian, actor and singer (born 1920)
  - David Purley, racing driver (born 1945; air accident)
- 3 July – Patricia Hornsby-Smith, Baroness Hornsby-Smith, Conservative politician (born 1914)
- 5 July – Bladen Hawke, 9th Baron Hawke, peer and politician (born 1901)
- 8 July
  - Roger Baxter-Jones, mountaineer and alpine guide (born 1950; accident while climbing)
  - Frank Hampson, illustrator (born 1918)
  - Leslie Paul, writer (born 1905, Ireland)
- 9 July – Jimmy Kinnon, founder of Narcotics Anonymous (born 1911)
- 11 July – Gilbert Dempster Fisher, Scottish broadcaster (born 1906)
- 12 July
  - Sir Robertson Crichton, judge (born 1912)
  - Lettice Ramsey, photographer (born 1898)
  - Thomas Galbraith, 1st Baron Strathclyde, Scottish politician (born 1891)
- 16 July
  - Ursula Kathleen Hicks, Irish-born economist (born 1896)
  - Elsie Wagstaff, actress (born 1899)
- 18 July – Robert Raglan, actor (born 1909)
- 19 July – Henry Mollison, actor (born 1905)
- 21 July – Dorian Williams, equestrian, author and arts patron (born 1914)
- 22 July – Sir Peter Roberts, 3rd Baronet, Conservative politician (born 1912)
- 23 July
  - Rose Smith, communist activist (born 1891)
  - Johnny Wardle, cricketer (born 1923)
- 24 July – William Hall, 2nd Viscount Hall, businessman, first chairman of the Post Office (born 1913)
- 25 July – Stephen Knight, author and journalist (born 1951)
- 26 July – Sir Oliver Simmonds, aviation engineer and Conservative politician (born 1897)
- 30 July – Peter Knight, composer (born 1917)

=== August ===
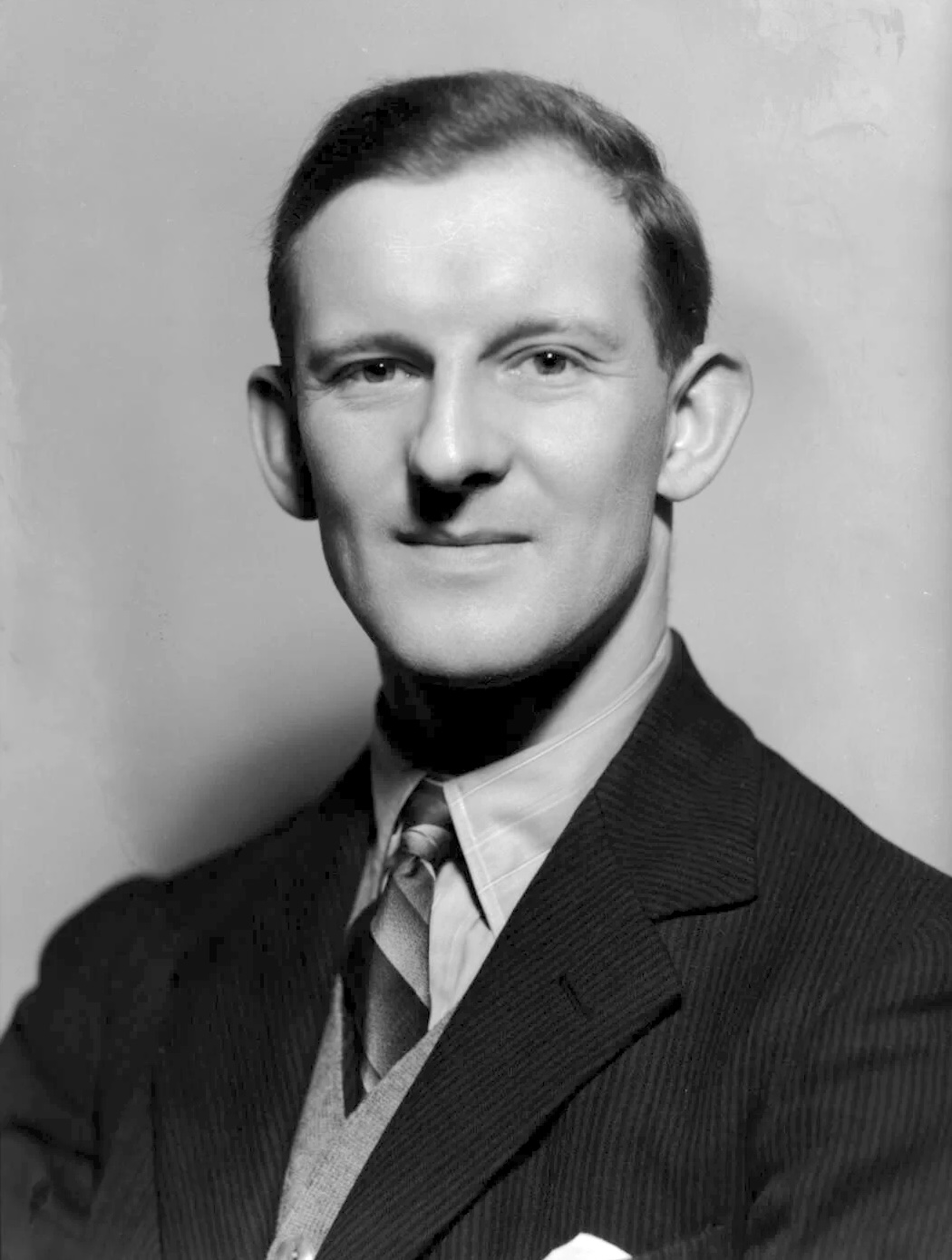
Arnold Wilkins

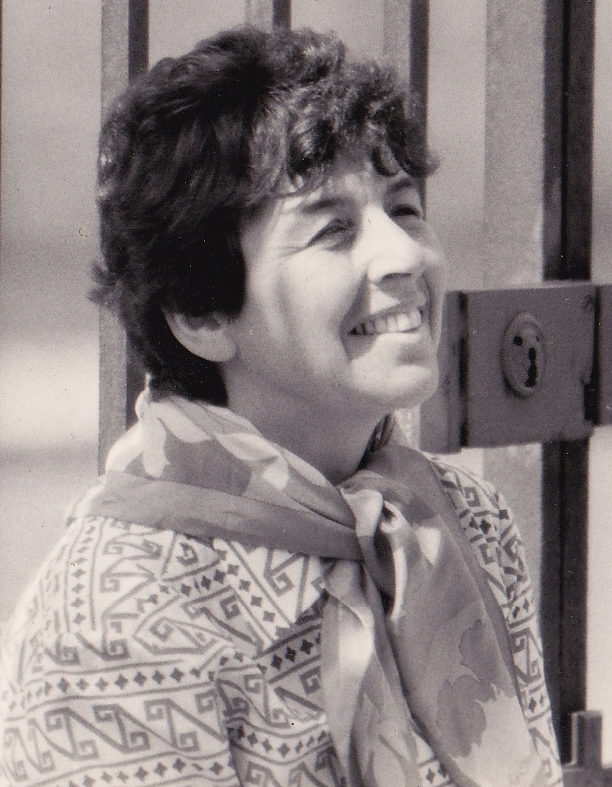
Joanne Cole

- 1 August – D. H. Turner, art historian (born 1931)
- 2 August
  - Richard Walker, angler and writer on angling (born 1918)
  - Ralph Younger, Army major-general (born 1904)
- 3 August
  - Eileen Beldon, actress (born 1901)
  - Robert Deakin, Anglican prelate (born 1917)
- 4 August
  - Maurice Petherick, Conservative politician (born 1894)
  - Pierre Young, mathematician and developer of Concorde (born 1926)
- 5 August – Arnold Wilkins, radar pioneer (born 1907)
- 6 August – William Anstruther-Gray, Baron Kilmany, Scottish soldier and politician (born 1905)
- 7 August
  - Joanne Cole, artist (born 1934)
  - Alan Fitch, Labour politician (born 1915)
- 11 August – Hector Grey, street trader and company director (born 1904)
- 12 August – Sir Harry Godwin, botanist and ecologist (born 1901)
- 13 August
  - Shiva Naipaul, journalist and brother of V. S. Naipaul (born 1940, Trinidad)
  - Paul Edward Paget, architect (born 1901)
- 14 August – Alfred Hayes, screenwriter (born 1911)
- 17 August – Lord Avon (Nicholas Eden), Conservative Member of Parliament and son of the late prime minister Anthony Eden (born 1930)
- 19 August – Edward Cooper, World War I veteran and VC recipient (born 1896)
- 21 August – Maxwell Shaw, actor (born 1929)
- 24 August
  - Colin Crompton, comedian (born 1931)
  - Noel Martin, Army brigadier-general (born 1892)
- 28 August – Hugh Norman-Walker, colonial official (born 1916)
- 29 August
  - Evelyn Ankers, actress (born 1918)
  - Patrick Barr, actor (born 1908)
- 30 August
  - Taylor Caldwell, British-born American author (born 1900)
  - Sir Euan Miller, Army lieutenant-general (born 1897)

=== September ===
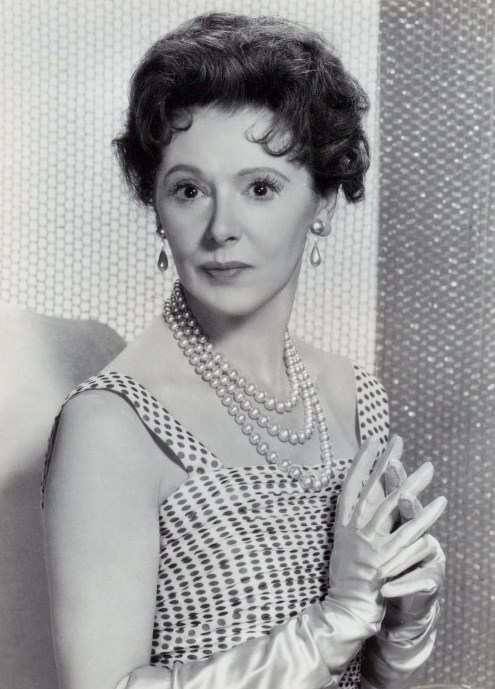
Isabel Jeans

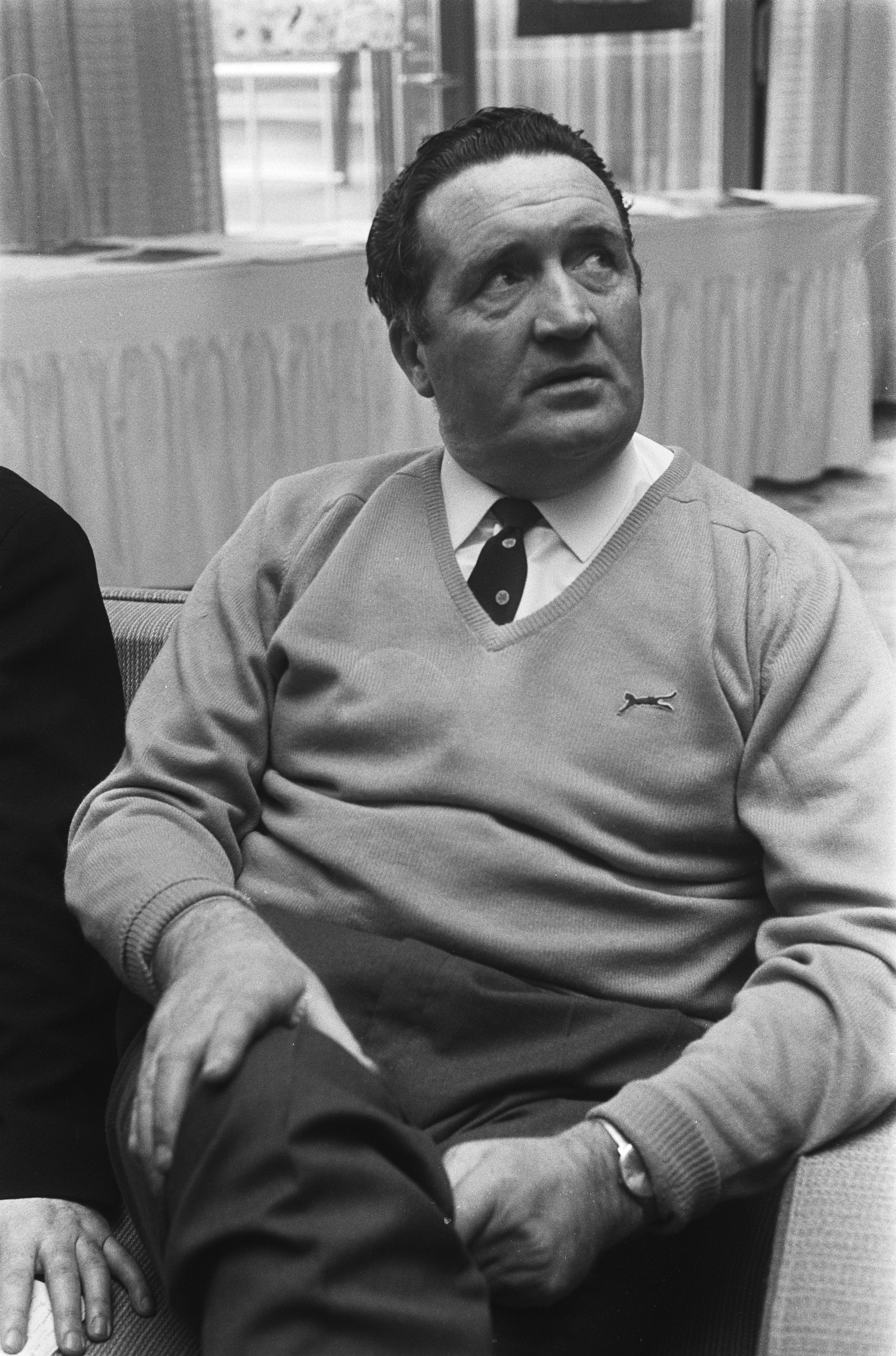
Jock Stein

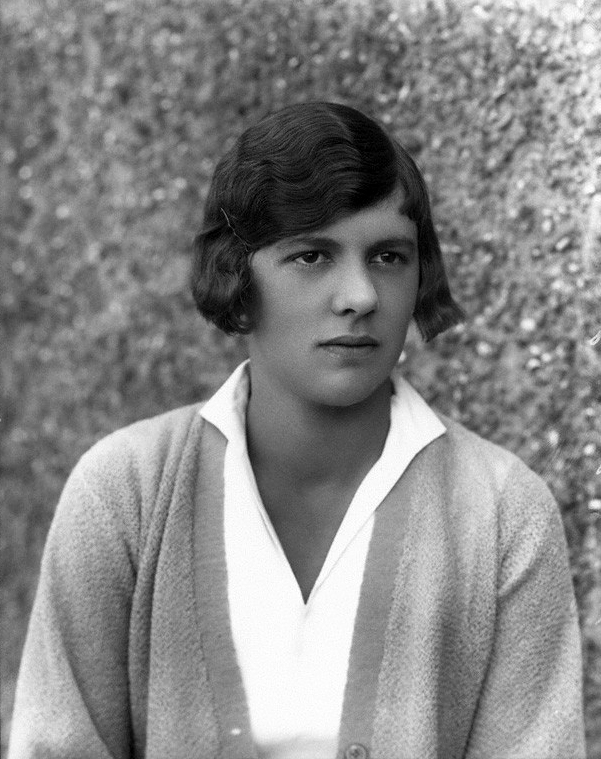
Joan Fry

- 1 September
  - Saunders Lewis, writer and founder of the Welsh National Party (Plaid Cymru) (born 1893)
  - Sir James Pitman, writer, civil servant and Conservative politician (born 1901)
  - Evelyn Sharp, Baroness Sharp, civil servant (born 1903)
- 3 September – Jocelyn Bonham-Carter, cricketer and Army officer (born 1904)
- 4 September – Isabel Jeans, actress (born 1891)
- 6 September – Rodney Robert Porter, biochemist, recipient of the Nobel Prize in Physiology or Medicine (born 1917)
- 7 September – Sir Ellis Waterhouse, art historian and museum director (born 1905)
- 9 September – John Baker, Baron Baker, scientist and structural engineer (born 1901)
- 10 September
  - Guy Thompson Griffith, ancient historian (born 1908)
  - Jock Stein, footballer and manager of Scotland (born 1922)
- 11 September
  - William Alwyn, composer (born 1905)
  - Henrietta Barnett, WRAF officer (born 1905)
- 17 September
  - Laura Ashley, designer (born 1925)
  - John Bowle, historian (born 1905)
- 18 September
  - Gerald Holtom, artist and designer (born 1914)
  - John Kingsley Read, far-right politician (born 1936)
- 22 September – Dickie Henderson, entertainer (born 1922)
- 26 September
  - John Patrick Micklethwait Brenan, botanist (born 1917)
  - Peter Craigie, Biblical scholar (born 1938; car accident)
- 27 September
  - Leonard Gribble, novelist (born 1908)
  - G. P. Wells, zoologist and author (born 1901)
- 28 September – Brian "Little Legs" Clifford, criminal (murdered) (born 1940)
- 29 September
  - Joan Fry, tennis player (born 1906)
  - Victor Gold, chemist (born 1922, Austria)
  - Aubrey Rodway Johnson, Hebrew scholar (born 1901)
  - Christine Campbell Thomson, horror fiction writer (born 1897)

=== October ===
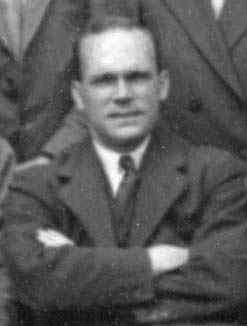
John Greenlees Semple

- 1 October
  - J. Grant Anderson, Scottish actor (born 1897)
  - Ninian Sanderson, Scottish racing driver (born 1925)
- 6 October – Keith Blakelock, Metropolitan Police officer (murdered) (born 1945)
- 9 October – Lionel George Higgins, lepidopterist (born 1891)
- 10 October – Doris Reynolds, geologist (born 1899)
- 11 October – Dorothy O'Grady, Nazi sympathiser (born 1897)
- 13 October – Sir Neville Faulks, barrister and judge (born 1908)
- 14 October
  - Kenneth Diplock, Baron Diplock, barrister and judge (born 1907)
  - Doris Odlum, psychiatrist (born 1890)
- 16 October – George Odey, Conservative politician (born 1900)
- 18 October – George Darling, Labour politician (born 1905)
- 23 October – John Greenlees Semple, mathematician (born 1904)
- 25 October – Gary Holton, singer-songwriter (born 1952)
- 26 October – Cecil Langley Doughty, comics artist (born 1913)
- 27 October – Walter Segal, architect (born 1907, German Empire)
- 28 October – Harold Davies, Baron Davies of Leek, Labour politician (born 1904)
- 29 October – Charles Douglas-Home, journalist (born 1937)
- 30 October
  - David Oxley, actor (born 1920)
  - Guy Pentreath, clergyman, teacher and writer (born 1902)

=== November ===
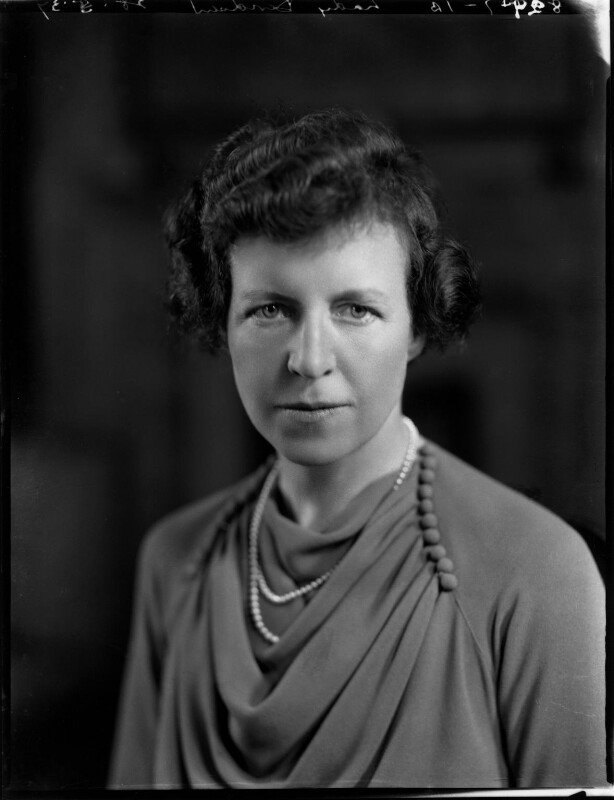
Frances Davidson, Viscountess Davidson

- 1 November – John Phillips, Anglican prelate (born 1910)
- 2 November – William Lummis, British military historian (born 1886)
- 3 November – Sir John Eldridge, Army general (born 1898)
- 4 November – Hilda Vaughan, novelist (born 1892)
- 5 November
  - Alexander Lloyd, 2nd Baron Lloyd, Conservative politician (born 1912)
  - William Tweddell, golfer (born 1897)
- 6 November
  - Hans Keller, Austrian-born British musician and writer (born 1919)
  - Sara Woods, crime fiction writer (born 1922)
- 7 November – Mary McCallum Webster, botanist (born 1906)
- 9 November – L. H. C. Tippett, statistician (born 1902)
- 10 November – Sir Peveril William-Powlett, Royal Navy vice-admiral (born 1898)
- 11 November – James Hanley, author (born 1897)
- 18 November – Sir Hugh Lucas-Tooth, Conservative politician (born 1903)
- 19 November – Evan Meredith Jenkins, colonial governor (born 1896)
- 21 November – Derek Jewell, journalist (born 1927)
- 23 November – Leslie Mitchell, announcer (born 1905)
- 25 November
  - Frances Davidson, Viscountess Davidson, Conservative politician (born 1894)
  - Geoffrey Grigson, author and poet (born 1905)
- 27 November – Peter Bessell, Liberal politician (born 1921)
- 29 November – Victor Henry, actor (born 1943)

=== December ===
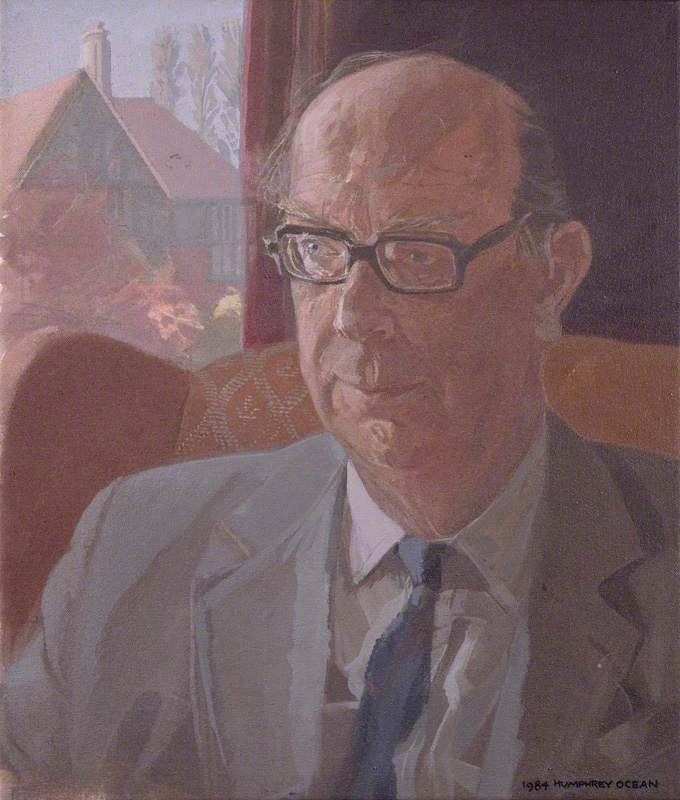
Philip Larkin

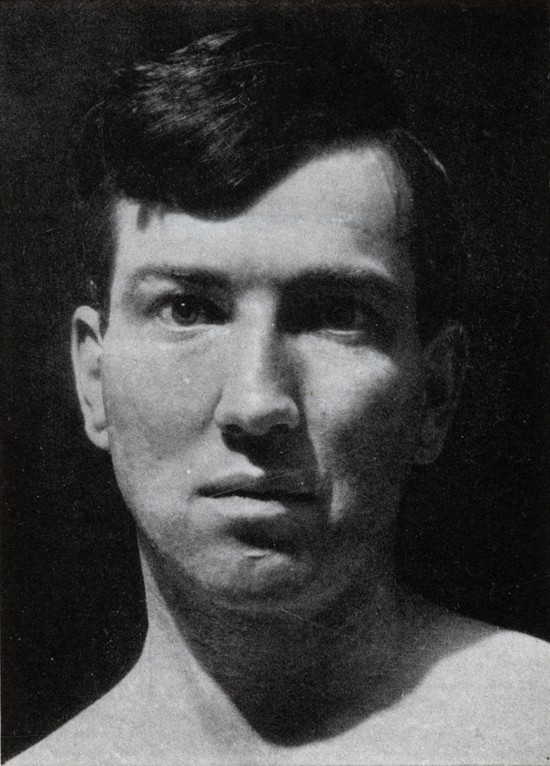
Robert Graves

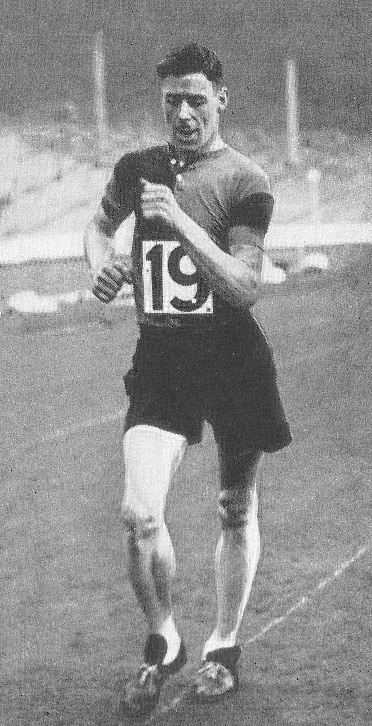
Harold Whitlock

- 2 December
  - Sir Charles Hughes-Hallett, Royal Navy vice-admiral (born 1898)
  - Philip Larkin, poet (born 1922)
- 3 December
  - Sir Conolly Abel Smith, Royal Navy vice-admiral (born 1899)
  - Bill Cox, golfer (born 1910)
- 7 December
  - Malcolm Dixon, biochemist (born 1899)
  - John Fallon, Scottish golfer (born 1913)
  - Robert Graves, writer, died on Majorca (born 1895)
- 8 December
  - Jack Pye, wrestler and film actor (born 1903)
  - Sir Harry Trusted, judge (born 1888)
- 9 December – Donald John Dean, Army colonel and VC recipient (born 1897)
- 10 December – Leslie Bonnet, RAF group captain, writer and duck breeder (born 1902)
- 11 December – Charles Armstrong, Army brigadier-general (born 1897)
- 12 December
  - Barry MacKay, actor (born 1906)
  - Ian Stewart, musician (born 1938)
- 13 December – Sir Hugh Forbes, judge (born 1917)
- 16 December – Claude Wardlaw, botanist (born 1901)
- 17 December – Sir Iain Maxwell Stewart, industrialist (born 1916)
- 22 December
  - Sir Neil Marten, Conservative politician (born 1916)
  - Michael Henry Wilson, musician, scientist and translator (born 1901)
- 23 December
  - Martin Beale, mathematician (born 1928)
  - Philip Mackie, screenwriter (born 1918)
- 24 December – John F. Carrington, missionary and translator (born 1914)
- 25 December – Sir James Marshall-Cornwall, Army general and historian (born 1887)
- 26 December – Maxwell Staniforth, railwayman and clergyman (born 1893)
- 27 December – Harold Whitlock, Olympic athlete (born 1903)
- 31 December – Jocelyn Toynbee, archaeologist and art historian (born 1897)

== See also ==
- 1985 in British music
- 1985 in British television
- List of British films of 1985
