= Lady Evans =

Lady Evans may refer to:

- Natalie Evans, Baroness Evans of Bowes Park (born 1975), politician
- The wife of a number of people with the title Lord Evans
- The wife of knights or baronets with the surname Evans, including
  - Tina Brown, wife of Sir Harold Evans
  - Maria Millington Lathbury (1856–1944), English classical scholar, archaeologist and numismatist.
