= Royal Philosophical Society of Glasgow =

- Formation: 1802
- Type: Learned society
- Headquarters: []
- Location: Glasgow
- President: Prof Pat Monaghan
- Main organ: Council
- Website: www.royalphil.org

The Royal Philosophical Society of Glasgow is a learned society established in the city of Glasgow, Scotland in 1802 "for the improvement of the Arts and Sciences". It runs a programme of lectures, starting its 222nd Series in October 2023. The Society formerly owned a building on Bath Street.

== History ==
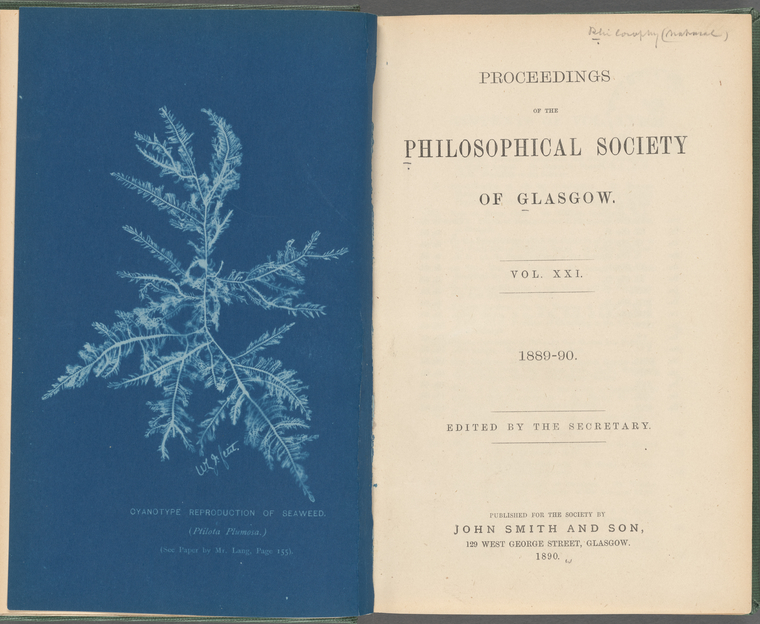
Cyanotype reproduction of seaweed (Ptilota Plumosa) and Title Page of Proceedings of the Royal Philosophical Society of Glasgow, Vol. XXI, 1889-90

The Society was founded in 1802 as the Glasgow Philosophical Society by a meeting of sixty people in the former Assembly Rooms, and work began establishing a library collection. The Society was housed in various short-term accommodation until 1831, when a room was made available in the Andersonian University (now the University of Strathclyde). The Society subsequently moved to the Corporation Galleries on Sauchiehall Street in 1868, and in 1880, in conjunction with the Institution of Engineers and Shipbuilders in Scotland, built new premises on Bath Street.

The Society was made a Royal Society in 1901, shortly before its centenary during the reign of Edward VII and while Archibald Campbell, 1st Baron Blythswood was President. In 1961, the Society's building was sold and the library, which by that time contained over five thousand volumes, dispersed. The Society has since provided its Lectures in both the University of Strathclyde, and the University of Glasgow. The archives of the Society are now maintained by the Archives of the University of Glasgow.

== Activities ==
The Society runs a programme of lectures through the year, including the Kelvin and Graham Lectures, commemorating physicist Lord Kelvin and chemist Thomas Graham respectively, and for which medals are awarded. Lord Kelvin was president of the Society and Thomas Graham Vice-President.

The Arts Medal was replaced in 2011 by the Minerva Medal. "Arts" was thought to be restrictive and it was decided that, as Minerva was goddess not only of wisdom but also of music, poetry, medicine, commerce, weaving, crafts and magic, her broad portfolio covers both Arts and Humanities. For example, a recent recipient (2021) is Alison Phipps OBE FRSE, refugee researcher and first UNESCO Chair in Refugee Integration through Languages and the Arts. The image of Minerva appearing on the medal is taken from the image carved on the President's chair which is on permanent loan to the University of Strathclyde.

Recordings of lectures in recent years are archived at the University of Strathclyde.

== Notable former presidents ==
- Thomas Anderson, chemist
- Archibald Campbell, 1st Baron Blythswood, politician
- James Bryce, 1st Viscount Bryce, politician
- William Gillies, nationalist
- Thomas Graham, chemist (Vice-President)
- John Graham Kerr, embryologist
- Lord Kelvin, physicist
- Professor Thomas Thomson, chemist
- David Templeton Gibson, chemist

== See also ==
- List of Royal Societies
- University of Glasgow
- University of Strathclyde
- Royal Society of Edinburgh
