= Lord Evans =

Lord Evans may refer to:

- Horace Evans, 1st Baron Evans (1903–1963), Welsh physician
- Gruffydd Evans, Baron Evans of Claughton (1928–1992), British solicitor and Liberal politician
- Ifor Evans, Baron Evans of Hungershall (1899–1982), British academic
- John Evans, Baron Evans of Parkside (1930–2016), British Labour politician
- Graham Evans, Baron Evans of Rainow (born 1963), British Conservative politician
- David Evans, Baron Evans of Sealand (born 1961), British Labour politician
- Matthew Evans, Baron Evans of Temple Guiting (1941–2016), British Labour politician
- David Evans, Baron Evans of Watford (born 1942), British publisher, entrepreneur and philanthropist
- Jonathan Evans, Baron Evans of Weardale (born 1958), Director General of MI5 from 2007 to 2013

== See also ==
- Natalie Evans, Baroness Evans of Bowes Park (born 1975), Leader of the House of Lords from 2016 to 2022
- William Evans, Baron Energlyn (1912–1985), Welsh geologist
- Baron Mountevans, surnamed Evans
