= Duane Goodfield =

Welsh rugby union footballer

- Born: Duane Goodfield; 17 February 1985 (age 41) Beddau, Rhondda Cynon Taf, Wales
- Height: 5 ft 11 in (1.80 m)
- Weight: 16 st 3 lb (103 kg)
- School: Ysgol Gyfun Rhydfelen
- University: Glamorgan University

Rugby union career
- Position: Hooker
- Current team: Cardiff Blues
Youth career
- Beddau
Senior career
Years	Team	Apps	(Points)
2002–2011	Pontypridd		
–	Cardiff Blues	37	
–	Newport Gwent Dragons	12	

Duane Goodfield (born 17 February 1985 in Beddau, near Llantrisant Wales) is a Welsh rugby union player. A Hooker, he played for Pontypridd RFC and Cardiff Blues and in April 2008 it was announced that he would join Newport Gwent Dragons, where he played for the 2009–10 season. He retired at the end of the 2010–11 season after several shoulder surgeries. From 2012–14, he was WRU Rugby Development Officer. From 2014–18, he was Cardiff Blues' Academy Coach. From 2018–21, he was Cardiff Blues' scrum coach. In 2023, he began working for Hospital innovations, a medical equipment company. In 2025, it was announced that he would be the forwards coach Cardiff University Men’s Rugby Club, following Nick Fish stepping down.
