= John Percival Morton =

Jack Morton CMG OBE
- Born: 15 May 1911
- Died: 7 June 1985 (aged 74); Wokingham, Berkshire
- Education: Bedford Modern School

John Percival Morton CMG OBE (1911–1985), known as Jack Morton, was Assistant Undersecretary of State at the Ministry of Defence between 1968 and 1971. He also had a distinguished career in the Indian Police where he was awarded the Indian Police Medal twice for gallantry (1935 and 1940) and the Indian Bar (1940). He was made OBE in 1946 and CMG in 1965.

== Life ==
John Percival Morton was born on 15 May 1911, and educated at Bedford Modern School.

Morton started his career in the Indian Police and was awarded the Indian Police Medal for gallantry twice, in 1935 and 1940, in the Special Branch of the CID and in the Central Intelligence Bureau. He was awarded the Indian Bar in 1940 and was appointed Chief of the Lahore Police in 1945 where 'his exceptional qualities of leadership were called upon in full measure, because this very large force had to face the fearful problems which arose from the approach of Indian Independence'. He was made OBE in 1946.

After Indian’s Independence in 1947 he was posted to London as ‘Principal, War Office’. Leon Comber has stated that this position was a cover for MI5 which concurs with Morton's obituary in The Times. He was made a Companion of the Order of St Michael and St George in 1965, and was later Assistant Undersecretary of State at the Ministry of Defence between 1968 and 1971.

Morton was sent by the Director General MI5 to Sri Lanka in 1979, as Director of Intelligence under Sir Gerald Templer, following a request by the Sri Lankan President to the Foreign Office for a British security expert to advise the Sri Lanka government on dealing with the Tamil militancy. Following Morton’s visit, and on his recommendation, a team from the British SAS visited Sri Lanka in 1981 to train the new Commando Regiment in counter-terrorist operations.

After retirement Morton took on several assignments including one in Northern Ireland to reorganise the Special Branch of the Royal Ulster Constabulary. Morton also served as Chairman of the Civil Service Commission Board and made several television appearances on the grant of independence to countries in the British Empire. His obituary in The Times stated that 'Morton's outstanding characteristic was his integrity'.

He married Leonora Margaret Sale in 1939 and they had a son and a daughter. He died in 1985 in Wokingham, Berkshire.
