= Jocelyn Bonham-Carter =

English cricketer, British Army officer and civil servant (1904–1985)

Personal information
- Full name: Jocelyn Henry Bonham-Carter
- Born: 28 January 1904; Bromley, Kent, England
- Died: 3 September 1985 (aged 81); High Wycombe, Buckinghamshire, England
- Batting: Unknown

Domestic team information
- Years: Team
- 1927/28: Europeans

Career statistics
Competition	First-class
Matches	1
Runs scored	3
Batting average	3.00
100s/50s	–/–
Top score	3
Catches/stumpings	–/–
- Source: ESPNcricinfo, 19 May 2023

Jocelyn Henry Bonham-Carter OBE (28 January 1904 – 3 September 1985) was an English first-class cricketer, British Army officer and civil servant.

The son of Herman Bonham-Carter, he was born at Bromley in January 1904. He was educated at the Britannia Royal Naval College, before matriculating to Caius College, Cambridge. Bonham-Carter joined the Royal Tank Corps (later the Royal Tank Regiment) as a second lieutenant following the completion of his studies, before resigning his commission in June 1926. Travelling to British India, he made a single appearance in first-class cricket for the Europeans cricket team against the Indians at Madras in the 1927–28 Madras Presidency Match. Batting once in the match, he was dismissed for 3 runs in the Europeans first innings by C. R. Ganapathy.

Bonham-Carter rejoined the British Army in December 1932, when he was appointed to the Queen's Own Royal West Kent Regiment with the rank of lieutenant. He served in the Second World War with the Middlesex Regiment. Following the war, he was employed with the Foreign Office as a Grade 1 Conference Officer. For his service with the Foreign Office, he was made an OBE in the 1953 New Year Honours. He remained an officer with the Middlesex Regiment as part of the Territorial Reserve, gaining his Territorial Decoration whilst holding the rank of captain in June 1954. Bonham-Carter died at High Wycombe in September 1985. He had been married to Maud Leslie Athill since 1939, in a wedding which was presided over by the Bishop of Woolwich.
