= Mary McCallum Webster =

Botanist

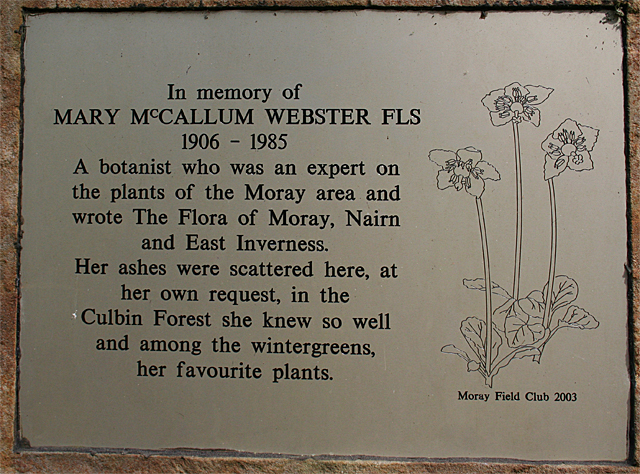
Plaque to Mary McCallum Webster on her memorial stone in Culbin Forest (photo: Anne Burgess)

Mary McCallum Webster (31 December 1906 – 7 November 1985) was a British botanist. She was a Fellow of the Linnean Society of London. She collected plant specimens in Scotland and Africa, and published the Flora of Moray, Nairn and East Inverness in 1978, which was the result of fifty years of study.

== Early life and education ==
McCallum Webster was born in Sussex on 31 December 1906. Her grandparents were Scottish, and her grandmother was botanist Mary Louisa Wedgewood (née Bell, 1854–1953). McCallum Webster was interested in botany from childhood, and joined the Wildflower Society in 1915. McCallum was educated by private governesses, then at boarding school, and then attended a finishing school in Brussels. McCallum Webster initially trained as a children's nurse, however she retrained at Aldershot as a cook in order to join the Auxiliary Territorial Service in World War II. She was also a talented tennis player, winning the North of Scotland Ladies' Open Singles tennis title four years in a row, and qualifying for Wimbledon.

== Career ==
McCallum Webster continued to work as a cook after the war, spending winters working and summers focusing on botany. She worked for the School of Botany, Cambridge University, and the Royal Botanic Gardens, Kew, and contributed information for the Scottish section of the Atlas of the British Flora and to the Flora of West Sutherland. McCallum Webster was a member of several botany focused groups, including the Botanical Society of Britain and Ireland, Botanical Society of Scotland, and the Moray Field Club, as well as being a Fellow of the Linnean Society of London from 1960 to 1974.

Webster travelled through Africa in 1958, beginning in Natal, where she had a brother, and encompassing Tanganyika and Zimbabwe. The 5,000 specimens she collected during the trip were donated to Kew Gardens.

Wintergreens were a particular area of interest for McCallum Webster, as noted on her memorial in Culbin Forest. Some have claimed that while McCallum Webster was an expert on wintergreens particularly in the Moray region of Scotland, she was deliberately vague about the exact sites of her finds and that botanists were taken to sites by Webster "on a deliberately tortuous route along forest tracks which made relocation practically impossible". In 1978 McCallum Webster published the Flora of Moray, Nairn and East Inverness in 1978, which was the result of fifty years of study.

McCallum Webster died on 7 November 1985. Her remaining botanical collections were shared between Aberdeen University, the Botany School of Cambridge and the Royal Botanical Garden in Edinburgh.

== Works ==
- Flora of Moray, Nairn and East Inverness, 1978. ISBN 9780900015427
