= Annis Gillie =

British physician and medical researcher

Dame Annis Gillie DBE FRCGP
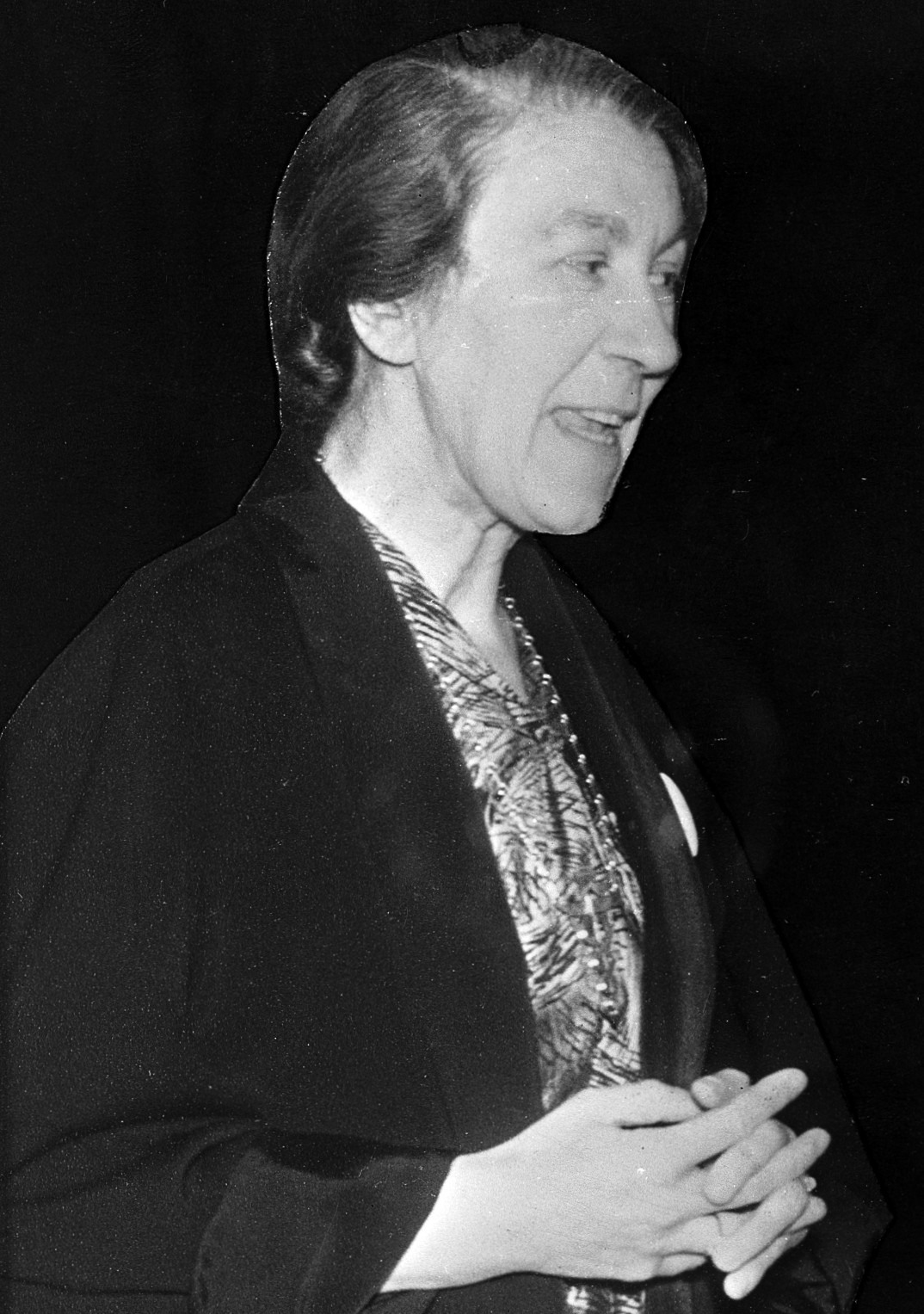
- Dame Annis Gillie
- Born: Katharine Annis Calder Gillie; 3 August 1900; Eastbourne, England
- Died: 10 April 1985 (aged 84); Bledington, England
- Education: University College London
- Occupation: general practitioner
- Known for: First woman Vice Chair of the British Medical Association; Founder member of the Royal College of General Practitioners and first Chair of the College

Dame Katharine Annis Calder Gillie DBE FRCGP (3 August 1900 in Eastbourne– 10 April 1985 in Bledington, Oxfordshire) was a British physician and medical researcher. She was President of the Royal College of General Practitioners and the first woman to serve as vice-chair of the British Medical Association (BMA). The third BMA committee on general practice was set up in 1961 under Gillie and was charged with guiding the general practice in the United Kingdom.

== Biography ==
Gillie was the eldest daughter and first of the four children of Emily Genn Dalrymple (née Japp) and Dr Robert Calder Gillie, a minister in the Presbyterian Church of England.

She attended school at Wycombe Abbey, going on to study at University College London and University College Hospital, graduating in medicine with an MB BS in 1925. In 1927, she became member of the Royal College of Physicians.

During World War II, she moved with her two children to a country cottage at Pangbourne, continuing her medical work there until retirement in 1963. Gillie was noted for helping recover UK general practice after World War II. She was a member of the General Medical Council (1946–1948) and president of the Medical Women's Federation (1954–1955).

She was a member of the Medical Practices Committee, Executive Council of London, Standing Medical Advisory Committee, Central Health Services Advisory Council, BMA central ethical committee, and BMA council (1950–1964). Beginning in 1968, and for several years, she served as BMA vice-chair, the first woman to hold the position.

She was a founder member of the Royal College of General Practitioners and the college's chairperson from 1959 to 1962. In 1961–63, she chaired a sub-committee set up by the Standing Medical Advisory Committee to guide the development of general practice in Britain, known as the Gillie Report. Earlier in 1964 she was elected a Fellow of the Royal College of General Practitioners. She served on the North West Metropolitan Regional Hospital Board and on the Oxford Regional Hospital Board.

== Awards and honours ==
Gillie received the Order of the British Empire (OBE) in 1961, and was promoted to Dame Commander of the Order of the British Empire (DBE) in 1968.

She was awarded an honorary MD degree by the University of Edinburgh in 1968.

== Personal life ==
In 1930, Gillie married Percy (Peter) Chandler Smith, an architect. His architectural practice was destroyed during the war. Together they had a daughter, who also went into medicine, and a son.

Later in life Smith was diagnosed with multiple sclerosis and depended much on Gillie in his later years. Smith died in 1983.

Gillie died at her home in Bledington, Oxfordshire on 10 April 1985, aged 84.

== Sources ==
- The Field of Work of the Family Doctor (The Gillie Report), Central Health Services Council, Standing Medical Advisory Committee. London: 1963.
