= Guy Thompson Griffith =

English classical scholar

Guy Thompson Griffith, FBA (7 January 1908 – 10 September 1985) was an English ancient historian and classicist. He was a fellow of Gonville and Caius College, Cambridge, from 1931 to his death, and the Laurence Reader in Classics at the University of Cambridge between 1951 and 1975.

The Griffith family had become wealthy through making locomotive springs in Sheffield. Guy attended The Leys School in Cambridge and then Gonville and Caius College, Cambridge, where he read classics and was taught by W. T. Vesey and Bertrand Hallward. Graduating with a first-class degree, Griffith was awarded a studentship and studied German in Vienna.

In 1931, he was elected to a research fellowship at Gonville and Caius. Initially, he studied ancient Greek soldiers; two years later, he won the Hare Prize for an essay on the topic and in 1935 he published Mercenaries of the Hellenistic World. Appointed a university lecturer in 1937, he began focusing on fourth-century Greek history but his work at Cambridge was interrupted by service in the Royal Air Force Volunteer Reserve from 1941 to 1945. At the end of the Second World War, he returned to teaching at the university and his college, and was appointed co-editor of The Classical Quarterly in 1947 (remaining in office until 1951). He was appointed the Laurence Reader in Classics in 1951. The following year, he co-edited (with Tarn) the third edition of W. W. Tarn's Hellenistic Civilisation. Having turned some attention to Alexander the Great, he edited Alexander the Great: The Main Problems (1966). In 1975, he retired from his readership and lectureship, though remained a fellow of his college. He had been elected a fellow of the British Academy in 1952. Griffith died in 1985.
