= Foster Neville Woodward =

British chemist (1905–1985)

Foster Neville Woodward FRSE FRIC (1905–1985) was a 20th-century British chemist involved in the creation of chemical weapons in the Second World War.

== Life ==
He was born on 2 May 1905 the son of Foster Woodward. He studied chemistry at the University of London.

In 1930 he joined the Sutton Oak Chemical Defence Research Establishment on Reginald Road in St Helens, Merseyside. This establishment was Britain's primary poison gas manufacturer, making large quantities of mustard gas. The 20-acre site was impossible to hide, and despite attempts at secrecy the plant was known as the "Poison Gas Works" or the "Magnum" (its former name). It had transformed from the Magnum Steelworks to the United Kingdom Chemical Products Company in 1915, and had first begun work on chemical weapons. A loophole in the wording of the Third Geneva Convention in 1925 (relating to chemical weapons) allowed countries to produce such products for research or defence purposes. The company was therefore named to cover this pretence.

He created a variant of mustard gas calle "HT" or "Runcol". In 1932 he left and was replaced by Prof Robinson. He returned in 1937 as head of research. At the outbreak of war in 1939 they were placed under the control of the Ministry of Supply, under the control of Leslie Hore-Belisha. In 1940 most poison gas production was relocated to Rhydymwyn in North Wales, but Sutton Oak continued as the primary research establishment. A programme of expansion and modernisation began. Prof James B. Conant visited the facility in 1942, to offer American advice. A continuing high accident rate at the facility was blamed on individuals not following safety procedures, but underlying safety protocol was clearly poor in terms of minimising health risk to workers.

Research includes creation of the deadly German poisons, sarin (GB) and ethyl sarin (GE), which always required a doctor present whilst handling. Creating around 50 kg of these toxins per week, production clearly exceeded the needs of pure research, but it is unclear why such high amounts were created.

In 1949 he was elected a Fellow of the Royal Society of Edinburgh. His proposers were Sir Edmund Hirst, Edmund Percival, William Murdoch Cumming and Sir Patrick Ramsay Laird.

In 1949 Woodward saw the relocation of most of the Sutton Oak nerve agent process to Nancekuke airfield near Redruth in Cornwall.

In 1956 he was created a Commander of the Order of the British Empire (CBE).

From 1956 to 1971 he was director of the Arthur D. Little Research Institute in Inveresk, east of Edinburgh. He was also chairman of Biotech Consulting Ltd.

He died on 3 May 1985, the day after his 80th birthday.

== Publications ==
- Memoirs of a Peripatetic Technologist (1985)
- Structure of Industrial Research Associations (1965)

== Family ==
In 1932 he married Elizabeth Holme Siddall.
