= John Greenlees Semple =

British mathematician (1904–1985)

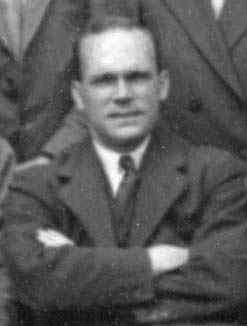

John Greenlees Semple (10 June 1904 in Belfast, Ireland – 23 October 1985 in London, England) was a British mathematician working in algebraic geometry.

== Academic career ==
He attended the Royal Belfast Academical Institution, and then received an undergraduate degree from Queen's University, Belfast, graduating in 1925 with First Class honours in mathematics. After this he went to Cambridge where he sat the Mathematical Tripos of 1927, gaining a distinction, and went on to study for a doctorate at St John's College, Cambridge, where he was taught by H. F. Baker, which was awarded in 1930.

He won the Rayleigh Prize in 1929, and became a lecturer at the University of Edinburgh for a year. He was briefly elected a fellow of St John's College, before taking the position of Chair of Pure Mathematics at Queen's University, Belfast in 1930. He held the position for six years, remaining active as both a researcher and an administrator, and became Dean of the Faculty of the Arts. In 1936 he became Chair of Pure Mathematics at King's College, London - leading the department through its relocation to Bristol during WWII - and in 1956 was made Head of Mathematics at the same institution, continuing until his retirement in 1969.

== Personal life ==
Semple was the third of his parents' five children; two of his siblings also became professors in British universities. He married Daphne Hummel, the daughter of a colleague, in Belfast. They had two children, John and Jessie, who entered medicine and the arts respectively.

He enjoyed reading, gardening and golf.

== Publications ==
- Semple, J. G.; Roth, L. (1985), Introduction to algebraic geometry, Oxford Science Publications, The Clarendon Press Oxford University Press, ISBN 978-0-19-853363-4, MR 0814690
- Algebraic Projective Geometry. By J. G. Semple and G. T. Kneebone. Pp. viii, 404. 35s. 1952. (Oxford University Press).
