= Henry J. Wilson (farmer) =

Colonel Henry James Wilson CBE TD (10 June 1904 – 26 March 1985), known as both Harry and Jock, worked in the London County and Westminster Bank prior to his military career. After the war was over he worked in the War Office Commission reviewing sentences on war criminals. At this time he was appointed an OBE. He retired in 1949 and made a new career as a farmer in Battle in Sussex and was then appointed a CBE for his services to agriculture. His successful career and promotion through the ranks are noteworthy.

== 1920s ==
Henry (Harry) Wilson enlisted into the London Scottish in 1923 and served throughout the inter-war years in the unit which was part of the Territorial Army. It was allied to the Gordon Highlanders who historically provided some of its Permanent Staff. As a consequence there was a considerable interchange of personnel during the Second World War.

== 1930s ==
He was promoted to Lieutenant on 18 April 1934 and then to Captain on 7 March 1936. He spent some years in the ranks before being commissioned as a Second Lieutenant, although that date is unknown. In April 1939 the Territorial Army was authorised to double in size and consequently the original unit became 1st Battalion, London Scottish.

== 1940s ==
By March 1940 Henry had been put in charge of the regiment's Recruit Training Company at Folkestone with the rank of Major and in April 1941 had been posted to 1st Battalion as second-in-command. This was followed in August 1941 by being given command of the battalion with the rank of Lt Colonel.

At the beginning of March 1943 Harry attended a Senior Officers Course at the Middle East Training Centre and did not rejoin his unit until the beginning of May. Harry, in the meantime, had been appointed an OBE for his services which was announced in The London Gazette of 5 August 1943. He also had a short spell of leave in Egypt at this time. However once back in Italy with his battalion, he contracted malaria and had to be evacuated on 26 October and did not return until 13 November and resumed command.

During this time the 1st Battalion had been in constant action and in fact saw the only Victoria Cross won by the Gordon Highlanders and the London Scottish during the entire war, whilst under Harry's command. It was awarded to Pte George Allan Mitchell for his bravery during the night of 23/24 January 1944.

Shortly afterwards Harry left the 1st Battalion to take up a series of appointments with the Army Welfare Service which was to last between 9 February 1944 until 30 September 1949 firstly in Italy, then the Middle East, and finally the War Office in London. During this time he was promoted to the rank of Colonel.

== Appointments Achieved ==
- Lance Corporal – 1924
- Transport Seargent – 1925
- 2nd Lieutenant – 1931
- Lieutenant – 1934
- Captain – 1936

Captain Harry Wilson has served in every rank up to that he at present holds. So far "Scottish" is concerned there are only three more ranks he can serve in.

— The London Scottish Regimental Gazette No 498 – June 1937.

He subsequently achieved the ranks of:

- Major
- Lieutenant Colonel
- Colonel

== Farming career ==
Wilson was a prominent members of the National Farmers' Union of England and Wales, serving on the council from 1954, and as deputy president from 1959 to 1962 and treasurer from 1971 to 1981. He was also chairman of the Bacon Consultative Council from 1957 to 1964.
