= Edith Batten =

British welfare worker and educationist

"Mollie" Batten
- Born: Edith Mary Batten; 8 February 1905; London, England
- Died: 7 January 1985 (aged 79); Midhurst, England
- Occupations: welfare worker and educationist

Edith Mary "Mollie" Batten OBE (8 February 1905 – 7 January 1985) was a British welfare worker and educationist.

== Life ==
Batten was born in London in 1905. Her father, Charles William Batten, was a draper and he was married to Edith Wallis (born Black) and she was the third of their four children. After attending Southport High School for Girls she gained a degree in chemistry from the University of Liverpool in 1925. Her first job then was not in chemistry but at the biscuit company, McVitie and Price, Ltd. She was sacked as an assistant to the Personnel manager at their Hendon plant after she disagreed with another employee losing their job.

Batten went to evening classes at the London School of Economics and she gained a second degree, this time in Economics in 1932. At the same time as studying economics she had become a member and was confirmed in the Church of England.

She became the secretary of the Birmingham Settlement in 1933. The Birmingham Settlement is a charity that helps people in Birmingham who are facing challenges. In this position she came to national notice and she had a transforming effect on the charity she was employed by.

The British Association of Residential Settlements had Batten as their organising secretary in 1938. This association which had been formed in 1920 was known for its role in leading change in the nature of social work. Batten submitted evidence to support Ellen Wilkinson's The Hire Purchase Act of 1938 which curtailed the power of lenders so that they had to give notice before entering a purchaser's house and that they had to clearly state the whole price that a purchaser would eventually pay.

During the war she worked on the call up of women in London to assist the war effort. She was asked to join the civil service but decided instead to take a third degree in theology at St Anne's College, Oxford. She was awarded an OBE in 1948.

In 1950 she went to work as the Principal of the William Temple College that was based in Hawarden in Flintshire. The college had been intended to train women and as a memorial to William Temple who had died as Archbishop of Canterbury at the age of 62. The established church in Britain gave it little attention, but she had strong support from the Bishop of Sheffield who was chair of the college's governors. Batten moved the college to Rugby in 1954. She was able to attract leading speakers to the many who were trained there.

In 1961 she was raising some debate about the role of the church.

Batten died in 1985 in Midhurst.
