= David Templeton Gibson =

British chemist

David Templeton Gibson FRSE (1899–1985) was a British chemist who spent his entire career at the University of Glasgow.

== Life ==
He was born in Ireland on 23 November 1899, the son of Thomas Henry Gibson, a barrister, and his wife, Jessie Templeton. He attended Bangor Grammar School then his family moved to Scotland where he attended Ayr Academy from 1910-1917. He then returned to Ireland to study Science at the University of Belfast graduating MSc in 1921. He then went to the University of London for postgraduate studies gaining his first doctorate (PhD) in 1923.

He spent his entire career thereafter at Glasgow University beginning as an Assistant Lecturer in Chemistry in 1924.

The University of Glasgow awarded him an honorary doctorate (DSc) in 1932 and he was then raised to a Lecturer in Inorganic Chemistry. In 1949 he became a Senior Lecturer in Medical Chemistry.

In the Second World War he advised the RAF on gas warfare. In 1956 he was elected a Fellow of the Royal Society of Edinburgh. His proposers were John Monteath Robertson, Robert Campbell Garry, James Norman Davidson and Philip Ivor Dee.

He retired in 1965. He died on 6 March 1985.

== Family ==
In 1934 he married Elizabeth Mary Nisbet Wilson.
