= William Evans, Baron Energlyn =

British geologist (1912–1985)

William David Evans, Baron Energlyn (25 December 1912 – 27 June 1985) was a Welsh geologist who became a life peer.

Evans attended Caerphilly Grammar School and then University College Cardiff, before working for the Geological Survey of Great Britain. In 1945, he joined the Regional Survey Board of Ministry of Fuel and Power for the South Wales Coalfield, then in 1947 he became a lecturer at the University College of South Wales and Monmouthshire. In 1949, he moved to the University of Nottingham, becoming dean of the faculty of pure science, and then professor of geology.

Evans discovered vitricin, an antibiotic which could be obtained from coal, and developed several new geological techniques, including pyrochromotography, photogrammetry, and membrane colorimetry. He published a number of books on geology, and also studied diseases caused by coal dust.

On 10 July 1968, Evans was created a life peer as Baron Energlyn, of Caerphilly in the County of Glamorgan.
