= 1983 in the United Kingdom =

Events from the year 1983 in the United Kingdom.

== Incumbents ==
- Monarch – Elizabeth II
- Prime Minister – Margaret Thatcher (Conservative)

== Events ==
=== January ===
- 1 January – The British Nationality Act 1981 comes into effect creating five classes of British nationality.
- 3 January – Children's ITV is launched as a new branding for the late afternoon programming block on the ITV network.
- 5 January – Two policemen and a policewoman drown at Blackpool after going into the sea to rescue a man who entered the sea to save his dog (both of whom also drown).
- 6 January – Danish fishermen defy the British government's prohibition on non-UK boats fishing in its coastal waters.
- 14 January – Shooting of Stephen Waldorf: Armed policemen shoot and severely injure an innocent car passenger in London, believing him to be escaped prisoner David Martin.
- 17 January – The first British breakfast television programme, Breakfast Time, is launched on BBC One at 6:30AM.
- 19 January – The two policemen who wounded Stephen Waldorf are charged with attempted murder and released on bail; they are suspended from duty pending further investigation.
- 23 January – The prohibition on non-British boats fishing in British waters is lifted as the European Economic Community's Common Fisheries Policy comes into effect.
- 25 January – The Infrared Astronomical Satellite, the first-ever space-based observatory to perform a survey of the entire sky at infrared wavelengths, is launched. The satellite is a joint project between the American space agency NASA, the Netherlands Agency for Aerospace Programmes and the UK's Science and Engineering Research Council.
- 26 January – Red rain falls in the UK, caused by sand from the Sahara Desert in the droplets.
- 28 January – Escaped prisoner David Martin (for whom Stephen Waldorf was mistaken) is rearrested.
- 31 January – Seatbelt use for drivers and front seat passengers becomes mandatory, 11 years after becoming compulsory equipment in new cars.

=== February ===
- February – Work begins on extending the Piccadilly line of London Underground at Heathrow Airport to serve the new Terminal 4.
- 1 February – TV-am launches on ITV.
- 3 February – Unemployment stands at a record high of 3,224,715 – though the previous high reached in the Great Depression of the early 1930s accounted for a higher percentage of the workforce.
- 10 February – Dismembered sets of human remains are found at a block of flats in Muswell Hill, North London. 37-year-old civil servant Dennis Nilsen is arrested on suspicion of murder.
- 11 February – Dennis Nilsen is charged with the murder of 20-year-old Stephen Sinclair, who was last seen alive in January. Police are working to identify the other sets of human remains found at Nilsen's flat, in order to press further murder charges against Nilsen; his trial will open in October.
- 14 February – Roger Hargreaves' Little Miss TV series is first broadcast on BBC1.
- 15 February – The Austin Metro is now Britain's best selling car, having outsold every other new car registered in the UK during January.
- 24 February – Bermondsey by-election: Simon Hughes (Liberal) defeats Peter Tatchell (Labour) with the largest by-election swing in British political history (44.2%) following a campaign characterised by homophobia. The Official Monster Raving Loony Party first contests an election under this label.
- 26 February – Pat Jennings, 37-year-old Arsenal and Northern Ireland goalkeeper, becomes the first player in the English game to appear in 1,000 senior football matches.

=== March ===
- March – The compact disc (CD) goes on sale in the United Kingdom.
- 1 March – British Leyland launches the Austin Maestro, a five-door family hatchback with front-wheel drive which replaces the recently discontinued Maxi and Allegro. The Maestro also forms the basis of a new range of saloons and estates which are set to go into production early next year.
- 8 March – The notable composer Sir William Walton dies aged 80 at La Mortella, his home on the Italian island of Ischia.
- 15 March – The Budget raises tax allowances, and cuts taxes by £2 billion.
- 24 March – The Darlington by-election caused by the death of sitting Labour MP Edward Fletcher on 13 February is held; Oswald O'Brien holds the seat for Labour.
- 26 March – Liverpool win the Football League Cup for the third year in succession, beating Manchester United 2–1 in the final at Wembley Stadium. The Reds, whose manager Bob Paisley will retire at the end of the current football season, are also on course to win the Football League First Division title for a record 14th time.
- 28 March – Ian MacGregor appointed as chairman of the National Coal Board, taking office on 1 September.

=== April ===
- April – Vauxhall launches the Nova supermini with a range of three-door hatchbacks and two-door saloons. It is the first Vauxhall to be built outside the United Kingdom, being assembled at the Zaragoza plant in Spain where it was launched seven months ago as the Opel Corsa, but plans to launch it on the British market had been attacked by trade unions who were angry at the fact that it would not be built in Britain. Its launch is expected to result in the end of Vauxhall Chevette production in Britain.
- 1 April
  - Thousands of protesters form a 14-mile human chain in reaction to the siting of American nuclear weapons in British military bases.
  - The government expels three Russians named as KGB agents by a Soviet defector.
- 4 April – The biggest cash haul in British history sees gunmen escape with £7 million from a Security Express van in East London.
- 11 April – Richard Attenborough's 1982 film Gandhi wins eight Academy Awards.
- 21 April – The one pound coin introduced in England and Wales.

=== May ===
- 9 May – Margaret Thatcher calls a general election for 9 June. Opinion polls show her on course for victory with the Tories 8–12 points ahead of Labour, and they are widely expected to form a significant overall majority due to the split in left-wing votes caused by the Alliance, who are now aiming to take Labour's place in opposition.
- 11 May - Aberdeen F.C. beat Real Madrid 2–1 (after extra time) to win the European Cup Winner's Cup. They are currently (as of 2023) the last team to beat Real Madrid in a European Final.
- 14 May – Dundee United F.C. are crowned Scottish football champions for the first time in their history by winning the Scottish Premier Division, on the final day of the league season at the home of their city rivals Dundee F.C., Dens Park.
- 16 May – Wheel clamps are first used to combat illegal parking in London.
- 21 May – Manchester United and Brighton & Hove Albion draw 2–2 in the FA Cup final at Wembley Stadium. The replay will be held in five days time.
- 26 May
  - Manchester United defeat Brighton & Hove Albion 4–0 in the FA Cup final replay at Wembley Stadium. Bryan Robson scores two of the goals, with the other two coming from Arnold Muhren and 18-year-old Norman Whiteside.
  - Opinion polls suggest that the Conservatives are looking set to be re-elected with a landslide. A MORI poll puts them on 51%, 22 points ahead of Labour.

=== June ===
- 1 June
  - Jockey Lester Piggott rides Teenoso to victory at the Epsom Derby, Piggott's ninth win in the race.
  - Showjumper Caroline Bradley collapses from a heart attack after completing the first round of the Suffolk show, and dies later, aged 37.
- 6 June – The thirteenth James Bond film – Octopussy – is released in UK cinemas. It is the sixth of seven films to star Roger Moore as James Bond.
- 9 June – 1983 UK general election: Margaret Thatcher, Conservative Prime Minister of the United Kingdom since 1979, wins a landslide victory with a majority of 144 seats (through just 42% of the popular vote) over Michael Foot, who led a highly divided and weakened Labour Party which earned only 28% of the vote. Among the new members of parliament are three Labour MP's who will be future party leaders, Tony Blair for Sedgefield in County Durham, Gordon Brown for Dunfermline East in Scotland and Jeremy Corbyn for Islington North in London. The election is also a disappointment for the SDP–Liberal Alliance, who come close behind Labour in votes but are left with a mere 23 MPs in the new parliament compared to Labour's 209. The new 650-seat parliament will have 397 Conservative MP's, whereas Labour now has just 209. The election also sees the retirement of former prime minister Harold Wilson after 38 years as a Labour MP.
- 10 June – Computer tycoon Clive Sinclair is knighted.
- 12 June – Michael Foot resigns as leader of the Labour Party. Neil Kinnock, shadow spokesman for education and MP for Islwyn in South Wales, is tipped to succeed him; however, the successor will not be confirmed until this autumn.
- 14 June – Roy Jenkins resigns as leader of the Social Democratic Party and is succeeded by David Owen. Although the SDP gained 25% (around 7 million) of the votes and fell just short of Labour in terms of votes, they attained only a fraction of the number of seats won by Labour.
- 15 June – The first episode of the historical sitcom Blackadder, is broadcast on BBC One.
- 16 June – National Museum of Photography, Film and Television opens in Bradford.

=== July ===
- 7 July – New chancellor Nigel Lawson announces public spending cuts of £500 million.
- 13 July
  - Neil Kinnock escapes uninjured when his Ford Sierra overturns on the M4 motorway in Berkshire.
  - MP's vote 361–245 against the reinstatement of the death penalty, 18 years after its abolition.
- 15 July – Much of the country embraces a heatwave as temperatures reach 33 °C in London.
- 16 July – Twenty people are killed in the 1983 British Airways Sikorsky S-61 crash in the Celtic Sea.
- 19 July – A large new model of a flesh-eating dinosaur is erected at the Natural History Museum.
- 21 July – Former prime minister Harold Wilson is one of 17 life peerages announced today, having stood down from parliament last month after 38 years as MP for Huyton, near Liverpool.
- 22 July – Production of the Ford Orion four-door saloon begins. The Orion is the saloon version of the Escort, but is also aimed at buyers of larger family saloon cars like the recently discontinued Cortina. It goes on sale this Autumn and is produced at the Halewood plant in Liverpool as well as the Valencia plant in Spain which also produces the smaller Fiesta.
- 26 July – A Catholic mother of ten, Victoria Gillick, loses a case in the High Court of Justice against the DHSS. Her application sought to prevent the distribution of contraceptives to children under the age of 16 without parental consent. The case goes to the House of Lords in 1985 when it is decided that it is legal for doctors to prescribe contraceptives to under-16s without parental consent in exceptional circumstances ("Gillick competence").
- 28 July – The Penrith and the Border by-election, caused by the elevation of Conservative MP William Whitelaw to the peerage, is held; David Maclean holds the seat for the Conservatives.
- 29 July – Actor and novelist David Niven dies aged 73 at his home in Château d'Œx, Switzerland.
- 1 to 31 July – The two hundredth anniversary of the previous hottest month in the CET series sees a new record for heat with a monthly mean CET of 19.4 °C or 66.9 °F – 0.6 °C or 1.1 °F hotter than July 1783.

=== August ===
- 1 August – The new A-prefix car registration plates are launched, helping spur on the recovery in car sales following the slump at the start of the decade caused by the recession.
- 5 August – 22 Provisional Irish Republican Army (IRA) members receive sentences totalling over 4,000 years from a Belfast Court.
- 18 August – Architectural historian Sir Nikolaus Pevsner dies aged 81 at his home in Hampstead, London.
- 19 August – Temperatures reach 30 °C in London, as hot weather embraces the United Kingdom.
- 29 August – ITV launches Blockbusters, a gameshow hosted by Bob Holness and featuring sixth formers as its contestants.

=== September ===
- 8 September – The National Health Service privatises cleaning, catering and laundering services in a move which Social Services Secretary Norman Fowler predicts will save between £90 million and £180 million a year.
- 11 September – The SDP Conference voted against a merger with the Liberals until at least 1988.
- 19 September – The West Indian island nation of Saint Kitts and Nevis becomes independent of the United Kingdom.
- 21 September – The England national football team lose 1–0 to Denmark at Wembley Stadium in the penultimate qualifying game for Euro 84, making qualification unlikely.
- 22 September – Docklands redevelopment in East London begins with the opening of an Enterprise Zone on the Isle of Dogs.
- 25 September – Maze Prison escape: 38 IRA prisoners armed with six guns hijack a lorry and escape from HM Prison Maze in County Antrim, Northern Ireland; one guard dies of a heart attack and 20 others are injured in the attempt to foil the escape, the largest prison escape since World War II and in British history. 19 escapees are later apprehended.
- 30 September – In the latest crackdown on football hooliganism, seven men (all members of the notorious Subway Army, a football firm associated with Wolverhampton Wanderers F.C.) are convicted of taking part in a fight near the club's stadium.
- September – Ford launches two new models, the second generation Fiesta supermini and the Orion, the saloon version of the big-selling Escort.

=== October ===
- 2 October – Neil Kinnock is elected leader of the Labour Party following the retirement of Michael Foot. Kinnock attracts more than 70% of the votes, and names Roy Hattersley (who came second with nearly 20%) as his deputy.
- 4 October – Richard Noble, driving the British turbojet-powered car Thrust2, takes the land speed record to 634.051 mph (1020.406 km/h) over 1 km (633.47 mph (1019.47 km/h) over 1 mile) at Black Rock Desert in the United States, an increase of 40 mph over the previous kilometre record.
- 7 October – A plan to abolish the Greater London Council is announced.
- 14 October – Cecil Parkinson resigns as Trade and Industry Secretary following revelations about his extramarital relationship with his secretary Sara Keays.
- 19 October – Shooting of Stephen Waldorf: The two Metropolitan policemen who mistakenly shot and wounded Stephen Waldorf in January are cleared of attempted murder.
- 22 October – Between 200,000 and a million people demonstrate against nuclear weapons at a Campaign for Nuclear Disarmament march in London.
- 24 October
  - Arthur Hutchinson kills three members of the Laitner family and rapes their daughter in the Sheffield suburb of Dore.
  - Dennis Nilsen goes on trial at the Central Criminal Court accused of six murders and two attempted murders. He confesses to murdering "15 or 16" men.
- 25 October
  - American forces invade the Commonwealth country of Grenada.
  - Roy Griffiths presents his report on general management of the National Health Service.
- 27 October – A memorial service is held for David Niven at St Martin-in-the-Fields, London.

=== November ===
- 4 November – Dennis Nilsen is sentenced to life imprisonment.
- 5 November – Five workers on the Byford Dolphin semi-submersible oil rig are killed in an explosive decompression while drilling in the Frigg gas field in the Norwegian sector of the North Sea.
- 13 November
  - The first United States cruise missiles arrive at RAF Greenham Common in Berkshire amid protests from peace campaigners at the Greenham Common Women's Peace Camp.
  - Gerry Adams takes office as elected leader of Sinn Féin.
- 15 November – Actor John Le Mesurier dies aged 71 at Ramsgate, Kent.
- 16 November – England beat Luxembourg 4–0 in their final Euro 84 qualifying game but still fail to qualify for next summer's tournament in France as Denmark also win their final qualifying game. After the game, more than 20 England fans are arrested after going on a violent rampage in Luxembourg.
- 18 November – Walton sextuplets: 31-year-old Liverpool woman Janet Walton gives birth to female sextuplets following fertility treatment, the world's first all-female surviving sextuplets.
- 23 November – The 23-mile M54 motorway opens, giving the M6 north of Wolverhampton a link with the new town of Telford in Shropshire.
- 24 November – Fifteen-year-old Lynda Mann is found raped and strangled in the village of Narborough, Leicestershire, for which Colin Pitchfork will eventually be convicted.
- 26 November – Brink's-Mat robbery: In London, 6,800 gold bars worth nearly £26 million are taken from the Brink's-Mat vault at Heathrow Airport. Only a fraction of the gold is ever recovered, and only two men are convicted of the crime.

=== December ===
- 4 December – An SAS undercover operation ends in the shooting and killing of two IRA gunmen, a third is injured.
- 6 December – First heart and lung transplant carried out in Britain at Harefield Hospital.
- 8 December – The House of Lords votes to allow television broadcast of its proceedings.
- 9 December – A woman is killed in the Wrawby Junction rail crash.
- 10 December – William Golding wins the Nobel Prize in Literature "for his novels which, with the perspicuity of realistic narrative art and the diversity and universality of myth, illuminate the human condition in the world of today".
- 15 December – The second of two James Bond films not produced by Eon Productions – Never Say Never Again – is released in UK cinemas. An adaptation of the novel Thunderball (which had previously been adapted by Eon in the 1965 film of the same name), it marks Sean Connery's return as James Bond for his seventh and final overall outing.
- 17 December – Six people are killed in the Harrods bombing.
- 25 December (Christmas Day) – A second IRA bomb explodes in Oxford Street, but this time nobody is injured.

=== Undated ===
- Designer and entrepreneur James Dyson produces his prototype vacuum cleaner.
- Hanson Trust takes over United Drapery Stores (UDS) to realise the assets of its high street shops.
- Thames Water shuts down the reciprocating stationary steam engines at its Waddon pumping station in Croydon, the last in Britain to pump drinking water by steam.
- Despite unemployment remaining in excess of 3 million, the battle against inflation which has largely contributed to mass unemployment is being won as inflation falls to 4.6% – the lowest level since 1966.
- The economic recovery continues with 4.7% overall growth for the year, the highest since 1973. The year also sees unbroken growth for the first time since 1978.
- Japanese carmaker Nissan, which plans to open a factory in Britain by 1986, drops the Datsun marque on British registered cars after nearly two decades and adopts the Nissan brand in its place.

== Publications ==
- Barbara Cartland writes 23 romantic novels.
- Andrew Hodges' biography Alan Turing: The Enigma.
- Howard Jacobson's first novel Coming from Behind.
- Terry Pratchett's first Discworld novel The Colour of Magic.
- Salman Rushdie's novel Shame.
- Graham Swift's novel Waterland.
- Saga Magazine begins publication; it will become Britain's biggest selling subscription monthly.

== Births ==
- 1 January – Calum Davenport, footballer
- 17 January – Christopher Stalford, Northern Irish politician (died 2022)
- 21 January – Wes Streeting, politician
- 24 January – Shaun Maloney, Scottish football player and manager
- 27 January – Douglas Ross, Scottish politician
- 31 January – James Sutton, actor
- 16 February – Agyness Deyn, model and actress
- 18 February
  - Louise Glover, model and photographer
  - Jermaine Jenas, television presenter and footballer
- 22 February – Dominic Lyne, author
- 23 February – Emily Blunt, actress
- 24 February – Sophie Howard, glamour model
- 26 February – Andrew Baggaley, English table tennis player
- 27 February – Hayley Angel Holt, actress
- 28 February – Terry Bywater, basketball player
- 4 March – Adam Deacon, actor
- 9 March – Bryony Afferson, actress and musician
- 12 March – Roxy Shahidi, actress
- 14 March
  - Joe Flynn, actor
  - Anas Sarwar, politician
- 15 March – Sean Biggerstaff, actor
- 21 March – Bruno Langley, actor
- 28 March – Ryan Ashington, footballer
- 29 March – Ed Skrein, actor and rapper
- 31 March – Meinir Gwilym, Welsh folk singer
- 6 April – James Wade, darts player
- 13 April – Marvin Morgan, footballer (died 2021)
- 14 April – Simon Burnett, swimmer
- 5 May – Henry Cavill, actor
- 6 May – Magdalen Berns, YouTuber, boxer and software developer (d. 2019)
- 8 May – Matt Willis, singer-songwriter
- 13 May – Natalie Cassidy, actress
- 18 May
  - Lyndon Ogbourne, actor
  - Gary O'Neil, football player and manager
- 19 May – Jessica Fox, actress
- 20 May – Emma Williams, actress
- 22 May – Connie and Cassie Powney, twin actresses
- 26 May – Henry Holland, fashion designer
- 28 May – Toby Hemingway, British/American actor
- 30 May – Jennifer Ellison, actress
- 31 May – Reggie Yates, actor, television presenter, and radio DJ
- 2 June – Lisa Hammond, actress
- 6 June – Gemma Bissix, actress
- 8 June – Allan Dick, Scottish field hockey goalkeeper
- 17 June
  - Connie Fisher, actress and singer
  - Lee Ryan, singer
- 19 June
  - Laura Norton, actress
  - Mark Selby, snooker player
- 22 June – Sally Nicholls, children's author
- 24 June – Christian Day, English rugby union player
- 25 June – Todd Cooper, swimmer
- 30 June – Cheryl Cole, singer
- 6 July – David Price, boxer
- 19 July – Helen Skelton, TV presenter
- 20 July – Rory Jennings, actor
- 22 July – Jodi Albert, actress and singer
- 5 August - Kara Tointon, actress
- 6 August – Neil Harvey, English-Barbadian footballer
- 7 August - Tina O'Brien, actress
- 9 August – David Ames, actor
- 11 August – Sammy Glenn, actress
- 18 August – Kris Boyd, football player and pundit
- 21 August – Chantelle Houghton, reality TV star
- 22 August – Julie Kilpatrick, Scottish field hockey player
- 23 August – Fiona Onasanya, Labour Member of Parliament and criminal convicted of perverting the course of justice
- 24 August – Christopher Parker, actor
- 1 September - Mohammed Marban, Model
- 4 September – Jennifer Metcalfe, actress
- 13 September – James Bourne, singer-songwriter
- 14 September – Amy Winehouse, singer-songwriter (died 2011)
- 17 September – Catherine Tyldesley, English actress and model
- 18 September – Naomi Folkard, archer
- 30 September – Louise Munn, Scottish field hockey defender
- 1 October – Tom Dillon, English rugby union player
- 14 October
  - David Oakes, film, television and theatre actor
  - Zesh Rehman, English-Pakistani footballer
- 17 October – Felicity Jones, actress
- 28 October – Joe Thomas, actor
- 10 November – Jo Ellis, English field hockey forward
- 15 November – Sophia Di Martino, actress
- 17 November – Harry Lloyd, actor
- 18 November – Robert Kazinsky, actor and model
- 24 November
  - Dean Ashton, footballer
  - Gwilym Lee, Welsh actor
- 28 November
  - Ellie Taylor, English comedian and television presenter
  - Kelly Wenham, English actress
- 6 December – Francesca Jackson, musical theatre actress
- 19 December – Bridget Phillipson, politician
- 20 December
  - Maggie Alphonsi, broadcaster and rugby union player
  - Lucy Pinder, model
- 26 December – Alex Phillips, television presenter and politician
- 31 December – Ebony Rainford-Brent, cricket player and commentator
- date unknown
  - Leila Benn Harris, actress and singer

== Deaths ==
=== January ===
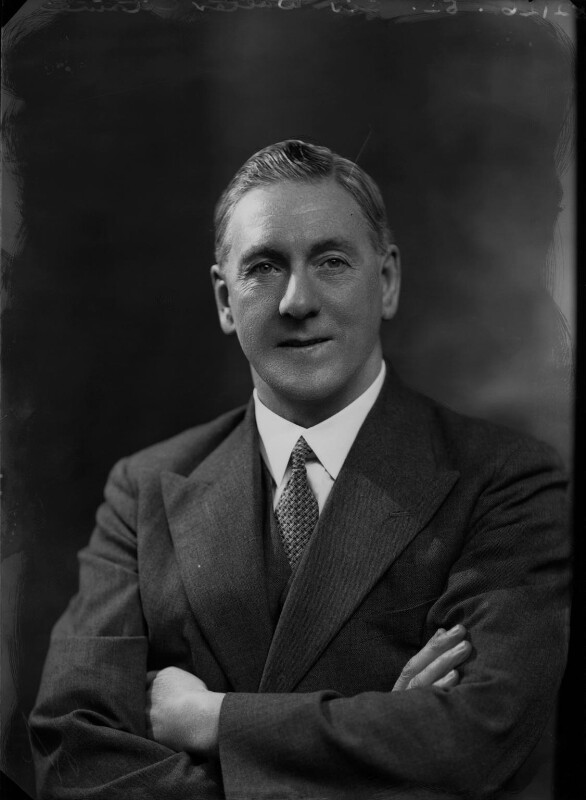
Walter Citrine, 1st Baron Citrine

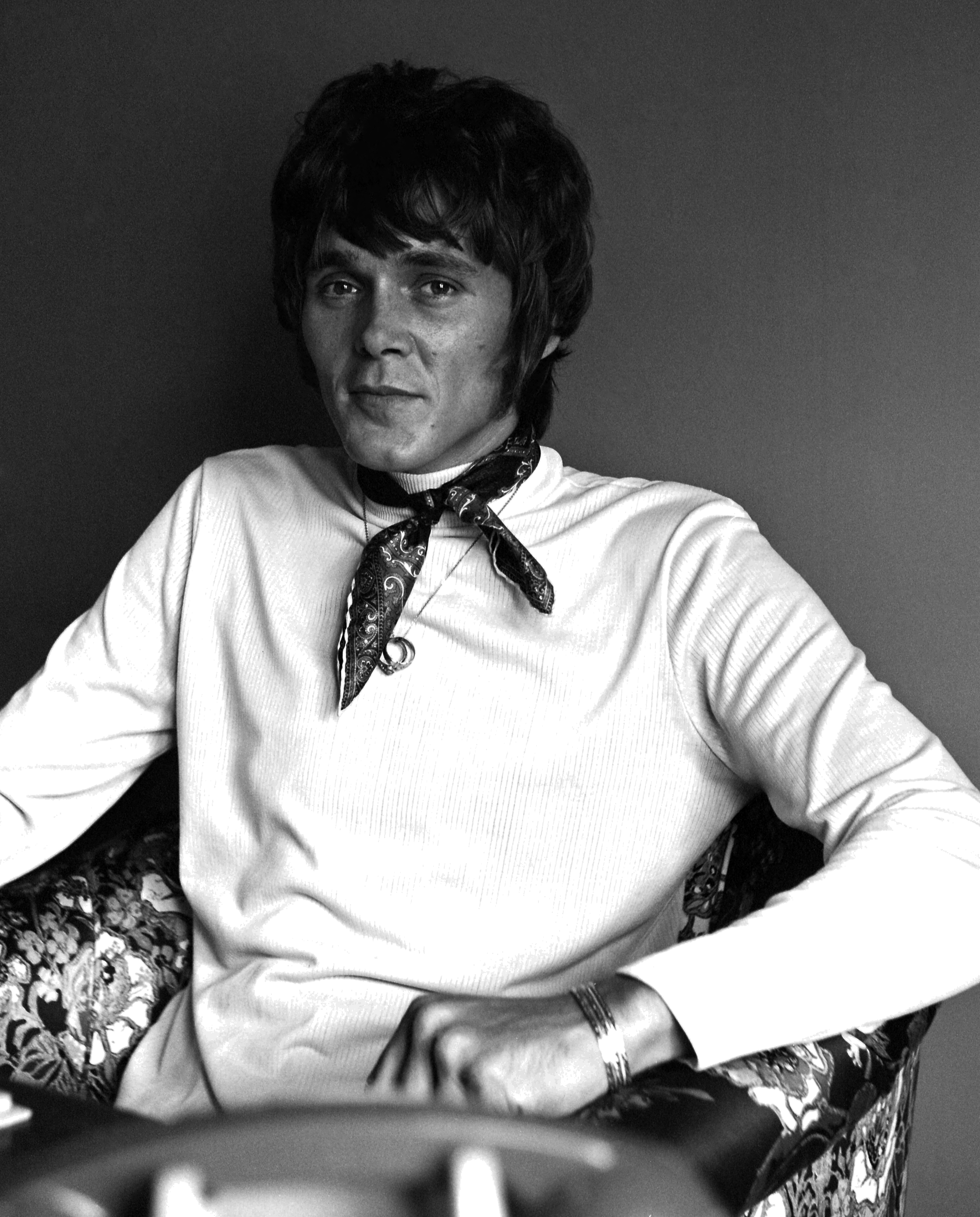
Billy Fury

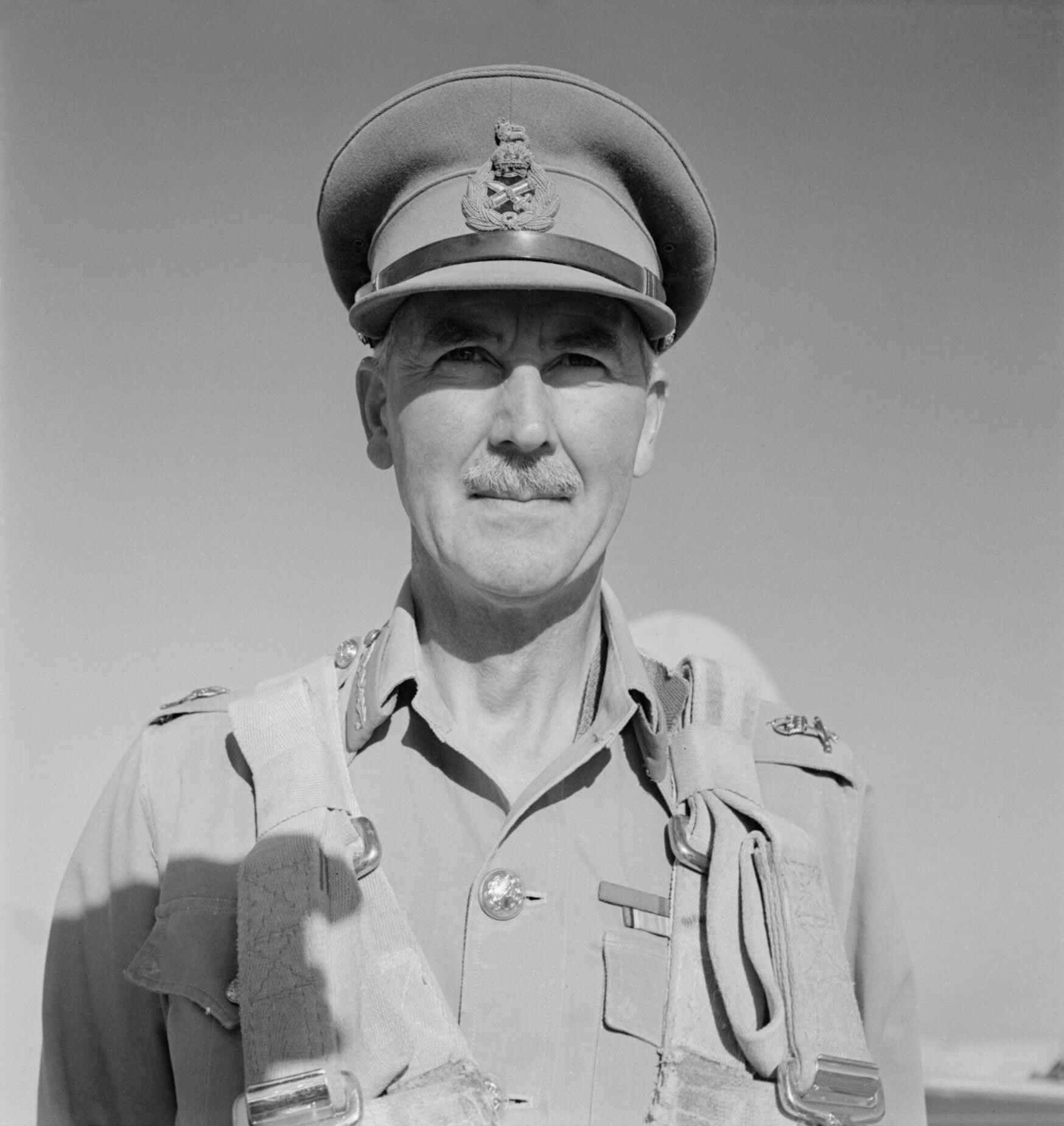
Alan Cunningham

- 2 January
  - Dick Emery, comedian and actor (born 1915)
  - Olive Mercer, actress (born 1905)
- 5 January
  - Amy Evans, opera singer (born 1884)
  - James Wentworth Day, writer and broadcaster (born 1899)
- 6 January
  - Sir John Laurie, 6th Baronet, Army major-general (born 1892)
  - Bernard Stevens, composer (born 1916)
- 7 January
  - Henry Bourke, Army brigadier (born 1900)
  - Edith Coates, opera singer (born 1908)
- 8 January
  - Alfred Baxter, weightlifter (born 1898)
  - Arthur Stanley-Clarke, Army brigadier-general and cricketer (born 1886)
- 9 January – Ernest Entwistle Cheesman, botanist (born 1898)
- 10 January
  - Carwyn James, Welsh rugby union player (born 1929)
  - Ewan Roberts, actor (born 1914)
- 13 January
  - Arthur Kirby, railway administrator (born 1899)
  - Frank Broadbent, architect (born 1909)
- 14 January – Margie Morris, film actress (born 1892)
- 17 January
  - John Dunn, Scottish-born American cartoon writer (born 1919)
  - John Rawlence, cricketer and Army colonel (born 1915)
- 18 January
  - Vernon Bartlett, journalist and politician (born 1894)
  - Cedric Thorpe Davie, composer and musician (born 1913)
  - Tristram Hillier, painter (born 1905)
  - John Lockwood, politician (born 1890)
  - Colin Watson, crime fiction writer (born 1920)
- 20 January – Basil Brooke, Royal Navy vice-admiral (born 1895)
- 22 January – Walter Citrine, 1st Baron Citrine, trade unionist (born 1887)
- 23 January
  - Fred Bakewell, English cricketer (born 1908)
  - Mary Katherine Herbert, World War II spy (born 1903)
- 24 January – Catherine Dean, artist (born 1905)
- 25 January – Betty Trask, novelist (born 1893)
- 28 January – Billy Fury, rock singer-songwriter (born 1940)
- 29 January – Francis Northey Richardson, Army lieutenant-colonel and brewer (born 1894)
- 30 January – Sir Alan Cunningham, Army general in World War II (born 1887)

=== February ===
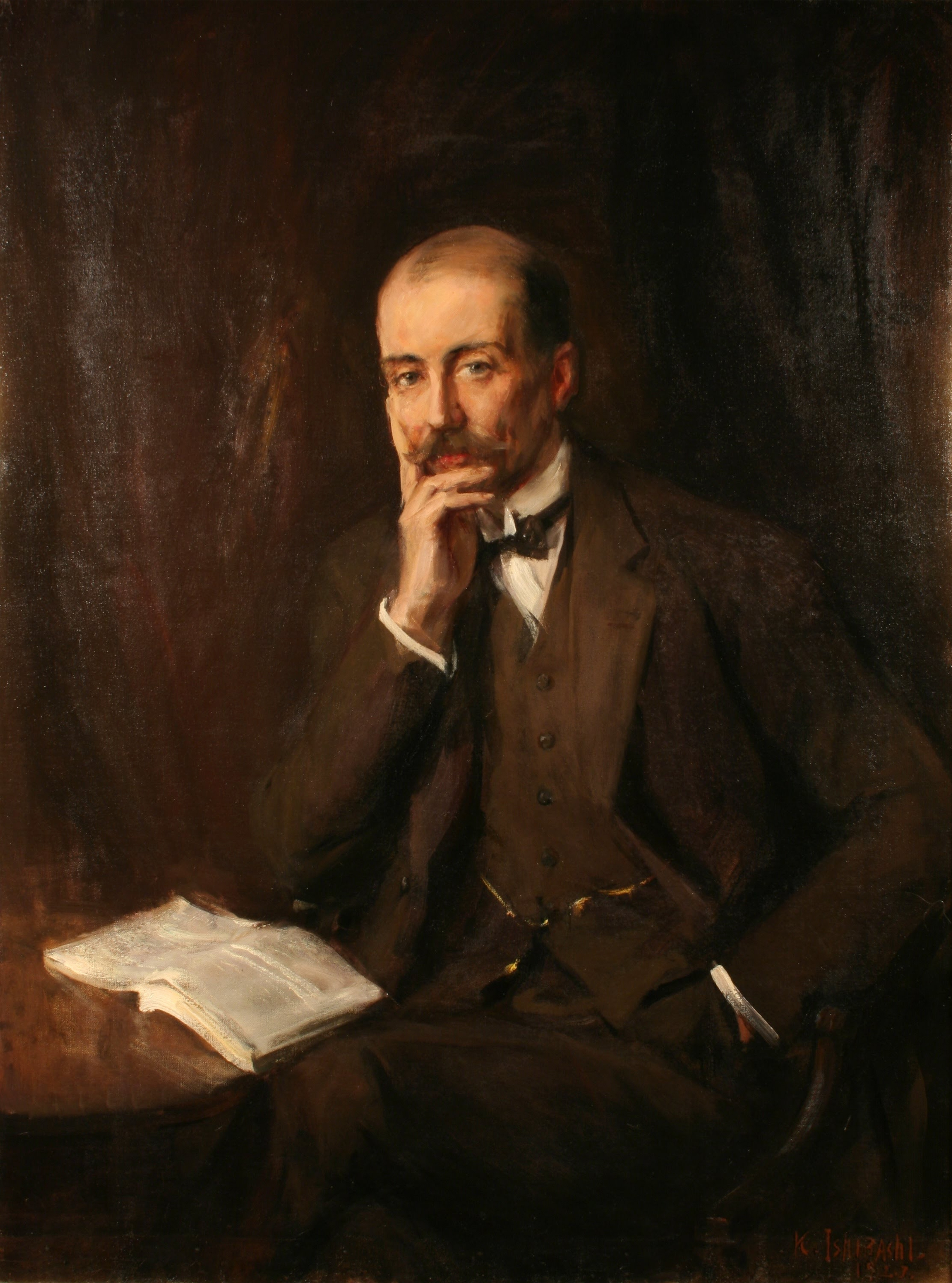
Adrian Boult

- 1 February – Howard Gaunt, schoolteacher and cricketer (born 1902)
- 3 February
  - Sir Charles William Hayward, businessman and philanthropist (born 1892)
  - John Hanbury Martin, politician (born 1890)
- 4 February
  - Reginald Denham, actor, film producer and director (born 1894)
  - Ron Johnson, cyclist (born 1907)
- 6 February – Cyril Lowe, rugby union player and World War I air ace (born 1891)
- 7 February – Thomas Nicol, anatomist (born 1900)
- 8 February
  - Harry Boot, physicist (born 1917)
  - Charlotte Francis, actress (born 1904)
  - Harry Mitchell, boxer (born 1898)
- 9 February – Sam Smith, toy maker (born 1908)
- 10 February – Michael Roberts, politician (born 1927)
- 11 February – Anne Anderson, physiologist and author (born 1937)
- 13 February – Edward Fletcher, Labour Member of Parliament (born 1911)
- 18 February
  - Howard Nixon, librarian (born 1909)
  - Robert Payne, author (born 1911)
- 19 February – George Rogers, politician (born 1906)
- 20 February – Peter Glaze, comedian (born 1917)
- 21 February – Jaqueline Tyrwhitt, town planner (born 1905)
- 22 February
  - Sir Adrian Boult, conductor (born 1889)
  - Sir Charles Gairdner, Army lieutenant-general (born 1898)
  - John Kidston Swire, businessman (born 1893)
- 23 February
  - Arthur Gore, 8th Earl of Arran, peer and politician (born 1910)
  - Herbert Howells, composer (born 1892)
- 24 February – Herbert Hannam, police officer (born 1908)
- 25 February – Lancelot Joynson-Hicks, 3rd Viscount Brentford, peer and politician (born 1902)
- 26 February – Ken Brooke, magician (born 1920)
- 27 February
  - Ruth Dunning, actress (born 1909)
  - Tom Williamson, Baron Williamson, politician (born 1897)
- 28 February
  - Winifred Atwell, pianist (born c. 1914, Trinidad)
  - Arthur Erskine Ellis, biologist and naturalist (born 1902)

=== March ===
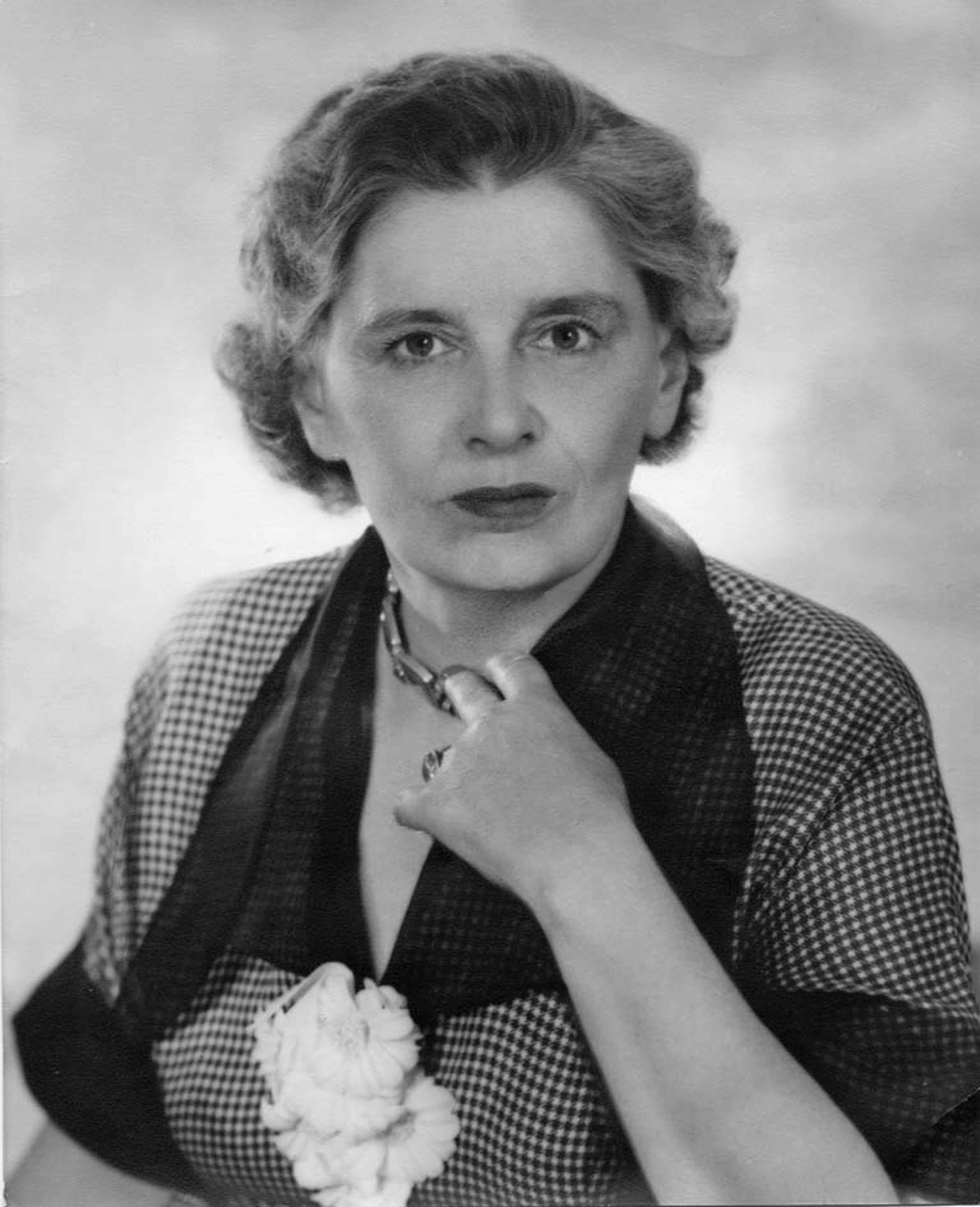
Rebecca West

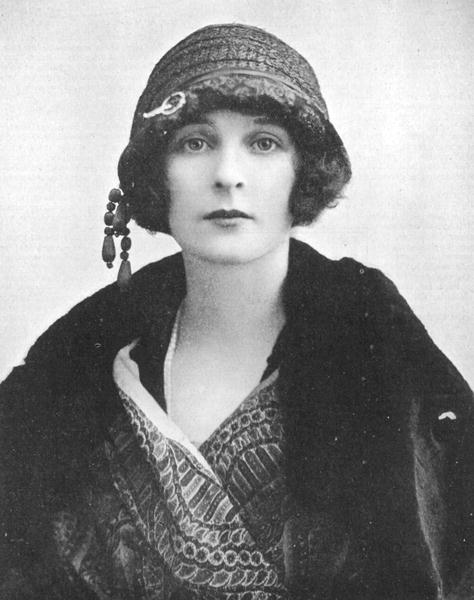
Freda Dudley Ward

- 2 March
  - Donald Butterworth, Army major-general (born 1895)
  - George Roger Clemo, chemist (born 1889)
- 5 March
  - Rex Jameson, comedian (born 1924)
  - Joseph McGee, Roman Catholic bishop (born 1904)
- 6 March
  - Donald Maclean, diplomat and spy (born 1913)
  - Howard McFarlane, jazz trumpeter (born 1894)
- 8 March
  - Alan Lennox-Boyd, 1st Viscount Boyd of Merton, peer and politician (born 1904)
  - Sir William Walton, composer (born 1902)
- 12 March – Michael Noble, politician (born 1935)
- 13 March – Zoe Palmer, actress (born 1903)
- 15 March – Dame Rebecca West, writer (born 1892)
- 16 March
  - Freda Dudley Ward, socialite (born 1894)
  - Sir Noel Thomas, Army general (born 1915)
- 20 March
  - Alec Jones, politician (born 1924)
  - Barnet Woolf, scientist (born 1902)
- 21 March
  - Thomas Ashton, 2nd Baron Ashton of Hyde, peer (born 1901)
  - Roy Chapman, English footballer (born 1934)
  - Dennis Fry, linguist (born 1907)
- 22 March
  - John Pratt, 5th Marquess Camden, peer (born 1899)
  - Ken Hudson, World War II airman (born 1915)
- 23 March
  - Eddie Milne, politician (born 1915)
  - David Wynne, composer (born 1900)
- 25 March – Francis Long, RAF vice-marshal (born 1899)
- 26 March
  - Anthony Blunt, art historian and Soviet spy (born 1907)
  - Rowena Cade, creator of the Minack Theatre (born 1893)
- 27 March – James Hayter, actor (born 1907)
- 29 March
  - Lena Alexander, artist (born 1899)
  - Antony Head, 1st Viscount Head, soldier and politician (born 1906)
  - James Heathcote-Drummond-Willoughby, 3rd Earl of Ancaster, peer and politician (born 1907)
  - Sir Noel Frederick Hall, economist and academic (born 1902)
  - Sir Maurice Kendall, statistician (born 1907)
  - Charles Oliver, film actor (born 1907)
- 30 March
  - James Crowther, scientific journalist (born 1899)
  - Tony Sympson, actor (born 1906)
- 31 March
  - Gerard Fairlie, Army colonel and author (born 1899)
  - Stephen Murray, actor (born 1912)
  - Howard Hayes Scullard, historian (born 1903)
  - Sir James Beveridge Thomson, lawyer (born 1902)

=== April ===
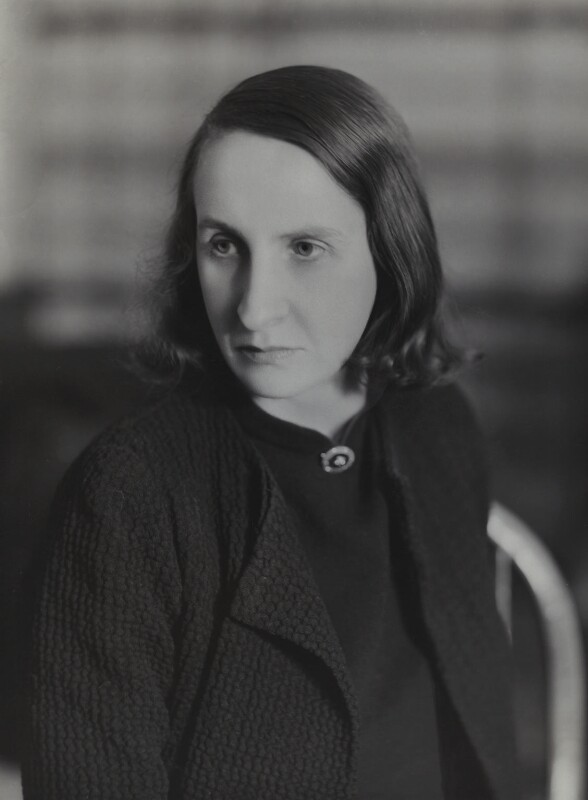
Elisabeth Lutyens

- 1 April – John R. Buckmaster, actor (suicide) (born 1915)
- 3 April
  - Jimmy Bloomfield, footballer and manager (born 1934)
  - George Hector Percival, dermatologist (born 1902)
- 5 April
  - Ron Bendall, businessman and director of Aston Villa (1975–1982) (born 1909)
  - Percy Wentworth Hope-Johnstone, Army officer (born 1909)
  - Anne McAllister, speech therapist (born 1892)
- 8 April – Sir Harold Mitchell, 1st Baronet, businessman and politician (born 1900)
- 10 April – James Langley, Army lieutenant-colonel (born 1916)
- 11 April – Eric Walker, World War I air ace (born 1896)
- 12 April
  - Desmond Bagley, journalist and novelist (born 1923)
  - Kenneth Callow, biochemist (born 1901)
  - Sir Harold Evans, 1st Baronet, civil servant (born 1911)
- 13 April
  - Gerry Hitchens, footballer (born 1934)
  - Christmas Humphreys, judge (born 1901)
  - Theodore Stephanides, physician and author (born 1896, British India)
- 14 April
  - Pete Farndon, bassist (The Pretenders) (accident) (born 1952)
  - Elisabeth Lutyens, composer (born 1906)
- 16 April
  - Herbert Jolly, golfer (born 1895)
  - Gladys Morgan, comedian (born 1898)
- 17 April
  - Philip Dee, nuclear physicist (born 1904)
  - Thomas L. Thomas, singer (born 1911)
- 19 April – Robert MacIntyre Gordon, World War I air ace and physician (born 1899)
- 20 April
  - Olive Deer, politician (born 1897)
  - Archie Macdonald, politician (born 1904)
  - Sarah Makem, Northern Irish singer (born 1900)
- 20 April
  - Eric Longley-Cook, Royal Navy vice-admiral (born 1898)
  - Sir Eric Gardner Turner, classicist (born 1911)
- 21 April – Georgiana Maxwell, 26th Baroness de Ros, peeress (born 1933)
- 22 April
  - Sir Ronald Ian Campbell, diplomat (born 1890)
  - Sir Ralph Lilley Turner, philologist (born 1888)
  - John Talbot White, naturalist (born 1925)
- 26 April
  - William Harold Joseph Childs, physicist (born 1905)
  - Henry Crowe, RAF air ace (born 1897)
  - Sir John Smyth, 1st Baronet, Army officer, politician and VC recipient (born 1893)
- 27 April – Christina Larner, historian (born 1933)
- 28 April – Martin Redmayne, Baron Redmayne, politician (born 1910)

=== May ===
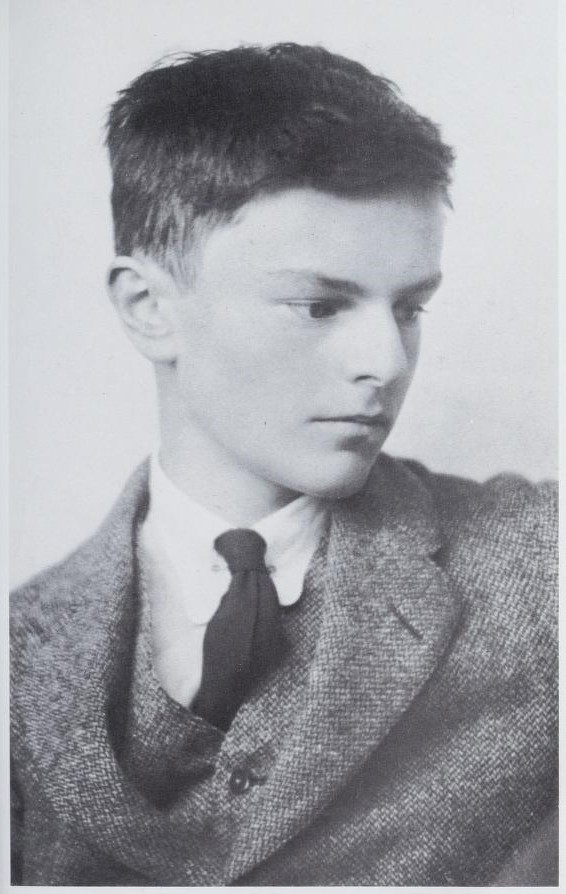
Kenneth Clark

- 1 May – Tom Harris, botanist (born 1903)
- 2 May – Charles Geddes, Baron Geddes of Epsom, trade unionist (born 1897)
- 3 May
  - John Aldridge, artist (born 1905)
  - Howard N. Cole, Army lieutenant-colonel (born 1911)
  - Gordon Stretton, singer, dancer and musical director (born 1887)
- 5 May – John Williams, actor (born 1903)
- 6 May – Pat Smythe, jazz pianist (born 1923)
- 7 May – Keith Stewartson, mathematician (born 1925)
- 8 May – Frank Hodgson, motorcyclist (born 1908)
- 9 May – Gertrude Hermes, wood engraver (born 1901)
- 10 May – Margaret K. Knight, psychologist (born 1903)
- 12 May – Kenneth Peppiatt, banker, Chief Cashier of the Bank of England (1934–1949)
- 15 May – Harry Lawson, legal scholar (born 1897)
- 17 May – Sir Gordon Willmer, judge (born 1899)
- 18 May – Sir Roger Fulford, journalist and historian (born 1902)
- 20 May – Violet Grantham, politician, first woman Lord Mayor of Newcastle upon Tyne (born 1893)
- 21 May
  - Kenneth Clark, Baron Clark, art historian (born 1903)
  - Joan du Plat Taylor, archaeologist (born 1906)
- 22 May
  - John Barrett, actor (born 1910)
  - John Penrose, actor (born 1914)
- 23 May – Eve Gray, actress (born 1900)
- 25 May – Sydney Box, film producer (born 1907)
- 26 May
  - Elsie Abbot, civil servant (born 1907)
  - Jack Hilton, novelist (born 1900)
- 28 May – Muriel Nichol, politician (born 1893)
- 31 May – Donald Britton, ballet dancer (born 1929)

=== June ===
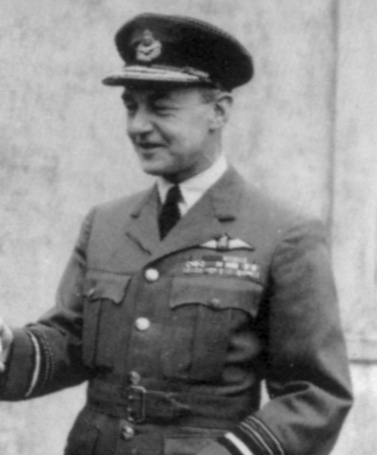
Thomas Pike

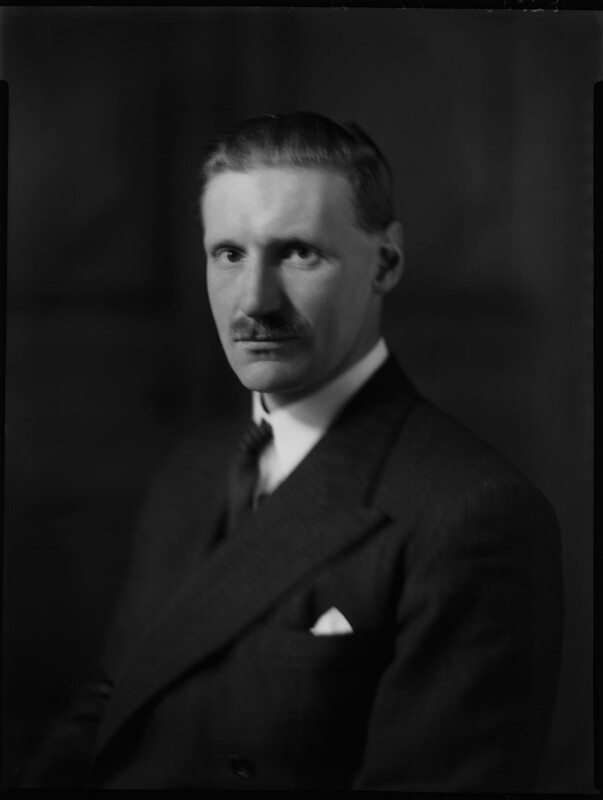
Henry Scrymgeour-Wedderburn, 11th Earl of Dundee

- 1 June
  - Caroline Bradley, showjumper (born 1946)
  - Sir Thomas Pike, Royal Air Force Commander (born 1906)
  - Percival Siebold, scouting administrator (born 1917)
- 2 June – Margaret Innes-Ker, Duchess of Roxburghe, peeress (born 1918)
- 3 June – Moses Blackman, crystallographer (born 1908, South Africa)
- 5 June – Sir Anthony Lewis, musicologist (born 1915)
- 6 June
  - Eric Abbott, Anglican priest (born 1906)
  - Sir Ambrose Coghill, actor (born 1902)
- 7 June – David Westbury, physician (born 1923)
- 9 June – John A. Mackay, theologian (born 1889)
- 10 June – Sir Paul Travers, Army lieutenant-general (born 1927)
- 12 June
  - Fred Pusey, film director (born 1909)
  - Ceinwen Rowlands, opera singer (born 1905)
- 17 June – George Benson, actor (born 1911)
- 18 June
  - Derek Godfrey, actor (born 1924)
  - Sir Reginald Portal, Royal Navy admiral (born 1894)
  - Robert Riddles, locomotive engineer (born 1892)
- 21 June – Angus Fulton, civil engineer (born 1900)
- 22 June
  - John Cazabon, actor (born 1914)
  - Daphne Heard, actress (born 1904)
  - Christopher Hinton, Baron Hinton of Bankside, nuclear engineer (born 1901)
  - David MacDonald, film director and producer (born 1904)
- 23 June – John Gavin Bone, cyclist (born 1914)
- 25 June – John Reeve, Army major-general (born 1891)
- 28 June – Dorothy Annan, painter, potter and muralist (born 1900)
- 29 June
  - William Romilly, 4th Baron Romilly, peer (born 1899)
  - Henry Scrymgeour-Wedderburn, 11th Earl of Dundee, Scottish peer and politician (born 1902)

=== July ===
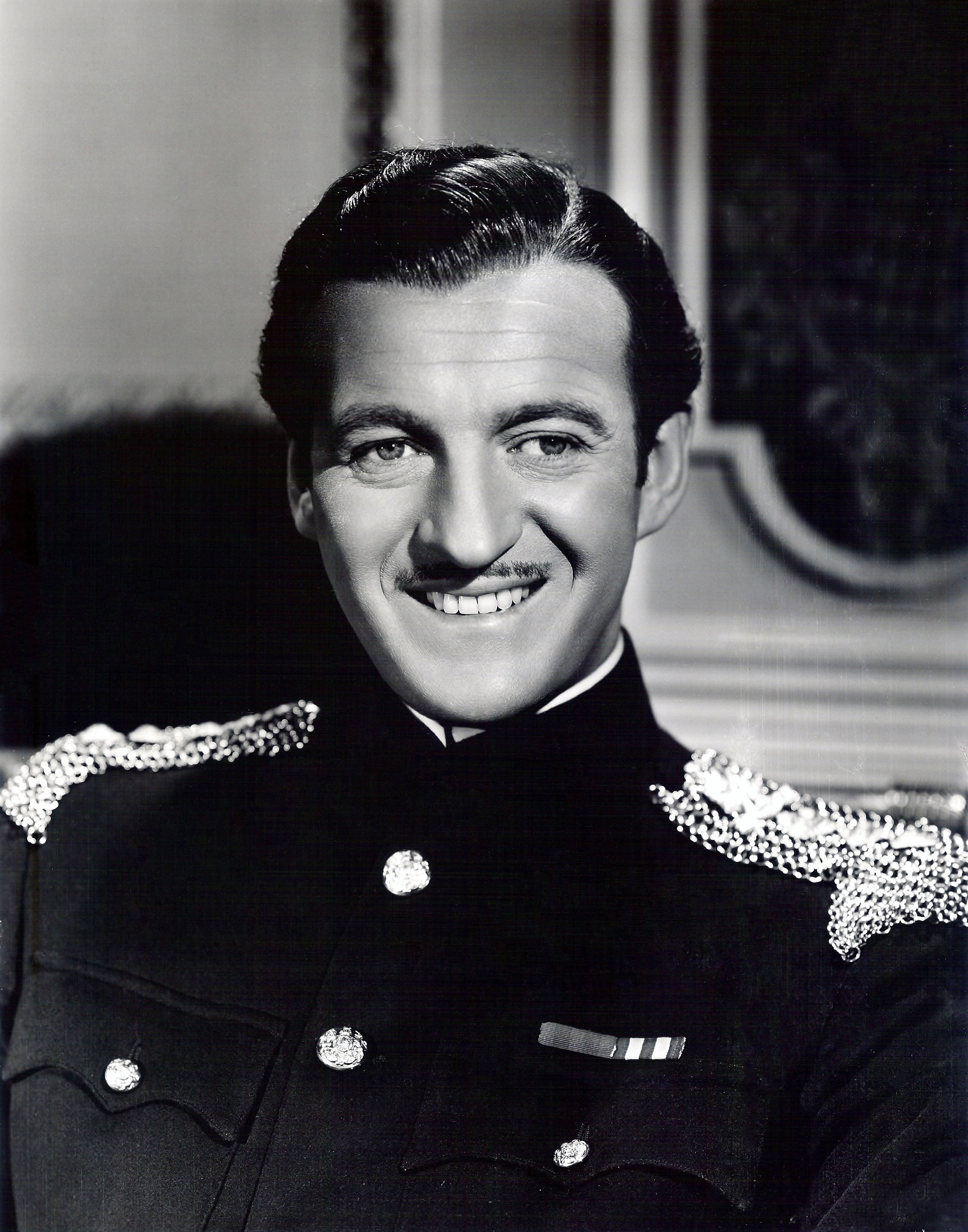
David Niven

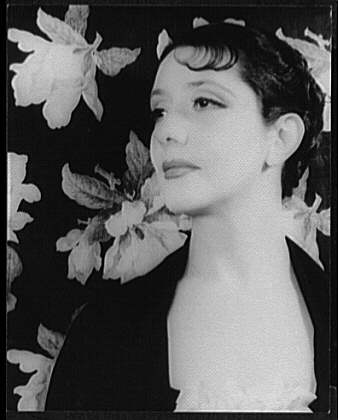
Lynn Fontanne

- 1 July – Gordon McIntyre, Lord Sorn, lawyer and judge (born 1896)
- 2 July – Jacqueline Townshend, pianist and violinist (born 1912)
- 3 July – Brian Jackson, educator (born 1932)
- 4 July
  - John Bodkin Adams, physician, suspected serial killer (born 1899)
  - David Lloyd George, 2nd Viscount Tenby, peer and grandson of David Lloyd George (born 1922)
- 6 July – Hugh Clegg, physician (born 1900)
- 9 July – Keith Wickenden, Conservative politician (born 1932)
- 11 July – Geoffrey Paul, Anglican prelate (born 1921)
- 12 July
  - Charles Lambert, Anglican priest (born 1894)
  - Chris Wood, rock musician (Traffic) (born 1944)
- 14 July
  - Franklin Adin Simmonds, surgeon (born 1910)
  - John Rous, 4th Earl of Stradbroke, peer (born 1903)
- 15 July – Leslie Hunter, second Bishop of Sheffield (born 1890)
- 16 July
  - Oliver Hart, cyclist (born 1912)
  - David Ward, opera singer (born 1922)
  - Sir Harold Whittingham, RAF air marshal (born 1887)
- 17 July – John Leonard, Baron Leonard, politician (born 1909)
- 18 July – Don Cockell, boxer (born 1928)
- 19 July
  - Cecil Reginald Burch, physicist and engineer (born 1901)
  - Bertram Maurice Hobby, entomologist (born 1905)
  - Kathleen Shaw, figure skater (born 1903)
- 20 July – Clement Clapton Chesterman, physician and author (born 1894)
- 21 July – Norman Chappell, actor (born 1925)
- 23 July – Karl Britton, philosopher (born 1909)
- 24 July – Sinclair Thomson, artist (born 1915)
- 27 July
  - Gladys Mitchell, novelist (born 1901)
  - William Staton, RAF air ace (born 1898)
- 29 July – David Niven, film actor (born 1910)
- 30 July – Lynn Fontanne, actress (born 1887)
- 31 July
  - John Addis, diplomat (born 1914)
  - Norman Brown, Northern Irish motorcyclist (killed while racing) (born 1959)

=== August ===
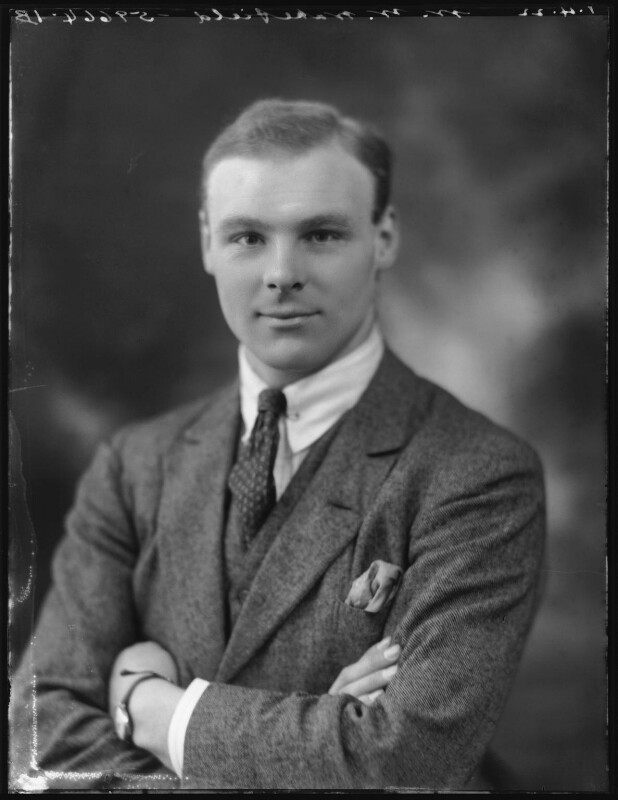
Wavell Wakefield, 1st Baron Wakefield of Kendal

- 1 August – Peter Arne, actor (born 1924)
- 3 August
  - Maeve Gilmore, artist (born 1917)
  - John Lymington, author (born 1911)
- 5 August – Joan Robinson, economist (born 1903)
- 7 August – Sir Geoffrey Follows, colonial administrator (born 1896)
- 11 August – George Wigg, Baron Wigg, politician (born 1900)
- 12 August – Wavell Wakefield, 1st Baron Wakefield of Kendal, politician and rugby union player (born 1898)
- 13 August – Sir Sidney Ford, trade union leader (born 1909)
- 14 August
  - Sir Robert Bray, Army general (born 1908)
  - Ian Nairn, architectural critic (born 1930)
- 16 August – May Baird, physician (born 1901)
- 18 August – Sir Nikolaus Pevsner, architectural historian (The Buildings of England) (born 1902, German Empire)
- 23 August – William Evans, trade unionist (born 1899)
- 26 August
  - Margaret Rock, World War II codebreaker (born 1903)
  - Laurie Sapper, trade unionist (born 1922)
  - Douglas Wimberley, Army major-general (born 1896)
- 29 August
  - Sir Kenneth Roberts-Wray, lawyer and civil servant (born 1899)
  - Winifred Rushforth, physician and missionary (born 1885)
- 30 August – Sir Dennis Proctor, civil servant (born 1905)
- 31 August
  - Marjorie Maitland Howard, sculptor and illustrator (born 1898)
  - Eve Taylor, music manager (born 1915)

=== September ===
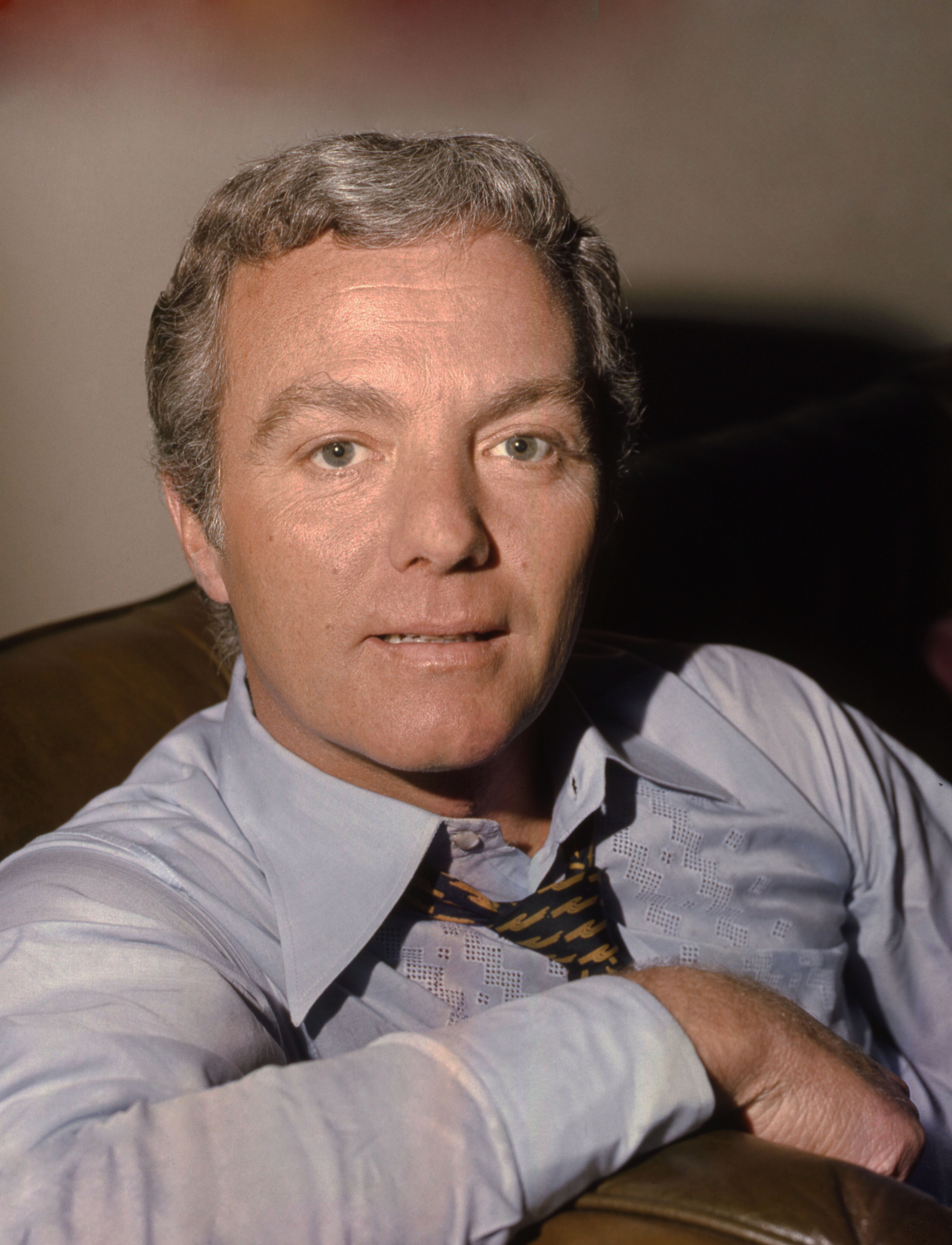
John Gilpin

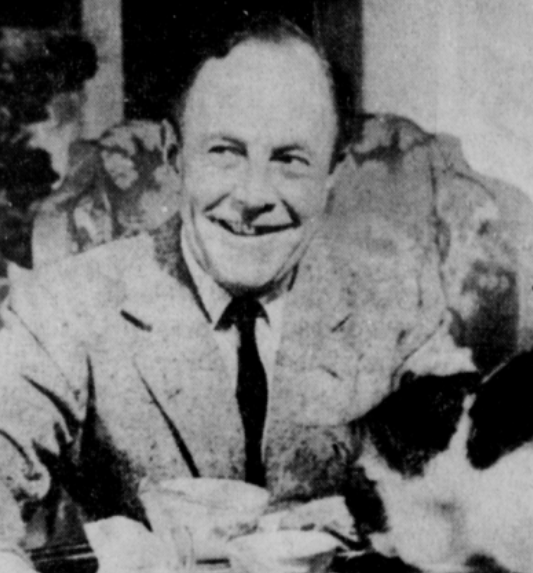
Beverley Nichols

- 1 September – Tasha Douty, waitress (murdered in Australia) (born 1943)
- 2 September – Jimmy Aubrey, actor (born 1887)
- 3 September – Leonard Burt, police officer (born 1892)
- 5 September
  - Geoffrey Bennett, Royal Navy commander and writer (born 1909)
  - John Gilpin, ballet dancer (born 1930)
- 6 September – David Gray, sports journalist (born 1927)
- 7 September – Sir Gilbert Nicholetts, RAF air marshal (born 1902)
- c. 8 September – Peter Sedgwick, writer and socialist activist (born 1934)
- 9 September – Dunstan Curtis, lawyer and politician (born 1910)
- 10 September – Norah Lofts, novelist (born 1904)
- 11 September
  - Ralph Murray, journalist and diplomat (born 1908)
  - Brian Lawrance, Australian-born bandleader (born 1909)
- 13 September – John Cobbold, businessman (born 1927)
- 14 September – Michael Scott, Anglican priest and anti-apartheid campaigner (born 1907)
- 15 September – Beverley Nichols, author (born 1898)
- 16 September – Burnaby Drayson, politician (born 1913)
- 17 September – Sir Denis Follows, sports administrator (born 1908)
- 19 September
  - Isabel Frances Grant, historian and ethnologist (born 1887)
  - Peter Mooney, orchestral conductor (born 1915)
  - Alexander Wilkinson, Army colonel and cricketer (born 1892, Australia)
- 20 September
  - Andy Beattie, Scottish footballer and manager (born 1913)
  - Sir Duncan Wilson, diplomat (born 1911)
- 23 September
  - Sir James Wilson Robertson, colonial administrator (born 1899)
  - Hugh White, RAF vice-marshal (born 1898)
- 24 September
  - Dame Isobel Baillie, opera singer (born 1895)
  - John Bee, organist (born 1895)
  - James Dow, physician (born 1911)
- 26 September – Eileen Betsy Tranmer, chess player (born 1910)
- 28 September – Michael Finn, economic historian (born 1917)
- 29 September
  - R. G. D. Allen, economist and statistician (born 1906)
  - Alan Moorehead, war journalist and historian (born 1910, Australia)
  - Sir Bruce White, consulting engineer (born 1885)

=== October ===
- 1 October
  - Marjorie Elizabeth Jane Chandler, palaeobotanist (born 1897)
  - Hermione Hannen, actress (born 1913)
- 2 October – Frances Horovitz, poet and broadcaster (born 1938)
- 6 October – Elizabeth Brunner, economist (born 1920)
- 7 October – Sir Charles Husband, civil engineer (born 1908)
- 11 October – Sir Anthony Mather-Jackson, colliery owner and cricketer (born 1899)
- 10 October – Ralph Richardson, actor (born 1902)
- 13 October – Joe Thompson, rugby league and rugby union player (born 1902)
- 14 October
  - Marjorie Gordon, actress and singer (born 1893)
  - Claud Scott, Anglican prelate (born 1901)
  - Michael C. Sedgwick, motoring writer (born 1926)
- 15 October – Christopher Eastwood, civil servant (born 1905)
- 17 October – Sir Dennis White, colonial administrator (born 1910)
- 18 October – Don Curtis, golfer (born 1904)
- 19 October – Dorothy Stuart Russell, pathologist (born 1895, Australia)
- 20 October
  - Peter Dudley, actor (born 1935)
  - Geoffrey Raynor, metallurgist (born 1913)
- 22 October
  - Laurence Bagley, artist (born 1922)
  - Sir Harold Bishop, broadcasting engineer (born 1900)
- 24 October – Andrew MacGregor, RAF air vice-marshal (born 1897)
- 27 October – Hedley Burrows, Anglican priest (born 1887)

=== November ===
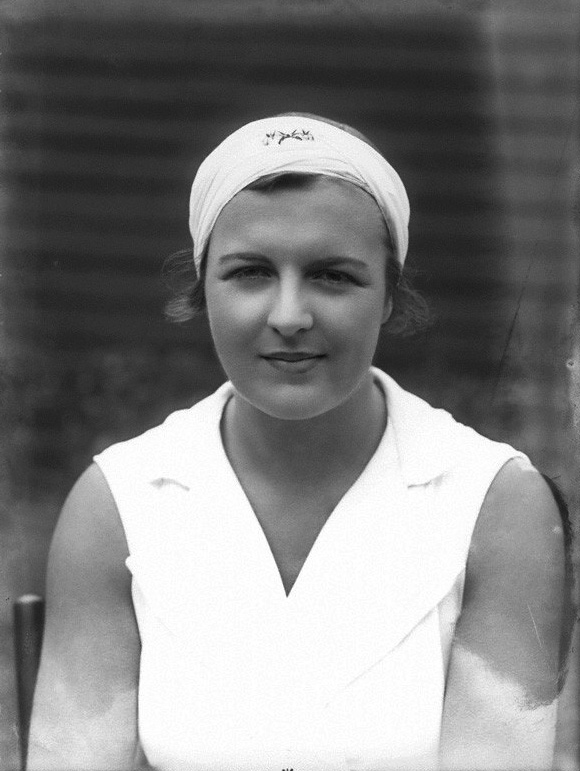
Betty Nuthall

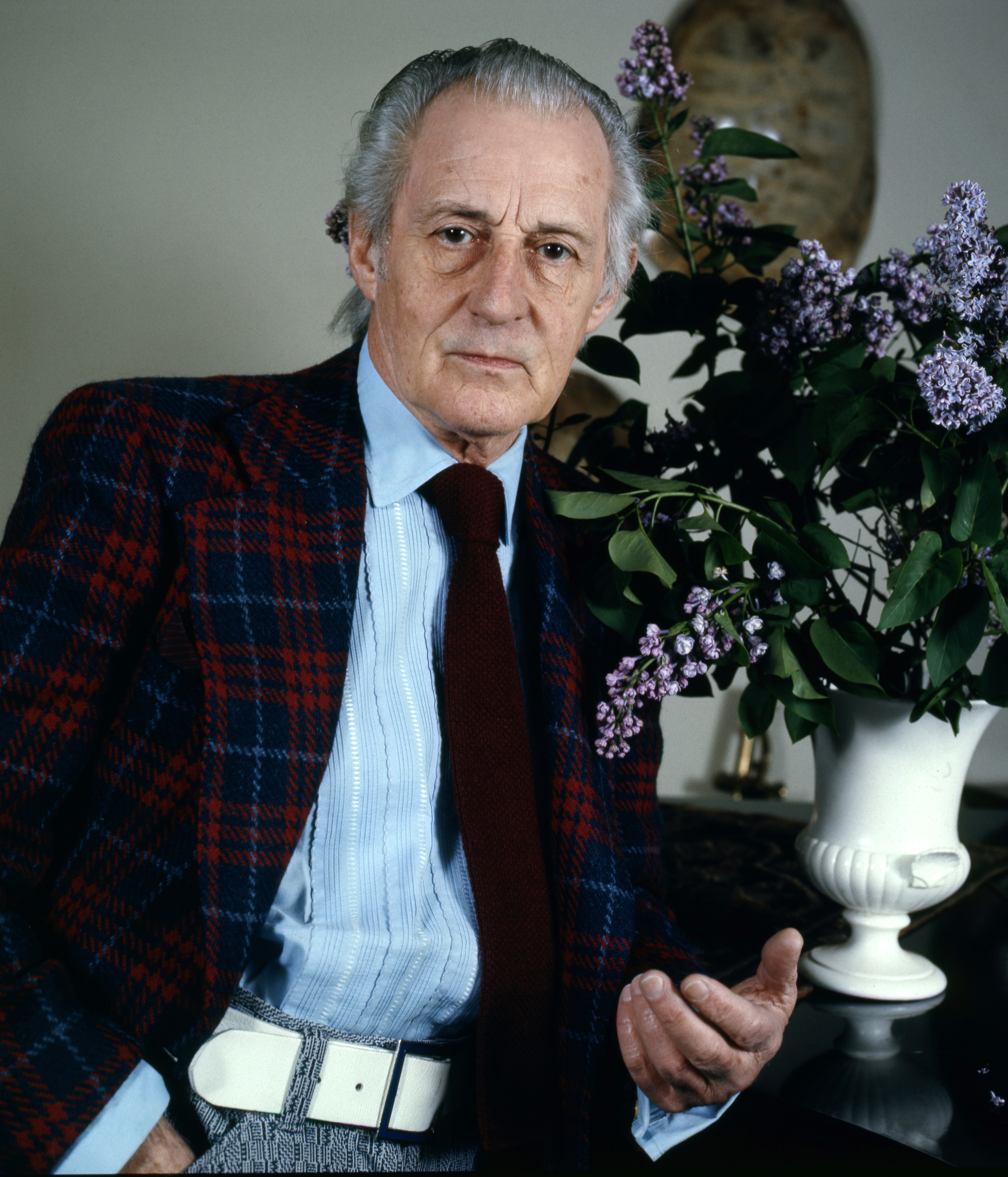
Anton Dolin

- 1 November – Rupert Byron, 11th Baron Byron, peer and politician (born 1903)
- 2 November
  - Michael Spice, actor (born 1931)
  - Tudor Watkins, Baron Watkins, politician (born 1903)
- 7 November – Sir Paget Bourke, judge (born 1906)
- 8 November
  - E. G. Bowen, Welsh geographer (born 1900)
  - Betty Nuthall, tennis player (born 1911)
- 9 November – Lionel Keir Robinson, bookseller (born 1897)
- 12 November – Clifford Grossmark, physician and football administrator (born 1914)
- 13 November
  - James Gornall, Royal Navy captain (born 1899)
  - Sir Gilbert Paull, judge (born 1896)
- 14 November – Barney Bubbles, graphic artist (suicide) (born 1942)
- 15 November
  - Eric Fraser, artist (born 1902)
  - John Le Mesurier, actor (born 1912)
  - Richard Stanley, politician (born 1920)
  - Sir Robert Christopher Stafford Stanley, colonial administrator (born 1899)
  - Sir Geoffrey Thompson, Army lieutenant-general (born 1905)
- 16 November
  - Sir Geoffrey Rhodes Bromet, RAF vice-marshal and Lieutenant Governor of the Isle of Man (1945–1952) (born 1891)
  - Margaret Lawder, botanist (born 1899)
- 17 November – Geoffrey Clifton-Brown, politician (born 1899)
- 19 November – Tom Evans, musician (suicide) (born 1947)
- 20 November
  - Lucy Middleton, politician (born 1894)
  - Brenda Ryman, biochemist (born 1922)
- 22 November – Grahame Farr, maritime historian (born 1912)
- 23 November – Sir Evelyn Barker, Army general (born 1894)
- 25 November – Sir Anton Dolin, dancer and choreographer (born 1904)
- 26 November – Sir Hedley Atkins, surgeon (born 1905)
- 28 November – Richard Scott, physician (born 1914)
- 30 November – Richard Llewellyn, novelist (born 1906)

=== December ===
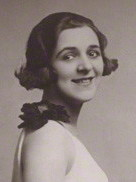
Norah Blaney

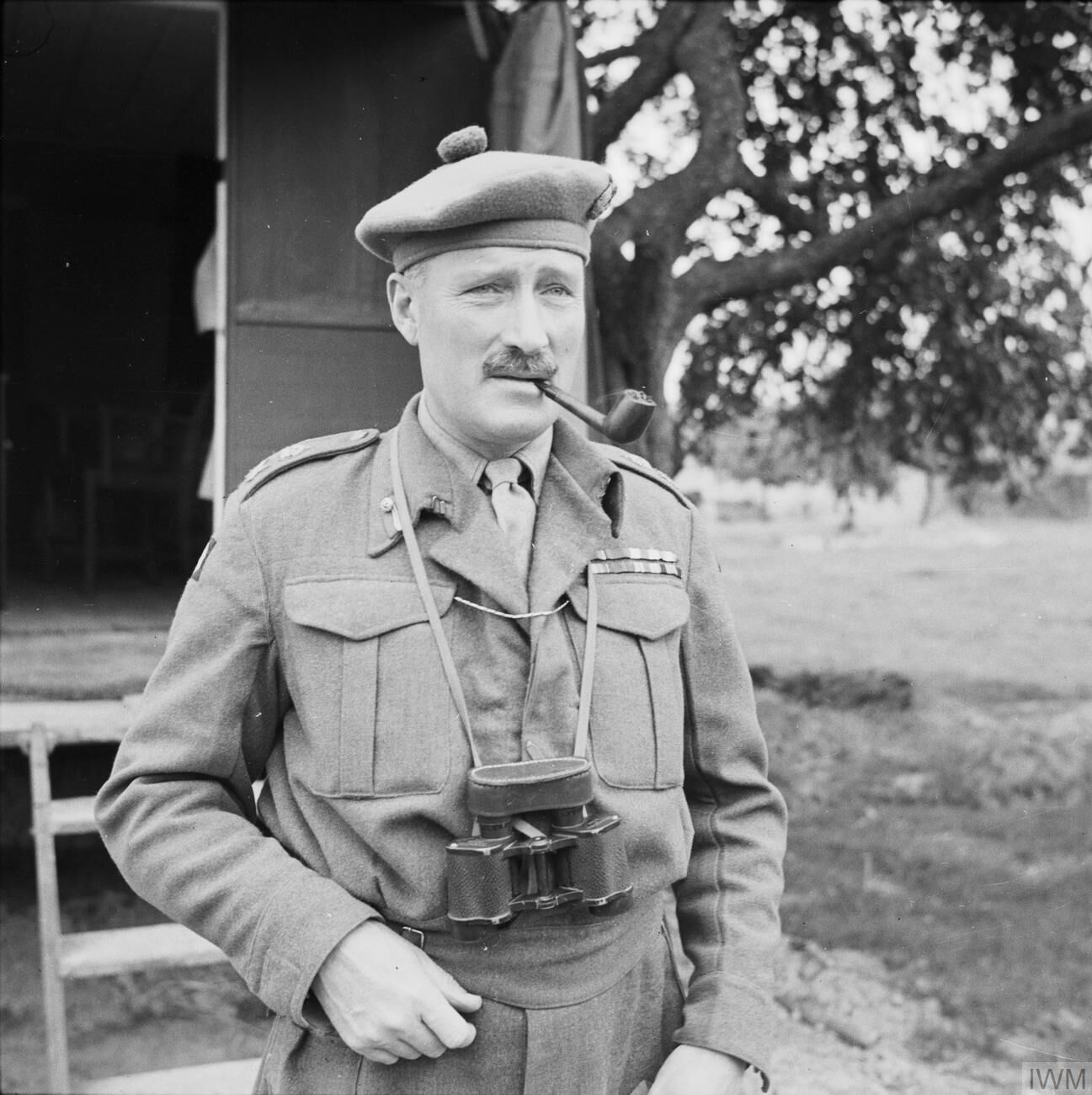
Neil Ritchie

- 2 December – Muriel St. Clare Byrne, historian (born 1895)
- 4 December
  - Maurice Browning, actor (born 1919)
  - Sir Anthony Rumbold, 10th Baronet, diplomat (born 1911)
  - Phil Scott, boxer (born 1900)
- 5 December – Lyndall Urwick, management consultant (born 1891)
- 6 December – Kenneth Farnhill, Royal Navy rear-admiral (born 1913)
- 7 December
  - Norah Blaney, comedienne and pianist (born 1893)
  - Edgar Graham, Northern Irish politician (murdered by the IRA) (born 1954)
- 8 December – Monica Harrison, opera singer (born 1897)
- 10 December – Saville Garner, diplomat (born 1908)
- 11 December
  - Norah, Lady Docker, socialite (born 1906)
  - Sir Neil Ritchie, general in World War II (born 1897)
- 13 December – Mary Renault, novelist (born 1905)
- 15 December
  - Sir James Bowker, diplomat (born 1901)
  - David Markham, actor (born 1913)
- 16 December – Robert King, Army major-general (born 1904)
- 17 December – Edith Wightman, archaeologist (murdered in Canada) (born 1938)
- 18 December
  - Victor Turner, anthropologist (born 1920)
  - Arthur Joseph Wrigley, gynaecologist (born 1902)
- 19 December – Cameron Hall, actor (born 1897)
- 20 December – Bill Brandt, photojournalist (born 1904, German Empire)
- 22 December
  - Renée Bickerstaff, Northern Irish artist (born 1904)
  - Charles Lloyd-Pack, actor (born 1902)
- 23 December
  - Rupert Alec-Smith, historian (born 1913)
  - Colin Middleton, artist (born 1910)
  - Harry Pilkington, glass manufacturer (born 1905)
- 24 December
  - Doris Chambers, golfer (born 1884)
  - Alan Melville, writer, actor and broadcaster (born 1910)
  - Eric Williams, RAF pilot and writer (born 1911)
- 26 December – Violet Carson, actress (born 1898)
- 27 December – Donald Caskie, Scottish Presbyterian minister (born 1902)
- 29 December – Janet Webb, actress (born 1930)
- 30 December – Violette Cordery, racing driver (born 1900)
- 31 December – Sir Harold Warris Thompson, chemist and spectroscopist (born 1908)

== See also ==
- 1983 in British music
- 1983 in British television
- List of British films of 1983
