= Anna Tait =

- Died: 1635; Haddington, East Lothian, Scotland
- Cause of death: Capital punishment (strangulation and burning)
- Known for: Accused of witchcraft
- Spouse: William Johnston (miller)

Anna Tait (also spelled Anne Tait), sometimes referred to as Hononni, was a Scottish woman accused of witchcraft in Haddington, East Lothian in 1634. She was executed in 1635. Her case centered on her expressions of grief and guilt, including suicidal ideation, related to the murder of her first husband and the death of her daughter following a failed home abortion.

== Background ==
Historian and witchcraft expert Louise Yeoman notes that Tait's name does not appear in the Sourcebook of Scottish Witchcraft by Christina Larner, which has been regarded as the most authoritative reference on Scottish witchcraft since its publication in 1977. This omission occurred because Tait, along with nearly a hundred other individuals accused of witchcraft, was unknown to the book's compilers at the time. Their names were instead preserved in an overlooked manuscript held by the National Library of Scotland.

During the preparation of the published volumes of the Register of the Privy Council of Scotland at the end of the 19th century, one volume of the Register of Commissions covering the years 1630–1642 was inadvertently omitted. As a result, hundreds of Privy Council commissions—many of which led to criminal trials—remained undocumented in secondary sources. Anna Tait's trial was among those overlooked.

Yeoman credits Dr. Michael Wasser, a historian specializing in crimes of violence in 16th- and 17th-century Scotland at McGill University, with rediscovering the manuscript and recognizing its significance.

=== Hononni ===
At some point in her life, Tait acquired the alias "Hononni", a Scottish variant of the English phrase "Hey nonny no!"—commonly heard in songs of the period. The nickname, with its lighthearted and nonsensical tone, was ironically jolly for Tait, whose life, according to historians, was marked by "murder, tragedy, and despair."

== Biography ==
Tait was married to William Johnston, a miller. According to pre-trial notes, she was first arrested on 18 December 1634 for attempting to take her own life by "hanging [herself] in [her] courch [kerchief or headdress]."

Historian Louise Yeoman explains:

"In 17th century terms suicide was one of the most heinous acts one could commit. It was like witchcraft, considered to be a particularly odious crime against God’s law and it was punishable by forfeiture of the entire goods of the victim and by a dishonourable burial in unconsecrated ground."

=== John Coltart ===
While being questioned at the tolbooth, Tait confessed to the ministers and baillies of Haddington that 28 years earlier, while living in England, she had murdered her first husband, John Coltart, described as "ane aged man" and a nolt driver (cattle drover). She claimed to have poisoned him using a drink made from foxtree leaves. According to her confession, he died within three hours of consuming the mixture. Tait stated that she had married Coltart in 1606 at a place referred to as "Furd Kirk" in England.

=== Elisabeth Johnston ===
Tait also confessed to the murder of her daughter from her second marriage, Elizabeth Johnston. According to the confession, Elizabeth had died following a botched home abortion. Tait admitted to preparing a concoction—ane mutchkin (a Scottish pint)—made from white wine and salt, which she gave to her daughter to terminate an unwanted pregnancy. Elizabeth consumed the drink at her mother’s urging.

Tait refused to disclose the identity of the child’s father and was subsequently accused of having "sought all means to kill, to murther the child in her belly, that it might not come to light who was the father thereof, or how it was gotten, whether in adultery or incest, or what other unlawful way."

Shortly after ingesting the mixture, Elizabeth began to swell, and soon thereafter both she and the unborn child died.

=== Detention and interrogation ===
During interrogation, leading questions prompted Tait to confess that she had consulted with the Devil in committing her crimes, and that he had instructed her on how to prepare both fatal drinks. According to her confession, the Devil appeared to her at home in the likeness of a man and engaged in sexual intercourse with her in her bed. He allegedly returned on 11 December 1634, seized her by the hair, and marked her with a "nip" on her left cheek.

Tait had initially arrived at the tolbooth on 18 December 1634, describing herself as suicidal and “trublit in conscienc[e]”. Under coercive interrogation, she expanded her confession to include charges of murder, witchcraft, and adultery. She admitted that her relationship with her second husband, William Johnston, had begun while she was still married to her first husband: “before the marriage she had sundry times committed fornication with William Johnston, her present husband, and that within the time of the marriage she had likewise committed adultery with him.”

Tait was the only accused witch in this period whose trial is recorded in Haddington’s burgh court records. While awaiting trial, she reportedly attempted to hang herself and later tried to slit her throat with a knife. Even with her hands bound and her feet placed in stocks, she continued to attempt self-harm by striking her head against the wall and the stocks. During her imprisonment, it was further alleged that she had made a pact with the Devil, who visited her in the form of a black man and, at other times, as the wind, with whom she was also said to have had sexual relations.

== The trial ==
Tait's trial took place on 6 January 1635.

During the proceedings, the prosecutor asked whether she wished to call anyone to speak in her defence. Tait declined, reportedly replying that she wanted “nane [none] but God in heavin.” She was found guilty and sentenced to death.

== Death ==
Anna Tait went to her death "in despair, unreconciled with her community and with God."

It was given for doom [sentence] by the mouth of William Sinclair dempster [pronouncer of sentence] that the said Anna Tait should be taken, her hands bound behind her back and conveyed by William Allot, lockman [executioner] of Haddington to the ordinary place of execution, and there wirried [strangled] to the death at ane post and thereafter her body to be burnt in ashes, desuper act.

Tait was strangled and her body subsequently burned at the stake in Haddington.

== Legacy ==
Historian Louise Yeoman argues that the case of Anna Tait raises the question of whether the tragedy would have occurred had Tait lived in a different time:

"To a 17th century society she was such a paragon of horror that the Devil had to be invoked to explain her conduct. In a society which stressed a woman’s subordination to her husband and saw her only rightful adult roles being those of a wife or a mother, Anna was a monster.... In 21st century Scotland, Anna would have been able to obtain a divorce from her first husband and her daughter would have been able to obtain an abortion. So the whole catalogue of tragedy might not have happened at all, or then again, perhaps it might. Was Anna a victim of a society which stacked the cards against women through its interpretation of the Bible or was she the sort of callous person who might have murdered a spouse despite all the advantages of a modern legal system. After all, the murders of spouses still occur. These are questions the historian can only raise and cannot answer."

Professor Julian Goodare places the case in the broader context of how the Scottish Church understood the causes of witchcraft. In 1643, the General Assembly declared that the causes of witchcraft were "especially, extremity of grief, malice, passion, and desire of revenge, pinching povertie, solicitation of other Witches and Charmers; for in such cases the devil assails them, offers aide, and much prevails."

Goodare notes that while many of these causes—such as malice—fit expected patterns of early modern thinking, it is striking that "extremity of grief" appears first in the list. He argues that this points to the need for historians to examine more closely the connections between accusations of witchcraft and the psychological trauma of the accused.

These links seem obvious for Anna Tait... Tait had an awful domestic background, was ‘thrie several times deprehendit putting violent hands in herself at her awne hous’, and was convinced that her wickedness was due to the Devil, before she was accused of witchcraft in 1634.
— J. Goodare, Witchcraft and Belief in Early Modern Scotland

=== Thirty years after Tait's death ===
It was thirty years later, during the panic of 1662, that later generations of Scottish Privy Councillors re-examined the issue of confessions made by those who were suicidal or mentally disturbed, ultimately reaching a different conclusion. It was then strictly mandated that commissions for criminal trials and the execution of convicted witches could only be approved if it was confirmed that "at the tyme of their confessions they were of right judgement, nowayes distracted or under any earnest desyre to die."

However, this shift in policy and growing sensitivity came too late for Anna Tait.
