= Elsie Abbot =

British civil servant

Dame Elsie Abbot DBE
- Born: Elsie Myrtle Tostevin; 3 September 1907; Streatham, London, England, UK
- Died: 26 May 1983 (aged 75)
- Education: St Hugh's College, Oxford
- Occupations: Civil servant Under-secretary at HM Treasury

Dame Elsie Myrtle Abbot, DBE (née Tostevin; 3 September 1907 – 26 May 1983) was a senior British civil servant. She joined the administrative section of the Home Civil Service in 1930, and originally worked in the Post Office.

In 1947, she moved to HM Treasury where she spent the rest of her career. She rose to become Third Secretary between 1958 and 1967. She was amongst the first female civil servants who were allowed to continue in her job after marrying.

== Early life and education ==
Elsie Myrtle Tostevin was born on 3 September 1907 in Streatham, London, England. She was educated at Clapham County Secondary School, an all-girls state school in Clapham, London. She attended St Hugh's College, Oxford, graduating with first class honours in modern history in 1929 and first class honours in philosophy, politics and economics in 1930, thereby achieving a double first.

== Career ==
On 17 October 1930, following "open competition", she entered the civil service in the junior grade of the administrative class and was assigned to the General Post Office. In 1938, she married E. A. Arnott, and was one of the first women, if not the first, to be allowed to keep her civil service job after marriage. Together they had a son and a daughter.

In 1947, following the Second World War, she was transferred to Her Majesty's Treasury where she went on to become a deputy permanent secretary specialising in management. Also in 1947, she married for a second time to Derry Abbot, a fellow civil servant. She served as Third Secretary of HM Treasury, the third most senior civil servant in the department, from 1958 until her retirement in 1967.

== Honours ==
In the 1957 Queen's Birthday Honours, Abbot was appointed Commander of the Order of the British Empire (CBE) for her work as an under-secretary at HM Treasury. In the 1966 New Year Honours, she was promoted to Dame Commander of the Order of the British Empire (DBE) for her work as Third Secretary of HM Treasury, and thereafter referred to as Dame Elsie Abbot.
