= Kenneth Roberts-Wray =

British lawyer and civil servant (1899–1983)

Sir Kenneth Roberts-Wray GCMG, QC
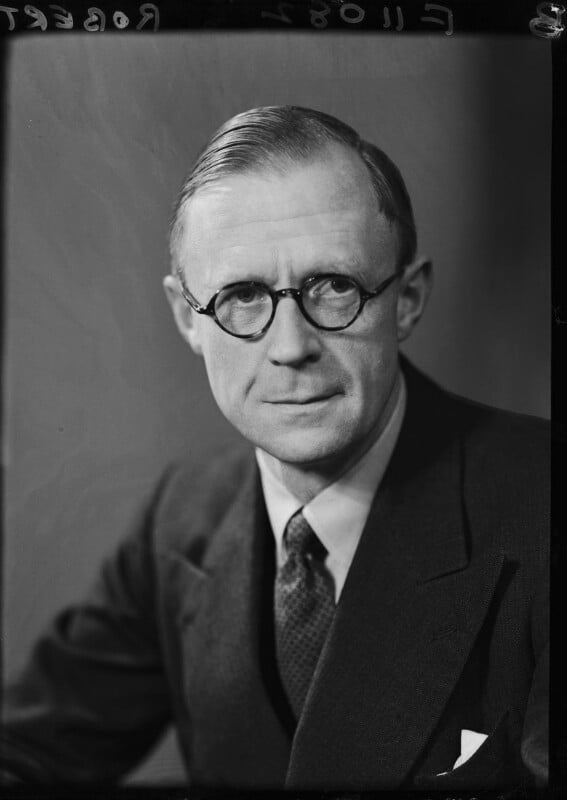
- Roberts-Wray in 1949
- Born: Kenneth Owen Roberts-Wray; 6 June 1899
- Died: 29 August 1983 (aged 84)
- Education: Merton College, Oxford
- Occupations: Lawyer; civil servant
- Spouses: Joan Tremayne Waring (m. 1927; died 1961); Lady (Mary Howard) Williams (m. 1965)

Sir Kenneth Owen Roberts-Wray GCMG, QC (1899–1983) was a British lawyer and civil servant. An authority on Commonwealth and colonial law, he was Legal Adviser to the Commonwealth Relations Office (Dominions Office until 1947) and the Colonial Office from 1945 to 1960.

== Biography ==
Born 6 June 1899, Kenneth Roberts-Wray was the son of Captain Thomas Henry Roberts-Wray, sometime aide-de-camp to King George V, and of Florence Grace Roberts-Wray. He was educated at University Tutorial College, Royal Military Academy, Woolwich, and Merton College, Oxford, where he took first-class honours in jurisprudence.

During the First World War, Roberts-Wray was commissioned into the Royal Artillery as a second lieutenant in 1918, promoted to lieutenant in 1919, and retired from the army because of wounds in 1920. He was called to the bar in 1924, receiving the Certificate of Honour at the bar examinations. Joining the Civil Service in 1926, he joined the Ministry of Health as a Professional Legal Clerk, before being promoted Assistant Chief Clerk in 1929.

He transferred to the Dominions Office and the Colonial Office in 1931 as Second Assistant Legal Adviser, and was promoted to Assistant Legal Adviser in 1943, and Legal Adviser in 1945. During his tenure, he took part in numerous pre-independence constitutional conferences as legal adviser, the last one being the constitutional conference leading to the independence of Nigeria in 1960.

In retirement, Roberts-Wray was the author of Commonwealth and Colonial Law (Stevens, 1966), a seminal work in that area. From January to June 1969, he served as Acting Attorney-General of Gibraltar. He died on 29 August 1983.

== Family ==
Roberts-Wray firstly married in 1927 Joan Tremayne Waring (died 1961); they had three sons. After he death, he married secondly, in 1965, Lady (Mary Howard) Williams, widow of Sir Ernest Williams.

== Honours ==
Roberts-Wray was appointed a Companion of the Order of St Michael and St George in 1946, promoted Knight Commander in 1949, and Knight Grand Cross in 1960. In 1959, he was appointed a Queen's Counsel. He received an honorary DCL from the University of Oxford in 1967 and an honorary LLD from the University of Birmingham in 1968.
