= Robert MacIntyre Gordon =

Scottish World War I flying ace

- Born: 30 September 1899; Glasgow, Scotland
- Died: 19 April 1983 (aged 83); Colchester, Essex
- Military career
- Allegiance: United Kingdom
- Branch: Royal Navy; Royal Air Force
- Rank: Lieutenant
- Nickname: "Bobby"
- Unit: No. 4 Naval Squadron RNAS/No. 204 Squadron RAF
- Awards: Distinguished Flying Cross

Lieutenant Robert MacIntyre Gordon (30 September 1899 – 19 April 1983) was a Glasgow-born seventeen-year-old World War I flying ace. He was credited with nine aerial victories as a Sopwith Camel pilot for the Royal Naval Air Service in 1918. Postwar, he became a medical doctor.

== Early life ==
Robert MacIntyre Gordon was born in Queen's Park, Glasgow, Scotland on 30 September 1899.

== World War I ==
During World War I, Gordon became a Sopwith Camel fighter pilot for 4 Squadron of the Royal Naval Air Service. He remained with this unit when it was incorporated into the Royal Air Force as 204 Squadron. Between 30 June and 27 October 1918, he scored nine aerial victories and won a Distinguished Flying Cross for his bravery. His DFC was gazetted on 2 November 1918:

In three months this brilliant young pilot has destroyed or driven down eight enemy machines. On all occasions he displays remarkable gallantry and dash, never hesitating to fly to the assistance of other pilots when they are in difficulties. In one combat his action saved his flight commander.

On 29 September 1918, he was wounded and hospitalized. Freed from bed rest in early October, he was sent on leave. Upon return to duty, he scored his last victory on 27 October but was wounded again in the process. He sat out the rest of the war.

=== Combat record ===
List of aerial victories
No.	Date/time	Aircraft	Foe	Result	Location	Notes
1	30 June 1918 @ 1430 hours	Sopwith Camel serial number D1868	German reconnaissance plane	Driven down out of control	Zeebrugge	
2	30 June 1918 @ 1440 hours	Sopwith Camel s/n D1868	Fokker D.VII	Driven down out of control	Zeebrugge	
3	31 July 1918 @ 1930 hours	Sopwith Camel s/n D8146	Fokker D.VII	Driven down out of control	Northeast of Ypres	
4	12 August 1918 @ 1055 hours	Sopwith Camel s/n D9498	Fokker D.VII	Destroyed	Blankenberge	
5	12 August 1918 @ 1055 hours	Sopwith Camel s/n D9498	Fokker D.VII	Driven down out of control	Blankenberge	
6	15 August 1918 @ 1900 hours	Sopwith Camel s/n D8145	Fokker D.VII	Set afire; destroyed	Menen	Victory shared with Charles Hickey
7	15 August 1918 @ 1900 hours	Sopwith Camel s/n D8145	Fokker D.VII	Set afire; destroyed	Menen	
8	3 September 1918 @ 1150 hours	Sopwith Camel s/n D8146	Fokker D.VII	Driven down out of control	Geluveld	
9	27 October 1918 @ 0910 hours	Sopwith Camel s/n F3929	Fokker D.VII	Set afire; destroyed	South of Ghent	

== Post World War I ==
Gordon qualified as a doctor in 1924. He was awarded a DSO and GM for his service during World War II. He died on 19 April 1983.
