= David Gray (sportswriter) =

British sports journalist (1927–1983)

David Gray (31 December 1927 – 6 September 1983) was a British sports journalist and editor who became a tennis administrator.

After graduating in English from the University of Birmingham, Gray worked for the Wolverhampton Express and Star, the Northern Daily Telegraph and the News Chronicle. In 1954 he joined The Guardian newspaper, then still called The Manchester Guardian, where he initially worked as a general reporter in Birmingham. He covered local elections and was a theatre critique. Gray was appointed as a tennis writer in 1956 when he volunteered to cover a tennis tournament in the north of England. He became a sports editor for The Guardian in 1961. In his writings Gray advocated the abolition of amateur tennis and the introduction of the open era. He became the Secretary General of the International Tennis Federation (ITF) under Philippe Chatrier in 1976 and held the position until his death in 1983. In that role he was involved in the reorganization of the Davis Cup and the reintroduction of tennis at the Olympic Games and contributed to the worldwide reach of the sport. In 1985 he was posthumously inducted into the International Tennis Hall of Fame as a contributor. The Women’s Tennis Association established the David Gray Service Award in his honor.

In 1988 a collection of his articles, Shades of Gray, was published, edited by Lance Tingay.

He was married to Margaret and they had four children.
