= Tom Dillon (rugby union) =

English rugby union player

Tom Dillon (born 1 October 1983) is a rugby union player previously with Newcastle Falcons in Premiership Rugby. His position of choice is as a centre.

== See also ==
- Rugby in the United Kingdom
