= Kenneth Farnhill =

Rear-Admiral Kenneth Farnhill CB OBE
- Born: Kenneth Haydn Farnhill; 13 April 1913
- Died: 6 December 1983 (aged 70)
- Military career
- Allegiance: United Kingdom
- Branch: Royal Navy
- Service years: 1930–1969
- Rank: Rear-Admiral
- Awards: CB, OBE

Rear-Admiral Kenneth Haydn Farnhill CB OBE (13 April 1913 – 6 December 1983) was a senior Royal Navy officer.

== Naval career ==
Born on 13 April 1913, Kenneth Farnhill was educated at Bedford School. He joined the Royal Navy in 1930 and served during the Second World War. Promoted to the rank of Rear Admiral in 1966, he was Director of the Management of Intelligence at the Ministry of Defence between 1966 and 1969. He retired from the Royal Navy in 1969 and was Secretary of the Defence, Press and Broadcasting Advisory Committee, responsible for issuing D-Notices, between 1973 and 1980.

Rear Admiral Kenneth Farnhill was invested as an Officer of the Order of the British Empire in 1945, and as a Companion of the Order of the Bath in 1968. He died on 6 December 1983.
