= Gilbert Paull =

Sir Gilbert Paull

Justice of the High Court
- In office 1957–1971

Personal details
- Born: Gilbert James Paull
- Children: 2
- Education: St Paul's School; Trinity College, Cambridge

Sir Gilbert James Paull (18 April 1896 – 13 November 1983) was an English barrister and High Court judge.

The son of Alan Paull, FSI, JP, Gilbert Paull was educated at St Paul's School and Trinity College, Cambridge. He was called to the Bar by the Inner Temple in 1920 and became a King's Counsel in 1939. Paul was elected a Bencher of Inner Temple 1946, Reader 1969, and Treasurer 1970. He was also a member of the Council of Legal Education from 1947 to 1965.

After sitting as Recorder of Leicester from 1944 to 1957, Paull was appointed a Justice of the High Court on 23 January 1957, receiving the customary knighthood. He was assigned to the Queen's Bench Division, where he sat until his retirement on 30 September 1971. He died in 1984. After his death, he was described as "one of the last of the "fashionable silks"".

Paull married Maud Winifred Harris, daughter of Charles Harris, of Streatham, in 1922; they had a son and a daughter. Lady Paull died in 1978.
