= Ryan Ashington =

English footballer (born 1983)

Personal information
- Full name: Ryan David Ashington
- Date of birth: 28 March 1983 (age 43)
- Place of birth: Torbay, England
- Height: 5 ft 10 in (1.78 m)
- Position: Midfielder

Youth career
- 1999–2001: Torquay United

Senior career*
Years	Team	Apps	(Gls)
2000–2002	Torquay United	16	(0)
2002–2003	Newport County	12	(1)
- * Club domestic league appearances and goals

Ryan David Ashington (born 28 March 1983) is an English former professional footballer. He was born in Paignton, Devon, England.

Ashington joined Torquay United as a trainee and due to almost the entire midfield being out injured, manager Wes Saunders was forced to throw him into the first-team well before he would have liked. In the end Ashington was named man of the match on his league debut at home to Southend United on 19 August 2000, making a further 13 league appearances by the end of the season, all before his 18th birthday. He signed a one-year professional contract in May 2001, but had yet to feature under new manager Roy McFarland, before sustaining an injury that forced him out for most of the 2001–02 season.

Out of the first team picture at Plainmoor, and with Torquay not having a reserve team on financial grounds, Ashington joined Newport County on loan on 5 December 2002, signing a full deal the following month. He made a good initial impression at Newport, but missed the end of the season due to glandular fever and failed to re-establish himself. He left Newport in September 2003.
