= James Dow (physician) =

Scottish physician (1911–1983)

James Findlay Dow FRCP (13 May 1911 – 24 September 1983) was a Scottish consultant physician who specialised in gastroenterology.

== Early life ==
James Findlay Dow was born in Glasgow and educated at Strathallan School in Perthshire and St John's College, Cambridge (BA Cantab, 1932); continuing his training at the Middlesex Hospital in London and graduating (MB BChir Cantab, 1936); attaining MRCP in 1938. In 1939, following house appointments at the Middlesex Hospital and Royal Brompton Hospital he was appointed resident assistant physician at St George's Hospital, which at that time was based at Hyde Park Corner.

== Physician ==
During World War II, Dow served with distinction at St George's Hospital, covering those physicians who were absent on military duty. Under his guidance the hospital remained operational throughout the Blitz. In 1944, he provided medical support for the surgical teams at Cosham, near Portsmouth, who had been sent there to receive the casualties from D Day.

In 1946, Dow was appointed honorary assistant physician at St George's. The following year he joined the Royal Army Medical Corps serving with the rank of major until the completion of his National Service in 1949. Dow was elected a Fellow of the Royal College of Physicians in 1948.

After the war it became apparent to Dow and some of his senior colleagues that St George's needed to function as a general hospital as well as a teaching hospital. In the early 1950s, he moved his firm from Hyde Park Corner to the Grove Fever Hospital in Tooting, south London.

Dow was consultant physician at St George's Hospital from 1948 to 1976 and at the King Edward VII Hospital for Officers from 1960 to 1976. He was also chairman of the medical committee at St George's, a member of the board of governors and one of the special trustees. Dow published numerous papers in medical journals on gastroenterology.

Dow served as chairman of the medical committee of King Edward VII Hospital for Officers (Sister Agnes), and as an examiner in medicine at the University of Cambridge and University of London for the Royal College of Physicians. He was an adviser to London Life Assurance, a member of the Association of Physicians of Great Britain and Ireland and the British Society of Gastroenterology.
