= Ken Hudson =

British rear gunner in heavy bombers (1915-1983)

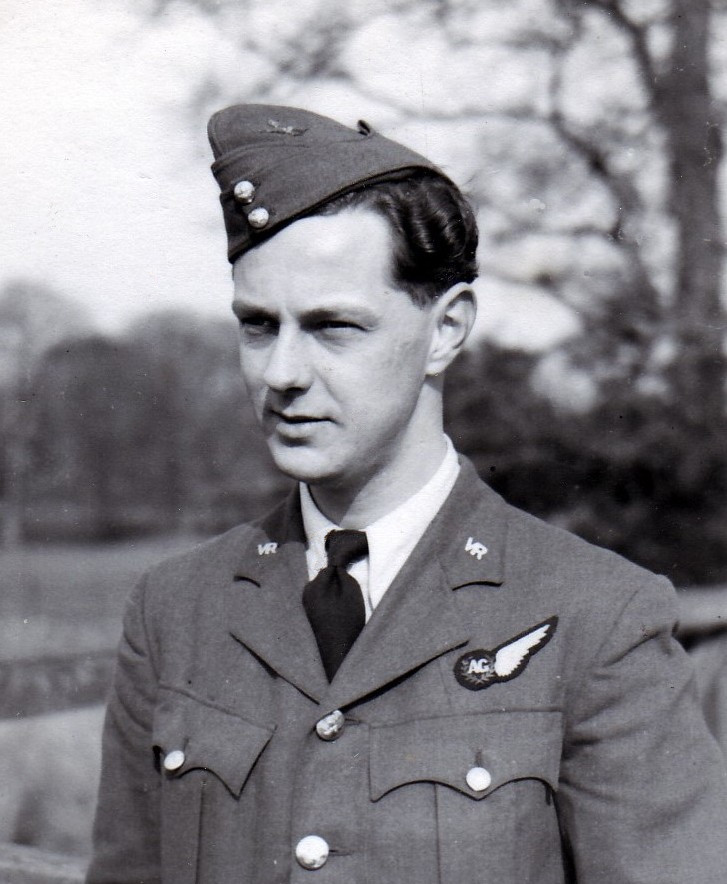
- Born: 17 December 1915; Balham, SW London, England
- Died: 22 March 1983 (aged 67); Croydon, Surrey, England
- Spouse: Pamela Mary Yates
- Military career
- Allegiance: United Kingdom
- Branch: Royal Air Force
- Service years: 1941–1945
- Rank: Flight Lieutenant
- Units: No. 214 Squadron RAF; No. 26 Operational Training Unit RAF; No. 115 Squadron RAF
- Awards: Distinguished Flying Cross

Kenneth Charles Hudson (27 December 1915 – 22 March 1983) was a British rear gunner in heavy bombers in World War II. For his gallantry in combat as a Flight Lieutenant in the Royal Air Force, he was awarded the Distinguished Flying Cross.

Hudson was born at Pentney Road, Balham, SW London and was educated at Balham Grammar School.

He enlisted in the Royal Air Force in April 1940 and after gunnery training at No. 12 Operational Training Unit RAF at Benson, joined No. 214 Squadron RAF. He flew on his first operational mission on 12 August 1941 as a rear gunner and over the next 13 months completed a total of 30 bombing missions in Wellington and Stirling heavy bombers. During this period he was twice prevented from flying due to a recurrent ear problem and on both occasions his plane was shot down with the loss of all crew.

In October 1942, Hudson married Pamela Yates, a primary school teacher. In June 1943 he attended a gunnery course at the Central Gunnery School at Sutton Bridge and then became an instructor in Fighter Affiliation at No. 26 Operational Training Unit, Wing. After attending a short course at No.3 Lancaster Finishing School, Feltwell in November 1944, he resumed operational duties and flew a further 14 missions with No. 115 Squadron RAF as rear gunner in the Avro Lancaster.

In May 1945, Hudson was awarded the Distinguished Flying Cross 'in recognition of gallantry and devotion to duty in the execution of air operations.' In 1947 he joined the civil service and worked for the Ministry of Public Building and Works until his retirement in 1975.
