= Laurence Bagley =

English artist

Laurence Cyril Bagley
- Born: 20 October 1922; Southampton, England
- Died: 22 October 1983 (aged 61)
- Known for: Painting, writing

Laurence Cyril Bagley (20 October 1922 – 22 October 1983) was an English artist. Best known for his marine and aviation paintings, he was also a writer and illustrator.

== Early life and career ==
His father, Cyril Lawrence Bagley was a carpenter, builder and architect and his mother was Madeline Elizabeth Bennett. Between 1927 and 1933 he attended Lee-on-the-Solent County Primary School and went on to study at Gosport Grammar School until he was fourteen. Throughout his early years it is said he only ever wanted to be an artist.

In 1938 his father found him an apprenticeship as a draftsman at Airspeed Ltd. The company had recently relocated from York to Portsmouth Airfield. He suffered ill health as a teenager and at the age of 18 contracted meningitis and was admitted to hospital. In April 1940 the Airspeed design team moved from Portsmouth to Hatfield as part of a streamlining following their takeover by de Havilland. It is thought that he moved north with the company to complete his apprenticeship. During his time as a draughtsman at Airspeed Bagley drew what has now become the definitive cutaway drawing of the Horsa troop carrying glider.

He moved to Leighton Buzzard and worked at Eaton Bray as a staff artist at Aeromodeller magazine. During his time with the magazine (and its sister publications: Model Maker, Model Boats, Scale Models, Model Cars, Model Railway News) he produced almost one hundred cover paintings, designed and drew model aircraft plans, and contributed numerous line illustrations for the magazine. He continued to paint occasional cover pictures for the magazine in the 1960s and early 70s. It was in Aeromodeller's offices at Eaton Bray that he met Kathleen Grant (Judy), who was working there as a tracer. The office romance flourished and in June 1947 they were married in Aldershot. They moved back to southern England where they rented a flat in Old Portsmouth. In 1950 their daughter Lindsey was born, and in 1953 their son Russell.

== Going freelance ==
Through most of the 1950s Bagley worked at HMS Vernon, a naval shore station in Portsmouth as a civilian Technical Illustrator. He worked in a small team producing artwork for educational and training films. The Admiralty pay rates were low in those austere times, so of necessity Bagley continued developing his freelance work in his spare time. His Holy Grail was to have a Flight magazine cover published. Time after time he sent paintings off on the train to London only to have them rejected until finally one was accepted. This was a tipping point in his career and more work began to come in from Flight and other publications. He also received commissions to provide artwork for railway posters for British Rail. In 1958 he finally left his secure position at Vernon to become a freelance artist.

In 1953, as a commemoration of Queen Elizabeth's Coronation year, the government commissioned a number of artists, most of them famous, but also some upstarts, to paint pictures of the coronation. The then Ministry of Works commissioned three of Bagley's: The Procession Passing the Cenotaph plus Police Assembling at Dawn, Whitehall and Decorations in Whitehall, Coronation, June 1953. All three paintings are still in public ownership, under the auspices of the Government Art Collection. To this day the first of these paintings hangs in the Foreign and Commonwealth Office in central London in an office overlooking Downing Street.

== Books ==
In the same year Bagley's first book, How to Fly was published by Blackie and Son, followed by The Boy's Book of Aircraft in 1954. Both books were generously illustrated. A glowing review in Flight magazine of 1953 says: "... Mr. Bagley is up to date, knows his subject, writes in a breezy manner and—above all— has illustrated his book with his own excellent drawings in black and white and colour."

In 1956 the growing Bagley family bought their first home, a newly built semi-detached house in Bedhampton. Bagley rented a small studio in Havant where he worked above Gardeners picture framing shop. They moved again in 1959 to a larger house in Lee-on-the-Solent where a spare bedroom was converted into a studio. His south facing upstairs room provided views over the Solent (until the late 70's when a block of flats was built behind the house).

== Commercial art ==
At about this time he struck up a working friendship with Colin Paine of Embassy Art Agency (previously Astral Arts.) Between 1957 and 1968 Colin secured work for him with various clients including a David Brown Tractors calendar (1957), the prestigious launch brochure of the SS Canberra for P&O (1958), commercial artwork for Nuffield Tractors (BMC), brochures for Wolseley Cars and many others. He painted a number of pictures for "Good Companion" jigsaw puzzles and even a few "painting by numbers" commissions.

== Prints ==
In 1968 Bagley painted The Lone Sailor, a dramatic, stormy scene from Sir Alec Rose's famous solo circumnavigation. Alec Rose finished his journey in Portsmouth on 4 July 1968; fine art prints, cards and postcards were on sale widely, the same picture was used as the cover for Rose's book of his epic voyage: My Lively Lady. This was commercially his most successful and famous painting.

The success of The Lone Sailor precipitated more commissions for prints including Harbour Twilight (1969), an atmospheric view from a Gosport boatyard across Portsmouth Harbour, and The Revenue Cutter (1970), a night scene of a Bristol Channel Pilot Cutter.

== Naval and military paintings ==
Throughout the 70's Bagley painted dozens of impressions of Vosper Thornycroft warships, hovercraft and weapon systems which were widely reproduced in the company's sales literature, and many of the originals graced the walls of Vosper's boardrooms. In 1972 Bagley painted a set of illustrations for Christopher Dawson's history of Vosper Thornycroft: A Quest for Speed at Sea.

Westland Aircraft Limited of Yeovil also used Bagley artwork for promotional literature of their helicopters. Throughout the 60s and 70s he painted vivid and dramatic scenes of the military and civilian variants of their aircraft. In the early 60's when Westland began to develop the hovercraft at the Saunders-Roe site (later to become The British Hovercraft Corporation) at Cowes, Isle of Wight, he painted dozens of artists impressions of their proposed new designs.

== Sailing ==
Laurence Bagley maintained a working relationship with the staff at Yachting Monthly in particular with the then editor, Des Sleightholme. He produced a number of cover paintings for the magazine during the early 80s, along with some bundled giveaways which included posters and prints. Several of their articles were published with Bagley illustrations. He also produced the odd cover illustration for their rival publication, Practical Boat Owner during the same period.

He had been a keen yachtsman for years, sailing mainly with an old friend who owned an 8-ton McGruer sloop. He spent many a sailing weekend away, sometimes crossing the channel to Cherbourg, or port hopping around the Solent. It was said that he was not an ideal crew, he was always grabbing his sketchbook. Eventually Bagley aspired to be the captain of his own ship, and in 1965 bought his own yacht, a 6-ton Hillyard "Fjord" which he kept on the River Hamble. Most weekends in the summer were spent sailing with his family around the Solent, usually ending up at the Folly Inn for dinner on Saturday night.

== Death ==
On 22 October 1983, two days after his 61st birthday, Laurence Bagley died. In a tribute published in the January 1984 issue of Yachting Monthly:

"For Laurence it had to be right. We commissioned him to paint a picture of the RNLI (Royal National Lifeboat Institution) service to the crippled motorship Bonita drifting in a December hurricane in mid channel. After lengthy research with the coxswain and technical experts of the RNLI he brought us not one but two paintings." He told us: "You see I couldn't get it out of my mind, the splendour of the thing, the courage." In the event both were used, one presented to Coxswain Mike Scales and the other used in YM and then sold to the highest bidder; Laurence Bagley's personal tribute to the RNLI."
