= Percival Siebold =

British scouting administrator (1917-1983)

Executive Commissioner for Operations of the World Scout Bureau

Personal details
- Born: Percival Alfred Siebold; 13 June 1917 Sutton, London, England
- Died: 1 June 1983 (aged 65) Stoke-on-Trent, Staffordshire, England

Percival Alfred Siebold (13 June 1917 – 1 June 1983) was a British scouting administrator who served as the Executive Commissioner for Operations of the World Scout Bureau.

In 1967, Siebold was awarded the 48th Bronze Wolf, the only distinction of the World Organization of the Scout Movement, awarded by the World Scout Committee for exceptional services to world Scouting.
