= Arthur Kirby =

Sir Arthur Frank Kirby, GBE, CMG (13 July 1899 – 13 January 1983) was a British railway administrator, diplomat, and public servant. He was general manager of East African Railways and Harbours from 1953 to 1957, Commissioner for East Africa in London from 1958 to 1963, and chairman of the British Transport Docks Board from 1963 to 1967.
