= Christina Larner =

British historian

- Born: Christina Jessy Ross; 22 September 1933; London, England
- Died: 27 April 1983 (aged 49); Glasgow, Scotland
- Education: University of Edinburgh
- Occupation: Historian
- Employer: University of Glasgow
- Spouse: John Patrick Larner
- Children: 2

Christina Larner (22 September 1933 – 27 April 1983) was a British historian with pioneering studies about European witchcraft and a Professor of Sociology at the University of Glasgow. She was an expert on the history of witchcraft in Scotland.

== Early life and education ==
Christina Larner was born in London, the daughter of Helen Margaret Wallace and John MacDonald Ross, senior civil servant, who both went to university. After attending South Hampstead High School for Girls (London), she matriculated and graduated with first class honours in Modern History in 1957 at the University of Edinburgh. She was awarded a PhD at the University of Edinburgh for her thesis 'Continental Influences on Scottish Demonology, 1560–1700’ in 1962.

== Academical career ==
After graduating from the University of Edinburgh, Larner moved to the University of Glasgow as a part-time assistant in the Department of Politics and Sociology in 1966. In 1972, she was appointed Lecturer in Sociology and was subsequently Senior Lecturer. She was awarded a titular professorship at the University of Glasgow in the same year as she died.

Photograph of Christina Larner

== Personal life ==
In 1960, she married John Patrick Larner, a historian of Renaissance Italy. They had two sons, Patrick and Gavin.

== Selected list of published works ==
- A Source-book of Scottish witchcraft (1977, 2005)
- Enemies of God (1981)
- Witchcraft and Religion (1984)
- The Thinking Peasant (1982) Glasgow: Pressgang ISBN 0946025207
