= JML Direct TV =

Series of British television shopping channels owned by John Mills Limited

- Country: United Kingdom
- Headquarters: London

Programming
- Picture format: 576i (SDTV 4:3, 16:9)

Ownership
- Owner: JML Direct Limited

History
- Launched: 1 October 2002; 23 years ago
- Replaced: eeZee tv (3 March 2007) iBuy, iBuy2 (28 May 2007); Vector 24/7, Shop Vector + (27 December 2007); TV Warehouse, TV Warehouse 2 (2 February 2009)
- Closed: 28 March 2024; 23 months ago
- Replaced by: Must Have Ideas TV

Links
- Website: www.jmldirect.com

JML Direct TV was a television shopping channel owned by JML Direct Limited that mainly broadcast infomercials featuring various products from the company. The channel was broadcast on Sky and Freesat.

JML Direct TV originally launched on Sky channel 664, on 1 October 2002 as JML Direct. Due to various Sky EPG reshuffles, this original channel is located on channel 661 as of 2018. It is on Sky in the UK, but not in Ireland since the summer of 2020. The channel closed on 28 March 2024.

== Channels ==
JML owned and ran a TV channel on Sky 661 and Freesat 806.

== Development of the network ==
Following on from the launch of the original JML Direct channel, there have been a number of changes and expansions of the JML lineup. The majority of these changes have affected channels on the Sky platform, but some JML channels have also been made available on Freesat and Freeview and details of these operations are also listed below. The changes have taken place as follows:

=== eeZee tv ===
eeZee tv logo

eeZee tv launched at 10:00 on 1 March 2005, taking the place of the original JML Direct channel, showing a mix of JML and Kleeneze products ranging from Homewares to Beauty. The channel used a fixed price format, which was similar to other UK shopping channels, such as QVC and Ideal World.

The venture proved to be a failure, as live programmes were axed after a few months on the air, and Kleeneze pulled out in late 2006.

On 3 March 2007, JML regained the EPG slot and rebranded it back to JML Direct TV. The channel continued to show various JML products, using ex-eeZee tv presenters and studios for some pre-recorded JML infomercials.

=== Expansion ===
In early 2007, JML secured a deal with HSN to take over the Sky EPG slots belonging to their shopping networks iBuy and iBuy2, which HSN had previously put the slots up for sale after announcing the closure of iBuy. The slots were located on top of the Shopping EPG on 631 and 632 (next to QVC).

On 25 April 2007, JML announced a joint-venture infomercial channel with Responze TV's US subsidiary Reliant International Media called Showcase TV, which would showcase a mix of US and international infomercials from Reliant’s product range.

On 1 May 2007, JML officially took over the IBuy slots and announced that they would be officially rebranded on 28 May, with 631 becoming JML Direct TV, with 632 becoming the joint-venture channel with Responze and the 667 slot being renamed as JML Extra. The joint-venture was finalised as Shop Now TV.

=== Purchase of slots from Vector Direct ===
On 23 December 2007, Vector Direct, a fellow rival infomercial company, went into voluntary liquidation, Vector operated two networks - Vector 24/7 and Shop Vector + on the Sky EPG numbers 652 and 656 respectively, and both were put up for sale. On 27 December 2007, it was announced that JML would purchase both slots.

On 7 January 2008, the main JML networks went under temporary names - JML Direct TV was renamed JML Direct 1 on Sky 631, while the Shop Now TV format was dropped completely, with the network becoming JML Direct 2. Many of the Shop Now TV infomercials were dropped, though those products which JML decided to retain in their lineup would continue to appear, though now under the JML brand. JML Extra on 657 remained as it was. On 28 January 2008, it was announced that JML had successfully purchased the Vector Direct networks and revealed that all the JML networks would be renamed.

- JML Direct 1 (631) became simply JML TV
- JML Direct 2 (632) became JML Lifestyle
- Vector 24/7 (652) became JML Choice
- Shop Vector + (656) became JML Innovation (originally JML Ideas)
- JML Extra (657) became JML Solutions

=== Further rebrandings ===
On 6 May 2008, as part of the official launch of the Freesat platform, JML Lifestyle was added on channel 810.

On 21 July 2008, a complete EPG reshuffle of the 'Shopping' section on Sky happened as the majority of channels were shifted down 10 EPG slots to make more room in the 'Kids' section. As a result, the JML channels moved to 641, 642, 662, 666 and 667.

On 6 September 2008, JML secured a slot for an affiliated jewellery channel Rocks & Co. to launch on 642, replacing JML Lifestyle. On the same day, JML Solutions (Sky 667) was rebranded as the cookery-focused JML Cookshop and two weeks later on 23 September 2008, JML Innovation (666) was rebranded as the health and beauty-focused JML BeautyShop on Sky channel 666. Both network used different coloured schemes, with Cookshop using green graphics, and BeautyShop using pink graphics. On 28 October 2008, JML Lifestyle's slot on Freesat was replaced with JML Cookshop. On 11 November 2008, JML TV was added to Freesat, on channel 809.

=== Purchase of slots from TV Warehouse, Freeview launch ===
In late 2008, JML purchased two channels which had broadcast under the TV Warehouse name. For a time, JML continued to broadcast TV Warehouse products and continued to use the TV Warehouse branding, with the only noticeable changes being the addition of a titlecard featuring both the TV Warehouse and JML logos, and the rebranding of the channel TV Warehouse Select as TV Warehouse 2.

On 22 January 2009, both JML and Rocks & Co. launched on Freeview as a programme block on channel 49. JML was available between 09:00 and 11:00, and 14:00 and 16:00. Rocks & Co. was also available between 16:00 and 21:00.

On 2 February 2009, TV Warehouse (Sky 653) was rebranded as the DIY-focused network JML Home & DIY while TV Warehouse 2 (Sky 661) was rebranded Shop Now TV (the second time the name was used), which shows a mix of products from around the world, including former TV Warehouse products. On 27 February 2009, JML extended its Freeview hours to 07:00 – 16:00 and was set to remain on Freeview until 11 May 2009.

On 2 March 2009, JML BeautyShop was renamed JML Lifestyle (the second time the name had been used) after becoming a simulcast service. On 24 March 2009, JML Home & DIY launched on Freesat channel 808. On 31 March 2009, Rocks & Co. ceased broadcasting its 5-hour Freeview block on channel 49 and on 1 April 2009, it was replaced with 5 hours of Gems TV, which took over the slot following the closure of Gems' previous 3 hour slot on channel 44. The JML/Rocks & Co. slot (Freeview EPG channel 49) was a shared frequency with Super Casino (EPG channel 48), and as such JML/R&C could not broadcast while Super Casino was on air. JML/Rocks & Co. had been due to be removed in May to make way for the launch of Quest, but when the launch of this channel was delayed by Discovery Networks UK, Rocks & Co. regained the slot on a temporary basis up until the launch of Quest. This arrangement saw UK Direct Shopping infomercials in the slot from 6am-8am, followed by Rocks & Co. content from 8am to midnight and then the Super Casino broadcast feed thereafter. This continued until the launch of Quest.

As of April 2009, JML have launched an interactive shopping service which is available through the Miniweb-owned TV Keys interactive platform within Sky's interactive menu. To access the service, viewers have to go to the Interactive menu on their on-screen guide, follow the link to the TV Keys launch page and enter JML's TV Key (565 – the equivalent of the letters "JML" on an alphanumeric keypad). This service is promoted by JML through on-screen graphics and short trailers aired on the JML channels. JML is not the only shopping channel to operate an interactive service; QVC UK operates QVC Active, which can be launched by pressing the red button while watching QVC; and the defunct Simply Shopping had an interactive service for a time.

=== Other additions and removals ===
Summer 2009 saw Rocks & Co. take over the 12am-2am slot on CNN International's Freeview channel (EPG 84) which had previously been leased to SuperCasino. This meant that until the launch of Quest, the full live airtime of R&C was available on Freeview. The move only covered the Freeview slot and did not affect CNN carriage on satellite and cable, which continued to air CNN content in this slot.

In August 2009, Pitch TV owners Pitchwell Group fell into administration, and their channels were temporarily leased out to JML until a buyer could be found. Pitch TV (Sky 646) began simulcasting JML Cookshop (also on 667) whilst Pitch World (656) began simulcasting JML Choice (662).

In September 2009, a further new channel was launched, replacing the simulcast channel JML Choice. JML Active took over channel 662 with a selection of sports, leisure and health products. On 30 September 2009, Pitch TV and Pitch World ceased simulcasting JML programming after finding a new buyer. On the same day, due to the launch of Quest, Rocks & Co. moved as part of a nationwide general Freeview retune. The broadcast moved from the shared slot with SuperCasino (multiplex A) and took up a previously unused 1pm-6pm slot on multiplex D which it shares with Russia Today, Create and Craft and Big Deal. The R&C EPG channel number also moved from 49 to 40. The 12am-2am slot on channel 84 (CNN) ceased broadcast in conjunction with the reduced broadcasting hours of Rocks & Co.

In December 2009, Shop Now TV was renamed JML Choice (the second time this name was used), while JML TV reverted back to JML Direct. Rocks & Co. also announced that they would not renew their contract with JML to continue operating their channel, and that they would plan to leave the platform.

On 1 February 2010, Rocks & Co. secured a permanent slot to continue operating on Channel 666. On the same day, JML Cookshop +, a simulcast service, was launched. On 12 April 2010, JML Direct was added to channel 201 on Channel M's local multiplex in Manchester on Freeview, but was removed on 13 October 2010.

On 16 June 2010, JML Home & DIY moved to channel 810, with JML Direct moving to channel 808 and JML Cookshop moving to channel 809. JML Home & DIY was removed on 5 July 2010.

In July 2010, JML Active and JML Choice's EPG slots were sold off, with JML Cookshop + being renamed as JML Choice, reverting JML back to a five-channel service. This was downgraded further to four networks when JML Lifestyle's slot was sold in September 2010.

==== Later history ====
On 18 May 2011, JML Cookshop was removed from Freesat and replaced with JML Choice.

On 15 June 2011, the JML networks were downgraded to three when Argos TV took over JML Cookshop's Sky EPG slot, with JML Cookshop moving further down the EPG, replacing JML Choice. Argos leased the Sky EPG slot from JML for 12 months to trial the channel and also use JML's facilities.

On 14 November 2011, JML and ITV plc launched a joint-venture network called The Zone on Freeview channel 39, but was not available in Wales until 9 January 2012. On 27 April 2012, The Store with JML launched on ITV. Dubbed a "chatmercial", it combined the visual language and style of a chat show format with TV home shopping and was shot in front of a studio audience. It broadcast across ITV's late night two-hour retail teleshopping schedule on Sundays, and overnight on ITV4. It was a presenter-led show featuring interactions from a panel of experts. It was split up into bite-sized chunks which focused on one product every 15 minutes. The shows included products from cookware to shapewear, DIY lines and celebrity brands such as Myleene Klass Nails.

On 3 November 2012, JML Home & DIY was rebranded as JML Living. On 28 November 2012, JML Living replaced JML Cookshop on Freesat. On 18 January 2013, JML Cookshop's Sky slot was sold altogether, ending the broadcast of the network.

On 1 May 2013, JML Living was replaced by The Boutique, a shopping channel managed by The Broadcast House but still owned by JML. JML Living returned on 13 May as a replacement for Argos TV on Sky after its lease from JML expired.

On 1 October 2013, The Zone was rebranded as The Store, replacing JML Living on Sky, broadcasting 24 hours a day, and between 6pm and 6am on Freeview. The slots on all platforms, except Freeview reverted to JML, and renamed as JML Store on 1 August 2014. The slot on Freeview remained named as "The Store", with Jackpot 247 broadcasting every night, followed by Teleshopping.

The Boutique was renamed as Home Store on 1 August 2014. On 19 August 2014, another complete EPG reshuffle of the 'Shopping' section on Sky happened as the majority of channels were shifted down 10 EPG slots. As a result, the JML channels moved to 651, 652 and 663.

On 1 May 2018, another complete EPG reshuffle of the 'Shopping' section on Sky happened as the majority of channels were shifted down 10 more EPG slots. As a result, the JML channel moved to 661, where it has remained since then.

The Store was eventually removed from the Freeview platform in January 2019, marking the end of the channel.

== See also ==
- TV Warehouse
- Screenshop
