= IBuy =

British home shopping channel

iBuy

Ownership
- Owner: IAC/HSN

History
- Launched: 18 April 2005; 21 years ago
- Closed: May 2007; 19 years ago

iBuy was a British satellite-based home shopping channel.

Created & launched on 18 April 2005 by Andy Sheldon, iBuy initially launched from the ex-AuctionWorld.tv studio at Teddington Studios, but relocated to Studio 1, at Hogarth Business Park in Chiswick, London.

iBuy operated as a falling price auction channel, similar to that of the 'original' auction shopping channel idea used by bid TV, price-drop TV.

The channel aired between 9:00am and midnight seven days a week on Sky, channel 631.

Towards the end of 2006, the channel also broadcast between 9:00am and midday on Five US to cater for the Freeview market.

Viewers placed bids in 'Freefall' auctions by calling a premium-rate number on screen, or by logging onto the website, www.ibuy.tv. The price of the item fell until all the quantity was sold. The price was dropped in larger units called a “Price plunge”. When stock was limited, “Stock Warning” was displayed on screen to introduce the closing stages of the auction. To further increase tension “Critical Stock” was sometimes displayed on screen when the final few items were left. All buyers paid the lowest price displayed on the screen at the end of the auction, as well as postage costs.

Sister channel ‘iBuy2’ launched later, and broadcast seven days a week on Sky channel 632. It also broadcast live falling price auctions, but from a separate studio which was formally home of the defunct HSN owned quiz channel ‘Quiz TV’. Before the channel ended on 18 February 2007, the sales used a ‘fixed-price’ format.

’iBuy Choice” featured pre-recorded ‘fixed-price’ sales during the live shows off-air hours. This format was replaced by ‘iBuy Unique’ which operated on a ‘lowest unique bid’ auction concept.

iBuy also featured on the BBC Three Welcome To My World documentary "Porno, Preachers and Peadlers" in 2006 alongside other channels: Television X, Girl Fever and Revelation TV.

== Closure ==
On 18 March 2007, main presenter Adam Freeman, revealed that it was to be his final shift and he was moving over to parent company HSN for employment in the USA.

On 27 March 2007, it was officially announced on the iBuy website that the channel had ceased live broadcasting.

The possible reasons for the channel's closure were cited to be connected to financial difficulties at the channel, due to their failure to successfully break into a market already dominated by shopping channels such as QVC UK, The sit-up Ltd channels (bid TV, price-drop TV, speed auction TV), Ideal World and Gems TV.

== Criticism ==
=== Possible links to Auction World.tv ===
iBuy was launched shortly after the collapse of Auction World.tv, and features many Auction World similarities namely in channel ideas, products, contacts and employees.

- Andy Sheldon: Head of Production at AW - now involved at iBuy, as the Head of Broadcasting. And has recently been promoted to Senior Vice President of Broadcasting, at the parent company HSN in the USA.
- Tim Cochran: Company Director at AW - now involved at iBuy
- Sandy Sandcaster: Operations Director and George Spitaliotis' business partner at AW - now involved at iBuy
- Simon Stedman: Customer Services manager at AW - now involved at iBuy

iBuy also launched with most of the production, and floor staff from Auction World, as well as initially using AW's Studio, Production Office & Warehouse at Teddington.

However, although iBuy is primarily run on a daily basis in the UK, by the ex-workforce of Auction World.tv, iBuy is not from the same company that created Auction World.tv. It is financed and owned by US Home Shopping Company HSN, whose parent company are competitors with the QVC network in the USA.

The Auction World.tv links have stemmed from the channel being set up by Andy Sheldon and Adam Freeman, both long-term friends and ex-Auction World employees. Who after the collapse of Auction World, found new monetary backers, and decided to create iBuy and in doing so, used the redundant auction-world.tv employees, products, channel contacts and studio equipment.

=== Dropped by NTL ===
On 28 August 2006 Britain's biggest digital cable outlet NTL made the decision to drop the iBuy channel from its platform. Prior to termination, iBuy complained to UK regulators that NTL, which owns competitor sit-up Limited, owner of channels bid TV, price-drop TV and speed auction TV, was abusing its dominant position in the cable market. Both the UK Office of Fair Trading and Ofcom declined to take any action due to a ‘lack of resources’ and 'unproven accusations' made by iBuy.

It has also been suggested on a number of media websites, that NTL decided to drop the iBuy shopping channel from its cable platform, due to financial problems at the HSN financed iBuy, although these allegations are unproven.

=== Connections to Ideal World and OneTV ===
In early October 2006, presenter Debbie Flint appeared on the iBuy shopping channel, as a 'guest' host. The same presenter who was directly involved with Paul Lavers & Steve Whatley to create, and present on the British shopping channel Ideal World.

Flint and Lavers would later join-up with mutual friend Paul Price, to present on the British shopping channel OneTV. Paul Lavers presented for only a short time on OneTV, before he later joined iBuy (again, only for a few months) in 2005. Debbie Flint although continued to present, and be involved with OneTV, right up until the major problems reared their head which eventually forced the channel to close in disgrace.

OneTV had its broadcast licence revoked by Ofcom, after it failed to pay its fee. The OneTV channel had previously been under investigation from the Advertising Standards Authority (ASA) after a number of viewers complained that orders had not been fulfilled, and refunds equalling to thousands of pounds had not been returned.

== Presenters ==
- Adam Freeman
- Darren Simons
- John Hammond
- Craig Rowe
- Alex Knowles
- Mike Mason
- Mark Stuart
- Paul Lavers
- Greg Scott
- Elisa Portelli
- Gemma Scott
- Caroline Artus
- Victoria Showers
- Fayon Cottrell
- Anoushka Williams
- Genevieve Mullen
- Georgina Burnett
- Zilpah Hartley
- Polly Parsons
- Laura Hamilton
- Debbie Flint
- Roshanth Gardiarachchi
