= Telewest =

British cable and telecommunications company

- Trade name: Telewest and Blueyonder
- Type: Public company
- Industry: Communications
- Founded: 1984
- Defunct: February 2007
- Fate: Merged with NTL & rebranded as NTL:Telewest
- Successor: Virgin Media
- Headquarters: United Kingdom
- Products: Cable television Broadband; Telephone; Mobile phone
- Website: http://www.telewest.co.uk (archive)

Telewest (previously Telewest Broadband and Telewest Communications) was a cable internet, broadband internet, telephone supplier and cable television provider in the United Kingdom. It was listed on the London Stock Exchange, and was also once a constituent of the FTSE 100 Index.

In March 2006, Telewest merged with fellow cable telecom company NTL, and created "NTL:Telewest", which then also merged with Virgin Mobile and Virgin.net in June 2006, creating the United Kingdom's first "quadruple play" telecom provider, offering television, internet, landline phone and mobile phone services. In February 2007, NTL:Telewest was rebranded as Virgin Media.

== History ==
Telewest originated in Croydon in 1984 under the name "Croydon Cable". United Cable, of Denver, acquired Croydon Cable in 1988. Franchises extended the company scope into Edinburgh and the southwest and southeast of England. In 1989, United Cable merged with United Artists Cable International.

In May 1991, United Artists announced a merged deal with its largest shareholder Tele-Communications Inc. (TCI), to form the largest cable operator in the United States; the deal was valued at $142.5m, and by June the deal was improved. The deal was finalised a week later on 8 June 1991, with TCI acquiring the remaining 46% of United Artists, to allow full control.

TCI and US West announced a joint venture, and in 1992, the joint venture company became Telewest Communications, a combination of the names of both founding companies. In June 1995, Telewest merged with SBC CableComms, adding franchises in the Midlands and North West serving 1.3 million homes. During this time Telewest founded a consortium called Cable Internet. This consisted of the major cable companies in the United Kingdom working together to provide a national Internet access service.

In March 1998, Telewest announced a merger with General Cable, and acquired the outstanding interest in Birmingham Cable, adding a further 1.7 million franchise homes in Yorkshire, west London and Birmingham. Telewest purchased the remaining 50% stake in Cable London from NTL in August 1999, adding 0.4 million franchise homes in North London.

Telewest merged with Flextech in April 2000, and in November, extended its cable network with the acquisition of Eurobell, taking the total number of homes passed to 4.9 million. The company later became known as "Telewest Broadband" in a rebrand during 2001. Telewest experienced financial difficulties in subsequent years, owing to the debts incurred as a result of constructing its cable network and acquiring other cable companies and assets. Notably, the Eurobell acquisition had been funded by an equity based deal, with a cash option; the poor performance of the company's stock meant that the cash option was favourable, and the company was not able to cover the call.

In September 2003, Telewest restructured itself, by swapping its unsecured debt for 98.5% of its shares. The London Stock Exchange then delisted the consolidated shares. Major Telewest shareholders included Huff and Liberty Media (run by cable tycoon John Malone).

=== Takeover by NTL ===
Logo of the NTL:Telewest.

The takeover of Telewest by NTL – a company of similar size, operating in different parts of the UK – was announced in October 2005, at a reported cost of $6bn. At that time, Telewest had 8,400 staff in the UK. The combined company at first used the name NTL:Telewest, then changed its name to Virgin Media in 2007, following the acquisition of Virgin Mobile the previous year.

=== Nickelodeon dispute ===
In late 2004, negotiations for renewed carriage of the Nickelodeon channels (Nickelodeon, Nick Jr. and Nicktoons) broke down; Telewest was unwilling to pay extra to keep the channels and preferred to drop them. Other Viacom-owned channels remained, such as MTV and, the now former, Paramount Comedy 1.

The reaction to this by customers was fairly large and many left the provider to rival Sky, with Nickelodeon even encouraging the move. Other customers were retained by Telewest offering them a free upgrade to the Disney Channel for periods of between one and three months, while others were reportedly offered upgrades to Sky Movies packages in an attempt to keep them from leaving. The Nickelodeon channels returned to the Telewest platform on 12 February 2005 following successful renegotiation in Nickelodeon's favour.

== Marketing strategies ==
Telewest used a number of marketing strategies over the years, with a solid corporate identity not coming out until the end of 2005, to coincide with a "three for £30" offer. Until 2007, the company used the mascot Ellie West to promote its services. In November 2004, when The Incredibles was released, Telewest promoted Blueyonder internet services with branding from the film, including television adverts starring characters from the film.

== Operations ==
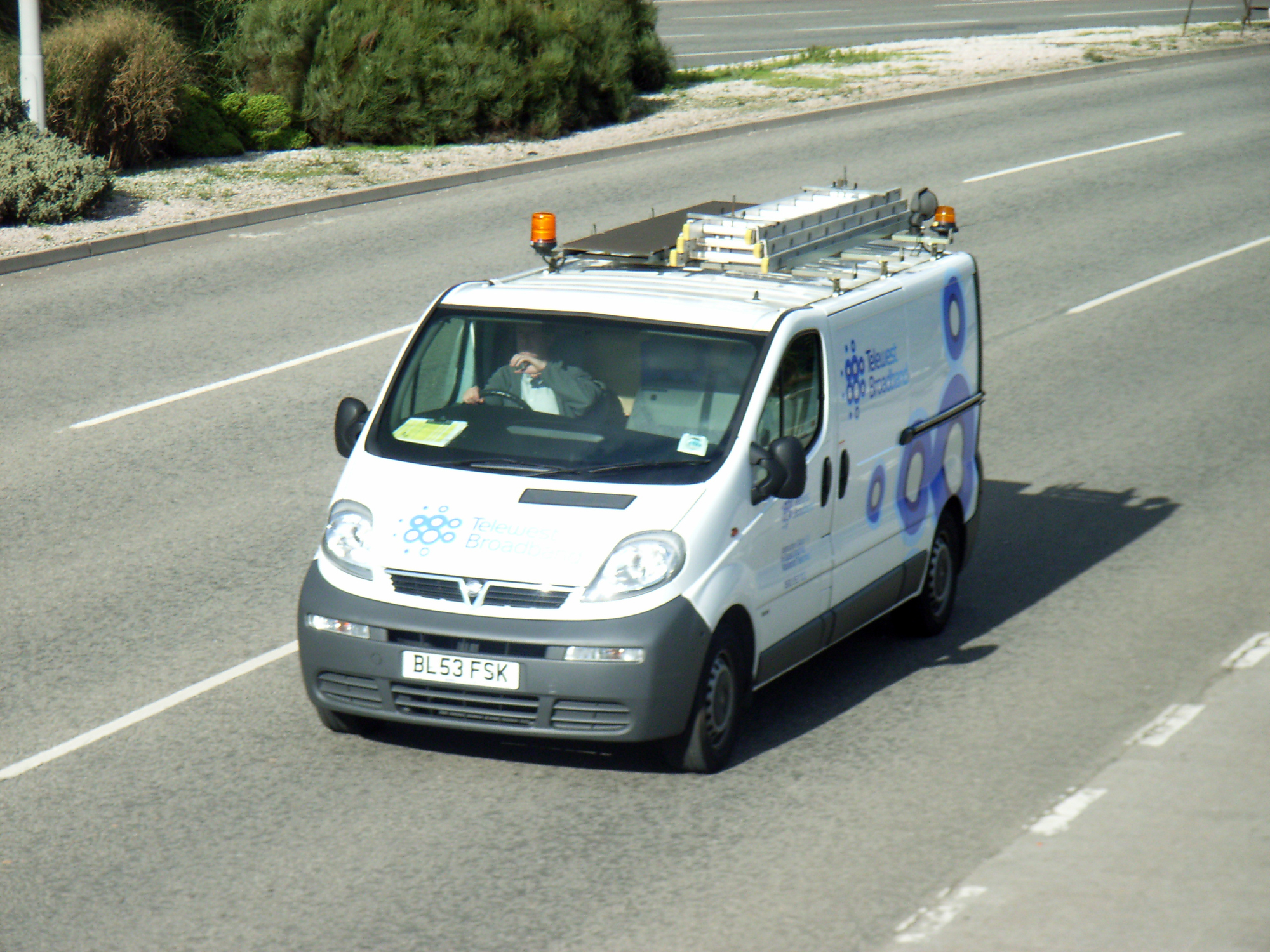
A Telewest Vauxhall Vivaro van in Plymouth, Devon (2006)

Telewest provided several residential services on its cable network, including:

=== Television ===
The majority of Telewest's television was digital. There were, however, areas that received an analogue service (Slough, Windsor and some areas in west London). Late in its independent existence, Telewest was in the process of converting the remaining analogue areas to digital, and it was expected that the analogue service would cease in 2007.

The digital television service offered a number of different products including true video on demand, a PVR, and HDTV.

- On Demand (formerly known as Teleport) was the brand name for Telewest's video on demand (VOD) service. The on Demand service launched in 2005. In contrast to Sky Digital which, due to technical limitations, was able only to provide near VOD services, Teleport was a true VOD system. Users could search through a large library of programmes and watch them when they wanted to as part of their subscription.

This library included a free seven day watch again feature for television programmes produced by the BBC, Channel 4 and Virgin Media Television (formerly known as Flextech). On Demand also offered movies that could be purchased and watched as many times as desired within a twenty four hour period. On Demand also offered HD content that worked in conjunction with the Telewest PVR (now renamed the V+).

- HDTV Telewest was the first United Kingdom broadcaster to offer HDTV. Telewest's HDTV service launched several months earlier than that of their chief competitor, Sky Digital.

Telewest's HD service initially comprised around 10–30 hours per week of video on demand content, with no linear high definition television channels available, although the early trial services of BBC HD and ITV HD were carried for a brief time. In January 2006, Telewest started to broadcast HD documentaries such as The Blue Planet, Planet Earth and Pride through their Teleport service, and later broadcast some movies in HD.

Telewest had an agreement with both ITV and the BBC, and claimed to be the only provider in the United Kingdom to offer all the 2006 FIFA World Cup matches in HD. In reality, however, half of the final group stage matches were not available in HD. Telewest's HD service was provided exclusively through their TV Drive box. Sky launched their HD service in May 2006, initially charging a £300 setup fee and an additional £10/month for several subscription HD channels, including HD versions of Sky One, Sky Movies and Sky Sports. Telewest charged a £75 setup fee and £10/month, although no subscription HD channels were offered. Telewest's fees however included the TV Drive recording service, equivalent to the recording features of the Sky+ service.

- TV Drive was the name of Telewest's Digital video recorder (PVR) service. The product incorporated a 160 gigabyte hard drive as standard, meaning it was able to store around 80 hours of recorded programmes. This was in contrast to BSkyB's Sky+ service which offered only 80 gigabytes (40 hours). Similarly, Telewest's product incorporated three tuners while Sky's incorporated only two, meaning that Telewest's service could record two channels at the same time while watching a third. A few days ahead of the rebranding to Virgin Media, TV Drive was renamed V+.

=== Internet ===
Telewest's internet service called Blueyonder, launched in March 2000 at a cost of £50/month for 512 Kbit/s service, by August 2000 the price was reduced to £33/month in an effort to compete with BT’s £40/month ADSL service. It used the cable infrastructure and was later expanded to offer speeds of 2 Mbit/s, 4 Mbit/s and 10 Mbit/s downstream. The broadband service was 'uncapped', meaning that its use was unlimited and no extra charges were payable related to the amount of data downloaded. The offering included free webspace where customers could create their own websites, which was discontinued for new customers after the rebranding to Virgin Media.

In November 2006, after the merger with NTL, The Register reported that subscriber traffic management was being trialled in areas of northern England, and would be rolled out nationwide. Blueyonder also provided dial-up internet services on a pay-as-you-go tariff, or a fixed monthly fee of £14.99 for unlimited use.

=== Telephone ===
- Talk Unlimited
- Talk Evenings and Weekends
- Talk Weekends

Provided landline calls for up to an hour for a fixed fee monthly inclusive of line rental. Telewest were the first landline company in the United Kingdom to offer 'unlimited' calls to landlines for a fixed monthly fee.

- Talk Mobile

Mobile calls with 25% reduction from standard rates.

- Talk International

Similar principle to Talk Mobile, with different reductions to different countries.

- Talk Anywhere

Packages including 200, 400, or 800 minutes of usage per month. Telewest were the first landline company to offer a package of this kind which included bundled minutes every month that could be carried over to the next. It included calls to mobiles, landlines (01 and 02; latterly also 03), businesses with 0845 and 0870 numbers, and specified international mobiles and landlines. It was available nationally, varying in price depending on the number of minutes.

== Broadcasting ==
Telewest owned Flextech, a content-provider with a number of wholly owned channels (including Bravo and LIVINGtv). Additionally, Flextech had a 50% share in UKTV (with BBC Worldwide), and owned Sit-Up Ltd, who operated Screenshop, bid TV, price-drop TV and Speed Auction TV.
