= EeZee tv =

British shopping channel

eeZee tv
- Country: United Kingdom; Ireland
- Headquarters: London

Programming
- Picture format: 576i (SDTV 4:3)

Ownership
- Owner: eeZee tv Limited

History
- Launched: 1 March 2005; 20 years ago 17 March 2007; 18 years ago (second launch)
- Replaced: JML Direct
- Closed: 3 March 2007; 18 years ago 22 December 2011; 13 years ago (second closure)
- Replaced by: JML Direct TV

Links
- Website: www.eezeetv.com

eeZee tv was a live British shopping channel broadcasting on Sky Digital. The channel launched on 1 March 2005.

== History ==
In September 2004, it was first announced that JML and Kleeneze were going to team up and launch a new channel, under the name of eeZee tv, which was going to replace JML's own channel.

At 10:00 on 1 March 2005, eeZee tv officially launched, showing a mix of JML and Kleeneze products ranging from Homewares to Beauty, for 16 hours a day. During the remaining hours it was off air, it showed pre-recorded material. The channel used a fixed price format, which was similar to other UK shopping channels, such as QVC and Ideal World.

On Friday 25 November 2005, eeZee tv ceased live broadcast and reverted to pre-recorded material.

In March 2007, after the removal of live broadcasting and lack of sales. Kleeneze finally pulled out and eeZee tv was no more. JML regained the EPG slot again and rebranded it back under the JML name to JML Direct TV on 3 March 2007. Since then, it has continued to show various JML products using ex-eeZee tv presenters and studios for pre-recorded JML infomercials.

== See also ==
- JML Direct TV
- Kleeneze
