= Norton Finance =

Norton Finance Group Ltd is a family owned, independent, finance broker based in Rotherham, United Kingdom. The company was founded by Keith Stringer in 1974. The company is both a broker and a lender. The company employs around 250 people.

== History ==
In 2002, Norton Finance were one of the more successful providers of secured loans in the UK when the market saw a 37% increase in sales. In 2003 Norton Finance fell victim to a computer hack prank that sent emails to a number of their contacts. In February 2012 Norton Finance (UK), which is part of the Norton Finance Group Ltd, entered administration. The larger Norton Finance Group Ltd continues to trade profitably. In May 2012 Norton Finance helped launch the 1925 Club at Rotherham United F.C.'s New York Stadium.

== Television Advertisements ==
Norton Finance is well known for its daytime television advertising in the UK. Television personality Caroline Lindsay (Price Drop, Ideal World, Gems TV (UK)) is the current presenter.

== Awards ==
- My Introducer Awards, Best Secured Loan Lender 2011
- Blemain Awards, Outstanding Contribution 2011
