= Andy Hodgson =

English television presenter and teleshopping auctioneer

- Born: Andrew Simon Hodgson; 2 March 1972 (age 54)
- Occupations: Television presenter and teleshopping auctioneer
- Years active: 2000-present
- Known for: bid tv; Ideal World; TJC

Andrew Simon Hodgson (born 2 March 1972) is an English television presenter and teleshopping auctioneer. He began his auctioneering career as the main host of bid tv from 2000 to 2010, and has since been a presenter on TJC since 2020.

Hodgson has also made other television appearances on shows such as This Morning, and has been heard on Fix Radio. He also provided the voice-over for the majority of the advertising for bid.tv, as well as appearing in-vision for several of them, as well as being a presenter on the late night TV gambling programme Win Cash Live.

== Auctioneering career ==
=== Bid TV ===
From 2000 to 2010, Hodgson presented bid tv on Sunday between 3.00 pm and 6.30 pm, as well as being a stand-in presenter at other times of the week. He presented on the channel since its inception in the year 2000. He also provided the voice-over for the majority of their advertising, as well as appearing in-vision for several of them.

Hodgson's sales technique differed to the other styles of his fellow presenters. He often joked with the production staff and assistants whilst presenting. One such assistant was the unseen warehouse assistant called "Bob the Warehouse". He once had a short term on-air relationship with "Jenoir from the Valleys"

When bidders phoned the channel to bid for an item, Hodgson's voice greeted them with a pre-recorded message detailing the item they were purchasing. Behind the scenes, he was also the Controller of Channels.

Hodgson announced in 2010, after a decade at the channel, that he would be leaving his permanent role as Controller of Channels and TV Revenue.

=== TJC ===
Since 2020, Hodgson has presented on shopping channel TJC.

== Other television appearances ==
Hodgson provided a running commentary over an episode of The Day Today on the DVD of the series. Writer and Alan Partridge co-creator Armando Iannucci (of The Friday Night Armistice fame) hired Hodgson to play a brutally murdered interior designer in his BBC Three show 2004: The Stupid Version as well as a Home Shopping TV presenter in his 2006 BBC Two production Time Trumpet. In 2003 he appeared on Channel 4 reality show The Salon to conduct a charity auction.

Additionally, Hodgson made multiple appearances on ITV1's daytime programme This Morning as a gadget expert. Hodgson regularly hosted live features with Phillip Schofield, Fern Britton, Eammon Homes and Ruth Langsford.

In 2015 Hodgson presented Win Cash Live, an interactive gambling programme shown on STV.

In 2016 Hodgson appeared as a presenter on Create and Craft USA broadcasting across America. He also appeared on Channel 5 as a reporter for The Championship show, London Live as a football journalist, and FanTV with Justin Lee Collins.

== Radio ==
Hodgson has been heard on BBC Radio 5 Live, BBC Radio 4, Talksport, BBC Radio Scotland, BBC Radio York, Century Radio, Star FM and LBC, and currently presents on Fix Radio with The Friday Sports Kick Off.

== Personal life ==
Although born in Salford, Hodgson is an ardent supporter of Burnley F.C., having grown up in Burnley, Lancashire. He has hosted numerous events at the club's Turf Moor ground.

== Filmography ==
- TJC - 2020 - present (Presenter)
- The Apprentice - Shopping Channel Expert
- The Big Audition (ITV) - Judge
- Ideal World - Presenter
- When Live TV Goes Horribly Wrong - Talking Head
- Football on 5 - Reporter
- Create and Craft USA - Presenter
- London Live - Football Expert
- Win Cash Live - Presenter
- Home & Garden Plus - Director and Presenter
- This Morning - Expert
- Richard Hammond's Secret Service - Actor
- bid up tv/bid tv - Controller of Channels for Sit-Up Ltd, Lead Presenter
- Time Trumpet - Actor (Shopping Channel Presenter)
- 2004: The Stupid Version - Actor
- RI:SE - Actor (sketch)
- Sky Sports News - Presenter
- The Day Today (DVD) - Special Commentary

== Radio Presenting ==
- Fix Radio
- BBC Radio Sussex
- 96.4 The Eagle
- LBC
- BBC Radio Scotland
- BBC North (Networked presenter)
- BBC Radio Cleveland
- BBC Radio York
