= Screenshop =

Ownership
- Owner: Bid Shopping

History
- Launched: October 1997
- Closed: 29 April 2012

Links
- Website: screenshop.co.uk at the Wayback Machine (archived August 22, 2006)

Screenshop was a British strand of infomercial-based shopping programming and television channel, owned by Bid Shopping.

== History ==
Screenshop was initially launched in October 1997 by Flextech, used as a filler service within the downtime of their owned networks, with intentions to expand to a standalone 24-hour digital network by 1998. It was intended to be the UK equivalent to HSN Direct, where it would show products from across the world from third-party companies. By 1998-1999, Screenshop launched an online store. In August 1999, Flextech revealed a £14 million loss from the launch of Screenshop and TV Travel Shop.

In early December 1999, Flextech announced that they would merge with cable provider Telewest Communications to create a £10.5bn media giant, with the deal finalising by April 2000. On 8 September 2000, a full 24-hour Screenshop network was launched on Sky Digital following many delays.

On 6 March 2001, Telewest announced that they would sell Screenshop to Sit-Up TV, the owners of Bid-Up.TV, for £10 million in exchange for a 38% stake in Sit Up that was valued at a £14.8m cash injection. The sale would merge Screenshop into Bid-Up.TV's own operations. Following the sale, Screenshop began to broadcast on the station during its downtime.

On 29 August 2002, a second Screenshop channel, entitled Screenshop 2, was launched on Sky Digital.

In July 2004, Sit Up signed a four-year deal with Vector Direct to allow Vector to exclusively supply Screenshop's programming, as well as during the downtime on Bid Up and Price Drop. The deal was valued at £5 million. After the deal closed, Screenshop lost its identity with all products shown on the channel being those from Vector Direct. Screenshop's website closed at the same time and became a redirect to Vector Direct's online store.

Beginning in November 2005, Screenshop began being supplied by TV Network under their TV Warehouse brand, with Screenshop's website transitioning into a redirect over to them. This was following Vector Direct's appearance on the BBC's Watchdog programme, which was due to the company charging unknowing customers £99.00 for entrance into a "Travel and Leisure" club, in which entry was automatic with every purchase. At some point, both Screenshop channels were removed from the Sky EPG, leaving them solely as filler on Sit-Up's other channels.

On 3 March 2008, Screenshop 2 relaunched on Sky channel 680, using the downtime of Speed Auction. The channel showed various items from 1.30am to 7.30am every night. Screenshop 2 closed on 29 April 2012.

== See also ==
- TV Warehouse
