= Vaibhav Global =

Indian retailer of jewellery and lifestyle products

Vaibhav Global Limited
- Type: Public
- Traded as: BSE: 532156; NSE: VAIBHAVGBL
- Industry: Retail
- Founded: 1980
- Founder: Sunil Agrawal
- Headquarters: Jaipur, Rajasthan, India
- Area served: United States, United Kingdom, Germany, Austria
- Key people: Sunil Agrawal (Managing Director)
- Products: Jewellery, gemstones, lifestyle products
- Brands: Rhapsody, Luxoro, Homesmart, LA Marey, Luxuriant, Rachel Galley, Strada, Genoa
- Revenue: ₹3,380 crore (US$403 million) (FY 2024–25)
- Operating income: ₹317 crore (US$38 million) (FY 2024–25)
- Net income: ₹153 crore (US$18 million) (FY 2024–25)
- Subsidiaries: Shop LC (US), TJC (UK), Ideal World (UK & Ireland), Shop LC DE (Germany), Mindful Souls
- Website: Official website

Vaibhav Global Limited (VGL) is an Indian company that operates television shopping channels and e-commerce platforms, primarily focused on jewellery, gemstones, and lifestyle products. The company is headquartered in Jaipur, Rajasthan, and runs retail operations in multiple international markets.

== History ==
The company began as a gemstone exporter in 1980 and was incorporated as Vaibhav Enterprises in 1989. It was listed on Indian stock exchanges in 1996. In the mid-2000s, the company expanded into television retailing in the United States and United Kingdom. Following the 2008 financial crisis, VGL restructured its operations with an emphasis on lower-cost consumer products and developed online retail alongside its television channels.

== Operations ==
VGL operates television shopping channels and e-commerce websites in the United States, the United Kingdom, Germany, and Austria. Its main platforms include Shop LC (US), TJC (UK), Ideal World (UK and Ireland), and Shop LC DE (Germany). In 2023, the company acquired the Mindful Souls platform, which offers lifestyle and wellness products.
