= Juwelo UK =

British home shopping TV channel

- Country: United Kingdom; Ireland

Programming
- Picture format: 576i (16:9, SDTV)

Ownership
- Owner: Rocks and Co. Productions Limited

History
- Launched: 6 September 2008
- Replaced: JML Lifestyle
- Closed: 13 March 2019
- Former names: Rocks & Co (2008-2018)

Links
- Website: www.rocksandco.com

Juwelo UK (formerly Rocks & Co) was a falling-price auction-style home shopping channel specialising in jewellery, the primary competitors to other shopping channels. The channel broadcast live from 08:00 to 23:00 daily on Sky channel 681, Freesat channel 814, Freeview channel 92 (02:00–05:00) and Freeview channel 271. The channel was renamed to Juwelo UK on 15 May 2018. It was closed on 13 March 2019.

== History ==
Rocks & Co launched on 8 September 2008 and shared some of its resources with JML Direct TV, which included one of its EPG slots to the company. It wasn't until 1 February 2010, when Rocks & Co acquired a permanent slot from JML Direct TV, which resulted in the channel moving from Sky channel 642 to 666.

The channels format initially was only fixed priced auctions and was heavily marketed as using 'no gimmicks'. However, a few months after the launch, this was changed to its current format due to its unpopular appeal and brought it in line with its main competitors; Gems TV and The Jewellery Channel. On 15 May 2018, Rocks and Co was renamed to Juwelo UK.

== Presenters ==
When first launched, Rocks & Co was fronted by some of the former Gems TV presenters, including Victoria Burton and Caroline Lyndsay. Since then, other former presenters have fronted the channel, including John Scott, Stacey Ellis and others.

John Scott returned to Rocks & Co. in November 2010.

== Relocation and restructuring of the company ==
In December 2009, as part of Rocks & Co's move to their new location in Leamington Spa, all staff were made redundant and all places were offered to staff who could move with the company. It was also announced that Rocks and Co were to leave the Sky platform.

Tony Diniz said:

It is our intention to leave the Sky platform all together. It is likely that this will happen soon. Over the past 4-6 months we have been building new studios, warehouse and call centre in Leamington Spa. The purpose of this is to improve the customer service experience for all of our customers as well as consolidating all of our business into a more efficient format.

As a consequence of this, the company will be moving and as part of UK regulations we have to make all staff redundant and offer the new positions to those that are interested in moving with us.

It is a sad moment for us as we know many of our staff are London based and will not be able to make the move with us. Also during this period of the move for the next 15-30 days we will be reducing our broadcasting hours.

However, as of 1 February 2010, Rocks & Co acquired a permanent slot on the Sky channel 666 after moving from channel 642.

== Criticism ==
In September 2009, the Advertising Standards Authority (United Kingdom) published a ruling which stated that Rocks & Co. had misled viewers over the value of a Patroke Kunzite ring. The starting price of the auction was given as £46,552 and the auction closed at £1,499, a sum which R&C told the ASA had resulted in selling the ring at a loss. During the auction, the presenter referred to various sub-£5000 prices as "a phenomenal, phenomenal, phenomenal price", "a joke" and "a giveaway price". The ASA upheld a viewer's complaint that these comments, coupled with the artificially high starting point of the auction, misled viewers as to the actual value of the item. R&C stated that their starting prices were not intended to imply a worth or valuation of the items for sale, and that based the current wholesale prices for kunzite stones, the firm estimated the actual worth of the ring to be in the region of £4,432, and that this justified some of the comments ("a joke", et al.) made about prices lower than this level. The ASA, however, ruled that viewers may have interpreted the starting price as "an amount materially related to the usual retail price or suggested valuation" of the item. They also ruled that R&C's failure to provide independent substantiation for the stone's value contributed to the sale having been misleading. The sale was thus ruled by the ASA to have been in breach of TV Advertising Standards Code rules on 'misleading advertising'.

== See also ==
- Rocks TV
