= Alex Lovell =

English television presenter, actress, newsreader and voice over artist

- Born: Alexandra Lovell; 28 March 1973 (age 53); Gravesend, Kent, England
- Education: Rose Bruford College
- Occupations: Actress, newsreader, voice-over artist and television presenter
- Employer: ITV West Country
- Known for: BrainTeaser; BBC Points West; Fun Song Factory; Playhouse Disney; Timmy Towers
- Website: alexlovell.com

Alexandra "Alex" Lovell (born 28 March 1973) is an English television presenter, actress, newsreader and voice-over artist who is employed by ITV West Country. Her previous roles include stage and television acting, and she presented or co-presented the regional news programme BBC Points West from 2005 until 2023.

== Early life ==
Lovell was born in Gravesend, Kent, grew up in Harrogate, North Yorkshire and attended Rose Bruford College, a drama school in London.

== Career ==
=== Live productions ===
Lovell began her career as a stage actress, in roles which included Linda in Blood Brothers at the Birmingham Repertory Theatre. In 1997, she joined the Playdays live tour where she puppeteered and voiced Why Bird.

Lovell has also appeared in pantomime on several occasions including in Cinderella at The New Theatre, Woking in 2002–2003.

=== Children's television ===
Lovell's first television role was as a presenter on the Fun Song Factory television series in 1998. She was later appointed as the female presenter for Disney Channel's Playhouse Disney strand with fellow-Fun Song Factory presenter Dave Benson Phillips which began in September 1999, and latterly, on the Playhouse Disney Channel, until most in-vision continuity was dropped by the network in late August 2006.

She also had roles in several other children's shows, portraying Miss Thing in the second series of CITV's Timmy Towers and appeared in one episode of the BBC One sitcom My Dad's the Prime Minister, as 'Saskia', a disc jockey.

=== 2000–2007 ===
Lovell's first television acting role outside children's television was as a presenter for Bid-up.tv within the channel's launch in October 2000. The following year, she was poached by rival shopping channel Auction World.tv and began presenting during the launch window as well. She later began presenting on Auction World's sister network Chase-it.tv until the channel's parent company went insolvent in November 2004 following a £450,000 fine by Ofcom.

For a time in 2002, Lovell presented the "iPlay" and "Game Central" strands on Challenge until they were both dropped at the end of the year.

In August 2002, Lovell's next move was presenting BrainTeaser on Five. Initially, she shared the presentation with a selection of other presenters, but from 2006 until the last show on 7 March 2007, she was the sole presenter except for occasional breaks. She was the only presenter on the show who lasted the entirety of the show's run-up to its axing in March 2007 after the 2007 British premium-rate phone-in scandal.

Lovell moved into regional news by joining the BBC Points West team in July 2005, becoming its lead female anchor. Until 2020, she normally co-presented alongside David Garmston until COVID-19 related cuts removed co-presenting roles, with Lovell then presenting alone.

With BrainTeaser being produced in Endemol's Bristol studios, Lovell also did a voice-over role for Channel 4's Deal or No Deal, which she continued until the viewers' competition was dropped in October 2007. She also did a narration role for Fool Around With.

=== 2007–present ===
After the cancellation of BrainTeaser, Lovell has mostly remained a local presenter. She has made one-off appearances on various television shows.

She appeared in one episode of ITV's The Bill, broadcast on 14 November 2007, playing a television news reporter, Lisa Spence.

In May 2008, she had a role in an episode of BBC1 sitcom Love Soup, playing an entertainment reporter at a red carpet event.

On 6 August 2011, Lovell starred in an episode of Bristol-made BBC programme Casualty as an on-scene television news reporter.

On 9 April 2019, she appeared on an episode of Lorraine to discuss her experience as a stalking victim.

On 31 October 2023, it was announced Lovell would leave Points West after 18 years and join ITV News West Country. She made her last appearance on 1 December 2023, and made her on-air debut on ITV News West Country on 2 January 2024.

==== Stalking ====
In January 2019, 69-year-old Gordon Hawthorn, a viewer of Points West, was jailed for his six-year stalking campaign against Lovell, following a police appeal. Lovell had suffered panic attacks as a result of receiving 'crude and very graphic' greetings cards at her workplace, sent by Hawthorn, beginning in 2013.

== Filmography ==
=== Television ===
| Year | Programme/Channel | Role | Notes |
|---|---|---|---|
| 1998 | Fun Song Factory | Presenter | 8 episodes |
| 1999-2006 | Playhouse Disney | Little Alex | Main role, with Dave Benson Phillips |
| 1999 | Timmy Towers | Miss Thing | Main role, Series 2 |
| 2000-2001 | Bid Up.tv | Presenter | |
| 2001-2004 | Auction World.tv | Presenter | Also presented on sister network Chase-it.tv |
| 2002 | Challenge? | Presenter | Presented the IPlay and Games Central strands |
| 2002-2007 | BrainTeaser | Presenter | Main presenter of the show, originally alternated with other presenters until 2006 |
| 2003 | The Wright Stuff | Guest | One episode |
| 2003 | My Dad's the Prime Minister | Saskia | One episode |
| 2005-2023 | BBC Points West | Presenter | Presented on most weekdays outside some half-term periods. Normally co-presented with David Garmston until 2020 |
| 2005-2007 | Deal or No Deal | Narrator | Narrated phone-in competition guidelines, uncredited |
| 2005-2006 | Fool Around With | Narrator | Series 1 |
| 2007 | The Bill | Lisa Spence | One episode |
| 2008 | Love Soup | Entertainment reporter | One episode |
| 2011 | Casualty | Unnamed news reporter | One episode |
| 2019 | Lorraine | Guest | One episode |
| 2024–present | ITV News West Country | Presenter | Co-presenter, normally with Sabet Choudhury |
