= Timmy Towers =

British children's television series

- Developed by: Brilliant TV
- Starring: Timmy Mallett; Sophie Lawrence; Mark Speight; Alex Lovell; Roger Bremble
- Country of origin: United Kingdom
- Original language: English
- No. of episodes: 17 (15 missing)

Production
- Running time: 20 minutes

Original release
- Network: ITV (CITV)
- Release: 21 February 1997 – 2 July 2000

Related
- SMart; Wacaday

Timmy Towers is a children's television series produced by Brilliant TV that was first shown in 1997. The programme starred Timmy Mallett as himself, Mark Speight as the Abominable No Man, and Roger Bremble as Aunty Knobbly Knees. The character Miss Thing was originally played by Sophie Lawrence, before Lawrence was replaced by Alex Lovell in the later series.

A pilot episode was broadcast on 21 February 1997. There was a summer special and a Christmas special in 1998. The programme was picked up for a full series of eight episodes in 2000.

Episodes often featured guest appearances, including by Rod Hull and Emu, Snug and Cozi, Lorraine Kelly, Stephen Mulhern and Michaela Strachan.
