= Timmy Mallett =

English television and radio presenter, artist

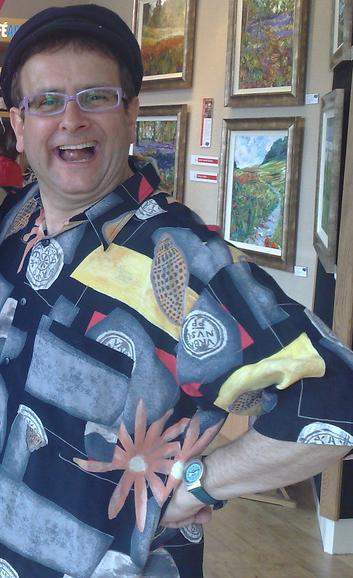
- Mallett in Market Harborough 2008
- Born: Timothy Luke Mallett; 18 October 1955 (age 70); Marple, Stockport, Cheshire, England
- Education: University of Warwick
- Occupations: Television presenter; broadcaster; author; artist
- Years active: 1982–present
- Spouse: Lynda Bingham (m. 1990)
- Children: 1
- Website: timmymallett.co.uk

Timmy Mallett (born 18 October 1955) is an English television presenter, broadcaster, author and artist. He is known for his striking visual style, colourful glasses and shirts, and a giant pink foam mallet (known as "Mallett's Mallet"), as well as his "utterly brilliant!" and "blaaah!" catchphrases.

== Career ==
=== Radio ===
Mallett was born in Marple, Cheshire. He attended Rose Hill Primary School in Marple, Earnseat Prep School in Arnside, and Hyde Grammar School.

His media career started while he was a student at the University of Warwick where he worked on the student radio station, Radio Warwick. After graduating with a degree in History, he started working at BBC Radio Oxford. He later moved to Centre Radio (now Capital Midlands) as the station's launch presenter. He also presented on Radio Luxembourg and Manchester's Piccadilly Radio.

In 1982 Timmy was also part of the "Stayin' Alive" team on BBC Radio 1

The programme he hosted at Piccadilly was Timmy on the Tranny, a weekday evening show that ran from 8.00pm–11.00pm and took its name from Mallett's lunchtime and later afternoon shows on Radio Oxford. Among Mallett's team of helpers were Chris Evans (known as 'Nobby Nolevel'), Andy Bird (who played the pirate radio character 'Radio Diggle') and Karen Walsh (the original 'Aunty Boney kneecaps'). This led to Mallett co-presenting the Manchester-based BBC2 youth music show Oxford Road Show for 1985 series .

Mallett won two Radio Academy Awards for Best Local Radio Presenter (1984) and Best Pop Music Show (1986).

=== Television ===
In 1983, Timmy joined TV-am, where he interviewed the musical act and bands of the day for the pop news strand, Timmy also presented Summer Run on Saturday mornings for the new breakfast television station. In Autumn 1984, he became a presenter of Wide Awake Club, a new Saturday morning children's programme on TV-am, with co-presenters Michaela Strachan, James Baker, Arabella Warner and Tommy Boyd. Future actor Mike Myers also had a minor role alongside Neil Mullarkey. TV-am found itself lacking a school holidays programme after Roland Rat moved to the BBC, and he was offered the chance to present it. The replacement, a spin-off of Wide Awake Club, was called Wacaday (based on the addition of 'aday' to the initials 'WAC' for Wide Awake Club) and began broadcasting in October 1985.

In the Wide Awake Club, contestants were hit over the head by his famed mallet for getting answers wrong. In later years, a talking mini-version of the mallet called "Pinky Punky" was introduced (the name chosen after Mallett asked viewers to write in with their ideas) and soon became one of Mallett's established sidekicks along with Magic, his pet cockatiel. Wacaday ended in 1992 when TV-am lost its franchise to broadcast.

Since then, Mallett has run his own production company, Brilliant TV.

In 1993, Mallett starred in The Children's Channel's Around the World in 80 seconds as Captain Everything.

From 1997 until 2000, he acted in Timmy Towers, for CITV.

=== Other ===
During 1983 until 1990 Mallett also co-presented numerous BBC School programmes included Radio series "Looking at Nature" and Radio Club. While on Television: Walrus. What Should I Do?, "Wondermaths", Logo Gogo Logo and Questions

In 2002, Mallett made West Ham United agree to stop selling copies of their mascot, Herbie the Hammer, in their club shop after he complained that it looked too similar to Pinky Punky. West Ham United withdrew the item.

In 2004, he was a stand-in contestant for the ITV1 jungle-based reality series I'm a Celebrity...Get Me Out of Here!. In 2008, he entered the show as a full contestant.

In 2008, Mallett appeared on Big Brother's Little Brother.

In September 2008, Mallett appeared on the BBC One politics show This Week talking about being positive when things get tough.

In November 2008, Mallett appeared in the eighth series of I'm a Celebrity...Get Me Out of Here!. He entered the show by being captured in an oversized net and imprisoned in jungle jail. The celebrities were given an option to trade their possessions for him and David Van Day to enter. They refused. On 30 November 2008, Mallett was the fourth contestant eliminated from the show after being placed in the bottom two in the public voting and taking part in a play-off bush tucker eating trial with Brian Paddick.

== Music ==
With producers Nigel Wright and Andrew Lloyd Webber, Mallett formed the band Bombalurina, named after a character in Lloyd Webber's musical Cats. Along with female vocalists and dancers Dawn Andrews and Annie Dunkley, they released a cover of the single "Itsy Bitsy Teeny Weeny Yellow Polka Dot Bikini". It reached number one in the UK Singles Chart in August 1990.

Follow up single "Seven Little Girls Sitting in the Backseat" reached number 18 in the UK in December 1990.

The Bombalurina album Huggin' And A Kissin' with 14 tracks was released in December 1990.

Ditching the Bombalurina name, but again working with producer Nigel Wright, Mallett released a cover of Kenny's "The Bump" under the name M.C. Mallett in 1991. This failed to chart.

For "Tommy's Campaign", Mallett recorded "The Laughing Policeman" with producer George Martin in 1991.

Under the name Del Costa, Mallett released a megamix version of "Hot Hot Hot" in summer 1992.

In 2008, Mallett featured in Skepta's video "Rolex Sweep" and accompanied Skepta to the MOBO nominations.

In 2013, Mallett recorded Gilbert O'Sullivan's hit "Ooh-Wakka-Doo-Wakka-Day".

Mallett's "Summer Holiday" video was made in 2014.

== Stage shows ==
Mallett has appeared in pantomime in Lewisham theatre, Cliffs Pavilion Southend, Hexagon Reading, Derngate Northampton, Arena St Albans, Wyvern Swindon, Forum Billingham, Pavilion Worthing, Grand Pavilion Porthcawl, Playhouse Weston-super-Mare and Theatre Royal Windsor.

In December 2016, he appeared in Jack and the Beanstalk at Theatre Royal Windsor.

While staying in Hartlepool, Mallett rescued a woman from the marina in December 2001.

He toured the Pontins holiday camps with the "Utterly Brilliant Timmy Mallett Show" in 2014.

He toured Park Holidays UK's sites doing The Timmy Mallett Show in 2016.

== Art ==
Mallett is an oil painter and acrylic and watercolour artist whose work sells in galleries across UK and Europe. His work is distributed and published in limited editions by De Montfort Fine Art and Buckingham Fine Art

In 2002, he painted 50 portraits for Queen Elizabeth II's Golden Jubilee including Wendy Craig, Jim Rosenthal, Lorraine Kelly, Ulrika Jonsson and Sir Clive Woodward.

In 2012, Mallett won the Best up and coming artist Fine Art Trade Guild.

In 2012, Mallett painted a telephone box in Windsor with likenesses of the Queen Elizabeth II, Prince Harry and Catherine the Duchess of Cambridge.

In the summer of 2018, Mallett discovered and painted his father's secret Galloway bridge scene from September 1966.

== Selected television programmes ==
- TV-AM (1983–1985)
- Oxford Road Show (1984)
- Wide Awake Club (1984–1989)
- Wacaday (1985–1992)
- Utterly Brilliant (1989–1991)
- Questions (1990) BBC Two education series
- Around the World in 80 Seconds (1993–1994)
- Way to Go (1996–1997)
- Timmy Towers (1997–2000)
- The Beeps (2007)
- I'm a Celebrity... Get Me out of Here! (2008 series)

== Sport ==
Mallett is a supporter of Oxford United and Maidenhead United.

Mallett is a long-distance cycling adventurer. In 2022, he completed a solo circumnavigation of the coast of Britain, following in the footsteps of painter J. M. W. Turner. There is an online map from the Ordnance Survey showing the route, paintings and videos around nearly 5000 miles of coastline.

He rode through Northern Ireland in May 2015, Lincolnshire in summer 2015 and through Cumbria in May 2016.

In spring 2018, Mallett cycled alone from home in England through France and Spain along the pilgrimage route, the Camino de Santiago to Santiago de Compostela Finisterre and back, a distance of over 4000 km, inspired by his older brother Martin with Downs syndrome. The story forms the basis for his memoirs Utterly Brilliant: My life's Journey, published in 2020 by SPCK, which also includes some of the paintings produced on this adventure.
