= Auction World.tv =

British television channel

History
- Launched: 1 November 2001
- Closed: 19 November 2004

Auction World.tv was a British television channel which auctioned a variety of products by telephone bidding.

The channel claimed to sell high-quality products at very low prices and promised reliable delivery, however doubt was cast over these claims after investigations reported by papers and television programmes such as the Daily Mirror and Watchdog. These reports led to an investigation by Ofcom who handed the company a £450,000 fine, forcing it under administration and out of business.

== History ==
Auction World.tv sold a variety of household and leisure products, using the television as the way of advertising to/engaging the viewing audience, selling apparently high-quality products with guide prices of up to £20,000.

An auctioneer presenter would describe the product, and then provide a guide price as to how much the item would sell for "on the high street", stating that the guide price was an average of a minimum of three high street retailer prices. There would be a defined number of units of the product available. Both this and the guide price were shown on the TV screen, together with a traffic-light clock normally set at three minutes - but could be stopped by the auctioneer/presenter.

The auction would then start, using a rising format - the price would rise from a minimum start price, normally well below the guide price - this is the auction price. Viewers would bid on the item at a price they choose, which needed to be above the auction price. The auction closes when the auctioneer presenter decides to close it.

Auction World was popular and apparently successful, and began expanding with further channels. AuctionWorld Reserve sold higher guide priced items, and Chase-it.tv used a similar presenter/guide price/clock format, but the price would rise and fall randomly between the guide price and a (supposedly) unknown lower figure. Viewers would therefore pay the price shown on the screen when they dialled, which was not as in the other formats guaranteed to be the price every other viewer paid. However, because of the time delay in transmitting and receiving the viewing signal at home; the channel was often many seconds behind the studio's "real" time. This often meant the price listed on-screen wouldn't necessarily be the price listed in the studio and led to many buyers ending up paying a (usually) higher price than they had expected to.

Auction World itself expanded, particularly selling gemstones in various formats - globes, as well as unset but finished diamonds. Most of these items were sold with a validation certificate.

== Downfall ==
Auction World.tv's downfall came about because of two reasons - the setting and validity of the guide price, and the ability to deliver items in a timely manner. The disappointment for buyers was the ineffectual ability of the regulatory authorities to either take action on complaints, or piece together the scale of the failure of the company to trade honestly or provide what they sold.

=== Guide price ===
The High Street locations where the guide price was taken from were never quoted, either during the auction or via any other format. Hence, the viewer was asked to believe Auction World's honesty in creating a guide price. However, buyers questioned this. One example quoted was that of a globe made of precious stones and metals: Auction World were selling this item for £1,280 with no official valuation certificate, whereas a very similar item (slightly larger and classified as being a higher quality) was given an official valuation and a guide price of £930 on bid-up.tv.

Towards the end of Auction World's operations, guide prices got so far "adjusted" that the auctioneer presenters questioned the guide price. Viewers began to question the validation of the guide price, which reduced sales and hence Auction World's cash flow.

=== Delivery ===
Delivery time scales were never excellent, but as sales began to fall the company's ability to pay fixed outgoings to channel distributors like BSkyB and NTL were limited, and so delivery time scales to buyers were increased to cover the shortfalls. This created a series of complaints from buyers to both regulatory bodies (i.e. - the ITC and Trading Standards), as well as consumer focused champions (i.e. - BBC Watchdog and the Daily Mirror).

=== Regulation ===
The ITC, which had previously made claims disputing the quality of Auction World, later merged with several other broadcasting regulators to form Ofcom. During this merger it seems previous claims were disregarded. Considered to be guilty of only minor offences at first, Auction World claimed they would improve their service. It was only once Ofcom had carried out its own investigation that punishments were handed out to the channel.

The investigation led to a variety of consequences:

- a prosecution by Hertfordshire Trading Standards
- a fine of £450,000
- Auction World was given a month to clear their products and pay £15m losses
- the company directors were banned from similar work for 18 months and were forced to surrender their other companies

=== Closure ===
Auction World.tv ceased broadcasting in November 2004, as did Auctionworld Reserve and Chase-it.tv. Barnes Trust Media, owners of Teddington Studios, were owed many thousands of pounds in back rent.

== Short-lived successor ==
In April 2005, falling-price auction channel iBuy was created, and launched by Andy Sheldon & Adam Freeman, continuing to 2007. The channel used the same management, production and floor team, products, contacts and channel layout that were almost identical to Auction World. Also, initially, iBuy's production offices & warehouse, were the very same ones at Teddington, in which were used by Auction World.

== Notable former presenters ==
- Alex Lovell
- Liz Fuller
