= Nana Akua =

British television presenter and journalist (born 1971)

- Born: Nana Akua Amoatemaa-Appiah; 19 July 1971 (age 55); Newcastle upon Tyne, England
- Education: University of Sunderland (BA)
- Occupations: Television presenter; journalist
- Known for: GB News

Nana Akua Amoatemaa-Appiah (born 19 July 1971) is a British television presenter and journalist working for GB News.

== Early life ==
Akua was born on 19 July 1971 in Newcastle upon Tyne, England. The daughter of Ghanaian immigrants, when her family moved to the United States when she was 11 years old she remained in the UK during term time at a girls' boarding school. Akua studied business and finance at university.

== Career ==
Akua has worked for Kiss 100, Capital Radio, the Chelsea and Westminster Hospital radio station and BBC Three Counties Radio.

On television, Akua worked as a presenter for Bid-Up.TV and Price Drop, later working for the BBC on Look East and Holiday. She also appeared as a panellist on Good Morning Britain on ITV and Jeremy Vine on Channel 5, as well as being a contributor to a Panorama programme on mortgage scammers. She later worked as a continuity announcer for the BBC. She presented Tonight Live with Nana Akua on GB News.

In December 2023, Akua was nominated for a Charles Gordon Trust Award for Best Presenter.

== Personal views ==
Akua worked with the Department of Health and Social Care to encourage black, Asian and minority ethnic (BAME) people to be vaccinated against COVID-19, and called GB News co-host Darren McCaffrey a "hypocrite" live on-air for opposing compulsory vaccinations against COVID-19 for staff in care homes.

Akua has criticised "taking the knee" against racism as an example of virtue signalling. Akua has linked it to Black Lives Matter (BLM), which she calls a "far-left Marxist pressure group and political organisation" and has supported England football fans who did not agree with the gesture of taking the knee, but said that booing is bad manners.
