= Snug and Cozi =

British children's comedy television series

- Snug and Cozi title card
- Starring: Richard Vobes; Nigel Cooper; Sarah Montgomery
- Country of origin: United Kingdom
- Original language: English
- No. of seasons: 2
- No. of episodes: 16

Production
- Running time: 8 minutes
- Production company: Scottish Television

Original release
- Network: ITV (CITV)
- Release: 1 November 1996 – 2 October 1997

Snug and Cozi is a children's slapstick comedy series that aired on the British television station ITV from 1 November 1996 to 2 October 1997. The series broadcast 13 episodes and was produced by Scottish Television Enterprises.

Martyn Day directed the first series and Haldane Duncan directed the second series.

== Format and premise ==
The show consists of 10-minute slapstick comedy style episodes for children's television. The principal characters Snug and Cozi are aliens from the planet Squidge. While travelling in deep space, their pink rocket is hit by an asteroid and knocked off course. They crash and land on Earth, where they are discovered by a girl named Emily, whom they befriend. She hides them in the garden shed at the bottom of her garden. Snug and Cozi speak a language called Squidge, which is gibberish to humans, but the occasional English word is recognisable.

== Creation and pilot episode ==
The idea for the show was created by actor and film maker Richard Vobes in 1994. With fellow actor Nigel Cooper, they produced a low budget pilot version of the show on 16mm film. The original concept explored the idea of aliens living in a potting shed on an allotment. When commissioned in 1996 by STV, the series was developed further to be included with a slight alteration in the name "cosy" to the spelling of Cozi in the title. The opening sequence was also modified but included some original animation footage of the rocket ship in the opening titles, depicting the scene of aliens crashing on the surface of Earth.

Vobes was never entirely satisfied with the TV series as he was not permitted to direct it, and many of the slapstick stunts in the scripts were either simulated or never executed. In an interview, he mentioned that the only stunt they were allowed to do was riding a bed down a hill and into a car wash (in the episode 'A New Home').

== Characters ==
- Snug, played by Richard Vobes, wears a yellow and silver spacesuit. Snug is more dim-witted than Cozi.
- Cozi, played by Nigel Cooper, wears a red and silver spacesuit and has a moustache. Cozi is more intelligent than Snug.
- Emily, played by Sarah Montgomery, is a 10-year-old girl who discovers Snug and Cozi after they had crashed on Earth. She decides to look after them and keep them away from other people by hiding them in her father's garden shed (series 1) or their summerhouse (series 2). Emily also takes Snug and Cozi on various trips, such as the seaside or her school sports day.

== Popularity ==
The show received a 32% audience share on CITV when Britain had only four terrestrial channels. Though not widely remembered, it's available to watch on YouTube. Two series of 16 episodes aired before changes ITV abruptly stopped the commission of a planned third series.

The Daily Record called the show a "big hit". The Times reported that alongside other shows, Snug and Cozi made Scottish Television's operating profit reach £3.3 million, a record number.

== Live shows and tours ==
Snug and Cozi made appearances on many other CITV programmes such as Wow in 1996, Scratchy & Co. in 1997 and Timmy Towers in 1998.

In 1998, Snug and Cozi appeared in a pantomime of Cinderella at the Doncaster Civic Theatre. Their roles were as Brokers Men. No one in the audience could really understand Squidge so Snug and Cozi ate dictionaries and suddenly were able to speak English.

Snug and Cozi also embarked on a Pink Caravan tour, performing shows across Britain in their pink caravan. However, there were not many gigs, and during one of the shows, the Rocket Car they used caught fire, leading the fire brigade to intervene and extinguish the flames.

== Merchandise ==
The show has never been released on VHS or DVD. A Snug and Cozi CD called 'Pink Heads' was released in 1997. To promote the CD Snug and Cozi travelled to London to give the prime minister a copy.

Richard Vobes is writing a series of Snug and Cozi children's books.

Snug and Cozi was included in a book called The Legends of Kids TV written by Garry Vaux, where Richard talked about his time on the show.

== Episode guide ==
=== Unbroadcast pilot (1994) ===
Title
"Snug and Cozi"
The Two aliens crash land on earth by accident after an asteroid hits their spaceship, they decide to adopt more Earth sounding names from a shop, 'Snug and Cozi', and taking over a man's potting shed, thinking it's a holiday home.

=== Series 1 (1996) ===
No. overall	No. in series	Title	Original release date
1	1	"The Yellow Dragon"	1 November 1996
Snug and Cozi unpack various items from their rocket ship. Snug discovers a remote control unit and manages to control Cozi. Cozi then stumbles into a yellow JCB in the garden next door. The two aliens mistake it for a monster.
2	2	"The Haunted House"	8 November 1996
When Snug and Cozi's football is accidentally kicked to an abandoned house, they are forced to retrieve it. The house turns out to be haunted.
3	3	"Bike Ride"	1996
Snug and Cozi run out of breakfast cereal and decide to buy some from the local supermarket. They set off on their bike - a tandem. Bobby, a local in the town, investigates their mischief.
4	4	"Helping Hand"	1996
Snug and Cozi discover a burglar in their friend's house and try to stop his stealing. The house becomes an adventure playground, resulting in cartoonish hijinks.
5	5	"Educated Aliens"	1996
Snug and Cozi visit Emily's school for the day. They attempt to do mathematics and make paper aeroplanes. They later get into a mudpie fight outside.
6	6	"Splash"	1996
Emily take Snug and Cozi to the local swimming baths. Snug and Cozi then play with fire hose, a lifeguard and a large pool of water.

=== Series 2 (1997) ===
No. overall	No. in series	Title	Original release date
7	1	"A New Home"	1997
Snug and Cozi hide in the removal van to Emily's new house. They discover a garden summer house and move in. Snug shows Cozi how much can be packed into a small suitcase.
8	2	"Feeling Parky"	1997
Cozi decides to mock illness and paints spots onto his face. Snug decides the only way to get him better is a stroll through the park, to the displeasure of the park keeper.
9	3	"Bath Time"	1997
Cozi decides it is time for him to take a bath and sends Snug out to get water. Snug brings in tap water and manages to fill the room with bubbles. Cozi disappears down the plug hole and Snug thinks of how to rescue him.
10	4	"Pink Letter Day"	1997
Cozi is writing a letter home to his parents. Snug tells him that they cannot use the normal postal system, instead, they need to get the letter high into the air.
11	5	"Magic Moments"	1997
Snug and Cozi visit a magic show in the local village hall. The magician asks for a volunteer, and they help.
12	6	"Beside The Sea"	1997
Emily takes Snug and Cozi to the seaside, where it is raining. They try to still have fun by watching a Punch and Judy show and building a large sand castle.
13	7	"A Slight Trim"	1997
Cozi's moustache grows to a large size and Snug has to take him to the barber's shop to trim it. Snug then takes the role of the barber.
14	8	"Sports Day"	1997
Snug and Cozi return to Emily's school for the sports day festivities. They take part in the three-legged race and egg and spoon race. The Head Teacher makes them leave, but they soon come back.
15	9	"Birthday Party"	1997
It is Emily's birthday and Snug and Cozi decide to bake her a cake. They mistake dynamite sticks for candles, causing the cake to explode.
16	10	"Going Home"	1997
Cozi pines about his home planet and Snug builds Cozi a one-man space rocket. It launches but falls apart later, sending them crashing down to Earth.
