= Jackie Kabler =

British television presenter

Jackie Kabler (born 1966) is a British freelance television presenter and reporter for QVC and writer.

== Life ==
Kabler was born in Coventry, Warwickshire. She moved to Ireland and achieved a zoology degree from Trinity College Dublin. Her first job after graduation was with the Commonwealth Agricultural Bureau.

She began a career in journalism, firstly working as a presenter and reporter for Channel Television and then ITV West. She joined breakfast TV programme GMTV in 2000. She worked there for nine years, two as a reporter and producer and seven as a roving correspondent. Among the major stories Kabler covered for GMTV were: the Soham murders; interviewing Ian Huntley on live television days before his arrest for the murders; the impeachment of US President Clinton; the Washington, D.C. sniper attacks; the 2004 Athens Olympics, the 2004 Indian Ocean earthquake; and the disappearance of Madeleine McCann. She also hosted shows on Setanta Sports News and presented a property show for Sky.

In February 2013 Kabler began presenting for QVC. She currently co-presents Ruth Langsford's Fashion Edit alongside Ruth Langsford for QVC.

Kabler is also a bestselling crime writer, who is published by HarperCollins imprint One More Chapter. She first published a series of books known as the Cora Baxter mysteries. Her titles include Am I Guilty? (2019), The Happy Couple (2020), The Happy Family (2021), The Murder List (2022) and The Vanishing of Class 3B (2023). She achieved the Nielsen Silver Bestseller Award in 2023.
