= New York Stadium =

Football stadium in England

Coordinates: 53.4279°N 1.362°W

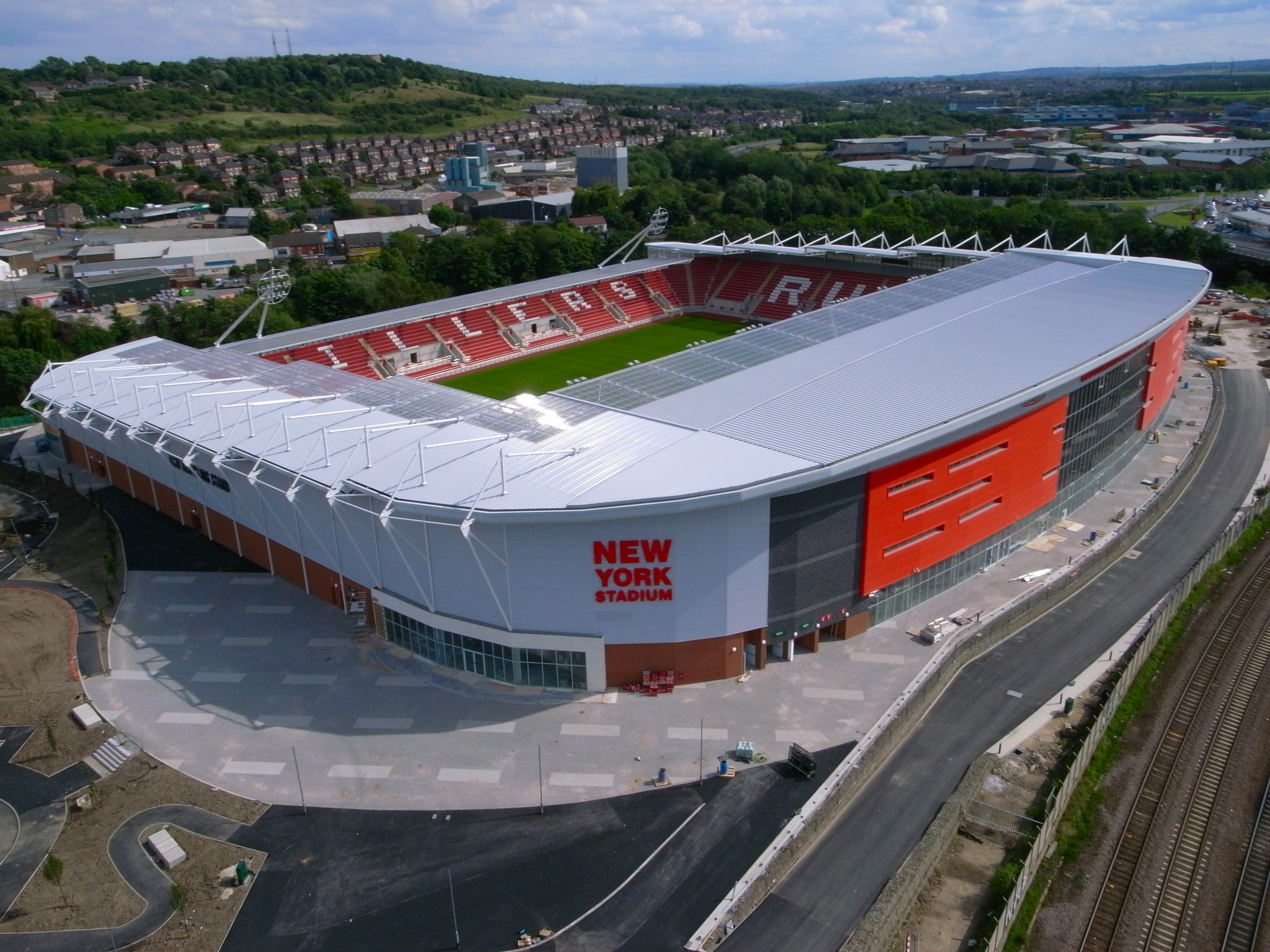
- Interactive map of New York Stadium
- Location: New York Stadium; New York Way; Rotherham; S60 1FJ
- Owner: Rotherham United F.C.
- Operator: Rotherham United F.C.
- Capacity: 12,021
- Surface: Grass
- Public transit: TT; Rotherham Central

Construction
- Groundbreaking: 16 June 2011
- Built: Planning permission granted, 2010
- Opened: 19 July 2012
- Cost: £20 million
- Architects: S&P Architects and 3E Consulting Engineers
- General contractors: Gleeds and GMI Construction

Tenant
- Rotherham United F.C. (2012–present)

Website
- www.aessealnewyorkstadium.com

The New York Stadium, currently known as the AESSEAL New York Stadium for sponsorship reasons, is a football stadium in Rotherham, South Yorkshire, England. Opened in July 2012, it is the home ground of Rotherham United Football Club, with a capacity of 12,021.

Historically the land that the stadium is situated on was called New York and is referenced in many maps up to around the 1980s, although it is said that the name is inspired by the Guest and Chrimes company which previously occupied the site for nearly 150 years. Guest and Chrimes manufactured a brass stop tap that was and still is in use in many fire hydrants worldwide, many hydrant covers have the foundry's name on them along with the towns name, the stop taps are also said to be used in the famous red fire hydrants of New York City.

Known colloquially as the NYS, it hosted several matches during the UEFA Women's Euro 2022.

== History ==
Rotherham United announced their intention to construct a new community stadium when they moved away from Millmoor to the Don Valley Stadium in May 2008 after a dispute with the ground owner Ken Booth. In January 2010 the club purchased the former site of the Guest and Chrimes Foundry to be used for the new stadium. Outline planning permission for the stadium was granted in November 2010, and the first images were sketched shortly after.

The name of the stadium was announced as the 'New York Stadium' on 19 December 2011, chosen ahead of 'The Foundry' and 'The Waterfront Stadium'. The reason for the name is that the area of land that the stadium lies upon is called 'New York' and it was thought that it would be better to name the stadium after history and/or where the stadium is situated, like nearby stadiums Bramall Lane and Hillsborough. Also Guest and Chrimes used to make fire hydrants for New York City. Chairman Tony Stewart also hoped that the name could bring investment from New York City or further afield, as the New York Yankees chairman had recently said that he wanted to invest in an English football team.

Construction started in June 2011 and the stadium was officially opened by Prince Edward, Duke of Kent on 12 March 2012. The first game played at the stadium was a pre-season match between Rotherham and Barnsley, held on 21 July 2012. The Millers won 2–1; the first goal in the stadium was scored by Jacob Mellis of Barnsley, and David Noble scored Rotherham's first goal in their new home. The New York Stadium made its league debut on 18 August 2012, in which Rotherham beat Burton Albion 3–0, Daniel Nardiello scoring the first competitive goal at the ground.

The naming rights to the stadium were announced as having been bought by local company AESSEAL, in a press conference on 21 November 2014. Club chairman Tony Stewart said the deal was worth six figures annually. It was also suggested as being the biggest sponsorship deal of the club's history.

== Other sporting events ==
=== England women's national team ===
On 8 April 2016, England women's national football team played a UEFA Women's Euro 2017 qualifying match versus Belgium at the stadium in front of 10,550 spectators.

The stadium has also gone on to host further England women's team games after the success of the first game again attracting large full house crowds.

=== UEFA Women's Euro 2022 ===
The stadium hosted several matches as part of the UEFA Women's Euro 2022. It was used to host Group D matches, alongside the Academy Stadium, and a quarter-final.

Date	Home	Away	Result	Attendance	Stage
10 July 2022	France	Italy	5–1	8,541	UEFA Women's Euro 2022 Group D
14 July 2022	France	Belgium	2–1	8,173	UEFA Women's Euro 2022 Group D
18 July 2022	Iceland	France	1–1	7,392	UEFA Women's Euro 2022 Group D
23 July 2022	France	Netherlands	1–0 (a.e.t)	9,764	UEFA Women's Euro 2022 Quarter Final

=== England men's youth team ===
Several of England's youth teams have hosted fixtures at the stadium including the Under 19’s 3–0 win over Italy in 2014 to a large crowd. The stadium has also hosted the Under 20s team as well.

== Design ==
The stadium has a 12,000 all-seated capacity, with the option to be able to increase the stadium's capacity if needed. It cost approximately £17 million to construct. The stadium includes The 1925 Club, a corporate hospitality suite. Local businesses such as Norton Finance and Premier Hytemp were some of the first members.

At the beginning of the 2014–15 season, a large video screen was installed in the north west corner of the stadium.

=== Stands ===
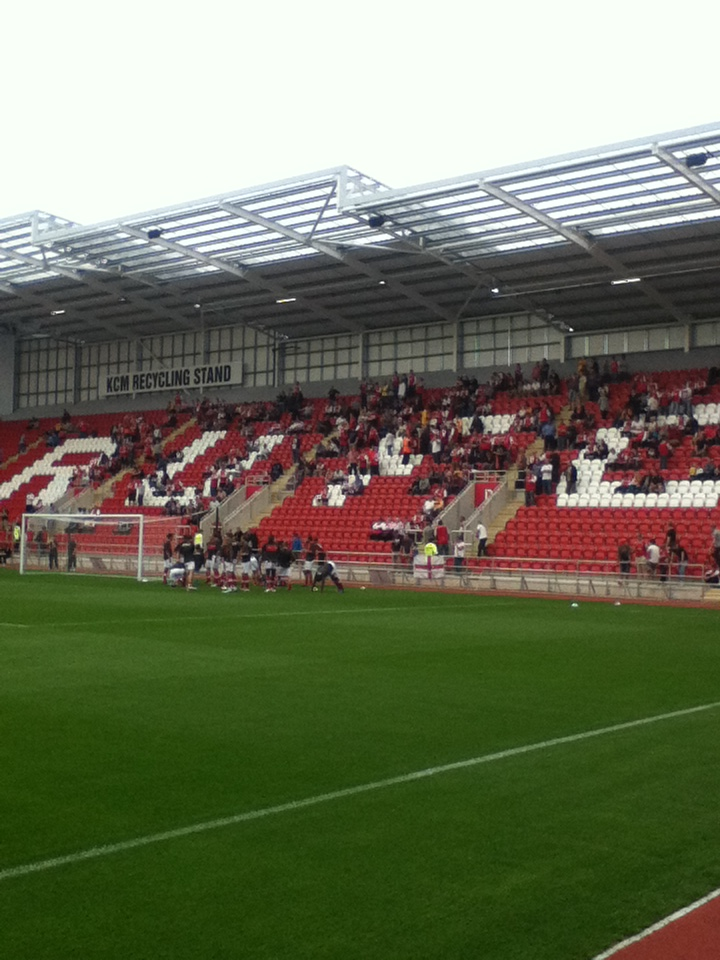
The north stand

North Stand

The North Stand, known as the KCM Recycling Stand for sponsorship reasons, and often referred to as the New Tivoli, is the kop stand of the stadium. It holds 2,000 home fans, and has the lettering of the club's initials in white across it. The stand is located behind one of the goals, opposite the away end.

West Stand

The West Stand, known as the Eric Twigg Foods Pukka Pies Stand for sponsorship reasons, is the main stand of the stadium. It features the executive 1925 Lounge, and is the stand the players walk through when entering the field of play. It holds 4,000 home fans.

East Stand

The East Stand, known as the Ben Bennett Family Stand, is the stadium's family stand. It holds 4,000 home fans, as well as two built-in balcony-type structures for disabled people.

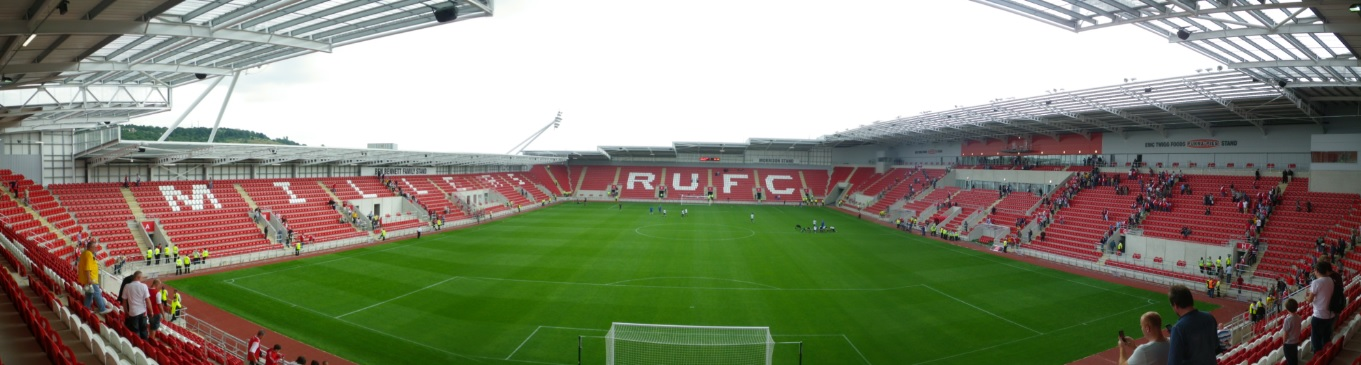
Rotherham vs Barnsley – First ever game at the New York Stadium, 21 July 2012

South Stand

The South Stand, known as the Mears Stand, is a 2,000-seater away stand. It is located behind a goal, with the family stand to the right, the main stand to the left, and the kop directly opposite.

== Records ==
- Record attendance: 11,541 v. Sheffield Wednesday, 2 March 2024
