= Wacaday =

British children's television series (1985–1992)

- Starring: Timmy Mallett
- Country of origin: United Kingdom
- No. of episodes: c. 455

Production
- Running time: 25 minutes

Original release
- Network: TV-am (ITV)
- Release: 1985 – 1992

Wacaday is a children's television series in the United Kingdom that ran in TV-am's school-holidays slot from October 1985 until 1992, in an 8:50–9:25 a.m. slot, and was hosted by Timmy Mallett.

== History ==
Wacaday was introduced when Roland Rat, the puppet host of TV-am's previous weekday morning slot during school holidays, transferred to the BBC. With only a week until October half term was due to start, it was decided to produce a spin-off of the existing and successful Saturday morning programme, Wide Awake Club. Timmy Mallett, the best-known presenter of Wide Awake Club, was chosen to front the new show. The "wac" of the title took the initials of Wide Awake Club.

The show was devised and produced by Nick Wilson and first broadcast on 21 October 1985. The initial 1985 run consisted of basic features and competitions, but from its second run in 1986, the format quickly began to develop, with Mallett's Mallet being introduced. Michaela Strachan co-presented the show with Mallett during the summers of 1987 until 1989.

== Overview ==
The programme was similar in style to Wide Awake Club, which was also broadcast live and featured items such as the word-association games 'Bonk’n’Boob' and 'Mallett's Mallet' as well as 'Drop Your Toast', where Timmy Mallett would read out a viewer's name in the hope that they would be so shocked that they would drop their toast. From 1987, every series (there were six a year – one for each school holiday) would be themed around a different country that Timmy Mallett had visited. Pre-recorded reports from these countries would educate viewers about the country's culture, customs and history (though in a humorous way, including Mallett often acting out famous scenes from that country's past). In later series, the studio set was also decorated in the particular country's theme.

Other regular features included a narrated story about the adventures of Magic, Timmy Mallett's cockatiel, various phone-in quizzes (typically at the end of the programme) where a selected viewer would compete in some gunge-related competition, and a short five-minute cartoon, such as Transformers, Galaxy High School, Batfink, Challenge of the GoBots or Dick Tracy. Although some minor items appeared and were retired over the years, the overall structure of the series remained the same throughout the show's life.

The self-proclaimed 'show your telly was made for' eventually became even more successful than Wide Awake Club and is the programme for which Mallett is probably best remembered. In fact, many of Timmy Mallett's trademarks, such as his giant pink mallet Pinky Punky (introduced in 1990) and 'bleugh!' catchphrase originated on Wacaday. The "bleugh" saying originated from the rules of Mallet's Mallet, where Timmy Mallett would hurriedly repeat the rules every day. On one occasion early in the feature's life, he fluffed the lines and came out with "bleugh" – and from there, the catchphrase was born.

Pinky Punky is a soft plush hammer with a yellow handle, pink head with glasses, and yellow "punk" hairstyle. Pinky was famous for his catchphrase: "Mr. Mallett! Mr. Mallett! Can I go to the toilet?" A Pinky Punky can be seen in the Herbert Art Gallery and Museum in Coventry, after he was donated by Mallett.

Later on in Wacaday's run, Mallett's infamous routine of hitting people over the head with his giant foam mallet was changed slightly, particularly in the Mallett's Mallet game, where he would instead hit large buttons on a machine to keep score, as the producers feared that young viewers at home might try and copy the routine by hitting people over the head with heavy objects.

The programme outlived its parent by two years, but ended in 1992 when TV-am lost its franchise.

== Other ==
The 2007 debut release by British trio Scouting For Girls contains a tribute to Michaela Strachan and Wacaday in a hidden track 11. In the printed lyrics on many websites "Wacaday" is incorrectly written as "Why Good Day".

Magic, the cockatiel in the show, is buried in Timmy Mallett's garden.
