= TV Warehouse =

British infomercial shopping channel

Programming
- Picture format: 16:9, 576i (SDTV)

Ownership
- Owner: Canis Media

History
- Launched: November 2001; 24 years ago 11 September 2013; 12 years ago (revival)
- Replaced: Discount TV

Links
- Website: www.tvwarehouse.com

TV Warehouse is an infomercial-based shopping channel brand based in the UK. The channel is owned and was originally launched by Canis Media.

== History ==
TV Warehouse first launched in November 2001 by Sirius Retail Television. A sister channel TV Warehouse Select was launched in May 2002. In May 2005, both TV Warehouse channels were sold to TV Network.

On July 15, 2008, TV Warehouse Select was renamed TV Warehouse 2. TV Network soon went into liquidation. JML purchased both channels

On 2 February 2009, both channels were rebranded and were replaced by JML Home & DIY and Shop Now TV.

On 11 September 2013, Canis Media relaunched TV Warehouse on Sky channel 657 and Freesat channel 804. It was moved to Sky channel 667 on 19 August 2014 and removed from Freesat later the same month. TV Warehouse continues to air popular and well known infomercials in Poland and the UK.

It moved to Sky channel 676 on 1 May 2018.

== See also ==
- JML Direct
- Screenshop
