= Bid Plus =

- Country: United Kingdom
- Broadcast area: United Kingdom

Programming
- Picture format: 16:9, 576i (SDTV)

Ownership
- Owner: Bid Shopping
- Sister channels: Bid; Price Drop

History
- Launched: 27 July 2005
- Replaced: Screenshop 2
- Closed: 1 July 2013
- Former names: Speed Auction TV (2005–2011); Speed Auction (2011–2013)

Bid Plus (formerly Speed Auction) was a British television shopping channel owned by Bid Shopping. The channel ceased broadcast on 1 July 2013.

== History ==
Speed Auction TV logo used from 27 July 2005 until 1 August 2011.

=== Early history ===
In March 2005, Sit-Up announced that they would launch a third shopping channel entitled Speed Auction TV during the Summer of 2005. The channel was a spin-off of the "Speed Auctions" strand on Bid TV, featuring live rising price auctions. The strand ran on the channel from October 2000 and January 2005, being removed when the channel transitioned to featuring falling price auctions. Prior to the strand's removal, the Speed Auctions became pre-recorded.

The channel launched on 27 July on Sky Digital, NTL:Home Digital and Telewest Active Digital, broadcasting from 12:00pm-1:00am daily. Live rising price auctions were only available Wednesday to Sunday between 4pm to 8pm and 9pm to midnight. Pre-recorded auctions were available the remainder of the time.

=== The flip of the arrow ===
In October 2005, the format of the channel was changed to purely focusing on falling price auctions. However, unlike Price-Drop TV and Bid TV, the channel sold its lots with a smaller quantity in each auction and in a shorter period of time, justifying the word "speed" in its name. The live broadcasting hours were still the same as the previous rising price format, and the pre-recorded slots were still being filled in with rising price auctions.

On 3 March 2006, it returned to its original rising price auction format. The hours were unchanged and pre-recorded slots are still filled with rising price auctions.

The channel changed its format for a 2nd time to falling priced auctions on 26 March 2008. It was also the day when Speed Auction TV extended its live broadcast hours. They were available live Wednesdays to Mondays 7:45am to 1:30am and Tuesdays from 1:30pm to 1:30am, with the channel showing Screenshop during its downtime. The channel continued to sell a variety of products continuously throughout the day, without any particular themes shows. Since then, the channel has no longer shown any live or pre-recorded rising price auctions.

=== Reformatting ===
In Summer 2009, it operated like its sister channels by selling products through themed hours meaning there were more similar products being sold during a time. Some of the themes included Electrical Store, Jewellery Extravaganza, Outlet Live, Fashion Store and Home Makeover. Sometimes the themes last up to four hours. In November 2009, the whole of the output on the channel was based on Outlet Live meaning the price went to a clearance price with quantities much lower than usual. Although after the Christmas period, they returned to their normal falling price auctions.

From 13 October 2009 and 17 January 2012, the channel was also available on the Freesat platform.

=== Speed Auction (2011–2013) ===
Speed Auction logo from August 2011 to February 2013.

On 1 August 2011, 'Speed Auction TV' changed its name to 'Speed Auction' dropping the 'TV' part of their name. Along with the new name, new buying graphics were introduced on all three Bid Shopping channels and new idents compromising of different 3D products flying around the new logo designs were shown. The new design was created to make buying easier for the viewer. At the same time as the new channel design, multi-buy was introduced on certain products where the viewer can select to buy more than one product at the same time (P&P is still applied to each item).

On 1 February 2012, Speed Auction 'relaunched' with a new studio and the return of the gavel, although they still use the same falling price dynamic. This was dropped on 7 November 2012.

=== Bid Plus and closure (2013) ===
In February 2013, Speed Auction changed its name to 'Bid Plus', after launching a new studio alongside updated graphics hiding the product quantities and using a green colour scheme in November 2012. At the channel's launch, promos making reference to 'Speed Auction Live' were still being broadcast, however by February 2013, the Speed Auction broadcasts were finally dropped. The auction theme was removed, and left the channel as fixed-price. The Speed Auction website was still available until March 2013.

On 21 May 2013, it was announced that the Advertising Standards Authority (ASA) had referred Sit-Up Limited, who operate Bid Plus to Ofcom for consideration of statutory sanctions following repeated breaches of the UK Code of Broadcast Advertising. Ofcom has confirmed that it has accepted the referral. Since January 2012, there have been 33 ASA rulings against Sit-Up Ltd. The two main types of problem have been misleading pricing claims and misleading product descriptions.

On 1 July 2013, Bid Plus removed all remaining live content and transitioned into a full-time teleshopping network. The channel's website was also closed at the same time. Two months later on 1 September, the channel's slot ceased operations entirely. Months following the closure, Bid Shopping went into administration with the company's last remaining channels Shop at Bid and Price Drop were closed down with immediate effect with 229 jobs being lost.

== See also ==
- Bid
- Bid Shopping
- Price Drop
