= QVC Beauty =

Programming
- Picture format: 576i (16:9 SDTV); 1080i (HDTV)

Ownership
- Owner: Qurate Retail Group
- Sister channels: QVC; QVC Style; QVC Extra

History
- Launched: 26 October 2010
- Replaced: Bilberry TV (On Sky)
- Closed: 21 June 2023 (on Freeview)
- Replaced by: QVC2 (on Freeview)

Links
- Website: www.qvcuk.com

Availability

Terrestrial
- Freeview: Channel 37 (19:00-13:00)

QVC Beauty is a digital television shopping channel broadcast in the United Kingdom, specializing in beauty products. It is the sister channel to QVC. The channel launched on Tuesday 26 October 2010 and is available on Sky, Freesat and online, and was formerly available on Freeview until 21 June 2023 when it was replaced by QVC2.

== History ==
QVC Beauty began as a red button stream in 2008, previously called the Beauty Channel, which was only available through QVC Active. On 23 July 2010, the Sky EPG slot for Blueberry TV was acquired from Blueberry TV Ltd. and transferred to QVC, who renamed it Bilberry TV. QVC renamed their existing Ofcom television broadcast license for QVC Beauty as Bilberry TV.

On 4 May 2011, QVC Beauty was launched on Freeview channel 48. On 26 March 2012, the channel moved to Freeview channel 35. On 4 November 2020, the channel moved to channel 36 as part of a move up where every channel from channel 24 to 54 on the platform moved up one place to allow BBC Four to move to channel 24 in Scotland due to new Ofcom rules regarding certain PSB channels requiring greater prominence on EPGs.

On April 15, 2026, QVC Group warned that it was preparing to file for Chapter 11 bankruptcy as soon as the end of that day, citing steadily viewer declines and debt burdens. QVC Group plans to enter a prepackaged restructuring support agreement with its creditors and exit Chapter 11 bankruptcy within no later than 90 days, or by around July 2026. On April 16, QVC Group filed for Chapter 11 bankruptcy protection in the United States District Court for the Southern District of Texas with plans to reduce over $5 billion in long-term debt, which will allow for the company to continue operating while having over $1 billion in debt remaining.
