= Shop LC =

American home shopping television network

- Country: United States
- Broadcast area: United States and Canada
- Headquarters: Austin, Texas

Programming
- Language: English
- Picture format: 1080i (HDTV); 480i (SDTV)

Ownership
- Owner: Vaibhav Global
- Sister channels: The Jewellery Channel (United Kingdom)

History
- Launched: 2007
- Former names: The Jewelry Channel (2007-09); Liquidation Channel (2009-16)

Links
- Website: www.shoplc.com

Availability

Terrestrial
- Available over the air in select markets: Check local listings

Streaming media
- Digital media receiver: Roku channel
- Live stream: Watch live

Shop LC, formerly known as Liquidation Channel and The Jewelry Channel, is an American cable television shopping channel based in Austin, Texas. The network is a subsidiary of the Indian-based Vaibhav Global Limited.

The network's reach is approximately 77 million households in the United States. The network sells inventory in a reverse auction format. It additionally airs late nights on the American broadcast networks Retro TV, LATV, and TeleXitos through a time brokerage agreement, along with varied digital subchannel coverage nationwide. The channel primarily sells jewelry, beauty, fashion, home decor and lifestyle products.

== History ==
Shop LC was originally launched as The Jewelry Channel in 2007.

In 2009, The Jewelry Channel was renamed as Liquidation Channel and switched over to a discount liquidation model in 2009 due to a lack of demand for luxury items in the Great Recession, and to reduce confusion with the already-existing Jewelry Television. The channel originally expected to liquidate merchandise and cease operations.

Jewelry Television sued Liquidation Channel for infringement of a reverse auction patent in June 2013. In October 2015, the Patent Trial and Appeal Board invalidated Jewelry Television's "abstract ideas" patent based on the previous Alice Corp. v. CLS Bank International ruling. On May 28, 2015, two customers sued the channel over falsely advertised discounts.

On January 9, 2017, Liquidation Channel officially rebranded itself as Shop LC; it had already removed all uses of the Liquidation Channel branding in full throughout 2016, branding solely as "LC". The meaning of the LC abbreviation was also changed so the channel's name now stands for "Shop Low-Cost". Kevin Lyons, president of Shop LC, stated that the rebrand to Shop LC is "about evolution". In addition to the name change, Shop LC designed new broadcast studios, updated television and website graphics and expanded its corporate headquarters.

In early 2021, Vaibhav Global came to terms with Hearst Television to carry the network on that station group's subchannels in a number of major markets, and has also added other broadcast subchannel affiliates throughout the United States to extend its coverage. The Hearst deal ended on May 1, 2022.

On November 18, 2021, it was announced that Shop LC would relocate from Austin proper to suburban Cedar Park by 2024, with the encouragement of sales tax and job creation incentives to build a production, office, and warehouse facility planned to be 200,000 square feet (19,000 m^{2}), however this move has yet to occur.

== See also ==
- The Jewellery Channel
- Vaibhav Global Limited
