= TJC (TV channel) =

British home shopping channel and retailer

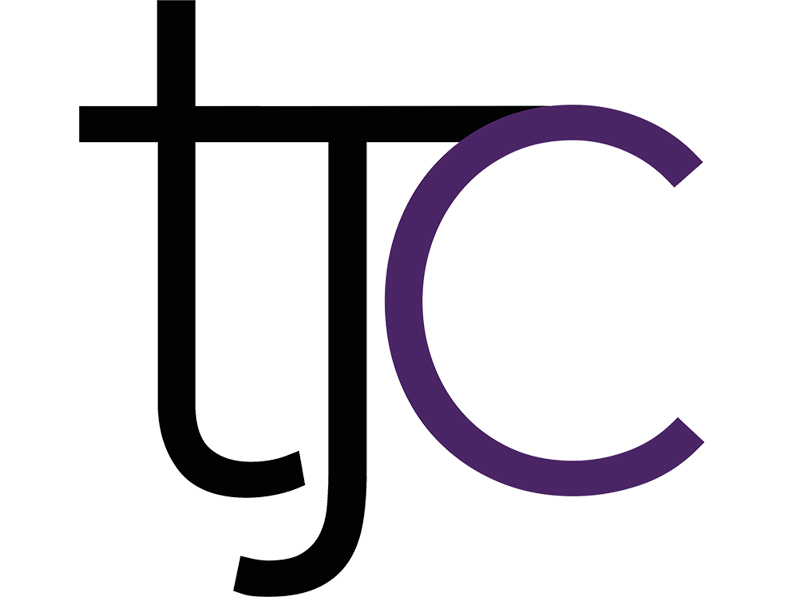
- TJC.co.uk
- Country: United Kingdom; Ireland
- Headquarters: Surrey House, Plane Tree Cres, Feltham, TW13 7HF

Programming
- Picture format: 576i (SDTV 16:9)

Ownership
- Owner: Gemporia Craft; Shop Unlimited Live Ltd
- Sister channels: Shop LC; QVC UK hobby create and craft TV ideal world TV HobbyMaker

History
- Launched: 4 April 2006

Links
- Website: www.tjc.co.uk

Availability

Terrestrial
- Freeview: Channel 22

The Jewellery Channel, known otherwise as TJC, is a British home shopping channel and online retailer specialising in jewellery, home, beauty, fashion, gemstones and other lifestyle accessories. It is one of the main TV shopping channels in the UK. The channel launched on 4 April 2006, and currently broadcasts 24 hours a day.

== Background ==
TJC is part of the Vaibhav Global Limited (VGL) group, and is a sister network to Shop LC in the United States. The company mines and handcrafts many of the products sold on its TV networks, hence its claim to cut out the "middleman" and to attempt to undercut high-street prices.

On 14 January 2008, The Jewellery Channel moved from Teddington Studios to new purpose-built studios in Middlesex, simultaneously switching to widescreen-format broadcasting.

On 11 April 2008, The Jewellery Channel launched delivery to the Republic of Ireland for the first time.

In November 2019, The Jewellery Channel HD launched on Freeview and Virgin Media. It closed on the former service on 22 June 2020 to help make room for COM7 following the closure of COM8.

In May 2020, TJC formally changed their registered company name to 'Shop TJC Limited'. This was recorded at Companies House in the UK. The change was taken to reflect that the channel has broadened the products it sells into jewellery, lifestyle and homewares.

In June 2020, similar to ITV's broadcasting of Ideal World and Create and Craft, TJC began simulcasting live broadcasts on More4 during the channel's downtime hours.

On 15 March 2021, TJC HD launched on Sky, and then launched the following month on Freesat on 26 April.

In 2023, it was announced that TJC had bought the rights to former shopping channel Ideal World. They plan to utilise by upgrading the website and relaunching the channel in TJC Beauty's slot on sky.

In September 2023, TJC acquired Mindful Souls for €12 million.

== Product offering ==
TJC sells a wide variety of gemstone jewellery, loose gemstones, watches, fashion jewellery and simulated gemstone pieces. They are one of the eight sightholders of the Tanzanite One mine.

They also sell their own jewellery brands:

- Elanza – Simulated diamond jewellery
- EON 1962 – Classic-style watches
- Genoa – Fashion watches combined with classic design features
- Iliana – Gemstones set into 18 carat gold
- J Francis – Silver with platinum overlay and accessories
- Karis – Gold- and platinum-bonded jewellery
- Rhapsody – Gemstones set into platinum
- Strada – Fashion watches

They also have collaborated with other brands:

- Lucy Q
- Rachel Galley

The channel holds themed days such as 'Tanzanite Day'. It also holds discount days where it reduces the final auction prices by 10% or 17.5% (the latter the equivalent to the UK 17.5% VAT charge), or Under £20 or £10 days.

The firm launched an additional channel, TJC Gold, in October 2012 to offer more expensive gold and platinum collections. It ran for six hours a day. It has since shut down.

The firm also launched the channels TJC Beauty and TJC Style, the latter of which shut down.

TJC also sell kitchenware, homeware, electronics, garden wares, as well as a range of beauty and style products.

== Website ==
TJC's website offers their full catalogue of products (approximately 15,000 items), online rising auctions, on-air auction products and web offers not available on-air; TJC's channel can be watched from the website. The TJC blog includes information on products, jewellery trends, interviews with guests, exclusive promotions and backstage 'gossip'. Its Facebook page which offers similar content to their blog, and also offers consumers the chance to interact with them.

There is also an educational section offering consumers additional information on gemstones - Gemopedia. Other educational guides include a diamond buying guide and ring size guide.

== Customer service ==
TJC has two call centers, one in India and one in UK which operates seven days a week from 9am - 6pm. The UK call centre is based in Feltham, south west London and the Indian call centre is based in Jaipur. A personal shopping service is also available, and an online chat function is available on their website. Consumers watching the channel live can text in and interact with the presenters.

== Presenters ==
- Andrew Bernard
- Andy Hodgson
- Carmel Thomas
- Caroline Lyndsay
- Chloe Marshall
- Cris St. Valery
- Derek Gibbons
- Jenny Cleary
- Jo Grimwood
- Lianna Bagley
- Lindsey Gundersen - Departing
- Mark Gould
- Marina Berry
- Stacey Ellis
- Vicki Browne

== Regulation ==
TJC has been censured by the Advertising Standards Authority the following times since 2007/8

The Jewellery Channel was fined £3,200 by Trading Standards for making false claims about the treatment of a gemstone product sold through its TV channel. After complaints were made, the channel discovered that it had been selling jewellery described as natural 'pink topaz’, when in fact it was colourless topaz sprayed pink.

Auction date, 25 August 2013: The ASA received a complaint as to whether an auction starting price was misleading and exaggerated the item's value. Although the Jewellery Channel attributes no worth or value to the starting price, the ASA upheld the complaint on the grounds that, in this case, most viewers would infer that the opening figure represented a genuine valuation of the ring, and therefore the final reduced price was a genuine saving.

== Platform availability ==
TJC is available on Sky and Freeview 24 hours a day. On 22 November 2009, TJC was added to Freesat on channel 815.

The channel was also carried on Freeview channel 44 between 7pm and 9pm between December 2007 and May 2008. The channel was replaced with a second Gems TV stream, which itself ceased in April 2009 as it was used for extended hours of CNN. On 21 September 2011, TJC returned to Freeview on channel 60. On 19 September 2012, TJC moved to Freeview channel 49 as part of a reshuffle of the EPG. On 4 November 2020, the channel moved to channel 50 as part of a move up where every channel from channel 24 to 54 on the platform moved up one place to allow BBC Four to move to channel 24 in Scotland due to new Ofcom rules regarding certain PSB channels requiring greater prominence on EPGs.

TJC also simulcasts on 5USA between 6am and 12pm, allowing the channel to be available to viewers on Virgin Media and TalkTalk TV, in addition to Freesat, Freeview and Sky.
