= Fool Around With =

British television series

- Genre: Reality
- Country of origin: United Kingdom
- Original language: English
- No. of series: 3
- No. of episodes: 99

Production
- Running time: 30–60 minutes
- Production company: Endemol UK Productions West

Original release
- Network: E4
- Release: 2 November 2004 – 19 May 2005

Fool Around With is a British reality television show that aired on E4 from 2 November 2004 to 19 May 2005.

== Format ==
Four women or men are locked up together with a single person, who tries to determine which of the four contestants is also single; the other three contestants have boyfriends or girlfriends. If the lone single person figures out which of the four contestants is also single, the person wins £10,000.

== Transmissions ==
Series	Start date	End date	Episodes
1	2 November 2004	18 December 2004	35
2	24 January 2005	7 April 2005	40
3	11 April 2005	19 May 2005	24
