= Price Drop =

- Country: United Kingdom
- Broadcast area: United Kingdom

Programming
- Picture format: 16:9, 576i (SDTV)

Ownership
- Owner: Bid Shopping
- Sister channels: Shop at Bid

History
- Launched: 11 June 2003
- Closed: 17 April 2014
- Former names: Price-Drop.TV (2003–2005); Price-Drop TV (2005–2011)

Availability (at time of closure)

Terrestrial
- Freeview: Channel 37

Price Drop was a British television shopping channel based in the UK, that ran daily live reverse auctions. It was the first reverse auction channel of its kind in the world. The channel was owned by Bid Shopping.

== History ==
Price-Drop TV logo used from 21 January 2005 until 1 August 2011.

=== 2003–2005: Price-Drop.TV ===
The channel first launched as Price-Drop.TV on 11 June 2003. The channel began broadcasting from 4pm to 12 midnight, Wednesdays to Saturdays. The hours of live broadcast were then extended to 7.45am to 1.30am, 7 days a week. It was available to more than 12 million homes in the UK, and made weekly revenue of over £3 million.

Prior to December 2004, each 'price drop' started at the Clear price. After guide prices were removed, it was no longer possible to judge how closely the starting prices reflected the true value of products. A certain number of units of a product were advertised at a specified price, and buyers could place orders by telephone. The price was decreased in steps until all units were sold. All purchasers paid the final, lowest, price. Occasionally, the channel had promotions where a small number of products "Megadrop" to £1 during a special event (it appeared to be random, but directors chose which products will Megadrop beforehand). Megadrops were also used on sister channel Bid, but Price Drop was the first to use the promotion.

=== 2005–2011: Price-Drop TV ===
On 21 January 2005, the channel was renamed from Price-Drop.TV to Price-Drop TV, losing only the 'dot' part of the channel's name.

In October 2005, a start price graphic was introduced, effectively reinstating a rephrased guide price. The "start price" was used to show the starting price of the reverse auction, but was not used to represent a value or worth.

On 10 May 2006, products were now sold at prices in pounds and pence instead of just pounds.

=== 2011–2014: Price Drop and closure ===
On 1 August 2011, 'Price-Drop TV' rebranded as 'Price Drop' dropping the 'TV' and '-' from the channel's name. Along with the new name, new buying graphics were introduced on all three Bid Shopping channels and new idents compromising of different 3D products flying around the new logo designs were shown. The new design was created to make buying easier for the viewer. At the same time as the new channel design, multi-buy was introduced on certain products where the viewer can select to buy more than one product at the same time (P&P is still applied to each item).

On 30 March 2012 at 6pm, Price Drop "re-launched" with a completely new set, but still in their existing studio. The new set primarily consisted of a brick-work wall design with blue and purple lighting filling the left and right window cut-outs. In the centre of the simulated wall there was another cut-out which housed four LCD screen panels that constructed the main visual display on the Price Drop set; this also provided a backdrop for images and video behind the presenters and assistants.

On 21 May 2013, it was announced that the Advertising Standards Authority (ASA) had referred Bid-Up Limited, who operated Price Drop, to Ofcom for consideration of statutory sanctions following repeated breaches of the UK Code of Broadcast Advertising. Ofcom has confirmed that it has accepted the referral. Since January 2012, there have been 33 ASA rulings against Bid-Up Ltd. The two main types of problem have been misleading pricing claims and misleading product descriptions.

On 17 April 2014, the channel's owner Bid Shopping went into administration; Price Drop and its sister channel Shop at Bid were closed down with immediate effect with 229 jobs being lost. Websites for the channels were immediately pulled offline, and a technical fault card appeared on the channels. On 23 April 2014, the Bid and Price Drop websites were updated with information regarding the administration, and the channels were pulled from Virgin Media and Sky Broadband. The channels were removed from Freeview and Sky on 25 April 2014. On Freesat & Virgin Media, its EPG was taken by QVC Beauty. On Freeview, its EPG was taken by Quest.

== Broadcasting on Freeview ==
Price Drop launched on Freeview on 2 December 2003 on channel 24. The channel originally broadcast on multiplex 2, operated by Digital 3&4.

Price Drop had to move to multiplex A on 1 October 2004, when ITV wanted the capacity to launch ITV3 a month later.

On 5 January 2009, Price Drop was removed from the Freeview digital platform, as Bid-Up Shopping lost its space on multiplex A. It was outbid for renewal of its carriage contract by Discovery Networks UK, which launched the entertainment channel Quest. The channel returned to Freeview in August 2009 - but, because it was time-sharing capacity with SmileTV3, its hours were limited to 8am to 12 midnight.

In late June 2012, Price Drop started broadcasting on new Freeview capacity from 8am to 2am in post-digital switchover areas, which included all areas of the United Kingdom by 24 October 2012.

== Additional information ==
- Megadrop: Products sell for £1.
- Non Stop Drop: Price will not stop falling (until £1) until quantity reaches zero.
- Penny Deals: Products sell for £0.01.
- Steal the Deal: Product is sold for less than the usual price.
- Warehouse Clearance: All products remaining in the warehouse are sold at even lower prices.

== Past presenters ==
- Nana Akua
- Steven Anderson
- Marina Berry
- Lisa Brash
- Tori Campbell
- Lisa Celisse
- Natalie Cleverley
- Rhiannon Duffin
- Paul Evers
- Danielle Fearnon
- Eric Gill
- Marie Greenwood
- Lindsey Gundersen
- Justin Hazell
- Kate Heavenor
- Adam Heppenstall
- David Johnson
- Janine Jones
- Guy Kean
- Michelle Livings
- Gerry McCulloch
- Andrea McLean
- Eilidh Nairn
- Chris Park
- Seema Pathan
- Daryl Petrie
- Mark Ryes
- Gemma Scott
- Greg Scott
- Peter Sherlock
- Claire Stuart
- Cris St. Valery
- Michelle Watt

== Retail store ==
A pilot retail outlet at the Hatfield Galleria opened in 2004 selling goods initially at close to RRP, and dropping the price each day. Another store opened at Kingsgate Shopping Centre in Huddersfield around the same time. Due to the global recession and questions over stock quality, both stores were closed in April 2009.

== See also ==
- Bid Plus
- Bid Shopping
- Shop at Bid
