= Bid Shopping =

British teleshopping network

sit-up Ltd.
- Company type: Limited company subsidiary
- Traded as: Bid Shopping
- Industry: Broadcasting
- Founded: 2000
- Defunct: 17 April 2014
- Fate: Administration
- Headquarters: Bid Shopping; Sit-Up House; 179–181 The Vale; London. W3 7RW, UK
- Key people: Wendelin Mueller Chief Executive; Clive Bradshaw Director of Information Systems; Joe Barry Director of Operations; Bryan Crenol Director of Finance
- Products: Shopping Television Channels
- Revenue: Unknown
- Number of employees: 766 (as of 31 December 2005)

Sit-Up Ltd., traded as Bid Shopping, was an English broadcaster which launched in 2000. It operated a portfolio of falling price shopping television channels to over 12 million homes in the UK. The channels were designed to sell consumer products via digital TV (currently carried by digital satellite, cable, and terrestrial) or the Internet.

== History ==
=== Early history ===
Sit-Up was founded in 2000, with their first television network - Bid-Up.TV launching in October of that year.

In March 2001, it was announced that Telewest Communications would sell their Screenshop teleshopping service to Sit Up for £10 million, of which it would merge into Bid Up.TV's operations while Telewest would take a 38% stake valued at a £14.8m cash injection into Sit Up.

On 29 August 2002, a second Screenshop channel was launched on Sky Digital.

In March 2003, Sit Up announced that they would launch their second shopping network - Price Drop.TV.

In July 2004, Sit Up signed a four-year deal with Vector Direct to allow Vector to exclusively supply Screenshop's teleshopping programming, as well as during the downtime on Bid Up and Price Drop. The deal was valued at £5 million.

=== Sale to Telewest and Expansion ===
In January 2005, Bid Up.TV and Price Drop.TV were rebranded as Bid TV and Price Drop TV. In the same month, it was announced that they would launch two free-to-air movie channels called Real-movies.tv and Movies on 333. Real-movies.tv was to be female-orientated with an emphasis on true stories, whilst Movies on 333 (intended for Sky Digital channel 333) would focus on western and niche films. However, another company would launch their own free-to-air movie channel just ahead of Sit-Up's in the 333 slot; True Movies was also female orientated with an emphasis on true stories. Sit-Up changed their original channel proposals, with Matinee Movies and Bad Movies emerging as their new channels (details below), which both launched on 25 April. On 16 May, Telewest announced that they would fully purchase Sit-Up for £194 million. In December 2005, American licensing company 4Kids Entertainment had talks with Sit-Up to secure a 5-year lease to air a three-hour strand of children's programmes on either Bid TV or Price Drop TV in the mornings. The deal never materialised upon the initial announcement.

In January 2009, Virgin Media announced the sale of Sit-Up to Aurelius AG for an undisclosed amount. The deal was closed on 1 April.

=== Rebranding and Collapse ===
In September 2010, Sit Up launched dibbing.com, an online-exclusive auction site.

On 1 August 2011, Sit-Up announced that it would rename itself as Bid Shopping, with its main portfolio of brands rebranding as Bid, Price Drop and Speed Auction. The dibbing.com website was rebranded as pricedropper.co.uk.

Since January 2012, there have been 33 ASA rulings against Sit-Up Ltd. The two main types of problem have been misleading pricing claims and misleading product descriptions. On 21 May 2013, it was announced that the Advertising Standards Authority (ASA) had referred Sit-Up Limited to Ofcom for consideration of statutory sanctions following repeated breaches of the UK Code of Broadcast Advertising. Ofcom has confirmed that it has accepted the referral.

In December 2013, the struggling Bid Shopping group was taken over by former Corporate Restructuring Lawyer Bryan Green; the channel posted pre-tax losses of £7.4m in 2011 and a 10% fall in sales. In February 2014, it was revealed Bid Shopping had debts of £68m and was looking to enter a voluntary agreement with its creditors to keep the company going.

On 10 March 2014, Bid was rebranded as 'Shop at Bid' and took on a more traditional shopping channel look with the premium rate number replaced with a number costing 20p per minute, it also appears the channel is no longer having auctions and has gone for a traditional sell and buy format. On 17 April 2014, Bid Shopping was put into administration; Shop at Bid and its sister channel Price Drop were closed down with immediate effect with around 200 jobs being lost.

=== Failed relaunch ===
On 18 February 2015, Grant Miller, through the company Bid Shopping Limited, acquired the intellectual property, patents, brands, and domains of Sit-Up, which resulted in Sit-Up emerging from administration. Shortly afterward, the company relaunched the Screenshop and Bid TV website with the intention of both brands returning online and through television screens in 2016. However, nothing came forward with these plans, and the sites soon went offline.

The Screenshop website returned in 2024 with new plans to relaunch the brand as an online service. However, like the attempted relaunch from 2015, nothing has come forward with these plans.

== Channels ==
=== Shop at Bid ===
Shop at Bid (formerly known as Bid-Up.TV until 21 January 2005, Bid TV until 1 August 2011, and Bid until 10 March 2014) was a television shopping channel. It was the first auction channel of its kind in the UK.

The channel was launched on 5 October 2000. It started by broadcasting 12 hours a day, many of which were pre-recorded, with auction graphics overlaid so people could bid although the video itself was pre-recorded. It broadcast live for almost 18 hours a day from 07:45 to 01:30. Shop at Bid was available on Freeview channel 23, Virgin Media channel 745, Sky channel 645, Freesat channel 802, and WightFibre channel 704. It closed on 17 April 2014, because of Bid Shopping's closure.

=== Price Drop ===
Price Drop (formerly known as Price-Drop.TV until 21 January 2005 and as Price-Drop TV until 1 August 2011) was a television shopping channel that focuses on falling price auctions. Price Drop's channel format was the first of its type in the UK, using a falling price dynamic.

The channel was launched on 11 June 2003, broadcasting live between 16:00 to midnight, Wednesdays to Saturdays. It broadcast live for almost 18 hours a day from 07:45 to 01:30. Price Drop was available on Freeview channel 37, Virgin Media channel 741, Sky channel 654, Freesat channel 801, and WightFibre channel 706. It closed on 17 April 2014, because of Bid Shopping's closure.

=== Bid Plus ===
Bid Plus (formerly known as Speed Auction TV until 1 August 2011 and Speed Auction until March 2013) was a channel launched on 27 July 2005 and closed on 1 July 2013. The channel launched as 'Speed Auction TV' featuring rising price auctions lasting around 4 minutes. However, from 26 March 2008, the channel "flipped the arrow" and started selling all its products using a falling price dynamic, matching its sister channels Bid and Price Drop. On 1 August 2011, the channel changed its name to 'Speed Auction' dropping the 'TV' from its name. The channel was later renamed again to Bid Plus in March 2013 and lasted until its closure a few months later.

=== Pricedropper.co.uk ===
Pricedropper.co.uk launched on 25 August 2010 and was Bid Shopping's online-only channel, which focuses on fixed-price 'auctions', which aim to beat the high street. In March 2013, the website got replaced by the official website for Bid Plus until the channel's closure.

=== Matinee Movies ===
Matinee Movies was a part-time movie channel owned by Sit-Up Ltd. It was then on Sky channel 336 and ran daily from 9 am to 9 pm. The last hour of the channel was occupied by some of Sit-Up's shopping auctions, such as Speed Auction TV.

The channel was aimed at families, showing classic and rare black & white British films such as Love in Pawn and the Frankie Howerd bequest comedy A Touch of the Sun. Films on the channel were introduced by film critic Paul Ross. As an interlude, or at the start of the broadcast day, there were showings of a film magazine programme called Sprockets (not to be confused with the SNL sketches with Mike Myers).

In under a year, the channel and EPG slot was sold to Dolphin Television who rebranded it as a 24-hour channel called Movies4Men on 1 February 2006. Sit-Up have no involvement with this channel.

=== Bad Movies ===
Bad Movies was a part-time movie channel owned by Sit-Up Ltd. It was then on Sky channel 339 and ran daily from 9 pm to 9 am. The first three hours however showed Sit-Up's shopping auctions, so Bad Movies content did not actually appear until midnight.

The channel was aimed at a young adult audience, showing a variety of cinematic "turkeys", though some of the content was increasingly from matinee movies, especially after 5am. Films included Tomboy starring Betsy Russell, Glen and Randa, Plan 9 from Outer Space and Revenge of the Cheerleaders starring David Hasselhoff. The channel also featured introductions by Paul Ross and episodes of Sprockets.

As per Matinee Movies, the channel and EPG slot was also sold to Dolphin Television who rebranded it as a 24-hour channel called ACTIONMAX (later rebranded as Movies4Men 2) on 1 February 2006. Sit-Up have no involvement with this channel.

=== Screenshop ===
Screenshop was an infomercial-based shopping channel. A deal in July 2004 meant that Vector Direct began to broadcast their presentations exclusively on the channel, this led to the channel being stripped of its identity. In 2005, it began to broadcast under Vector Direct's own band 'TV Warehouse'.

A second channel, Screenshop 2, ran until 29 April 2012. It broadcast during Speed Auction's downtime of 01:30 to 07:30 each day on Sky channel 680.

Screenshop also broadcast during the hours of 01:30 to 07:45 during Bid Shopping's downtime on its other channels, Bid and Price Drop.
