= Ideal World =

British free-to-view shopping channel

- Ideal World company logo
- Country: United Kingdom
- Broadcast area: United Kingdom, Ireland

Programming
- Picture format: 1080i (HDTV)

Ownership
- Owner: TJC (Previously: Ideal World Ltd; Kroll Advisory Ltd. during administration); Gemporia Craft; Shop Unlimited
- Sister channels: Shop LC; QVC UK hobby create and craft TV; HobbyMaker

History
- Launched: 17 April 2000; 26 years ago (original); 29 September 2023; 3 years ago (relaunch)

Links
- Website: idealworld.tv

Availability

Terrestrial
- Freeview: Channel 51

Ideal World is a British TV shopping channel, broadcasting on DTT, satellite and online, with transactional websites, previously hosted from studios in Peterborough. It is now owned by TJC and broadcast from their offices in Staines (recently relocated from premises in Feltham), following Ideal World Limited's administration in 2023, with some presenters and production staff from the former Ideal World Limited continuing.

== History ==
Ideal World had its origins in the 1980s as a mail order company selling products via national press adverts and consumer exhibitions. The company was then called Wrightway Marketing and was run by Paul Wright and his business partner Val Kaye. They decided to move into television home shopping, and launched Ideal World on 17 April 2000 on digital satellite from studios in Peterborough.

Ideal World originally had Steve Whatley, Paul Lavers and Debbie Flint as the three main faces of the channel. Tony Blackburn also presented slots on the channel. Mark Thatcher was installed as Head of Production.

On 6 March 2001, the facility at Peterborough was completely destroyed by fire. The channel was back broadcasting within weeks from various temporary facilities whilst the main building was rebuilt, it was not fully operational again until September 2002.

On 18 April 2003, Ideal World's first sister channel Create and Craft was launched and on 1 January 2004 Ideal Vitality started broadcasting. This was originally a channel from Goldshield, "Goldshield Vitality", for which Ideal Shopping Direct provided the studio recording and broadcast facilities. However, by the end of 2005 Goldshield pulled out of the venture. Ideal Shopping then broadcast a similar channel focusing on health and beauty products from Ideal's range, under the 'Vitality' name. Ideal Vitality was then wound down and replaced with highlights from past Ideal World shows, the channel being renamed on the Sky EPG as Ideal World 2. Ideal World 3, then followed, repeating Ideal World 2 shows.

On 23 April 2004, Ideal World began broadcasting on Freeview on Channel 22, a position it retained until 19 January 2022 when the channel traded places with another shopping TV channel, 'TJC', moving in the process to Channel 50. A week later, a Freeview re-shuffle moved the channel to number 51 on the EPG.

Jewellery Vault, a falling-auction style jewellery channel was launched on 1 July 2005 broadcasting live 5pm-1am and subsequently closed in July 2006 due to it not covering its operating costs.

On 3 March 2010, Ideal World 2 was renamed Ideal Extra and Ideal World 3 was renamed Ideal & More. On the same day, Ideal Extra launched on Freeview.

In 2011, the company was delisted from the AIM stock market, after acquisition by Village Ventures' investment fund, Inflexion Private Equity. The company was subsequently sold to The Blackstone Group, in 2015.

In May 2013, Ideal World became the subject of a BBC Watchdog investigation after viewer complaints about non-delivery of goods and allegedly poor quality of some products. Customers also alleged that complaints to Ideal World customer services either went unanswered or were not satisfactory. The Watchdog investigation followed claims by the Daily Mirror online that complaints about Ideal World submitted to its blog had "passed the 100 mark". Ideal World was acquired by Aurelius Group, in July 2018, Aurelius originally owned Bid shopping and its subsidiary, Bid tv, between 2009 and 2013.

=== Ideal World on ITV and STV ===
On 1 August 2019, Ideal World and Create and Craft started to simulcast live broadcasts on ITV (and UTV) between midnight or thereafter until 3am, replacing Jackpot247. In September 2021, Ideal World started simulcasting on STV at the same time as ITV, meaning Ideal World was broadcast nightly across the whole ITV network for the first time.

=== CCXTV ===
CCXTV was launched by Ideal Shopping Direct Ltd on 15 April 2020 as an entertainment channel and took over Create and Craft's Freeview LCN 23, broadcasting from 0700h until 2200h, with a schedule of imports and re-runs of shows like The Bold and The Beautiful, Never the Twain and Hot in Cleveland. The channel was sold to UKTV in October 2020. On 7 December 2020, CCXTV was moved to Freeview LCN 73 and UKTV's Dave Ja Vu was moved from Freeview LCN 79 to the vacated LCN 23.

CCXTV was discontinued on Freeview on 30 January 2021.

=== Sale of Create and Craft ===
In January 2022 it was announced that the Create and Craft arm of the business would be sold to Hochanda Global Limited, owners of The Craft Store TV channel (formerly known as HOCHANDA). Between then and 24 February 2022, Create and Craft was absorbed into The Craft Store's business with both channels running concurrently under the same ownership. On 25 February, Create & Craft's merge was complete by moving the channel into The Craft Store's slot on Freeview (channel 85). In preparation for the change of ownership, the former The Craft Store broadcast on LCN 85 was relabelled as 'Create & Craft' and the prior Create & Craft at 95, which remained under the control of Ideal World, was relabelled 'Craft Extra': the channels continued to relay their pre-existing output until the official handover date of 25 February, when Hochanda began broadcasting under the Create & Craft name on Freeview 85 in SD, and in on the former Create & Craft channel slots on satellite and cable. Following the completion of the merger, the Craft Extra-branded channel on Freeview 95 switched to a static video slate reading "Be back soon, please stand by, thank you"; having remained in place for four months with no programme content, the "Craft Extra' placeholder slate was removed from DTT in June 2022. The previous Craft Extra channel on satellite – previously Ideal World 3/Ideal & More – was retained by Ideal Shopping and closed without replacement, with a new Craft Extra created by Hochanda Global using the former Craft Store/Hochanda SD channel slot on Sky and Freesat. The latterday Craft Extra was removed from the Freesat guide in April 2023, remaining available on Sky.

HOCHANDA Global Limited announced intentions to use The Craft Store's name only for parts of their online business.

In February 2022, Ideal World was sold by asset management firm Aurelius Equity Opportunities to entrepreneur Hamish Morjaria. To facilitate the full closure of the company, the Deramores knitting arm sold its stock to LoveCrafts and subsequently closed down; iKan Papercrafts was put into administration due to having no buyer, and the resultant, now void 'shell' of Ideal Shopping Direct Limited was put into administration.

=== Suspension and relaunch ===
On 3 June 2023, Ideal World was removed from Virgin Media UK, although no reason was given for its removal. On 30 June 2023, it was announced that Ideal World was put up for sale by Kroll under the alias "Project Graystone", with the channel saying that they owe "hundreds of thousands [of pounds]" to suppliers.

On 3 July at 15:00, the channels (Ideal World and Ideal Extra) began showing a test card mentioning that the channel had "temporarily suspended broadcasting". Staff have reportedly been told there are "several interested parties" in acquiring the business and the company is hoping to share further information. "Over the weekend, the actions of a few key trading partners has added to a recent difficult trading period and therefore we have taken the decision to suspend all trading with immediate effect", says a statement reportedly sent to its employees. The website was also shut down on the same day, displaying a similar message to the channel.

On 4 July, Sky removed Ideal World and Ideal Extra from its EPG due to inactivity rules, and a day later it was announced that Ideal World had been placed into administration, with the website being updated to mention as such. On 7 July, it was revealed by the parent company that a "slump in trade" had caused its collapse, with the channel's co-founder Paul Wright, blaming the COVID-19 pandemic and a "dramatic change in the market".

On 24 August 2023, Hochanda Global – the current owners of Create & Craft, run by the founders of Ideal World – launched Shop Extra, a part-time shopping channel, from their Oundle studios, taking on some former Ideal World on and off air staff. The new output broadcast from 4pm on the Shop Extra (formerly Craft Extra) channel on Sky and as an IPTV streamed channel under the red button on Freeview; a Shop Extra programming block within the main Create & Craft channel after 10pm allowed Freesat and Virgin Media users to view.

On 27 August the suspended broadcast test cards was replaced with a vertical colour bar test card, officially ending Ideal World's broadcasts.

On 23 September 2023, it was announced that TJC had acquired the rights to utilise the Ideal World brand, with intentions to revamp both the website and the Freeview channel. TJC intended to reintroduce Ideal World on Sky, and to replace TJC Beauty, which was at that point broadcast on Sky channel 668. The revamped Ideal World would function as an independent entity separate from the primary TJC service. This arrangement did not involve the rehiring of former Ideal World staff, who were now without employment. Some former Ideal World presenters found new opportunities, including positions at the newly launched Shop Extra TV channel, which was introduced by Create & Craft in August, but again lost their jobs with the closure of Shop Extra TV after very little time on air. According to a Sky staff member on the Sky Community forum, Ideal World was scheduled to replace TJC Beauty on 29 September.

On Monday 25 September it was announced that a 4 hour fashion show would launch at 8am every Monday.

On 8 December 2023, the channel returned to its former EPG slot on Virgin Media.

On 18 September 2025, Ideal World started broadcasting 24 hours on Freeview after previously being on-air from 7am to midnight.

== Create & Craft ==
Create & Craft was a section on Ideal World, which was spun off from Ideal World in 2003, becoming the first TV channel dedicated to arts and crafts in the United Kingdom. The channel was sold to Hochanda Global, a company set up by the founders of Ideal World, who ran two channels called Create & Craft (channel 673) and Craft Extra (channel 680) on Sky before being delisted on 21 October 2024. This was after many suppliers had decided not to work with Hochanda anymore after failing to be paid for goods and after Create & Craft had stopped taking orders from customers. On 4 October 2024, an Administrator was appointed to deal with the company, which resulted in the channel showing an on-screen message over repeats telling viewers not to call or place orders. On 25 October 2024, after a party pulled out of a planned sale; Hochanda was placed into administration with immediate effect, of which Create & Craft had officially ceased operations after the repeats ended on Freeview with a placeholder being put up instead. The former managing director of the company blamed the collapse on the removal of the winter fuel allowance. UK retailer Hobbycraft would later acquire the "Create & Craft" brand and its website domain name.
