= Vector Direct =

Ownership
- Owner: Vector Direct

History
- Launched: 25 November 2000; 25 years ago
- Closed: 17 September 2008; 17 years ago

Links
- Website: vectordirect.tv

Vector Direct was a direct response television company showing longform infomercials on the Freeview, Virgin Media cable service and Sky Digital platforms in the United Kingdom.

== Sources ==
- Vector Direct Home Page
