= QVC (British TV channel) =

British television channel

QVC UK

Programming
- Picture format: 576i (16:9 SDTV); 1080i (HDTV)

Ownership
- Owner: QVC Group
- Sister channels: QVC Beauty; QVC Style; QVC Extra; QVC+ (streaming service)

History
- Launched: 1 October 1993

Links
- Website: www.qvcuk.com

Availability

Terrestrial
- Freeview: Channel 16 (QVC); Channel 37 (QVC2)

QVC UK is a television shopping channel broadcast from the United Kingdom to the United Kingdom and Ireland. It was formed in 1993 when QVC, Inc. agreed to a deal with Sky TV to create a UK version of the US channel. "QVC – The Shopping Channel" first broadcast in the UK on 1 October 1993.

== History ==
The original US channel was founded in 1986 in West Chester, Pennsylvania by Joseph Segel. It grew into a multinational corporation, specialising in televised home shopping. It now broadcasts in five countries to 141 million consumers. The name is an initialism—standing for Quality, Value, Convenience. However, unlike in the US, the expansion of the initialism is no longer used on air in the UK.

The UK venture launched on 1 October 1993, becoming the UK's first full-time home shopping channel, and in 1998 the UK venture turned its first net profit (£12.5 million), against a loss of £228,000 in 1997. Originally 20% owned by Sky, it became a wholly owned subsidiary of the US broadcaster in 2004.

QVC UK ended its broadcasts on analogue satellite on 30 June 2001.

In 2008, QVC UK launched a multiscreen video service accessible via the interactive television layer, making three video streams available to Sky viewers via the red button:

- QVC Live
- QVC +1 (a time delayed service)
- Today's Special Value presentation

In February 2020, QVC UK had a whole new rebrand with a whole new logo.

On 15 April 2026, QVC Group warned that it was preparing to file for Chapter 11 bankruptcy as soon as the end of that day, citing steadily viewer declines and debt burdens. QVC Group plans to enter a prepackaged restructuring support agreement with its creditors and exit Chapter 11 bankruptcy within no later than 90 days, or by around July 2026. On April 16, QVC Group filed for Chapter 11 bankruptcy protection in the United States District Court for the Southern District of Texas with plans to reduce over $5 billion in long-term debt, which will allow for the company to continue operating while having over $1 billion in debt remaining.

=== QVC Beauty ===
On 26 October 2010, a second channel was launched in the UK, QVC Beauty, available to viewers of Freeview, Sky and Freesat.

The channel broadcasts from 4:00 am to 2:00 am daily on Freeview channel 35. 2:00 am QVC Beauty HD on Freeview channel 112 only broadcasts from 2:00 am to 4:00 am daily due to the channels over rating.

QVC Beauty HD ceased broadcasting on Freeview with the closure of the COM7 multiplex, followed by the SD version on 21 June 2023.

=== QVC HD, QVC Extra and QVC Style ===
QVC had planned to begin broadcasting in high-definition from September 2012, to be followed by the launch of two new 24-hour channels on Sky. On 11 February 2013 Sparkle TV and Twinkle TV launched on Sky. On 1 July 2013, Twinkle TV was renamed QVC Style. Sparkle TV became QVC Extra on 12 August 2013, with both channels added to Freesat. The following day saw the channels relaunch with availability expanded to Freeview via the connected red button on QVC Beauty. In July 2014, QVC Extra launched on Freeview channel 57, but closed in 2015, while QVC Style launched on Freeview channel 36 in August 2016, replacing QVC +1. QVC Style changed its hours to 2:00 am to 4:00 am on 31 March 2020, allowing QVC Beauty to extend its hours. On 21 April 2015, QVC +1 HD launched on Freeview channel 111, becoming the second high-definition timeshift service in the UK (after Channel 4 +1 HD). From 2016 to 2018, QVC Extra was temporarily rebranded as QVC Christmas but returned on 24 September 2026. QVC Extra launched on Virgin Media on 27 July 2021. QVC HD ceased broadcasting on Freeview with the closure of the COM7 multiplex. QVC HD was later launched on Freesat and Sky in April 2022.

QVC Style ceased broadcasting on Freeview on 21 June 2023, though it continues on other platforms.

=== QVC Active ===
QVC Active was an interactive television service made accessible using the red button on QVC UK's cable, Sky and digital terrestrial services. Across each enhanced television platform, QVC provided information including a 24-hour TV Guide, bestselling products of that day and an ability for the viewer to interact with QVC UK's inventory. Customers viewing the Sky and cable TV platforms could buy products using their set-top box. On 13 August 2013, QVC Active closed as a result of more customers using mobile devices for ordering.

=== QVC2 ===
The UK version of QVC2 launched exclusively on Freeview on 21 June 2023, replacing QVC Beauty and QVC Style. On other platforms QVC Beauty and QVC Style continue as separate services.

The structure of the QVC channels in the UK is different than in the US, so the role that QVC2 plays is somewhat different. QVC2 in the US shows repeats of QVC's programming, while QVC2 in the UK shows fashion, beauty, home, and garden-related programmes.

== Operation in the UK ==
QVC UK operates from two main sites. From launch until June 2012, its headquarters and broadcasting facilities were at Marco Polo House, the former British Satellite Broadcasting headquarters in Battersea, London. These operations then moved to Chiswick Park, a 'campus'-style development on the site of a former derelict London Transport bus depot in West London. Its call centre and distribution warehouse is located in Kirkby, Knowsley, in Merseyside. These facilities were moved in 1998 from Liverpool's Harrington Dock. The company also had outlet stores in Warrington and Shrewsbury, however the Shrewsbury store closed permanently in 2020, leaving the Warrington store as the company's only physical outlet.

In June 2011, it was reported that QVC UK had begun carrying out trials of 3D broadcasting. This was merely an experiment, a spokesperson said.

The channel broadcasts live from 9:00 am to 11:00 pm, with the remaining hours being repeated content. QVC UK claims a market penetration of 15.4 million homes on cable, satellite, and digital terrestrial TV. The Astra 2E footprint also takes in much of Western Europe. Retail sales for the year 2008 reached £360+ million.

== Products ==
QVC organises its product range into nine distinct categories:

- Beauty
- Fashion
- Shoes & Accessories
- Jewellery
- Home & Kitchen
- Electronics
- Garden & Leisure
- Health & Wellbeing
- Gifts

QVC also stock a wide range of Christmas Products, with Christmas items available from 25 July when the Channel Celebrates "Christmas in July".

== Current presenters ==
- Simon Biagi
- Charlie Brook
- Ophelia Dennis
- Chloe Everton
- Debbie Flint
- Dale Franklin
- Jill Franks
- Kathryn Goldsmith
- Pipa Gordon
- Will Gowing
- Jilly Halliday
- Catherine Huntley
- Jackie Kabler
- Alex Kramer
- Eilidh Nairn
- Katy Pullinger
- Julia Roberts
- Craig Rowe
- Victoria Fitz-Gerald
- Alison Young (beauty expert)
- Miceal Murphy

== Regular current guests ==
- Rylan Clark
- Amanda Holden
- Richard Jackson
- Ruth Langsford
- Cait Penfold
- Michael Perry
- Andi Peters
- Rosa Speyer
- Rick Stein
- Gok Wan
- Lee Hohbein
- Gail Samways
- James Murden
- Debra Leigh
- Leanne Stott
- Julien MacDonald
- Beverley Cressman
- Gill Gauntlett
- Lorna Ko
- Anne Dorrington
- Mark Lane
- Lucy Piper
- Shaun Ryan
- Tess Daly
- Dannii Minogue

== Past presenters ==
- Kara Baker
- Julian Ballantyne
- Sophia Barnes
- Jon Briggs
- Suzanne Evett
- Harry Greene
- Debbie Greenwood
- Anthony Heywood
- Katy John
- Paul Lavers
- Rob Locke
- Claudia Sylvester
- Kara Tritton
- Steve Whatley
- Carmel Thomas
- Anna Cookson
- Michaela Hyde
- Tim Goodwin
- Claire Sutton
- Kathy Tayler
- Alison Keenan
- Anne Dawson
