= Shop at Bid =

British TV channel

- Country: United Kingdom
- Broadcast area: United Kingdom

Programming
- Picture format: 16:9, 576i (SDTV)

Ownership
- Owner: Bid Shopping
- Sister channels: Price Drop

History
- Launched: 5 October 2000
- Closed: 17 April 2014
- Former names: Bid-Up.TV (2000–2005); Bid TV (2005–2011); Bid (2011–2014)

Availability (at time of closure)

Terrestrial
- Freeview: Channel 23

Shop at Bid was a British television shopping channel that ran daily auctions and later fixed price demonstrations. It was the world's first channel of its kind. It launched as Bid-Up.tv. The channel was owned by Bid Shopping.

== History ==
=== Bid-Up.TV (2000–2005) ===
The channel was launched by Sit-Up Shopping in October 2000. It originally broadcast 12 hours a day, much of which was pre-recorded, with auction graphics overlaid so people could bid. Bid later aired live broadcasts almost 18 hours a day, with recorded TV Shopping Network presentations during its downtime.

The channel amassed a cult-following as it spread across digital platforms. This popularity can be partly attributed to the use of David Dickinson, ex-presenter of the BBC television series Bargain Hunt, in various television advertising campaigns.

In November 2001, Bid-Up launched on NTL.

In June 2003, Sit-Up Shopping launched sister channel Price-Drop TV.

In April 2004, a new system for bidding known as Best Bidding was introduced. All bids acted as proxy bidding, so instead of the bidder choosing the amount, the computer automatically entered an upto amount that would not exceed the value specified. At the end of the auction, everyone paid the same price as indicated in the on-screen "auction arrow", thus amounting to a uniform price auction.

Each item was advertised with a specific quantity, and a bid-up from price triangle. Customers phoned in and bid up from the particular amount. The quantity was used to determine which customers 'won' the auction. For example, if 50 items were available, then the top 50 bidders would win the auction.

In August 2004, the channel had an "Auction Choice" month, during which they featured both rising and falling price auction hours. The falling price auctions continued after this month and are now the only common auction format on the channel.

Prior to December 2004, each item also had a "guide price", described as the manufacturer's recommended retail price or an average of prices from other retailers. However, these were removed following the collapse of shopping channel Auction World.tv, which was criticised for advertising misleading guide prices.

=== Bid TV (2005–2011) ===
Bid TV logo used from 21 January 2005 until 1 August 2011.

On 21 January 2005, the channel was rebranded as Bid TV to reflect the fact that more of its auctions followed the Price-Drop TV format, meaning that bidders were only rarely bidding "up". Bid TV no longer offered rising-price auctions. A new graphic was added in October 2005 to show the start price of falling price auctions.

When the channel originally launched, one of the most popular features was the relaxed style in which the presenters and assistants interacted with each other. For instance, the presenter whose shift was starting would come on air for the last few minutes of the previous presenter's shift. However, although still relaxed, this presenter interaction seems to have been stopped with the launch of Bid TV. Despite the fact that they no longer used an auction hall theme, the presenters exclusively refer to the products they sell as 'lots' and to their customers as 'bidders'. When referring to the next item to be sold the presenters and assistants would say "Closing next..."

In early 2006 the website was overhauled in an attempt to increase its user-friendliness and overall aesthetic appeal. Its new design was inspired by that of eBay, the world's most popular auction website, in an attempt to capitalise on its popularity. On 10 May, the on-screen graphics were changed so that products are now sold in pounds and pence, as opposed to just pounds, a change previously incorporated into Price-Drop TV. In August, a new graphic was introduced, showing Bid TV's website address and a falling arrow. This was shown as soon as the assistant has shown what is coming up next, and introduces the presenter.

In August 2007, they began to sell products with choices. On certain products (often bedding or clothes) the customer was able to choose the size or colour by pressing a telephone button. The graphics for these auctions are different, showing the start price, the current price, the quantity of the 'main' choice and a list of options. When the main choice item is sold out, the price is locked and is what everyone pays regardless of their bid. If another choice is selling faster, then 'limited' appears next to its name and the name vanishes when it sells out.

As a celebration for Bid TV's 7th birthday, in September and October 2007, the channel held a six weekend megadrop promotion where at least one product each hour between 8pm on Friday and 1am on Sunday was sold for £1 plus postage. They have run similar promotions in the past, but this was the first time that Bid TV used the Price-Drop TV name Megadrop.

In January 2008 In order to promote the sister channels of Bid TV, Price-Drop TV and Speed-Auction TV, a small preview of what was on sale on each channel was displayed before each auction began. On 21 June, the channel removed the former graphic displaying the channel name, and replaced this with the web address. In September all three Sit-Up channels removed start-prices from their graphics. However, they still appeared on the websites.

==== 10th birthday ====
On 5 October 2010, Bid TV celebrated its 10th birthday. As part of the celebrations and further expansion of the Sit-Up Shopping channels, a £5 Million Warehouse Clearance event took place from 16 August 2010 for six weeks, following the announcement that the company is relocating its warehouse in Tamworth to a larger one. The studios of all three channels received new looks from 6 October 2010. On 3 October host Peter Simon stated that the studio was to be demolished in a few hours time, and that live broadcast would be filmed from the Speed Auction TV studio (complete with yellow/black striped construction tape and brown dust-sheets as a backdrop this was to fit in with the theme of Bid TV's studio being under construction) until the new studio was ready to broadcast in on 6 October.

On 6 October, Bid TV continued to celebrate. The broadcast carried on as usual in the temporary studio (that was normally used for Speed Auction TV), switching to the new look studio from 6pm onwards. The on-screen graphics were replaced.

=== Bid (2011–2014) ===
Bid logo used from 1 August 2011 until 10 March 2014.

On 1 August 2011, 'Bid TV' changed its name to 'Bid' dropping the 'TV' part of their name. Along with the new name, new buying graphics were introduced on all Bid Shopping channels and new idents compromising of 3D products flying around the new logo designs were shown. The new design was created to make buying easier for the viewer. Multi-buy was introduced on certain products where the viewer can select to buy more than one product at the same time (P&P is still applied to each item). Bid in this form ended on 10 March.

=== Shop at Bid and closure (2014) ===
On 10 March 2014, Bid rebranded into 'Shop at Bid' - a new format including a fixed price dynamic that ended the falling price approach. A new premium rate number was introduced which cost 20p per minute as opposed to the previous £1.53 (per call). The buying process changed to allow viewers to speak to an advisor after purchase and did not require a call back.

This change lasted just over one month. On 17 April 2014, Bid Shopping, the channel's owner, went into administration; Shop at Bid and its sister channel Price Drop were closed down with immediate effect, costing 229 jobs. Websites were pulled offline, and a technical fault card appeared on the channels. On 23 April 2014, the Bid and Price Drop websites were updated and the channels were pulled from Virgin Media. The channels were removed from Freeview and Sky on 25 April 2014. On Virgin Media and Sky, Shop At Bid's EPG is blank.

== Criticisms ==
For much of its life Bid used a premium phone rate charge of £1.53 per call for bidding. Additionally, shipping and handling cost at least £7.99 for all items (as mentioned on-screen). Thus, each item cost at least £9.52 more than the most prominently displayed price. Customers were also able to place bids for items on the website (providing they were registered) so as to avoid the initial £1.53 charge, but not postage and packaging.

The ASA upheld complaints against Bid on two separate occasions. In the most serious case, they ruled that Bid TV had overestimated the guide price of £1,700 for "Black Agate Globes"; "Bid-Up could only provide proof of one supplier that may have sold the globe for £1,700". In fact, one supplier who Bid TV claimed sold the item for £1,700 actually offered to sell the item for £265 with most companies offering the globe for considerably less than £1,700: "between £250 and £500". Bid was therefore found in breach of ASA broadcasting codes for providing inaccurate pricing.

In 2009, Bid TV attracted attention in the press and on internet forums following an incident where the same host, Paul Evers, appeared on both Bid TV and Price-Drop TV at the same time, fronting two different auctions, both apparently 'live'. Sit-Up's chief executive Ian Percival explained the situation by saying "We are experimenting by using recorded video of a sale but playing it out with a live auction. The price and the quantity are live - as shown on the graphics - but the video is pre-recorded. We've only done it a couple of times before." A subsequent press report stated that these recorded auctions would be scrapped following complaints and a possible ASA investigation. Sit-Up's head of presentation Andy Hodgson said "We have done it a couple of times and have no firm plans to do it again." However, Sit-Up's channels have in fact routinely featured these so-called "graphic led" pre-recorded auctions since launch. A mix-up in one of these auctions in 2002 led to a complaint being upheld by the ITC.

On 21 May 2013, it was announced that the Advertising Standards Authority (ASA) had referred Sit-Up Limited, who operate Bid to Ofcom for consideration of statutory sanctions following repeated breaches of the UK Code of Broadcast Advertising. Ofcom confirmed that it had accepted the referral. Since January 2012, 33 ASA cases ruled against Sit-Up Limited. The two main types of problem were misleading pricing claims and misleading product descriptions.

== Past presenters ==
- Nana Akua
- Paul Becque
- Marina Berry (2008–2014)
- Kevin Duala
- Elisa Foreman
- Adam Freeman
- Nicola George
- Keith Harris (2005–2006)
- Chris Haywood (voiceover)
- Justin Hazell
- Andy Hodgson
- Alex Lovell (October 2000–2001)
- Caroline Lyndsay
- Paul Ross
- Mike Mason
- Mark Ryes
- Greg Scott
- Adele Sica
- Peter Simon
- Mike Smith
- Claire Stuart

== See also ==
- Bid Plus
- Bid Shopping
- Price Drop
