= Timeline of TV-am =

This is a timeline of the British breakfast television station TV-am which provided the ITV nationwide breakfast-time service from 1983 to 1992.

== 1980s ==
- 1980
  - 24 January – The Independent Broadcasting Authority announces that in the next ITV franchising round it will offer a national licence for breakfast television.
  - 28 December – The IBA announces that TV-am has been awarded the contract to provide ITV with a breakfast television service. It beat off seven other bids for the franchise, to begin transmission in June 1983 so as to avoid clashing with the launch of Channel 4 which went on air in November 1982.
- 1981
  - March – TV-am chooses as its studios a former car showroom which is renovated to create the Breakfast Television Centre.
- 1982
  - No events.
- 1983
  - 1 February – TV-am launches on ITV with Daybreak and Good Morning Britain. It is beaten to air by two weeks by the BBC's breakfast service Breakfast Time. The service operates seven days a week between 6am to 9:15am.
  - 28 February – TV-am cuts its Daybreak programme to thirty minutes, allowing Good Morning Britain to begin half an hour earlier at 6:30am. Original Daybreak presenters Robert Kee and Angela Rippon are both replaced with Gavin Scott (weekdays) and Lynda Barry (weekends).
  - 18 March – Amid falling ratings and mounting pressure from investors, Peter Jay steps down as TV-am's Chief Executive allowing Jonathan Aitken to take on the role.
  - 1 April – Roland Rat makes his first appearance on TV-am. Created by David Claridge and launched by TV-am Children's editor Anne Wood to entertain younger viewers during the Easter holidays, Roland is generally regarded as TV-am's saviour, being described as "the only rat to join a sinking ship".
  - 12 April – Timothy Aitken succeeds his cousin Jonathan as Chief Executive of TV-am due to the IBA rules regarding MPs operating a television station.
  - 19 April – Angela Rippon and Anna Ford are axed from TV-am.
  - 29 April – Michael Parkinson is appointed to TV-am's board of directors.
  - April – Greg Dyke joins as Editor-in-Chief.
  - 23 May
    - The 10-minute interval between the end of TV-am and the start of the regional ITV franchises at 9:25am ends because the switch of the broadcast signals from TV-am to each regional ITV franchise becomes an automatic process. The IBA extends TV-am's hours to 9:25am to allow for continuous programming.
    - TV-am's refreshed schedule begins. Programming begins at the later time of 6:25 am on weekdays, with a later start at the weekend. Daybreak is axed, with Good Morning Britain now the sole weekday programme. The changes prove to be successful as by the end of its first week, TV-am's ratings had doubled to 200,000.
  - June – Nick Owen and Anne Diamond start joint-presenting Good Morning Britain.
  - August – TV-am has a further ratings success when it employs Chris Tarrant to host a series of outside broadcasts from seaside resorts across the UK.
  - September – TV-am finally joined the television contractors’ associations, which gave the addition benefit of providing cross-promotional content between the 15 regional ITV companies and TV-am.
- 1984
  - Australian business tycoon Kerry Packer takes a substantial minority interest in the company and in early May he appoints his own Chief Executive, Bruce Gyngell, to help make the company financially viable. Greg Dyke leaves with a few weeks of the appointment to take a new position with TVS. Ten days later, general manager Michael Moor also left the station.
  - 12 October – The cost-cutting at TV-am is brought sharply into focus in its coverage of the Brighton hotel bombing. The night before the terrorist attack, TV-am sent the production team home as it could not afford to pay for hotel rooms. When the blast occurred in the early hours, the BBC and ITN provided immediate coverage. TV-am's response was limited to a caption of reporter John Stapleton reporting over the phone. Trade union agreements at the time meant that technical staff at the local ITV station TVS could not provide cover for another commercial television company and TV-am's previous conflicts with ITN meant that the latter would not share its footage. The whole affair earned the company a severe rebuke from the IBA who told them to invest and improve its news coverage or it would lose its licence.
  - 13 October – The first edition of children's programme Wide Awake Club is broadcast. It replaces Data Run] and Rub-a-Dub-Tub. Also ending is Summertime filler SPLAT. The changes are part of its cost-cutting programme.
- 1985
  - 3 January – TV-am expands its broadcasting hours. Weekday programmes begin ten minutes earlier at 6:15am and weekend programmes begin at 6:55am. Programming on bank holidays starts at 7am.
  - 14 September – Wide Awake Club is extended and now runs for two hours, from 7:30am until 9:25am.
  - 3 October – Roland Rat transfers to the BBC. Commenting on the move, he says, "I saved TV-am and now I'm here to save the BBC."
  - October – Following Roland Rat's move to the BBC, TV-am launches a new children's programme for school holiday weekdays, a spin-off from Wide Awake Club called Wacaday.
- 1986
  - August – After more than three years, the presenting partnership of Nick Owen and Anne Diamond ends when Nick leaves TV-am for ITV Sport.
- 1987
  - For a short period in 1987, prior to the start of 24-hour broadcasting on ITV, a selection of teletext pages are broadcast in-vision prior to the start of TV-am. These pages mostly consisted of news and information about TV-am.
  - July – TV-am reintroduces a weekday news programme, GMB Newshour, airing from the start of programmes until 7am. Good Morning Britain now broadcasts between 7am and 9am.
  - 7 September – TV-am recommences broadcasting each day from 6am. This is the first time since its launch in 1983 that TV-am has transmitted throughout its allocated broadcast hours.
  - 23 November – The TV-am strike begins after members of the technicians union the ACTT walk out in a dispute over the station's ‘Caring Christmas Campaign’. What is meant to be a 24-hour stoppage continues for several months when staff are locked out by Managing Director Bruce Gyngell. TV-am is unable to broadcast Good Morning Britain and the regular format is replaced with shows such as Flipper, Batman and Happy Days.
  - 7 December – A skeleton service begins that sees non-technical staff operating cameras and Gyngell himself directing proceedings. This enables TV-am to broadcast a 30-minute live segment each morning.
  - 14 December – TV-am extends its live broadcasting to an hour a day.
- 1988
  - 14 January – Talks between TV-am's management and the ACTT begin, aimed at resolving the ongoing strike.
  - 25–29 January – TV-am airs a week of live broadcasts from Sydney to celebrate Australia's bicentenary and featured Anne Diamond and Mike Morris.
  - 1 February
    - TV-am celebrates its fifth birthday, with Anne Diamond joined by Richard Keys, Gyles Brandreth, Su Pollard and Jimmy Greaves. It is the first time TV-am has been able to get its daily output down to an hour of pre-recorded material since the beginning of the strike. However, the station continues to air imports of old American shows for several more months.
    - The deadline on which the ACTT must accept TV-am's "Ten Point Plan" aimed at resolving the strike. However, the plan is rejected by a ballot and the union refuses to resume negotiations.
  - 16 February – TV-am Managing Director Bruce Gyngell sacks the station's locked out staff and calls a meeting of its remaining employees the following morning to announce that the ACTT will never again organise itself at TV-am's studios. His decision fails to resolve the crisis, however, as picketing continues and the quality of its output remains unchanged.
  - 30 May – ITV broadcasts Telethon '88. The ACTT had asked its members to boycott the event and fearful of sparking a nationwide dispute, TV-am's acting managing director, Adrian Moore, allows ITV to use the early morning airtime. Consequently, TV-am does not broadcast on this day.
  - July – Stephen Barden is appointed TV-am's new Managing Editor. With the station facing criticism from the IBA over the quality of its output, he acts quickly to improve matters. Repeats of imported American programmes finally come to an end, new programming launches and programmes such as Frost on Sunday (off air since the strike began) are restored.
  - 19 August – Following concerns about the quality of TV-am's programming, an emergency meeting of the IBA considers whether to review the station's franchise in early 1989. However, it ultimately decided not to proceed with the review since the next franchise round is approaching and the IBA feels the success of both organisations is mutually exclusive.
  - 1 November – Having decided to step down from her presenting role on TV-am, Anne Diamond makes her final regular appearance on the station.
  - GMB Newshour is relaunched as The Morning Programme.
- 1989
  - April – Wide Awake Club is relaunched as WAC 90.

== 1990s ==
- 1990
  - June – WAC 90 ends and is replaced by Hey, Hey, it's Saturday!.
- 1991
  - September – Hey, Hey, it's Saturday! is axed. It is replaced the following week by TV Mayhem.
  - October – TV-am looks to branch out into radio when it bids with Virgin Communications Ltd to operate the UK's second Independent National Radio station.
  - 16 October – The ITC announces the results of the franchise round. Following the Broadcasting Act 1990, the ITC had to conduct a franchise auction whereby contracts would be given to the highest bidder, subject to fulfilling a programming ‘quality threshold.’ TV-am loses the national breakfast television franchise to Sunrise Television, later to be known as GMTV, owing to them not being the highest bidder.
  - November – Following the loss of its franchise, TV-am scraps all of its original children's programming, replacing it with cartoons aired under the branding Cartoon World.
- 1992
  - February – Ahead of the loss of its franchise, TV-am closes its in-house news service and contracts it out to Sky News for a one-off payment. Other original programming, especially children's programming, is also wound down.
  - April – Independent Music Radio, the consortium which TV-am is part of, is awarded the second Independent National Radio licence.
  - June – David Frost leaves. His final interviewee is Margaret Thatcher whose legislation was responsible for TV-am losing its licence.
  - 18 December – Ahead of TV-am's closure, the final edition of After Nine is aired.
  - 31 December – At 9:25am, TV-am ends its final broadcast after 9 years and 10 months on air.
- 1993
  - 1 January – TV-am's successor GMTV begins broadcasting at 6am.
  - March – TV-am sells its stake in forthcoming national commercial radio station Virgin 1215 to Apax Partners, JP Morgan Investment Corporation and David Frost.
  - August – TV-am plc becomes Crockfords plc, since 1995 known as Capital Corporation Ltd, a gambling company which is currently non-trading.

== See also ==
- Timeline of breakfast television in the United Kingdom
- History of ITV
