= Timeline of breakfast television in the United Kingdom =

This is a timeline of the history of breakfast television in the United Kingdom.

== 1970s ==
- 1973
  - 18 May – The UK's first ever regular breakfast television programme is broadcast. It airs on The Bristol Channel via that city's cable system. It airs between 7:30am and 8:15am and is then repeated twice.
- 1974
  - 30 January – BBC2 shows the first early morning Open University programming, airing between 6:40am and 7:30am.
- 1975
  - No events.
- 1976
  - 4 February – Early morning programming from the Open University begins on BBC1, with Electrons in motion airing at 7:05am.
- 1977
  - 28 March–27 May – Yorkshire Television and Tyne Tees Television carry out a nine-week breakfast television experiment. Airing at 8:30am, YTV's programme is called Good Morning Calendar and Tyne Tees' programme is called Good Morning North. They air six years before the launch of full-time breakfast television in the UK.
- 1978
  - No events.
- 1979
  - No events.

== 1980s ==
- 1980
  - 24 January – The Independent Broadcasting Authority announces that in the next ITV franchise round it will offer a national licence for breakfast television.
  - 1 December – BBC Scotland carries out a one-week experiment in breakfast television. It is a simulcast of BBC Radio Scotland's breakfast show Good Morning Scotland.
  - 28 December – The IBA announces the results of the 1980 franchise round, which includes the winner of a national franchise to provide a breakfast television service on ITV. TV-am is awarded the contract to begin broadcasting in 1983.
- 1981
  - March – TV-am purchases a former car showroom in Camden as its headquarters. The building is subsequently renovated to create the Breakfast Television Centre.
- 1982
  - 3–9 October – As part of its coverage of the 1982 Commonwealth Games, the BBC broadcasts a two-hour breakfast programme Breakfast with Brisbane. It includes regular news summaries and comes three months ahead of the launch of Breakfast Time.
- 1983
  - 17 January – At 6:30am, Britain's first-ever breakfast television show, Breakfast Time, launches on BBC1.
  - 1 February – TV-am launches on ITV, with Daybreak and Good Morning Britain.
  - 14 February – Following the launch of Breakfast Time, the Open University (OU) programmes previously shown on BBC1 on weekday mornings move to BBC2, resulting in the weekday early morning OU transmission on BBC2 being extended from 1 hour 15 minutes to 2 hours 5 minutes. BBC1 continues to broadcast early morning OU transmissions at the weekend until September 1992.
  - 28 February
    - TV-am cuts its Daybreak programme to thirty minutes, allowing Good Morning Britain to begin half an hour earlier. Original Daybreak presenters Robert Kee and Angela Rippon are both replaced, with Gavin Scott (Weekdays) and Lynda Barry (weekends).
    - BBC1 begins broadcasting a 30-minute Ceefax slot prior to the start of Breakfast Time. It is called Ceefax AM. It is first mentioned in the Radio Times on 21 March.
  - 18 March – Amid falling ratings and mounting pressure from investors, Peter Jay steps aside as TV-am's Chief Executive allowing Jonathan Aitken to take on the role.
  - 1 April – Roland Rat makes his first appearance on TV-am. Created by David Claridge and launched by TV-am Children's editor Anne Wood to entertain younger viewers during the Easter holidays, Roland is generally regarded as TV-am's saviour, being described as "the only rat to join a sinking ship".
  - 12 April – Timothy Aitken succeeds his cousin Jonathan as chief executive of TV-am due to the IBA rules regarding MPs operating a television station.
  - 19 April – Angela Rippon and Anna Ford are dismissed from TV-am.
  - 29 April – Michael Parkinson is appointed to TV-am's board of directors.
  - 23 May – TV-am's new look starts. Daybreak is axed, with Good Morning Britain now the sole weekday programme, beginning at 6:25am. Commander David Philpott is moved to weekends only, with Wincey Willis becoming the new weekday weather presenter.
- 1984
  - Bruce Gyngell is appointed as TV-am's chief executive. To make the company financially viable, he introduced cost-cutting measures which were brought sharply into focus in the Brighton hotel bombing. The night before the terrorist attack, TV-am sent the production team home as it could not afford to pay for hotel rooms and TV-am's response was limited to a caption of reporter John Stapleton reporting over the phone. Trade union agreements at the time meant that technical staff at the local ITV station TVS could not provide cover for another commercial television company, and TV-am's previous conflicts with ITN meant that the latter would not share its footage. The IBA told the company to invest and improve its news coverage, or it would lose its licence.
  - 4 August – The BBC airs its first weekend edition of Breakfast Time as part of its coverage of the 1984 Summer Olympic Games. For the duration of the Games, with the exception of news and weather, the programme was entirely devoted to Olympic coverage and the time difference meant that Olympic Breakfast Time was given over to highlights of the overnight action. Frank Bough presents the programme with David Icke providing "Olympic Action Summaries" at 7:05, 8:05 and 8:50. The weekend editions saw news summaries broadcast on the hour and is also the first time that the BBC has broadcast a full service of pre-lunchtime news bulletins at the weekend.
  - 13 October – TV-am launches a new Saturday morning children's series called the Wide Awake Club. The live programme replaces pre-recorded shows such as Data Run and SPLAT.
- 1985
  - 3 January – TV-am expands its broadcasting hours. Weekday programmes begin ten minutes earlier during the week, at 6:15am and weekend programmes begin at 6:55am.
  - 18 February – Breakfast Time moves to a later slot, now running between 6:50am and 9:20am. Consequently, Ceefax AM is now on air for an extra 20 minutes each day, from 6am until 6:50am.
  - TV-am launches After Nine. It is only broadcast during term time as children's programmes are shown during the school holidays.
  - 14 September – TV-am's Wide Awake Club is doubled in length, broadcasting for almost two hours from 7:30am until 9:25am.
  - 3 October – Roland Rat, the puppet rodent who saved an ailing TV-am transfers to the BBC. With only a week until October half term was due to start, TV-am launches Wacaday, a spin-off of the existing and successful Saturday morning programme, Wide Awake Club.
- 1986
  - 25 July – Selina Scott presents Breakfast Time for the final time.
  - 10 November – BBC1 revamps its breakfast programming. Breakfast Time is relaunched with a more formal news and current affairs format. It now begins at the later time of 7am. Prior to Breakfast Time, BBC1 starts showing The Flintstones at 6:30am, reducing Ceefax AM to a 30-minute broadcast.
- 1987
  - July – TV-am reintroduces a weekday news programme, GMB Newshour, airing initially from the start of programmes until 7am. Good Morning Britain now airs between 7am and 9am.
  - 7 September – TV-am recommences broadcasting each day from 6am. This is the first time since 1983 that TV-am has transmitted throughout its allocated broadcast hours.
  - 16 October – Following the Great Storm of 1987, electrical power to TV-am's studios is lost and an emergency programme has to be transmitted from facilities at Thames Television's Euston Road centre using reports from TV-am's own crews and those of ITN, TSW and TVS, while the BBC's Breakfast Time, which would usually come from Lime Grove, was unable to broadcast as the studios were without power, as was most of BBC Television Centre at Wood Lane. The early part of the programme was broadcast from the continuity suite at TV Centre usually used for Children's BBC presentation as this area had generator support, before a larger studio was able to be brought into use.
  - 23 November – The TV-am strike begins after members of the technicians' union the ACTT walk out in a dispute over the station's ‘Caring Christmas Campaign’. What is meant to be a 24-hour stoppage continues for several months when staff are locked out by Managing Director Bruce Gyngell. TV-am is unable to broadcast Good Morning Britain, replacing it with shows such as Flipper, Batman and Happy Days. By December, a skeleton service that sees non-technical staff operating cameras and Gyngell himself directing proceedings, begin to allow Good Morning Britain to start broadcasting again. The strikers are eventually sacked and replaced with non-union staff. Viewing figures remain high throughout the disruption, which continues well into 1988.
  - 7 December – TV-am is able to switch from airing 100% pre-recorded material with the introduction of a 30-minute live segment each morning presented by Anne Diamond.
  - 14 December – TV-am extends its live broadcasting to an hour a day.
  - 18 December – Frank Bough, who launched breakfast television on 17 January 1983, presents Breakfast Time for the final time.
- 1988
  - 14 January – Talks between TV-am's management and the ACTT begin aimed at resolving the ongoing strike.
  - 25–29 January – TV-am airs a week of live broadcasts from Sydney to celebrate Australia's bicentenary, and featuring Anne Diamond and Mike Morris.
  - 1 February
    - TV-am celebrates its fifth birthday, with Anne Diamond joined by Richard Keys, Gyles Brandreth, Su Pollard and Jimmy Greaves. It is the first time TV-am has been able to get its daily output down to an hour of pre-recorded material since the beginning of the strike. However, the station continues to air imports of old American shows for several more months.
    - The deadline on which the ACTT must accept TV-am's "Ten Point Plan" aimed at resolving the strike. However, the plan is rejected by a ballot and the union refuses to resume negotiations.
  - 16 February – TV-am Managing Director Bruce Gyngell sacks the station's locked out staff, and calls a meeting of its remaining employees the following morning to announce that the ACTT will never again organise itself at TV-am's studios. His decision fails to resolve the crisis, however, as picketing continues and the quality of its output remains unchanged.
  - 30 May – TV-am does not go on air, with its airtime instead taken up by coverage of ITV's Telethon '88. The ACTT had asked its members to boycott the programme on this date, and fearful of sparking a nationwide dispute, TV-am's acting managing director, Adrian Moore, allows ITV to use the early morning airtime.
  - July – Stephen Barden is appointed TV-am's new Managing Editor. With the station facing criticism from the IBA over the quality of its output, he acts quickly to improve matters. Repeats of imported American programmes finally come to an end. New programming is launched, and programmes such as Frost on Sunday (off air since the strike began) are restored.
  - 19 August – Following concerns about the quality of TV-am's programming, an emergency meeting of the IBA considers whether to review the station's franchise in early 1989. However, it is ultimately decided not to proceed with the review since the next franchise round is approaching, and the IBA feels the success of both organisations is mutually exclusive.
  - 17 September–2 October – Channel 4 broadcasts at breakfast for the first time as part of its coverage of the 1988 Summer Olympic Games and the BBC resurrects Olympic Breakfast Time for the duration on the event, and this includes the return of weekend editions which, like in 1984, also includes hourly news summaries.
  - 1 November – Having decided to step down from her presenting role on TV-am, Anne Diamond makes her final regular appearance on the station.
  - TV-am's GMB Newshour is relaunched as The Morning Programme.
- 1989
  - 6 February – Launch of the Sky News flagship breakfast programme Sky News Sunrise.
  - 3 April – Channel 4 launches its breakfast television show The Channel Four Daily. The programme is based heavily on news and current affairs, with segments focusing on sports, finance, lifestyles, arts and entertainment, and discussion.
  - April – The Wide Awake Club is renamed WAC '90. It is broadcast from Granada's studios in Manchester rather than from TV-am's London studios.
  - 15 September – Ceefax AM is broadcast for the final time.
  - 2 October – The BBC relaunches Breakfast Time as Breakfast News. The new programme adopts a rolling news format and starts 30 minutes earlier, at 6:30am. Most of the first 30 minutes is devoted to business news.
  - 22 November – Following the commencement of televised coverage of the House of Commons the previous day, BBC2 launches a breakfast round-up of yesterday's proceedings. This is preceded by the 8am bulletin from Breakfast News. Previously, the only BBC2 breakfast output was programmes from the Open University. OU programmes continue to be shown on BBC2 at breakfast, but in an earlier timeslot. The new programme line-up is completed by the introduction of the first peak-breakfast Pages from Ceefax broadcast with Ceefax shown between the end of the Open University transmissions, or from 7:30am when no OU programmes are broadcast.

== 1990s ==
- 1990
  - 2 January – The weekday 6am Ceefax slot returns to BBC1.
  - 17 April – The Channel Four Daily is revamped in a bid to attract more viewers. Some of the segments are changed and the programme starts 30 minutes later, at 6:30am.
  - July – Hey, Hey, it's Saturday! replaces Wac '90 as TV-am's flagship Saturday morning children's programme.
- 1991
  - 17 January–2 March – The Gulf War sees the broadcast of extra and extended news bulletins at breakfast. These include weekend summaries on the hour on BBC1 and a Saturday edition of The Channel Four Daily.
  - September – TV Mayhem replaces Hey, Hey, it's Saturday! as TV-am's Saturday morning children's programme.
  - 21 September – More than eight years after launching its weekday breakfast television service, the BBC launches a five-minute long weekend breakfast news bulletin. The Saturday bulletin is broadcast at 7:25am and on Sunday, it is shown at 9:10am.
  - 16 October – The ITV franchise auction sees TV-am losing the national breakfast television franchise to Sunrise Television, but as Sky News' breakfast programming also uses that name (and did so until 2019) Sky protested, resulting in a change of name to GMTV. As a result of this, TV-am immediately axes TV Mayhem and replaces it with Cartoon World which as the name suggests, only shows cartoons.
- 1992
  - February – TV-am closes its in-house news service and contracts out news bulletins to Sky News.
  - 25 September – Channel 4 airs the final Channel Four Daily. The news based breakfast television show was axed due to poor ratings.
  - 28 September – The Channel Four Daily's replacement, The Big Breakfast, launches. The programme takes a lighter tone and proves to be more popular with viewers.
  - 31 December – At 9:25am, TV-am ends its final broadcast after 9 years and 10 months on air.
- 1993
  - 1 January – Good Morning Television (GMTV) takes over the breakfast television franchise from TV-am. Among its programmes is Saturday Disney which overlaps past its 9:25am cut off time. It continues to be produced by Scottish Television which was one of the owners of GMTV at the time.
  - 3 January – Debut of Breakfast with Frost, a Sunday morning current affairs programme on BBC1 presented by David Frost.
  - 4 January – The BBC launches Business Breakfast as a 60-minute standalone programme. It had previously been part of Breakfast News. Consequently, the BBC's weekday breakfast programmes start half an hour earlier, at 6am and the early morning Ceefax transmission now runs for just 15 minutes, beginning at 5:45am.
- 1994
  - 17 October – BBC Scotland airs a regional version of the Children's BBC Breakfast Show between 7am to 8am on BBC Two Scotland throughout the October half-term period, the hour-long slot is presented by Grant Stott until 21 October.
- 1995
  - 9 October – The launch of the BBC Learning Zone sees the end of standalone weekday breakfast Open University transmissions on BBC2. From this date, children's programmes are shown on the channel during the peak breakfast period and the strand is called the Children's BBC Breakfast Show.
  - 16 October – BBC Scotland opts out of the network and broadcast their regional version of the Children's BBC Breakfast Show for the second year running, presented by Grant Stott and Gail Porter between 7:15am to 8:25am on BBC Two Scotland for a whole week until 20 October.
- 1996
  - 5 February – Breakfast News Extra is launched. The 20-minute programme which airs at the end of the main edition of Breakfast News is presented by Juliet Morris.
  - 30 March – Saturday Disney is broadcast on GMTV for the final time.
  - 3 July – The Children's BBC Breakfast Show on BBC Two Scotland is presented by Grant Stott and Gail Porter throughout the opening weeks of the Scottish school Summer holidays, airing between 7:30am to 8:35am until 12 July and the October BBC Two Scotland opt-out returns for a third year.
- 1997
  - 31 March – Channel 5 launches a 90-minute weekday breakfast news programme with 5 News Early. It broadcasts between 6am and 7:30am. The rest of the channel's breakfast airtime is given to its children's strand Milkshake!.
  - 30 June – BBC Two Scotland launch a brand-new Summer holiday children's programme called Up For It! airing between 8:35am to 9:30am for the first three weeks of the Scottish school holidays.
  - 29 August – The final edition of Breakfast News Extra is broadcast.
  - 9 November – BBC News 24 launches and from that night, the new continuous news channel broadcasts all night on BBC One. Consequently, the 15-minute early morning Ceefax is broadcast on BBC One for the final time.
- 1998
  - 14 March – Diggit launches as GMTV's flagship children's programming block. It is broadcast from 7:10am to 9:25am on Saturdays and 8am to 9:25am on Sundays. Additional editions on bank holidays and Summer holidays were shown under the name Diggit Extra.
  - Spring – The first edition of The World Today is broadcast on BBC One and BBC News 24 as it simulcasts overnight with BBC World.
  - 29 June – BBC Two Scotland airs a second series of the Summer holiday children's show Up for It for three weeks of the Scottish Summer holidays, it is now presented by Marsali Stewart from 8:35am to 9:35am.
  - 5 October – Sky One begins simulcasting part of Virgin Radio's The Chris Evans Breakfast Show after Virgin signed a three-year sponsorship deal with BSkyB. Under the agreement, Evans is not allowed to mention Virgin Radio while the programme is being simulcast with Sky.
- 1999
  - 4 January – GMTV2 launches on ITV2. Its broadcast hours are the same as those of the main GMTV service, 6am to 9:25am.

== 2000s ==
- 2000
  - 1 January – Channel 4 airs The Biggest Breakfast Ever, an eight-hour overnight millennium special with Johnny Vaughan and Liza Tarbuck. The channel's New Year's Day schedule also includes a contemporary version of Cinderella starring Kathleen Turner.
  - 15 September – After eleven years on air, the final edition of Breakfast News is broadcast on BBC One.
  - 2 October – The first edition of the BBC's revamped breakfast news programme Breakfast is broadcast. The new series is carried on both BBC One and BBC News 24. Previously, News 24 had aired its own breakfast programme, Breakfast 24.
- 2001
  - 29 August – American illusionist David Blaine appears on GMTV where he is interviewed by Eamonn Holmes, but he refuses to speak and instead gives Holmes the "evil eye". Holmes has subsequently cited this interview as the most awkward moment of his professional career.
  - 20 December – A joint venture between BSkyB and Princess Productions is awarded the contract to replace The Big Breakfast with a new breakfast programme for Channel 4.
- 2002
  - 7 January – Sky News content becomes available on terrestrial television for the first time in a decade when Channel 5 begins simulcasting part of its breakfast news programme Sunrise.
  - 29 March – Channel 4's The Big Breakfast ends after nine and a half years on air.
  - 29 April – The first edition of RI:SE is broadcast on Channel 4.
  - 8 November – Lock Keeper's Cottage, the building in east London used for The Big Breakfast which ended eight months earlier, is destroyed by a fire.
- 2003
  - January – Diggit on GMTV is relaunched as Diggin' It.
  - 19 December – The final edition of RI:SE airs on Channel 4. It is axed because of low ratings. It is not replaced with another breakfast programme, instead, Channel 4 airs series such as Friends and The Salon in its early morning slot.
- 2004
  - No events.
- 2005
  - 5 February – GMTV's Diggin' It and Up on The Roof are merged into a new programme called Toonattik. It is broadcast on Saturdays and Sundays from 7:25am until GMTV's closedown at 9:25am.
  - 22 February – Eamonn Holmes announces he will step down from his role as a GMTV presenter after twelve years.
  - 27 April – Eamonn Holmes presents his final edition of GMTV after twelve years with the broadcaster.
  - 19 May – Eamonn Holmes has signed a deal with Sky News to present their early morning programme Sunrise, it is reported.
  - 29 May – BBC One airs the final edition of Breakfast with Frost after a twelve-year run.
  - 11 September – BBC One launches Sunday AM, a Sunday morning current affairs programme presented by Andrew Marr.
  - 24 October – Eamonn Holmes presents his first edition of Sunrise on Sky News.
- 2006
  - 14 January – Debut of Morning Glory, the fourth attempt at breakfast television on Channel 4. It is presented by Dermot O'Leary every weekday morning from 8:30am to 9am. However, due to low ratings, it is not renewed and ends on 28 January.
  - 21 August – Debut of Channel 4's Freshly Squeezed, a music-based breakfast show aired on weekdays and featuring studio performances, music videos and interviews.
- 2007
  - 9 January – Sky News hires Meridian Tonight presenter Charlotte Hawkins to co-present Sunrise alongside Eamonn Holmes, she makes her debut on 15 January.
  - 16 April – Manchester local television station Channel M launches a breakfast show called Channel M Breakfast.
  - 23 April – A BBC Panorama programme disclosed that callers to GMTV's phone-in competitions may have been defrauded out of millions of pounds, because the telephone system operator, Opera Interactive Technology, had determined the winners before the phone lines had closed. GMTV responded by suspending the phone-in quizzes, but claimed that "it was confident it had not breached regulators' codes". Opera Interactive also denied any wrongdoing.
  - 9 September – The BBC One Sunday morning political programme Sunday AM is renamed The Andrew Marr Show when it returns after its Summer break.
- 2008
  - No events.
- 2009
  - 5 February – To coincide with the 20th anniversary of Sky's launch, at 6am, Sunrise begins presenting from a new "multi-purpose" area of the Sky News Centre, formally known as the "shoebox".
  - 15 May – Channel M Breakfast is axed as part of severe cutbacks to programming output and staffing levels at the station.
  - 26 November – ITV takes full ownership of GMTV after purchasing Disney's 25% share in the channel.

== 2010s ==
- 2010
  - 4 March – Penny Smith announces she is to leave GMTV after 17 years to pursue other projects.
  - 19 April – Adrian Chiles quits the BBC to join ITV in a new four-year deal.
  - 21 April – Ben Shephard announces he is to quit GMTV after ten years.
  - 11 June – GMTV announces plans to rebrand itself in September, dropping the GMTV name after 17 years in a £1.5million overhaul. On the same day, presenter Andrew Castle announces his intention to leave the station after ten years.
  - 20 June – ITV has announced that Christine Bleakley is to join the new breakfast programme to reunite with Adrian Chiles after signing a three-year contract with the broadcaster.
  - 9 July – ITV announces the name of its new breakfast television programme that will replace GMTV, Daybreak, which will launch in September.
  - 3 September – GMTV airs its final edition after 17 years on air.
  - 6 September – New ITV breakfast show Daybreak begins with former The One Show hosts Adrian Chiles and Christine Bleakley presenting. The first edition features an interview with the former Prime Minister Tony Blair, while overnight viewing figures published the following day indicate that it had an audience of over a million.
  - 24 December – The final edition of Action Stations! is broadcast.
  - 26 December – The final editions of The Fluffy Club and Toonattik are broadcast.
- 2011
  - 2 May – The final edition of The World Today in its original format is broadcast on BBC One and BBC News. It is later relaunched as an evening programme in 2024.
- 2012
  - 10 April – BBC Breakfast makes its first broadcast from the BBC's new media complex at Salford Quays in Manchester, having moved there from London.
  - 12 June – Ranvir Singh and Matt Barbet are announced as the new presenters of the Daybreak newshour from 6am to 7am.
  - 3 September – Daybreak is relaunched with Aled Jones and Lorraine Kelly as its main presenters. Overnight figures the following day show that it was watched by 600,000 viewers, fewer than the one million who tuned in to watch its first edition exactly two years earlier.
  - 21 December – Channel 4 airs the final edition of its music-based breakfast programme Freshly Squeezed.
- 2013
  - No events.
- 2014
  - 3 March – Susanna Reid leaves BBC Breakfast to become a presenter on ITV's Daybreak which will relaunch the following month as Good Morning Britain. She will be joined by Ben Shephard, Charlotte Hawkins and Sean Fletcher.
  - 15 March – Kate Garraway confirms she will be part of the Good Morning Britain team when the programme launches the following month.
  - 25 April – Aled Jones and Kate Garraway present the final edition of ITV's Daybreak. Jones begins presenting a new weekend breakfast show, Weekend from the following day.
  - 28 April – Good Morning Britain makes its debut on ITV. The first edition has an average audience of 800,000, just over half of the 1.5 million who tune into BBC Breakfast, but an improvement on ratings for its predecessor Daybreak. However, by 30 April, audiences have fallen to 600,000, the average Daybreak viewership.
  - 14 July – BBC Breakfast confirms that Naga Munchetty will leave BBC World News and the 5am hour, formerly known as The World Today on BBC One to join the presenting team full-time to present shows alongside Charlie Stayt from Thursdays to Saturdays. Bill Turnbull and Louise Minchin will continue to present from Mondays to Wednesdays.
- 2015
  - 2 September – BBC Breakfast presenter Bill Turnbull confirms his intention to leave the programme after fifteen years.
  - 15 October – ITV confirms that Piers Morgan will join Good Morning Britain as a regular member of the presenting team, joining Susanna Reid to present the programme three days a week.
- 2016
  - 26 February – Bill Turnbull presents his final BBC Breakfast after fifteen years as a presenter, later joining Classic FM. Sports presenter Dan Walker is announced as his replacement.
  - 25 March – A fire in the postroom of ITV's London studios temporarily forces Good Morning Britain off air as people are evacuated from the building and the fire tackled.
  - 6 April – ITV News presenter Mark Austin makes his presenting debut on Good Morning Britain.
  - 2 September – Eamonn Holmes announces he is to leave Sky News Sunrise after eleven years.
  - 13 October – Eamonn Holmes presents his final Sky News Sunrise after eleven years.
  - 17 October – Sarah-Jane Mee replaces Eamonn Holmes as co-presenter of Sunrise and is joined by Jonathan Samuels.
- 2017
  - 31 October – BBC One and BBC News Channel replace the standard edition of BBC World News at 5am with The Briefing, long-serving business presenter Sally Bundock becomes the main presenter of the new single-headed programme, with her former co-presenter David Eades becoming deputy presenter.
- 2018
  - 17 January – Sunrise begins broadcasting from Studio 6 at Sky Studios. The new studio includes a virtual space to allow for segments away from the desk area, along with the weather.
  - 13 April – Good Morning Britain and Lorraine are broadcast from The London Studios for the final time, ahead of a move for ITV's daytime programmes to the former BBC Television Centre at White City.
  - 16 April – Good Morning Britain and Lorraine are broadcast from Television Centre for the first time.
  - 2 September – BBC One's The Andrew Marr Show moves to the later timeslot of 10am as part of a shake up of the channel's Sunday morning schedule.
- 2019
  - 13 October – After 30 years on air, the final edition of Sky News Sunrise is broadcast. It is replaced the following day with two new shows, The Early Rundown and Sky News @ Breakfast.

== 2020s ==
- 2020
  - 6 January – ITV extends its breakfast programming to 10am. The changes see Good Morning Britain being extended by 30 minutes, running until 9am, with Lorraine on air for a full hour, from 9am until 10am. The change removes the historic 9:25am demarcation between breakfast and daytime programming that had existed since breakfast television launched on ITV in 1983.
  - 23 September – The weekday editions of Sky News @ Breakfast are renamed Kay Burley.
  - 10 December – Sky News Breakfast replaces Kay Burley after Burley stepped back from presenting the show for six months, as a result of breaching London's tier 2 coronavirus restrictions.
- 2021
  - 14 June – The Great British Breakfast starts on the newly launched GB News channel.
  - 15 September – Louise Minchin co-presents her final edition of BBC Breakfast.
  - 20 December – ITV confirms that Good Morning Britain will go on hiatus over the Christmas period as a result of rapid increase in cases of COVID-19. A special edition of the programme is planned for Christmas Day, but with no programmes on 29, 30 and 31 December. Good Morning Britain returned on 4 January 2022.
- 2022
  - 3 January – GB News launches a new breakfast show, Breakfast with Eamonn and Isabel.
  - 4 January – GB News starts broadcasting an audio simulcast on DAB radio, Breakfast with Eamonn and Isabel becomes the first television breakfast show also to air on radio in the United Kingdom.
  - 8 January – GB News launches The Stephen and Anne Breakfast, airing at weekends.
  - 4 September – Launch of the politics programme Sunday with Laura Kuenssberg on BBC One. Guests on the opening edition include Conservative leadership candidates Rishi Sunak and Liz Truss, as well as First Lady of Ukraine Olena Zelenska.
- 2023
  - No events.
- 2024
  - 2 January – BBC Breakfast's running time on weekdays is extended by 15 minutes and now ends at 9:30am.
  - 8 January – The weekday editions of Sky News Breakfast are refreshed. It now starts at the earlier time of 6am, and new presenters join the programme.
- 2025
  - 15 January – The BBC News Channel stops simulcasting BBC Breakfast during the week, instead airing the global news service which, at that time of day, broadcasts rolling news and Business Today. Breakfast continued to air on the BBC News Channel at the weekend. However, this only lasts for a few months as by the Spring, Breakfast was, once again, airing every day on the BBC News Channel.
  - 29 October – The BBC News Channel, once again, stops simulcasting BBC Breakfast during the week, instead airing the global news service. This follows complaints about the reversal of its decision in April when it stopped the trial international simulcast. Breakfast will continue to air on the BBC News Channel at the weekend, unless there is breaking news at weekends when it will remain with the international feed.
- 2026
  - 5 January – Good Morning Britain (GMB) is extended, at the expense of Lorraine which is cut to 30 minutes and to only air 30 weeks a year. GMB will end at 9:30am when Lorraine is on the air and at 10am the rest of the year. The change also sees GMB move from ITV Studios to ITN.
  - 20 September – BBC Breakfast is aired for the final time on Sundays. It is replaced the following Sunday by a simulcast of the BBC News Channel.
