= Breakfast with Frost =

Sunday morning current affairs programme broadcast by the BBC

- Title screen (1996–2003)
- Genre: Politics
- Presented by: Sir David Frost
- Theme music composer: Chris Blackwell
- Country of origin: United Kingdom
- Original language: English
- No. of episodes: 577 (inc. 1 special)

Production
- Producer: BBC News
- Running time: 60 minutes

Original release
- Network: BBC One
- Release: 3 January 1993 – 29 May 2005

Related
- Sunday AM/The Andrew Marr Show

Breakfast with Frost is a Sunday morning BBC current affairs programme hosted by Sir David Frost. It covered the main political news of the day, with Frost interviewing key figures in the world of politics, and celebrity guests reviewing the Sunday papers. The programme was broadcast on BBC One from 1993 to 2005.

== History ==
=== TV-am ===
Frost was one of the original 'Famous Five' presenters and shareholders of the TV-am consortium, the first ITV breakfast franchise holder. Originally, Frost had promised 'sexual chemistry' as the co-presenter of the daily magazine programme Good Morning Britain with Anna Ford. However, its serious tone meant that within weeks of the station launching in February 1983, it faced poor ratings against the BBC's competing, lighter Breakfast Time, which resulted in a major shakeup of TV-am's programming, management, and presenting line-up.

After being dropped from the weekday morning slot, Frost was chosen to host the Sunday morning edition of Good Morning Britain from 28 August, initially for eight weeks with the belief that Michael Parkinson would return to his full duties in October. By November, Parkinson had returned; however, he was only given the Saturday slot after Frost had increased the number of viewers on Sundays. In summer 1985, it was named The Sunday Programme, then renamed again on 13 September 1986 as David Frost on Sunday, and a final name change in 1988 to Frost on Sunday.

As Frost only worked six months of the year, other hosts would fill in, including Jonathan Dimbleby, Lorraine Kelly, Anne Diamond and Maya Even. A number of episodes were also broadcast by BSB.

The programme continued until the end of TV-am's franchise at the end of 1992, after it lost to GMTV in the 1991 ITV franchise renewal, and the final episode aired on 27 December 1992.

=== BBC ===
The BBC picked up the format straight away, starting the following week on 3 January 1993, and it continued for more than 12 years, until the final edition on 29 May 2005. The first ever guest to be interviewed on Breakfast with Frost was then Prime Minister, John Major. In its early years, a replay of the programme was broadcast on Sky News later on Sunday mornings.

The final edition saw guests including Archbishop Desmond Tutu, comedian Rory Bremner, and BBC director-general Mark Thompson, with TV presenter Carol Vorderman, author Gyles Brandreth, and chef Nigella Lawson reviewing the papers.

== Titles ==
The first opening titles were used from 3 January 1993 to 25 August 1996, the second version was used from 1 September 1996 to 30 August 2003, and the final version was used from 6 September 2003 to 29 May 2005.

Its theme tune was composed by Chris Blackwell.
