= Rub-a-Dub-Tub =

- Created by: Anne Wood
- Presented by: Ivor Cutler; Stratford Johns; Dick King-Smith; Atarah Ben-Tovim
- Country of origin: United Kingdom

Production
- Running time: 60 minutes

Original release
- Network: ITV (TV-am)
- Release: 13 February 1983 – 1 October 1984

Rub-a-Dub-Tub is a children's television series originally broadcast in the United Kingdom on the breakfast television channel TV-am between 1983 and 1984.

In addition to the main regular presenters, the programme also featured appearances by some of the presenting team from the main TV-am programme, including Anne Diamond, Nick Owen and Lizzie Webb.

== Programmes ==
- Teddy Drop Ear
- Yakari
