= Nigel Ryan =

British journalist (1929–2014)

Christopher Nigel John Ryan CBE (12 December 1929 – 18 July 2014) was a British journalist, and an outspoken former Editor of ITN throughout the 1970s, when ITN was influential (through having much-reduced competition), and significantly out-pacing the coverage from the BBC. He had a noted dislike of superfluous trade union practices in the television industry, and could put noses out of joint.

== Early life ==
He was born in north-west Surrey. He attended the Catholic Ampleforth College in Yorkshire and went to university to study modern languages, acquiring a degree in French and Spanish in 1952; he subsequently taught at Eton. His parents moved to Uckfield in Sussex.

== Career ==
Speaking fluent French and Spanish, he became a foreign correspondent.

=== ITN ===
He joined ITN at Television House in 1961, becoming the producer of the UK's first half-hour television news programme, in July 1967.

He became the Editor of ITN on 14 February 1968, when 38. He worked under Donald Edwards (from BBC radio), and Sir David Nicholas had been deputy-editor since 1963, who would follow him as Editor from 1977 to 1989. ITN moved to ITN House on 16 August 1969, where ITN moved to colour television technology from 20 October 1969, but not for broadcasts. Also at ITN was Brian Wenham, later to be Controller of BBC Two.

He showed the Queen around the ITN studios on Thursday 20 November 1969, when she officially opened the building. The Queen launched the early evening bulletin from the production studio, which also took ITV into a colour transmission. In 1970, the annual budget for ITN was £3m. Throughout 1970 and 1971, individual ITA (IBA from 1972) transmitters were converting to colour.

In June 1971 he became the Chief Executive of ITN, as well, when Donald Edwards left the company.

ITN is now ITV News. On Wednesday 14 September 1977, when 47, he resigned from ITN, leaving his job on 4 November 1977.

At a conference organised by the Royal Television Society in Birmingham in October 1977, he revealed that broadcasting trade unions (in the UK) had deliberately prevented recent up-to-date electronic equipment from being implemented. ACTT (the Association of Cinematograph, Television and Allied Technicians) had also attracted negative attention from some film directors.

=== NBC ===
He made documentaries at NBC in the late 1970s.

=== Thames Television ===
He was Director of Programmes from 1980 to 1982 at Thames Television. At a conference held by the Royal Television Society in Southampton, he revealed that broadcasting trade unions were adding to costs, in how these trade unions operated restrictive practices, such as work-to-rule (to keep workforce numbers artificially high).

=== TV-am ===
He joined the board of TV-am, becoming chairman from 1989 to 1992.

== Personal life ==
In the 1960s, he lived in Kent.

He married on Thursday 10 May 1984 in London.

He was awarded the CBE in the 1977 Birthday Honours.

== See also ==
- Timeline of breakfast television in the United Kingdom
