= Good Morning with Anne and Nick =

- Genre: Talk show
- Presented by: Anne Diamond; Nick Owen
- Country of origin: United Kingdom
- Original language: English
- No. of series: 4
- No. of episodes: 600

Production
- Production location: Pebble Mill Studios
- Running time: 105 minutes
- Production company: BBC Pebble Mill

Original release
- Network: BBC1
- Release: 12 October 1992 – 24 May 1996

Good Morning with Anne and Nick is a British daytime television show presented by Anne Diamond and Nick Owen. The presenters had previously worked together in the mid-1980s at TV-am, ITV's breakfast franchise holder. A summer series called Good Morning Summer, presented by Sarah Greene and Will Hanrahan, was broadcast in the summer of 1995.

The programme, which was broadcast on BBC1 from October 1992 to May 1996 (and internationally on BBC Prime), was a direct competitor to ITV's This Morning and broadcast in an identical mid-morning timeslot. The programme featured a mixture of chat, facts, tips, horoscopes and star guests and also included on the hour news and weather summaries. Repeats of the programme were broadcast on UK Living.

== Series ==
- Series 1: 12 October 1992 – 28 May 1993
- Series 2: 11 October 1993 – 27 May 1994
- Series 3: 17 October 1994 – 26 May 1995
- Series 4: 16 October 1995 – 24 May 1996

== Presenters ==
- Anne Diamond
- Nick Owen
- Caroline Righton (stand-in presenter)
- Sarah Greene (Good Morning Summer presenter)
- Will Hanrahan (Good Morning Summer presenter)

== Contributors ==
- Simon Bates (Our Tune)
- Stefan Buczacki (gardening expert)
- Tania Bryer (entertainment correspondent)
- Mark Evans (vet)
- Will Hanrahan (consumer expert; also Good Morning Summer presenter with Sarah Greene)
- Ainsley Harriott (cooking sections)
- Dr Mark Porter (doctor)
- Deidre Sanders (agony aunt)
- Lowri Turner (fashion expert)
