= Breakfast television (disambiguation) =

Breakfast television is a type of infotainment television program which broadcasts live in the morning.

Breakfast television may also refer to:

- Breakfast Television, a Canadian morning news and entertainment television program that debuted on CITY-DT in Toronto in 1989
- Breakfast Television Centre, the former headquarters of TV-am in Camden Town, London, which is now the headquarters of MTV Europe
- "Breakfast Television" (Filthy Rich & Catflap), a TV sitcom episode
