= Jackie Genova =

Australian exercise instructor

Jackie Genova is an Australian-born exercise teacher. She was well known in the United Kingdom during the early 1980s for her TV appearances, particularly on the TV-am show Good Morning Britain where she presented the daily aerobics spot on weekends (Lizzie Webb presented it on weekdays). Her book, video and record album Work That Body! were best-sellers in Britain, the album reaching number 74 on the British charts in May 1983.

Today, Genova works as a psychotherapist in London, specialising in counselling, treating alcohol dependency and eating disorders.
