= Good Morning Britain (1983 TV programme) =

TV-am's main breakfast television show

- Genre: Breakfast television
- Directed by: Nicholas Ferguson
- Presented by: Lorraine Kelly; Richard Keys; Anne Diamond; Nick Owen; Wincey Willis
- Theme music composer: Jeff Wayne
- Opening theme: "Good Morning Britain"
- Country of origin: United Kingdom
- Original language: English

Production
- Production location: Breakfast Television Centre
- Running time: 150-minutes
- Production company: TV-am

Original release
- Network: TV-am (ITV)
- Release: 1 February 1983 – 31 December 1992

Related
- GMTV (1993–2010); Daybreak

Opening shot of the programme from 1986. This shows the main set, and (from left to right) presenters Richard Keys, Anne Diamond, Nick Owen and Wincey Willis. The on-screen clock can be seen at the bottom-right.

Good Morning Britain is TV-am's main breakfast television show, broadcast on weekdays from February 1983 until the franchise ended in 1992. It had many different presenters throughout its run.

After a difficult first few months, which almost led to the failure of the broadcasting franchise, Good Morning Britain became a success.

The studio buildings in Hawley Crescent would later be acquired by what is now Paramount Skydance, and ultimately used as Paramount International Networks' offices.

== Overview ==
Good Morning Britain had a mixture of news and current affairs, weather, cartoons, music, and many popular guests of the time. It also featured a popular exercise section, hosted in the early days by Michael Van Straten and Jackie Genova, and then more famously by "Mad Lizzie" Webb. The news was provided in-house by TV-am, but following its loss of the licence the news provision was contracted out to Sky News, who provided the news service from 1 February to 31 December 1992.

At its peak, the programme would feature large outside broadcasts throughout the European winter/Australian summer from Bondi Beach in Australia, renaming the show G'Day Britain.

Initially, David Frost, Anna Ford, Michael Parkinson, Angela Rippon and Robert Kee were the presenters and main shareholders of the station, but the original format was soon dropped, and all bar Frost left the broadcaster.

Other presenters of the show included Chris Tarrant, Anneka Rice, Richard Keys, Kathy Tayler, Lorraine Kelly, Jayne Irving and Dynasty star Gordon Thomson.

=== Weekday schedule for presenting ===
Years	Presenters
February–April 1983	David Frost and Anna Ford
April 1983	Nick Owen and Angela Rippon or Anna Ford
April–June 1983	Nick Owen and Lynda Berry
June 1983 – 1986	Nick Owen and Anne Diamond or John Stapleton or Henry Kelly
August 1986	Adrian Brown and Anne Diamond
Early 1987	Mike Morris and Anne Diamond or Richard Keys and Anneka Rice
1987–1988	GMB Newshour (06:00–07:00) with Richard Keys or Mike Morris
1987–1988	GMB Main Show with Richard Keys or Mike Morris and Anne Diamond
1988	The Morning Programme (06:00–07:00) with Richard Keys
1988	GMB with Mike Morris and Anne Diamond
1988–1989	The Morning Programme (06:00–07:00) with Richard Keys
1988–1989	GMB with Mike Morris and Kathy Rochford or Kathryn Holloway
1989	The Morning Programme (06:00–07:00) with Richard Keys
1989	GMB with Mike Morris and Kathy Tayler
1989–1992	The Morning Programme (06:00–07:00) with Richard Keys
1989–1992	GMB with Mike Morris and Lorraine Kelly

=== Saturday schedule for presenting ===
Years	Presenters
February–June 1983	Michael Parkinson and Mary Parkinson
June–November 1983	Henry Kelly and Toni Arthur
November 1983 – February 1984	Michael Parkinson and Mary Parkinson
February 1984 – September 1985	Henry Kelly and Toni Arthur or Anneka Rice
September 1985 – 1987	Mike Morris or Richard Keys
1987–1989	Geoff Clark
