= Work That Body =

Work That Body may refer to:

- "Work That Body", a 1979 song by Taana Gardner
- "Work That Body", a song by Diana Ross from her 1981 album Why Do Fools Fall in Love
- "Work That Body", a song by Beni Arashiro from her single "Cherish"
- "Work That Body", an unreleased song by Michael Jackson that was recorded during the sessions for his 1991 album Dangerous that was subsequently leaked.
- Work That Body!, a book and video by exercise teacher Jackie Genova
