= Open College (UK) =

Distance learning college in the UK

The Open College
- Former name: College of the Air (proposed)
- Type: Public distance learning college
- Active: 1987–1991
- Chief Executive: Sheila Innes
- Location: United Kingdom
- Campus: Television-based (Channel 4, TV-am)

The Open College (OC) was a UK public distance learning college from 1987 to 1991, based on the example of the Open University transmitting courses via television programmes on Channel 4 and occasionally on TV-am. It offered vocational courses at sub-degree level, with TV programmes which could be viewed by anyone, but registration and payment was required for other parts of the course and assessment.

== History ==
An announcement was made by Lord Young in 1986 that the government would set up a College of the Air with the aim of reaching one million students within five years. The Open College was an independent company and registered charity, with a three-year agreement with Channel 4 to provide air time and jointly commission material. Programmes were shown on weekday lunchtimes between 1pm and 2pm. Sheila Innes, former Controller of Educational Broadcasting at the BBC, was appointed Chief Executive. It did not offer its own qualifications but rather taught towards existing national ones in basic education and vocational skills, with a particular emphasis on technician jobs.

It opened in September 1987 with 33 courses and 400 local support centres plus a National Distance Learning Centre for those unable to attend a local one, and by September 1988 had 40,000 students, less than the projection of 100,000 for the first year.

There was an initial grant of £15 million, which was supposed to last for three years, by which time the college was intended to be self-supporting, but it received a further £18 million in 1989, by which time it had sold 90,000 courses with prices from £20 for 'The Effective Learner' to £200 for some management courses. The majority of registrations were block bookings by employers, with individuals mainly taking basic maths and English courses.

Though it failed to become self-supporting and closed in 1991, it helped to generate the National Open College Network and the Open College of the Arts.
