= Henry Kelly =

Irish broadcaster (1946–2025)

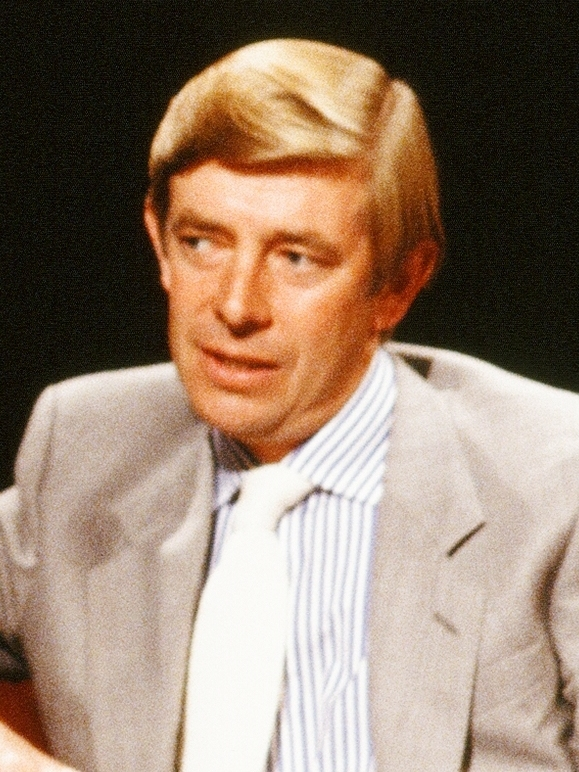
- Kelly hosting After Dark, 1988
- Born: Patrick Henry Kelly; 17 April 1946; Athlone, County Westmeath, Ireland
- Died: 25 February 2025 (aged 78)
- Education: University College Dublin
- Occupations: Television presenter; radio DJ; actor; journalist
- Years active: 1968–2015
- Spouse: Marjorie Conway (divorced)
- Partner: Karolyn Shindler
- Children: 2

Patrick Henry Kelly (17 April 1946 – 25 February 2025), better known as Henry Kelly, was an Irish radio and television broadcaster and journalist who was based in the United Kingdom.

== Early life ==
Kelly was born in Dublin on 17 April 1946 and grew up in Athlone, County Westmeath. He was educated at Belvedere College and University College Dublin. At the latter he was auditor of the Literary and Historical Society. Whilst at university he wrote theatre reviews for The Irish Times.

== Journalism ==
After graduating from University College Dublin with a degree in English in 1968, he became a journalist with The Irish Times, and was promoted to become Belfast-based Northern Editor in 1970, at the start of civil unrest and The Troubles in Northern Ireland, a post which he held for five years. During his time in Northern Ireland, he published the book How Stormont Fell (1972), which is still highly regarded in its field. In 1976, he left The Irish Times and moved to London to work as a reporter for the British Broadcasting Corporation on its Radio 4 The World Tonight programme.

== Television ==
In 1980, in a career change at the age of 34, Kelly abandoned print journalism and pursued a career in television, presenting light entertainment shows. Whilst at university, Kelly had been a friend of the family of Terry Wogan, and he was drawn to try to emulate Wogan's career path by the professional success Wogan was experiencing by the late 1970s with the BBC.

In 1981, Kelly secured a co-presenter slot on the United Kingdom's ITV television channel with the London Weekend Television prime-time light-entertainment show Game for a Laugh, which was a ratings success and made him a household name in the country. He remained with the show until 1983. In June 1983 Kelly joined TV-am, and co-hosted the Saturday edition of Good Morning Britain with Toni Arthur. He was also a regular stand-in presenter on the weekday programme and presented Summer Sunday. On Saturday 3 January 1987 he hosted RTE's Saturday Live. He left TV-am in 1987, and from 1987 to 1996 he presented Going for Gold, a lunchtime television quiz show on BBC1, with contestants from across Europe.

In 1988, he briefly returned to journalism and chaired After Dark, on 13 August, for the "Derry '68" episode. He had previously appeared on the programme discussing the activities of the Northern Ireland Civil Rights Association, which he had witnessed first-hand as a journalist in the early 1970s.

In 2000, he appeared as a quiz show host in the final two episodes of the Victoria Wood sitcom dinnerladies. Kelly had previously worked with Wood on her show Victoria Wood: As Seen on TV in the 1980s. He also appeared occasionally on Sky News television reviewing Sunday newspapers.

== Radio ==
In 1992, Kelly was one of the launch presenters of Classic FM, initially presenting the weekday mid-morning show from 9 am to noon, then later 8 am to noon. He then moved on to the Breakfast Show, until he was replaced by Simon Bates in June 2003. He returned between 2006 and 2008 to present a three-hour show on Sunday mornings.

In September 2003, Kelly took up the Drivetime slot on a London news-and-talk station LBC 97.3. In February 2004 he declared himself bankrupt thirteen years after the Inland Revenue had sued him for the non-payment during the 1980s of income tax and national insurance contributions. At the end of 2004, Kelly and some of LBC's most experienced presenters, such as Brian Hayes and Angela Rippon, did not have their contracts renewed.

Kelly spent two weeks in June 2005 presenting the late show on BBC Radio London 94.9, and in September 2005 took over the weekday mid-morning show on BBC Radio Berkshire from 10 am to 1 pm. He later presented a Saturday mid-morning show for the station until 2015.

== Other work ==
In 2013, Kelly presented a series of filmed adverts for a Golders Green used car dealership and garage. He was also the narrator for most of Video 125's Driver's Eye Views of Irish railways.

== Personal life and death ==
Kelly was in a relationship with journalist Karolyn Shindler, and they resided in Hampstead, North London. A previous marriage to Marjorie Conway ended in divorce. He had a daughter from his first marriage and a son from his relationship with Shindler. Kelly enjoyed golf and in 1994 he won the inaugural William Roache Charity Classic Invitational, held at Woburn.

Kelly died on 25 February 2025, aged 78.

== Publications ==
- How Stormont Fell (1972), ISBN 978-0717106325
- Classic FM Musical Anecdotes (1998), ISBN 978-0340728819
