= Nicky Keig-Shevlin =

Radio presenter

- Born: 1 January 1965; Worthing, West Sussex
- Occupation: Radio Broadcaster

Nicola Keig-Shevlin (born 1 January 1965) is a radio presenter who spent the majority of her career working for Brighton based station Southern FM (formerly Southern Sound). She presented the weekday breakfast show 'Danny and Nicky in the Morning' with Danny Pike for 19 years. Nicky lives in Hove with her husband Bob Booker, Brighton and Hove Albion FC's former reserve team coach.

In the late 1980s Keig-Shevlin co-presented a late Sunday evening show on Southern FM with Tommy Boyd. The format of the show was phone-in/quiz style with the occasional record thrown in - 'Two Little Boys' by Rolf Harris and 'Narcissus' by Bonzo Dog Doo-Dah Band ("Hey, you have the same trouble with your trousers I do!" etc.) being two that featured regularly. Each show ended with the playing of "What a Wonderful World" by Louis Armstrong.

On Monday 9 June 2008, Nicky announced that she would be 'hanging up her headphones' after an extensive career that has spanned over two decades at the Southern FM radio station. Her last day on air was Thursday 19 June 2008.

On 19 May 2017 she returned to the airwaves for a special one-off show co-hosting with Tommy Boyd on Talkradio.
