= Hey, Hey, It's Saturday! (British TV programme) =

British children's television series

- Starring: Timmy Mallett; Tommy Boyd; Mike Brosnan; Michaela Strachan
- Country of origin: United Kingdom

Production
- Running time: 30 min.

Original release
- Network: TV-am (ITV)
- Release: July 1990 – September 1991

Hey, Hey, It's Saturday! is a British children's Saturday morning television programme that aired on the breakfast television channel TV-am. Based on the Australian Saturday morning/night television programme of the same name, it ran from July 1990 until September 1991. The programme was produced by Clear Idea Productions. It was presented alternately by Timmy Mallett, Tommy Boyd, Mike Brosnan and Michaela Strachan.

It was a replacement for WAC '90, which was previously known as the Wide Awake Club, and it was replaced by TV Mayhem.

The programme included several animated and live-action television series such as Alvin and the Chipmunks, Captain N: The Game Master, Maxie's World, Top Banana, Dink, the Little Dinosaur, Animals in Action, The New Archies, The Super Mario Bros. Super Show, Captain Planet and the Planeteers, The Adventures of Portland Bill and the American situation comedy series The Charmings.
