= Atarah Ben-Tovim =

British flautist (1940–2022)

Atarah Ben-Tovim MBE
- Born: 1 October 1940; Abergavenny, Wales
- Died: 20 October 2022 (aged 82)
- Formerly of: The Right Instrument for Your Child

Atarah Ben-Tovim, MBE (1 October 1940 – 20 October 2022) was a British flautist and children's concert presenter.

== Biography ==
Ben-Tovim was born in Abergavenny, Wales, in a family with a Jewish background. Her father, Harry Ben-Tovim, was an Israeli doctor, and her mother, Gladys Rachel (née Carengold), was the daughter of a Jewish immigrant draper from Russia. She was the aunt of Sister Bliss. Her early years were spent in Ealing, London. Ben-Tovim played her first television concert live at the Royal Albert Hall, at the age of fourteen. She was principal flautist with the National Youth Orchestra, and then from 1963 to 1975 principal flautist with the Royal Liverpool Philharmonic Orchestra. She left the RLPO to found Atarah's Band in 1975, a group which sought to improve children's experiences with classical music.

Ben-Tovim guested on several British television and radio shows, including Pebble Mill at One on BBC TV, The John Dunn Show, Start the Week and Kaleidoscope.

In the late 1980s, BBC Radio Three made the programme Atarah's Music Box, all about children and music. Omnibus devoted a programme to her work, as did Blue Peter and Magpie. Her own television series, Atarah's Music, aimed at primary school children, aired on ITV in 1984, and the following year she presented five episodes of the long-running ITV Schools series Seeing and Doing, teaching children about basic musical theory and the differences between various instruments.

Together with her husband, Douglas Boyd, she published The Right Instrument for Your Child followed by You Can Make Music!. Both books concentrated on helping aspiring music students to choose the best instrument for their particular attributes.

Ben-Tovim and Boyd undertook research with thousands of students over a period of ten years in which they followed the successes and failures of these students and examined the relationship between their physical, emotional and intellectual attributes and the instruments which they chose.

Ben-Tovim's musical stories for little children in Rub-a-Dub-Tub on Sunday mornings ran for over two years. Her radio series have been broadcast on several local independent radio stations including Birmingham's BRMB, Liverpool's Radio City and Radio Merseyside, Manchester's Radio Piccadilly, and Preston's Red Rose Radio.

== Awards and recognition ==
Ben-Tovim was appointed Member of the Order of the British Empire (MBE) in the 1980 New Year Honours for services to children's music. During its lifetime, the band played to over three million people.

== Personal life and death ==
In her later years, Ben-Tovim resided in France, where she taught and held workshops for budding flautists and clarinettists.

Ben-Tovim died from cancer on 20 October 2022, at the age of 82.
