= Hillside School, Malvern =

Hillside School
- Malvern, Worcestershire; England

Information
- School type: Preparatory and Pre-preparatory
- Founded: 1870
- Founder: Rev Edward Ford
- Closed: 1991

Hillside School was a private preparatory and pre-preparatory boys and girls school in Malvern, Worcestershire, England which was opened in 1870 and closed at the end of 1991 due to lack of demand in the area at the time. In the 1950s and 1960s it was a leading independent school in the area and had around 400 pupils.

== Foundation ==
Hillside School was founded in 1870 by Rev Edward Ford as a boys' school, in West Malvern Road near a water spring of the same name. In the 1950s, the school relocated and the original building was divided up into private residences.

== Recent history ==
By 1955, Hillside had expanded to include girls. It relocated first to one, and then to two large houses in Worcester Road, facing the Malvern Link Common. The lower building was acquired later than 1955, at 179 Worcester Road and opposite the junction of Cockshot Road. It housed the senior boys' department and nursery/kindergarten, while the upper building, three houses along westwards, contained the girls' and junior boys' departments. The latter was known variously as the "girls school" or "top school", the former the "boys school". The school excelled in preparing its pupils for the 11+ and Common Entrance examinations which qualified them for entry to local grammar and private secondary schools.

At that time, Hillside was run by headmaster F W Quibell-Smith, former choirmaster and organist. St. Edmund's, Dudley; music master, Lichfield. Grammar School, and organist at Malvern Priory. His wife Dorothy was headmistress of the kindergarten and girls school, and his sons John and Peter later helped out in various capacities. Hillside had about 200 pupils and employed around a dozen other teachers, some of whom were part-time. The school did not possess playing fields of its own, and some sports lessons were held on Malvern Link Common. John Quibell-Smith wrote plays for the annual Speech Day, which involved as many members of the school as possible.

A school badge was devised in 1956 or 1957 showing three primroses for learning with a background of a stylised triangular hill and the initials H and S on either side of the apex of the hill. Uniforms included a navy blue blazer for the boys with yellow piping, a tie with horizontal navy blue and yellow stripes, and a navy blue cap with yellow piping on the quadrants. Girls wore a navy blue traditional gym slip with a knitted yellow girdle round the waist.

In April 1957, Queen Elizabeth II visited Malvern and as her route passed the school, pupils lined Worcester Road to wave.

When F W Quibell-Smith retired, his son John took over as headmaster. The falling demand for private school education in the 1980s, however, led to the school's closure at the end of 1991. The top school has since been converted to flats and the boys school building on Worcester Road is currently a private residence.

In 2012 a 40-year reunion was held by former pupils of the school from the 1960s and 1970s.
