= Mike Morris (TV presenter) =

British television anchor (1946–2012)

- Promotional photograph from TV-am
- Born: Michael Hugh Saunderson Morris; 26 June 1946; Harrow, Middlesex, England,
- Died: 22 October 2012 (aged 66); Dorking, Surrey, England
- Education: University of Manchester (BA)
- Occupations: Television presenter; journalist
- Years active: 1969–2002
- Employers: TV-am (1983–1992); Yorkshire Television (1996–2002)
- Notable credits: Thames News; Calendar

Michael Hugh Saunderson Morris (26 June 1946 – 22 October 2012) was a British television presenter and journalist, best known as a main anchor for TV-am's flagship breakfast television programme Good Morning Britain.

== Early life ==
Morris was born in Harrow, Middlesex. He attended St Paul's School in London, and the University of Manchester, at which he gained a BA degree in American and English Literature.

== Career ==
Morris's career as a journalist began in 1969 when he joined the Surrey Comet, a local weekly newspaper. He later moved to Sydney in Australia and became a bulletin editor for the news agency AAP Reuters, before switching to sports journalism in 1974 when he joined United Newspapers as a reporter and later, sports editor.

Morris switched to broadcasting in 1979 when he became a sub-editor and reporter for regional news programme Thames News in London. Four years later, he was part of the launch team at TV-am, initially as a sports correspondent before becoming presenter of Good Morning Britain's Saturday edition. He became a chief weekday anchor in 1987, presenting alongside Anne Diamond, Kathy Tayler, Maya Even and Lorraine Kelly among others. While at the station, he conducted the first live interview on British television with Nelson Mandela, shortly after his release from prison.

He remained with TV-am until the station lost its ITV franchise at the end of 1992, he famously told reporters that he was 'gutted' when the station lost its franchise a year earlier. He later joined GMTV to present its Sunday magazine show Sunday Best in April 1993 and also presented on the now closed cable channel Wire TV.

Morris returned to regional television in 1996 when he became a main anchor for Yorkshire Television's flagship news programme Calendar, alongside Christa Ackroyd and Christine Talbot. He left YTV in March 2002.

== Personal life and death ==
Morris died from heart failure aged 66 on 22 October 2012, after suffering from cancer. He is survived by two daughters and four grandchildren.
