= Wincey Willis =

British broadcaster (1948–2024)

- Born: Florence Winsome Leighton; 8 August 1948; Gateshead, County Durham, England
- Died: 19 December 2024 (aged 76)
- Television: Good Morning Britain, Treasure Hunt
- Spouse: Malcolm Willis (m. 1972, divorced)

Wincey Willis (born Florence Winsome Leighton; 8 August 1948 – 19 December 2024) was a British television and radio broadcaster who achieved national fame in the 1980s. She was perhaps best known for being part of the line up at TV-am, the UK's first national operator of a commercial breakfast television franchise, in which she was ITV's first female weather presenter, appearing on Good Morning Britain. She was also known for her adjudicator role in the popular television game show Treasure Hunt.

== Early life and education ==
Willis was born to a single mother in Gateshead, County Durham, on 8 August 1948. She grew up in Hartlepool and Barnard Castle. She was adopted by older parents, Florence, née Brown, and Thomas Dimmock, for whom she was an only child. In 2011, Willis said that she had never attempted to find her birth parents. Her poem on this subject, "Adoption", was recorded for a CD to celebrate the 25th anniversary of the BBC's Poetry Please radio series. She described herself as having "quite a strict upbringing", with no alcohol in the house and regular Christian worship.

Rather than going by her first name, Florence, she used her middle name, Winsome, explaining that "The kids at infant school started calling me Wincey when we learnt the nursery rhyme Incey Wincey Spider".

As a child, she wanted to be a vet. Willis left school at 16 and took a year out, before going to France and doing the equivalent of A-levels there. She then got a place at Strasbourg University.

== Career ==
Willis began her career as a travel rep, where she worked in North Africa, before becoming a Rep for DJM Records and moving to the record library and promotions department at Radio Tees in Stockton on Tees. Her first on-air appearance was on a Saturday morning show presented by Les Ross. She joined Tyne Tees Television in September 1981 presenting the weather forecast on the evening news magazine Northern Life, despite admitting that it was not a subject she specialised in. The following year, she hosted her own Granada Television series, Wincey's Pets.

As part of the relaunch of TV-am by its new editor, Greg Dyke, Willis was poached from Tyne Tees. She replaced Commander David Philpott as the station's main weekday weather presenter on Good Morning Britain in May 1983. In doing so, she became ITV's first national female weather presenter. In addition to this, Willis hosted other segments on TV-am, such as those featuring pets and animals.

In 1985, she joined the game show Treasure Hunt as an adjudicator, working with Anneka Rice and Kenneth Kendall. Willis's first book, It's Raining Cats and Dogs, written about her animals, was published in 1986, with an introduction by naturalist Gerald Durrell. The same year saw the launch of The Weather Game, a board game made by Waddingtons and devised by Willis.

In 1987, she left TV-am to do other television work and work on conservation projects. She appeared in the title role in the Dick Whittington pantomime at City Hall in St Albans, alongside the Chuckle Brothers, in 1988. In 1989, she co-starred with Simon Groom in Dick Whittington at the Epsom Playhouse. Her second book, Greendays, was published in 1990. This was a diary with facts about environmental issues, featuring suggestions of relevant activities and projects. Her regular appearances on national television came to an end that year.

Willis took several years out to be a conservation volunteer around the world, at one point living in a tent on a Greek beach for six months whilst she guarded the local turtle population. She returned to television as a wildlife presenter in 1993 when she was given a slot on Tyne Tees Weekend. In 1999 it was reported that Willis was working for a worm composting company, and had said that her television work "had just dried up".

Willis presented a radio programme on BBC Coventry & Warwickshire from 2006 to 2009. She was also the presenter and narrator of Left-handed children: a guide for teachers and parents, a 2010 educational video guide; she herself was left-handed. That year, it was announced that she would be presenting The Big Day Out, a Saturday morning radio programme on BBC Hereford & Worcester. Willis hosted the show from August 2010 until September 2012.

She appeared as a contestant on the BBC television quiz show Celebrity Eggheads in December 2011. In May 2014, she appeared in An Audience With Wincey Willis at the Courtyard Theatre in Hereford. Her last television appearance was as a guest on Lorraine in September that year, in an edition of the show celebrating 30 years on screen for the programme's host, Lorraine Kelly.

== Personal life and death ==
Willis lived in the former Winston railway station in County Durham, which was on the closed Barnard Castle line. Known for her love of animals, she had over 50 of them living in her home. While at TV-am, Willis also lived in a flat in Camden, north west London, returning to Barnard Castle every other weekend. She later moved to Hereford. She was an advanced scuba diver.

She married Malcolm Willis, a bed salesman, in 1972, but the couple were later divorced.

Willis was diagnosed with frontotemporal dementia in 2015, following which she returned to the north east and lived in Sunderland. She died on 19 December 2024, at the age of 76. However, news of her death was not made public in the media until June 2025.

== Bibliography ==
- It's Raining Cats and Dogs, Elm Tree (ISBN 9780241118481, 1986)
- Greendays, Red Fox (ISBN 9780099790006, 1990)
- Words, Coleman, Bristow (ISBN 9780953376506, 1998)
