= TV Mayhem =

1991 British television series

- Starring: Chris Evans
- Country of origin: United Kingdom

Production
- Running time: 85 min

Original release
- Network: TV-am (ITV)
- Release: September 1991 – October 1991

TV Mayhem is a short-lived British children's Saturday morning television series that was originally a replacement for Hey Hey It's Saturday after it was cancelled and aired from September 1991 for just six weeks on the breakfast television channel TV-am.

The show was presented by Chris Evans, who later went on to co-host The Big Breakfast in 1992 on Channel 4. He had previously hosted a similar show on the BSB music channel, The Power Station, called Power Up. TV Mayhem was to all intents a direct lift from it.

Cartoons that were aired included all the animated segments from Wake, Rattle and Roll (which were Fender Bender 500 and Monster Tails) and Bill and Ted's Excellent Adventures.

It was due to last 40 weeks but was cancelled after TV-am lost its licence to GMTV, then known as Sunrise Television, on 16 October.

Neither Hey Hey It's Saturday nor TV Mayhem ever enjoyed the success of the Wide Awake Club or WAC '90. Despite this, both shows are fondly remembered by those who watched them.

After TV Mayhem got axed, TV-am replaced it with a new Saturday morning block programme for children called Cartoon World, which as the name suggests, only showed cartoons. This ran from November 1991 to TV-am's demise in December 1992.
