= Mary Parkinson =

British journalist (born 1936)

- Born: Mary Agnes Heneghan; 16 July 1936 (age 88); Doncaster, West Riding of Yorkshire, England
- Occupations: Broadcaster; journalist
- Years active: 1972–1987
- Spouse: Michael Parkinson (m. 1959; died 2023)
- Children: 3

Mary Agnes, Lady Parkinson (née Heneghan; born 16 July 1936) is a British former journalist and television presenter who was married to fellow broadcaster and television personality Sir Michael Parkinson from 1959 until his death in 2023.

== Biography ==
Parkinson was born in Doncaster. She presented the 1970s magazine programme Good Afternoon, produced by Thames Television. Amongst other television work, she also frequently appeared as a panellist on Through the Keyhole.
