= Tommy Boyd =

British DJ

- Born: Timothy Leslie Boyd; 14 December 1952 (age 73); Ealing, Middlesex, England
- Occupation: Broadcaster
- Years active: 1975–present

Timothy Leslie "Tommy" Boyd (born 14 December 1952) is a British television and radio presenter. He gained prominence in the 1970s and 1980s as host of the children's television programmes Magpie, Wide Awake Club, and The Saturday Show. Between 1995 and 2002, he was best known for his radio shows on Talksport, where he adopted a more outspoken and controversial style.

== Early life ==
Boyd was raised in West London. When he was seven, his younger sister Sally died after a two-year illness from a neurological condition, which affected his parents greatly. Boyd was a Redcoat entertainer at the Butlins resort in Bognor Regis as a teenager, where he saw comedians Tommy Cooper, Ken Dodd, and Bob Monkhouse perform. The three had a particular influence on Boyd, "I drank it all in, seeing what they did and how they did it". It was there where Tommy Trinder, the resident comedian at the resort, suggested Boyd change his first name. He recalled: "On my birth certificate, it still says Timmy, but he told me, 'You've got to be really funny if you're a Tim. Tims are nice guys, but you're a cheeky chappie like me. You're a Tommy.' So I changed one vowel."

== Career ==
=== Television ===
Boyd expressed a desire to work in television from watching John Noakes present the children's programme Blue Peter on the BBC. In 1977, he secured an audition as the replacement co-presenter of the children's magazine show Magpie on ITV, replacing Douglas Rae. He botched a pancake making routine on purpose that resembled Noakes' style which gained a round of applause from the camera crew, and landed the job. The show was scrapped due to high production costs in 1980, after which Boyd presented the news quiz What's Happening?, in 1981. He presented Wide Awake Club on Saturday mornings from 1986 to 1990, and its Sunday spin-off WAC Extra, throughout the 1980s. In 1982, he joined the cast of Jigsaw, including Janet Ellis, Sylvester McCoy and David Rappaport. Boyd also hosted the BBC programme Puzzle Trail.

Between 1982 and 1985, Boyd fronted Central Television's Saturday morning kids TV show The Saturday Show (later The Saturday Starship) alongside Isla St Clair who was later replaced by Bonnie Langford. He was the host of CITV between 1991 and 1993. In 1993 and 1994, Boyd worked on The Children's Channel, a satellite television channel. In 1997, Boyd presented MLB on Five.

=== Radio ===
==== 1970s–1980s ====
During the late 1970s, he hosted the Saturday morning radio show Jellybone, aimed at children, on LBC radio in London. The show featured items such as a phone-in news quiz, and a segment where group or club members – such as bus spotters – were invited into the studio to discuss their hobby, and to take part in the Jellybone Jury, reviewing and scoring the latest record releases. He later hosted the weekend Nightline phone-in programme, replacing Jeremy Beadle as host on Sunday nights in June 1980. The programme is remembered for its mystery guest segment, where a famous person would come in and put on a fake voice and listeners would call in and guess who it was – Roy Castle once featured and "talked" only by playing his trombone. For his Nightline show Boyd was awarded the Royal Variety Club Radio Personality of the Year. He returned to children's radio on LBC with a Sunday afternoon programme called Lazily Stacey, named after a fictional detective he had invented. He later co-presented the breakfast show with Anne Diamond, before finally leaving the station in 1999.

During the late 1980s, Boyd was a radio presenter on the ILR station Southern Sound on the late Sunday evening show along with Nicky Keig-Shevlin and David Legg. The format of the show was phone-in/quiz style with occasional music. Boyd signed off each show by playing "What a Wonderful World" by Louis Armstrong.

On BBC Radio 5 Live he presented the weekday afternoon show between 14:00 and 17:00, which consisted of sport and music.

==== 1995–2002: Talksport ====
In February 1995, Boyd was amongst the inaugural line-up of presenters of the AM station Talksport (initially Talk Radio UK) until November 1998, when he lost his job in a reshuffle after it was taken over by a consortium led by former Sun newspaper editor Kelvin MacKenzie. It was during this tenure that Boyd gained a reputation for being controversial and engaging in heated debates. Less argumentative strands of the show would also see the emergence of "The Angry Hour" and "The Wonderful Hour". After covering for absent presenters on several occasions, Boyd took up a permanent position in April 2000. Boyd also hosted a weekly professional wrestling show on Talksport called Talk Wrestling. In February 2002, he helped organise Revival, a wrestling event at Crystal Palace Arena that featured former WWE superstars Eddie Guerrero and Brian Christopher.

In May 2000, Boyd began to take calls straight to air and unscreened on Sunday nights which became known as The Human Zoo with co-presenter Asher Gould. Boyd was sacked in March 2002 after failing to use the profanity delay to "dump" one caller's remarks that contained the word "fucking" and that the British Royal Family should be shot. The segment aired hours after the death of the Queen Mother.

==== 2004–present ====
In 2004 Boyd joined BBC Southern Counties Radio, presenting a Saturday night show with co-host Allison Ferns, where he revived The Human Zoo and other more controversial aspects of his previous Talksport show. Boyd moved to the weekday afternoon slot in 2006, again reviving popular elements from the past such as "The Angry Hour", "The Irritable Hour", and "The Wonderful Hour". In August 2007, Boyd co-presented a Sunday night show on Play Radio UK, an Internet radio station. In January 2008, he moved to Original 106 FM, hosting the weekday breakfast show until September, before he returned to Play Radio UK with a general talk and phone-in weekday nights, billed as Global News Talk.

In 2009, he launched Digital Sport Radio, which makes radio for major sporting clubs and brands. On 19 May 2017, Boyd presented a one-off show on TalkRadio. Over the following weeks he went on to fill various other time slots on the station in lieu of the usual presenters.

On 5 February 2023, Boyd returned to radio with a Sunday night show on Brighton's Regency Radio from 10:00 PM until 1:00 AM, where he was joined by former Southern Sound presenters Nicky Keig-Shevlin and David Legge. The show's run ended in the spring of the same year.
