= Nick Owen =

English television presenter and newsreader (born 1947)

Nick Owen MBE
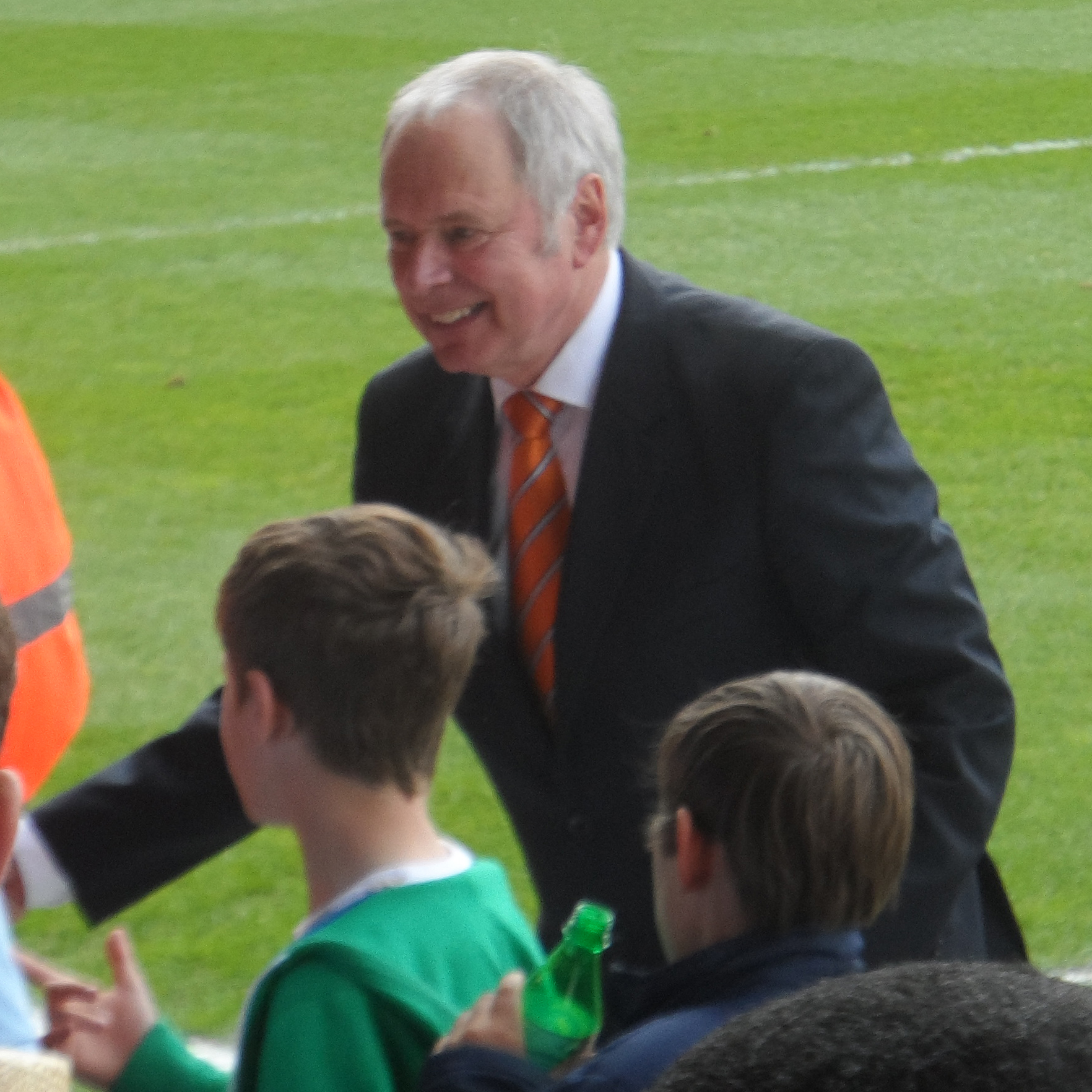
- Owen talks to Luton Town supporters before a match at Kenilworth Road in 2014
- Born: Nicholas Corbishley Owen; 1 November 1947 (age 78); Berkhamsted, Hertfordshire, England
- Occupations: Broadcaster; newsreader
- Years active: 1973–present
- Television: Good Morning Britain (1983–86); ITV Sport (1986–92); Good Morning with Anne and Nick (1992–96); Midlands Today (since 1997)
- Spouses: Jill Lavery (m. 1977; div. 2012) Vicki Beevers (m. 2020)
- Children: 4

Nicholas Corbishley Owen MBE (born 1 November 1947) is an English television presenter and newsreader, best known for presenting the ITV breakfast programme Good Morning Britain, Good Morning with Anne and Nick, ITV Sport, and the BBC's regional news show Midlands Today since 1997. He was also the chairman of Luton Town Football Club between 2008 and 2017.

== Early life and education ==
Owen was born in Berkhamsted, Hertfordshire, to father Bertie, a headmaster and Dunkirk veteran, and mother Esme (née Burton), a music teacher. He was educated at Kingsland Grange Prep School, then Shrewsbury School between the ages of 7 and 18. While at Kingsland Grange, Owen borrowed a Cliff Richard record from Bob Warman, who later went on to become the longest-serving regional news presenter on ATV and Central in the Midlands. Also while there he would hand-write his own newspaper and take it to a copier to print, said to be his first experience of journalism.

Owen completed his education at the University of Leeds where he obtained a BA (Hons) degree in Classics in 1969.

== Early career ==
Owen's first job was as a graduate trainee on the Doncaster Evening Post. After two years Owen moved to a job at the Birmingham Post, where he reported on local news. He started working for the BBC's local radio station BBC Radio Birmingham in 1973, as a news producer and later as sports editor. His first live broadcast was an early-morning news bulletin during the Les Ross show.

== Television career ==
Owen joined ATV in 1978, where he worked as a sport reporter, commentator and presenter for ATV news. He covered the European Football Championships in 1980 and Owen also narrated the first two series of Bullseye, the darts show that was presented by Jim Bowen. He appeared on the programme in 1983 throwing darts for charity when he scored 177; the guest players at the time had a 60-point start.

When ATV became Central TV on 1 January 1982 and brought in a new dual news service for the east and west Midlands. Owen and Anne Diamond were chosen to present the new Central News East, but neither presenter was ever seen on screen due to an industrial dispute at the new studios in Nottingham. For the rest of 1982 Owen returned to being Sports presenter on the Main West Edition and while in the summer 1982 commentated on the World Cup for ITV.

Owen left Central in January 1983 to join TV-am as a sports presenter. After six weeks the station was in turmoil and Greg Dyke was brought in as director of programmes. Dyke moved Owen to become a main presenter of Good Morning Britain from 5 April 1983 and he was soon teamed up with Anne Diamond until 1986, when he left. During this time, he appeared as himself in Episode 6 of the comedy series Hot Metal.

Having left TV-am in the summer 1986, he then became the main presenter for ITV Sport, remaining with them until 1992, presenting Midweek Sport Special and ITV's coverage of the 1988 Olympic Games, Euro 88 and the 1990 World Cup as well as the game show Sporting Triangles. Owen also hosted TV game show Hitman.

From 1992 to 1996 he co-presented Good Morning with Anne and Nick on BBC One.

Since 1997 Nick has been one of the lead presenters on BBC Midlands Today.

In 2006 he was awarded the Baird Medal by the Royal Television Society, Midlands, for lifelong achievement in television. He was named UK Speaker of the Year in 2010 by the National Association of Speakers Clubs. In 2023 Owen was named On Screen Personality of the Year by the Royal Television Society, (Midlands)

In June 2021, he appeared in an episode of the BBC soap opera Doctors as himself. This was his second appearance on the programme.

== Luton Town ==
A lifelong fan of Luton Town, Owen became the chairman of the club when he was asked to represent the Luton Town Football Club 2020 consortium when they purchased the club in 2008 following a period in administration. However, Owen was never a shareholder or director. The club began the 2008–09 season with a 30-point deficit, and were consequently relegated from the Football League to the Conference Premier on 13 April 2009. However, Luton did win the Football League Trophy that year in front of 42,000 Luton fans at Wembley, despite being the lowest-placed team in the competition for the whole season. Owen stepped down as club chairman in August 2017 passing the role to David Wilkinson, as the club moved back up the divisions.

== Personal life ==
Owen married Jill Lavery in 1977 in Birmingham. The couple had four children and lived together in Berkhamsted and Birmingham until August 2009, when they separated. They divorced in 2012. Owen married reflexologist Vicki Beevers, on 6 July 2020 at Enville, Staffordshire.

Owen has been awarded two honorary doctorates for services to broadcasting by the University of Worcester and the University of Chester.

Owen was diagnosed with prostate cancer in April 2023. Following this, he went on hiatus from broadcasting for a while and underwent a radical prostatectomy to treat the cancer. In December 2025, Owen underwent surgery for kidney cancer.

Owen was appointed a Member of the Order of the British Empire in the King's Birthday Honours 2024 for his services to charity and broadcasting.

== Special awards ==
- Member of the Order of the British Empire, 2024
- UK Speaker of the Year, 2010
- On Screen Personality of the Year, 2023

== Publications ==
- Owen, N. In the Time of Nick (autobiography), Brewin Books, 2004 (ISBN 978-1858582573)

== Audio clips ==
- Talking about Luton Town

Media offices
Preceded by Alan Towers	Presenter of Midlands Today; 1997–Present	Succeeded by Incumbent
Business positions
Preceded by Not known	Chairman of Luton Town F.C. 2008–Present	Succeeded by Incumbent
Business positions
Preceded by Not known	President of Derbyshire County Cricket Club; 2007–2009	Succeeded by Not known
