= Lizzie Webb =

British fitness expert

- Born: Elizabeth Beveridge; 12 August 1948 (age 77); Barnet, London, England, UK
- Occupations: Fitness instructor, TV presenter
- Years active: 1983–present
- Spouse: Douglas Cameron (m. 2008)

Lizzie Webb (née Beveridge; 12 August 1948) is an English fitness expert, author and presenter. In the 1980s and 1990s she presented daily exercise routines on British morning television channel TV-am. She was introduced onto the channel's flagship show Good Morning Britain in response to the popularity of exercise teacher Diana Moran ("the Green Goddess") on the rival BBC One show Breakfast Time. She created many videos, such as Pop Dance with Lizzie, Shake-out with Lizzie and many more. She has produced 9 videos (8 exercise, 1 dance) and 8 books. Her first video was The Body Programme with Lizzie Webb and her last was Pop Dance with Lizzie!!!

Lizzie Webb's first fitness video released on VHS by MSD Video, topped the UK video charts in 1987. In 1988, after the Julio Iglesias and Stevie Wonder duet "My Love" was a UK top-5 hit after being featured during Webb's workout segments on TV-am, she was invited to curate her own love songs compilation album, From Lizzie with Love, and released for the 1988 Christmas market.

Webb is the founder of the Joggy Bear Education Programme, aimed at Foundation Stage and Key Stage 1 children.

Webb was married to maths teacher Andrew Webb with whom she had a son, but after a nine-year marriage they divorced. In 2008 she married Douglas Cameron.

Webb has since appeared on ITV's That Antony Cotton Show, an episode of Pointless Celebrities and as a guest on Loose Women in 2018.
