= TV-am =

British national television broadcaster (1983–1992)

- Type: Breakfast television
- Country: United Kingdom
- Headquarters: Breakfast Television Centre, London
- Launch date: 1 February 1983
- Dissolved: 31 December 1992 (after 9 years, 334 days)
- Affiliation: ITV
- Official website: Official website
- Language: English
- Replaced by: GMTV

TV-am was a television company that broadcast the ITV franchise for breakfast television in the United Kingdom from 1 February 1983 until 31 December 1992. The station was the UK's first national operator of a commercial breakfast television franchise. Its daily broadcasts were between 6:00 am and 9:25 am.

Throughout its nine years and 10 months of broadcast, the station regularly had problems, resulting in numerous management changes, especially in its early years. It also suffered from major financial cutbacks hampering its operations. Though on a stable footing by 1986 and winning its ratings battle with the BBC's Breakfast Time, within a year turmoil had ensued when industrial action hit the company.

Despite these setbacks, by the 1990s TV-am's flagship programme Good Morning Britain had become the most popular breakfast show on UK television. Following a change in the law regarding television franchising, the company lost its licence and was replaced by GMTV in 1993.

== Foundation ==
The Independent Broadcasting Authority (IBA) announced on 24 January 1980 that in the next ITV franchising round it would offer a national license for breakfast television. Eight applications were received and on 28 December 1980, the IBA announced it had awarded the breakfast franchise to TV-am.

Although the initial launch date was set for June 1983 to avoid clashing with the 1982 launch of Channel 4, the IBA allowed the station to bring forward its start date to 1 February 1983 in response to the launch of the BBC service Breakfast Time two weeks earlier.

This hurried start affected the company in two ways. Firstly, ITV had failed in its negotiations for royalties and rates for advertising on the new Channel 4 and the breakfast service with the actors' trade union, Equity. The union instructed its members to boycott the new station, which meant there was little or no revenue from advertising in the early days.

Secondly, it was believed that the BBC's breakfast service would be highbrow, focusing on news and analysis, so TV-am had developed its new service to match that. However, the BBC launched a lightweight, magazine-style programme that mimicked the style of United States breakfast television. With the launch of the BBC's Breakfast Time brought forward at short notice, this gave little time for TV-am to redevelop its plans.

TV-am was spearheaded by the so-called Famous Five who were not only lined up as presenters on the station, but were also shareholders: Michael Parkinson, David Frost (1983–92), Angela Rippon (1983), Anna Ford (1983) and Robert Kee. Esther Rantzen had originally been one of the station's 'star' line-up of presenter/shareholders, but pulled out in 1981 after the birth of her third child; she and the company agreed that the early morning starts would present a problem in her raising her child. She had also been persuaded by the BBC to continue producing and presenting That's Life! and conceded she did not want to give up the show, or worse, see it continue with another anchor.

There had been many difficulties for the other presenters in the run-up to launch. When the franchise was announced in December 1980, Rippon's contract with the BBC was about to expire, and was not renewed as a result of her new employment. This left her seeking freelance work before TV-am went on air. Ford was dismissed by ITN, which had been part of another consortium bidding for the breakfast contract. ITN had presented Ford as its female programme presenter as part of its bid, unaware that she was planning to defect to TV-am. ITN heavily criticised her disloyalty and said that her dishonesty had made its bid seem "ridiculous" to the IBA. ITN replaced Ford with Selina Scott, who herself landed a double blow to ITN when she defected to the BBC to present Breakfast Time towards the end of 1982. Michael Parkinson did remain with the BBC, which hoped to persuade him to stay as it had with Rantzen, but he finally left the corporation in 1982. A challenge for all the Famous Five came before the station launch when in an administrative error, the contracts for the five presenters were sent to the wrong individuals, which led Rippon to discover she was being paid £60,000 per year, considerably less than Anna Ford, who was being paid £145,000 (equivalent to £516,988 in 2025). The women also learnt that their male counterparts Frost and Parkinson were each being paid almost £250,000 (equivalent to £891,359 in 2025).

TV-am's headquarters and studios were at Breakfast Television Centre, Hawley Crescent, Camden Town, London. Designed by Terry Farrell and converted from a former car showroom, Henleys Rover, the building included a number of large plastic egg cups along its roofline facing Regent's Canal; these egg cups also served as the programme's closing credits copyright year identifier, with all previous years also kept on-screen behind the current year.

TV-am had two television studios. Studio A, 3,000 square feet, was home to the Good Morning Britain set. Studio B had a smaller version of the GMB set and was also used as the news studio.

Programmes originally ran from 6 am to 9:15 am, with Daybreak, then Good Morning, Britain filling weekday mornings. This was followed by a 10-minute interval before the start of the regional ITV franchises at 9:25 am. This interval was needed because the process of the switching the broadcast signals from TV-am to each regional company was still manual and this gap gave British Telecom the required time to complete this task. Shortly after TV-am's launch, the process was converted to allow automatic switching, which was introduced gradually throughout the network, and from the end of May 1983 the IBA extended TV-am's hours to 9:25 am to allow for continuous programming. At this point, Good Morning, Britain was reduced to a two-hour slot from 7 am to 9 am. The 9 am to 9:25 am section was relaunched as a female-orientated lifestyle magazine segment titled After Nine. Although TV-am was a separate broadcaster occupying the ITV network channel during the morning, from the late 1980s the ITV stations extended their hours to 6 am to provide 24-hour television, handing over to TV-am at 6 am.

== Difficult beginnings ==
While the BBC's Breakfast Time was successful, TV-am's early ratings were disappointing. Its high-minded and somewhat starchy approach, summed up in the phrase "mission to explain" (coined by chief executive Peter Jay) sat uneasily at that time of day, compared to the accessible magazine style of Breakfast Time, which mixed heavy news and light-hearted features, famously moving cabinet ministers, after a serious interview, to help with a cookery demonstration.

The first day of broadcasting from TV-am included an hour of news in Daybreak, a short film and an interview with Norman Tebbit about the current level of unemployment, a live comic strip called The World of Melanie Parker, and Through the Keyhole. Within two weeks of the launch; the ratings dropped sharply, within a month, the ratings fell again to just under 300,000. The company's weekend slot, presented by Michael Parkinson, initially became the only success for the station, largely because the BBC did not broadcast on weekend mornings. The Saturday editions drew 1.5 million viewers.

A number of changes were made on 28 February: Daybreak was reduced by 30 minutes and presented by Gavin Scott, while Good Morning Britain was moved 30 minutes earlier to start at 6:30 am, with Angela Rippon being moved from Daybreak to present alongside Anna Ford. The original Good Morning Britain team of Frost and Ford was intended to last 12 weeks, but in an attempt to reinvigorate the show, Frost voluntarily agreed to step down so that the female team of Ford and Rippon could spearhead the slot. After just one edition on air, Ford was struck with flu, with her returning the following week on 7 March. During the first week of the revised format, the viewer figures increased by 200,000, with Frost and Parkinson stepping in to cover for her. During the second week of both Rippon and Ford, figures continued to remain at a peak of 500,000. On 26 March, new figures were published, highlighting that TV-am had once again lost 100,000 up to the week before; however, ratings were still higher overall, compared to the end of February's figures.

A boardroom coup ensued on 18 March, when Peter Jay stepped aside allowing Jonathan Aitken, a sitting Conservative MP, to become chief executive of the station, after mounting pressure from investors who had demanded changes. On the same day, Angela Rippon and Anna Ford came out publicly to support Jay, calling the goings-on "treachery", unaware Jay had already left. Over the course of the next few days Aitken made it clear a number of changes were being looked at to improve the ratings including cutting the number of ad breaks, while also denying he wanted anyone to resign. Many officials, like those at the IBA, opposition parties, and even Aitken's own governing party were not happy at his appointment, as it may have interfered with TV-am's political freedom, with many demanding he give up the role or stop being a Member of Parliament. The IBA finally approved Aitken a few days later, but made its intention clear: his tenure was for a limited period only, and the IBA would keep an extra close eye on all the programmes during this period.

On 1 April (Good Friday), puppet Roland Rat made his first appearance; he was created by David Claridge and launched by TV-am children's editor Anne Wood to entertain younger viewers during the Easter holidays, which boosted the station's audience. Roland Rat is generally regarded as its saviour, being described as "the only rat to join a sinking ship". During the summer, when Breakfast Time hosts Frank Bough and Selina Scott were off, he helped take the audience from 100,000 to over a million and a half.

On 4 April, Greg Dyke became director of programmes to help overhaul the station's output. A day later sports presenter Nick Owen become one of the main presenters working one week each with Ford and Rippon initially only for the month of April The latter was castigated by viewers and the media for her open hostility to Owen on air. When he made an error in a link, Rippon stated "You see, it's not as easy as you think." During April, the live comic strip The World of Melanie Parker was axed.

On 14 April, Aitken's cousin Timothy Aitken became chief executive of the station due to the IBA rules regarding MPs operating a television station. This resulted in Rippon and Ford being sacked on 19 April, with no official reason given at that time; unofficially it was made clear both breached their contracts for their public support for Jay, while at the same time the sackings helped cut costs. Parkinson ended up in lengthy talks with Aitken over the issues and the sacking of his two former colleagues, which resulted in him becoming a director of the company and joining the board of management. As part of these talks, further members of staff who clashed with Parkinson would be removed. Ford encountered Jonathan Aitken at a party in Chelsea; in a parting shot over the terms of her dismissal, she threw her glass of wine in his face, saying of her action: "It was the only form of self-defence left to a woman when she has been so monstrously treated." A couple of days later both Rippon and Ford started procedures to sue TV-am; by October, the case was dropped after reaching an out of court settlement.

Lynda Berry was brought in as stop-gap measurement for six weeks, before Anne Diamond joined from the BBC to become Owen's new co-presenter from 6 June.

On 23 May, TV-am's new look started. Daybreak was axed, with Good Morning Britain extended to start at 6:25 am. Commander David Philpott was moved to present the weather at the weekends only, with Wincey Willis becoming the new weekday weather presenter, and a host of new features were introduced:

- Today's The Day with Jeremy Beadle
- An exercise spot with Lizzie Webb
- Cooking with John Eley, the Cooking Canon (Rustie Lee would later take over)
- Fishing correspondent, "Codfather" George Vella
- Nick Owen with Lynda Berry (later succeeded by Diamond), reading out the newspaper bingo numbers.

By the end of its first week, TV-am's ratings had doubled to 200,000.

Continuing low audiences brought further financial difficulties: the company was close to having its power supply disconnected; a London Electricity official arrived during a press conference with a warrant to cut off power for non-payment; and on numerous occasions, the presenters failed to receive their monthly wages, while the local newsagent stopped supplying the station with newspapers due to non-payment. TV-am spent the summer on the road, using the outside broadcast truck from various seaside resorts around the UK, and was presented by Chris Tarrant.

Michael Parkinson went to Australia in early June 1983 for the summer, with Henry Kelly taking over his weekend duties. David Frost was given the Sunday slot from 28 August, initially for eight weeks with the belief that Parkinson would return to his full duties in October. By November, Parkinson had returned; however, he was only given the Saturday slot after Frost had increased the number of viewers on Sundays. Parkinson finally left the station in early February 1984, while the company announced plans to cut over 40 jobs.

In September, TV-am finally joined the television contractors’ associations, which gave the additional benefit of providing cross-promotional content between the 15 regional ITV companies and TV-am. The continuing increase in viewership had still not resulted in an increase in advertising revenue, and throughout October, speculation arose the company would collapse at any second. The situation was resolved in November when a new refinance package come into effect with new shareholders including Ladbrokes and the owners of the Daily Express which injected new capital worth over £4.5 million into the company.

== Bruce Gyngell ==
Australian business tycoon Kerry Packer took a substantial minority interest in the company in early 1984, and in early May appointed his own chief executive, Bruce Gyngell, who was brought in to help make the company financially viable. Greg Dyke left within a few weeks of the appointment to take a new position with TVS. Ten days later, general manager Michael Moor also left the station. In July 1984, Michael Hollingsworth became the new programme controller, having previously worked for the BBC's Breakfast Time.

Gyngell pursued the same lightweight, populist approach that Dyke had forged to establish the station's viability, a model parodied later in a Guardian newspaper headline as "Snap, Crackle and Pap". The station overhauled its children's Saturday morning programme with Wide Awake Club, replacing Data Run and SPLAT as part of the cost-cutting by management.

The cost-cutting was brought sharply into focus in the Brighton hotel bombing on the Conservative cabinet in October 1984. The night before the terrorist attack, TV-am only had one camera crew covering the conference and it had been called back to London to cover the Wembley Central rail crash. When the blast occurred in the early hours, the BBC and ITN provided immediate coverage. TV-am's response was limited to a caption of reporter John Stapleton reporting over the phone, while the BBC were showing graphic coverage of the attack. Trade union agreements at the time meant that technical staff at the local ITV station TVS could not provide cover for another commercial television company, and TV-am's previous conflicts with ITN meant that the latter would not share its footage. The whole affair earned the company a severe rebuke from the IBA, which told the company to invest and improve its news coverage or it would lose its licence.

In an echo of the changes which had occurred in newspapers, Gyngell was determined to make use of technical developments in television in order to reduce staff and save money. He believed that the ease of use of modern broadcasting equipment meant that staffing levels could be reduced: ENG crews would no longer require a separate lighting technician (following a pattern familiar in Gyngell's native Australia), and technical personnel could be much reduced. This brought him into conflict with the broadcasting trade unions, but gained him support from Prime Minister Margaret Thatcher and her government. During 1986, TV-am became the most popular breakfast television service in the UK, as the BBC's Breakfast Time lost viewers. In November of that year, the magazine-style Breakfast Time took on a more heavyweight approach; and in 1989 the BBC replaced Breakfast Time entirely with a more in-depth and analytical news format called Breakfast News, reminiscent of the original format used by TV-am.

In the hurricane-force storms that hit England in October 1987, electrical power to the studios was lost and an emergency programme had to be transmitted from facilities at Thames Television's Euston Road centre, using reports from the crews of TV-am and those of ITN, TSW and TVS. All this notwithstanding, the programme continued to thrive. Eventually, Gyngell fired all of the locked-out technicians, replacing them with non-unionised labour from around the world.

=== Intra-industrial dispute ===
On 23 November 1987, technicians at the station went on a 24-hour strike. Management locked out the strikers, but stayed on air using non-technical staff to broadcast a skeleton service including, among other things, episodes of American series including Flipper, Batman and Happy Days.

Gyngell himself took to directing the show personally, and various secretaries (including Gyngell's own) operated cameras, when a reduced normal service resumed on 7 December. Although shambolic at times, this schedule turned out on occasions to be more popular than former programming, although not what would have been allowed to be broadcast under normal circumstances. Further discussions continued with the unions; however, on 16 February 1988, all the technicians were made redundant, with many of them being informed by an announcement made on News at Ten.

By 1990 TV-am was among the most successful television stations in the world, earning $37.7 million of profit on $130.5 million of revenue. It had up to 72% of the audience; in January 1992 2.4 million people watched TV-am, while 1.3 million watched BBC and 200,000 chose Channel 4.

== Law change and demise ==
In 1990, changes in broadcasting law meant that commercial television franchises were no longer allocated on merit or potential, but rather through a blind auction. Following these changes, the Independent Broadcasting Authority was replaced by a light touch regulator, the Independent Television Commission (ITC). TV-am was required to re-apply for its licence in May 1991. The ITV franchise results were announced on 16 October and the bid for £14.3m that TV-am had made was beaten by another consortium, Sunrise Television (renamed GMTV when it launched) which offered £36.4m. Ironically, in the years following its launch, GMTV approached the ITC to retrospectively obtain a reduction in this fee.

By February 1992 the first on-screen effects of the licence loss became obvious, with TV-am closing its in-house news service and contracting it out to Sky News for a one-off payment. Children's programming also suffered, with fewer appearances of Timmy Mallett, though Wacaday would continue during major school holidays until TV-am's close. Another impact was the abrupt cancellation after just six weeks of the Chris Evans-hosted Saturday morning strand TV-Mayhem, which had initially been commissioned for a 40-week run, and its replacement with presented-out-of-vision back-to-back cartoons strand Cartoon World on Saturdays from 8 am (extended to 7:30 am later in the year).

Margaret Thatcher, whose government had introduced the change to the allocation of commercial television franchises (but who had by then been replaced as prime minister by John Major), famously wrote to Bruce Gyngell, apologising for being partly responsible for TV-am losing its licence. Her letter read, in part: "I am ... heartbroken. I am only too painfully aware that I was responsible for the legislation." The letter was private but Gyngell made it public, which drew criticism from friends of the former prime minister.

=== Closure ===
The station's final broadcast ended on 31 December 1992 at 9:21 am. Credits over a black-and-white still of the station's cast and crew in the studio showed snapshot of their portraits as the screen faded ending with the caption: TV-am: 1 February 1983 – 31 December 1992.

This was then followed by the last commercial break after which there was no final appearance by the famous eggcups; they had been seen for the last time the day before. Instead, the final promotion was for GMTV which began broadcasting at 6am the following day.

While TV-am was an independent station and had used an expensive, purpose-owned custom-built studio complex at Camden Lock, GMTV used studio space at The London Studios owned by one of GMTV's shareholders, LWT.

==== The studios ====
Breakfast Television Centre in Camden Town was sold to MTV Networks in 1993, with the famous eggcups still standing on the roof of the building beside the Regent's Canal. As well as being used by MTV for the production of its programmes, MTV Studios, as they were known, were available for commercial hire within the TV industry. The TV-am lettering built into the fascia of the building was obscured – by being covered with discs – but were still partially visible until they were completely removed during further renovations in spring 2012.

In 1999, a fire broke out in a video suite, causing extensive damage to the first floor and roof of the building. Production studios and offices were undamaged, as were the eggcups.

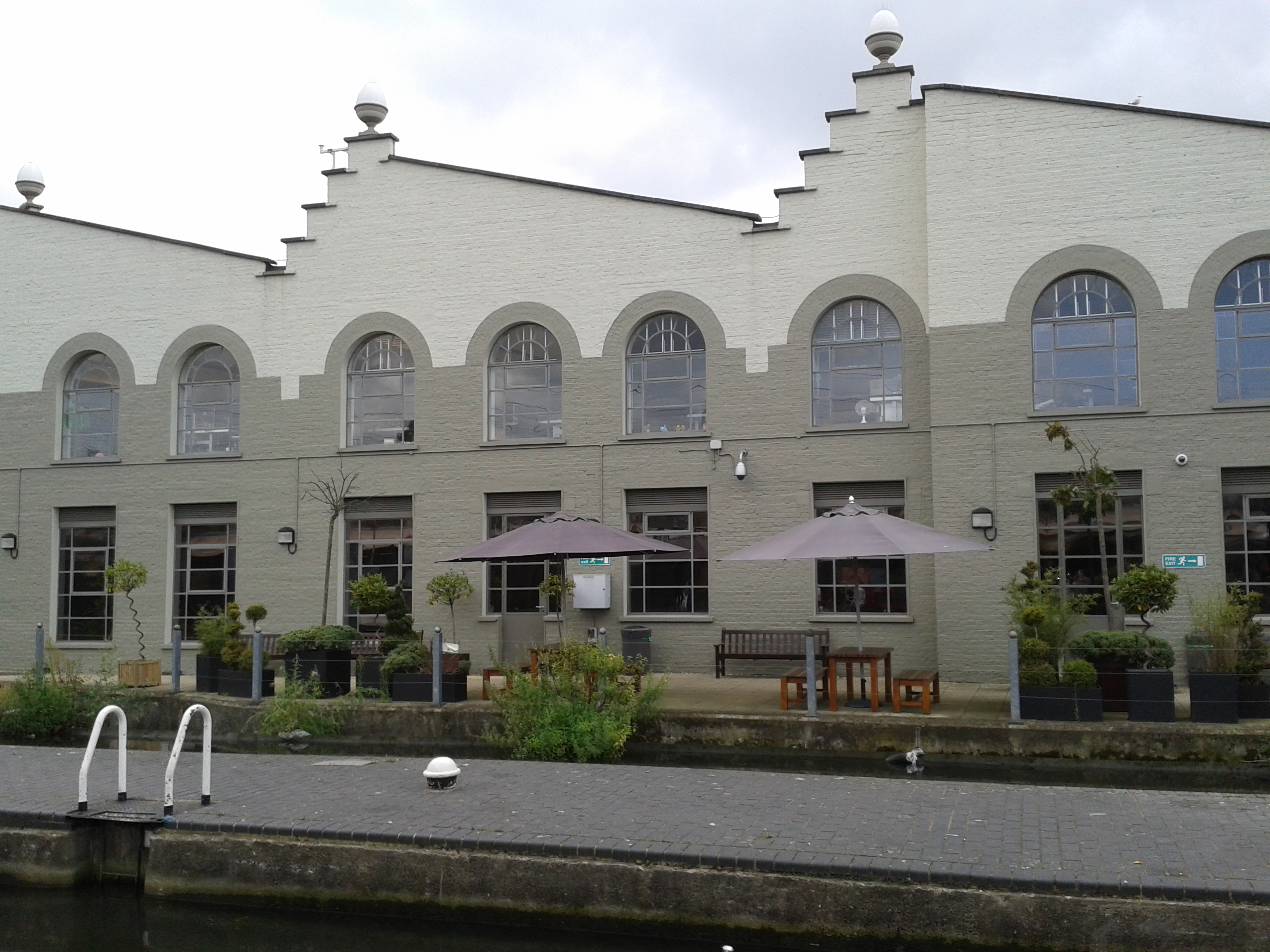
The rear of the studios after renovation in 2014. The "eggcups" are clearly visible.

In 2011, MTV Networks applied for permission to make changes to the building, primarily to remove some of the studios – which were in decreasing demand following changes in MTV's scheduling and commissioning practices – and replace these with modern office space. The rear of the building, facing Regent's Canal, was repainted grey rather than blue, but the structure – and the iconic eggcups – remained in place. The front of the building was more extensively redeveloped during 2012–13: the studio block, which had been the site of the original TV-am studios, was demolished and replaced with a new glazed-fronted office complex. The front 'courtyard' between the prior studio and office sections was renovated and reorganised, including the installation of a green wall. The office suite on the other side of the courtyard remained in place but was renovated, including the removal of the obscured-since-1993 'TVAM' lettering from the building fascia. MTV Networks continued to operate from the building during the rebuilding and renovation works, and following the construction of the expanded office space, it was able to move Comedy Central UK and Nickelodeon UK from their prior central London office complexes to Hawley Crescent.

==== Brand and programming ====
In August 1993, TV-am plc became Crockfords plc, since 1995 known as Capital Corporation Ltd, a gambling company which is currently non-trading.

The TV-am name and logo, and 15 registered trade marks, are now owned by journalist Ian White.

The archive of TV-am programmes made between 1983 and 1992 was taken over by Moving Image Communications Ltd, which recruited AP Archive as exclusive licensor of the TV-am footage library. Today, the archive is held and managed by the British Film Institute National Archive.

== Presenters ==
- Toni Arthur, 1983–1984, weekend Good Morning Britain presenter.
- Lisa Aziz, 1989–1992, newsreader, later joined Sky News.
- Jeni Barnett, host of Pick Of The Week, Postbag.
- Adrian Brown, reporter, newsreader, presenter of Good Morning Britain.
- Gyles Brandreth, host of Postbag.
- Tania Bryer, 1992, weather presenter.
- Kay Burley, 1985–1988, reporter, newsreader, presenter.
- Anne Diamond, 1983–90, presenter of Good Morning Britain and Anne Diamond on Sunday.
- Moya Doherty, reporter, presenter of After Nine.
- Diana Dors, 1983–1984, diet and later agony aunt.
- Maya Even 1989–1992, began her television career at TV-am in 1987, first as a researcher in the political unit and then as a producer and reporter from 1989.
- David Frost, Good Morning Britain (1983–84), The Sunday Programme (1985–86), Frost on Sunday (1986–92).
- Paul Gambaccini, 1983–1992, film critic.
- Jimmy Greaves, TV reviewer, presenter.
- Michael Hastings, 1988–1992, Good Morning Britain presenter.
- Gordon Honeycombe, 1984–1989, newsreader.
- Jayne Irving, 1983–1989, newsreader, presenter of Good Morning Britain and After Nine.
- Ulrika Jonsson, weather presenter.
- Derek Jameson, newspaper reviewer.
- Hillary Jones, resident doctor, host of After Nine.
- Richard Keys, 1983–1990, presenter of Good Morning Britain, The Morning Programme, sport presenter.
- Robert Kee, early presenter, Daybreak
- Henry Kelly, 1983–1987, weekend Good Morning Britain presenter.
- Lorraine Kelly, October 1984 – 1992, reporter, presenter of Good Morning Britain.
- Rustie Lee, consistently appeared on the show in the cooking segment.
- Mike Morris, 1983–1992, sport presenter, presenter of Good Morning Britain.
- Nick Owen, 1983–1986, sport presenter, presented Good Morning Britain alongside Anne Diamond.
- Michael Parkinson and Mary Parkinson, 1983, weekend programmes.
- Eve Pollard, showbusiness reporter.
- Angela Rippon, 1983, presenter of Daybreak and Good Morning Britain.
- Anneka Rice, 1985–1987, guest presenter, Good Morning Britain.
- Caroline Righton, April–October 1987, presenter.
- John Stapleton, 1983–1985, reporter and presenter.
- Kathy Tayler, 1989–1992, presenter of Good Morning Britain and After Nine.
- Chris Tarrant, roving reporter and host.
- Gordon Thomson, guest presenter, celebrity reporter.
- Lizzie Webb, aka 'Mad Lizzie', fitness guru.
- Lynn Faulds Wood, consumer affairs 1983–1984

=== Children's programmes ===
- Tommy Boyd – Wide Awake Club.
- Dick King-Smith, presenter, Rub-a-Dub-Tub.
- Timmy Mallett – Summer Run, Wide Awake Club, Hey, Hey It's Saturday and Wacaday.
- Michaela Strachan – Wide Awake Club, Hey, Hey It's Saturday and Wacaday.

== Children's programmes ==
=== Series made by TVAM ===
- Are You Awake Yet? (1982–1986)
- Cartoon World (November 1991 – December 1992)
- Dappledown Farm
- Data Run/Summer run
- Hey, Hey It's Saturday (1989–1991)
- Jungle Fun (1991–1992)
- Roland Rat
- Rub-a-Dub-Tub (1983–1984)
- SPLAT (1984)
- Top Banana (1991–1992)
- TV Mayhem (1991, was axed after six weeks)
- Wacaday (1985–1992)
- Wide Awake Club (1984–1989)

== See also ==
- Timeline of TV-am
- World in Action: "After The Break". ITV 1988.

ITV national franchise
New service	Breakfast television 1 February 1983 – 31 December 1992	Succeeded by GMTV
