= Anna Ford =

British journalist and television presenter

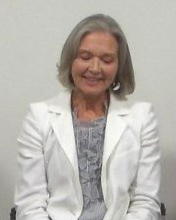
- Anna Ford, 2008
- Born: 2 October 1943 (age 83); Tewkesbury, Gloucestershire, England
- Occupations: Journalist; television presenter; newsreader
- Spouses: Alan Bittles (m. 1970, divorced); Mark Boxer (m. 1981; died 1988)
- Children: 2

Anna Ford (born 2 October 1943) is a British retired journalist, television presenter and newsreader. She first worked as a researcher, news reporter and later newsreader for Granada Television, ITN, and the BBC. Ford helped launch the British breakfast television broadcaster TV-am. She retired from broadcast news presenting in April 2006 and was a non-executive director of Sainsbury's until the end of 2012. Ford now lives in her home town of Tewkesbury, Gloucestershire.

== Early life ==
Ford was born in Tewkesbury, Gloucestershire, to parents who were both West End actors. Her father, John, had declined an offer from Samuel Goldwyn to work in Hollywood, and her mother, Jean (née Winstanley; sister of MP and broadcaster Michael Winstanley, Baron Winstanley) had worked with Alec Guinness. Her father later became ordained as an Anglican priest and took Ford and her four brothers to live at Eskdale in the Lake District. She went to primary school at St Ursula's School, Wigton, then to The Nelson Thomlinson Grammar School, Wigton, where she was a contemporary of Melvyn Bragg. After her father became the parish priest at St Martin's Church in Brampton she moved to the White House Grammar School. She also attended Minehead Grammar School in Somerset and lived in nearby Wootton Courtenay.

Ford received a BA degree in economics from the Victoria University of Manchester and was president of the university's students' union from 1966 to 1967.

== Career ==
Ford worked as a teacher for four years, including teaching Provisional Irish Republican Army prisoners at Her Majesty's Prison Maze in Northern Ireland for two years. She was later an Open University social studies tutor in Belfast for two years. Ford was thirty by the time that she joined Granada Television as a researcher in 1974. Initially, she was told she was too old to be a newsreader, but became a reporter and newsreader on Granada Reports. She joined the BBC in January 1977, but only after several months as security clearance from MI5 was required because she was then living with a former communist. This led to her BBC personnel file being marked with a "Christmas tree" symbol. Ford subsequently worked on Man Alive and Tomorrow's World.

In February 1978, Ford moved to ITN, and briefly faced legal threats from the BBC for breaking her contract. Future colleague Reginald Bosanquet said at the time: "I have never been averse to working with ladies ... I do not know Anna but I have heard that she is a very competent and professional lady", Ford and he formed a good professional relationship. Ford began presenting ITV's News at One in March and later the 5:45 pm bulletin, but within two months had become the first female newscaster on News at Ten.

In 1979, Ford appeared in a skit along with John Cleese and Terry Jones of the Monty Python troupe as part of "The Amnesty International Comedy Gala", a comedy programme performed at Her Majesty's Theatre, Haymarket, London. The film version is called "The Secret Policeman's Ball".

In 1981, she left ITN to join the presenting team of the soon-to-launch TV-am. ITN were bidding for the breakfast franchise themselves and had positioned Ford as the lead anchor in their bid, unaware that she was involved with another bidder. When her subterfuge was exposed, ITN immediately terminated her contract and publicly criticized her dishonesty and disloyalty. Her tenure at TV-am was short lived in part due to fierce competition from the BBC's casually styled Breakfast Time. The loss of viewers resulted in a relaunch which was perceived as "dumbing-down" of the station, and only three months after the station's launch, Ford was dismissed from TV-am partly due to her on-air support for chairman Peter Jay (who had already resigned) and partly because she refused to stand down from Good Morning Britain when the ratings slumped. Ford was involved in an incident at a party in which she threw her wine over Jonathan Aitken to express her outrage over his involvement in her sacking from the channel.

Ford re-joined the BBC in summer 1986, firstly to cover for Terry Wogan in June, and other minor roles. From January 1987 Anna was given her own programme "Network" in which members of the public were able to discuss issues with BBC management. In October 1987, Ford became a television presenter for the government-sponsored training scheme Open College. She became part of the presentation team for both BBC One's Six O'Clock News from February 1989 and the BBC Radio 4 Today in 1993. From 1999, she fronted the relaunched One O'Clock News.

On 30 October 2005, Ford announced she would retire from broadcasting in April 2006 to pursue other interests while she "still has the interest and energy". She also talked about ageism, stating:

I might have been shovelled off into News 24 to the sort of graveyard shift, and I wouldn't have wanted to do that because it wouldn't have interested me. I think when you reflect on the people who they're (the BBC) bringing in and they're all much younger. I think they are being brought in because they are younger. I think that's specifically one of the reasons why they're being employed."

Ford presented her last One O'Clock News on 27 April 2006, signing off by introducing a compilation of clips of her career. On 2 May 2006, J Sainsbury plc, the UK supermarket group, announced Ford was joining the company as a non-executive director. She is the Chair of Sainsbury's board's Corporate Responsibility Committee.

=== Academia ===
On 17 December 2001, Ford was installed as Chancellor of the Victoria University of Manchester. When the Victoria University of Manchester merged with the University of Manchester Institute of Science and Technology (UMIST) on 1 October 2004 to create the new University of Manchester, she became its Co-Chancellor along with Sir Terry Leahy (the former Chancellor of UMIST). She completed her term and Tom Bloxham succeeded her as sole Chancellor on 1 August 2008.

On 22 April 2006, Ford received an honorary doctorate from the University of St Andrews, nominated by Sir Menzies Campbell.

=== Other work ===
Ford is one of many guest hosts to have taken the chair for the satirical news quiz Have I Got News for You.

== Personal life ==
Ford had an early marriage to Alan Bittles (1970–div), although this was dissolved before her television career began. In the late 1970s, she was briefly engaged to Jon Snow, a colleague at ITN. She married the magazine editor and cartoonist Mark Boxer in 1981; with whom she had two daughters, before he died of a brain tumour in 1988 at their home in Brentford, Greater London.

She was briefly engaged in 2000 to former astronaut David Scott, the seventh man to walk on the Moon. Ford became the subject of news stories in August 2001, when she lost a high-profile court case. She claimed unsuccessfully that photographs of her in a bikini with Scott, taken by a press photographer in Majorca with a powerful zoom lens and published in the British media, constituted an invasion of her privacy.

In a letter to The Guardian in February 2010, Ford accused Martin Amis (a friend of her late husband Mark Boxer) of having neglected his duties as godfather to one of her daughters and also having been disrespectful to Boxer at the time of his death. Amis rejected her allegations in a reply, but accepted that he had been remiss in his duties as godfather.

== Filmography ==
Year	Title	Role	Notes
1982	Who Dares Wins	Newscaster #1	
