= Daybreak (1983 TV series) =

Early morning news programme on TV-am

Daybreak is a short-lived early morning news programme on the former United Kingdom breakfast station TV-am. It originally ran from 06:00 to 07:00 with an emphasis on news stories. The first edition was broadcast on the TV-am launch date of 1 February 1983. Daybreak was presented by Robert Kee and Angela Rippon who both took turns in presenting.

As TV-am's viewing figures fell rapidly after its launch, and major shake ups took place, Daybreak was cut back to 30 minutes from 28 February 1983. Robert Kee and Angela Rippon were both replaced, with Gavin Scot (Weekdays) and Lynda Barry (weekends).

Daybreak was then cut to only 15 minutes, as well as moving to a green screen studio. Daybreak was axed on Monday 23 May 1983.

The name was revived in 2010 for ITV's replacement for GMTV. It lasted for four years.
