= Richard Keys =

British TV sports presenter (born 1957)

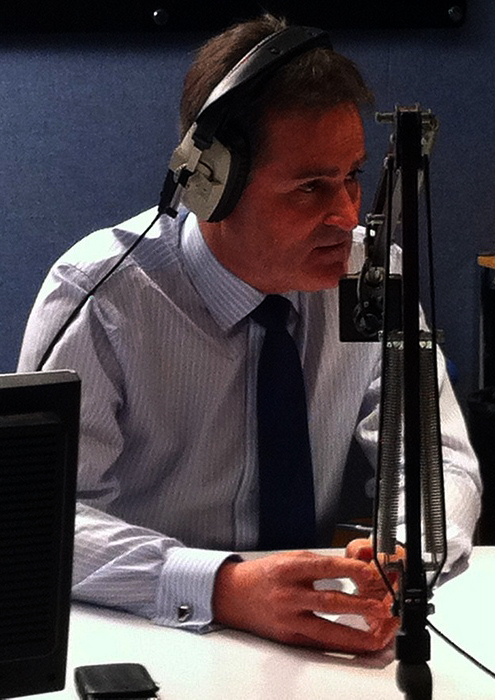
- Keys in 2011
- Born: 23 April 1957 (age 69); Coventry, Warwickshire, England
- Occupation: Sports reporter
- Years active: 1976–present
- Television: TV-am; Sky Sports; Talksport; Al Jazeera; BeIN Sports
- Spouse(s): Julia Keys (m. 1982, divorced) Lucie Rose (m. 2023)
- Children: 2
- Website: richardajkeys.com

Richard Keys (born 23 April 1957) is an English sports presenter who has worked for BBC, ITV, Channel 4, Sky UK, Talksport, Al Jazeera, Fox Sports, ESPN Star Sports and BeIN Sports; he has presented many top-level football matches.

== Career ==
His career started in London in 1976 when he began working for the Fleet Street Sports Agency Hayter's until 1978, when he moved to Liverpool and worked at Radio City as a football commentator.

In 1982, he moved to Manchester to work at Piccadilly Radio as sports editor and football commentator. In 1984 Keys moved back to London, where he joined the ITV network as one of the main anchors of breakfast show TV-am. While working at TV-am he also commentated on football matches for ITV and cycling for Channel 4, including two Tours de France.

Keys was one of the presenters for the Sports Channel on British Satellite Broadcasting (BSB) in spring 1990. When BSB merged with Sky in 1991, the channel was renamed Sky Sports. He presented TV-am for the last time on 28 December 1990 before leaving for Sky Sports.

He presented Sky Sports coverage of Premier League football since the league's inception in 1992. He was the presenter of the flagship Super Sunday and also presented Sky's Monday Night Football, which coincided with Sky gaining rights for the UEFA Champions League. Later he fronted all of Sky Sports' Champions League coverage.

In 2008, Keys also presented the UEFA Euro 2008 for Al Jazeera Sports.

=== Departure from Sky Sports ===
In January 2011, Keys left Sky Sports after making derogatory comments about female assistant referee Sian Massey. His off-air comments about Massey and the fitness of women to officiate at football matches were recorded and leaked. Further clips were leaked showing co-presenter Andy Gray and Keys behaving in a sexist manner.

Keys apologised and said: "Prehistoric banter isn't acceptable in the modern world. I accept that. We failed to change when the world has changed."

Keys later joined talkSPORT radio, where he presented on Saturday evenings. Later in 2011, Keys returned to television broadcasting launching the boxing channel BoxNation with boxing promoter Frank Warren.

=== Al Jazeera, beIN Sports and Talksport ===
In June 2013, Al Jazeera agreed a contract with Keys and Andy Gray. They present English and European football coverage from Doha, Qatar, including the Premier League, UEFA Champions League, and FA Cup.

Coverage started for the 2013–14 season while they continued to present their Talksport show from Qatar.

Keys and Gray are the mainstays of the football coverage on BeIN Sports channels, which broadcasts all 380 Premier League games per season.

Since 2013, Keys has maintained a blog on his personal website that is often referenced in sports media.

In early February 2026 news broke that Keys and Gray are expected to leave beIN at the end of the current Premier League season. They both departed beIN Sports at the conclusion of the UEFA Champions League Final in May.

== Personal life ==
From the age of four, Keys had a passion for football, ever since his father took him to watch Coventry City play Swansea Town in the old Third Division. He was educated at the now-defunct Whitley Abbey Comprehensive School, where he was head boy.

Richard Keys married his first wife Julia in 1982 and they had two children together. Julia filed for divorce in 2016 due to Richard Keys's alleged infidelity.

In November 2000, Keys was heard to make a racially motivated comment about footballer David Johnson while broadcasting live on a Sky test channel. While discussing Johnson's potential eligibility to play for the Scotland national team with pundits Ray Wilkins and Graeme Souness, Keys referred to Johnson as a "choco jocko". The incident was brought to the public eye in February 2011, following Keys' departure from Sky for various other inappropriate remarks.

In June 2023, Keys married Lucie Rose, a lawyer 32 years his junior. It has been alleged that Lucie was his daughter's best friend, but he has denied this.

== Awards ==
In 2002, Keys received an honorary doctorate from Coventry University for outstanding services to sports broadcasting.

In 2012, Keys and Andy Gray received the best sports programme prize for their talkSPORT show at the Sony Radio Academy Awards.

== Charity work ==
Keys and Geoff Shreeves have helped to raise money for Nordoff-Robbins, a musical charity for children with autism.

Keys is a patron of the Willow Foundation, a charity for people with special needs, founded by the former Arsenal goalkeeper Bob Wilson in memory of his late daughter.
