= Anne Diamond =

British journalist and broadcaster (born 1954)

Anne Diamond OBE
- Born: Anne Margaret Diamond; 8 September 1954 (age 72); Birmingham, Warwickshire, England
- Occupations: Broadcaster; journalist
- Years active: 1979–present
- Spouse: Mike Hollingsworth (m. 1989; div. 1999)
- Children: 5

Anne Margaret Diamond (born 8 September 1954) is a British journalist, broadcaster, and children's health campaigner. She co-hosts the weekend breakfast show on GB News with Stephen Dixon. She hosted Good Morning Britain for TV-am and co-hosted Good Morning with Anne and Nick with Nick Owen for BBC One.

In 1991, following the death of her third son Sebastian, Diamond successfully campaigned for research into cot death. The campaign, which she co-founded, is reported to have cut the UK's incidence of cot death from over 2,000 a year to approximately 300. In 2023, she was made an OBE for her service to children's health and is the first non-medic to hold the Royal College of Paediatrics College Medal.

Diamond has also worked for LBC, Radio Oxford, BBC London, BBC Berkshire, and is a regular columnist for the various UK newspapers. She made regular appearances on Channel 5's topical discussion show The Wright Stuff and its successor, Jeremy Vine.

== Early life and career ==
Diamond was born on 8 September 1954 at Loveday St Maternity Hospital in Birmingham, Warwickshire.

Her parents were of Irish ancestry, although her father was brought up by his mother in Greenock, Scotland after his father went to Canada. Her mother was a nurse. She was brought up on Clerkenwell Crescent in Great Malvern, Worcestershire, in a house owned by the MoD. She attended the prep school Hillside School, Malvern before the age of 11, followed by Worcester Grammar School for Girls.

Diamond worked at a Butlins holiday camp as a redcoat and chalet-maid.

== Career ==
=== Television ===
Diamond began her television career with BBC West in Bristol, before moving over to ATV Today as a reporter and newsreader in 1979. When ATV became Central Television in 1982, she was paired up with Nick Owen, to present the new East Midlands edition of Central News. The launch of the Nottingham-based service was initially delayed for a month, but then postponed indefinitely. With no end in sight to the dispute, Diamond left to join ITN before re-joining the BBC, becoming a reporter on the nightly programme Nationwide and a presenter on BBC News After Noon.

On Monday 6 June 1983, Diamond joined TV-am. Greg Dyke, the newly appointed programme director, spoke with Nick Owen about replacements for sacked presenters Anna Ford and Angela Rippon. Owen suggested Diamond, and later that evening they met in a pub. Six weeks later Diamond joined the station. On breakfast television, she received hundreds of letters a day, mostly from teenage males, and males under 23, asking her out on a date.

Diamond left TV-am in 1990, to work full-time on TV Weekly, first produced by TVS and later by Topical Television, which she had presented since 1989. The programme looked behind the scenes of various television programmes and interviewed various personalities from in front and behind the camera. Diamond was rejoined with Nick Owen to present the BBC daytime show Good Morning with Anne and Nick, which ran four years against ITV's This Morning from 1992 till 1996.

In 2002, Diamond took part in the second series of Celebrity Big Brother, and was the second person to be evicted.

In 2003 Diamond became a regular panellist and stand-in presenter on The Wright Stuff, and from 2018 on its successor Jeremy Vine. On occasion Diamond’s role on the show has caused confusion with one caller believing her to be a fish and chip shop owner and subsequently proceeded to attempt to place an order.

During 2008, Diamond became involved in co-developing a jewellery range, which she marketed on shopping channel QVC under her own name brand. She joined ITV's lunchtime chat show Loose Women as a regular panellist on 14 October 2016 after impressing bosses when she previously appeared the week before as a guest. She departed the show in August 2018, in line with her new role as the sole stand-in presenter for Jeremy Vine. In 2018, she appeared in Channel 5's Costa Del Celebrity.

Diamond was a regular reviewer of the newspapers for Sky News on Sunday mornings.

In 2022, Diamond joined GB News to host the weekend breakfast show with Stephen Dixon.

=== Radio ===
In the late 1990s, she presented the breakfast show on the London radio station LBC, variously with Nicholas Lloyd and Tommy Boyd. After a few months presenting her own lunchtime show in 1999, she left the station.

In 2001, she spent a week on The Wright Stuff, and was welcomed back in 2003 after Celebrity Big Brother and has been there to the present day. In 2002, she also returned to television, appearing in Celebrity Big Brother. In October 2004, she joined BBC Radio Oxford, presenting the weekday breakfast programme. In 2006, she left BBC Radio Oxford, presenting her last breakfast programme on 17 March 2006, her replacement being Sybil Ruscoe. Much had been made on the breakfast programme of "Diamond's Dieting Buddies", a scheme whereby Diamond and listeners to the station in 2006 who wanted to lose weight would give one another moral support.

Diamond presented the mid-morning programme on BBC Radio Berkshire and kept a regular blog on the BBC website until 2015.

=== Pantomime ===
Diamond has appeared in pantomimes including playing the Wicked Queen in Snow White at Stoke-on-Trent in 2005, alongside Ken Morley and Sooty. She said that she thoroughly enjoyed the experience.

== Campaigning ==
=== Cot death ===
Diamond became involved in raising awareness of Sudden Infant Death Syndrome (SIDS, also known as "cot death"), after her son Sebastian died from the syndrome in 1991. She fronted "Back to Sleep", a campaign telling parents to ensure that babies slept on their backs. Since then incidents of SIDS in the United Kingdom fell from more than 2,000 per year to around 300, a drop which has been attributed to the campaign. Diamond was awarded the Gold Medal of the Royal College of Paediatrics and Child Health, the only time it had been awarded to a non-medic.

Diamond spoke out over the cot death and baby-swap storyline in the BBC One soap opera EastEnders, featuring characters Kat Moon and Ronnie Branning. "I think it's crass what they've done," she told ITV's Daybreak breakfast programme, calling the plot "tacky sensationalism". There were many complaints about the episode after it was broadcast on New Year's Eve.

FSID named Diamond as their Anniversary Patron for their 40th anniversary in 2011.

=== Video game violence ===
On 28 March 2008, in an article for the Daily Mail tabloid newspaper, Diamond contributed to an article concerning violence in video games where she is quoted as saying that the game Resident Evil 4 "shouldn't be allowed to be sold, even to adults".

=== Leveson Inquiry ===
Diamond has been featured in numerous stories in the British tabloid press since the mid-1980s. On 28 November 2011, she gave evidence at the Leveson Inquiry into the culture, practice and ethics of the press. She gave detailed accounts of intrusion by journalists into her life and her dealings with tabloid newspapers.

== Honours ==
Diamond was appointed Officer of the Order of the British Empire (OBE) in the 2023 New Year Honours for services to public health and charity.

She is the first non-medic to be awarded the Gold Medal of the Royal College of Paediatrics and Child Health.

== Personal life ==
Diamond began an affair with Mike Hollingsworth in the mid-1980s while he was married to his first wife. They married in 1989 following the birth of their second child, and went on to have three more children together. Their third child, Sebastian, died of Sudden Infant Death Syndrome (SIDS) when he was three months old. Diamond and Hollingsworth separated in 1998 after they both had numerous affairs and they divorced in 1999.

Diamond is a railway modeller.

In June 2023, Diamond announced that she had been diagnosed with breast cancer. As part of her treatment, she underwent a double mastectomy and was having "intensive radiotherapy".
