= Breakfast Television Centre =

Former HQ of TV-am in Camden, London

- Eggcup House
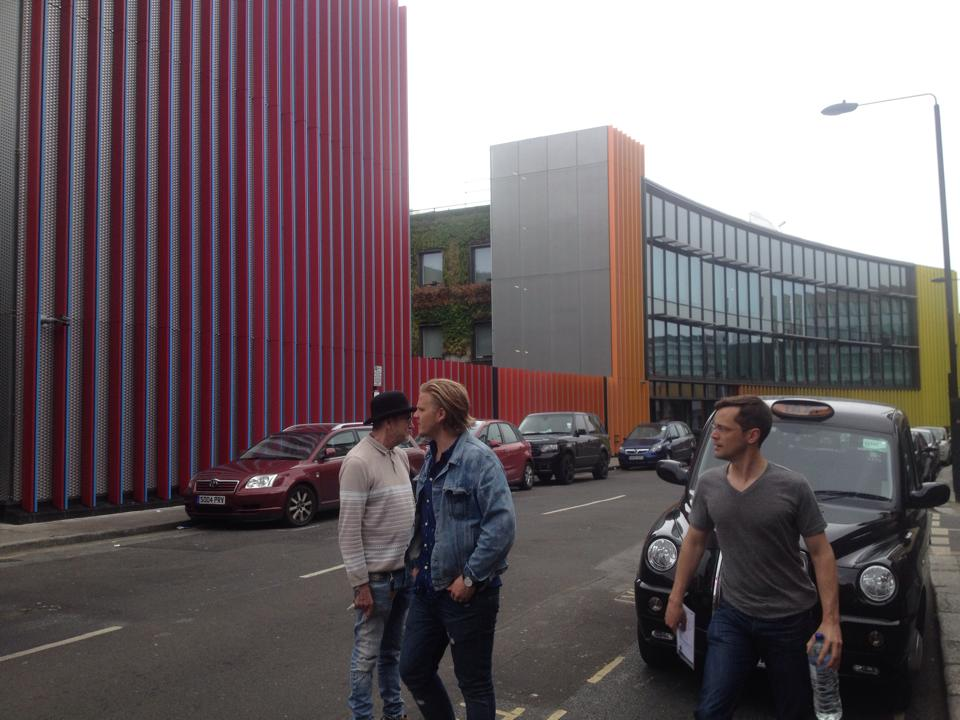
- MTV Europe Headquarters in Camden Town as seen in 2015

- Location within Greater London

General information
- Type: Television broadcast facilities
- Location: South of Camden Lock, London., 17–29 Hawley Crescent London NW1 8TT, United Kingdom
- Coordinates: 51.541107°N 0.143351°W
- Completed: August 1981
- Inaugurated: August 1981
- Renovated: 2012–2013
- Owner: TV-am (1983–1993); Paramount (1993–2026); Skydance (2026-Present)

Technical details
- Floor count: 4 (from ground floor)

Design and construction
- Architect: Sir Terry Farrell
- Architecture firm: Farrells

Breakfast Television Centre is the former headquarters of TV-am in Camden Town, London, which is now the European headquarters of Skydance. It was converted from a former car showroom in 1981 to a design by Sir Terry Farrell, and came to be known as Eggcup House because of plastic eggcups on the roof. It has since been extensively renovated. As a Paramount subsidiary, UK broadcaster Channel 5 has its headquarters in the building.

== History ==
In March 1981, a former car showroom was renovated for the TV-am studios. Sir Terry Farrell won the commission; his design became known for its vibrant postmodernism. There were 'TVAM' letters coming out of the wall, a sunrise archway over the entrance into the forecourt, and a number of plastic egg-cups on the edge of the roof facing the Regent's Canal, which led to the nickname 'Eggcup House'. The studios were used throughout TV-am's lifetime as a television network until 31 December 1992, when the studios and TV-am closed.

=== Sale to MTV Europe ===
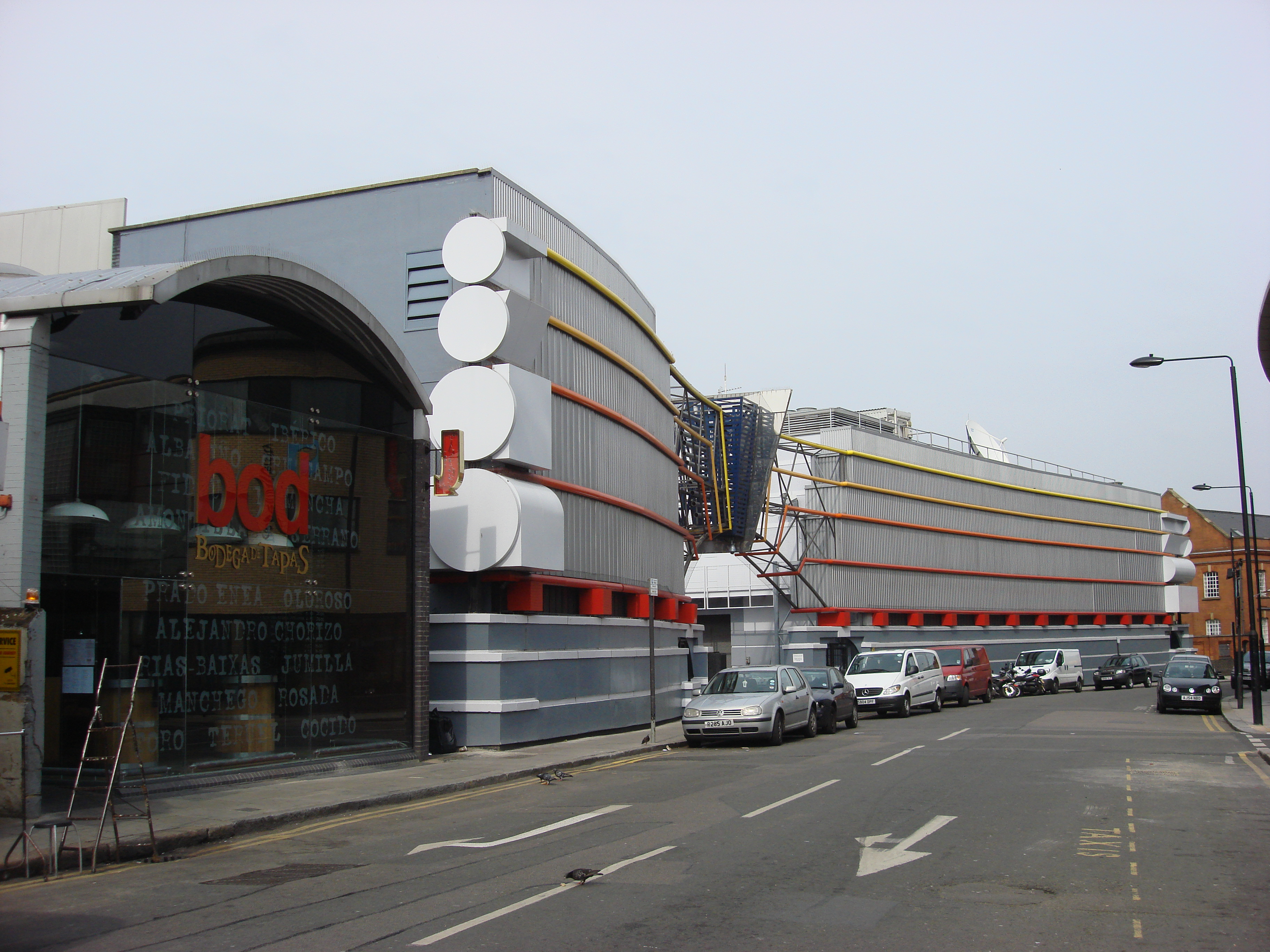
Former TV-am studios in Camden Lock. The TV-am lettering down the side of the fascia covered with discs in 1993.

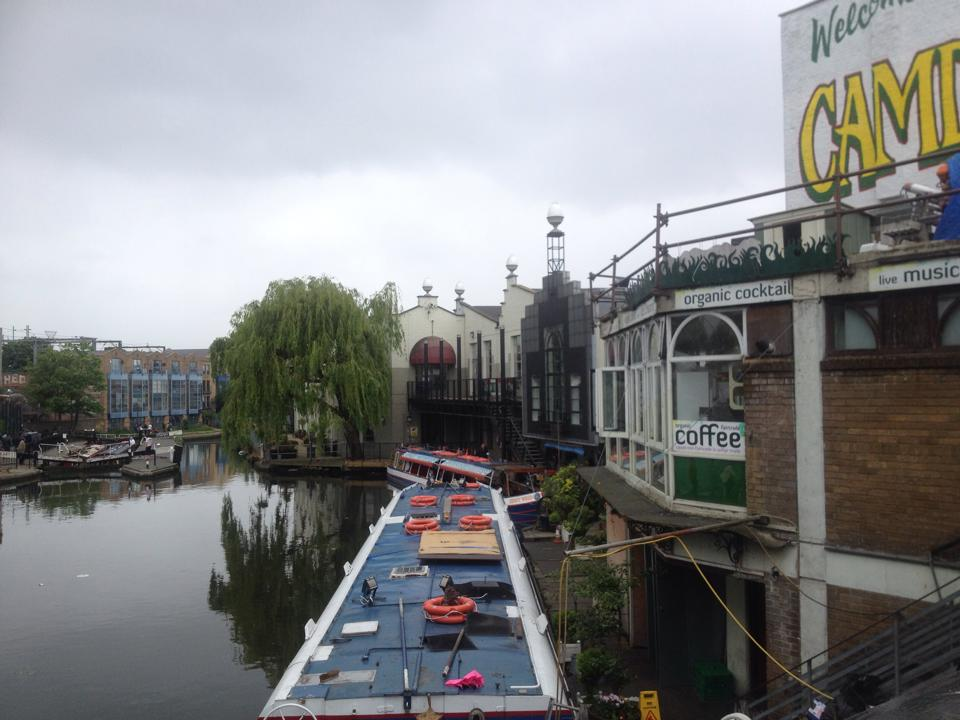
Camden Lock showing the TV-am eggcups after refurbishment

Breakfast Television Centre was sold to MTV Europe in 1993. MTV stated that extra studios were available for commercial hire. The TV-am lettering built into the fascia of the building was covered over with discs, but the eggcups remained on the roof.

In fact, during some of the earlier "live" MTV segments, based within the building, the very distinct former TV-am reception areas and non-studio space was used.

=== Fire ===
On 15 April 1999 a fire swept through the studios. MTV was forced to air emergency tapes and then came off the air when the electricity was switched off. 40 firefighters worked on the fire for three hours. The roof and parts of the first floor were destroyed, but the exterior was largely undamaged. The fire was believed to have been started by an electrical fault; no one was injured.

=== Renovation ===
In 2011, MTV Networks wanted to make changes to the building, primarily to remove some of the studios and replace them with modern office space. The rear of the building, facing the Regent's Canal, was repainted grey rather than blue, but the structure and the eggcups remained in place. The eggcups that overlook Regent's Canal were also repainted after years of damage and a large quantity of paint peeling. They were painted over the familiar blue and white eggcups to grey and white, matching the style of the renovated building. The front of the building was more extensively redeveloped during 2012–2013: the studio block, which had been the site of the original TV-am studios, was demolished, and replaced with a new glazed-fronted office complex. The courtyard between the prior studio and office sections was renovated and reorganised, including the installation of a green wall covering 3280 sq. ft. (305m²) in 2013.

In 2016, the original green wall that Viacom commissioned during the major overhaul of the building was renovated once again, building over the original car park and area to create more studio and office space. This section of the building remains a green wall but it covers over the vibrant panels at the front.
