= Wide Awake Club =

- Presented by: Timmy Mallett; Arabella Warner; James Baker; Tommy Boyd; Michaela Strachan
- Country of origin: United Kingdom

Production
- Running time: 30 min.

Original release
- Network: TV-am (ITV)
- Release: 13 October 1984 – 1989

Related
- Wacaday (1985 – 1992)

Wide Awake Club (often abbreviated to WAC) is a children's television series that was broadcast in the United Kingdom on the breakfast television channel TV-am between 1984 and 1989.

== History ==
Wide Awake Club started on Saturday 13 October 1984, broadcasting for an hour each Saturday morning at 8.30 am as TV-am's flagship kids series. It replaced two separate shows, Data Run and SPLAT which had been created by Ragdoll's Anne Wood then as Head of Children's Programmes. The change to Wide Awake Club was part of cost cutting by management and was devised by producer Nick Wilson.

WAC was presented by Timmy Mallett, Arabella Warner and James Baker, with Tommy Boyd joining in February 1985 and Michaela Strachan in August 1986 – all newcomers to television, except Boyd who had previously presented Magpie and Mallett who had presented the Oxford Road Show.

The live programme combined comedy, games, celebrity guests, competitions and viewer interaction. There were also more educational features, including visiting experts such as Carol Vorderman for the science slot, and attempts to explain historical and contemporary events like the Cold War. A spelling contest, 'Bonk’n’Boob' was praised by teachers for encouraging children to learn to spell properly. The show also launched the career of Mike Myers, later a major Hollywood star, who made guest appearances with Neil Mullarkey on the show for a brief time, parodying the show's title in his segment "Sound Asleep Club", in which he sported pyjamas and a "bed-head" hairstyle. His roles included making earrings out of spoons, tape and string, as well as making a glass of water in a cookery section.

When Wide Awake Club returned after its summer break on Saturday, 14 September 1985, the series was extended to broadcast for almost two hours from 7.30 am until 9.25 am.

The programme was so successful that it launched two spin-offs: Wacaday, a programme for holiday mornings presented solely by Timmy Mallett (joined by Terry a puppet during its first series and Michaela Strachan for later editions) that became even more successful than its parent, and WAC Extra, a Sunday morning version of the show. Both Wide Awake Club and Wacaday introduced the Wacawave, done by making a 'w', by putting one's thumbs together, and waving.

Meanwhile, Wide Awake Club continued for many years with only minor changes to the format until 9 September 1989 when it was relaunched as WAC '90 and the broadcast location moving to Granada's studios in Manchester (as opposed to TV-am's in London). However, the Wide Awake Club franchise continued as Wacaday until TV-am lost its franchise in 1992.

== Programming ==
- Jem (1987–late 80's)
- Transformers -
- M.A.S.K.
- Challenge of the GoBots
- Batman
- Flipper
- Happy Days
- The Shoe People
