= Digital television in the United Kingdom =

Overview of UK digital TV platforms

There are four major forms of digital television (DTV) broadcast in the United Kingdom: a direct-to-home satellite service from the Astra 28.2°E satellites provided by Sky UK, a cable television service provided by Virgin Media (known as Virgin TV); a free-to-air satellite service called Freesat; and a free-to-air digital terrestrial service called Freeview. In addition, an IPTV system known as BT TV is provided by BT. Individual access methods vary throughout the country. 77% of the United Kingdom has access to HDTV via terrestrial digital television. Satellite is the only source of HDTV broadcast available for the remaining 23%.

== Major forms of broadcast DTV ==
=== Terrestrial ===
The initial attempt at launching a digital terrestrial broadcasting service, ONdigital (later called ITV Digital), was unsuccessful and the company went into liquidation. Some observers have argued that this failure stemmed from the Government's eagerness in having sold off too much TV spectrum to launch Channel 5 (the last UK terrestrial analogue channel), and ONdigital's short-sightedness in over-extending its use of available bandwidth: using poor signal encoding to maintain compatibility with early set-top boxes, optimising their broadcasts for capacity rather than reliability, and cramming too many channels into the available bandwidth.

ITV Digital was replaced in late 2002 by Freeview, which uses the same DVB-T technology, but with higher levels of error correction and more robust (but lower-capacity) modulation on the "Public Service" multiplexes in an attempt to counter the reception problems which dogged its predecessor. Rather than concentrating on Pay TV services, Freeview uses the available capacity to provide a free-to-air service that includes all the existing five free-to-air analogue terrestrial channels and about twenty new digital channels. All services are transmitted in standard definition—576i in the UK—many using an anamorphic widescreen format.

31 March 2004 saw the return of a limited pay-television offering to the digital terrestrial platform with the launch of Top Up TV. This new service is designed to appeal to those who do not want to pay the higher subscription fees that Sky Television and the Cable networks demanded. The service carries some of the UK's most watched channels including the Discovery Channel, UKTV Gold, Discovery Real Time, British Eurosport and Cartoon Network. The 10 channels are split into five different slots and broadcast for only part of the day. In October 2006, Top Up TV became Top Up TV Anytime, taking advantage of the increase in the popularity of PVRs, and its limited channel space. Now over 100 programs are broadcast overnight and added to the box's hard disk, so that it may be watched at any time. Channels that joined the service include MTV, Nickelodeon and Hallmark Channel.

2005 saw the first areas of the United Kingdom losing their analogue signal in a pilot test. The residents of Ferryside and Llansteffan in Carmarthenshire, Wales who had not already upgraded to digital television were given a free set-top box to receive the Freeview television service, which includes Channel 4 (previously unavailable terrestrially from transmitters in Wales) and S4C~2, which broadcasts sessions of the National Assembly for Wales. Digital transmissions for this pilot commenced in December 2004, at which time a message was added to the analogue picture advising viewers that the analogue services would end in February 2005. The pilot paved the way for full switch-over to digital television signals throughout the United Kingdom by the Government's deadline of 2012.

The year 2005 also saw the announcement by Ofcom of the proposed analogue switch off plans for the UK. It is proposed that the switch off would progress on an ITV region by region basis starting in 2008 starting in the Border Television region and ending in the Channel Television region in 2012. The coverage of the three public service multiplexes will be the same as that enjoyed by the current analogue TV stations, while the three commercial multiplexes will cover approximately 90% of the UK population. To improve long standing interference issues in the Meridian and Anglia franchise areas a small number of new transmitters will be brought into service when those regions are converted in 2010 and 2011. These plans were confirmed by the Secretary of State for Culture, Tessa Jowell, on 15 September 2005. .

==== Freeview HD ====
Freeview HD launched in December 2009, from the Crystal Palace and Winter Hill transmitters, to coincide with digital switchover at the latter. Receivers did not, however, appear in the shops until February 2010. BBC HD, ITV HD, BBC One HD and Channel 4 HD are the currently available terrestrial HDTV channels. The broadcast mode is DVB-T2, using MPEG4 encoding.

The BBC, ITV, Channel 4 and Channel 5 ran terrestrial HDTV trials involving 450 homes in the London area during June–December 2006 on locally unused frequencies . As part of this trial, the BBC broadcast BBC HD free to air. The trial homes received an HD-capable set-top box; the services could also be received and played back by a PC equipped with a DVB-T card that is within range (as the broadcast is not encrypted) using a software H.264 decoder.

=== Cable ===
Digital cable in the United Kingdom is available through Virgin Media and several local cable companies.

Trials of the UK's first HDTV service began on 2 December 2005. Telewest, a cable TV company now part of Virgin Media, distributed HDTV programs to 400 customers in the south London area. Following the merger of NTL & Telewest and the creation of Virgin Media, HDTV was rolled out across the network, including former NTL areas. The service is provided via a personal video recorder, branded as V+ and formally known as TV Drive.

=== Satellite ===
On 1 November 2005 ITV turned off encryption on all of its satellite based signals, following the lead from the BBC. These transmissions are on a limited spotbeam which is aimed primarily towards the United Kingdom, via the Astra 2D satellite located at 28.2° east. This theoretically limits reception to the UK, Ireland, Iceland and the northern region of France, allowing ITV to fulfil licensing agreements with content producers. However, many people report successful reception of these signals from across Europe by using larger dishes.

Sky HD is offered by Sky in both the United Kingdom and Ireland as an add-on to their existing Sky subscription service. The BBC is broadcasting BBC HD as a free-to-air channel from the Astra 2D satellite, and the channel can be viewed for free with suitable satellite reception equipment. There are additional equipment and subscription charges for HD from Sky TV but they are broadcasting an increasing number of channels in the HD format. Sky also offers a free-to-air version of its regular Sky service known as Freesat from Sky. Freesat from Sky provides a non-subscription card for public service broadcast channels Channel 4 and Channel 5, however Channel 4 London, Film4, Film4+1 are free-to-air.

In September 2005, the BBC and ITV announced a free-to-air satellite service as a competitor to Freesat from Sky, to be called Freesat. Launched in May 2008, Freesat offers all BBC and ITV digital TV channels, plus other channels, interactive services, and radio channels, all using existing broadcasts from Astra 28.2°E. It is being touted as the satellite equivalent to Freeview, especially for areas unable to receive the Freeview DTT service.

== High-definition ==
The UK now has 3 main ways of accessing high definition television channels.

=== Free-to-air ===
The BBC has launched its own high-definition service called BBC HD which is currently available via Digital Satellite. Rather than simulcasting one of the corporation's existing channels, the channel broadcasts for several hours per day and broadcasts a selection of its high-definition programming.

BBC HD is also available on Virgin Media and Freeview.

BBC One HD was launched on 3 November 2010 on Sky, Virgin, Freesat and Freeview.

During 2006, ITV trialled its high-definition service ITV HD. This trial was a Digital Terrestrial trial which broadcast only from the Crystal Palace transmitting station in London. The channel was transitioned as a full service initially only on Freesat in Spring 2008.

=== Free-to-view ===
Channel 4 launched a high-definition simulcast, Channel 4 HD of its main channel on digital satellite on 10 December 2007. It also took part in the terrestrial trial mentioned above and launched on Freeview on 31 March 2010.

ITV HD, which first aired on 7 June 2008, operated as an occasional service as part of the Freesat network, available on the "red button" with Freesat receivers only. It then relaunched as ITV1 HD on 2 April 2010 as a full service across all platforms.

=== Subscription ===
Sky offers HD sports channels, along with a HD sports news channel, HD movie channels, and several other subscription HD channels, such as Discovery HD.

Public consultation on the Trust's provisional conclusions on the proposed BBC HD service ended on 23 October 2007.

== See also ==
- Digital terrestrial television in the United Kingdom
- Digital television transition
- Digital TV Group
- HDTV
- Astra 28.2°E
