= Celebrity Big Brother (British TV series) series 21 =

Celebrity Big Brother
- Series 21
- Series twenty-one logo
- Presented by: Emma Willis
- No. of days: 32
- No. of housemates: 16
- Winner: Courtney Act
- Runner-up: Ann Widdecombe
- Companion shows: Big Brother's Bit on the Side
- No. of episodes: 37

Release
- Original network: Channel 5
- Original release: 2 January – 2 February 2018

Series chronology
- ← Previous; Series 20 Next → Series 22

Celebrity Big Brother 21, also known as Celebrity Big Brother: Year of the Woman, is the twenty-first series of the British reality television series Celebrity Big Brother. It launched on 2 January 2018 on Channel 5, and concluded on 2 February 2018 after 32 days, making it the joint longest series to date. It is the fourteenth celebrity series and the twenty-first series of Big Brother overall to air on Channel 5. Emma Willis returned to host the series, while Rylan Clark-Neal continued to present Celebrity Big Brother's Bit on the Side.

On 2 February 2018, Courtney Act was announced as the winner of the series having received 49.43% of the final vote, with Ann Widdecombe as the runner-up after receiving 39.50%.

== Format ==
Celebrity Big Brother is a game show in which a group of celebrity contestants, referred to as housemates, live in isolation from the outside world in a custom built "house", constantly under video surveillance. During their time in the House, the housemates are required to nominate two of their fellow contestants for potential eviction, and the two or more with the most votes would be nominated. This process is mandatory for all housemates, and failure to comply could result in expulsion from the House. The public then vote, with one of those celebrities evicted from the house. When the final week arrives, the viewers vote for which of the remaining celebrities should win the series, and the housemate with the most votes becomes the winner.

During their time in the House, housemates are given weekly tasks to perform. The housemates wager a portion of their weekly shopping budget on the task, and either win double their wagered fund or lose the wagered fund depending on their performance in the task. The housemates are required to work as a group to complete their tasks, with the format of the tasks varying based on the number of remaining housemates. Throughout the series, some housemates have been given secret tasks that must either be completed individually or with a small group; failure to do so can result in the housemate being nominated or punished in the House. Should the housemates run out of the food provided for them, an emergency ration was available to them. The housemates are forbidden from discussing nominations, and doing so could result in punishment. The format of the series is mainly seen as a social experiment, and requires housemates to interact with others who may have differing ideals, beliefs, and prejudices. Housemates are also required to make visits to the Diary Room during their stay in the House, where they are able to share their thoughts and feelings on their fellow housemates and the game.

== Housemates ==
On Day 1, eight female housemates entered the house during the launch. It was also confirmed that a further eight males would be joining them on Day 4 during a live special.

| Celebrity | Age on entry | Notability | Day entered | Day exited | Status |
|---|---|---|---|---|---|
| Courtney Act | 35 | Drag queen & reality TV star | 4 | 32 | Winner |
| Ann Widdecombe | 70 | Politician | 1 | 32 | Runner-up |
| Shane Lynch | 41 | Singer | 4 | 32 | 3rd place |
| Jess Impiazzi | 28 | Reality TV star and model | 1 | 32 | 4th place |
| Wayne Sleep | 69 | Ballet dancer | 4 | 32 | 5th place |
| Amanda Barrie | 82 | Actress | 1 | 29 | Evicted |
| Malika Haqq | 34 | Reality TV star | 1 | 29 | Evicted |
| Ashley James | 30 | Reality TV star and DJ | 1 | 29 | Evicted |
| Daniel O'Reilly | 33 | Comedian | 4 | 25 | Evicted |
| Jonny Mitchell | 26 | Reality TV star | 4 | 25 | Evicted |
| Andrew Brady | 27 | Reality TV star | 4 | 25 | Evicted |
| Ginuwine | 47 | Singer | 4 | 22 | Evicted |
| John Barnes | 54 | Footballer | 4 | 20 | Evicted |
| Maggie Oliver | 62 | Detective constable | 1 | 18 | Evicted |
| Rachel Johnson | 52 | Journalist and presenter | 1 | 18 | Evicted |
| India Willoughby | 52 | Newsreader | 1 | 11 | Evicted |

=== Amanda Barrie ===
Amanda Barrie is an English actress who is best known for playing Alma Halliwell in ITV soap opera Coronation Street. In 1963 and 1964, Barrie starred in two Carry On films, Carry On Cabby and Carry On Cleo. Most recently, she appeared in the TV series The Real Marigold Hotel. She entered the house on Day 1 and was the eleventh housemate to be evicted, on Day 29.

=== Andrew Brady ===
Andrew Brady is a British reality television personality best known for competing on the thirteenth series of The Apprentice in 2017. He entered the house on Day 4 and was the sixth housemate to be evicted, on Day 25.

=== Ann Widdecombe ===
Ann Widdecombe was a British Conservative politician and author. Widdecombe became most known for expressing views opposing abortion, voting for the reinstatement of the death penalty and opposing same-sex marriage. Since retiring, she appeared on the eighth series of Strictly Come Dancing and most recently, starred in pantomime. She entered the house on Day 1 and left the house on Day 32, as the runner-up.

=== Ashley James ===
Ashley James is a British reality television personality known for starring as a cast member on the E4 reality series Made in Chelsea during the fourth and fifth series. Following this, she began concentrating on her music career as a DJ. She entered the house on Day 1, and was the ninth housemate to be evicted, on Day 29.

=== Daniel O'Reilly ===
David Daniel O'Reilly, known better by his stage name Dapper Laughs, is a British stand-up comedian and media personality. In 2014, he hosted his own dating show Dapper Laughs: On the Pull on ITV2, but it was axed after one series following a rape joke controversy. He also reached number 15 in the UK Singles Chart with his debut single "Proper Moist". He entered the house on Day 4 and was the eighth housemate to be evicted, on Day 25.

=== Ginuwine ===
Elgin Baylor Lumpkin, known better by his stage name Ginuwine, is an American singer, songwriter and actor best known for releasing a number of multi-platinum and platinum-selling albums and singles in the 1990s and 2000s, including "Pony" in 1996. As well as singing, he has starred in films such as Juwanna Mann and television series such as Martial Law. He entered the house on Day 4 and was the fifth housemate to be evicted, on Day 22.

=== India Willoughby ===
India Willoughby is an English journalist and newsreader, best known for becoming Britain's first transgender television newsreader. She began her career on ITV in 2000. She entered the house on Day 1 and was the first housemate to be evicted, on Day 11.

=== Jess Impiazzi ===
Jess Impiazzi is a British reality television personality and glamour model, best known as a cast member in the MTV reality series Ex on the Beach during the second series in 2015 before later returning for the fifth "All star" series in 2016. Before this, she appeared on The Only Way Is Essex in 2012 as a "Sugar Hut Honey". She entered the house on Day 1 and left the house on Day 32 in fourth place.

=== John Barnes ===
John Barnes is a Jamaican-born British former footballer, rapper and manager. He is best known for his time at Watford and Liverpool, as well as playing for the England national team in the 1980s and 1990s. In the run-up to England's 1990 FIFA World Cup campaign, he recorded a rap for the official team song, New Order's "World in Motion" which reached number one in the UK Singles Chart. After retiring from football, he became a commentator and pundit for ESPN and SuperSport. He entered the house on Day 4, and was the fourth housemate to be evicted, on Day 20.

=== Jonny Mitchell ===
Jonny Mitchell is a British business director and reality television personality best known for being a cast member in the third series of ITV2 dating reality show Love Island in 2017. He entered the house on Day 4 and was the seventh housemate to be evicted, on Day 25.

=== Maggie Oliver ===
Margaret Oliver is an English former Detective Constable in the Greater Manchester Police, best known for exposing the Rochdale child sex abuse ring. Oliver quit the force after serving 16 years to expose the wrongdoings of senior officers. She entered the house on Day 1 and was the third housemate to be evicted, on Day 18.

=== Malika Haqq ===
Malika Haqq is an American reality television personality and actress, best known for her friendship with Khloe Kardashian as well as appearing in her reality shows such as Keeping Up with the Kardashians and Dash Dolls. In 2017, Haqq took part in dating show Famously Single. As an actress she has appeared in films such as Sky High and ATL. She entered the house on Day 1 and was the tenth housemate to be evicted, on Day 29.

=== Rachel Johnson ===
Rachel Johnson is a British editor, journalist, television presenter, and author. She is also the sister of Boris Johnson. She entered the house on Day 1 and became the second housemate to be evicted, on Day 18.

=== Shane Jenek/Courtney Act ===
Shane Gilberto Jenek, known better by their stage name Courtney Act, is an Australian drag queen and reality television personality best known for being a finalist in the sixth season of RuPaul's Drag Race. As well as this, Jenek has appeared on Australian Idol and most recently MTV's Single AF in 2017. Shane J entered the house on Day 4 as Courtney. On Day 32, it was announced that they had won the series.

=== Shane Lynch ===
Shane Lynch is an Irish singer-songwriter best known as a member of boy band Boyzone. The band had 6 number-one singles in the UK Singles Chart, including "No Matter What". Lynch began an acting career, appearing in Sky One's Dream Team, and has since starred in pantomime. He has also taken part in reality television shows The Games and Love Island. He entered the house on Day 4 and left the house on Day 32 in third place.

=== Wayne Sleep ===
Wayne Sleep is a British dancer, choreographer and actor. He has also taken part in Celebrity MasterChef, the second series of I'm a Celebrity...Get Me Out of Here!, and was a judge on ITV talent show Stepping Out. As an actor, Sleep has had roles in films such as The First Great Train Robbery and Elizabeth. He entered the house on Day 4 and left the house on Day 32 in fifth place.

== Nominations table ==
| | Day 8 | Day 14 | Day 19 | Day 21 | Day 23 | Day 27 | Day 32 Final | | Nominations received |
|---|---|---|---|---|---|---|---|---|---|
| Shane J | Not eligible | Ann, Rachel | No nominations | Jonny, Ginuwine | Not eligible | Amanda, Ann | Winner (Day 32) | | 12 |
| Ann | India, Andrew | Not eligible | No nominations | Daniel, Shane J | Shane J, Andrew | Shane J, Malika | Runner-up (Day 32) | | 13 |
| Shane L | Not eligible | Andrew, Rachel | No nominations | Wayne, Ashley | Not eligible | Shane J, Ashley | Third place (Day 32) | | 2 |
| Jess | India, Ann | Not eligible | No nominations | Jonny, Wayne | Jonny, Andrew | Shane J, Malika | Fourth place (Day 32) | | 0 |
| Wayne | Not eligible | Shane J, Daniel | No nominations | Ann, Daniel | Not eligible | Ann, Shane J | Fifth place (Day 32) | | 3 |
| Amanda | Jonny, India | Not eligible | No nominations | Daniel, Ginuwine | Daniel, Shane J | Shane J, Malika | Evicted (Day 29) | | 4 |
| Malika | Andrew, Ann | Not eligible | No nominations | Jonny, Ann | Jonny, Andrew | Ann, Amanda | Evicted (Day 29) | | 6 |
| Ashley | India, Jonny | Not eligible | No nominations | Jonny, Shane L | Shane J, Andrew | Shane J, Shane L | Evicted (Day 29) | | 2 |
| Daniel | Not eligible | Ann, Andrew | No nominations | Ann, Amanda | Not eligible | Evicted (Day 25) | | | 6 |
| Jonny | Not eligible | John, Malika | No nominations | Amanda, Malika | Not eligible | Evicted (Day 25) | | | 10 |
| Andrew | Not eligible | Ann, Ginuwine | No nominations | Ginuwine, Malika | Not eligible | Evicted (Day 25) | | | 9 |
| Ginuwine | Not eligible | Ann, John | No nominations | Wayne, Shane J | Evicted (Day 22) | | | | 5 |
| John | Not eligible | Andrew; Daniel | No nominations | Evicted (Day 20) | | | | | 2 |
| Maggie | India, Jonny | Not eligible | Evicted (Day 18) | | | | | | 0 |
| Rachel | India, Jonny | Not eligible | Evicted (Day 18) | | | | | | 2 |
| India | Ann, Ginuwine | Evicted (Day 11) | | | | | | | 6 |
| Notes | 1 | 2 | 3 | none | 4 | none | 5 | | |
| Against public vote | India, Jonny | Andrew, Ann, John, Maggie, Rachel | Daniel, John | Ann, Daniel, Ginuwine, Jonny, Wayne | Andrew, Daniel, Jonny, Shane J | Amanda, Ann, Ashley, Malika, Shane J, Shane L | Ann, Jess, Shane J, Shane L, Wayne | | |
| Evicted | India; Fewest votes to save | Rachel; Fewest votes to save | John; Women's choice to evict | Ginuwine; Fewest votes to save | Andrew; Fewest votes to save | Ashley; Fewest votes to save | Wayne; 0.9% (out of 5) | Jess; 2.75% (out of 4) | |
| Evicted | India; Fewest votes to save | Rachel; Fewest votes to save | John; Women's choice to evict | Ginuwine; Fewest votes to save | Jonny; Fewest votes to save | Malika; Fewest votes to save | Shane L 7.42% (out of 3) | Ann; 39.5% (out of 2) | |
| Evicted | India; Fewest votes to save | Maggie; Fewest votes to save | John; Women's choice to evict | Ginuwine; Fewest votes to save | Jonny; Fewest votes to save | Malika; Fewest votes to save | Shane L 7.42% (out of 3) | Ann; 39.5% (out of 2) | |
| Evicted | India; Fewest votes to save | Maggie; Fewest votes to save | John; Women's choice to evict | Ginuwine; Fewest votes to save | Daniel; Fewest votes to save | Amanda; Fewest votes to save | Shane J 49.43% to win | | |

Notes

- ^Note 1: Over the course of the first week, the housemates were given several opportunities to win immunity from the first round of nominations. On launch night, Amanda and Jess won immunity. Later that night, they awarded Maggie immunity. On Day 2, Malika won immunity. After the men entered, they were given the opportunity to win one more immunity pass. On Day 5, Courtney Act won immunity. As a further twist, the nominations were face-to-face, and only the female housemates could nominate.
- ^Note 2: As the men won this week's task, only they were eligible to nominate. Ashley also won immunity during a task, meaning she could not be nominated. After winning the Big Brother's Driving School task, Ann and Daniel were given the opportunity to save a housemate from eviction and replace them with another housemate. They chose to save Daniel, and replaced him with Maggie.
- ^Note 3: The women and men separately were asked to discuss and nominate two housemates of the opposite gender to face eviction. The men nominated Amanda and Ann, while the women nominated Daniel and John. After the women and men competed in a series of tasks, the women were declared the winners and were granted the right to evict one of the two nominated men. They decided to evict John.
- ^Note 4: As the women won this week's task, only they were eligible to nominate in a face-to-face nomination.
- ^Note 5: The public were voting to win rather than to save. The voting percentages reflect the overall final vote and do not take into account the vote freezes between each position. Courtney Act won with 55.58% of the vote over Ann.

== Summary ==
| Day 1 | Entrances | Ann, Malika, Rachel, Ashley, India, Maggie, Jess and Amanda entered the house. |
| Day 1 | Tasks | After entering the house, housemates were split into teams of two, with the team that was the fastest to fix a circuit board allowing power back to the house, would win immunity from the first round of nominations. Amanda and Jess won the task.; Amanda and Jess were told to get to know everyone and then grant immunity to one housemate. They chose Maggie. |
| Day 2 | Tasks | After scoring the most points in an axe throwing competition, Malika won immunity.; Ann & India and Ashley & Rachel paired up to change a tyre in an unknown allotted time. At the end of the task they were told they hadn't completed it in time, therefore all failed to win immunity. |
| Day 4 | Entrances | John, Shane J (as Courtney), Shane L, Jonny, Daniel, Wayne, Andrew and Ginuwine entered the house. |
| Day 5 | Tasks | The men faced a number of challenges to win immunity from the first round of nominations. Shane J was the overall winner. |
| Day 6 | Tasks | Big Brother gave a statement about one of the male housemates. Four men then had to convince the women that the statement is about them. The women then had to guess who they thought the statement was about. |
| Day 7 | Tasks | The men participated in a talent show with the aim to impress the women. At the end of the show, the women then voted for who they thought was most talented. Shane J (as Courtney), received the most votes and was therefore rewarded with a trophy. |
| Day 8 | Tasks | Andrew and Malika were set a number of challenges to see if men or women were better at manipulating. Andrew finished his challenges in the quickest time, and therefore won a luxury hamper for the men. |
| Day 8 | Nominations | Housemates nominated for the first time, but as the women had the power, only they were allowed to cast a vote. Amanda, Jess, Maggie, Malika and Shane J were immune from these nominations having won immunity in earlier tasks. India and Jonny received the most nominations and faced the public vote. |
| Day 9 | Tasks | The men and women secretly competed against each other in a number of factory related challenges. These included decorating cakes and sorting them into boxes, and sorting through recyclable rubbish. They were told that they were playing for control of the house. After two challenges, the teams were scored one each. |
| Day 10 | Tasks | The factory challenges continued, with the men beating the women overall. As a result, the men were given full power in the house and are the only housemates eligible to nominate during the next round of nominations. |
| Day 11 | Tasks | The men and women competed in a communication challenge, where one teammate was blindfolded, another couldn't speak and the last couldn't hear. The teams had to paint three given paintings and they were then judged blindly by the remaining housemates. The women won and received a luxury hamper. |
| Day 11 | Exits | India was evicted from the house, receiving the fewest votes to save. |
| Day 13 | Punishments | As punishment for discussing nominations, Wayne was forced to write on a chalkboard "I must not discuss nominations" until Big Brother told him to stop. |
| Day 14 | Nominations | Housemates nominated for the second time, but as the men had the power, only they were allowed to cast a vote. Ashley was immune from these nominations having won immunity in the earlier task. Ann, Andrew, Daniel, John, and Rachel received the most nominations and faced the public vote. |
| Day 15 | Tasks | The housemates were paired up and competed in "Big Brother's Driving School" in a number of car themed challenges. They were told that the winners of the overall task would receive the power of the house. |
| Day 16 | Tasks | The "Big Brother's Driving School" task continued, with Ann and Daniel winning overall, and winning the power of the house. |
| Day 16 | Nominations | After winning a task, Ann and Daniel were given the power to save a nominated housemate and replace them with somebody else. They chose to save Daniel and replace him with Maggie. |
| Day 18 | Exits | Rachel and Maggie were evicted from the house, receiving the fewest votes to save. |
| Day 19 | Nominations | The housemates were split into men and women, with each group nominating two members of the opposing group to face eviction. The women chose Daniel and John, and the men chose Amanda and Ann. However unbeknown to them, the eviction will later be decided by the winning team after a number of tasks. |
| Day 19 | Tasks | In the first task to save their teammates from eviction, the men and women competed in an endurance task. The women won this, meaning they have an advantage against the men. |
| Day 20 | Tasks | The battle of the sexes task continued with the men and women competing in a number of challenges. With the women the overall winners of the task, they automatically saved Amanda and Ann from eviction. In a twist, the women then had to choose which male nominee to evict - Daniel or John. |
| Day 20 | Exits | John was evicted from the house, after the women chose to evict him. |
| Day 21 | Nominations | All housemates nominated together for the first time. Ann, Daniel, Ginuwine, Jonny and Wayne received the most nominations and faced the public vote. |
| Day 22 | Exits | Ginuwine was evicted from the house, receiving the fewest votes to save. |
| Day 23 | Nominations | As the women won this week's task, they were the only ones eligible to nominate. Andrew, Daniel, Jonny and Shane J received the most nominations and faced the public vote. |
| Day 25 | Exits | Andrew, Jonny and Daniel were evicted from the house, receiving the fewest votes to save. |
| Day 27 | Nominations | All housemates nominated again for the final time. Amanda, Ann, Ashley, Malika, Shane J and Shane L received the most nominations and faced the public vote. |
| Day 29 | Exits | Ashley, Malika and Amanda were evicted from the house, receiving the fewest votes to save. |
| Day 32 | Exits | Wayne left the house in fifth place, Jess left the house in fourth place and Shane L left the house in third place. It was then revealed that Shane J was the winner, leaving Ann as the runner-up. |

== Production ==
It was confirmed on ITV's This Morning that for the first time in Celebrity Big Brother history the launch show would be made up of all females, to mark 100 years of women's suffrage. It was later confirmed that male housemates would enter the house on 5 January.

=== Eye logo ===
The official logo was released on 5 December 2017 and was based on a human eye, the first since Celebrity Big Brother 7 in 2010. Designers also ditched the template used in all previous Channel 5 series.

=== Teasers ===
On 14 December 2017, eight 3-second teasers were released featuring human eyes believed to be the eyes of the new housemates. The official trailer was released on 25 December 2017, the trailer featured eyes believed to be of the celebrity housemates, with Emma Willis featured at the end.

=== House ===
The official house pictures were released on 18 December 2017. The house has a contemporary look with a copper and bronze finishes. A new feature for the series includes a sauna added to a new room in the garden. The two bedrooms were kept, each being named after famous women suffrage campaigners. They were called the 'Davison Bedroom', after Emily Davison, and the 'Pankhurst Bedroom', after Emmeline, Sylvia and Christabel.

== Ratings ==
Official ratings are taken from BARB. Ratings for the episodes on 13 and 20 January (Saturday on Week 3 and 4) include the first-look episode, which aired earlier in the evening on 5Star.

| | Official viewers (millions) | | | | |
| | Week 1 | Week 2 | Week 3 | Week 4 | Week 5 |
|---|---|---|---|---|---|
| Saturday | | 2.00 | 1.71 | 1.66 | 1.63 |
| Sunday | | 2.04 | 1.96 | 2.01 | 1.88 |
| Monday | | 2.13 | 1.96 | 1.92 | 1.87 |
| Tuesday | 2.40 | 2.15 | 2.17 | 1.62 | 1.69 |
| Wednesday | 1.87 | 2.05 | 1.92 | 1.97 | 1.88 |
| Thursday | 2.04 | 2.29 | 2.02 | 1.93 | 1.81 |
| Friday | 2.07 | 2.15 | 1.98 | 1.83 | 1.77 |
| Friday | 1.74 | 1.51 | 1.44 | 1.37 | 1.73 |
| Weekly average | 2.02 | 2.04 | 1.90 | 1.79 | 1.78 |
| Running average | 2.02 | 2.03 | 1.99 | 1.94 | 1.91 |
| Series average | 1.9 | | | | |
Blue-coloured boxes denote live shows.
