= Fashion show (disambiguation) =

A fashion show is an event put on by a fashion designer to showcase his or her upcoming line of clothing.

Fashion Show may also refer to:

- The Fashion Show (UK TV series), a 2008 British television show
- The Fashion Show (U.S. TV series), a 2009 American television show on Bravo
- "The Fashion Show" (The Inbetweeners), the series 3 premiere episode of The Inbetweeners
- Fashion Show Mall
