= Film4oD =

UK based video on demand service for Film4

- Original author(s): Channel Four Television Corporation
- Developer(s): FilmFlex
- Initial release: 1 November 2010
- Platform: Windows (XP and later); Mac OS X (10.4.8 and later)
- Available in: English
- Type: Video on demand
- Website: http://www.film4.com/

Film4oD was a UK based video on demand service for Film4, from Channel Four Television Corporation and FilmFlex. Film4oD officially launched on 1 November 2010, following two years of development by FilmFlex, with more than 500 films available at launch. Film4oD has more new releases available to rent than iTunes, LoveFilm or Blinkbox, with many films available on the same day as DVD release and some on the same day as cinema release.

Films are available for 48-hour rental and are streamed online using Microsoft Silverlight requiring a minimum broadband speed of 2 Mbit/s. A download-to-rent option was added on 26 September 2011, allowing films to be watched while offline.

== Closure ==
The closure of the service was announced in early 2015 and it ceased business in July of that year.

== Television platforms ==
=== TalkTalk TV ===
A separate Film 4 on Demand service is available on TalkTalk TV, this service is separate from the web base service and offers films for free to TalkTalk TV customers on channel 183. Film 4 on Demand shows a wide range of films that include British film, US independent films, Hollywood blockbusters, drama and comedy, guilty pleasures, foreign and cult cinema.

=== YouView ===
Film4oD was among the prospective content partners for YouView, however Film4oD was not available on the service at its launch in July 2012.

== See also ==
- Channel 4
- Film4
