= Margaret Oliver =

English detective constable and whistleblower

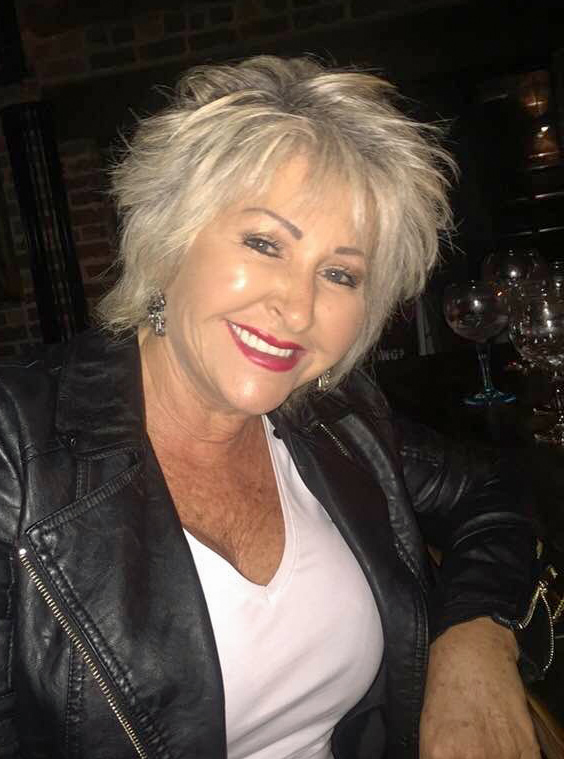
- Oliver in 2018
- Born: 23 October 1955 (age 71)
- Occupations: social activist, former police officer
- Known for: investigating the Rochdale child sex abuse ring
- Website: http://maggieoliver.co.uk

Margaret Oliver (born 23 October 1955) is an English former Detective Constable with the Greater Manchester Police. She is known as a whistleblower for exposing the cover up of the Rochdale child sex abuse ring case by her own force.

== Law enforcement career ==
Oliver joined the Greater Manchester Police in 1997 as a police constable. She remained with the force until her resignation in March 2013 in response to the handling of the Rochdale child sex abuse ring.

=== Exposing Rochdale child sex abuse ring ===
==== Operation Augusta in Hulme and Rusholme ====
As a detective constable, Oliver worked on the Rochdale child sex abuse ring case for the Greater Manchester Police. She claims that the convictions that were made in the Rochdale child sex abuse ring of 9 men in early 2012 barely scratched the surface of what she describes as a highly-organised crime group of hundreds of perpetrators against countless young victims. When Oliver started investigating the sex abuse ring, she had worked for the police force since 1997. She had been part of The Serious Crime Division of the GMP and investigated countless gangland murders, shootings, kidnappings, rapes and witness protection cases. The first contact with the scandal was her investigation into multiple severe sexual assaults perpetrated mainly by Pakistani men.

During her work in Operation Augusta, Oliver interviewed many victims, some as young as 11. She was again shocked by the lack of response of the police force and the lack of efforts in trying to protect the victims. She claims that it seemed as if the authorities had known about the crimes for ten years when she started working on Operation Augusta. An almost-identical pattern could be observed to what was happening in Rochdale. In the operation, 26 teenage girls had been identified to have been trafficked to about 206 suspects in Hulme and Rusholme and were abused by men mainly of Pakistani background. One of the girls that was abused by suspects in Operation Augusta died in Rochdale.

In Operation Augusta, 16 child victims and 97 perpetrators were identified—of which 3 were taken to court.

The television programme Dispatches filmed the documentary Edge of the City. During its filming, the crew found out that girls in Yorkshire were being groomed and abused by a network of men. The girl who had died in Rochdale was one of the group of girls being filmed by the team. The Greater Manchester Police had the broadcast of the documentary delayed for fear that it would make public its failure to protect the girls. After the broadcast, a small group of detectives was formed to deal with the problem of the grooming gangs. In 2005, Oliver left the force, as her husband, Norman, was dying of terminal cancer. When she returned, she claims that the investigations had been closed. None of the perpetrators had been prosecuted, and the victims were still being abused. She was told that the victims "were prostitutes making a life style choice" and that they were "bad kids" and not credible witnesses. Oliver was disgusted by that and said that the victims were among the most vulnerable children in British society.

==== Mayor of Manchester's re-evaluation ====
The Mayor of Manchester, Andy Burnham, ordered an independent report on Operation Augusta, which was published on 14 January 2020. It found failings by the police and by children's services. Greater Manchester Police accepted the report and apologised to the victims "who have been denied justice" and stated that it had established a major investigation team to look again at the abuse of Victoria and the other girls in 2004. The chief constable asked for all lines of enquiry from 2004 to be pursued, and further information has emerged in 38 of the 52 cases with new victims and new alleged attackers.

==== Operation Span in Rochdale ====
In 2010, Oliver received a phone call about a case breaking in Rochdale. The phone call was an invitation to join Operation Span, which was the investigation of child grooming in Rochdale. The original investigation in 2008 and 2009 had been chaotic. The girls had been labelled unreliable witnesses, and the CPS had decided not to prosecute. Oliver was asked to try to regain the trust of the girls. She agreed to take on the case only because the department assured her that what happened in Operation Augusta would not happen again in Operation Span. There had been an exhibit, which was kept as evidence within the department, of a fetus that had been ceased within a termination of a pregnancy of a 13-year-old child, nicknamed Ruby. The exhibit had been found in a routine property review. The family had never given consent for the fetus to be kept as an exhibit. Her sister, who was 15 years old, was suspected to have been a madam, a procurer of prostitutes for pimps, for a group of Pakistani men and so had been arrested. As the patterns in Rochdale were identical to what had happened in Operation Augusta, Oliver was asked to join the investigation around the exhibit and the sisters.

Oliver started her investigation by trying to gain the trust of the family of the two sisters. From the testimonies of the girls and their mother, Oliver's team found locations in which the abuse had happened and vehicles that were used to transport the victims, and it identified many serial sex offenders. The family also performed ID parades and helped police identify locations, times, phone numbers and names of the abusers.

==== Intimidation of victim nicknamed Amber by authorities and subsequent resignation ====
Oliver claims that she was told by colleagues that they planned on never using the testimonies of the family of the sisters and her mother, nicknamed Amber. She claims that they were trying to alienate the mother and to make her go away and stop co-operating with the police so that there would be no evidence of the crimes. Oliver also claims that they did not record the crimes that the family alleged in their testimonies but instead just buried all of the reports. When Oliver got upset about the handling of the case, she claims one of her seniors told her, "Maggie, calm down. Listen: What would these kids ever contribute to society? They should have just been drowned at birth". Then, Oliver stormed off the job. Her colleagues did not tell the family that they were not using their testimonies to prosecute the perpetrators. When they had to put up a trial because of public outrage, they realised that they need the testimony of one of the girls for it. To force her to testify, they turned her from a victim to an offender for the crimes. They used the videotapes of the interviews that Oliver had conducted with her to prosecute her. Although the girl was never told of her charges, a breach of judicial procedures, she was portrayed as a madam who had procured other girls for the pedophile sex ring although she had been only 15 at that time. That would have never stood in court, as the CPS had already identified her as a victim. However, the girl was so scared of the charges that she complied and testified again during the trial. Oliver was forbidden from talking to the family.

After the trial had finished, Oliver talked to the family again. She asked whether it was aware that the daughter had been put on the indictment as one of the perpetrators of the pedophile network. The family had not been aware of that at all. However, she had had another baby, who was taken away from her by social services after birth. The family now knew that the reason had been that she had been named as one of the perpetrators of the pedophile ring. Oliver suspects that social services did so to intimidate her and cover their wrongdoings during the whole ordeal. The baby was taken unlawfully, as no court order by a judge had been obtained. One year after the child had been taken away, a judge ruled that the baby was to be returned to the family. It also came out later that member of social services had interviewed acquaintances of Amber to testify that she was a bad mother so that they could take her children from her.

During the investigation, social workers told her that they had been trying for years to get the police to take the problem seriously.

Oliver said that Child Protection Services were equipped to deal only with sexual abuse of children perpetrated by assailants known by the victim (family members, teachers etc.) and so the type of assault taking place in grooming (by strangers) was not something that they were equipped to handle. Neither CPS nor the police had really felt responsible or had been equipped to deal with the new grooming phenomenon. Oliver claims that for 18 months, she tried to be heard by different parts of the justice system, including the Head of Serious Crime, the Chief Constable, the IPCC and the Home Office. She left the force in 2012 in disgust of the handling of the case by Greater Manchester Police and the Crown Prosecution Service. Oliver did so with the intention of speaking out about the mishandling of the cases and of informing the public.

==== Allegations of ongoing coverup ====
Oliver claims that many of the men who were involved in the abuse of the girls have still not been charged, arrested or imprisoned. One example was a suspect who impregnated a 13-year-old, as was proven by DNA evidence from the fetus of the forced abortion, that was released after two years. Countless others were not charged at all or have already been freed. She also claims that several men were fighting extradition and were receiving legal aid from the government that amounts to millions of pounds to do so.

==== Criticism of charges brought forward ====
Oliver said that the men could have been charged with crimes, which would have carried higher sentences in the trial. Even though all of them had been perpetrators of rapes of dozens of underage girls, many of them were never charged with rape. Not even the man who raped Ruby, a case in which a fetus and DNA evidence proved that he was guilty, was eventually charged with rape. Instead, many of the suspects were charged only with conspiracy to rape or human trafficking, charges that were easier to prove.

==== Criticism of treatment of victims ====
Oliver criticises the treatment of the victims by the authorities during the investigation, during the trial and after the trials. She also states that as there are usually several perpetrators in grooming trials when victims testify in court, they are questioned repeatedly by every lawyer of every suspected perpetrator, which puts the victims under extreme stress and causes an immense re-victimisation. Oliver believes that there should be a system in place to refer victims to support networks that include long-term psychological counselling and other services.

== Media portrayals and appearances ==
Oliver was portrayed by Lesley Sharp in Three Girls, a BBC drama about the Rochdale child sex abuse ring. She also acted as a consultant for the series.

Oliver appeared in Celebrity Big Brother 21, entered on day 1 and was evicted on day 18.

== Activism ==
Oliver founded the Maggie Oliver Foundation for the survivors of the Rochdale abuse scandal. The mission of the foundation is to "transform pain into power." The foundation is planning on opening a network of "Maggie Oliver Centres" for women. It is intended to be run by volunteers and survivors of the scandal. In the house support will be given to those who have been affected by sexual abuse. They will receive help to access support, legal advice, therapy, training and education. Oliver is also a public speaker raising awareness on sexual abuse perpetrated by organised grooming gangs. Oliver regularly appears on the ITV programme Loose Women. There she started the Never Too Late To Tell campaign in December 2016, which encourages all survivors of sexual assault to speak out about what happened to them. On the programme she gave further advice on recording evidence, having an open dialogue with children, monitoring technology, enlisting help and looking for changes in children's behaviour as signs of abuse.

== Works ==
Oliver, Margaret (2019). Survivors: One Brave Detective's Battle to Expose the Rochdale Child Abuse Scandal. [John Blake]; ISBN 1789460859 (London, UK)
