= ITV1 HD =

- Logo used since 2022
- Country: United Kingdom
- Broadcast area: ITV plc owned regions

Programming
- Picture format: 1080i/1080p HDTV

Ownership
- Owner: ITV Digital Channels (ITV plc)
- Sister channels: ITV1; ITV2 HD; ITV3 HD; ITV4 HD; ITV Quiz HD

History
- Launched: 9 June 2006; 20 years ago (as trial); 7 June 2008; 18 years ago (as red button service, exclusive to Freesat); 2 December 2009; 16 years ago (as channel, exclusive to Freeview HD); 2 April 2010; 16 years ago (as standard channel on ITV)
- Replaced: Men & Motors (on Freesat and Sky)
- Closed: 30 November 2006; 19 years ago (as trial); 1 April 2010; 16 years ago (as red button service switching to a full-time channel on Freeview, with the closure of Men & Motors)
- Former names: ITV HD (2006–2009; 2013–2022)

Links
- Website: itv.com

Availability

Terrestrial
- Freeview: Channel 103

ITV1 HD is a British free-to-air high-definition public broadcast television network operated by ITV plc, the company which is contracted to provide 13 ITV1 services across the UK. ITV1 HD simulcasts them in high-definition. ITV1 HD is available to view in England, Wales, Scottish Borders and the Channel Islands on Freesat via channel 103, Freeview channel 103, Sky channel 103, Virgin Media channel 103 and in Switzerland on SwisscomTV.

From 2 April 2010, ITV1 HD relaunched as a standard channel available on all digital platforms. It now identifies on-air simply as ITV1, without "HD" in a logo.

== History ==
=== 2006 trial ===
The original logo of ITV HD

The channel originally existed on a trial basis from June until November 2006, primarily to show the World Cup games to which ITV had the rights.

The channel was available to subscribers of the Telewest TV Drive cable service and was also broadcast as a low-power digital terrestrial (DVB-T) channel from London's Crystal Palace Transmitter as part of a terrestrial HDTV trial involving 450 homes. ITV HD did not broadcast on satellite television, unlike BBC HD. It was available on Telewest channel 118 and Freeview channel 503 in homes which were involved in the HD trial.

In addition to the World Cup games, ITV HD showed classic films remastered in HD (such as All Quiet on the Western Front and The Big Sleep), documentaries (such as Jean-Michel Cousteau’s Ocean Adventures) and dramas such as Poirot.

The original ITV HD stopped broadcasting on 30 November 2006.

=== 2008 launch ===
The ITV HD logo (2008–2010)

High definition broadcasts from ITV plc launched exclusively on Freesat, the new digital satellite service from the BBC and ITV on 7 June 2008, just in time for the start of UEFA Euro 2008. ITV plc planned to spend £10m during 2008 on the launch of ITV HD.

=== Freeview and 2009 rebrand ===
ITV HD became ITV1 HD when it relaunched for Freeview HD on 2 December 2009. It continued to operate on Freesat as a red button service on select programming.

ITV1 HD aimed to include 35% 'native HD' content at the start of 2010, rising to at least 60% at the start of 2012 and at least 70% at the start of 2014. In the early years, the service will focus on sport and drama content, over time it is expected that the majority of other genres to convert to native HD.

ITV1 HD operated from 18:00 to 23:00 seven days a week. From August 2009, ITV began testing a HD simulcast of ITV Granada on satellite, before later switching to ITV London. On 26 November 2009, the ITV1 HD logo appeared as a digital on-screen graphic during programming and the off air station identification.

=== 2010 launch as a standard channel ===
ITV1 HD logo from 9 April 2010 – 13 January 2013

On 12 March 2010, it was announced that ITV1 HD would become a standard channel on 2 April 2010, simulcasting the main ITV1 channel, and launching on Sky and Virgin Media, as well as switching from a red button interactive service to a full-time channel on Freesat. It continues to only be available in ITV plc owned ITV franchise areas, covering England, Wales and the Scottish Borders area, though red button access on ITV1 London (Freesat channel 977) remains in place. The launch coincided with the closure of Men & Motors.

During March 2010, Ofcom issued broadcast licences for six regional variations of ITV1 HD, with Central, Granada/Border and Meridian/Anglia regions joining London/LWT on air in June 2010. Two of these variations were initially only available on a free-to-view basis on satellite, requiring a Sky viewing card to access; Freesat viewers in those regions were instead given either the Granada/Border or London variation. However, Meridian became free-to-air in September 2012 with Central following in October 2012.

ITV HD logo from 14 January 2013 – 31 December 2018

On 14 January 2013, ITV1 HD received a new logo and went back to its former name, "ITV HD", as part of a rebranding of ITV's television channels and online services.

On 25 August 2015, ITV Cymru Wales became available on HD on all platforms, viewers in Wales having previously received either the London or Central variant (depending on their TV provider).

=== More regions go HD on satellite, 2016–2020 ===
On 31 March 2016, a further three ITV regions were made available in HD via satellite, ITV Anglia (east), ITV Tyne Tees, and ITV Yorkshire (west), followed by the Border England, West Country (West and South West) regions in November of same the year.

From 20 October 2020, further ITV subregions began broadcasting in the clear on satellite – these being Central (East), Anglia (West), Yorkshire (East) and the South and Thames Valley feeds of Meridian. Once formally added to Sky and Freesat, all ITV regions in England and Wales will have their correct variant of ITV available in HD (channel 103 on Freesat and channel 103 on Sky with the HD swap enabled.) Of the ITV plc-owned regions on the GB mainland, only Border Scotland is not available in HD until 12 December 2023.

These additional subregions launched since 2016 are broadcast solely on the Sky and Freesat platforms, with Freeview users continuing to receive the same regional variants as in place since Wales' split in 2015 – so, for instance, viewers in the Border region see Granada in HD. This is due to the limited regionalisation of the Freeview multiplex which carries the main HD channels (with BBC One HD currently broadcasting a single all-England service with no regional splits).

Until 2023, the ITV HD service was not available in the Channel Islands. This was a legacy of the ITV Channel Television service having been independent of ITV plc prior to 2010, a status which also meant ITV2 and other ITV plc digital services were unavailable over Freeview on the islands until 2012. ITV1 HD became available in the Channel Islands on 12 December 2023.

== Technical problems ==
=== Harley Street ===
ITV HD's first HD drama broadcast of Harley Street reportedly suffered technical problems including picture and sound quality and failing to revert to the normal ITV broadcast after the programme had finished. Also, several Digital Spy forum members reported that they could not access HD content via the red button due to the ITV HD service "only being available through the London region".

=== 2010 World Cup ===
On 12 June 2010, ITV HD cut off England's first 2010 FIFA World Cup game inadvertently into an advert break for 25 seconds, as a result, missing their first World Cup 2010 goal. This interruption also caused the remaining transmission to be in standard-definition. The standard definition ITV broadcasts did not miss the goal, scored by Steven Gerrard. ITV blamed the incident on human error at Technicolor, the firm that provided transmission. On 23 August 2010, Ofcom cleared ITV over the "unfortunate error", despite receiving 823 complaints. After reviewing the situation, Ofcom acknowledged the frustration of ITV HD viewers at the transmission break, but decided that ITV's actions to resolve the situation had been sufficient.

=== The X Factor ===
On 12 November 2011, a power failure at the BT Tower resulted in the loss of ITV HD, the channel froze during Harry Hill's TV Burp and continued throughout The X Factor live show. ITV in standard definition was unable to show live footage and instead aired re-runs of participants' auditions until the problem was fixed 15 minutes later. Although the standard definition channel began to work after 15 minutes, ITV HD Granada was still frozen although ITV HD London seemed to work.

=== Champions League ===
On 25 April 2012, a technical fault during extra-time in the 2011-12 UEFA Champions League semi-final between Real Madrid and Bayern Munich resulted in the Meridian and London versions of the channel cutting to Mark Austin preparing to read the 10 pm news bulletin.
