= Shola Mos-Shogbamimu =

British-Nigerian lawyer, activist, commentator and author

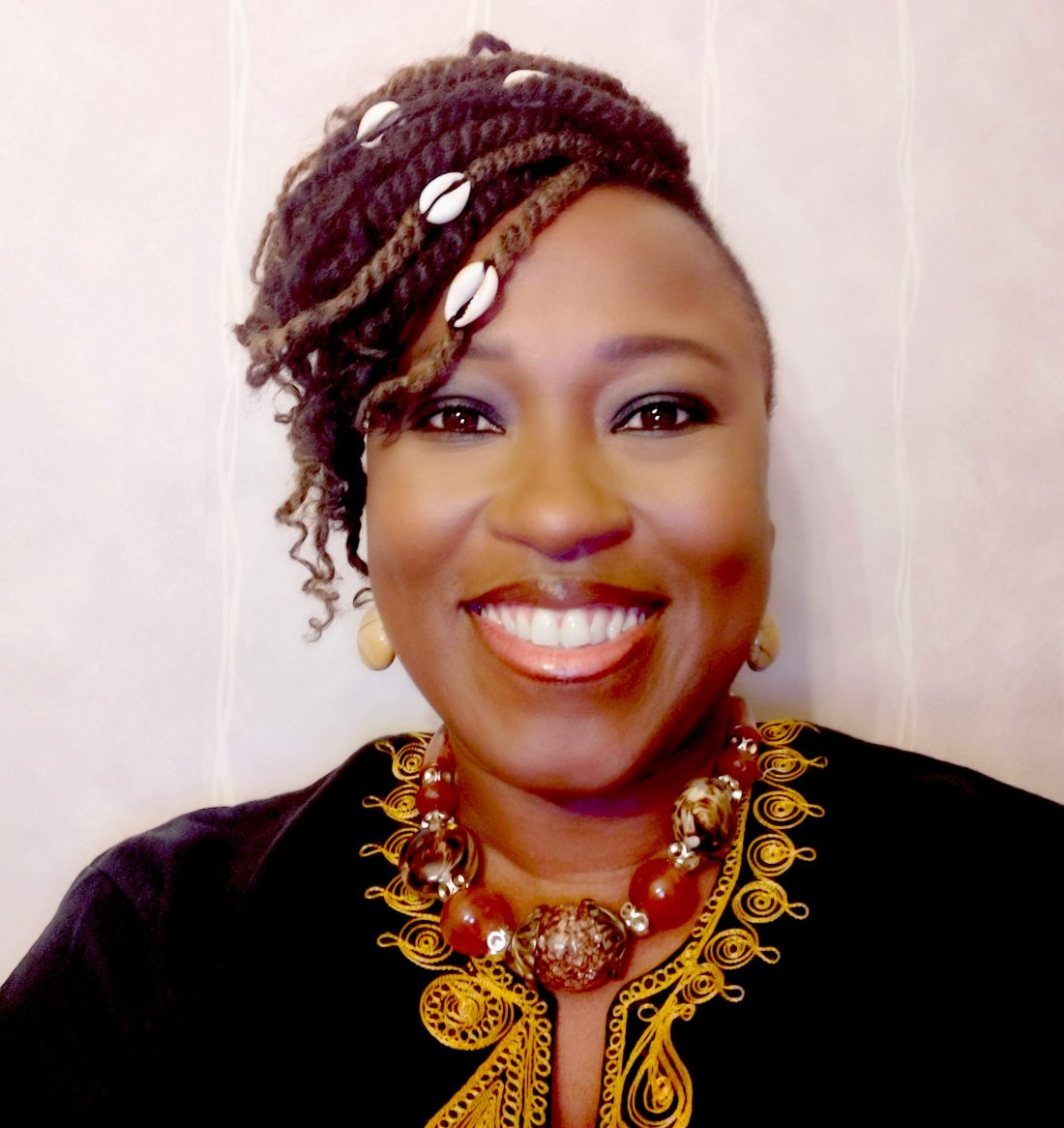
- Born: Adeshola Babington-Ashaye; Hackney, London
- Education: University of Buckingham (LLB); University of Westminster (MA); London School of Economics (LLM); Birkbeck, University of London (PhD); University of Cambridge (Executive MBA)
- Occupation: Political commentator
- Notable work: This Is Why I Resist (2021)
- Children: 3
- Website: drshola.com

Adeshola Mos-Shogbamimu OBE (née Babington-Ashaye) is a British lawyer and academic, notable as an activist and political commentator. She frequently comments on women's rights, law, politics, diversity, inequality and exclusion. Her debut book, This is Why I Resist, was described in The Telegraph as "an unapologetic declaration that black identity will no longer be defined by white supremacy, and an unfettered call to action to revolutionise the narrative around the black experience in our day-to-day lives."

== Early life and education ==
Adeshola Babington-Ashaye was born in Hackney, London to Yoruba Nigerian parents. She was raised in London, Nigeria, and the United States, and lived in East Africa when her mother was working for the Commonwealth of Nations. Speaking of how she has been influenced by her Nigerian heritage, she has said: "My parents brought me up with a really strong identity of who I am and so I have never felt inferior due to the colour of my skin, being a woman or gender. I would use the word feminist to describe my father. He was the first male feminist I knew."

At the age of 19 she obtained her first degree, an honours LLB, from the University of Buckingham, and went on to earn an MA degree in diplomatic studies from the University of Westminster, an LLM degree in Commercial & Corporate Law from the London School of Economics, a PhD in law from Birkbeck, University of London, and an Executive MBA from the University of Cambridge.

== Career ==
Mos-Shogbamimu is an attorney in New York, and a solicitor in England and Wales. She has worked in international finance.

=== Role as commentator and impact ===
In June 2020, Vogue magazine named Mos-Shogbamimu among "8 Educational Black Voices To Listen And Learn From Now". She is the founder of the magazine Women in Leadership. Mos-Shogbamimu appears on television as a commentator on issues related to politics, current affairs, race and diversity. She has been particularly outspoken about what she perceives to be the negative media treatment of "women of colour" who are in the public eye, such as Serena Williams and Meghan Markle. In 2019, Mos-Shogbamimu delivered a TEDx Talk entitled "This is why I resist", in which she explained why she refuses to be defined by the colour of her skin, her gender or religion, engaging her audience with her views on feminism and politics, and encouragement to join her "conscious revolution". In March 2021, she engaged with Piers Morgan in a debate as a guest on Good Morning Britain, discussing the Oprah with Meghan and Harry interview.

Mos-Shogbamimu has drawn criticism for her remarks about Israel during the country's Gaza war. In February 2024, the family of the Sage co-founder David Goldman withdrew their support from Newcastle University, following tweets by Mos-Shogbamimu the day before the university awarded her an honorary doctorate for her contributions to race equality and combatting discrimination. Mos-Shogbamimu had written on X: "I condemn the State of Israel with every fibre of my being, What is coming out of Gaza is incomprehensible. Scale of evil Israel is perpetrating against Palestinians is staggering. We must never forgive Israel for this. Just like Nazi Germany, one day justice will be served on it."

== Publication ==
Her first book, This Is Why I Resist: Don't Define My Black Identity, was published in January 2021. It aimed to address the nuances and intricacies of "race, racism and race inclusion" terminology.

== Death threats ==
On 20 February 2023, Mos-Shogbamimu reported that she had received a "chilling" letter, ostensibly from the proscribed neo-Nazi terrorist group National Action, that contained death threats directed at her and her family, the same day that transgender television personality India Willoughby reported receiving a similarly threatening letter from the same group. The following day, it was announced that the Metropolitan Police's counter-terrorism command had launched an investigation into the threats.

== Personal life ==
Shola Mos-Shogbamimu is married and has three daughters. She is a Christian.

== Bibliography ==
- This Is Why I Resist: Don't Define My Black Identity, London: Headline, 2021, ISBN 978-1472280763.
