= Daniel O'Reilly (comedian) =

British comedian and Internet celebrity

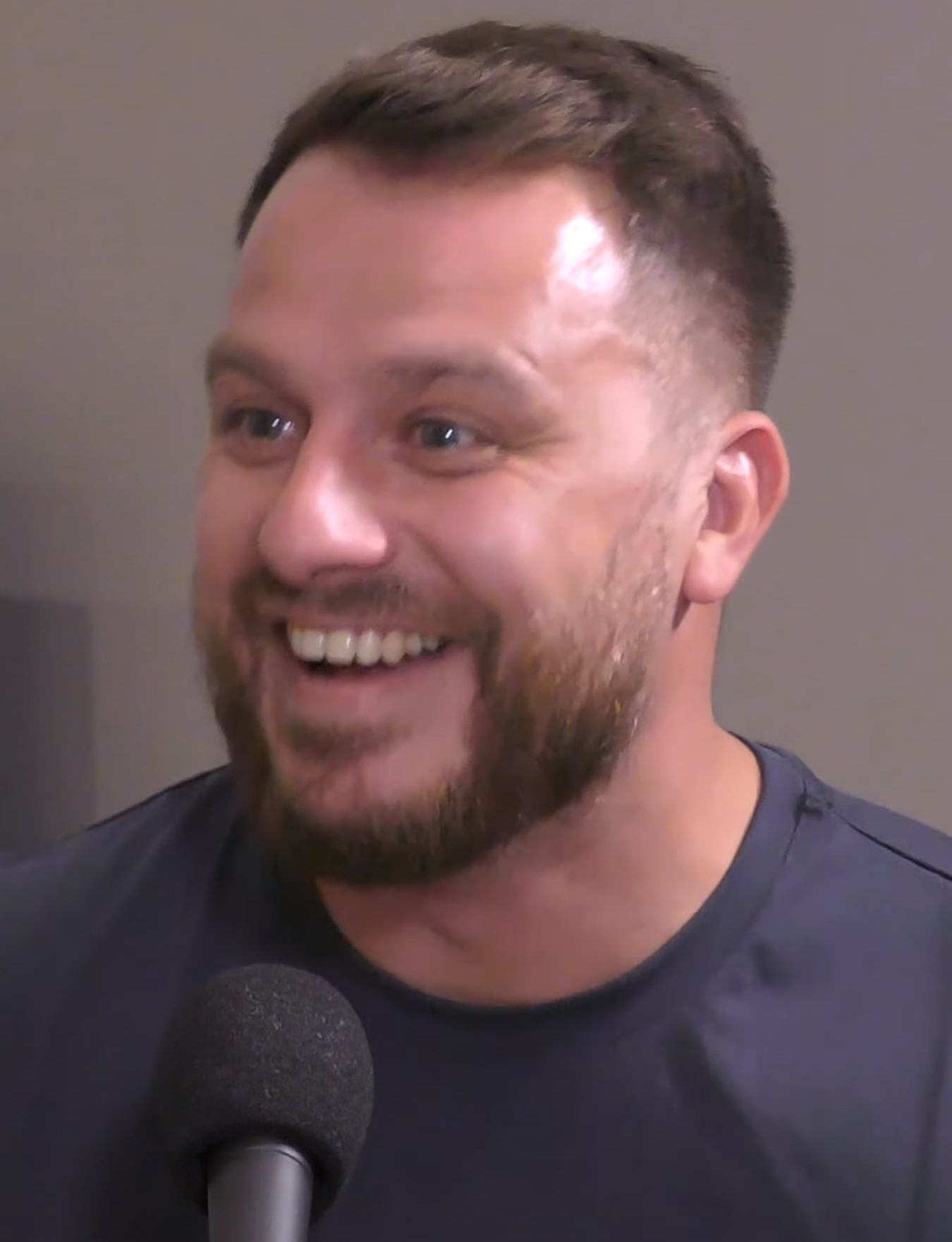
- Daniel O'Reilly in 2020
- Born: Daniel O'Reilly; 17 June 1984 (age 42); Kingston Upon Thames, Surrey, England
- Other name: Dapper Laughs
- Spouse: Shelley Rae (m. 2022)
- Children: 4

Comedy career
- Years active: 2010 - Present
- Medium: Stand-up, Social Media, Television
- Genre: Observational comedy
- Subjects: Relationships, Current Affairs, Politics, Pop Culture
- Website: www.seedanlive.com/

Daniel O'Reilly (born 17 June 1984), also known as Dapper Laughs, is an English comedian, actor, film maker, social media content creator and men's mental health advocate from Addlestone, Surrey.

== Career ==
Daniel O'Reilly became Britain's first major Vine star, posting as Dapper Laughs he amassed over 600,000 followers with short clips focused on "lad culture", pick-up lines, and "banter". His first Vine was posted in July 2013.

In 2014, he hosted the ITV2 dating show On the Pull. The show was cancelled after one series following intense public backlash and a petition with 60,000 signatures after footage emerged of him making a joke about rape during a live show.

In 2014, prior to the show being cancelled O'Reilly released the single "Proper Moist" as Dapper Laughs. The song entered the UK Singles Chart at number 15. Starting in 2014, Laughs began his Moist Tour of the UK. In July, he released "Take It to the Base".

Following a 2014 interview on Newsnight where he claimed to be "killing off" the Dapper Laughs persona, he briefly retreated from the spotlight before returning to social media and stand-up comedy.

In 2018, he appeared on Celebrity Big Brother, using the platform to apologise for past mistakes and show a more personal side, proposing to his girlfriend during the show.

From 2022, O'Reilly began a transition from social media and reality television into independent British cinema. His work primarily focuses on the British "geezer" crime-comedy subgenre. During this period, appearing in films like The Last Heist (2022), Bermondsey Tales: Fall of the Roman Empire (2024) and A Gangster's Kiss (2024). O'Reilly also expanded into film production, with Hyprr Films with two films Kindling (2023) and No Way Up (2024).

In August 2023 he launched Menace to Sobriety podcast as a direct response to his personal struggles with substance abuse, mental health, and his ADHD diagnosis.

O'Reilly has candidly stated that he "needed the podcast" for his own well-being, stating that the show functions as a tool for his own continued sobriety and mental health maintenance alongside his audience.

In 2023 O'Reilly started the Men And Their Emotions (M.A.T.E.) Facebook Group page. The community experienced rapid growth and currently has over 45,000 members. The group was formally registered as a Charitable Incorporated Organisation (CIO) on 19 March 2024.

Starting in 2023, Daniel O'Reilly's return to stand-up comedy was marked by a transition away from his previous "Dapper Laughs" persona toward a more autobiographical and vulnerable performance style under his legal name. In April 2023, he announced the "Out of Character" tour, which represented his first significant return to the stage in nearly a decade. The production focused on themes including his public "cancellation," his personal experiences with sobriety and addiction, his ADHD diagnosis, and his life as a father. The tour commenced in January 2024 and consisted of 60 dates throughout the United Kingdom all of which sold out.

Following the commercial reception of his 2024 return, O'Reilly announced a second, more extensive follow-up tour titled "Let's Have It". Initially scheduled for 2025, the tour was expanded into 2026 due to high ticket demand, encompassing 70 dates.

== Personal life ==
O'Reilly and his wife, former model Shelley Rae, have four children: three daughters and a son born in September 2025.

In January 2018, O'Reilly proposed to Shelley live on television during his eviction interview from the twenty-first series of Celebrity Big Brother. After several delays caused by the COVID-19 pandemic, the couple married in July 2022.

== Sobriety and advocacy ==
Following a period of addiction to alcohol and cocaine, O'Reilly has become a prominent advocate for recovery and men's mental health. In July 2025, he marked a milestone of 1,000 days of sobriety.

He is the founder of Men And Their Emotions (M.A.T.E), a registered charity (No. 1207505) that provides mental health support, peer-to-peer mentoring, and funding for counselling and "dry houses" for men struggling with addiction. The charity grew from a Facebook community which, as of 2025, has over 55,000 members. Since 2019, he has also hosted the podcast Menace to Sobriety (formerly Menace 2 Sobriety), which features candid interviews about addiction and well-being.

== Other ventures ==
=== Celebrity Big Brother ===
In January 2018, O'Reilly entered the Celebrity Big Brother house as a housemate during its twenty-first series. He was the eighth housemate to be evicted.

The Telegraph writer Ed Power wrote an article called 'Should Dapper Laughs Even Be On National Television?' following O'Reilly's entry to the Big Brother house. Power labelled O'Reilly as a 'comedian whose best known accomplishment was torpedoing his career with a rape joke'. Another Telegraph writer, Michael Hogan, wrote an article titled "If Dapper Laughs Wins, It's The Final Nail In The Coffin For Celebrity Big Brother". Hogan remarked that Dapper Laughs is 'not dapper, provides no laughs and isn't really a celebrity.'

=== Boxing ===
On 31 October 2023, Misfits Boxing announced that O'Reilly would have an MF–professional boxing match on the MF & DAZN: X Series 11 preliminary undercard. His opponent, Simple Simon, is a TikToker. The bout took place on 17 November at the York Hall in London where O'Reilly defeated Simon via technical knockout in the first round.

On 24 April 2026, O'Reilly announced a return to the sport of boxing against Jack Kay, also known as the "Ibiza Final Boss." Their bout was scheduled for 16 June at Manchester Arena in Manchester as part of the Misfits 23 – Beauty vs. The Beast undercard, but was cancelled after O'Reilly withdrew for unknown reasons.

== Filmography ==
Year	Title	Role	Notes
2014	Dapper Laughs: On the Pull	Presenter	1 series
2015	Dapper Laughs Live: The Res-Erection	Himself	DVD
2017	Fanged Up	Jimmy Ragsdale	
2018	Celebrity Big Brother	Housemate	Series 21
2022	The Last Heist	Fisherman	

== Discography ==
=== Singles ===
Year	Title	Peak chart positions		Album
Year	Title	UK	SCO	Album
2014	"Proper Moist"	15	35	Non-album single
2014	"Take It to the Base"	-	Unknown	Non-album single

== MF–Professional boxing record ==
2 fights	1 win	0 losses
By knockout	1	0
Draws	1	

No.	Result	Record	Opponent	Type	Round, time	Date	Location	Notes
2	Draw	1–0–1	Joey Essex	SD	4	10 Oct 2026	Copper Box Arena, London, England	
1	Win	1–0	Simple Simon	TKO	1 (4), 1:05	17 Nov 2023	York Hall, London, England	

== Controversies ==
=== 2014 controversies and "retirement" ===
In late 2014, O'Reilly's Dapper Laughs character faced a series of interconnected controversies following the launch of his ITV2 show, Dapper Laughs: On the Pull. In September 2014, the show was widely criticised for being degrading to women. This intensified in November after footage emerged of a live performance at the London Scala, where O'Reilly told a female audience member she was "gagging for a rape."

During this same period, his Christmas album Proper Naughty Christmas came under fire for lyrics deemed offensive to homeless people. Although O'Reilly claimed proceeds would benefit the charity Shelter, the organisation publicly refused his donations following the backlash.

The resulting public outcry, including a petition with over 68,000 signatures, led ITV to announce on 10 November that they would not renew his series for a second season. His UK tour was subsequently cancelled. On 11 November 2014, O'Reilly appeared on Newsnight to announce the "indefinite retirement" of the Dapper Laughs character, though he later resurrected the persona only a month later in December 2014.

=== Glasgow appearance cancellation ===
In March 2015, as part of his return to public appearances, O'Reilly was booked for a "meet and greet" event at the Campus nightclub in Glasgow. The booking sparked immediate controversy due to his previous comments, leading to an online petition that gathered over 1,000 signatures within 24 hours. The venue subsequently cancelled the appearance, releasing a statement that there was "too much negativity towards the act" to proceed.

=== Plagiarism allegations ===
In June 2015, O'Reilly launched the satirical news website DappsDaily. Shortly after its launch, The Guardian and Chortle reported that the site contained articles copied word-for-word from other publications, including Metro and UberPunch, without attribution. Following these allegations, O'Reilly took the website offline, stating on Twitter that the plagiarised articles had been "sent in by people" and that he would review the site's content standards.
