= India Willoughby =

English newsreader (born 1965)

- Born: 2 September 1965 (age 61); London, England
- Occupations: Television newsreader, broadcaster and reality television personality
- Years active: 1986–present
- Television: ITV Border (1999–2010); ITV Tyne Tees and Border (2016); ITV Loose Women (2016); Channel 5, 5News (2017); Channel 5, Big Brother's Bit on the Side (2017); Channel 5, Celebrity Big Brother (2018); ITV, Good Morning Britain (2018–present)
- Children: 1
- Awards: Diversity in Media Award

India Scarlett Willoughby (born 2 September 1965) is an English newsreader, broadcaster, journalist and reality television personality. She is Britain's first transgender national television newsreader and was the first transgender co-host of all-women talk show, Loose Women.

== Early life ==
Willoughby was born in London, but grew up in Carlisle, Cumbria. She has one son.

== Career ==
Willoughby presented the news in the North East and Cumbria as a TV reporter at ITV Border prior to her transition. Willoughby left ITV Border in 2010 and from then until 2015 led a double life, from Monday to Friday living in Newcastle under a female name while working in PR, at the weekends returning home to Carlisle under a male name.

In 2016, after transitioning, she started working as a freelance reporter for ITV Tyne Tees.

In 2017, Willoughby joined 5 News on Channel 5 to read the lunchtime and evening updates, becoming Britain's first transgender national television newsreader. The same year Willoughby was invited onto ITV's Loose Women as a guest. She was later invited back to co-host.

In January 2018, Willoughby took part in Channel 5's Celebrity Big Brother – Year of the Woman.

After Celebrity Big Brother, Willoughby became the victim of social media trolling about her looks. She described herself as "The most hated transgender person in Britain." As a result, she had facial feminisation surgery in Marbella in 2018.

Willoughby appeared on the opening night of GB News in June 2021. She accused the broadcaster Dan Wootton of demonising transgender people.

In 2023, Willoughby was a guest on ITV's Good Morning Britain (GMB) to discuss issues related to the Gender Recognition Reform (Scotland) Bill. To illustrate how gender recognition currently worked she showed her passport, which says "female", to the camera. This caused the host, Susanna Reid, to intervene out of concern that Willoughby might have inadvertently put herself at risk of identity theft.

She has also appeared on programmes including Channel 5's Most Shocking Celebrity Moments 2018 and When News Goes Horribly Wrong 2018.

=== BBC Woman's Hour ===
In 2017, Willoughby was interviewed by Jenni Murray on BBC Woman's Hour. Murray asked Willoughby if she considered herself to be a real woman, to which Willoughby replied "Yes". Murray then asked if it was difficult appearing on an all-women show (Loose Women) to talk about women's issues. Willoughby replied, "No, because I've always been a woman."

Murray then asked Willoughby to comment on a story about London's Dorchester Hotel imposing a new dress code on male and female staff telling them not to display body hair on duty. Willoughby said she supported the rule – because, in a five-star hotel, she felt staff should be groomed and that customers "didn't want to be served soup by someone grubby with hairy legs, because it's not hygienic." Murray later wrote an article in The Times about the interview, stating that transgender women were not real women.

=== Celebrity Big Brother ===
Willoughby was a housemate in the 21st UK season of Celebrity Big Brother (CBB) and subtitled Year of the Woman, to mark the 100th anniversary since women got the vote.

Willoughby described drag as being the equivalent of blackface, sparking strong criticism on social media. A photo later emerged on social media of Willoughby posing with drag queens at Harrogate Pride – though Willoughby said this was a paid engagement, at which she had been asked to have her photograph taken with "colourful characters."

Willoughby was the first CBB 2018 contestant to be evicted, on "Day 11" of the series.

== Online abuse and threats ==
In a December 2022 interview with MyLondon, Willoughby said that she felt suicidal over the hate she received on social media, which she felt worsened after Elon Musk's acquisition of Twitter. She called it a "double-edged sword"; while she enjoyed interacting with her online community, she said there was "no protection" from threats. Willoughby took a break from the website as advised by the police.

On 20 February 2023, Willoughby reported that she had received a "graphic" death threat in a "hand-delivered" letter from the proscribed neo-Nazi terrorist group National Action, the same day anti-racist commentator Shola Mos-Shogbamimu reported receiving a similarly threatening letter from the same group. The following day, it was announced the Metropolitan Police's Counter Terrorism Command had launched an investigation into the threats. Since then, Willoughby has had to live under the Command's protection.

In March 2024, Willoughby became embroiled in a row with author J. K. Rowling on Twitter after Rowling deliberately misgendered Willoughby, referring to her as "cosplaying a misogynistic male fantasy of what a woman is". Willoughby reported Rowling to the police, but Northumbria Police stated that Willoughby's report did not "meet the criminal threshold".

== Awards ==
Willoughby was the 2017 winner of the Diversity in Media Award for Media Moment of the Year (Loose Women). She is a previous nominee for a British LGBT Award (2017).
