= FilmFlex =

Video on demand service

The FilmFlex logo

FilmFlex, was an on-demand movie rental services provider based in the United Kingdom, claiming to be the largest outside the US.

== History ==
=== Front Row ===
On 12 March 1998, a cable-based pay-per-view movie service, Front Row, was launched in the United Kingdom under a joint venture between Telewest, NTL, Diamond Cable, and General Cable. The service, which competed with BSkyB's Sky Box Office service, allowed viewers to watch movies in advance of the standard movie networks and Free-to-Air TV for just £2.99 per film. It was not available on Cable and Wireless, which opted to use Sky Box Office instead. By August, 34% of customers who had access to the service had been purchasing 1-3 movies through it. Telewest announced they had plans to expand the Front Row channels from four to eight on their analogue service by 1999, while NTL announced they would plan to operate over 50 networks on their upcoming digital cable service. In December, the service expanded to offer up boxing matches when ONdigital sub-licensed their exclusive coverage of Mike Tyson matches to them.

The service would become available to Cable and Wireless customers beginning in April 2000 after their contract with Sky for Sky Box Office was not renewed. Front Row expanded its movie offerings in December, now showing over 20 films a day.

=== FilmFlex ===
In November 2004, Sony Pictures Television International, Walt Disney Television International and On Demand Group entered into a joint venture known as MovieCo. The venture was created to operate a pay-per-view on-demand platform on Telewest and NTL. FilmFlex officially launched on Telewest in January 2005, replacing Front Row.

On 26 April 2010, Virgin Media announced the launch of its first online movies service: Virgin Media Online Movies. This allowed streaming of movies through the internet. In November 2010, FilmFlex partnered with Channel 4 to launch an online video on-demand service for Film4 entitled Film4oD.

On 30 October 2011, FilmFlex launched the EE Film store together with EE, to coincide with the launch of its 4G service. In November, HMV partnered with FilmFlex to launch the online video on-demand service HMVon-demand.

On 13 September 2012, FilmFlex's video on-demand service on Virgin Media was renamed Virgin Movies.

On 8 February 2013, FilmFlex signed a multi-year deal with Virgin Media, with investment in the development of next-gen functionality on Virgin Movies, including "multi-device playback" through Virgin TV Anywhere.

In May 2014, FilmFlex was sold to Vubiquity.
