= Ashley James (broadcaster) =

British broadcaster, author and feminist campaigner

- James at the 2026 British Academy Television Awards
- Born: Ashley Louise James; 2 April 1987 (age 39); Northumberland, England
- Education: Sedbergh School; University of Nottingham
- Occupations: Broadcaster; DJ; author; campaigner
- Years active: 2012–present
- Known for: Made in Chelsea; This Morning
- Notable work: Bimbo (2026)
- Website: ashleylouisejames.com

Ashley Louise James (born 2 April 1987) is a British broadcaster, DJ, author, and feminist campaigner. She first became known as a cast member of the E4 reality series Made in Chelsea, which she joined in 2012, and later appeared on Celebrity Big Brother in 2018. She has appeared on ITV's This Morning since 2023 and is the programme's political and social affairs correspondent. Her debut book, Bimbo: Ditch the Labels. Find Your Voice. Reclaim Your Confidence, was published in February 2026. She campaigns on women's rights, women's health, maternal care, online safety and transgender rights.

== Early life and education ==
James was born in Northumberland, the daughter of a dairy farmer and hairdresser who later sold up to run a bed and breakfast. At the age of nine she won a scholarship to a boarding school in Cumbria, Sedbergh School, which had historically been an all-boys school; she has said she was one of 36 girls among 500 pupils. She first gained presenting experience with BBC Radio Cumbria. She attended the University of Nottingham.

== Career ==
=== Reality television and early presenting ===
James joined Made in Chelsea in 2012. According to the Press Association, she was paid £50 per filming session and joined the show hoping it would lead to work as a television presenter. The Radio Times described her as having appeared in several episodes of the show's fifth series in 2013.

After leaving the programme she appeared on Celebrity Dinner Dates and When Celebrity Goes Horribly Wrong, presented segments of Big Brother's Bit on the Side, hosted Facebook Live shows for Hollyoaks and fronted Style Stars on PopGirlTV and at The Clothes Show Live. In February 2015 she began presenting a Friday afternoon music show on Hoxton Radio. She also worked as a DJ, including engagements in Dubai and Ibiza, and as a model.

In January 2018 she was one of the housemates who entered on the all-female launch night of Celebrity Big Brother: Year of the Woman on Channel 5, a series themed around the centenary of women's suffrage in the UK.

=== Broadcasting and writing ===
James first appeared on This Morning in 2023, and became the programme's political and social affairs correspondent. On the programme she has debated commentators including Piers Morgan, Nick Ferrari, and Bonnie Blue. She hosts the parenting podcast Mum's the Word.

In December 2025 she appeared on BBC Two's Celebrity Mastermind, with the suffragette Lady Constance Lytton as her specialist subject.

Her first book, Bimbo: Ditch the Labels. Find Your Voice. Reclaim Your Confidence, was published by Century on 12 February 2026. Described by the Press Association as a "rallying cry for women", it combines memoir with commentary on sexism, misogyny, body image and the labels applied to women, and takes its title from an insult she said had been directed at her since her youth. The Women's Prize described it as a number one Sunday Times bestseller.

== Activism ==
Women's Health described James in 2026 as "one of the most prominent and accessible feminist voices in the UK". Her campaigning covers the following areas.

=== Sexism and body image ===
During Celebrity Big Brother in 2018 she spoke about being judged for her accent and background, and about sexism in DJing, saying club-goers asked whether she was really performing her sets, which "they'd never ask a male DJ". During her Made in Chelsea period, she posted an unretouched underwear photograph on Instagram as a response to the Victoria's Secret Fashion Show, which Women's Health identifies as the start of her public pushback on the treatment of women's bodies. In Bimbo and related interviews she discussed body dysmorphia, disordered eating and self-harm, and criticised diet culture and post-pregnancy "bounce-back" expectations.

=== Inclusive language and transgender rights ===
In April 2024, on This Morning, she responded to reports that Penny Mordaunt had told officials to stop using "woke language", arguing that being "woke" meant "being alert to social injustice" and that inclusive terminology did not take away from the role of mothers. Women's Health reports that she advocates for the trans community and has endorsed the Green Party.

=== Online safety and Girlguiding ===
As an ambassador for Girlguiding, James met the Online Safety Minister, Baroness Jones of Whitchurch, with a group of Guides in June 2025 to discuss online harms affecting girls, calling for social media companies to be "held accountable" and describing abuse, doxxing and harassment she had experienced on anonymous gossip websites. After Girlguiding announced on 2 December 2025 that it would no longer admit transgender girls, following the Supreme Court ruling of April 2025 on the meaning of "sex" in equality law, James resigned as an ambassador "with immediate effect", saying of trans girls: "they are not a threat to us. They are our sisters".

=== Motherhood and maternal care ===
James has spoken about a traumatic first birth in January 2021, after which she was diagnosed with a rectocele, and about postnatal depression and suicidal thoughts, criticising what she described as a "systemic neglect" of postnatal care. In March 2025 she supported MAM's #RightToSoothe campaign against judgement of parents who use dummies. She has also spoken about "mum-shaming" and what she called "internalised misogyny aimed at mums". According to Women's Health, she has defended single mothers' right to IVF on the NHS on Good Morning Britain.

=== Sexual violence and victim-blaming ===
In February 2026, ahead of the publication of Bimbo, James said publicly for the first time that she had been raped by a male friend while a student at the University of Nottingham. She cited the case of Gisèle Pelicot as the reason she chose to speak, and argued against victim blaming.

=== Period poverty and women's health ===
In March 2026 James was the spokesperson for "Cost of Bleeding", a campaign by the cycle-tracking app Clue estimating the lifetime cost of menstruation at £20,359, and backed its petition calling for period products to be made free and widely available in England.

== Personal life ==
James lives in south-west London with her partner, Tommy Andrews, and their two children. She has said she does not want to marry. The family moved to Essex during the COVID-19 lockdown before returning to London.
