= Film4 =

British free-to-air network devoted to broadcasting films

- Logo used since 2018
- Country: United Kingdom

Programming
- Language: English
- Picture format: 1080i HDTV(downscaled to 576i for the SDTV feed)
- Timeshift service: Film4 +1

Ownership
- Owner: Channel Four Television Corporation
- Sister channels: Channel 4; 4seven; E4; E4 Extra; More4

History
- Launched: 1 November 1998; 28 years ago
- Former names: FilmFour (1998–2006)

Links
- Website: channel4.com/collection/film4

Availability

Terrestrial
- Freeview: Channel 14; Channel 47 (+1)

Streaming media
- Channel 4: Watch live
- FilmOn: Watch live
- Sky Go: Watch live (UK and Ireland only)

Film4 is a British free-to-air public broadcast television channel owned by Channel Four Television Corporation launched on 1 November 1998, dedicated to broadcasting films. The standard-definition channel is available on Freeview and Freesat platforms, while the high-definition variant is offered free on Freely, and as a pay television service on satellite and cable.

The channel offered an online video on demand service, Film4oD, until it was closed in July 2015.

== History ==
=== 1998–2001: Early years and launch ===
The network has its origins in Channel Four Films, a production company opened by Channel Four Television Corporation in 1982 which has been responsible for backing a large number of films made in the United Kingdom and around the world. The company's first production was Stephen Frears' Walter, which was released in the same year.

In the late 1990s, FilmFour Productions partnered with Showtime Australia in its first foreign co-financing venture, with Miranda Dear appointed in 1996 as production and acquisition consultant. During this time the collaboration produced John Polson's Siam Sunset and Mark Lamprell's My Mother Frank in Australia. Dear left FilmFour in July 2000, to became commissioning editor of drama at SBS independent (the production arm of public broadcaster SBS), after which FilmFour closed its Australian office.

With the upcoming launch of digital terrestrial television, Channel 4 planned the creation of a subscription movie channel, Channel 4 Film Club, which would broadcast art house films. In 1997, it announced that it would sell the channel on a wholesale basis to TV providers, which would control the channel's pricing, marketing and availability.

On 1 November 1998, the production company was re-branded as FilmFour to coincide with the launch of a new digital television channel of the same name on both Sky and ONdigital platforms, becoming Channel 4's second network. At its launch, it was a subscription-only service costing £6 a month, eventually rising to £7. The launch night (which also broadcasts on Channel 4) was hosted by Johnny Vaughan and the first film to be shown was What's Eating Gilbert Grape, as well as the launch evening also featured its British network television premiere of The Usual Suspects.

On 31 March 2000 at 6.00am, the analogue version of FilmFour shut down and later switched to digital.

=== 2001–2006: Expansion ===
On 7 April 2001, FilmFour expanded with the launch of three additional digital networks. FilmFour World carried the best of international cinema and broadcast from 4:00pm to 10:00pm, while FilmFour Extreme carried "controversial and cutting-edge" movies, and broadcast from 10:00pm–4:00am, both of which operated on a timeshare. The other addition was the timeshift service FilmFour +1, which carried all of the main channel's films an hour later. All three channels were initially exclusive to Sky Digital but were made available on NTL cable from November–December 2001.

In July 2002, Channel 4 reduced FilmFour's budget from £30 to £10 million and cut 50 staff to curb mounting losses, reintegrating FilmFour as a division of its television operation to continue to invest in new films. The cuts were a consequence of FilmFour's unsuccessful attempts to compete with Hollywood. David Thompson, head of BBC Films described it as:

A very sad day for the British film industry. The British film industry needs confidence right now and this doesn't inspire confidence.

Also in the same year, Tessa Ross became the head of both FilmFour and Channel 4 drama.

On 31 March 2003, Channel 4 announced that FilmFour Extreme and FilmFour World would be replaced with a singular network - FilmFour Weekly, on 5 May. FilmFour Weekly was formatted as a "catch-up" network, broadcasting three movies across the week at the same time each day. Films that previously broadcast on Extreme and World would move to the regular FilmFour.

=== 2006–present: Transition to free-to-air ===
On 3 July 2006, Channel 4 announced that FilmFour would relaunch as a free-to-air network on 23 July, as it would see its addition to Freeview, and begin to air advertisements during films. The channel would also be renamed as Film4, alongside its timeshift service and the production company. The original subscription version of FilmFour and FilmFour +1 closed for the final time on 19 July, with FilmFour Weekly also ceasing broadcast to make way for the relaunch. The new free-to-air Film4 launched on 23 July at 9 pm, with the UK free-to-air premiere of Lost in Translation as its first film. Due to the change, the channel's availability increased from 300,000 (subscribers) to 18 million households. It also changed its broadcasting hours from 12.45pm to 8.45am to 3.00pm to 3.00am. The switch to becoming a free channel meant it also lost the ability to adhere to looser broadcasting regulations regarding content on subscription channels - it thus now routinely edits films to make them suitable for pre-watershed screenings before 9pm and removes particularly explicit content from the more extreme material it shows after that time. Most post-9pm films are unedited though.

Prior to the arrivals of Movie Mix and Movies4Men on the Freeview platform, Film4 was the only free film channel available on digital terrestrial television.

In 2007, the broadcasting hours were amended to 1.00pm to 4.00am. On 20 August 2007, Film4 +1 was removed from Freeview to make way for Channel 4 +1. From 23 May 2009, the broadcasting hours were amended again to 11.00am to 4.00am, with the downtime hours broadcasting either teleshopping or an animated caption screen stating when the channel will return. On 20 July 2010, a high-definition simulcast – Film4 HD launched exclusively on Virgin Media's cable television platform on channel 429, only available on certain packages. On 1 November 2010, Film4 partnered with FilmFlex to launch Film4oD. On 27 August 2013, Film4 +1 returned to Freeview. Film4 HD launched on Sky on 2 September 2013 as a subscription network, requiring Sky's HD package. Film4 HD is not available on Freeview.

On 2 September 2014, Film4 debuted a new on-air look, designed by Man vs. Machine. There are 16 new idents in the series which run alongside a new on-screen presentation. On 26 November 2014, Film4 +1 became available via Freeview HD services only. On 10 January 2019, Film4 +1 was moved from the Freeview HD PSB3 (DVB-T2) multiplex to the Freeview PSB2 (DVB-T) multiplex, making the service available once again to viewers with non-HD Freeview systems and television sets that are incapable of decoding DVB-T2 signals. The capacity on PSB2 was made available by the "Sewing Quarter" service moving to Freeview COM6 (DVB-T) multiplex operated by Arqiva.

=== Former logos ===
First FilmFour logo (1998–2006)

Second Film4 logo (2006–2018)

Logo of timeshifted version; "Film4 +1"

Logo of high-definition version; "Film4 HD"

== See also ==
- 50 Films to See Before You Die
- London FrightFest Film Festival
- Carlton Cinema
- Sky Cinema
