= PictureBox Films =

Video-on-demand Film service

PictureBox

Programming
- Picture format: 16:9 / 4:3, 576i (SDTV) / 1080i (HDTV)

Ownership
- Owner: NBCUniversal

History
- Launched: November 2006

Links
- Website: www.pictureboxfilms.com

PictureBox is a video on demand film service offering a selection of films and TV series carried within monthly SVOD subscriptions. It launched in 2006 and has been available as a separate subscription through several Digital TV service providers in selected countries such as United Kingdom, Russia, Romania and Central and Latin America (Mexico, Colombia and Brazil). PictureBox was the first only wholly owned SVOD (subscription video on demand service) operated by NBCUniversal. PictureBox currently operates in Russia and CIS. In UK and Central and Latin America replaced by Peacock and Romania, Moldova, Russia and CIS replaced into SkyShowtime.

== Business model ==
PictureBox differentiates itself from other subscription video on demand services by offering subscribers a 'hand-picked' selection of films and TV series, which are rotated each month. Users do not pay per film or series; for a monthly subscription they have access to any available films and TV series and can watch these titles as many times as they choose.

== PictureBox digital TV service ==
=== Russia & CIS ===
In Russia, PictureBox is available through the providers Rostelecom, IVI, KION and Okko. In Ukraine, PictureBox is available through the providers Sweet TV and MEGOGO.
