= Ruwido =

ruwido austria gmbh
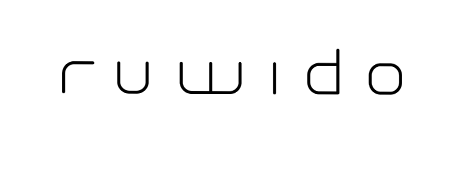
- Company type: Ltd
- Industry: Electronics, Consumer Electronics
- Founded: 1969
- Headquarters: Neumarkt am Wallersee (Salzburg-Umgebung District), Salzburg (state), Austria
- Area served: Worldwide
- Owner: Ferdinand Maier
- Number of employees: 170
- Website: www.ruwido.com

ruwido austria gmbh is an Austrian technology company based in Neumarkt am Wallersee near Salzburg.

The company was founded in 1969.

== Technology ==
The company is specialized in design, technology and scientific research in navigation and user experience.
