= The Fashion Show (British TV series) =

- Presented by: Abbey Clancy; George Lamb; Michelle De Swarte
- Country of origin: United Kingdom
- Original language: English
- No. of series: 1
- No. of episodes: 10

Production
- Executive producer: Sebastian Scott
- Producer: Princess Productions
- Running time: 60 minutes

Original release
- Network: ITV2
- Release: 11 September – 13 November 2008

The Fashion Show is a British television programme which debuted on ITV2 on 11 September 2008. The programme was originally titled The Fashion Project.

The show originally aired at 8pm on ITV2 as part of XXL Thursday, the show was moved to an earlier 7pm slot for episodes 4–8 to accommodate CelebAir which was moved due to poor ratings, the show returned to its original 8pm slot for the final 2 episodes.
