= Cable & Wireless =

Cable & Wireless refers to three telecommunications businesses:

- Cable & Wireless plc, the original business, established in 1869 and split in 2010
  - Cable & Wireless HKT, a Hong Kong–based former subsidiary
- Cable & Wireless Communications, the former mainly Caribbean division of Cable & Wireless plc, demerged in 2010 and since integrated into Liberty Global
- Cable & Wireless Worldwide, renamed following the demerger of Cable & Wireless Communications and now integrated into Vodafone
