= Dapper Laughs: On the Pull =

- Created by: Daniel O'Reilly
- Presented by: Daniel O'Reilly
- Country of origin: United Kingdom
- Original language: English
- No. of series: 1
- No. of episodes: 6

Production
- Running time: 30 minutes
- Production companies: Hungry Bear Media; Big Minded

Original release
- Network: ITV2
- Release: 29 September – 3 November 2014

Dapper Laughs: On the Pull is a British television dating show which mixed comedy sketches with real-life situations and featured comedian Daniel O'Reilly, in character as Dapper Laughs, offering dating tips to members of the public. O'Reilly was discovered through his Vine posts, and the show was largely based on these.

The show was criticised as sexist and promoting violence against women. Following these criticisms and a campaign to have the show discontinued, ITV announced that a second series would not be commissioned.
