= V+ =

Set-top box for Virgin Media's Virgin TV service

V+ (previously known as TVDrive) is a set-top box for Virgin Media's Virgin TV service, which provides personal video recording (PVR) and high definition (HD) functionality to customers who subscribe to the service. Virgin TV have taken a different approach from rival Sky's Sky+ and later Sky+ HD services, by implementing a rental scheme for the V+ Box. When Virgin TV was launched, there was an installation charge (waived under certain circumstances) and a monthly charge for all customers with a discount for XL customers. On 1 June 2007 pricing was revised, with all customers paying a one-off set-up fee and TV M and L customers paid a monthly charge, while TV XL customers had no extra charges. Various deals to lower the set-up fee have been made available to all customers in order to compete with rival Sky.

The V+ set-top box is technically on lease, still owned by Virgin Media, who provide technical support for it free of charge if a problem occurs for the life of a contract. Should the customer downgrade from the V+ service, the recording functions of the V+ box and access to all high definition channels and on demand content will be blocked, effectively acting as a standard V Box. As of Q1 2010, there were a total of 939,900 V+ customers, representing 25% of all Virgin TV subscribers.

== History ==
Telewest's TVDrive logo

The V+ Box derives from Telewest's silver TVDrive, and was initially only available to Telewest cable customers. The TVDrive began roll-out on 1 December 2005 on a commercial pilot basis before a full launch in March 2006, becoming the first HD service in the UK. Due to the merger between NTL and Telewest, the TVDrive was made available to NTL cable customers in the Teesside and Glasgow areas on 16 November 2006, in turn NTL ceased development of their MPEG-4 compatible HD PVR, the Scientific-Atlanta Explorer 8450DVB. In January 2007, NTL:Telewest began renting the set-top box nationwide and since the licensing of the Virgin Media name, it became officially available in all areas with the new V+ branding and the colour changed from silver to black.

On 24 November 2009, Virgin Media entered into a strategic partnership with TiVo. Under the mutually exclusive agreement, TiVo developed a converged television and broadband interactive interface to power Virgin Media's next generation, high definition set-top boxes. The terms of the deal were not disclosed. TiVo became the exclusive provider of middleware and user interface software for Virgin Media's next generation set-top boxes. Virgin Media became the exclusive distributor of TiVo services and technology in the United Kingdom. Virgin Media first TiVo co-branded product was released in 2010.

From February 2012, the V+ is only carried as a replacement for faulty V+ boxes, or sometimes offered as a secondary set-top box in the home and is now being phased out.

The only Virgin TV units supported nowadays are the TiVo and the V6 box, and the newest 360 and 360 Mini boxes. The V6 unit was the last model based on the TiVo technology. However, it (as well as the newest 360-based boxes) only supports a HDMI connection to a TV set (the SCART port is disabled and not supported) and it requires a valid Virgin Media broadband connection via Ethernet or Wi-Fi (unlike the original TiVo which featured a built-in data modem for interactive features). If these conditions are not met, an original TiVo must be installed and used.

== Technical specifications ==
The V+ Boxes have three video tuners, allowing the user to record two programmes to the hard drive while watching a live programme which can then be paused. V+'s main competitor on the British market, the Sky+ HD box, has two tuners. As with all other digital set-top boxes from Virgin Media. The set-top boxes support 720p and 1080i high definition video via HDMI and component output and is capable of upscaling SD video to HD resolutions. The copying of some programmes may be restricted by using HDCP. The set-top boxes also support Dolby Digital 5.1 surround sound, which is currently broadcast on some HD channels and video on demand (VOD) content. Both set-top boxes support DVB-C transmission using MPEG-2 compression, the standard used by Virgin for both SD and HD video.

Currently only two models of V+ have been released, the original Scientific-Atlanta Explorer 8300DVB and the newer Samsung SMT-H3110, which was released on 3 March 2009 on a trial basis followed by a full launch on 3 August 2009 after a 1-year delay.

There have been five remote control models, starting with the type 7 which was replaced by the type 8 during the V+ branding exercise; both are manufactured by Philips. The type 9 was released during September 2009, followed by the type 10; both are manufactured by Ruwido using their 'r series' remote controls. On 22 March 2010, Ruwido announced that Virgin had gone for Ruwido's 'Unified' remote control for their new type 11 and 12: only the latter is available with the V+.

=== Scientific-Atlanta Explorer 8300DVB ===
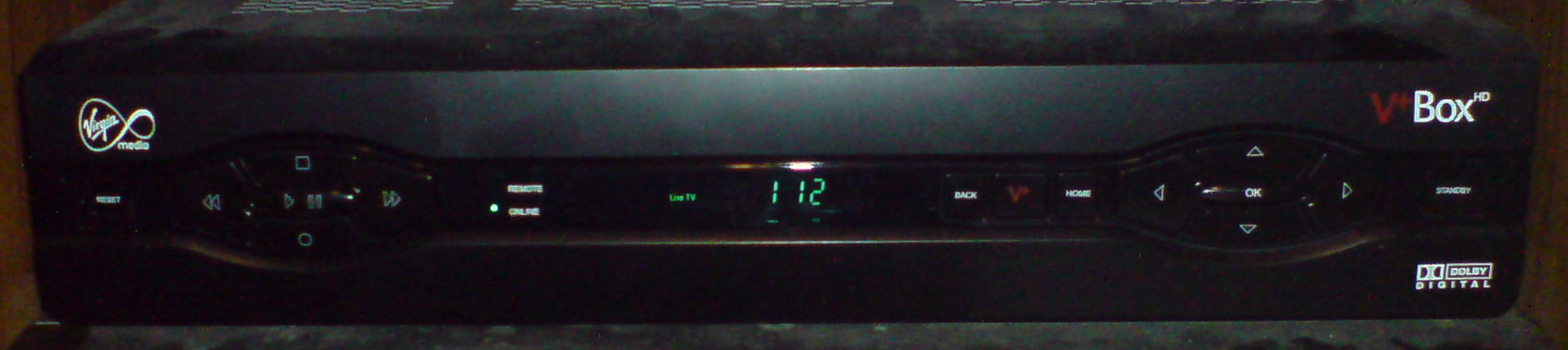
Front view of the Scientific-Atlanta V+ Box

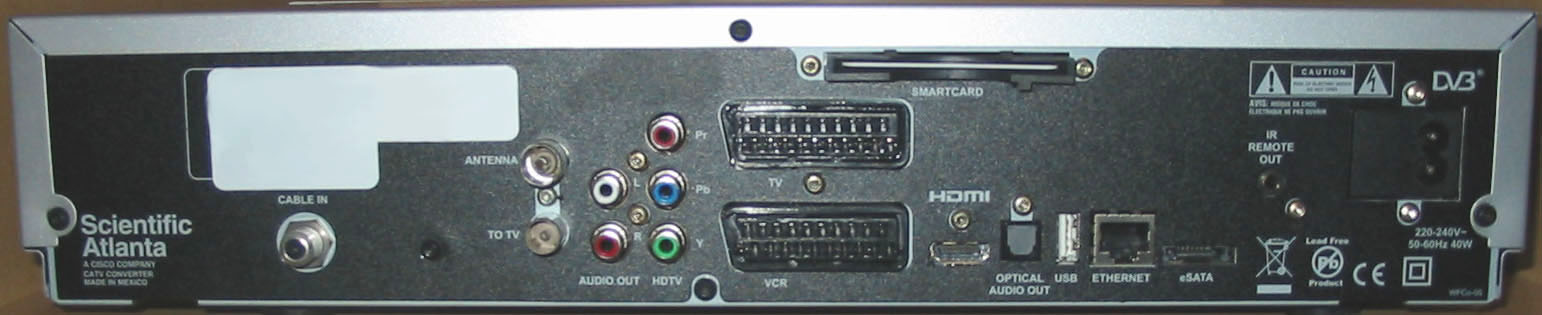
Scientific-Atlanta TVDrive rear panel

The Explorer 8300DVB set-top box from Scientific-Atlanta, uses two 250 MIPS 32-bit RISC processors, 4 tuners (3 video, 1 data), a DOCSIS 1.x cable modem, a full graphics engine, 2 HD and SD video decoders, dual audio decoders and contains one Western Digital or Maxtor 160GB PATA hard disk, capable of storing up to 20 hours of HD Content or up to 80 hours of SD content.

For connectivity the Explorer 8300DVB box has 1 HDMI output, 1 YPbPr HD Component output, 2 Scart Outputs, 1 optical audio output, 1 dual channel analogue phono output and an RF input and output. There is also an Ethernet socket for Internet access, a powered USB port and an eSATA port which are currently disabled but may be enabled in the future for external storage.

The Explorer 8300DVB has been criticised for having blurred menus when set to 1080i, inability to record radio and its slow response to changing channels.

=== Samsung SMT-H3110 ===
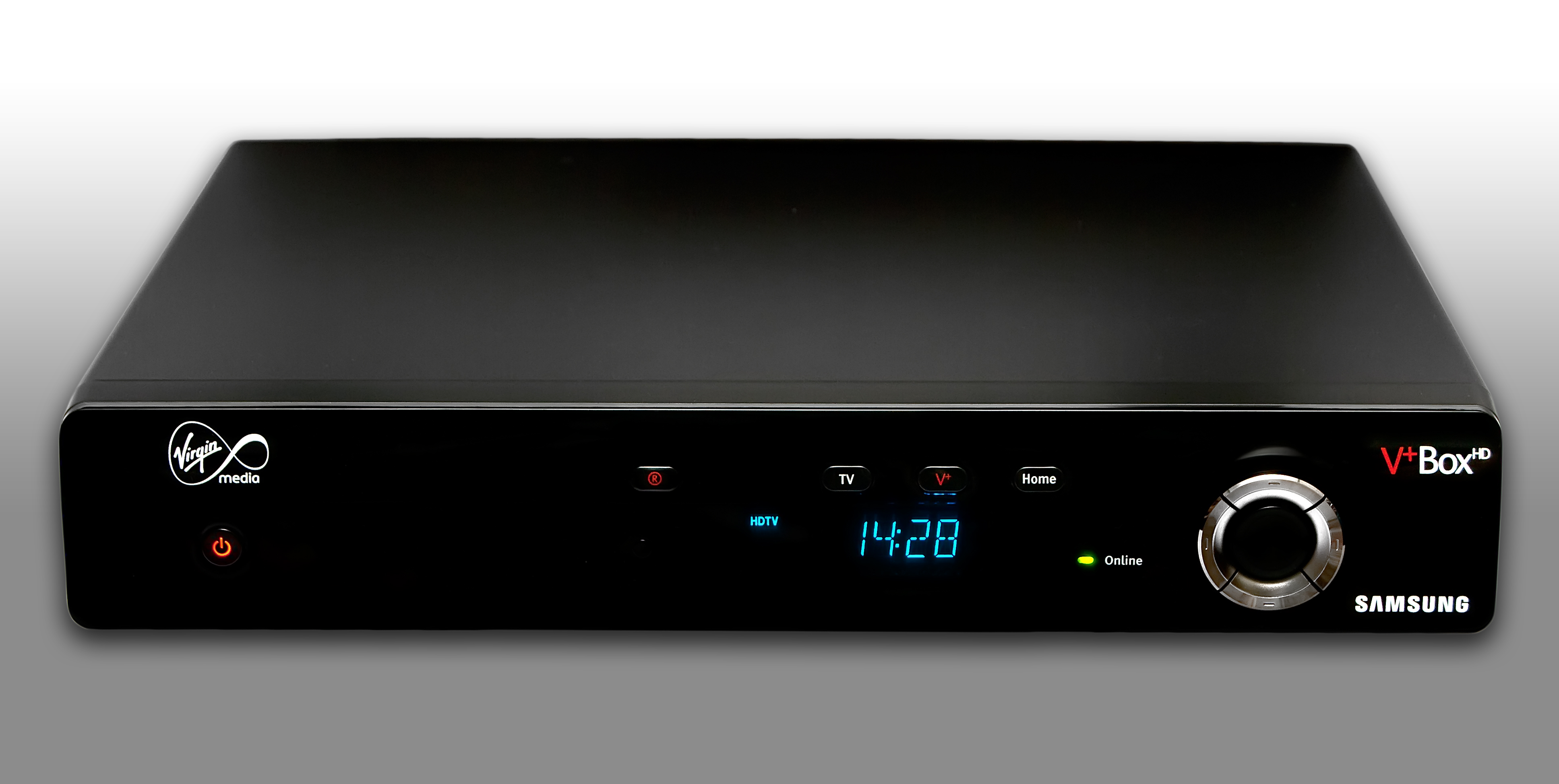
Front view of the Samsung V+ Box

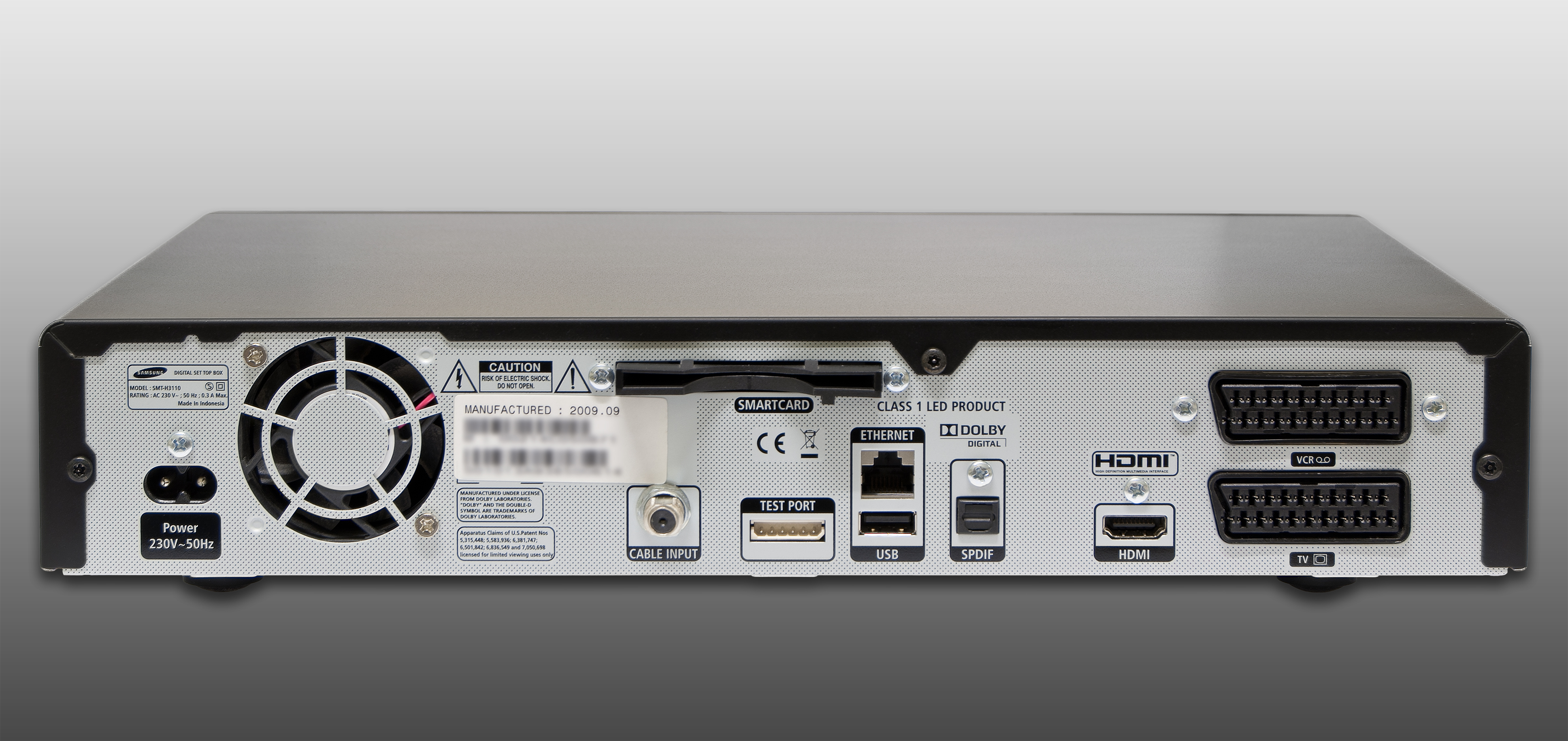
Samsung V+ Box rear panel

The SMT-H3110 set-top box from Samsung Electronics, has 1 HDMI output, 2 Scart Outputs and 1 optical audio output. There is also an Ethernet socket for Internet access, a powered USB port, an exhaust fan at the rear and a Western Digital 160GB SATA hard disk, capable of storing up to 20 hours of HD Content or up to 80 hours of SD content.

Unlike the Explorer 8300DVB, the on-screen display and subtitles are output on the VCR Scart, when set to standard definition it is impossible to watch another channel during the archiving process and there is also the ability to record radio. MPEG-4 compatibility has also been included for future use.

== See also ==
- Virgin Media
- High-definition television
- High-definition television in the United Kingdom
