= ITV2 =

British free-to-air television channel

- Logo used since 15 November 2022
- Country: United Kingdom; Isle of Man; Channel Islands

Programming
- Language: English
- Picture format: 1080i HDTV (downscaled to 16:9 576i for the SDTV feed)
- Timeshift service: ITV2 +1

Ownership
- Owner: ITV plc
- Sister channels: ITV1; ITV3; ITV4; ITV Quiz

History
- Launched: 7 December 1998; 27 years ago (England and Wales); 27 July 2001; 25 years ago (Scotland); 22 January 2002; 24 years ago (Northern Ireland)
- Replaced: S2 (Scotland); UTV2 (Northern Ireland)

Links
- Website: www.itv.com

Availability

Terrestrial
- Freeview: Channel 6 (SD); Channel 29 (+1)

Streaming media
- ITVX: Watch live (UK only)
- Sky Go: Watch live (UK only)
- Virgin TV Go: Watch live (UK only); Watch live (+1) (UK only)

ITV2 is a British free-to-air public broadcast television channel owned by ITV plc. It was launched on 7 December 1998. For a number of years, it had the largest audience share after the five analogue terrestrial stations, a claim now held by its sister service ITV3 both of which are freely available to a majority of households.

The channel is primarily aimed at the 16–34 age group, similar to BBC Three and E4, and is known for American programming such as adult animations Family Guy, American Dad! and Bob's Burgers; repeats of recently aired episodes of soap operas and other entertainment programming from ITV such as Coronation Street, Emmerdale and Catchphrase; original comedy such as Celebrity Juice and Plebs; and reality formats such as Big Brother and Love Island.

== Broadcasting ==
=== Satellite ===
- Freesat UK: Channel 113 (HD) & Channel 114 (+1)
- Sky UK: Channel 118 (HD) & Channel 218 (+1)

=== Terrestrial ===
- Freeview UK: Channel 6 (SD) & Channel 29 (+1)

=== Cable ===
- Virgin Media: Channel 115 (HD), Channel 315 (+1)

=== IPTV ===
- Freely: Channel 6 (HD)

== History ==
Prior to the launch of Channel 4 in 1982, the name "ITV2" had sometimes been used to refer informally to an envisioned second commercial network in the UK. However, the name resurfaced in the late 1990s for very different reasons. The launch of digital terrestrial television services in the UK saw each existing analogue terrestrial broadcaster given a slice of bandwidth with which to carry their existing service after the analogue switch off, with space left over for new channels. While strictly speaking this space belonged to each regional contractor for use within their own region, ITV had undergone a series of buyouts earlier in the decade; the three players operating the majority of the network, Granada, Carlton, and United News & Media, jointly launched ITV2 in 1998 to be broadcast to most of the country as a uniform service. While free-to-air, it was marketed alongside their own subscription based ONdigital platform. Other ITV licencees, SMG, UTV and GMTV launched their own services in the space (see below).

Ahead of a proposed white paper for digital broadcasting in the summer of 1995, ITV already had interest in launching ITV2, which would broadcast in widescreen. One of the likely possibilities for the new channel was the airing of repeats of programmes from the main ITV channel or sporting events. The new channel would be a concerted group effort between the various ITV franchise owners, as they would have shares in the channel. Moreover, it would be a centralised channel from the outset, without relying on the federal structure of the existing channel.

ITV2 was announced in May 1998, and the channel's original controller was Brian Barwick. Most of the programmes were repeats, but these would enable viewers to catch up with recent ITV programmes. Airing of retro output was ruled out, because it did not have the intention of becoming another archive channel. Among the ideas for original programmes included a daily teenage talk show set to air on weekdays, a late night half-hour review of the week's ITV soaps, a pop music review show to air during peak time, an interactive sports magazine programme and a football-themed game show. There would also be coverage of alternative sports, such as golf, basketball and snow boarding. Within days of the announcement, independent production company Chrysalis hoped to provide programmes for the channel. Snooker coverage was announced in June, with two new tournaments being created specifically for the new channel. At the time, the channel had an awareness rate of just 5%. The channel was initially due to launch in November, but it had already faced a potential problem based on low ratings, based on the possibility of airing Manchester United and Arsenal matches for the upcoming Champions League season, but would see a decrease when the group phase was expected to end in December.

In July, Julia Lamaison was appointed its director of broadcasting, as part of its two-channel strategy for digital broadcasting. The original plan of making it a youth-centric channel was superseded by a broader, mixed-genre and mixed-demographic format, countering the plan to downsize ITV1's age to be closer to ITV2's. It had an 80-hour a week schedule, running 4pm-2am on weekdays and 9:30am-2:30am on weekends. Programming was balanced between 50% catch-up material (repeats, also labelled as "the nation's VCR"), original programming which would take up a quarter or a third of the total offer, and the rest being imports. The channel had a launch budget of £221 million, little more than double of Channel 5 in its launch the previous year, which was £110 million. Discussion on advertising minutage were underway, being managed by a three-way advertising house managed by Carlton, Granada and UNM. Advertisers that were not on the main ITV channel were keen on appearing on ITV2. It was also confirmed that ITV2 would become a priority for analogue cable services, which were already at full capacity. An agreement to carry the channel on Cable & Wireless Communications' analogue cable service was signed in November, coinciding with the launch of the first digital transmitters in England and Wales. The channel was also part of a low-cost package unveiled in early October. The channel was expected to cover 500,000 households with digital television by year-end 1999. Advertising adopted a flexible strategy, sold on a fixed-price basis.

ITV2 launched at 7:00 pm on 7 December 1998. The first programme was an hour-long introductory programme called It Takes Two, presented by Gabby Logan and Vinnie Jones. Billie Piper was heavily involved in the channel's promotion at launch, with an updated version of the 1966 song It Takes Two sung by her used as the theme song for the launch programme and featured in the original promos for the channel. The programme featured messages from Michael Barrymore, Trevor McDonald, Boyzone's Ronan Keating, Jerry Springer and Samantha Janus. A highlight of opening night was Trevor McDonald's interview to Fergie, which was plagued with concerns of possible low ratings before it even aired. Estimated statistics revealed that the channel had limited terrestrial coverage, as well as a potential audience of 850,000 cable subscribers.

While ITV2 is now an entertainment channel aimed to a younger audience; at its launch in 1998, it was a mixed genre channel and featured some programmes aimed at much older audiences than what the channel broadcasts currently. Despite this, the channel was launched to target a younger, more male audience. Such original programmes were mostly produdced on a low budget, including a late night music programme aimed at teenagers, Bed Rock, plus studio-based game shows.

Much of the original content in its launch schedule was current affairs related programming fronted by ITV newscasters. Katie Derham presented a weekly media analysis programme called Wide Angle, John Suchet fronted a weekly current affairs discussion programme called Who, What, Why, and Trevor McDonald presented an interview series, Trevor McDonald Meets.... These three programmes all ran on Sunday nights.

There were repeats of popular ITV programmes including Midsomer Murders, Inspector Morse, A Touch of Frost, Heartbeat, Who Wants to Be a Millionaire?, Gladiators, CD:UK, Don't Try This at Home, Trisha, This Morning, Loose Women and My Wonderful Life, American acquisitions such as Judge Judy, The Jerry Springer Show, The Late Show with David Letterman and Maggie Winters, omnibus editions of ITV soaps Emmerdale, Coronation Street, The Bill and Home and Away, and a Saturday football results service called Football First, which was promoted to ITV1 in 2001 (while maintaining an ITV2 slot) and rebranded as The Goal Rush. Other launch programmes included youth magazine show Bedrock and Soap Fever which taken a look at the UK's major television soap operas. There was also live coverage of the UEFA Champions League among a range of other sports coverage. Many of the older-skewing drama series were dropped after the launch of ITV3 in 2004, and the launch of ITV4 the year later saw ITV2 ditch sports coverage, except on certain occasions as overspill.

The channel underwent a mass repositioning as a general entertainment channel, starting a £500,000 campaign to increase awareness, fronted by Jerry Springer. This was due to mixed messages regarding the channel's format, which has changed since launch. Commercial director Andrew Chowns denied that this had to do with Channel 4's plan to launch E4, and that this would entice viewers to "stay" with the ITV family of channels. A website was also launched, in order to increase its takeup among web users.

In June 2004, ITV plc announced that they were going to double the channel's programme budget and would add more American series and movies. On 1 November 2004, in an attempt to launch ITV3 on Sky, ITV2 moved from 175 to 118 on Sky after ITV plc bought GSkyB for £10 million. As a result, Plus was permanently closed down, with its EPG slot taken by ITV3.

On 10 October 2006, ITV announced the launch of a one-hour timeshift service of ITV2, ITV2+1. The channel launched on 30 October 2006 along with ITV3 +1.

In November 2006, ITV2 commissioned its first soap opera, Echo Beach. The series was to be interlinked with ITV1's comedy-drama Moving Wallpaper. In the end however, Echo Beach was broadcast on ITV1 instead of ITV2 as was originally planned.

ITV2 and its one-hour timeshift channel began broadcasting 24 hours a day on 17 March 2008. The hours formerly held by GMTV2 were moved to ITV4. GMTV2 programming moved from ITV2 to ITV4. On 20 August 2008, ITV2 unveiled a new look. The logo was given a 3D look, with six new idents. The new look co-incided with a line-up of new programmes including Celebrity Juice, CelebAir, The Fashion Show and No Heroics.

ITV2 was launched on UPC Ireland in the Republic of Ireland on 4 January 2010, marking the first time the channel has been officially available in the country. The channel had already been (and remains) available to Irish viewers on free-to-air satellite for some time, however, it is still not listed in the Sky electronic programme guide. On 1 April 2011, ITV2 was removed from UPC Ireland along with ITV3 and ITV4 due to the expiry of a carriage agreement between UPC and ITV. UPC Ireland claim that ITV is not in a position to renegotiate the deal because ITV had struck a deal with another channel provider to provide it with exclusive rights to air certain content from the channels. Conversely, UPC Ireland also claims to have been in discussions right up to the last moment to continue broadcasting the channels. ITV2, ITV3 and ITV4 were restored to the UPC Ireland line‑up on 20 December 2011. Virgin Media One and its sister channel Virgin Media Two already hold carriage agreement to air certain ITV content within the Republic of Ireland, alternatively UTV is available within the Republic. ITV2 is available along with ITV3 and ITV4 within Switzerland, all three channels are available on SwisscomTV and UPC Cablecom. ITV2 is registered to broadcast within the European Union/EEA through ALIA in Luxembourg.

From 11 January 2011, ITV2 +1 on the Freeview platform has changed its broadcasting hours to 7:00 pm until 4:00 am. On 1 June 2011, an additional hour was added in England, Northern Ireland and Scotland, allowing ITV2 +1 to start at 6:00 pm. On 2 August 2011, ITV2 +1 began to broadcast 24 hours a day on Freeview across the UK, using an eleventh stream created on mux A.

As part of the changes, ITV2 +1 swapped slots on Sky's electronic programme guide with Men & Motors, resulting in the timeshift channel making a significant jump from channel 184 to 131. It is now Sky 218.

ITV2 was made available on Freeview in the Channel Islands on 29 February 2012, a few months after ITV plc bought Channel Television from Yattendon Group plc.

In February 2014, ITV2 announced it was to focus more on entertainment programming, specifically drama and comedy panel shows – with reality TV and lifestyle, such as The Only Way is Essex spun off to a new channel, ITVBe. This shift was not for long; however, as in 2015, the revival of Love Island premiered on ITV2, and has since become the channel's flagship programme.

On 23 March 2015, it was announced that ITV2 had acquired the rights to broadcast US animated comedy Family Guy, which had previously been airing on competing youth channel BBC Three. At the same time, ITV also bought the rights to American Dad!, The Cleveland Show and Bordertown. They began airing on ITV2 on 29 February 2016.

When sport was moved to ITV4, this meant no sports would air on ITV2. However, ITV4 was an evening only service on weekdays and so, ITV2 would broadcast weekday daytime sports, including games from the 2006 FIFA World Cup. The weekend daytime sports coverage was broadcast on ITV4. On 20 June 2016, ITV2 simulcast ITV's coverage of a UEFA Euro 2016 match between England and Slovakia to allow ITV in Wales to broadcast its own coverage of the match between Wales and Russia (this match was also shown on ITV4). It was repeated in 2021 for the UEFA Euro 2020 match between England and the Czech Republic to allow STV in Scotland to broadcast its own coverage of the match between Scotland and Croatia (this match was also shown on ITV4). In September 2020, ITV2 broadcast the British Touring Car Championship rather than ITV4 as the channel was broadcasting both the Tour de France and World Series of Darts, and ITV3 broadcast ITV Racing.

In November 2021, the channel moved into the true crime genre with The Social Media Murders, a three-part documentary series with a different case examined every night, over three days. A second series debuted on ITVX in March 2023 with repeats on ITV1.

In March 2022, ITV announced that their new reality game show Loaded in Paradise, which sees teams in Greece trying to win a chance of spending the prize pot of 50,000 euros, and Tell Me Everything, a mental health themed drama series, would be two of the first ITV2 shows to debut on their new streaming service ITVX before getting terrestrial slots, which eventually came in April 2023 and June 2023 respectively.

In June 2022, ITV2 picked up a number of American drama series, primarily teen and family dramas from the late 1990s and 2000s, for daytimes, including re-runs of One Tree Hill, Hart of Dixie and The O.C. as well as the sports drama All American, which had replaced Bob's Burgers in its 7 pm timeslot. Subsequently, ITV2 has also picked up Dawson's Creek, Veronica Mars and Chuck. Later additions have included Charmed and Gilmore Girls.

All American was unsuccessful in its 7 pm slot and so after a month of consistently low ratings, it was moved to around 2 am each morning, with Bob's Burgers returning on 4 July 2022. Despite this incident, in January 2023, ITV2 would later stop airing Bob's Burgers altogether and replace it with Superstore, a programme which ITV2 used to air until September 2022 when it was replaced by Secret Crush. After another three months of low ratings, this decision was eventually reversed, and Bob's Burgers returned to ITV2 for a second time in April 2023.

In August 2022, the channel axed its Katherine Ryan–presented dating show Ready To Mingle after some episodes in the first series received ratings as low as 60,000 viewers, and picked up the rights to the Big Brother format, launching a teaser trailer for its return to British TV during the Love Island final.

On 19 September 2022, ITV2 and other ITV digital channels simulcast ITV's coverage of the funeral of Queen Elizabeth II at Westminster Abbey.

On 8 October 2023, Big Brother made its debut on ITV, with a special launch show simulcast on both ITV1 & ITV2 watched by more than 2.5 million viewers.

On 16 April 2025, it was announced that sister channel ITVBe would close and its programmes would move to ITV2, including The Only Way is Essex which aired on ITV2 prior to 2014. Animated and live-action comedies such as Family Guy and G'wed would be retained on the ITV2 schedule. ITVBe's channel slots would be used to launch a new game show–centric channel named ITV Quiz.

== Most watched programmes ==
The following is a list of the six most watched shows on ITV2, based on Live +28 data supplied by BARB up to 10 January 2019.

Rank	Show	Episode	Viewers (millions)	Date
1	Love Island	5.01	5.90	3 June 2019
2	Love Island	5.03	5.74	5 June 2019
3	Love Island	5.05	5.69	7 June 2019
4	Love Island	5.02	5.60	4 June 2019
5	Love Island	5.04	5.55	6 June 2019
6	Love Island	5.06	5.44	9 June 2019

Before Love Island's successful return, the highest rated show on the channel was episode 7.01 of Celebrity Juice, starring Phillip Schofield, on 9 February 2012.

== Awards ==
ITV2 won Channel of the Year at the Broadcast Digital Awards in 2007 and again in 2013. It was also named Non-Terrestrial Channel of the Year at the Edinburgh International Television Festival in 2007.

== Criticisms ==
In a 2009 episode of Screenwipe, Black Mirror creator Charlie Brooker criticised the channel's programming as being "nihilistic worthlessness" and called it "a monument to cultural death" and "frighteningly meaningless."

In 2014, the channel was subject to a controversy about one of its shows. Dapper Laughs: On the Pull was created by Vine comedian Daniel "Dapper Laughs" O'Reilly. The show was criticised for promoting violence against women and dubbed by one paper as "a rapist's almanac". Due to these criticisms, an online petition for the show's cancellation reaching 68,210 signatures and a sexist joke glorifying rape said by O'Reilly during one of his live shows, ITV chose not to commission a second series. A subsequent live tour was also cancelled. In the wake of the scandal, Stewart Lee criticised O'Reilly's Newsnight apology and said "what kind of person gets banned from ITV2? That's like being banned from a pub that's on fire."

In October 2024, in the midst of the Gaza war, an episode of the series Big Brother was edited by the channel to remove all images of a watermelon symbol, which has been used as a symbol of Palestinian solidarity, that appeared on the shirt of contestant Ali Bromley. Writing for The Intercept, Nikita Mazurov compared the action to George Orwell's novel Nineteen Eighty-Four, from which the series Big Brother takes its name, arguing that the editing of the episode represented a "key tenant of the novel: old media being edited and original versions destroyed, leaving no trace of any modification having taken place."

== Subsidiary channels ==
=== ITV2 +1 ===
Third +1 logo used since 15 November 2022

The timeshift channel ITV2 +1 launched 30 October 2006, along with its sister channel, ITV3 +1. It was allocated channel number 211 on Sky. On 6 May 2008 it was announced that ITV2 +1 would swap with Men & Motors on the Sky EPG making a jump from 184 to 131. This channel is often unable to broadcast certain programmes "for legal reasons", but the programme in question might still be listed on the EPG. ITV2 +1 currently resides on Sky channel 218, and is also available on Freeview channel 29 Freesat channel 114 and Virgin TV channel 315.

=== ITV2 HD ===
Third HD logo used since 15 November 2022

ITV2 HD, a high-definition simulcast of ITV2, launched on 7 October 2010 on Sky channel 225. The channel was initially available through Sky's pay subscription service in a non-exclusive deal, before being added to Virgin Media's service on 14 March 2013. Original HD programming includes entertainment shows, Britain's Got More Talent, The Xtra Factor and I'm a Celebrity: Extra Camp; original drama such as the third and fourth series of Secret Diary of a Call Girl; and acquired content including The Vampire Diaries and Gossip Girl and a range of movies.

On 1 November 2022, in the lead up to the launch of ITVX, the encryption was dropped on ITV2 HD at around 11am that day and so became free to air. Later that day, Freesat data had been added to ITV2 HD, indicating that the channel will be made available on Freesat soon. On 8 November 2022 the HD version replaced the SD version on Freesat channel 113.

== Former local variants ==
=== S2 ===
S2 was a television station broadcast throughout the Scottish and Grampian ITV regions by SMG plc, the holder of the Scottish and Grampian region ITV franchises. S2, which aired on the digital terrestrial platform, was launched 30 April 1999 and closed just over two years later – as part of a deal with ITV Digital – on 27 July 2001.

By the end of its life, it had lost nearly all of its Scottish programmes and mainly simulcast ITV2, but covered the ITV2 graphic with an opaque S2 graphic.

=== UTV2 ===
UTV2 was a television station broadcast by Ulster Television on Digital Terrestrial Television in Northern Ireland. It was launched in 1999 as TV You. The programming consisted primarily of simulcasts with the ITV2 station shown in England, Wales and the Scottish Borders, although they did also use archive broadcasts from UTV. UTV2 closed on 22 January 2002 following a deal with ITV Digital and was replaced by the national variant.

== Branding ==
When the channel launched, the logo was very similar in style to the ITV logo at the time, accompanied by the slogan "a different view" (later "total entertainment" in 2000). The channel used its own logo until 19 November 2001, when it was replaced by one matching the ITV1 logo. Designed by English & Pockett and known as "2 entertain", this look had ten idents, often associated with leisure activities, such as a rollercoaster ride, a firework, a bowling alley and a swimming pool. Each ident had its own name appearing during the formup of the channel logo, for example, the firework ident said "2 thrill" and the swimming pool ident said "2 relax". This coincided with what brand manager Chris Arrowsmith called a "coming of age", by having a standalone identity, while having a logo similar to its sister channel. This also coincided with a launch on Sky Digital later in the year, in order to stand out from its competitors. As part of the rebrand of ITV1, a slight logo change was done on 28 October 2002.

On 14 July 2003, the channel unveiled a new logo, positioning itself as the "flipside" to ITV1, and changing its logo: the blocks where the ITV wordmark was were yellow and the 2 block became blue. Five sub-brands were created in order to make it easier for viewers to navigate its content. During Newcastle United's run in the 2004–05 UEFA Cup, the channel was rebranded as ITV Toon on matchdays, referring to the club's nickname the Toon. The channel's yellow and blue idents changed to black and white, to match the club's colours.

The channel received a complete overhaul along with the other ITV channels in 2006, giving the channel a new lime green logo. The channel also received six new idents which all had names beginning with "Too" to relate to the 2 in the channel's name. They were called; "Too Fast", "Too Hot", "Too Cold", "Too Expensive", "Too Glamorous" and "Too Loud". Each of the idents were made up of a mix of shades of green to match the channel's logo.

In 2008, the channel received another new look. The green logo was kept but made 3D.

In line with the corporate rebranding of ITV, ITV2 received a new look on 14 January 2013. The channel's slogan became "the home of infectious entertainment", and received a "hot red" version of the logo and red on-screen identity including new idents.

ITV2 presentation was given a refresh on 12 August 2015, with new branding, idents, the introduction of gif style bitesized promos, and a reboot of the channel's social feeds, spanning YouTube, Facebook, Twitter and Instagram along with the launch of new ITV2 channels on Snapchat and Tumblr. As part of the refresh, the logo kept its previous state but was changed colour from hot red to turquoise.

ITV2 was given another rebrand on 15 November 2022, with new branding and idents along with the launch of the streaming service ITVX. As part of the refresh, the logo is now coloured pink and uses idents that are cross-used across ITV1, ITV3, ITV4, and ITVBe with different views which reflect the channel's image and programming output.

=== Former logos ===
First logo, 19 November 2001 to 28 October 2002

Second logo, 14 July 2003 to 15 January 2006

Third logo, 16 January 2006 to 19 August 2008

Fourth logo, 20 August 2008 to 13 January 2013

Fifth logo,14 January 2013 to 11 August 2015

First HD logo, 14 January 2013 to 11 August 2015

First +1 logo, 14 January 2013 to 11 August 2015

Sixth logo, 12 August 2015 to 14 November 2022

Second HD logo, 12 August 2015 to 14 November 2022

Second +1 logo, 12 August 2015 to 14 November 2022

== Programming ==
The channel nowadays is known for American programming such as adult animations Family Guy, American Dad! and Bob's Burgers; repeats of recently aired episodes of soap operas and other entertainment programming from ITV such as Coronation Street, Emmerdale, and Catchphrase; original comedy such as Celebrity Juice and Plebs, and reality formats such as Big Brother and Love Island.
