= Radio Times =

British weekly listings magazine

- Cover of the 2023 Christmas Double Issue (dated 23 December 2023 – 5 January 2024), featuring Mog
- Categories: TV and radio listings magazine
- Frequency: Weekly
- Circulation: 497,852 (July–December 2020)
- First issue: 28 September 1923; 103 years ago
- Company: George Newnes Ltd (1923–1937); BBC Magazines (1937–2011); Immediate Media Company (since 2011)
- Country: United Kingdom
- Based in: London, England
- Language: British English; Scottish Gaelic (Scotland edition); Welsh (Wales edition)
- Website: www.radiotimes.com
- ISSN: 0033-8060
- OCLC: 952210169

Radio Times is a British weekly listings magazine devoted to television and radio programme schedules, with other features such as interviews, film reviews and lifestyle items. Founded in September 1923 by John Reith, then general manager of the British Broadcasting Company, it was the world's first broadcast listings magazine. In September 2023 it became the first broadcast listings magazine to reach and then pass its centenary.

It was published entirely in-house by BBC Magazines from 8 January 1937 until 16 August 2011, when the division was merged into Immediate Media Company. On 12 January 2017, Immediate Media was bought by the German media group Hubert Burda.

The magazine is published on Tuesdays and carries listings for the week from Saturday to Friday. Originally, listings ran from Sunday to Saturday: the changeover meant 8 October 1960 was listed twice, in successive issues. Since Christmas 1969, a 14-day double-duration issue has been published each December containing schedules for two weeks of programmes. Originally this covered Christmas Day and New Year's Day, but on some occasions those have each appeared in separate editions due to the two-week period ending just before the New Year.

== History and profile ==
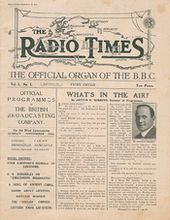
The first issue (28 September 1923)

The Radio Times was first issued on 28 September 1923 for the price of 2d, carrying details of programmes for six BBC wireless stations (2LO, 5IT, 2ZY, 5NO, 5WA and 5SC); newspapers at the time boycotted radio listings fearing that increased listenership might decrease their sales. It included a message to "listeners" by the BBC's chairman, Lord Gainford. Initially, The Radio Times was a combined enterprise between the British Broadcasting Company and publishers George Newnes Ltd; the latter typeset, printed and distributed the magazine. In 1925, the BBC assumed full editorial control, but printing and distribution could not begin in-house until 1937. The Radio Times established a reputation for using leading writers and illustrators, and the covers from the special editions are now collectable design classics. By 26 September 1926, the narrow columns of BBC's wireless programme schedules were broken up by the insertion of a photograph or two, relevant to or depicting subjects of the broadcasts. On 1 May 1927, The Radio Times produced an experimental Braille edition under the auspices of the National Institute for the Blind, and its success led to a regular weekly version publication costing one penny. From 15 January 1933, a weekly crossword puzzle made its first-ever appearance.

From 5 January 1934, the three-column programme pages were expanded to include a fourth column, with the BBC's television programmes given a new section layout on 8 January, and The Radio Times announced a regular series of "experimental television transmissions by the Baird process" for half an hour every night at 11 pm. The launch of the first regular 405-line television service by the BBC was reflected with television listings in The Radio Times's London edition of 23 October 1936. Thus, Radio Times became the first-ever television listings magazine in the world. Initially, only two pages in each edition were devoted to television, which ran from Monday to Saturday and remained off-air on Sundays until 3 April 1938.

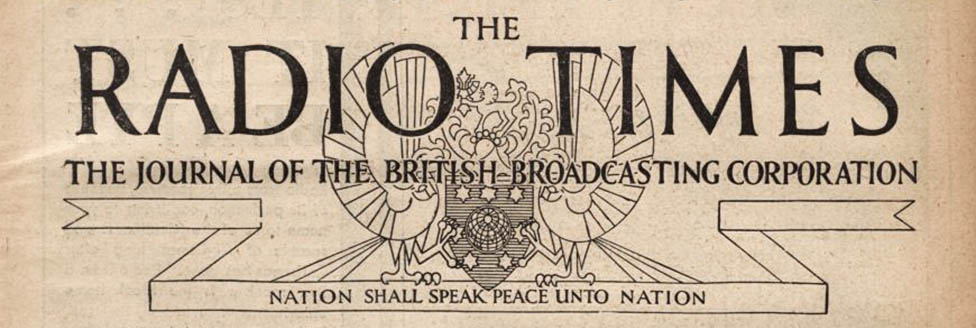
Masthead from the 25 December 1931 edition, including the BBC's coat of arms with the motto: "Nation shall speak peace unto nation"

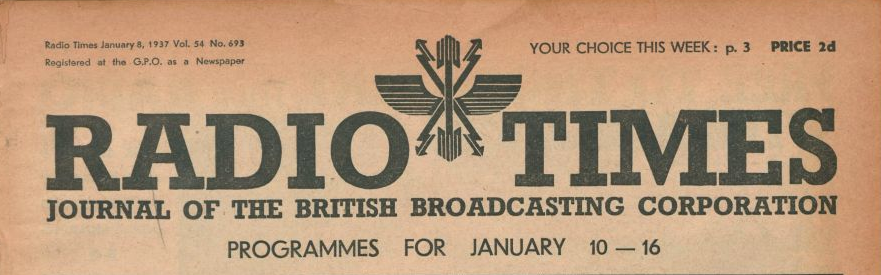
Masthead from the 8 January 1937 edition, the first using the title "Radio Times"

After 14 years, from issue 693 (cover date 8 January 1937), the definite article "The" was no longer used on the masthead or within the magazine, and the publication became simply known as Radio Times; a lavish photogravure supplement was also published in the same issue. Prior to the outbreak of World War II on 1 September 1939, the BBC radio listings provided a National Programme for the whole of the United Kingdom, and the Regional Programme appeared in seven different versions (London, Midlands, North, West, Wales, Northern Ireland and Scotland) each with a combination of various transmitters respectively before the two stations merged into a single service, and included three pages of television listings. When Britain declared war on Germany on 3 September 1939 and television broadcasting ceased, radio listings continued with a reduced service. From 23 June 1944, the Allied Expeditionary Forces edition carried details of all the programmes for the Home Service and General Forces Programme. The same year, paper rationing meant editions contained only 20 pages of tiny print on thin paper. Radio Times expanded with regional editions introduced from 29 July 1945, and television resumed again on 7 June 1946. On 4 March 1948, the weekend listing schedules for three BBC radio networks were doubled together with daytime and evening sections in an additional four pages a week; weekday billings also using the same layout added 12 extra pages of more articles and detailed programmes bringing the total number of pages up to 40 (or 44 for the television edition) on 1 July 1949.

From 18 January 1953, the television listing schedules, which had been in the back of the magazine, were placed alongside daily radio schedules. On 17 February 1957 (shortly after the abolition of the "Toddlers' Truce", during which transmissions terminated between 6 pm and 7 pm), television listings were moved to a separate section at the front with radio listings moved to the back; a day's listings were sometimes spread over up to three double-page spreads mixed with advertisements, but this format was phased out when independent publishers were allowed to publish television schedules. The new layout was structured as:

Station name	Successor
BBC Television Service^{[a]}; BBC Home Service (1 September 1939); BBC Light Programme (29 July 1945); BBC Third Programme (29 September 1946); BBC Network Three (30 September 1957)^{[b]}	BBC One • BBC Two (20 April 1964); BBC Radio 1 (30 September 1967); BBC Radio 2; BBC Radio 3 (with music, sports coverage and educational programmes)^{[b]}; BBC Radio 4 (includes regional news and opt-out programming)

From 8 October 1960, BBC television and radio schedules were re-integrated; the programmes included a new "pick of the week" with a single third page for previews, before each day's listings; these came before the two pages of television and the four pages of radio. A new bolder masthead was designed by Abram Games (who created graphical designs such as the "Festival Star" on the cover of the 1951 Festival of Britain and the 1953 "Bat's Wings" ident) containing the words "BBC TV and Sound" on the left side, and was introduced with this revamp; it became one of the shortest-used designs in the magazine's history. On 4 August 1962, when Radio Times was again revamped, the masthead was replaced with one incorporating the title in the Clarendon typeface; while the main change was the reduction of BBC radio schedules for three stations to a double-page spread brought down in size, the magazine now generally had between 60 and 68 pages, as compared to the relaunched format from two years earlier, which contained only 52 pages. From 30 September 1967, Radio Times introduced the all-new colour pages of the magazine's feature sections, including "star stories", Percy Thrower's gardening, Zena Skinner's cookery, Bill Hartley's motoring and Jeffery Boswall's birdwatching, as well as "Round and About" with up-to-the-minute stories in both television and radio from around the world. At the same time, the four new BBC radio stations (replacing the Home Service, the Light Programme and the Third Programme) were launched within the schedule listing pages. The layouts of programme page headings were restyled as well as the three radio pages, rearranged with schedule billings for Radio 1 and Radio 2 on the first, Radio 3 on the second and Radio 4 on the third. In future weeks, it would boast another revised masthead using the same typeface: simply a bold symbol "BBC TV" to the right of the title, with the price, date and regional edition being overprinted in letterpress at the top of the front page, and the letters section and the crossword placed inside the back page.

On 6 September 1969, Radio Times was given another radical makeover under a new editor, Geoffrey Cannon, with David Driver as art editor and Peter Gillman as features editor. Among other changes the date format was switched from "month-day-year" to "day-month-year" and the magazine ceased carrying cigarette advertisements after 46 years. The new format inside had the first three pages devoted to an abbreviated listing of all the week's BBC television and radio programmes in a simple condensed form; major changes were noticeable on the feature pages as colour was spread out to accompany them rather than solely on the centre page. The look of the magazine initially became far more restrained, with less white space between columns and headings. More significantly, the lifestyle section (which covered motoring, gardening and cookery) and the crossword were completely dropped, and the highlights section was scrapped. The front cover was surrounded by a black border and italicised its masthead (now in the Caslon typeface with swash capitals; this logo remained until April 2001), in an attempt to emphasise the "R" for radio and "T" for television. From 5 July 1975, the magazine was given a refreshed layout which consisted of horizontal black bars from top to bottom with the familiar darker-shaded look; by this time, the BBC's television schedules included a "colour" annotation that was dropped eight years later; programmes in black and white were never indicated, with the exception of feature films originally made for the cinema. Another major change occurred on 18 November 1978, in response to wavelength changes which took place on 23 November, that enabled Scotland, Wales and Northern Ireland to receive their own separate domestic services in addition to Radio 4 (also known as the national "Radio 4 UK" service, which remained until 29 September 1984); the arrival of these services on the pages forced all BBC radio stations into a six-column grid. On 30 August 1980, Radio Times developed a new double-page spread of Robert Ottaway's highlights for the week ahead, often used for both BBC radio and television programmes. The regular inside back page section for younger listeners and viewers featured content from Newsround presenter John Craven and a selection of new puzzles created by the television producer Clive Doig, such as the trackword (which consisted of nine squares in one word), as well as backstage stories and a comic strip of Peter Lord's Morph at the bottom of the page.

Between March and December 1983, Radio Times had severe industrial disputes when the British Printing & Communications Corporation and the union SOGAT 82 joined forces, and production was affected due to printing problems:

- 23 March: The BBC regretted that the printers for next week's edition were in short supply, but copies would be available in the South West, the West of England, North East, and many parts of South and the North of England.
- 7 April: The BBC expected copies of the magazine to be available in Scotland, Northern Ireland and North of England from 16 April, following the print workers in East Kilbride and near Bristol returning to work.
- 4 June: The general election special issue with the combined England edition, as well as the three constituent nations (Scotland, Wales and Northern Ireland) throughout the country was used for one week only.
- 16 July: The magazine was finally returned to the fully-regionalised form with complete details of all BBC television channels and radio stations for national, regional and local.
- 10 December: The magazine was printed and published as the single national edition once again, due to a print workers' strike from the previous week.

On 23 June 1984, the radio listings were redesigned again to improve their legibility and paving the way for a new printing technology. That same year, from 1 September, web-offset printing was used for the first time, meaning the magazine became brighter and more colourful. Newsprint and sheets of gravure gave way to black ink and white paper, Helvetica replaced Franklin Gothic for a larger character style, and the television listings were also redesigned including the new film icon^{[c]} and the "today at a glance" sidebar on the far right of pages were added. Starting from 11 October 1986, the new family viewing policy warned BBC Television was not allowed to broadcast programmes before 9 pm which it believed to be unsuitable for children. On 5 September 1987, Radio Times introduced an innovative title called "Upfront This Week" devoting the first three pages of illustrated snippets to provide the latest programme highlights from all BBC television and radio networks. On 19 November 1988, Radio Times launched a new weekly back page section called "My Kind of Day", which was devoted to the latest star interviews with various special guests. On 25 March 1989 (during Easter), a general overhaul of page layout and design took place, with a major makeover for the programme schedules and the channel headings being visible in greater clarity; BBC One and BBC Two were once again separated, with the return of the late 1950s/early 1960s layout – television at the front and radio at the back. The week's Radio 1 schedules occupied a single page, followed by Radio 2 (with a facing pair of pages), then several pages of Radio 3 (five pages) and Radio 4 (six pages), and finally the BBC Local Radio listings; regional features, which had been absent from the English editions since the late 1960s, resumed with a localised page. On 25 November of that year, the radio schedules were restored to two pages for each day; some of the English editions now also had daily editorial features on radio.

From 2 June 1990, the entire magazine was published in colour for the first time, and another layout began to be used: the day's listings began with a single page of highlights which included "at a glance", followed by the double-page spreads of BBC television channels (BBC One always occupied the left page and BBC Two for the right page, without advertisements interrupting the listings) and BBC radio stations, now enlivened with colour logos at the top of the pages.^{[d]} This layout only lasted for six months, when a new refreshed format debuted in the 22 December Christmas edition; while the programme listing pages were largely the same, the colour-coded days of the week were now at the top of the page headings.^{[e]} On 16 February 1991 (the same date as the new idents of BBC One and BBC Two), the deregulation of television listings began, and Radio Times started to cover all services that included ITV, Channel 4 and satellite networks, an alphabetical list of the commercial radio stations available with the frequency and a two or three-word summary of that station's output which was added to the local radio page. Full complete listings of the four main channels and satellite began on Friday 1 March.

Prior to deregulation, the five weekly listings magazines were as follows:

- Radio Times carried the programme schedule listings for BBC radio and television channels, including the new Radio 5 launched on 27 August 1990.^{[f]}
- The ITV-published magazine TV Times,^{[g]} launched on 22 September 1955, carried programme listings for ITV, and Channel 4 from 2 November 1982. The regional ITV companies produced their own listings magazines – Look Westward (WTV), The Viewer (Tyne Tees), TV Guide (STV), TV Post (Ulster), Television Weekly (TWW/ITSWW/Harlech), Wales TV/Teledu Cymru (WWN) and TV World (ATV/ABC)^{[h]} – were published before TV Times went national on 21 September 1968.
- Sbec, a pull-out weekly listings supplement (first published on 1 November 1982) which is distributed free with the Wales edition of TV Times, containing the full details of S4C's schedules in both Welsh and English, as well as Channel 4's programmes were also included.
- Rupert Murdoch's new publication TV Guide launches on 19 March 1989,^{[i]} carried the 28 pages of Astra satellite (1A) television listings for various Sky channels (including Sky One, Sky News, Sky Movies, Eurosport, and from 15 December 1990, Sky Arts, Movie Channel,^{[j]} Power Station^{[k]} and Sports Channel^{[l]} were added after the BSB merger on the Marcopolo system), MTV, RTL Véronique (for English programmes), Screensport, Children's Channel, Lifestyle with a highlights of BBC, ITV and Channel 4 listings.
- In the Republic of Ireland, Raidió Teilifís Éireann published the RTÉ Guide (formerly the RTV Guide) launched on 1 December 1961, it offered detailed programme listings for RTÉ's television and radio channels. From 8 January 1977, they switched from tabloid format to a compact A4-sized magazine and also changes from monochrome into colour, while listings were carried for Radio Luxembourg, AFN and BBC Northern Ireland were later dropped on 8 July 1966, but only the RTÉ programme schedules up until 13 April 1991.

Today, both publications carry listings for all major terrestrial, cable and satellite television channels in the United Kingdom and following deregulation, new listings magazines such as Mirror Group's TV First, IPC Media's What's on TV, Bauer Media Group's TV Quick and Hamfield Publications' TV Plus^{[m]} began to be published; several newspapers were also allowed to print television schedules for the entire forthcoming week on a Saturday (or a Sunday), where previously they had only been able to list each day's programmes in that edition.

With another major refresh on 31 August 1991, the four extra pages of satellite television listings and one page of the highlights section were scrapped and replaced by ten satellite networks (with two more, Comedy Channel and CNN International, added) from top to bottom; the daytime schedules for BBC One and BBC Two flanked the satellite listings on the left, with ITV, Channel 4 and "at a glance" on the right; the main evening schedules for terrestrial television channels retained the same layout. On 5 September 1992, the daytime listings were slightly tweaked, ITV's programme schedules were now sandwiched between BBC Two and Channel 4 within the centre pages, and there were now two pages of satellite and cable channels for each category making up six pages of television listings every day:

Category section	Channels
Movies	Sky Movies (also known as Sky Movies Plus until 11 September 1993); Movie Channel^{[j]}; Sky Movies Gold (from 1 October 1992)
Sport	Sky Sports; Eurosport; Screensport^{[n]}
News	Sky News; CNN International
Entertainment (unused until 11 September 1993)	Sky One; Comedy Channel (until 30 September 1992); UK Gold (from 1 November 1992); Lifestyle (until 24 January 1993); Children's Channel; MTV Europe; TV Asia; Adult Channel (unsuitabled until 19 December 1992)
Cable	Bravo; Discovery; Learning Channel; Super Channel; AsiaVision; HVC (unsuitabled until 19 December 1992)

Several layouts were altered during 1993:

- 1 January: The VideoPlus+ number codes to cover all the terrestrial and satellite television channels were added for the first time, which allowed viewers with suitably equipped video recorders to enter the programme's number and ensure its timer was set to tapeg it.
- 2 January: The new "film premiere" icon appeared for terrestrial television listings, replacing the phrase "first showing on network television".
- 30 April: The second national commercial station Virgin 1215 was launched and appeared in the local radio listings page.
- 5 June: The radio schedules were given a radical makeover, with highlights on the right including day-by-day Virgin 1215, Classic FM and BBC World Service added to each page; the local radio listings incorporated the weekly frequency guide, and the television schedule pages saw the introduction of the year of production shown in brackets for film titles.
- 19 June: The categories for satellite television listings were completely rearranged, with the news section includes Sky One moving to the left and the sport section moving to the right, with BSkyB's film classifications added at the bottom corner on the left page.
- 24 July: Two former cable-only services (Bravo and Discovery) appeared in the entertainment section following their launch on satellite, and the cable television listings were relegated to the bottom, meaning the sport section was no longer used.
- 1 September: With the introduction of Sky Multichannels package on the new Astra 1C system, three new services (UK Living, Family Channel and Nickelodeon) launched, as well as CMT Europe; all were added to the previously unused entertainment category within the sport section (sandwiched between movies and news on the left) and Sky One's schedules moved back to the right page.
- 11 September: The satellite television listings were given a redesigned layout, starting with the new movie planner section, providing the latest film titles in alphabetical order on various channels at different times every day; other changes included the new factual section (including Discovery, Sky News and CNN International) that replaced the news category, and the sport section moved back to the right page again.
- 18 September: The British versions of TNT and Cartoon Network were added to the movie planner and entertainment sections respectively.
- 25 September: The daytime listings were changed again, with "at a glance" now on the right page and advertisements occupying the left page. The channel heading logos were reduced into smaller horizontal bars on columns adjacent to those used for terrestrial television listings, a new children's television section (with Children's Channel, Nickelodeon and Cartoon Network) was added, and the cable listings including Super Channel were moved to the left side next to the movie planner section (with AsiaVision, Wire TV and Learning Channel being removed).
- 1 October: The British version of QVC launches, appearing at the bottom corner in the entertainment section.

Radio Times's design was refreshed on 3 September 1994: the television listings had the day's name written vertically, beginning with the daytime section including "today's choices" (which replaced "at a glance" on the left page), followed by the main evening's schedules in an original four-column grid, as well as the highlights section (now occupying the far left page within the satellite listings), and the movie planner was now on the right page. On 22 March 1997, the programme pages in the television section were restyled, often including smaller headings and more billing type with several changes in this layout between the narrower columns for Channel 5 schedules (which launched on 30 March) on the right and regional variations on the left page. Another major revamp took place on 25 September 1999, where all the pages now proceeded in the order: the letters section, followed by film reviews, then the seven-day programme guide with six pages for television (including satellite) and two pages for radio, as well as the single-page crossword and local radio listings with frequencies, and finally the "My Kind of Day" for the back page which was preceded by classified advertisements. The programme page headings were returned to being inside a coloured block,^{[o]} and the primetime television listings went from two narrow columns to one wide column. The warning phrase "contains strong language", used for BBC television programmes from 9 pm during the hours of watershed broadcasting restrictions was also implemented at this time, lasting until 2009. This layout lasted until shortly before Easter on 13 April 2001, which saw the new masthead title with the BBC's corporate typeface Gill Sans (used until the end of 2004, being replaced by Interstate at the start of 2005), while the programme pages with eight pages of television listings reverted to having the day running across the top of the page horizontally, and the satellite listings expanded into four pages, while the double-page movie planner section for 18 different film channels was retained.

On 26 November 2002, NTL and BBC Worldwide announced a major new agreement that would offer an exclusive, tailored edition of Radio Times to every NTL customer across the United Kingdom every week, to be delivered directly to subscribers' homes. The special NTL edition of Radio Times replaced the monthly Cable Guide magazine, which had been published from September 1986 to December 2002. It contained programme information for channels carried by NTL, including all terrestrial services. Front Row's pay-per-view movies and events were also included. Subscribers were offered the first four weekly issues of the new title for the same price as the existing monthly magazine, delivered free to homes in time for the first programme week of 4 January 2003; both companies actively and jointly marketed the new edition.

From 30 October 2004, the programme schedule pages were revamped again, with the regional variations now at the bottom of the daytime section, as well as the same spread on the five main channels; BBC Three, BBC Four, ITV2, ITV3 (launched on 1 November) and More4 (from 10 October 2005) now appeared in digital/cable section on the right page, with a children's section in a single page on the left. The category sections for digital, satellite and cable listings also returned after a four-year absence:

Category section	Digital, satellite and cable channels
Entertainment	E4 (until 8 October 2005 has moved at the evening listings section before the launch of More4); Sky One; Sky Two (formerly known as Sky Mix); Sky Three (from 31 October 2005); Living TV; Living TV 2; ITV4 (from 1 November 2005); UKTV Gold; UKTV G2; ABC1; Paramount Comedy; Paramount 2; Ftn; Sci-Fi Channel; Hallmark; Bravo; UKTV Drama; Five Life (from 15 October 2006); Five US (from 16 October 2006)
Lifestyle	UKTV Style; UKTV Bright Ideas; Sky Travel (until 13 October 2006); Discovery Real Time (formerly known as Discovery Home & Leisure until 7 May 2005); UKTV Food
Factual	Discovery; National Geographic; UKTV History; UKTV Documentary; Animal Planet; History Channel; Performance; Biography Channel; Artsworld; BBC Parliament (from 5 February 2005)
Sport	British Eurosport; Sky Sports (includes four services); PremPlus (until 6 May 2007)
Films	Sky Movies/Sky Cinema (until 4 April 2007 as the channel becomes categorised for each different genre); FilmFour (until 19 July 2006 as a subscription service when the channel became free-to-air on 23 July); FilmFour Weekly (until 19 July 2006); Turner Classic Movies
Kids' TV	Nick Jr.; CBeebies; CBBC; Disney Channel; CITV (from 11 March 2006)^{[p]}

On 22 May 2007, two extra pages of television listings per day were added as part of a slight tweak in the publication's format, bringing it up to ten pages of listings per day in total, or five double-page spreads: one page of highlights with daytime listings and regional variations, followed by two pages of evening's terrestrial television listings (with "at a glance" for nine digital channels until 2010), then six pages of listings for digital, satellite and cable channels. Digital radio listings were integrated into the main radio pages, and three new pages of sport, lifestyle and music were added. By 11 April 2009, the digital, satellite and cable schedules were reshuffled (alongside entertainment, factual and children's sections) preceded by "today's choices" on the left side, and the sport section moved to the right side as well as the films section starting on the left within the centre pages horizontally. 10 April 2010 saw major changes as Radio Times went through an overhaul, with two pages of the latest reviews and highlights ("choices") somewhat akin to the TV Times, while the daytime listings moved to the evening section having the full day's output for the five main channels on one double-page spread; other changes saw listings start at 5 pm rather than 6.30 pm (sometimes earlier than 5 pm for weekends, bank holidays, Easter, Christmas and New Year), the addition of electronic program guide numbers into the channel headers, and the inclusion of director and year of production details for films throughout the day. For the London 2012 Olympics, the listings for three terrestrial channels (BBC Two, ITV and Channel 4) temporarily moved onto the right page and Channel 5 was moved to the next page on the left, to provide enough space for BBC One and BBC Three/BBC Four as the Olympic broadcasters, which also reminded viewers to use both the red button and online for BBC channels with additional broadcasts.

Following the closure of the BBC Three channel on 20 February 2016, Radio Times started to include BBC Four in the main channels section, with Channel 5 being relegated to the Freeview section. On 24 March 2020, to coincide with the launch of Disney+, Radio Times introduced two new sections for podcasts and six pages devoted to streaming and various catch-up services. On 8 September that same year, the Freeview channel listings were rearranged with Sky Arts moved to the second page, also the three columns in the satellite and cable pages were on the left side with the children's television section, and the six film services were also included. During the Tokyo Olympics (which was delayed due to global COVID-19 pandemic), on 20 July 2021 Radio Times declared its special bumper issue with 212 pages that included 16-day listings of the BBC's coverage and a comprehensive easy-to-use guide preceded by two pages with "pick of the action" chosen by various pundits, although this layout becoming slightly different since listings started on the left page with two columns for BBC One as a dedicated Olympic broadcaster (including BBC Red Button at the bottom) and BBC Two in the single column, as well as ITV, Channel 4 and BBC Four schedules placed on the right page. From 25 January 2022, the Freeview schedules were altered again starting with the return of BBC Three (launched on 1 February after six years since the television channel moved online), with ITV2's listings occupying at the bottom, and the seven remaining services placed in the second and third pages respectively.

From 4 October 2022 (three weeks before the BBC's 100th anniversary celebrations), Radio Times refreshed its format:

- The "this week" section which was devoted to the best entertainment reviews with all latest news over the next seven days, as well as other features including the grapevine, ten questions, viewpoint and "on the box" fronted by broadcaster Jane Garvey.
- The expanded pages of the streaming section provided the best of catch-up services for television and films (including free-to-view, subscription or premium).
- The double-page "highlights" section was given a newly refreshed layout dedicated to the most comprehensive guide of programmes throughout the week ahead with "also on today", "live sport" and "film of the day" also included.
- The third page of the Freeview section included some of its children's television schedules sandwiched between the top two channels. Food Network and Blaze were added as requested by readers and the number of movie channels was reduced from eighteen to eight within the centre pages, with the latest film reviews embedded into each day's listings occupying the right hand side.
- The last two pages of satellite/cable schedules followed by the sport section were incorporated into a "quick and easy" planner with various times by using individual live coverage of other events, as well as channel numbers (including Sky Sports, BT Sport, Eurosport and Premier Sports) listed in the bottom right corner. Three weeks later (18 October), the mainstream sport listings were reverted to any channel rather than popular events.

On 4 April 2023, the radio pages had a major refresh to provide listings by adding three services (Boom Radio, Greatest Hits Radio, and Times Radio), as well as a restyled podcasts section to improve pick of the best audio on demand.

On 3 February 2026, Radio Times underwent its first significant masthead refresh in more than 20 years, aiming to reposition itself for a rapidly changing media. The new design drew on the magazine's heyday between the 1970s and 1990s, reinterpreting the logo for a modern context balances with clarity and confidence. As from 31 March of that year, the programme pages for television and radio were tweaked, with 5's schedules placed on the main channels and BBC Four moved back to its Freeview section after a ten-year absence.

=== Circulation ===
In 1934, Radio Times achieved a circulation of two million and its net profit in that year was more than one quarter of the total BBC licence income. By the 1950s, Radio Times had grown to be the magazine with the largest circulation in Europe, with an average sale of 8.8 million in 1955. Following the 1969 relaunch, circulation dropped by about a quarter of a million; it would take several years to recover but the magazine remained ahead of its glossier lifestyle-led competitor, TV Times. In the mid-1970s, it was just over four million; but in 2013 it was just over one million.

Between January and June 1990, Radio Times had an audited circulation of 2.8 million and TV Times of 2.7 million in the year before the deregulation of television listings, as they both had exclusivity of the future BBC and other commercial broadcasters respectively.

During a major revamp in April 2010, Radio Times was the third-biggest-selling magazine in the United Kingdom. However, according to the Audit Bureau of Circulations, the magazine experienced about 2.2% year-on-year decrease to an average weekly sale of 1,648,000 in the second half of 2009. It averaged a circulation per issue of 497,852 between July and December 2020, versus 1,041,826 for TV Choice^{[q]} and 690,617 for What's on TV.

=== Advertising ===
Between April and November 1990, Radio Times included a four-page advertising feature featuring previews of British Satellite Broadcasting programmes for its five channels – Sports Channel, Movie Channel,^{[j]} Now, Galaxy and Power Station.^{[k]}

During the deregulation of television listings, there was strong criticism from other magazines that Radio Times was advertised on the BBC (as well as on commercial broadcasting channels), saying that it gave unfair advantage to a publication and includes the tagline: "If it's on, it's in". The case went to court, but the outcome was that, as the Radio Times had close connections with the BBC, it would be allowed to be advertised by the BBC; however, from 1992 until 2004, it had to depict a static picture of the cover, and show a clear disclaimer reading "Other television listings magazines are available", leading to the phrase entering common public usage for a time. By the early 2000s, advertisements for the publication had become sparse on the BBC. Radio Times has not been promoted on BBC television and radio channels since 2005, following complaints by rival publications that the promotions were unfair competition.

=== Disputes ===
For various reasons, printing disputes and other operational difficulties have led to Radio Times appearing in different formats to the standard, as well as some issues not being printed. These include:

Issue No.	Issue date	Reason
138	14 May 1926	Unpublished due to general strike
1221	21 February 1947	Unpublished due to fuel crisis
1221	28 February 1947	Unpublished due to fuel crisis
1342	1 July 1949	London edition printed by The Daily Graphic
1404	8 September 1950	Unpublished due to printing dispute
1404	15 September 1950	Nine-day issue, northern edition printed as a tabloid format
1408	13 October 1950	Unpublished due to printing dispute
1408	20 October 1950	Unpublished due to printing dispute
1408	27 October 1950	Unpublished due to printing dispute
1408	3 November 1950	Nine-day issue, northern edition printed as a tabloid format
1685	24 February 1956	Printed as a broadsheet format in Paris, France
1686	2 March 1956	Printed as a broadsheet format in Paris, France
1687	9 March 1956	Printed as a broadsheet format in Paris, France
1688	16 March 1956	Printed as a broadsheet format in Paris, France
1689	23 March 1956	Printed as a broadsheet format in Paris, France
1690	30 March 1956	Printed as a broadsheet format in Paris, France
2870	11 November 1978	Cover printed in monochrome
2871	18 November 1978	Cover printed in monochrome
2872	25 November 1978	Cover printed in monochrome
2951	31 May 1980	Cover printed in monochrome
3012	1 August 1981	Unpublished due to printing dispute
3099	2 April 1983	Unpublished due to printing dispute
3100	9 April 1983	Unpublished due to printing dispute
3134	3 December 1983	Unpublished due to printing dispute

=== Other publications ===
An annual was published three times: in 1954, 1955 and 1956.

The Radio Times Film & Video Guide by the magazine's film and video editor Derek Winnert was first published in 1994, featuring more than 18,000 films and an introduction by Barry Norman, former presenter of the BBC's Film programme. A second edition was published the following year. In 2000, a completely new Radio Times Guide to Films was published by BBC Worldwide, edited by Kilmey Fane-Saunders, featuring more than 21,000 film titles. The last edition of Radio Times Guide to Films was published in 2018. In September 2023, Radio Times publishes its own 180-page film guide dedicated to reviews and trivia for over 1,000 titles with five different star rating systems, and includes 250 favourites from the beginning of cinema to the present day.

There are also similar publications: the Radio Times Guide to TV Comedy by Mark Lewisohn, and the Radio Times Guide to Science-Fiction.

=== Website ===
The Radio Times website was launched in June 1997, primarily as a listings service. As from 18 August 2011, it relaunched and offers diverse editorial product to accompany its schedules for television, radio and film recommendations.

=== Puzzles ===
On 28 September 2020, Radio Times launched its online puzzle site using brainteasers from their archive. Puzzles include those based on television and radio programmes such as Eggheads, Only Connect, Pointless, Channel 4's Countdown and BBC Radio 2's PopMaster.

=== Podcast ===
On 8 September 2021, Radio Times introduced a 40-minute podcast show hosted by Jane Garvey and Rhianna Dhillon that includes interviews with television celebrities.

== Covers ==
When the magazine was a BBC publication, the covers had a BBC bias (in 2005, 31 of the 51 issues had BBC-related covers) and consisting of a single side of glossy paper; however the magazine often uses double or triple-width covers that open out for several large group photographs.

While recurring events (such as Remembrance Day, Crufts, the Oscars/BAFTAs, Eurovision Song Contest, Wimbledon Championships, Glastonbury Festival, the Proms and the Olympic Games) or new series programmes are marked by producing different covers, other covers are also sought by collectors:

- The first person of colour to feature on the front cover was the American singer Paul Robeson, in the 535th issue which dated on 29 December 1933.
- Following the invasion of Poland and Britain's declaration of war with Germany, Radio Times published a supplementary edition on 4 September 1939 (issue number 831A) with the cover showing the BBC's headquarters and the Union Jack flag within the words "Broadcasting carries on" underneath.
- Radio Times declared its special 'Coronation Number' issue on 31 May 1953 with a record-breaking 9,012,358 copies sold, as well as Eric Fraser's heraldic cover illustration. The back page depicted his lion and the unicorn tucking into an advertisement for Bachelors tinned foods. It was the first artwork cover since before World War II by the presses at Waterlow and Sons and could not be printed in full colour but the existing technology allowed a yellowish gold tint between the back and front within a red crown motif running across the magazine. Fraser was the revered illustrator who worked for the publication between 1926 and 1982, until his death on 15 November 1983 at the age of 81. A similar version to this majestic artwork cover was designed by Peter Horridge for the 2 May 2023 edition, preparing for the next coronation after more than 70 years. It included the updated official emblem of the royal cypher within a year in Roman numerals underneath.
- Radio Times celebrated the forthcoming Apollo 11 Moon landing on 10 July 1969, with the cover bearing the "TARGET MOON" caption at the top of the Saturn V rocket as it lifted off from Kennedy Space Center as part of NASA's Apollo mission.
- During BBC Television's 50th anniversary on 1 November 1986, Tony McSweeney's cover illustration depicted a 1930s family living in the shadow of Alexandra Palace somehow watching the opening titles of Nine O'Clock News on a modern colour set.
- 23 February 1991 saw Radio Times began to offer a comprehensive programme schedule guide to BBC, ITV, Channel 4 and various satellite networks (from Friday 1 March) bearing the "If it's on, it's in" tagline, which includes Arnold Schwarzenegger on the cover focusing on the Austrian bodybuilding champion. The deregulation of television listings had occurred, which allowed information on all channels to be printed.
- On 26 March 1994, to coincide with the relaunch of Radio 5 as 'Five Live' (the new rolling news and sport service which took place on 28 March) a group consisting of Nelson Mandela, Bill and Hillary Clinton, Boris Yeltsin, John Major and Benazir Bhutto appeared on the cover wearing t-shirts that include the logo designed by Sven Arnstein, as well as Jones Bloom's electronic retouching.
- A special issue for the 50th anniversary of BBC television news on 3 July 2004, as well as a fold-out cover with BBC news teams (Huw Edwards, Fiona Bruce, Anna Ford, George Alagiah, Sophie Raworth, Dermot Murnaghan, Natasha Kaplinsky, Sian Williams, Darren Jordon and Moira Stuart) was photographed by Andy Earl, and also an accompanying special pull-out supplement within the centre pages.
- On 10 February 2007, the second series of Life on Mars, was marked by the Radio Times producing a mock-up of a 1973-style cover promoting the series, placed on page three of the magazine.
- To mark the 90th anniversary of its publication, the Museum of London hosted an exhibition lasting several months in 2013, which showed various covers as part of the magazine's history.
- Radio Times reached its 5,000th edition on 9 May 2020 with lead articles from the support staff and workers of the National Health Service front line during the COVID-19 pandemic, and the cover also showing the colours of the rainbow using acrylic paint on a plain white background.
- Radio Times commemorated its centenary with an issue covering programmes between 23 and 29 September 2023. Four variant covers were produced: all shared the same "gold" graphic marking "100 Years" but featured four of the publication's most famous mastheads.

Each year, Radio Times celebrates those individuals and programmes that are featured at the Covers Party, where framed oversized versions of the covers are presented. Radio Times has had several sporting events with more than one of the Home Nations (such as the Six Nations, UEFA European Championship, Commonwealth Games, Rugby World Cup and the Premier League) taking part, often marked with different covers for each nation, showing their own team.

=== Doctor Who ===
Doctor Who is the most represented programme on the cover, appearing on 29 issues (with 35 separate covers due to multiples) since the programme began on 23 November 1963.

The Radio Times for 30 April – 6 May 2005 covered both the return of the Daleks to Doctor Who and the forthcoming general election.

On 30 April 2005, a double-width cover was used to commemorate the return of the Daleks to Doctor Who and the forthcoming general election. This cover recreated a scene from the 1964 serial The Dalek Invasion of Earth in which the Daleks were seen crossing Westminster Bridge with the Houses of Parliament and Big Ben in the background, and also the cover text read "VOTE DALEK!". On 29 September 2008, in a contest sponsored by the Periodical Publishers Association, this cover was voted the best British magazine cover of all time. Five years later (on 17 April 2010) before the next general election, three special covers depicting the Daleks invading the capital once more showing their colours of red, blue and yellow as one of several Britain's political parties for Labour, Conservative and Liberal Democrats were used individually.

Throughout the decades, Radio Times had covers for various television specials and anniversary editions:

- On 19 November 1983, the show celebrated its 20th anniversary with a standalone special featuring Tom Baker, Patrick Troughton, Peter Davison, Jon Pertwee, Richard Hurndall (who replaced William Hartnell, who died on 23 April 1975) and Anthony Ainley as The Master. They featured in an illustrated cover by Andrew Skilleter.
- On 20 November 1993, as the show marked its 30th anniversary, the surviving actors who had played The Doctor appeared to promote the special television event, a crossover between EastEnders as part of the BBC's annual Children in Need telethon. 3D glasses were sold in aid of the charity enhanced viewing of several programmes broadcast throughout the week, and the first Doctor Who episode to be aired since the series ended on 6 December 1989.
- Doctor Who returned to television on 25 May 1996 after a seven-year absence, as Paul McGann starred in a feature-length television special with a corresponding cover, and a 16-page pull-out supplement.
- A themed night on BBC Two on 13 November 1999, was marked by a specially commissioned Dalek portrait photographed by Lord Snowdon, which was originally used as a stamp design.
- For its 40th anniversary on 22 November 2003, a commemorative cover was photographed by Andy Earl to create a panoramic vista featuring Colin Baker, Sylvester McCoy, Tom Baker and Peter Davison, as well as the TARDIS, K-9, a Cyberman and the two Daleks.
- The 23 November 2013 issue marked the 50th anniversary of the programme with a selection of 12 different covers.

=== Christmas ===
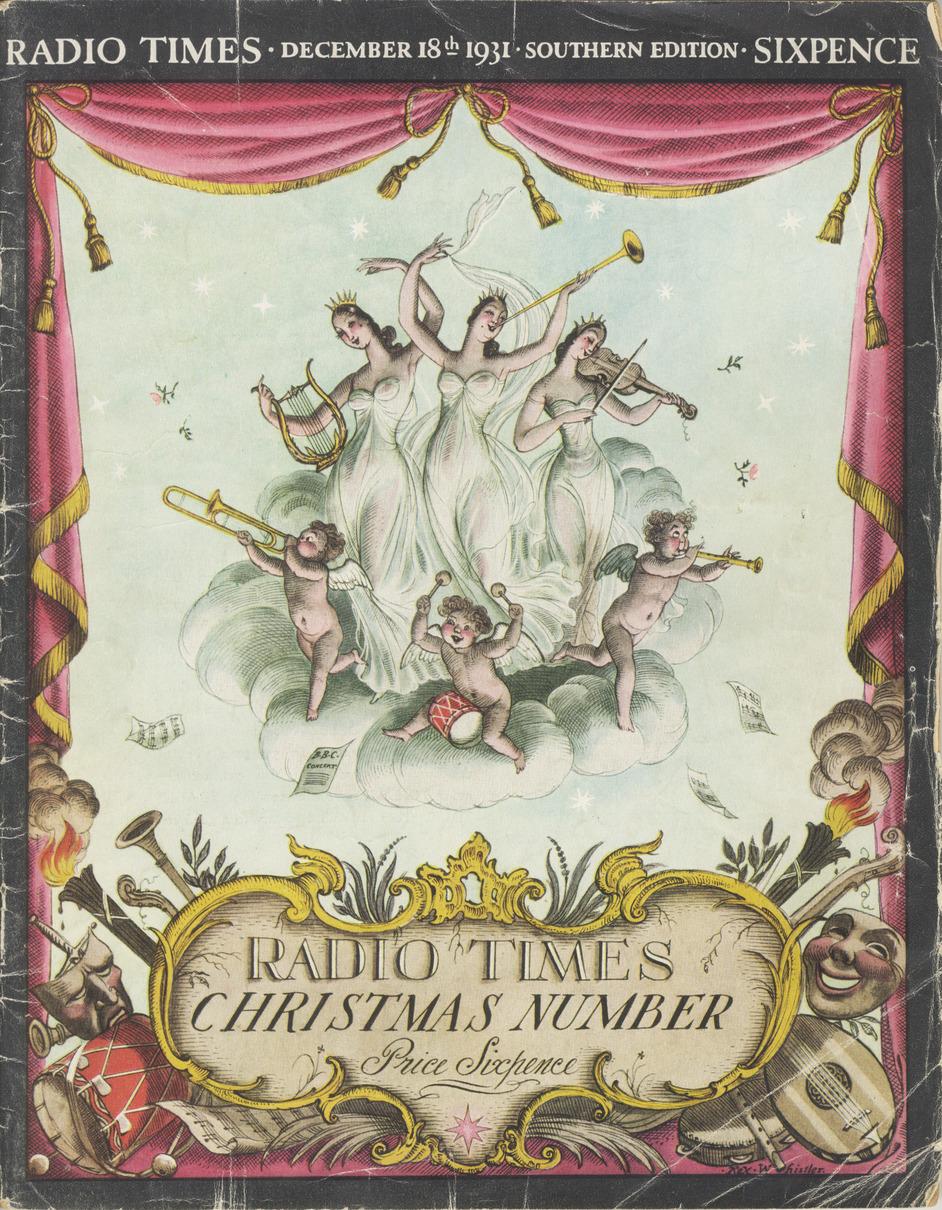
Christmas Number issue (18 December 1931)

The cover of the 'Christmas Number' (as this issue came to be called) dating from the time when it contained just a single week's listings, usually features a generic festive artwork, atypical for the magazine, which since the 1970s has almost exclusively used photographic covers. In recent years, Radio Times has published and sold packs of reproductions of some of these covers of the magazine as Christmas cards.

The 1988 Christmas double issue (dated 17–30 December) had a panto-themed cover illustration by Lynda Gray, with its popularity climaxing when the publication sold an astounding 11,220,666 copies, and the Guinness Book of Records certified it as the biggest-selling edition of any British magazine in history.

=== Royal specials ===
Over the years, Radio Times has published various special covers (often marked as a 'souvenir' issue) dedicated to royalty, often for occasions including royal birthdays, coronations, jubilees, royal weddings, state funerals and various celebrations across the decades.

Between February 1952 and September 2022, Radio Times dedicated multiple covers to Queen Elizabeth II:

- An informal picture of Prince Charles and Queen Elizabeth II, taken by photographer Joan Williams during the making of Richard Cawston's 110-minute documentary film Royal Family, was used for the cover of the issue on 21 June 1969.
- To celebrate Queen Elizabeth II's Silver Jubilee on 28 May 1977, Radio Times joined forces with BBC One's Blue Peter in running a competition for children to design a special cover, which led to a staggering 65,000 entrants. Winner Nicola Griffin was the youngest-ever cover artist; Newsround presenter John Craven reported on her painting of a jolly guardsman, as well as John Noakes going behind the scenes at the printers to watch the first of its three-and-a-half million copies come off the presses. The following week (4 June), the Radio Times took the unusual step of commissioning a tapestry made by Candace Bahouth for the artwork cover of this issue.
- Royal photographer Lord Snowdon was behind the camera for the cover with a double portrait of Queen Elizabeth II and Prince Philip to celebrate their 50th wedding anniversary on 15 November 1997.
- During Queen Elizabeth II's Diamond Jubilee on 2 June 2012, Radio Times celebrated this event with a majestic cover includes the new portrait painting designed by Peter Blake.
- Queen Elizabeth II officially opened the BBC's newly rebuilt Broadcasting House on 7 June 2013, and was presented with a collection of 44 majestic covers by the BBC Trust chairman Chris Patten.
- Ahead of the 90th birthday of Queen Elizabeth II, on 18 April 2016 a jubilant artwork cover was illustrated by Nina Cosford depicting the crowds gathered at Buckingham Palace. Two months later (11 June), Radio Times was deluged with cover designs from more than 11,000 children across the United Kingdom, including Ayesha Mahmood who became the winner of a competition after her design – showing its vibrant painting of a crown adorned within the purple-riched colour and gold glitter – was picked by a panel of judges that featured Blue Peter's Lindsey Russell, Shem Law, Judith Kerr and Ben Preston.
- As part of Queen Elizabeth II's Platinum Jubilee celebrations on 4 June 2022, illustrator James Weston Lewis took inspiration for his artwork cover from the King George VI's coronation special issue on 7 May 1937 which was designed by the famous war artist C. R. W. Nevinson, and captured some of its classic depiction of the original by adding a few modern elements.
- On 13 September 2022, Radio Times declared an emergency issue paying tribute to Queen Elizabeth II who died aged 96, including a monochrome photograph from the Camera Press with its darker sombre effect and surrounded by black border. A special commemorative edition was published on 20 September containing 30 pages showing her life and reign which reproduced nine majestic covers charting each decade, as well as the silhouette portrait used by permission and agreement of the Royal Mint.

== Regional editions ==
From the first edition of 2023, the regional editions in England were merged into a single edition which includes the times and titles of all of the BBC's local radio stations with any non-news regional variations contained in the listings. The stations carried were as follows:

Region	Television	Radio
England (includes Channel Islands)	BBC England (12 regions); ITV England (9 regions); ITV Channel Television	BBC Local Radio (40 stations)
Wales	BBC Wales; ITV Wales; S4C	BBC Radio Wales; BBC Radio Cymru (includes Radio Cymru 2)
Scotland/Border	BBC Scotland; BBC Alba; STV; ITV Border	BBC Radio Scotland (includes Shetland and Orkney); BBC Radio nan Gàidheal
Northern Ireland	BBC Northern Ireland; UTV; RTÉ One; RTÉ Two; Virgin Media One; Virgin Media Three	BBC Radio Ulster (includes Radio Foyle)

The number of regional editions has been altered over the years within gradually being reduced over time due to there being fewer variations in the programme schedules:

- The North of England region was separated from Northern Ireland on 4 January 1948 who had their own edition.
- The spread of television editions when full listings (with six pages) were not included in all issues between 7 June 1946 and 15 August 1952.
- On 8 October 1960, the Midlands region was renamed 'Midlands & East Anglia', and the West of England region was also renamed 'South & West'.
- On 9 February 1964, the launch of BBC Cymru Wales television service in the Welsh edition of Radio Times with its own programme schedule pages from the prominent heading (remained until 1982), without detracting from the service they provided to English viewers on the other side of the Severn Estuary.
- As from 21 March 1964, the previously unmarked London region was successfully renamed 'London & South East'. It was later dropped on 25 March 1989 when the 'London' name was no longer used, became known as 'South East', and later reverted to its original name on 23 February 1991.
- On 29 August 1970, the four English regional editions (along the constituent nations) were separated into ten areas, such as the administrative counties of Cumberland and Westmorland (which included the Furness exclave in Lancashire and the district of Sedbergh in the West Riding of Yorkshire) before the creation of a new non-metropolitan county of Cumbria from 1 April 1974 under the Local Government Act 1972 in England and Wales.
- Between 1 November 1982 and 22 February 1991, S4C listings were included in the Wales edition known as 'Rhaglenni Cymraeg' (Welsh programmes), while its English language programming were simply billed as 'Rhaglenni Saesneg' with no further detail being given. TV Times included a pull-out supplement Sbec which gave full details on all S4C programming in both languages. From the following week, it also took the billing space by cutting down on the detail in the Channel 4's listings in that edition, and allowing S4C to share some of its space.
- After the deregulation of television listings on 1 March 1991, they rebranded the Northern Ireland edition as 'Ulster' (named after the historic province), and started including listings for the Irish state broadcaster's two channels – RTÉ One and Network 2 – were occupied the lower half of the three columns devoted to UTV's schedules.
- Radio Times used to have three separate editions for STV, Grampian and Border (also appearing in the North East edition); after a while they merged back into one Scotland edition from 6 July 1991.
- The exception to this process of merging is Wales on 31 August 1991, which used to be part of a larger 'Wales/West' (of England), mirroring the HTV area. The region was separated on 16 April 2005 leaving the West of England to join South and South West edition. The two regional editions of London and East Anglia were merged on the same date.
- No publication of Radio Times in the Channel Islands as their listing schedules were contained within the South West region when it first appeared in the South edition on 30 March 1991. Channel TV published its own listings magazine, the CTV Times (formerly Channel Viewer) until 25 October of that year.
- All of four VHF opt-out services from Radio Scotland ceased broadcasting on 29 January 1993 and the output replaced by local news bulletins throughout each day on 1 February of that year.
- The Yorkshire region was absorbed by the North East region on 25 September 1993 became known as 'Yorkshire/Tyne Tees', and also later added the North West region on 7 April 2007.
- On 5 November 2001, BBC 2W launches as the digital-only service in Wales used for weekday evenings from 8.30pm to 10.00pm, within BBC Two's listings in the normal column is mainly split vertically in two to cover both the analogue and digital services. The digital-only service was ceased on 2 January 2009 as part of the digital switchover, and reverts to the normal service with less frequent regional programmes as the arrangement on analogue broadcasts.
- On 25 August 2007, the Midlands and London/Anglia regions were merged.
- On 24 February 2019, Radio Times introduces the BBC Scotland television channel, a new autonomous service that broadcasts an nightly line-up of entirely Scottish-related programming from 7.00pm to midnight replacing the Scotland's version of BBC Two after 53 years, and the listings were occupied by BBC Four at the bottom on the right page.

=== Radio ===
Since its began on 28 September 1923 (during the interwar period), there was just a single national edition to cover all the BBC wireless services including relay stations from 1924:

Station ID	City	First appearance
2LO	London	28 September 1923
2ZY	Manchester	28 September 1923
5IT	Birmingham	28 September 1923
5NO	Newcastle	28 September 1923
5WA	Cardiff	28 September 1923
5SC	Glasgow	28 September 1923
2BD	Aberdeen	10 October 1923
6BM	Bournemouth	17 October 1923
6FL (relay)	Sheffield	24 February 1924
5PY (relay)	Plymouth	28 March 1924
2EH (relay)	Edinburgh	1 May 1924
6LV (relay)	Liverpool	11 June 1924
2LS (relay)	Leeds/Bradford	8 July 1924
6KH (relay)	Hull	15 August 1924
2BE	Belfast	15 September 1924
5NG (relay)	Nottingham	16 September 1924
6ST (relay)	Stoke	21 October 1924
2DE (relay)	Dundee	12 November 1924
5SX (relay)	Swansea	12 December 1924
5XX (high-power)	Chelmsford (replaced by Daventry on 27 July 1925)	15 December 1924

From 10 October 1926, the two separate regions – 'Northern' and 'Southern' – were published before Radio Times reverted to one edition and covering all the local stations once again on 7 January 1934:

Region	Main station	Relay station
Northern	2BD; 2BE; 5NO; 5SC	2DE; 2EH
Southern	2LO; 2ZY; 5GB (experimental station from 21 August 1927); 5IT; 5WA; 5XX (high-power); 6BM	2LS; 5NG; 5PY; 5SX; 6FL; 6KH; 6LV; 6ST

Between 1930 and 1935, many of the original 21 BBC local stations eventually reduced to six regional services (including Wales from 1937) as well as five national variations with the exceptions of Plymouth, Bournemouth, Aberdeen and Stagshaw were remained until 1939 before the outbreak of World War II:

Region	Former BBC local station	Service date
Basic (London region until 5 July 1931)	London (national service from 12 October 1930); Daventry (high-power)	9 March 1930
Midland	Birmingham; Daventry (experimental); Nottingham; Stoke	9 March 1930
North	Hull; Leeds/Bradford; Liverpool; Manchester; Newcastle (replaced by Stagshaw service on 9 January 1938); Sheffield	17 May 1931 (regional); 5 July 1931 (national)
Scottish	Aberdeen (until 1 September 1939); Dundee; Edinburgh; Glasgow	13 September 1931 (regional); 7 October 1934 (national)
West (includes Welsh service until 31 January 1937)	Bournemouth (until 13 June 1939); Cardiff; Plymouth (until 13 June 1939); Swansea	16 May 1933 (regional); 13 August 1933 (national)
Northern Ireland	Belfast	6 January 1935

After the end of World War II in Europe, the seven local variations were resumed on 29 July 1945 which also used by BBC Home Service as they referred similar to its pre-war Regional Programme during the 1930s.

November 1967 saw the introduction of BBC Local Radio whether these regional areas subdivided with individual editions for each English county (except Isle of Man), as well as the national regions and several opt-out services were also used. This continued between February 1981 and January 1983 until each regional edition began to cover three local stations which was previously used by regional news and opt-out programming on Radio 4, apart from the South West (including the Channel Islands) as this was the only part of England still without any BBC local station. During the mid-1980s and early 1990s, a number of 13 new BBC local stations were added to covering the whole areas throughout the United Kingdom:

Region	BBC local station
London & South East	London (6 October 1970); Oxford (29 October 1970); Medway (18 December 1970 – renamed Radio Kent on 2 July 1983); Surrey (14 November 1991 – became Southern Counties Radio from 1 August 1994 and reverted back to its original name on 30 March 2009); Berkshire (21 February 1992 – became Thames Valley Radio on 9 April 1996 before the two stations were relaunched on 14 February 2000)
Midlands/East Anglia	Leicester (8 November 1967); Nottingham (31 January 1968); Stoke (14 March 1968); Birmingham (9 November 1970 – renamed Radio WM on 23 November 1981); Derby (29 April 1971); Norfolk (11 September 1980); Lincolnshire (11 November 1980); Cambridgeshire (1 May 1982); Northampton (16 June 1982); Shropshire (23 April 1985); Bedfordshire (24 June 1985 – renamed Three Counties Radio on 5 April 1993 which expands to cover the counties of Buckinghamshire and Hertfordshire); Essex (5 November 1986); Hereford & Worcester (14 February 1989); Coventry & Warwickshire (17 January 1990); Suffolk (12 April 1990)
South/West (includes Channel Islands)	Brighton (14 February 1968 – renamed Radio Sussex on 22 October 1983); Bristol (4 September 1970); Solent (31 December 1970); Jersey (15 March 1982); Guernsey (16 March 1982); Devon (17 January 1983); Cornwall (17 January 1983); Somerset Sound (11 April 1988 as a local opt-out service); Gloucestershire (3 October 1988); Wiltshire Sound (4 April 1989); Dorset (26 April 1993 as an opt-out service, but ceased transmission in March 1996 and replaced by a rebroadcast of Radio Solent with localised news bulletins)
Wales	Radio Cymru (3 January 1977); Radio Wales (13 November 1978); Radio Deeside (February 1980 as a local opt-out service – renamed Radio Clwyd in October 1981, and ceases transmission in October 1993); Radio Gwent (18 April 1983 as a local opt-out service, and ceases transmission in March 1991)
North	Sheffield (15 November 1967); Merseyside (22 November 1967); Leeds (24 June 1968); Durham (3 July 1968 – 25 August 1972); Manchester (10 September 1970); Teesside (31 December 1970 – renamed Radio Cleveland on 1 April 1974 following the formation of the new county); Newcastle (2 January 1971); Blackburn (26 January 1971 – renamed Radio Lancashire on 4 July 1981); Humberside (25 February 1971); Carlisle (24 November 1973 – renamed Radio Cumbria on 25 May 1982 and also Radio Furness as a local opt-out service); York (30 May 1982 as a temporary service, but later became full-time on 4 July 1983 for permanent basis)
Scotland	Radio Highland (22 March 1976 – 29 January 1993); Radio Aberdeen (19 April 1976 – 29 January 1993); Radio Orkney (9 May 1977 as local opt-out service); Shetland (9 May 1977 as local opt-out service); Radio Scotland (23 November 1978); Radio nan Eilean (5 October 1979 – 29 September 1985); Radio Tweed (11 April 1983 – 29 January 1993); Radio Solway (16 April 1983 – 29 January 1993); Radio nan Gàidheal (1 October 1985)
Northern Ireland	Radio Ulster (1 January 1975); Radio Foyle (11 September 1979 as a local opt-out service)

=== Television ===
In November 1936, Radio Times launched its first television listing service in the London area only before it closed down on 1 September 1939 for the duration of the war and finally resumed on 7 June 1946. When the second channel began in 1964, there were a number of areas where only certain parts of a region could receive this service until 1966:

BBC TV (later BBC One)	BBC Two
London (2 November 1936); Midlands (17 December 1949); North of England (12 October 1951); Scotland (14 March 1952); West of England (15 August 1952 – including Wales until 1964); Northern Ireland (1 May 1953); Wales (9 February 1964)	London & South East (20 April 1964); Midlands/East Anglia (6 December 1964 – became full service on 4 October 1965); Wales (12 September 1965); North of England (31 October 1965); South/West (16 January 1966); Northern Ireland (11 June 1966); Scotland (9 July 1966)

From 1 March 1991, Radio Times started carrying ITV and Channel 4 listings; to begin with they covered the 14 regional editions (which later reduced to ten areas) including several local television regions as well as the neighbouring countries outside Great Britain where available:

Region	BBC TV	ITV	Variations
London	BBC South East; BBC London (from 3 September 2001)	Thames (until 31 December 1992); Carlton (from 1 January 1993); LWT (used from Fridays to Sundays)	Anglia; Central; TVS/Meridian
East Anglia	BBC East	Anglia Television	Central; LWT (weekends); Thames/Carlton (weekdays); TVS/Meridian; Yorkshire
Midlands	BBC West Midlands; BBC East Midlands (from 7 January 1991)	Central Television	BBC Wales; Anglia; Granada; HTV (West/Wales); LWT (weekends); Thames/Carlton (weekdays); TVS/Meridian; Yorkshire
South	BBC South; BBC South East	TVS (until 31 December 1992); Meridian (from 1 January 1993); Channel TV (from 30 March 1991)	Anglia; Central; HTV (West); LWT (weekends); Thames/Carlton (weekdays); TSW/Westcountry
South West	BBC South West	TSW (until 31 December 1992); Westcountry (from 1 January 1993)	BBC Wales; HTV (West/Wales); TVS/Meridian
West/Wales (31 August 1991)	BBC West; BBC Wales	HTV	BBC England; Central; Granada; TSW/Westcountry; TVS/Meridian; S4C
North West	BBC North West	Granada Television	BBC Wales; Border; Central; HTV (Wales); Yorkshire; S4C
Yorkshire/North East (25 September 1993)	BBC North; BBC East Yorks & Lincs (from 11 November 2002); BBC North East & Cumbria	Yorkshire Television; Tyne Tees (also known as Channel 3 North East between 2 September 1996 and 9 March 1998)	BBC Scotland; Anglia; Border; Central; Granada
Scotland (6 July 1991)	BBC Scotland	STV; Grampian; Border	BBC England; BBC Northern Ireland (until 24 September 1993); Tyne Tees/C3NE; UTV (until 24 September 1993)
Northern Ireland	BBC Northern Ireland	UTV	BBC Wales; HTV (Wales); RTÉ One; Network 2; TV3 (from 20 September 1998)

Between April 2005 and August 2007, the regional editions were reduced from ten to six; they now cover every local station in the region consisting of 15 BBC regional services and 13 ITV companies:

Region	BBC TV	ITV	Variations
London/Anglia/Midlands (25 August 2007)	BBC London; BBC South East; BBC East; BBC West Midlands; BBC East Midlands	ITV London; ITV Anglia; ITV Central; ITV Thames Valley (4 December 2006 – 8 February 2009)	BBC1 Wales; BBC2 Wales/2W; ITV Meridian; ITV Wales; ITV West Country; London Live (from 31 March 2014)
South/West/South West (16 April 2005)	BBC South; BBC South East; BBC West; BBC South West	ITV Meridian; ITV West Country (formerly known as West and Westcountry regions until 13 February 2009); ITV Channel Television	BBC1 Wales; BBC2 Wales/2W; ITV Wales
Wales	BBC1 Wales; BBC2 Wales; BBC 2W (5 November 2001 – 2 January 2009)	ITV Wales	BBC1 England; BBC2 England; ITV Central/Thames Valley; ITV Meridian; ITV West Country; S4C
North West/Yorkshire/North East (7 April 2007)	BBC North West; BBC Yorkshire; BBC East Yorks & Lincs; BBC North East & Cumbria	ITV Granada; ITV Yorkshire; ITV Tyne Tees; ITV Border	BBC1 Scotland; BBC2/BBC Scotland; BBC1 Wales; BBC2 Wales/2W; ITV Anglia; ITV Central/Thames Valley; ITV Wales; S4C
Scotland/Border	BBC1 Scotland; BBC2 Scotland (until 23 February 2019); BBC Scotland (from 24 February 2019)	STV; Grampian (until 3 June 2006); ITV Border Scotland	BBC1 England; BBC2 England; ITV Tyne Tees; BBC Alba (from 19 September 2008)
Northern Ireland	BBC1 Northern Ireland; BBC2 Northern Ireland	UTV	BBC1 Wales; BBC2 Wales; ITV Wales; RTÉ One; RTÉ Two (also known as Network 2 until 2 October 2004); TV3

From 7 January 2023, regional editions in England ended. This saw every BBC Local Radio station included, along with London's local television channel London Live, which had always been included in the 'London/Anglia/Midlands' edition with Radio Times stating that it is a regional network and that other local services air on Freeview channels 7 and 8 in other parts of the country.

== Digitisation ==
In December 2012, the BBC completed a digitisation exercise, scanning the listings of all programmes from an entire run of about 4,500 copies of the magazine from 1923 (the first issue) to 2009, the BBC Genome Project, with a view to creating an online database of its output. They identified around five million programmes, involving 8.5 million actors, presenters, writers and technical staff.

The results were made public on 15 October 2014, Corrections to OCR errors and changes to advertised schedules are being crowdsourced. Digitised editions of entire magazines (including front covers, prose articles, advertisements and other non-listings content) were added:

- 1920s (March 2017)
- 1930s (December 2017)
- 1940s (December 2018)
- 1950s (December 2019)

Several addresses, telephone numbers and email addresses have been removed, to prevent readers from attempting to donate to charity appeals that have closed. Some names and trademark terms have been removed for legal reasons.

== Editors ==
There have been 20 editors of Radio Times to date (including one uncredited and one returning) since the magazine began publication:

- 1923–1926: Leonard Crocombe
- 1926–1927: Walter Fuller
- 1927–1933: Eric Maschwitz
- 1933–1941: Maurice Gorham
- 1941–1944: Gordon Stowell
- 1944–1954: Tom Henn
- 1954–1968: Douglas G. Williams
- 1968–1969: C. J. Campbell Nairne
- 1969–1979: Geoffrey Cannon
- 1979–1988: Brian Gearing
- 1988–1996: Nicholas Brett
- 1996–2000: Sue Robinson
- 2000–2001: Nicholas Brett (returned)
- 2001–April 2002: Nigel Horne
- April–July 2002: Liz Vercoe (uncredited)
- August 2002–August 2009: Gill Hudson
- September 2009 – 2017: Ben Preston
- 2017–2020: Mark Frith
- 2020–2024: Tom Loxley and Shem Law
- 2024–present: Shem Law

== See also ==
- Most Powerful People – an annual listing charted the three different areas of British media (include TV comedy, TV drama and radio) from January 2003 to June 2005
- Radio Times Extra – a digital programme guide which offers full television listings and synopses throughout 14 days provided by Inview Technology
- TV 100 – an annual listing featuring television talents since 2017
- Hörzu – a German weekly television and radio listings magazine
- New Zealand Listener – a weekly magazine that covers television and radio listings as well as political, culture and a variety of topics
- Radiocorriere TV – an Italian weekly listings magazine published by RAI
- Moustique – a Belgian weekly magazine with a special reference to current affairs, culture, television and radio
- Télérama – a French cultural magazine devoted to television, radio and film reviews
