= Sky Entertainment =

- Broadcast area: Sweden, Norway, Denmark, Finland

Ownership
- Owner: British Sky Broadcasting

History
- Launched: September 15, 1997
- Closed: February 14, 1999

Sky Entertainment was a television channel owned by British Sky Broadcasting which was broadcast to the Scandinavian countries, lasting about 18 months.

The channel was the result of an agreement between Telenor CTV and British Sky Broadcasting made in March 1997, which meant Telenor would be able to broadcast two channels produced by BSkyB to their subscribers in Scandinavia.

In September 2022, Sky re-entered the Scandinavian market with the introduction of SkyShowtime.

== History ==
=== Pre-launch ===
On December 13, 1995, British satellite TV provider British Sky Broadcasting and major ITV region franchisee Granada Television announced its new joint-venture entitled as Granada Sky Broadcasting, its channels will made use of Granada's programming library combined with Sky's assistance in technical, managing, marketing and financial situations, a total of eight new channels had been planned and to be launched on the Sky Multichannels pay-TV package.

=== Early years ===
Following the successful launch of the GSkyB channels in the British and Irish market, the Granada Television and British Sky Broadcasting's joint-venture wanted to expand into new markets, and they decided that Scandinavia should be the market that they were looking for. British TV programming in Sweden and other Scandinavian countries be likely to be popular and watched alongside American TV shows as well as their own native programming, the English language is a second language to many, or most Scandinavians. On March 10, 1997, Telenor announced 2 new channels from Sky that they will joining their CTV satellite service in autumn of that year, thus these channels included The Sky News & Documentaries Channel and The Sky Family Entertainment Channel, both of which were distributed via Telenor's Thor 1 satellite (at one degree west), The Sky Family Entertainment Channel (or shortened as Sky Entertainment) was originally going to be an GSkyB channel, while the Sky News & Documentaries Channel wholly owned by Sky. The Sky Family Entertainment Channel was originally intended to be an selection of content available from BSkyB's satellite TV service in the UK and Ireland, it might be most likely that Granada's channels were chosen as there will be no territorial broadcast rights issues.

On September 15, 1997, both Sky Entertainment, along with Sky News & Documentaries launched on Telenor's CTV satellite service in Scandinavia, it was the first time that a Sky-operated channel broadcast in Scandinavia since Sky's TV channel were encrypted (for paying customers in the British and Irish markets only) in September 1993, with only an exception to Sky News, which was free-to-air and can be received on Astra. Both channels was available up to 225,000 CTV subscribers, plus for cable subscribers.

Both Sky Entertainment and Sky News & Documentaries were in fact, combinations of channels, with Sky News & Documentaries consisted of Sky News airing from 02:00 to 18:00 CET, while The Computer Channel airing from 18:00 to 20:00 CET, and National Geographic Channel airing from 20:00 to 02:00 CET. Sky Entertainment also had three Granada channels and one, which were different from these Granada channels airing between the 24-hour day. In Sky Entertainment's case, the channels were:

Channel	Time (CET)
CMT Europe	02.00-10.00
Granada Good Life	10.00-19.00
Granada Plus	19.00-00.00
Granada Men & Motors	00.00-02.00

At the time during the launch, Sky Entertainment shared its analogue D2-MAC transponder on Intelsat 707 with Danish public service broadcaster DR2, meaning that CMT and Granada Good Life were the only channels broadcasting to analogue viewers, meanwhile, DR2 was broadcasting between 5 p.m. and 1 a.m., meaning the programmes of Granada Plus and/or Granada Men & Motors were not available to analogue viewers.

The channels were broadcast on the 1 degree west frequency as a part of the CTV package.

When CMT Europe closed down in 1998, it's airtime on Sky Entertainment was replaced by Video Zone.

On February 14, 1999, it was announced that Sky Entertainment would be ceasing transmissions at 1am CET, after just 18 months on-air. Bosses had a meeting in London on the channel's final days to decide the channel's fate and what would replace it; while an alternative Sky service was considered, this was never launched. However, Sky News and the National Geographic Channel continued to be broadcast in Scandinavia till this day, but as separate channels.
