= CTV (pay television) =

Defunct analog pay television package in Scandinavia

CTV logo.

CTV was an analogue pay television package, available in Scandinavia. It was mostly using Norwegian satellites such as Thor 1 and Intelsat 707 to broadcast basic channels to Scandinavian homes, using the D2-MAC transmission system. CTV was operated by Telenor, who in 1997 joined forces with Multichoice (owned by Canal+) to launch the Canal Digital platform. Most of the CTV channels were closed down in September 2001.

Channels carried on CTV included:

- CNN International
- MTV Nordic
- Discovery Channel/The Children's Channel
- Eurosport
- Sky News & Documentaries
- Sky Entertainment
- Cartoon Network/TNT
- BBC Prime
