= The Comedy Channel (British TV channel) =

Former British short-lived satellite television network (1991–1992)

- Country: United Kingdom

Ownership
- Owner: British Sky Broadcasting

History
- Launched: 1 October 1991
- Closed: 30 September 1992 (365 days)
- Replaced by: Sky Movies Gold

The Comedy Channel was a short-lived satellite television network owned by British Sky Broadcasting during the early 1990s.

== History ==
The channel launched on 1 October 1991, soon after the merger of Sky Television plc and British Satellite Broadcasting. The merged company called British Sky Broadcasting, brought together comedy programming from its existing libraries – Sky having an archive of American imports (including Three's Company, I Love Lucy, Green Acres, The Beverly Hillbillies and Seinfeld) and BSB having obtained rights to a number of BBC sitcoms such as 'Allo 'Allo!, Steptoe and Son, Are You Being Served?, Porridge, Dad's Army and The Goodies.

The Comedy Channel existed in the days before the basic Sky Multichannels subscription package, so was made available as a premium service to subscribers of either Sky Movies or The Movie Channel. Listings for the channel were carried in Radio Times and other listings magazines.

The network lost its broadcasting rights following the expiry of the contract between the BBC and former BSB. Eventually the channel closed on 30 September 1992 to be replaced by Sky Movies Gold, a service dedicated to "classic movies". Following the end of the contract with Sky, the BBC's archive programming was subsequently used to launch UK Gold on satellite and cable from 1 November 1992.

Sky would not relaunch a comedy-based channel until the arrival of Sky Comedy on 27 January 2020, it retains a minority interest in the domestic version of ViacomCBS's Comedy Central.

== Programming ==
=== American ===
- The Abbott and Costello Show
- The Addams Family
- Ann Jillian
- Babes
- Barney Miller
- The Beverly Hillbillies
- The Bob Newhart Show
- Car 54, Where Are You?
- Comic Strip Live
- Doctor Doctor
- F Troop
- Free Spirit
- Gilligan's Island
- Green Acres
- Here's Lucy
- Hogan's Heroes
- Homeroom
- The Honeymooners
- I Love Lucy
- In Living Color
- It's Garry Shandling's Show
- Leave It to Beaver
- The Love Boat
- The Lucy Show
- The Lucy–Desi Comedy Hour
- The Mary Tyler Moore Show
- McHale's Navy
- Mister Ed
- The Monkees
- Moonlighting
- The Munsters
- Night Court
- Petticoat Junction
- Rowan & Martin's Laugh-In
- Seinfeld
- The Sonny & Cher Comedy Hour
- The Sunday Comics
- Three's Company
- Wings
- Working It Out

=== Australian ===
- The Comedy Company
- Mother and Son

=== British ===
- 'Allo 'Allo!
- Are You Being Served?
- Dad's Army
- The Good Life
- The Goodies
- Oh, Brother!
- Porridge
- Steptoe and Son
- Till Death Us Do Part
- The Young Ones

=== Canadian ===
- The Kids in the Hall
- Maniac Mansion
