= Sky Multichannels =

Analogue satellite television package offered by BSkyB (1993–2001)

- Country: United Kingdom

Ownership
- Owner: British Sky Broadcasting

History
- Launched: 1 September 1993; 33 years ago
- Closed: 27 September 2001; 25 years ago

Sky Multichannels was a package of analogue television services offered by British Sky Broadcasting on the Astra satellites at 19.2° east from 1 September 1993 to 27 September 2001, which started off with 15 channels before expanding to over 40.

== History ==
=== Overview ===
The service started on 1 September 1993, based on the idea from chief executive officer Sam Chisholm and Rupert Murdoch of converting the company's business strategy to an entirely fee-based concept. The new package included four channels formerly available free-to-air on Astra's satellites, as well as introducing new channels. Some of the channels had been broadcast either in the clear or soft encrypted (i.e. a VideoCrypt decoder was required, but without a subscription card) prior to their addition to the Multichannels package.

Within two months of the launch, Sky gained 400,000 new subscribers with the majority taking at least one premium channel, which helped BSkyB reach 3.5 million households by mid-1994. The service continued until the closure of BSkyB's analogue platform on 27 September 2001, due to the expansion of Sky Digital after its launch three years earlier.

Channels which joined the package were paid a fee of 15 pence per subscriber per month.

Channels added later include QVC (1 October 1993) and VH1 (1 October 1994). When VH1's German version started on 10 March 1995, VideoCrypt decoders would blank out the service to British viewers and prevent them from watching the channel for free. Nick at Nite was originally going to be part of the Multichannels plan and was planning to be launched sometime in 1994, but the channel ultimately never launched. Sky Soap and Sky Travel launched, and were added to the package, on 3 October 1994, but Sky News remained free-to-air. QVC was switched to free-to-view broadcasting on 7 March 1995. 1996 saw the launch of Sky 2 and a selection of channels operated in conjunction with Granada.

The launch of Astra 1D allowed Sky to further expand the Multichannels package, including the pay-per-view Box Office channels on 1 December 1997.

A European Multichannels package run by BSkyB – also using the VideoCrypt encryption system – was planned to be launched soon afterwards but did not come to fruition. A package of channels called MultiChoice Kaleidoscope launched on 1 November 1993 using VideoCrypt 2 encryption. The MultiChoice service was run by South Africa-based Network Holdings, separate from BSkyB, and initially included Filmnet and The Adult Channel as premium channels, and The Children's Channel (in Benelux only), Discovery Channel, MTV, Country Music Television and QVC as basic channels.

=== Promotion ===
BSkyB ran television advertisements prior to the new service launching. However, in 1993, the Independent Television Commission ruled against BSkyB after ten complaints regarding a number of false claims involving some of the channels which were due to be part of the package, as well as further complaints about the commercials failing to state that a one-year contract had to be taken out to take advantage of any special introductory offer.

In conjunction with the launch of the Multichannels package, all Sky networks adopted a cohesive graphical and music appearance as idents featured the logo's newly-added "ring" forming out of swirling energy streaks while the text formed out of glass copies. The graphics were produced by American graphical firm Novocom, the look for Sky News resembling their earlier work for the CBS Evening News from 1991. A new music package from composer Frank Gari dubbed the Sky Symphony was also used, with differing arrangements per channel (Sky News utilized a variant with the signature of Gari's pre-existing "Great News" package in 1989, which had been used since launch and received a slight update with the new look). The full package was used in promotional spots for what was termed as "the brand new Sky" and during periods where BSkyB channels were off the air.

To promote the Sky Multichannels package on the Astra satellites, a selection of channels was placed on Sky's preview service on transponder 47 of Astra 1C in the clear This showed promotional material in the centre of the screen and 12 channels around the edge, including some English services which were not part of the package. During football matches on Sky One, services which were also part of the Multichannels package were made available free-to-view, allowing sports subscribers to sample them. This continued until the launch of Sky Sports 2 on 19 August 1994.

=== Closure ===
Due to the growth of digital television and the Sky platform, alongside greater choice and the reduced need for channels to timeshare due to bandwidth constraints, BSkyB announced that its analogue service would cease transmission with all channels in this package closing by 2001. The first to be ceased was TV Travel Shop which became exclusive to digital in late 1999, and by February 2000 many of the channels on Astra 1D had been discontinued.

On 9 May 2001, it was announced that due to the possibility of lost revenue from the 242,000 analogue subscribers, the closure of the remaining analogue channels would be delayed from June to September. BSkyB closed down the last service in the Multichannels package - Sky One - on 27 September of that year.

== Channel list ==
=== 1993 ===
The subscription cost was £6.99 a month at launch, although those who signed up before 1 September 1993 could get the channels for £3.99 a month until the start of 1994. Additional packages including the multiple channels alongside one or more of Sky's premium channels were available from £11.99 to £19.99. The channels were encrypted using NDS Group's VideoCrypt system, and viewing them required a monthly subscription payment, a decoder and a valid viewing card.

Channel name	Encryption status (at launch)	Genre (at the time)	Notes
Sky One	encrypted using VideoCrypt	General entertainment	20 hours (when closed hours for highlights)
Sky News	Free-to-air	News	24 hours
UK Living	encrypted using VideoCrypt	General entertainment for women	7.00am to 1.00am, part owned by Flextech
Nickelodeon	encrypted using VideoCrypt	Children's programming	7.00am to 7.00pm, Nick at Nite was planned to launch in 1994, but the plans were scrapped.
Bravo	encrypted using VideoCrypt	Classic TV and movies	Midday to midnight, sharing with The Adult Channel
Country Music Television	encrypted using VideoCrypt	Country music videos	Midnight to 4.00pm, time-shared with Discovery Channel
Discovery Channel	encrypted using VideoCrypt	Documentaries	4.00pm to midnight, time-shared with Country Music Television
UK Gold	encrypted using VideoCrypt	Classic programming	
The Children's Channel	encrypted using VideoCrypt	Children's programming	6.00am to 5.00pm, time-shared with The Family Channel
The Family Channel	encrypted using VideoCrypt	General entertainment	5.00pm to 5.00am, time-shared with The Children's Channel
QVC	Free-to-view encrypted using VideoCrypt	Shopping	Launched on 1 October 1993
MTV	Free-to-air	Music videos	24 hours. MTV did not encrypt at the time that Sky Multichannels launched, but did so on 3 July 1995, while the channel was encrypted with VideoCrypt 1 for British viewers and in VideoCrypt 2 for European viewers
VH1	encrypted using VideoCrypt	Music videos aimed towards middle-agers	Launched on 1 October 1994, but was promoted from the start

=== 1995 ===
In 1995, the number of Sky customers exceeded five million. Sky Sports 2, Sky Soap and Sky Travel which launched on 3 October 1994 joined the package. By October and November 1995, the launch of Astra 1D allowed Sky to expand the Multichannels package further with the Sci-Fi Channel, The Paramount Channel, Sky Sports Gold and The History Channel, as well as The Disney Channel, Christian Channel Europe, European Business News, Television X and Playboy TV which were added to Astra 1C. QVC, which launched as part of the Multichannels package, switched to free-to-view broadcasting in this year.

Channel number	Channel name	Encryption status	Genre (at the time)	Notes
1	Sky One	encrypted using VideoCrypt	General entertainment	24 hours
6	UK Living	encrypted using VideoCrypt	General entertainment for women	6.00am to midnight
7	Nickelodeon	encrypted using VideoCrypt	Children's programming	7.00am to 7.00pm, time-shared with The Paramount Channel following 1 November 1995
7	The Paramount Channel	New channel, encrypted using VideoCrypt	Comedy and drama	Launched on 1 November 1995: 7.00pm to 4.00am, time-shared with Nickelodeon
8	The Learning Channel	New channel, encrypted using VideoCrypt	Educational programming	9.00am to 4.00pm, time-shared with Discovery
8	Discovery Channel	encrypted using VideoCrypt	Documentaries	4.00pm to midnight, time-shared with TLC
9	UK Gold	encrypted using VideoCrypt	Classic programming	
10	The Children's Channel	encrypted using VideoCrypt	Children's programming	6.00am to 5.00pm, time-shared with The Family Channel
10	The Family Channel	encrypted using VideoCrypt	General entertainment	5.00pm to midnight, time-shared with The Children's Channel
11	Sky Travel	New channel, encrypted using VideoCrypt	Travel programming	Launched on 3 October 1994: 6.00am to midday on weekdays (see notes below)
11	Sky Soap	New channel, encrypted using VideoCrypt	Soap operas	Launched on 3 October 1994: Midday to 4.00pm on weekdays (see notes below)
11	The History Channel	New channel	History-related programming	Launched on 11 November 1995: 4.00pm to 8.00pm
11	Sci-Fi Channel	New channel	Entertainment with science fiction and horror themes	Launched on 1 October 1995: 8.00pm to 4.00am
12	QVC	Free-to-view encrypted using VideoCrypt	Shopping	Launched on 1 October 1993, but was promoted from the start
13	European Business News	New channel, encrypted using VideoCrypt	Business and news	6.00am to midday, sharing with Bravo and The Adult Channel
13	Bravo	encrypted using VideoCrypt	Classic TV and movies	Midday to midnight
14	Country Music Television	encrypted using VideoCrypt	Country music videos	6.00am to 7.00pm, time-shared with JSTV
15	MTV	Free-to-air	Music videos	MTV did not encrypt at the time that Sky Multichannels launched, but did so on 3 July 1995, while the channel was encrypted with VideoCrypt 1 for British viewers and in VideoCrypt 2 for European viewers
16	VH1	New channel, encrypted using VideoCrypt	Music videos aimed towards middle-agers	Launched on 1 October 1994, but was promoted from the start

Channel 11 notes (up until October 1995):

- Midnight to 6.00am: Chinese Channel – daily entertainment and news service (PAL/clear)
- 8.00am to midday on weekdays: Sky Soap (PAL/VideoCrypt/Multi-channel)
- Midday to midnight on Mondays to Thursdays, and midday to 6.00pm on Fridays: Sky Travel (PAL/VideoCrypt/Multi-channel)
- 6.00pm to midnight on Fridays, and 8.00am to midnight on Saturdays and Sundays: Sky Sports 2 (PAL/VideoCrypt/Sports subscription)

=== 1996 ===
In 1996, Sky reached six million subscribers. New channels included Sky Sports 3 (replacing Sky Sports Gold), along with Sky 2, Computer Channel, Granada Sky Broadcasting (with Plus, Men & Motors, Good Life and Talk TV), Weather Channel UK, HSN Direct, Fox Kids, Sky Scottish and Trouble (from early 1997).

Channel number	Channel name	Encryption status	Genre (at the time)	Notes
1	Sky One	encrypted using VideoCrypt	General entertainment	
6	UK Living (later renamed Living TV on 27 October 1997)	encrypted using VideoCrypt	General entertainment for women	Part owned by Flextech
7	Nickelodeon	encrypted using VideoCrypt	Children's programming	7.00am to 7.00pm, time-shared with The Paramount Channel
7	The Paramount Channel	encrypted using VideoCrypt	Comedy and drama	7.00pm to 4.00am, time-shared with Nickelodeon
8	European Business News	encrypted using VideoCrypt	Business and news	7.00am to midday
8	Trouble	encrypted using VideoCrypt	Teenage-related programming	Launched on 3 February 1997: Midday to 8.00pm
8	Bravo	encrypted using VideoCrypt	Classic TV and movies (with action, horror and erotic content from 3 February 1997)	8.00pm to 7.00am
9	UK Gold	encrypted using VideoCrypt	Classic programming	
10	The Children's Channel	encrypted using VideoCrypt	Children's programming	6.00am to 5.00pm, time-shared with The Family Channel
10	The Family Channel (later renamed Challenge TV on 3 February 1997)	encrypted using VideoCrypt	General entertainment	5.00pm to 5.00am, time-shared with The Children's Channel
11	Sky Travel	encrypted using VideoCrypt	Travel programming	7.00am to midday on weekdays
11	Sky Soap	encrypted using VideoCrypt	Soap operas	Midday to 4.00pm on weekdays
11	The History Channel	encrypted using VideoCrypt	History-related programming	4.00pm to 8.00pm on weekdays
11	Sci-Fi Channel	encrypted using VideoCrypt	Entertainment with science fiction and horror themes	8.00pm to 4.00am on Mondays to Wednesdays, and 1.00am to 4.00am on Thursdays to Sundays
12	QVC	Free-to-view encrypted using VideoCrypt	Shopping	Launched on 1 October 1993, but was promoted from the start
13	The Learning Channel (later renamed Discovery Home & Leisure on 3 April 1997)	encrypted using VideoCrypt	Educational programming	9.00am to 4.00pm
13	Discovery Channel	encrypted using VideoCrypt	Documentaries	4.00pm to 2.00am
13	HSN Direct	encrypted using VideoCrypt	Shopping	2.00am to 9.00am
14	Fox Kids	New channel, encrypted using VideoCrypt	Cartoons	Launched on 19 October 1996: 6.00am to 7.00pm, sharing with Sky 2
14	Sky 2	New channel, encrypted using VideoCrypt	General entertainment	Launched on 1 September 1996: 7.00pm to 6.00am
15	MTV	encrypted using VideoCrypt	Music videos	
16	VH1	encrypted using VideoCrypt	Music videos aimed towards middle-agers	
20	Granada Plus	New channel, encrypted using VideoCrypt	Classic programming	Launched on 1 October 1996: 6.00am to 11.00pm, sharing with Granada Men & Motors
20	Granada Men & Motors	New channel, encrypted using VideoCrypt	Sports and cult TV aimed at men	Launched on 1 October 1996: 11.00pm to 2.00am, sharing with Granada Plus
21	Granada Good Life (later renamed Granada Breeze on 1 May 1998)	New channel, encrypted using VideoCrypt	Lifestyle programming aimed at women	Launched on 1 October 1996: 6.00am to 6.00pm, as the channel divided into four segments including 'Food & Wine', 'Health & Beauty', 'High Street' and 'Home & Garden'
21	Computer Channel	New channel, encrypted using VideoCrypt	Programming devoted to computing and information technology	Launched on 1 September 1996: 6.00pm to 8.00pm
22	Granada Talk TV	New channel, encrypted using VideoCrypt	Talk and phone-in programming	Launched on 1 October 1996: 6.00am to 6.00pm, but later ceased broadcasting on 31 August 1997
22	Sky Scottish	New channel, encrypted using VideoCrypt	Scottish-related programming	Launched on 1 November 1996: 6.00pm to 8.00pm
23	Sky Movies Gold	Premium channel	Classic movies	5.00pm to 5.00am
25	Country Music Television	encrypted using VideoCrypt	Country music videos	24 hours

=== 1997 ===
During 1997, but same as above:

- National Geographic Channel launches on 1 September, replacing Sky 2 as time shared with Fox Kids.
- Christian Channel Europe (4.00am to 11.00am), Sky Soap (11.00am to 4.00pm), History Channel (4.00pm to 8.00pm) and Sci-Fi Channel (8.00pm to 4.00am) moved to a new service to allow Sky Sports 2 and Sky Travel to broadcast longer, while European Business News, Trouble and Bravo continued to share a channel.
- UKTV network launched on 1 November, adding three new channels (UK Horizons, UK Style and UK Arena) which shared a service.
- Pay-per-view movies launched on Sky Box Office from 1 December 1997.
