= Astra 1C =

Communications satellite

- Mission type: Communications
- Operator: SES
- COSPAR ID: 1993-031A
- SATCAT no.: 22653
- Website: https://www.ses.com/
- Mission duration: 12 years (planned); 18 years (achieved)

Spacecraft properties
- Spacecraft type: Boeing 601
- Bus: HS-601
- Manufacturer: Hughes Space and Communications
- Launch mass: 2,790 kg (6,150 lb)
- Power: 3.5 kW

Start of mission
- Launch date: 12 May 1993, 00:56:32 UTC
- Rocket: Ariane 42L (V56)
- Launch site: Centre Spatial Guyanais, ELA-2
- Contractor: Arianespace
- Entered service: July 1993

End of mission
- Disposal: Graveyard orbit
- Deactivated: 2015

Orbital parameters
- Reference system: Geocentric orbit
- Regime: Geostationary orbit
- Longitude: Astra 19.2°E (1993-2006); Astra 5°E (2007-2008); 2°E (2008-2011); 73°W (2014); 1.2°W (2014); 152°W (2014); 40°W (2014-2015)

Transponders
- Band: 18 (+6) Ku-band
- Bandwidth: 26 MHz
- Coverage area: Europe

Astra 1C was a geostationary communications satellite launched in 1993 by SES. The satellite remained in service until 2011 and is now derelict.

== History ==
Astra 1C was the third communications satellite placed in orbit by SES, and was originally deployed at the Astra 19.2°E orbital position.

The satellite was intended to be replaced in 2002, along with Astra 1B, by Astra 1K but this satellite failed to reach its intended orbit. It was eventually relieved of its remaining television/radio payloads by Astra 1KR in 2006.

In November 2006, prior to the launch of Astra 1L to the 19.2° East position, Astra 1C was placed in an inclined orbit and moved first to 2.0° East for tests, and then in February 2007 to 4.6° East, notionally part of the Astra 5°E cluster of satellites but largely unused.

After November 2008, the satellite operated back at 2.0° East, in an inclined orbit. On 2 November 2011, the satellite was taken out of use as Eutelsat, the rightholder for the 3° allocation, came on air with Eutelsat 3A and current rules ask for a minimum of 2° separation. In the summer of 2014, the satellite was moved to 73° West, close to SES' AMC-6 satellite, to 1.2° West, to 152° West, and to 40° West next to SES-6. From January 2015, it was continuously moving west by approximately 5.2° per day.

== Transponders ==
Here are all the Channel Spaces used during its lifespan.

Transponder	Frequency	Channels carried
33	10,964 H	ZDF (1993-2012)
34	10,979 V	UK Living (1993–2001), Chinese Channel (1994–1995), Television X - The Fantasy Channel (1995-2001), Talent Channel (1997), Gay TV (1997-1998)
35	10,994 H	The Children's Channel (1993–1998), The Family Channel (1993–1997), China News and Entertainment (1993–1994), HSN (1996-1997), Challenge (1997–2001), Family Late (1997-2001), Travel Industry (1997-1999) TV Travel Shop (1998-2001), CNBC Europe (1998), Screenshop (1999-2001), Arte (2002-2012)
36	11,009 V	Minimax (1993–1997), Sportsmania (1996), Documanía (1996-1997), Phoenix (1997-2012)
37	11,023 H	Cartoon Network UK/Europe (1993-1999), Cartoon Network UK (1999-2001), TNT Classic Movies UK/Europe (1993-1999), TNT UK (1999-2000), TCM UK (2000-2001), B.TV (2001-2003), BTV4U (2003-2004), Astro TV (2005-2008)
38	11,038 V	QVC UK (1993-2001)
39	11,053 H	West3 (1993-1994), WDR Fernsehen (1994-2012)
40	11,068 V	Cineclassics (1993–1997), Astra Vision (1997), Hessen Fernsehen (1997-2012)
41	11,082 H	Discovery Channel UK (1993–2001), CMT Europe (1993–1994), TLC UK (1994-1997), Regal Shop (1995-1996), ENB (1996-1998), HSN (1996-1997), Screenshop (1997-1998), Discovery Home & Leisure UK (1997–2001), Quantum 24 (1999), Shop America (1999-2001), BR-alpha (2002-2012)
42	11,097 V	Bravo (1993–2001), EBN (1995-1998), H.V.C (1993-1995), The Adult Channel (1993-1995), HSN (1996-1997), Trouble (1997–2001), Playboy Channel (1995-1997), CNBC Europe (1998), Screenshop (1998-2001)
43	11,112 H	MDR Fernsehen (1993-2012)
44	11,127 V	Galavision (1993–1997), Sky Travel (1997-2001), Sky Movies Gold (1997-1998), TV Shop (1998-2000), Sky Cinema (1998-2001), VIVA (2000-2010)
45	11,141 H	Bayerisches Fernsehen (1993-2012)
46	11,156 V	Nickelodeon UK (1993–2001), TV Asia (1993-1994), The Paramount Channel (1995-1997), VH-1 Germany (1995), Paramount Comedy Channel (1997-2001)
47	11,171 H	Astra 1C News (1993-1994), Sky Barker (1994), China News & Entertainment (1994-1995), Sky Sports 2 (1994-2001), Sky Soap (1994-1997), Sky Travel (1994-1997), Sci-fi Channel UK (1995-1997), Sky Sports Gold (1995-1996), The History Channel UK (1995-1997), Christian Channel Europe (1995-1997) Bloomberg UK (2002-2003), SFB1 (2002-2003), RBB Berlin (2003-2005), 1-2-3.TV (2004-2008), Astro TV (2004-2005)
48	11,186 V	Südwest 3 (1993-1998), SWR Baden-Württemberg (1998-2012)

== See also ==
- Astra 19.2°E previous orbital position
- Astra 5°E previous orbital position
- SES satellite owner
