= TV Travel Shop =

British television channel

Ownership
- Owner: IAC/InterActive Corp.

History
- Launched: 4 April 1998
- Closed: 16 April 2005
- Replaced by: Top Up TV encrypted channels (DTT) iBuy (other platforms)

Links
- Website: www.tvtravelshop.com (now points to Expedia)

Availability At time of closure

Terrestrial
- Freeview: Channel 17 (1)

TV Travel Shop was a British television channel that sold holidays.

== History ==
TV Travel Shop was created in a partnership between UK travelman Harry Goodman and British broadcasting conglomerate Flextech. The service originally launched on 4 April 1998, taking the transponder space that became available following the closure of The Children's Channel the day before, on analogue satellite and cable, airing from 6:00 am–5:00 pm, timesharing with Challenge TV.

In 1999, the channel launched on Sky Digital and began airing 24 hours a day. In August, Flextech revealed a £14 million loss from the launch of TV Travel Shop and its sister business Screenshop.

In March 2000, Flextech sold a 38% stake in the business to Barclays Private Equity. Later on in the year, the channel launched on ONdigital, using capacity from ONrequest 2 (later ITV Select 2), and broadcast 6 am-12 pm weekdays, and 6 am-10 am weekends, free to air on channel 44. In the same year, a sister channel, TV Travel Shop 2 was launched on Sky Digital, offering late bargains, new places, and repeats of shows from TV Travel Shop. This was positioned next to TV Travel Shop on Sky Digital.

In December 2001, TV Travel Shop 2 launched on NTL.

Its hours on ITV Digital were extended in January 2002 to be broadcast from 6 am-6 pm daily. However, after the demise of ITV Digital, TV Travel Shop made a deal with the multiplex operator, SDN, to carry the channel 24 hours a day using the newly freed-up capacity. It moved to channel 17 at the launch of Freeview.

In January 2002, TV Travel Shop had talks with USA Networks, the then-owners of Expedia, for a potential takeover. The business was soon purchased by USA later on in the year. In December, TV Travel Shop launched its first advertising campaign on free-TV under a sponsorship deal with ITV for New Year's Eve and New Year's Day 2002/2003.

In July 2003, Goodman announced he had resigned from the business. In December, Top Up TV was looking to buy slots for their new subscription platform, and acquired the slot and LCN occupied by TV Travel Shop. The channel went off air on 1 February 2004, and its stream was replaced on 30 March 2004 by a Top Up TV subscription stream.

In March 2005, TV Travel Shop announced that it would begin to focus on selling properties from sister company Expedia in a bit to cut costs. A month later, TV Travel Shop silently ceased operations with its Sky EPG slots being sold to iBuy. The IAC and Expedia separation was later completed in August After TV Travel Shop ceased operations, all sales were moved to an Expedia call centre in Belfast, whilst the cruise department remained in Bromley.
