= Turner Classic Movies (Northern European TV channel) =

- Broadcast area: Netherlands & Flanders; Nordic countries
- Headquarters: Turner House, Great Marlborough Street, London, United Kingdom

Programming
- Languages: Audio; English; Subtitles; Danish; Dutch; Finnish; Norwegian; Swedish
- Picture format: 4:3, 576i SDTV

Ownership
- Owner: Turner Broadcasting System Europe (WarnerMedia)

History
- Launched: 17 September 1993; 32 years ago
- Closed: 1 January 2014; 12 years ago (Netherlands & Flanders); 1 June 2017; 8 years ago (Nordic countries)
- Former names: TNT (1993-1999)

Turner Classic Movies (TCM or sometimes called TCM Nordic) was a television channel broadcasting "classic" films from the 1930s to the 1990s (mostly from the Warner Bros. and pre-May 1986 MGM film libraries) to Denmark, Finland, Flanders, Iceland, Netherlands, Norway and Sweden. The channel used English audio with optional subtitles in Danish, Dutch, Finnish, Norwegian and Swedish. The channel was commercial-free and films were not interrupted.

== History ==
The channel launched as TNT Classic Movies on 17 September 1993 and was broadcast on the same frequency as Cartoon Network. TNT Classic Movies became a 24-hours channel in July 1997. The combined version did however still continue on some networks.

On 15 October 1999, TNT Classic Movies changed its name into Turner Classic Movies. In early 2009, the channel adopted a new logo and a new look.

In late 1996, TNT and Cartoon Network launched on Intelsat 707 and became a part of the analogue CTV package. The analogue broadcast ended on 3 September 2001. The channel has been part of the Canal Digital satellite package since 1997. Their competitor Viasat added Turner Classic Movies and Cartoon Network as a shared channel on 23 September 2005.

Turner Classic Movies was allowed to broadcast in the Swedish digital terrestrial network in June 2004. In addition it is also available through many cable networks.

On 1 July 2011, UPC Netherlands removed Turner Classic Movies from its line-up due to "a low appreciation of the channel by its customers."

Sister channel TNT relaunched in Belgium, exclusively through cable network Telenet on 10 April 2012. The channel relaunched in the Netherlands as well but almost one year later on 24 January 2013. TNT offered a mix of comedy's, movies and TV series such as Falling Skies, Shameless, Memphis Beat and classic series such as E.R., The West Wing and Smallville.

In September 2013 Turner Broadcasting Systems revealed its plans to close down the channel for the Benelux market. The end date was set on 1 January 2014.

On 1 June 2017 Turner Classic Movies closed down in all of the Nordic countries.
