= National Hugging Day =

Annual event

National Hug Day
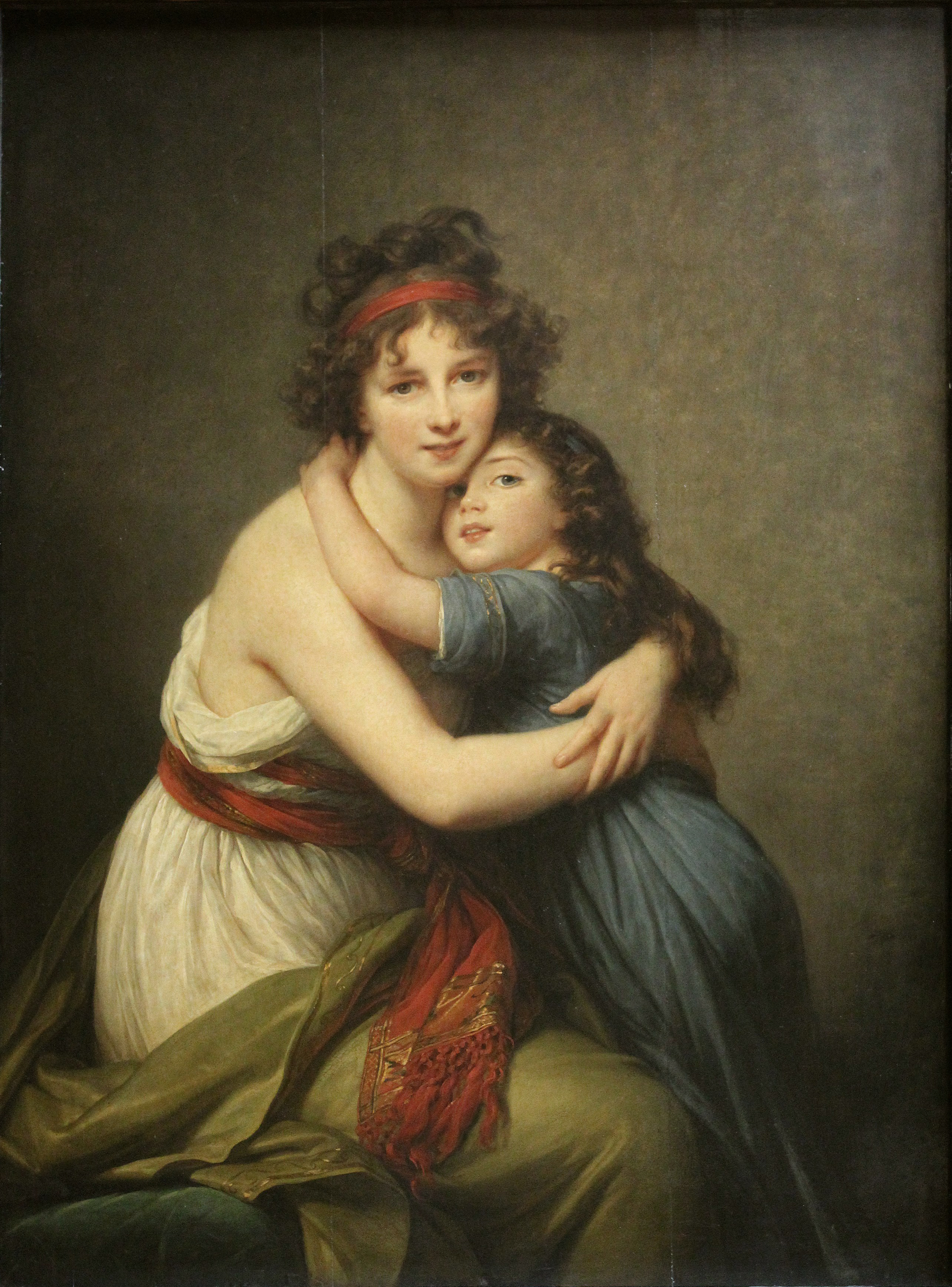
- A mother and daughter hugging
- Official name: National Hug Day
- Also called: National Hug Day, International Hug Day, Global Hug Day
- Observed by: United States, United Kingdom - Globally
- Type: Secular
- Celebrations: Offer hugs to others
- Date: January 21
- Next time: 21 January 2027
- Frequency: Annual

National Hugging Day is an annual event dedicated to hugging in the United States. It was created by Kevin Zaborney and occurs annually on January 21. The day promotes consensual hugging and the power of hugs between family members and friends. Some hugging events may aim to fundraise for charities.

The day was first launched and celebrated in 1986 from Clio, Michigan. The holiday is also observed in many other countries. The idea of National Hug Day is to encourage everyone to hug family and friends more often. Zaborney cautions to ask first if one is unsure of the response, as respecting the personal space of others is always important and some people are not huggers. However, the psychological benefits of hugging are often highlighted on National Hugging Day, with a focus on its improving mental health.

== History ==
Rev. Kevin Zaborney is credited with coming up with the idea of National Hugging Day in 1986. It was included in Chase's Calendar of Events; Zaborney's friend at the time was the granddaughter of the proprietors of the publication. He chose January 21st as it fell between the December holidays of Christmas/Chanukah/New Year's and Valentine's Day when he found many people experience depression. Zaborney considered that "American society is embarrassed to show feelings in public", and hoped that a National Hugging Day would change that, although he initially thought that his idea would fail.

During the COVID-19 pandemic, alternatives to hugging were emphasized in the media, while Zaborney supported caution while not eliminating hugging within family groups.

== See also ==
- Free Hugs Campaign
- Blue Monday, most depressing day of the year that occurs the same week
