= TNT Benelux =

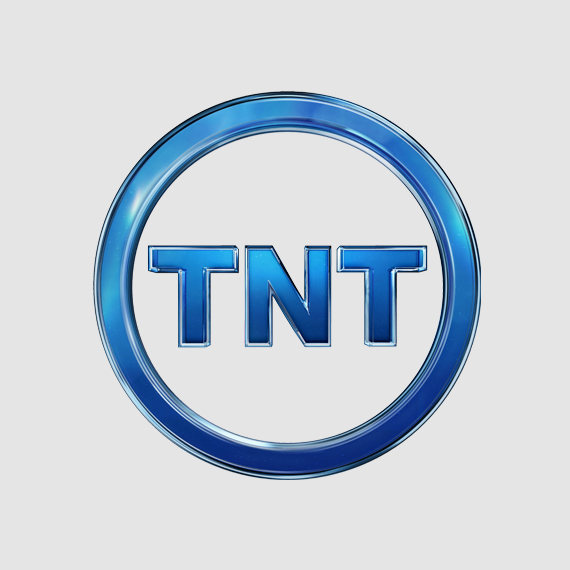
- Broadcast area: Belgium; Netherlands
- Headquarters: Turner House, Great Marlborough Street, London, United Kingdom

Programming
- Languages: Dutch; English

Ownership
- Owner: Turner Broadcasting System Europe; Time Warner
- Sister channels: Cartoon Network; Boomerang; TCM

History
- Launched: April 10, 2012; 14 years ago (Belgium); January 24, 2013; 13 years ago (Netherlands)
- Closed: January 1, 2014; 12 years ago

Links
- Website: www.tnt-tv.be (Belgium) www.tnt-tv.nl (Netherlands)

TNT Benelux was a pay television channel of Benelux, and served as a variant of the original channel. It was owned by Turner Broadcasting System Europe and aired dramas (the main content) as well as comedy series.

== History ==
The channel launched in Flanders on April 10, 2012, as a Telenet Digital TV exclusive. The launch of the channel was accompanied by the viral TNT-Telenet "drama button" campaign, which was seen more than ten million times around the world as of April 13, 2012. At its beginning, TNT only broadcast in HD, but then an SD version was also added.

On January 24, 2013, TNT launched in the Netherlands, as part of KPN and Glashart from Reggefiber.

On September 9, 2013, Turner Broadcasting System announced that both TNT and its sister channel TCM would cease broadcasting in the Benelux starting from January 1, 2014.

== Programming ==
- 30 Rock
- Add a Friend
- The Crimson Petal and the White
- ER
- Falling Skies
- Friday Night Lights
- In Plain Sight
- The IT Crowd
- Killing Time
- Live from Abbey Road
- Memphis Beat
- Men of a Certain Age
- Monday Mornings
- The O.C.
- The Office US
- Phone Shop
- Psych
- Satisfaction
- Shameless
- Smallville
- Southland
- Supernatural
- The Sinking of the Laconia
- Trollied
- Web Therapy
- The West Wing

=== Adult Swim op TNT ===
- Aqua Teen Hunger Force
- Robot Chicken
- Tim & Eric

== See also ==
- TNT
- Turner Classic Movies (Northern European TV channel)
