= Blue Monday (date) =

Supposed saddest day of the year

Blue Monday is a day in January (typically the third Monday of the month) which is said by UK travel agency Sky Travel to be the most depressing day of the year. It takes into account weather conditions and thus only applies to the Northern Hemisphere temperate zones. The day was given its name by former Cardiff University health psychologist Cliff Arnall in 2005. Arnall is a member of The British Psychological Society (BPS).

Some have dismissed the idea as pseudoscience.

Mental health advocacy groups, including the Samaritans and Mind, have used Blue Monday to facilitate talk about mental health.

== Date ==
The date is generally reported as falling on the third Monday in January, but also on the second or fourth Monday. The first such date declared was 24 January in 2005 as part of a Sky Travel press release.

== Calculation ==
The Blue Monday formula is expressed as:

$\frac{[W + (D-d)] \times T^Q}{M \times N_a}$

Where:

- $W$ = Weather/Light exposure
- $D-d$ = Debt minus ability to pay
- $T$ = Time since Christmas
- $Q$ = Failed quit attempts (New Year's resolutions)
- $M$ = Motivational levels
- $N_a$ = Need to take action

The 2005 press release and a 2009 press release:

$$\frac{[W + (D-d)] \times T^Q}{M \times N_a}$$

where W = weather, D = debt, d = monthly salary, T = time since Christmas, Q = time since the failure of new year's resolutions, M = low motivational levels, and N_{a} = the feeling of a need to take action.

One relationship used by Arnall in 2006 was:

$$\frac{(C \times R \times ZZ)}{((Tt + D) \times St)} + (P \times Pr)>400$$

where Tt = travel time; D = delays; C = time spent on cultural activities; R = time spent relaxing; ZZ = time spent sleeping; St = time spent in a state of stress; P = time spent packing; Pr = time spent in preparation.

British science writer Ben Goldacre has observed that Arnall's equations "fail even to make mathematical sense on their own terms", pointing out that under the 2006 equation, packing for ten hours and preparing for 40 will always guarantee a good holiday, and that "you can have an infinitely good weekend by staying at home and cutting your travel time to zero". Dean Burnett, a neuroscientist who has worked in the Psychology department of Cardiff University, described the work as "farcical" with "nonsensical measurements", in 2013.

In 2016, Arnall claimed to have attempted to "overturn" his "theory" by visiting the Canary Islands; his claim was publicised by the Canary Islands Tourism Board which resulted in the Stop Blue Monday campaign receiving a gold award in London in 2017 for the Best International Campaign in 2016.

== History ==
This date was published in a press release under the name of Cliff Arnall, who was at the time a Research Associate in Psychology with University Hospital Wales (UHW), Department of Obstetrics & Gynaecology and psychology tutor and psychologist at the Centre for Lifelong Learning, a Further Education centre attached to Cardiff University. The Guardian columnist Ben Goldacre reported that the press release was delivered substantially pre-written to a number of academics via public relations agency Porter Novelli, along with an offer of money to those who offered to put their names to it. A statement later printed in The Guardian sought to distance leaders of Cardiff University from Arnall: "Cardiff University has asked us to point out that Cliff Arnall … was a former part-time tutor at the university but left in February."

Variations of the story have been repeatedly reused by other companies in press releases, with 2014 seeing Blue Monday invoked by legal firms and retailers of bottled water and alcoholic drinks. Some versions of the story purport to analyse trends in social media posts to calculate the date.

In 2018, Arnall told a reporter at the Independent newspaper that it was "never his intention to make the day sound negative", but rather "to inspire people to take action and make bold life decisions". It was also reported that he was working with Virgin Atlantic and Virgin Holidays, having "made it his mission to challenge some of the negative news associated with January and to debunk the melancholic mind-set of 'Blue Monday'".

== Happiest day ==
Arnall also says, in a press release commissioned by Wall's ice cream, that he has calculated the happiest day of the year – in 2005, 24 June, in 2006, 23 June, in 2008, 20 June and in 2010, 18 June. So far, this date has fallen close to Midsummer in the Northern Hemisphere (June 21 to 24).

== See also ==
- National Hugging Day which occurs the same week
