= Trouble (TV channel) =

- Trouble's final logo, used from 2005 to 2009
- Country: United Kingdom
- Broadcast area: United Kingdom; Ireland

Programming
- Picture format: 16:9, 576i (SDTV)
- Timeshift service: Trouble +1

Ownership
- Owner: Virgin Media Television (Virgin Media)

History
- Launched: February 3, 1997; 29 years ago
- Replaced: TCC (teenage section)
- Closed: April 1, 2009; 17 years ago
- Replaced by: Living +2; Living2 +1

Links
- Website: www.trouble.co.uk

Trouble was a pay television channel operating in the United Kingdom and Ireland that was owned and operated by Virgin Media Television.

Trouble had a key demographic of young adults and teenagers, aged between 15 and 24. The channel aired primarily American and Australian imports, with only a small margin of programmes being British.

== History ==
In 1992, now-defunct television channel The Children's Channel, owned by Flextech, restructured its late-afternoon programming to focus on a teenage audience by launching a block called "TCC". TCC ran initially from 5:00 pm-7:00 pm, but beginning on 1 September 1993, to coincide with the launch of The Family Channel and Sky Multichannels, the channel's space was changed to end at 5:00 pm, including the TCC block, which now started at 3:00 pm.

Beginning on 3 February 1997, the TCC block was spun off by Flextech into its own channel - Trouble, running from 12:00pm-8:00pm, timesharing with Bravo, which had removed its daytime broadcast hours to focus more on an adult male audience. Trouble's programming consisted more of popular sitcoms, rather than the cartoons The Children's Channel originally aired. When Trouble launched, not only did it take TCC's teenage shows, but it also took TCC's entire in-vision continuity and most of its web services with it.

On 3 April 1998, Flextech closed down The Children's Channel with no warning to viewers, with the company citing that they wanted to focus more on the teenage market, which had been more successful in the ratings than TCC, who had failed to compete with numerous other children's channels. Trouble expanded its broadcast hours and now started at 7.00am, although it remained timesharing with Bravo while TCC's former slot became home to TV Travel Shop. A limited number of TCC's preteen shows were moved to Trouble and aired until 1999.

Trouble later launched on Sky, NTL, and Telewest's digital cable services, although it remained a timesharing network with Bravo. On Sky Digital and NTL, Trouble was in the children's section of the EPG, despite the adult nature of many of its programmes, while on Telewest, it was in the entertainment section.

In March 2002, Flextech announced as part of a five-year broadcast agreement with Sky, they would launch a radio-based spin-off of Trouble named Trouble Radio. The service however, never materialised.

In May 2003, the channel began to commission more original programs, including Date My Mate and a chat show named Talk to the Hand. In July, a timeshift network, Trouble Reload, launched on Sky Digital and Telewest Active Digital. The channel, which broadcast from 6:00 am-7:00 pm, aired Trouble's programmes half-an-hour later.

In February 2005, NTL Broadcast secured broadcast distribution to Trouble Reload through the Eurobird transponder. In October, Flextech announced a new look for Trouble created by design agency, Addiction. The new graphic package would include a mascot, Phinneas, and an explicit focus towards the 13-24-year-old crowd. The refresh also corosponded with the launch of a post-watershed strand aimed for the young adult market, entitled Trouble Later. The relaunch also corresponded with the channel's move out of the Kids' packages on Sky and NTL into the general entertainment sections, while Trouble Reload became a one-hour timeshift service and was renamed to Trouble +1.

=== Closure ===
On 3 February 2009, it was announced that Trouble +1 would close down on 5 February and would be replaced with Living2 +1, a timeshift service of Living2. Following this news, on 17 March, Virgin Media Television announced that they would close down Trouble outright and replace it with a second spin-off of Living. On 24 April, VMT officially confirmed that the channel would close on 1 April, and its broadcast capacity would be used to launch a two-hour timeshift of Living, entitled Living +2, until plans were made to launch the planned third Living network. Trouble closed as planned on that day after 12 years of airing and was replaced with Living +2 that day. The planned third Living network would eventually become Living Loves, and was launched the following year.
