= CMT Europe =

Country Music Television Europe

Ownership
- Owner: Gaylord Entertainment Company

History
- Launched: October 1992; 33 years ago
- Closed: March 31, 1998; 28 years ago

CMT Europe was a European television channel. It was a European version of Country Music Television.

The channel started in 1992 and in September 1993 it launched on transponder 41 on Astra 1C as part of the Sky Multichannels package, where it was broadcasting on The Discovery Channel's daytime space and was on air from midnight until 4pm. The channel switched satellite position several times and was for a long time only available as a daytime service. It moved to transponder 24 on Astra 1B in September 1994, which allowed it to extend its broadcast hours until 7 p.m. It finally ended up on transponder 51 in 1996 and was then able to go 24 hours on Astra.

For cable networks, a 24-hour feed of CMT Europe was maintained on Intelsat 27.5 degrees west. It was available in several European countries, for example in Sweden. It was carried as part of the Scandinavian channel Sky Entertainment when it launched in September 1997. In the UK, it was available 24 hours a day on cable. However, a number of cable companies dropped CMT in autumn 1996, thereby reducing the potential audience for the channel. For example, Bell Cablemedia (later Cable & Wireless and then ntl) replaced CMT with The Box at the start of September 1996.

The channel closed down on March 31, 1998 due to substantial losses.
