= Sky Soap =

Former British satellite television channel devoted to soap operas (1994–1999)

- Country: United Kingdom

Ownership
- Owner: British Sky Broadcasting

History
- Launched: 3 October 1994
- Closed: 30 April 1999

Sky Soap was a British and Irish satellite television channel operated by British Sky Broadcasting devoted to American and British soap operas that include Emmerdale Farm, Take the High Road, Families and Albion Market.

== History ==
When Sky Channel was launched on the Astra satellite on 5 February 1989, the daytime schedule was overhauled and included a block of five soaps. The first, starting at 11.30am from Australia, The Sullivans, which was also still airing in some ITV regions. Next were four American daytime soaps – Another World, which had been airing on the channel since 1987, started at 12.00pm; followed by General Hospital from 12.55pm; and As the World Turns at 1.50pm and finally, Loving in a regular 2.45pm slot. A sixth soap opera, The Young Doctors, was another Australian serial also being broadcast on ITV. Sky Channel initially aired it in an early evening slot at 5.00pm, before switching to mid-afternoon after 6 months, and then finally, at 10:30am, from 1990.

The network changed its name to Sky One on 31 July 1989. The Sullivans, General Hospital and As the World Turns were all dropped, and in November 1990, newer American daytime soaps were added to the line-up: The Bold and the Beautiful and The Young and the Restless were both inherited from BSB's Galaxy channel following the corporate merger of the two companies, although neither were retained once the 3-year contract with BSB expired in 1993. In February 1991, Sky bought Santa Barbara, which was another soap opera originally broadcast on the ITV network. By 1993, with the addition of Australian soaps E Street and Paradise Beach to the schedules, as well as daytime repeat runs of American primetime series, St. Elsewhere and Falcon Crest, the block of daily soap operas on Sky One ran from 10.30am through to 3.30pm.

With the success of Sky One's daytime soap opera block, it was decided in 1994 to create a new, dedicated channel, and Sky Soap began broadcasting on 3 October 1994 from the Astra 1C satellite on weekdays between 8.00am and 12.00pm. The original line-up on the channel consisted entirely of American daytime soaps: a repeat run of the first season of Loving which originally aired on Sky One; Peyton Place (originally aired on ITV, and was replaced by Santa Barbara); plus, a new serial to UK viewers, Guiding Light, premiered, and As the World Turns returned, having aired on Sky One in 1989. Finally, current episodes of Another World, were moved across from Sky One.

The channel didn't attract viewers, and so the broadcast hours were changed to between 12.00pm and 4.00pm. By 1997, Sky Soap was broadcasting from Astra 1B, and the hours were extended to 11.00am to 4.00pm. The only American daytime soaps airing by then were As the World Turns and Guiding Light.

Old episodes of British soaps were added to the line-up from 1 November 1996, beginning with Emmerdale Farm and Take the High Road. A full run of Families was shown from 1 September 1997 until 26 November 1998, with Albion Market then shown from 27 November 1998 to 15 April 1999. Crown Court repeats began on 16 April 1999, just fourteen days before the channel closed.

Poor viewing figures following the launch of Sky Digital led to the channel's closure on 30 April 1999.

== Programming ==
=== American ===
- Another World
- As the World Turns
- Guiding Light
- Loving
- Peyton Place
- Santa Barbara

=== Australian ===
- E Street
- Paradise Beach

=== British ===
- Albion Market
- Emmerdale Farm (episodes from 1972–1988)
- Families
- Take the High Road (episodes from 1980-1989)
- Crown Court (11 episodes only due to channel closure)
