= Sky Travel =

Defunct TV channel in the UK and Ireland

- Final logo, used from 2007 to 2010

Ownership
- Owner: British Sky Broadcasting

History
- Launched: 3 October 1994
- Closed: 24 June 2010

Links
- Website: http://travel.sky.com (archived)

Sky Travel was a channel broadcasting travel television programming.

== History ==
Sky Travel launched as a weekday channel on 3 October 1994, as part of the Sky Multichannels package.It originally broadcast between Monday and Thursday between midday and midnight and on Friday between 12pm and 6pm until September 1997. In 2001, the channel started broadcasting 7 days a week from 6am until 11pm.

Sky Travel launched with Freeview on 30 October 2002, along with Sky News and Sky Sports News and the programming strategy for the channel was changed to attract a wider audience, skewing towards entertainment programmes with a travel theme, particularly reality shows.

In January 2005, a timeshifted version of Sky Travel was launched.

In October 2005, Sky Travel on Freeview was replaced by Sky Three and on 6 March 2006, the Sky Travel channels were moved from the "Entertainment" section on the Sky EPG, to the "Lifestyle and Culture" section, ahead of the channel moving to a schedule filled with reality TV programming with a spin-off channel, whilst Sky Travel Extra, dedicated its airtime to documentaries

In February 2003, a spin-off of the channels, Sky Travel Shop, launched a dedicated travel retail channel and this reverted back to Sky Travel when Sky Real Lives launched. In 2009, Sky Travel changed its logo slightly. The channel closed on 24 June 2010.

== Closure ==
On 24 May 2010, British Sky Broadcasting announced that they would close Sky Travel and the associated website on 24 June due to intense competition from the internet. A Sky spokesman said, "It was a difficult decision as the team has delivered a great product but the internet, rather than linear TV, has become the main channel for holiday retailing. In a competitive market, we will continue to focus on our core strategy of doing fewer things but better." Sky Travel closed at 11pm on 24 June 2010.

== See also ==
- Blue Monday
