= U&Gold =

British pay television channel launched 1992

- Logo used since 2024
- Country: United Kingdom
- Broadcast area: United Kingdom; Ireland; Isle of Man; Channel Islands

Programming
- Language: English
- Picture format: 1080i HDTV (downscaled to 16:9 576i for the SDTV feed)
- Timeshift service: U&Gold +1

Ownership
- Owner: BBC Studios
- Parent: UKTV
- Sister channels: U&Alibi; U&Dave; U&Drama; U&Eden; U&W; U&Yesterday

History
- Launched: 1 November 1992; 33 years ago
- Former names: UK Gold (1992–2004); UKTV Gold (2004–2008); G.O.L.D. (2008–2010); Gold (2010–2024)

Links
- Website: uandgold.co.uk

Availability

Streaming media
- Sky Go: Watch live (UK and Ireland only)
- Now: Watch live (UK and Ireland only)
- TalkTalk TV: Watch live (UK only)

U&Gold is a British premium television channel from the UKTV network that was launched in November 1992 as UK Gold before it was rebranded UKTV Gold in 2004. In 2008, it was split into flagship channel Gold and miscellaneous channel Watch (later U&W), with classic comedy based programming airing on Gold, non-crime drama and entertainment programming airing on Watch (later U&W), and quiz shows and more high-brow comedy airing on Dave (later U&Dave). In 2024, Gold was rebranded as U&Gold. It shows repeats of classic programming from the BBC, ITV and other broadcasters. Every December, from 2015 until 2018, the channel was temporarily renamed Christmas Gold. This has since been discontinued, though the channel continues to broadcast Christmas comedy.

== History ==
Gold logo used from 2012 to 2014

The rights to the BBC programmes were previously held by the BSB entertainment channel Galaxy, prior to the merger with Sky Television to form BSkyB in November 1990. By 1992, BBC programmes were no longer broadcast on any BSkyB channel, having latterly aired on The Comedy Channel.

Gold was formed as a joint venture between the BBC, through commercial arm BBC Enterprises, American company Cox Enterprises, and outgoing ITV London weekday franchisee Thames Television. The channel, named UK Gold, was to show repeats of the 'classic' archive programming from the two broadcasters. The channel launched on 1 November 1992 at 7 pm with Just Good Friends. The first commercial shown on the channel was for Lucozade, and all commercials shown in the first three breaks on the channel's launch night either had the word gold or golden in either the name of the brand advertised or mentioned in the commercial itself.

UK Gold was initially broadcast on an analogue transponder from an SES satellite at 19.2°E which was less well suited for UK reception. As a result, the channel used to be notorious for being marred with interference, known as 'sparklies', in large parts of the UK. Another initial drawback was the cutting of programming down to fit commercial time slots, and the intensive use of commercial breaks. Reception improved however with the channel added to BSkyB's basic subscription package in 1993, and the launch of the channel on cable services.

In 1993, Flextech gained its first stake in the station after acquiring Tele-Communications Inc.'s TV interests in Europe. In 1996, it started discussions about increasing its stake, to gain full control. At that point, Flextech held 27% with Cox (38%), BBC (20%) and Pearson (15%). By the Autumn, Flextech held 80% of UK Gold. Flextech's main reason for increasing its stake in UK Gold was participation in new talks with the BBC.

=== UKTV ===
The channel's success led to the launch of the UKTV network on 1 November 1997, owned by BBC Worldwide and Flextech, and consisting of three other channels: UK Arena, UK Horizons and UK Style, focusing on the arts, factual and lifestyle programmes respectively. The UKTV network would expand to include numerous more channels as the years progressed.

To coincide with the launch of Sky Digital, a sister network entitled UK Gold Classics was launched on 2 October 1998, becoming UKTV's first digital-exclusive network. The channel focused on older programmes than aired on the main UK Gold at its launch, as the main channel was at the time focusing on newer programmes. The channel only broadcast during the weekend, airing from 6 pm to 2 am; Friday to Sunday. On 28 March 1999, the channel closed under the "Classics" format and on 2 April 1999 was relaunched as UK Gold 2, becoming a secondary timeshift service that broadcast UK Gold's daytime schedule in the evening. Initially, the channel broadcast on weekends only, but expanded to a full 7-day-a-week schedule in June.

On 30 June 2002, UKTV announced the launch of a one-hour timeshift service of the network, entitled UK Gold +1. The channel launched on Sky the following month on 1 August. It initially only broadcast during the evening from 7 pm to 7 am, much like UK Gold 2 but on 12 November 2003, the channel gained a full 24-hour slot.

On 29 October 2003, UKTV announced that UK Gold 2 would be relaunched as UK G^{2} on 12 November, being reinvented as a younger-oriented edgier youth network aimed towards a 16–34-year-old demographic. The channel rebranded as such on that day, and alongside that, UK Gold +1 expanded to a full 24-hour schedule to match its parent network.

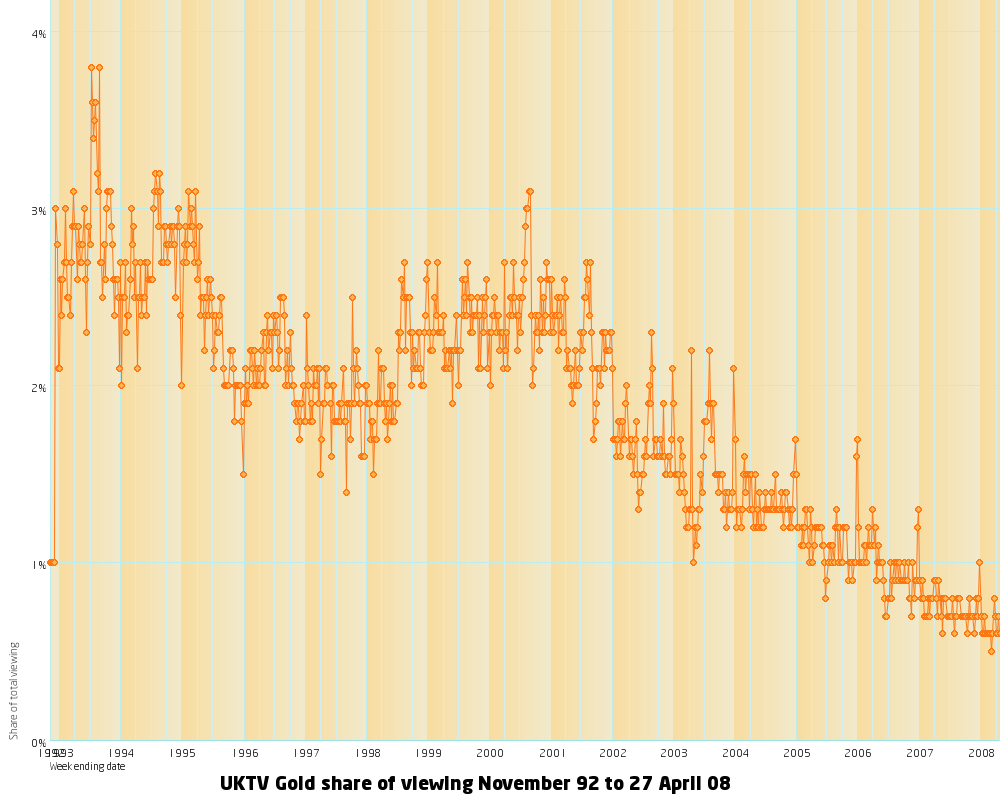
UKTV Gold share of viewing BARB figures 1992–2007

On 8 March 2004, to coincide with its sister channel's rebranding, the channel rebranded to UKTV Gold with its timeshift becoming UKTV Gold +1. At approximately the same time, Granada-run archive channel Granada Plus closed to make way for ITV3. The channels had always been the main rivals to Gold due to the direct mix of archive BBC and ITV programming. ITV3 currently has a higher viewer share, often put down to the fact that the terrestrial platform Freeview shows ITV3 but not Gold. In late 2004, to show films produced in Hollywood in a marathon, UKTV Gold temporarily changed its name to "USTV Gold".

Gold began transmitting in widescreen on 31 January 2008, although some programmes made in 16:9 format were screened in the compromise 14:9 semi-letterboxed ratio for a short while, before the 16:9 format became standard later in the year. The channel has been criticised by some, particularly in recent years, for featuring many recent programmes as opposed to 'classics' as was the original concept, with some shows appearing on the channel mere months or weeks after their first television broadcast.

=== 2008 rebrand ===
In 2008, UKTV began a process of rebranding and expanding its channels, removing "UKTV" from their name, following the rebranding of UKTV G2 as Dave in October 2007. On 7 October 2008, UKTV Gold became "G.O.L.D." (with its timeshift becoming G.O.L.D. +1), exclusively showing comedy, both old and new. This is reflected by its new slogan, which now represents Gold as a backronym—"Go On Laugh Daily". Unlike the complete name change for Dave, the Gold name was retained as having a resonance with viewers. The same day also saw the rebranding of UKTV Drama as Alibi, and the launch of a new channel, Watch. In Spring 2010, the channel dropped the backronym and is now known simply as "Gold", with its timeshift known as "Gold +1".

In October 2011, Virgin Media, owner of half of Gold and the rest of the UKTV network, sold their share to Scripps Networks Interactive, with the remaining half still retained by the BBC's commercial arm, BBC Worldwide.

=== 2012 programming investment ===
In February 2012, it was announced that UKTV was to invest millions into producing its own original shows. According to trade magazine Broadcast, Gold "has secured a budget running into "double-digit millions" to create a raft of new comedy shows over the next two years". The article went on to say "the channel is looking to develop a mix of panel shows, sketch shows, sitcoms and comedy dramas". This move meant that Gold would follow its sister, Dave, which had resurrected Red Dwarf and produced new panel and entertainment series. The first set of new series for Gold were broadcast in the latter half of 2012.

UKTV executive Jane Rogers stated to Broadcast that the commissions would be high‑quality, as "they would need to sit confidently alongside classics such as Only Fools And Horses and The Vicar of Dibley". She also added: "Gold is well entrenched in the UK's psyche as the home of national treasure comedies, so we cannot afford to look cheap next to those programmes. It's important that anything we order continues that love and feel, but we don't want to look back; we want a contemporary stamp on the channel." Commissioning editor Sarah Fraser commented that "there's never been a better time to invest in homegrown comedy. Comedians are selling out arena tours, being cast in the West End and on the big screen here and in the US."

The first programme announced as part of the investment was a reboot of the BBC sitcom, Yes, Prime Minister, to be based on the 2010 stage production and written by original writers Sir Antony Jay and Jonathan Lynn. The reboot was the second classic BBC sitcom to be resurrected by a UKTV network, following the two Dave-commissioned series of Red Dwarf. News about other new commissions for the channel were announced during the summer.

The channel was removed from Digital Terrestrial in 2013, along with Home as part of the closure of Top Up TV and was replaced with Drama in July 2013. However, Home relaunched on the platform in March 2016. Gold and Home were not available to watch on Freeview boxes and televisions due to them being encrypted as subscription channels on Top Up TV.

An HD version of Gold was launched on 2 October 2017 exclusively to Sky, replacing Eden HD on the platform. Gold HD was added to Virgin Media on 25 September 2018, replacing Gold in standard definition. It was added to BT TV on 11 March 2019, along with Vice HD.

== On-air identity ==
'Goldie' the UK Gold dog, used from 1992 to 1993

For the first few years, idents on UK Gold featured an animated golden retriever mascot named "Goldie" posing with the UK Gold logo. It was due to a study showing that the UK was leading in dog ownership, and this was to make the channel more friendly. Goldie was never name-checked as such on air, possibly owing to the death of the Blue Peter dog Goldie some weeks before launch, although the late-night music video slot Dog House was originally listed as Goldie's Video Bites in initial pre-launch listings. The Goldie idents were kept until 1993, when they were replaced with a form-up of the first logo against a blue background. A rebranding in 1994 saw UK Gold adopt idents based on the forging of gold bars, with the station's logo appearing to have been stamped into gold. Variations on this theme were used until 1997, when the channel received a revamp as part of the formation of the UKTV network.

A holding slide for the television programme Keeping Up Appearances which demonstrates the 1997–1999 corporate style

The new network's corporate identity saw all its channels logos simplified to a boxed "UK" followed by the name (e.g. "Gold") in the Gill Sans font, which had also been adopted by the BBC. The new network-wide ident theme would involve the splitting of the screen for different purposes. UK Gold's new idents depicted objects such as apples or leaves falling through the top half of the screen, with only the gold coloured ones reaching the bottom half of the screen. These idents were briefly adopted for UK Gold Classics when it launched in 1998 which then became UK Gold 2 in 1999.

The theme changed again, this time with idents featuring fireworks making shapes in the air, was launched in April 1999. The fireworks theme was carried on in a new set of idents, alongside another network-wide rebranding of the logo in 2001, adopting a bolder font and merging UK into a single composite character. A range of live-action idents showing everyday activities from unusual perspectives appeared in 2002. The 2003 to 2007 idents showed channel hopping viewers with their TV set "off stage" being brought to a halt by the appearance of a golden light accompanied by the channel's ident jingle. This new identity also featured a series of shifting yellow, orange and red blocks which suggested a gold bar at the centre of the screen.

On 4 April 2007, UKTV Gold unveiled a new on-air identity centred around a branded golden space hopper, playing to contemporary trends toward 1970s nostalgia, and emphasising the station's re-run content. Twelve new live action idents featured the branded space hopper, either with people on them bouncing around normally serious scenes, or let loose to bounce around the natural environment, aired from 5 April 2007 to 7 October 2008.

GOLD logo used from 2014 to 2024

On 7 October 2008, following the rebranding, Gold's 2008 presentation debuted, featuring cartoon objects making a giant chain, in Heath Robinson fashion, which triggers an event to herald the next programme. The Gold logo features in the centre, with the channel slogan usually appearing alongside in the sequence. Programmes are announced by sole channel continuity announcer David Flynn, who has had the position since June 2009.

In 2010, the logo was changed slightly, with an updated ident package. These followed a similar style to the previous set, but instead of the previous backronym, the idents focussed on the slogan of ‘Stick Something Funny On’. In May 2012, the dots were removed from the logo, now falling inline with how the channel is called.

In July 2014, Gold rebranded after two years in its second identity. The logo is a ribbon with the letters "GOLD". The new idents have funny and wacky stuff happening (such as cardboard dancing legs). At the end of the idents, the ribbon comes out saying "GOLD", while the activity behind it is still going.

In the rebranding to U&Gold, the 2014 idents were updated to feature the new logo, albeit in white.

== Other ventures ==
An analogue teletext service known as GoldText used to be available on the channel, but has since closed down.

== See also ==
- UKTV
- Television in the United Kingdom
- BBC Worldwide
