= The Children's Channel =

Former pan-European children's television network (1984–2000)

The Children's Channel (TCC)
- Country: United Kingdom
- Broadcast area: United Kingdom; Ireland; Netherlands and Flanders (1987-1996); Scandinavia and Finland (1988-2000)

Ownership
- Owner: Starstream (Flextech); Warner (partner)
- Sister channels: Bravo; Challenge TV; Living; Trouble

History
- Launched: 1 September 1984; 41 years ago
- Closed: 1 January 1996; 30 years ago (Dutch language feed); 3 April 1998; 28 years ago (main feed); 5 October 1998; 27 years ago (UK cable and Dutch satellite, both from Nordic feed); 30 September 2000; 25 years ago (Nordic)
- Replaced by: Trouble; Nickelodeon (Cablelink); Fox Kids (Cable & Wireless); Kindernet (Dutch cable)

Links
- Website: Wayback Archive

The Children's Channel, also known as TCC, was a British-based pan-European children's television channel in Europe, Asia and Africa, which was owned by Flextech in London, England, UK. It began broadcasting on the original Intelsat satellite on 1 September 1984, as the first dedicated channel to children's programming in the UK. Amid a crowded children's market, Flextech created a new teenage channel, Trouble, in 1997, with the rump TCC closing shortly after in 1998.

== History ==
=== Early years ===
The Children's Channel was launched on the original Eutelsat satellite on 1 September 1984, almost exclusively to cable households owing to the low proliferation of domestic satellite dishes in Europe at the time. The channel was owned by Starstream (a joint venture of British Telecom, DC Thomson, Thames Television and Thorn EMI) and worked closely with Warner-Amex. The channel was directed by Richard Wolfe, who had previously worked at Warner. "The Children's Channel" was created according to the old Nickelodeon concept (previously owned by Warner-Amex Cable Communications). The office was located in London at 6/7 D'Arblay Street.

The channel continued to expand by selling its own programmes in April 1986, and in November 1987, it launched in Benelux territories, including the Netherlands. The channel would launch in Scandivanian territories in January 1988.

In March 1989, The Children's Channel started airing free-to-air on the SES-owned Astra 1A satellite, airing from 5:00 am to 10:00 am on weekdays and from 5:00am to 12:00pm on weekends, time-sharing with Lifestyle. Following the launch of the Astra 1B satellite in 1991, The Children's Channel expanded its broadcast to 7:00 pm each day, time-sharing with JSTV.

=== Change of ownership ===
In 1990, Flextech acquired its first stake in the company, beating United Artists Cable International to gain a stake. In 1991, United bought its own stake in The Children's Channel and won the management contract to run it. In late 1993, Flextech held talks with Tele-Communications and acquired TCI's European programming business in exchange for shares, giving TCI a 50%-60% stake in the enlarged Flextech group. The deal was completed which resulted in Flextech increasing its stake from 50.1% to 75%. and by 5 June 1995, Flextech had completed its acquisition of The Children's Channel when it purchased the remaining 25.1% stake in Starstream for £15 million.

=== Later years ===
In 1992, The Children's Channel launched an evening block showing programming of greater interest to older children and teenagers. The segment, called simply TCC, aired from 5:00 pm to 7:00 pm, and featured several home-produced programmes, such as CDQ and TVFM, as well as American imports including Saved by the Bell. During the day, The Children's Channel continued targeting younger children, and a large amount of its programming output was still archive animated series from the 1980s. As time went on, the TCC block extended its hours, initially starting half an hour earlier at 4:30 pm, until the focus on teen programmes eventually became more prominent across The Children's Channel, which became known as TCC all day long starting from 16 January 1995. The demographic shift repositioned the channel away from its newly established competitors Nickelodeon UK and Cartoon Network Europe, to a market not adequately covered by others.

On 1 September 1993, The Children's Channel became encrypted on satellite when it moved from Astra 1A to Astra 1C as part of the launch of the Sky Multichannels package. Its on-air hours were cut back to 6:00 am to 5:00 pm so that it could share space with The Family Channel, which launched on the same day on the same transponder.

On 11 September 1995, TCC launched a pre-school strand entitled Tiny TCC, which featured the original program Tiny and Crew. It broadcast during the morning from 6:00 am to 9:00 am. On 24 October 1995, TCC launched its website, marking the occasion with an in-vision continuity piece where viewers asked questions via the net to the stars of Sweet Valley High. The website hoped to gain a following among teenagers, with content including fashion, music and games reviews, "gossip" and relationship advice.

In January 1996, TCC's Nordic feed separated from the UK version as it moved to the Intelsat 605 satellite and became localised in Swedish, Norwegian, Danish and Finnish. When Flextech had bought the entirety of TCC, it also acquired a 33% stake in the Dutch channel Kindernet. At the start of TCC Nordic, the Dutch language feed of TCC was closed in order to focus on Kindernet, and Dutch viewers on MultiChoice were redirected to TCC Nordic instead. The channel was removed entirely from cable operators.

In mid-1996, Flextech was in talks with Fox and News Corporation to sell off a 50% stake in TCC; however, extremely lengthy negotiations made it impossible to secure a deal. Flextech tried to undertake negotiations to secure a different form of investment in TCC, but decided to refocus on the teen and youth markets instead. News Corporation instead partnered with Saban Entertainment to launch a UK version of Fox Kids in a joint venture with sister company BSkyB. This strongly affected TCC as they no longer had access to most of Fox and Saban's library.

=== Split and closure ===
On 3 February 1997, TCC saw a major change to its schedule. All the teen programmes were spun off into their own network, Trouble, which broadcast on Bravo's capacity from 12:00 pm-8:00 pm, that channel itself having reduced its broadcast hours to focus more on an adult male audience. The other change was the removal of pre-school programming, with the Tiny TCC block moving to the newly rebranded Living and renamed to Tiny Living. TCC's in-vision continuity department was transferred to the new channel, as well as most of its online service. Teenage programming had reported 160% more viewership than the regular TCC fare.

The rump TCC re-ran a handful of programmes with no new additions. By October 1997, its end was being speculated, with an article in The Independent by former BBC Children's head Anna Home stating that TCC was 'about to disappear'. The channel's viewer share among the children's market stood at 0.2% in January 1998. In c. early 1998, Cablelink Ireland, the largest cable television provider in the Republic of Ireland, pulled TCC from its line-up, replacing it with Nickelodeon.

On 11 March 1998, Flextech announced that TCC would cease operations on 4 April, with its former capacity being used to expand Trouble's broadcast hours to start at 7:00 am. Flextech's vice president of programming, Lis Howell, stated that the company wanted to focus more on the teenage market following the successful launch of Trouble the previous year, and that the launch of other networks focused towards a child audience (Nickelodeon UK, Cartoon Network Europe, Disney Channel UK and Fox Kids UK) had proliferated the market.

The main feed of the channel ceased operations after 14 years on 3 April 1998, after an episode of Dennis and Gnasher. No on-air acknowledgment was made of TCC's end, with the regular closedown sequence playing at 5pm. TV Travel Shop took over the vacated Challenge TV timesharing slot on the Astra satellite, and on most providers. A couple of the programmes retained by the downsized TCC were transferred to Trouble, where they aired for another year.

Despite the UK version of the channel ceasing operations, TCC Nordic remained in operation due to a pre-agreed contract signed some years before by Flextech to keep the network in Scandinavia until October 2000. As this service was only fulfilling a contractual requirement at this point, an advertisement-free automated version of the channel was created that showed the same four weeks of programming on a constant loop. It was automated, all material not in English was removed, and technical difficulties were frequent. The service broadcast on the Thor I satellite from 6am to 6pm, timesharing with the Discovery Channel.

The channel was removed from Sweden's Telia cable network on 25 May 1998. In the UK, Cable & Wireless carried the localized TCC Nordic feed for a few months due to the company's displeasure at the closure of TCC at such short notice. TCC Nordic continued to broadcast on Intelsat 605, not only for Dutch-speaking and Scandinavian viewers, but also to provide Cable and Wireless's headend to relay the service to UK viewers. On 27 September 1998, it was announced that the channel would be taken off the service on 5 October and would be replaced with Fox Kids. On that day, TCC Nordic was removed from Intelsat altogether, and only remained on the D2-MAC-powered Thor I satellite, rendering it inaccessible to the Dutch satellite television audience.

On 30 September 2000, the channel finally closed altogether after the contract had expired.

The channel's website remained in operation until late 2005, when its domain lapsed.

== Programming ==
In its day, TCC created some original programming. Connect 4 and The Super Mario Challenge were popular tea-time quiz shows. Some other 'in-between' show segments included Link Anchorman, featuring Chuck the Chimp and Hopper the Penguin. All of the puppets were created and performed by Hands Up Puppets, primarily Marcus Clarke and Helena Smee. Other television talent made an appearance or got an early break working on these series, including Konnie Huq, then awaiting news of her university place.

During school holidays, RatKan was aired between 7.00am and 12.00pm, with It's Droibee Time off air.

Some of today's producers also got valuable early television introduction experience on these series, including Lisa Opie, Tim Lowe, Karen Ward, and Mike Crosby. A live-action quiz programme, Around the World in 80 Seconds is produced for the channel in 1993–94 was hosted by Timmy Mallett as Captain Everything, schoolchildren participated in a quiz based on geography and general knowledge of particular countries, before "replaying" famous scenarios from the history of their chosen country as the top team received a prize of a four-day trip to the then-new Euro Disney.

Through Flextech, TCC was a co-producer of cartoons in its later years, notably including Earthworm Jim.

== See also ==
- List of European television stations
- Timeline of cable television in the United Kingdom
