= List of former TV channels in the United Kingdom =

This is a list of former TV channels in the United Kingdom.

EPG numbers are displayed in the columns to the left under the relevant service names.

== Analogue ==
ATT	British Satellite Broadcasting	Sky Television/Sky Multichannels	Analogue cable	Channel name	Owner/parent company at the time	Date shutdown	Reason
—N/a	—N/a	—N/a		Bristol Channel	Rediffusion	1975-03-14	Bristol only.
—N/a	—N/a	—N/a		Wellingborough Cablevision	Wellingborough Traders Television Relay	1975-03-24	Wellingborough only.
—N/a	—N/a	—N/a		Sheffield Cablevision	British Relay Wireless	1976-01-02	Sheffield only.
—N/a	—N/a	—N/a		Greenwich Cablevision	Greenwich Cablevision Ltd	c.1983	Greenwich only. Volunteer-run in later years.
—N/a	—N/a	—N/a		Swindon Viewpoint	EMI and Radio Rentals	1980	Swindon only. Closed as staffed operation in 1980, continued volunteer run til present day
—N/a	—N/a	—N/a		Channel 40	Milton Keynes Development Corporation, Post Office Telecommunications	1979	Milton Keynes only. Replaced with Cable Radio Milton Keynes.
—N/a	—N/a	—N/a		Avon TV		1981	Bristol only.
—N/a	—N/a	—N/a		T.E.N. (The Entertainment Network)	Rediffusion, Visionhire, Plessey, Rank Organisation	1985-06-02	Replaced with Mirrorvision.
—N/a	—N/a	—N/a	202	Mirrorvision	Mirror Group Newspapers	1986-04-01	Merged with Premiere.
—N/a	—N/a			Music Box	Virgin Vision	1987-01-30	Replaced by Super Channel
—N/a	—N/a	—N/a		Star Channel	British Telecommunications plc	1987	Merged with Premiere
—N/a	—N/a	—N/a		Premiere	Maxwell Communications Corporation, Goldcrest Films, HBO, Showtime	1989/07
—N/a	—N/a			The Arts Channel	Sky Television plc	1989
—N/a		—N/a	—N/a	The Computer Channel	BSkyB	1990-11-29
—N/a		—N/a	—N/a	Now	BSkyB	1990-12-01	Transponder space handed to Sky News.
—N/a		—N/a	—N/a	Galaxy	BSkyB	1990-12-02	Transponder space handed to Sky One.
—N/a		—N/a	—N/a	The Power Station	BSkyB	1991-04-08	Transponder space handed to Sky Movies.
—N/a	—N/a		—N/a	The Comedy Channel	BSkyB	1992-09-30	Replaced with Sky Movies Gold.
—N/a		—N/a	—N/a	Sky Arts	BSkyB	1992-12-31	Marcopolo satellites sold and signals shut, returned on December 2, 2000, as Artsworld on Sky Digital which then became Sky Arts On March 1, 2007.
—N/a	—N/a			Lifestyle	W H Smith	1993-01-24	Astra transponder 5 becomes Vox
—N/a	—N/a			Lifestyle Satellite Jukebox	W H Smith	1993-01-24	Astra transponder 5 becomes Vox
—N/a	—N/a			Screensport	W H Smith & ESPN	1993-03-01	Merged with Eurosport. Transponder space bought to RTL2.
—N/a	—N/a		—N/a	TV Asia	Dolphin Group	1995-03-01	Sold to Zee Entertainment Enterprises. Replaced with Zee TV.
—N/a	—N/a	—N/a		Wire TV	Mirror Television	1995-05-31	Replaced by L!VE TV.
—N/a	—N/a	—N/a		The Identity Channel	BET Networks (Viacom)	1996	Financial problems.
—N/a		—N/a	—N/a	Sky Sports Gold	Sky UK	1996-08-16
—N/a	—N/a	—N/a		SelecTV	SelecTV plc	1997-02-14	Sold to Carlton Communications, rebranded as Carlton Select.
—N/a	—N/a		—N/a	Granada Talk TV	Granada Sky Broadcasting (GSB)	1997-08-31
—N/a	—N/a		—N/a	Sky 2	BSkyB	1997-08-31	Transponder space handed to National Geographic Channel. Returned as Sky One Mix on Digital on December 9, 2002.
—N/a	—N/a	—N/a		West Herts TV	Telecential	1997	Hemel Hempstead only.
—N/a	—N/a		—N/a	CMT Europe	Gaylord Entertainment Company	1998-03-31
—N/a	—N/a			The Children's Channel	United Artists Programming Ltd	1998-04-03
—N/a	—N/a			The Weather Channel	IWP	1998/04
—N/a	—N/a		—N/a	Sky Scottish	BSkyB, SMG plc	1998-05-31	Closed because it fails to meet its financial targets.
—N/a	—N/a	—N/a		Channel One	Associated Newspapers	1998-09-02	London only.
—N/a	—N/a	—N/a		Channel One West	Associated Newspapers	1998-09-21	Bristol only.
—N/a	—N/a			NBC Europe	General Electric	1998
—N/a	—N/a		—N/a	Sky Soap	BSkyB	1999-04-30	Transponder space handed to extra 4 hours of The History Channel
—N/a	—N/a	—N/a		L!VE TV	Mirror Group Newspapers	1999-10-31	Returned in 2003.
—N/a	—N/a	—N/a		Swindon Cable	NTL	2000/06	Swindon only.
—N/a	—N/a			TNT	Turner Broadcasting System Europe (Time Warner)	2000-07-01	Transponder space replaced with Turner Classic Movies.
UHF 48	—N/a	—N/a	—N/a	Lanarkshire TV	Thistle Technology Group Ltd	2001	Lanarkshire only. Replaced By Thistle TV
UHF 66	—N/a	—N/a	—N/a	TV Local Bristol	Local Broadcasting Group (Einstein Channel plc)	2002/10	Bristol only. Financial difficulties.
UHF 49	—N/a	—N/a	—N/a	Channel Six Dundee	Channel 6 Broadcasting Ltd	2002	Dundee only. problems.
—N/a	—N/a	—N/a		3sat	ZDF, ORF, SRG SSR idée suisse, ARD	2002
—N/a	—N/a	—N/a		Rai Uno	RAI	2002
—N/a	—N/a	—N/a		Rai Due	RAI	2002
—N/a	—N/a	—N/a		RTL Television	RTL Group	2002
—N/a	—N/a	—N/a		Sat.1	ProSiebenSat.1 Media	2002
UHF 52	—N/a	—N/a	—N/a	Herts TV	Local Broadcasting Group (Einstein Channel plc)	2002	Hertford and Ware only. Financial problems.
—N/a	—N/a	—N/a		NTL Cable 7	NTL	2002
—N/a	—N/a	—N/a		Taunton TV	TV Local	2002	Taunton and Wellington only.
UHF 54	—N/a	—N/a	—N/a	TV12	TV12 ltd	2002	Isle of Wight only.
UHF 52	—N/a	—N/a	—N/a	Edinburgh Television	TV Local	2003	Edinburgh only.
UHF 29	—N/a	—N/a	—N/a	Portsmouth TV	MyTV Network Limited	2004-03-19	Portsmouth only. Entered administration.
UHF 29/55	—N/a	—N/a	—N/a	Southampton TV	MyTV Network Limited	2004-03-19	Southampton only. Entered administration.
UHF 33	—N/a	—N/a		Northants TV	Midlands Cable TV	2004	Northampton only.
UHF 48	—N/a	—N/a	—N/a	Thistle TV	Thistle Television Ltd	2005-05-17	Signal problems. Lanarkshire only.
UHF 54	—N/a	—N/a	—N/a	Solent TV	Island Volunteers Group	2007-05-24	Isle of Wight only. Nationally available on Sky.
—N/a	—N/a	—N/a		Hellenic TV	Hellenic Television Ltd	2008-12-17
UHF 48/21	—N/a	—N/a	—N/a	C9TV	U C Business Ltd	2008	Coleraine, Derry and Limavady only.
UHF 47/29/55	—N/a	—N/a	—N/a	Six TV	Six TV Broadcasting (Milestone Group)	2009	Oxford and Southampton only. Failed to secure a guaranteed digital channel.
UHF 49	—N/a	—N/a	—N/a	Capital TV	Capital TV Ltd	2009	Cardiff only.
UHF 54	—N/a	—N/a	—N/a	York@54	EBS New Media	2011	York only.
—N/a	—N/a	—N/a		JSTV	NHK Cosmomedia (Europe) Limited	2012-01-31
UHF 62	—N/a	—N/a	—N/a	NVTV	Northern Visions Limited	2012-10-23	Belfast only.

== Digital ==
=== Year ===
==== 1999 ====
DTT	Sky	Telewest	Channel name	Owner/parent company at the time	Date shutdown	Reason
—N/a	142	—N/a	Sky Soap	BSkyB	1999-04-30	Poor viewing figures following the launch of Sky Digital.

==== 2000 ====
DTT	Sky	NTL	Telewest	Channel name	Owner/parent company at the time	Date shutdown	Reason
34	—N/a	—N/a	—N/a	Carlton Kids	Carlton Communications plc	2000-02-01	Timeshared with Carlton World. Replaced by Discovery Kids.
34	—N/a	—N/a	—N/a	Carlton World	Carlton Communications plc	2000-02-01	Timeshared with Carlton Kids. Replaced by Discovery Wings.
35	—N/a	121	—N/a	Carlton Select	Carlton Communications plc	2000-03-01	Timeshared with Carlton Food Network. The closure allows Carlton Food Network's hours to be extended via OnDigital, and on cable it is replaced by Carlton Cinema.
45	—N/a	—N/a	—N/a	Games Channel		2000-06-08	Replaced with ONGames 1
20	—N/a	—N/a	—N/a	ONDigital Information	ONDigital	2000 (Summer/Autumn)	Replaced with ONView

==== 2001 ====
DTT	Sky	NTL	Telewest	Channel name	Owner/parent company at the time	Date shutdown	Reason
—N/a	678	—N/a	—N/a	Alpha TV Bangla	Asia TV Ltd	2001-02-07	Replaced with Zee Cinema
—N/a	966	—N/a	—N/a	BBC Choice Northern Ireland	BBC	2001-03-31	Replaced by a digital version of BBC Two Northern Ireland.
—N/a	964	—N/a	—N/a	BBC Choice Scotland	BBC	2001-03-31	Replaced by a digital version of BBC Two Scotland.
—N/a	965	—N/a	—N/a	BBC Choice Wales	BBC	2001-03-31	Replaced by BBC 2W.
—N/a	—N/a	—N/a	141	SceneOne	Flextech	2001/03	Repositioned as a T-commerce hub.
43	522	—N/a	—N/a	Simply Money	Invest TV	2001-04-16	Replaced with Simply Shopping on Sky.
—N/a	441	610/94	307	MTV Extra	MTV Networks Europe	2001-05-01	Replaced with MTV Hits.
—N/a	516	—N/a	614	The Money Channel	The Money Channel plc	2001-05-06	Financial problems.
—N/a	952	—N/a	—N/a	Automotive Channel	BSkyB	2001/05
47	—N/a	—N/a	—N/a	ONOffer	ONdigital	2001 (Spring/Summer)	ITV Digital EPG slot bought by Wellbeing
46	—N/a	—N/a	—N/a	ONGames 2	ONdigital	2001 (Spring/Summer)
45	—N/a	—N/a	—N/a	ONGames 1	ONdigital	2001-07-11	Replaced with Two Way TV
—N/a	688	—N/a	—N/a	Channel East	Channel East	2001-07-23	Financial problems resulting in loss of satellite uplink
6	—N/a	117/6	113	S2	SMG plc	2001-07-27	Replaced with ITV2 and ITV Sport Channel. Scotland only.
—N/a	799	—N/a	—N/a	U>Direct Films previews	Digital Broadcasting Company	2001-07-31	Went into liquidation.
—N/a	800–816	—N/a	—N/a	U>Direct Films	Digital Broadcasting Company	2001-07-31	Went into liquidation.
—N/a	823–824	—N/a	—N/a	B4U>Direct	Digital Broadcasting Company & B4U	2001-08-01	Went into liquidation.
—N/a	432	—N/a	—N/a	U>Direct Sports	Digital Broadcasting Company	2001-08-01	Went into liquidation.
—N/a	—N/a	725	—N/a	Lions TV	Premium TV (NTL)	2001/08	Temporary channel for the 2001 British Lions tour to Australia.
—N/a	999	—N/a	—N/a	Sky Latest	BSkyB	2001-08-20	Replaced with Sky Customer Channel.
—N/a	567	—N/a	—N/a	.tv	BSkyB	2001-09-02	Low audience ratings and failed contract negotiations for carriage on cable.
—N/a	202	—N/a	—N/a	Liberty TV	M7 Television plc	2001-10-05	Replaced with Life TV
—N/a	461	—N/a	—N/a	Whereits.at TV	David Rose	2001-10-10	Financial difficulties.
35	—N/a	303/115	297	Taste CFN	Carlton Communications plc	2001-11-30	Ceased broadcasting due to failed contract negotiations for carriage on Sky. ITV Digital slot replaced with ITV Digital Preview.
—N/a	698	—N/a	—N/a	MBI	MBI Minaj Broadcast International	2001-12-06
46	—N/a	—N/a	—N/a	Two Way TV		2001-12-31
47	211	—N/a	—N/a	Wellbeing	Granada & Boots Group	2001-12-31

==== 2002 ====
DTT	Sky	NTL	Telewest	Channel name	Owner/parent company at the time	Date shutdown	Reason
6	—N/a	117/6	—N/a	UTV2	UTV Media	2002-01-22	Replaced with ITV2. Northern Ireland only.
—N/a	682	—N/a	—N/a	Asia 1 TV	Asia 1 TV Limited (Reminiscent TV Network)	2002-02-04	Financial difficulties.
—N/a	691	—N/a	—N/a	Lashkara TV	Reminiscent TV Network	2002-02-04	Financial problems.
—N/a	683	—N/a	—N/a	Sonali TV	Reminiscent TV Network	2002-02-06	Financial problems.
—N/a	681	—N/a	—N/a	UC Lanka	UC Lanka Ltd	2002-02-21
—N/a	692	—N/a	—N/a	Gurjari	Reminiscent TV Network	2002-02-22	Financial problems.
—N/a	693	—N/a	—N/a	CEE(i)TV	Reminiscent TV Network	2002-02-22	Financial problems. Returned on 8 April 2002.
—N/a	694	—N/a	—N/a	Anjuman TV	Reminiscent TV Network	2002-02-22	Financial problems.
16	—N/a	—N/a	—N/a	ITV Text +	ITV Digital	2002/02
13	573	127/13	245	BBC Knowledge	BBC	2002-03-02	Replaced with BBC Four and CBeebies.
19	633	634	867	Shop!	Granada & Littlewoods	2002-04-08	ITV Digital slot given to QVC
51	—N/a	—N/a	—N/a	ITV Select 1	ITV Digital	2002-04-22	Closed by ITV Digital after going into administration
52	—N/a	—N/a	—N/a	ITV Select 2	ITV Digital	2002-04-22	Closed by ITV Digital after going into administration
53	—N/a	—N/a	—N/a	ITV Select 3	ITV Digital	2002-04-22	Closed by ITV Digital after going into administration
54	—N/a	—N/a	—N/a	ITV Select 4	ITV Digital	2002-04-22	Closed by ITV Digital after going into administration
55	—N/a	—N/a	—N/a	ITV Select 5	ITV Digital	2002-04-22	Closed by ITV Digital after going into administration
56	—N/a	—N/a	—N/a	For Adults Only 1	ITV Digital	2002-04-22
57	—N/a	—N/a	—N/a	For Adults Only 2	ITV Digital	2002-04-22
58	—N/a	—N/a	—N/a	For Adults Only 3	ITV Digital	2002-04-22
—N/a	—N/a	405/114	—N/a	Granada Breeze	Granada Sky Broadcasting (GSB)	2002-04-30
—N/a	178	306	160	Tara Television	Raidió Teilifís Éireann & United Pan-Europe Communications	2002-04-30	Wound up by the High Court in April 2002.
98	—N/a	111/729	—N/a	ITV Sport Select	ITV Digital	2002/04	Closed by ITV Digital after going into administration.
99	—N/a	—N/a	—N/a	ITV Sport Plus	ITV Digital	2002/04	Closed by ITV Digital after going into administration.
35	—N/a	—N/a	—N/a	ITV Digital Preview	ITV Digital	2002-05-01	Removed after ITV Digital ceased broadcasting.
47	—N/a	—N/a	—N/a	ITV Select Previews	ITV Digital	2002-05-01	Removed after ITV Digital ceased broadcasting.
50	—N/a	—N/a	—N/a	ITV Select Information	ITV Digital	2002-05-01	Removed after ITV Digital ceased broadcasting.
88	—N/a	—N/a	—N/a	ITV Digital Information	ITV Digital	2002-05-01	Removed after ITV Digital ceased broadcasting.
20	—N/a	727	—N/a	ITV Sport Channel	ITV Digital	2002-05-12	Removed after ITV Digital ceased broadcasting.
—N/a	673	—N/a	—N/a	Inspiration Network	Mission Today Ltd	2002-06-01	Financial problems.
—N/a	878	—N/a	—N/a	ITN Radio	ITN	2002-06-01	Financial problems.
—N/a		—N/a	—N/a	Bright Blue	Energis	2002-06-15	Financial problems.
—N/a	576	—N/a	—N/a	Einstein.tv	Einstein Channel plc	2002-07-24	Financial problems. Sky EPG slot bought by Chart Show TV. Returned by Simply Television on 28 November 2002 as Simply Einstein.
—N/a	910	—N/a	—N/a	TEAMtalk 252	TEAMtalk Media Group plc	2002-07-31	Financial problems.
—N/a	464	—N/a	—N/a	Digital Classics TV	Digital Classics plc	2002-08-08	Financial problems.
—N/a	455	—N/a	—N/a	Vibe TV	Eagle Road Studios Ltd	2002-09-02	Replaced with TV High Street on 9 September 2002.
—N/a	217	607/100	151	Play UK	UKTV (BBC Worldwide/Flextech)	2002-09-30	Replaced with UK History on 30 October 2002.
—N/a	644	—N/a	—N/a	Home Shopping Europe	Home Shopping Network	2002-10-01	Financial problems. This was later bought by Sirius Retail Television and, soon after, replaced with Shop USA.
—N/a	816	—N/a	—N/a	Sirasa TV	Culture Vision Ltd	2002-10-28
—N/a	657	—N/a	—N/a	Shop Aid TV	MVI Broadcasting Ltd	2002-10-31
—N/a	871	—N/a	—N/a	Youth FM		2002-12-31
—N/a	—N/a	118	—N/a	The Studio	NTL and Vivendi Universal	2002-12-31	Financial problems and failed contract negotiations for carriage on Sky and Telewest.
—N/a	—N/a	—N/a	625	Channel One	Channel One Liverpool Ltd (DMGT)	2002	Liverpool only. Financial problems.
—N/a	434	—N/a	—N/a	F1 Digital+	Formula One Management	2002/12	Financial problems.
—N/a	—N/a	608/71	—N/a	BET on Jazz	BET Networks (Viacom)	2002	Carriage agreement not renewed.

==== 2003 ====
DTT	Sky	NTL	Telewest	Channel name	Owner/parent company at the time	Date shutdown	Reason
—N/a	410	—N/a	—N/a	The Racing Channel	Satellite Information Services (The Racing Network International)	2003-02-03
—N/a	193	803	—N/a	Channel Health	Channel Health Ltd.	2003-02-05	Financial problems.
7	160	126/12	111	BBC Choice	BBC	2003-02-09	Replaced with BBC Three.
—N/a	817	—N/a	—N/a	South For You	South For You Limited	2003-02-21	Technical problem after changing transponders. Returned on 3 March 2003.
—N/a	889	—N/a	—N/a	The Scene		2003-03-09
—N/a	665	—N/a	—N/a	Chart Shop TV	CSC Media Group	2003-03-12	Replaced with Video Vault.
—N/a	644	—N/a	—N/a	Shop USA	Sirius Retail Television	2003-03-18	Sky EPG slot bought by TV Warehouse Select, TV Warehouse moved to 644 and Shop Genie moved to 646.
—N/a	952	—N/a	—N/a	CPD / Dental TV	CPD Dental TV Limited	2003-03-25
—N/a	—N/a	309/49	425	Carlton Cinema	Carlton Communications plc	2003-03-31	Ceased broadcasting due to failed contract negotiations for carriage on Sky.
—N/a	906	—N/a	—N/a	Rampage	Radio First	2003/03
—N/a	645	—N/a	—N/a	Simply Music	Simply Media	2003-04-14	Replaced with Simply Shop+.
—N/a	579	—N/a	—N/a	Simply Nature	Simply Media	2003-04-14
—N/a	581	—N/a	—N/a	Simply Einstein	Simply Media (Simply Einstein Ltd)	2003-04-14
—N/a	905	—N/a	—N/a	Relax with a Book Radio	Relax with a Book	2003/04
—N/a	262	—N/a	—N/a	Simply Nostalgia	Simply Media	2003-05-01	Financial difficulties.
—N/a	645	—N/a	—N/a	Simply Shop+	Simply Media	2003-05-01	Financial problems.
—N/a	826	—N/a	—N/a	Simply Asian	Simply Media	2003-05-01	Financial problems.
—N/a	326	715/47	—N/a	FilmFour Extreme	Channel Four Television Corporation	2003-05-05	Timeshared with FilmFour World. Replaced with FilmFour Weekly.
—N/a	325	716/48	—N/a	FilmFour World	Channel Four Television Corporation	2003-05-05	Timeshared with FilmFour Extreme. Replaced with FilmFour Weekly.
—N/a	305	708/55	405	Sky Movies Premier Widescreen	BSkyB	2003-06-03	Ceased broadcasting due to widescreen content being broadcast on all other Sky Movies channels.
—N/a	414	—N/a	—N/a	Red Button Races	gobarkingmad Ltd	2003-06-18	Financial problems.
—N/a	822	—N/a	—N/a	ART Europe	Arab Radio and Television Network	2003-06-25	Replaced with MBC.
—N/a	627	—N/a	—N/a	Toons and Tunes	CSC Media Group	2003-06-26	Replaced with Pop.
—N/a	985	—N/a	—N/a	Red Hot Euro	RHF Productions Ltd (Northern & Shell)	2003-06-30	Replaced with Red Hot 40+.
—N/a	913	—N/a	—N/a	Apna Radio		2003-07-24	Financial problems.
52	—N/a	—N/a	—N/a	NTL Interactive	NTL	2003 (Summer)	MHEG electronic programme guide, with listings for ITV Digital channels.
—N/a	461	—N/a	—N/a	P-Rock	P-Rock TV Ltd	2003-08-03	Financial problems.
22	—N/a	—N/a	—N/a	CBM	CBM Media	2003-08-06	Channel never launched due to CBM failing to meet the contract launch conditions.
—N/a	814	—N/a	—N/a	Ekushey TV	Ekushey Television (Pvt) Ltd.	2003-09-01	Licensing problems in Bangladesh.
—N/a	247	—N/a	—N/a	MBE (Major Black Entertainment)	BKA Television Ltd	2003-09-03	Space used for Classics TV
—N/a	244	903	148	CNX	Turner Broadcasting System Europe (Time Warner)	2003-09-08	Replaced with Toonami.
—N/a	978	—N/a	—N/a	Red Hot Films	RHF Productions Ltd (Northern & Shell)	2003-09-21	Replaced with Red Hot Only 18.
—N/a	774	—N/a	—N/a	Erotika 4	RHF Productions Ltd (Northern & Shell)	2003-10-16	Replaced with Television X 2.
—N/a	775	—N/a	—N/a	Erotika 5	RHF Productions Ltd (Northern & Shell)	2003-10-16	Replaced with Television X 3.
—N/a	776	—N/a	—N/a	Erotika 6	RHF Productions Ltd (Northern & Shell)	2003-10-16
—N/a	689	—N/a	—N/a	TX1	Euro Digital Corporation Ltd.	2003-10-30	Capacity used by GayDateTV
—N/a	984	—N/a	—N/a	Pout Uncut	Digital Television Production Ltd	2003-11-20	Replaced with Xplicit XXX
—N/a	675	—N/a	—N/a	CTC	M7 Television plc	2003-12-15
50	—N/a	—N/a	—N/a	FourText	Intelfax	2003-12-16	Replaced with Teletext on 4.
—N/a	691	—N/a	—N/a	Mobile Crazy TV	Mobile Crazy TV	2003-12-24	Financial problems.

==== 2004 ====
DTT	Sky	NTL	Telewest	Channel name	Owner/parent company at the time	Date shutdown	Reason
—N/a	772	—N/a	—N/a	Erotika 2	RHF Productions Ltd (Northern & Shell)	2004-02-02
—N/a	773	—N/a	—N/a	Erotika 3	RHF Productions Ltd (Northern & Shell)	2004-02-02
—N/a	771	—N/a	—N/a	Erotika 1	RHF Productions Ltd (Northern & Shell)	2004-03-01
—N/a	564	137/506	225	UK Horizons	UKTV (BBC Worldwide/Flextech)	2004-03-08	Split into UKTV Documentary and UKTV People, with the former taking its former EPG slot.
—N/a	565	809	226	UK Horizons +1	UKTV (BBC Worldwide/Flextech)	2004-03-08	Replaced with UKTV Documentary +1 (Sky/Telewest)/UKTV People (NTL)
—N/a	418	909	534	Attheraces	Channel Four Television Corporation	2004-03-29	Financial problems. Returned on 11 June 2004 without Channel Four.
—N/a	669	—N/a	—N/a	Going Places TV	My Travel plc	2004-05-06	Financial problems.
—N/a	666	—N/a	—N/a	AuctionWorld Reserve	Auctionworld Ltd	2004-05-08	Replaced with Chase-it.tv.
—N/a	—N/a	—N/a	933	Century Radio	Capital Radio Group	2004-06-29	Removed in favour of national carriage of Century Digital. Gateshead regional headend only.
—N/a	686	—N/a	—N/a	txt me	Sirius Retail Television	2004-07-01	Replaced with The Soundtrack Channel.
—N/a	620	—N/a	—N/a	Pop Plus	CSC Media Group	2004-07-27	Replaced with Tiny Pop.
—N/a	878	—N/a	—N/a	Student Broadcast Network	Campus Media	2004-09-23	Financial problems.
—N/a	844	—N/a	—N/a	Bollywood Films	Red Hot Films	2004-09-23	Low subscriber numbers.
—N/a	820	—N/a	—N/a	ART Movies	Arab Radio and Television Network	2004-10-01	Low subscriber numbers.
—N/a	821	—N/a	—N/a	ART Music	Arab Radio and Television Network	2004-10-01	Low subscriber numbers.
—N/a	822	—N/a	—N/a	MBC	Arab Radio and Television Network	2004-10-01	Low subscriber numbers.
—N/a	823	—N/a	—N/a	LBC	Arab Radio and Television Network	2004-10-01	Low subscriber numbers.
—N/a	425	—N/a	—N/a	iSports TV	Digital Interactive Television Group	2004-10-06	Replaced with Channel 425.
—N/a	663	—N/a	—N/a	Factory Outlet	Eagle Road Studios Limited	2004-10-08	Replaced with Gems TV.
—N/a	994	—N/a	—N/a	SportXXXGirls		2004-10-11	Replaced with XXX Housewives.
—N/a	637	—N/a	—N/a	Shop America	Shop America Ltd	2004-10-20	Sky EPG slot bought by Express Shopping Channel.
—N/a	118	101/301	128	Plus	Granada Sky Broadcasting	2004-11-01	Closed down by ITV plc and GSB as part of a deal to carry ITV3 on Sky. Replaced with ITV3.
—N/a	660	924	—N/a	Auction World.tv	Auctionworld Ltd	2004-11-19	Parent company forced into administration and licence revoked by Ofcom.
—N/a	649	—N/a	—N/a	Chase-it.tv	Auctionworld Ltd	2004-11-19	Parent company forced into administration and licence revoked by Ofcom.
—N/a	238	—N/a	—N/a	Bonanza		2004-12-06	Replaced with Majestic TV.
—N/a	656	—N/a	—N/a	Shop Smart	Shop Smart Television Ltd	2004-12-11	Licence revoked by Ofcom.
—N/a	681	—N/a	—N/a	Jobs TV		2004-12-23

==== 2005 ====
DTT	Sky	NTL	Telewest	Channel name	Owner/parent company at the time	Date shutdown	Reason
—N/a	413	811	525	Eurosport News	TF1 Group	2005-01-10	Replaced with Eurosport 2.
—N/a	675	—N/a	—N/a	CFC TV		2005-01-27	Sky EPG slot bought by Daystar.
—N/a	837	—N/a	—N/a	NSAT	NSAT Limited	2005-02-04	Financial problems.
—N/a	211	—N/a	—N/a	ACTV		2005-02-14
36	—N/a	—N/a	—N/a	Top Up TV Sampler	Top Up TV	2005/02	Replaced with Xtraview.
—N/a	428	—N/a	—N/a	TWC Re:Loaded	The Wrestling Channel Ltd.	2005-03-21	Slot bought by CSC Media Group. Ceased broadcasting for Movies 333.
56	—N/a	—N/a	—N/a	Teletext TV Guide	Teletext Ltd.	2005-03-23	Replaced with Teletext Cars
—N/a	981	—N/a	—N/a	Red Hot UK Talent	Portland TV	2005-04-01	Replaced with Red Hot Climax.
—N/a	982	—N/a	—N/a	Red Hot Euro	Portland TV	2005-04-01	Sky EPG slot bought by Red Hot Only 18.
—N/a	983	—N/a	—N/a	Red Hot Films	Portland TV	2005-04-01	Replaced with Red Hot Movies.
—N/a	829	—N/a	—N/a	SAB TV	Middlesex Broadcasting Corporation Ltd	2005-04-06	Replaced with MATV National. Programs moved to Sony Entertainment Television in June 2005 after SAB TV was taken over in India. Returned on 24 April 2008.
—N/a	631	115/23	870	TV Travel Shop	TV Travel Shop	2005-04-16	DTT allocation bought by Top Up TV in 2004. Sky EPG slot bought by iBuy.
—N/a	632	633	—N/a	TV Travel Shop 2	TV Travel Shop	2005-04-16	Sky EPG slot bought by iBuy2.
—N/a	149	—N/a	—N/a	Travel Channel 2	Travel Channel International Ltd.	2005-04-25	Replaced with Travel Channel +1. Returned on 11 February 2008.
—N/a	663	—N/a	—N/a	Snatch It!	Eagle Road Studios Limited	2005-05-12	Replaced with Gems TV 2.
—N/a	537	—N/a	—N/a	Vectone World	Vectone Media Limited	2005-05-26	Sky EPG slot bought by Vectone Music.
—N/a	—N/a	770	—N/a	Boro TV	NTL	2005/07	Teesside only.
—N/a	—N/a	771	—N/a	Boro TV Extra	NTL	2005/07	Teesside only.
36	—N/a	—N/a	—N/a	Xtraview	Top Up TV	2005-08-31	Space revoked by Channel 4 to launch More 4.
—N/a	696	—N/a	—N/a	Exchange & Mart TV	Digital Television Production Company Limited	2005-08-08
—N/a	814	—N/a	—N/a	Vectone Music	Vectone Media Limited	2005-09-02	Replaced with Vectone Channel i.
—N/a	241	—N/a	—N/a	The Soundtrack Channel	Sirius Retail Television	2005-09-05	Replaced with Action!241
—N/a	180	—N/a	—N/a	You TV 3	Trustar Global Media	2005-09-06	Returned on 4 October 2005 as You TV 2 Extra.
—N/a	747–754	—N/a	—N/a	Sky Box Office	BSkyB	2005-09-07	Sky Box Office immediately reshuffled their channel numbers.
—N/a	695	—N/a	—N/a	Authentic TV		2005-09-14	Replaced with Open Access.
—N/a	898	—N/a	—N/a	Big Blue Radio	Chelsea F.C.	2005-09-14
—N/a	259	—N/a	—N/a	Unlimited TV	Open Access Group Ltd	2005-09-30	Sky EPG slot bought by Audi Channel.
—N/a	636	—N/a	—N/a	Express Shopping Channel	Shop America TV	2005-10-03	Replaced with Pitch TV.
—N/a	696	—N/a	—N/a	Vectone Mall	Vectone Media Limited	2005-10-05	Sky EPG slot bought by Vectone Sinhla.
—N/a	247	—N/a	—N/a	Classics TV	On-Air Systems Ltd	2005-10-10	Replaced with Dove Vision.
—N/a	241	—N/a	—N/a	Action!241		2005-10-26	Replaced with Bonanza
—N/a	740	—N/a	—N/a	Sky Box Office	BSkyB	2005-11-27
—N/a	899	—N/a	—N/a	The Saint	Southampton FC	2005-12-01
81	525	123	617	ITV News Channel	ITV plc	2005-12-23	Replaced with ITV4 and CITV.
—N/a	827	—N/a	—N/a	ATN Global	Gujarat Television Limited	2005/12	Sky EPG slot bought by Venus TV.

==== 2006 ====
DTT	Sky	NTL:Telewest	Channel name	Owner/parent company at the time	Date shutdown	Reason
—N/a	647	—N/a	TelSell	Tel Sell BV	2006-01-09	Sky EPG slot bought by Pitch TV Plus.
—N/a	860	881/925	The Storm	GCap Media	2006-01-23	Replaced with Chill.
—N/a	336	—N/a	Matinee Movies	sit-up Ltd	2006-01-31	Bought by Dolphin Broadcast Services Ltd. Replaced with Movies4Men.
—N/a	339	—N/a	Bad Movies	sit-up Ltd	2006-01-31	Bought by Dolphin Broadcast Services Ltd. Replaced with ACTIONMAX.
—N/a	172	—N/a	Game Network	Cellcast Group	2006-02-20	Replaced with Babestation.
—N/a	871	882	The Mix	GCap Media	2006-02-20	Replaced with Fun Radio. Ex-NTL only.
—N/a	814	—N/a	Vectone Channel i	Vectone Media Limited	2006-02-20	Replaced with Vectone One.
—N/a	832	—N/a	Vectone MH1	Vectone Media Limited	2006-02-20	Replaced with Vectone Two.
—N/a	694	—N/a	Your Destiny TV		2006-02-20	Replaced with Broadband World TV 2.
—N/a	214	—N/a	L!VE TV	Mirror Group Newspapers	2006-02-28	Replaced with Babeworld.
—N/a	362	933	The Amp	BSkyB	2006-03-01	Replaced with Bliss
—N/a	602	614/705	Cartoon Network +1	Turner Broadcasting System Europe (Time Warner)	2006-03-06	Replaced with Boomerang +1. Relaunched on 1 April 2014.
—N/a	277	—N/a	London TV	Visit London	2006-03-14	Replaced with Celebrity Shopping.
—N/a	613	698/65/726	Toon Disney	Disney-ABC Television Group	2006-03-16	Replaced with Disney Cinemagic
—N/a	640	—N/a	Superstore TV	Simply Media	2006-04-03	Sky EPG slot bought by The Jewellery Channel.
—N/a	541	—N/a	UKTV People +1	UKTV (BBC Worldwide/Flextech)	2006-04-18	Replaced with UKTV Drama +1 on 2 May 2006.
—N/a	818	—N/a	ATN Bangla	Multimedia Production Company	2006-05-06	Returned on 6 September 2006 when acquired by Channel S.
—N/a	0167	—N/a	Jazz FM	GMG Radio	2006-05-06
—N/a	0163	—N/a	Apple FM		2006-05-25
—N/a	0132	871	PrimeTime Radio	Roger De Haan	2006-06-02	Ex-NTL only.
—N/a	852	—N/a	Quiz TV	Quiz TV Limited	2006-06-23
106	—N/a	—N/a	YooPlay Games	YooMedia	2006-07-18	Replaced with Virgin Radio.
—N/a	317	715/47	FilmFour Weekly	Channel Four Television Corporation	2006-07-19	Ceased broadcasting when the subscription service ended. Ex-NTL only.
—N/a	822	—N/a	DM Gold	DM Digital Television Ltd	2006-07-24	Replaced by DM Islam.
—N/a	672	—N/a	GDTV	One TV plc	2006/07	Financial problems.
—N/a	667	—N/a	One TV	One TV plc	2006/07	Financial problems. Licence revoked by Ofcom.
—N/a	346	172/315	VH2	MTV Networks Europe	2006-08-01	Replaced with MTV Flux.
—N/a	886	—N/a	Majestic TV	Canis Channel Management Limited	2006-08-08	Replaced with Psychic Interactive TV
—N/a	674	—N/a	Treasures.tv	Treasures TV Limited	2006-08-17
—N/a	440	—N/a	SportsNation	Canis Media	2006/08
—N/a	202	141	Trouble Reload	Flextech	2006-09-09	Replaced with Trouble +1.
—N/a	771	—N/a	Dove Vision	Dove Vision (UK) Ltd	2006-09-15
—N/a	799	—N/a	Al Jazeera Arabic	Al Jazeera Media Network	2006-09-29
—N/a	841	—N/a	Avago	YooMedia	2006-10-04	Replaced with Gala TV.
—N/a	327	—N/a	ACTIONMAX	Dolphin Broadcast Services Ltd	2006-10-09	Replaced with Movies4Men 2.
—N/a	0204	—N/a	Virgin Radio Party Classics	SMG plc	2006/10
—N/a	786	—N/a	Vectone Urdu	Vectone Media Limited	2006-11-10
—N/a	794	—N/a	Vectone One	Vectone Media Limited	2006-11-10
—N/a	796	—N/a	Vectone Tamil	Vectone Media Limited	2006-11-10
—N/a	800	—N/a	Vectone Bangla	Vectone Media Limited	2006-11-10
—N/a	803	—N/a	Vectone Punjab	Vectone Media Limited	2006-11-10
—N/a	811	—N/a	Vectone Sinhla	Vectone Media Limited	2006-11-10
—N/a	812	—N/a	Vectone Two	Vectone Media Limited	2006-11-10
—N/a	512	820	South Asia World	Asia TV Ltd	2006-11-11	Ex-Telewest only.
—N/a	821	—N/a	Vectone 2U	Vectone Media Limited	2006-11-24
504	—N/a	—N/a	Channel 4 HD	Channel Four Television Corporation	2006-11-30	Crystal Palace only. Returned on 10 December 2007.
505	—N/a	—N/a	Five HD	Channel 5 Broadcasting (RTL Group)	2006-11-30	Crystal Palace only. Returned on 13 July 2010.
503	—N/a	118	ITV HD	ITV plc	2006-11-30	Crystal Palace and ex-Telewest only. Returned on 7 June 2008.
—N/a	0113	961	Century Digital	GMG Radio	2006-12-14	Station sold to GMG Radio, EPG slots retained by GCap Media and given to theJazz.

==== 2007 ====
DTT	Sky	Virgin TV	Channel name	Owner/parent company at the time	Date shutdown	Reason
—N/a	854	—N/a	Channel 854	William Hill plc & YooMedia	2007-01-03
—N/a	444	—N/a	All In Sport	Poker Channel Limited	2007-01-03
—N/a	916	—N/a	Look4Love	Television Concepts Limited	2007/01	Licence revoked by Ofcom.
—N/a	918	—N/a	Look 4 Love 2	Television Concepts Limited	2007/01	Went into liquidation. Licence revoked by Ofcom.
—N/a	638	—N/a	Price Busters TV	MK Promotions	2007-02-22
—N/a	681	—N/a	Price Busters TV 2	MK Promotions	2007-02-22
—N/a	524	221	Discovery Wings	Discovery Networks UK	2007-02-28	Replaced with Discovery Turbo.
—N/a	615	721	Discovery Kids	Discovery Networks UK	2007-02-28	Replaced with Discovery Turbo.
—N/a	528	228/231	Adventure One	NGC-UK Partnership (National Geographic Society/Fox International Channels)	2007-03-01	Replaced with National Geographic Wild.
43	—N/a	—N/a	Top Up TV Promo	Top Up TV	2007-03-01	Replaced with Setanta Sports 1.
—N/a	913	—N/a	You TV 2	Trustar Global Media	2007-03-01
—N/a	659	—N/a	EeZee tv	eeZee tv Limited	2007-03-03	Replaced with JML Direct TV
107	—N/a	—N/a	Top Up TV Active	Top Up TV	2007-03-05
31	856	—N/a	ITV Play	ITV plc	2007-03-13	Ceased broadcasting due to phone-in fraud scandal. Replaced with ITV2 +1 on Freeview.
—N/a	372	—N/a	Just Fabulous	Just Fabulous (UK) Limited	2007-03-13
—N/a	193	—N/a	Rapture TV	Rapture Television plc	2007-03-19	Ceased broadcasting on Sky following EPG fees dispute.
724	—N/a	—N/a	3C	EMAP	2007-03-24
102	—N/a	—N/a	Teletext Cars	Teletext Ltd.	2007-04-02
—N/a	330	—N/a	More 24	NBC Universal Global Networks	2007-04-02	Replaced with Movies 24 +.
—N/a	929	—N/a	Red Hot Climax	RHF Productions Ltd (Northern and Shell)	2007-04-03
—N/a	931	—N/a	Red Hot Reality	RHF Productions Ltd (Northern and Shell)	2007-04-03
—N/a	221	—N/a	Trends TV	Trends TV Limited	2007-04-17
—N/a	849	—N/a	The Daily Quiz!	Big Game TV	2007-04-25
—N/a	809	—N/a	Apna Bazaar	Apna Bazaar Group	2007-04-30
—N/a	840	—N/a	The Great Big British Quiz	Play To Win TV	2007-05-04
—N/a	483	—N/a	PremPlus HD	BSkyB	2007-05-06	Match rights transferred to Setanta Sports and ceased broadcasting. Replaced with Sky Sports HDX.
—N/a	602	732	Toonami	Turner Broadcasting System Europe (Time Warner)	2007-05-24	Replaced with new version of Cartoon Network Too along with launch of Cartoonito.
—N/a	219	—N/a	Solent TV	Island Volunteers Group	2007-05-24
—N/a	483	—N/a	Sky Sports HDX	BSkyB	2007-05-26	Temporary channel.
—N/a	631	—N/a	IBuy	IAC/HSN	2007-05-28	Replaced with JML Direct TV.
—N/a	632	—N/a	IBuy 2	IAC/HSN	2007-05-28	Replaced with Shop Now TV.
—N/a	842	—N/a	Quiznation	Optimistic Entertainment	2007-05-31
—N/a	677	—N/a	Deal TV	Deal TV Ltd	2007/05
—N/a	825	—N/a	Unity Muslim TV	Unity Muslim Ltd	2007/06
—N/a	0112	923	Core Radio	GCap Media	2007-07-03
—N/a	0174	925	Chill	GCap Media	2007-07-03	Returned on 3 November 2008.
—N/a	158	—N/a	Bonanza	Optimistic Network Limited	2007-07-20	Replaced with Film 24 on the same day.
—N/a	819	—N/a	ARY OneWorld	ARY Group	2007-07-26	Returned on 22 December 2007.
—N/a	0175	960	Capital Disney	GCap Media	2007-07-29
—N/a	0109	919	Classic Gold	GCap Media	2007-08-03	Replaced by Gold after merger with Capital Gold.
—N/a	0123	859	Capital Gold	GCap Media	2007-08-03	Replaced by Gold after merger with Classic Gold.
—N/a	191	—N/a	GNTV	Lord Production Inc.	2007-08-06	Returned as Peace TV on 6 October 2007.
—N/a	—N/a	890	Info Zone	Virgin Media	2007-08-14	Replaced with PIN Protection Help. Ex-Telewest only.
—N/a	135	—N/a	Life TV	Life TV Media	2007-08-20	Ceased broadcasting for Channel 4 +1.
—N/a	136	—N/a	Life 24	Life TV Media	2007-08-20	Ceased broadcasting for Channel 4 HD.
—N/a	137	—N/a	Life Showcase TV	Life TV Media	2007-08-20	Ceased broadcasting for Film4 +1.
—N/a	194	—N/a	BEN 2	Greener Technology Limited	2007-08-28
—N/a	826	—N/a	Channel S NTV	Channel S Plus Ltd	2007-08-28	A fire broke out at the channel's headquarters in Bangladesh on February 26, which allowed the channel to broadcast reruns of shows. Sky EPG slot bought by Channel i. Returned on 19 July 2008.
—N/a	480	501	PremPlus	BSkyB	2007-09-11	Match rights transferred to Setanta Sports and ceased broadcasting.
—N/a	—N/a	502	PremPlus 2	BSkyB	2007-09-11	Match rights transferred to Setanta Sports and ceased broadcasting. Ex-NTL only.
—N/a	848	—N/a	Jackpot TV	Portland TV Ltd	2007-09-18
15	170	161	ABC1	Disney-ABC Television Group	2007-09-26	Replaced with Playhouse Disney + on 30 October 2007 on Sky.
20	153	122	Ftn	Virgin Media Television	2007-10-01	Channel was relaunched and revamped as Virgin 1 on 1 October 2007.
—N/a	154	123	Ftn +1	Virgin Media Television	2007-10-01	Channel was relaunched and revamped as Virgin 1 +1 on 1 October 2007.
729	0208	—N/a	Radio Music Shop	Somethin' Else	2007-10-05
19	269	263	UKTV Bright Ideas	UKTV (BBC Worldwide/Virgin Media)	2007-10-14	Timeshared with Dave +1 and now Dave +1 uses UKTV Bright Ideas hours.
—N/a	522	217	Discovery Civilisation	Discovery Networks UK	2007-11-01	Replaced with Discovery Knowledge.
—N/a	377	—N/a	MinX	CSC Media Group	2007-11-22	Replaced with NME TV.
—N/a	924	—N/a	Red Hot Wives	RHF Productions Ltd (Northern and Shell)	2007-11-22	Replaced with Red Hot Girl Girl on Sky.
—N/a	—N/a	120	Virgin Central 2	Virgin Media Television	2007-12-11	Replaced with VTV Music on Demand.
—N/a	359	350	Classic FM TV	Open Access Group (GCap Media)	2007-12-11	Ex-NTL only, replaced with oMusic TV on Sky.
—N/a	186	—N/a	Legal TV	TV Legal Limited	2007-12-17	Replaced with Red TV.
—N/a	192	—N/a	MKTV	Milton Keynes Television Limited	2007-12-21	Financial problems.
—N/a	652	—N/a	Vector 24/7	Vector Direct	2007-12-27	Replaced with JML Choice.
—N/a	656	—N/a	Shop Vector +	Vector Direct	2007-12-27	Replaced with JML Innovation.
—N/a	423	—N/a	The Golf Channel	JJB Sports	2007-12-31	Sky EPG slot bought by Setanta.

==== 2008 ====
DTT	Freesat	Sky	Virgin TV	Channel name	Owner/parent company at the time	Date shutdown	Reason
—N/a	—N/a	—N/a	832	Leonardo	Sitcom Group	2008-01-07	Ex-Telewest only.
—N/a	—N/a	204	—N/a	OBE TV +1	OBE TV Ltd	2008-01-08	OBE TV's Sky EPG slot bought by DMAX, OBE TV moved to 204.
—N/a	—N/a	855	—N/a	Quiz Call	Ostrich Media (owned by iTouch)	2008-01-08	Ceased broadcasting before moving to Channel 5.
717	—N/a	0127	—N/a	Oneword Radio	UBC Media	2008-01-11	Financial problems.
—N/a	—N/a	663	—N/a	Vinappris	Vinappris Limited	2008-01-11
—N/a	—N/a	832	—N/a	DD News	Rayat Television Enterprises Limited (Doordarshan)	2008-01-22	Sky EPG slot bought by 9X. Distributor entered liquidation.
—N/a	—N/a	346	325	MTV Flux	MTV Networks Europe	2008-02-01	Replaced with MTV ONE +1.
—N/a	—N/a	632	—N/a	JML Direct 2	JML Direct Limited	2008-02-07	Replaced with JML Lifestyle.
—N/a	—N/a	657	—N/a	JML Extra	JML Direct Limited	2008-02-07	Replaced with JML Solutions.
—N/a	—N/a	806	—N/a	The Musik	ARY Group	2008-02-22	Replaced with ARY OneWorld.
—N/a	—N/a	805	—N/a	DM Islam TV	DM Digital Television Ltd	2008-03-02	Replaced with DM News Plus.
—N/a	—N/a	293	—N/a	Living In Spain TV	Richard Browne	2008-03-19
—N/a	—N/a	357	—N/a	B4	CSC Media Group	2008-03-26	Replaced with Flava.
—N/a	—N/a	817	—N/a	Aapna Channel	Intellivision Broadcast UK Limited	2008-03-28
—N/a	—N/a	375	—N/a	MusFlash TV	Musflash TV Ltd	2008/03
—N/a	—N/a	843	—N/a	Pokerzone TV	Digital Television Production Company Ltd	2008-04-07
—N/a	—N/a	0202	953	Virgin Radio Groove	SMG plc	2008-04-17
—N/a	—N/a	549	—N/a	Discovery Channel +1.5	Discovery Networks UK	2008-04-21	Replaced with Discovery Science +1.
—N/a	—N/a	—N/a	482	Red Hot Asians	RHF Productions Ltd (Northern and Shell)	2008-04-22
—N/a	—N/a	205	—N/a	FX +1	Fox International Channels (News Corporation)	2008-04-28	Replaced with FX HD.
—N/a	—N/a	819	—N/a	Sahara Filmy	Sahara One Media and Entertainment Limited	2008-04-24	Sky EPG slot bought by SAB TV.
—N/a	—N/a	627	—N/a	POP +1	CSC Media Group	2008-05-19	Replaced with Kix!.
—N/a	—N/a	367	—N/a	Flaunt +1	CSC Media Group	2008-06-04	Replaced with Pop Girl +1.
—N/a	—N/a	800	—N/a	RoA	Ravensbourne	2008-06-11	Temporary channel for Rave on Air 2008. Chislehurst only.
—N/a	—N/a	363	—N/a	Bliss +1	CSC Media Group	2008-06-11	Capacity used for AnimeCentral/Showcase TV.
—N/a	—N/a	197	—N/a	Life One	Life TV Media	2008-06-16	Suddenly went off air. Replaced with Life.
—N/a	—N/a	654	758	Price Crash	Price Crash TV Ltd	2008-06-17	Entered administration. Sky EPG slot bought by KBC2.
—N/a	—N/a	678	—N/a	Price Crash 2	Price Crash TV Ltd	2008-06-17	Entered administration. Sky EPG slot bought by KBC.
—N/a	—N/a	833	—N/a	DD India	Rayat Television Enterprises Limited (Doordarshan)	2008-06-18	Sky EPG slot bought by 9XM. Distributor entered liquidation.
—N/a	—N/a	148	—N/a	Zone Reality Extra	Chello Zone	2008-07-01	Replaced with Zone Horror +1, which swapped Sky EPG slots with Zone Thriller.
—N/a	—N/a	270	—N/a	Performance Channel	Eicom plc	2008-07-01
—N/a	—N/a	803	—N/a	DM News Plus	DM Digital Television Ltd	2008-07-08	Sky EPG slot bought by AAP TV.
—N/a	—N/a	821	—N/a	Channel Punjab	Channel Punjab UK Ltd.	2008-07-09	Entered liquidation.
18	—N/a	360	330	The Hits	Box Television (Bauer Group/Channel Four Television Corporation)	2008-08-15	Replaced with 4Music.
—N/a	—N/a	171	—N/a	Raj Worldwide	Raj TV Limited	2008-08-22
—N/a	—N/a	199	—N/a	AnimeCentral	CSC Media Group	2008-08-27	Replaced with Showcase TV.
—N/a	—N/a	946	—N/a	Red Hot Raw	RHF Productions Ltd (Northern and Shell)	2008-08-28
—N/a	—N/a	947	—N/a	Red Hot Viewers	RHF Productions Ltd (Northern and Shell)	2008-08-28
—N/a	—N/a	667	—N/a	JML Solutions	JML Direct Limited	2008-09-06	Replaced with JML CookShop.
—N/a	—N/a	887	—N/a	Applause	Canis Media	2008-09-08	Replaced with Nigeria Movies.
—N/a	—N/a	260	—N/a	Performance Mainstreet	Eicom plc	2008-09-10	Replaced with Rock on TV.
—N/a	—N/a	888	—N/a	Awareness TV	Canis Media	2008-09-15	Replaced with Ocean Finance.
—N/a	—N/a	258	—N/a	UKTV Style +2	UKTV (BBC Worldwide/Virgin Media)	2008-09-15	Replaced with Watch. Sky only.
—N/a	—N/a	666	—N/a	JML Innovation	JML Direct Limited	2008-09-23	Replaced with JML BeautyShop.
—N/a	—N/a	911	—N/a	Playboy One	Playboy Enterprises	2008-10-01	Replaced with Paul Raymond TV.
—N/a	—N/a	155	—N/a	Hollywood TV	Hollywood Classics Movies Limited	2008-10-01	Sky EPG slot bought by Watch +1.
—N/a	—N/a	803	—N/a	AAP TV	Sharda International Ltd	2008-10-07	Returned 8 December 2008.
—N/a	—N/a	257	—N/a	Sky Arts +1	BSkyB	2008-10-20	Replaced with Sky Arts 2.
—N/a	—N/a	812	—N/a	Mana Telugu		2008-10-22
—N/a	—N/a	0113	961	TheJazz	Global Radio	2008-11-03	Replaced with Chill.
—N/a	—N/a	204	—N/a	Pulse +1	Portland Interactive Ltd	2008-11-09	Replaced with HiTV.
—N/a	—N/a	681	—N/a	World Wide Shop	Enterr10 Media UK Limited	2008-11-19
—N/a	—N/a	375	—N/a	Scuzz +1	CSC Media Group	2008-11-21	Sky EPG slot bought by NHK World TV.
—N/a	—N/a	207	—N/a	Pulse +30 mins	Portland Interactive Ltd	2008-11-24	Sky EPG slot bought by OBE TV.
—N/a	—N/a	272	—N/a	The Baby Channel	Simply Media	2008-11-24	Replaced with Simply Movies.
—N/a	—N/a	547	—N/a	The Business Channel	LITV Limited	2008-11-20	Went bankrupt.
721	—N/a	0182	—N/a	Mojo Radio	Bauer Radio	2008-11-30
104	—N/a	—N/a	—N/a	Teletext on 4	Teletext Ltd.	2008/11/	Replaced with 1-2-1 Dating.
—N/a	251	427	—N/a	The Fight Network	TFN Global Inc	2008-12-01
—N/a	—N/a	180	—N/a	Red TV	TV Legal Limited	2008-12-08	Replaced with Brit Hits (AKA British Hits).
—N/a	—N/a	384	—N/a	MTV One +2	MTV Networks Europe	2008-12-16	Hidden from the Sky EPG. Replaced with MTVN HD.
—N/a	—N/a	456	—N/a	SportsXchange	SportsXchange plc	2008-12-17	Financial problems.
—N/a	—N/a	882	—N/a	Sky Venue	BSkyB	2008	Commercial and licensed premises only.

==== 2009 ====
DTT	Freesat	Sky	Virgin TV	Channel name	Owner/parent company at the time	Date shutdown	Reason
—N/a	—N/a	0141	—N/a	Raaj Radio	Subrung Broadcasting Ltd.	2009-01-07
42	—N/a	196	—N/a	Nuts tv	Turner Broadcasting System Europe (Time Warner)	2009-01-15	Replaced with CNN International on Freeview
—N/a	—N/a	210	—N/a	Nuts tv +1	Turner Broadcasting System Europe (Time Warner)	2009-01-15
—N/a	—N/a	279	—N/a	Discovery Travel & Living +1	Discovery Networks UK	2009-01-20	Replaced with Investigation Discovery.
—N/a	411	274	—N/a	Overseas Property TV	MRI Media Ltd.	2009-01-27
—N/a	—N/a	264	—N/a	Wine TV	Wine Network Inc.	2009-01-21	Technical problem.
—N/a	—N/a	0195	—N/a	Radio Tatras International	Radio Tatras Int Ltd	2009-01-25
—N/a	—N/a	653	—N/a	TV Warehouse	JML Direct Limited	2009-02-02	Replaced with JML Home & DIY. Returned on 11 September 2013.
—N/a	—N/a	661	—N/a	TV Warehouse 2	JML Direct Limited	2009-02-02	Replaced with Shop Now TV.
—N/a	—N/a	173	160	Trouble +1	Virgin Media Television	2009-02-05	Replaced with Living2 +1.
—N/a	—N/a	964	—N/a	Pulse	Portland Interactive Ltd	2009-02-10	Replaced with Dirty Talk.
—N/a	503	379	—N/a	Bubble Hits	Creative Sounds Limited	2009-02-13	Financial problems.
—N/a	—N/a	379	—N/a	Bubble Hits Ireland	Creative Sounds Limited	2009-02-13	Financial difficulties.
—N/a	—N/a	260	—N/a	Rock on TV	Eicom plc	2009-02-16
—N/a	—N/a	803	—N/a	AAP TV	Sharda International Ltd	2009-02-19	Sky EPG slot bought by Hidayat TV.
—N/a	—N/a	0213	—N/a	PRL 24	PRL 24 Ltd	2009-03-01	Sky EPG slot bought by Asian Star Radio.
—N/a	—N/a	253	—N/a	Travel Channel 2	Travel Channel International Ltd.	2009-03-02	Sky EPG slot bought by Style Network.
—N/a	—N/a	666	—N/a	JML BeautyShop	JML Direct Limited	2009-03-02	Replaced with JML Lifestyle
—N/a	—N/a	340	—N/a	G2 Family	G2 Family Limited	2009-03-04
—N/a	—N/a	242	274	Discovery Real Time Extra	Discovery Networks UK	2009-03-20	Replaced with Discovery Shed.
—N/a	—N/a	448	—N/a	Arsenal Replay	Arsenal F.C./Setanta Sports/Input Media	2009-03-27
—N/a	—N/a	262	—N/a	Real Estate TV	Fox International Channels (News Corporation)	2009-04-01	Sky EPG slot bought by Chello Zone.
—N/a	—N/a	263	—N/a	Real Estate TV +1	Fox International Channels (News Corporation)	2009-04-01	Sky EPG slot bought by Chello Zone.
—N/a	—N/a	172	159	Trouble	Virgin Media Television	2009-04-01	Replaced with Living +2.
—N/a	—N/a	213	—N/a	Young@Heart	PrimeTime TV Ltd	2009-04-01	Replaced with Elite TV.
—N/a	—N/a	0213	—N/a	Asian Star Radio	TV Legal Limited	2009-04-03
—N/a	—N/a	215	—N/a	Brit Hits	TV Legal Limited	2009-04-13	Replaced with Sikh Channel.
—N/a	—N/a	454	—N/a	AH TV	Arsenal F.C./Setanta Sports/Input Media	2009-04-28
—N/a	—N/a	—N/a	980	PPV Event	Virgin Media	2009-04-28	Unavailable in some ex-NTL areas.
—N/a	—N/a	838	—N/a	Jaagran	Zee Entertainment Enterprises	2009-04-30	Sky EPG slot bought by Punjjabi TV.
—N/a	—N/a	811	—N/a	Zee Gujarati	Zee Entertainment Enterprises	2009-05-01
—N/a	—N/a	0145	—N/a	Club Asia	Club Asia (London) Ltd.	2009-05-08	Poor viewing figures.
49	—N/a	—N/a	—N/a	Netplay TV	Netplay TV Broadcasting Limited	2009-05-13	Replaced with Rocks & Co. on Freeview
—N/a	—N/a	674	—N/a	JJB Sports TV	TV Sports Shop Ltd.	2009-05-15	JJB Sports went bankrupt
—N/a	—N/a	248	267	UKTV Gardens	UKTV (BBC Worldwide/Virgin Media)	2009-05-19	Replaced with Really.
—N/a	—N/a	920	481	Red Hot Just 18	RHF Productions Ltd (Northern and Shell)	2009-05-21	Replaced with Viewers Wives.
—N/a	—N/a	870	—N/a	Casino TV		2009-05-23
—N/a	—N/a	0215	—N/a	Zee Radio	Zee Entertainment Enterprises	2009-06-01	Removed by Zee.
—N/a	308	341	—N/a	Simply Movies	Simply Media Ltd	2009-06-15	Focusing on programme production and distribution.
—N/a	—N/a	0161	921	The Arrow	Global Radio	2009-06-22	Returned on 22 April 2014.
—N/a	—N/a	962	—N/a	Bedroom TV	Telecoms TV	2009-06-22
—N/a	—N/a	418	518	Setanta Sports News	Virgin Media Television & Setanta Sports	2009-06-23	Ceased broadcasting due to Setanta Sports GB going into administration.
34	—N/a	423	538	Setanta Sports 1	Setanta Sports	2009-06-23	Ceased broadcasting due to Setanta Sports GB going into administration.
—N/a	—N/a	424	539	Setanta Sports 2	Setanta Sports	2009-06-23	Ceased broadcasting due to Setanta Sports GB going into administration.
—N/a	—N/a	429	543	Setanta Golf	Setanta Sports	2009-06-23	Ceased broadcasting due to Setanta Sports GB going into administration. Sky EPG slot bought by ESPN.
—N/a	—N/a	436	540	Celtic TV	Setanta Sports	2009-06-23	Ceased broadcasting due to Setanta Sports GB going into administration.
—N/a	—N/a	438	541	Rangers TV	Setanta Sports	2009-06-23	Ceased broadcasting due to Setanta Sports GB going into administration.
—N/a	—N/a	437	—N/a	Setanta Commercial	Setanta Sports	2009-06-23	Ceased broadcasting due to Setanta Sports GB going into administration.
—N/a	—N/a	957	—N/a	Live XXX	Ghana Development Foundation	2009-06-26	Ceased broadcasting.
—N/a	401	267	—N/a	Wedding TV +1	Wedding TV Limited	2009-07-01	Replaced with Wedding TV Asia.
—N/a	142	—N/a	—N/a	BET HD	Viacom	2009-07-04	Temporary channel for the BET Awards 2009.
—N/a	—N/a	684	—N/a	Tron Direct 2	Tron Direct Limited	2009-07-08	Ceased broadcasting.
—N/a	—N/a	960	—N/a	Chat Back	Go Ape TV Limited	2009-07-09	Ceased broadcasting. Sky EPG slot given to Live 960.
—N/a	—N/a	281	—N/a	Monte Carlo TV	Digital Television Production Company Limited	2009-07-28	Sky EPG slot bought by LA Muscle TV.
—N/a	—N/a	330	—N/a	AIT Movistar	Africa Independent Television	2009-07-28	Ceased broadcasting.
—N/a	—N/a	630	—N/a	Nicktoonsters	Nickelodeon UK (MTV Networks Europe/BSkyB)	2009-07-31	Replaced with Nicktoons Replay.
—N/a	—N/a	836	—N/a	KBC	Kashmir Broadcasting Corporation Limited	2009-07-31	Sky EPG slot bought by Ahlebait TV.
—N/a	451	884	—N/a	Audi Channel	Volkswagen Group	2009-08-01	Ceased broadcasting.
—N/a	—N/a	188	—N/a	Showcase TV	CSC Media Group	2009-08-03	Replaced with True Entertainment.
—N/a	—N/a	794	—N/a	DW-TV Europe	ARD	2009-08-03	Carriage agreement expired. Remains FTA on other satellites.
—N/a	—N/a	435	542	Arsenal TV	Arsenal F.C./Input Media/Setanta Sports	2009-08-07	Ceased broadcasting due to Setanta Sports GB going into administration.
—N/a	662	828	—N/a	9X	INX Network	2009-08-11	Merged with 9XM. Sky EPG slot bought by Ummah Channel.
32	—N/a	—N/a	—N/a	SmileTV	Cellcast Group	2009-08-20
—N/a	—N/a	433	—N/a	Racing World	Racing Post	2009-08-24	Ceased broadcasting.
—N/a	—N/a	662	—N/a	JML Choice	JML Direct Limited	2009-09-04	Replaced with JML Active
—N/a	—N/a	186	—N/a	Life	All Entertainment Limited	2009-09-15	Ceased broadcasting.
—N/a	—N/a	331	—N/a	World Movies TV	Rapid Eye Motion Ltd.	2009-09-17	Ceased broadcasting.
—N/a	—N/a	961	—N/a	Just4Us	Just4Us TV Limited	2009-09-22	Ceased broadcasting. Sky EPG slot bought by Climax3 – 3.
—N/a	—N/a	167	—N/a	Information TV 2	Information TV	2009-10-01	Sky EPG slot bought by Quest. Returned on 8 February 2010 as Showcase.
—N/a	—N/a	935	—N/a	Skincity	TVX Europe Limited	2009-10-01	Sky EPG slot given to PrimeTime PPV.
—N/a	—N/a	795	—N/a	TVE Internacional	Televisión Española	2009-10-02
—N/a	—N/a	879	—N/a	Cupid TV	Tanla Solutions Ltd	2009-10-05
—N/a	—N/a	838	—N/a	Punjjabi TV	World Media Connect	2009-10-09	Ceased broadcasting due to a technical problem. Sky EPG slot bought by Madani Channel.
—N/a	—N/a	0212	—N/a	Hot Digital Radio	Hot Digital Ltd	2009-10-13
—N/a	—N/a	837	—N/a	AT Global Network	AT Global Ltd	2009-10-16	Sky EPG slot bought by Fast TV.
—N/a	—N/a	905	—N/a	Filth	Northern and Shell	2009-10-23	Sky EPG slot given to Red Hot Mums.
21	—N/a	358	313	TMF	MTV Networks Europe	2009-10-26	Replaced with VIVA.
—N/a	—N/a	—N/a	931	102.5 Clyde 1	Bauer Radio	2009-10-29	Ex-Telewest, Uddingston regional headend only.
—N/a	—N/a	—N/a	931	Hallam FM	Bauer Radio	2009-10-29	Ex-Telewest, Barnsley regional headend only.
—N/a	—N/a	—N/a	932	97.3 Forth One	Bauer Radio	2009-10-29	Ex-Telewest, Edinburgh and Uddingston regional headends only.
—N/a	—N/a	—N/a	932	Magic 999	Bauer Radio	2009-10-29	Ex-Telewest, Preston regional headend only.
—N/a	—N/a	—N/a	932	Metro Radio	Bauer Radio	2009-10-29	Ex-Telewest, Gateshead regional headend only.
—N/a	—N/a	—N/a	932	Radio City 96.7	Bauer Radio	2009-10-29	Ex-Telewest, Knowsley regional headend only.
—N/a	—N/a	—N/a	933	96.3 Radio Aire	Bauer Radio	2009-10-29	Ex-Telewest, Barnsley regional headend only.
—N/a	—N/a	—N/a	933	97.4 Rock FM	Bauer Radio	2009-10-29	Ex-Telewest, Knowsley and Preston regional headends only.
—N/a	—N/a	—N/a	933	Real Radio	GMG Radio	2009-10-29	Ex-Telewest, Edinburgh and Uddingston regional headends only.
—N/a	—N/a	—N/a	934	TFM Radio	Bauer Radio	2009-10-29	Ex-Telewest, Gateshead regional headend only.
—N/a	—N/a	—N/a	935	Magic 1152	Bauer Radio	2009-10-29	Ex-Telewest, Gateshead regional headend only.
—N/a	—N/a	—N/a	936	Tay FM	Bauer Radio	2009-10-29	Ex-Telewest, Edinburgh regional headend only.
—N/a	—N/a	—N/a	937	The Pulse of West Yorkshire	UTV Radio	2009-10-29	Ex-Telewest, Barnsley regional headend only.
302	—N/a	—N/a	—N/a	302	BBC	2009-11-02	Space used for HD channels in post-switchover areas. Returned on 25 July 2012.
305	—N/a	—N/a	—N/a	305	BBC	2009-11-02	Space used for HD channels in post-switchover areas.
—N/a	—N/a	670	—N/a	Gems TV 3	Gems TV UK Ltd.	2009-11-02
—N/a	—N/a	262	—N/a	? TV	Chello Zone	2009-11-09	Sky EPG slot given to Food Network.
—N/a	—N/a	263	—N/a	? TV +1	Chello Zone	2009-11-09	Sky EPG slot given to Food Network +1.
—N/a	136	146	148	Zone Reality	Chello Zone	2009-11-16	Replaced with CBS Reality.
—N/a	—N/a	147	—N/a	Zone Reality +1	Chello Zone	2009-11-16	Replaced with CBS Reality +1.
—N/a	135	149	—N/a	Zone Romantica	Chello Zone	2009-11-16	Replaced with CBS Drama.
—N/a	137	148	—N/a	Zone Thriller	Chello Zone	2009-11-16	Replaced with CBS Action.
—N/a	—N/a	647	—N/a	Travel Deals Direct	Travel Channel International Ltd.	2009-11-30	Sky EPG slot bought by Rocks TV.
—N/a	—N/a	—N/a	943	Radio City 96.7	Orion Media (Lloyds TSB Development Capital/Phil Riley)	2009-11-30	Ex-Telewest, Perry Barr (Witton) and Wolverhampton regional headends only.
—N/a	—N/a	—N/a	964	96.4FM BRMB	Orion Group (Lloyds TSB Development Capital/Phil Riley)	2009-11-30	Ex-Telewest, Perry Barr (Witton) and Wolverhampton regional headends only.
103	—N/a	—N/a	—N/a	Teletext Casino	Teletext Ltd.	2009-12-01
—N/a	—N/a	883	—N/a	Open Access	Open Access Group	2009-12-03	Sky EPG slot bought by Renault TV.
—N/a	726	0200	951	Absolute Xtreme	TIML Radio Limited	2009-12-04	Replaced with Absolute 80s.
—N/a	—N/a	—N/a	930	Pulse FM		2009-12-07	Ex-Telewest, Basildon regional headend only.
—N/a	—N/a	—N/a	933	Heart Essex	Global Radio	2009-12-07	Ex-Telewest, Basildon regional headend only.
—N/a	—N/a	—N/a	935	Heart Bristol	Global Radio	2009-12-07	Ex-Telewest, Aztec West regional headend only.
—N/a	—N/a	—N/a	936	Heart Gloucestershire	Global Radio	2009-12-07	Ex-Telewest, Aztec West regional headend only.
—N/a	—N/a	—N/a	941	Brunel Classic Gold	Global Radio	2009-12-07	Ex-Telewest, Aztec West regional headend only.
—N/a	—N/a	—N/a	963	Heart Kent	Global Radio	2009-12-07	Ex-Telewest, Basildon regional headend only.
—N/a	—N/a	—N/a	974	Red Dragon FM	Global Radio	2009-12-07	Ex-Telewest, Aztec West regional headend only.
—N/a	—N/a	672	—N/a	Teletext Holidays TV	Teletext Ltd.	2009-12-10	Sky EPG slot given to Rabbit Chat.
—N/a	—N/a	0171	—N/a	Fun Kids	Folder Media	2009-12-16
—N/a	—N/a	829	—N/a	9XM	INX Network	2009-12-24	Sky EPG slot bought by Colors. Returned on 14 February 2012.
—N/a	—N/a	837	—N/a	Fast TV	Fast TV Ltd	2009-12-31

==== 2010 ====
DTT	Freesat	Sky	Virgin TV	Channel name	Owner/parent company at the time	Date shutdown	Reason
—N/a	—N/a	956	—N/a	LA Babes	Advanced Media Limited	2010-01-04	Sky EPG slot bought by Cream.
—N/a	—N/a	745–749	—N/a	Sky Box Office	BSkyB	2010-01-05
—N/a	—N/a	938–942	—N/a	18 Plus Movies	BSkyB	2010-01-05
—N/a	—N/a	907	—N/a	Friendly TV	Telecoms TV Limited	2010-01-06	Sky EPG slot bought by Dirty Talk.
—N/a	—N/a	963	—N/a	HBW TV	Renson Media Ltd	2010-01-07
—N/a	—N/a	—N/a	930	BBC Radio Sheffield	BBC	2010-01-11	Ex-Telewest, Barnsley regional headend only.
—N/a	—N/a	—N/a	937	BBC Radio Leeds	BBC	2010-01-11	Ex-Telewest, Barnsley regional headend only.
—N/a	—N/a	270	—N/a	SA Direct	Southern Africa Direct	2010-01-14	Sky EPG slot bought by Takbeer TV.
—N/a	—N/a	0161	—N/a	ILM Radio	UK Asia Media Solutions Ltd	2010-01-14
310	—N/a	—N/a	—N/a	TopUp Anytime 4	Top Up TV	2010-01-19
45	—N/a	—N/a	—N/a	National Lottery Xtra	Camelot Group	2010-02-01
—N/a	—N/a	—N/a	930	BBC Radio Newcastle	BBC	2010-02-04	Ex-Telewest, Gateshead regional headend only.
—N/a	—N/a	—N/a	931	BBC Tees	BBC	2010-02-04	Ex-Telewest, Gateshead regional headend only.
—N/a	—N/a	937	—N/a	SportxxxWives	Satellite Entertainment Limited	2010-02-08
—N/a	—N/a	879	—N/a	Rabbit Chat	Teletext Ltd.	2010-02-23
—N/a	—N/a	651	—N/a	Ideal World 2	Ideal Shopping Direct plc	2010-03-03	Replaced with Ideal Extra.
—N/a	—N/a	668	—N/a	Ideal World 3	Ideal Shopping Direct plc	2010-03-03	Replaced with Ideal and More.
—N/a	—N/a	344	—N/a	Nigeria Movies	Canis Media	2010-03-05	Replaced with FOBO Movies.
—N/a	—N/a	—N/a	945	BBC Radio Shropshire	BBC	2010-03-07	Ex-Telewest, Perry Barr (Witton) and Wolverhampton regional headends only.
—N/a	—N/a	—N/a	946	BBC Radio WM	BBC	2010-03-07	Ex-Telewest, Perry Barr (Witton) and Wolverhampton regional headends only.
—N/a	—N/a	202	—N/a	NTA International	Nigerian Television Authority	2010-03-09	Returned on 20 June 2018.
—N/a	—N/a	—N/a	118	Virgin Central	Virgin Media Television	2010-03-11	Continues on demand.
—N/a	—N/a	207	—N/a	OBE TV	OBE TV Ltd	2010-03-12	Returned on 22 July 2010.
—N/a	—N/a	376	—N/a	Flaunt	CSC Media Group	2010-03-17	Replaced with Dance Nation TV.
—N/a	—N/a	—N/a	931	BBC Radio Kent	BBC	2010-03-18	Ex-Telewest, Basildon regional headend only.
—N/a	—N/a	—N/a	938	BBC Radio Bristol	BBC	2010-03-24	Ex-Telewest, Aztec West regional headend only.
—N/a	—N/a	—N/a	939	BBC Radio Gloucestershire	BBC	2010-03-24	Ex-Telewest, Aztec West regional headend only.
—N/a	—N/a	378	—N/a	Rockworld TV	Carnaby Media	2010-03-29	Sky EPG slot bought by Lava.
—N/a	—N/a	—N/a	930	BBC Radio Lancashire	BBC	2010/03	Ex-Telewest, Preston regional headend only.
—N/a	—N/a	—N/a	930	BBC Radio Merseyside	BBC	2010/03	Ex-Telewest, Knowsley regional headend only.
—N/a	450	178	280	Men & Motors	ITV Digital Channels Ltd (ITV plc)	2010-04-01	Replaced with ITV1 HD.
—N/a	—N/a	581	279	GOD Europe	The Angel Foundation	2010-04-01	Merged with GOD Channel. Sky EPG slot bought by Revelation TV.
—N/a	—N/a	592	—N/a	Genesis	Revelation TV Ltd	2010-04-08	Programmes moved to Revelation TV.
—N/a	—N/a	201	—N/a	The Unexplained Channel	Monster Pictures	2010-04-21	Sky EPG slot bought by Showcase.
—N/a	—N/a	655	—N/a	Thomas Cook TV	Thomas Cook TV Ltd.	2010-05-01	Sky EPG slot bought by Jewellery Maker.
—N/a	—N/a	902	—N/a	Spice Extreme	Playboy Enterprises	2010-05-12	Sky EPG slot bought by Tease Me TV 2.
—N/a	—N/a	624	—N/a	Baby First TV	BFTV Limited	2010-05-18
—N/a	403	279	—N/a	Rural TV	Rural TV International	2010-06-02	Merged with Horse & Country TV.
—N/a	—N/a	683	—N/a	Shopping TV	Shopping TV UK Ltd	2010-06-04
—N/a	—N/a	344	—N/a	FOBO Movies	Canis 103 Ltd	2010-06-07
—N/a	—N/a	948	—N/a	Tease Me 2	Bang Channels Limited	2010-06-09	Sky EPG slot bought by ChatGirl TV2.
—N/a	—N/a	0203	—N/a	Ignition Radio	World Radio Network	2010-06-21	Sky EPG slot bought by Absolute 90s.
—N/a	—N/a	669	—N/a	Sky Travel	BSkyB	2010-06-24	Ceased broadcasting due to competition from the internet.
—N/a	—N/a	395	—N/a	Music Choice	Music Choice Europe Ltd.	2010-06-30	Failed to reach an agreement with Sky over carriage fees.
300	—N/a	—N/a	—N/a	4TVInteractive	Inview Interactive Limited	2010-06-29	Carriage agreement expired.
—N/a	—N/a	396	—N/a	Music Choice Extra	Music Choice Europe Ltd.	2010-06-30	Failed to reach an agreement with Sky over carriage fees.
90	—N/a	—N/a	—N/a	TV News 2	Cellcast Group	2010-06-30	Carriage agreement ended.
—N/a	—N/a	172	159	Living +2	Virgin Media Television	2010-07-01	Replaced with Living Loves on 5 July 2010.
106	—N/a	—N/a	—N/a	Directgov	Teletext Ltd.	2010-07-01
89	—N/a	—N/a	—N/a	TV News	Cellcast Group	2010-07-01	Carriage agreement ended. Returned on 27 October 2010.
—N/a	—N/a	740–741	—N/a	Sky Box Office	BSkyB	2010-07-01
—N/a	—N/a	261	—N/a	Fashion TV	Michel Adam Lisowski	2010-07-02
—N/a	—N/a	171	—N/a	Channel TBC	Channel 5 Broadcasting (RTL Group)	2010-07-13	Replaced with Five HD.
—N/a	—N/a	662	—N/a	JML Choice	JML Direct Ltd.	2010-07-17	Returned on 19 July 2010.
—N/a	—N/a	667	—N/a	JML CookShop +	JML Direct Ltd.	2010-07-19	Sky EPG slot given to JML Choice.
—N/a	—N/a	0194	—N/a	FWR	World Evangelism Bible Church	2010-08-01
—N/a	—N/a	446	—N/a	Real Madrid TV	Real Madrid F.C.	2010-08-05
202	—N/a	—N/a	—N/a	MCR Shopping 2	Guardian Media Group	2010-08-05	Manchester only.
—N/a	—N/a	243	281	Sky Real Lives	BSkyB	2010-08-19	Focusing on Sky1 and Sky2.
—N/a	—N/a	244	—N/a	Sky Real Lives +1	BSkyB	2010-08-19	Focusing on Sky1 and Sky2.
—N/a	—N/a	278	—N/a	Sky Real Lives HD	BSkyB	2010-08-19	Focusing on Sky1 and Sky2.
—N/a	—N/a	245	282	Sky Real Lives 2	BSkyB	2010-08-19	Focusing on Sky1 and Sky2.
—N/a	650	880	240	Teachers TV	Education Digital Management Limited	2010-08-31	Budget cuts/focussing on online service.
—N/a	—N/a	661	—N/a	JML Lifestyle	JML Direct Ltd.	2010-09-01	Sky EPG slot bought by Sangat TV.
—N/a	—N/a	369	—N/a	OMusic TV	Open Access Channels	2010-09-01	Sky EPG slot bought by Vintage TV.
—N/a	—N/a	200	—N/a	Controversial TV	Edge Media	2010-09-08	Returned on 1 November 2010.
—N/a	—N/a	675	—N/a	Max TV	Datel Holdings Ltd	2010-09-16	Still trading online only. Sky EPG slot bought by Olive TV.
—N/a	—N/a	189	—N/a	Open Access 2	Open Access Group	2010-09-21	Sky EPG slot bought by Information TV +1.
—N/a	—N/a	860	—N/a	Casino TV	Smart TV Broadcasting Limited	2010-09-27	Sky EPG slot bought by Jackpot Games.
—N/a	—N/a	585	—N/a	Faith World +1	World Evangelism Bible Church	2010-10-01	Sky EPG slot bought by Sikh TV.
—N/a	—N/a	911	—N/a	Elite	Playboy Enterprises	2010-10-01	Replaced with 40 n Naughty.
—N/a	—N/a	656	—N/a	Gems TV 2	The Colourful Company Group Limited	2010-10-08	Began simulcasting Gems TV 1 in January 2010. Replaced with Gem Collector.
—N/a	—N/a	807	—N/a	Aastha TV	Aastha Broadcasting Network (UK) Ltd.	2010-10-14	Replaced with Disha. Returned on 1 January 2011.
—N/a	—N/a	666	—N/a	JML Active	JML Direct Ltd.	2010-10-18	Sky EPG slot bought by Rocks & Co 1.
—N/a	—N/a	658	—N/a	Bilberry TV	QVC	2010-10-25	Replaced with QVC Beauty.
308	—N/a	—N/a	—N/a	TopUp Anytime 2	Top Up TV	2010-11-09
—N/a	—N/a	807	—N/a	Disha	Aastha Broadcasting Network (UK) Ltd.	2010-11-10
—N/a	—N/a	0112	919	Galaxy Yorkshire	Global Radio	2010-11-15	Replaced with LBC News 1152 on television platforms.
728	—N/a	—N/a	—N/a	Heart West Midlands	Global Radio	2010-11-15	West Midlands only. Replaced with Heart London.
—N/a	—N/a	912	—N/a	Tease Me	Bang Channels Limited	2010-11-19	Licence revoked by Ofcom.
—N/a	—N/a	959	—N/a	Tease Me 3	Bang Channels Limited	2010-11-19	Licence revoked by Ofcom.
98	—N/a	—N/a	—N/a	TMTV	Bang Media (London) Limited	2010-11-19	Licence revoked by Ofcom.
—N/a	—N/a	216	—N/a	Showcase +1	Information TV Limited	2010-11-23	Sky EPG slot bought by WTF. Returned on 1 December 2011.
—N/a	—N/a	595	—N/a	DBN	Kashmiri Broadcasting Corporation	2010-11-23	Licence revoked by Ofcom.
—N/a	—N/a	0205	—N/a	VOT Radio	VOT Radio Ltd	2010-11-26	Sky EPG slot bought by RCR.
—N/a	—N/a	342	—N/a	Shorts TV	Shorts International Ltd.	2010-11-29
—N/a	—N/a	843	—N/a	UCTV	Up & Coming TV Ltd	2010/11	Returned on 18 January 2011.
—N/a	—N/a	950	—N/a	LivexxxBabes	Satellite Entertainment Limited	2010-12-02	Returned on 13 January 2011.
—N/a	202	—N/a	—N/a	S4C2	S4C Authority	2010-12-06
—N/a	—N/a	739	—N/a	Sky Box Office HD3	BSkyB	2010-12-13
—N/a	401	267	—N/a	Wedding TV Asia	Wedding TV Limited	2010-12-14
—N/a	—N/a	786	—N/a	Bangla TV	Bangla TV Ltd.	2010/12	Returned on 17 June 2011.
—N/a	—N/a	997	—N/a	Sky Retail Info	BSkyB	2010	Commercial premises only.
—N/a	—N/a	—N/a	997	TV Smart Card Help	Virgin Media	2010	Areas which were receiving new smart cards only.

==== 2011 ====
DTT	Freesat	Sky	Virgin TV	Channel name	Owner/parent company at the time	Date shutdown	Reason
—N/a	—N/a	123	136	Bravo	Living TV Group (BSkyB)	2011-01-01	Closed because it served a similar demographic to Sky1. Sky EPG slot bought by Sky Livingit +1.
—N/a	—N/a	124	137	Bravo +1	Living TV Group (BSkyB)	2011-01-01	Closed because it served a similar demographic to Sky1. Sky EPG slot bought by FX.
—N/a	—N/a	153	138	Bravo 2	Living TV Group (BSkyB)	2011-01-01	Closed because it served a similar demographic to Sky1. Sky EPG slot bought by Sky 3+1.
—N/a	—N/a	867	141	Challenge Jackpot	Living TV Group (BSkyB)	2011-01-01	Sky EPG slot bought by Aastha TV.
—N/a	—N/a	647	—N/a	Rocks TV	The Colourful Company Group Ltd.	2011-01-01	Merged with Gem Collector. Sky EPG slot bought by RetailTherapytv.
35	—N/a	—N/a	—N/a	ITV Preview 1	ITV Digital Channels Ltd (ITV plc)	2011-01-31
20	—N/a	121	119	Channel One	BSkyB	2011-02-01	Closed because it served a similar demographic to Sky3. Freeview EPG slot bought by Challenge and Sky EPG slot bought by Sky Living +1.
—N/a	—N/a	122	120	Channel One +1	BSkyB	2011-02-01	Closed because it served a similar demographic to Sky3. Sky EPG slot bought by Sky Livingit.
—N/a	—N/a	160	—N/a	MTV Shows	MTV Networks Europe	2011-02-01	MTV was repositioned as an entertainment channel. Replaced with MTV Music. Sky EPG slot bought by MTV +1.
—N/a	—N/a	221	—N/a	OBE TV	OBE TV Ltd	2011-02-14	Returned on 10 March 2011.
—N/a	—N/a	0158	—N/a	Gaydar Radio	QSoft Consulting	2011-02-18	Poor listening figures.
—N/a	—N/a	663	—N/a	Stop + Shop	Thane International Inc.	2011-02-22
—N/a	—N/a	960	—N/a	Live 960	Hoppr Entertainment Limited	2011-03-03	Licence revoked by Ofcom.
—N/a	—N/a	922	—N/a	Cream	RHF Productions Ltd	2011-03-14	Returned on 12 June 2012.
—N/a	—N/a	889	—N/a	Sky Insider HD	BSkyB	2011-03-30	Returned on 5 May 2011.
—N/a	—N/a	273	—N/a	Luxury Life HD	Luxury Broadcasting Limited	2011-03-31
—N/a	—N/a	861	—N/a	Gala TV	Gala Coral Group	2011-04-01
—N/a	—N/a	157	—N/a	Film 24	Wicked TV	2011-04-04	Purchased by Sony Pictures Television. Sky EPG slot bought by Sony Entertainment Television.
—N/a	—N/a	190	—N/a	Open Access 3	Open Access Group	2011-04-04	Sky EPG slot bought by Sony Entertainment Television +1.
—N/a	—N/a	659	—N/a	Shop on TV	Jungle.uk.com Ltd.	2011-04-06	Sky EPG slot bought by PaversShoes.tv.
—N/a	—N/a	452	—N/a	Rush HD	Rainbow Media	2011-04-07
—N/a	—N/a	953	485	Gay TV	RHF Productions Ltd (Northern and Shell)	2011-04-07	Replaced with Flirt TV on Sky.
202	—N/a	—N/a	—N/a	MANCHESTERLOVE	Guardian Media Group	2011-04-27	Manchester only. Removed to provide bandwidth for Movies4Men to launch in Manchester only.
—N/a	—N/a	843	—N/a	UCTV	Up & Coming TV Ltd	2011-04-30	Returned on 3 June 2011.
—N/a	—N/a	682	—N/a	Entrepreneur Channel	Entrepreneur Channel plc	2011-05-18
45	—N/a	—N/a	—N/a	45		2011-05-18	Failed to launch.
—N/a	—N/a	860	—N/a	Jackpot Games	CC Media TV Limited	2011-05-19	Sky EPG slot bought by SonLife Broadcasting Network.
8	—N/a	—N/a	—N/a	TeleG	SDN Ltd (ITV plc)	2011-05-23	Removed in favour of BBC Alba.
90	—N/a	—N/a	—N/a	TV News	Cellcast Group	2011-05-31
—N/a	—N/a	931	—N/a	Hustler TV UK	Broadcasting (UK) Ltd.	2011-06-01	Sky EPG slot bought by xxXpanded TV.
—N/a	—N/a	933	—N/a	Girls Gone Wild	Broadcasting (Gaia) Ltd.	2011-06-01	Sky EPG slot bought by Flirt TV 2.
—N/a	—N/a	934	—N/a	Amateur Babes	Broadcasting (Gaia) Ltd.	2011-06-01	Sky EPG slot bought by Gay Chat TV.
—N/a	—N/a	—N/a	523	Eurosport 3D	TF1 Group	2011-06-06	Temporary channel for the 2011 French Open. Returned on 27 May 2012.
—N/a	809	667	—N/a	JML Choice	JML Direct Ltd.	2011-06-15	Freesat and Sky EPG slots given to JML Cookshop.
109	—N/a	—N/a	—N/a	Mobilizer	Teletext Ltd.	2011-07-11
—N/a	—N/a	956	—N/a	Red Hot 40+	RHF Productions Ltd (Northern and Shell)	2011-08-01	Sky EPG slot bought by Holiday+Cruise.
—N/a	—N/a	0168	—N/a	Amar Radio	Amar Radio	2011-08-15
—N/a	—N/a	836	—N/a	Ahlebait TV	Ahlebait TV Network Ltd	2011-09-01	Returned on 12 December 2011.
—N/a	—N/a	848	—N/a	Sikh TV	Sikh Media Limited	2011-09-02
—N/a	—N/a	221	—N/a	OBE TV	OBE TV Ltd	2011-09-12	Returned on 19 October 2011.
—N/a	209	507	—N/a	NHK World	NHK	2011-10-01	Decided to broadcast in HD only to reduce costs. Sky EPG slot given to NHK World HD.
—N/a	—N/a	797	—N/a	South For You	South For You Limited	2011-10-10	Sky EPG slot bought by UMP Movies.
—N/a	—N/a	885	—N/a	WatchmeTV.TV	Forenzquick UK Limited	2011-10-12	Sky EPG slot bought by Psychic Line.
—N/a	—N/a	950	—N/a	LivexxxBabes	Satellite Entertainment Limited	2011-10-12	Sky EPG slot bought by Red Light 4. Returned on 13 March 2012.
—N/a	—N/a	908	—N/a	Babeworld.tv	Babeworld TV Limited	2011-10-22	Licence revoked by Ofcom.
—N/a	—N/a	949	—N/a	House of Fun	House of Fun Television Limited	2011-10-22	Licence revoked by Ofcom.
—N/a	—N/a	952	—N/a	The Other Side	Forenzquick UK Limited	2011-10-22	Licence revoked by Ofcom.
—N/a	—N/a	221	—N/a	OBE TV	OBE TV Ltd	2011-10-28	Continued to broadcast off the EPG until 17 November 2011.
—N/a	—N/a	231	—N/a	Rosa	PBS UK LLC	2011-11-01	Replaced with PBS UK. Sky EPG slot given to Information TV in part exchange for the channel 166 slot.
—N/a	—N/a	277	—N/a	Diva TV +1	Universal Networks International	2011-11-01	Sky EPG slot bought by 9XM.
—N/a	—N/a	932	—N/a	100% Babes	Broadcasting (Gaia) Ltd.	2011-11-01	Sky EPG slot bought by Elite TV 4.
—N/a	—N/a	0184	—N/a	NME Radio	IPC Media	2011-12-05	Sky EPG slot bought by Shop Radio.
—N/a	—N/a	879	—N/a	Flirt TV	Northern & Shell	2011-12-06	Sky EPG slot given to 5* +1. Returned on 20 November 2013.

==== 2012 ====
DTT	Freesat	Sky	Virgin TV	Channel name	Owner/parent company at the time	Date shutdown	Reason
—N/a	—N/a	835	—N/a	Supreme Master TV	Supreme Master Television Limited	2012-01-03	Sky EPG slot bought by Elite TV 3.
—N/a	—N/a	734–739	—N/a	Sky Movies Box Office	BSkyB	2012-01-04
—N/a	516	382	—N/a	NME TV	CSC Media Group	2012-01-05	Replaced with Chart Show TV +1.
—N/a	—N/a	—N/a	555	TiVo PPV Events	Virgin Media	2012-01-12
—N/a	—N/a	0205	—N/a	RCR	Rainbow Christian Radio Limited	2012-01-13	Sky EPG slot bought by WRN Arabic.
—N/a	—N/a	515	—N/a	Press TV	IRIB	2012-01-20	Licence revoked by Ofcom.
—N/a	—N/a	273	—N/a	Luxury Life	Luxury Broadcasting Limited	2012-01-24	Returned on 1 March 2012.
—N/a	—N/a	275	—N/a	Body in Balance	Body in Balance Ltd	2012-02-13	Entered administration. Sky EPG slot bought by LivexxxBabes.
—N/a	—N/a	864	—N/a	Sky Bet	BSkyB	2012-02-13
—N/a	—N/a	934	—N/a	Gay Chat TV	Northern & Shell	2012-02-13	Sky EPG slot bought by The Dept Store.
—N/a	—N/a	269	164	Diva TV	Universal Networks International (NBCUniversal)	2012-02-14	Programmes moved to the Style Network. Sky EPG slot bought by More4 +2.
—N/a	—N/a	—N/a	554	PPV Live Events Help	Virgin Media	2012-02-15
—N/a	—N/a	130	159	Sky Living Loves	BSkyB	2012-02-21	Sky EPG slot given to Sky Arts 2.
—N/a	—N/a	920	—N/a	Filth	Northern & Shell	2012-02-28	Replaced with Reality Hub. Returned on 12 June 2012.
—N/a	—N/a	183	155	Current TV	Current Media, Inc.	2012-03-12	Failed distribution renegotiations with Sky. Sky EPG slot bought by Sony Entertainment Television +1.
306	—N/a	—N/a	—N/a	Channel Zero	Electra Entertainment Limited	2012/03
—N/a	—N/a	189	—N/a	Information TV +1	Information TV Limited	2012-04-02	Sky EPG slot bought by Men&Movies.
—N/a	—N/a	850	—N/a	Desh TV	Desh TV Limited	2012-04-03
—N/a	—N/a	834	—N/a	NTV	Runners TV Ltd	2012-04-14	Replaced with Channel 9 UK. Returned on 30 April 2012.
189	—N/a	—N/a	—N/a	Adult Section	DTT Multiplex Operators Ltd	2012-04-16	Made redundant after the split Adult category was merged into one.
199	—N/a	—N/a	—N/a	Adult Section	DTT Multiplex Operators Ltd	2012-04-16	Made redundant after the split Adult category was merged into one.
200	—N/a	—N/a	—N/a	Channel M	Guardian Media Group	2012-04-16	Manchester only.
—N/a	—N/a	888	—N/a	Ocean Finance	Ocean Finance and Mortgages Ltd	2012-04-16
—N/a	—N/a	680	—N/a	Screenshop 2	Bid Shopping	2012-04-29
—N/a	306	325	—N/a	Movies4Men 2	Sony Pictures Television	2012-05-02	Replaced with Sony Movie Channel, which swapped Sky EPG slots with Movies4Men.
—N/a	307	326	—N/a	Movies4Men 2 +1	Sony Pictures Television	2012-05-02	Replaced with Sony Movie Channel +1, which swapped Sky EPG slots with Movies4Men +1.
—N/a	—N/a	582	—N/a	Wonderful	Crown News Corporation plc	2012-05-03
—N/a	—N/a	0205	—N/a	WRN Arabic	WRN Broadcast	2012-05-03	Sky EPG slot bought by Kanshiradio.
—N/a	516	382	—N/a	Chart Show TV +1	CSC Media Group	2012-05-30	Replaced with BuzMuzik.
—N/a	—N/a	235	—N/a	Showcase +1	Information TV Limited	2012-06-06	Returned on 9 May 2013.
—N/a	—N/a	919	—N/a	Red Hot Fetish	Northern & Shell	2012-06-12	Replaced with Filth.
—N/a	—N/a	920	—N/a	Reality Hub	Northern & Shell	2012-06-12	Replaced with Cream.
—N/a	—N/a	904	—N/a	TVX Amateur	Northern & Shell	2012-06-15	Sky EPG slot given to Red Hot Amateur.
—N/a	—N/a	269	—N/a	More4 +2	Channel Four Television Corporation	2012-06-26	Replaced with 4seven, which swapped Sky EPG slots with Channel 4 HD.
—N/a	986	—N/a	—N/a	Teletext	Teletext Ltd.	2012-06-28
—N/a	—N/a	714–733	—N/a	Sky Movies Box Office	BSkyB	2012-07-02	Temporarily closed to free Sky EPG slots for the BBC's Olympics channels. Channels 714 – 731 returned on 16 August 2012.
—N/a	—N/a	881	—N/a	Pub Channel	BSkyB	2012-07-02	Temporarily closed to free Sky EPG slots for the BBC's Olympics channels. Returned on 15 August 2012.
—N/a	—N/a	211	—N/a	Bio. HD	A+E Networks UK (A+E Networks/BSkyB)	2012-07-03	Closed to allow Crime & Investigation Network HD to broadcast 24 hours a day. Replaced with Bio. +1.
—N/a	—N/a	364	338	Q TV	Box Television (Bauer Group/Channel Four Television Corporation)	2012-07-03	Replaced with Heat.
—N/a	—N/a	885	—N/a	Psychic Line	Playboy Enterprises	2012-07-03	Replaced with Red Light Rio.
—N/a	—N/a	831	—N/a	Imagine Dil Se	Turner Broadcasting System (Time Warner)	2012-07-06	Poor viewing figures in India. Sky EPG slot bought by Rishtey.
—N/a	—N/a	412	522	Eurosport HD	TF1 Group	2012-07-25	Replaced with British Eurosport HD.
—N/a	—N/a	918	—N/a	Cream	Northern & Shell	2012-07-26
—N/a	—N/a	231	—N/a	The Africa Channel +1	The Africa Channel Limited	2012-07-30	Replaced with eNCA Africa. Sky EPG slot bought by Sky Atlantic HD.
302	—N/a	—N/a	—N/a	302	BBC	2012-08-13	Temporary channel for the 2012 Summer Olympics.
304	—N/a	—N/a	—N/a	301 HD	BBC	2012-08-13	Temporary channel for the 2012 Summer Olympics.
—N/a	151–174	450–473	574–597	BBC Olympics 1–24	BBC	2012-08-13	Temporary channels for the 2012 Summer Olympics. Channels 1-8 returned on 1 August 2016.
—N/a	151–174	474–497	550–573	BBC Olympics 1 HD-24 HD	BBC	2012-08-13	Temporary channels for the 2012 Summer Olympics. Channels 1-8 returned on 1 August 2016.
—N/a	150	—N/a	—N/a	BBC Olympics Red Button	BBC	2012-08-13	Temporary channel for the 2012 Summer Olympics.
—N/a	—N/a	—N/a	523	Eurosport 3D	TF1 Group	2012-08-13	Temporary channel for the 2012 French Open and 2012 Summer Olympics.
—N/a	—N/a	595	—N/a	Praise TV	Destiny Broadcasting Network Europe Limited	2012-08-13	Licence revoked by Ofcom.
62	—N/a	—N/a	—N/a	TV Stars	Cellcast Group	2012-08-14	Failed to launch.
90	—N/a	—N/a	—N/a	TV News	Cellcast Group	2012-08-14	Failed to launch.
—N/a	—N/a	198	—N/a	Sumo TV	Cellcast Group	2012-08-21	Sky EPG slot bought by Horror Channel.
—N/a	—N/a	0177	—N/a	Chill	Global Radio	2012-08-24
304	—N/a	—N/a	—N/a	C4 Paralympics Extra	Channel Four Television Corporation	2012-09-10	Temporary channel for the 2012 Summer Paralympics.
—N/a	150–152	450–452	553–555	C4 Paralympics Extra 1–3	Channel Four Television Corporation	2012-09-10	Temporary channels for the 2012 Summer Paralympics.
—N/a	150–152	453–455	550–552	C4 Paralympics Extra 1 HD-3 HD	Channel Four Television Corporation	2012-09-10	Temporary channels for the 2012 Summer Paralympics.
—N/a	—N/a	0206	—N/a	Record Brazil	Record TV Ltd	2012-09-10
—N/a	—N/a	928	—N/a	Flirt TV 2	Northern & Shell	2012-09-20	Sky EPG slot bought by Klear TV.
84	—N/a	—N/a	—N/a	Al Jazeera 6–8	Al Jazeera	2012-09-27	Made redundant after Al Jazeera English began to broadcast 24 hours a day on DTT in post-DSO areas on 19 September 2012.
201	—N/a	—N/a	—N/a	Teletext Holidays	Teletext Ltd.	2012-10-01	Focusing on website and connected TV apps. Replaced with Holidays TV.
—N/a	—N/a	630	—N/a	Nicktoons Replay	Nickelodeon UK (Viacom International Media Networks Europe/BSkyB)	2012-10-02	Replaced with Nick Jr. +1.
—N/a	—N/a	943	—N/a	Babe Guide	Playboy Enterprises	2012-10-03
—N/a	—N/a	387	—N/a	Ramp'd	Global Music Television (Global Radio)	2012-10-11	Replaced with Heart TV.
—N/a	—N/a	388	—N/a	Ramp'd +2	Global Music Television (Global Radio)	2012-10-11	Replaced with Capital TV.
—N/a	—N/a	193	—N/a	HiTV	HiTV Ltd.	2012-10-12	Returned on 12 December 2012.
—N/a	—N/a	851	—N/a	9XM	9X Media	2012-10-12	Licence revoked by Ofcom. Returned on 8 November 2012.
—N/a	—N/a	843	—N/a	UCTV	Up & Coming TV Ltd	2012-10-26	Replaced with SAMAA TV.
—N/a	—N/a	338	445	Cinémoi	Mint Group	2012-11-13
—N/a	—N/a	808	802	ABP News	ABP Group	2012-11-22	Replaced with Star Jalsha on Sky and STAR Life OK on Virgin Media following the end of contractual agreements from STAR News. Returned on 3 July 2013.
—N/a	—N/a	0176	—N/a	Amrit Bani	Amrit Bani Radio	2012-11-27	Financial difficulties.
230	—N/a	—N/a	—N/a	Vision2	Vision247	2012-11-30	Licensing issue with Ofcom.
105	—N/a	—N/a	—N/a	S4C Clirlun	S4C Authority	2012-12-01	Wales only. Cost-saving measure following cuts to S4C's public funding. Space given to Channel 4 HD in Wales.
—N/a	—N/a	753	—N/a	Sky Movies Box Office HD2	BSkyB	2012-12-03
—N/a	—N/a	934	—N/a	Red Light Rio	Playboy Enterprises	2012-12-05	Sky EPG slot given to GirlGirl.
205	—N/a	—N/a	—N/a	Mail Travel TV	Associated Newspapers	2012-12-07	Space given to Holidays TV.
—N/a	—N/a	853	—N/a	UMP Stars	UTV Software Communications	2012-12-23	Poor viewing figures.
—N/a	—N/a	883	—N/a	Renault TV	Renault	2012-12-31
—N/a	—N/a	0156	—N/a	Calvary Chapel Radio	Calvary Chapel	2012-12-31

==== 2013 ====
DTT/IPTV	Freesat	Sky	Virgin TV	Channel name	Owner/parent company at the time	Date shutdown	Reason
—N/a	—N/a	756–761	—N/a	Sky Movies Box Office	BSkyB	2013-01-03
—N/a	—N/a	193	—N/a	HiTV	HiTV Ltd.	2013-01-15
—N/a	—N/a	667	—N/a	JML Cookshop	JML Direct Ltd.	2013-01-18	Sky EPG slot bought by Sparkle TV.
—N/a	—N/a	917	—N/a	Filth	Northern & Shell	2013-01-24	Sky EPG slot bought by The Mall. Returned on 20 November 2013.
—N/a	—N/a	0142	—N/a	RTÉ Radio 1 Extra	Raidió Teilifís Éireann	2013-01-31
179	—N/a	—N/a	—N/a	Bluebird TV	Vervloet Management & Beheer	2013-02-06	Failed to launch.
—N/a	—N/a	822	—N/a	Music India	Media Worldwide Pvt. Ltd.	2013-02-18	Sky EPG slot bought by PTC Punjabi. Returned on 1 November 2024.
—N/a	—N/a	830	—N/a	Sunrise TV	Sunrise TV Ltd.	2013-02-27
—N/a	—N/a	—N/a	974	Sunrise Radio	Sunrise Radio Group	2013-03-01	Removed from Sky on 27 February 2013. Cost-saving measure.
—N/a	—N/a	0187	—N/a	Punjabi Radio	Sunrise Radio Group	2013-03-05	Cost-saving measure.
—N/a	907	—N/a	—N/a	BoxOffice365	British Internet Broadcasting Company	2013-03-11
—N/a	—N/a	0159	—N/a	Family Radio	Family Stations Inc.	2013-03-15
—N/a	—N/a	0173	—N/a	Kismat Radio	Sunrise Radio Group	2013-03-19	Cost-saving measure.
102/852	109	169	187	BBC HD	BBC	2013-03-25	Replaced with BBC Two HD on 26 March 2013.
—N/a	—N/a	622	728	Disney Cinemagic	Disney-ABC Television Group	2013-03-27	Content licensed to BSkyB to create Sky Movies Disney, which later launched on 28 March 2013.
—N/a	—N/a	628	—N/a	Disney Cinemagic +1	Disney-ABC Television Group	2013-03-27	Content licensed to BSkyB to create Sky Movies Disney, which later launched on 28 March 2013.
—N/a	—N/a	631	—N/a	Disney Cinemagic HD	Disney-ABC Television Group	2013-03-27	Content licensed to BSkyB to create Sky Movies Disney, which later launched on 28 March 2013.
—N/a	—N/a	311	411	Sky Movies Classics	BSkyB	2013-03-27	Content merged into Sky Movies Greats and Sky Movies Select on 28 March 2013 to facilitate the launch of Sky Movies Disney.
—N/a	—N/a	340	441	Sky Movies Classics HD	BSkyB	2013-03-27	Content merged into Sky Movies Greats and Sky Movies Select on 28 March 2013 to facilitate the launch of Sky Movies Disney.
871	—N/a	240	271	Discovery Real Time	Discovery Networks Western Europe	2013-04-30	Replaced with TLC. Sky EPG slot given to Discovery Home & Health.
—N/a	—N/a	241	272	Discovery Real Time +1	Discovery Networks Western Europe	2013-04-30	Replaced with TLC +1. Sky EPG slot given to Discovery Home & Health +1.
—N/a	—N/a	265	273	Discovery Travel & Living	Discovery Networks Western Europe	2013-04-30	Replaced with Investigation Discovery +1.
—N/a	—N/a	195	—N/a	DMAX +2	Discovery Networks Western Europe	2013-04-30	Sky EPG slot given to TLC +1.
—N/a	—N/a	914	—N/a	Extreme	Playboy Enterprises	2013-04-30	Sky EPG slot given to Climax.
—N/a	—N/a	934	—N/a	GirlGirl	Playboy Enterprises	2013-04-30
—N/a	809	653	—N/a	JML Living	JML Direct Ltd.	2013-05-01	Replaced with The Boutique. Returned on 13 May 2013.
—N/a	804	657	—N/a	Pitch World	Pitch World Ltd.	2013-05-01	Entered administration. Replaced by Discount TV.
—N/a	—N/a	824	—N/a	AAG TV	Independent Media Corporation	2013-05-03	Replaced with Geo Tez.
—N/a	—N/a	445	—N/a	Sailing 1	BT Group	2013-05-03	Replaced with BT Sport 1.
—N/a	—N/a	447	—N/a	Sailing 2	BT Group	2013-05-03	Replaced with BT Sport 2.
—N/a	—N/a	531	236	Military History	A+E Networks UK (A+E Networks/BSkyB)	2013-05-04	Replaced with H2.
716	—N/a	—N/a	—N/a	Q Radio	Bauer Radio	2013-05-07	Replaced with Kisstory.
—N/a	—N/a	871	—N/a	GayXchange	Euro Digital Corporation Limited	2013-05-09
54/55	—N/a	642	—N/a	Argos TV	Argos Limited (Home Retail Group)	2013-05-13	Sky EPG slot given to JML Living. Removed from Freesat on 9 May.
—N/a	—N/a	198	—N/a	Horror Channel	CBS Chellozone UK Channels Partnership	2013-05-21	Was a simulcast of Horror Channel with a Psychic Today block. Replaced with Reality TV, a simulcast of CBS Reality with a Psychic Today block.
—N/a	—N/a	266	—N/a	Wedding TV	Creamdove Limited	2013-05-21
—N/a	803	646	—N/a	Pitch TV	Pitch World Ltd.	2013-05-22	Entered administration. Replaced by Armchair Shop.
—N/a	—N/a	851	—N/a	9XM	9X Media	2013-05-31	Low audience ratings.
—N/a	—N/a	237	—N/a	True Entertainment +1	CSC Media Group	2013-06-04	Replaced by True Drama. Returned on 3 April 2014.
—N/a	—N/a	0185	—N/a	Spectrum Radio	Spectrum Radio Ltd	2013-06-07	Replaced by Diamond Radio.
—N/a	—N/a	798	811	Zee Café	Zee Entertainment Enterprises	2013-06-10	Replaced by Lamhe.
—N/a	—N/a	430	—N/a	Premier Sports Xtra	Premier Media	2013-06-13	Great Britain only. Sky EPG slot sold to the Muslim World Network.
792	—N/a	—N/a	—N/a	R13	Ravensbourne	2013-06-13	Temporary channel for The Degree Show 2013. South east London only.
793	—N/a	—N/a	—N/a	R13 HD	Ravensbourne	2013-06-13	Temporary channel for The Degree Show 2013. South east London only.
—N/a	—N/a	919	—N/a	Dirty Talk	Northern & Shell	2013-06-17	Sky EPG slot sold to TVC News. Returned on 20 November 2013.
—N/a	—N/a	817	—N/a	Sahara One	Sahara One Media and Entertainment Ltd.	2013-07-02	Sky EPG slot sold to ABP News.
—N/a	—N/a	534	206	Blighty	UKTV (BBC Worldwide/Scripps Networks Interactive)	2013-07-05	Replaced by Drama.
302	982	—N/a	992	BBC Red Button 2	BBC	2013-07-08	"Best of" service launched in June 2013 off the Sky EPG, then closed the following month.
—N/a	983	—N/a	993	BBC Red Button 3	BBC	2013-07-08	"Best of" service launched in June 2013 off the Sky EPG, then closed the following month.
—N/a	—N/a	656	—N/a	TGGC Outlet	Genuine Gemstone Company	2013-07-15	Replaced with High Street Xtra.
232	901	—N/a	—N/a	The Space	BBC/Arts Council England	2013-07-15	Scuzz and itself were replaced with Chart Show Dance on Freesat.
174	—N/a	—N/a	—N/a	Babestation	Cellcast Group	2013-07-19	Ceased broadcasting due to regulatory pressure, moved to an online only model. Differed from the satellite channel.
—N/a	—N/a	629	—N/a	Pop Girl +1	CSC Media Group	2013-07-22	Replaced by Kix Power.
—N/a	—N/a	0209	—N/a	Yorkshire Radio	Leeds United A.F.C.	2013-07-30
—N/a	—N/a	426	531	ESPN America	ESPN Inc. (The Walt Disney Company/Hearst Corporation)	2013-08-01	Purchased by BT Group. Sky EPG slot given to BT Sport 1 HD.
—N/a	—N/a	427	—N/a	ESPN America HD	ESPN Inc. (The Walt Disney Company/Hearst Corporation)	2013-08-01	Purchased by BT Group. Sky EPG slot given to BT Sport 2 HD.
—N/a	—N/a	425	533	ESPN Classic	ESPN Inc. (The Walt Disney Company/Hearst Corporation)	2013-08-01
712	—N/a	—N/a	—N/a	Smash Hits Radio	Bauer Radio	2013-08-05	Replaced with KissFresh.
—N/a	—N/a	519	—N/a	Arise News	Arise Media UK Limited	2013-08-07	Returned on 10 October 2013.
—N/a	—N/a	570	—N/a	Arise News HD	Arise Media UK Limited	2013-08-07	Sky EPG slot bought by BBC News HD.
—N/a	—N/a	318	417	TCM 2	Turner Broadcasting System Europe (Time Warner)	2013-08-13	Replaced with TCM +1.
—N/a	—N/a	677	—N/a	Celebrity Shop	Guthy-Renker UK Ltd.	2013-08-29	Sky EPG slot sold to Alexcasino.
—N/a	—N/a	200	—N/a	Controversial TV	Edge Media	2013-08-30	Sky EPG slot bought by TLC +2.
—N/a	—N/a	665	746	Bid Plus	Bid Shopping	2013-09-01
—N/a	—N/a	657	—N/a	Discount TV	TV Discount Store Limited	2013-09-10	Replaced with TV Warehouse.
—N/a	—N/a	197	—N/a	Bio. +1	A+E Networks UK (A+E Networks/British Sky Broadcasting)	2013-09-16	Replaced with Lifetime +1.
—N/a	—N/a	232	—N/a	Klear TV	Millenium Media House Limited	2013-09-18
—N/a	—N/a	0184	—N/a	Star Beats		2013-09-24
—N/a	—N/a	—N/a	—N/a	Radio Caroline		2013-10-01	Ceased broadcasting on satellite due to financial problems.
—N/a	809	642	—N/a	JML Living	JML Direct TV	2013-10-01	Replaced with The Store.
177	—N/a	—N/a	—N/a	Babestation 2	Cellcast Group	2013-10-12
—N/a	—N/a	935	—N/a	Northern Birds	Satellite Entertainment Ltd.	2013-10-17	Closed due to Satellite Entertainment Ltd. entering administration. Sky EPG slot bought by Dirty Talk.
—N/a	—N/a	936	—N/a	Essex Babes	Satellite Entertainment Ltd.	2013-10-17	Closed due to Satellite Entertainment Ltd. entering administration. Sky EPG slot bought by Fantasy.
—N/a	—N/a	940	—N/a	SportxxxGirls	Satellite Entertainment Ltd.	2013-10-17	Closed due to Satellite Entertainment Ltd. entering administration. Sky EPG slot bought by Filth.
—N/a	—N/a	942	—N/a	LivexxxBabes	Satellite Entertainment Ltd.	2013-10-17	Closed due to Satellite Entertainment Ltd. entering administration. Sky EPG slot bought by Flirt TV.
—N/a	—N/a	378	—N/a	Greatest Hits TV	UltimateHits Limited	2013-10-23	Replaced with NOW Music.
206	—N/a	—N/a	—N/a	Sky Text	BSkyB	2013-10-30	Red button functionality removed on DTT and Sky platforms. Placeholder removed on 3 December 2013 on DTT.
304	—N/a	—N/a	—N/a	TopUp Anytime1	Top Up TV	2013-10-31	Removed with closure of Top Up TV.
305	—N/a	—N/a	—N/a	TopUp Anytime3	Top Up TV	2013-10-31	Removed with closure of Top Up TV.
306	—N/a	—N/a	—N/a	TopUp Anytime5	Top Up TV	2013-10-31	Removed with closure of Top Up TV.
307	—N/a	—N/a	—N/a	TopUp Anytime6	Top Up TV	2013-10-31	Removed with closure of Top Up TV.
—N/a	—N/a	273	—N/a	Luxury Life	Luxury Broadcasting Limited	2013-11-01
—N/a	—N/a	156	—N/a	Bio.	A+E Networks UK (A+E Networks/British Sky Broadcasting)	2013-11-04	Replaced with Lifetime.
303	980	977	994	BBC Red Button HD	BBC	2013-11-25	HD "best of" service launched in June 2013 off the Sky EPG, then added to Sky, then removed from all platforms after the 50th anniversary of Dr Who.
—N/a	—N/a	786	—N/a	Bangla TV		2013-12-03	Removed for the festive season. Returned on 10 February 2014.
—N/a	—N/a	596	—N/a	SonLife Broadcasting Network	Jimmy Swaggart Ministries	2013-12-06	Removed for the festive season. Returned on 16 January 2014.
—N/a	—N/a	253	285	Style Network	NBCUniversal	2013-12-09	Replaced with E! +1, which swapped Sky EPG slots with E! HD.
—N/a	—N/a	857	—N/a	Muslim World Network		2013-12-13	Removed for the festive season. Returned on 10 February 2014 as TV99.
—N/a	—N/a	498	—N/a	Primetime	Northern & Shell	2013-12-21	Licence transferred to SonLife Broadcasting Network.

==== 2014 ====
DTT/IPTV	Freesat	Sky	Virgin TV	Channel name	Owner/parent company at the time	Date shutdown	Reason
—N/a	—N/a	940	—N/a	Filth	Northern & Shell	2014-01-13	Replaced with Play TV 2.
—N/a	—N/a	313	—N/a	MGM HD	MGM Holdings	2014-01-15	Content licensed to BSkyB.
50	—N/a	—N/a	—N/a	Marketplace	TopUp TV	2014-02-01	Capacity handed back to Channel 5 and now used for Channel 5 +24.
—N/a	132	219	152	5* +1	Viacom International Media Networks Europe	2014-02-03	Replaced with Channel 5 +24. Sky EPG slot given to 5USA +1. Returned on 16 September 2014, but only on Freesat.
—N/a	—N/a	940	—N/a	Play TV 2	Northern & Shell	2014-02-07
—N/a	—N/a	823	—N/a	JeemTV	Al Jazeera Media Network	2014-02-18	Financial problems.
302	982	978	992	BBC Red Button 2	BBC	2014-02-24	Temporary channel for the 2014 Winter Olympics.
—N/a	—N/a	193	—N/a	Showcase +1	Information TV Ltd.	2014-02-27	Replaced with ITV4 Plus.
—N/a	—N/a	602	705	Cartoon Network Too	Turner Broadcasting System Europe (Time Warner)	2014-04-01	Replaced by Cartoon Network +1.
—N/a	505	372	—N/a	BuzMuzik	CSC Media Group	2014-04-03	Replaced with True Entertainment +1 on Sky and Starz TV on Freesat due to CSC buying Starz TV to their list which has similar content to this channel. Sky EPG slot given to Chart Show Dance.
—N/a	—N/a	442	—N/a	Trace Sports Stars	Trace TV	2014-04-17
23	802	645	745	Shop at Bid	Bid Shopping	2014-04-17	Closed due to Bid Shopping entering administration. Removed from Freesat on 17 April, then Virgin Media on 23 April, then Freeview and Sky on 25 April.
37	801	654	741	Price Drop	Bid Shopping	2014-04-17	Closed due to Bid Shopping entering administration. Removed from Freesat on 17 April, then Virgin Media on 23 April, then Freeview and Sky on 25 April.
—N/a	—N/a	0146	—N/a	Real Radio	Real and Smooth Radio Ltd. (Global Radio)	2014-04-22	Replaced with The Arrow because of all Real Radio stations becoming Heart on 6 May.
—N/a	—N/a	995	—N/a	Sky Channel 995	British Sky Broadcasting	2014-04-30
—N/a	—N/a	193	—N/a	ITV4 Plus	ITV Digital Channels Ltd. (ITV plc)	2014-05-07	Replaced with ITV Encore.
—N/a	—N/a	938	—N/a	Flirt TV	Northern & Shell	2014-05-18	Returned on 19 November 2014.
—N/a	—N/a	935	—N/a	Dirty Talk	Northern & Shell	2014-06-02
—N/a	—N/a	295	—N/a	Information TV +1	Information TV Ltd.	2014-06-12	Replaced with Showcase 3. Returned on 29 July 2014.
—N/a	690	587	—N/a	Inspiration	The Inspiration Network	2014-06-16	Returned on 22 July 2014.
—N/a	—N/a	834	—N/a	Channel 9 UK	Runners TV Ltd.	2014-06-27	Replaced with Iqra Bangla.
—N/a	986	986	996	BBC Red Button HD	BBC	2014-07-07	Temporary channel for the 2014 Wimbledon Championships and Glastonbury Festival. Returned on 21 July 2014.
—N/a	—N/a	629	—N/a	Kix +	CSC Media Group	2014-07-14	Replaced with Pop +1.
—N/a	—N/a	936	—N/a	Fantasy	Northern & Shell	2014-07-28
—N/a	—N/a	875	—N/a	Showcase 3	Information TV Limited	2014-07-29	Replaced with Information TV +1.
—N/a	—N/a	870	—N/a	Dating Channel	Euro Digital Corporation Limited	2014-08-01	Sky EPG slot bought by Babes From TV.
—N/a	980	980	990	BBC Red Button 0	BBC	2014-08-04	Temporary channel for the 2014 Commonwealth Games.
302	982	982	992	BBC Red Button 2	BBC	2014-08-04	Temporary channel for the 2014 Wimbledon Championships, Glastonbury Festival and the 2014 Commonwealth Games. Freeview version closed on 7 August 2014.
—N/a	983	983	993	BBC Red Button 3	BBC	2014-08-04	Temporary channel for the 2014 Wimbledon Championships, Glastonbury Festival and the 2014 Commonwealth Games.
—N/a	984	984	994	BBC Red Button 4	BBC	2014-08-04	Temporary channel for the 2014 Wimbledon Championships, Glastonbury Festival and the 2014 Commonwealth Games.
—N/a	985	985	995	BBC Red Button 5	BBC	2014-08-04	Temporary channel for the 2014 Wimbledon Championships, Glastonbury Festival and the 2014 Commonwealth Games.
—N/a	986	986	996	BBC Red Button HD	BBC	2014-08-04	Temporary channel for the 2014 Commonwealth Games.
—N/a	—N/a	916	—N/a	Cheeky Chat	Northern & Shell	2014-08-07
—N/a	—N/a	449	—N/a	The Active Channel	Active Channel Limited	2014-10-08
—N/a	—N/a	932	—N/a	Red Light 3	Playboy Enterprises	2014-10-14	Sky EPG slot bought by Fashion One.
—N/a	—N/a	863	—N/a	Smart Live Casino	Smart TV Broadcasting Ltd	2014-10-16
—N/a	141	190	—N/a	BET +1	Viacom	2014-11-04	Sky EPG slot given to 5* +1.
—N/a	—N/a	842	—N/a	TV99	East and West Entertainment	2014-11-26	Removed for the festive season. Returned on 22 December 2014.
—N/a	—N/a	841	—N/a	Zee News	Zee Entertainment Enterprises	2014-12-05
—N/a	—N/a	946	—N/a	Flirt TV	Northern & Shell	2014-12-05
—N/a	—N/a	596	—N/a	ACBN	ACBN International Ltd.	2014-12-18	Removed for the festive season. Returned on 12 January 2015.

==== 2015 ====
DTT/IPTV	Freesat	Sky	Virgin TV	Channel name	Owner/parent company at the time	Date shutdown	Reason
3	—N/a	103	103	ITV Central South	ITV plc	2015-02-02	Merged with ITV Meridian - seen in the Oxford area.
3	—N/a	103	103	ITV Central South West	ITV plc	2015-02-02	Merged with ITV Central West - seen in Herefordshire area.
—N/a	—N/a	0188	—N/a	Insight Radio		2015-02-09	Replaced by Absolute Radio 70s
—N/a	—N/a	596	—N/a	ACBN	ACBN International Ltd.	2015-02-24
—N/a	—N/a	997	—N/a	Sky HD Retail Info	Sky plc	2015-02-27
—N/a	—N/a	861	—N/a	Sky Poker	Sky plc	2015-03-20	Great Britain only.
—N/a	—N/a	864	—N/a	Alexcasino	Monte Carlo Ltd.	2015-03-20
—N/a	—N/a	913	—N/a	Red Light 2	Playboy Enterprises	2015-03-26	Sky EPG slot given to My Ex-Girlfriends.
—N/a	809	652	—N/a	BeachBody	JML Direct TV	2015-03-30	Sky EPG slot bought by TJC.
—N/a	—N/a	890	—N/a	Psychics Live	Txt Me TV Limited	2015-03-31
—N/a	—N/a	944	—N/a	Cruzr TV	Txt Me TV Limited	2015-03-31
—N/a	—N/a	795	811	Lamhe	Zee Entertainment Enterprises	2015-04-02	Replaced with &TV.
—N/a	—N/a	942	—N/a	Switch TV	Northern & Shell	2015-04-07	Sky EPG slot bought by Sin TV.
—N/a	—N/a	582	—N/a	TBN Europe	Trinity Broadcasting Network	2015-04-17	Replaced with TBN UK (which launched on Freeview on 5 January).
—N/a	—N/a	254	—N/a	FAB TV	TV Worx Limited (Fitness & Beauty TV)	2015-04-23
—N/a	—N/a	920	—N/a	ElectricBLUE	Northern & Shell	2015-04-30
—N/a	—N/a	921	—N/a	Girl Next Door	Northern & Shell	2015-04-30
—N/a	—N/a	922	—N/a	Viewers' Wives	Northern & Shell	2015-04-30	Returned on 7 January 2016 as a rebrand of Red Hot Amateur.
—N/a	—N/a	923	—N/a	XXXCESS	Northern & Shell	2015-04-30
—N/a	—N/a	198	—N/a	Reality TV	CBS AMC Networks UK Channels Partnership	2015-05-05	Sky EPG slot given to TruTV.
—N/a	—N/a	457	—N/a	Angling TV	BT Group	2015-05-18	Placeholder channel. Replaced with BT Preview.
—N/a	—N/a	265	—N/a	Information TV +1	Information TV Limited	2015-05-29
—N/a	—N/a	238	—N/a	Showcase +1	Information TV Limited	2015-06-01	Replaced with Property Show.
306	—N/a	130	283	Sky Arts 2	Sky plc	2015-06-09	Merged with Sky Arts 1 to form a single channel. Sky EPG slot bought by Sky1 +1.
—N/a	—N/a	262	284	Sky Arts 2 HD	Sky plc	2015-06-09	Merged with Sky Arts 1 HD to form a single channel.
—N/a	—N/a	170	—N/a	Sky 3D	Sky plc	2015-06-09	Sky EPG slot bought by Sky Atlantic +1.
—N/a	—N/a	0185	—N/a	Diamond Radio	Spectrum Radio Ltd	2015-06-16	Replaced with Ahomka Radio.
—N/a	—N/a	584	—N/a	UCB TV	United Christian Broadcasters	2015-07-01	Removed by United Christian Broadcasters.
—N/a	—N/a	0125	914	UCB UK	United Christian Broadcasters	2015-07-01	Removed by United Christian Broadcasters. Replaced with Apni Awaz.
—N/a	—N/a	0134	—N/a	UCB Bible	United Christian Broadcasters	2015-07-01	Removed by United Christian Broadcasters.
—N/a	—N/a	0135	—N/a	UCB Gospel	United Christian Broadcasters	2015-07-01	Removed by United Christian Broadcasters.
—N/a	—N/a	0136	—N/a	UCB Inspiration	United Christian Broadcasters	2015-07-01	Removed by United Christian Broadcasters.
—N/a	—N/a	662	—N/a	Equal World	Equal World Foundation	2015-07-03	Sky EPG slot bought by High Street TV 2.
—N/a	980	980	990	BBC Red Button HD	BBC	2015-07-14	Temporary channel for the 2015 Wimbledon Championships.
—N/a	982	982	992	BBC Red Button 2	BBC	2015-07-14	Temporary channel for the 2015 Wimbledon Championships.
—N/a	983	983	993	BBC Red Button 3	BBC	2015-07-14	Temporary channel for the 2015 Wimbledon Championships.
—N/a	984	—N/a	994	BBC Red Button 4	BBC	2015-07-14	Temporary channel for the 2015 Wimbledon Championships.
—N/a	985	—N/a	995	BBC Red Button 5	BBC	2015-07-14	Temporary channel for the 2015 Wimbledon Championships.
—N/a	986	—N/a	996	BBC Red Button 6	BBC	2015-07-14	Temporary channel for the 2015 Wimbledon Championships.
—N/a	—N/a	852	—N/a	Ramadan TV	Information TV Limited	2015-07-20	Temporary channel.
—N/a	—N/a	261	—N/a	True Entertainment +1	Sony Pictures Television	2015-08-17	Sky EPG slot bought by Showcase. Replaced with AMC from BT. Returned on 30 September 2016.
—N/a	—N/a	931	—N/a	Hot Chat TV	Txt Me TV Limited	2015-08-26
—N/a	—N/a	943	—N/a	Flirt and Chat	Playboy Enterprises	2015-08-26
—N/a	—N/a	663	—N/a	JVP Products	The Broadcast House Limited	2015-08-27	Replaced with Hochanda.
—N/a	—N/a	720–731	—N/a	Sky Movies Box Office	Sky plc	2015-09-01
—N/a	—N/a	754	—N/a	Sky Movies Box Office	Sky plc	2015-09-01
—N/a	—N/a	755	—N/a	Sky Movies Box Office	Sky plc	2015-09-01
—N/a	—N/a	209	293	The Africa Channel International	The Africa Channel plc	2015-09-29
—N/a	604	626	—N/a	Pop Girl	Sony Pictures Television	2015-10-01	Replaced by Kix +1.
—N/a	—N/a	0146	—N/a	The Arrow	Global Group	2015-10-01	Replaced with Smooth Extra.
—N/a	—N/a	274	—N/a	Property Show +3	Information TV Limited	2015-10-05
—N/a	—N/a	942	—N/a	Sin TV	Relativity Marketing Ltd	2015-10-19
—N/a	—N/a	854	—N/a	Ummah Channel +1	Ummah Channel Ltd	2015-11-11	Replaced with Muslim Ummah.
—N/a	—N/a	376	—N/a	Bliss	Sony Pictures Television	2015-11-27

==== 2016 ====
DTT/IPTV	Freesat	Sky	Virgin TV	Channel name	Owner/parent company at the time	Date shutdown	Reason
—N/a	—N/a	272	—N/a	Property Show +2	Information TV Limited	2016-01-07
—N/a	—N/a	849	—N/a	Islam TV Urdu	Esplanade Vale Media Ltd	2016-01-11	Replaced with TV One.
—N/a	—N/a	389	—N/a	Planet	All Around the World Productions	2016-01-18
—N/a	—N/a	252	—N/a	?TV	AMC Networks International Zone	2016-01-26	Sky EPG slot bought by Wellbeing Network.
—N/a	—N/a	358	—N/a	MTV Live	Viacom International Media Networks Europe	2016-02-15	Replaced with MTV Music +1.
7	106	115	106	BBC Three	BBC	2016-02-15	Became an online TV channel on 16 February 2016. Returned on 1 February 2022.
105	147	210	163	BBC Three HD	BBC	2016-02-15	Became an online TV channel on 16 February 2016. Returned on 1 February 2022.
—N/a	—N/a	0124	921	LBC News 1152	Global Radio	2016-02-29	Replaced with Heart Extra, which swapped Sky EPG slots with LBC.
—N/a	—N/a	862	—N/a	SuperCasino	Netplay TV Broadcasting Ltd	2016-03-02	Great Britain only.
—N/a	—N/a	0125	—N/a	Apni Awaz	Radio Apni Awaz	2016-03-07
—N/a	143	185	—N/a	More Than Movies	Sony Pictures Television	2016-03-22	Replaced with True Crime.
—N/a	156	186	—N/a	More Than Movies +1	Sony Pictures Television	2016-03-22	Replaced with True Crime +1.
—N/a	—N/a	199	—N/a	Open Heaven TV	Open Heavens Media Ltd	2016-04-01	Sky EPG slot given to YourTV.
—N/a	—N/a	424	—N/a	Setanta Sports 1	Setanta Sports	2016-04-07	Northern Ireland only.
—N/a	—N/a	460	—N/a	Setanta Sports 1 HD	Setanta Sports	2016-04-07	Northern Ireland only. Sky EPG slot bought by Premier Sports HD.
—N/a	691	583	—N/a	Daystar	Daystar Television Network	2016-05-09	Decided to broadcast in HD only. Sky EPG slot bought by Eman Channel.
—N/a	—N/a	717	—N/a	Sky Movies Box Office	Sky plc	2016-06-02
—N/a	—N/a	237	—N/a	FoTV	FilmOn.TV	2016-06-08	Sky EPG slot bought by Home & Leisure TV.
—N/a	—N/a	718	—N/a	Sky Movies Box Office	Sky plc	2016-06-24
—N/a	—N/a	719	—N/a	Sky Movies Box Office	Sky plc	2016-06-24
—N/a	—N/a	386	311	MTV Live HD	Viacom International Media Networks Europe	2016-06-29	Replaced with European version of the channel on Virgin Media. Sky EPG slot bought by Nick Jr. HD.
—N/a	—N/a	808	—N/a	Star Jalsha	STAR TV (21st Century Fox)	2016-07-04	Replaced with Star Utsav.
—N/a	980	980	990	BBC Red Button HD	BBC	2016-07-12	Temporary channel for the 2016 Wimbledon Championships.
—N/a	982	982	992	BBC Red Button 2	BBC	2016-07-14	Temporary channel for the 2016 Wimbledon Championships.
—N/a	983	983	993	BBC Red Button 3	BBC	2016-07-14	Temporary channel for the 2016 Wimbledon Championships.
—N/a	984	984	994	BBC Red Button 4	BBC	2016-07-14	Temporary channel for the 2016 Wimbledon Championships.
—N/a	985	985	995	BBC Red Button 5	BBC	2016-07-14	Temporary channel for the 2016 Wimbledon Championships.
—N/a	986	986	996	BBC Red Button 6	BBC	2016-07-14	Temporary channel for the 2016 Wimbledon Championships.
55	133	175	152	Channel 5 +24	Viacom International Media Networks Europe	2016-08-10	Replaced with My5.
—N/a	261	480	561	BBC Olympics 1 HD	BBC	2016-08-22	Temporary channel for the 2016 Summer Olympics.
608	—N/a	—N/a	—N/a	BBC Olympics 1	BBC	2016-08-22	Temporary channel for the 2016 Summer Olympics.
114	—N/a	—N/a	—N/a	BBC Olympics HD	BBC	2016-08-22	Temporary channel for the 2016 Summer Olympics.
602	272	473	572	BBC Olympics 2	BBC	2016-08-22	Temporary channel for the 2016 Summer Olympics.
—N/a	262	481	562	BBC Olympics 2 HD	BBC	2016-08-22	Temporary channel for the 2016 Summer Olympics.
603	273	474	573	BBC Olympics 3	BBC	2016-08-22	Temporary channel for the 2016 Summer Olympics.
—N/a	263	482	563	BBC Olympics 3 HD	BBC	2016-08-22	Temporary channel for the 2016 Summer Olympics.
604	274	475	574	BBC Olympics 4	BBC	2016-08-22	Temporary channel for the 2016 Summer Olympics.
—N/a	264	483	564	BBC Olympics 4 HD	BBC	2016-08-22	Temporary channel for the 2016 Summer Olympics.
605	275	476	575	BBC Olympics 5	BBC	2016-08-22	Temporary channel for the 2016 Summer Olympics.
—N/a	265	484	565	BBC Olympics 5 HD	BBC	2016-08-22	Temporary channel for the 2016 Summer Olympics.
606	276	477	576	BBC Olympics 6	BBC	2016-08-22	Temporary channel for the 2016 Summer Olympics.
—N/a	266	485	566	BBC Olympics 6 HD	BBC	2016-08-22	Temporary channel for the 2016 Summer Olympics.
607	277	478	577	BBC Olympics 7	BBC	2016-08-22	Temporary channel for the 2016 Summer Olympics.
—N/a	267	486	567	BBC Olympics 7 HD	BBC	2016-08-23	Temporary channel for the 2016 Summer Olympics.
600	278	479	578	BBC Olympics 8	BBC	2016-08-22	Temporary channel for the 2016 Summer Olympics.
—N/a	268	487	568	BBC Olympics 8 HD	BBC	2016-08-22	Temporary channel for the 2016 Summer Olympics.
—N/a	—N/a	945	—N/a	Babes From TV	Square World Communications Ltd	2016-08-22	Sky EPG slot bought by ShowBiz TV +1.
—N/a	—N/a	716	—N/a	Sky Cinema Box Office	Sky plc	2016-09-01
—N/a	—N/a	801	—N/a	TV Record	Record TV Network	2016-09-12	Decided to broadcast in HD only. Sky EPG slot given to TV Record HD.
—N/a	—N/a	854	—N/a	Muslim Ummah TV	Muslim Ummah TV Ltd	2016-09-20	Sky EPG slot bought by Channel 44.
—N/a	—N/a	797	830	UMP Movies	UTV Software Communications	2016-09-29	Sky EPG slot bought by Rishtey Cineplex.
—N/a	153	183	—N/a	True Drama	CSC Media Group (Sony Pictures Television)	2016-09-30	Replaced with True Entertainment +1.
—N/a	303	322	—N/a	True Movies 2	CSC Media Group (Sony Pictures Television)	2016-09-30	Replaced with True Movies +1.
—N/a	—N/a	519	—N/a	Arise News	Arise Media UK Ltd	2016-10-03	Sky EPG slot bought by TRT World.
—N/a	—N/a	571	—N/a	BON TV	BON TV	2016-10-31
—N/a	—N/a	939	—N/a	Storm	Chat Central Ltd	2016-11-01
—N/a	—N/a	257	—N/a	Fashion One	Bigfoot Entertainment	2016-12-05
—N/a	—N/a	252	—N/a	Wellbeing Network	201 Television Ltd	2016-12-14

==== 2017 ====
DTT/IPTV	Freesat	Sky	Virgin TV	Channel name	Owner/parent company at the time	Date shutdown	Reason
721	—N/a	0152	—N/a	BBC Radio Cymru Mwy	BBC Local Radio	2017-01-04	Wales only. Temporary channel.
—N/a	—N/a	743	—N/a	Sky Cinema Box Office	Sky plc	2017-01-06	Placeholder alerting viewers about the closure of the whole Sky Cinema Box Office network.
—N/a	—N/a	752	—N/a	Sky Cinema Box Office HD	Sky plc	2017-01-06	Placeholder alerting viewers about the closure of the whole Sky Cinema Box Office network.
32	—N/a	—N/a	425	Movie Mix	Sony Pictures Television	2017-01-10	Replaced with Sony Movie Channel (see above for what was replaced by Sony Movie Channel on Sky).
86	—N/a	—N/a	—N/a	Viva +1	Viacom International Media Networks Europe	2017-01-10
—N/a	—N/a	—N/a	738	Kix Power	CSC Media Group (Sony Pictures Television)	2017-01-15	Temporary channel.
—N/a	—N/a	700–715	—N/a	Sky Cinema Box Office	Sky plc	2017-01-31	Placeholder alerting viewers about the closure of the whole Sky Cinema Box Office network.
—N/a	—N/a	744	—N/a	Sky Cinema Box Office	Sky plc	2017-01-31	Placeholder alerting viewers about the closure of the whole Sky Cinema Box Office network.
—N/a	—N/a	791	818	ARY Digital	ARY Group	2017-02-02	Licence removed by Ofcom (politically controversial content). Sky EPG slot bought by Jus Punjabi.
—N/a	—N/a	802	819	ARY News	ARY Group	2017-02-02	Licence removed by Ofcom (politically controversial content). Sky EPG slot bought by Sony Mix.
—N/a	—N/a	804	—N/a	ARY Qtv	ARY Group	2017-02-02	Licence removed by Ofcom (politically controversial content). Sky EPG slot bought by New Vision TV.
—N/a	—N/a	186	—N/a	True Crime +1	Sony Pictures Television	2017-02-15	Sky EPG slot bought by TruTV. Returned on 12 February 2019 as a rename of TruTV +1.
—N/a	—N/a	282	—N/a	ShowBiz TV +1	ShowBiz TV & Media Ltd	2017-02-22
—N/a	163	191	—N/a	Irish TV	Teilifís Mhaigh Eo Teoranta	2017-03-08	Sky EPG slot bought by Spike +1.
—N/a	—N/a	241	—N/a	Discovery Home & Health +2	Discovery Networks Northern Europe	2017-03-08	Placeholder channel for Quest Red. Great Britain only.
—N/a	—N/a	242	—N/a	Discovery Shed +1	Discovery Networks Northern Europe	2017-03-08	Placeholder channel for Quest Red +1. Great Britain only.
—N/a	—N/a	0112	921	Heart Extra	Global Group	2017-03-14	Replaced with Heart 80s on UK TV platforms.
80	—N/a	266	—N/a	ShowBiz TV	ShowBiz TV & Media Ltd	2017-03-24	Sky channel slot sold.
—N/a	—N/a	679	—N/a	The Craft Channel	The Craft Channel Ltd	2017-04-11
—N/a	—N/a	261	—N/a	Showcase 3	Information TV Ltd	2017-05-17
—N/a	—N/a	799	—N/a	DM Plus TV	DM Digital Television Ltd	2017-06-12	Sky EPG slot bought by Hum Masala.
—N/a	—N/a	238	—N/a	Showcase +1	Information TV Ltd	2017-06-27	Sky EPG slot bought by TruTV +1.
—N/a	—N/a	237	—N/a	Home & Leisure TV	HSTV Media Ltd	2017-06-30
—N/a	—N/a	902	—N/a	Playboy TV Chat	Playboy Enterprises	2017-06-30	Replaced with Xpanded TV 2.
—N/a	—N/a	421	—N/a	Chelsea TV	Chelsea F.C.	2017-07-01	Decided to broadcast in HD only. Sky EPG slot given to Chelsea TV HD.
—N/a	—N/a	820	—N/a	Ummah Channel	Ummah Channel Ltd	2017-07-31
—N/a	—N/a	509	—N/a	Fox News	Fox International Channels (21st Century Fox)	2017-08-29
—N/a	251	464	552	Bike	Bike Media UK Ltd	2017-09-12	Failed to find an owner.
—N/a	—N/a	862	—N/a	SEE TV		2017-09-29	Sky EPG slot bought to iON TV.
—N/a	—N/a	653	—N/a	GR Shop	Guthy-Renker UK Limited	2017-10-19	Sky EPG slot bought by QVC Style.
—N/a	—N/a	374	—N/a	Flava	CSC Media Group (Sony Pictures Television)	2017-11-01	Unknown reasons.
—N/a	—N/a	821	—N/a	Bangla TV	Bangla TV Ltd	2017-11-02	Sky EPG slot bought to 92 News.
—N/a	—N/a	900	—N/a	Playboy TV	Playboy Enterprises	2017-11-30	Sky EPG slot bought by TVX Pay Per Night.

==== 2018 ====
DTT/IPTV	Freesat	Sky	Virgin TV	Channel name	Owner/parent company at the time	Date shutdown	Reason
—N/a	—N/a	863	—N/a	New Vision TV +1	New Vision TV Ltd	2018-01-01	Replaced with ARY Family.
—N/a	—N/a	681	—N/a	Shopping Nation	???	2018-01-03	Was originally a temporary closure, but then ceased broadcasting.
—N/a	—N/a	808	—N/a	Star Utsav	Star TV (21st Century Fox)	2018-01-04
—N/a	—N/a	572	—N/a	TVC News +1	???	2018-01-05
77	164	539	269	Community Channel	The Community Channel	2018-01-16	Replaced with Together.
—N/a	—N/a	656	—N/a	Tristar		2018-01-28	Replaced with High Street TV 4.
57	511	353	317	Viva	Viacom International Media Networks Europe	2018-01-31	Replaced with MTV Love, a temporary rename for MTV OMG.
—N/a	—N/a	855	—N/a	Al Arabiya	MBC Group	2018-02-03
—N/a	—N/a	—N/a	552	Eurosport 3 HD	Discovery Networks Northern Europe	2018-02-26	Temporary channels for the 2018 Winter Olympics.
—N/a	—N/a	—N/a	553	Eurosport 4 HD	Discovery Networks Northern Europe	2018-02-26	Temporary channels for the 2018 Winter Olympics.
—N/a	—N/a	—N/a	554	Eurosport 5 HD	Discovery Networks Northern Europe	2018-02-26	Temporary channels for the 2018 Winter Olympics.
—N/a	—N/a	872	—N/a	Gay Network	4D Interactive Ltd.	2018-03-06
602	980	981	990	BBC Red Button HD	BBC	2018-04-16	Temporary channel for the 2018 Commonwealth Games.
—N/a	—N/a	200	—N/a	TLC +2	Discovery, Inc.	2018-04-27	Closed due to it being illogical with the new Sky EPG that occurred four days after. Replaced with Discovery Turbo +1.
—N/a	—N/a	123	—N/a	ITV Encore	ITV Digital Channels Ltd (ITV plc)	2018-05-01	Became an on demand service. Sky EPG slot bought by Sky Two.
—N/a	—N/a	263	—N/a	ITV Encore HD	ITV Digital Channels Ltd (ITV plc)	2018-05-01	Became an on demand service.
—N/a	—N/a	268	—N/a	ITV Encore +1	ITV Digital Channels Ltd (ITV plc)	2018-05-01	Became an on demand service.
—N/a	—N/a	284	—N/a	Viceland HD	Vice UK TV Ltd	2018-05-01	Original standard-definition channel renamed to Vice on the same day.
—N/a	—N/a	0205	—N/a	Kanshi Radio	Kanshi Radio Ltd	2018-05-01
—N/a	—N/a	742	—N/a	Glory TV	Glory TV Foundation	2018-05-09
—N/a	—N/a	—N/a	812	Zee Punjabi	Zee Entertainment Enterprises	2018-05-31	Removed from Sky on 19 March 2018, and was replaced by Living Foodz there.
—N/a	—N/a	—N/a	738	Pop Power	CSC Media Group (Sony Pictures Television)	2018-06-04	Temporary channel.
—N/a	—N/a	0188	—N/a	Absolute Radio 70s	Bauer Radio	2018-06-04	Replaced with Hits Radio on Sky.
—N/a	—N/a	670	—N/a	TJC Choice	The Jewellery Channel Ltd	2018-06-20	Replaced with Primal Cure.
—N/a	—N/a	911	—N/a	Dirty Talk	Portland TV Ltd	2018-06-28	Sky EPG slot bought by Paramount Network.
—N/a	—N/a	—N/a	548	BT Sport Showcase	BT Group	2018-06-30
115	—N/a	—N/a	—N/a	BT Sport Showcase HD	BT Group	2018-06-30
8	—N/a	117	159	STV2	STV Group	2018-06-30	Scotland only. Closed due to competition from BBC Scotland, which launched on 24 February 2019. Replaced with That's Scotland on Freeview and Virgin Media.
—N/a	980	980	990	BBC Red Button HD	BBC	2018-07-17	Temporary channel for the 2018 Wimbledon Championships.
602	982	982	992	BBC Red Button 2	BBC	2018-07-17	Temporary channel for the 2018 Wimbledon Championships.
603	983	983	993	BBC Red Button 3	BBC	2018-07-17	Temporary channel for the 2018 Wimbledon Championships.
604	984	984	994	BBC Red Button 4	BBC	2018-07-17	Temporary channel for the 2018 Wimbledon Championships.
605	985	985	995	BBC Red Button 5	BBC	2018-07-17	Temporary channel for the 2018 Wimbledon Championships.
606	986	986	996	BBC Red Button 6	BBC	2018-07-17	Temporary channel for the 2018 Wimbledon Championships.
—N/a	—N/a	512	—N/a	France 24 (English)	France Médias Monde	2018-07-27	Decided to broadcast in HD only. Sky EPG slot bought by France 24 (English) HD.
—N/a	—N/a	292	—N/a	Showcase +1	Information TV Ltd	2018-08-02	Sky EPG slot bought by CLTV.
—N/a	—N/a	367	343	Vintage TV	Vintage Entertainment Ltd	2018-08-07	Removed from all platforms due to carriage costs. Later went into administration.
—N/a	—N/a	752	—N/a	Channel i	Impress Group	2018-08-29	Removed due to missing EPG data.
—N/a	—N/a	514	—N/a	CNC World	China Xinhua News Network Corporation	2018-08-30
—N/a	—N/a	772	—N/a	Urdu1 Europe	Alliance Media FZ LLC	2018-09-14
—N/a	—N/a	429	545	Motorsport.tv	Motorsport Network	2018-10-01	Became an online streaming channel.
—N/a	—N/a	592	—N/a	Olive TV	Zion of the Holy One of Israel Ministries	2018-10-05
—N/a	—N/a	374	—N/a	Heart TV	Global Television (Global Group)	2018-10-11	Removed from Freesat on 10 October 2018.
—N/a	—N/a	375	—N/a	Capital TV	Global Television (Global Group)	2018-10-11	Removed from Freesat on 10 October 2018.
—N/a	—N/a	680	—N/a	V Channel	Avalon Capital Ltd	2018-11-05
—N/a	—N/a	181	—N/a	Sony Crime Channel 2	Sony Pictures Television	2018-11-15	Sky EPG slot bought by Forces TV.
—N/a	—N/a	366	—N/a	Scuzz	CSC Media Group (Sony Pictures Television)	2018-11-15	Sky EPG slot bought by Chart Show Hits.

==== 2019 ====
DTT/IPTV	Freesat	Sky	Virgin TV	Channel name	Owner/parent company at the time	Date shutdown	Reason
—N/a	—N/a	192	—N/a	CLTV	Information TV Limited	2019-01-07
—N/a	—N/a	591	—N/a	Believe TV	Believe TV Station	2019-01-07
—N/a	—N/a	712	—N/a	Jus Punjabi	Jus Broadcasting	2019-01-11
—N/a	—N/a	—N/a	825	TV5MONDE Europe	TV5MONDE, S.A.	2019-01-18	Became an online channel in the UK. Removed from Sky on 30 November 2018. Sky EPG slot bought by MTV Beats.
—N/a	—N/a	—N/a	544	LFCTV	Liverpool F.C.	2019-01-30	Decided to broadcast in HD only. Removed from Sky on 1 June 2018. Sky and Virgin Media EPG slots given to LFCTV HD.
—N/a	—N/a	667	—N/a	Retail Therapy TV	Retail Therapy Media Ltd	2019-01-31	Replaced with High Street TV 5.
2	102	102	102	BBC Two Scotland	BBC Scotland	2019-02-17	Scotland only. Replaced with BBC Scotland, which launched on 24 February 2019.
—N/a	970	970	—N/a	BBC Two Scotland	BBC Scotland	2019-02-17	England, Northern Ireland and Wales only. Replaced with BBC Scotland, which launched on 24 February 2019.
—N/a	—N/a	264	225	Lifetime +1	A&E Networks UK (A&E Networks/Sky plc)	2019-03-07
—N/a	—N/a	777	—N/a	VTV	Vision Television Network	2019-03-13
—N/a	814	681	—N/a	Juwelo UK	Rocks and Co. Productions Limited	2019-03-13	Removed from Sky on 7 January 2019.
—N/a	—N/a	736	—N/a	Sony Mix	Sony Entertainment Network	2019-04-01	Replaced with Sony Max 2
—N/a	—N/a	451	—N/a	Insight HD	TV Entertainment Reality Network	2019-04-05
—N/a	—N/a	185	—N/a	Propeller TV	Xiking Group	2019-04-10	Sky EPG slot bought to Travelxp.
—N/a	—N/a	738	—N/a	A Plus Europe	A Plus TV Limited	2019-04-15	Sky EPG slot bought to B4U Plus
—N/a	—N/a	900	—N/a	TVX Pay Per Night	Portland TV	2019-04-24	Replaced with Television X HD
—N/a	—N/a	905	—N/a	TVX Pay Per Night 2	Portland TV	2019-04-24
—N/a	—N/a	685	—N/a	Shop Now TV		2019-04-25
—N/a	—N/a	925	—N/a	Television X	Portland TV	2019-05-02	Returned on 1 October 2019
—N/a	—N/a	759	—N/a	TV99	East and West Entertainment	2019-05-07
—N/a	—N/a	421	—N/a	eir Sport 1	eir	2019-05-16	Northern Ireland only. Decided to broadcast in HD only on satellite.
—N/a	—N/a	781	—N/a	NTA International	Nigerian Television Authority	2019-05-22
—N/a	—N/a	784	—N/a	Bible TV		2019-05-23
—N/a	—N/a	330	—N/a	ROK +1	Rok Studios (Groupe Canal+)	2019-05-31
—N/a	—N/a	710	813	Zing	Zee Entertainment Enterprises	2019-06-03	Sky EPG slot bought to Republic Bharat.
—N/a	—N/a	716	811	&TV	Zee Entertainment Enterprises	2019-06-03	Sky EPG slot bought to Foodxp.
—N/a	—N/a	754	—N/a	Living Foodz	Zee Entertainment Enterprises	2019-06-03
—N/a	—N/a	—N/a	812	Living Foodz HD	Zee Entertainment Enterprises	2019-06-03
—N/a	—N/a	885	809	Zee TV HD	Zee Entertainment Enterprises	2019-06-03	Replaced with the standard-definition version, which this version replaced when launched, on Virgin Media. Returned on 13 January 2022.
—N/a	—N/a	994	—N/a	Sky Atlantic VIP	BSkyB	2019-06-12
—N/a	—N/a	995	—N/a	Sky Atlantic VIP HD	BSkyB	2019-06-12
68	—N/a	180	212	True Crime	Sony Pictures Television	2019-07-01	Freeview closure occurred in Manchester only.
69	—N/a	280	—N/a	True Crime +1	Sony Pictures Television	2019-07-01	Freeview closure occurred in Manchester only.
—N/a	—N/a	686	—N/a	Price Crash TV	RHF Productions Limited	2019-07-01
—N/a	980	981	990	BBC Red Button HD	BBC	2019-07-15	Temporary channel for the 2019 Wimbledon Championships.
602	982	982	992	BBC Red Button 2	BBC	2019-07-15	Temporary channel for the 2019 Wimbledon Championships.
603	983	983	993	BBC Red Button 3	BBC	2019-07-15	Temporary channel for the 2019 Wimbledon Championships.
604	984	984	994	BBC Red Button 4	BBC	2019-07-15	Temporary channel for the 2019 Wimbledon Championships.
605	985	985	995	BBC Red Button 5	BBC	2019-07-15	Temporary channel for the 2019 Wimbledon Championships.
606	986	986	996	BBC Red Button 6	BBC	2019-07-15	Temporary channel for the 2019 Wimbledon Championships.
—N/a	—N/a	940	—N/a	Chat Box	4D Interactive Ltd.	2019-08-14
—N/a	—N/a	993	—N/a	Sky Insider HD	BSkyB	2019-09-03
48	142	157	189	True Entertainment	Sony Pictures Television	2019-09-10	Replaced with revival of Sony Channel.
—N/a	152	257	220	True Entertainment +1	Sony Pictures Television	2019-09-10	Replaced with revival of Sony Channel +1.
40	305	323	426	Movies4Men	Sony Pictures Television	2019-09-10	Replaced with Sony Movies Action.
—N/a	—N/a	324	—N/a	Movies4Men +1	Sony Pictures Television	2019-09-10	Replaced with Sony Movies Action +1.
50	303	319	424	True Movies	Sony Pictures Television	2019-09-10	Replaced with Sony Movies Christmas.
62	304	320	—N/a	True Movies +1	Sony Pictures Television	2019-09-10	Replaced with Sony Movies Christmas +1. Freeview change occurred in Manchester only.
313	—N/a	198	278	Good Food	Discovery, Inc.	2019-09-12	Closed following acquisition by Discovery earlier in the year. Programmes moved to the Food Network.
—N/a	—N/a	298	280	Good Food +1	Discovery, Inc.	2019-09-12	Closed following acquisition by Discovery earlier in the year. Programmes moved to the Food Network.
388	—N/a	866	279	Good Food HD	Discovery, Inc.	2019-09-12	Closed following acquisition by Discovery earlier in the year. Programmes moved to the Food Network.
72	—N/a	168	218	YourTV	Fox Networks Group	2019-09-27	Removed from Freesat on 25 September 2019. Programmes moved to Fox.
—N/a	—N/a	713	—N/a	MTV Beats	ViacomCBS Networks UK & Australia	2019-09-30	Sky EPG slot bought by News18.
305	—N/a	170	160	Real Lives	Sky UK Ltd	2019-10-01	Replaced with Sky Crime. Sky and Virgin Media EPG slots given to Sky Two.
—N/a	—N/a	270	207	Real Lives +1	Sky UK Ltd	2019-10-01	Replaced with Sky Crime +1.
—N/a	—N/a	900	—N/a	Television X HD	Portland TV	2019-10-01	Decided to broadcast in SD only. Replaced with Television X
—N/a	—N/a	189	—N/a	Fascination TV		2019-10-04
—N/a	—N/a	454	—N/a	AIT International	Africa Independent Television	2019-10-15
—N/a	—N/a	279	—N/a	Sony Crime Channel +1	Sony Pictures Television	2019-10-30
—N/a	—N/a	910	—N/a	XXX Brits	Playboy Enterprises	2019-11-01
—N/a	—N/a	919	—N/a	XXX 18 & Dirty	Playboy Enterprises	2019-11-01
—N/a	—N/a	920	—N/a	XXX Swingers	Playboy Enterprises	2019-11-01
—N/a	—N/a	762	—N/a	Prime TV	Prime TV Ltd	2019-11-07
—N/a	—N/a	721	—N/a	B4U Plus	B4U Network Limited	2019-11-11
—N/a	—N/a	753	—N/a	Safeer TV	Safeer TV	2019-11-15
—N/a	—N/a	740	—N/a	Peace TV	Zakir Naik	2019-11-19	Licences surrendered before being revoked by Ofcom.
—N/a	—N/a	747	—N/a	Peace TV Urdu	Zakir Naik	2019-11-19	Licences surrendered before being revoked by Ofcom.
—N/a	—N/a	456	—N/a	ABN TV	Allied Broadcasting Network Ltd	2019-11-21
—N/a	—N/a	452	—N/a	Fame TV	Open Heavens Media Limited	2019-12-13

==== 2020 ====
DTT/IPTV	Freesat	Sky	Virgin TV	Channel name	Owner/parent company at the time	Date shutdown	Reason
31	141	150	154	5Spike	ViacomCBS International Media Networks Europe	2020-01-07	Merged with Paramount Network, in a similar move to the US version in 2018.
—N/a	—N/a	250	—N/a	5Spike +1	ViacomCBS International Media Networks Europe	2020-01-07	Replaced with Paramount Network +1, which launched only on Freeview before launching on Sky the next week.
542	—N/a	160	316	VH1	ViacomCBS International Media Networks Europe	2020-01-07	Replaced with MTV Classic on Virgin Media. Sky EPG slot later bought by Smithsonian Channel.
—N/a	—N/a	—N/a	739	ZooMoo HD	Rock Entertainment Holdings	2020-01-07	Temporary channel.
—N/a	—N/a	358	330	Box Upfront	The Box Plus Network (Channel Four Television Corporation)	2020-01-09
—N/a	—N/a	687	—N/a	Sewing Quarter		2020-01-15
320	—N/a	113	122	Universal TV	NBCUniversal International Networks	2020-01-27	Replaced with Sky Comedy.
—N/a	—N/a	213	206	Universal TV +1	NBCUniversal International Networks	2020-01-27
385	—N/a	813	121	Universal TV HD	NBCUniversal International Networks	2020-01-27	Replaced with Sky Comedy HD.
—N/a	—N/a	907	—N/a	Dirty Talk		2020-02-25
—N/a	—N/a	912	—N/a	Studio 66	965 TV Limited	2020-03-05
—N/a	—N/a	686	—N/a	Smart Shop		2020-03-17
—N/a	—N/a	909	—N/a	Meet the Babes		2020-04-15
—N/a	—N/a	612	—N/a	Disney XD +1	Disney Channels Worldwide	2020-04-30	Closed alongside select Disney channels in Europe and Australia. Sky EPG slot given to BabyTV.
—N/a	—N/a	678	—N/a	PaversShoes.tv	Pavers Shoes	2020-04-30
—N/a	147	260	230	Challenge +1	Sky UK Ltd	2020-06-01	Freesat EPG slot given to Pick HD.
—N/a	—N/a	366	—N/a	Trace Latina	Trace Group	2020-06-01	Programmes moved to Trace Urban.
—N/a	—N/a	369	—N/a	Starz TV	Trace Group	2020-06-01	Removed from Freesat on 30 April 2020. Programmes moved to Trace Urban and Trace Vault.
—N/a	—N/a	741	—N/a	Geo Kahani	Independent Media Corporation	2020-06-01	Looked to sell its Sky EPG slot.
—N/a	—N/a	923	—N/a	Studio 66 2	965 TV Limited	2020-06-02
716	—N/a	—N/a	—N/a	Heat Radio	Bauer Radio	2020-06-02	Replaced with Greatest Hits Radio on Freeview.
—N/a	—N/a	179	193	Sony Crime Channel	Sony Pictures Television	2020-06-09
69	—N/a	—N/a	—N/a	CBS Justice +1	CBS AMC Networks UK Channels Partnership	2020-06-22	Closed to help make room on COM7 following closure of COM8 on Freeview.
109	—N/a	—N/a	—N/a	Channel 4 +1 HD	Channel Four Television Corporation	2020-06-22	Closed to help make room on COM7 following closure of COM8 on Freeview.
—N/a	—N/a	719	—N/a	ABP News	ABP Group	2020-06-30
—N/a	—N/a	330	—N/a	OUTtv	OUTtv Media B.V.	2020-06-30
—N/a	—N/a	713	—N/a	News 18	TV18 (Network18 Group)	2020-07-01
—N/a	—N/a	250	—N/a	Paramount Network +1	ViacomCBS Networks UK & Australia	2020-07-14
—N/a	—N/a	226	—N/a	MTV +1	ViacomCBS Networks UK & Australia	2020-07-20
—N/a	—N/a	227	—N/a	Comedy Central Extra +1	Paramount UK Partnership (Paramount British Pictures/Sky UK Ltd)	2020-07-20
—N/a	—N/a	352	318	MTV OMG	ViacomCBS Networks UK & Australia	2020-07-20	Content moved to MTV Hits.
540	—N/a	354	314	Club MTV	ViacomCBS Networks UK & Australia	2020-07-20	Chart based on this channel's former content airing on MTV Base on Fridays.
—N/a	—N/a	356	—N/a	MTV Music +1	ViacomCBS Networks UK & Australia	2020-07-20
541	—N/a	357	315	MTV Rocks	ViacomCBS Networks UK & Australia	2020-07-20	Chart based on this channel's former content airing on MTV Music on Sundays.
—N/a	—N/a	—N/a	293	Horse & Country TV	Horse & Country TV Ltd	2020-07-20	Removed from Sky on 31 January 2020.
—N/a	—N/a	312	412	Sky Cinema Premiere +1	Sky UK Ltd	2020-07-23	Replaced with Sky Cinema Animation. Returned on 6 January 2021.
—N/a	—N/a	199	—N/a	Cruise Channel		2020-07-30
—N/a	—N/a	895	—N/a	Pick HD	Sky UK Ltd	2020-08-04	Removed from Virgin Media on 29 July 2020 and Freesat on 30 July 2020. Temporary channel to air 25 of the remaining 92 Premier League games that were to be played behind closed doors as a result of the Coronavirus pandemic.
—N/a	—N/a	—N/a	289	Travel Channel	Discovery, Inc.	2020-08-27	Removed from Sky on 30 June 2020.
34	—N/a	—N/a	—N/a	Merit	Sky UK Ltd	2020-09-17	Launched by ITV as a vehicle to sell the Freeview channel number. Acquired by Sky for Sky Arts to launch on Freeview. Freeview EPG number swapped with Pick.
—N/a	—N/a	903	—N/a	TVX Bangers	Neon X	2020-09-30
480	—N/a	609	724	Disney Channel	Disney Channels Worldwide	2020-10-01	Closed due to Disney failing to reach a new carriage deal with Sky and Virgin Media. Content shifted to Disney+
—N/a	—N/a	610	725	Disney Channel +1	Disney Channels Worldwide	2020-10-01	Closed due to Disney failing to reach a new carriage deal with Sky and Virgin Media. Content shifted to Disney+
—N/a	—N/a	644	—N/a	Disney Channel HD	Disney Channels Worldwide	2020-10-01	Closed due to Disney failing to reach a new carriage deal with Sky and Virgin Media. Content shifted to Disney+
481	—N/a	607	727	Disney Junior	Disney Channels Worldwide	2020-10-01	Closed due to Disney failing to reach a new carriage deal with Sky and Virgin Media. Content shifted to Disney+
—N/a	—N/a	608	—N/a	Disney Junior +1	Disney Channels Worldwide	2020-10-01	Closed due to Disney failing to reach a new carriage deal with Sky and Virgin Media. Content shifted to Disney+
—N/a	—N/a	643	—N/a	Disney Junior HD	Disney Channels Worldwide	2020-10-01	Closed due to Disney failing to reach a new carriage deal with Sky and Virgin Media. Content shifted to Disney+
482	—N/a	611	707	Disney XD	Disney Channels Worldwide	2020-10-01	Closed due to Disney failing to reach a new carriage deal with Sky and Virgin Media. Content shifted to Disney+
—N/a	—N/a	645	—N/a	Disney XD HD	Disney Channels Worldwide	2020-10-01	Closed due to Disney failing to reach a new carriage deal with Sky and Virgin Media. Content shifted to Disney+

==== 2021 ====
DTT/IPTV	Freesat	Sky	Virgin TV	Channel name	Owner/parent company at the time	Date shutdown	Reason
—N/a	—N/a	190	—N/a	mytv	Record Group	2021-01-05	Sky EPG slot bought by NTD.
—N/a	—N/a	786	—N/a	Abu Dhabi TV	Abu Dhabi Media	2021-01-05
—N/a	—N/a	792	—N/a	Record TV HD	Grupo Record	2021-01-05
—N/a	—N/a	178	287	Discovery Home & Health	Discovery, Inc.	2021-01-06	Content shifted to Discovery+.
—N/a	—N/a	278	291	Discovery Home & Health +1	Discovery, Inc.	2021-01-06	Content shifted to Discovery+.
—N/a	—N/a	192	288	Discovery Shed	Discovery, Inc.	2021-01-06	Content shifted to Discovery+.
505	—N/a	307	—N/a	Sky Cinema Disney	Sky UK Ltd	2021-01-06	Was temporarily renamed Sky Cinema Five Star Movies from 31 December 2020 to 6 January 2021. Replaced with Sky Cinema Premiere +1. Content shifted to Disney+.
519	—N/a	847	405	Sky Cinema Disney HD	Sky UK Ltd	2021-01-06	Was temporarily renamed Sky Cinema Five Star Movies HD from 31 December 2020 to 6 January 2021. Content shifted to Disney+.
—N/a	—N/a	0214	—N/a	UCB Ireland	United Christian Broadcasters	2021-01-06
—N/a	211	509	—N/a	CGTN	China Central Television	2021-02-04	Licence revoked by Ofcom.
—N/a	—N/a	891	—N/a	CGTN HD	China Central Television	2021-02-04	Licence revoked by Ofcom.
83	—N/a	—N/a	—N/a	Together +1	The Community Channel	2021-02-15
329	—N/a	187	—N/a	Lifetime	A+E Networks UK (A&E Networks/Sky UK Ltd)	2021-03-01	Sky EPG slot bought by Blaze in the Channel Islands (which would later be used for That's TV Gold).
384	—N/a	—N/a	208	Lifetime HD	A+E Networks UK (A&E Networks/Sky UK Ltd)	2021-03-01
—N/a	—N/a	760	—N/a	Hum News	Hum Network	2021-03-01
—N/a	—N/a	173	184	BET	ViacomCBS Networks UK & Australia	2021-04-08	Content moved to My5 and Pluto TV.
—N/a	—N/a	524	—N/a	Sky News Floyd Case HD	Sky UK Ltd	2021-04-22	Temporary channel to broadcast the trial of Derek Chauvin on charges of murdering George Floyd in 2020.
—N/a	—N/a	183	—N/a	Vice	Vice TV UK Ltd	2021-04-30
—N/a	—N/a	708	—N/a	Republic Bharat	Worldview Media Network Ltd	2021-05-05
—N/a	—N/a	195	—N/a	BEN		2021-05-06
34	157	142/143	170	Sony Channel	Narrative Entertainment	2021-05-25	Sony Pictures Television UK Networks sold all of its channel To Narrative Entertainment
—N/a	—N/a	421	—N/a	eir Sport 1 HD	eir	2021-06-30	Northern Ireland only. Continued broadcasting in the Republic of Ireland until 28 October 2021.
—N/a	—N/a	914	—N/a	Xpanded TV 2	Txt Me TV Ltd.	2021-06-30
349	—N/a	124	157	Fox	Fox Networks Group (Disney International Operations/Disney UK & Ireland)	2021-07-01	Selected content shifted to Star on Disney+. Sky EPG slot given to Sky Nature.
—N/a	—N/a	224	158	Fox +1	Fox Networks Group (Disney International Operations/Disney UK & Ireland)	2021-07-01	Selected content shifted to Star on Disney+.
364	—N/a	821	199	Fox HD	Fox Networks Group (Disney International Operations/Disney UK & Ireland)	2021-07-01	Selected content shifted to Star on Disney+.
—N/a	—N/a	748	—N/a	Samaa TV	Aleem Khan	2021-07-01	Sky EPG slot bought by NEO News. Returned on 18 August 2022.
—N/a	171	186	—N/a	Yanga!	Chiswick Park Studios Limited	2021-07-05
—N/a	982	982	992	BBC Red Button 2	BBC	2021-07-13	Temporary channels for the 2021 Wimbledon Championships.
—N/a	983	983	993	BBC Red Button 3	BBC	2021-07-13	Temporary channels for the 2021 Wimbledon Championships.
—N/a	984	984	994	BBC Red Button 4	BBC	2021-07-13	Temporary channels for the 2021 Wimbledon Championships.
—N/a	985	985	995	BBC Red Button 5	BBC	2021-07-13	Temporary channels for the 2021 Wimbledon Championships.
—N/a	986	986	996	BBC Red Button 6	BBC	2021-07-13	Temporary channels for the 2021 Wimbledon Championships.
—N/a	980	982	990	BBC Red Button HD	BBC	2021-08-09	Temporary channel for the 2021 Wimbledon Championships and the 2020 Summer Olympics.
—N/a	—N/a	983	537	Eurosport 3 HD	Discovery, Inc.	2021-08-09	Temporary channels for the 2020 Summer Olympics. Channels 3-5 returned in 2022 for the Winter Olympics.
—N/a	—N/a	984	538	Eurosport 4 HD	Discovery, Inc.	2021-08-09	Temporary channels for the 2020 Summer Olympics. Channels 3-5 returned in 2022 for the Winter Olympics.
—N/a	—N/a	985	539	Eurosport 5 HD	Discovery, Inc.	2021-08-09	Temporary channels for the 2020 Summer Olympics. Channels 3-5 returned in 2022 for the Winter Olympics.
—N/a	—N/a	986	540	Eurosport 6 HD	Discovery, Inc.	2021-08-09	Temporary channels for the 2020 Summer Olympics. Channels 3-5 returned in 2022 for the Winter Olympics.
—N/a	—N/a	987	541	Eurosport 7 HD	Discovery, Inc.	2021-08-09	Temporary channels for the 2020 Summer Olympics. Channels 3-5 returned in 2022 for the Winter Olympics.
—N/a	—N/a	988	542	Eurosport 8 HD	Discovery, Inc.	2021-08-09	Temporary channels for the 2020 Summer Olympics. Channels 3-5 returned in 2022 for the Winter Olympics.
—N/a	—N/a	989	543	Eurosport 9 HD	Discovery, Inc.	2021-08-09	Temporary channels for the 2020 Summer Olympics. Channels 3-5 returned in 2022 for the Winter Olympics.
301/340	—N/a	106	110	Sky One	Sky UK Ltd	2021-09-01	Replaced by Sky Showcase as content shifts to Sky Max. Returned 24th February 2026.
—N/a	—N/a	206	—N/a	Sky One +1	Sky UK Ltd	2021-09-01	Replaced by Sky Showcase as content shifts to Sky Max. Returned 24th February 2026.
355	—N/a	806	109	Sky One HD	Sky UK Ltd	2021-09-01	Replaced by Sky Showcase as content shifts to Sky Max. Returned 24th February 2026.
—N/a	—N/a	598	—N/a	Celebration TV		2021-10-19

==== 2022 ====
DTT/IPTV	Freesat	Sky	Virgin TV	Channel name	Owner/parent company at the time	Date shutdown	Reason
—N/a	—N/a	983	523	Eurosport 3 HD	Discovery, Inc.	2022-02-21	Temporary channels for the 2022 Winter Olympics.
—N/a	—N/a	984	524	Eurosport 4 HD	Discovery, Inc.	2022-02-21	Temporary channels for the 2022 Winter Olympics.
—N/a	—N/a	985	525	Eurosport 5 HD	Discovery, Inc.	2022-02-21	Temporary channels for the 2022 Winter Olympics.
234	206	511	—N/a	RT	TV Novosti	2022-03-02	Banned in the European Union as a result of the 2022 Russian invasion of Ukraine. The licence was later revoked by Ofcom and the parent company's British operations are now being liquidated.
113	—N/a	885	—N/a	RT HD	ANO-TV Novosti	2022-03-02	Banned in the European Union as a result of the 2022 Russian invasion of Ukraine. The licence was later revoked by Ofcom and the parent company's British operations are now being liquidated.
—N/a	—N/a	252	229	Syfy +1	NBCUniversal International Networks	2022-03-30
—N/a	145	259	—N/a	Pick +1	Sky UK Ltd	2022-03-30
539	—N/a	352	313	MTV Base	Paramount Global	2022-03-31	Replaced by MTV 90s.
538	—N/a	353	316	MTV Classic	Paramount Global	2022-03-31	Replaced by MTV 80s.
—N/a	—N/a	771	—N/a	KTV	Khalsa TV Ltd	2022-03-31
—N/a	—N/a	748	—N/a	NEO News	FUN infotainment Pvt. Ltd.	2022-06-06
—N/a	—N/a	759	—N/a	A1TV	unknown	2022-06-26
31	181	139	337	4Music	Channel Four Television Corporation	2022-06-29	Replaced with E4 Extra.
—N/a	501	354	336	Box Hits	Channel Four Television Corporation	2022-06-29	Replaced with 4Music.
65	—N/a	—N/a	—N/a	FreeSports	Premier Media	2022-06-30	Closed following closure of COM7 on Freeview. Continues broadcasting on satellite and cable in HD only.
69	137	148	192	CBS Justice	CBS AMC Networks UK Channels Partnership	2022-06-30	Freesat and Sky EPG slots given to Legend and Virgin Media EPG slots given to HorrorXtra.
87	—N/a	—N/a	—N/a	PBS America +1	PBS UK LLC	2022-06-30	Closed following closure of COM7 on Freeview.
96	165	181	274	Forces TV	Services Sound & Vision Corporation	2022-06-30	Closed following closure of COM7 on Freeview.
112	—N/a	—N/a	—N/a	QVC Beauty HD	QVC (Qurate Retail Group)	2022-06-30	Closed following closure of COM7 on Freeview.
—N/a	—N/a	427	554	LaLiga TV HD	Premier Media	2022-06-30
—N/a	982	982	—N/a	BBC Red Button 2	BBC	2022-07-12	Temporary channels for the 2022 Wimbledon Championships.
—N/a	983	983	—N/a	BBC Red Button 3	BBC	2022-07-12	Temporary channels for the 2022 Wimbledon Championships.
—N/a	984	984	—N/a	BBC Red Button 4	BBC	2022-07-12	Temporary channels for the 2022 Wimbledon Championships.
—N/a	985	985	—N/a	BBC Red Button 5	BBC	2022-07-12	Temporary channels for the 2022 Wimbledon Championships.
—N/a	986	986	—N/a	BBC Red Button 6	BBC	2022-07-12	Temporary channels for the 2022 Wimbledon Championships.
—N/a	—N/a	918	—N/a	XXX Mums	MG Global Entertainment (Europe) Ltd	2022-08-01
—N/a	980	987	—N/a	BBC Red Button HD	BBC	2022-08-10	Temporary channel for the 2022 Wimbledon Championships and 2022 Commonwealth Games.
—N/a	—N/a	924	—N/a	Studio 66 3	965 TV Limited	2022-08-01	Closed due to declining viewership, S66Cams closed on 11 November 2022.
—N/a	—N/a	495	—N/a	Prime Video 1	Amazon Prime Video	2022-08-10	Commercial premises only
—N/a	—N/a	496	—N/a	Prime Video 2	Amazon Prime Video	2022-08-10	Commercial premises only
—N/a	—N/a	731	—N/a	MTA1 World	MTA International	2022-12-05	Decided to broadcast in HD only. Sky EPG slot bought by MTA1 World HD.
—N/a	—N/a	0151	—N/a	Scala Radio	Bauer Radio	2022-12-14	Replaced with Greatest Hits Radio on Sky.
415	—N/a	427	546	BoxNation	Boxing Channel Media Ltd	2022-12-14
1	101	101	—N/a	BBC One East (West)	BBC English Regions	2022-12-17	Cambridge region only. Merged with BBC One East (East).
—N/a	954	962	—N/a	BBC One East (West)	BBC English Regions	2022-12-17	UK outside Cambridge. Merged with BBC One East (East).
—N/a	—N/a	—N/a	101	BBC One East (West) HD	BBC English Regions	2022-12-17	Cambridge region only. Merged with BBC One East (East) HD.
1	101	101	—N/a	BBC One Oxfordshire	BBC English Regions	2022-12-17	Oxfordshire region only. Merged with BBC One South.
—N/a	958	965	—N/a	BBC One Oxfordshire	BBC English Regions	2022-12-17	UK outside Oxfordshire. Merged with BBC One South.
—N/a	—N/a	—N/a	101	BBC One Oxfordshire HD	BBC English Regions	2022-12-17	Oxfordshire region only. Merged with BBC One South HD.

==== 2023 ====
DTT/IPTV	Freesat	Sky	Virgin TV	Channel name	Owner/parent company at the time	Date shutdown	Reason
—N/a	—N/a	679	—N/a	Thane	Thane Ltd	2023-01-05
57	175	171	—N/a	Smithsonian Channel	Paramount Networks UK & Australia	2023-01-05	Sky EPG slot given to That's TV.
—N/a	175	843	276	Smithsonian Channel HD	Paramount Networks UK & Australia	2023-01-05	Sky EPG slot given to That's TV.
—N/a	—N/a	793	—N/a	Iran International	Volant Media UK Ltd	2023-02-06	Closed due to increased threats from the Iranian government against Iran International's UK-based journalists
—N/a	—N/a	591	—N/a	Good News TV	Uebert Angel	2023-03-13
80	—N/a	—N/a	—N/a	That's 90s	That's Media Ltd	2023-03-22	Failed to launch. Returned on 30 August 2023 on Freeview and Sky.
101	—N/a	—N/a	—N/a	BBC One HD	BBC	2023-03-22	Generic version with no regional programming broadcasts, and replaced with individual regional variants. Removed from Virgin Media on 26 January 2022 and satellite over the course of January and February 2023. London, Yorkshire, Yorkshire & Lincolnshire, East Midlands, West Midlands and Channel Islands regions only.
101	—N/a	—N/a	—N/a	BBC One HD	BBC	2023-04-26	Generic version with no regional programming broadcasts, and replaced with individual regional variants. Removed from Virgin Media on 26 January 2022 and satellite over the course of January and February 2023. North East & Cumbria, North West, East, South East, South, West and South West regions only.
69	—N/a	—N/a	—N/a	RealityXtra2	CBS AMC Networks UK Channels Partnership	2023-04-26	Freeview EPG slot given to HorrorXtra.
—N/a	—N/a	359	—N/a	Trace Hits	Trace Group	2023-04-27	Sky EPG slot given to That's 90s.
—N/a	—N/a	175	—N/a	ARISEplay		2023-05-30
—N/a	—N/a	—N/a	300	New Music On Demand	Virgin Media	2023-06-08
—N/a	—N/a	425	—N/a	GINX eSports TV	GINX TV Ltd (Sky Group(Comcast)/ITV plc)	2023-06-29
51	—N/a	—N/a	—N/a	Ideal World	Ideal Shopping Direct plc	2023-07-03	Gone into administration. Removed from Virgin Media on 3 June 2023. Returned on 29 September 2023.
—N/a	812	664	—N/a	Ideal World HD	Ideal Shopping Direct plc	2023-07-03	Gone into administration. Sky EPG slot given to QVC Style HD.
—N/a	—N/a	671	—N/a	Ideal Extra	Ideal Shopping Direct plc	2023-07-03	Gone into administration. Sky EPG slot given to QVC Extra.
—N/a	—N/a	756	—N/a	Channel 44	City News Network (SMC) Pvt Ltd	2023-07-03
—N/a	—N/a	315	—N/a	TCM Movies	Turner Broadcasting System Europe (Warner Bros. Discovery)	2023-07-06	Some former film content from the channel moved to Quest.
—N/a	—N/a	316	417	TCM Movies +1	Turner Broadcasting System Europe (Warner Bros. Discovery)	2023-07-06	Some former film content from the channel moved to Quest.
—N/a	—N/a	—N/a	415	TCM Movies HD	Turner Broadcasting System Europe (Warner Bros. Discovery)	2023-07-06	Some former film content from the channel moved to Quest.
—N/a	—N/a	735	—N/a	PTV Global	Pakistan Television Corporation	2023-07-17	Returned on 6 September 2023.
203	602	612	734	CITV	ITV Digital Channels Ltd (ITV plc)	2023-09-01	Closed and programming moved to streaming service ITVX. In addition to this, it was also announced that children's programmes would be broadcast in a morning slot on ITV2.
—N/a	—N/a	—N/a	561-576	Sky Sports Tennis HD 1–16	Sky Group	2023-09-10	Temporary channels to provide additional court coverage of the US Open.
—N/a	—N/a	789	—N/a	Imam Hussein TV 3	Imam Hussein Media Group	2023-09-20
—N/a	810	668	—N/a	TJC Beauty	Vaibhav Global Limited	2023-09-29	Replaced with a new version of Ideal World.
—N/a	—N/a	787	—N/a	Ahlulbayt TV	Ahlulbayt TV Ltd	2023-10-02	Continues to broadcast online to this day.
—N/a	—N/a	505	—N/a	CNBC Europe	NBCUniversal	2023-11-02	Removed from Freesat on 5 October 2023 and Virgin Media on 30 October 2023. Freesat, Sky and Virgin Media EPG slots given to CNBC Europe HD.
—N/a	—N/a	733	—N/a	Hidayat TV	Hidayat Television Ltd	2023-11-30	Continues to broadcast online to this day.
—N/a	—N/a	0110	924	Planet Rock	Bauer Radio	2023-12-13	Removed from Freesat on 12 December 2023.
—N/a	—N/a	0144	951	Absolute Radio 80s	Bauer Radio	2023-12-13	Removed from Freesat on 12 December 2023.
—N/a	—N/a	0145	—N/a	Absolute Radio 90s	Bauer Radio	2023-12-13
—N/a	—N/a	0146	—N/a	Jazz FM	Bauer Radio	2023-12-13
—N/a	—N/a	0148	952	Absolute Classic Rock	Bauer Radio	2023-12-13
—N/a	—N/a	360	—N/a	Trace Vault	Trace Group	2023-12-14	Sky EPG slot bought by That's 80s.
—N/a	—N/a	159	—N/a	E!	Sky Group	2023-12-31	Content available on streaming service hayu. Sky EPG slot bought by DMAX.
—N/a	—N/a	835	160	E! HD	Sky Group	2023-12-31
—N/a	—N/a	—N/a	614	NBC News Now HD	NBCUniversal	2023-12-31	Removed from Sky and EE TV on 7 December 2023.

==== 2024 ====
DTT/IPTV	Freesat	Sky	Virgin TV	Channel name	Owner/parent company at the time	Date shutdown	Reason
—N/a	—N/a	712	—N/a	foodxp	Celebrities Management Pvt. Ltd.	2024-01-23	Sky EPG slot bought by Dangal
—N/a	—N/a	420	553	Viaplay Xtra HD	Viaplay Group	2024-01-25	Sky EPG slot given to Viaplay Sports 2 HD.
—N/a	—N/a	678	—N/a	Direct Store TV	Direct Store TV Ltd	2024-02-01
207	—N/a	615	737	Tiny Pop	Narrative Entertainment UK Limited	2024-03-20	Content moved online on streaming service POP Player. Removed from Freesat on 7 February 2024. Sky EPG slot given to Pop Max. Returned on 21 August 2024.
—N/a	—N/a	618	—N/a	Tiny Pop +1	Narrative Entertainment UK Limited	2024-03-20	Content moved online on streaming service POP Player. Sky EPG slot given to Pop Max +1. Returned on 21 August 2024.
—N/a	—N/a	661	—N/a	JML Direct	JML Direct Limited	2024-03-28	Sky EPG slot given to Home Shop TV.
—N/a	250	427	—N/a	SportyStuff TV HD	Greyhound TV Ltd	2024-04-01
—N/a	—N/a	906	—N/a	XXX Public Pick Ups	MG Global Entertainment (Europe) Ltd	2024-04-01
711	—N/a	—N/a	—N/a	Hits Radio	Bauer Radio	2024-04-02	Removed from Sky on 13 December 2023.
712	—N/a	—N/a	—N/a	Kiss Fresh	Bauer Radio	2024-04-02
713	—N/a	—N/a	—N/a	Kiss	Bauer Radio	2024-04-02	Removed from Sky and Virgin TV on 13 December 2023.
714	—N/a	—N/a	—N/a	Kisstory	Bauer Radio	2024-04-02
715	—N/a	—N/a	—N/a	Magic	Bauer Radio	2024-04-02	Removed from Sky and Virgin TV on 13 December 2023.
716	—N/a	—N/a	—N/a	Greatest Hits Radio	Bauer Radio	2024-04-02	Removed from Sky on 13 December 2023.
717	—N/a	—N/a	—N/a	Kerrang! Radio	Bauer Radio	2024-04-02
—N/a	—N/a	312	—N/a	Sky Cinema Premiere +1	Sky Group	2024-04-30	Sky EPG slot given to Movies 24.
—N/a	217	522	—N/a	TalkTV HD	News UK	2024-05-01
727	—N/a	—N/a	—N/a	Absolute Radio	Bauer Radio	2024-05-10	Removed from Freesat on 12 December 2023 and Sky and Virgin TV on 13 December 2023.
—N/a	—N/a	180	—N/a	EarthxTV HD	Earth Day Texas, Inc.	2024-06-13	Ceased broadcasting on Freeview on 1 June 2024, replaced with Seen on TV the day prior.
—N/a	—N/a	752	—N/a	British Muslim TV	Esplanade Vale Media Limited	2024-06-28
94	814	682	—N/a	Seen on TV	Seen on TV Ltd	2024-06-30	In June 25, the channel lost video signal outright, which removed on Sky afterwards.
—N/a	501	354	286	4Music	Channel Four Television Corporation	2024-07-01	Ceased broadcasting as part of Channel Four Television Corporation's plans to become a digital-first public service streamer by 2030. Sky EPG slot bought by Clubland TV and Virgin TV EPG slot bought by Now 80s.
—N/a	502	355	285	The Box	Channel Four Television Corporation	2024-07-01	Ceased broadcasting as part of Channel Four Television Corporation's plans to become a digital-first public service streamer by 2030. Sky and Virgin TV EPG slots bought by Now 70s.
—N/a	503	356	288	Kiss	Channel Four Television Corporation	2024-07-01	Ceased broadcasting as part of Channel Four Television Corporation's plans to become a digital-first public service streamer by 2030. Sky EPG slot bought by Now 80s and Virgin TV EPG slot bought by Now Rock.
—N/a	504	357	289	Magic	Channel Four Television Corporation	2024-07-01	Ceased broadcasting as part of Channel Four Television Corporation's plans to become a digital-first public service streamer by 2030. Sky EPG slot bought by Now 90s & 00s.
—N/a	505	358	290	Kerrang!	Channel Four Television Corporation	2024-07-01	Ceased broadcasting as part of Channel Four Television Corporation's plans to become a digital-first public service streamer by 2030. Sky EPG slot bought by Now Rock.
—N/a	—N/a	584	—N/a	Inspiration TV	The Inspiration Network	2024-07-01
—N/a	—N/a	754	—N/a	Dunya News	Punjab College	2024-07-01
—N/a	—N/a	429	—N/a	DAZN 1	DAZN	2024-07-08
—N/a	—N/a	495	—N/a	DAZN PPV	DAZN	2024-07-08
—N/a	—N/a	—N/a	829	Goodtimes	Lifestyle and Media Broadcasting Limited	2024-07-08
—N/a	—N/a	740	—N/a	92 News	Mian Muhammad Rasheed	2024-07-29
—N/a	—N/a	905	—N/a	Get Lucky TV	Grandiose Ltd	2024-07-31
61	—N/a	189	—N/a	Great! Real	Narrative Entertainment UK Limited	2024-08-20	Replaced by relaunched version of Tiny Pop.
—N/a	—N/a	289	—N/a	Great! Real +1	Narrative Entertainment UK Limited	2024-08-20	Replaced by relaunched version of Tiny Pop +1.
—N/a	—N/a	594	—N/a	New Media TV	Vision247	2024-08-22
—N/a	—N/a	733	—N/a	PTV Global	Pakistan Television Corporation	2024-08-27
—N/a	—N/a	675	—N/a	High Street TV 4	High Street TV	2024-09-01
—N/a	—N/a	750	—N/a	Siraj TV	Venus TV Ltd	2024-10-01
85	—N/a	673	748	Create & Craft	Hochanda	2024-10-21	Later went into Administration.
—N/a	—N/a	680	—N/a	Craft Extra	Hochanda	2024-10-21	Later went into Administration.
—N/a	—N/a	711	—N/a	Dangal	Enterr10 Television Network Pvt Ltd	2024-11-01	Replaced by Music India
—N/a	—N/a	177	—N/a	Channel 7	GN Media	2024-11-07
—N/a	—N/a	589	—N/a	KICC TV	Kingsway International Christian Centre	2024-11-14
—N/a	—N/a	749	—N/a	Samaa TV	Aleem Khan	2024-12-20

==== 2025 ====
DTT/IPTV	Freesat	Sky	Virgin TV	Channel name	Owner/parent company at the time	Date shutdown	Reason
—N/a	—N/a	761	—N/a	Brit Asia TV	Private Consortium	2025-01-16	Transitioned to BritAsia Digital. Sky EPG slot bought by Panjab TV.
8	—N/a	117	159	London Live	ESTV	2025-01-19	Local TV acquired licence for the channel; replaced by London TV.
—N/a	—N/a	587	—N/a	The Word Network	Adell Broadcasting	2025-02-25
412	—N/a	413	521	Eurosport 1	TNT Sports	2025-02-28	Sky EPG slot bought by TNT Sports 3 and Virgin Media EPG slot bought by TNT Sports 1
413	—N/a	414	522	Eurosport 2	TNT Sports	2025-02-28	Sky EPG slot bought by TNT Sports 4 and Virgin Media EPG slot bought by TNT Sports 2
—N/a	—N/a	791	—N/a	Ramazan TV	Esplanade Vale Media Limited	2025-03-31	Temporary channel.
—N/a	—N/a	223	331	Sky History +1	BSkyB	2025-04-10
—N/a	—N/a	615	—N/a	Pop Max	Narrative Entertainment UK Limited	2025-04-22	Sky EPG slot bought by Tiny Pop.
—N/a	—N/a	628	—N/a	Pop Max +1	Narrative Entertainment UK Limited	2025-04-22
93	—N/a	—N/a	319	ITVBe +1	ITV plc	2025-06-09	Main channel replaced by ITV Quiz, timeshift channel was not and instead removed altogether on Virgin Media.
—N/a	—N/a	523	—N/a	India Today	TV Today Network Ltd	2025-07-01
—N/a	—N/a	711	—N/a	Music India	Worldwide Media Ltd	2025-07-01
7	—N/a	—N/a	159	Notts TV	Notts TV Limited	2025-08-29	Nottinghamshire only. Licence not renewed by the NTU which said that it would expire on 25 November 2025.
—N/a	—N/a	152	156	Sky Replay	Sky Group	2025-10-30	Viewership decline; Sky EPG slot bought by Sky Sci-Fi.
—N/a	—N/a	519	—N/a	WION	Zee Media Corporation Ltd	2025-10-31
—N/a	—N/a	350	280	MTV Music	Paramount Skydance Corporation	2025-12-31	Ceased broadcasting.
—N/a	—N/a	351	282	Club MTV	Paramount Skydance Corporation	2025-12-31	Ceased broadcasting.
—N/a	—N/a	352	283	MTV 90s	Paramount Skydance Corporation	2025-12-31	Ceased broadcasting.
—N/a	—N/a	353	284	MTV 80s	Paramount Skydance Corporation	2025-12-31	Ceased broadcasting.

==== 2026 ====
DTT/IPTV	Freesat	Sky	Virgin TV	Channel name	Owner/parent company at the time	Date shutdown	Reason
—N/a	—N/a	613	736	Pop	Narrative Capital Partners LLC	2026-01-01
—N/a	—N/a	614	—N/a	Tiny Pop	Narrative Capital Partners LLC	2026-01-01
—N/a	—N/a	617	—N/a	Pop +1	Narrative Capital Partners LLC	2026-01-01
—N/a	—N/a	618	—N/a	Tiny Pop +1	Narrative Capital Partners LLC	2026-01-01
44	149	158	191	HGTV	Warner Bros. Discovery	2026-01-13
—N/a	—N/a	258	391	HGTV +1	Warner Bros. Discovery	2026-01-13
—N/a	—N/a	709	—N/a	MATV National	Middlesex Broadcasting Corporation Ltd	2026-02-05
—N/a	—N/a	106	—N/a	Sky Showcase	Sky Group	2026-02-24	Replaced by Sky One (relaunch)
—N/a	—N/a	206	109	Sky Showcase +1	Sky Group	2026-02-24	Replaced by Sky One (relaunch)
—N/a	—N/a	806	109	Sky Showcase HD	Sky Group	2026-02-24	Replaced by Sky One (relaunch)
—N/a	—N/a	113	111	Sky Max	Sky Group	2026-02-24	Replaced by Sky One (relaunch)
—N/a	—N/a	813	—N/a	Sky Max HD	Sky Group	2026-02-24	Replaced by Sky One (relaunch)
78	—N/a	359	—N/a	That's 80s	That's TV Network Ltd	2026-03-02	Ceased broadcasting.
75	—N/a	360	—N/a	That's Oldies	That's TV Network Ltd	2026-03-02	Ceased broadcasting.
76	—N/a	361	—N/a	That's Melody	That's TV Network Ltd	2026-03-02	Ceased broadcasting.
—N/a	—N/a	909	—N/a	Climax	Aylo Global Entertainment (Europe) Limited	2026-04-01	Ceased broadcasting before being surrendered by Ofcom.
—N/a	—N/a	312	405	Sky Cinema Animation HD	Sky Group	2026-04-30	Ceased broadcasting.
—N/a	—N/a	181	—N/a	That's TV 2	That's TV Network Ltd	2026-05-26	Removed from Sky; continue to broadcast on Freeview.
—N/a	—N/a	183	—N/a	That's 20th Century	That's TV Network Ltd	2026-05-26	Removed from Sky; continue to broadcast on Freeview.
—N/a	—N/a	603	—N/a	Boomerang HD	Turner Broadcasting System Europe (Warner Bros. Discovery).	2026-05-26
—N/a	—N/a	176	—N/a	Court TV	Sony Pictures Television (on behalf of Katz Broadcasting, LLC (E. W. Scripps Company)).	2026-07-07

== See also ==
- Television in the United Kingdom
