= Pop Girl =

British children's television channel

Programming
- Picture format: 16:9/4:3, 576i (SDTV)
- Timeshift service: Pop Girl +1 (2008–2013)

Ownership
- Owner: Sony Pictures Television
- Sister channels: Bliss; Chart Show Dance; Chart Show TV; Flava; Kix; More Than Movies; Movies4Men; Pop; Scuzz; Sony Entertainment Television; Sony Movie Channel; Starz TV; Tiny Pop; True Drama; True Entertainment; True Movies 1 True Movies 2 The Vault

History
- Launched: 6 August 2007
- Closed: 1 October 2015

Pop Girl was a British free-to-air children's television channel owned by CSC Media Group (formerly Chart Show Channels), a company associated with the music video programme The Chart Show, which had previously aired on Channel 4 and ITV. Programming that aired on the channel included cartoons, live action shows and music videos, and was available on Sky and Freesat. Its target audience was 7 to 12-year-old girls.

Pop Girl originally broadcast from 6 am until 9 pm in order to timeshare with AnimeCentral, a short-lived general entertainment channel also owned and operated by CSC Media Group, which broadcast from 9 pm until 6 am. Subsequently, Pop Girl's broadcast hours were extended to match with Kix! and it aired from 6 am until 11:30 pm. This allowed the sharing arrangement with AnimeCentral to end, allowing AnimeCentral to broadcast 24 hours before it became Showcase TV (now True Entertainment).

== Little Miss Pop Girl ==
On 12 May 2008, a block called "Little Miss Pop Girl" was introduced, which resulted in a slight change to the channel's content between 9 am and 12 pm every weekday during the school term. The block was aimed at younger girls and featured cartoons such as Lazy Lucy, Pippi Longstocking, Strawberry Shortcake and Horseland, including some programmes which were more commonly seen on Tiny Pop. The logo for the block was the regular Pop Girl logo with the words "Little Miss" subtitled. The block did not air on weekends or during school holidays.

== Pop Girl +1 ==
On 9 May 2008, the AGB Nielsen Media website announced that Pop Girl +1 would launch on Sky channel 629, on 9 June 2008. However, it was instead launched on 4 June 2008, replacing CSC Media Group's first music timeshift channel, Flaunt +1, which had launched four weeks earlier.

On 22 July 2013, Kix received a spin-off channel, Kix Power, which replaced Pop Girl +1.

== Closure ==
Pop Girl closed at 6am on 1 October 2015. Its channel slot was replaced with transmission of a revived Kix +1 timeshift channel. Shortly after the transition, the positions of the channel on the Sky and Freesat guides were altered in order to move the channel below Kix in the lineup, which had been in front of Kix on both platforms.

Several programmes broadcast on Pop Girl moved to other channels, such as H2O: Just Add Water, which moved to Pop.

Despite Pop Girl's closure, the popgirl.tv website continued to operate for several months and continued offering programming, video clips, quizzes and games; a message on the site stated that the website would later receive a relaunch as part of its transition to an online service. In addition, a Pop Girl section of games, features and videos was made available on sister channel Pop's website. It was later redirected to the Pop website.

== See also ==
- CSC Media Group
- Kix
- Pop
- Tiny Pop
