= Showcase TV =

British television channel

- Country: United Kingdom

Programming
- Picture format: 4:3, 576i (SDTV)

Ownership
- Owner: Information TV

History
- Launched: 27 August 2008; 18 years ago
- Replaced: AnimeCentral
- Closed: 3 August 2009; 17 years ago
- Replaced by: True Entertainment

Showcase TV was a television channel in the United Kingdom currently run by Information TV and is used to offer smaller specialist channels a place to showcase their programmes, sometimes leading to a full channel launch. It is also used as a placeholder channel and has been used to hold on to lucrative EPG slots from defunct channels which are then sold on at a later date. It has ceased and restarted many times over the years. Currently as of 2024, the latest incarnation of Showcase TV, which had been renamed Ayozat TV in 2021, was shut down on Sky on 14 October 2024, though it still broadcasts online and plans to launch on "Freeview Digital" with no further details currently available.

Not to be confused with a similarly named channel which ceased on 20 August 2007 Life Showcase TV or Showcase TV run by Classic Media Group in March 2017 which was just a programme slot on Sky channel 181, until moving in 2020 to channel 191.

== Showcase TV 2008 lineup ==
The 2008 incarnation of Showcase TV started at 06:00 on 27 August 2008. It did not receive an official launch but instead, went from AnimeCentral to Pop Girl program block straight away. It showed a mixture of different content from other CSC Media Group channels such as Pop Girl, Chart Show TV, True Movies 2 and had retained some AnimeCentral programming, in its own block between 04:00 and 06:00 with repeats of Cowboy Bebop and Ghost in the Shell: Stand Alone Complex. Its licence first appeared on the Ofcom website in January 2007 (initially named Toon TV, this was changed to AnimeCentral in June 2007, to True Entertainment in June 2008 and to Showcase TV on August 26, 2008).

The original launch lineup for Showcase TV was a Pop Girl simulcast from 6am to 4pm, a Chart Show TV simulcast from 4pm to 8pm, a True Movies 2 simulcast from 8pm to 12am (two movies) and an AnimeCentral block from 12am to 3am, with the airtime from 3am to 6am sold for teleshopping.

This later changed; the teleshopping block was dropped, and the anime block was shortened and moved to 4am, such that the True Movies 2 section could extend to carry four movies between 8pm and 4am. At this point the simulcast of Pop Girl was replaced with a simulcast of Kix!. This new lineup then remained in place until the True Entertainment relaunch.

Start	End	Channel name
06:00	16:00	Kix!
16:00	20:00	Chart Show TV
20:00	04:00	True Movies 2
04:00	06:00	AnimeCentral

== 2009 Re-branded as True Entertainment ==
Showcase TV was replaced with True Entertainment. The rebranding was scheduled for 1 July 2009, but was later put "on hold until further notice." The change eventually took place a month later, on 3 August 2009. From that date, simulcasting of content from other CSC channels ceased, and True Entertainment launched its own schedule.

== Showcase TV reappears under new ownership ==
Information TV then relaunched the channel by renaming the Quest service from Discovery Communications Europe Limited in October 2009. By 2010 it had expanded with a sister channel "Showcase 2."

== Timeline of Freesat, Freeview, and Sky EPG Changes ==
Because of its nature as a placeholder channel it has come and gone many times from various TV platforms. The following is a partial history of the changes constructed from a change log on the Digital Spy discussion forum.

Timeline of EPG Changes
Date	Change made
2010-07-05	Moved to 403 on Freesat
2012-09-19	Moved from 403 to 400 on Freesat
2013-03-19	Showcase 2 launches on Freesat 402
2014-05-01	Showcase becomes Irish TV
2015-08-29	Appears on Freeview on channel 254 as IPTV stream
2016-01-21	Removed from Freesat
2016-01-21	Removed from 402 on Freesat (to become "Keep It Country" the following week).
2016-01-29	Showcase +1 launched on Sky 279
2016-03-21	Showcase moved to Sky channel 212
2016-06-20	Showcase returns to Freesat on channel 161
2018-08-02	Moved to Channel 455 on Sky
2018-08-10	Removed from Freesat again
2019-01-07	Moved to Sky 192
2019-02-04	Returned to Freesat 161
2020-01-31	Removed from Freesat again
2020-11-23	Moved to Sky 191
2021-10-28	Renamed Ayozat TV
2024-10-14	Ayozat TV shuts down on Sky

== Showcase TV (Classic Media Group) ==
Classic Media Group, based at Shepperton Film Studios, launched their Showcase TV channel as a placeholder on Sky channel 181 in March 2017. As of April 2021, Showcase TV had moved to Sky channel 191 and was showing the following programmes:

- Meet the Producers (with episodes devoted to the work of record producers like Chris Kimsey)
- Youth of Today: Stars of Tomorrow (new bands and singers)
- Live from the Edge (a 13-part music series presented by Mark Radcliffe from Edge Recording Studio, with performances by bands like The Sherlocks, Sea Fever and The Lottery Winners)
- All About The Music TV (a MTV-style video show created by impresario Rocco Buonvino, broadcast each Sunday afternoon)
- Fabsong (music videos from new artists)
