= True Drama =

- Country: United Kingdom
- Broadcast area: United Kingdom; Ireland

Programming
- Picture format: 4:3 576i (SDTV)

Ownership
- Owner: Sony Pictures Television
- Sister channels: True Movies; True Entertainment

History
- Launched: 4 June 2013
- Replaced: True Entertainment +1
- Closed: 30 September 2016
- Replaced by: True Entertainment +1

True Drama was a television channel in the United Kingdom and Ireland, broadcasting drama programming as part of the CSC Media Group's True brand of channels. True Drama was originally scheduled to launch on 24 April 2013, but the launch was delayed until 4 June 2013, when it replaced True Entertainment +1 on Sky channel 237. It moved to channel 183 there on 17 June 2013, swapping places with AIT International. It launched on Freesat on 21 July 2014 along with Tiny Pop +1, replacing Flava and Bliss on the platform.

The channel was mainly focused on classic American drama series and made-for-television films. It closed on 30 September 2016 and was replaced by True Entertainment +1.
