= Go:Audio =

- Origin: London, England
- Genres: Pop rock
- Years active: 2006–2009; 2020–present
- Labels: Rubix Records
- Past members: Zack Wilkinson; James Matthews; Josh Wilkinson; Nick Tsang; Andy Booth
- Website: myspace.com/goaudioband

Go:Audio are an English pop rock band from London, England. The band's sound implemented influences from pop punk and electropop, often using synthesizers and programming tools. They were also noted for not using a bassist and also supporting such bands as McFly, Scouting for Girls, hellogoodbye, Zebrahead and Bowling for Soup.

In 2008, they were nominated for "Best British Newcomer" at the Kerrang! Awards, which was won by Slaves to Gravity.

They released their debut extended play, Woodchuck, in March 2008 and along with the success of singles "Woodchuck" and "Made Up Stories", which made the UK Top 40, and She Left Me. They released their third single, "Drive to the City", on 20 April 2009. They released their first full-length album on 11 May 2009, titled Made Up Stories. On 26 November 2009, they announced on their MySpace blog that the band had split.

== History ==
Formed in 2006, Go:Audio was signed to Epic Records in May 2007. Their promotional single, Woodchuck, was released to many radio and music television stations in late January the following year to promote the 4-track Woodchuck EP. It received heavy rotation, most notably from Kerrang! 105.2 which helped make the accompanying music video one of the most played on YouTube in the United Kingdom that month. The band's first official single, "Made Up Stories" was released on 26 May 2008 and the video, in which a hand-picked group of fans participated, was frequently shown on Kerrang!, Scuzz and Fizz TV (now known as Starz TV). Following the single's release, the band announced via their MySpace page that their debut album would carry the same title. Recording for the album took place in Sussex, England, and was completed by early June 2008 for a 25 August release. The album was leaked in late June 2008, and a decision was made to delay the release date until 19 January 2009. The second single from Made Up Stories was "She Left Me", released on 11 August, the first day of their UK headline tour. The band debuted an acoustic version of the track on 6 August on Rocklouder.co.uk. "She Left Me" peaked at No. 41 in the UK Singles Chart.

In 2007, Popjustice listed them in 'The Popjustice 10 Acts for 2007' at No. 4, with Mika at No. 5, and described Go:Audio as "Busted meets The Killers". Also on 16 April 2008, Popjustice named their single "Made Up Stories" as 'Song of the Day'.

In September 2008 the band left Epic Records citing no longer feeling they could move forward with them. On 10 January 2009, Go:Audio issued a blog entry via Myspace stating that they had postponed the release of their album to re-record certain songs that they were not entirely happy with, and to record a new single "Drive to the City" which would be included on the album. This third single was released on 20 April 2009, and was well-received, reaching number one on the MTV2 Music Chart. Go:Audio posted a blog on their Myspace asking fans to choose b-sides for this single, giving them four songs to choose from (high demand caused all four tracks to be chosen eventually). The album, featuring a revised track-list to the leaked version, was released on 11 May 2009 following a Release-Show at the Camden Barfly, and debuted at No. 95 in the UK Albums Chart.

On their eight-date tour in April 2009 they had Saving Aimee and Eighth Wave as their support acts. On this tour, they began to play older tracks that had not been heard live for a few tours, alongside new tracks which had yet to have been heard by fans.

They also announced they started on their own record label 'Rubix Records'.

Josh Wilkinson remixed "We're The Good Guys" for the now-defunct band Saving Aimee as a b-side for the single which peaked at No. 125 in the UK Chart.

On 2 September, Zack Wilkinson announced that he would be leaving the band to pursue a career working at a record label. He posted this message on the band's Myspace blog: "As ever being a business head I am going to cut to the chase here...basically I have decided to leave go:audio and head into the music business working at a record label. It was one of the hardest decisions I have ever had to make but after speaking it through with the rest of the band it is the best decision. I have had the best time in Go:Audio and some unforgettable moments that will be with me forever!" His last show was on 12 September at Butserfest and he was replaced by Nick Tsang.

Go:Audio appeared at music festivals such as T in The Park, Oxegen, among others, and the band headlined their own tour in October, beginning on 30 September in Belfast and ending in London's Shepherd's Bush Empire on 17 October, with support from Twenty Twenty and Attack! Attack!. The band also headlined the Tuborg Stage at Download Festival in 2009.

On 26 November 2009, Matthews announced via the band's MySpace that the band was "calling it a day". They said "We are all really gutted about this decision but honestly feel it is the right one for us".

All members of the band went on to work in the music industry in a range of professions, including music management, songwriting, producing, lecturing, and session musicians.

In 2020 the band re-emerged on social media stating they had "unfinished business". This was followed by a number of previously unreleased tracks that the band did not get a chance to put out the first time around, including a number of tracks written and recorded when they were called The Vacancy (pre-Go:Audio). The band has stated that brand new material is to come in 2021 once the global pandemic restrictions allow.

== Previous members ==
- James Matthews – lead vocals (2006–present)
- Zack Wilkinson – guitars (2006 – Sep 2009)
- Joshua Wilkinson – synthesiser, programming, backing vocals (2006–present)
- Nick Tsang – guitars (Sep 2009 – Nov 2009)
- Andy Booth – drums, percussion (2006–present)

== Discography ==
=== Albums ===
Made Up Stories (2009)

=== EPs ===
Woodchuck EP (2008)

=== Singles ===
Year	Title	Chart Positions			Album/EP
Year	Title	UK Singles Chart	UK Rock Chart	UK Indie Chart	Album/EP
2008	"Woodchuck"	–	–	–	Woodchuck EP
2008	"Made Up Stories"	33	–	–	Made Up Stories
2008	"She Left Me"	41	–	–	Made Up Stories
2009	"Drive to the City"	90	–	–	Made Up Stories
