= Made Up Stories =

Made Up Stories may refer to:

- Made Up Stories (album), by Go:Audio, 2009
  - "Made Up Stories" (song), the 2008 title song
- Made Up Stories (company), an American/Australian film and television production company
