= The Chart Show =

British TV music video programme

- Created by: Keith MacMillan; Philip Davey
- Country of origin: United Kingdom
- Original language: English

Production
- Executive producers: Keith MacMillan; Gail Screene

Original release
- Network: Channel 4 (1986–1989, 2003); ITV (1989–1998); Chart Show TV (2008–2009)
- Release: 11 April 1986 – May 2009

The Chart Show (also known as The ITV Chart Show between 1989 and 1998) is a weekly syndicated music video programme, which ran in the United Kingdom from April 1986 until August 1998, with revivals in 2003 and 2008–2009.

The Chart Show originally ran in the United Kingdom on Channel 4 from 11 April 1986 up to 2 January 1989 in a 45-minute-long Friday evening slot (with some episodes in late 1988 airing on Monday evenings due to late schedule changes on the channel).

By the beginning of 1989, the popularity of the show persuaded the show's production team to move it from Channel 4 onto the ITV network. In its ITV transmission run between 7 January 1989 and 22 August 1998, The Chart Show was normally broadcast in the 11:30 am timeslot on ITV on Saturday mornings, with an early morning repeat later in the week in most regions; ITV episodes were generally one hour in length.

From 29 August 1998 onwards, The Chart Show was dropped and replaced by CD:UK, which ran until 2006. The Chart Show name returned to UK television as a short-lived revival by Channel 4 from 6 to 12 January 2003, and a second revival aired from 6 August 2008 to May 2009 on Chart Show TV.

The original production company was Video Visuals, and (when shown on ITV) was credited as "A Yorkshire Television Presentation" from 1993 and 1998 (prior to this, no ITV franchisee's logo was shown at the end).

== History ==
The show was designed to compete with established pop shows such as the BBC's Top of the Pops and was influenced by the video formats of MTV. The show was unique in that it had no presenters, instead computer-generated displays took their place in between promotional videos of artists.

The "pop-up" information snippets were represented as "windows" in a mock-up graphical user interface called HUD. In 1987 this was replaced with the more familiar display which featured a "mouse-pointer" and "icons" generated on an Amiga computer. Although commonplace nowadays, such interfaces were relatively cutting-edge at the time. The look of the icons was updated on the move to ITV on 7 January 1989, and again upon the show's relaunch on 7 December 1991 as part of a competition prize from Amiga Computing magazine. However, this update only lasted one show and the previous 1989 icons returned the following week and lasted until 11 May 1996 when the show's look and production was completely overhauled and was replaced with an animated text banner at the bottom of the screen.

Graphics mimicking those of a video recorder in operation were also used.

The show was very important when it was first launched, being one of the few outlets for music videos on British television, in the days before the widespread takeup of satellite and cable television, and channels such as MTV Europe. Some music videos got their UK Television premieres during The Chart Show.

Shortly after launching, The Chart Show found itself being taken off air during a dispute with the Musicians' Union over the showing of music videos on ITV & Channel 4 which lasted throughout the summer of 1986. During this time, a show called Rewind, made by the same production team, was aired. This consisted of performances from other music shows. The dispute was resolved by the end of the summer, and The Chart Show returned in August.

On Channel 4, the show ran on Friday nights, mainly filling gaps between series of The Tube. After moving to ITV it ran on Saturday mornings and also had a late night repeat in some ITV regions, though the day and time of this varied over time and between regions. One such late night repeat on 31 August 1997 was interrupted to report the breaking news of Diana, Princess of Wales' car accident. The show was so popular that it became a regular with five editions in July 1987 going out as 60-minute long "Summer Specials". The last regular edition to air on Channel 4 was on 30 September 1988. The final episode on Channel 4 was a Review of 1988 special on 2 January 1989; the first edition on ITV aired 5 days later. The show was renamed "The ITV Chart Show" that September after ITV launched its new corporate identity. The name reverted back to The Chart Show on 22 October 1994.

Earlier Channel 4 editions were 45 minutes long, and later ones were 60 minutes, but were split into two 30-minute segments before moving to the 60-minute format in 1988. However, some later editions were shortened due to ITV buying rights to Formula One motor racing in 1997.

The last edition was shown on 22 August 1998, after being axed in favour of a live, performance-based show, CD:UK, which began the following week. The show featured various messages from viewers saying goodbye to the show and how upset they were that the show was finishing. There were also messages from artists, including Mel B and Suggs.

The first video on The Chart Show was "What You Need" by INXS. The Chart Show mistakenly mentioned on the final show that Robert Palmer's Addicted to Love was the first artist to appear on The Chart Show. The video clip of Robert Palmer with the original graphics on, shown on the last episode, was taken from the 4th episode, rather than the first, as revealed by the date shown in the H.U.D.

In the show's later days, the programme was broadcast "live", with all the elements of the show programmed into a computer and laid back to tape, the song title graphics and info banners being added live as the show was broadcast. This fact was played up over the first few months of the show being made this way, with a "Live" graphic appearing at the beginning of each part, in addition to the interactive Battle of the Bands segment. Both of these were dropped after a minor revamp in 1997, although live phone-in competitions continued to appear occasionally until the end of the show's run.

=== A Different Chart ===
Confusion often arose from the chart used on the show, as they initially used the chart compiled by MRIB (which was used at the time by commercial radio, and was adopted by NME in 1988) and later on compiled their own chart, as opposed to using the "official" Gallup/CIN chart used by BBC Radio 1, which in addition to the show's initial Friday and later Saturday airdate (therefore not taking account of the full week's sales) meant that the chart shown was different from that broadcast by Radio 1. Indeed, there were many occasions when the single shown to be Number One by The Chart Show differed from the official number one – including on the show's first top 10 countdown in May 1987.

=== No Videos ===
Many singles featured in the charts had no music videos produced for them. Most of these songs were in the specialist charts, though they occasionally appeared in the Top Ten.

In the early years, the problem was solved by showing a photo of the artist over a short excerpt from the song. As the show progressed, they had produced many various computer-generated sequences to accompany the audio clips. Due to the lack of an actual music video, the songs in question were never played in full.

There were exceptions to this; the first being Ride on Time by Black Box. The music video was not completed for several months after the song was released. In its first week at number one on the Top Ten, a photo of Catherine Quinol, believed at the time to be the band's vocalist, was shown over a short excerpt from the single. However, as it was still number one the following week, a performance that was filmed for then Saturday morning show Ghost Train was shown, which had Catherine Quinol and an unknown organist performing on a stage.

Another exception was Always by Bon Jovi. The music video wasn't shown two weeks after being first played. In its first week at number one on the Rock Chart which aired on 17 September 1994, slowed-down clips of Keep the Faith were shown.

Another notable example was Music Sounds Better with You by Stardust. This was number one on 15 August 1998 edition of the show and, similarly to Ride on Time, the music video wasn't completed until several months later. This time, a montage of past graphics from the show was put together, partially in response to viewer requests to see old graphics before the final episode.

In 1997, The Verve had refused to allow The Chart Show to show the video for their single Lucky Man. When the song was mentioned in the top ten and in the indie chart, a message was shown on the screen explaining that they refused to let the video appear on the show, unless the show was redesigned.

Sometimes, when an artist did not have a video for their single, footage of a previous video would be used, and sometimes slowed down or distorted to accompany the track that had no video or a live performance of the single. One notable example was Pearl Jam: From 1993 to 1997, Pearl Jam refused to make promo videos for their singles, and so The Chart Show often used footage from the band's "Even Flow" video to accompany a few seconds of their singles from that time, whenever they appeared on the Rock Chart.

=== Sponsorships ===
The show had three sponsors over the span of its life. These were Pepe Jeans (1991–1992), Twix (1993–1996) and Tizer (1997). Tizer also sponsored The Chart Show's replacement, CD:UK, for several years. Unlike most sponsorships on UK television, these were incorporated into the show's titles as opposed to being shown as separate clips wrapped around the show in questions.

When Tizer became the new sponsor, the stings caused criticism as they were played at random moments during the titles and end credits, interrupting the show deliberately. Due to the irritation this caused, they were eventually dropped so that the show would run clean.

As part of 'The Vault' repeats, the sponsorships are now either blurred or edited out of the title sequences/end credits to avoid controversy.

=== Vault Repeats ===
Satellite channel The Vault began repeating 1991–92 and 1996–97 episodes from December 2006 on Saturday mornings, similar to the shows original timeslot on ITV, though not in chronological order. The first episode to be broadcast was the 1992 special. The Vault also aired repeats of the repeats on the following Thursday. Due to the sponsors of the show being included in the show's titles, The Vault had to re-edit the episodes and blur out the sponsors' logos, as they are no longer affiliated with the show. The Video Visuals logo was also cut from the episodes despite Video Visuals being part of CSC Media Group, which owns and operates The Vault.

The repeats also aired without the channel's "V" graphic in the corner of the screen, but on-screen competition graphics were aired and proved unpopular with viewers – such competition graphics still air to this day across the CSC Media Group network. On several occasions, episodes were cut off abruptly to unplanned commercial breaks and blank screens, and some airings were accidentally ones that had already been shown on The Vault's run of the show. One scheduled episode failed to air completely and was replaced with another programme, which led to a double bill being shown the following weekend.

The Vault has yet to air pre–1990 editions of the show or editions from 1993 to 1995 as said episodes were (and still are to this day) stored on unplayable formats, and the network does not have compatible machines equipped to play the episodes. The shows were allowed to be converted, but the conversions were apparently very expensive, and the chances of The Vault converting the episodes depended on the popularity of the repeats. However viewing figures began to drop, which led to the showings being dropped in July 2007, and the incompatible editions of the show were ultimately not converted.

In March 2008, Classic Chart Show returned to The Vault by popular demand. Unlike the previous run, the repeats were not advertised; the news only broke on The Vault's website. However, only four episodes were broadcast – two reportedly from the last run of repeats and two new repeats that suffered technical problems, one of which consisted of the first part being repeated three times. The repeats were dropped the following month.

The repeats eventually returned for a third time on Friday 28 November 2008, though re-edited. Instead of blurring the sponsor's logo during the title sequence, scenes displaying the sponsor are entirely cut, and the show starts from when the logo disappears. On 17 January 2009, a scheduled episode of the show failed to air for unknown reasons, and a regular run of music videos took its place. In May 2010, the Vault have been showing repeats of Chart Show episodes from 1997 and 1998 on the channel each day, at 3 pm and 10 pm. The repeats were dropped in March 2011.

=== Format Revivals ===
==== Channel 4 ====
For two weeks in January 2003, The Chart Show returned to Channel 4 in 60-minute segments in the morning, although these followed a different format, with a voiceover and absent of the faux video recorder graphics that the show was well known for. A similarly formatted version also ran on Chart Show TV during its first few months on air.

==== Chart Show TV ====
On 6 August 2008, a revival of The Chart Show aired on Chart Show TV. This version is somewhat closer to the original format than that of the short-lived 2003 version.

The revival retains some of the original features of the show, including the faux video recorder graphics and the Video Vault, including the original 1996 ident. New features include an Airplay Chart, Urban Chart, Download Chart and Interactive Chart. An NME TV Video Chart features which consists of music video as voted by users of the NME TV website.

The traditional specialist charts, Dance, Rock and Indie, are expected to appear under new identities, as the second episode featured a Flaunt Dance Chart.

== End-of-year specials ==
Excluding 1994, the show would have an 'end-of-year' episode that featured 'best' and 'worst' awards as well as countdowns of the best-selling songs of the year.

Winners:

=== Best New Act ===
- 1986 - The Housemartins - Happy Hour
- 1987 - Wet Wet Wet - Sweet Little Mystery
- 1988 - The Pasadenas - Tribute (Right On)
- 1989 - The Beautiful South - You Keep It All In
- 1990 - Beats International - Dub be Good to Me
- 1991 - Kenny Thomas - Outstanding
- 1992 - Tasmin Archer - Sleeping Satellite
- 1993 - Jamiroquai - Too Young to Die
- 1995 - Supergrass - Alright
- 1996 - Spice Girls - Say You'll be There
- 1997 - The Seahorses - Blinded by the Sun (as voted by the public)

=== Best Solo Artist ===
- 1988 - Tracy Chapman - Fast Car
- 1989 - Lisa Stansfield - All Around the World
- 1990 - Harry Connick, Jr. - We are in Love
- 1991 - Seal - Crazy
- 1992 - Curtis Stigers - I Wonder Why
- 1993 - Björk - Big Time Sensuality
- 1995 - Alanis Morissette - Hand in My Pocket
- 1996 - Louise - Undivided Love
- 1997 - Sheryl Crow - Everyday is a Winding Road (as voted by the public)

=== Best Video of the Year ===
- 1986 - Peter Gabriel - Sledgehammer
- 1987 - New Order - True Faith
- 1988 - Siouxsie and the Banshees - Peek-a-Boo
- 1989 - Fine Young Cannibals - She Drives Me Crazy
- 1990 - Paula Abdul - Opposites Attract
- 1991 - Shakespears Sister - Goodbye Cruel World
- 1992 - R.E.M. - Man on the Moon
- 1993 - Peter Gabriel - Kiss That Frog
- 1995 - Gavin Friday - Angel
- 1996 - Jamiroquai - Virtual Insanity
- 1997 - Various Artists - Perfect Day (as voted by the public)

=== Best Foreign Video ===
- 1986 - Prince - Kiss
- 1987 - Crowded House - Don't Dream It's Over
- 1988 - Toni Childs - Don't Walk Away
- 1989 - Malcolm McLaren - Waltz Darling

=== Best Band ===
- 1997 - Texas - Say What You Want (as voted by the public)

=== Best Director ===
- 1993 - Terence Trent D'Arby - She Kissed Me
- 1995 - Tricky - Overcome

=== Worst Video of The Year ===
- 1986 - Frankie Goes to Hollywood - Rage Hard
- 1987 - Anita Dobson - Talking of Love
- 1988 - Shakin' Stevens - True Love
- 1989 - Edelweiss - I Can't Get No... Edelweiss
- 1990 - David Hasselhoff - Crazy for You
- 1991 - Barry Manilow - Jingle Bells
- 1992 - The Troggs - Wild Thing
- 1993 - Dusty Springfield & Cilla Black - Heart and Soul
- 1995 - Denise Welch - You Don't Have to Say You Love Me
- 1996 - Peter Ebdon - I am a Clown
- 1997 - Vanilla - No Way No Way

=== Funniest Video of the Year ===
- 1988 - "Weird Al" Yankovic - Fat
- 1989 - Bananarama with French and Saunders - Help
- 1990 - DJ Jazzy Jeff & the Fresh Prince - I Think I Can Beat Mike Tyson

=== Dance Chart ===
- 1986 - Cameo - Word Up
- 1987 - Rick Astley - Never Gonna Give You Up
- 1988 - Yazz and the Plastic Population - The Only Way is Up
- 1989 - A Guy Called Gerald - Voodoo Ray
- 1990 - Adamski - Killer
- 1991 - Bizarre Inc - Playing with Knives
- 1992 - SNAP! - Rhythm is a Dancer

=== Best Dance Video ===
- 1997 (Voted by the public)
  - 1. Puff Daddy & Faith Evans - I'll be Missing You
  - 2. Dario G - Sunchyme
  - 3. Jamiroquai - Alright

=== Indie Chart ===
- 1986 - The Smiths - Panic
- 1987 - M/A/R/R/S - Pump Up the Volume
- 1988 - Yazz and the Plastic Population - The Only Way is Up
- 1989 - Inspiral Carpets - Joe
- 1990 - Happy Mondays - Step On
- 1991 - Curve - Frozen E.P.
- 1992 - Suede - The Drowners

=== Best Indie Video ===
- 1993 - The Smashing Pumpkins - Today
- 1995 - Björk - It's Oh So Quiet
- 1996 - Rocket from the Crypt - On a Rope
- 1997 (Voted by the public)
  - 1. Super Furry Animals - Play It Cool
  - 2. Oasis - Stand by Me
  - 3. Suede - Saturday Night

=== Heavy Metal/Rock Chart ===
- 1986 - Bon Jovi - You Give Love a Bad Name
- 1987 - Heart - Alone
- 1988 - Iron Maiden - Can I Play with Madness
- 1989 - Metallica - One
- 1990 - Faith No More - Epic
- 1991 - Bryan Adams - (Everything I Do) I Do It for You
- 1992 - Ugly Kid Joe - Everything About You

=== Best Rock Video ===
- 1997 (Voted by the public)
  - 1. Skunk Anansie - Hedonism
  - 2. Reef - Place Your Hands
  - 3. Green Day - Hitchin' a Ride

=== Network Album Chart ===
- 1986 - Dire Straits - Brothers in Arms
- 1987 - U2 - Joshua Tree

=== Network Singles/The Top Ten/Top Twenty ===
- 1986 - Nick Berry - Every Loser Wins
- 1987 - Rick Astley - Never Gonna Give You Up
- 1988 - Womack & Womack - Teardrops
- 1989 - Black Box - Ride on Time
- 1990 - Adamski - Killer
- 1991 - Bryan Adams - (Everything I Do) I Do It for You
- 1992 - SNAP! - Rhythm is a Dancer
- 1993 - 2 Unlimited - No Limit
- 1995 - Céline Dion - Think Twice
- 1996 - Mark Morrison - Return of the Mack
- 1997 - Various Artists - Perfect Day

== See also ==
- Chart Show Channels
- Chart Show TV
- The Vault
- B4 (music show)
