= Chart Shop TV =

British television channel

- Country: United Kingdom

Programming
- Picture format: 4:3 SDTV

Ownership
- Owner: Chart Show Channels
- Sister channels: Chart Show TV

History
- Launched: 6 October 2002; 23 years ago
- Closed: 11 March 2003; 22 years ago
- Replaced by: Video Vault

Chart Shop TV was a short-lived British television channel owned and operated by CSC Media Group. Launched on 6 October 2002 following the launch of its sister channel Chart Show TV, the channel was listed in the Shopping section of the Sky Digital programme guide, and aired from 3:00 am to 6:00 am, during Chart Show TV's downtime.

The channel closed on 11 March 2003. and the following day, Chart Show Channels used the broadcast capacity to launch a second music service, The Vault.
