= BuzMuzik =

Programming
- Picture format: 16:9, 576i (SDTV)

Ownership
- Owner: CSC Media Group

History
- Launched: 30 May 2012
- Replaced: Chart Show TV +1
- Closed: 3 April 2014
- Replaced by: True Entertainment +1 (Sky); Starz TV (Freesat)

BuzMuzik was a viewer-controlled British music television channel owned and operated by CSC Media Group. The channel was the first of its kind, using social media and SMS to control the music playlists. It launched on 30 May 2012, the launch date having slipped back several times from an initially mooted February opening.

== History ==
The channel launched in the slot previously occupied by Chart Show TV +1, the first song being played was Take Care by Drake featuring Rihanna. Sky, this space was previously used by NME TV from November 2007 to January 2012 and MinX for six weeks prior to that. NME TV had also been broadcasting on Freesat since February 2011.

BuzMuzik played a range of current and contemporary hits, and included viewer-voted selection shows in a similar manner to the Most Requested shows on The Vault. The channel also promotes its use of social media sites such as Facebook and Twitter as a means of interacting with its audience.

== Closure ==
The BuzMuzik channel ceased broadcasts in early April 2014; despite good ratings the closure followed CSC's purchase in late 2013 of the Starz TV service on Sky 371, which had been operating as a standalone channel under the ownership of Cloud One Television Ltd. The final broadcast of the text-chat matrix on BuzMuzik was on Tuesday 1 April.

== Programming ==
The channel's programming was divided into different hours-long blocks like Weekend Warm-Up and Buz Hot One; unlike Starz TV which divided blocks into days-long ones.

BuzMuzik was available from 6.00 am - 3.00 am on Sky channel 372 and Freesat channel 505, and was part of a bouquet of music channels owned by CSC Media.

== On-air identity ==
The screen graphics featured, in the right hand side, a "runup" list of the latest tweets that either include @BuzMusik on social medias or messages from the text. Most of these were replied by BuzMusik itself. In the middle side, there was a small box featuring the latest video requests that used three-digit codes. In the left side, different photos on social medias sent by users were shown.
