= Take the Floor =

Take the Floor may refer to:

- Take the Floor (Scottish radio programme), airing on BBC Radio Scotland
- "Take The Floor", a song from Made Up Stories (album) by Go:Audio
