= CSC Media Group =

British cable television and broadcasting company

CSC Media Group Limited
- Trade name: CSC Media Group
- Formerly: Chart Show Channels (2002–2007)
- Type: Subsidiary
- Industry: Entertainment
- Founded: 20 May 2002; 24 years ago in England
- Defunct: 27 November 2019; 6 years ago
- Fate: Dormancy and liquidation; Music channels are owned by the Trace Group; Kids and family movies and general entertainment channels are owned by Narrative Capital
- Successor: Sony Pictures Television; Narrative Entertainment
- Headquarters: London, England
- Area served: United Kingdom and Ireland
- Key people: Remy Minute
- Number of employees: 51
- Parent: Sony Pictures Television (2014–2019)

CSC Media Group Limited, formerly known as Chart Show Channels (CSC), was a British cable television and broadcasting company that operated from 20 May 2002 until its dissolution by its final owner, Sony Pictures Television, on 27 November 2019.

== Background ==
CSC Media Group was named after the now defunct UK music show The Chart Show, which ran on ITV and Channel 4 for twelve years. CSC evolved from the original Chart Show production company Video Visuals, to Chart Show Channels, which was then acquired in 2007 by private equity group Veronis Suhler Stevenson.

Until its acquisition by Sony Pictures Television, the company owned 16 channels, all of which are advertising-funded and free to air (FTA).

== History ==
Chart Show Channels was founded on 20 May 2002. The company's first channel - Chart Show TV, launched on Sky on 16 September that year, with high viewing figures within its first week of launch. On 14 October a sister network, Chart Shop TV, was launched. This network allowed viewers to purchase CDs and music-related merchandise. It aired on the same broadcast capacity as Chart Show, and aired from 4:00–6:00 am early in the morning during Chart Show's downtime.

In March 2003, Chart Shop TV closed, and its broadcast capacity was used for Video Vault, once again broadcasting late-at-night during Chart Show TV's downtime. On 30 May the company's first children's network - Toons & Tunes soft-launched before fully launching as Pop in July. Video Vault would fully launch that month as The Vault, moving into Pop's broadcast capacity as a nighttime service. In September, a sister channel to Pop - Pop Plus, was launched, which functioned similarly to a timeshift service, although it didn't always air the same programmes as its sister channel. On 17 September The Vault moved out of Pop's capacity space and gained its own 24-hour slot.

In July 2004, the company's next music channel B4 was launched in Pop Plus' broadcast capacity, broadcasting in its space at night. Pop Plus later re-launched as the pre-school-oriented Tiny Pop at the end of the month.

In 2006, British Sky Broadcasting sold their three music channels Bliss (previously The Amp), Scuzz, and Flaunt to CSC. Formerly encrypted, CSC made the channels FTA like the rest of their channels.

In 2007, they launched five channels; two of which were timeshift channels: Pop +1 and Tiny Pop +1. The third channel was a new children's channel called Pop Girl, aimed at a young female audience. The fourth channel was AnimeCentral, which time-shares with Pop Girl, and shows animated series for an older audience; it was the first dedicated channel in the UK for anime broadcasting. The fifth was Minx, which was a spin-off music channel from the Minx slot shown on Chart Show TV. Minx was later replaced by NME TV, which is a dedicated indie music channel.

In 2008, they rebranded B4 to Flava after showing a mix of R&B music for a few months prior to this in March. The channel also went 16:9 widescreen prior to the rebrand, to match the other CSC music channels. On Tuesday 6 May, they launched Flaunt +1, a 1-hour timeshifted version of Flaunt. This was their first-ever timeshifted music channel, and is also the second to launch in the UK, after MTV One +1 (now MTV +1) launched in February 2008, replacing MTV Flux. On Monday 12 May, six days after launching their first music timeshift, Bliss +1, their second music channel timeshift, was launched and their third music channel timeshift, Scuzz +1 launched in November 2008. It soon closed, and the satellite transponder space was then used by NHK World TV. On Monday 19 May, they launched their fourth kids channel, replacing Pop +1. Kix! started at 06:00 hours, showing a mixture of cartoons, extreme sports, as well as music, aimed for boys, similar to another kids channel, Jetix. From its launch until the early 2010, it broadcast from 06:00 to 23:30 daily. Pop Girl +1, a 1-hour timeshifted version of Pop Girl launched on Wednesday 4 June, replacing their first music channel timeshift, Flaunt +1, which had only been on air just short of four weeks. AnimeCentral has been replaced with Showcase TV on 27 August 2008, which simulcasts a mixture of channels such as Pop Girl, Chart Show TV, True Movies 2, along with AnimeCentral programming block with repeats of Cowboy Bebop and Ghost in the Shell: Stand Alone Complex.

CSC was the majority owner of Moving Movies Ltd, with True Movies 1 being the first channel from the company, it launched on 8 April 2005 and was joined by True Movies 2 in March 2006. Both channels showed mainly made-for-TV movies from a range of genres, all based on real-life events and people.

They were announced as being one of the channel providers providing DVB-H channels in a 16 channel trial of the technology in Oxford, a system which would have carried Chart Show TV.

CSC was one of the parties involved in bidding for a low-bandwidth, 18-hour-a-day stream on the UK's digital terrestrial television (DTT) system in November 2005.

Like The Box Plus Network and All Around the World Productions channels, all of CSC's music channels now broadcast 24 hours a day.

In May 2012, CSC launched BuzMuzik, a new music television channel driven by mobile phone (text/mms) and social media.

In February 2013, CSC launched True Entertainment +1, a one-hour timeshift of True Entertainment. It was replaced by True Drama on 4 June 2013.

On 22 July 2013, Kix Power launched, replacing Pop Girl +1 on Sky. That was rebranded as Kix +1 on 1 October 2013, rebranded as Kix Power again on Christmas 2013 and Easter 2014; and was renamed Kix + on 22 April 2014. This timeshift was replaced with Pop +1 on 14 July 2014.

In late 2013, CSC purchased Starz TV, which was a sole channel by Cloud Television One Limited, following the collapse of Mushroom TV and the sale of Mushroom's all other channels to All Around the World Productions. In April 2014, CSC closed BuzMuzik, and replaced it with a revival of True Entertainment +1. The channel also closed for CSC to broadcast Starz TV.

On 26 June 2014, Sony Pictures Television, Sony's TV programming and network unit, said it would buy CSC and its 16 channels for £107 million ($180 million). The deal was completed on 15 August 2014. All the channels were transferred to Sony Pictures Television, and the company went dormant.

On 13 December 2018, their four remaining music channels were sold to the TRACE Group.

On 27 November 2019, the company was liquidated and dissolved.

As of 2025, Tiny Pop, Tiny Pop +1, Pop, and Pop +1 were the only CSC channels to still exist, as Pop Max closed on 22 April 2025.

On January 1, 2026, Narrative shut down both Pop and Tiny Pop's television channels, meaning all former CSC Media Group channels were closed. Both channels became a FAST-only television channel.

== List of channels owned by CSC Media Group ==
=== Defunct ===
Note: former channels in light red closed before the start of Sony's deal.

channel name	launch date	close date	notes
The Amp	2003/04/17	2006/03/02	replaced by Bliss
AnimeCentral	2007/09/13	2008/08/27	replaced by Showcase TV
Kix	2008/05/19	2017/08/30	Replaced by Pop Max
Pop Max	2017/08/30	2025/04/22	Sold and eventually shut down
Pop Max +1	2017/08/30	2025/04/22	Sold and eventually shut down
Pop	2003/05/29	2026/01/01	Sold and eventually shut down
Pop +1	2014/07/14	2026/01/01	Sold and eventually shut down
Tiny Pop	2004/07/27	2026/01/01	Sold and eventually shut down
Tiny Pop +1	2007	2026/01/01	Sold and eventually shut down
Bliss	2006/03/02	2015/11/27	
Bliss +1	2008/05/12	2008/06/02	allowed AnimeCentral to go 24 hours
BuzMuzik	2012/05/30	2014/04/03	replaced with True Entertainment +1; the channel also closed due to the CSC Media Group buying Starz TV which shows similar content to BuzMuzik
Chart Shop TV	2002/10/06	2003/03	replaced by The Vault
Chart Show TV +1	2012/01/05	2012/05/30	replaced by BuzMuzik
Flaunt	2003/04/17	2010/03/17	replaced by Dance Nation TV
Dance Nation TV	2010/03/17	2013/01/03	replaced by Chart Show Dance
Flaunt +1	2008/05/06	2008/06/04	replaced by Pop Girl +1
Flava	2004/07/12	2017/11/01	
MinX	2007/10/08	2007/11/22	replaced by NME TV
NME TV	2007/11/22	2012/01/05	replaced by Chart Show TV +1
Pop +1	2007/08/06	2008/05/18	replaced by Kix (returned on 2014/07/14)
Pop Girl	2007/08/06	2015/10/01	replaced by Kix +1
Pop Girl +1	2008/06/04	2013/07/22	replaced by Kix Power
Pop Plus	2003/09/08	2004/07/27	replaced by Tiny Pop
Scuzz	2003/04/17	2018/11/15	
Scuzz +1	2008/11/17	2008/11/21	Sky EPG slot sold to NHK World, an information channel owned by NHK
Showcase TV	2008/08/27	2009/08/03	replaced by True Entertainment
Starz TV	2005/01/24	2020/06/01	Sold to Trace Group, which eventually closed it on 1 June 2020
Trace Hits	2002/10/16	2023/04/27	Sold to Trace Group, which eventually closed it on 27 April 2023, which renamed it Trace Urban (it was originally Chart Show TV) on 1 November 2019 and eventually renamed Trace Hits on 5 January 2021 and closed on 27 April 2023
Trace Latina	2010/03/17	2020/06/01	Sold to Trace Group, originally called Chart Show Hits and eventually closed on 1 June 2020
Trace Vault	2003/03/12	2023/12/14	Sold to Trace Group on 1 November 2019, which eventually closed it on 14 December 2023, originally named The Vault
True Crime	2016/03/22	2018/02/06	replaced by Sony Crime Channel 2
True Crime +1	2016/03/22	2017/02/15	Sky EPG slot bought by TruTV
True Drama	2013/06/04	2016/09/30	replaced by True Entertainment +1
True Entertainment	2009/08/02	2019/09/10	replaced by Sony Channel
True Entertainment +1	2013/02/25	2013/06/04	replaced by True Drama (returned on 2014/04/03)
True Entertainment +1	2014/04/03	2015/08/17	EPG slot sold to AMC from BT (returned on 2016/09/30)
True Entertainment +1	2016/09/30	2019/09/10	replaced by Sony Channel +1
True Movies	2005/04/29	2019/09/10	replaced by Sony Movies Christmas
True Movies 2	2006/03/20	2016/09/30	replaced by True Christmas +1
