= Made Up Stories (song) =

Single by Go:Audio

from the album Made Up Stories
- Released: May 26, 2008 (UK)
- Recorded: 2007
- Length: 3:57
- Label: Epic
- Songwriter(s): Go:Audio

Go:Audio singles chronology
"Woodchuck" (2008)	"Made Up Stories" (2008)	"She Left Me" (2008)

Made Up Stories is the debut single from British band, Go:Audio, taken from the album of the same name. The single debuted at #85 on the UK Singles Chart. and reached #33 the following week.

During April 2008, the music video (featuring hand-picked fans of the band) was added to Kerrang!, Scuzz, The Hits and Fizz television stations. Hand-picked fans Included: Aaron Isaac-Hamm, Dani Salamone, Cheali Spencer, Nancy EL-Gamel, Naomi Edwards, Ben Gordon-Smith, Daisy Wootton, Simon Dugdale plus others. These fans were coined the M.U.S Crew after The band used a picture of them as their Myspace profile pic.

== Music video ==
The video shows the band playing outside at night, surrounded by fans. It shows James' girlfriend going into his house with another man and kissing him. Members of the band frequently appear next to the couple unnoticed, in reference to the line, "I was there but you didn't see me." Near the end, the two kiss in the bedroom, but the song stops, and the girl goes over to the cupboard, presumably hearing a noise. The song then starts again, as numerous fans come out of the cupboard and rush out of the room. The cheat also runs downstairs, embarrassed, but it is shown when he leaves the band playing outside the house the whole time, and he runs away when fans come out of the house. The girlfriend then comes to the door, only to see the band looking accusingly at her, and it ends with the lights dimming.

== Track listing ==
=== CD single ===
1. Made Up Stories
2. Woodchuck’s Revenge

=== CD single (acoustic version) ===
1. Made Up Stories (acoustic version)

=== 7" Vinyl Bundle 1 ===
1. Made Up Stories
2. You Don’t Have To

=== 7" Vinyl Bundle 2 ===
1. Made Up Stories
2. Made Up Stories (Impending Fall remix)
