= Trace Latina =

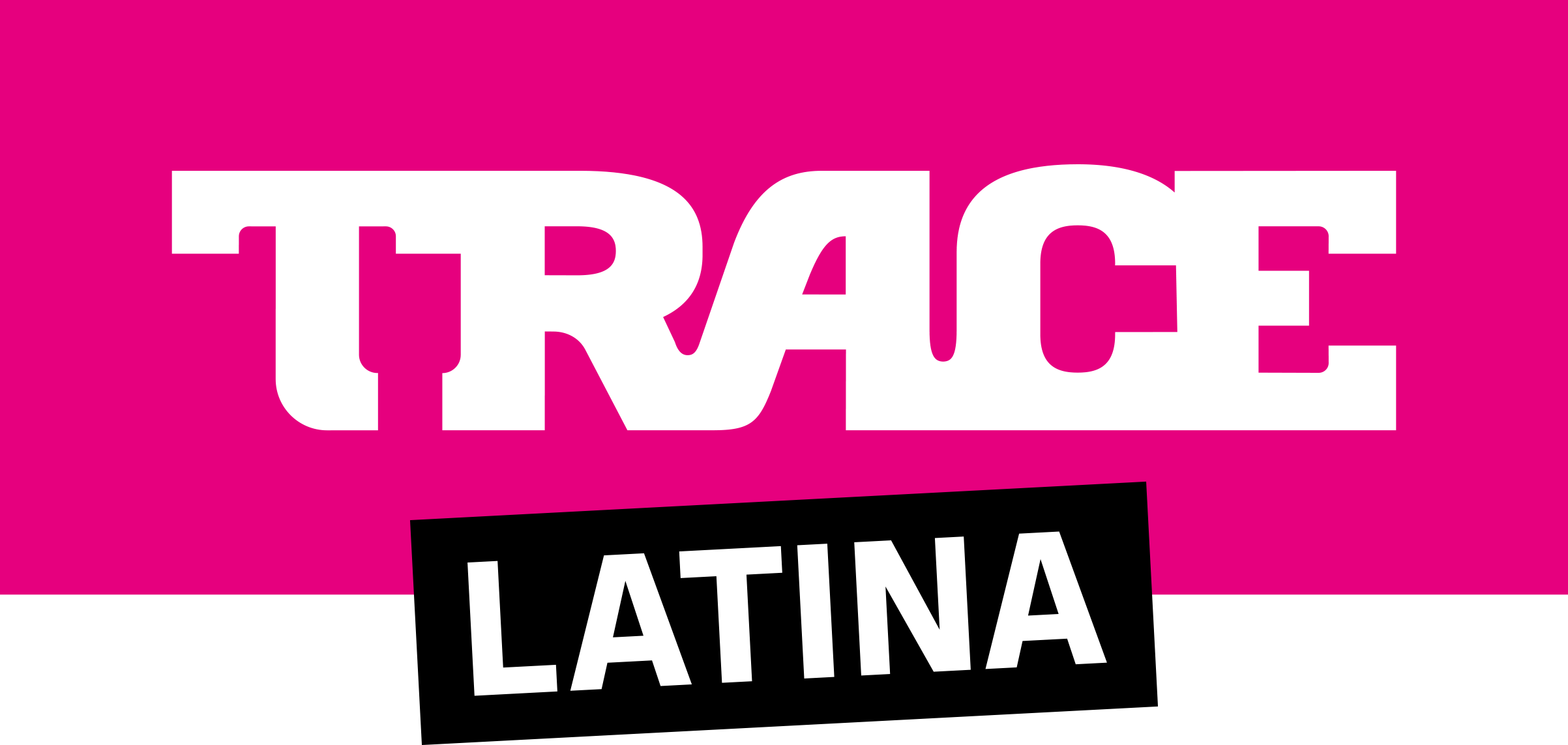

Programming
- Picture format: 16:9 576i SDTV

Ownership
- Owner: CSC Media Group (2010–2014); Sony Pictures Television (2014–2018); TRACE Group (2018–present)
- Sister channels: Starz TV; Trace Urban; Trace Vault

History
- Launched: 25 March 2010
- Replaced: Flaunt
- Closed: 1 June 2020
- Former names: Dance Nation (2010–2013); Chart Show Dance (2013–2016); Chart Show Hits (2016–2019)

Trace Latina was a British free-to-air music channel specialising mostly in urban Latin music. It broadcast in the United Kingdom on Sky. Despite its closure, it can still be accessed via the Channelbox streaming platform on Freeview UK channel 271.

== History ==
Chart Show Dance logo from January 2013 to June 2014.

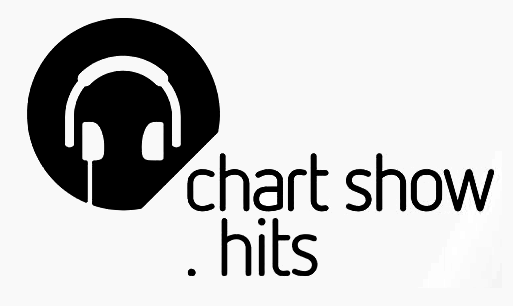
Chart Show Hits logo from September 2016 to May 2018.

On 17 March 2010, Dance Nation TV replaced Flaunt, specialising in dance music, chart remixes and mashups of popular songs. On 3 January 2013, Dance Nation TV was replaced with and rebranded as Chart Show Dance, after the last video shown in Dance Nation branding was Amelia Lily - Shut Up (Wideboys Remix).

Chart Show Dance was launched on Freesat on 15 July 2013, replacing Scuzz on the platform.

The first video shown following its rebrand as Chart Show Dance was 'Drinking From The Bottle' by Calvin Harris & Tinie Tempah.

From 20 November to 31 December 2014, Chart Show Dance was temporarily renamed to Dance Xmas for Christmas like Blissmas. It did the same from 1 to 31 December 2015, but this time as Dancember. On 1 July 2016, it rebranded again, but this time as Chart Show Summer.

On 22 September 2016, the channel was rebranded as Chart Show Hits. It, along with Chart Show TV, received a new logo on 1 May 2018. From 5 June until 4 September 2018, the channel was temporarily renamed as Summer Hits. From 1 November until 28 December 2018, it received a temporary rename to Christmas Hits, taking over from defunct sister channel Bliss. From 1 April until 7 June 2019, it was temporarily renamed again, this time as Global Hits.

On 1 November 2019, the channel was rebranded as Trace Latina following TRACE's takeover of Sony's music channels. Trace Latina launched in France and on internet in 2018. The last song to be played before the rebrand was "Atrévete" by Nicky Jam featuring Sech but was cut halfway through the song similarly to the sister channels' changes.

The channel ceased operations and stopped broadcasting on 1 June 2020, with its content moving to a block on Trace Urban from 11am to 3pm. The final music video played was "Vete Pa La" by Lele Pons, but the channel pulled the plug near the end of the video, similar to former sister channels Flava and Scuzz's closures.

The British free-to-air music channel, which was owned CSC Media Group and Sony Pictures Television before being sold to TPG Capital (with the owner being known as TRACE Group), returned to British TV screens in July 2022 on Freeview channel 271 as part of Channelbox's music channel line-up alongside Trace Urban and Trace Brazuca. Trace Latina also continues to exist in France, with its French version broadcast on Canal+ France, as well on the internet platform TracePlay.

== Programming (at time of original closure) ==
- Buenos Dias Hits - A selection of the best Latin hits in the morning.
- Viva Latina - A selection of the biggest and best Latin hits.
- Stream It - A selection of the biggest streams of the week.
- Reggaeton Vibes - A selection of the best reggaeton hits.
- All New, All Latina - A selection of the freshest Latin hits.
- Late Night Latina - A selection of the sexiest and fuego music videos for late night viewing.
- Latino Rewind - Throwback to some classic Latin hits.
- Hit 10 Official Trace Latin Chart - Countdown the top 10 Latin hits in the charts of the week.
- Hit 30 Official Trace Latin Chart - Countdown the top 30 Latin hits in the charts of the week.
- Top 10 Latin Pop - Countdown of the top 10 Latin pop hits of the week.
- Top 10: Reggaeton - Countdown of the top 10 reggaeton hits of the week.
- Brazil: Best 10 - Countdown of the top 10 hits in Brazil this week.
- Top 20: Duetos - Countdown of the 20 biggest collaborations this week.
- Focus

== Final programmes ==
- Hasta Manana - Viva Forever - We hope you have loved all the Latin Music we have been bringing you, make sure to tune in to Trace Urban from 11am tomorrow for all your hottest Latin hits.
- Latin Hits now on Trace Urban - Catch all your Latin hits on Trace Urban from 11am to 3pm - Sky Channel 364.
