= B4 (TV series) =

- Genre: Music
- Voices of: Caroline Feraday
- Country of origin: United Kingdom
- Original language: English
- No. of episodes: 180

Original release
- Network: Channel 4
- Release: 2004 – 2008

B4 is an early morning music video programme on Channel 4, formerly shown weekday mornings at 7:00am. It was normally broadcast as part of Channel 4's breakfast programming following children's programmes and preceding a number of comedy programmes from America. Produced by the firm behind ITV's The Chart Show, and spin off from their B4 music channel on cable and satellite, the show featured around 7 new upfront videos each day that were to be released in the United Kingdom in the near future, normally within the next month.It was hosted by broadcaster Caroline Feraday - who was out of vision and provided voiceover links.

== Trivia ==
- The first video shown on Channel 4 was Hilary Duff and Haylie Duff covering the Fun Boy Three/The Go-Go's song "Our Lips Are Sealed".
