= The Woodchuck EP =

EP by Go:Audio
- Released: March 3, 2008 (UK)
- Recorded: 2007 at Britannia Road Studios, London
- Genre: Indie pop, electronic rock
- Length: 13:34
- Label: Epic
- Producer: Go:Audio

Go:Audio chronology
The Woodchuck EP (2008)	Made Up Stories (2009)

The Woodchuck EP is the debut EP from British pop rock band Go:Audio. The title track Woodchuck was released to radio and music television stations in January 2008 to promote the EP release. It received heavy rotation on Kerrang! radio and also became one of the most watched videos on YouTube during that month.

Professional ratings
Review scores
Source	Rating
RockLouder	link
Beat Surrender	link

== Track listing ==
1. "Woodchuck" - 2:42
2. "Forget About It" - 3:41
3. "So Quiet You Were (Alternative Mix)" - 3:51
4. "Doesn't Really Matter (The Secret Handshake Remix)" - 3:20

All Tracks Written by: Go:Audio

== Personnel ==
- James Matthews - vocals
- Josh Wilkinson — keyboards, synthesizer
- Zack Wilkinson — guitars
- Andy Booth — drums, percussion
