= True Entertainment =

British television channel

Programming
- Picture format: 16:9 576i SDTV
- Timeshift service: True Entertainment +1

Ownership
- Owner: CSC Media Group (2009–2014); Sony Pictures Television (2014–2019)
- Parent: True Channels
- Sister channels: True Drama; True Movies

History
- Launched: 3 August 2009
- Replaced: Showcase TV
- Closed: 10 September 2019
- Replaced by: Sony Channel (UK) (now Great! TV)

Links
- Website: truemovies.com

True Entertainment was a British free-to-air television channel that was launched on 3 August 2009, replacing Showcase TV. The change was originally scheduled to happen on 1 July 2009, but this was later put "on hold until further notice". While the bulk of its programming were movies, similar to sister channels True Movies 1 and True Movies 2, the channel aimed to establish itself as a general entertainment channel.

Its licence first appeared on the Ofcom website in January 2007 (initially named "Toon TV", this was changed to "AnimeCentral" in June 2007, to "True Entertainment" in June 2008, and to "Showcase TV" on 26 August 2008. It then changed back to "True Entertainment" on 10 June 2009. Its logo is the same as the True Movies 1 and True Movies 2.

On 5 July 2010, True Entertainment was launched on Freesat. On 1 March 2011, True Entertainment launched on Virgin Media. True Entertainment was launched on Freeview channel 61, with the exception of transmitters in Wales, on 6 August 2013. It was accompanied by a refreshed schedule to take into account the new Freeview viewers. A temporary duplicate launched on channel 126 on Virgin Media at midnight on 22 July 2018, a slot previously vacated by Alibi prior to the UKTV channels' removals, until the network was restored on 11 August 2018.

True Entertainment +1, a one-hour timeshift channel, was launched on 25 February 2013. The channel was replaced by True Drama on 4 June 2013. The channel relaunched on 3 April 2014, replacing BuzMuzik, which closed due to CSC bringing Starz TV to their list. It closed again on 17 August 2015, with its slot being bought by the Information TV group for Showcase, which moved from channel 192, as its slot was bought by BT Group for their AMC from BT channel. On 30 September 2016, it returned, replacing True Drama. The channel was launched on Virgin Media on 21 July 2018.

The channel was closed and replaced by a relaunched Sony Channel on 10 September 2019.

== Former programming ==
- Born and Bred
- Bramwell
- Castle
- Chicago Hope
- Classic Who Wants to Be a Millionaire?
- Crazy Like a Fox
- Diagnosis Murder
- Down to Earth
- Due South
- Gunsmoke
- Hamish Macbeth
- Happy Days
- Hart to Hart
- Highway to Heaven
- Little House on the Prairie
- The Irish R.M
- In Plain Sight
- Ironside
- M*A*S*H
- Man About the House
- Murder, She Wrote
- Napoleon and Josephine
- The New Avengers
- Pearl
- The Persuaders!
- Providence
- The Prisoner
- Railway Murders
- Randall and Hopkirk (Deceased)
- Rising Damp
- Road to Avonlea
- Robin's Nest
- Roots
- Starsky and Hutch
- Taggart
- Tenko
- T.J. Hooker
- Touched by an Angel
- The Avengers
- The Vice
- The Waltons
- Unforgettable
