= Vanilla (group) =

British pop band

VANILLA
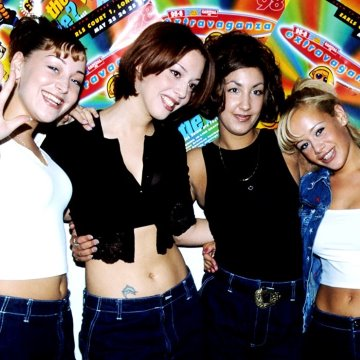
- Girl group VANILLA

Background information
- Origin: Barnet, London, England
- Genres: Pop
- Years active: 1996–1998
- Label: EMI
- Past members: Frances Potter; Alison Potter; Alida Swart; Sharon Selby

Vanilla were a British pop girl group from Barnet, London, England, formed in 1996.

== History ==
The band members were sisters Frances and Alison Potter, Alida Swart and Sharon Selby. They released two singles for EMI in the late 1990s.

The band's first single was "No Way, No Way", released in December 1997 and based on Piero Umiliani's "Mah Nà Mah Nà". The song peaked at number 14 on the UK Singles Chart and number 24 in New Zealand. The accompanying music video was filmed at Brockwell Lido in Brixton, South London. The clip won the title of "Worst Music Video Ever" on the 1997 ITV Chart Show end-of-year special and was voted number 26 on Channel 4's "100 Worst Pop Records". The follow-up was "True to Us", released in April 1998, which rose to number 36 in the UK. Although mocked on Channel 4's morning programme The Big Breakfast, the group regularly took part in the show's "Vanilla's Thrillers" feature, including making a return for Johnny Vaughan and Denise van Outen's final week hosting the show.

While promoting their two singles with EMI, Vanilla made media appearances, including a performance of "No Way, No Way" on Top of the Pops, and performing a spoof version of "True to Us" on Blue Peter. They also obtained a feature on Men & Motors. They embarked on a tour of schools around the UK and were a minor act on the 1998 Disney Channel UK tour. After their contract with EMI ended, Vanilla continued to perform. They made various appearances at London's PopShow Party events where they played a cover of Nancy Sinatra's "These Boots Are Made for Walkin'" as well as promotional single "Realise", with temporary member Ashley.

In 2011, Frances appeared on the identity parade segment in Episode No. 25.8 of Never Mind the Buzzcocks, hosted by James Blunt. In 2014, Swart was interviewed for an article in The Guardian about the pitfalls of having a hit novelty record.

In 2021, an EP titled Vanilla containing promotional single "Realise" and two other tracks was briefly released to digital music outlets.

== Discography ==
Single title	UK	NZ	SC
"No Way No Way"	14	24	12
"True to Us"	36		32
Vanilla EP			
