= The Amp =

Programming
- Picture format: PAL (576i, 16:9/Pillarbox)

Ownership
- Owner: British Sky Broadcasting

History
- Launched: 17 April 2003
- Closed: 2 March 2006
- Replaced by: Bliss

Links
- Website: www.theamp.tv (No Longer Active)

The Amp was a satellite and cable television channel, showing music videos, owned by British Sky Broadcasting, and operated on their behalf by Chart Show Channels. It was operated as part of a trio, with Scuzz and Flaunt as its sister stations.

== History ==
In March 2003, British Sky Broadcasting announced they would enter the music television market and launch three themed channels - The Amp, Flaunt, and Scuzz.

The Amp would launch with its sister networks on 17 April 2003. The Amp focused on 'Alternative' or 'Non Mainstream' music along with a selection of trip hop, down tempo, electronica, ambient videos, and programming from today and days gone by mostly consisting old British 'indie' bands. The channel originally launched as an interactive network.

In September 2004, due to poor viewing figures and ratings, Sky announced that Chart Show Channels would take over operating The Amp, Scuzz, and Flaunt beginning in January 2005, although they would retain full ownership in all three channels, alongside advertising control. Following the change in operation, the interactive elements were removed, and the channel was refreshed, with the nighttime schedule populated with specialist TV shows talking about the careers of famous 'Alternative' Rock bands.

The channel was replaced with Bliss in March 2006 because although the channel had a loyal fan base, it simply failed to reach out to a wide enough audience, and wasn't cost-effective.

Until 15 November 2018 the only original channel that still existed was Scuzz which was also owned by BSkyB, as Flaunt closed on 17 March 2010, while Bliss closed on 27 November 2015.
