= Pop Max =

British children's television channel

- Final logo used from 2017 to 2025
- Country: United Kingdom

Programming
- Language: English
- Picture format: 16:9 576i SDTV
- Timeshift service: Pop Max +1

Ownership
- Owner: CSC Media Group (2008–2014); Sony Pictures Television (2014–2021); Narrative Entertainment UK Limited (2021–2025)
- Sister channels: Pop; Tiny Pop

History
- Launched: 19 May 2008
- Replaced: Pop +1
- Closed: 7 February 2024 (Freesat); 10 December 2024 (Freeview); 22 April 2025 (Sky)
- Replaced by: Pop and Pop Player (website and programming)
- Former names: Kix! (2008–2014); Kix (2014–2017)

Pop Max (previously Kix! and then Kix) was a British free-to-air children's television channel owned by Narrative Entertainment UK Limited. Programming that aired on the channel included cartoons, sci-fi, action and adventure series and anime and was available on Sky and on Freeview. Its target audience was boys aged 6 to 15.

== History ==
The channel launched at 6am on 19 May 2008, as Kix!, replacing Pop's timeshift channel, Pop +1. Kix! was the fourth children's channel to be launched by CSC Media Group. Its three sister channels were Pop, which was launched on 29 May 2003, and aired animated programming (originally music videos) for a mixed audience; Tiny Pop, which was launched on 26 July 2004, and featured animated programmes for young children and preschoolers; and Pop Girl, which was launched on 6 August 2007, and closed on 1 October 2015, and featured programmes aimed at girls.

In August 2008, Kix! launched on Freesat. The exclamation mark in its name was removed in May 2013, although it remained in some branding such as Sky's programme guide until 2014.

Kix became available on Freeview in April 2016, alongside Pop and Tiny Pop. In August 2017, Kix rebranded as Pop Max without any changes in its schedule. A stream of the channel was added to Pop Player's Freeview Play app in early 2022. On 25 May 2022, Pop Max was replaced on Freeview with the Pop Player channel.

=== Closure ===
On 7 February 2024, Pop Max and other Narrative Entertainment channels were removed from Freesat a month before the temporary closure of the Tiny Pop linear channel. On 10 December 2024, Pop Max was removed from Freeview.

On 17 April 2025, Sky confirmed that Pop Max would be removed from Sky providers on 22 April 2025. The channel closed on that date, and its programming continued to air on the main Pop channel.

== Kix Power ==
In July 2013, Kix launched a Power Rangers-exclusive channel known as Kix Power, replacing Pop Girl's timeshift feed, Pop Girl +1, which varied between this channel and Kix's own timeshift channel for several years, depending on school holidays.
