= Caroline Feraday =

British radio presenter (born 1977)

- Born: 25 May 1977 (age 49); Kent, England
- Presenting career
- Stations: KCLU-FM; BBC Radio; LBC 97.3; Capital FM
- Network: BBC, Sky, Channel 5
- Time slot: Overnight + Early Breakfast; 2 am – 6 am Friday morning
- Style: Public Radio; Talk show News Talk; Music show Phone-in
- Country: United States; United Kingdom
- Website: www.carolineferaday.com

Caroline Feraday (born 25 May 1977) is an English-American television and radio broadcaster currently living and working in Los Angeles.

== Radio ==
In 1995 at the age of 18, Feraday joined London radio station Capital FM, after studying journalism and earlier stints at BBC Radio Kent and Invicta FM. She spent six years as the Capital's Flying Eye travel reporter, and presented the London Chart show, Early Breakfast and the Saturday evening Dance Show as well as co-presenting 95.8 Capital FM's Breakfast show with Neil Fox. In 2001 she moved to BBC Radio 5 Live to present the travel reports on the Breakfast and Nicky Campbell shows as well as presenting her own shows - The Juice and The Weekend News, staying for two years. She then joined London radio station LBC 97.3, presenting the Drivetime show and later the Friday and weekend evening programmes.

She now works at KCLU, an NPR affiliate in Southern California. In 2022, 2023 and 2024 Feraday won Southern California's Audio Journalist of the Year, from the Los Angeles Press Club. Since joining KCLU, she's also won 11 Golden Mike Awards, four Los Angeles Press Club National Arts & Entertainment Journalism Awards, four Regional Edward R Murrow Awards and 6 further Los Angeles Press Club Awards.

=== BBC London ===
Feraday presented "Overnight on BBC London 94.9 with Caroline Feraday" from July 2011 until moving to Los Angeles in 2013.

== Television ==
Feraday made her first appearance on television as a presenter on VH1 in 1998. Since then she has presented Sky Rocket on Saturday nights on Sky One, The FifPro Awards on Sky One, Celebrity World Cup Live for Sky One, as well as hosting for Sky Travel, and in Hollywood as well as reports on location and on the studio sofa for GMTV, Living TV, ITV's The Mint for ITV1 and ITV Play. ITV Play and the ITV News Channel Breakfast show. She has worked as a showbiz reporter on This Morning on ITV, and was the voice of Channel 4's morning show B4 (daily at 7.00am) and the voice of Comedy Central and Comedy Central Extra from 2009 to 2014.

She also co-presented comedy show Consequently for Carlton, and hosted Capital FM's Party in the Park event in front of 100,000 people in 1998, 1999, 2000, and was the support act for the Spice Girls at Wembley Stadium. She covered the 2012 Olympics decision live from Trafalgar Square for London TV. From 2007 until 2009, she presented and reported for BBC South East on Breakfast, anchoring the morning news bulletins and 1.30pm lunchtime news. She presented shows on Thomas Cook TV. She continued to occasionally present and report for BBC News at South East and BBC London News, as well as anchoring the live BBC Children In Need television coverage from location.

She regularly appeared on Five's The Wright Stuff as a panellist. She has also appeared as a Celebrity contestant on The Weakest Link. Feraday presented The Mint on ITV Play and ITV.

She appeared on Celebrity Total Wipeout on BBC 1 in 2011.

She anchored Sky News in 2009 and 2010 and appeared as a newspaper reviewer and entertainment news correspondent from Los Angeles regularly on Sunrise with Eamonn Holmes.

She appeared in 2011 on Channel 5's short-lived Vanessa Show as a regular panellist, as well as on MTV's Jersey Royals, and once, in 2010, on Heston's Celebrity Fairytale Feast (Channel 4).

Feraday co-presented Sleepout Live in 2012 with Richard Madeley and Sara Cox.

She played in televised TV poker tournaments for Sky and Challenge TV.

The character Amber Rose in Sony's game TV Superstars was based on Feraday and voiced by her.

She regularly appears as a US news commentator and reporter on Talk TV, GB News, Sky News, TRT News and BBC News.

== Personal life ==
Feraday grew up in Halling in Kent, and attended Rochester Grammar School for Girls. She later lived in Clapham, London. Feraday enjoys films, music and running, and participated in her first marathon – in London – in 2005. She plays the flute and ukulele. She has one daughter.
