= AnimeCentral =

British television channel, 2007–2008

Anime Central
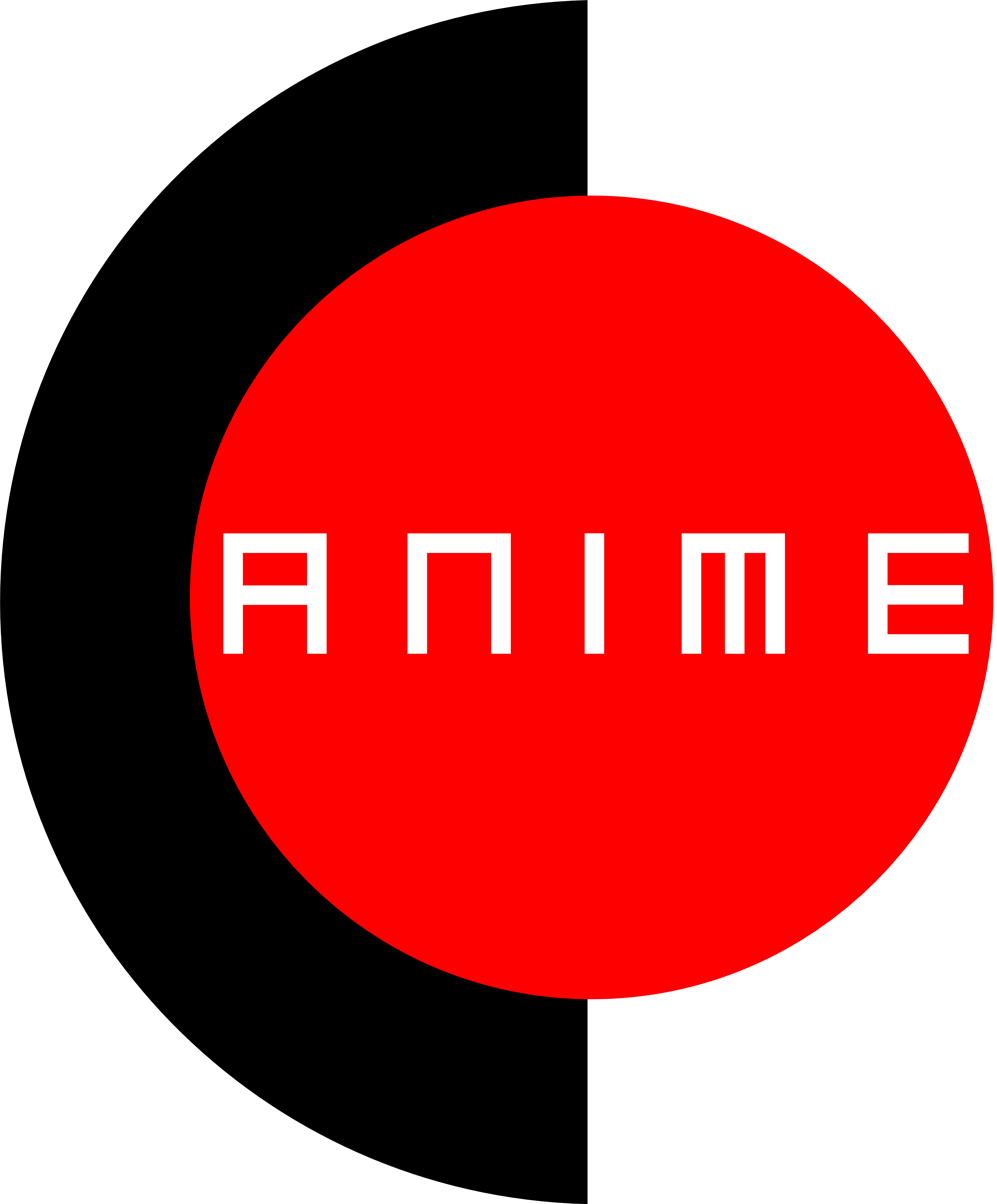
- Country: United Kingdom

Programming
- Picture format: 4:3, 576i (SDTV)

Ownership
- Owner: CSC Media Group

History
- Launched: 13 September 2007; 18 years ago
- Closed: 27 August 2008; 18 years ago
- Replaced by: Showcase TV

Links
- Website: animecentral.com

Anime Central was a short-lived British television channel owned by CSC Media Group. The channel launched on 13 September 2007 and was first announced on 5 August 2007, although its license had appeared earlier on the Ofcom website in January (originally under the name "Toon TV", which was changed to Anime Central in June). Broadcasting free-to-air on Sky's digital platform (channel 199), Anime Central operated daily from 9:00 pm to 6:00 am and was the only channel in the United Kingdom and Ireland dedicated solely to anime.

The channel initially timeshared with Pop Girl (another CSC Media Group service), but additional bandwidth later removed the need for timesharing. The extra capacity was filled with channel idents or teleshopping segments. Anime Central closed on 27 August 2008 and was replaced by Showcase TV. However, an Anime Central programming block continued on Showcase TV every night between 4:00 am and 6:00 am until August 2009, when it was dropped following the rebranding of Showcase TV as True Entertainment.

== Programming ==
Anime Central's schedule typically featured six series, each with a different episode broadcast daily. This formed a three-hour block that was repeated twice throughout the night until 6:00 am. Series were usually repeated once before any major schedule changes, unless they exceeded the standard 26-episode length. On 1 March 2008, the format shifted to three double-bills and later to two triple-bills, a change that was met with mostly negative reactions on the channel's forums.

Initially, the channel did not broadcast in anamorphic widescreen. Programmes produced in 16:9 were shown in letterboxed format. In 2008, some late-season episodes of Ghost in the Shell: S.A.C. 2nd GIG were screened in 16:9 anamorphic.

=== Christmas marathons ===
Between 21 December 2007 and 4 January 2008, the channel replaced its regular schedule with holiday marathons of three popular series:

- Cowboy Bebop (21–23 December 2007)
- Fullmetal Alchemist (24–29 December 2007)
- Bleach (30 December 2007 – 4 January 2008)

Each day featured up to nine consecutive episodes, forming a 4½-hour block repeated until 6:00 am.

== Subtitling ==
All series were initially broadcast dubbed into English, but debates on the channel's official forums centred on whether anime should also be offered in Japanese with English subtitles. In late 2007, the final nightly repeats of Cowboy Bebop and .hack//SIGN were broadcast in Japanese with English subtitles, partly in response to viewer demand.

== On-screen identity ==
On-screen graphics

Throughout its run, Anime Central used a consistent red-on-black visual theme across its advertising, bumpers, ident cards and website. At one point, the channel's brand manager sought feedback on possible changes to the presentation style via the forums, but no changes were ultimately made.

== Closure and replacement ==
In June 2008, an updated list of UK TV licenses from Ofcom no longer included Anime Central, fueling speculation on the forums that the channel was nearing closure. That same month, confirmation appeared on Ofcom's monthly updates page that Anime Central's license was being replaced by one for True Entertainment.

Despite suggestions that Anime Central content might be integrated into other CSC channels such as Pop Girl and True Movies 2, the channel officially closed in August 2008. Showcase TV subsequently carried a reduced Anime Central block (initially three hours, later cut to two), featuring double- and triple-bills of Cowboy Bebop and Ghost in the Shell: Stand Alone Complex. The block was dropped in August 2009 with the rebrand of Showcase TV to True Entertainment.

In 2014, Sony Pictures Television acquired CSC Media Group. In March 2015, Scuzz introduced Animax Movie Nights, a weekly block of anime films that aired until April 2015. The Anime Central website was later redirected to animaxtv.co.uk, though the UK Animax service itself closed in October 2018.

== Forum activity ==
Even after closure, the Anime Central forums remained online with low activity. New registrations were disabled in September 2008, fueling speculation about an impending shutdown.

In August 2009, the forums were closed completely, with visitors receiving the message: "Closed for cleanup and restructuring".
