= Drive to the City =

Single by Go:Audio

from the album Made Up Stories
- Released: April 20, 2009 (UK)
- Recorded: 2008
- Length: 3:11
- Label: Rubix Records
- Songwriter(s): Josh Wilkinson, Zack Wilkinson and James Matthews

Go:Audio singles chronology
"She Left Me" (2008)	"Drive to the City" (2009)

Special Edition cover

Drive to the City is a single from British band Go:Audio. It is the third single taken from their debut album Made Up Stories. The official music video was released by Go:Audio onto their official YouTube channel on 18 March 2009. The single was released on 20 April 2009. It failed to make the UK top 40, peaking at #90 on the chart.

== Track listing ==
=== CD single ===
1. Drive To The City
2. Why (Piano Version)

=== CD Single Special Edition ===
1. Drive To The City
2. Brake! Brake! (Live)
3. All Because Of You (Demo)

=== iTunes Version ===
1. Drive To The City
2. Drive To The City (Dance Mix)
