= Nicholas Breakspear School =

Nicholas Breakspear Catholic School

Location
- Colney Heath Lane; St Albans, Hertfordshire, AL4 0TT; England, United Kingdom; 51.74747°N 0.28881°W

Information
- Type: Academy
- Motto: Per Tuas Semitas (English: "In thy ways")
- Religious affiliation: Roman Catholic
- Established: 1963
- Founder: Father John Farnsborough
- Local authority: Hertfordshire County Council
- Area trustee: Diocese of Westminster Academy Trust
- Department for Education URN: 137938 Tables
- Ofsted: Reports
- Chair: Sue McLellen
- Head teacher: Andrew Dunne
- Staff: 124
- Gender: Coeducational
- Age: 11 to 18
- Enrolment: 574 (2016)
- Houses: Ten Houses
- Colours: Navy blue and yellow
- Slogan: Nurture Believe Succeed
- Publication: NBS School Magazine
- Website: nbs.herts.sch.uk

Nicholas Breakspear Catholic School (NBS) is a secondary school with academy status situated on the rural fringe of St Albans, an old Roman city in Hertfordshire, England.

The school takes its name from the 12th-century priest St Albans-born and educated Nicholas Breakspear, who, as Pope Adrian IV, is the only Englishman ever to have occupied the papal chair. The school makes an annual pilgrimage to his tomb in Rome. (The school goes to Rome each year, but has only once gone to the tomb)

== Recent history ==
After a 2008 renovation of the science classrooms, Chris Reeves made a nativity scene composed of sculptures made from the discarded 1960s desks.

In September 2013 the school celebrated its golden anniversary with a service offered by the Catholic Archbishop of Westminster at SS Alban and Stephen Church in the presence of the mayor of St Albans. The mass was followed by a tree-planting ceremony on the school grounds.

It was categorized in 2016 as a 'Good' school but remained a school with below average teachers.

On 13 January 2016, Prince William ate lunch with Breakspear students at John Henry Newman School as he waited for paramedics. The East Anglian Air Ambulance, of which the Duke of Cambridge was part of, frequently uses the Newman School fields.

The student leaders' take part in a trip to Hoima and Kasambya in Uganda supporting a charity; Kiddies Support Scheme (KiSS) helping families become self-sufficient. To date this team has led a school community to raise over £50000 for this charity.

As of a November 2023 Inspection the school was rated 'Outstanding'.

== House system ==
Breakspear has six houses, each named after a saint whose life is intended to serve as an example to the community. Students are assigned to one of the houses on entrance to the school in Year 7 where they remain until the end of 6th form; whenever possible younger siblings become a member of the same house.

Each member of staff is also attached to a house.

Each house has two designated Year 11 House Captains, and one Sixth Form House Leader, who aides in coordinating house teams, organise activities and events and represent their house at relevant meetings. Houses compete between themselves for the most point accumulated during both terms of the school year.

=== List of houses ===
- More House
- Soubirous House
- Lisieux House
- Kolbe House
- Bosco House
- Bakhita House

== School staff ==
List of Headteachers
| Name | Tenure | |
| Name | From | To |
|---|---|---|
| Daniel McCarthy | 1963 | 1970 |
| Malcolm Eastham | 1970 | 1991 |
| Paul Patrick | 1991 | 1997 |
| J C White | 1997 | 2005 |
| Phil Jakszta | 2005 | 2013 |
| Declan Linnane | 2014 | 2026 |
| Melanie Green | 2025 | 2026 |

As of March 2026 Andrew Dunne is the new current head teacher.

== Notable alumni ==
- Tom Cahill, Satoshi Ishida, and Sean Lemon - musicians who played in the band Saving Aimee.
- Matthew Connolly (b. 1987) - professional football player, he started his career at Arsenal and most notably played for Queens Park Rangers and Cardiff City.
- Nick Isiekwe (b. 1998) - professional English rugby union player.
