= Scuzz =

British rock music channel, 2003–2018

Programming
- Picture format: 16:9, 576i (SDTV)

Ownership
- Owner: British Sky Broadcasting (2003–2006); CSC Media Group (2006–2012); Sony Pictures Television (2012–2018); Channel Director Alex Herron (until May 2018), Oliver Route (May 2018 - Nov 2018)

History
- Launched: 17 April 2003
- Closed: 15 November 2018

Scuzz was a British 24-hour rock and metal music television channel owned and operated by Sony Pictures Television. It was launched on 17 April 2003 and went on to be the highest-rated rock TV station on the Sky satellite platform, available in over 12 million homes in the UK and Ireland. The channel was closed on 15 November 2018.

The channel broadcast mainstream rock, pop-punk, and metal, with unsigned and lesser known bands featuring in the late night show 'New Noise'. Scuzz tended to play a broader selection of music videos compared with the other British rock channels MTV Rocks and Kerrang! although K! and Scuzz did share quite a few songs. The channel was known to break many UK artists including Enter Shikari, Young Guns, You Me At Six, Bullet For My Valentine, Lower Than Atlantis and later Milk Teeth and Creeper. International bands were often first broadcast on Scuzz TV, the likes of Avenged Sevenfold, Sleeping With Sirens, Pierce The Veil, Letlive, All Time Low and Paramore all first appeared on UK TV on Scuzz.

== History ==
=== Sky ownership ===
In March 2003, British Sky Broadcasting announced they would enter the music television market and launch three themed channels - Scuzz, Flaunt, and The Amp.

Scuzz would launch with its sister networks on 17 April 2003. Scuzz through its life focused exclusively on the heavy metal and rock genres.

In September 2004, due to poor viewing figures and ratings, Sky announced that Chart Show Channels would take over operating Scuzz, Flaunt and The Amp beginning in January 2005, although they would retain full ownership in all three channels, alongside advertising control.

Scuzz was given a new look and revamp on 1 April 2006. Replacing the old black and white logo and song titles to a blue, smokey look. After the revamp the channel had begun to air more special, dedicated shows, such as a live performance from the metalcore group Trivium, and a weekend devoted to Swedish melodic death metal band In Flames.

=== CSC ownership ===
Sky announced in November 2006 that their music channels would go Free-to-Air beginning on 11 December, and soon afterwards transitioned full ownership to Chart Show Channels in December 2006, previously, Scuzz alongside its sister music channels were encrypted in NDS from its launch, and broadcasting on the Eutelsat 28A communications satellite meant that the channels could be viewed for the first time all across parts of Europe.

On 6 November 2007 Scuzz and its sister channels were removed from the ex-NTL Virgin Media areas following a failure of an agreement from Chart Show Channels for the networks to be made available in the ex-Telewest areas, alongside Virgin Media focusing more on their free On-Demand services.

On 21 December 2007, Scuzz was once again revamped; being given a much more industrial style look.

On 17 November 2008 a +1 timeshift of Scuzz, Scuzz +1, was launched. It was available 24 hours a day on Sky channel 375. This was CSC Media Group's third music timeshift, after launching Flaunt +1 and Bliss +1 earlier in the year, although both have since been closed down and replaced, with PopGirl +1 and allowing AnimeCentral to go 24 hours respectively. On 21 November, the channel was closed, with its EPG slot sold to NHK World TV.

On Tuesday 29 September 2009, Scuzz was removed from Freesat channel 502 for being too heavy and replaced with sister channel Flava. On 3 November 2010, NME TV was replaced with Scuzz on Freesat channel 503. On 15 July 2013, Scuzz was replaced by Chart Show Dance on Freesat channel 503. It returned to Freesat in August 2017, replacing Chart Show Hits just as they had replaced Scuzz four years earlier, but was removed along with Chart Show TV, Starz TV and Tiny Pop +1 on 31 July 2018.

On 5 June 2013, Scuzz swapped positions with Flava on Sky. The channel moved from 374 to 367 (to sit next to Kerrang!), while Flava moved from 367 to 374.

=== Sony ownership ===
On 2 March 2015, Scuzz launched Animax Movie Nights, a block, provided by Sony Pictures Television under the Animax brand, that aired anime films streamed on SVOD in the UK and Ireland by the British version of Animax, which launched on 24 October 2013, on Thursday nights.

After 15 years the channel closed on 15 November 2018, along with sister channel Sony Crime Channel 2 culminating with special shows celebrating the channel's history. The last video played on the channel was "Girl All the Bad Guys Want" by Bowling for Soup. "Resist" by Shadows Chasing Ghosts was the final video to be played in full, as the signal was cut halfway through the former.

== Music ==
The channel showed many exclusive music videos for their first time. Scuzz often played live concerts including Slipknot, Korn, Devildriver and 36 Crazyfists. Scuzz had band 'Take-Overs' where artists presented music video shows, as well as interviews with artists such as Ozzy Osbourne, Deftones, Machine Head and Kiss to smaller bands that are deemed up and coming.

They showed various interview shows including 'On Record', 'Scuzz Meets', 'The Lowdown' which centered around British rock festival 'Download Festival', and later a series called Access All Areas. Scuzz TV presenters included Terry 'Beez' Bezer, Sophie K, Daniel P. Carter, Jon Mahon, and Matt Stocks.

Scuzz had a presence at the majority of the UK, and some international rock festivals. Scuzz's festival partnerships at time of closure included:

- Download Festival
- Sonisphere
- Bloodstock Open Air
- Hevy Festival
- Slam Dunk Festival
- Vans Warped Tour USA
- Vans Warped Tour UK
- Mayhem Festival USA
- Hellfest France
- 2000 Trees Festival

=== On-air music video blocks/shows (at time of closure) ===
- Back2Back
- Rock All Stars
- New Noise
- Antiques Rock Show
- Ass-Kicking Metal
- #Rockbox (interactive block)
- Shredtime Stories

== On-air identity ==
The original Scuzz logo (17 April 2003 – 1 April 2006)

The second Scuzz logo (1 April 2006 – 21 December 2007)

The third Scuzz logo (21 December 2007 – 12 May 2011)

The fourth Scuzz logo (13 May 2011 – 24 February 2015)

The fifth and final Scuzz logo (24 February 2015 – 15 November 2018)
