= Flaunt =

Programming
- Picture format: 16:9, 576i (SDTV)
- Timeshift service: Flaunt +1 (6 May-4 June 2008, replaced by Pop Girl +1)

Ownership
- Owner: British Sky Broadcasting (2003–2006); CSC Media Group (2006–2010)

History
- Launched: 17 April 2003
- Closed: 17 March 2010
- Replaced by: Chart Show Dance (now Trace Latina)

Links
- Website: www.loveflaunt.com (no longer active)

Flaunt was an electronic dance music television channel. It was a captivating destination for dance music enthusiasts, owned and operated by the CSC Media Group. This esteemed channel focused on broadcasting an array of music videos from diverse dance genres, such dance, techno, trance, disco, Eurodance, house & dance-pop along with classic dance hits from the previous decades.

== History ==
=== Early history (2003–2004) ===
In March 2003, British Sky Broadcasting announced they would enter the music television market and launch three themed channels - Flaunt, Scuzz, and The Amp.

Flaunt would launch with its sister networks on 17 April 2003. For its launch, Flaunt focused on the pop and dance genres, with a female-oriented appeal for the first year of its existence, with a pink logo and a gray/white graphic scheme. The channel also aired entertainment programming from Red Carpet Bitch, hosted by British TV presenter Julian Bennett, which focused on celebrity gossip.

Following the channel's launch, Sky signed a deal with Channel 5 for Flaunt to become the new sponsor for the weekly Chart Show in June 2003. Flaunt also had first-time exclusive rights to air Popworld before Channel 4 aired it on their main channel which is a show made by Channel 4.

In September 2004, due to poor viewing figures and ratings, Sky announced that Chart Show Channels would take over operating Flaunt, Scuzz and The Amp beginning in January 2005, although they would retain full ownership in all three channels, alongside advertising control.

=== First Relaunch (2004–2006) ===
In October 2004, Flaunt received its first relaunch, gaining a new logo and a blue, circular graphics scheme. It had a parrot mascot during this period where he appeared in many of its idents. The idents were produced by Mark Chandler.

=== Relaunch as gay-oriented network (2006–2007) ===
On 25 May 2006, it was announced that Flaunt would relaunch on 1 July as a gay oriented music channel focusing mostly on gay icons like Kylie Minogue, Madonna, Cher and Cyndi Lauper. The channel relaunch coincided with EuroPride which, in 2006, was held in London. The channel had also undergone a new logo along with song title graphics which was a banner with twinkling stars in the bottom left side of the screen in 4:3 safe area. The channel idents around this time consisted of mostly shirtless men at the gym and disco ball shadow.

In November 2006, Sky announced that their music channels, including Flaunt, would transition to free-to-air broadcast beginning on 11 December. Afterwards, Sky transitioned full ownership of Flaunt, Scuzz and Bliss to Chart Show Channels. Previously, Flaunt alongside its sister music channels were encrypted in NDS from its launch, and broadcasting on the Eutelsat 28A communications satellite meant that the channels could be viewed for the first time all across parts of Europe.

=== Relaunch as a dance-focused channel (2007–2008) ===
Around this time, shortly after transitioning to a free-to-air (FTA) model, Flaunt made significant changes to its programming and shifted its focus away from its previous niche audience and towards a broader appeal in the dance music market. Prior to this reformat, the channel had already been featuring dance music content, but it had not yet fully committed to an all-dance music format. In March 2007, Flaunt underwent a major overhaul of its playlist and presentation design, aiming to cater to the dance music market while maintaining its newfound broader appeal. This shift was marked by the abandonment of its previous baby blue and pink glitter graphics and disco ball logo in favor of a purple and blue logo and swish effect graphics.

During this incarnation of Flaunt, the channel quickly gained popularity within the dance music scene by showcasing a diverse range of popular and classic dance tracks, as well as lesser-known obscure songs. The channel's programming featured a mix of established and up-and-coming artists, including Ferry Corsten, Paul van Dyk, Tiesto, Infernal, September, Chicane, and Freemasons. Additionally, Pete Tong, a well-known DJ and radio host, presented several shows on Flaunt during the WMC specials.

Flaunt's focus on house and euro music, featuring artists such as Freemasons, Axwell, Stonebridge, Solu Music, The Shapeshifters, Kate Ryan, and Jessy De Smet, helped establish the channel as a respected presence within the British dance music community. The channel's commitment to featuring a wide range of dance music styles and artists, as well as its special events like Flaunt Sessions, further solidified its reputation as a go-to destination for dance music fans.

On 6 November 2007, Flaunt and its sister channels were removed from the ex-NTL Virgin Media areas following a failure of an agreement from Chart Show Channels for the networks to be made available in the ex-Telewest areas, alongside Virgin Media wanting to focus more on their Free On-Demand services.

=== Relaunch as a thematic network and Closure (2008–2010) ===
In May 2008, Flaunt was rebranded with yet another new logo along with a new graphics set. This time they adopted a retro type font with a white logo and the graphics presentation were graphic equalisers. This period Flaunt begun to experiment with more thematic shows and became more trance-oriented during the late nights by playing videos from the likes of Solarstone, iiO, The Thrillseekers, Armin van Buuren, Above & Beyond, Richard Durand, Filo & Peri, Paul Oakenfold, DT8 Project, Ferry Corsten, and ATB.

On 6 May 2008, CSC Media Group launched the short lived Flaunt +1, a timeshift music channel, though the channel only lasted for four weeks. It was later replaced by Pop Girl +1.

Flaunt ceased broadcasting on 17 March 2010 and was replaced by Dance Nation TV.

== Former programming ==
- Flaunt Anthems
- Party Hard
- Get Up Flaunt It!
- Flaunt Classics
- 100% Dance
- Non Stop Party!
- Total Trance
- Nothing But...
- Weekender
- Flaunt Lounge
- Flaunt Party
- Twice as Nice
- Fresh 'n' Wild

== Ofcom licences mix-up/Flava TV channel ==
The problems started on Monday 18 February 2008, when the currently named "Flava" Ofcom Licence was renamed from its original name of Flaunt to Flava. This caused a major uproar about the fact that Flaunt, a 24/7 dance channel would be closed, in favour of Flava (a 24/7 Hip Hop/Urban/R&B music channel, similar to Kiss, MTV Base, Channel U, and B4). This however turned out to be an error on Ofcom's part, and they accidentally changed Flaunt when they were meant to change the B4 one. But on the following Monday, Ofcom corrected the problem by removing the B4 licence, keeping the newly renamed Flava licence, and adding a new Flaunt licence.

== Virgin Media removal ==
On 6 November 2007 Flaunt, along with Bliss and Scuzz, were removed from Virgin Media's ex-NTL platform as a deal with Chart Show Channels could not be made to make the channels available to their ex-Telewest platform.
