= Saving Aimee =

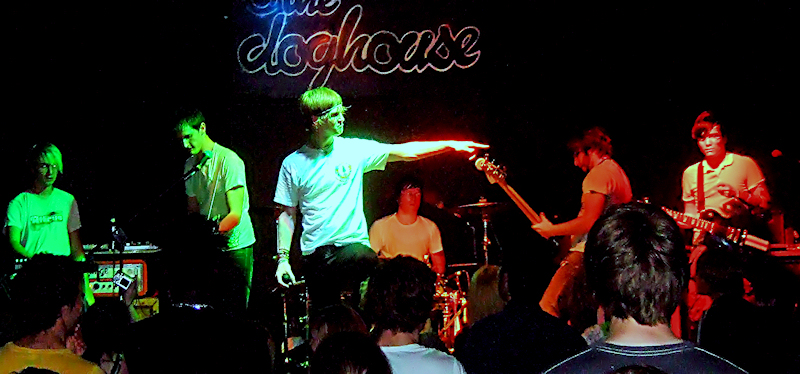
- Saving Aimee, Dundee 2008

Background information
- Origin: Hertfordshire, England
- Genres: Rock, new wave, pop
- Years active: 2005–2009 (on hiatus)
- Members: Luke Quinn; Sean Lemon; Satoshi Ishida; Tim Boardman; Tom Cahill; James Larner
- Website: myspace.com/savingaimee

Saving Aimee were a British pop rock band from Hertfordshire. The band toured extensively for four years, and released three singles and an album produced by Justin Hawkins from The Darkness. On 14 December 2009 the band went on an indefinite hiatus.

== History ==
The band formed in mid-2005. All members grew up together in St Albans, Cahill, Ishida and Lemon attended Nicholas Breakspear School. They recorded their first EP in 2006. Starting in 2007, the band toured throughout the UK, playing well over 350 shows. The band toured and played shows with the likes of McFly, Enter Shikari, Simple Plan, Fightstar, Kill Hannah, Justin Hawkins, The Ting Tings, The Blackout, Funeral for a Friend, We Are The Ocean, Don Broco, Frank Turner and Young Guns.

Saving Aimee's first release was the free download single "Small Talk" in July 2008. The song received airplay on BBC Radio 1 and received A-List rotation on Kerrang! Radio for four months, placing at No. 9 in the most played and requested songs of the year. The single received over 20,000 downloads.

In January 2009, the band had their first TV appearance, on BBC 2's BBC Switch.

In 2009, Saving Aimee started their own record label, Hey You!, distributed by Autonomy Music Group/Warner Brothers, with its first release being the single and album of the same name, We're The Good Guys.

The band's second single, "We're The Good Guys", from their debut record, was released on 3 August 2009. It was play-listed on Kerrang! Radio, and the BBC Radio 1 playlist for three weeks in July 2009. The single charted at No. 79 mid-week.

The band completed a national UK headline tour promoting their debut single in June/July 2009 with most of the shows selling out in advance. This included sell-out shows at the Newcastle and Birmingham O2 Academy 2 venues. The band also headlined the Redbull stage at Underage Festival, in the summer of 2009.

Their third single, "Fresh Since '88", was released on 11 October 2009, download only. It was on the Kerrang! Radio playlist.

== Band members ==
- Luke Quinn – lead vocals (2005–2009)
- Sean Lemon – synthesizer (2005–2009)
- Satoshi Ishida – lead guitar (2005–2009)
- Tim Boardman – rhythm guitar (2005–2009)
- Tom Cahill – bass (2005–2009)
- James Larner – drums (2005–2009)

== Discography ==
=== Studio albums ===
Release date	Album	Label
26 October 2009	We're the Good Guys	Hey You

=== Singles ===
Release date	Song	Album
16 July 2008	"Small Talk"	We're the Good Guys
3 August 2009	"We're the Good Guys"	We're the Good Guys
11 October 2009	"Fresh Since '88"	We're the Good Guys

== Videography ==
- "We're the Good Guys" (2009)
- "Fresh Since '88" (2009)
- "Small Talk" (2009)
