= Bliss (TV channel) =

British music television channel

Programming
- Picture format: PAL (576i, 16:9/Pillarbox)

Ownership
- Owner: Sony Pictures Television

History
- Launched: 2 March 2006
- Replaced: The Amp
- Closed: 27 November 2015

Bliss was a British music television channel owned and operated by the CSC Media Group, formerly known as Chart Show Channels.

== History ==
Bliss first logo (2006–2008)

Bliss was launched in March 2006, replacing The Amp. The channel was owned by British Sky Broadcasting and along with its sister channels Flaunt and Scuzz, which were operated by Chart Show Channels.

The channel was advertised with the tagline of "Total Chill-out Classics". The channel played classic pop songs and music from the 1970s to 1990s, with love songs and power ballads. Every day from 9:00 am to 12:00 pm and 7:00 pm to 10:00 pm, there was a weekly themed slot, such as Blissful Divas, female artists, or Bliss at The Movies. These themed slots changed every Monday.

The Bliss logo was a gold colour with a shine effect moving across it every few seconds. The logo was placed in the bottom left-hand corner during music videos, and the song information was shown in a gold-coloured bar at the start and near the end of each music video. The channel's identity was also seen before and after advertisement breaks, when the Bliss logo would slowly come out of an opening flower.

Sky announced in November 2006 that their music channels would go free-to-air, beginning on 11 December 2006, and soon afterwards, Sky transitioned full ownership to Chart Show Channels in December 2006. Previously, Bliss and its sister channels were encrypted in NDS from its launch, and broadcasting on the Eutelsat 28A communications satellite.

On 6 November 2007, Bliss and its sister channels were removed from the ex-NTL Virgin Media areas, following a failure of an agreement from Chart Show Channels for the networks to be made available in ex-Telewest areas and Virgin Media focusing more on their free on-demand services.

On 3 March 2008, the Bliss website launched.

On 12 May 2008, a timeshift channel called Bliss +1 was launched. It was available 24 hours a day on Sky Channel 363. On 2 June 2008, Bliss +1 was closed to make way for a 24-hour stream for AnimeCentral.

=== Relaunch and closure ===
In late 2008, its logo changed to plain white lettering with 'BLISS' in capitals.

On 1 February 2011, Bliss launched Freesat on Channel 517. It moved to Channel 506 on 13 September 2012. It was removed along with Flava on 21 July 2014.

Throughout November and December of 2013, Bliss became "Blissmas", a Christmas music channel playing Christmas music 24/7. Bliss programming changed between 10 and 20 November, with the exception of two years, when it started on 6 November and then on 1 November.

Bliss was shut down on 27 November 2015, after nine years, while in the middle of its annual run as Blissmas. In 2018, Christmas music moved to its sister music channel, Chart Show Hits (called Chart Show Dance at time of closure).
