= NME TV =

Programming
- Picture format: 16:9, 576i (SDTV)

Ownership
- Owner: CSC Media Group

History
- Launched: 22 November 2007
- Replaced: MinX
- Closed: 5 January 2012
- Replaced by: Chart Show TV +1 (now BuzMuzik)

NME TV was a British music television channel owned and operated by CSC Media Group (formerly Chart Show Channels), which carried the branding of the popular music publication NME under a brand licensing agreement. This was a similar arrangement to its radio station, NME Radio, which is operated by Town and Country Broadcasting. The channel replaced Minx on 22 November 2007. NME TV launched at 6.00am that day with "Up the Bracket" by The Libertines being the first video to be played on the channel.

On 3 November 2010, NME TV was replaced with Scuzz on Freesat channel 503. On 1 February 2011, NME TV relaunched on Freesat on channel 516.

NME TV closed on 5 January 2012 and was replaced with Chart Show TV +1, with "No Good (Start the Dance)" by The Prodigy being the final music video to be played on the channel. Chart Show TV +1 acted as a placeholder until the launch of BuzMuzik in May 2012.

== Logos ==
NME TV's logo (2007–2010)

NME TV's logo (2010-2012)
