= Trace Hits =

British and Irish music TV channel

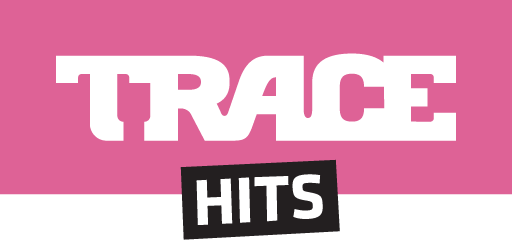
- Country: United Kingdom

Programming
- Picture format: 16:9 576i SDTV

Ownership
- Owner: CSC Media Group (2002–2014); Sony Pictures Television (2014–2018); Trace Group (2018–2023)
- Sister channels: Trace Vault; Trace Latina; Starz TV; Scuzz; Flava

History
- Launched: 16 September 2002; 24 years ago
- Closed: 27 April 2023
- Former names: Chart Show TV (2002–19); Trace Urban (2019–20)

Links
- Website: Official website

Trace Hits (formerly Chart Show TV and Trace Urban) was a British free-to-air music channel owned by Trace Group.

== History ==
Chart Show TV launched on 16 September 2002 and initially consisted of several different charts, mimicking the format of the television show upon which it was based. However, many of these were dropped and the channel started showing music videos.

The channel broadcast in 4:3 from its launch but switched to 16:9 on 4 February 2008. All of CSC Media Group's other music channels have also switched to 16:9 broadcasting. A new website for Chart Show TV is also under development since its sister channels have had new websites launched.

On 5 January 2012, Chart Show TV +1 launched, replacing NME TV. The temporary channel was replaced by BuzMuzik on 30 May 2012.

On 1 May 2014, Chart Show TV got a new look with a .tv screen (with 'chart show' being only seen at the beginning of a music video, not to be confused with the defunct channel .tv, which closed in 2001). However, Chart Show Dance continued to have the old look until 13 June 2014.

In December 2018, Trace Group acquired Chart Show TV from Sony Pictures Television.

On 1 November 2019, Chart Show TV was rebranded as Trace Urban following Trace's takeover of Sony's music channels. The last song played on Chart Show TV was "Big for Your Boots" by Stormzy when it was unexpectedly cut to Trace Urban with the first music being "I Wanna Be Down" by Brandy. The channel introduced blocks from former sister channels Starz TV and Trace Latina on 1 June 2020.

The channel became Trace Xmas, on 1 October 2020, taking over from defunct sister channel Starz TV. This was repeated in 2021 and in 2022.

On 5 January 2021, the channel was renamed Trace Hits.

The channel closed on 27 April 2023. The last video to be played on the channel was Fly Girl by Flo featuring Missy Elliott, but the signal was cut to a black screen halfway through the song.

=== Freeview ===
On 8 May 2014, Chart Show TV was launched on Freeview, on channel 67. It became a placeholder on 3 September 2014 along with the Freeview retune, and was removed from Freeview on all regions, including London, except in Manchester on 8 September.

It was removed from Manchester Freeview in November 2017, and was replaced with sister channel Trace Vault, though both channels could be found on Freeview via Channelbox (Freeview Channel 271) in the streamed section alongside 'GImux' channels Clubland TV, Country Music Entertainment and Now 90s.

On 27 June 2022, a trio of Trace music channels were launched on Channelbox with Trace Urban, Trace Latina and Trace Brazuca replacing Trace Vault and Trace Hits, in a section on channel 271 which now included Zoom, Balle Balle and Stingray's channels (Qello, CMusic and Karaoke) rather than Universal's Now Music channels.

== Former Programming ==
- Chart Show Chat - Music and interviews with artists and groups, presented by Stefanie Faleo.
- Chart Show's Top 20/40 Singles Chart - A weekly countdown of the top 20/40 singles with James Barr.
- Global Hits! - The world's biggest hits throughout the early breakfast hours.
- New Music Now! - The latest songs added to the Chart Show TV playlist.
- Pop Quiz, Let's Test ya! - A selection of pop music-related questions whilst showing the latest pop music videos.
- Request - An interactive show where a set of 4 songs at a time can be chosen by tweeting the relevant hashtag, the hashtag with the most votes is then played next and this process is repeated. Show was previously on Bliss and then Chart Show Dance.
- Top 20 Urban Chart Rollers - 20 biggest urban tracks of the week.
- Top 20 US Single Chart - Songs that are in position 20 to 1 on the week's US Single Chart.

== Trace UK ==
Trace UK
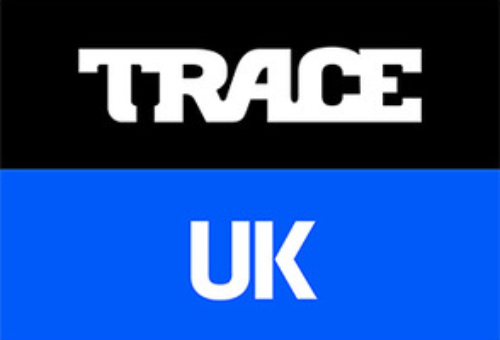
- Country: United Kingdom
- Broadcast area: United Kingdom

Programming
- Language: British English
- Picture format: HDTV 1080i

Ownership
- Owner: Trace Group
- Sister channels: Trace Urban; Trace Latina; Trace Brazuca

History
- Launched: 24 May 2023 (Samsung TV Plus); 3 July 2024 (Channelbox)

Links
- Website: trace.plus

Availability

Terrestrial
- Channelbox (Freeview): Channel 271

Streaming media
- Samsung TV Plus: Channel 4713

Trace UK is a British free-to-air music channel owned by the French Trace Group. It is the first UK-focused Trace music service since Trace Hits (formerly Chart Show TV and Trace Urban) was broadcast.

Trace UK appeared on the Channelbox programme guide on 21 June 2024 (found on Freeview channel 271) and can be found as a FAST channel on Samsung TV Plus Channel 4713.

It is one of four UK-focused channels the French Trace company currently runs, the other three being Trace Urban, Trace Latina and Trace Brazuca on Channelbox. Trace UK is a black music channel focusing on Hip-Hop, R&B, Grime and Drill.
