= Made Up Stories (album) =

Studio album by Go:Audio
- Released: 11 May 2009
- Recorded: 2007–2009
- Genre: Pop rock, indie pop, electronic rock
- Length: 41:46
- Label: Rubix
- Producer: Andy Green

Go:Audio chronology
Woodchuck EP (2008)	Made Up Stories (2009)

Singles from Made Up Stories
- 1. "Made Up Stories" Released: 26 May 2008; 2. "She Left Me" Released: 11 August 2008; 3. "Drive To The City" Released: 20 April 2009

Alternative cover
- Original Album Cover

Professional ratings
Review scores
Source	Rating
NME	2/10 stars
Kerrang!	(#1259, p53)
411mania	(3.25/5)
In the News	3/5 stars
Rock Sound	6/10 stars

Made Up Stories is the debut album from British music quartet Go:Audio and was due for release on 25 August 2008 but was pushed back to 19 January 2009 as the band wanted to release a third single.

The title track and lead single, Made Up Stories was released on 26 May 2008 and was well received, most notably receiving heavy rotation on Kerrang! radio and television stations. The single's B-side is the non-album track "Woodchuck's Revenge".

The music video for follow up single, She Left Me premiered in late June 2008 and was released on 11 August 2008. The single's B-side is the non-album track "Doesn't Really Matter".

In mid-2008, the original album was leaked, therefore a new track listing was announced. The song "He's Changed" was removed and two new songs were added: "This Isn't Hollywood" and "Drive To The City". On 10 January 2009, Go:Audio issued a blog announcing that they have postponed the release of their long-awaited album because of this reason.

Since we left Epic records back in August we have had 2 sold out UK tours, been nominated for Kerrang! Best newcomer and so many other things. The one thing we have been worried about is our album.

It's taken a while but we have the rights to our album "Made Up Stories". This means we can release it! However, we want to give you guys the best album we can possibly give you. That is why we are back in the studio recording a few more tracks for the album. One of them being our next single... (Out in April)

We promise it will come out soon. We also promise it will be better than the album that would have been released a few months ago. We are really sorry to make you wait. It's coming soon though... Stay with us.

The band's last single Drive To The City was released on 20 April 2009 and featured a live version of "Brake! Brake!", a demo of "All Because Of You", and a piano version of the song "Why".

The album was eventually released on 11 May 2009 and Go:Audio were due to play an album launch gig in Camden but the gig was cancelled because the drummer, Andy Booth broke his arm during a game of 5-a-side football.

Upon release, the album failed to gain a significant chart position, peaking at #95 on its first week of release.

== Track listing ==
1. "Made Up Stories" – 3:18
2. "Brake! Brake!" – 4:12
3. "She Left Me" – 2:54
4. "Drive To The City" – 3.11
5. "Woodchuck" – 2:41
6. "This Isn't Hollywood" – 3:45
7. "Save Me Now" – 3:58
8. "I'm With You" – 4:35
9. "So Quiet You Were" – 3:48
10. "Forget About It" – 3:41

=== Limited edition ===
11. "Why" – 4:10
12. "Take The Floor" – 4:06

== Personnel ==
- James Matthews – vocals
- Josh Wilkinson – keyboard, synthesizer
- Zack Wilkinson – guitars
- Andy Booth – drums, percussion
