= Pop (British and Irish TV channel) =

British children's television channel

- Logo used since 2015
- Type: Free-to-air channel (formerly); FAST channel
- Country: United Kingdom; Ireland
- Network: See separate section

Programming
- Language: English
- Picture format: 16:9 576i SDTV
- Timeshift service: Pop +1

Ownership
- Owner: CSC Media Group (2003–2014); Sony Pictures Television (2014–2021); Narrative Entertainment UK Limited (2021–present)
- Sister channels: Tiny Pop

History
- Launched: 29 May 2003; 23 years ago (linear television, as Toons&Tunes); 26 June 2003; 23 years ago (as Pop); 28 April 2016; 10 years ago (Pop Player); 13 September 2023; 3 years ago (FAST channel)
- Closed: 10 December 2025; 11 months ago (Pop Player); 1 January 2026; 10 months ago (linear television)
- Former names: Toons&Tunes (2003)

Pop (formerly known as Toons&Tunes) is a British FAST television channel and formerly a free-to-air children's television channel owned by Narrative Entertainment UK Limited, targeting audiences aged six to ten. The channel was launched on 29 May 2003, as Toons&Tunes by Chart Show Channels (CSC) Media Group, it was renamed as Pop the following month and was sold to Sony Pictures Television in 2014, before Sony sold it and its sister channels to its current owner in 2021.

== History ==
Pop was originally launched on 29 May 2003, by Chart Show Channels (CSC) Media Group as Toons&Tunes. Toons&Tunes was then rebranded as its current name, Pop, in the following month. In September 2003, a timeshift sister network, Pop Plus, was launched. Originally, the network focused on music videos with animated programming also part of the schedule, but with the numerous music video network options on British television at the time, and the increase of adult content in music videos, this focus was abandoned in 2004, with animated content becoming more prominent. Music videos continued to air on and off until 2010, when they were abandoned entirely. Initially, the channel broadcast animated content sourced from Granada Media's programming library under a six-month non-exclusive deal, before transitioning to content sourced mainly from DIC Entertainment and Nelvana. In 2004, a sister channel, Tiny Pop, was launched, a preschool channel aimed at children under the age of seven.

The name Pop was chosen as a gap between the preschool and commercial music markets, as well as an attempt at joining another lucrative market, advertisements for toys and video games, in an attempt made by CSC to diversify its assets. The programming began to expand in August 2003, when it signed a non-exclusive six-month agreement with Granada Television (shortly before ITV plc was created).

In the channel's early years, links were presented by Rorry, formerly known as Tricky, an animated lime green dragon who previously hosted a Saturday morning show on ITV in 1997, but was retooled for the Pop channel. Tricky spoke with a northern English dialect, while Rorry spoke in a different voice with a Scottish accent, both versions were animated live through computer cues. He was accompanied by Purrdy, a dragon/cat hybrid who also appeared in the original Tricky programme on ITV, it was sometimes followed by a programme known as The Cheeky Monkey Show which featured the live links of the animated coloured monkeys known as "The Cheeky Monkeys".

On 10 August 2007, a one-hour timeshift service, Pop +1, was launched on Sky, alongside Tiny Pop +1. On 11 October, the channel was launched on Virgin Media, alongside Tiny Pop.

3D Logo of Pop

On 1 February 2011, Pop was removed from Virgin Media due to the cable launch of True Entertainment, which replaced it on the service.

On 20 March 2014, Pop was launched on Freeview. Prior to April 2016, Pop was only available in areas where a local television channel was available. On 14 July 2014, Pop +1 was relaunched on Sky, replacing Kix +1.

On 1 April 2016, Pop moved to a wider coverage nationwide freeview mix, becoming available to over 90% of the country. The capacity vacated by Pop on the local multiplex was used to transmit Kix starting on 7 April 2016. Pop +1 moved to LCN channel 128, with channel 127 being used for Kix, but was otherwise unaffected, continuing to broadcast locally to Manchester only until its eventual withdrawal from Freeview.

On 1 September 2020, Pop rebranded its on-air identity, with the premiere of Bakugan: Armored Alliance. The Pokémon franchise also premiered on Pop the same day, starting with Pokémon Journeys: The Series, moving from its previous broadcasters, ITV and CITV.

On 9 November 2022, Narrative Entertainment announced the launch of a FAST channel, Pop Kids, which streamed on Samsung TV Plus, the FAST network aired shows from Pop and Tiny Pop.

On 19 July 2023, Pop reverted to broadcasting on the local television multiplex, with its nationwide freeview channel replaced by sibling film channel Great! Romance. In September 2023, it was announced that Pop Kids would split into two FAST channels, with Tiny Pop having its own channel, and with Pop replacing the previous FAST channel.

On 7 February 2024, Pop and other Narrative Entertainment channels were removed from Freesat.

On 1 December 2024, the terrestrial broadcast versions of Pop and Tiny Pop were replaced by hybrid streaming channels on Freeview.

=== Closure as a linear channel ===
On 4 November 2025, Narrative Entertainment announced that both Pop and Tiny Pop's linear television feeds, as well as the Pop Player, would close in December. Pop and Tiny Pop continue broadcasting on their FAST channels, available on various services such as Freeview and Samsung TV Plus, after the closure.

On 19 August 2026, it was announced that Pop, along with Great! TV and the other Great! channels will be added to TiVo devices.

== Programming ==
The channel sourced its programming from multiple production and distribution studios. Programming included original shows such as Swipe It! With Joe Tasker, and acquired programming such as Miraculous: Tales of Ladybug & Cat Noir and Pokémon. The channel also aired films and specials such as the Barbie television films, Pokémon and Monster High.

== Related services ==
=== Pop +1 ===
Final timeshift logo used from 2015 to 2026

A timeshift feed titled Pop +1 was available until 2008, when it was replaced by Kix!. Pop +1 was relaunched on 14 July 2014, replacing Kix's +1 feed.

=== Pop Kids ===
A FAST channel titled Pop Kids launched on Samsung TV Plus in November 2022, airing programs from both Pop and Tiny Pop. The channel was split into two channels, Pop and Tiny Pop in September 2023.

=== Pop Up ===
Pop Up is a FAST channel on Freeview and other FAST channel providers such as Samsung TV Plus and LG Channels that launched on 30 May 2024. The channel features programming from a single franchise within a few weeks at a time.

== International versions ==
=== Nigeria ===
A Pop channel in Nigeria was launched on StarTimes in 2014.

=== Italy ===
On 13 April 2017, Sony Pictures Television announced that they would launch an Italian version of Pop on 4 May, replacing Neko TV following Sony's acquisition of the Television Broadcasting System, making it their first free-to-air offering in the country. The channel broadcast similar programming to its UK counterpart.

The Italian network, in addition to its sister channel Cine Sony, had low ratings in the country; and on 7 May 2019, Sony announced they had put both channels up for sale. Mediaset would acquire these channels, and on 11 July, Pop's channel slot was given to their Boing SpA joint-venture with Turner Broadcasting System Europe and was replaced with Boing Plus, a sister network to Boing. The last programme aired on Pop Italy was Larva.

=== Pakistan ===
The Pakistani version of Pop is operated by Edutainment (Pty.) Ltd. under the license from Sony Pictures Television.
