= Trace Vault =

British television channel

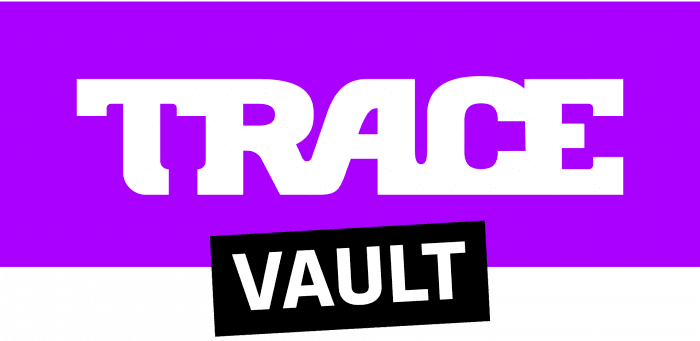
- Country: United Kingdom

Programming
- Picture format: 16:9 576i SDTV

Ownership
- Parent: CSC Media Group (2003–2019); Trace Group (2019–2023)

History
- Launched: 12 March 2003; 23 years ago
- Replaced: Chart Shop TV
- Closed: 14 December 2023; 2 years ago
- Former names: Video Vault (2003); The Vault (2003–2019)

Links
- Website: Official website

Trace Vault (formerly Video Vault and The Vault) was a British free-to-air music and entertainment television channel owned by Trace Group.

On 1 November 2019, the channel rebranded as Trace Vault following TRACE's takeover of Sony's music channels. The first song on the new TRACE Vault was "Crank That (Soulja Boy)" by Soulja Boy Tell'em.

== History ==
Chart Show Channels launched Video Vault as a late night (3 am to 6 am) service within Chart Show TV's downtime on 12 March 2003, replacing Chart Shop TV. It was renamed The Vault on 16 July 2003 and increased hours to 8 pm to 6 am, moving to Pop's broadcast capacity, and then expanded to 24 hours a day on 17 September 2003. The channel played nostalgic music and classic pop from the 1960s onwards, occasionally featuring music videos and concert footage from as early as at least the 1950s.

The Vault logo was on screen in the top left-hand corner during music videos and the song information faded in and out, at the bottom of the screen, at the start and near the end of each music video.

The Vault rebranded with a new logo and graphics presentation on 29 April 2010 along with newly themed content and a much more diverse mix of classic pop, classic dance, classic rock, classic RnB, love songs and chill out music throughout the previous 25 years. By 2011, the channel focused on old and new pop music. A further rebrand took place in 2014. Another rebrand happened in 2016 with some entertainment shows from the 90s being added gradually.

The channel was launched on Freeview in November 2017, replacing Chart Show TV, but was removed on 7 November 2018 and its slot being replaced by its former sister channel True Movies +1. The channel was also available on Freesat channel 501 since the platform's launch until its removal on 21 October 2019, when it was replaced by Christmas Starz.

"Cry Me a River" by Justin Timberlake was the final song to be played before the rebrand, but the song was cut part way through as happened on the network's sister channels.

After 20 years of operation, the channel closed on 14 December 2023, with the final song to be played was We're All in This Together from High School Musical. Similar to other Sony/Trace networks, the channel froze on the video halfway through, briefly showcasing a technical fault slide.

== Programming ==
=== Music programming ===
- 80s Ballads - The best power ballads from the 1980s.
- Back to... - All the biggest songs from a certain year.
- Battle of the... - Music from artists or bands based on different themes.
- Best of the 1980s - Hit music videos from the 1980s.
- Best of the 1990s - The best music from the 1990s.
- Cuddle up with Vault - Relaxing chill-out music.
- Feel Good Anthems
- Greatest Number 2s - The best songs to reach number two from different years.
- Hits from Flix - The best music from top films.
- Hunkz and Honeyz - Classic videos featuring the best artists.
- Infinite Classics - All-time classic songs.
- Karaoke Klassics - A collection of classic karaoke songs.
- Motown Classics - Classic motown music videos.
- Number 1s at One - The best chart topping songs from previous years.
- Number 1s of... - Number one songs from a chosen year.
- Number 2s at Two - Classic songs from previous years that made it to number two in the charts.
- Original vs Cover - A collection of original songs and their cover versions.
- Rise and Shine - Classic music videos.
- Same but Different - Different songs with shared titles.
- Saturday Nite Party - Classic party anthems.
- Thank Classic it's Friday! - The best feel good music.
- The Greatest No. 1s of the 80s - The best number one songs from the 1980s.
- The Greatest No. 1s of the Noughties - Big hit number one songs.
- The Very Best of... - The biggest songs from a chosen year.
- Thru the Years - A look back at the life and music of a particular artist or band.
- Top 5 at 5... - The best five songs from an artist.
- Top 10 Hits - A countdown of the top 10 songs from different years.
- Top 20 80s Ballads - A countdown of the 1980s top 20 power ballads.
- Vault Classics - Non-stop classic music videos.
- Vault Hits - The best music from the last five years.
- Vault Loves... Non-stop music from a certain artist or band.
- Vault's Pub Jukebox - The best classic songs.
- Vault's Top 10 - The top 10 classic videos from a particular year.
- Vault @ Nite - Non-stop classic music videos.
- Vault's Best Selection - A collection of the best classic songs.
- Videos from The Vault - Hit songs from previous years.
- Weekend Wake up - Classic music videos.
- What was Big in...? - The biggest news in showbiz from a certain year.
- Where are They Now?... - Best songs from that particular artist.

=== Entertainment shows ===
- Sabrina the Teenage Witch
- Sweet Valley High
- Malibu, CA
- Saved by the Bell
- Saved by the Bell: The College Years
- Saved by the Bell: The New Class
- Clarissa Explains it All
- Kenan & Kel
- Moesha*
- The Parkers*
- Sister, Sister
- Clueless
- The Simple Life
- USA High
- Mighty Morphin Power Rangers
The original Vault logo (2003–2010)

The logo used from 2010 to 2014

The final logo for The Vault used from 2014 to 2019

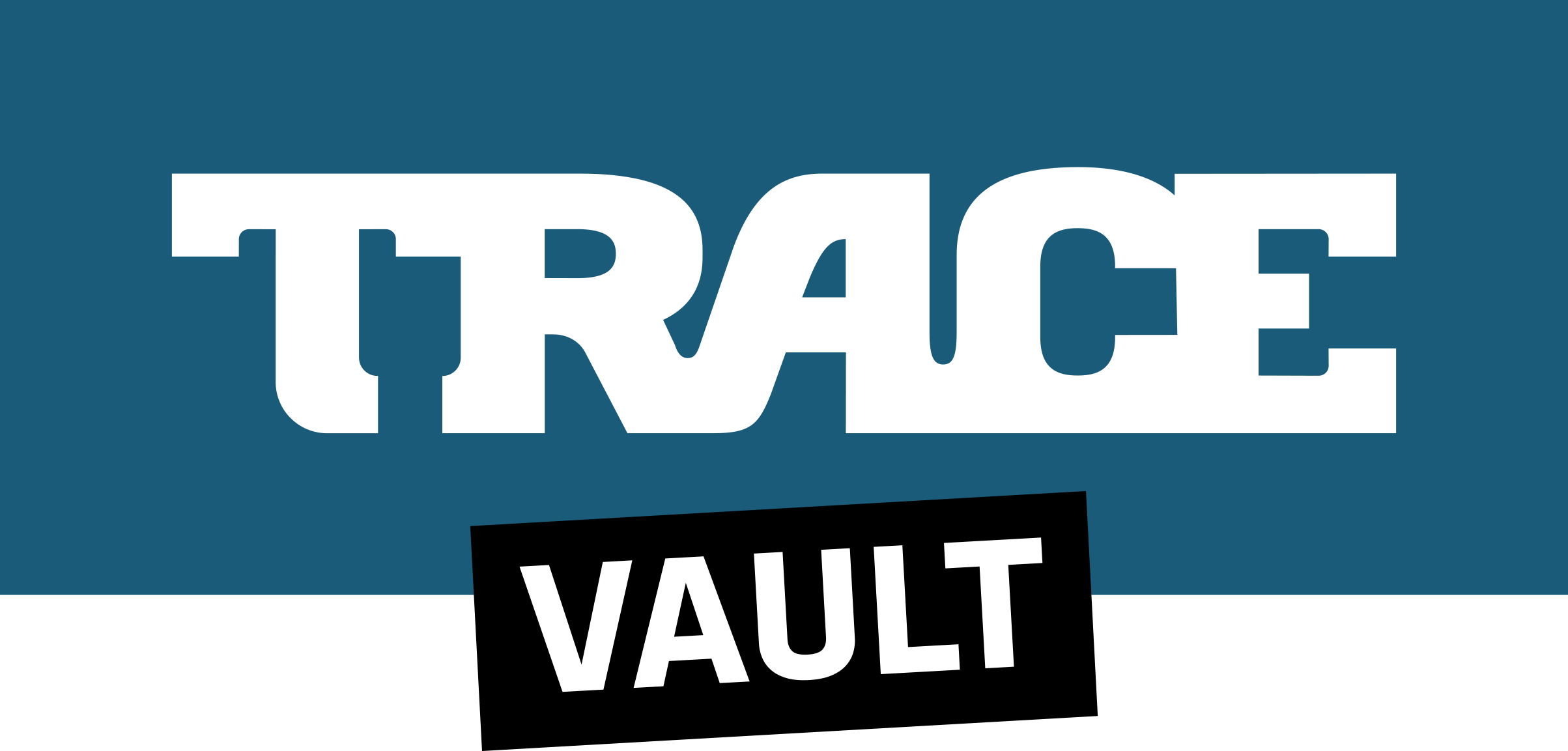
Trace Vault logo used from 2019 to 2020
