= True Movies 2 =

Ownership
- Owner: Sony Pictures Television; (CSC Media Group)
- Sister channels: True Movies

History
- Launched: 20 March 2006
- Closed: 30 September 2016
- Replaced by: True Movies+1

Links
- Website: truemovies.com

True Movies 2 was a British free-to-air television channel that was owned by Moving Movies Ltd., majority owned by CSC Media Group (formerly Chart Show Channels). It was launched on 20 March 2006 and was a sister channel from True Movies which was launched on 29 April 2005. True Movies 2 initially broadcast for two hours in the early morning, from 4 a.m. to 6 a.m. by timesharing with Pop, a children's cartoon channel. The service was later extended to 24 hours a day.

True Movies 2 was aimed especially at a female audience with its movies dedicated to true life dramas, which are mostly made-for-TV movies.

Reception of the channel did not require any special Sky or Freesat equipment nor subscription, any free to air receiver can pick up the channel. The channel was temporarily rebranded from 19 May to 2 June 2014 as True Murder. From 30 September 2016, the channel was replaced by True Movies +1.
