= Starz TV =

Former British music video channel

Programming
- Picture format: 16:9 576i SDTV

Ownership
- Owner: Video Interactive Television (2005–2009); Mushroom TV (2009–2012); Cloud Television One Limited (2012–2014); Sony Pictures Television (2014–2018); TRACE Group (2018–2020)
- Sister channels: Trace Latina; Trace Urban; Trace Vault

History
- Launched: 24 January 2005
- Replaced: BuzMuzik (Freesat)
- Closed: 1 June 2020
- Former names: Fizz (2005–2009)

Starz TV (formerly Fizz TV) was a British free-to-air music channel, owned by TRACE Group.

== History ==
Fizz TV was launched on 24 January 2005 on Sky, although the channel began test transmissions on 10 January. The output of the station was music videos from a range of genres that were popular in the charts. The channel also had a heavy interactive texting element, through the viewers being able to send in text messages and pictures that were shown on screen.

The parent company of Channel U and Fizz TV, Video Interactive Television, went into voluntary liquidation at the beginning of February 2009, before being purchased by Mushroom TV. When purchasing the two channels, Mushroom TV agreed that Channel U and Fizz TV should be rebranded. The two channels were rebranded as Channel AKA and Starz TV on 16 March 2009.

On 22 June 2012, Mushroom TV entered liquidation. Ofcom's television broadcast licensing update for May 2012, indicates that Starz TV was sold to Cloud Television One Limited.

From 2014 to 2018, it was owned by Sony Pictures Television, before being acquired by TRACE Group on 13 December 2018 along with its three sister music channels.

On 15 April 2014, Starz TV was launched on Freesat, replacing BuzMuzik, which was closed 12 days earlier. It was removed from there along with Chart Show TV, Scuzz and Tiny Pop +1 on 31 July 2018. On 21 October 2019, the channel returned to Freesat, replacing The Vault.

On 1 October 2019, the channel rebranded temporarily as Christmas Starz. At the same time, the channel also adopted a new logo, which continued on following the reversion to Starz TV on 7 January 2020.

The channel closed on 1 June 2020 along with Trace Latina, with its content moving to a block on Trace Urban in the mornings. The last song on the channel was "Barbie Girl" by Aqua, before cutting off partly through the video, similar to former sister channels Flava and Scuzz's closures.

== Programming ==
- Breakfast Bangers!
- Hot New Beats & Party Anthems
- Super Fresh Fridays!
- Weekend Pre Party Jamz
- Massive Weekend Anthems
- 10 Hottest hits right now
