= True Movies =

British television channel

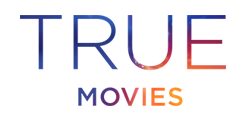

Ownership
- Owner: CSC Media Group (2005-2014); Sony Pictures Television (2014-2019)
- Sister channels: True Movies 2; True Entertainment

History
- Launched: 21 March 2005; 21 years ago
- Closed: 10 September 2019; 7 years ago
- Replaced by: Sony Movies Classic
- Former names: Movies 333 (Early 2005); True Movies 1 (2011–16)

Availability

Terrestrial
- Freeview (Manchester only): Channel 50; Channel 62 (+1)

Streaming media
- Black (South Africa): Channel 242

True Movies was a British free-to-air television channel. It was also distributed in Africa on DStv. It is the first channel from Moving Movies Ltd., majority-owned by CSC Media Group (formerly Chart Show Channels).

The channel was dedicated to true-to-life drama films, mostly made for TV. It showed films from a range of cinematic genres including crime, drama, animation, action and docusoaps, mostly based on real-life events.

== History ==
Prior to True Movies' launch on 29 April 2005, the channel was previously an unnamed part-time service found on TWC Re:Loaded from 1 March 2005, before being renamed as Movies 333 on 21 March 2005.

Soon after its launch, True Movies topped all the film channels in August 2005, with a 0.5% audience viewing share, higher than the established subscription Sky Movies 1 (0.4%) and Turner Classic Movies (0.3%). With the arrival of other film channels and services in 2006, its audience share dropped to between 0.1% to 0.2%.

True Movies' sister channel, True Movies 2, was launched on 20 March 2006, with similar programming. The channel was renamed True Movies 1 from 2011, but after the closure of True Movies 2 in 2016 it was renamed back to True Movies.

On 6 September 2011 the channel was made available on Virgin Media Ireland.

From 2013 til 2018, the channel temporarily rebranded to True Christmas, from late September to early January - during which time it would only show Christmas films.

On 26 October 2015 the channel was made available on Freeview in areas that support local TV. Now only broadcasting between 9 pm and 5 am although it might have different times on various local multiplexes around the country. For example - in London (on 24 January 2018) it showed as 1 pm to 7 am in the EPG and was off-air (as predicted by the EPG) at 12 noon. On 19 October 2017, True Movies is now in all platforms on Freeview channel 62, moving from Local TV to COM6 however the channel was known as True Christmas by this time, but on 4 April, True Movies began to broadcast 24 hours a day and full time on Freeview. On 27 June 2019 True Movies moved to Freeview channel 50, and its +1 service moved to its old spot on Freeview channel 62.

On 24 July 2019, it was announced that the channel would be closed and replaced by Sony Movies Classic (now Great! Romance) on 7 January 2020, which took effect after the temporary seasonal replacement Sony Movies Christmas on 10 September 2019.

== Programming ==
An example of some of the films shown on True Movies:

- Assault at West Point
- Before Women Had Wings
- Dangerous Child
- David's Mother
- Death of a Cheerleader
- Deep in My Heart
- Fatal Love
- First Do No Harm
- Fifteen and Pregnant
- God Bless the Child
- Invisible Child
- Noble House
- Our Sons
- Perfect Murder, Perfect Town
- Saved by the Light
- Sudie and Simpson
- The Amy Fisher Story
- The Day of the Roses
- Without Evidence
