= Tiny Pop =

British FAST television channel of Narrative Entertainment UK Limited

- Logo used since 2018
- Type: Free-to-air channel (formerly); FAST channel
- Country: United Kingdom

Programming
- Language: English
- Picture format: 16:9 1080i HDTV
- Timeshift service: Tiny Pop +1

Ownership
- Owner: CSC Media Group (2003–2014); Sony Pictures Television (2014–2021); Narrative Entertainment UK Limited (2021–present)
- Sister channels: Pop

History
- Launched: 8 September 2003; 23 years ago (linear television, original, as Pop Plus); 27 July 2004; 22 years ago (as Tiny Pop); 13 September 2023; 3 years ago (FAST channel); 21 August 2024; 2 years ago (linear television, relaunch)
- Replaced: Great! Real (linear television, relaunch)
- Closed: 20 March 2024; 2 years ago (linear television, original); 1 January 2026; 9 months ago (linear television, relaunch)
- Replaced by: Great! Real (linear television, original); Pop Player (website)
- Former names: Pop Plus (2003–2004)

Tiny Pop (styled as Tiny POP) is a British FAST television channel and formerly a free-to-air children's television channel owned by Narrative Entertainment UK Limited. Broadcast on many of the major digital television platforms in the UK, Tiny Pop, which was launched on 8 September 2003 as Pop Plus, caters for a target audience of children aged 7 and under. The station broadcasts principally animated content sourced from various distributors.

== History ==
=== As Pop Plus ===
The channel began on 8 September 2003 as Pop Plus, a secondary service to Pop. The channel was licensed to air animation and music, it operated the same broadcast hours as its sister channel (6am to 8pm at the time; Pop later expanded to its current 24-hour service) and was not a direct timeshift of its sibling, instead offering an alternative mix of the channel's content. (At one point the arrangement was that whilst Pop was showing music Pop Plus would show cartoons, and vice versa, but this was not always the case).

=== As Tiny Pop ===
On 27 July 2004, it was relaunched as Tiny Pop, which allowed the main Pop to refocus on slightly older children and reduce its use of preschooler shows.

Tiny Pop initially broadcast on satellite TV – Sky (channel 615) from the channel's launch, and Freesat (channel 605) from the launch of the platform in 2008.

On 11 October 2007, Tiny Pop was launched on Virgin Media, along with its sister channel Pop. Pop was removed in 2011, but was brought back on 25 August 2016. The station has also been made available over other cable systems.

On 14 July 2016, Tiny Pop +1 was temporarily replaced by Pop Max. The channel aired back-to-back episodes of a show from Pop. Tiny Pop +1 returned on 1 December 2016. The channel ran a second time from 9 February 2017 to 25 April 2017.

On 13 September 2023, Tiny Pop was available as a fast channel on Samsung TV Plus and Rakuten TV.

=== Closure as a linear channel ===
On 30 January 2024, it was announced Tiny Pop would move to online-only operations from 20 March 2024. It was replaced with a new channel concept, Great! Real. The new channel would only last five months before Tiny Pop returned to linear broadcasting over the same slots and channel space on 21 August.

In December 2024, Tiny Pop's website was closed down and was redirected to the Pop Player website.

The final of Tiny Pop +1 logo was used from 2018 to 2026

On 4 November 2025, Narrative Entertainment announced that both Pop and Tiny Pop’s linear television feeds, as well as the Pop Player, would close in December. Pop and Tiny Pop would move to the FAST feed, available on various services such as Freeview and Samsung TV Plus, after the closure.

== Freeview ==
On 23 October 2014, Tiny Pop was launched on Freeview, running daily from 3 pm to 7 pm in a slot timeshared with the Community Channel. It became a full-time channel on 15 March 2017.
