= Flava (TV channel) =

- Logo introduced in 2012

Programming
- Picture format: 16:9, 576i (SDTV)

Ownership
- Owner: Sony Pictures Television

History
- Launched: 12 July 2004
- Closed: 1 November 2017
- Former names: B4 (2004–2008)

Links
- Website: www.essentialflava.com

Flava was a British hip-hop music television channel owned by Sony Pictures Television. Launched in June 2004 as B4 TV by CSC Media Group, Flava broadcast hip-hop, urban, and R&B music from the late 1970s to the 2010s. It also occasionally aired films and original programming. The channel promoted itself as "100% Old Skool Hip-Hop/R&B 24/7."

== History ==
Flava launched on 12 July 2004 as a test channel named B4, focusing on pop and dance music. It played pre-release music videos and allowed viewers to request songs.

B4 was available 24 hours a day on Sky channel 357 and was part of CSC Media Group's suite of music channels. The channel also produced an early morning music program that aired on Channel 4 from 2004, featuring new music videos scheduled for UK release.

The rebranding of B4 to Flava was indicated by a change in the Ofcom license and program guide references by early March 2008. Flava officially launched on 26 March 2008, as an all-urban music channel.

On 29 September 2009, Flava began broadcasting on Freesat channel 502, replacing Scuzz. On June 5, 2013, Flava swapped positions with Scuzz on Sky, moving from channel 367 to 374.

On 21 July 2014, Flava, along with Bliss, was removed from Freesat. On 23 April 2017, Flava introduced a new logo and updated its graphics, changing from blue to black, with red and yellow accents. The channel rebranded as a 100% Old Skool Hip Hop and R&B channel on 2 May 2017.

Flava abruptly ceased broadcasting on 1 November 2017, with Juicy by The Notorious B.I.G. as the final music video. The channel was subsequently removed from program guide references.

== Programming ==
- 99 Problems: Rap Anthems - We've got 99 rap anthems for you right now, so keep it Flava for Old Skool Eminem, Jay Z, Dr Dre, Snoop, 2Pac & more.
- A-Z of Hip Hop - The ultimate countdown of the best Hip-Hop videos from artists A-Z.
- Bass Believers - A collection of the best drum 'n' base tunes.
- Big Tunes Fo' Shizzle - Non stop variety of Hip Hop Music
- Block Rockin Beatz - A mix of big urban tunes.
- Brand New! This Weeks Hottest - Brand new music, and the biggest new hip-hop and R&B music.
- Breakfast Beats - Non-stop hip hop, rnb & drum 'n' bass music.
- Britain's Next Urban Superstar with Jordan Kensington - The nationwide talent search ran by Jordan Kensington.
- Charlie Sloth's Old Skool Takeover - BBC Radio 1Xtra presenter Charlie Sloth chooses his selection of old skool hip hop music.
- Dope Morning Beats - The latest urban music on a morning.
- Double Up - Back to back videos from the best urban artists around.
- Drum 'n' Bass - A mix of the finest drum 'n' base music.
- First for Flava - A collection of the newest urban music videos.
- Flava at the Flicks - The best hip-hop music from movies
- Freshest Beats - The latest urban music.
- Garage Anthems - The best in new and classic garage tunes.
- Godfathers of Hip Hop - The best music from male urban artists.
- Hip Hop Download Chart - A countdown of the weeks most downloaded Hip-Hop tracks.
- Hip Hop Number Ones - A collection of Hip-Hop number ones from recent years.
- Hip Hop Vs Garage - A mash up of Hip-Hop and garage music.
- Hip Hop Xplosion - A mix of the biggest Hip-Hop music.
- In The Mix - The biggest urban, hip-hop, pop and R&B tunes, in the mix!
- In The Mix: 90s Hip-Hop Anthems - Rap classics from the 90s, in the mix.
- Masters of Hip Hop - Music from the founders of Hip-Hop.
- Morning Rewind - Hip Hop from the 80s, 90s & 00s on a morning.
- Non Stop Flava - Non-stop R&B and Hip-Hop music.
- Official Flava Urban Chart - Get your daily fix of the hottest RnB, Hip Hop, grime and dance tracks in our massive Top 20 countdown.
- Party Flava - Classic urban party tunes.
- #PLAY - Interactive twitter block
- #PLAY: Eminem and Friends - A special edition of #PLAY reserved for songs by Eminem and his collaborators.
- #PLAY: Movie Soundtracks - A special edition of #PLAY featuring hip-hop music from movies.
- R&B Download Chart - A countdown of the most downloaded R&B songs each week.
- R&B Singles Chart - Countdown of the weeks' top R&B music.
- Scratch Masters - Back to back scratch tunes from the experts.
- Something for da Honeyz - The best music from male RnB/Hip-Hop artists.
- Straight Outta Old Skool - Hip Hop from the 80s, 90s & 00s
- The Jump Off - A collection of Hip-Hop music with the loudest beats.
- Top 10 Biggest Tracks Now - The latest top 10 hottest urban tunes.
- Top 20 Bad Boyz of Hip Hop - Countdown of the best male artists in Hip-Hop.
- Top 20 Buff Boys - We unleash 20 of the buffest boys in hip hop music!
- Turn Up The Flava - A collection of the best R&B music from the last two years.
- Urban Beats - The best new and classic R&B and Hip-Hop music.
- Urban Cutz - The latest R&B and Hip-Hop music.
- Wake Up wit Flava - A mix of the latest new music.
- Westwood TV - Interviews with artists from the hip hop scene
- xXx: State of the Union

=== B4 programming ===
- B4 Breakers - A countdown of the top ten most selected videos.
- B4 Breakfast - An energetic mix of the latest pre-release songs.
- B4 Dawn - Music from new artists and groups.
- B4 Hits - A selection of the newest music.
- B4 Loves... - An hour dedicated to the life and music of one artist or group.
- B4's Big Ones - A mix of the biggest and best hits.
- B4's Hot Hits - All the latest and most requested music videos.
- B4's Lovin' - The most requested new music.
- B4's Most Selected - The top ten most requested music videos.
- Brand New - All the biggest and newest music videos.
- First on Friday - All the latest music videos every Friday.
- Fresh New Tracks - A showcase of brand new music videos.
- Most Requested - Songs most requested by the viewers.
- Out Tomorrow - Brand new music that's released tomorrow.
- Today's Most Selected - An hour of music videos selected by viewers.
- Top 5 - Five non interrupted songs from an artist or group.
- Top Ten Bands to See This Week - A countdown of the top ten best bands to see in concert.
- Videos to Cure a Hangover - A mix of the best non-stop music.
- Wake Up with B4 - A selection of fresh new music videos.
