= Tony Bastable =

British television presenter

- Born: 15 October 1944; Hexham, Northumberland, United Kingdom
- Died: 29 May 2007 (aged 62); Redhill, Surrey, United Kingdom
- Occupations: Television presenter and producer
- Spouses: June Buchan (1969 - 1971) (divorced); Jacqueline Colkett (1974 - 1992) (divorced); Anita Westwood (2001 -2007) (his death)
- Children: 1

Anthony Leslie Bastable (15 October 1944 – 29 May 2007) was an English television presenter, who was one of the original presenters of the children's magazine programme Magpie.

== Early life ==
Bastable was born in Hexham, Northumberland, in 1944. After moving to Wembley, Middlesex, he attended Wembley Manor School from 1952 to 1955 and University College School in Frognal, London.

On leaving school he trained to be a school teacher, teaching British History part-time at Buckingham College School in Harrow, Middlesex, whilst also working as a reporter for local newspapers.

== Television career ==
In the early 1960s, Bastable applied for a job as a television news reporter for Southern Television, but was turned down for being "too young". Instead he was given a job presenting a children's programme. Within 18 months he was working for ATV as a presenter of children's shows, sports magazines and schools' programmes. In 1968 he moved to Thames Television and began presenting Magpie, a new children's programme, with Susan Stranks and Pete Brady. Magpie was effectively a "groovier" version of the BBC's Blue Peter. In 1972, he became Magpie's producer.

During his career, Bastable produced and presented many one-off programmes, including historical documentaries and current affairs programmes, and presented and commentated on many outside and sporting events. These included: Problems (1976–77), a programme on sexual issues, firstly with Claire Rayner and then with Jenny Conway and Paul Brown; Drive-In with Shaw Taylor (1973–78) and its successor Wheels (1980–81); Miss Thames Television; 1776, a ITV programme on the US bicentenary; and the award-winning historical series English Garden, narrated by Sir John Gielgud. For nine years Bastable presented the consumer protection series Money-Go-Round, and also presented shows such as Mind Over Matter, a programme he devised with Kit Pedler that investigated the paranormal, and the computing series Database as well as 4 Computer Buffs. In addition, he was a panellist on radio shows and he narrated the Channel 4 nature programme Profiles Of Nature.

== Later life ==
Bastable later moved into independent production, and he presented training and promotional films for companies such as the Ford Motor Company, the National Bus Company, the Royal Navy, the Department of Transport and the Institute of Advanced Motorists. He also wrote mini-history books for children on the 15th and 16th-century nautical explorers John Cabot and Ferdinand Magellan.

== Personal life ==
Bastable was a qualified cricket umpire and founded the Institute of Cricket Umpires and Scorers. In 1972 he founded The Magpies, a wandering cricket team taking its name from the TV programme.

He married three times. His first marriage was in 1969 to June Buchan, from whom he was divorced in 1971. In 1974, he married Jackie Colkett. They had a daughter, but divorced in 1992. He married for the third time, to Anita Westwood, in 2001.

== Death ==
Bastable suffered from emphysema in his final years, and died at the age of 62 from pneumonia at the East Surrey Hospital, Redhill, in Surrey on 29 May 2007.

== Publications ==
- John Cabot (Pub. World Almanac Library, 2003).
- Ferdinand Magellan (Pub. World Almanac Library, 2003).
