= Robin Ray =

English broadcaster (1934–1998)

- Born: Robin Olden; 17 September 1934; Fulham, London, England
- Died: 29 November 1998 (aged 64); Hove, East Sussex, England
- Occupations: Broadcaster, actor, musician
- Years active: 1956–1997
- Spouse: Susan Stranks (m. 1960–1998)
- Parent: Ted Ray
- Family: Andrew Ray (brother)

Robin Ray (17 September 1934 – 29 November 1998) was an English broadcaster on radio and television, actor of stage and screen, and musician. The eldest son of the comedian Ted Ray, he was educated at the Royal Academy of Dramatic Art and was the school's chief technical instructor from 1961 to 1965.

Ray was the first chairman of the BBC Television panel programme Call My Bluff in the 1960s, and regularly appeared on the BBC 2 evening quiz show Face the Music in the 1970s. He was the author of plays and books and was the music adviser to Classic FM between 1988 and 1997, and artistic director for Performance Channel TV from 1996 to 1997.

== Early life ==
Born Robin Olden in Fulham, London on 17 September 1934, he was the eldest son of Charles Olden, later known as the comedian Ted Ray, and the dancer Dorothy Sybil Stevens. His younger brother, Andrew, also became an actor. At age 10, Ray received records of Franz Schubert's Unfinished Symphony and Ludwig van Beethoven's Piano Sonata No. 14 from his father and briefly harboured aspirations of becoming a classical conductor.

From the age of 15, he also wanted to become a concert pianist after an unsuccessful venture with the violin until he realised his lack of skill. Ray was taught at Highgate School in North London and decided to enrol at the Royal Academy of Dramatic Art (RADA) after his brother began working as an actor. He did his national service in the Royal Army Service Corps and rose to the rank of second lieutenant.

== Career ==
Ray performed one stand-up comedy routine at a West End club at the age of 21 but was unsuccessful. In January 1956, Ray made his television debut as the youngest member of a gang in the ITV crime play The Guv'nor, and performed in a Bob and Alf Pearson summer show in Bournemouth. He first appeared as a professional actor in a West End production of The Changeling at the Royal Court Theatre in 1960, just after graduating from RADA with a diploma in acting. Ray was understudy to Dudley Moore in Beyond the Fringe, replacing Moore when the original cast went to the United States. He played small roles in the films I'm All Right Jack (1959) as a Young Chemist, a doctor in Doctor in Love (1960), a Flag Lieutenant in Watch Your Stern (1960), a seaman in Sink the Bismarck! (1960), an assistant manager in Carry On Constable (1960) and a TV floor manager in A Hard Day's Night (1964).

Ray was the chief technical instructor at RADA from 1961 until his resignation in 1965, in support of the resignation of the principal John Fernald due to internal politics at the school. The decision allowed Ray to return to broadcasting, and he was broadcaster or writer of more than 1,000 programmes for the BBC and commercial radio and television between 1966 and 1995. He went on to serve as associate director of the Meadow Brook Theater in Detroit, United States from 1965 to 1966. Ray was a cast member of the 1963 BBC Television series Dig This Rhubarb. Two years later, he was selected to be the first chairman of the new BBC panel show Call My Bluff, and created the programme The Daring Young Men on the Black and White Keys on virtuoso pianists the following year.

Ray acted as the compere of the 1968 Associated-Rediffusion series Where Did That Come From? in which contestants were required to make a derivation of quotes or words. He was the presenter of the 1968 television film Crazy World, Crazy People. He was the host of one series of the BBC 2 programme Music Now from 1969 to 1970. He was a regular panel member on the BBC 2 evening music quiz, Face the Music, which began in 1972. On radio, Ray presented Sounds Funny in 1972 in which celebrities spoke about things that amused them as well as The Year in Question in 1973. From 1979 to 1981, he was the presenter of the BBC Radio 4 series A Touch of Genius in which he reviewed notable musicians around the world.

He presented quiz shows such as The Movie Quiz from 1972 to 1974 (he spent the final series as a team captain after deciding to give the presenting duties to Michael Aspel), and Film Buff of the Year about films from the silent era to the present day, which ran from 1982 to 1986. From 1976 to 1978, Ray was the compere of the Saturday night BBC 2 arts documentary series The Lively Arts about composers, musicians, performers and writers. He was the presenter of the BBC 2 television series Robin Ray's Picture Gallery in 1979, comparing the treatment of various figures by the film industry with biographical information. Between 1980 and 1982, Ray was chairman of the Granada history quiz show Cabbages and Kings.

The children's television programme Sounds Exciting, broadcast in 1968, was a musical education series culminating in a final "whodunit" called Dead in Tune, with Ray's original story set to the music of Herbert Chappell performed by a chamber group of players from the Leicestershire Schools Symphony Orchestra (LSSO). Two years later, Argo recorded the piece using an ensemble of 47 LSSO players conducted by Chappell. This LP also included a new commission, George and the Dragonfly, with John Kershaw's words set to the music of Chappell and narrated by Ray, John Kershaw and Susan Stranks (Ray's wife).

From 1974 he presented a programme called Robin Ray's Record Review on Capital Radio in London. Ray had a role in the 1977 production of the musical Side by Side by Sondheim at the Garrick Theatre and presented Tomfoolery based on the songs of Tom Lehrer at the Criterion Theatre in London in 1980. At the age of 45, he wrote the musical Cafe Puccini based on the life of the opera composer Giacomo Puccini with Andrew Lloyd Webber, which opened at the Wyndham's Theatre in 1986 with musical director William Blezard. Ray was the author of several books. This included the anthology Time for Lovers (1975), Robin Ray's Music Quiz (1978), Favourite Hymns and Carols (1982), Words on Music (1984), and was a consultant editor of Classic FM Music Guide to Classical Music (1996).

He was a panellist for the Booker Prize in 1977, and was the drama critic for Punch magazine between 1986 and 1987. Ray co-wrote and narrated the songs of the Let's Do It show that was complied by David Kernan from the music of Noël Coward and Cole Porter at the Chichester Festival in 1994. He was the artistic director of Performance Channel TV between 1996 and 1997 and was a consultant for Nimbus Records in 1998. He was employed as a music adviser to Classic FM Radio from 1988 until his resignation in 1997. He drew up a list of 50,000 pieces of classical music and rated them for popular appeal, which was the basis for the Classic FM playlist. This list proved to be extremely attractive to similar popular classical music radio stations in other countries, and there was a legal dispute between Ray and Classic FM, which Ray won in 1998, as to who was entitled to the copyright in the playlist and ratings.

== Personal life and death ==
He became engaged to the actress and children's television presenter Susan Stranks in August 1958, and they married at St. Gabriel's Church in Warwick Square, Westminster on 25 January 1960. Early in their careers, they decided they did not want to have children, but later they changed their minds, and had a son, Rupert, when Ray was 44. Ray died of lung cancer in Hove, on 29 November 1998. He was cremated privately on 3 December.
