= Bitsy =

Bitsy or Bitsie may refer to:

== Nickname ==
- Bryan Grant (1909–1986), American tennis player
- Bitsy Mott (1918–2001), American Major League Baseball backup infielder, later personal security manager of Elvis Presley
- Elizabeth Tulloch (born 1981), American actress nicknamed "Bitsie"

== Fictional characters ==
- Bitsy Brandenham, a major character in the TV series Central Park
- Bitsy Davidson, an occasional character on the soap opera All My Children
- Bitsy Mae Harling, a major character in the 2008 TV series Sordid Lives: The Series
- Bitsy Johnson, a character in the TV series Ned's Declassified School Survival Guide
- Bitsy von Muffling, an occasional character in the TV series Sex and the City
- Bitsy, one of the four protagonists in SuperKitties
- Bitsy, a hand puppet spider in the British children's programme Paperplay
- Bitsy, a family dog in the comic strip Marvin
