= Freetime (TV series) =

Children's television programme

- Genre: Children's; Entertainment
- Presented by: Mick Robertson; Trudy Dance; Kim Goody
- Country of origin: United Kingdom
- Original language: English
- No. of series: 11

Production
- Running time: 25 minutes

Original release
- Network: ITV (CITV)
- Release: 8 December 1980 – 23 December 1988

Freetime was a children's television programme shown on ITV. Its premiere episode debuted on 8 December 1980 and was listed as "Free Time" in the TV Times. But the series did not properly start until 17 April 1981. Produced by Thames Television, it was a magazine format show devoted to hobbies and interests, and was designed to encourage viewers to get out and about rather than staying at home and watching television. It was hosted by the former Magpie presenter Mick Robertson.

Robertson was initially joined on set by Trudi Dance, but she was soon replaced by Kim Goody, who co-presented the show with Robertson until it was axed by the network in 1985, at which time the show was being broadcast bi-weekly. The object of the show was to shed light on the manifold hobbies and interests that viewers might wish to pursue. However, not all of these were really possible. One famous show from the final season featured two teams of dogs playing football, with Robertson providing commentary, while Goody attempted to act as referee.

Following the show's finale, Robertson went on to help launch The Children's Channel, and was briefly reunited with Goody a few years later when she joined him as a presenter on his show, Roustabout. However, after a year or so, she left to pursue a career in music.

On 16 September 1988, Thames Television briefly re-launched Freetime, this time fronted by Andi Peters, but the series was cancelled after its fifteenth and final edition on 23 December 1988
