= Hampstead (film) =

- Theatrical release poster
- Directed by: Joel Hopkins
- Written by: Robert Festinger
- Produced by: Robert Bernstein; Douglas Rae
- Starring: Diane Keaton; Brendan Gleeson; Lesley Manville; Jason Watkins; James Norton; Phil Davis
- Cinematography: Felix Wiedemann
- Edited by: Robin Sales
- Music by: Stephen Warbeck
- Production companies: Ecosse Films; Scope Pictures
- Distributed by: eOne
- Release date: 23 June 2017
- Running time: 103 minutes
- Countries: United Kingdom; Belgium; Canada
- Language: English
- Box office: $6.2 million

Hampstead is a 2017 comedy-drama film directed by Joel Hopkins and written by Robert Festinger. It is based on the life of Harry Hallowes who successfully claimed ownership of a half-acre plot of Hampstead Heath. The film stars Diane Keaton, Brendan Gleeson, James Norton, Lesley Manville, Jason Watkins, Hugh Skinner, and Simon Callow.

Hampstead was released in the United Kingdom by eOne on 23 June 2017.

== Cast ==
- Diane Keaton as Emily Walters
- Brendan Gleeson as Donald Horner
- James Norton as Philip
- Lesley Manville as Fiona
- Jason Watkins as James Smythe
- Phil Davis as Fyfe
- Simon Callow as The Judge
- Alistair Petrie as Steve Crowley
- Peter Singh as Xavier
- Will Smith as Leon Rowlands
- Rosalind Ayres as Susan
- Brian Protheroe as Rory
- Alex Gaumond as Mark Kasdan
- Hugh Skinner as Erik

== Production ==
The story is based upon the real life events surrounding Harry Hallowes who first squatted on the site in 1987 after being evicted from his council flat in Highgate. Hallowes, who died aged 80 in 2016, battled for the legal rights to own the land on which he had built his shelter arguing that he had gained ownership by adverse possession. He was eventually awarded title to 7,000 square feet (650 m^{2}).

On 20 October 2015 Diane Keaton and Brendan Gleeson joined the cast of the film. On 13 May 2016 Lesley Manville, James Norton, Jason Watkins, and Simon Callow joined the cast of the film. Principal photography began on 22 May 2016.

== Release ==
The film was released on 23 June 2017 by Entertainment One Films.

In February 2017, The Weinstein Company acquired the North American distribution rights with the studio planning a theatrical release sometime in 2017. However due to the Harvey Weinstein scandal, the film's rights were later bought back by its producers from Lantern Entertainment which acquired TWC's assets in May 2018. It was released theatrically on June 14, 2019 by IFC Films in the United States.

== Reception ==
On review aggregator Rotten Tomatoes, the film holds an approval rating of 43% based on 60 reviews, with an average rating of 5.01/10. The website's critics consensus reads: "Hampstead plays matchmaker with a pair of talented veterans, but the sum of their efforts isn't enough to overcome a deeply mediocre story." On Metacritic, the film has a weighted average score of 53 out of 100, based on 10 critics, indicating "mixed or average reviews".
