= Douglas Rae (producer) =

Scottish film producer and television producer and executive

Douglas Rae (born 22 June 1947) is a Scottish film producer, television producer and a former children's television presenter.

Rae presented the long-running Thames Television children's series Magpie, taking over from Pete Brady in 1971 and remaining until 1977.

Rae then moved behind the camera, becoming an executive producer of films and television series. In November 1988 he founded Ecosse Films, a film and television production company. Film productions include Mrs Brown starring Judi Dench, Charlotte Gray starring Cate Blanchett, Becoming Jane starring Anne Hathaway and James McAvoy, and the BAFTA-nominated Nowhere Boy.

Ecosse Films' most successful television production has been the BBC serial Monarch of the Glen. Other television productions include the BBC One series Mistresses (2008–2010), Camelot (2011), Fleming: The Man Who Would Be Bond (2014), The Great Fire (2014), the Bloomsbury Group drama Life in Squares (2015), and The Trial of Christine Keeler (2019). His most recent production is the film The Great Escaper, starring Michael Caine and Glenda Jackson.
