= Harry Hallowes =

Irishman who became famous for living on Hampstead Heath

- Born: c. 1936
- Died: 2016 (aged 79–80); London, England

Harry Hallowes (born c. 1936, died 2016), also known as Harry the Hermit, was an Irishman who became famous for living in a camp on Hampstead Heath in north London. When property developers tried to evict him, he successfully claimed adverse possession. After his death, a romantic comedy called Hampstead was made about his life.

== Life ==
Hallowes was born in County Sligo, Ireland, around 1936 and moved to London in the 1950s. He was evicted from his council flat in Highgate in 1987 and then set up a makeshift camp in a corner of Hampstead Heath near Athlone House, supporting himself by doing odd jobs for locals such as the director Terry Gilliam. When property developers tried to evict him, he successfully claimed title to the land by adverse possession having lived there for over 12 years. He was awarded title to the half-acre plot of land in 2007.

== Death ==
Hallowes died in February 2016. Hallowes left the half-acre plot to two homelessness charities (Shelter and Centrepoint) and following his death the land was auctioned. The plot sold for £154,000 which was significantly less than estimates that had been speculatively reported in the press. This was due to an agreement that is over 100 years old which prevents construction on the site.

== Film ==
In 2017, a romantic comedy called Hampstead was based on Hallowes' experience. In the film, actor Brendan Gleeson played the part of a hermit on Hampstead Heath, who is befriended by an American widow played by Diane Keaton.
