= The Great Fire (TV series) =

- Genre: Drama
- Written by: Tom Bradby
- Directed by: Jon Jones
- Starring: Andrew Buchan; Rose Leslie; Jack Huston; Daniel Mays; Perdita Weeks; Oliver Jackson-Cohen; Charles Dance; Nicholas Blane; Andrew Tiernan
- Composers: Dan Jones; Elizabeth Purnell
- Country of origin: United Kingdom
- Original language: English
- No. of series: 1
- No. of episodes: 4

Production
- Executive producers: Lucy Bedford; Douglas Rae
- Producer: Gina Cronk
- Running time: 50 minutes (inc adverts)
- Production company: Ecosse Films

Original release
- Network: ITV
- Release: 16 October – 6 November 2014

The Great Fire is a four-part television drama first shown on ITV from 16 October to 6 November 2014. It is set during the Great Fire of London in England in 1666. It was written by Tom Bradby and produced by Ecosse Films. Each hour-long (including commercial breaks) episode is set in one day of the fire.

== Plot ==
The series portrays events from the points of view of the Farriner family, in whose bakery on Pudding Lane the fire started, and of the royal court in responding to the fire.

The storyline adds depictions never recorded from the real event. The fire was shown as starting when Farriner's daughter left the oven's stoke-hatch open and its fire ejected a hot ember which ignited loose straw on the wooden floor. It suggests Farriner had a contract to supply baked goods to the Royal Navy and was suffering financial difficulties as a result of their persistently delaying payment. It also follows a sub-plot in which there is a suspected Catholic plot to kill King Charles II, in which the Farriners become suspected of complicity.

== Cast ==
- Andrew Buchan as Thomas Farriner
- Rose Leslie as Sarah, Thomas Farriner's (fictional) sister-in-law
- Jack Huston as King Charles II of England
- Daniel Mays as Samuel Pepys
- Perdita Weeks as Elizabeth Pepys, Samuel's wife
- Oliver Jackson-Cohen as James, Duke of York (the King's brother, the future King James II of England)
- Charles Dance as Lord Denton, the King's (fictional) spymaster
- Nicholas Blane as Thomas Bloodworth, Lord Mayor of London
- Andrew Tiernan as Vincent, a prisoner in Newgate Prison
- Antonia Clarke as Frances Stewart, Duchess of Richmond
- Uriel Emil as Signor Romero
- Sonya Cassidy as Catherine of Braganza

== Filming locations ==
Cobham Hall was used to film some of the London street scenes and Penshurst Place in Kent doubled as the exterior of the King's palace.

== Reception ==
The Guardian was moderately positive, describing it as, 'decent enough drama, if not quite as great as its title would like it to be, and it is lifted by a fine cast, particularly Charles Dance as the sinister intelligence officer Lord Denton.' The Independent also praised the cast, but said the series lacked suspense. The Telegraph gave it two stars.
