= Performance Channel =

Former British arts and entertainment television channel (1985–2008)

Ownership
- Owner: Eicom
- Sister channels: Performance MainStreet

History
- Launched: 1992
- Closed: 1 July 2008

Links
- Website: performance-channel.com

Performance Channel was an arts and entertainment television channel that broadcast in the United Kingdom. The Performance Channel launched as an evening cable-only service in 1992. The channel started broadcasting on Sky Digital in 2003 and its broadcast hours expanded. The channel was dropped from cable networks shortly afterwards.

== Programming ==
The channel broadcast concerts, performances, master classes and star profiles from noted composers and musicians. Music featured included jazz and easy listening, as well as opera and classical. The channel also featured dance performances as well as interviews with noted actors and performers.

Performance Channel tended to offer more high culture in its schedules, rather than its sister channel Performance MainStreet which concentrated more on rock and pop music programming.

== History ==
Daily Mail & General Trust (DMGT) bought the Performance Channel in 1994 and sold it to Eicom in 2005.

In 2007 Performance launched a sister channel, Performance Main Street, which focussed mainly on classic and contemporary rock music, a genre which had not been part of the main channel's output.

The Performance Channel was closed down at 6.00am on 1 July 2008 after nearly 16 years of broadcasting.

As of 1 July 2008, some of the Performance Channel programmes had moved to Performance MainStreet, until it closed down on 10 September 2008 and was replaced with Rock On TV on 1 October 2008.
