= Camelot (TV series) =

Historical-fantasy-drama television series

- Genre: Historical drama; Sword and sorcery
- Created by: Michael Hirst; Chris Chibnall
- Starring: Joseph Fiennes; Jamie Campbell Bower; Tamsin Egerton; Claire Forlani; Peter Mooney; Philip Winchester; Eva Green; Chipo Chung; Clive Standen; Sinéad Cusack
- Composers: Mychael Danna; Jeff Danna
- Countries of origin: Ireland; Canada
- Original language: English
- No. of seasons: 1
- No. of episodes: 10

Production
- Executive producers: Morgan O'Sullivan; Douglas Rae; Graham King; Tim Headington; Craig Cegielski; Anne Thomopoulos; James Flynn; John Weber; Fred Fuchs; Michael Hirst; Chris Chibnall
- Production locations: County Wicklow, Ireland
- Cinematography: Joel Ransom
- Editors: Sidney Wolinsky; Stephen O'Connell; Teresa De Luca; Michele Conroy; Wendy Hallam Martin
- Running time: 47–51 minutes
- Production companies: KA Television Productions; Take 5 Productions; Octagon Films; Ecosse Films; GK-TV; Starz Entertainment

Original release
- Network: Starz
- Release: 25 February – 10 June 2011

Camelot is a fantasy historical drama television series created by Michael Hirst and Chris Chibnall for Starz. An Irish-Canadian co-production, the series is based on the Arthurian legend, and stars an ensemble cast led by Joseph Fiennes, Jamie Campbell Bower, and Eva Green.

Camelot premiered on Starz in the United States on 25 February 2011, with a special full-length preview showing of the pilot episode. It then formally premiered on 1 April 2011, and concluded on 10 June 2011, after ten episodes. The series debuted to strong ratings and subsequently earned a Primetime Emmy Award for Outstanding Original Main Title Theme Music nomination. On 30 June 2011, Starz announced it was not going to order additional episodes of Camelot, citing scheduling conflicts with some members of the cast, including Fiennes, Campbell Bower and Green, as the main reason.

== Plot ==
It is the late 5th century and Britain has been free of Roman rule for several decades. With King Uther's sudden death chaos threatens to engulf Britain. The sorcerer Merlin has visions of a dark future and installs the young and impetuous Arthur, Uther's unknown son and heir who has been raised as a commoner, as the new king. Merlin and Arthur install themselves in Castle Camelot with their allies, which include Arthur's biological mother Igraine, his foster brother Kay and loyal warriors Leontes, Gawain, Ulfius and Brastias. From Camelot, Arthur tries to build a new and better Britain, where people can live in peace.

Meanwhile, Arthur's cold and ambitious half-sister, Morgan plots to take the crown from him. Banished by her father, King Uther, who was responsible for her mother's murder to put Arthur's mother on the throne, Morgan is responsible for Uther's death and wants to rule as his successor. Aided by her loyal maid, Vivian and the devious nun, Sybil, Morgan takes up residence in Uther's old castle, Castle Pendragon, from where she schemes against Arthur.

== Cast and characters ==
=== Main ===
- Joseph Fiennes as Merlin – the creator and custodian of the legend of Camelot. As Arthur's greatest and most powerful ally, Merlin believes in him even more than Arthur believes in himself. He can foresee the threats to Arthur more clearly than anyone, but he must fight the dark nature of his power and harness it to bring forth a new Camelot.
- Jamie Campbell Bower as King Arthur – a handsome, carefree young man. He is torn from his home and family upon learning he is the only male heir to the throne as a result of the king's untimely death. Arthur's intense education in a dark, unruly world inspires him to pursue a kingdom based on justice, hope, and freedom from tyranny while the lands he oversees are corrupted by violence, greed, and despair.
- Eva Green as Morgan Pendragon – the beautiful and ruthlessly ambitious daughter of King Uther. She wishes to claim her right to her father's throne, but she does not count on Merlin's plans or the existence of Arthur, her newly revealed half-brother. In her pursuit of power and revenge, Morgan gives herself over to dark forces that allow her to threaten the court of Camelot from within. She functions as the main antagonist of the series.
- Tamsin Egerton as Guinevere – an ambitious and strong willed woman, making her a source of great support and strength to Arthur as he grows into his role as king. Although she is married to Leontes, one of Arthur's most loyal knights, she cannot deny the attraction she and Arthur feel for each other.
- Claire Forlani as Igraine – Arthur's biological mother and second wife of King Uther. She is estranged from her son and despised by her step-daughter Morgan. She has lived a life of deep pain and agony, but has never lost her faith or her heart. Igraine quickly becomes an ally and figure of strength for Arthur and the entire court of Camelot.
- Chipo Chung as Vivian – a young woman who is descended from a people brought to Britain as slaves. She served as an indentured servant at Uther's court and now works as an attendant and messenger for Morgan.
- Sinéad Cusack as Sybil – a nun who has raised Morgan and comes to live with her. She is a motherly figure for Morgan, acting as her advisor in matters both political and supernatural. She takes the blame for Morgan's treason, and is beheaded by Gawain.
- Peter Mooney as Kay – Arthur's fiercely loyal older brother. Kay encourages Arthur to take up his destiny as King of Britain. As the king's Marshal, Kay has the freedom to become his own man, but will always remain Arthur's older brother and closest friend.
- Clive Standen as Gawain – a former knight and great warrior. He has become disillusioned and lost his way in life. Kay and Leontes recruit him to join the court of Camelot. He eventually comes to Camelot and realizes Arthur is different and not just another warlord. Inspired, he finds reason to fight and train Arthur's men.
- Philip Winchester as Leontes – one of King Uther's bravest knights. Leontes pledges his loyalty to the new king after Uther's death and joins Arthur in Camelot. Married to Guinevere, his loyalty and experience are invaluable to the young king as he attempts to secure order in a land beset by violence and threats from rivals to the throne.

=== Recurring ===
- Sebastian Koch as King Uther, Arthur's biological father who was poisoned and killed by Morgan.
- James Purefoy as King Lot, a warrior-king who forms an alliance with Morgan.
- Diarmaid Murtagh as Brastias, a knight of King Arthur.
- Jamie Downey as Ulfius, a knight of King Arthur, who is killed during the battle at Bardon Pass.
- Daragh O'Malley as Leodegrance, Guinevere's father.
- Sean Pertwee as Sir Ector, Arthur's foster father and Kay's father.
- Lara Jean Chorostecki as Bridget, Guinevere's cousin.

== Episodes ==
| No. | Title | Directed by | Written by | Original release date | US viewers (millions) |
|---|---|---|---|---|---|
| 1 | "Homecoming" | Ciarán Donnelly | Story by : Michael Hirst & Chris Chibnall; Teleplay by : Chris Chibnall | 25 February 2011 | 1.13 (Note: Ratings for the "Sneak Preview" on 25 February 2011 are not available, so ratings for the official premiere on 1 April 2011 are listed instead.) |
Using magic to disguise herself as a servant girl, sorceress Morgan kills her father, King Uther Pendragon, who cheated on her mother and sent her away for fifteen years. Morgan also banishes Uther's wife, Igraine, and invites her father's most powerful enemy, King Lot, to Castle Pendragon to formalise an alliance. Merlin, Uther's most trusted adviser, finds Arthur, a young man, and tells him he is the new king. Arthur has trouble believing he is of royal blood, but his adoptive parents confirm this. Years before, Uther had an affair with an enemy's queen, Igraine, and it was Merlin who arranged the tryst. Merlin convinces Arthur to accompany him to the abandoned fortress of Camelot. Arthur's adoptive brother, Kay, joins them. At Uther's palace, Morgan hears of the "new king". She, along with King Lot, shows up at Camelot and announces herself to be the only legitimate heir. There, Igraine confirms it is true. Arthur, however, refuses to give up his throne. This angers Morgan. In order to demonstrate his power, Lot has Arthur's foster mother killed in front of him.
| 2 | "The Sword and the Crown" | Ciarán Donnelly | Chris Chibnall | 1 April 2011 | 1.13 |
Arthur meets Guinevere, the woman of his dreams. Morgana and King Lot conspire to attack Camelot and take the throne. Lot mortally wounds Arthur's foster father, who gets his revenge by stabbing Lot to death before dying. Merlin has Arthur reclaim the legacy sword in the stone, known here as the sword of Mars, to prove his worthiness as king. It is hinted at that Merlin has rigged the contest in advance so that only one who first pushes the sword in can then pull it out, while he suggests to Arthur that this is how to retrieve the sword. Merlin uses Arthur's success as propaganda to inspire loyalty to Arthur.
| 3 | "Guinevere" | Jeremy Podeswa | Story by : Chris Chibnall & Louise Fox; Teleplay by : Louise Fox | 8 April 2011 | 0.854 |
Guinevere's home is ransacked just before her wedding. She flees to Camelot to be protected by her husband-to-be, Leontes. Kay and Leontes seek out a trusted new warrior to join them. Arthur and Merlin accept an invitation to join Morgan at her castle for dinner. Arthur then meets up with Guinevere and they struggle with their relationship as she readies for her marriage to Leontes. Arthur has sex with Guinevere on the morning of her wedding to Leontes. Merlin suspects Arthur's infatuation with Guinevere. Arthur is forced to concede defeat in his pursuit of her.
| 4 | "Lady of the Lake" | Jeremy Podeswa | Louise Fox & Chris Chibnall | 15 April 2011 | 0.988 |
Merlin visits legendary sword-maker Caliburn, giving him details about Arthur's physique and fighting style to ensure that a sword suited to him is created. After the sword is crafted, Merlin accidentally kills Caliburn. His daughter, Excalibur, rows out to the middle of a lake into which she plans to throw the sword as revenge. Merlin casts a spell causing the surface of the water to freeze and walks out to her. Losing her balance, Excalibur falls into the lake and drowns as the ice forms above her. Trying to save herself, she uses the sword to punch a hole through the ice, her hand emerging from the lake clutching it. Merlin takes the sword from her hand, but cannot break through the ice layer to save her. Merlin lies to Arthur about how he obtained the sword, which he names Excalibur in honour of Caliburn's daughter. Merlin's deceptive account resembles the traditional Arthurian legend of "Lady of the Lake". A conversation with Guinevere changes Arthur, who begins to assert his power by sparring with Leontes. Frustrated that he cannot be with Guinevere, Arthur neglects his duties towards his warriors.
| 5 | "Justice" | Stefan Schwartz | Sarah Phelps & Terry Cafolla | 29 April 2011 | 0.985 |
Arthur intervenes in a murder investigation convinced that the killer may have had an honourable motive. Arthur tries to establish the rule of law and begins a trial. Morgan tries to cultivate political favour by promoting herself as a champion of justice while framing a local mercenary for the beating of Sybil, the nun who raised her. Morgan then slits the mercenary's throat in front of her followers.
| 6 | "Three Journeys" | Stefan Schwartz | Chris Chibnall | 6 May 2011 | 0.730 |
This episode interweaves three stories: Guinevere's journey to her parents' home where her father is dying, accompanied by Arthur; Kay's journey (at the behest of Merlin) to his deceased father's home to retrieve his library; and a woman who comes to Morgan for justice claiming that Sybil caused the death of her daughter as result of deliberately setting fire to the convent. Morgan decides to punish Sybil for her negligence by burning her hand in order to maintain an impression of impartial justice, but dismisses the allegations of witchcraft against her mentor, both because Sybil's magic is benign and to cover her own dark powers.
| 7 | "The Long Night" | Mikael Salomon | Steven Lightfoot | 13 May 2011 | 0.845 |
Morgan invites Arthur and his regiment of soldiers over for an evening's entertainment and an overnight stay. During this time, she sets up a series of intrigues and hoaxes which include a faked attack on the castle, which many believe is by a former rival of Uther. Morgan eventually shape-shifts to look like Igraine and rides back to Camelot with Arthur. Meanwhile, Igraine is manacled in a dungeon.
| 8 | "Igraine" | Michelle MacLaren | Story by : Chris Chibnall & Louise Fox; Teleplay by : Chris Chibnall & Steven Lightfoot | 20 May 2011 | 0.712 |
Igraine is held prisoner at Castle Pendragon while Morgan, magically disguised as Igraine, roams the halls of Camelot plotting intrigue. As Igraine, she reveals to Leontes that Arthur had a tryst with Guinevere in the morning before their wedding and has sex with Merlin. She is also approached by an orphan Redwald, who clearly knows and loves Igraine. That night the spell starts wearing off, and Redwald sees her face change briefly. Trying to stop him getting help, Morgan accidentally causes him to fall off a wall and die. The next day Merlin sees his clothes are ripped and realises someone knows what happened. The real Igraine eventually escapes from Castle Pendragon after killing a guard who raped her in exchange for her release, and travels back to Camelot only to run into a still disguised Morgan.
| 9 | "The Battle of Bardon Pass" | Mikael Salomon | Louise Fox & Chris Chibnall | 3 June 2011 | 1.00 |
Morgan convinces Igraine that she is just hallucinating and escapes Camelot now in her own form. When Merlin and Igraine confront Morgan at Castle Pendragon about this, she and her followers arrest them. She then anonymously stages a raid at Bardon Pass, hoping that Arthur will be inadequate to stop it, positioning her to become acknowledged as the better ruler of Camelot, where she proceeds to travel with her new prisoners, Merlin and Igraine. Leontes confronts Guinevere about her relationship to Arthur, and then confronts Arthur about it. During the battle, Kay is shot by an arrow, becoming in desperate need of medical attention. Arthur and his friends realize that the only way that they will succeed is if one of them stays behind. Arthur volunteers and prepares for a battle to the death with Morgan's army while his friends leave.
| 10 | "Reckoning" | Mikael Salomon; Stefan Schwartz | Terry Cafolla & Chris Chibnall | 10 June 2011 | 1.03 |
Morgan's plan to overthrow Arthur is exposed. Leontes dies protecting Arthur at Bardon Pass, and tells him to treasure Guinevere. Morgan claims Arthur has died, after which Sybil says she should be Queen, which the people agree with. Morgan stabs Igraine, claiming she got her banished, though Igraine reveals she sent her away as Uther wanted to kill her. Arthur returns at her coronation and reveals one of her men, who confesses she was behind it. However, Sybil takes credit for Morgan's treasonous schemes, claiming she planned everything and Morgan knew nothing about it. Igraine dies in a tearful Merlin's arms. Sybil is executed, and while the public accepts this story, Arthur and Merlin are not deceived. Arthur strips Morgan of the name and banner of Pendragon and says her castle is no longer protected. Morgan visits Sybil's grave and, upon hearing a voice telling her to bear a child, disguises herself as Guinevere and has sex with Arthur.

== Production ==
In October 2010, Camelot was the first series to get the green light from Starz since Chris Albrecht took over as president and CEO of the company. With the announcement of plans for the series, Albrecht said that "The story of Arthur isn't history, it's mythology, and Camelot isn't a place but an idea of hope that has resonated at different times throughout history." The series was also the first project for GK-TV, a television division of GK Films (headed by Academy Award-winning producer Graham King and producer Timothy Headington) launched in January 2010. King called the series "a perfect choice as GK-TV's maiden project," given the company's mandate for "producing compelling cinematic quality programming for television." The series idea is attributed to the U.K.'s Ecosse Films, and an "early incarnation" was set up at Showtime in 2008, with that network announcing plans for the series in conjunction with BBC.

Chris Chibnall, known for writing episodes for Life on Mars (2006–2007) and Torchwood (2006–2008), and former showrunner of Law & Order: UK (2009), was selected to become the showrunner and head writer on the show. Chibnall was no newcomer to the legend of Camelot, having previously been in charge of developing a series about Merlin in 2005 for BBC. However, despite several scripts being written, BBC Head of Drama Jane Tranter eventually decided not to green-light the project, although it later emerged, without Chibnall's involvement, as Merlin (2008–2012).

Chibnall stated that every era needs its own version of the story of Camelot and that this version would include strong currents of politics and romance in an adult drama: "The amazing thing about Camelot is you can talk about political pursuits and it's all about the romance. It's all about the passion. It's all about great ideals compromised by falling in love with the wrong person." Chibnall also stated that the story had a special relevance for today's world because it dealt with the promise of world leaders to create a better world, and then trying to carry through on their promises.

The series was engineered by executive producers Morgan O'Sullivan of Octagon in Ireland and John Weber of Take 5 Productions in Canada. O'Sullivan had experience with the story through his involvement with the 2004 film King Arthur. Other executive producers included Graham King and Timothy Headington of GK Films, Craig Cegielski of GK-TV, James Flynn of Octagon, Douglas Rae of UK's Ecosse Films, Fred Fuchs, Michael Hirst and Anne Thomopoulos.

The cast assembled at Ardmore Studios in Ireland in June–July 2010 to begin principal photography for the series, which was created as an Irish-Canadian international co-production. After the Ireland filming, post-production and visual effects took place in Toronto, Ontario, Canada. The cost was estimated at $7 million per episode. Starz retained U.S. rights, including digital and home entertainment distribution, Take 5 Productions owned distribution rights in Canada, and GK-TV for the rest of the world. The series aired on Channel 4 in the UK, RTÉ in Ireland, CBC in Canada, Nine Network in Australia, RTL in The Netherlands, and VIER in Belgium.

The series used well-known stories and legends about King Arthur, including Le Morte d'Arthur "but those only provided a starting point". The goal of the producers was to create episodes that "weave historical authenticity into a telling of the Arthur legends that is relatable to contemporary audiences". The relationship between Merlin (Joseph Fiennes) and Arthur (Jamie Campbell Bower) was central to the show. Fiennes has joked that he thinks "of Merlin as a sort of cross between Obi-Wan Kenobi and Donald Rumsfeld," referring to Kenobi's mentoring qualities and Rumsfeld's political agendas. Fiennes described Merlin as a "...sort of tutor. He's a father figure. He's a brutal headmaster. He's got to give this boy all of the tools to be king in a ruthless world, and he has to do it in a very short space of time. So there's a lot of 'cruel to be kind.'"

While the first season was limited to ten episodes, the producers indicated that if the response to the show were strong, they had plans for "several additional seasons". It was announced on 30 June 2011, that Camelot would not be returning for a second season and US network Starz had ruled out production for 2011.

== Promotion ==
Promotional poster, showing Jamie Campbell Bower as Arthur and Eva Green as Morgan

Publicity releases noted the series would consist of ten episodes that would "redefine the classic medieval tale of King Arthur." Advance descriptions of the series described it as having "sex, sword-fighting, magic, comedy". According to a tongue-in-cheek comment by Joseph Fiennes, it should be watched for another reason: "Because it's not a musical [in reference to the musical Camelot, its 873 performances, and its subsequent productions]."

Starz invested in a number of initiatives to promote the series, including the advance airing of the first episode (scheduled for normal broadcast on 1 April 2011) on 25 February 2011, following the series finale of that network's successful series, Spartacus: Gods of the Arena. That episode, "Homecoming", was subsequently posted on the special series website created by Starz, where it could be streamed for home viewing.

In addition to a meeting with film critics to talk about the show, individual interviews with the writer and a number of cast members have been conducted, a Facebook page has been created, and many of the stars have been blogging and tweeting about the show's progress during and after the filming. Additionally, special short video trailers and behind-the-scenes video teasers were also posted online. The upcoming series was also advertised online in a "Starz Originals" video, promoting both current and future original series.

Starz also released a poster showing Arthur and Morgan and a series of promotional photos. In addition to the official promotions, fans created a website to include news and images of the upcoming series.

== Reception ==
Advance publicity for the series was positive, as evidenced by the comments of Maureen Ryan, who writes the "Stay Tuned" column for TVSquad.com. Other critics were also comparing the series to the upcoming HBO series, Game of Thrones. Critic James Hibberd refers to both shows as "swords 'n' sorcery epics", with a "quest for the kingship as the central storyline" – but adds the comment that there is no reason to choose one over the other, implying that viewers might be able to enjoy both. Hibberd adds the one-word description, "fleshy", to describe the new Starz show. One website used the phrase, "Starz makes Camelot sexy again." A critic for the Daily Inquirer wrote, "I watched the sneak preview and it looks like Starz has another hit on their hands", and The New York Times called the series "An Arthur worthy of the modern ages." On the KFOG morning show Tim Goodman, The Hollywood Reporter's chief television critic, called Camelot "a lightweight version of Game of Thrones" and "almost more like a guilty pleasure".

Camelot received a score of 58 on Metacritic. Negative reviews included Time magazine saying, "Even on the level of it's-just-entertainment, Camelot is exceedingly silly", and the Pittsburgh Post-Gazette saying, "it's a lot less graphic than Starz's ultra-sexy, ultra-violent Spartacus franchise. Dramatically, Camelot also pales in comparison. It's dull and talky and its first three episodes offer few surprises in storytelling."

The two-hour premiere was the highest-rated and most-watched premiere for an original series on Starz at that time. The series was nominated for a Primetime Emmy Award, a Saturn Award and additional award nominations internationally.

== See also ==
- List of works based on Arthurian legends
