= Performance MainStreet =

Ownership
- Owner: Eicom PLC

History
- Launched: 2007
- Closed: 10 September 2008
- Replaced by: Rock On TV

Performance MainStreet (or Mainstreet as it appeared on the EPG) was an arts and entertainment television channel broadcast in the United Kingdom, on the Sky Digital platform.

The channel was closed down on 10 September 2008. It was replaced by Rock on TV on 1 October 2008.

The channel showed a mixture of jazz, classical music and classic and contemporary pop and rock. Programming included concerts, recitals, documentaries and star profiles from noted bands, singers and musicians. Music featured included jazz, classical, rock, pop, blues, soul and funk. The channel also showed repeats of the BBC Two television music show the Old Grey Whistle Test.

Originally Performance MainStreet broadcast mainly classic and contemporary rock music in its schedules, in contrast to its defunct sister channel the Performance Channel which concentrated more on classical music and jazz. After the closure of the Performance Channel in July 2008, the teleshopping has been removed from the morning schedule and replaced with a mixture of contemporary and classical music programming (teleshopping then only occupied the 12:00-15:00 timeslot).
