= Mick Robertson =

British children's TV presenter (born 1946)

- Born: 14 February 1946 (age 79); Petworth, Sussex, UK
- Occupation(s): Television producer Presenter

Michael Robertson (born 14 February 1946 in Petworth, Sussex) is a former presenter of the ITV children's television magazine programme Magpie.

== Early career ==
He attended Midhurst Grammar School and trained as a teacher before working in a London play scheme. He then worked as a researcher for Thames Television.

== Children's TV ==
He co-presented Magpie from 1972 to 1980, then went on to present an out of school activity programme called Freetime. When Freetime was dropped by ITV in 1985, he helped to establish The Children's Channel, where he presented a show called Roustabout.

Since the 1980s he has produced television programmes for children, including the series Wise Up and Blunt, and has won several Children's BAFTAs. In 2007, he was awarded the Special Award Children's BAFTA for his work in television. Accepting his award he said

I am hugely proud to be receiving my Bafta award. My television career has been entirely spent in making programmes for children. There is no more important audience. ...All my programmes have been in the factual entertainment genre which is fast disappearing from children's screens because of its minority appeal. ...I hope ways will be found to support factual television for children in the future. They should always enjoy a rich and varied viewing choice.
