= Paperplay =

- Genre: Live-action/puppet TV series
- Created by: Susan Stranks
- Presented by: Susan Stranks
- Country of origin: United Kingdom
- Original language: English
- No. of episodes: 182

Production
- Producers: Vic Hughes; Charles Warren
- Running time: 10 minutes

Original release
- Network: ITV
- Release: 2 April 1974 – 16 March 1981

Paperplay is a British children's television programme, produced by Thames Television for the ITV network between 1974 and 1981. The show was devised and presented by Susan Stranks, a former Magpie presenter.

In each show, Stranks would make simple creations from paper and other household waste. Assisting her would be two mischievous hand puppet spiders named Itsy and Bitsy. Itsy was the red male, growling spider and Bitsy the yellow female, squeaking spider. Occasionally they were joined by other puppets, such as Boris the ladybird, Cardew the caterpillar and Katie the bird. The puppets were operated by Norman Beardsley, who was hidden by a black backdrop.
