= Hampstead Heath =

Public open space in London, England

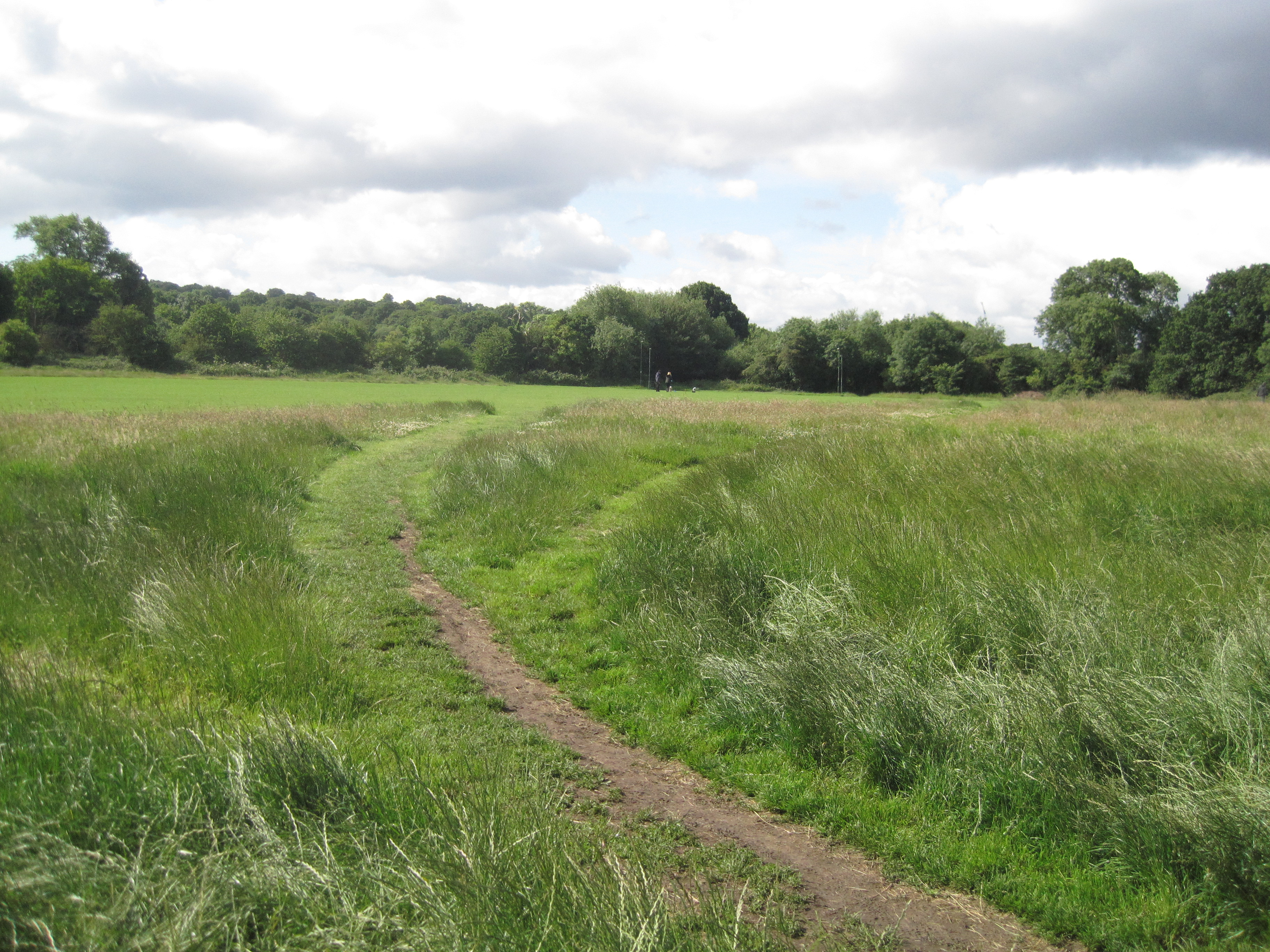
- Hampstead Heath extension towards Barnet.

- Location within London Borough of Camden
- Type: Public park
- Location: London, England
- Coordinates: 51°33′37″N 0°9′39″W
- Area: 790 acres (320 ha)
- Operator: City of London Corporation
- Status: Open year round
- Website: www.cityoflondon.gov.uk/things-to-do/green-spaces/hampstead-heath

Hampstead Heath is an ancient heath in London, spanning 320 hectares (790 acres). This grassy public space sits astride a sandy ridge, one of the highest points in London, running from Hampstead to Highgate, which rests on a band of London Clay.

The heath is rambling and hilly, embracing ponds, recent and ancient woodlands, a lido, playgrounds, and a training track, and it adjoins the former stately home of Kenwood House and its estate. The southeast part of the heath is Parliament Hill, from which the view over London is protected by law.

Running along its eastern perimeter is a chain of ponds – including three open-air public swimming pools – which were originally reservoirs for drinking water from the River Fleet. The heath is a Site of Metropolitan Importance for Nature Conservation, and part of Kenwood is a Site of Special Scientific Interest. Lakeside concerts are held there in summer. The heath is managed by the City of London Corporation, and lies mostly within the London Borough of Camden, with the adjoining Hampstead Heath Extension and Golders Hill Park in the London Borough of Barnet.

== History ==
=== Early history ===
Archaeological discoveries on Hampstead Heath, including tools from the Mesolithic, pits, postholes, and charred stones, point to the presence of a hunter-gatherer community around 7000 BC.

Documentary evidence of Hampstead Heath dates from 986, when Ethelred the Unready granted five hides of land at "Hemstede" to the Abbot of Westminster. This same land is later recorded in the Domesday Book of 1086 as held by the monastery of St. Peter's at Westminster Abbey, and by then it is known as the "Manor of Hampstead". Westminster held the land until 1133, when control of part of the manor was released to Richard de Balta; then during Henry II's reign the whole of the manor became privately owned by Alexander de Barentyn, the King's butler.

=== 19th century legal and political battles ===
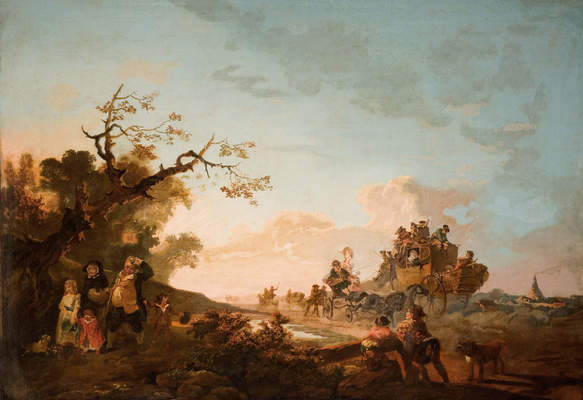
Hampstead Heath by Philip James de Loutherbourg, 1787,

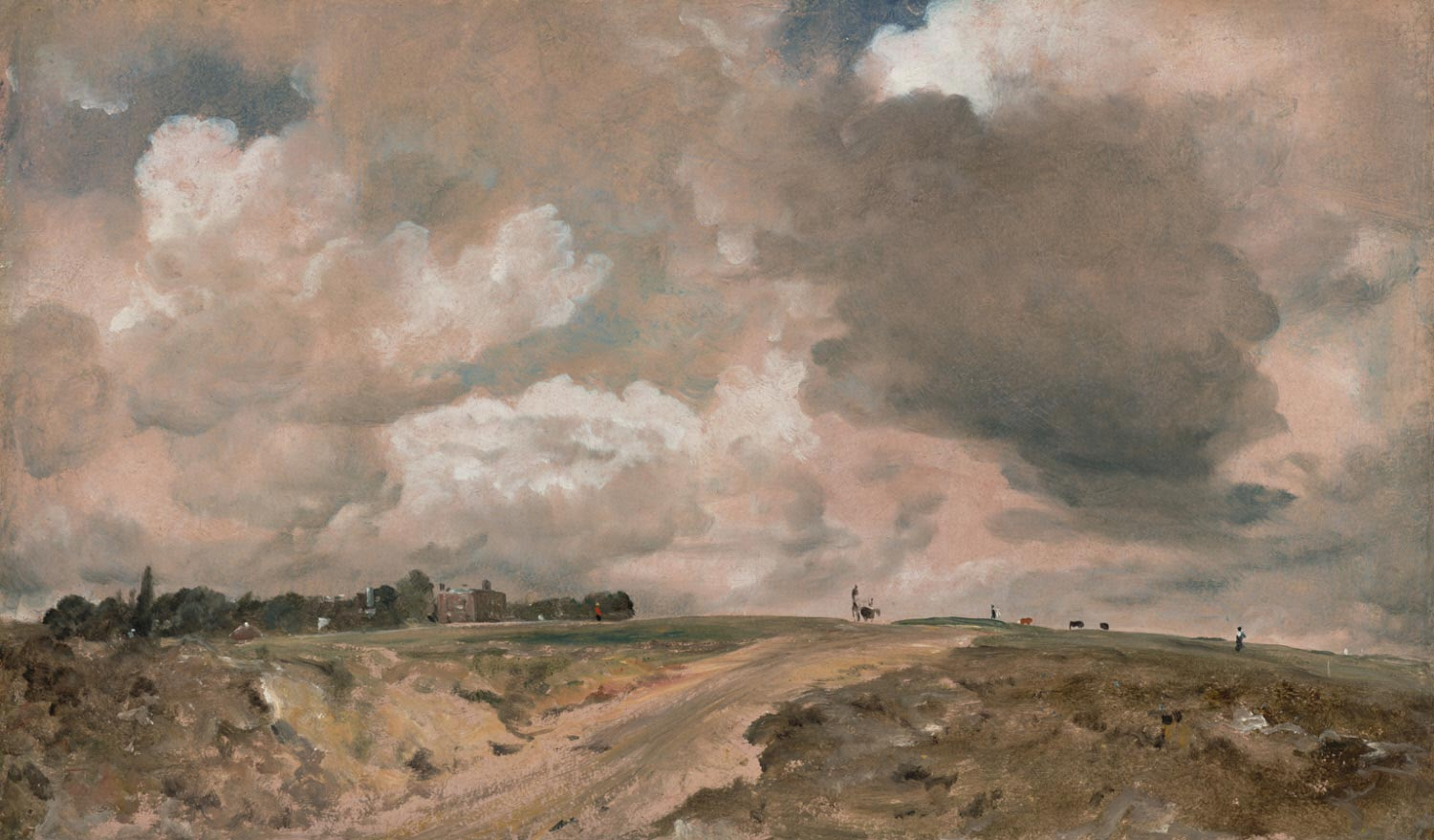
Road to the Spaniards, Hampstead by John Constable, 1822

In 1767, the Manor of Hampstead and the estate which went with it came into the possession of the Wilson family following the marriage of General Sir Thomas Spencer Wilson, sixth baronet, to Jane Weller, niece and heir of the Revd. John Maryon. The estate consisted of 416 acres (168 ha), being mainly farmland to the west and north west of the village and including the heath.

From 1808 to 1814 Hampstead Heath hosted a station in the shutter telegraph chain which connected the Admiralty in London to its naval ships in the port of Great Yarmouth.

In 1821 Sir Thomas Maryon Wilson, eighth baronet, inherited the estate from his father. The construction of the Finchley Road through Hampstead promised to open up the land for development, but under the terms of his father's will, Sir Thomas could neither sell any of the land nor grant leases on it for periods greater than 21 years, thus making it unsuitable for building.

In 1829 Sir Thomas tried to circumvent the will by promoting a bill in Parliament which would have allowed him to grant leases of up to 99 years. This was a straightforward procedure and would normally have been passed without difficulty but because the bill included a provision to build on the heath, it attracted considerable opposition. This came partly from individuals who held certain rights under the ancient system of copyhold, and also from influential figures who valued the heath as a natural asset and a place of recreation. The bill was passed by the House of Lords but was rejected by the House of Commons.

In 1830 Sir Thomas lodged a second bill. This specifically excluded the heath from development, but it did not exclude the 60 acres (24 ha) East Park Estate which lay between the eastern part of the heath and Lord Mansfield's estate at Kenwood and Parliament Hill Fields. This bill also attracted opposition, on the grounds that if building was allowed on the East Park Estate, the East Heath would be surrounded by houses and its natural beauty would be lost. This bill also failed.

Sir Thomas was to spend most of the rest of his life trying to obtain permission to grant leases for building. The matter became a cause célèbre, with the opposition being led by such influential figures as John Gurney Hoare and Lord Mansfield.

Although unable to grant leases for building, there was nothing to prevent Sir Thomas from undertaking his own building work. In the mid 1840s, he drew up plans to build 28 villas on the East Park Estate. Work was started on an access road, a wall and a gamekeeper's hut, remnants of which still survive. However, because of landslips and problems of water penetration, attempts to build a viaduct to carry the road failed and the entire project was abandoned.

In 1866 the Hampstead Heath Protection Fund Committee was formed, a forerunner of the Heath & Hampstead Society which still campaigns to protect the heath.

In 1869 Sir Thomas died and the estate passed to his brother, Sir John Maryon Wilson. By now there was considerable pressure for public ownership of the heath. This was led by the Commons Preservation Society, which had been formed in 1865 with the specific aim of protecting common land.

Hampstead Heath Act 1871
- Act of Parliament
- Parliament of the United Kingdom
- Long title: An Act for effecting a transfer to the Metropolitan Board of Works of the open space known as Hampstead Heath, and for enabling them to preserve, improve, and regulate the same; and for other purposes.
- Citation: 34 & 35 Vict. c. lxxvii

Dates
- Royal assent: 29 June 1871

Text of statute as originally enacted

In 1870 the Metropolitan Board of Works agreed to buy the heath on behalf of the public at a cost of £45,000 plus £2,000 for legal fees. The board also agreed to compensate the copyholders for the loss of their rights. The Hampstead Heath Act 1871 (34 & 35 Vict. c. lxxvii) was passed, stating that it would be "of great advantage to the inhabitants of the Metropolis if the Heath were always kept unenclosed and unbuilt on, its natural aspect and state being as far as may be preserved."

Hampstead Heath Enlargement Act 1886
- Act of Parliament
- Parliament of the United Kingdom
- Long title: An Act to provide for the acquisition of Parliament Hill and other Lands and their addition to Hampstead Heath.
- Citation: 50 Vict. c. xli

Dates
- Royal assent: 25 September 1886

Text of statute as originally enacted

Pressure then grew to purchase the East Park Estate and the 200 acres (81 ha) Parliament Hill Fields, but no funds were available for this. A public fund-raising campaign was launched, led by the philanthropist Baroness Burdett-Coutts and the campaigner Octavia Hill. This succeeded in raising the required £300,000, and in 1899 the East Park Estate and Parliament Hill Fields were added to the heath by the Hampstead Heath Enlargement Act 1886 (50 Vict. c. xli).

=== Later extensions ===
The Heath was further extended in 1898 with the purchase of Golders Hill Park for £38,000 from the estate of Sir Thomas Spencer Wells.

In 1904 following a campaign led by Henrietta Barnett, Wyldes Farm was purchased from Eton College. This land too was added to the Heath, and it is now known as the Heath Extension. The rest of Wyldes Farm was purchased by Henrietta Barnett to found the Hampstead Garden Suburb. Another fund-raising campaign led by Arthur Crosfield enabled part of Kenwood to be purchased. This land was added to the Heath in 1922. Finally, Kenwood House and its adjacent ground were incorporated into the Heath in 1928 following a bequest by their owner, the Earl of Iveagh.

=== Railway controversy ===
A controversy arose in 1900 when the Charing Cross, Euston and Hampstead Railway submitted a parliamentary bill for an underground railway line between Hampstead and Golders Green. The company already had powers to build a line from Charing Cross to Hampstead, terminating at a station in Heath Street. That line would follow the course of existing streets and was therefore uncontroversial. The proposed extension, however, would involve tunnelling under part of the Heath.

The Heath & Hampstead Society opposed the scheme on the basis that the tunnels would drain the sub-soil and that the vibration of passing trains would damage trees. The campaign received support from The Times, which published a strongly-worded editorial opposing the railway but the claims were refuted by the railway company, who argued that the tunnels would be passing through impermeable clay at a depth of more than 200 feet (61 m) and would therefore have no effect on the Heath's ecology.

The bill was passed by Parliament, with the Charing Cross, Euston and Hampstead Railway Act 1902 (2 Edw. 7. c. cclvi) receiving its royal assent on 18 November 1902. The line, from Charing Cross to Golders Green, was opened in 1907. It now forms part of the London Underground Northern line.

=== Recent developments ===
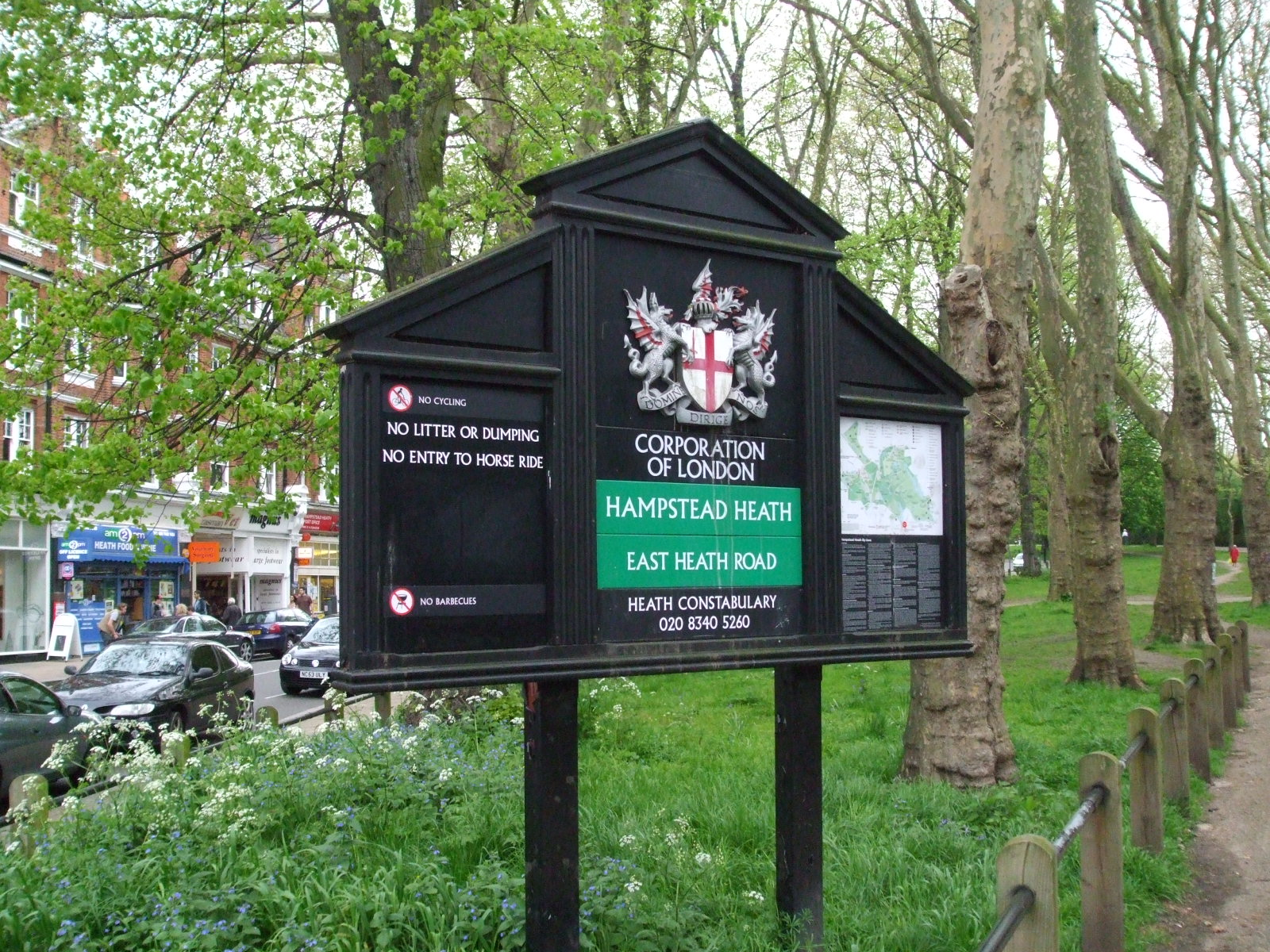
Corporation of London sign on the south-west edge of the heath

The City of London Corporation has managed the heath since 1989. Before that it was managed by the Greater London Council (GLC) and before that by the London County Council (LCC).

Heath Hands was formed by the local community in 1999 and with the assistance of volunteers, they help to conserve the heath and provide learning and wellbeing opportunities.

In 2005, the City of London Corporation allowed sculptor Giancarlo Neri to exhibit 'The Writer' on Hampstead Heath. The heath was chosen because of the area's long association with writers. There was some debate as to the suitability of the heath for the exhibit. The launch was attended by some prominent writers.

In 2021 Quiet Parks International, a non-profit organisation whose aim is to identify locations around the world that remain free from human-made noise for at least brief periods, gave Hampstead Heath "Urban Quiet Park" status.

In September 2023 sheep made a return to Hampstead Heath as part of an initiative by the City of London Corporation. The initiative aimed to enhance biodiversity through controlled grazing, utilizing a flock of five rare-breed Norfolk Horn and Oxford Down. This followed a successful trial in 2019 which was the first instance of sheep grazing on the Heath since the 1950s.

== Geography ==
Part of the heath sits astride a sandy ridge that runs from east to west and rests on a band of London clay. Its highest point is at 134 metres (440 ft). As the sand was easily penetrated by rainwater which was then held by the clay, a landscape of swampy hollows, springs and man-made excavations was created. Hampstead Heath contains the largest single area of common land in Greater London, with 144.93 hectares (358.1 acres) of protected commons.

Public transport near the heath includes:

- London Overground railway stations: Hampstead Heath and Gospel Oak
- London Underground stations: Hampstead and Belsize Park to the south; Golders Green to the northwest; Highgate and Archway to the east and Kentish Town to the south-east.

Buses serve several roads around the heath.

== Areas of the heath ==
The heath's 320 hectares (790 acres) include a number of distinct areas.

=== Whitestone, Highgate and Hampstead Ponds ===
Hampstead Heath has over 25 ponds; most of these are in two distinct areas: the Highgate Ponds and the Hampstead Ponds.

==== Whitestone Pond ====
Whitestone Pond is a roughly triangular shallow pond, located on the heath's southwest side and north-northwest of Queen Mary's House (formerly a care home and before that a maternity hospital), across busy Heath Street (A502). Originally a small dew pond called the Horse Pond, it was renamed after a waypoint stone and is artificially fed. It has an exposed location, one of the highest in London, surrounded by roads, which limits its recreational use. It is the heath's most obvious body of water, and many people's introduction to Hampstead Heath's ponds.

==== Highgate Ponds ====
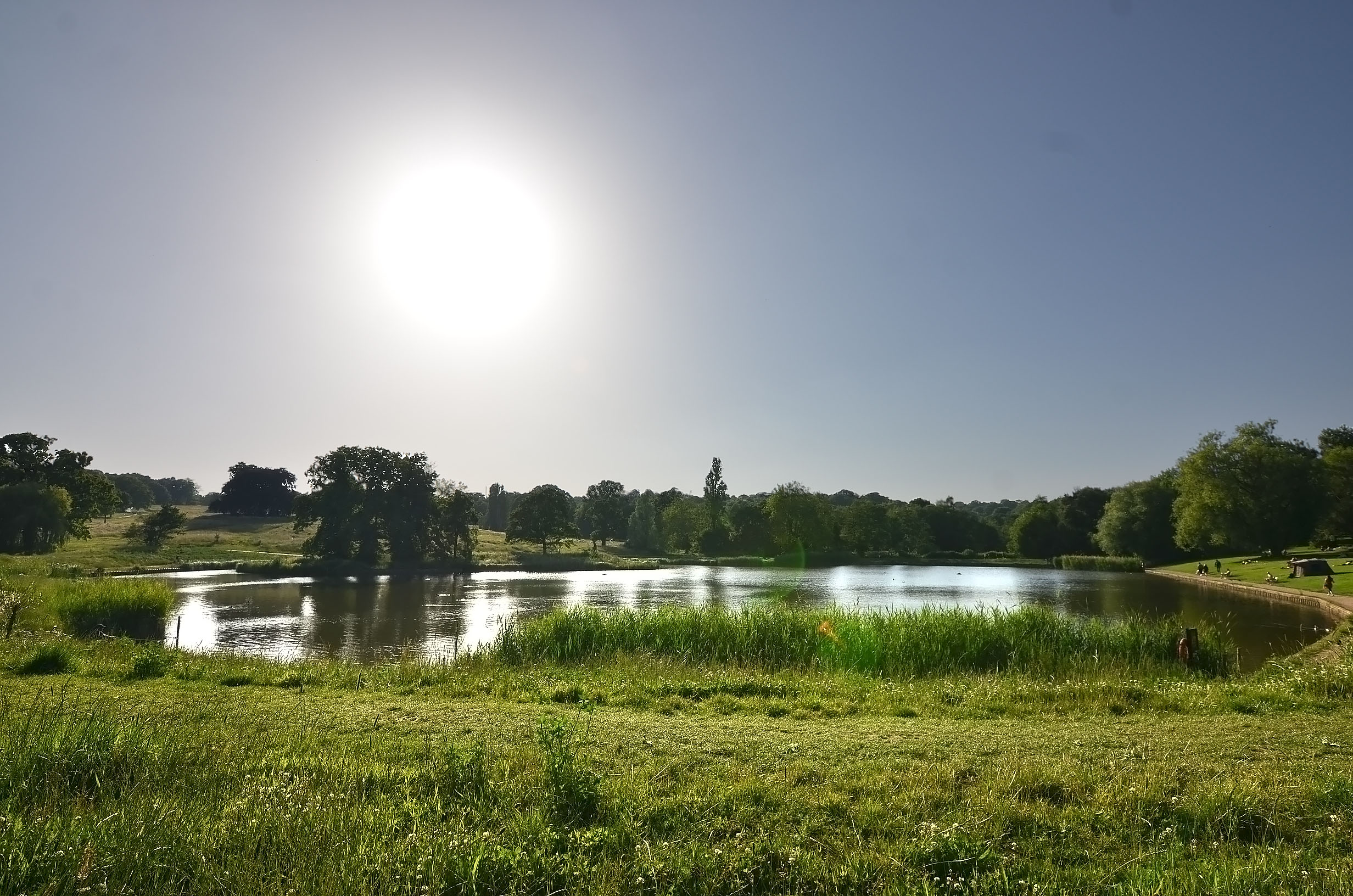
Hampstead Heath's Model Boating Pond (Highgate Pond No. 3)

Highgate Ponds are a series of eight former reservoirs, on the heath's east (Highgate) side, and were originally dug in the 17th and 18th centuries. They include two single-sex swimming pools (the men's and ladies' bathing ponds), a model boating pond, and two ponds which serve as wildlife reserves: the Stock Pond and the Bird Sanctuary Pond. Fishing is allowed in some of the ponds, although this is threatened by proposals to modify the dams.

The ponds are the result of the 1777 damming of Hampstead Brook (one of the Fleet River's sources), by the Hampstead Water Company, which was formed in 1692 to meet London's growing water demands.

"Boudicca's Mound", near the present men's bathing pond, is a tumulus where, according to local legend, Queen Boudicca (Boadicea) was buried after she and 10,000 Iceni warriors were defeated at Battle Bridge. However, historical drawings and paintings of the area show no mound other than a 17th-century windmill.

==== Hampstead Ponds ====
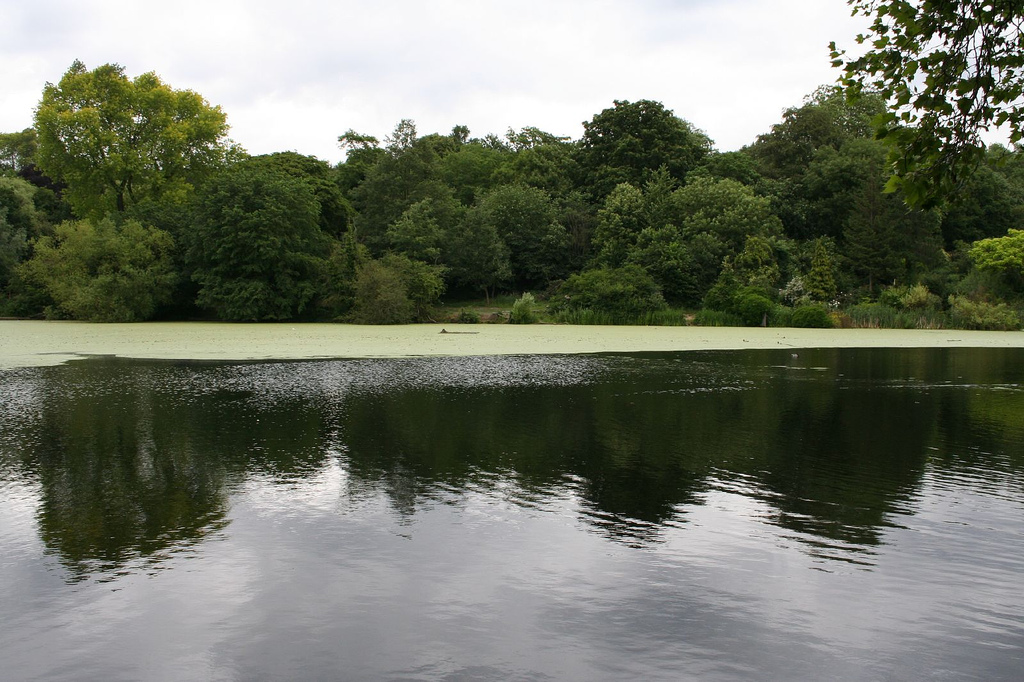
Hampstead Pond No. 1

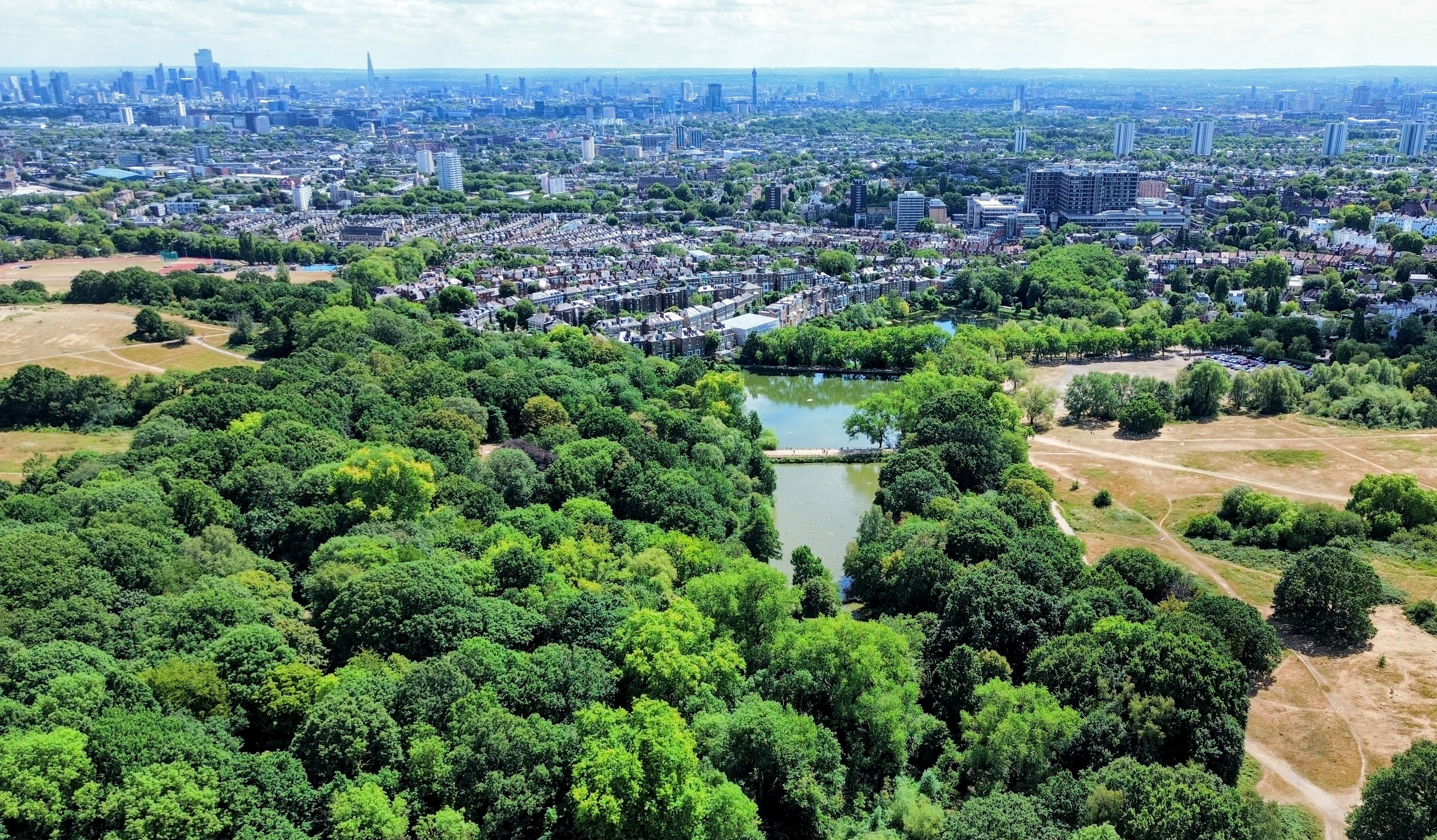
An aerial view over Pond No. 3, looking towards the centre of London. To the left is Parliament Hill, including the playground and athletics track in the distance.

The Hampstead Ponds are three ponds in the heath's south edge, towards South End Green. Hampstead Pond No. 3 is the mixed bathing pond, where both sexes may swim.

==== Pond legal challenges and maintenance ====
In 2004 the City of London Corporation, rejected a proposal by the Hampstead Heath Winter Swimming Club to allow "early-morning, self-regulated swimming in the mixed sex pond on Hampstead Heath"; the corporation argued that it risked legal action by the Health and Safety Executive if it allowed such swimming, since the executive had refused to give assurances to the corporation that it would not be prosecuted under the Health and Safety at Work etc. Act 1974. The swimmers successfully challenged this in the High Court, which in 2005 ruled that members of the swimming club had the right to swim at their own risk, and that the corporation would not be liable under the act for injuries as a result.

In January 2011 the City of London announced a scheme which it said would improve the safety of the dams, to guard against damage that might result from a very large, but rare, storm hitting London. The proposed engineering modifications of the dams were aimed at ensuring that three dams complied with the Reservoirs Act 1975. With the passage of the Flood and Water Management Act 2010 the City of London was advised that all the dams on the heath would need to comply with the reservoir safety regulations. The proposed works in 2011 included recommendations to improve the water quality of the lake, which had suffered from algae blooms. The proposals for the pond dams were extensively modified in 2012–2014. The proposals were challenged by a consortium of groups and societies collectively called "Dam Nonsense".

In 2016, the dam project was completed, protecting the dams from collapse and providing ecological benefits. When the model boating pond was dredged in the previous year, during the project, a vintage Ford Cortina was found. It became a local landmark and someone scaled the security fence to clamp it. Many locals now accept the changes to the dams, as wildlife begins to soften the border between the artificial and the natural in this area.

=== Caen Wood Towers ===
To the northeast of the heath is a derelict site within the conservation area comprising the grounds and mansion of the former Caen Wood Towers (renamed Athlone House in 1972). This historic building, currently in disrepair, was built in 1872 for Edward Brooke, aniline dye manufacturer (architect, Edward Salomons). In 1942 the building was taken for war service by the Royal Air Force and was used to house the RAF Intelligence School, although the 'official' line was that it was a convalescence hospital. The Operational Record (Form 540) of RAF Station Highgate (currently in the National Archives, Kew) was declassified in the late 1990s and shows the true role of this building in wartime service.

The building sustained two near misses from V-1 flying bombs in late 1944, causing damage and injuries to staff. The RAF Intelligence School remained in Caen Wood Towers until 1948, when the building was handed over to the Ministry of Health. It was then used as a hospital and finally a post-operative recovery lodge, before falling into disrepair in the 1980s. The NHS sold off this part of their estate in 2004 to a private businessman who is currently redeveloping much of the site; however the House and its gardens fall within the conservation area of Hampstead Heath.

=== Parliament Hill Fields ===
Parliament Hill Fields lies on the south and east of the heath. It officially became part of the heath in 1888. It contains various sporting facilities including an athletics track, tennis courts and Parliament Hill Lido. Parliament Hill itself is considered by some to be the focal point of the heath, with the highest part of it known to some as "Kite Hill" due to its suitability for kite flying.

The hill is 98.1 metres (322 ft) high and is notable for its view of the London skyline. The skyscrapers of Canary Wharf and the City of London can be seen, along with St Paul's Cathedral and other landmarks, all in one panorama, parts of which are protected views. The main staff yards for the management of the heath are located at Parliament Hill Fields.

In the southeast of the heath, on the southern slopes of Parliament Hill, is the Gospel Oak Lido open air swimming pool, with a running track and fitness area to its north. Parliament Hill Fields was successfully defended from development in the late 19th century by Octavia Hill and the Commons Preservation Society.

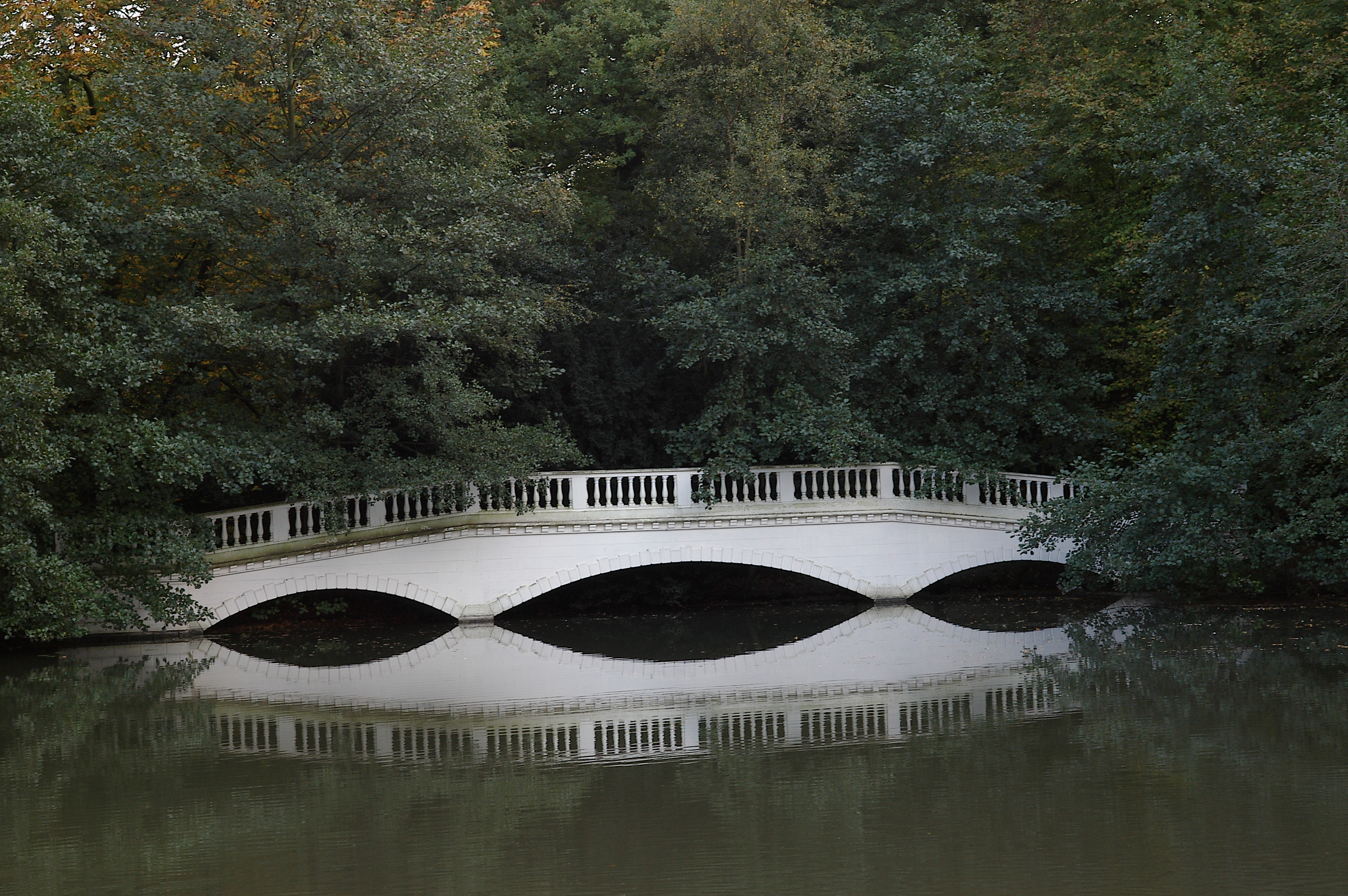
Kenwood House false bridge

=== Kenwood ===
The area to the north of the heath is the Kenwood Estate and House – a total area of 50 hectares (120 acres) which is maintained by English Heritage. This became part of the heath when it was bequeathed to the nation by Lord Iveagh on his death in 1927, and opened to the public in 1928. The original house dates from the early 17th century. The orangery was added in about 1700.

=== Hampstead Heath Woods ===
One third of the Kenwood estate (Ken Wood and North Wood) is a biological Site of Special Scientific Interest, designated by Natural England.

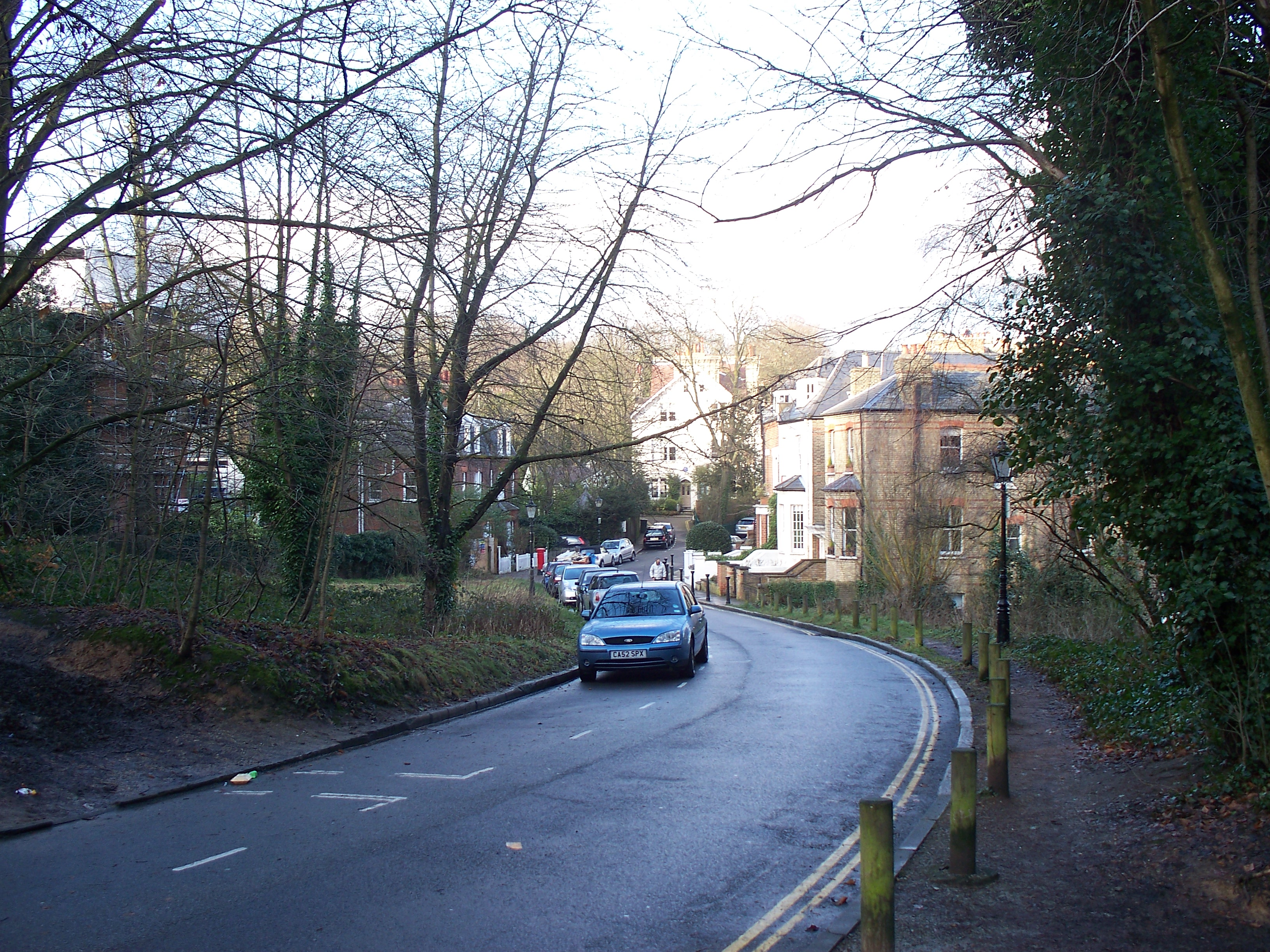
Leading down to the Vale of Health

=== The Vale of Health ===
Vale of Health, Hampstead by John Constable, 1827

The Vale of Health is a hamlet accessed by a lane from East Heath Road; it is surrounded entirely by the heath. In 1714, one Samuel Hatch, a harness maker, built a workshop and was granted some land. By 1720, he had a cottage at what was subsequently called Hatch's or Hatchett's Bottom. A new name, regarded as a deliberate attempt to change the image of a developing location, the Vale of Health, was recorded in 1801.

=== Extension ===
The Extension is an open space to the northwest of the main heath. It does not share the history of common and heathland of the rest of the heath. Instead it was created out of farmland, largely due to the efforts of Henrietta Barnett who went on to found Hampstead Garden Suburb. Its farmland origins can still be seen in the form of old field boundaries, hedgerows and trees.

=== The Hill Garden and Pergola ===
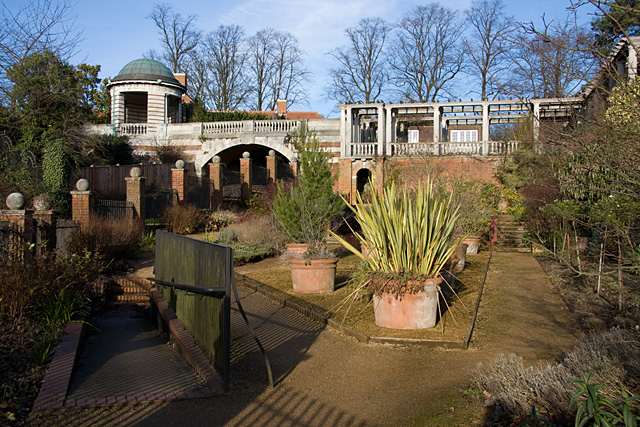
Part of the Hill Garden and Pergola seen in 2008

The Hill Garden and Pergola lie to the west of Inverforth House (formerly The Hill), and were laid out from 1906 by Thomas Hayton Mawson as private gardens for Lord Leverhulme. After neglect in recent decades the garden and pergola are in the care of the City of London Corporation, are being restored, and are open to the public but locked at night.

Several buildings within the garden are individually listed at Grade II* or Grade II. Those at Grade II* include: the summerhouse at the western end of the pergola, which has extensive views over Hampstead Heath towards Harrow on the Hill; a summerhouse to the south of the garden; the southern pergola and terrace; the Cruciform pergola; a bridge; the Central Temple summerhouse; and the western pergola. The structures listed at Grade II are: the pond and its architectural surround; and the garden terrace steps.

=== Golders Hill Park ===
Golders Hill Park is a formal park adjoining the West Heath. It occupies the site of a large house that was bombed during World War II. It has an expanse of grass, with a formal flower garden, a duck pond and a separate water garden that leads to a separate area for deer, near a recently renovated small zoo. The zoo has donkeys, maras, ring-tailed lemurs, ring-tailed coatis, white-cheeked turacos and European eagle-owls, among other animals. There are also tennis courts, a butterfly house and a putting green.

Unlike most of the rest of the heath, Golders Hill Park is fenced in, and is closed at night.

== Site of Special Scientific Interest ==
Ken Wood and North Wood are a biological Site of Special Scientific Interest called Hampstead Heath Woods, designated by Natural England.

== Constabulary ==
The heath is policed by the Hampstead Heath Constabulary, part of the City of London Corporation. Its constables are:

called upon to enforce Byelaws, Common Law and Criminal Law, protect City of London property and provide a response to any incident that may disrupt the enjoyment of users of these sites.

From their inauguration until 24 May 2018 some constables worked with general purpose dogs, all licensed to NPCC/Home Office standards. They have been responsible for patrolling the Heath since 1992.

== Activities ==
The heath is home to a range of activities, including 16 different sports. It is used by walkers, runners, swimmers and kite-flyers. Running events include the weekly parkrun and the annual Race for Life in aid of Cancer Research UK. Until February 2007 Kenwood held a series of popular lakeside concerts.

Facilities include an athletics track, a pétanque pitch, a volleyball court and eight separate children's play areas, including an adventure playground.

Swimming takes place all year round in two of the three natural swimming ponds: the men's pond which opened in the 1890s, and the ladies' pond which opened in 1925. The mixed pond is only open from May to September, though it is the oldest, having been in use since the 1860s.

The West Heath has been noted as a site for cruising for gay sex since Victorian times, including a tree used to facilitate sex, dubbed the "fuck tree". The tree was the subject of anti-cruising protests in 2025.

== In popular culture ==
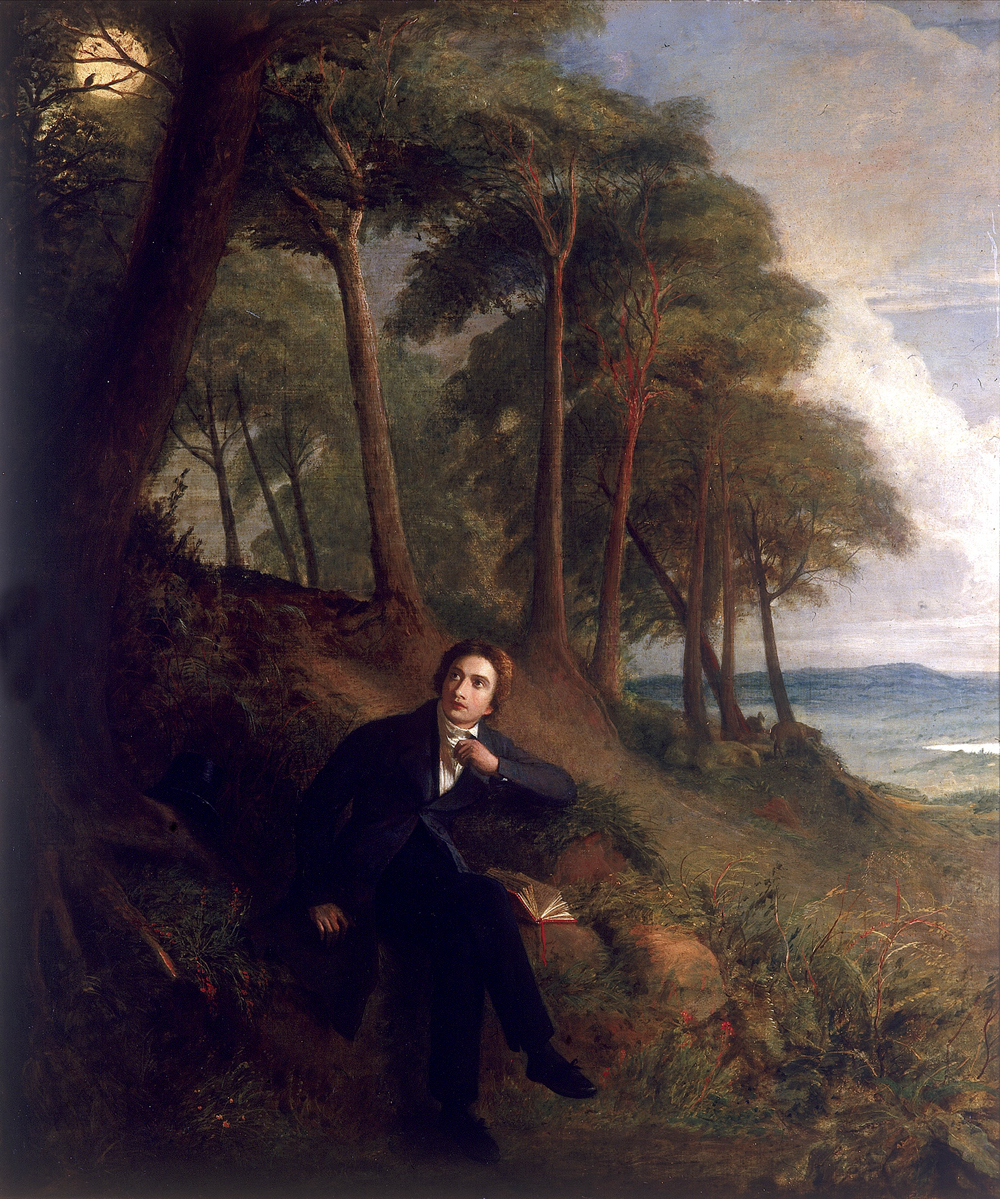
Keats Listening to a Nightingale on Hampstead Heath by Joseph Severn, 1845

While living in London, Karl Marx and his family went to the heath regularly, as their favourite outing.

Hampstead Heath provides the backdrop for the opening scene in Victorian writer Wilkie Collins' novel The Woman in White.

Bram Stoker's novel Dracula is partly set on Hampstead Heath, in scenes when the undead Lucy abducts children playing on the heath.

Hampstead Heath forms part of the location for G. K. Chesterton's fictional story "The Blue Cross" from The Innocence of Father Brown. The Heath is mentioned in Ralph Vaughan Williams' Symphony no. 2 'A London Symphony' with the subtitle 'Hampstead Heath on an August Bank Holiday'.

The photos used for the cover of The Kinks' LP The Kinks Are The Village Green Preservation Society were taken on the Heath in August 1968. In some photographs, Witanhurst is visible in the background.

Notting Hill (1999) featured scenes shot at the heath, located primarily around Kenwood House, where Julia Roberts' character was filming a movie.

The film Scenes of a Sexual Nature (2006) was shot entirely on Hampstead Heath.

Colin Wilson slept rough (in a sleeping bag) on Hampstead Heath to save money when he was working on his first novel, Ritual in the Dark.

In John le Carré's novel Smiley's People, the heath is the murder scene of General Vladimir, a pivotal event that leads to the downfall of George Smiley's nemesis Karla.

Hampstead is a 2017 film directed by Joel Hopkins about Harry Hallowes, who claimed squatter's rights on a corner of the heath on which he lived in a makeshift camp.

Harry Style's song Grapejuice mentions Hampstead Heath in this sentence, "Thought that we could hide away in a corner of the heath." This is from the album Harry's House.

Taylor Swift mentions the heath in her song "So Long, London" from her album The Tortured Poets Department.

== Gallery ==
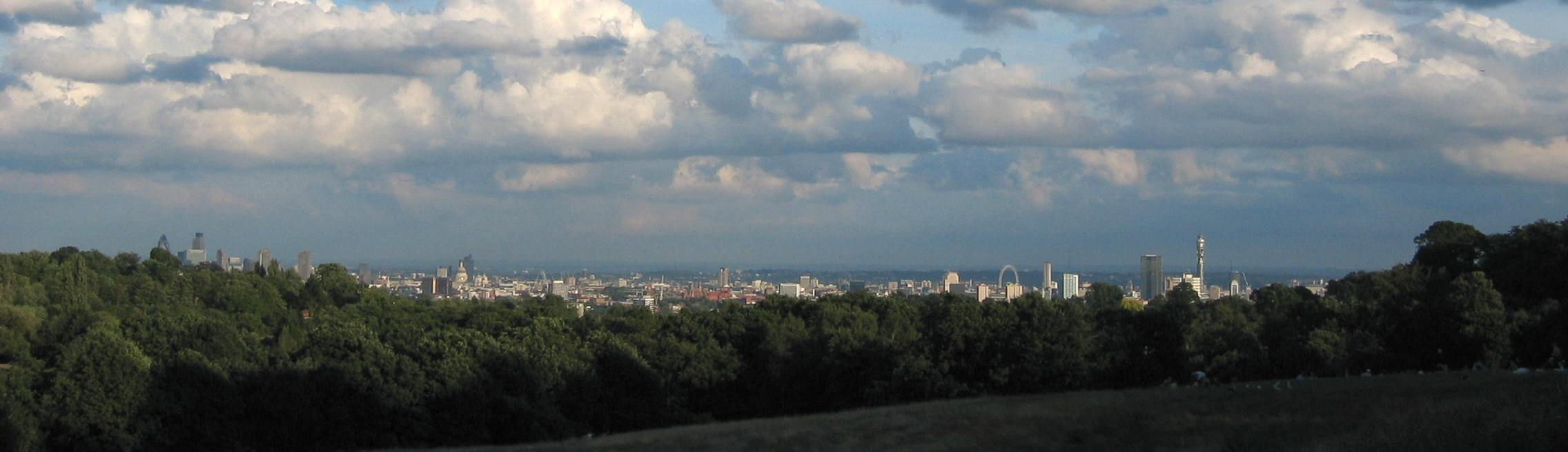

Panorama of London from Kenwood (after completion of the Gherkin in 2003 but before the building of the Heron Tower in 2009–10).

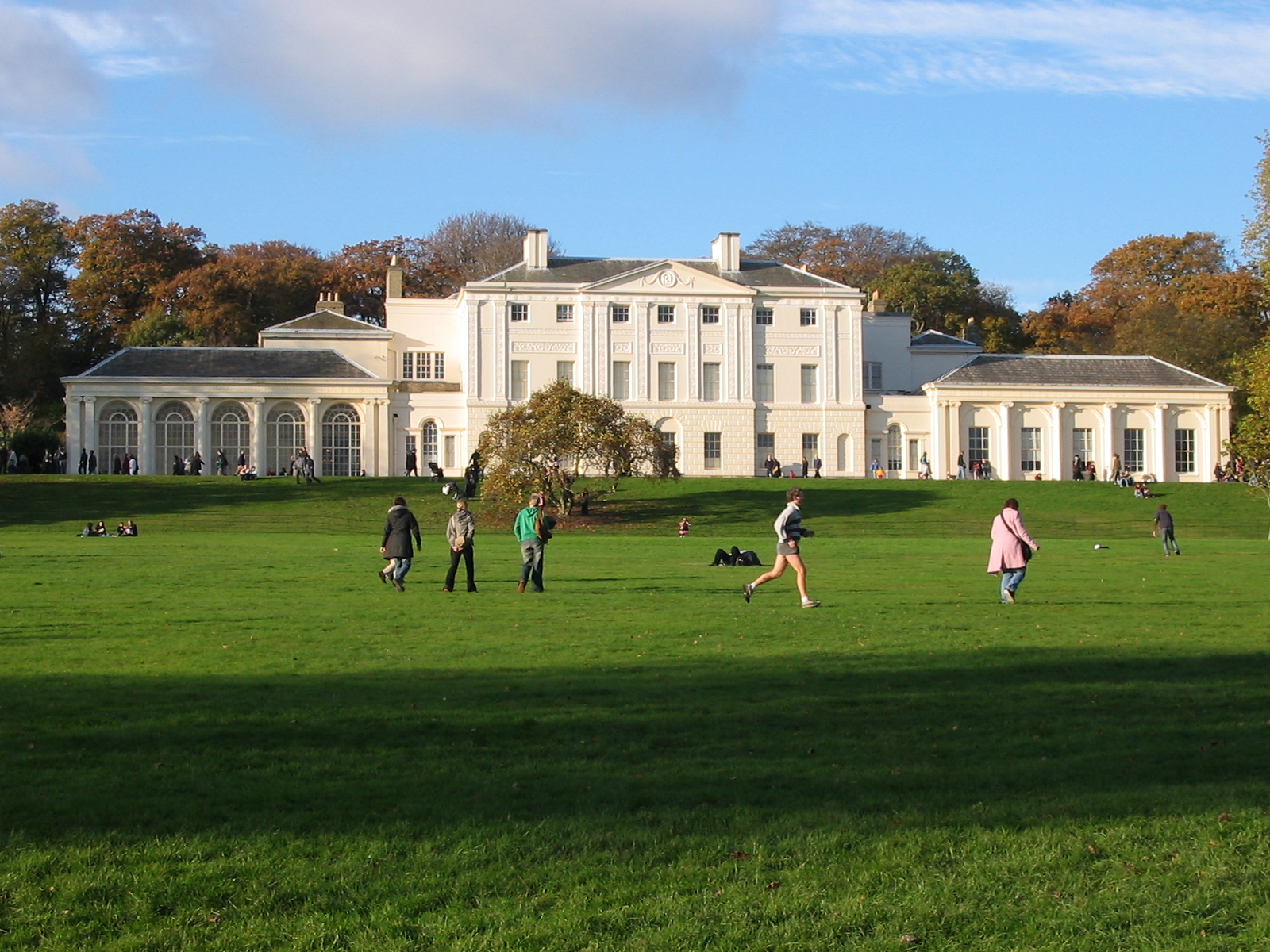
Kenwood House

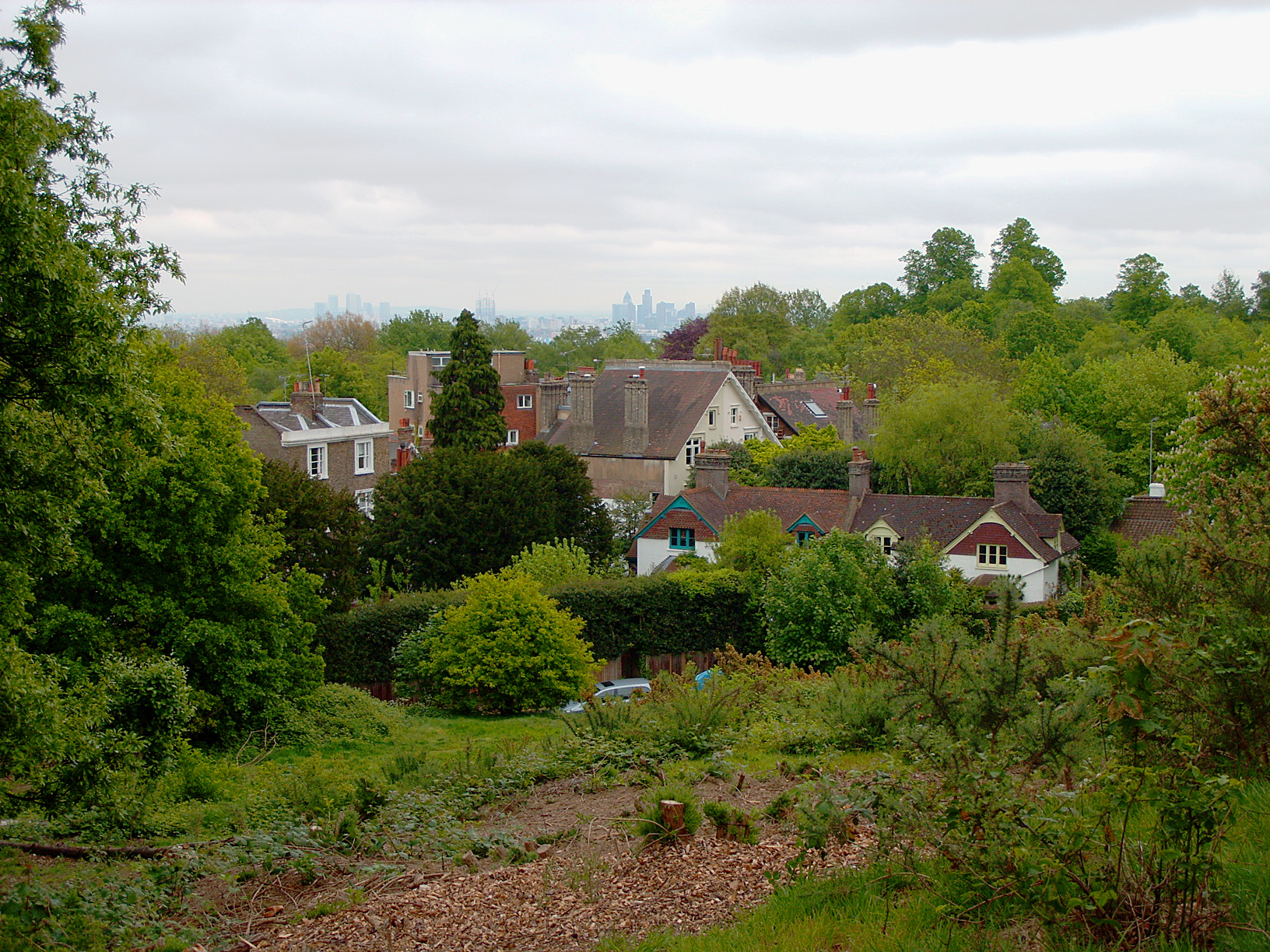
The Vale of Health

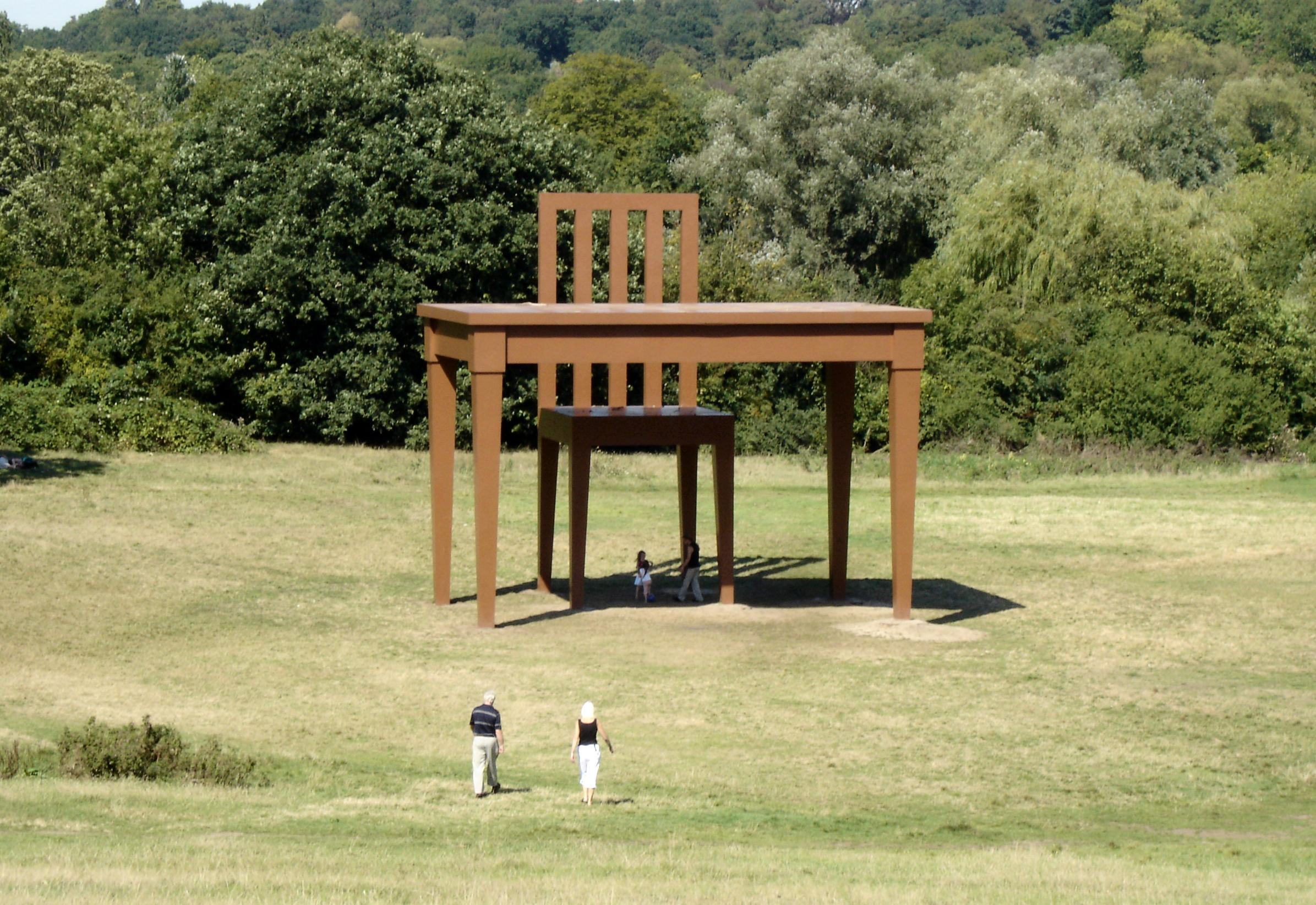
The Writer, temporary structure in 2005

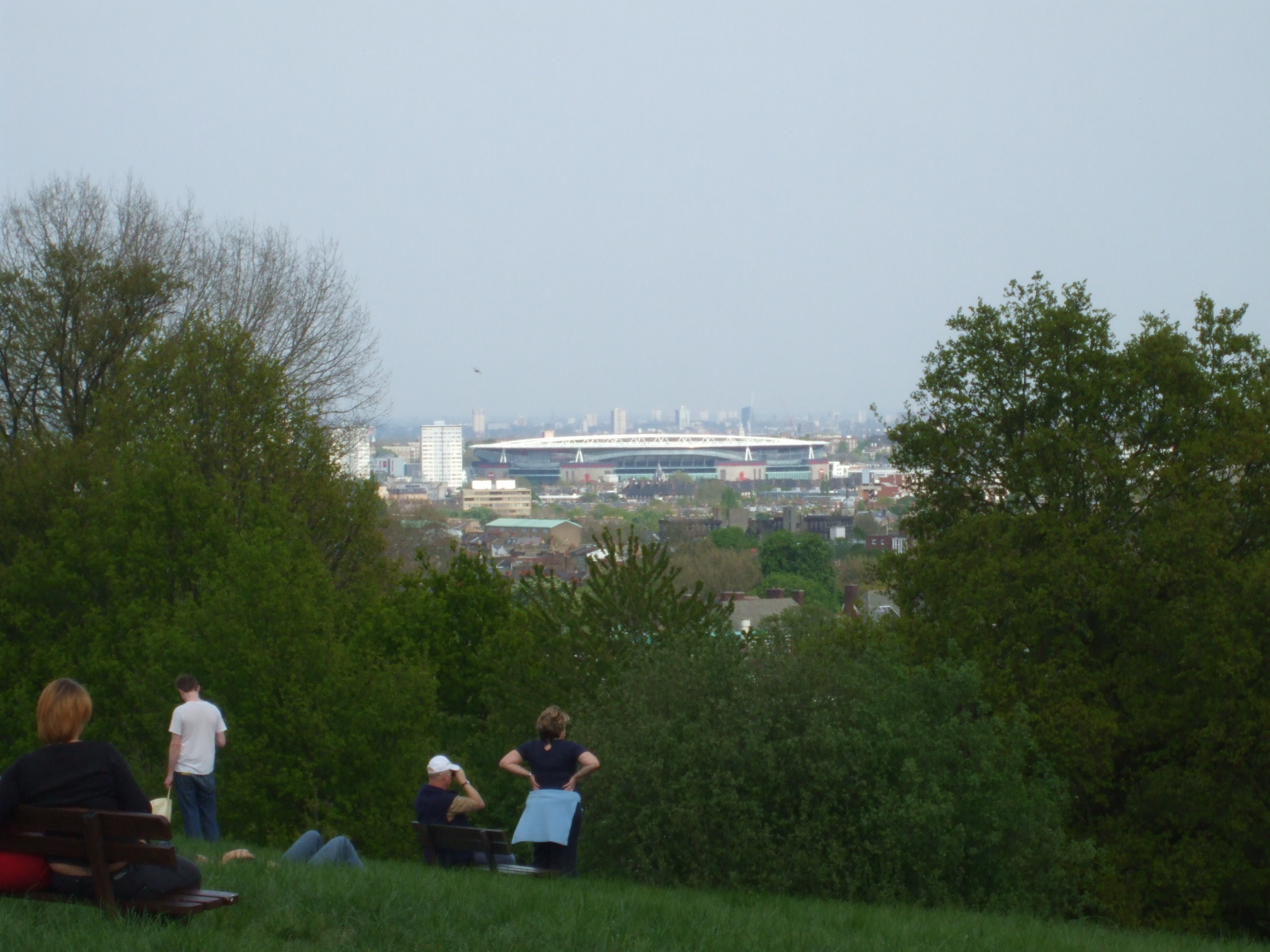
Arsenal F.C.'s Emirates Stadium viewed from Hampstead Heath

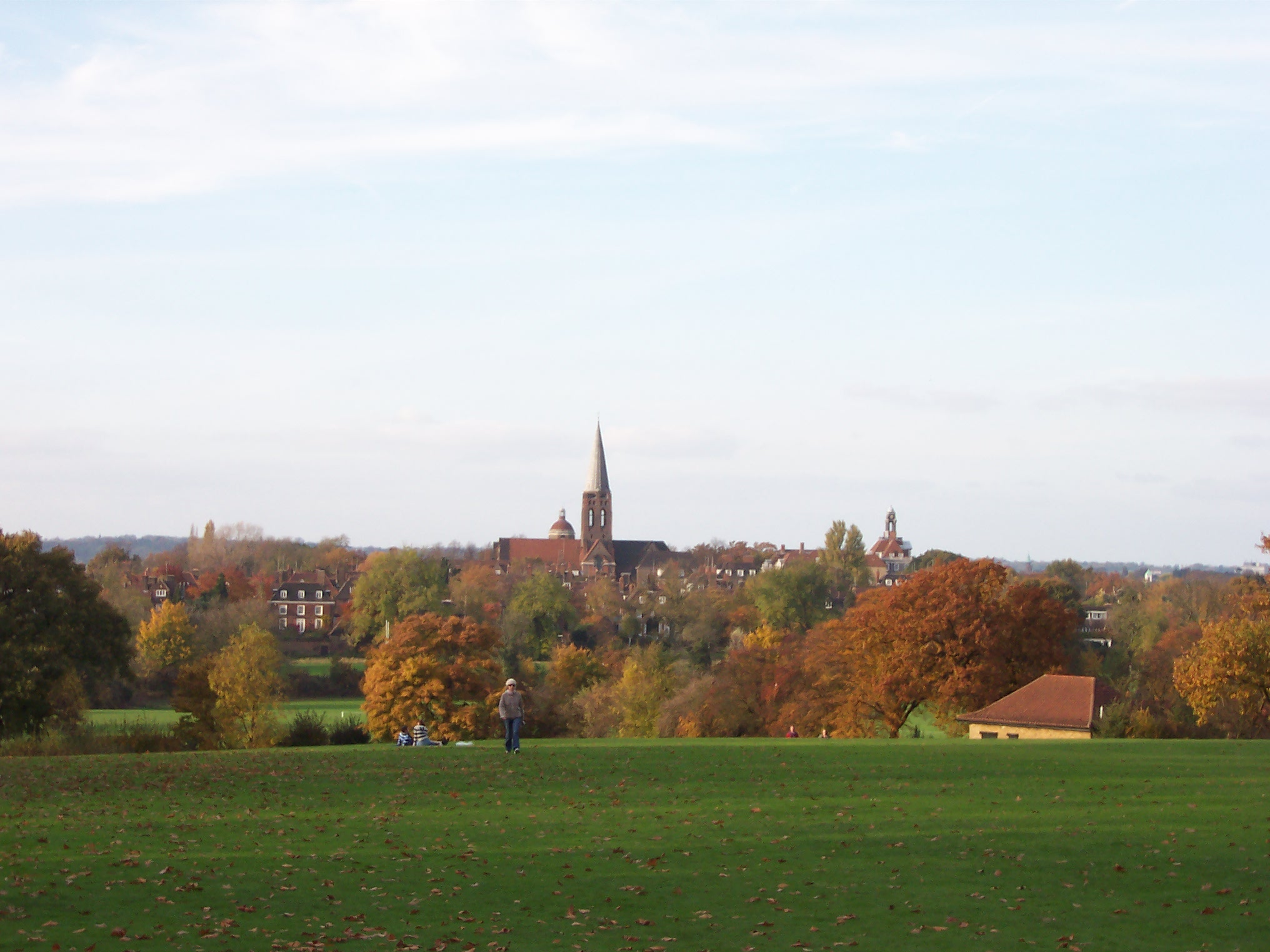
View towards St Jude's church in Hampstead Garden Suburb from the Heath extension
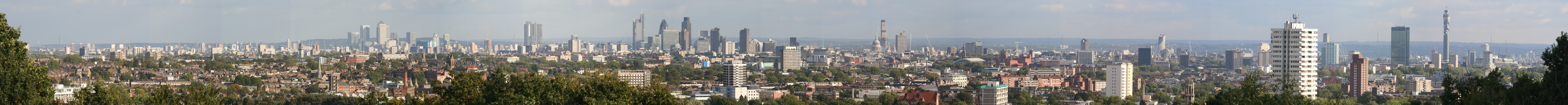
A panoramic image of London from Parliament Hill, late 2010 (the Shard can be seen under construction behind St Paul's Cathedral)

== See also ==
- List of Sites of Special Scientific Interest in Greater London
- Camden parks and open spaces
- Barnet parks and open spaces
- Nature reserves in Barnet

== Bibliography ==
- Bathurst, David (2012). Walking the county high points of England. Chichester: Summersdale. ISBN 978-1-84-953239-6.
- Fisher Unwin, T. (1913). Hampstead Heath: Its Geology and Natural History. London: Hampstead Scientific Society.
- Hewlett, Janet (1997). Nature Conservation in Barnet. London Ecology Unit. ISBN 1-871045-27-4.
- Thompson, F.M.L. (1974). Hampstead: building a borough, 1650-1964. London and Boston: Routledge & Kegan Paul. ISBN 0710077475.
- Weinreb, Ben; Hibbert, Christopher (2010). The London Encyclopaedia. Macmillan. ISBN 978-1405049252.
