= Ecosse Films =

British film and television production company

- Type: Private
- Industry: Films and television
- Genre: Documentaries; Docuseries
- Founded: 8 November 1988; 37 years ago
- Founder: Douglas Rae
- Headquarters: London, England, United Kingdom
- Key people: Douglas Rae (CEO and executive producer); Robert Bernstein (executive director); Matt Delargy (head of production)
- Products: Mrs Brown; Monarch of the Glen; Camelot; Hampstead; Charlotte Gray; Fleming: The Man Who Would Be Bond; The Trial of Christine Keeler
- Owner: Douglas Rae

Ecosse Films is a British film and television production company based in London. Ecosse Films produces programs for BBC, ITV, Channel 4, Showtime, Sky Atlantic, Starz Channel and WGBH.

== History ==
Ecosse Films was founded in November 1988 by Douglas Rae.

In 1997 Ecosse Films produced the film Mrs Brown, starring Judi Dench as Queen Victoria and Billy Connolly as her servant John Brown. Their most successful television production has been Monarch of the Glen, produced for BBC Scotland and screened on BBC One, which ran to seven series and chronicled events on a Scottish estate. Between 2008 and 2010 they have produced the BBC One series Mistresses.

Ecosse's international drama, Camelot, a 10 part series written by Michael Hurst and Chris Chibnall for Starz Channel and Channel 4 was broadcast in 2011. It stars Joseph Fiennes, Jamie Campbell Bower, Tamsin Egerton and Eva Green. Ecosse has also produced RTÉ's series Raw, set in a Dublin restaurant, with a fourth series in production.

Ecosse has produced films including; Charlotte Gray starring Cate Blanchett, Becoming Jane starring Anne Hathaway and James McAvoy, and Brideshead Revisited. The BAFTA nominated film Nowhere Boy, the teenage biopic of John Lennon directed by Sam Taylor-Wood premiered at the London Film Festival in 2009.

In 2011, Ecosse released The Decoy Bride, a romantic comedy about a famous celebrity wedding on a remote Scottish island and a local girl recruited to act as a decoy bride. Directed by Sheree Folkson, it starred David Tennant, Alice Eve and Kelly Macdonald. The same year they released Wuthering Heights directed by Andrea Arnold and starring Kaya Scodelario as Catherine Earnshaw and newcomer James Howson as Heathcliff. The world premiere was in competition at the 68th Venice International Film Festival.

In 2014, Ecosse produced Fleming: The Man Who Would Be Bond, a drama series featuring Dominic Cooper as Bond creator Ian Fleming, for Sky Atlantic HD. Also in 2014 the company released The Great Fire for ITV, a drama set during the Great Fire of London in 1666.

Ecosse released the drama film Hampstead in 2017, featuring Brendan Gleeson and Diane Keaton.

In December 2019 the BBC began broadcasting a 6-part drama series produced by Ecosse The Trial of Christine Keeler about the Profumo affair.

Ecosse's management includes founder Douglas Rae who remains executive-producer on all of Ecosse's films, company director and producer Robert Bernstein, and film development producer Matt Delargy.
