= Wise Up (TV programme) =

British children's television programme

Wise Up was a British factual children's television programme broadcast for nine series on Sunday mornings between 1995 and 2000 on Channel 4 (UK) and T4. It was produced by Carlton Productions, and was directed by Martin Wallace. As well as reports, there were also regular features such as a feature called Knowing Me, Knowing You. It was similar to a BBC programme called Ipso Facto.

In December 1999 there was an hour-long special called Wise Up: Teenagers on the Line in which a 15-year-old girl travelled from London to Paris and Bamako, Mali to explore teenage life in different countries each on the Greenwich Meridian Line.

== Production ==
The programme led to the formation of Wised Up Productions involving Mick Robertson and Simon Morris. Morris did not contribute to Wise Up, though he did contribute to the catalogue of programmes produced by Wised Up Productions.

== Reception ==
The programme was nominated for a BAFTA in 1996, a Children's BAFTA in 2000.

As part of the 25th Anniversary of Channel 4, Wise Up was featured in Radio Times.

=== Awards and nominations ===
| 1995 | 1996 | 1997 | 1998 |
|---|---|---|---|
| BAFTA | Nominated for Best Children's Programme – factual | Children's factual | Nominated for Best Children's Programme – factual |
| Emmy Award | Children & Young people | Children & Young people | Children & Young people |
| Peabody Award | | Award | |
| Prix Europa | Television Programme of the Year 1995 – Youth Category | SPECIAL COMMENDATIONS – Youth Category: | |
| Prix Jeunesse | | Award | |
| Royal Television Society | | Factual | |

== See also ==
- The Lowdown
- Why Don't You?
