= Rock On TV =

Ownership
- Owner: Eicom PLC

History
- Launched: 1 October 2008
- Replaced: Performance MainStreet
- Closed: 16 February 2009

Rock On TV was an arts and entertainment television channel broadcast in the United Kingdom, on the Sky platform. The channel launched on 1 October 2008 and it replaced Performance MainStreet when it closed down on 10 September 2008.

Rock On TV closed on 16 February 2009.
