= Susan Stranks =

British actress (born 1938)

- Born: 2 December 1938 (age 87); London, England
- Occupations: Actress, TVpresenter
- Spouse: Robin Ray (m. 1960; died 1998) (1 child)

Susan Stranks (born 2 December 1938) is a British actress, who started her career as a child film actress, before becoming a TV presenter.

== Career ==
=== Film ===
Stranks was born in London, England, when she was ten years old when she played the role of the younger Emmeline Foster in the romantic adventure film The Blue Lagoon (1949). She then played Janet Smith, the young sister of Ann Todd, in the David Lean film Madeleine (1950).

Stranks played a young student in the crime drama Sapphire (1959), and had a small part as a schoolgirl in the train scenes of The 39 Steps (also 1959) starring Kenneth More. Both roles were uncredited. She was also regular panellist on the TV pop music show Juke Box Jury, and also appeared in Emergency Ward 10.

=== TV presenter ===
She is best known for the children's TV series Magpie, which she co-presented from 1968 to 1974.

Following Magpie, Stranks devised and presented a programme for pre-school children, named Paperplay, which ran until 1981.

Stranks has since become a children's radio campaigner, helping to create Fun Radio, a station aimed at children aged under 10 years old.

== Personal life ==
Stranks was married to actor and media personality Robin Ray (son of comedian Ted Ray) from 1960 until his death in 1998. They had one child, Rupert.
