= Fleming: The Man Who Would Be Bond =

- Written by: John Brownlow; Don Macpherson
- Directed by: Mat Whitecross
- Starring: Dominic Cooper; Lara Pulver
- Composer: Ilan Eshkeri
- Country of origin: United Kingdom
- Original language: English
- No. of episodes: 4

Production
- Producers: Douglas Rae; Sarah Curtis
- Production company: Ecosse Films

Original release
- Network: BBC America; Sky Atlantic
- Release: 29 January – 19 February 2014

Fleming: The Man Who Would Be Bond is a 2014 British television miniseries of four instalments detailing the military career of James Bond creator Ian Fleming. The somewhat fictionalised biography spans the period from 1938 to 1952, dwelling on Fleming's romantic adventures as well as his espionage for the Royal Navy. Actor Dominic Cooper stars as Fleming, while Lara Pulver plays his love interest, Ann O'Neill.

== Cast ==
- Dominic Cooper as Ian Fleming
- Lara Pulver as Ann O'Neill
- Samuel West as Rear Admiral John Godfrey
- Anna Chancellor as Second Officer Monday
- Rupert Evans as Peter Fleming
- Lesley Manville as Evelyn Fleming
- Pip Torrens as Esmond Rothermere
- Annabelle Wallis as Muriel Wright
- Camilla Rutherford as Loelia Lindsay
- Tim Woodward as Bomber Harris
- Stanley Townsend as William J. Donovan
- Michael Maloney as Edmund Rushbrooke
- Aurélien Recoing as François Darlan

== Episodes ==
No.	Title	Directed by	Written by	Original release date
1	"Episode 1"	Mat Whitecross	John Brownlow & Don MacPherson	29 January 2014
In London, 1938, Ian Fleming is a dissolute playboy, eclipsed by his dead war hero father and successful brother.
2	"Episode 2"	Mat Whitecross	John Brownlow & Don MacPherson	5 February 2014
Lisbon 1940, neutral territory, the British mingle with Nazis. Fleming is with Godfrey and Monday on a diplomatic meeting.
3	"Episode 3"	Mat Whitecross	John Brownlow & Don MacPherson	12 February 2014
While training at a camp in Canada (Camp X), the Americans ask Fleming to use his talents to write a blueprint for the Office of Strategic Services (OSS).
4	"Episode 4"	Mat Whitecross	John Brownlow & Don MacPherson	19 February 2014
The war is nearly over, but Fleming is convinced the Nazis are hiding nuclear plans and that the British need to find them before the Russians.

== Release dates ==
The miniseries premiered on US television 29 January 2014, and on 12 February on UK television.

== Awards and nominations ==
Year	Award	Category	Nominee	Result
2014	66th Primetime Creative Arts Emmy Awards	Outstanding Cinematography for a Limited Series or Movie	Ed Wild	Nominated
2015	19th Satellite Awards	Best Miniseries or Television Film	Fleming: The Man Who Would Be Bond	Nominated
2015	19th Satellite Awards	Best Actor in a Miniseries or Television Film	Dominic Cooper	Nominated
