= Pete Brady (presenter) =

Canadian radio presenter, television presenter and company director

- Born: 1941 (age 84–85); Montreal, Quebec, Canada
- Occupations: Television presenter, businessman
- Spouse: Miranda Pearce

Pete Brady (born 1941) is a Canadian radio presenter, television presenter and company director who has worked in the United Kingdom for over 50 years. He was one of the original lineup of disc jockeys on the pirate radio station Radio London as well as BBC Radio 1 and was one of the original presenters of Magpie. He retired early from broadcasting to set up Clearwater Communications, a group of companies specialising in the production of major corporate events around the world.

Brady was born in Montreal and was heavily involved in radio during his teen years. He first joined Radio Jamaica as a stand-in presenter. In 1962, he moved to the UK, worked as an assistant producer on television commercials and in 1964 became the first voice on the pirate station Radio London, where he fronted the breakfast show. In 1965, he went freelance, and in 1966 he joined the Light Programme where he was heard presenting the daily afternoon show Midday Spin; at the same time he also hosted a record review show on Radio Luxembourg.

Following a similar path to DJs Tony Blackburn, Kenny Everett and Simon Dee, he made the natural progression to BBC Radio 1 at its launch in September 1967. Brady was given a major six-day-a-week afternoon slot Monday to Saturdays. He played a varied mix of current pop and rock music, new releases as well as big band, jazz and instrumental music. The second half of the show was also carried on BBC Radio 2.

In July 1968, he became one of the original presenters of Thames Television's new children's magazine programme, Magpie. He continued with Magpie until 1971, when he returned to radio for a short time before setting up his own production company. This enterprise grew over the years and became the Clearwater Communications Group which included Business Meetings Ltd and Crystal Clear Film and Video.
