= Magpie (TV series) =

British children's TV series (1968–1980)

- The Magpie logo.
- Genre: Children's; Entertainment
- Created by: Lewis Rudd; Sue Turner
- Presented by: Tony Bastable; Tommy Boyd; Pete Brady; Jenny Hanley; Douglas Rae; Mick Robertson; Susan Stranks
- Theme music composer: Eddie Hardin, Ray Fenwick & Spencer Davis
- Country of origin: United Kingdom
- Original language: English

Production
- Executive producers: Lewis Rudd; Sue Turner
- Running time: 25 minutes
- Production company: Thames Television

Original release
- Network: ITV
- Release: 30 July 1968 – 6 June 1980

Magpie is a British children's television programme shown on ITV from 30 July 1968 to 6 June 1980. It was a magazine format show, intended to compete with the BBC's Blue Peter, but it attempted to be more "hip", focusing more on popular culture. The show's creators, Lewis Rudd and Sue Turner, named the programme Magpie, as a reference to the magpie's habit of collecting small items and also because of "mag" being evocative of "magazine" and "pie" being evocative of a collection of ingredients.

== Broadcast history ==
The programme, made by Thames Television, was first transmitted on 30 July 1968, Thames Television's first day of broadcasting. It was shown weekly until 1969, after which, until it ended on 6 June 1980, it went out twice a week. It was not fully networked to all other ITV companies until the autumn of 1969. Approximately 1,000 episodes were made, each 25 minutes in duration.

The first presenters were the BBC Radio 1 disc jockey Pete Brady, Susan Stranks and Tony Bastable. Brady left the show in 1971 to be replaced by Douglas Rae, and Bastable left his presenting role to become the show's producer in 1972, being replaced by Mick Robertson. Jenny Hanley replaced Stranks in 1974. This lineup remained until 1977, when Tommy Boyd replaced Rae.

Like Blue Peter, Magpie featured appeals for various causes and charities. Unlike its rival programme, however, it asked for cash donations rather than stamps or secondhand goods, familiar on Blue Peter. The cash totaliser was a long strip of paper which ran out of the studio and along the adjacent corridor walls. Unlike the BBC programme, Magpie was unscripted and the presenters were free to improvise the presentation of the show.

The show's mascot was a magpie, who was named Murgatroyd in 1969. The name was chosen among four other after a viewer competition.

== Theme song ==
The theme tune was played by the Spencer Davis Group under the alias of The Murgatroyd Band, and composed by Eddie Hardin (lead voc., keyb.), Ray Fenwick (harm. voc., guit.) and Spencer Davis (harm. voc.guit.). The main lyric is an old children's nursery rhyme One for Sorrow:

One for sorrow
Two for joy
Three for a girl and
Four for a boy
Five for silver
Six for gold
Seven for a secret never to be told
Eight's a wish and
Nine a kiss
Ten is a bird you must not miss.

The rhyme refers to an old English superstition concerning the portent of the number of magpies seen together in a flock, and an older version of the ending runs:

Eight for Heaven
Nine for Hell
Ten for the Devil himself

== Steam engine and boat ==
In 1973, Magpie adopted a steam railway locomotive, "Black 5" 44806, which was given the name "Magpie" (Blue Peter already had a locomotive with the same name as that show). After an eventful history, it is still being used today on the North Yorkshire Moors Railway, although now with a different name.

Magpie also adopted a boat, originally called "Mankadu" and renamed "Thames Magpie". Its current whereabouts are unknown.
