= Cimarron Strip =

1967 American television series

- Genre: Western
- Created by: Christopher Knopf
- Starring: Stuart Whitman
- Theme music composer: Maurice Jarre
- Country of origin: United States
- Original language: English
- No. of seasons: 1
- No. of episodes: 23

Production
- Executive producer: Philip Leacock
- Producers: Douglas Benton; Bernard McEveety; Stuart Whitman (uncredited)
- Cinematography: Monroe P. Askins; Harry Stradling Jr.
- Editors: Donald W. Ernst; Jack Kampschroer; Danny B. Landres; Howard A. Smith
- Running time: 72 mins

Original release
- Network: CBS
- Release: September 7, 1967 – March 7, 1968

Cimarron Strip is an American Western television series starring Stuart Whitman as Marshal Jim Crown. The series was produced by the creators of Gunsmoke and aired on CBS from September 1967 to March 1968. Reruns of the original show were aired in the summer of 1971. Cimarron Strip is one of only three 90-minute weekly Western series that aired during the 1960s (the others are The Virginian, and for one season, Wagon Train), and the only 90-minute series of any kind from that period to be centered primarily around one lead character in almost every episode. The series theme and pilot incidental music were written by Maurice Jarre, who also scored Lawrence of Arabia and Doctor Zhivago.

The series is set in the late 1880s in the Cimarron Territory, which became the Oklahoma Panhandle in 1890. For complex historical reasons, this rugged strip of land existed as a virtually ungoverned U.S. territory for several decades. It was sometimes called No Man's Land, with a reputation for lawlessness and vigilante activity. On the show, Marshal Jim Crown is trying to bring order to the region before its political status is finally resolved.

== Plot outline ==
The Cherokee Outlet across the Cimarron River was the last free homestead land in America. It was leased and controlled by cattlemen, and the newly arriving farmers were expecting authorities in Washington to send news that they would be given rights to the land, for which they had been campaigning. U.S. Marshal Jim Crown (Stuart Whitman), who led a rather wild life and had cleaned up Abilene, was assigned to the town of Cimarron. He arrives to find that the sheriff has resigned, leaving Crown on his own to settle the increasing unrest caused by the news he brings, that the cattlemen's leases have been revoked and a final decision on the land is postponed indefinitely. With no sheriff and no support from Army troops, Crown is on his own to keep law and order in this borderland between the Kansas Territory and Indian Territory.

Dulcey Coopersmith (Jill Townsend), born in England in 1869, arrives in Cimarron City on the same train as Marshal Crown, two months after her mother's death in Providence. Dulcey worked as an upstairs maid and traveled to Cimarron to be with her father, whom she had not seen since the age of five, only to discover he had been killed by a beer wagon. Her father's partner was MacGregor (Percy Herbert), a Scotsman, who had let the Wayfarer's Inn fall into disrepair. He was a retired colonel in Her Majesty's (Queen Victoria) forces. Another of Dulcey's father's friends was Francis Wilde (Randy Boone), born in St. Louis and trying to make his way in the world as a reporter and photographer.

Crown wears a U.S. Marshal badge that is seen in close-up in the show's opening title sequence. MacGregor, Francis, and another character are seen in various episodes wearing a Deputy U.S. Marshals badge. The badge with that wording is shown in a close camera angle in the episode "The Deputy".

In the original flashback episode "The Battleground", Dulcey tells Marshal Crown her age is 18. Crown says he is 35.

In the episode "Nobody", Dulcey describes MacGregor as her business partner in the Wayfarer's Inn and decisions regarding its operation are shared responsibilities.

== Cast ==
=== Regular ===
- Stuart Whitman as Marshal Jim Crown
- Jill Townsend as Dulcey Coopersmith
- Percy Herbert as MacGregor
- Randy Boone as Francis Wilde

=== Recurring ===
- Jack Braddock as Fabrizio the bartender of the Wayfarers Inn (seven episodes)
- Andrew Duggan as Major Ben Covington of the nearest Army fort (three episodes)
- Warren Oates as Mobeetie, a cowboy (two episodes)
- Karl Swenson as Doctor Kihlgren (six episodes)
- Robert J. Wilke as Hardy Miller (two episodes)

Several actors appeared in more than one episode playing a different character each time. For example, Al Wyatt Sr. played five different episodic characters, and those who played three different characters in three separate episodes include Gregg Palmer and Morgan Woodward. It was not unusual for actors to be recast in Westerns at that time, however.

== Production notes ==
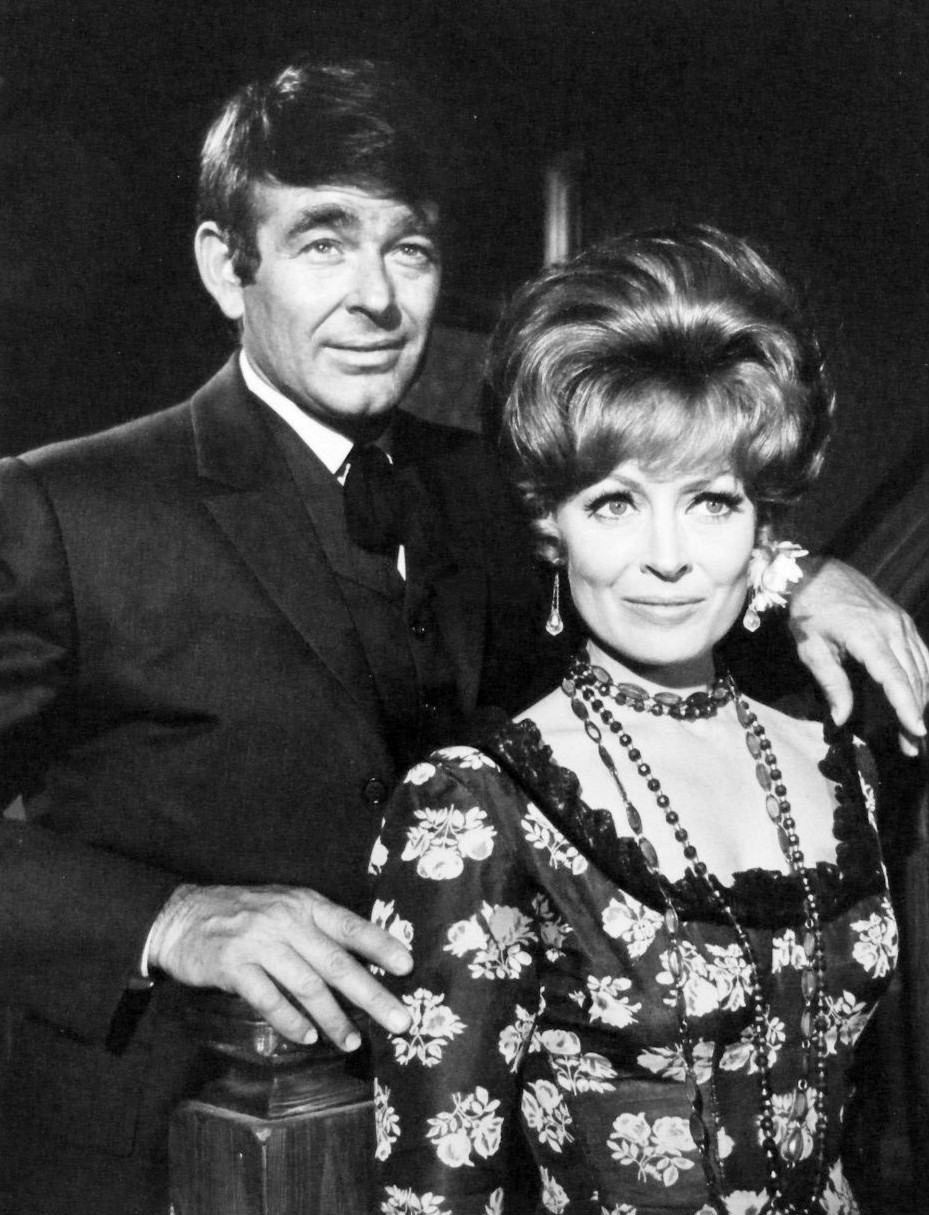
Whitman and Victoria Shaw in episode 18, "Knife in the Darkness", written by Harlan Ellison

Cimarron Strip was created by Christopher Knopf, who also served as supervising producer. Philip Leacock was executive producer. The series was produced in association with the Stuart Whitman Corporation (Stuart Whitman, Inc. on later episodes).

Set in Oklahoma, the series was shot at CBS Studio Center in Studio City, Los Angeles. Other shooting locations included the Alabama Hills near Lone Pine, California; Bishop, California; Kanab, Utah; and Tucson, Arizona.

Science-fiction writer Harlan Ellison wrote episode 18, "Knife in the Darkness", featuring a murderer who may or may not be Jack the Ripper, and has an incidental music score by Bernard Herrmann, famous for his Citizen Kane and Alfred Hitchcock movie soundtracks. In a sartorial departure, Stuart Whitman wore a full suit through most of the episode, accentuating the fog-enshrouded Londonesque atmosphere.

Cimarron Strip aired on Thursdays opposite ABC's The Flying Nun, Batman, Bewitched, NBC's Daniel Boone, and Ironside. By the time the series premiered, there were only two remaining Westerns on television. Due to low ratings, the series was cancelled after one season.

Stuart Whitman as Marshal Jim Crown was featured on the November 4, 1967 cover of TV Guide.

== Episodes ==
No.	Title	Directed by	Written by	Original release date	Prod. code
1	"Journey to a Hanging"	Vincent McEveety	Story by : Mel Goldberg and Jack Curtis; Teleplay by : Jack Curtis	September 7, 1967	0707
Ace Coffin, a bank robber, comes to Cimarron City, kills his associate in the town jail, and escapes with the help of his gang. Screamer, who was in the adjacent cell, offers to help U.S. Marshal Jim Crown and his posse of Francis Wilde and MacGregor to track down Coffin and his gang. In the pursuit, MacGregor is wounded and Francis has to take him back to Cimarron. Crown is left alone with Screamer when they receive unexpected assistance from some of Coffin's disillusioned gang members, who along with Screamer, are motivated by the fugitive's $10,000 bounty. The episode guest-stars Gregg Palmer, John Saxon, and Henry Silva.
2	"The Legend of Jud Starr"	Vincent McEveety	Richard Fielder	September 14, 1967	0702
Jud Starr, an outlaw made infamous by the newspapers for robbing an Army payroll of $80,000, is to be hanged, but his gang rescues him, and they disappear into the Cherokee Outlet. With the Army's refusal to act because of a possible Indian uprising, Crown heads to the outlet with MacGregor and Francis. Starr is protected by the Cherokees, who want a share of the money he hid on their land, but Crown finds help from an unexpected source. The episode guest-stars Darren McGavin and Beau Bridges.
3	"Broken Wing"	Sam Wanamaker	Harold Swanton	September 21, 1967	0706
Jing McQueen, the son of a wealthy cattleman, shoots a preacher and burns down a livery stable in a drunken spree. Although Crown arrests Jing, the Cimarron citizens want further action. This is fueled by saloon keeper Kilgallen and gunslinger Wiley Harpe, who had originally conspired for Harpe to become marshal before Crown took over. The preacher recovers, but refuses to press charges, so Jing is released. Kilgallen and Harpe convince the citizens that Crown and the preacher have sold out to Jing's father Mike, who refuses to accept that his only son has mental issues. They organize a lynch mob, and it is up to Crown to stop them. The episode guest-stars Pat Hingle and Steve Forrest.
4	"The Battleground"	Don Medford	Christopher Knopf	September 28, 1967	0701
Dulcey finds a magazine she was reading on the train bringing her to Cimarron City, and remembers when she first met fellow passenger Marshal Jim Crown, who was assigned to keep the peace between farmers and cattlemen and prevent encroachment into the Cherokee Outlet. Cattle boss Miller, who has had his lease revoked, fires his workers knowing their leader Bear will cause trouble and turn the Cimarron River bloody red. Guest stars are Telly Savalas, Warren Oates, and Andrew Duggan. This was the pilot episode.
5	"The Hunted"	Alvin Ganzer	Richard Fielder	October 5, 1967	0717
Crown wants the Gauge brothers Felix and Gene to surrender themselves and seek a fair trial, but they deny committing many of the crimes for which they are accused. A wealthy rancher named Buckman seeks his own form of justice for his dead son by hiring bounty hunters to go after the brothers. The episode guest-stars David Carradine, Dennis Cross, and James Gregory.
6	"The Battle of Bloody Stones"	Richard C. Sarafian	Jack Curtis	October 12, 1967	0705
Wildcat Gallagher brings his Wild West Show to Cimarron. The show's main event is an reenactment of the Battle of Bloody Stones, in which many Indians were killed by the U.S. Cavalry. This offends three of the local Indians, including John Wolf, whose father survived that battle. Their complaints lead to a fight in which John is injured and the fighters are jailed. Crown orders Gallagher to take his show elsewhere, but when he refuses, the violence between the showmen and the Indians escalates. The episode guest-stars Michael J. Pollard and Elisha Cook Jr.
7	"Whitey"	Herschel Daugherty	Dan Ullman	October 19, 1967	0711
Arn Tinker's gang robs the Cimarron Railway station, and are pursued by Crown and a posse. Gang member Whitey is arrested and tricked by Crown into revealing the plans for Tinker's next robbery. Crown gathers a group of lawmen for an ambush, but Tinker has given Whitey false information, and robs a bank in a different town. When Crown returns to Cimarron City, he discovers Whitey has escaped and has kidnapped Dulcey. The episode guest-stars Peter Kastner.
8	"The Roarer"	Lamont Johnson	William Wood	November 2, 1967	0703
Cavalryman Little Tom is killed when his horse trips over a fallen telegraph wire and he hits his head on a steel rail. Sergeant Bill Disher takes Tom's body into town, and interrupts a meeting of Joe Wyman of the citizen's committee, which is demanding action against the Army. When Disher's group comes to retrieve the body, things get out of hand, as the soldiers burn the parlor and nearby buildings. Although Major Covington has the soldiers put in the stockade, Disher escapes, trashes a telegraph line, and is about to damage a railroad track when he is spotted by a townsman, whom he kills. Crown arrests Disher, but must get him out of town before Wyman sets his vigilante group against them. Although Disher escapes from Crown, Covington dismisses him from the Army, which leaves him to fend for himself against Crown and Wyman's group. The episode guest-stars Richard Boone, Robert Duvall, Andrew Duggan, Med Flory, and Ed Flanders.
9	"The Search"	Bernard McEveety	Story by : Herman Miller and William Wood; Teleplay by : William Wood	November 9, 1967	0712
Crown has to transport Dickie Vardeman, who was arrested for murder, to Hayes City. He plans to go by train with MacGregor and Francis, and plans to trick Vardeman's brothers Lou and Kerwin, but the deception goes wrong when the brothers ambush him. Crown kills Lou, but is shot by Kerwin, who reports back to his father, Clo, and brother, Strawdy, that Crown is dead. When the Vardemans return, they cannot find Crown's body. Dulcey tries to get help from the Cimarron townsmen, while the Vardemans offer a bounty for Crown. The episode guest-stars Joseph Cotten and Jim Davis.
10	"Till the End of Night"	Alvin Ganzer	Hal Sitowitz	November 16, 1967	0713
MacGregor and Francis are left in charge of the prisoner Luther Happ, but when Happ escapes, MacGregor tracks him alone into Texas. He manages to shoot him, but is wounded. He is taken to Cedar County, but its sheriff, Jack Hawkes, arrests MacGregor for the murder of Happ, who happens to be Hawkes's deputy. At a hastily arranged kangaroo court, MacGregor is sentenced to be hung, and is put in a prison wagon with a female prisoner, Sarah Lou Burke. MacGregor and Burke escape at a water hole, but must make their way back to Cimarron City while chained together and pursued by Hawkes. The episode guest-stars Suzanne Pleshette.
11	"The Beast That Walks Like a Man"	Charles R. Rondeau	Story by : Stephen Kandel; Teleplay by : Stephen Kandel and Richard Fielder	November 30, 1967	0709
Crown and MacGregor pursue farmer Waly Daggett, who has illegally crossed the Cimarron River to stake a claim. MacGregor discovers Daggett's mutilated body at the mouth of the Mocane Valley. The Houston family does not want to wait for government approval to stake their land claim. Crown arrests and jails the family leader Rowan, but the rest of the family, led by Stacey Houston, breaks him out of jail and crosses into the Mocane Valley. Crown with Francis, MacGregor, and part-Pawnee Indian Walking Man must try to stop them from suffering a similar fate. The episode guest-stars Lola Albright and Leslie Nielsen.
12	"Nobody"	Boris Sagal	Story by : Ellis Marcus and John D. F. Black; Teleplay by : Ellis Marcus	December 7, 1967	0715
Burke Stegman and his gang try to rob a wagon, but he is arrested by Crown. However, at the trial, Judge Quayle releases him, as the victims, under intimidation, have left town. Mobeetie causes trouble by riding his horse through the Wayfarer's Inn window, and then botches a task where he is to help Crown unload a train wagon of unstable dynamite, but accidentally injures MacGregor. Crown sends Mobeetie away. Feeling unwanted, Mobeetie joins Stegman's gang to rob the Cimarron Bank, and is tricked into trying to kill Crown. Warren Oates reprises his role as Mobeetie.
13	"The Last Wolf"	Bernard McEveety	Preston Wood	December 14, 1967	0708
Sam Gallatin, the leader of a band of wolf hunters, becomes a problem for the locals when no more wolves remain to hunt. Crown offers him a job as an army scout, but Gallatin joins his fellow hunters at a squatters camp, and they kill some of the local cattle. After the cattlemen fight back, Crown offers Gallatin a settlement at a homestead, but when Gallatin prefers to become an outlaw instead of a farmer, Crown fears the worst. The episode guest-stars Read Morgan, Albert Salmi, John M. Pickard, and Denver Pyle.
14	"The Deputy"	Alvin Ganzer	Hal Sitowitz	December 21, 1967	0714
In 1880, at Fort Concho, Texas, an armored army wagon with the soldiers' payroll is ambushed by a gang led by Tate Hansen. Hansen's man, Bo Woodard, is caught in a dynamite explosion, and is left for dead by the gang. Eight-and-a-half years later, he swipes the papers from a Texas deputy he killed, and gets a job with Crown's group. While Crown is away in Kansas City, Woodard seeks revenge on his former partners, who have settled in Cimarron. His killings seem to be self-defense, but MacGregor is uneasy about the deaths. The episode guest-stars J. D. Cannon and Gregg Palmer.
15	"The Judgement"	Robert Butler	Dan Ullman	January 4, 1968	0716
In the town of Hardesty, which is 40 miles west of Cimarron City, a trail boss, Joe Bravo, tries to cash a $500 check, but the bank refuses, as none of the group can provide proper identification. Bravo's men take over the bank, which has $100,000 in the vault. Although Bravo's comrade Lloyd Emmet wants to steal the money, Bravo fires him and removes only the $500. Although Crown later arrests the gang when they celebrate, he recognizes Bravo as an old friend. Bravo is not put on trial, but the other cowboys are sentenced to hard labor. When the judge learns that Bravo is given a deputy-sheriff position at Hardesty, he releases the other five cowboys, hoping they will travel to Hardesty and cause trouble. Emmet tries to recruit the cowboys to steal the money. The episode guest-stars James Stacy, I. Stanford Jolley, and Don Keefer.
16	"Fool's Gold"	Herschel Daugherty	Story by : Palmer Thompson and David Jones; Teleplay by : Palmer Thompson	January 11, 1968	0721
A train drops an army payroll of $56,000 for Crown's group to guard. Sam Darcy and his band of outlaws plan to steal the money. They set up Bob Mahoney, nicknamed the Kid, to carry dynamite and fool's gold. Crown arrests the Kid, but cannot connect him to the gang. Crown and his group catch Darcy and the gang at a horse ranch, thanks to owner Malachi Grimes. Darcy is sent to territorial prison for 10 years' hard labor. Crown releases the Kid to go work for Grimes, but Darcy escapes and tries to enlist the Kid to get revenge on Crown and Grimes. The episode guest-stars Robert Lansing and Slim Pickens.
17	"Heller"	Gunnar Hellstrom	Austin Kalish and Irma Kalish	January 18, 1968	0718
Logan Purcell and his gang have been raiding Indian villages outside of Cimarron, but when they shoot an Indian in Cimarron City, Crown pursues them. Crown is wounded in a shootout, but is aided by a young girl named Heller. She explains that she had been taken by Indians when she was a baby but was rescued by Purcell, and she now minds a horse ranch. Crown and she flee to Cimarron City when Purcell sends someone to look for her. Crown and his posse try to get help from the Indians to find Purcell. The episode guest-stars Tuesday Weld as Heller.
18	"Knife in the Darkness"	Charles R. Rondeau	Harlan Ellison	January 25, 1968	0704
Foggy nights at Cimarron City bring the murders of two women. Francis points out the similarities to the killings in London by Jack the Ripper, and a trail of murders across the United States. Tipton, a visitor from Britain, claims to be a Jack the Ripper expert, and suspects the murderer is in Cimarron. Crown must find the killer in the fog before the town goes into a panic. The episode guest-stars Tom Skerritt and was scripted by legendary science-fiction writer Harlan Ellison.
19	"Sound of a Drum"	Gerald Mayer	Story by : Victor Leslie Tracey; Teleplay by : Victor Leslie Tracey and A.L. Christopher	February 1, 1968	0720
Crown and the army are having difficulty tracking down cattle rustlers. Cavalry veteran Sergeant Clayton Tyce finds himself in conflict with new Sergeant Major Chambers. When Tyce goes into Cimarron City instead of on patrol, the captain in charge of the fort tells him he must be discharged or face a court-martial. Although Tyce accepts the discharge, he later set up a mock trial for Chambers, and uses his former comrades as the jury, where they hold court at the Wayfarer's Inn. While Crown and the gang continue to search for the rustlers, Dulcey tries to defend Chambers from being hanged. The episode guest-stars Steve Forrest.
20	"Big Jessie"	Herschel Daugherty	Dan Mainwaring	February 8, 1968	0719
Crown prepares to take young Bud Baylor (Eddie Hodges), who is wanted for robbery and murder, to Silver City, New Mexico. Bud tricks Dulcey into sending a cryptic message to his older brother Bill (Donnelly Rhodes), who, along with his partner Lobo (Timothy Carey), ambushes Crown and knocks him unconscious. "Big Jessie" Cabot (Mariette Hartley), the beautiful owner of a run-down freight business, helps Crown, but he has lost his U.S. marshal identification badge. As a result, he is mistaken for Bill, who is wanted for the murder of an Indian Wells blacksmith. He is pursued by a lynch-mob posse and a bounty hunter named Moon (Jack Elam) who wants to take him to Silver City to claim the reward, and must rely on Big Jessie for help.
21	"The Blue Moon Train"	Gerald Mayer	Jack Curtis	February 15, 1968	0710
Joe Lehigh, a former convict, visits Cimarron City and works at the Wayfarer's Inn. Crown is concerned that he may be involved in springing the convicts from the Blue Moon Train, which is a prison train traveling from Denver to Atlanta. He puts Lehigh in jail, but Lehigh escapes and kidnaps Francis. Crown and MacGregor pursue, but they are ambushed by Lehigh. Crown continues to pursue Lehigh alone to the ghost town of Lucre, where Lehigh demands he help stop the passing Blue Moon Train to release his gang members. The episode guest-stars Broderick Crawford and Don "Red" Barry.
22	"Without Honor"	Robert Butler	Dan Ullman	February 29, 1968	0722
Three soldiers arrive in Cimarron City to join the nearby Cimarron cavalry post. One of the soldiers, Private Bill Mason, causes trouble and is jailed by Crown. The next day, Major Ben Covington picks Mason up, but is not aware that Mason is actually his son, whom he abandoned after birth. Mason gets in a fight with an officer, which gets him locked in the stockade. Covington learns Mason's true identity, but Mason escapes the prison fort, and joins a gang of army deserters led by George Deeker. With his knowledge of explosives taught to him by the army, Mason impresses Deeker, and the gang steals a safe from the Wells Fargo office in Hardesty, robs a freight office in Shade's Wells, and blows a hole in a mail train roof. Convington asks Crown to help search for him. The episode guest-stars Andrew Duggan as Major Ben Covington and Jon Voight as Bill Mason.
23	"The Greeners"	Vincent McEveety	Hal Sitowitz	March 7, 1968	0723
Crown kicks two drifters out of town for disturbing the saloon. The Arlyn family, led by patriarch Jared, who are "greeners" (travelers who come to Cimarron to farm), observe four horsemen drag the two men and then later find that the two men have been hanged. The family takes the bodies to Cimarron, but because they did not witness the hanging, Jared refuses to testify and cites his religious convictions as his reasons. Crown, MacGregor, and tracker Charles Ives search for the horsemen, and arrest rancher Turner and his three cowhands when they threaten to drag Ives. Jared's son Arlyn blackmails Turner so he can buy a farm next to Turner's ranch, but his father learns of the scheme. The episode guest-stars Mark Lenard, Dub Taylor, and Gregg Palmer.

== Home media ==
On May 27, 2014, Entertainment One released the complete series on DVD in Region 1.

== Syndication ==
UK digital network 5Spike used to air episodes of the show at random days and random times, as movies. Previously, the show aired on Movies4Men, now known as Great! Action. US over-the-air network Decades also aired episodes of the show for one day in October 2015. It also briefly aired on Superstation WGN for a short time in the early 2000s.

== Bibliography ==
- Tim Brooks and Earle Marsh, The Complete Directory to Prime Time Network and Cable TV Shows 1946–Present, Ninth edition (New York: Ballantine Books, 2007) ISBN 978-0-345-49773-4
