= Sony Channel =

Pay television channel (launched 1995)

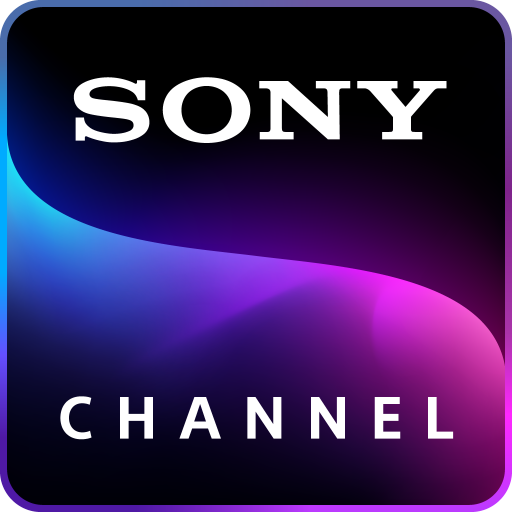
- Broadcast area: Latin America
- Headquarters: Constellation Place, Los Angeles, California, U.S.

Programming
- Picture format: 16:9 HDTV

Ownership
- Owner: Sony Pictures Television

History
- Launched: October 1, 1995

Links
- Website: https://www.sonychannel.com/

Sony Channel is a brand of general entertainment television channels, owned by Sony Pictures Television. It was previously known as Sony Entertainment Television (SET), but many of the channels, except the Indian television channel Sony Entertainment Television, were rebranded as Sony Channel.

== Current channels ==
Market	Type	Former names	Replaced	Launched	Other Countries
Sony Channel (Latin America)	channel	Sony Entertainment Television; Canal Sony	—N/a	October 1, 1995	—N/a
Sony Channel (Latin America)	channel	Sony Entertainment Television; Canal Sony	—N/a	March 1, 1996	Mexico
Sony Channel (Latin America)	channel	Sony Entertainment Television; Canal Sony	—N/a	September 4, 1996	Brazil; Colombia; Argentina; Peru; South America

== Defunct channels ==
Market	Type	Former names	Replaced	Active Date	Other Countries	Fate
Sony Channel (South Africa)	channel	Sony Entertainment Television	—N/a	November 2, 2007 - March 1, 2019	—N/a	Due to Sony Pictures Television's contract failure with MultiChoice and Cell C
Sony Channel (Southeast Asia)	channel	Sony Entertainment Television	—N/a	August 1, 2008 - June 1, 2019	Singapore; Malaysia; Hong Kong	Selected programmes moved to AXN following the channel's closure. Replaced by Blue Ant Entertainment on Cignal
Sony Channel (Southeast Asia)	channel	Sony Entertainment Television	—N/a	August 1, 2008 - May 31, 2019	Indonesia; Thailand	Selected programmes moved to AXN following the channel's closure. Replaced by Blue Ant Entertainment on Cignal
Sony Channel (Southeast Asia)	channel	—N/a	BeTV (Asia Pacific)	October 15, 2014 - June 1, 2019	Philippines	Selected programmes moved to AXN following the channel's closure. Replaced by Blue Ant Entertainment on Cignal
Sony Channel (Russia)	channel	Sony Entertainment Television (Sony Channel); Sony Turbo; Sony Sci-fi	.red; .black; .sci-fi	October 1, 2008 - June 24, 2021	Ukraine; Belarus; CIS Countries	Closed due to Sony's decision to leave the Russian Markets.
Sony Channel (Baltics)	channel	Sony Entertainment Television	Duo 3	June 1, 2010 - March 30, 2021	Latvia; Lithuania; Estonia	Sony decided to leave from Baltic States market.
Sony Channel (UK and Ireland)	channel	Sony Entertainment Television (Original); N/A (Relaunch)	Film24 (Original); True Entertainment (Relaunch)	Original; April 7, 2011 - February 6, 2018; Relaunch; September 10, 2019 - May 25, 2021	—N/a	Original; Replaced by Sony Crime Channel on Sky and Virgin Media; Relaunch; License sold by Sony to Narrative Capital Partners LLC, along with the other Sony Channels to rebrand as "GREAT!"
Sony Channel (UK and Ireland)	channel +1	Sony Entertainment Television (Original); N/A (Relaunch)	Open Access 3 (Original); True Entertainment +1 (Relaunch)	Original; April 7, 2011 - February 6, 2018; Relaunch; September 10, 2019 - May 25, 2021		Original; Replaced by Sony Crime Channel on Sky and Virgin Media; Relaunch; License sold by Sony to Narrative Capital Partners LLC, along with the other Sony Channels to rebrand as "GREAT!"
Sony Channel (Germany)	channel	Sony Entertainment Television	—N/a	April 22, 2013 - August 31, 2023	Austria; Switzerland; Luxembourg	License sold by Sony to High View Group, along with Sony AXN. Rebranding to AXN White
Sony Channel (Turkey)	channel	—N/a	Planet Pink	March 28, 2017 - February 1, 2019	Northern Cyprus; Azerbaijan	License revoked by Sony Pictures Television along with the other Sony Channels

== Former logos ==
Sony Entertainment Television logo used from 1995–2007

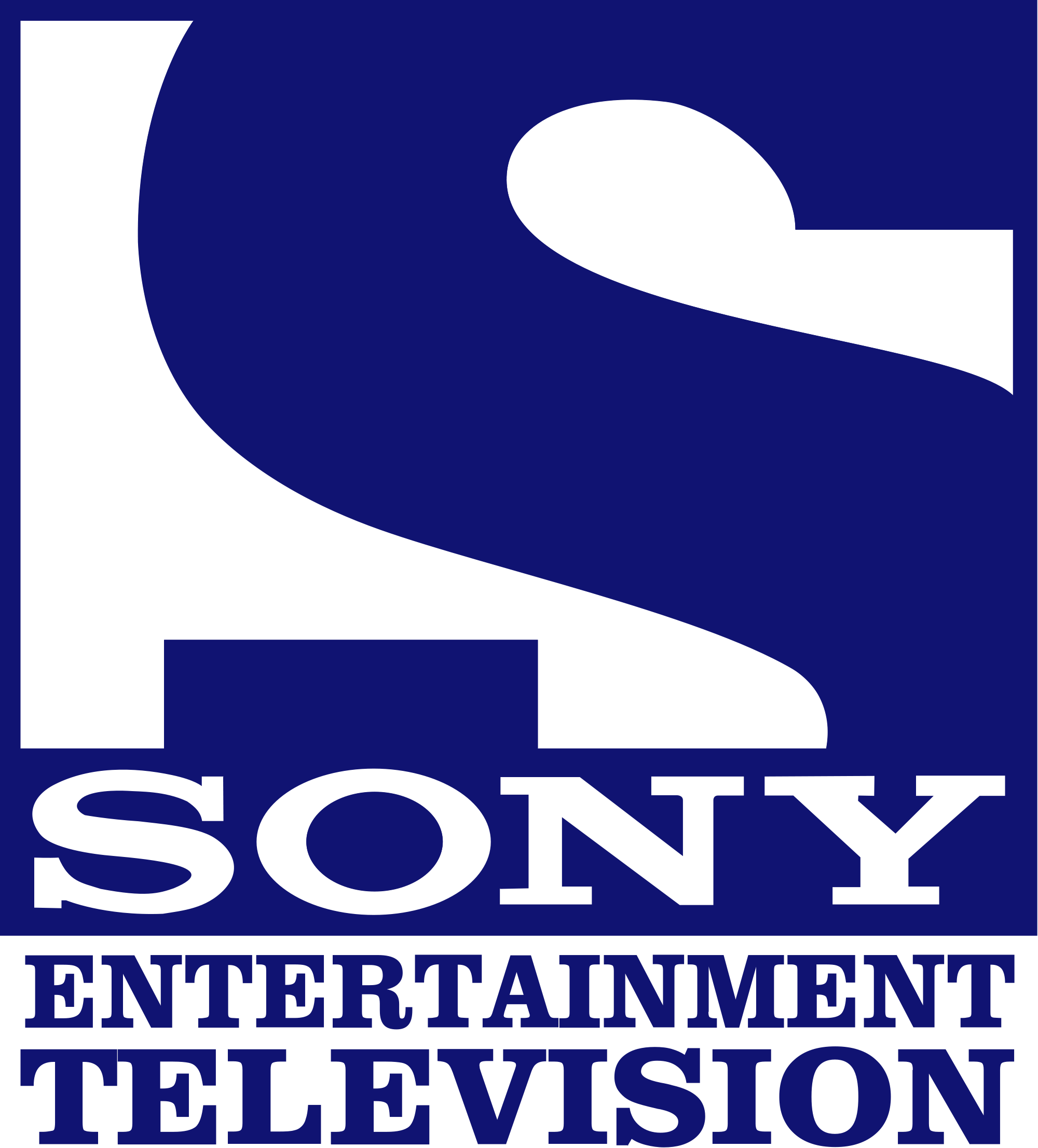
Sony Entertainment Television logo used from 2007–2014

Sony Channel logo used from 2014–2019

Sony Channel logo used from 2016–2019

== See also ==
- AXN White, a channel operated by Sony Pictures Television International Networks Europe
