= Cyriak =

British musical artist

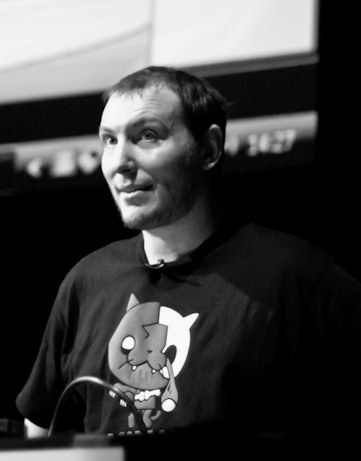
- Cyriak in 2010
- Born: Cyriak Harris; 19 September 1974 (age 52); Brighton, England
- Other names: Cyriak Harris; Mutated Monty; Mouldy
- Occupations: Animator; composer
- Years active: 2004–present

YouTube information
- Channel: cyriak
- Years active: 2006–present
- Genres: animation; music; surrealism
- Subscribers: 3.09 million (combined)
- Views: 1.008 billion (combined)
- Musical career
- Genre: Electronic
- Label: None
- Last updated: 28 August 2026
- Website: cyriak.co.uk

Cyriak Harris (born 19 September 1974), known mononymously as Cyriak (/ˈsɪriæk/), his B3ta username Mutated Monty, and Mouldy in the Doom community, is an English freelance animator, artist, composer and author from Brighton. He is known for his surreal and bizarre short web animations with the frequent use of the Droste effect.

== Animations ==
Cyriak has been a regular contributor to the British website B3ta since 2004. His YouTube channel was launched in March 2006.

Cyriak's YouTube account features a compilation of his animations, which have been popular throughout the blogosphere and noted by Wired's Eliot Van Buskirk. Most of his videos are made with Adobe After Effects and FL Studio. Cyriak's animation "MOO" has featured on the front page of Wired. His 2009 video "poo pants" features an animated sample of broadcaster Alan Titchmarsh singing a repeated refrain (a pitch-shifted excerpt from children's music artist Ann Austin's "The Poo Song") from the bowls of a series of toilets, some of which fly through space.

As a freelance animator, he has been commissioned by the video sharing website Sumo TV, and a music video for Grand Popo Football Club, among others.

Cyriak made the "Spaceology" animation in the third episode of the fourth season of the TV series The IT Crowd and the "Goth to Boss" animation in the sixth episode. In 2015 he created the opening credits for the Netflix series W/ Bob & David.

Cyriak has directed a number of music videos, including videos for Bonobo's "Cirrus" and Bloc Party's "Ratchet" in 2013, Flying Lotus's "Putty Boy Strut" in 2014, Run the Jewels’s "Meowpurrdy" in 2016, and Sparks' "The Existential Threat" in 2020. His videos "Baaa" and "meow mix" have amassed more than 100 million views. Other popular uploads on his channel include "Welcome to Kitty City," "Cycles," and "7 billion."

== Music and other activities ==
Long before Harris started creating animations, he composed a considerable amount of surreal music.

On 19 August 2008, Harris uploaded a music video of the song "My Territory" by Grand Popo Football Club. It features a landscape that has been made entirely out of a woman's body, and is a metaphor for consumerism and the treatment of the female body. On 9 September 2009, British illusionist Derren Brown, live on UK television, claimed to predict the National Lottery numbers. Cyriak uploaded a possible explanation, to his YouTube channel, which gained half a million views within a week and attention from national press. In September 2010 he appeared at "Flash on the Beach" in Brighton and in September 2014 appeared at "Reasons to be Creative", also in Brighton.

In December 2013, he released the mod "Going Down" for the 1994 first-person shooter Doom II.

In March 2018, he started working on a partly crowd-funded book Horse Destroys the Universe. The book was published in September 2019. It is about scientists who experiment on a horse named Buttercup, causing it to become a super-intelligence. The escalating conflict between one of the scientists and Buttercup eventually causes the destruction of the universe.

On 8 February 2020, Cyriak showcased his music for the first time, as he performed as a disc jockey at the Zanzibar Club in Liverpool.

In August 2022, he released another Doom II mod titled "Overboard".

== Awards and recognition ==
On 3 December 2009, Cyriak was announced as the winner of the 2009 E Stings competition, run by television channel E4, with £5,000 for his video Recursive Culture.

In 2006, he also received a special mention in the results of a Photoshop contest run by the technology series Click.

In 2012 and 2014, he was awarded with two Cacowards, an annual online awards ceremony which honours the year's most prominent modifications of Doom, being recognized for his outstanding level design and sophisticated technical approach to achieving complex sequences and impressive comedic timing.

In 2022, he was awarded with another Cacoward for his mod "Overboard", which was praised for its silliness and fast-paced gameplay.

== McDonald's advertisement feud ==
In 2016, Cyriak accused fast food chain McDonald's of plagiarizing his animated video "cows & cows & cows". The studio that animated the advertisement, Buenos Aires-based Juan Solo, openly admitted that they used Cyriak's work as "reference". After Cyriak's tweets about the theft went viral, the advert was pulled. The original video, featuring dancing cows, had received more than 67 million views.

== Filmography ==
List of music videos directed, showing year released and artist
Year	Song	Artist
2007	"Beggin' (Pilooski Re-Edit)"	Frankie Valli & The Four Seasons
2008	"My Territory"	Grand Popo Football Club
2010	"We Got More"	Eskmo
2011	"True Loves (Cereal Spiller Remix)"	Hooray for Earth
2012	"Yellow Bridges"	El Ten Eleven
2012	"Putty Boy Strut"	Flying Lotus
2013	"Cirrus"	Bonobo
2013	"Ratchet"	Bloc Party
2015	"Wind and Rains is Cold"	Cardiacs
2015	"There's Good Cud"	Cardiacs
2015	"Occupy"	Gong
2016	"Meowpurrdy"	Run the Jewels
2017	"UFOholic (Acid Abduction Mix)"	Denki Groove
2019	"Like and Subscribe"	Adam Buxton
2020	"The Existential Threat"	Sparks
2022	"Betray"	In Lumine
2024	"Polkamania" ("Helena Polka" segment)	"Weird Al" Yankovic
2025	"Dancing in the Middle"	Adam Buxton
