= SmileTV =

British television channels

Ownership
- Owner: Cellcast Group

History
- Launched: 27 April 2006

Availability

Terrestrial
- Freeview: Channel 673 (22:00–05:00) (3)

SmileTV is a range of British television channels owned by the Cellcast Group that broadcast various premium-rate telephone chat-line services.

== History ==
Square 1 Management Limited, a Cellcast subsidiary, launched SmileTV on digital terrestrial television (Freeview) channel 37 on 29 April 2006. It was carried on multiplex C, and timeshared with UKTV History – broadcasting from 1 am to 5 am. The channel, at launch, broadcast a premium phone-in quiz game service named Quizworld. Quizworld was also broadcast on other Cellcast-owned networks on Sky, and was also shown as part of Top Up TV Active intermittently outside of SmileTV's broadcast hours. The audio was accompanied by an on-screen MHEG graphic of the quiz. An MHEG graphic was used during the daytime and evening as Top Up TV had no space on the platform for an additional video stream. Quizworld aired from 1 am to 4 am, while the final hour of broadcast showcased a short-film entertainment programme named Shortcutters, an in-house programme produced by Cellcast.

Quizworld ended its run at the beginning of July due to low viewing figures, and was replaced with a premium-rate adult chatline service named Party People, a spin-off to Cellcast's Babestation programme that normally broadcast as a pre-watershed service on the titular Babestation network on Sky. Shortcutters ended its run at the end of August, being replaced with Teleshopping. In October, a text-based quiz service named Win Win TV took over the 3 am to 5 am slot, meaning Party People lost an hour in its timeslot.

In March 2007, following the 2007 British premium-rate phone-in scandal, Win Win TV was replaced with a simulcast of Cellcast's Sumo TV. SmileTV launched on Sky Digital the following month, although its schedule differed from the Freeview version, and eventually this version of the channel was renamed Blue Kiss TV in July. On 28 September 2007, the channel's Freeview airtime was moved to 3 am–7 am, to make way for the launch of Dave which had moved into the daytime space of the slot it occupied. By then, Party People had been renamed as Party Girls and became the entirety of the channel's slot.

In July 2008, Ofcom fined Cellcast £17,500 for breaches of Ofcom's Broadcasting Code for broadcasting explicit sexual content on the Sky version of the channel in May 2007. On 8 September 2008, a sister channel – SmileTV2, was launched on Freeview as a seven-month temporary slotted channel, running on limited capacity. Therefore, the channel was unavailable in Wales, due to S4C securing the slot for its text services. The channel aired from 10 am to 5 am, with its downtime slot holding a graphic of the channel's logo. The channel initially broadcast a telephone chat-line service named Life Coach TV for most of the day before switching to Party Girls during the 7 pm to 10 pm slot. After a few months, Life Coach TV was replaced with Psychic TV, and also began airing two daytime chat shows – The Chat and Smile & Date.

In February 2009, SmileTV2 dropped all mentioned programming in favour of Bingo on the Box: Live, before the channel ceased to broadcast on 17 March following the expiration of its slot so that Virgin1 could take over the capacity. In May, to make way for the launch of Quest, SmileTV moved to Channel 32 and SmileTV2 was relaunched on Channel 33 under a different broadcast capacity that time shared with Ideal World, and as such reduced its broadcast hours to 12 am–5 am. By this point, Party Girls ended its run, with its sister programme Babestation having taken over both slots. On 15 July, SmileTV's slot was replaced with The Big Deal, a premium quiz service, although it ran on a different broadcast capacity. As part of Freeview's major retuning at the end of September, SmileTV2 moved to Channel 94, while SmileTV3 launched on Channel 95. SmileTV3 was identical to 2 as it also aired Babestation, except it broadcast from 12 am to 8 am and was under the same slot that Price Drop TV was located in when it was reinstated on the service. Shortly afterwards, the channel reduced its broadcast hours to 12 am to 5 am, before extending to its current 10 pm to 5 am slot in 2011.

In 2012, SmileTV3 began broadcasting the X-rated pay-per-view service Babestation X between 22:00 and 00:00 and swapped to showing the Babestation "Get Lucky TV" channel from 00:00 to 05:00. After a while, this ended after BSX moved to its own channel slot, and went back to broadcasting Babestation.

SmileTV2 closed on 13 May 2020, following changes made to the Channel 4 channels 4Music & 4seven, as well as Together TV, which all temporarily broadcast from 10 pm to 7 am until 2 June on Freeview. As of 2025, SmileTV3 continues to broadcast on Freeview.
