= James Brown (editor) =

British journalist

James Brown (born 26 September 1965 in Leeds) is a British former journalist, author, radio host and media entrepreneur. His first book, Above Head Height: A Five-a-Side Life, was published in 2017 by Quercus and received positive reviews in The Guardian, The Australian and The Daily Telegraph. A renowned Leeds United supporter, Brown also co-hosts The Late Tackle on Talksport with the comedy writer Andy Dawson, of Athletico Mince fame. In addition to his media profile, he is the owner of Sabotage Times – a music, football and culture website – and the Sabotage Agency, which has provided content for such brands as Scotts, Carling and Adidas.

== Early life ==
Brown was born and raised in Leeds, and was educated at Lawnswood School. His mother had mental health problems, and died from a drug overdose in 1992.

== Early career ==
In 1985, Brown was a contributor to the alternative newspaper Leeds Other Paper. In 1986, following work on his fanzine Attack on Bzaag, he was hired as freelance features writer for Sounds. From there, he soon joined the magazine NME. In 1991, he became the manager of Fabulous, a rock band composed of various NME journalists. After leaving NME, he wrote features for the Sunday Times Magazine.

== Loaded ==
In 1994, Brown launched the magazine Loaded, which was an early example of the modern "lads' mag" format. He won the British Society of Magazine Editors' "Editors' Editor of the Year" award for his work on the title.

In a 1997 Independent interview, Brown expressed pride in his accomplishment in beginning Loaded, saying, "The facts are there. I started the most influential magazine in Britain in the last 10 years and made my last company millions and millions and millions of pounds after an outlay of virtually nothing, and I've got something like six or seven major publishing awards."

== GQ ==
In 1997, Brown left Loaded for the British edition of GQ. He launched the "Man of the Year" Awards and hired the then-unknown chef Jamie Oliver to write the food column. Brown left GQ in early 1999 over what were termed "philosophical differences", having included Field Marshal Rommel (shown in a photograph sporting a swastika band on his uniform) on a list of "The Most Fashionable Men of the Century".

== Later career ==
After leaving GQ, Brown launched his own company, I Feel Good, and subsequently acquired Viz, Fortean Times and Bizarre magazines from John Brown Publishing for £6.4 million.

He created the magazine Jack in August 2002. IFG was sold to Dennis Publishing for £5.1 million in 2003 after the company's annual losses doubled to £1.1 million and the film title Hotdog was sold, having failed to reach break-even. Speaking in 2010, Brown said he had "made a lot of mistakes" at IFG and felt "a bit embarrassed about how little I had made of the opportunities I had created". In July 2004, Dennis wrote off its investment in Jack and closed the title with paid-for sales stagnant at less than 28,000 copies.

In 2007, he was hired as editor-in-chief of the free-to-air TV channel Sumo TV, saying he had plans to push the genre of "spectacular voyeurism". The channel was briefly moved into the Adult, Gaming and Dating categories before refocusing on content provided by Psychic Television.

After selling IFG, Brown worked across the media. On television he appeared with Gok Wan in Miss Naked Beauty and was a participant in Channel 4's Extreme Detox. He also helped to create Flipside TV and co-produced over 50 episodes before the show was bought for Channel 4 and then Paramount.

Brown was appointed as consultant editor-in-chief at Sport Media Group, a part-time post, in November 2007. In January 2008, Barry McIlheney was hired by Brown as the new editor-in-chief. The two men were responsible for a relaunch of the Daily Sport and Sunday Sport newspapers in April 2008.

Brown also presented and co-produced I Predict a Riot for Bravo, a ten-part investigation into the history of civil disorder, and regularly appeared as a pundit on the BBC's art shows Newsnight Review and The Culture Show. In 2010 he oversaw the relaunch of the Sky Sports Magazine.

In May 2010, Brown launched the website Sabotage Times to focus on music, sports, fashion, travel, TV and film.

Since 2010, Brown has made frequent appearances in the media, both on the radio for Talksport's show The Warm Up, hosted by Brown, Johnny Vaughan and Gavin Woods, and as a guest panellist on Alan Davies' show As Yet Untitled, broadcast on Dave. He is also an active business speaker and took the stage alongside figures such as Kofi Annan and Al Gore at the Leaders in London summit in 2007.

In March 2019, Brown was appointed as editor-in-chief of FourFourTwo magazine. In August 2019, he left FourFourTwo after less than six months. It was later reported that he had made offensive remarks about the Tottenham Hotspur player Son Heung-min.

In November 2024, Brown, along with the core team at Loaded and outside observers, participated in the BBC Arena documentary Loaded: Lads, Mags and Mayhem, which was about the rise and cultural impact of Loaded and its subsequent imitators.
