= Great! Movies =

British free-to-air television channel showing films

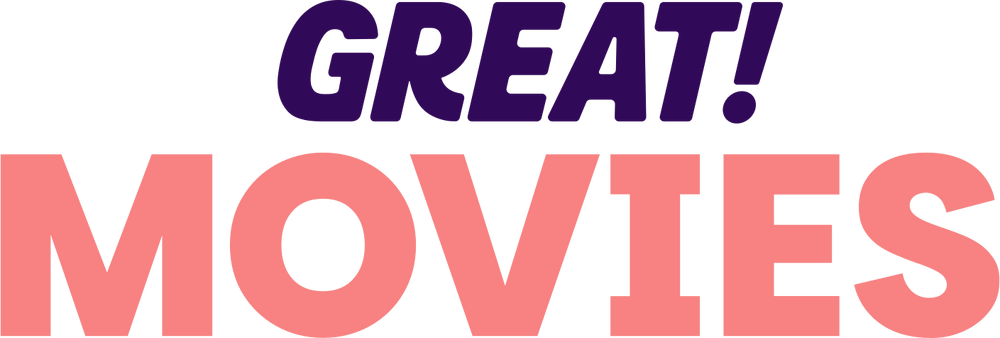
- Country: United Kingdom
- Broadcast area: United Kingdom; Ireland
- Headquarters: London, England

Programming
- Picture format: 1080i HDTV (downscaled to 16:9 576i for the SDTV feed)
- Timeshift service: Great! Movies +1 (replaced with Great! Mystery +1)

Ownership
- Owner: Sony Pictures Television (2012–2021); Narrative Entertainment UK Limited (2021–present)
- Sister channels: Great! TV; Great! Action; Great! Romance

History
- Launched: 3 May 2012; 14 years ago (linear television); 9 November 2022; 3 years ago (FAST channel)
- Replaced: Movies4Men 2 (Sky); Movie Mix (Freeview)
- Closed: 4 September 2025; 12 months ago (linear television)
- Replaced by: Great! Mystery
- Former names: Sony Movie Channel (2012–2019); Sony Movies (2019–2021)

Links
- Website: greatnetwork.com/movies

Availability Channel 50 on Freeview TV (UK)

Terrestrial
- Freeview: Channel 61

Streaming media
- Samsung TV Plus: Channel 4866

Great! Movies (stylised as GREAT! MOVIES) is a British free advertising-supported streaming television (FAST) service and formerly a free-to-air linear television channel owned by Narrative Entertainment UK Limited that broadcasts across the UK and Ireland showing films and related content. The channel was transmitted on most of the major broadcast platforms in the UK - terrestrial, satellite and cable. It was broadcast in standard-definition on satellite, cable, and terrestrial, was also broadcast in high-definition on Sky Glass and eventually commenced broadcasting on Samsung TV Plus and Rakuten TV in November 2022.

== History ==
=== Launch and transmission on satellite ===
The Sony Movie Channel brand was made available outside the US for the first time when a British version of the station launched on the Sky platform in the UK and Ireland on 3 May 2012. To release Sky guide slots for the launch of SMC and its +1 timeshift, Movies4Men 2 and its +1 service were closed (and thus lost by Freesat viewers).

At launch and until 2018, SMC was broadcast on a free-to-view basis, meaning that access to channel was only available to those with a Sky viewing card, and although no subscription payment was required to view the channel, it was unavailable to Freesat devices.

On 10 January 2017, Sony Movie Channel was added to Freeview and Virgin Media, replacing Movie Mix, which already broadcast some of the same content. In preparation for the switch, Movie Mix and SMC had been broadcasting an identical schedule in the final days prior to the transition.

Sony Movie Channel became fully free to air on satellite on 13 August 2018, in preparation for its full launch on the Freesat programme guide on 9 October 2018. To permit SMC's launch on Freesat, Sony reorganised their other movie channels on the guide: Movies4Men +1 was no longer listed on the Freesat guide as a result of the addition of SMC, though remains freely available for manual tune-in. Encryption was also removed from Sony Movie Channel +1 at the same time, though this was not added to the Freesat full guide.

On 24 July 2019, it was announced that the channel will be renamed as Sony Movies from 10 September 2019.

=== Great! Movies ===
On 25 May 2021, the channel rebranded as Great! Movies as the channel was acquired by Narrative Capital/Narrative Entertainment.

On 9 November 2022, Narrative Entertainment UK Limited announced the launch of a FAST version of Great! Movies, to stream on Samsung TV Plus, the new FAST network has the same branding as the linear channel, but a different schedule. A FAST version of Great! Movies Christmas was also launched.

In June 2023, the channel launched an on demand service known as Great! Player, available via the red button on Great! Movies on Freeview.

On 18 October 2023, Great! Movies +1 was replaced by Great! Movies Extra on Freeview channel 61. On 20 March 2024, Great! Movies Extra was replaced by Great! Real on Freeview channel 61.

On 4 September 2025, the channel was replaced by Great! Mystery on Freeview, Sky & Virgin. The Great! Mystery FAST variant was replaced by a FAST version of Great! Christmas on Samsung, Rakuten and Netgem TV, but on Freeview it was replaced by the FAST version of Great! Movies.

On 19 August 2026, it was announced that Pop, along with Great! Movies and the other Great! channels will be added to TiVo devices.

=== Logos ===
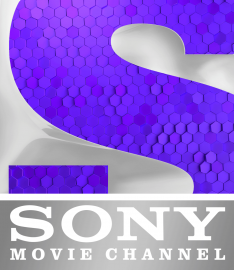
Sony Movie Channel (2017–2019)

Sony Movies (2019–2021)

Sony Movies +1 (2019–2021)
