= Great! Mystery =

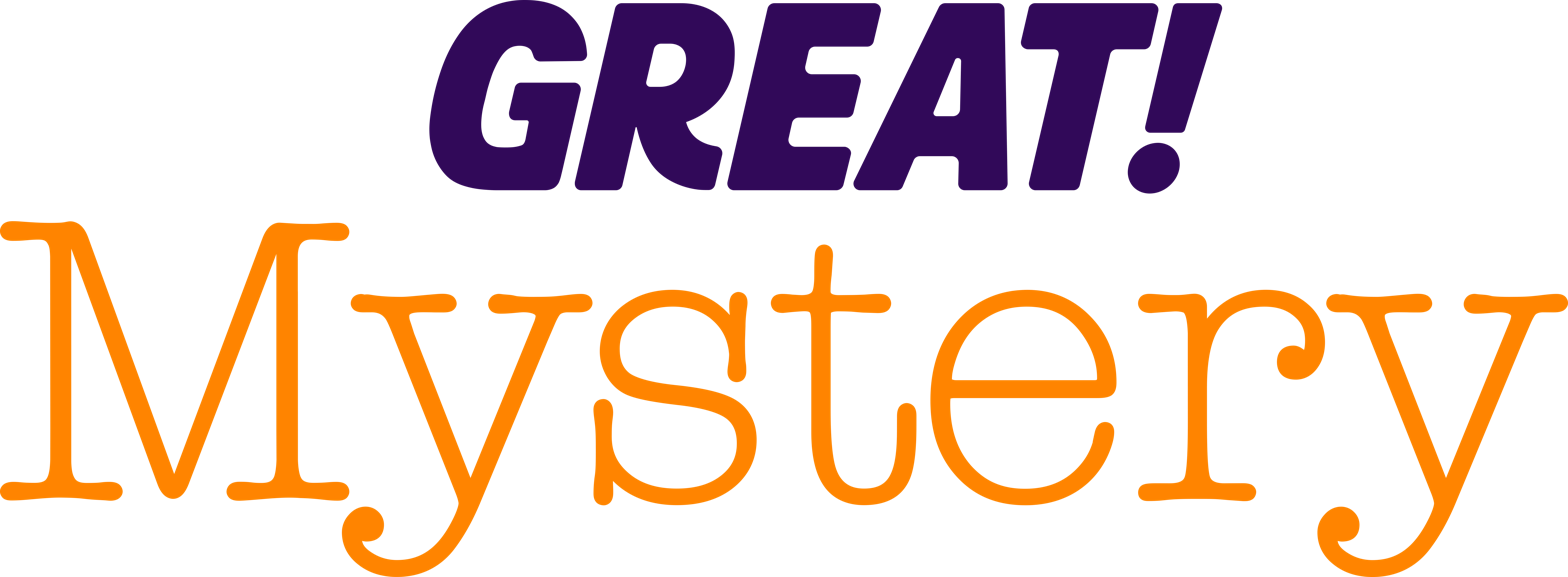
- Logo used since 2025

Programming
- Timeshift service: Great! Mystery +1

Ownership
- Owner: Narrative Entertainment UK Limited
- Sister channels: Great! TV; Great! Action; Great! Romance

History
- Launched: June 2024; 2 years ago (as FAST channel); September 4, 2025; 14 months ago (as linear channel)
- Replaced: Great! Movies (as linear channel)

Great! Mystery (stylised as GREAT! Mystery) is a British free-to-air television channel and FAST channel owned by Narrative Entertainment UK Ltd that broadcasts crime drama series and movies.

== History ==
=== FAST channel ===
In May 2024, it was announced that Narrative Entertainment would be launching Great! Mystery and children's channel POP Up as FAST channels in June 2024, following the success of Great! Real, and the Great! network's Irish expansion, with LG Channels, Netgem, Plex, and Samsung TV Plus confirmed to be their dedicated platforms. It joined Samsung's service in March 2025. In April 2026, Narrative reached a partnership with the UK division of Indian streaming platform ZEE5 to bring all six of their Great! channels, including Mystery to their platform. In June 2026, they struck the same agreement with Scottish media company STV Group to make all of their channels and video on demand content available through the STV Player.

=== Television channel ===
On November 20, 2024, it launched as a Freeview channel in the EPG slot formerly occupied by Great! Real, which later became a streaming-only channel. Upon launching, it aired drama series Aurora Teagarden Mysteries and Lost Letter Mysteries, and crime movies Drive, Lucky Number Slevin, Murder 101, and The Whistleblower. It launched as a free-to-air linear channel on Freely (though only when an aerial is connected), Sky, and Virgin Media at 8am on 4 September 2025, replacing sister channel Great! Movies. Some of the shows aired in this launch were Castle, Murder, She Wrote, and The Ruth Rendell Mysteries.

== Programming ==
- Air Rescue
- Castle
- Diagnosis: Murder
- In Plain Sight
- Murder, She Wrote
- Reef Break
- Unforgettable

=== Former programming ===
- Ruth Rendell Mysteries
- Sue Thomas: F.B.Eye
