= Smile TV =

Smile TV may refer to:

- Smile TV (Greece), children's television channel founded in 1999
- SmileTV, British television channel group on Freeview
- Smile (TV network), defunct American children's television network
