= Andrew Dawson =

Andrew or Andy Dawson may refer to:

- Anderson Dawson (Andrew Dawson, 1863–1910), Australian politician, Premier of Queensland for one week in 1899
- Andrew Dawson (murderer) (born 1961), British serial killer
- Andrew Dawson (record producer) (born 1980), American music producer, engineer, mixer and songwriter
- Andrew Dawson, British comedy writer of the Dawson Bros.
- Andy Dawson (footballer, born 1978), English footballer
- Andy Dawson (footballer, born 1979), English footballer
- Andy Dawson (podcaster), British freelance writer and podcaster
