= More Than Movies =

Programming
- Timeshift service: More Than Movies +1

Ownership
- Owner: Sony Pictures Television

History
- Launched: 4 October 2010
- Closed: 22 March 2016
- Replaced by: True Crime
- Former names: Men&Movies (2010–13)

Availability at time of closure

Terrestrial
- Freeview: Channel 32 (named as Movie Mix)

More Than Movies (styled as more>movies) was a satellite television channel in the United Kingdom and Ireland, available on Sky and as a free-to-air service on Freesat. It launched on 4 October 2010 as Men&Movies, and was the first Freesat exclusive TV channel until it joined the Sky EPG on 4 April 2011. Between November 2011 and January 2012, Men&Movies was also available on Freeview in Manchester.

The channel was aimed at the middle to old aged male viewer, with its programming oriented around war documentaries, classic TV series and the war film genre. More Than Movies joined its sister channel, Movies4Men which transmits other cinematic genres.

On 2 April 2012, Men&Movies +1 was launched.

On 10 January 2013, Men&Movies was rebranded as More Than Movies, with a shift towards airing films and programmes from Sony's back catalogue. On 17 January 2013, Movie Mix began to simulcast the full More Than Movies schedule on Freeview but retained its own Movie Mix branding. After the channel closed, Movie Mix began to broadcast its own programming again.

== Programmes ==
- Baywatch
- Cops
- The Guardian
- Storm Warning
- Providence
