= Great! Christmas =

British free-to-air TV channel

- Country: United Kingdom
- Broadcast area: United Kingdom; Ireland

Programming
- Timeshift service: Great! Christmas +1

Ownership
- Owner: Sony Pictures Television (2019–2021); Narrative Entertainment UK Limited (2021–present)
- Sister channels: Great! Action; Great! Mystery; Great! TV

History
- Launched: 10 September 2019; 7 years ago
- Replaced: True Movies
- Former names: Sony Movies Classic (2019–2021); Great! Movies Classic (2021–2023)

Links
- Website: greatnetwork.com/christmas

Availability

Terrestrial
- Freeview: Channel 52

Streaming media
- Samsung TV Plus: 4886

Great! Christmas (stylized as GREAT! christmas) is a British free-to-air TV channel owned by Narrative Entertainment UK Limited that launched 10 September 2019 as Sony Movies Classic, replacing True Movies. The launch began with a temporary seasonal replacement called Sony Movies Christmas, lasting from 10 September 2019 to 7 January 2020. The channel is dedicated to romantic, made-for-TV movies from the 2010s to today.

The brand voice of the channel is British voice-over artist Ben Neidle, who voices the promos and continuity links.

== History ==
Prior to the 10 September 2019 launch of Sony Movies Classic, the channel was known as True Movies. This channel topped all the film channels in August 2005. The first time a Christmas replacement of the channel was made was in 2013. On 24 July 2019, it was announced that True Movies, Along with Movies4Men and True Entertainment would be closed and replaced by this channel from 10 September, after the temporary Sony Movies Christmas replacement on 10 September 2019

Sony Movies Christmas returned on 24 September 2020, and ran until 4 January 2021.

Due to Narrative Capital acquiring SPT's full UK portfolio on 14 May 2021, the channel was rebranded as Great! Movies Classic on 25 May 2021.

As per its time under Sony ownership, the channel becomes a 'Christmas movie' channel over the last quarter of the broadcasting year. In 2021 it was rebranded for the first time as Great! Movies Christmas, with a seasonal film schedule running from 23 September 2021 until 4 January 2022. It returned for the Christmas 2022 season, a few weeks earlier on 8 September 2022, 108 days before Christmas. This schedule continued until 2 January 2023, with the +1 channel in Greater Manchester also reflecting the change.

On 5 January 2023, Great! Movies Classic was rebranded as Great! Romance showing romantic films all day every day.

From 7 September 2023, it was rebranded to Great! Christmas until 3 January 2024 for the Christmas period. It returned on 5 September 2024. It returned again on 4 September 2025. It will return on 26 August 2026.

On 18 October 2023, Great! Romance +1 was replaced by Great! Romance Mix on Freeview channel 63. It was moved to channel 62 on 20 November 2024.

On 19 August 2026, it was announced that Pop, along with Great! Romance and the other Great! channels will be added to TiVo devices.

=== Logos ===
Sony Movies Classic (10 September 2019 until 25 May 2021)

Sony Movies Classic +1 (10 September 2019 until 25 May 2021)

Great! Movies Classic (25 May 2021 until 5 January 2023)

Great! Romance (5 January 2023 until 4 September 2025)

Great! Romance +1 (5 January 2023 until 4 September 2025)

==== Temporary Logos ====
Sony Movies Christmas (10 September 2019 until 5 January 2021)

Sony Movies Christmas +1 (10 September 2019 until 5 January 2021)

Great! Christmas (4 September 2025 to present).
