= Sony Channel (Russia) =

Defunct Russian television channel

Sony Channel Russia
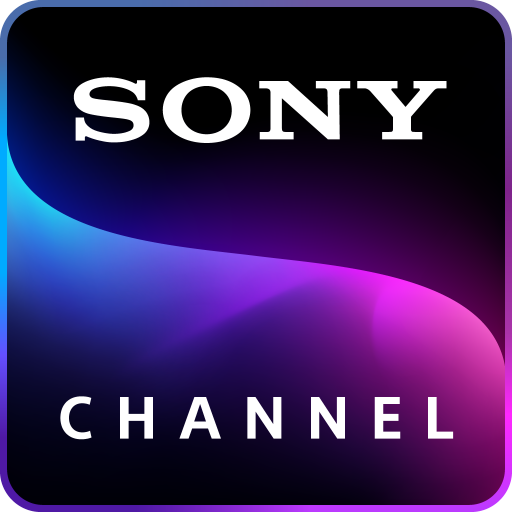
- Logo since 2025
- Founded: October 1, 2008
- Defunct: 2021
- Headquarters: Moscow, Russia
- Parent: Sony Pictures Entertainment

Sony Channel Russia was the Russian branch of international pay television Sony Channel, broadcasting TV shows and movies on air in Russia. Sony Channel provides television content from Sony Pictures as well as third-party distributors. Sony channel also provides a special original content commissioned by locals and global parties. It is a division of Sony Pictures Television Inc., a Sony Pictures Entertainment company. The portfolio of SPT Networks reaches over 2 billion viewers around the world broadcasting in 178 countries worldwide and includes over 150 entertainment channels.

Specifically, Sony Channel Russia broadcasts regionally to Russia and neighboring countries: The Republic of Belarus, Armenia, Azerbaijan, Georgia, Kazakhstan, Kyrgyzstan, and Moldova.

== History ==
Former logo used between 2014–2019

Originally founded in 2000 producing Russian market TV-series, Sony Pictures Television Russia was called Lean-M Productions before a majority stake acquisition from Sony Pictures Television in 2007. Lean-M is now owned entirely by Sony Pictures Television Russia.

In February 2018, Sony Corp. production studio, Sony Pictures Television, and Russian media holding company National Media Group (NMG) set up a joint venture to operate Sony's paid television channels in Russia. NMG said it would acquire 80 percent in a company broadcasting Sony channels in Russia. NMG did not disclose financial details of the transaction. NMG acquired 80% of the following channels:

- Sony Sci-Fi
- Sony Entertainment Television (Russia)
- Sony Turbo

Sony Channel is currently managed by Vladmir Utin (Chief Operating Officer) and Mikhail Rossolko (Chief Creative Officer).

== Content ==
Sony channel operates three channels: Sony Sci-Fi, Sony Entertainment Television, and Sony Turbo. Sony Sci-Fi was launched in Russia in 2007 as AXN-Sci-Fi and in 2013 it changed its name to Sony Sci-Fi. Its content includes sci-fi, fantasy, supernatural, and adventure fiction. In 2009, Sony Entertainment Television was launched in hopes of attracting a female audience. Then in 2012 Sony Turbo was launched with the male audience in mind.

Sony Pictures Television Russia has produced a number of primetime drama series, telenovelas, and sitcoms. The company adapted various television formats for Russian audiences such as Betty La Fea (romanized: Ne Rodis Krasivoy), Midwives (Akusherka), Married...with Children (Shchastlivy Vmeste), and Everybody Loves Raymond (Voroniny). With over 500 episodes, Everybody Loves Raymond was officially recorded by Guinness World Records as the world’s longest-running adaptation of a TV series.

"Sony Pictures Television Russia co-created and co-produced the CTC's hit series The Eighties (Vosmidesyatye) and scripted reality series Strong Medicine (Vernoe Sredstvo), which has over 300 episodes. Among the most popular projects of Sony Pictures Television Russia are an original TV-series, Poor Nastya (Bednaya Nastya), and a local version of the American sitcom, The Nanny (Moya Prekrasnaya Nyanya)."

"Over the last few years, Sony Pictures Television Russia has successfully developed and produced several non-scripted projects, including original formats and adaptations, such as Momsters (Moya Svekrov Monstr), To Forgive or To Revenge (Izmeny), and Fish on The Cake (Idealnyy Uzhin)."

"Sony Pictures Television Russia plans to continue its cooperation with the leading TV channels and online platforms in Russia and to produce more formats in different genres, from reality shows to historical dramas."
