= Movies4Men 2 =

Former television channel in the UK and Ireland

Movies4Men2
Programming
- Timeshift service: Movies4Men2 +1

Ownership
- Owner: Sony Pictures Television
- Sister channels: Movies4Men

History
- Launched: 1 February 2006
- Replaced: Bad Movies
- Closed: 2 May 2012
- Replaced by: Sony Movie Channel
- Former names: ACTIONMAX (1 February – 9 October 2006)

Movies4Men2 was a satellite television film channel in the United Kingdom and Ireland, available as a free-to-air service on Freesat, Sky and as in the basic package on Smallworld Cable. Prior to 9 October 2006, Movies4Men2 was previously known as ACTIONMAX. Between November 2011 and January 2012, Movies4Men2 and Movies4Men2 +1 were also available on Freeview in Manchester.

Different from Movies4Men, the channel was aimed at the young to middle aged male audience, focusing mainly on action and thriller film genres. As of September 2008, the channels transmuted films in 16:9 widescreen where available. A timeshifted version of the channel, Movies4Men2 +1, launched on Sky 326 on Monday 27 October 2008.

The channel closed on 2 May 2012 ahead of the launch of Sony Movie Channel and Sony Movie Channel +1 the following day.
