= Sony Crime Channel =

Defunct British Free to air Crime channel owned by Sony Pictures Television

- Country: United Kingdom

Programming
- Picture format: 576i 16:9 SDTV

Ownership
- Owner: Sony Pictures Television

History
- Launched: 6 February 2018; 7 years ago
- Replaced: Sony Channel (original)
- Closed: 9 June 2020; 5 years ago
- Replaced by: Court TV (on Sky)

Links
- Website: Official website

Sony Crime Channel was a British channel, focusing on crime television programmes and documentaries. It was launched on 6 February 2018 and was owned by Sony Pictures Television. It aired crime programming targeted at a female audience.

== History ==
Sony Crime Channel launched in February 2018, replacing the original Sony Channel, and True Crime on Freeview and Freesat. At time of launch, it broadcast a range of crime dramas, including the free-to-air premiere of Orange Is the New Black as well as reruns of CSI: Crime Scene Investigation and Hustle.

In June 2019, ultimately due to low ratings, Sony announced that the channel would be downgraded, reducing its output to reality crime programming, akin to its now defunct sister channels True Crime and TruTV. Prior to these changes, a month earlier, the channel was withdrawn from Freesat and was moved to the G-MAN multiplex on Freeview, reducing availability to Manchester only and moved to channel 60. Additionally, its broadcast hours were cut down to 4:00 - 6:00 and its +1 service was replaced by Movies4Men +1. These Freeview changes occurred as a result of True Entertainment and True Movies moving to the local multiplex.

In September 2019, as part of a revamp of Sony's entertainment portfolio in the UK, Sony Crime Channel was the only channel without any sign of change. The channel swapped places with True Entertainment on Sky prior to Sony Channel's re-launch in the UK. The channel was replaced by Sony Channel +1 on Freeview, and at the end of the following month, Sony Crime Channel +1 closed on Sky.

The channel abruptly closed on 9 June 2020 after the announce of its closure.

On 13 August 2020, an editor on the site TV Channel Lists noticed Sony Crime began broadcasting again with colour bars. This indicated that Sony Crime may make a return in the near-future. However, as of 10 September 2020, the channel's slot on Sky was occupied by Court TV.
