= Fabulous (band) =

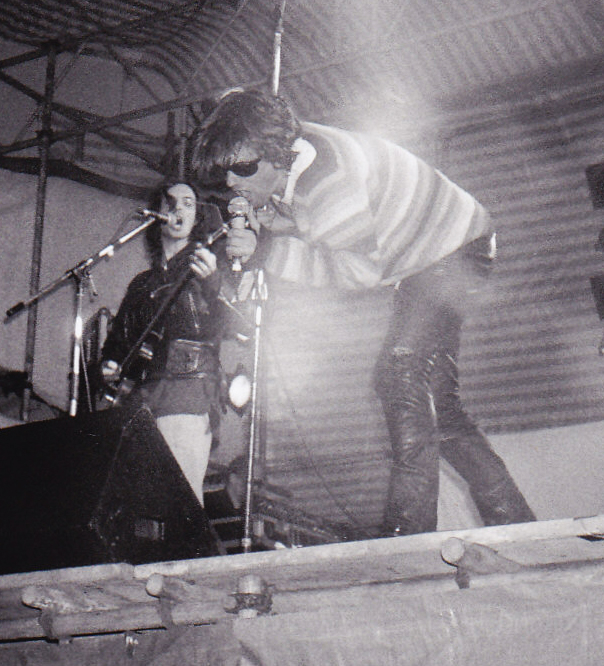

Background information
- Also known as: Baggy
- Origin: United Kingdom
- Genres: Indie rock
- Years active: 1991–1993
- Label: Heavenly Records
- Past members: Simon Spence Dudfield; Martyn Goodacre; Robert Hodges; Russell Underwood; Ronnie Flynn

Fabulous were a British rock band formed in 1991 by NME journalist Simon Spence (a.k.a. Dudfield) and NME photographer Martyn Goodacre, initially under the name Baggy.

== History ==
The original line up included Spence (vocals), Goodacre (guitar), Russell Underwood (guitar), Kieron "Ronnie Fabulous" Flynn (bass) and Robert "Hodge" Hodges (drums). Briefly called Baggy, the band were managed by NME features editor James Brown who claimed that the exploits of Fabulous were the inspiration behind his later creation of Loaded magazine. Their debut single "Destined To Be Free" was released on Heavenly Records in November 1991. The sleeve was designed by Screamadelica artist Paul Cannell (HVN 11). "Destined To Be Free" was made "Single of The Week" in the NME. The band were at the centre of much controversy over their often-brief live shows and obscene Cannell-designed T-shirts. Jacqui and Carrie of future Shampoo fame often appeared on stage with the group and ran their fan club. Malcolm McLaren suggested Fabulous work with Pete Waterman and the group signed to Waterman's PWL in 1992 (and were handed their own label PWL Rock).

After appearing on Waterman's The Hitman And Her TV show, Fabulous and PWL parted company. The album they were working on, Produced by Kylie, has never been officially released. Two further singles, "Personality Recession" and "Dead Friends" were recorded independently and released on the Kinglake Records label. Fabulous worked briefly with Andrew Loog Oldham's Immediate Records before disbanding.

== Publicity ==
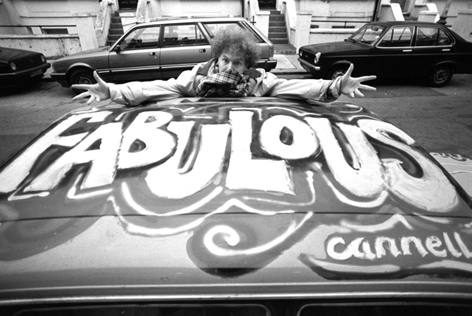
Malcolm McLaren and the Fab Mobile

The band were better known by their hype than their music. Never out of the music paper gossip columns, they made tabloid headlines by being banned from nearly every venue on their debut UK tour. "Fabulous bad boys banned" splashed The Sun after an infamous stage-wrecking performance at Kingston Polytechnic that was also reviewed by the NME. Further publicity came via an association with American actor Keanu Reeves chronicled by The Daily Star, Smash Hits and The Face.

Their Austin Maxi motor (left), dubbed the "Fab Mobile", was painted by Paul Cannell and was featured in a lengthy TV feature about Fabulous on the BBC2 music show Rapido. Razorlight manager Roger Morton gave them their first live review in the NME on 27 July 1991 - their first ever gig — "the least dour group you will ever see". They featured heavily in i-D, The Face, The Wire, Select, and Melody Maker. Author Mark Simpson (journalist) profiled them in The Guardian, and featured the group in his first book Male Impersonators. Radio broadcaster and author Stuart Bailie strongly supported them at the NME, making their debut single "single of the week" and, in a January 1992 cover story, writing: "They terrify the Manics. They flaunt porno t-shirts. They steal carpets, and erm, Santas. They are a sick NME joke. They are a daft, manipulative group, noisy, reckless, exciting."

== Individual careers ==
Martyn Goodacre is a photographer, musician and the owner of Kinglake Records. Simon Spence (under the name 'Simon Dudfield') contributed interviews and research to the books Stoned and 2Stoned, the autobiographies of The Rolling Stones' manager Andrew Loog Oldham. Ronnie Fabulous is a filmmaker. Robert Hodges works at the Malvern Theatre in Worcestershire, as well as playing drums with The Tights & Dogs of Santorini.

== Discography ==
=== Singles ===
- "Destined To Be Free" / "There's a Riot Going On" 7" (1991), Heavenly
- "Personality Recession" 12" (1992), Kinglake
- "Dead Friends" 7" (1993), Kinglake
- "Woolly Bully" (1993), Immediate Records - unreleased

=== Albums ===
- 'Get Fucked by Fabulous' (2022), Supermegabot
