= Cellcast Group =

British television broadcasting company

Cellcast Group is a broadcasting company based in the United Kingdom. They operate channels (or have operated channels) on the Sky UK, Virgin Media, YouTube, Freesat and Freeview TV platforms in the UK and internationally via paid programming which consist of participatory television programming such as phone-ins, teleshopping and quiz channels. They are also a provider of software development services for the media industry such as second screen application development, production of digital on screen graphics, mobile gaming development, direct carrier billing, EPG systems and internet marketing.

== History ==
- 2001 - The company is founded by Andrew Wilson and Bertrand Folliet and forms partnerships to distribute mobile content with companies such as News Corporation, Sony BMG, Yahoo and AOL Europe., and becomes one of the biggest ringtone sellers in Asia.
- 2002 - Starts broadcasting interactive content on various existing channels on Sky Digital via paid programming such as text in shows and competitions.
- 2004 - The Psychic Today UK TV channel is launched. Interactive TalkSport TV show is launched.
- 2005 - The company is listed on the Alternative Investment Market of the London Stock Exchange. The company launches a Digital Pet like channel called 'Paddock'.
- 2006 - Signs contracts with Brazil Telecom, Telefónica and RedeTV! to broadcast interactive TV during football breaks. Launches Sumo TV In the United Kingdom. Launches Bid2Win TV show in India on Sony TV, Sahara One, Zoom TV and Zee TV. The company is appointed to handle regional voting for The X Factor.
- 2007 - Launches Sumo TV in Brazil on TV Cultura. Launches a mobile portal in France with Canal+, SFR and Bouygues Telecom. The company wins 'best interactive show' at the Indian Telly Awards for their Bid2Win show. Signs a deal with Bebo to distribute Sumo TV on its social networking website.
- 2008 - The company sells two Sky UK electronic programme guide slots for £1.4m to Discovery Networks.
- 2009 - Launches The Big Deal TV channel in the United Kingdom with programming consisting of teleshopping and phone-in quiz shows. Acquires mobile content rights to the Indian Premier League.
- 2010 - Indian programming is expanded to include a variety of interactive TV formats including 'Sa Re Gaana', an interactive version of the show Sa Re Ga Ma Pa.
- 2011 - The company launches TView, which is a Pay Per View channel on Freeview which allows viewers to pay for movies via SMS text messages, on the phone or online.
- 2013 - Psychic Today is launched in the United States as paid programming on the TV channel Telos.
- 2014 - The company's middle eastern operations are acquired by BinBit. The Big Deal is sold to Sony Entertainment Networks for £2.98m.
- 2019 - The company was sold as part of a management buyout to Com & Tel Media Limited currently owned by Craig Gardiner and Emmanuelle Erna Guicharnaud. Its investment operations are retained by Vintana Plc.
