= Open Access (UK and Ireland TV channels) =

Open Access, Open Access 2 and Open Access 3 were a set of television channels based in the United Kingdom and broadcast on the Sky Digital satellite platform. They broadcast old films and also sought to broadcast new work from small independent producers.

OFCOM listed the licences for Open Access and Open Access 2 as registered to Open Access Group Limited, while the licence for Open Access 3 was registered to Trace TV (UK) Limited. Both companies had the same address in Hoxton Square, London.

The company structure is quite complicated, although not unusually so. The formal registered address of all the companies is that of a firm of chartered accountants in Friern Barnet, north London, however, as is common, this is not the operating address but the address of representatives who handle accounting and legal matters. Documents available through the companies' associated websites state that Open Access is a trading name of Definition Broadcast Limited. Definition Broadcast is a company providing various technical services for digital television broadcasting and has an address in Regent Street, central London. However the address of the registered contacts for the firm's internet domain "definition.tv" is the same Hoxton Square address as that of the Open Access companies.

The main content on the Open Access channels were old films, broadcast under the Hollywood Classics Network brand, which appeared to be a separate operation with a postal address in Brixworth, Northamptonshire. Another brand is Open View, which was described as a "rolling film competition available to all film makers and media artists". Applicants were charged a fee of £50 to enter their work into the scheme and have it broadcast.

From February 2010, Open Access 3 broadcast live coverage of the NASCAR Sprint Cup Series.

Open Access closed on 3 December 2009, after its Sky EPG slot of channel 883 was purchased by Renault TV. Open Access 2 closed on 21 September 2010 after its Sky EPG slot of channel 189 was purchased by Information TV for Information TV +1. Finally, Open Access 3 closed on 4 April 2011 after its Sky EPG slot of channel 190 was purchased by Sony Pictures Television for Sony Entertainment Television.

Between 17 December 2007 and 1 September 2010 the Open Access Group also operated OMusic TV.
