= Movie Mix =

Former British free-to-air television channel showing films

- Country: United Kingdom
- Broadcast area: United Kingdom; Ireland
- Headquarters: London, United Kingdom

Programming
- Picture format: 576i 16:9 SDTV

Ownership
- Owner: Square 1 Management Ltd. (Cellcast Group) (2009-2014); Sony Pictures Television (2014-2017)

History
- Launched: 15 July 2009; 16 years ago
- Closed: 10 January 2017; 8 years ago
- Replaced by: Sony Movie Channel
- Former names: The Big Deal (2009-2012)

Availability

Terrestrial
- Freeview: Channel 32

Movie Mix was a television channel that was originally available through the Freeview platform, initially as a live-quiz service under the name of The Big Deal in July 2009 before being turned into a movie channel in December 2012.

On 10 January 2017, the network was replaced with Sony Movie Channel, which Movie Mix already broadcast similar programming to.

== History ==
=== The Big Deal ===
The channel was launched as The Big Deal on 15 July 2009. The Big Deal was a phone-in quiz game service that showcased presenter-led games and puzzles, with cash prizes to be won for viewers who guessed the correct answers. Viewers were asked to call in or log on to The Big Deal website to enter these games. The channel aired seven days a week from 10:00pm–5:00am, timesharing with RT and Create and Craft on Multiplex D. on 30 September 2009, as part of Freeview's major retuning, Rocks & Co. was added, which caused The Big Deal to reduce its broadcast hours to 12:30am–5:00am.

On 6 November 2009, The Big Deal ceased broadcasting its live quiz content, with the channel being turned into a full-time Teleshopping network. In January 2010, the channel's broadcast hours were reduced further to 4:00am–6:00am. By June 2010, the channel began time sharing with Dave Ja Vu, at the same hours.

At the end of 2010, a 24-hour version of the channel was made available in post-digital switchover areas. the fulltime version was made available in all areas on 2 March 2011.

On 12 April 2011, The Big Deal began broadcasting TView, a short-lived pay-per-view film service, with broadcasting hours reduced to 18:00-05:00. The TView service ran until 27 April 2011, when it was replaced by teleshopping, and its hours were reduced further to 18:00-22:00. From 7 July 2011, The Big Deal changed back to operating 05:00-06:00, then, on 6 September 2011 it changed its broadcasting 00:00-04:00. The broadcasting hours were changed again on 20 October 2011 to 03:00-05:00. By this point, in addition to teleshopping presentations the channel also broadcast psychic sessions in which the viewer could ask for their own psychic reading.

=== Movie Mix ===
On 6 December 2012, The Big Deal was renamed Movie Mix on the programme guide, and reacquired a 24-hour broadcast slot. The channel continued airing chiefly teleshopping - initially via a simulcast of Speed Auction TV - as well as a classic movie each night.

On 17 January 2013, Movie Mix on Freeview began to simulcast the full schedule of films and programmes of satellite channel More Than Movies (previously known as men&movies), though presented under the retained Movie Mix branding. The Movie Mix channel initially remained owned and operated by Cellcast subsidiary Square 1 Management, but using More Than Movies programming under license from Sony Pictures Television.

In March 2014, Cellcast agreed to early termination of its exclusive rights for Movie Mix for a one-off payment of £2.98m from Entertainment Networks, a subsidiary of Sony Pictures Television, bringing Movie Mix and More Than Movies under common ownership. The channels continued to carry the same programming and split branding as before.

On 22 March 2016, More Than Movies on satellite was closed down and was replaced by True Crime, with Movie Mix retained on Freeview only, broadcasting its own programming schedule, By this time many films on Movie Mix on Freeview were also being broadcast on the Sony Movie Channel on satellite, though the channels retained separate schedules and branding.

On 12 August 2016 Movie Mix began testing on Virgin Media cable systems, with the channel fully launched on 25 August 2016. This meant the Movie Mix schedule was now available on terrestrial and cable platforms, but not on satellite.

In December 2016 it was announced that Sony Movie Channel would be re-launched and made available over cable and Freeview in January 2017, by way of a rebranding of Movie Mix. On 10 January 2017, Sony Movie Channel replaced Movie Mix Freeview and Virgin Media platforms. In preparation for the switch Movie Mix and SMC had been broadcasting an identical schedule in the final days prior to the transition.
