= Athletico Mince =

British comedy podcast

- Genre: Comedy
- Language: English

Cast and voices
- Hosted by: Andy Dawson; Bob Mortimer

Music
- Opening theme: "Oriental Flavor" by Marco Brambilla

Production
- Length: 30-60 Minutes

Technical specifications
- Audio format: Apple Podcasts, SoundCloud, Acast

Publication
- No. of episodes: 324
- Original release: 8 March 2016

Reception
- Ratings: 5/5

Related
- Website: athleticomince.com/

Athletico Mince is a British comedy podcast hosted by Bob Mortimer and Andy Dawson. The series began life as a humorous take on the world of football, including discussions such as whether being gentle in the Premier League makes one a better manager. As the podcast evolved however, the focus of the segments has switched more towards the bizarre, and often true, experiences and encounters of the hosts. Despite the move away from football, there are still a number of features that include personalities within the world of sport such as Steve McClaren, Mark Lawrenson and Peter Beardsley. Other features include Mortimer's trips to South Africa, Dom Littlewood and Dawson's interactions with Jeremy Corbyn.

The podcast was first released on 8 March 2016. In late 2016 a live version of the show was created and has since been toured around the UK, with a video available online. As of March 2018, the podcast had over 30 million listeners, with over 200,000 per episode.

Since April 2019, the podcast has used Patreon as a platform to introduce the 'Club Parsnips' membership. This allows the audience to pay for the content, if they wish. The benefits include bonus episodes, access to episodes earlier and no advertisements during episodes.

On 23 September 2026, Dawson and Mortimer released a statement that Athletico Mince had ended. They thanked listeners "for the huge amounts of support you've given us over the past ten years as we all went up, up, up into the podcast sky together", echoing a refrain often used by Mortimer's Barry Homeowner character.

== Characters ==
The podcasts include a number of real and fictional characters, voiced by both hosts, in semi-regular sections. Main sections of the podcast include:

- Andy's Intro Sigh
- Barry Homeowner (a character on which Mortimer based his incredibly popular 'Train Guy' Twitter sketches).
- Adrian Lewis and his visits to Slaughters, a restaurant staffed by the waiter, and Ron Craggs
- Dom Littlewood presents Fake or Legit / Who's the Prick? and The Dom Pod
- The Adventures of Mark Lawrenson and Robson Green
- Peter Beardsley and Mrs Beardsley
- An increasingly effeminate Steve McClaren, his best friend Casper the Snake and partner, Fat Lass
- Bob's South African Tales
- Gangs of the EPL featuring Harry Kane and 'Debbie' Alli of 'The White Hearts', with recurring characters Jordan Henderson, Phil Jones, Jamie Vardy, Santi Cazorla, Theo Walcott, Eric Dier, and occasional characters Andy Carroll, Jack Wilshere, Son Heung-Min & Eden Hazard.
- Andy's run-ins with Jeremy Corbyn
- British Managers Lunch Club featuring Sam Allardyce, Tony Pulis, David Moyes, Alan Pardew, Nigel Pearson and more
- Bob's Wife's Questions / Questions from Andy's kids
- Memory Man, where Bob is posed a question from Andy, in which he is asked if he remembers a certain football result/event, later progressing to general knowledge questions. The question is always posed "do you remember...?", to which Bob always answers "yes, I do", insinuating that he has incredible knowledge.
- Sights, Sounds or Songs of Sunderland
- Secret Soccer Superstar - a "former football star" with a Geordie accent who tells slightly absurd stories of his playing days, without letting on his identity
- Kiss the Alderman - stories of Bob's interactions with 'The Alderman', an eccentric character who pursues and tricks Bob into situations in order to receive a kiss from Bob. Other characters in the sketches include the 'Vicar Who Stinks of Bleach', 'Biffy Clyro' (Simon Neil) who is always drawing on himself with pens, & the 'Town Clerk'.
- Observational Comedy
- Vince Parsnips
- Scottish Tales - Bob's 'songs' from a (presumably) remote Scottish island, whose young male residents yearn to escape the rule of the laird of the island and flee to the mainland, drawn in by Timpson's shoe repair and key cutting machines and Costa Coffee shops, with their free WiFi. A repeating theme is that, once the young men finally reach the mainland, they are seduced by a young lady "with plenty tit to spare", which is often a trap by the laird and they are captured and returned to the island, where they face execution by the laird's henchman. Before they are killed however, they die from surprise of the unusual faces of the henchman.
- The Guru
- Bananarama
- Yes/No Behind the Door
- Lenny Biscuits
- The Landlord
- Mick McCarthy
- Roy Hodgson and his Warhammer obsession
- Martin Roberts visits footballers' homes
- Nigel Pearson WAVs
- Crime Files (featuring Neil Hunt, Nonsense Potter)
- The Guru
- Boing, Quack Quack, Oops, Peanuts, Thwack, Crunch, Give Me Just a Little More Time, Boing Boing, Oops, Wooah Yeah, etc. Quiz
- Marlene/Free Sweeties Quiz
- Sean Dyche’s motivational WAVs
- Talksport
- Geordie Heat - a 'Nutflix' documentary about a squad of police officers made up of DC Denise Welch, Chief Inspector Steve Bruce (later replaced by DCI Eddie Howe), DC Jordan Henderson, DI Jonjo Shelvey (who takes on the character of a vampire from Eastern Europe) & DC Carol Beardsley (Peter Beardsley's wife). Each skit consists of the Squad receiving a phone call from 'Mr Sting', in the "massive house" with various trivial problems for the squad to resolve. Later episodes feature Amanda Staveley who insists on being called 'Amanda Baby'.
- John Omsk, Albanian trance music overlord

Other, less frequent, characters include Dara Ó Briain, Piers Morgan, Gregg Wallace, Alan Brazil, Ian Holloway, Chris Evans, Billy Bragg, Jim White, Joe Swash and Jordan Henderson.

In most cases, each section is self contained. However, on some occasions there have been crossovers within the stories, for example, the Alderman appearing at a Jeremy Corbyn rally and Peter Beardsley featuring in episodes of Gangs of the EPL.

== Themes ==
Each episode of Athletico Mince uses a traditional oriental folk music track for the intro and as a bridge between sections of the podcast. In the first episode Andy explains the music "is to send a message to our Far East listeners". As such, the theme music is an ongoing satirical jibe at Premier League clubs who portray themselves as "global" clubs in order to promote their brand in Asian markets.

As the show has progressed the focus and themes within the podcasts have evolved. While football began as the sole focus of the show, numerous other areas have become important areas of discussion.

Prior to the start of Athletico Mince, Bob underwent heart surgery that saved his life. A running joke in many of the episodes involves Bob questioning Andy as to why he hasn't bothered to ask about his health. With Andy living in Sunderland, and Bob having moved to the more affluent south of England from Middlesbrough, a lot of the humour is based on the social standing of the hosts with Dawson portrayed as a lower class, run-down character and Mortimer as a pompous millionaire who has servants and/or slaves.

== Other media ==
In April 2017 Dawson released The World of Football According to Athletico Mince.

Animated versions of the songs, themes and stories have been made available online and used during the live shows. Fan-made instrumental versions of the songs have been used in later episodes.

Certain performances of the 2020 live tour were postponed due to the COVID-19 outbreak.

The episode artwork for the first 50 episodes was illustrated by artist and designer Ben Brignell.

The chief animator for the podcast is graphic designer @benpics. His cartoon work and animation blends caricature and observation to add another dimension to the podcast.

== Reception ==
The podcast has received a largely positive response from both critics and fans with many enjoying its use of football as a theme, without listeners having to be avid followers of the sport. There has also been praise for Mortimer due to his performances without his comedy partner Vic Reeves, yet still in keeping with his surreal style. In an interview with Mortimer, Joe Zadeh from Vice quipped that the podcast "from episode one...derailed immediately from its intended topic of football, and has since become a bizarre and engrossing world of idle chat, improvised tales and sketches that often prolapse mid-joke".

Bruce Dessau from The London Evening Standard stated "This is distinctly daft comedy, full of in-jokes, catchphrases and occasional songs. It evokes Viz comic as much as comic Vic Reeves, yet Athletico Mince is very much a winner in its own right."

In The Guardian's countdown of the 50 best podcasts of 2016, Gwilym Mumford named his favourite episode as "Steve’s Restaurant Showdown, which features a surreal Scottish folk tale from Mortimer that rivals anything he’s managed as part of Reeves and Mortimer."
