= Richard Fielder (writer) =

American television producer and writer (1925–2020)

Richard Fielder (April 13, 1925 – July 22, 2020) was an American television writer.

== Career ==
Richard Fielder had a career spanning from the 1950s to the 1990s, during which he wrote for over 59 television shows and film projects. He worked as a writer for The Waltons, Gunsmoke, Seven Brides for Seven Brothers, and two episodes of The Alfred Hitchcock Hour, (See "Night of the Owl" at IMDb and "To Catch a Butterfly" at IMDb). He also wrote the mini-series North and South and George Washington.

His papers are located within the American Heritage Center at the university of Wyoming.
