= Binbit =

Mobile entertainment company

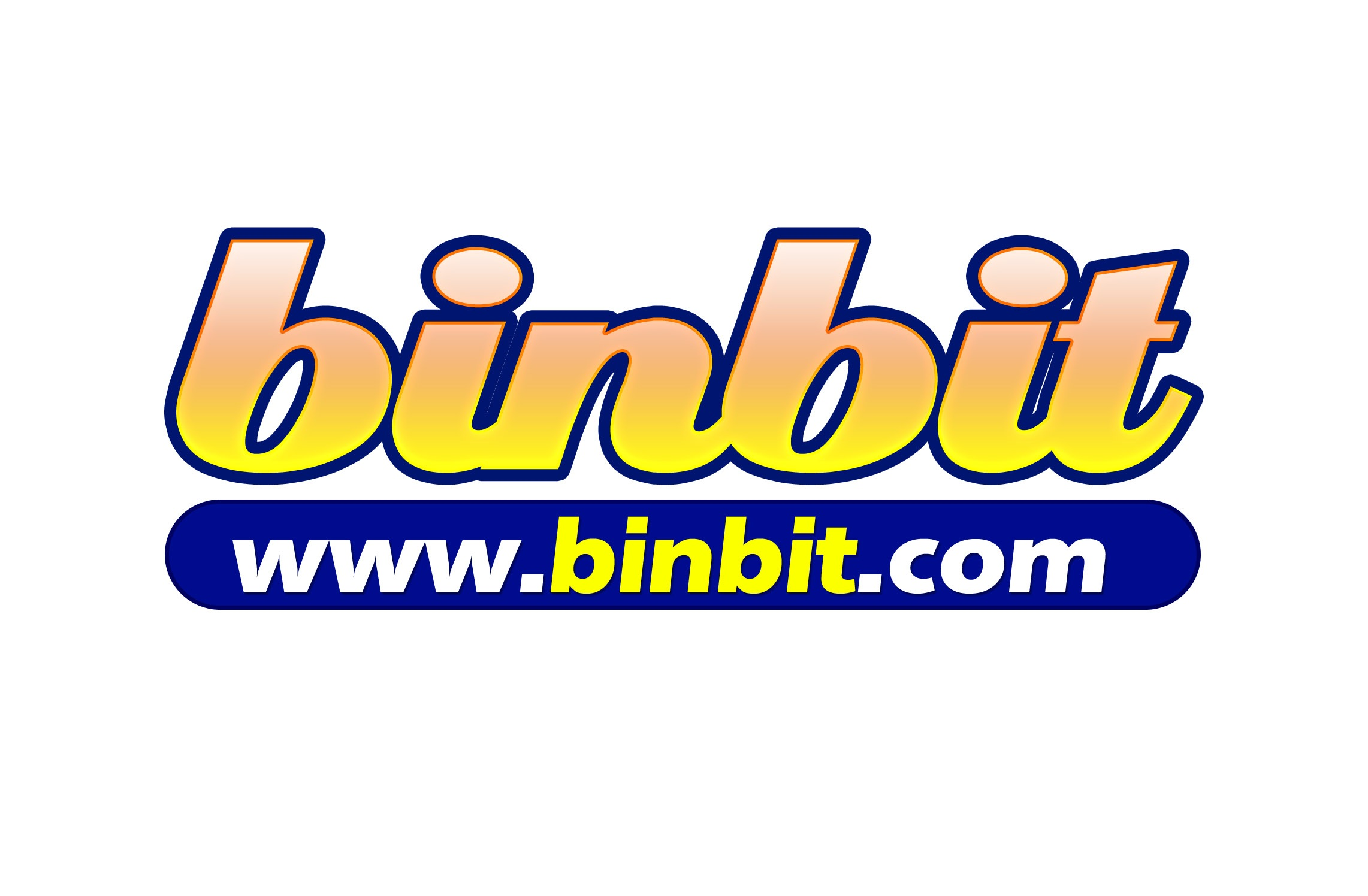
Binbit logo

Binbit is a provider of mobile entertainment serving Mexico and countries throughout Asia, Africa, and Central and South America.

== History ==
Binbit was founded in September 2005 in Monterrey, Mexico, delivering mobile entertainment services internationally. A few months later the company established its first office in Panama, entering the international market, later expanding into Argentina, Bolivia, Colombia, Chile, Costa Rica, Ecuador, Guatemala, Nicaragua, Peru, Paraguay, and El Salvador.

In 2009, Binbit became the leader in mobile entertainment in Latin America.

Also in 2009, Binbit was nominated in the “Best D2D Service” category for the 2009 Meffys Awards of the Mobile Entertainment Forum.

And by the end of 2009, the company begins operations in two new continents by acquiring Atinco South Africa, and ACME Mobile in Indonesia, Malaysia, Philippines, Singapore, Thailand, and Vietnam.

In 2010 Binbit was operating on three continents and had begun operations in the Dominican Republic and Honduras.

== Controversy ==
Despite Russia's invasion of Ukraine in 2022, Binbit continues its operations in Russia.
