= User-generated TV =

User-Generated Television or UGTV refers to TV footage that was originally created by a member of the public and then uploaded to the internet. Often the process of selecting such footage for broadcast includes the input of web users. UGTV can refer to TV show content or to advertisements.

== UGTV firsts ==
The first TV show containing UGTV was an experimental show ZeD, broadcast by CBC, Canada’s national publicly funded broadcasting company. The show ran from 2002-2006.

The first TV show that runs completely on UGTV is Outloud.TV. The show started in August 2003 as a student project on Amsterdam local TV and is currently still running as a project by the Outloud.TV Foundation in Amsterdam.

Outloud.TV is also the first show that locates the broadcast timeslots automatically and 100% democratic based upon the Outloud.TV user communities votes.

The first TV network based around UGTV is Current TV, which was set up by Al Gore and businessman Joel Hyatt in 2004. Current relies on UGTV for about one third of its content.

The first UGTV advert broadcast on American national TV was a spot for Sony created by Tyson Ibele, an 18-year-old from Minneapolis. It was first broadcast in May 2006.

== Other UGTV examples ==
Trouble, a UK satellite and cable channel, has been, since April 2006, regularly broadcasting clips that have been uploaded to its Trouble Homegrown website.

NBC and YouTube announced an alliance in June 2006 part of which will see NBC broadcasting select YouTube clips.

Sumo TV launched a fully integrated TV & web platform in July 2006, allowing users to upload video clips for broadcast onto the UK SKY satellite network. The channel also employs user-generated broadcasting by allowing users to build their own shows, which are broadcast within the channel's live virtual studio.

MTV launched a new, viewer-controlled channel called MTV Flux on August 1, 2006. On the channel, UGTV was shown in addition to professional content selected by web users. However it was soon closed and MTV is relaunching a different service simply called "Flux", based on their Italian office's website.

== See also ==
- User-generated content
- Web 2.0
