= Andy Dawson (podcaster) =

British freelance writer and podcaster

Andy Dawson is a British freelance writer and podcaster.

Dawson has written for The Guardian and The Daily Mirror. He is the author of the book Get in the Sea: An apoplectic guide to modern living.

Dawson regularly appeared on Talksport with Sam Delaney on the show The Warm Up. Dawson has competed with Mark Lawrenson on the BBC Sport website football scores prediction game.

Dawson is the co-host of comedy podcast Athletico Mince with comedian Bob Mortimer which takes an irreverent look at the world of football and beyond and which has also spawned multiple live shows and a book.

Dawson has co-hosted the podcast Top Flight Time Machine since March 2018 alongside broadcaster, journalist and West Ham United F.C. fan Sam Delaney (born 1975). Dawson and Delaney have held multiple live show tours of the podcast around the UK.

Dawson courted controversy in May 2020 when he tweeted that he wanted to “pay hard cash to chase the ****** down the street and boot him in the balls” in front of his children in reference to Conservative MP and government minister Michael Gove over the government's handling of the Dominic Cummings lockdown breach during the COVID-19 pandemic, which met a mixed response. Dawson received a Police Caution for Malicious Communication. He subsequently deleted his Twitter account before reactivating it.

== Personal life ==
Dawson is from Sunderland in the North-East of England, and is a life-long supporter of Sunderland A.F.C.

Dawson has two children.
