= Great! TV =

British general entertainment channel owned by Narrative Entertainment UK Limited

GREAT! TV
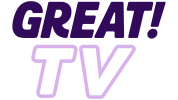
- Country: United Kingdom

Programming
- Language: English
- Picture format: 16:9 576i SDTV
- Timeshift service: Great! TV +1

Ownership
- Owner: Sony Pictures Television (2011–21); Narrative Entertainment UK Limited (2021–present)
- Sister channels: Great! Action; Great! Mystery; Great! Romance

History
- Launched: 7 April 2011; 15 years ago (original); 10 September 2019; 7 years ago (relaunch); 25 May 2021; 5 years ago (as Great! TV)
- Replaced: True Entertainment (relaunch)
- Closed: 6 February 2018; 8 years ago (original)
- Replaced by: Sony Crime Channel (original)
- Former names: Sony Entertainment Television (2011–16); Sony Channel (2016–2018 and 2019–2021)

Links
- Website: Great! Player

Availability

Terrestrial
- Freeview: Channel 34

Great! TV is a British television channel in the United Kingdom owned by Narrative Entertainment UK Limited. It originally launched as Sony Entertainment Television on 7 April 2011. However, it was closed on 6 February 2018 and replaced by Sony Crime Channel. It was brought back for a second time on 10 September 2019 when it replaced True Entertainment, inheriting some of its programming. Following Narrative Capital's acquisition of Sony's channels in May 2021, it was rebranded as Great! TV.

== History ==
=== As original channel (2011-2018) ===
BT agreed a deal with Sony Pictures Television to offer its programming on-demand on BT Vision from 1 March 2010. The move marked Sony's debut in the UK market, over a year ahead of the launch of the Sony Entertainment Television channel. Sony Entertainment Television also appeared on TalkTalk TV during the YouView platform launch in 2012, but was later removed.

Sony Pictures Television acquired channel 157 on Sky's EPG, previously owned by Film 24, in November 2010. A one-hour timeshift channel was also available from launch after the purchase of Open Access 3's Sky EPG slot on channel 190. Both Film 24 and Open Access 3 closed on 4 April 2011, to make way for previews of Sony Entertainment Television. On 15 December 2011, Sony Entertainment Television was added to Virgin Media. On 2 April 2012, Sony Entertainment Television +1 moved to Current TV's former Sky EPG slot on channel 183, with channel 190 used to launch Men&Movies +1. On 3 July 2012, Sony Entertainment Television +1 moved to channel 181.

The channel was rebranded as Sony Channel on 12 January 2016, but closed on 6 February 2018 to be replaced by Sony Crime Channel on Sky and Virgin Media. The last programme on the channel was an episode of Saving Hope.

=== As relauched channel (2019-2021) ===
On 24 July 2019, it was announced that Sony Channel would be relaunched and would replace its predecessor True Entertainment from 10 September 2019. The channel replaced True Entertainment on all platforms (Freeview 48, Sky 157, Freesat 142, Virgin 189), with the last programme shown on True Entertainment being an episode of Highway to Heaven.

=== As Great! TV (2021-present) ===
Due to Narrative Capital acquiring SPT's full UK portfolio on 14 May 2021, the 4 Sony-branded free-to-air channels in the UK adopted the Great! branding on 25 May 2021. As a result, the channel was rebranded as Great! TV.

On 21 June 2023, Great! TV moved from a local TV multiplex on Freeview to the COM6 multiplex, thereby making the channel more widely available in more areas on Freeview.

On 20 November 2024, Great! TV +1 was replaced by the Great! Player streaming service on Freeview channel 63.

On 19 August 2026, it was announced that Pop, along with Great! TV and the other Great! channels will be added to TiVo devices.

== Programming ==
=== Original ===
The original Sony Channel was aimed at women aged between 25 and 54 and broadcast a range of dramas and comedies, including Hawthorne, Huff, and 'Til Death. Sony Entertainment Television also brought UK series Hustle and Hotel Babylon, along with the last season of Las Vegas and reruns of Crossing Jordan, Dawson's Creek, My Boys, Ned and Stacey, and NewsRadio. It also showed movies from SET's parent company Sony Pictures Entertainment, such as The Da Vinci Code, All the King's Men, Marie Antoinette, and Philadelphia. From September 2011, Holby City began airing on Sony Entertainment Television.

On 16 May 2012, Sony Entertainment Television began showing BBC Spy drama Spooks from series 1. It was announced on 2 August 2012, that Sony Entertainment Television acquired the rights to broadcast Hot in Cleveland in the UK and Ireland, and it showed season 3 on 14 September 2012, season 1 and season 2 had already been broadcast on Sky Living. The channel also broadcast the American sitcom Community, ITV's Secret Diary of a Call Girl and the BBC's highly successful Ashes to Ashes and Life on Mars. The channel started to broadcast the UK TV premieres of various other programmes including The Night Shift, Saving Hope, Younger, Satisfaction and Orange Is the New Black. Paranormal content on the former channel included Ghost Hunters, Ghost Hunters International and Celebrity Ghost Stories. In 2017, the channel began to broadcast repeats of America's Got Talent.

=== Relaunch ===
The relaunched Sony Channel (which later became Great! TV) retained some programming from its predecessor channel, True Entertainment, but added more Sony-owned programmes to the schedule.

== Great! Real ==
GREAT! Real
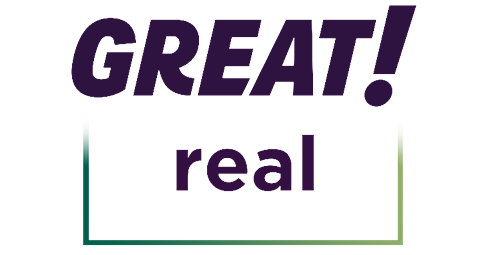
- Country: United Kingdom

Programming
- Language: English
- Picture format: 16:9 576i or 1080i
- Timeshift service: Great! Real +1

Ownership
- Owner: Narrative Entertainment UK Limited

History
- Launched: March 20, 2024; 2 years ago (linear channel); October 2024; 2 years ago (FAST)
- Replaced: Tiny Pop
- Closed: August 20, 2024; 2 years ago (linear channel); August 2025; 1 month ago (FAST)

Great! Real (stylized as GREAT! real) was a British free-to-air television channel owned by Narrative Entertainment UK Limited which launched in 20 March 2024 and served as a replacement for Tiny Pop on Freeview, Freesat, Sky and Virgin.

=== History ===
In February 2024, it was announced that Narrative Entertainment UK Limited would launch a new channel concept called Great! Real in March, featuring reality television content. The network launched test transmissions on 5 March 2024, before an official launch of 20 March, replacing Tiny Pop, which would move to online-only distribution.

The service would only last five months before closing on 20 August 2024 to make way for the return of Tiny Pop to terrestrial distribution. It later returned in October as a FAST channel service, which lasted until August 2025, ending the "Great! Real" Brand after 1 year of its existence.
