= Great! Action =

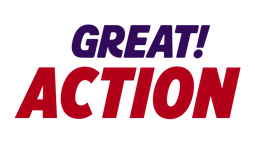
- Country: United Kingdom
- Broadcast area: United Kingdom; Ireland

Programming
- Timeshift service: Great! Action +1

Ownership
- Owner: Sony Pictures Television (2019–2021); Narrative Entertainment UK Limited (2021–present)
- Sister channels: Great! TV; Great! Mystery; Great! Romance

History
- Launched: 10 September 2019; 6 years ago
- Replaced: Movies4Men
- Former names: Sony Movies Action (2019–2021); Great! Movies Action (2021–2023)

Links
- Website: greatnetwork.com/action

Availability

Terrestrial
- Freeview: Channel 62

Great! Action (stylized as GREAT! action) is a British free-to-air TV channel owned by Narrative Entertainment UK Limited which launched as Sony Movies Action on 10 September 2019 on Freeview, Freesat, Sky and Virgin. Sony Movies Action replaced Movies4Men, which was dedicated to showing action, war and western movies as well as showing classic action television series. However, apart from a few 5 minute shorts (such as Soccer Bites or Movie News) Great! Action is now devoted to showing films.

== History ==
This channel replaced Movies4Men and Movies4Men +1. Sony Movies Action is available on Freeview, Freesat, Sky and Virgin, but the timeshift service Sony Movies Action +1 is only on Sky. Sony Movies Action +1, launched on 25 February 2008, was briefly on Freeview back when it was still known as Movies4Men +1. The channel launched on 13 May 2019 on Freeview channel 48, but was closed the next month because True Entertainment (now Sony Channel) and True Movies (now Sony Movies Classic) were moving to the Local Multiplex. Movies4Men moved to 325 on Sky on May 3, 2012, but moved back to 323 on May 1, 2018, after 6 years.

The Sony Movies Action channel was first announced on 24 July 2019, when Movies4Men would be replaced by Sony Movies Action.

On 14 May 2021, Narrative Capital announced its acquisition of Sony Pictures Television's UK channels; the channel was rebranded as Great! Movies Action eleven days later.

On 22 March 2023, Great! Movies Action was rebranded as Great! Action, following the launch of sister channel Great! Romance.

By August 2024, the channel had diversified from being purely a movie channel to one that had started to show more reality TV series during the early evening. These programmes had been series that Narrative Entertainment had been showing on sister channel Great! Real, which is expected to close.

=== Logos ===
+1 variant (10 September 2019 - 4 January 2021)

(10 September 2019 - 4 January 2021)

=== Great! Action programmes ===
- Air Rescue (from Great! Real)
- Coast Guard Alaska (from Great! Real)
- Cops Uncut (from Great! Real)
- Police Ten 7(from Great! Real)
- The Stuka (documentary)
- This Week Back Then

== Great! Real ==
Great! Real was launched on 20 March 2024 on Freeview's local TV multiplex by Narrative Entertainment. Appearing on Freeview channel 61 and Sky channel 189, the unscripted reality channel was not launched on either Virgin Media or Freesat. On 20 August 2024, the channel was removed from Sky, with a number of programmes from Great! Real being moved over to Great! Action.

=== Great! Real programmes ===
- Air Rescue (moved to Great! Action!)
- Airline USA
- Coast Guard Alaska (moved to Great! Action!)
- Coast Guard Pacific Northwest
- Code 1: Extreme
- Cops Uncut (moved to Great! Action!)
- Emergency Rescue: Air, Land and Sea
- Heathrow: Britain’s Busiest Airport (formally on ITV)
- Island Medics
- Paddington Station 24/7
- Police Ten 7 (moved to Great! Action!)
- Thief Trackers
