= Sumo TV =

TV channel

- Country: United Kingdom

Ownership
- Owner: Cellcast Group

History
- Launched: 28 November 2006
- Closed: 21 August 2012
- Replaced by: Horror Channel
- Former names: You TV (2002-2006)

Sumo TV was a free-to-air television channel owned by Cellcast Group. On 1 July 2006, You TV was relabelled as Sumo TV. Sumo TV was officially launched on 28 November 2006, claiming to be the world's first user-content TV channel. Through their website and programming blocks on other TV channels, Sumo TV also had operations in America, Asia, Europe and the Middle East, with a showcase of local content.

Every time a clip was broadcast, the originator of the content received a percentage of the revenues generated. The channel was criticised by Ofcom for putting too much responsibility for complying with the broadcasting code on the creators of user-generated clips rather than performing sufficient checks themselves.

On 25 October 2007, James Brown was hired as Sumo TV's creative and editorial director, Brown introduced a dozen new programmes.

On 27 March 2008, it was announced that Cellcast had sold Sumo TV and Sumo TV +1's EPG slots to Discovery for £1.4m as well as receiving a slot further down the Entertainment category of the EPG. Later in the year Sumo TV moved to the Adult category followed by the Gaming and Dating category allowing them to broadcast content from Cellcast's adult channels at night. Sumo TV returned to the Entertainment category on 25 November 2008 with programming from Psychic Television as well as archive footage.

On 21 August 2012, Sumo TV closed and was replaced with a simulcast of the Horror Channel on Sky channel 198.
