= Movies4Men =

- Country: United Kingdom

Programming
- Language(s): English
- Timeshift service: Movies4Men +1

Ownership
- Owner: Dolphin Broadcast Services (2006–2012); Sony Pictures Television (2012–2019)

History
- Launched: 1 February 2006; 19 years ago
- Replaced: Matinee Movies
- Closed: 10 September 2019; 5 years ago
- Replaced by: Sony Movies Action

Movies4Men (stylized as movies4men) was a free-to-air film channel in the United Kingdom and Ireland. It was available on Freeview, Freesat and Sky. The channel was aimed at the middle to old aged male demographic, with a look at the classics in cinema history, focusing mainly on western and war film genres. The channel ceased operations on 10 September 2019 and was replaced with Sony Movies Action.

== Availability and transmission history ==
Between May 2011 and January 2012, Movies4Men was also available on Freeview in Greater Manchester, Movies4Men +1 had also been made available from November 2011 but closed at the same time. On 19 September 2012, both channels returned to Freeview in the area, and launched nationwide on Freeview on 1 April 2014.

Dolphin Broadcast Services Ltd acquired the daytime matinee movies service from sit-up Ltd, which was re-branded as the 24-hour Movies4Men on 1 February 2006. On 19 January 2012 Dolphin Broadcast Services Ltd was itself purchased by Sony Pictures Television and merged into Sony Pictures Television’s existing UK networks business. Sony Pictures Television also took a majority stake in Dolphin’s advertising sales business.

Movies4Men was joined by its sister channel Movies4Men 2 on 9 October 2006, which transmitted other types of cinematic genres until it closed on 2 May 2012. As of September 2008, the channels transmit films in 16:9 widescreen where available.

On 25 February 2008, Movies4Men +1 launched on Sky 326 as a timeshift channel, showing all Movies4Men films one hour later.

On 24 July 2019, it was announced that the channel would be closed and will be replaced by Sony Movies Action from 10 September 2019.

== Film screenings ==
The channel screened mainly western, war and action films, but also film noir. Most of the films were from the Golden Hollywood and New Hollywood era. It often screened films together during one day, morning or evening as part of a theme, of which included the theme and the "4Men" in the title, such as "Westerns4Men" or "War4Men", mostly commonly. The channel also occasionally screened successive films from a typically masculine actor, such as Dolph Lundgren or Robert Mitchum. On 27 February 2017 the channel featured a "Mitchum on Monday" theme, screening film noir films of his such as Build My Gallows High (Out of the Past) (1947), The Racket (1951), The Locket (1946) and Second Chance (1953) in the morning. Other examples of films shown on the channel include A.W.O.L., A Bullet for the General, Django, Gregory's Girl, Saints and Soldiers, She Wore a Yellow Ribbon, Shout at the Devil, The Bunker and Tunes of Glory.
