= Pitch TV =

- Country: United Kingdom
- Broadcast area: United Kingdom; Ireland

Programming
- Picture format: SDTV

Ownership
- Owner: Pitch World Ltd.

History
- Closed: 22 May 2013
- Replaced by: Armchair Shop

Links
- Website: www.pitch.tv

Pitch TV was a home shopping television channel broadcast in the United Kingdom on the Freesat and Sky platforms.

Viewers could order products by phone and online. The channel operated as a traditional shopping channel in that the items were sold at a fixed price and not auctioned or reduced.

In August 2009, Pitch TV temporarily ceased broadcasting after parent company Pitchwell Group went into liquidation. The sales order line of the channel ceased on 10 August, with a statement posted on channel's website confirming that the company had gone bust on 24 August. In the statement, the firm claimed that the situation was due to "unreasonable steps taken from Lloyds bank which ultimately brought the business to a standstill".

Programming from JML continued to broadcast in its place for a time. On 30 September 2009, Pitch TV and Pitch World returned to Sky under the ownership of Pitch World Limited. Pitch TV was removed from Freesat channel 803 on 28 August 2009 before being re-added on 1 October 2009.

On 12 April 2013, Pitch World Limited entered administration, sister channel Pitch World was replaced by Discount TV from TV Discount Store Limited on 1 May. Pitch TV was replaced by Armchair Shop from Tristar Media UK Limited on 22 May 2013.
