= Pitch World =

- Country: United Kingdom
- Broadcast area: United Kingdom; Ireland

Programming
- Picture format: SDTV

Ownership
- Owner: Pitch World Ltd.
- Sister channels: Pitch TV

History
- Closed: 1 May 2013
- Replaced by: Discount TV
- Former names: Pitch Plus

Links
- Website: www.pitch.tv

Pitch World was a home shopping television channel broadcast in the United Kingdom and Ireland on the Freesat and Sky platforms.

Pitch World (which was formerly known as Pitch Plus) acted as a sister channel to Pitch TV. The channel operated 24 hours a day and offered items for sale that could be bought by phone or online. The channel shares its shopping website with Pitch TV.

In August 2009, Pitch World temporarily ceased broadcasting after parent company Pitchwell Group went into liquidation. The sales order line of the channel ceased on 10 August, with a statement posted on the channel's website confirming that the company had gone bust on 24 August. In the statement, the firm claimed that the situation was due to "unreasonable steps taken by Lloyds bank which ultimately brought the business to a standstill".

Programming from JML continued to broadcast in its place for a time. On 30 September 2009, Pitch TV and Pitch World returned to Sky under the ownership of Pitch World Limited. Pitch World was removed from Freesat channel 804 on 28 August 2009 before being re-added on 1 October 2009.

On 12 April 2013, Pitch World Limited entered administration and the channel was replaced by Discount TV from TV Discount Store Limited on 1 May. Pitch TV was replaced by Armchair Shop from Tristar Media UK Limited on 22 May 2013.
