= List of programmes broadcast by Channel One =

This is a list of television programs that was broadcast by Virgin1 (later known as Channel One) in the United Kingdom and Ireland. The schedule for Virgin1/Channel One consisted of a mixture of British and American comedy, drama and factual programming, both acquired and commissioned. The channel was pitched between male-targeted channel Bravo and female-targeted channel Living. In addition to exclusive content, Channel One also showed some content from Living, Bravo and Challenge.

== Former programming ==
- 100 Men Own My Breasts
- 1000 Ways To Die
- 8 Out of 10 Cats
- American Inventor
- America's Next Top Model
- Amsterdam Nights
- ....And Proud
- Armed & Dangerous: Ultimate Forces
- Auntie’s Smalls
- Babylon 5
- Battlestar Galactica
- Beach Patrol
- The Best of Beadle's About
- Big Trouble in Thailand
- BingoLotto
- Blade: The Series
- Blood Ties
- Blues and Twos
- Body in Numbers
- Booze Britain
- Boston Legal
- The Bransons: Come Hell or High Water
- Brits Behind Bars
- Brit Cops: Frontline Crime
- Brit Cops: Law and Disorder
- Brit Cops: Rapid Response
- Brit Cops: War on Crime
- Brit Cops: Zero Tolerance
- Britain's Worst...
- The British Suck in Bed
- Bullseye
- Caribbean Cops
- Catchphrase
- Celebrity Who Wants to Be a Millionaire?
- Challenge Jackpot
- Chubby Children
- Chuck
- City In Fear
- Classic Who Wants to Be a Millionaire?
- The Cosby Show
- Crime Invasion: Britain's New Underworld
- Criminal Minds
- The Crystal Maze
- Danny Dyer's Deadliest Men
- Deadliest Warrior
- Death Defying Rescues
- Death Row Dogs
- Defectors
- Desperate Learners Driving School
- Cops on Camera
- Dog the Bounty Hunter
- Don't Try This At Home
- Driving Me Mad
- Duncan Bannatyne's Seaside Rescue
- Eleventh Hour
- ....Envy
- Eurotrash
- Exposed
- Extraordinary Humans
- Extreme
- Extremely Out Of Control
- Fear Factor UK
- Fort Boyard
- Four Weddings
- The Fresh Prince of Bel-Air
- Gadgets Gadgets Gadgets
- Gamepad
- Gameshow Gold
- Gethin Jones' Danger Hunters
- Ghost Whisperer
- Gladiators
- Happy Birthday Viagra
- Help Me Help You
- High Seas, High Stakes
- The Hoff: When Scott Came to Stay
- Home Improvement
- Home Video Heroes
- Hustle
- I Sleep With Strangers
- I Want to Work for Diddy
- Ibiza
- In Harm's Way
- Inferno 999
- The Inside Man
- Is That a Nail in Your Head?
- It's Always Sunny in Philadelphia
- It's Not What You Know
- The Jerry Springer Show
- Justice
- The Kill Point
- Knight Rider
- The Krypton Factor
- L.A. Law
- Lawless Britain
- Leverage
- The Life & Times of Tim
- Life on Mars
- Lois & Clark: The New Adventures of Superman
- MacIntyre: World's Toughest Towns
- Masters of Science Fiction
- Medium
- The Monster Hunter
- Monster Jam
- Moonlight
- Most Daring
- Most Haunted
- Most Haunted Live!
- Most Shocking
- Motorway Patrol
- My Holiday Hostage Hell
- My Shocking Story
- My Wife and Kids
- Naked Office
- Ninja Warrior
- Nothing to Declare
- Now See This
- The Outer Limits
- Police Beat
- The Prisoner: X
- Private Practice
- Pyramid Game with Donny Osmond
- Quantum Leap
- The Real Exorcist
- The Real Football Factories
- Restaurant in Our Living Room
- The Riches
- Road to V
- Room 101
- Seinfeld
- The Sex Life of Twins
- Sexarama
- Sexcetera
- Shooting Stars
- Sin Cities
- Space Precinct
- Special Forces
- Stake Out
- Star Trek (The Next Generation, Deep Space Nine, Voyager and Enterprise)
- Street Crime UK
- Sun, Sea and A&E
- Supernatural
- Take It Or Leave It
- Take Me To The Edge
- Takeshi's Castle
- Terminator: The Sarah Connor Chronicles
- That '70s Show
- TNA Impact!
- To the Manor Bowen
- Top Chef
- Trauma
- Travel Sick
- Trawlers, Rigs & Rescue: North Sea
- TV Scrabble
- The Ultimate Fighter
- Unbeatable Banzuke
- The Unit
- V
- Verminators
- Virgin 1 Presents....
- Virgin Media Shorts
- Warehouse 13
- What Were You Thinking?
- When Sport Goes Bad
- Why Men Watch Porn
- World's Most Amazing Videos
- World's Most Shocking Police Videos
- The X-Files
