= List of programmes broadcast by Bravo (British TV channel) =

This is a list of television programmes that were broadcast on the British cable television channel Bravo from 1985 to 2011.

== Summary ==
The schedule for Bravo mainly consisted of a mixture of American and British comedy, drama and factual programming. The channel was targeted towards a male audience ranging from the 25 to 45 age group. The channel also showed commissioned content from other Virgin Media Television channels as well as its own commissioned programmes on both Bravo and Bravo 2.

== Former programming (originally shown by others) ==
- 10 Things You Didn't Know About
- 12 oz. Mouse
- 1000 Ways to Die
- Adult Swim
- Affliction: Day of Reckoning
- Airwolf
- Alias
- America's Hardest Bounty Hunters
- Amsterdam Nights
- Aqua Teen Hunger Force
- Automan
- A-Z of Bad Boys
- Barbershop
- Battle Dome
- Battlestar Galactica
- Beavis and Butt-Head
- Blade: The Series
- Blues and Twos (also shown on Bravo 2)
- Booze Britain (also shown on Bravo 2)
- Britain's Toughest Towns
- Brit Cops
- Brits Behind Bars: America's Toughest Jail
- Buck Rogers in the 25th Century
- Caribbean Cops
- Car Sharks
- Chuck
- Cold Squad
- Cops (also shown on Bravo 2)
- Cops, Cars & Superstars I (also shown on Bravo 2)
- Cops, Cars & Superstars II (also shown on Bravo 2)
- Cops, Cars & Superstars III (also shown on Bravo 2)
- Cops Uncut
- Costa Del Street Crime
- Dan August
- Dante
- Day Break
- Disorderly Conduct: Cops on Camera
- Dog the Bounty Hunter
- ECW Hardcore TV
- ECW on TNN
- Edgar Wallace
- Excel Saga
- Extreme: Animal Attacks
- Flash Gordon's Trip to Mars
- Football Italia
- Football Saved My Life
- Gamepad
- Gamer.tv
- Gamer's Guide to:
- Highway Patrol
- Hogan's Heroes
- Hulk Hogan's Celebrity Championship Wrestling
- In Your Face
- I Predict a Riot
- It's Always Sunny in Philadelphia
- King of Cars
- Knight Rider
- Laid Bare
- Leverage
- Life on Mars
- Loving You
- MacGyver
- Man's Work
- Masters of Horror
- Monster Jam
- Moral Orel
- Most Shocking
- Motorway (also shown on Bravo 2)
- Motorway Patrol (also shown on Bravo 2)
- Night Stalker
- Playr
- Police Beat (also shown on Bravo 2)
- Protect and Serve (also shown on Bravo 2)
- Real TV (Also Shown on Bravo 2)
- Robotica
- Robot Wars
- Roger Ramjet
- Saber of London
- Sexcetera
- Sin Cities
- Space Ghost Coast to Coast
- Space Precinct
- Spartacus: Blood and Sand
- Spider-Man
- Star Trek: Deep Space Nine
- Star Trek: The Next Generation
- Star Trek: Voyager
- Starsky and Hutch
- Street Crime UK (also shown on Bravo 2)
- Street Hawk
- Sun, Sea and A&E
- That '70s Show
- The A-Team
- The Brittas Empire
- The Burning Zone
- The Doris Day Show
- The Dudesons
- The Dukes of Hazzard
- The Fall Guy
- The Kill Point
- The Mod Squad
- The Persuaders!
- The PJs
- The Twilight Zone
- The Ultimate Fighter
- The Unit
- The X-Files
- Thunderbirds
- TNA Epics
- TNA iMPACT!
- Towers of London
- Travel Sick
- Walker, Texas Ranger
- WCW Nitro
- WCW Thunder
- When Games Attack (also shown on Bravo 2)
- When Good Pets Go Bad
- When Sports Go Bad: Wacked Out!
- World's Most Amazing Videos (also shown on Bravo 2)
