= Police Camera Action! =

British television series

- Presented by: Alastair Stewart (1994–2009); Adrian Simpson (2007–2009); Gethin Jones (2010)
- Country of origin: United Kingdom
- Original language: English
- No. of series: 14
- No. of episodes: 95 (list of episodes)

Production
- Producers: Optomen Television; Carlton Television (1994–2002)

Original release
- Network: ITV
- Release: 7 September 1994 – 18 August 2010

Related
- Police Stop!

Police Camera Action! is a police video programme made by Optomen Television, originally broadcast on ITV with repeats airing on ITV4. It was originally commissioned through Carlton Television.

It was presented by Alastair Stewart from 1994 until 2002, until his second drink-driving conviction led to a temporary suspension, before he resumed his role with Adrian Simpson from 2007 until its cancellation three years later. In 2010, the final series of the programme was presented by Gethin Jones.

== History ==
Logo from the original 1994 series

The first episode broadcast on 7 September 1994 was known as Police Stop!, which is also the name of a similar police programme available initially on VHS video and later on Sky1. To date, it is the only episode not to be repeated on Men & Motors or ITV4. A spin-off book of the series was released in 1996 by Ebury Press, which was written by Peter Gillbe with a foreword by Alastair Stewart and which featured police footage of bad driving. The book had some footage stills that were not shown in the TV episodes.

In 2003, the programme was suspended owing to Stewart's second drink-driving conviction when he was found to have crashed into a telegraph pole while three times over the legal limit. This delayed transmission of some unaired episodes until 17 January 2006. The programme resumed with Stewart introducing the series from a studio on 24 September 2007, joined by Adrian Simpson, who reported on location and provided voice-overs to the clips. A week before the new series began, there was a special "Ultimate Pursuits/Best of Police Camera Action!" edition, presented by Stewart.

The last ever series was aired from 29 July to 18 August 2010, presented by Gethin Jones.

== Format ==
Each episode has a subtitle relating to the type of police video footage such as "Safety Last" or "Driven to Distraction". It typically features police footage and occasional media footage relating to bad driving and road crime. However, this has not always been so, with special episodes "The Liver Run" (featuring the Metropolitan Police undertaking an organ transplant escort) and "The Man Who Shot OJ", focusing on the work of helicopter camera operator and pilot Zoey Tur in Los Angeles. This episode also looked at the controversies behind the O. J. Simpson trial. In later series, footage from Tur and their Los Angeles News Service would feature more prominently in certain episodes.

== See also ==
- Police Stop! – programme released on VHS and later broadcast on Sky1 with a similar format.
- Road Wars – seen as the replacement to Police Stop! and runs to a similar format to the more recent Police, Camera, Action! episodes.
- Street Law – also known as Street Wars. Broadcast on Sky1, Sky2, and Pick TV.
- Police Interceptors – programme following traffic police in Essex and South Yorkshire. Broadcast on Channel 5.
- Traffic Cops – sometimes broadcast as Motorway Cops or Car Wars. BBC programme with similar format.
- Brit Cops – a police show broadcast on Sky (originally on Bravo and then Virgin1).
- Street Crime UK – a similar show broadcast on Bravo.
- Most Evil Killers – series broadcast on Pick (TV channel)
