= Street Crime UK =

British reality television series

- Narrated by: Susan Rae
- Country of origin: United Kingdom

Production
- Running time: 30 minutes (including adverts)
- Production companies: The Lab (series 1-3); Granada Television (series 4)

Original release
- Network: Bravo
- Release: November 2002 – December 2005

Related
- Brit Cops

Street Crime UK is a reality television series focusing on law enforcement in various parts of the United Kingdom, as police go about their duties on the streets of Britain's towns and cities.

The police officers featuring in episodes discussed work, responding to 999 calls, enforcing public order, raid premises allegedly being used for illegal purposes, pursuing and arresting various suspects, transporting them to the police station after they are arrested. The show was narrated by Susan Rae, who often updated the viewers as to whether the arrested were charged/tried/convicted etc. and sometimes given details of the sentences/penalties that were imposed on them for their lawbreaking, also updating on current events.

Street Crime UK was originally shown on Bravo and was later repeated on Virgin 1 (which was later re-branded Channel One). Series 4 and Christmas Crime UK has also been repeated on Sky One and Pick TV.

The programme also featured police clips, previously broadcast on ITV's reality police series Crimefighters.

Street Crime UK was replaced by Brit Cops: Frontline Crime in 2008.

== Series guide ==
- Series 1: 15 editions first shown from November 2002.
- Series 2: 15 editions first shown from October 2003.
- Series 3: 20 editions first shown September 2004.
- Series 4: 15 editions first shown from 6 June 2005.
- Christmas editions: 5 editions first shown December 2005.

== See also ==
- Brit Cops - Bravo's replacement for Street Crime UK.
- Blues and Twos - ITV, UK Horizons, Bravo, Bravo 2, Virgin1, Watch and Really
- Traffic Cops - Sometimes broadcast as Motorway Cops. BBC One programme which is also repeated on various UKTV channels.
- Police Interceptors - Police series broadcast on Channel 5 following Police ANPR intercept teams.
- Road Wars - Broadcast on Sky1, Sky2 and Pick TV.
- Street Wars - Also known as Street Law. Broadcast on Sky.
- Police, Camera, Action! - A similar programme broadcast on ITV and ITV4.
- Most Evil Killers - Series broadcast on Pick
