= Bravo 2 =

British TV channel

- Country: United Kingdom

Programming
- Picture format: 16:9, 576i (SDTV)

Ownership
- Owner: Living TV Group (Sky plc)
- Sister channels: Bravo

History
- Launched: 2 March 2006; 20 years ago
- Closed: 1 January 2011; 15 years ago
- Replaced by: Sky 3
- Former names: Player (until 28 September 2006)

Bravo 2 (formerly known as Player) was a British television channel. It was the sister channel of Bravo when it rebranded on September 28, 2006, and both channels closed on 1 January 2011.

== History ==
=== Player ===
The channel launched as "Player" on March 2, 2006, being a spin-off to a block that previously aired late-at-night on Challenge. Unlike the block, the channel functioned as a sister to Bravo rather than that of Challenge due to them both heavily focusing on programming aimed at a male audience.

In addition to the already existing gambling-related programming the block offered, the channel also aired sporting programmes, including exclusive coverage of the FIA GT Championship and a limited number of Serie A matches under the production of its sister channel Bravo.

The idents were the same as that of its original late-night slot on Challenge, except the red colouring was swapped out for yellow colouring and without the famous club.

=== Bravo 2 ===
The Player channel proved to be a failure, and on September 21, 2006, Flextech announced that the channel would be rebranded as Bravo 2 on September 28, 2006, to coincide with the main channel's new rebranding.

Bravo 2 kept some of the programming that Player offered, and included programmes from the main channel to the schedule, including The Unit, Street Crime UK, Police Beat, Blues and Twos, The Real Miami Vice, World's Wildest Police Videos, World's Most Amazing Videos, Cops and Superstars, Booze Britain, and The Real Football Factories.

From January 2007, the channel started broadcasting Total Nonstop Action Wrestling programming and was the only channel in the UK which had the exclusive rights for TNA Wrestling programming, which consisted of a two-day delay for the American broadcast TNA weekly show "TNA Impact!" and a three-day delay for TNA's monthly pay-per-views. On 5 January 2008, TNA iMPACT! was moved to Bravo, with replays of the show on Bravo 2. Bravo's original contract for TNA Wrestling Programming was an 18-month contract and was distributed by RDA TV, and the deal was extended on 1 July 2008 for another 18 months which was once again negotiated by RDA TV.

=== Closure ===
On 15 September 2010, BSkyB (now known as Sky UK Limited) announced that it would close Bravo 2 as well as sister channels Bravo and Channel One. The Bravo channels closed on 1 January 2011, with the most popular programmes moved to the other Sky channels. The last image seen on Bravo 2 was the Bravo 2 logo with the words "Bravo 2 doesn't do regret". The last program was World's Most Amazing Videos.
