= Ftn (TV channel) =

Defunct British television channel

FTN

Programming
- Timeshift service: Ftn+1 (Thursday 9 August - Monday 1 October 2007)

Ownership
- Owner: Living TV Group

History
- Launched: 15 January 2003
- Closed: 1 October 2007
- Replaced by: Virgin 1

Availability (at time of closure)

Terrestrial
- Freeview: Channel 20

Ftn (Flextech Television Network) was a digital television channel broadcast in the United Kingdom, which was owned by Virgin Media Television (formerly known as Flextech). The channel broadcast entertainment programmes, commonly sourced from its pay sister channels Living, Bravo, and Challenge, giving Freeview viewers a glimpse of what the pay networks had to offer. The channel broadcast from 6 pm to 6 am every day, timesharing with UK Bright Ideas.

== History ==
The channel was announced on 3 October 2002 as part of the preparation of upcoming networks on the Freeview service. The channel's initial launch programming was announced on 1 January 2003, with a launch prepared for the 15th.

The channel's main purpose was to exist as a highlights network for Flextech to showcase Freeview viewers the programmes from their paid channels. Ftn aired from 6:00pm-6:00am every day, timesharing with UKTV Bright Ideas, a similar highlights network. Despite that, the channel was also available as a subscription network on NTL:Home Digital, Telewest Active Digital and Sky Digital.

=== Relaunch as Virgin1 ===
On 11 June 2007, Virgin Media Television announced that they would launch their flagship network, Virgin1, to rival Sky One, in the autumn. The channel would launch on all major platforms, including Freeview, and would replace Ftn.

On 7 August, as part of the relaunch, Virgin Media television announced that a one-hour timeshift of Ftn would launch on Virgin Media and Sky, with the launch occurring two days later. Despite being a one-hour timeshift, FTN +1 only broadcast from 7 pm until 1 am, as Live Roulette TV which broadcast on FTN from 12 am to 3 am, couldn't be rebroadcast one hour later, for legal reasons.

On 18 September, it was announced that Virgin1 would launch on 1 October. As such, Ftn closed at 6 am on Monday 1 October 2007, with Virgin1 launching at 9:00 pm on the same day.

== Participation TV ==
Previously The Great Big British Quiz broadcast nightly between the hours of 00:00 and 03:00am. (Big Game TV took this spot until April 2007) Between November 2005 and November 2006 Quiz Night Live broadcast from 22.00 - 01.00 daily only to be replaced by Ostrich Media's Quiz Call which ceased broadcasting on FTN on 1 January 2007.

In June 2007, Live Roulette TV began broadcasting on FTN between the hours of midnight and 03:00am.
