= Police Stop! =

British television documentary series

- Genre: Documentary
- Directed by: Bill Rudgard
- Starring: Graham Cole; Insp. David Rowland
- Narrated by: Graham Cole
- Theme music composer: Hugh Mitchell-Dawson
- Country of origin: United Kingdom
- Original language: English
- No. of series: 1
- No. of episodes: 14

Production
- Executive producer: Bill Rudgard
- Producer: Shaie Selzer
- Editor: Roy Wolfe
- Running time: 50 — 80 minutes
- Production company: Labyrinth Media

Original release
- Network: Sky1
- Release: 1 January 1994 – 2001

Related
- Police Camera Action!

Police Stop! is a British television documentary series, narrated and presented by Graham Cole, best known for his role as PC Tony Stamp in the Thames Television drama series The Bill, that was first developed in 1993 as a direct-to-video series by creator Bill Rudgard. The series compiles footage filmed on cameras mounted in police cars and helicopters, with occasional material from road-side or hand-held cameras, with each episode focusing on a different type of road related crime, such as speeding, driving without due care and attention or dangerous overtaking, or in more extreme cases, hazards relating to weather conditions or car chases involving wanted criminals.

Seven episodes were released straight to VHS before a deal was struck with BSkyB to broadcast the series on Sky One, with a new episode to be broadcast each year from 1996 onwards. A total of fourteen episodes were filmed, with the final episode, a special focusing on policing in the United States, airing in 2001. Prior to the broadcast of Police Stop! 5, Sky also broadcast the first four episodes previously released exclusively to VHS. The series also broadcast in the United States on Syndication, which notably resulted in several episodes being cut to remove footage for which clearance rights were unavailable.

The series also spawned an international spin-off, which began broadcasting in New Zealand in 1996. The series aired on TV3, and was fronted by former Australian race car driver Peter Brock. The series' format was similar to the British versions, using footage from both the United Kingdom and United States, with additional content from the New Zealand police. Later series were retitled Police Stop – Caught in the Act, which in addition to car chase footage, also featured footage from security cameras, often from shops or public places. Footage also extended to Brock himself working alongside the New Zealand police, giving an insight into general lines of police work. Although the series concluded in 1998, a special episode was screened in 2006 as a tribute to Brock, a week after he died in a Motorsport accident.

== Broadcast ==
The first episode of Police Stop! was released on video in 1993, and was widely successful, partly due to a campaign run by The Sun, which offered readers a discount when ordered directly from the manufacturer. As such, a second video followed swiftly in April 1994. This is the only episode not to be presented by Graham Cole; instead, it is fronted by Inspector David Rowland, a traffic division inspector from the Metropolitan Police, although the episode was narrated by Cole. Cole returned to voice two episodes focusing on policing in the United States, the first titled Police Stop! America and the second titled Police Stop! Or We'll Shoot, which predominantly focuses on the work of the Texas Rangers. Police Stop! 3 and Police Stop! 4 both followed in 1995, before a compilation video, Worst of Police Stop!, followed in 1996.

Police Stop! and Police Stop! 2 were produced with the co-operation of several British police forces, which contributed most of the material. Aside from the two American specials, Police Stop! 3 and Police Stop! 4 also included material primarily from the United States and mainland Europe. Notably, all seven videos were exempt from classification. From Police Stop! 5 onwards, the series transferred to Sky One, where a new episode was broadcast yearly until 2001. From this point, the series continued to use more clips from non-British sources.

Police Stop! was regularly repeated on Men and Motors and ITV4 during the late 2000s, although the repeats resulted in some confusion for viewers when both channels erroneously listed the series as being presented by Alastair Stewart, confusing it with the former ITV series Police Camera Action!, which Stewart fronted. Notably, only ten of the fourteen episodes were repeated on both channels, with Police Stop! America, Police Stop! Or We'll Shoot, Worst of Police Stop! and Police Stop! 11 remaining unrepeated. Labyrinth Media, which produced the series, also produced two further direct-to-video releases featuring a similar format. Riot Police, released in 1994, features graphic footage of riots, including the riot of March 31, 1990 in Trafalgar Square, London. Real Life Rescues, presented by Alastair Stewart and also released in 1994, features camera footage of real-life rescues involving the emergency services.

== Episodes ==
No.	Title	Presented by	Directed by	Original release date
1	"Police Stop!"	Graham Cole	Bill Rudgard	1 January 1994
Graham Cole introduces us to the worst types of driving on Britain's roads.: Two versions of this episode exist; the normal version is edited for syndication, owing to clearance issues regarding copyright of footage, not censorship purposes.
2	"Police Stop! 2"	Inspector David Rowland	Bill Rudgard	1 April 1994
Three versions of this episode exist; two are edited for syndication, owing to clearance issues regarding copyright of footage, not censorship purposes.
3	"Police Stop! America"	Graham Cole	Bill Rudgard	1 May 1994
A hard hitting look at the police on America's meanest streets, including drug busts, car chases and high speed action.
4	"Police Stop! Or We'll Shoot"	Graham Cole	Unknown	14 November 1994
Graham Cole looks at car chases that have resulted in the police having to threaten the culprits with weapons.
5	"Police Stop! 3"	Graham Cole	Bill Rudgard	8 April 1995
A look at driving internationally, featuring hazards in Australia, South Africa, and the United States.: Two versions of this episode exist; the normal version is edited for syndication, owing to clearance issues regarding copyright of footage, not censorship purposes. The title sequence uses tyre tracks.
6	"Police Stop! 4"	Graham Cole	Bill Rudgard	23 October 1995
All new footage from police cameras both inside cars and outside, focusing mainly on the phenomenon that is road rage and some of the most gruesome incidents of reckless driving.: This episode does not have idents in between the footage.
7	"The Worst of Police Stop!"	Graham Cole	Unknown	8 April 1996
This episode features the best bits from Police Stop! 1—4, and also includes brand new, never before seen footage.
8	"Police Stop! 5"	Graham Cole	Bill Rudgard	1996
This episode takes a look at drink-driving, road rage, speeding, roadworthiness checks and Christmas hazards on the roads.: This is the first episode to have a post-credits narration sequence containing a montage of footage discussing the episode's overall message. This does not use incidental music. The title sequence uses tyre tracks, as per Police Stop! 3.
9	"Police Stop! 6"	Graham Cole	Bill Rudgard	1996
This is the first to use incidental music in the post-credits narration sequence discussing the episode's content. The title sequence for this episode uses a different font.
10	"Police Stop! 7"	Graham Cole	Bill Rudgard	1997
11	"Police Stop! 8"	TBA	TBD	1998
12	"Police Stop! 9"	TBA	TBD	1999
Graham Cole takes a look at the dangers of large lorries and HGVs on our roads, plus how ice affects drivers.: This is the first episode since Police Stop! 2 to use presenter links, and it also features a montage of footage discussing the show's topics.
13	"Police Stop! 10"	Graham Cole	Bill Rudgard	2000
14	"Police Stop! 11"	TBA	TBD	2001
This episode looks at police in the United States.

== See also ==
- Police Camera Action! – a similar police video programme shown on ITV1 with a similar format
- Road Wars – widely recognised as the replacement of Police Stop!, also produced by Bill Rudgard
- Brit Cops – police reality show on Sky
- Police Interceptors – show about traffic cops broadcast on Channel 5
- Traffic Cops – also called Car Wars and Motorway Cops, a BBC TV series with a similar format
- Sky Cops – series about helicopter police on BBC One
- Street Crime UK – TV show on Bravo documenting police work in the UK
