= Global Wrestling Network =

Defunct professional wrestling streaming service

- Broadcast area: Argentina, Australia, Austria, Belgium, Brazil, Bulgaria, Canada, Chile, Croatia, Cyprus, Czech Republic, Denmark, Estonia, Finland, France, Germany, Greece, Hungary, Ireland, Italy, Japan, Latvia, Lithuania, Luxembourg, Malta, Mexico, Netherlands, New Zealand, Poland, Portugal, Romania, Slovakia, Slovenia, Spain, Sweden, Switzerland, United Kingdom, United States, Uruguay
- Headquarters: Toronto, Ontario, Canada

Programming
- Language: English
- Picture format: HDTV (1080i 16:9)

Ownership
- Owner: Anthem Wrestling Exhibitions, LLC

History
- Launched: October 10, 2017
- Closed: May 1, 2019
- Replaced by: Impact Plus

Links
- Website: globalwrestlingnetwork.com

Global Wrestling Network (GWN) was a digital streaming service and mobile app owned by Impact Wrestling (now Total Nonstop Action Wrestling), a subsidiary of Anthem Sports & Entertainment. It primarily featured content from the Impact video library, along with original programming and content from independent and international promotions. The service ceased operating on May 1, 2019, when it was replaced by Impact Plus (now TNA+).

== History ==
The first service to stream Total Nonstop Action Wrestling (TNA) content on-demand happened in 2009, when the company launched its own 'TNA Video Vault'. The service changed its name to 'TNA On Demand' in 2010 and ran up until around early 2013. The company also launched the 'TNA Wrestling Plus' YouTube channel - where users could rent pay-per-views and documentaries previously released on DVD. In early 2017, Anthem launched the 'Total Access TNA' (later renamed 'Total Access Impact') originally for UK users after Challenge TV's TNA broadcasting contract had expired.

In June 2017, Executive Vice President of Anthem Sports and Entertainment Ed Nordholm told The Tennessean that the company once known as TNA had rebranded. As part of expanding the brand, Nordholm said he had been planning an on demand service that would tap into TNA's video library. The Tennessean noted that the library was valuable as TNA had previously signed many legendary wrestlers and several wrestlers who appeared in TNA later signed with WWE.

At the time of the rebranding, the company had been named Impact Wrestling after its flagship program, and had assumed the name of Global Force Wrestling (GFW). In October 2017, Jeff Jarrett left the company and it reverted to the Impact Wrestling name as Jarrett owned the rights to GFW. The Global Wrestling Network (GWN) name had been influenced by its connection to GFW.

The launch of GWN was hinted on Impact!, until an announcement on the August 31, 2017 episode revealed a planned release in September. Nordholm appeared on Wrestling Observer Radio on September 9 and stated that the goal of the network was to be an alternative brand to the WWE Network. The network temporarily went live on September 12, 2017 while the infrastructure was being tweaked, but was taken down by the next day.

Global Wrestling Network officially launched on October 10, 2017. A 30-day free trial period was offered at launch. The service features free content for subscribers along with a premium content service for $7.99 USD in all available territories. Over 1,000 hours of content from the Impact Wrestling libraries are available to subscribers but the network also includes tape libraries from the Fight Network, Border City Wrestling, Wrestling at the Chase and other sources.

In November 2017, content from several independent promotions such as WrestleCade, Rocky Mountain Pro, DEFY Wrestling and Future Stars of Wrestling were added to GWN.

On August 14, 2018 Jeff Jarrett and his company Global Force Entertainment announced that it had filed a lawsuit against Impact Wrestling's parent company Anthem Sports & Entertainment in the District Court of Tennessee for copyright infringement over the GFW rights, as Jarrett owned all Global Force Wrestling properties since its creation in 2014. Impact would have needed to suspend the operations of GWN had the lawsuit been successful.

Impact announced the launch of its new premium streaming service, Impact Plus, on April 28, 2019, during its Rebellion pay-per-view. Impact Plus subsequently replaced Global Wrestling Network. Three months later, Anthem counter-sued Jarrett and claimed that the looks and trademarks of GFW and GWN were not similar.

== Programming ==
At the time the service was shut down, the following programming was included:

=== TNA/Impact ===
==== Repeat/archival programming ====
- All pay-per-view events (except most recent pay-per-view event)
- Select One Night Only events (All 2013–2015, 2017–present; 7 of 10 2016)
- All TNA weekly pay-per-views (aka the Asylum Years)
- All episodes of TNA British Boot Camp
- Select episodes of Impact! (All 2004-2005, 2017–present (except those which aired within 10 days); select 2006-2007, 2015–2016)
- Select episodes of Impact! Xplosion (All 2017-2018, select 2016)
- Select episodes of TNA Legends
- Select episodes of TNA Unfinished Business
- Select episodes of TNA's Greatest Matches
- Select episodes of TNA Epics
- All episodes of Inside Impact
- All episodes of Twitch Specials
- Impact in 60
- Classic Compilations (TNA's home video releases)
- Hidden Gems

=== Other promotions ===
==== Classic wrestling ====
- All 12 volumes of Wrestling at the Chase
- Pro Wrestling Superstars

==== Independent wrestling ====
Promotion	Abbreviation	Programming	Owner	Date added
Border City Wrestling	BCW	Major events	Scott D'amore	October 10, 2017
Future Stars of Wrestling	FSW	Major events	Scott D'amore	November 2017
Defy Wrestling	DEFY	Major events	Matt Farmer	November 2017
WrestleCade		Major events	Tracy Myers and Brian Hawks	November 2017
Rocky Mountain Pro Wrestling	RMP	Pay-per-view events, Charged	Matt Yaden	November 2017
Prestige Wrestling	Prestige	Major events	William Quintana	2018
America's Most Liked Wrestling	AML	Major events	Tracy Myers and Brian Hawks	2018
Preston City Wrestling	PCW UK	Major events	Steven Fludder	2018
Destiny World Wrestling	Destiny	Major events	Emilio Albi	2018
Capitol Wrestling		Major events	Harry Terjanian	2018
World Series Wrestling	WSW	Major events		2018
International Pro Wrestling	IPW: UK	Major events		2018
United Wrestling Network	UWN	Championship Wrestling from Hollywood, Championship Wrestling from Arizona	David Marquez	2018
Great White North Wrestling	GNW	Major events	Devon Nicholson	2018
Superkick'd		Major events		2018
WrestlePro	—N/a	Major events	Pat Buck	2018

==== Original Specials ====
- Conversations
- My Best 5
- Retrospectives
- Documentaries
  - Bret Hart: Survival of the Hitman
