= Police stop =

A police stop may be:

- a Terry stop, in U.S. law, a brief detention of a person by police
- a traffic stop, the detention of a driver of a vehicle by police
- Police Stop!, a British television program.
