= Susan Rae =

British newsreader

Susan Scott Rae (born 2 June 1956) is a retired Scottish newsreader and continuity announcer on BBC Radio 4, BBC Radio 3 and BBC Radio 4 Extra.

Rae was born and raised in Dundee, Scotland, and read English at Edinburgh University. She left the university before her finals, and began work with D. C. Thomson newspapers in Dundee, before taking up work on BBC Radio Aberdeen. After three years there, she left to work in London in the early 1980s as a continuity announcer and newsreader on BBC Radio 4. The response to her voice on Radio 4 at this time was negative; some listeners believed the BBC's commitment to accurate pronunciation was in decline.

Later in the 1980s she moved to daytime television, co-presenting Open Air, and continued with voiceover work when the show ended. Rae began working on the BBC World Service around 2000, returning to BBC Radio 4 in 2003.

She has done voiceovers for many Discovery Channel shows (including some episodes of Forensic Detectives and The FBI Files), and for Bravo's series Street Crime UK. In 2007, she presented Eastern Skies for Anglia Television.

In March 2022, she was diagnosed with early-onset Alzheimer's disease. On a JustGiving page appealing for funds to help with her care, the family said "After over 30 years on air, the condition has left her unable to work." In June 2022, she was moved to a retirement community where she could live independently.

== Personal life ==
Rae lives in London. She is a humanist celebrant.
