= A Man's Work =

(A) Man's Work may refer to:

- A Man's Work, a 1967 book by Gordon Lish
- A Man's Work (film), a 2007 Finnish film
- Man's Work, a UK television series
