= List of Australian television ratings for 1996 =

The following is a list of Australian television ratings for the year 1996.

== Network shares ==
Market	Network shares
Market	ABC1	Seven	Nine	Ten	SBS
5 cities	14.2%	30.4%	31.9%	20.7%	2.8%
Sydney	15.4%	28.0%	33.3%	20.4%	3.0%
Melbourne	13.3%	31.0%	32.9%	20.4%	2.4%
Brisbane	13.7%	31.3%	31.1%	21.1%	2.8%
Adelaide	13.4%	30.8%	32.0%	20.8%	2.9%
Perth	14.6%	34.2%	26.9%	21.3%	3.0%

* Data Gathered by then Ratings Supplier: A.C Neilsen Australia

== Most Watched Broadcasts in 1996 ==
Rank	Broadcast	Genre	Origin	Network	Audience
1	1996 AFL Grand Final (North Melbourne vs. Sydney)	Sport	(Australia)	7	3,312,000
2	1996 Atlanta Olympics (Opening Ceremony)	Sport	(United States)	7	3,079,000
3	1996 Cricket World Cup Final (Australia vs. Sri Lanka)	Sport	(Australia)	9	2,555,000
4	A Current Affair: Kokoda Track Challenge	News	(Australia)	9	2,496,000
5	Jurassic Park	Film	(United States)	7	2,362,000
6	Rugby League (State Of Origin 1)	Sport	(Australia)	9	2,357,000
7	Mrs. Doubtfire	Film	(United States)	7	2,285,000
8	Rugby League (State Of Origin 2)	Sport	(Australia)	9	2,248,000
9	Cliffhanger	Film	(United States)	10	2,237,000
10	Blue Heelers (1996 Season Average)	Police drama	(Australia)	7	2,232,000
11	60 Minutes: Gun Ownership Debate (High Noon Special)	News	(Australia)	9	2,209,000
12	1996 Australian Grand Prix Race	Sport	(Australia)	9	2,129,000
13	1996 Atlanta Olympics (Sunday Primetime)	Sport	(United States)	7	2,118,000
14	ER (1996 Season Average)	Medical drama	(United States)	9	2,115,000
15	1996 Rugby League Grand Final	Sport	(Australia)	9	2,072,000
16	Sleepless in Seattle	Film	(United States)	10	2,051,000
17	A Few Good Men	Film	(United States)	10	2,045,000
18	Australia's Funniest Home Videos: Grand Final (Winner Announced)	Reality	(Australia)	9	1,994,000
19	Police Camera Action! (1996 Season Average)	Reality	(United Kingdom)	7	1,974,000
20	Four Weddings and a Funeral	Film	(United Kingdom)	9	1,972,000
21	Death Becomes Her	Film	(United States)	10	1,971,000

== Top Rating Regular Programs ==
Rank	Programme	Network	Audience
1	Blue Heelers	7	2,232,000
2	ER	9	2,115,000
3	Police Camera Action!	7	1,974,000
4	Better Homes and Gardens	7	1,945,000
5	The Great Outdoors	7	1,895,000
6	This Is Your Life	9	1,867,000
7	60 Minutes	9	1,851,000
8	Friends	7	1,788,000
9	Australia's Funniest Home Videos	9	1,754,000
10	A Current Affair	9	1,754,000

== See also ==
- Television ratings in Australia
