= List of programs broadcast by Bravo =

List of programs broadcast by Bravo may refer to:

- List of programs broadcast by Bravo (American TV network)
- List of programmes broadcast by Bravo (British TV channel)
- List of programs broadcast by Bravo (Canadian TV channel)
