= Rust Bucket =

Rust Bucket, rust bucket, or rustbucket may refer to:

- Slang for a decrepit car
- "Rust Buckets", 1998 episode of the documentary TV series Police Camera Action!
- Rustbucket, Max Tennyson's recreational vehicle (RV) from the animated series Ben 10
- Rustbucket Stadium, a fictional stadium in the 2009 3D video game Cars Race-O-Rama
- "Rustbucket", 2010 music single (and "The Rustbucket EP") from the Canadian rock band One Bad Son

== See also ==
- "Way Down in the Rust Bucket", 2021-released (1990-recorded) live rock music album by Neil Young
