= List of Virgin 1 Presents.... episodes =

The following is a list of episodes from the Virgin 1 television series, Virgin 1 Presents.....

== Seasons ==
=== Season 1 ===
The first season's episodes begin airing on Saturday 17 November 2007.

The original UK airdates are listed here for each episode.

No.	Title	Original release date	Prod. code
1	"Virgin 1 Presents The Guillemots at The Astoria"	17 November 2007	101
The Guillemots recorded live at The Astoria in London, performing their first hit 'Annie, Let's Not Wait' and 'Trains to Brazil'.
2	"Virgin 1 Presents Robert Plant at the Cornbury Music Festival"	24 November 2007	102
Led Zeppelin frontman Robert Plant performs a special solo act at The Cornbury Music Festival in Oxfordshire.
3	"Virgin 1 Presents The Magic Numbers at The Eden Project"	1 December 2007	103
The Magic Numbers recorded live at The Eden Project in Cornwall, performing songs including 'Love Me, Like You' and 'Forever Lost'.
4	"Virgin 1 Presents The Buzzcocks at The Forum"	8 December 2007	104
5	"Virgin 1 Presents The Pretenders at The Cornbury Music Festival"	15 December 2007	105
6	"Virgin 1 Presents José González at The Eden Project"	22 December 2007	106
7	"Virgin 1 Presents Nerina Pallot at The Cornbury Music Festival"	29 December 2007	107
An exclusive performance by Nerina Pallot at The Cornbury Music Festival including her hit single Everybody's Gone to War.
8	TBA	5 January 2008	108
9	TBA	12 January 2008	109
10	TBA	19 January 2008	110
11	TBA	26 January 2008	111
11	TBA	2 February 2008	111
12	TBA	9 February 2008	112
13	TBA	16 February 2008	113

== Future Episodes ==
Future episodes include musician Robyn Hitchcock.
