= Crime Invasion: Britain's New Underworld =

- Genre: Documentary
- Created by: Vashca
- Presented by: Rageh Omaar
- Country of origin: United Kingdom
- Original language: English
- No. of seasons: 1
- No. of episodes: 10

Production
- Running time: 30 minutes (incl ads)

Original release
- Network: Virgin 1
- Release: 4 October – 29 November 2007

Crime invasion: Britain's New Underworld is a 10 part is a documentary television programme produced in the United Kingdom by Vashca for the television station Virgin 1.

This documentary series investigates the new organised crime cells that now dominate Britain's underworld, such as the Yardies and Turkish mafia. Each of the gangs featured in the series has its roots in other countries and have been able to successfully establish bases in Britain, from where they now operate.

The documentary also focussed on how the police, customs and other agencies are working to combat these growing crime networks and will include testimonies from victims and gang members.

The Executive Producer is Glenn Barden.

== Episodes ==
| No. | Title | Original release date | Prod. code |
|---|---|---|---|
| 1 | "Romanian (cashpoint fraud)" | 4 October 2007 | 101 |
| 2 | "Albanian (Prostitution)" | 11 October 2007 | 102 |
Investigation on Albanian mafia
| 3 | "Vietnam (Cannabis)" | 18 October 2007 | 103 |
| 4 | "Yardies (Drugs)" | 25 October 2007 | 104 |
| 5 | "TBC" | 1 November 2007 | 105 |
| 6 | "Kurdish Mafia (Heroin)" | 8 November 2007 | 106 |
Rageh Omaar investigates Asian criminal groups, the main competitors for the UK's heroin trade, and reveals how they have set up their own money laundering system.
| 7 | TBA | 15 November 2007 | 107 |
| 8 | TBA | 22 November 2007 | 108 |
| 9 | TBA | 29 November 2007 | 109 |
| 10 | TBA | 29 November 2007 | 110 |
