= Caribbean Cops =

- Genre: Documentary
- Created by: October Films
- Narrated by: Shaun Parkes
- Country of origin: United Kingdom
- Original language: English
- No. of seasons: 1
- No. of episodes: 8

Production
- Running time: 60 minutes (incl ads)

Original release
- Network: Virgin 1
- Release: 11 May – 29 June 2008

Caribbean Cops is an 8 part documentary created for Virgin 1.

The series was shot on location in Jamaica, Trinidad and Tobago, and St Lucia, and was designed to capture the drama behind policing these holiday destinations and keeping the islands safe.

Throughout the series, cameras followed each of the islands' local police forces in their battles against international drug smuggling, gun crime and homicide, as well as other crimes directly linked with the tourist trade. The series is narrated by English actor Shaun Parkes. Series Producer: Tricia O'Leary

== See also ==
- Brit Cops
- Road Wars
- Police Interceptors
- Traffic Cops
- COPS
