= Glenn Barden =

British television producer

Glenn Barden was one of the series producers of the National Geographic series One Strange Rock hosted by Will Smith.

He became known in the UK in 2000 for creating the controversial television endurance show Touch the Truck, which was described by the Sunday Times as "the worst tv idea ever".

== Education ==
Barden went to school in Brighton. He studied Management and Chemical Sciences at University of Manchester Institute of Science and Technology and graduated with a BSc 2.1.

== Career ==
Barden started his television career at MTV Europe, first working as a writer at MTV News and then as a producer/director, interviewing over 100 pop stars and musicians. He later became a senior member of the Creative team where he conceived and designed their primetime comedy and gossip show MTV Hot. The show's attitude and style were later used as the basis of Channel 4's Popworld.

In 1999 he was series producer of the BBC2 music series Acetate.

In 2000 he produced and directed Hellraisers, a documentary on notable bad boys Oliver Reed, Keith Moon and Richard Harris. When broadcast on Channel 4 on a Saturday night it attracted over 2 million viewers.

In the same year, he formed the independent production company Vashca. It launched with a series on religious cults for Channel 4 in the UK. Their output also included Bravo series I Predict a Riot and Virgin One's Rageh Omaar's Crime Invasion as well as the documentary The Real Dirk Diggler about the seventies porn star John Holmes. It was at Vashca that he co-created the existential endurance show Touch The Truck and sold the format across the world.

In 2008 Barden left Vashca to return to freelance television work.

In 2010 he was the series producer of Celebrity Masterchef 2010. The show was nominated as Best Factual Programme at the National TV Awards.

In 2011 he was Series Producer of the National Geographic series The'90s: The Last Great Decade.

In 2014 he produced and directed two episodes of The Brain with David Eagleman.

In 2014 his novel My Little Soldiers, a romantic comedy about a man with infertility issues, was published by Piranha Press.

In 2016 he began work on One Strange Rock as Series Producer. He worked on the series for almost 3 years. The series won three Wildscreen Awards It was also nominated for Best Science Documentary at the Grierson Awards 2018 and Emmy nominated for Outstanding Science and Technology Documentary.

In 2019 he executive produced Chitty Flies Again. The documentary followed David Walliams as he built a real flying car. It aired on Channel 4 on New Years Day.

In 2021 he executive produced the HBO true-crime series Rich & Shameless.

In 2022 he released the feature documentary F**K IT UP! which he produced and directed with Dave Hills.
