= SceneOne =

Defunct television channel and website in the United Kingdom

- Website type: Entertainment
- Available in: English
- Owner: Flextech Television
- Creator: Flextech Television
- Website: www.sceneone.co.uk
- Commercial: Yes
- Registration: No
- Launched: February 1999
- Current status: Closed April 2002

SceneOne
- Country: United Kingdom

Ownership
- Owner: Flextech Television

History
- Launched: June 2000
- Closed: March 2001

SceneOne was a general entertainment website and television channel operated by Flextech Television, now Living TV Group.

The site was accessible via the public internet and within the walled garden of the Telewest and Cable and Wireless cable television platforms (now Virgin Television). Listings from the site were also available via Orange's WAP mobile phone walled garden. The website started in February 1999, and following an announcement in March 2002, the site was shut on 4 April due to a lack of revenue. The site's coverage spanned cinema, TV, radio, music, concerts, theatre, comedy, online, books and videos.

The television channel was announced in 1999, launched in June 2000 and closed in March 2001. It was accessible to subscribers of Telewest cable television. There was speculation that the closure was due to low viewing figures and the failure to gain carriage on Sky Digital, although this was denied by the general manager of SceneOne. The channel broadcast for 24 hours per day, and broadcast entertainment news and reviews on similar genres to the web site. Programmes included The Film Scene, The Gig Scene, and Knockin' Out.

The SceneOne brand was also used for an entertainment shopping portal accessible via the Open.... interactive television service on Sky Digital satellite television.

SceneOne was recently a brand for a 5-minute show dedicated to showbiz and latest on DVD/CD releases on Living.
