= Cop Squad =

2011 British documentary reality show

- Genre: Documentary
- Country of origin: United Kingdom
- Original language: English
- No. of series: 1
- No. of episodes: 10

Production
- Running time: 60 minutes (inc. adverts)

Original release
- Network: Sky1
- Release: 6 June – 8 August 2011

Related
- Brit Cops

Cop Squad is a British documentary reality show that was broadcast on Sky1 from 6 June to 8 August 2011 and replaced Brit Cops. (It is considered to be the same show). It follows the Cambridgeshire Police.
