= Jackpot247 =

Interactive gambling website

- It's Time To Play
- Website type: Gambling
- Available in: English
- Owner: Betsson
- Website: www.jackpot247.com
- Commercial: Yes
- Launched: 1 July 2008; 18 years ago (As Challenge Jackpot)
- Current status: Online

Jackpot247
- Genre: Live, Gaming interactive show
- Presented by: Various

Production
- Camera setup: 3SixtyMedia; Multi-camera
- Production company: NetPlayTV

Original release
- Network: ITV, JML Store
- Release: 6 September 2011 – 1 July 2019

Related
- JML Store

Jackpot247 (formerly Challenge Jackpot) is an interactive gambling website owned by Betsson Group. From 2008 until 2019, the site had television segments on channels including ITV and Vox Africa. The "Challenge Jackpot" brand was dropped in September 2011 and was replaced by "Jackpot247" (Jackpot247.com). Challenge Jackpot was also a British interactive gaming channel owned by Living TV Group (later British Sky Broadcasting) and operated by NetPlay TV. Its final programme was in the early hours of 1 July 2019 on ITV.

In March 2017, Betsson Group acquired Jackpot247, having purchased Netplay TV for £26 million.

== Business ==
NetPlay TV plc acquired the business assets of Two Way Gaming Ltd for £2 million in stock. NetPlay TV signed production and gaming agreements with Virgin Media for an initial period until 30 June 2013, and took over production of the Challenge Jackpot brand, including its website and television channel.

On 25 March 2010, NetPlay TV and Virgin Media Television agreed to the termination of the option agreement entered into on 7 April 2009 under which VMTV was granted options over 14.9 million ordinary shares representing 9.9 per cent of the share capital then in issue at a price of 18p per share. Under the revised agreement, NetPlay TV took control of the Challenge Jackpot database and terminated the option agreement in exchange for a fixed cash payment of £1.82 million. The database generated £2.9 million of gross gaming margin from 12 May to 31 December 2009 and was subject to a revenue share agreement. Under the revised terms all revenues arising from this database were retained by NetPlay TV, with VMTV receiving fixed monthly payments that reflected the value of its airtime.

== Restrictions ==
Jackpot247 is not available to those who live in Northern Ireland or the Channel Islands.

== Television channel ==
Challenge Jackpot logo

Challenge Jackpot was launched by Virgin Media Television, in collaboration with Two Way Media, on 1 July 2008 as a 24-hour television channel on Sky and Virgin Media. It was not available in Northern Ireland, the Republic of Ireland, or the Channel Islands due to "regulatory and legal restrictions". Games were overseen by Ofcom and, because Two Way's gaming division was based there, the Alderney Gambling Control Commission.

Publicis was appointed to handle the £3 million launch brief for Challenge Jackpot, creating a TV, print, and online campaign, and came up with the tag line "your favourite place to play". The main programme, Roulette Nation (Live), aired between 10 pm and 3 am daily (previously live between 6 pm and 4 am), with Roulette Nation Express taking over between 3 am and 10 pm. Bingo Stars aired for 30 minutes at around 12:30 am.

Roulette Nation was also available on Freeview via Virgin1, between midnight and 3 am. Bravo 2 broadcast the show between 1 am and 3 am (Roulette Nation Express took over for an hour, ending at 4 am).

On 20 May 2010, ITV launched their new teleshopping strand, The Zone, launching a new NetPlay TV's show, Bingo Stars. Roulette Nation aired in the two-hour block for around 30 minutes. From 2012 until 2019, Jackpot247 was listed as a stand-alone programme on ITV (except ITV Channel Television), airing after midnight until 3am, no longer using The Zone branding.

On 12 February 2010, the Scottish ITV licensee STV replaced STV Casino with Roulette Nation – airing between midnight and 1 am every night, until STV aired the show for the last time on 18 August 2010, when interactive quiz show Brain Box took over the slot.

On Virgin Media's cable television service, an interactive application developed by Two Way Media enabled viewers to play along with live programming on the channel; alternatively, viewers were able to participate on the channel's website.

The channel closed down on 1 January 2011, shortly after the purchase of Virgin Media Television by BSkyB from Virgin Media, and was replaced with Aastha TV on Sky.

== Presenters ==
Years	Presenters	Shows
2010–2011	Simon Atkins	Bingo Stars
2008–2009	Ben Baldwin	Roulette Nation
2008–2009	Jeff Brazier	Roulette Nation
2010	Georgina Burnett	Bingo Stars
2010–2011	Lucia Coward	Bingo Stars
2008–2010	Sarah-Jane Crawford	Roulette Nation
2010–2011	Liam Dolan	Roulette Nation
2008–2010	Anna Fowler	Roulette Nation
2008–2012	Kevin Harris	Bingo Stars; Roulette Nation
2008–2010	Lynsey Hipgrave	Roulette Nation
2010–2011	Lawrie Jordan	Bingo Stars
2010	Caroline Kautsouds	Bingo Stars
2008–2009	Alex Kramer	Roulette Nation
2008–2016	Emma Lee	Roulette Nation
2008–2013	Vicky Letch	Roulette Nation
2008–2013	Mel Peachey	Roulette Nation
2009–2019	Craig Stevens	Jackpot247
2010–2019	Steve Milne	Jackpot247
2012–2017	Jamie Rickers	Jackpot247
2013–2019	Carrie Watson	Jackpot247
2012–2019	Leah Charles King	Jackpot247
2014–2019	James Green	Jackpot247
2014–2019	Gema Enseñat	Jackpot247
2017–2019	Alex Simpson	Jackpot247
2017–2019	Adele Sica	Jackpot247

== TV advertisements ==
In April 2014, Jackpot cited the Welsh village of Pwllgloyw in a TV commercial as one of the worst places in the UK for mobile internet reception. According to Ofcom, Powys had the poorest 3G reception in mainland England and Wales, and the area around Pwllgloyw fell in the worst 6% of the UK for 3G coverage by all network operators. The company claimed that, in places like Pwllgloyw, players were unable to win jackpots 24/7.

== Data breach ==
In January 2020, Jackpot247 sent emails to all of their customers advising them that they had suffered a data breach with the following message:

We regret to inform you that Jackpot247 has suffered a security incident and some of your personal data has been revealed to an unauthorized person. We took various mitigating measures and the unauthorised person is no longer able to access your data. Rest assured that our investigations show that your credit card, payment information, password and copies of any documents sent to Jackpot247 have not been accessed and remain secure. After conducting detailed investigations into the incident, we can confirm that the unauthorised person has been able to access your username and name, email address, telephone number, residential address, date of registration and some internal activity classifications that are not of relevance to the unauthorized person.

It is our duty to report this data breach to you and inform you what data has been compromised.

Users were advised to reset passwords and be wary of phishing emails being received.
