= Virgin 1 Presents.... =

- Genre: Music
- Created by: Music Engine Productions
- Country of origin: United Kingdom
- Original language: English
- No. of seasons: 1
- No. of episodes: 13 (list of episodes)

Production
- Executive producers: Katy Haswell; Mick Southworth
- Producers: Simon Clement-Davies; Martin McCabe
- Running time: 60 minutes

Original release
- Network: Virgin1
- Release: 17 November 2007 – 16 February 2008

Virgin1 Presents.... is an music show consisting of 13 hour-long programmes which contain a mixture of music performance and artist interviews shot at venues across the UK. The show was originally going to be called Live in Concert however, this changed once Virgin1 acquired the rights. Mysteriously, the show disappeared from Virgin1's schedules in February 2008.
