= Touch the Truck =

British game show

- Genre: Game show
- Created by: Glenn Barden; Dave Hills
- Directed by: Sue McMahon
- Presented by: Dale Winton
- Country of origin: United Kingdom
- Original language: English
- No. of series: 1
- No. of episodes: 5

Production
- Executive producer: Sharon Ali
- Production location: Lakeside Shopping Centre
- Production company: Vascha Productions

Original release
- Network: Channel 5
- Release: 11 March – 15 March 2001

Touch the Truck was a British Channel 5 endurance game show which aired in March 2001. Hosted by Dale Winton, it involved a group of 20 contestants holding onto a stationary Toyota Land Cruiser Amazon truck for as long as they could. The last person left touching the truck won it.

The show was filmed at the Lakeside Shopping Centre in West Thurrock, Essex.

Jerry Middleton, 39, from Winchester, was the winner; he managed to stay awake touching the vehicle for 81 hours, 43 minutes, and 31 seconds. He stated that he was going to sell the vehicle to fund a political party. Middleton stood in the southwestern London seat of Kingston and Surbiton in 2001 and came in last place, with 0.1% of votes cast.

== Rules ==
According to the rules of the competition, disqualification would occur when:

- a contestant took a longer break than allotted (ten minutes every two hours, and fifteen minutes every six hours).
- a contestant removed both hands from the truck while not on a break, or
- a contestant fell asleep.

== The format ==
The format was devised by Glenn Barden and Dave Hills and is owned by Vashca. It has been subsequently licensed to the Philippines, Indonesia, Portugal, and Turkey.

== In popular culture ==
The show played a significant part in the second episode of Diane Morgan's 2020 BBC sitcom Mandy.

== See also ==
- Hands on a Hardbody: The Documentary
