= ....Envy =

- Genre: Documentary
- Created by: Twofour Broadcast
- Presented by: Various
- Country of origin: United Kingdom
- Original language: English
- No. of seasons: 1
- No. of episodes: 3 (to date) (list of episodes)

Production
- Running time: 60 minutes

Original release
- Network: Virgin 1
- Release: 1 October – 20 December 2007

....Envy is a series of documentaries created for Virgin 1 designed to highlight growing British obsessions.

== Seasons ==
=== Season 1 ===
The first season's episodes began airing on 1 October 2007.

The original airdates (United Kingdom) are listed here for each episode.

No.	Title	Original release date	Prod. code
1	"The Great British: Penis Envy"	1 October 2007	101
The Great British: Penis Envy explored the results of a specially commissioned national research project entitled, "The Great British Penis Survey", as well as conducting an experiment called "The Enlargement Experiment" that was designed to discover whether or not going to extreme lengths ever works.
2	"Boob Envy"	13 December 2007	102
Presented by Thaila Zucchi, Boob Envy explores whether having a big bosom makes a woman happy or is seen as a pain in the back. The show also covered the male opinion, and speaks to biologists in an attempt to uncover why breasts come in so many shapes and sizes. The show followed a group of woman who believe that their breast size is inadequate and after being given the opportunity to meet with a cosmetic surgeon for an initial breast enhancement consultation whether they will go through with the operation. As well as a chance to see exactly what the surgery entails as the show follows one teenager as she undergoes the procedure.
3	"Money Envy"	20 December 2007	103
Presented by Stephen K Amos, Money Envy explores why Britain has become a nation motivated by bank balances and consumer goods, and looks at the world of the super rich to attempt to uncover whether being rich makes people as happy as people believe it will.
