= Man's Work =

British television program

Man's Work is a television series produced in the United Kingdom which broadcasts on the UK channel Bravo. It features Ashley Hames, who has to trial some of the toughest, hardest & demanding jobs on the planet. *

== Episode list ==
- Episode 1 – Alaskan King Crab Fisherman (Alaska)
- Episode 2 – Logger (Canada)
- Episode 3 – Drugs Cop (Colombia)
- Episode 4 – Fireman (Canada)
- Episode 5 – Crime Scene Cleaner (USA)
- Episode 6 – Opal Mining (Australia)
- Episode 7 – Montego Bay Coastguard (Jamaica)
- Episode 8 – Volunteer Fireman (Australia)
- Episode 9 – Football Manager (England)
- Episode 10 – Stuntman (New Zealand)
- Episode 11 – Gaucho (Brazil)
- Episode 12 – Aussie Rules Ruckman (Australia)
- Episode 13 – Mountain Rescue (Australia)

== See also ==
- Bravo
