= List of Police Camera Action! episodes =

The following is an episode list of the television series Police Camera Action! The programme is presented by Alastair Stewart (1994–2009), Adrian Simpson (2007–2009) and Gethin Jones (2010).

== Overview ==
Blocks of episodes with the same colour scheme indicate the opening titles used in this particular series.

| Series | Episodes | Originally released | |
| Series | Episodes | First released | Last released |
|---|---|---|---|
| Pilots | 3 | 7 September 1994 | 17 April 1995 |
| 1 | 3 | 11 October 1995 | 25 October 1995 |
| 2 | 3 | 15 April 1996 | 29 April 1996 |
| 3 | 5 | 21 October 1996 | 7 January 1997 |
| 4 | 3 | 29 April 1997 | 12 November 1997 |
| 5 | 4 | 30 December 1997 | 20 January 1998 |
| 6 | 5 | 22 October 1998 | 26 November 1998 |
| Specials | 2 | 6 January 1999 | 19 January 1999 |
| 7 | 6 | 10 January 2000 | 28 February 2000 |
| 8 | 6 | 3 July 2000 | 7 August 2000 |
| 9 | 5 | 15 May 2001 | 13 June 2001 |
| Specials | 2 | 7 January 2002 | 14 January 2002 |
| 10 (Note: These episodes were recorded in 2002 but not actually aired until 2006) | 6 | 17 January 2006 | 21 February 2006 |
| 11 | 10 | 20 September 2007 | 12 December 2007 |
| 12 | 22 | 5 January 2008 | 24 January 2008 |
| 13 | 6 | 30 June 2008 | 17 December 2008 |
| 14 | 4 | 29 July 2010 | 19 August 2010 |

== Episode list ==
=== Pilots (1994-1995) ===
| No. overall | No. in series | Title | Original release date |
|---|---|---|---|
| 1 | 1 | "Police, Stop!" "Danger, Drivers Ahead!" | 7 September 1994 |
| 2 | 2 | "Police, Camera, Action!" | 20 December 1994 |
| 3 | 3 | "Police, Camera, Action! '95" "Safety Last" | 17 April 1995 |
Alastair looks at motorists who fail to keep calm while driving on the motorway, endangering their lives and those of other road users. He investigates how improvements to car safety have cut deaths and injuries on national roads by nearly half, despite there still having been as many crashes.

=== Series 1 (1995) ===
| No. overall | No. in series | Title | Original release date |
|---|---|---|---|
| 4 | 1 | "International" | 11 October 1995 |
| 5 | 2 | "Helicops" | 19 October 1995 |
| 6 | 3 | "Tales of the Unexpected" | 25 October 1995 |

=== Series 2 (1996) ===
| No. overall | No. in series | Title | Original release date |
|---|---|---|---|
| 7 | 1 | "Driven to Distraction" | 15 April 1996 |
| 8 | 2 | "The Liver Run" | 22 April 1996 |
Alastair presents a special edition of the programme, which features one single film. A patient's body at the Cromwell Hospital in London is chronically rejecting a recently replaced liver, and a suitable donor organ is located in Hull. Cameras follow the final part of the journey, where the Metropolitan Police use a patrol car to cover twenty-nine miles across central London on a busy Friday afternoon - with only thirty-five minutes to complete the journey.
| 9 | 3 | "International Patrol" | 29 April 1996 |

=== Series 3 (1996-1997) ===
| No. overall | No. in series | Title | Original release date |
|---|---|---|---|
| 10 | 1 | "Unfit to Drive" | 21 October 1996 |
| 11 | 2 | "Euro-Cops" | 28 October 1996 |
| 12 | 3 | "The Man Who Shot OJ - Program 1" | 2 December 1996 |
| 13 | 4 | "The Man Who Shot OJ - Program 2" | 9 December 1996 |
| 14 | 5 | "Road to Nowhere" | 7 January 1997 |

=== Series 4 (1997) ===
| No. overall | No. in series | Title | Original release date |
|---|---|---|---|
| 15 | 1 | "On Your Bike" | 29 April 1997 |
| 16 | 2 | "Out of Control" | 23 September 1997 |
| 17 | 3 | "Don't Look Back in Anger" | 12 November 1997 |

=== Series 5 (1997-1998) ===
| No. overall | No. in series | Title | Original release date |
|---|---|---|---|
| 18 | 1 | "When Did You Last See Your Motor?" | 30 December 1997 |
| 19 | 2 | "The Wild Side" | 6 January 1998 |
| 20 | 3 | "Enough's Enough" | 13 January 1998 |
| 21 | 4 | "A Lorry Load of Trouble" | 20 January 1998 |

=== Series 6 (1998) ===
| No. overall | No. in series | Title | Original release date | Viewers (millions) |
|---|---|---|---|---|
| 22 | 1 | "Coat Hanger Man" | 22 October 1998 | 9.02m |
| 23 | 2 | "Rust Buckets" | 5 November 1998 | 8.30m |
| 24 | 3 | "Captured!" | 12 November 1998 | 9.04m |
| 25 | 4 | "The Unprotected" | 19 November 1998 | 9.41m |
| 26 | 5 | "Speed" | 26 November 1998 | 9.71m |

=== Specials (1999) ===
| No. overall | No. in series | Title | Original release date | Viewers (millions) |
|---|---|---|---|---|
| 27 | 1 | "On the Buses" | 6 January 1999 | 12.00m |
| 28 | 2 | "Learning the Hard Way" | 19 January 1999 | 9.85m |

=== Series 7 (2000) ===
| No. overall | No. in series | Title | Original release date | Viewers (millions) |
|---|---|---|---|---|
| 29 | 1 | "What Drives You Mad?" | 10 January 2000 | 9.00m |
Alastair counts down the top ten most annoying habits of British drivers as voted for by the public. These include tailgating, failing to indicate, slow drivers and speeding.
| 30 | 2 | "In the Driving Seat" | 24 January 2000 | 7.14m |
Alastair joins the Metropolitan police to discover how they are combatting the number of deaths caused by collisions involving police vehicles. Plus, more footage of drivers making dangerous high speed manoeuvres.
| 31 | 3 | "On the Edge" | 7 February 2000 | 8.43m |
| 32 | 4 | "Back to Basics" | 14 February 2000 | 8.08m |
| 33 | 5 | "Staying Safe" | 21 February 2000 | 9.35m |
| 34 | 6 | "Nowhere to Hide" | 28 February 2000 | 8.61m |
Alastair finds out about the latest techniques used by officers to trap drivers evading arrest, and takes part in a simulated pursuit with the Metropolitan Police. Elsewhere, pet-loving teenagers are caught on camera returning to the scene of a crime.

=== Series 8 (2000) ===
| No. overall | No. in series | Title | Original release date | Viewers (millions) |
|---|---|---|---|---|
| 35 | 1 | "Monster Drivers" | 3 July 2000 | 6.91m |
Alastair assesses the true state of London's congested roads by taking to the skies, and thermal-imaging cameras close in on criminals cowering in a wood.
| 36 | 2 | "Brat Pack" | 10 July 2000 | 6.91m |
Alastair investigates bad and dangerous driving by young inexperienced drivers and youngsters trying to escape police capture, as well as the new horse-cam being used in the North East to stop football hooliganism.
| 37 | 3 | "Crash Test Racers" | 17 July 2000 | 6.55m |
| 38 | 4 | "Highway of Tomorrow" | 24 July 2000 | 6.72m |
| 39 | 5 | "Round the Bend" | 31 July 2000 | 5.36m |
| 40 | 6 | "Danger Ahead" | 7 August 2000 | 5.56m |

=== Series 9 (2001) ===
| No. overall | No. in series | Title | Original release date |
|---|---|---|---|
| 41 | 1 | "Rogues Roadshow" | 15 May 2001 |
Alastair investigates criminals who try to escape the police in stolen vehicles with little consideration for other road users. Meanwhile, fourteen-year-old school pupils are given a graphic demonstration of the tragic effects of car theft.
| 42 | 2 | "Too Close for Comfort" | 22 May 2001 |
| 43 | 3 | "A Fair Cop" | 29 May 2001 |
| 44 | 4 | "Smash and Grab" | 6 June 2001 |
Police helicopters track a gang of masked ram-raiders on the run across four counties - pausing only to fill up with petrol. While CCTV cameras capture their high-speed getaway, Alastair gets a bird's-eye view of the drama in an RAF jet.
| 45 | 5 | "Getting Their Man" | 13 June 2001 |
Alistair speaks to both the British and Canadian police forces, who face various dangers when trying to catch fleeing criminals, but often it is the criminals who put themselves in danger. We see what dangers occur and how the offenders are caught.

=== Specials (2002) ===
| No. overall | No. in series | Title | Original release date | Viewers (millions) |
|---|---|---|---|---|
| 46 | 1 | "Ford" | 7 January 2002 | 4.58m |
| 47 | 2 | "Race" | 14 January 2002 | N/A |
Alastair takes part in a professional race as he participates in the Fiesta challenge. We also see a compilation of drivers who create their own races, including those trying to escape the police in vehicles suitable for rallycross.

=== Series 10 (2006) ===
This series was originally filmed in 2002, but was not broadcast at the time following Alastair Stewart's conviction for drink driving. The series was eventually broadcast in 2006, exclusively on ITV4. This series was also the last series to be presented primarily by Stewart.

| No. overall | No. in series | Title | Original release date |
|---|---|---|---|
| 48 | 1 | "Life in the Fast Lane" | 17 January 2006 |
| 49 | 2 | "Motorway Madness" | 24 January 2006 |
| 50 | 3 | "Diversion Ahead!" | 31 January 2006 |
| 51 | 4 | "Under the Influence" | 7 February 2006 |
| 52 | 5 | "City Limits" | 14 February 2006 |
As the population of the United Kingdom increases, so does the road congestion during the early morning commute and the evening rush hour. Alastair investigates what happens during congestion, and what some drivers will do to avoid tailbacks.
| 53 | 6 | "Nicked!" | 21 February 2006 |
The government pledged to cut car crime by a third over the duration of five years. Alastair investigates the different types of car crime, and what is being done to stop them.

=== Series 11 (2007) ===
This series was broadcast on Monday nights at 9:00pm, before moving to a 10:00pm slot on Thursdays midway through the series.

| No. overall | No. in series | Title | Original release date | Viewers (millions) |
|---|---|---|---|---|
| 54 | 1 | "Ultimate Pursuits: The Best of Police, Camera, Action!" | 20 September 2007 | N/A |
In a special presentation celebrating five years since the last episode of Police, Camera, Action! was filmed, Alastair gives a run down of his favourite clips from across various series.
| 55 | 2 | "Speed Dating" | 24 September 2007 | 3.45m |
| 56 | 3 | "Without Due Care" | 1 October 2007 | 4.01m |
Alastair and Adrian explore the dangers that drive motorists to distraction. Featuring footage taken from a police helicopter that gives a new meaning to the term 'fast food' - a man eating a pan of spaghetti while steering a 40-ton truck with his knees.
| 57 | 4 | "Monster Trucks" | 8 October 2007 | 3.55m |
Alastair turns the spotlight on crashes involving large vans and lorries, which often occur because the drivers cannot see other motorists who stray too close to their vehicles. Meanwhile, Adrian gives a graphic demonstration of what happens to cyclists who do not heed safety warnings.
| 58 | 5 | "The Crushers" | 15 October 2007 | N/A |
Adrian discovers how police use their powers to seize and crush cars when the drivers do not have insurance or a licence. He is with one of the 50,000 cars seized this way each year, and has a tense wait to see if the owner will come to reclaim it - if not, the car will be condemned to the crusher.
| 59 | 6 | "Stop Thief!" | 18 October 2007 | N/A |
Alastair shares statistics revealing that more than 500,000 cars are stolen in Britain each year and offers tips to help viewers keep their vehicles secure. Plus, footage demonstrating how police officers are tackling car crime.
| 60 | 7 | "Street Illegal" | 25 October 2007 | N/A |
Alastair and Adrian present a rundown of illegal car modifications, including fat exhausts, tinted windows and non-standard number plates. Plus, a look at car rallies that have been known to cause mayhem across the UK.
| 61 | 8 | "Techno Cops" | 1 November 2007 | N/A |
Alastair witnesses a knife-wielding criminal being subdued by a camera stun gun as he takes a look at the technology used by the police, and Adrian experiences a device for roadside fingerprinting. Plus, Baitcars in action and clips of high-speed action from forces around the UK.
| 62 | 9 | "Jacked & Cloned" | 8 November 2007 | N/A |
Adrian details an audacious scam in which cars are taken by violent means from their owners, and the vehicles' identities cloned so the public can be duped into buying them. Plus, more action-packed footage from across the UK and videos from America showing the lengths to which criminals will go to avoid capture.
| 63 | 10 | "Speed Freaks" | 12 December 2007 | N/A |
Adrian joins the Greater Manchester Police to investigate initiatives to encourage drivers to keep their speed down. This episode was originally due for broadcast on 15 November 2007 but was delayed for reasons unknown.

=== Series 12 (2008) ===
This series was first broadcast on ITV4, with episodes later being repeated in the graveyard slot on ITV1. This was also the last series to be presented by Stewart. It was also the first and only series to be broadcast daily.

| No. overall | No. in series | Title | Original release date |
|---|---|---|---|
| 64 | 1 | "Rural Roads" | 5 January 2008 |
Alastair presents clips of dangerous driving captured on police surveillance cameras, highlighting the alarming death statistics on rural roads.
| 65 | 2 | "Search & Rescue" | 6 January 2008 |
A special programme which contains dramatic pictures of daring rescues that reveal the lesser known role of the police, featuring camera shots which follow South Yorkshire police both in the air and underwater.
| 66 | 3 | "Safety Last" | 7 January 2008 |
| 67 | 4 | "The Off-Roaders" | 8 January 2008 |
Alastair and Adrian investigate the most controversial cars in recent years - four-wheel drives, a regularly encountered fashion accessory in town, yet more dangerous to the environment and pedestrians than ordinary vehicles. Dramatic footage reveals why they are so popular with thieves and ram-raiders.
| 68 | 5 | "Caught on Camera" | 9 January 2008 |
Alastair and Adrian present footage of speeding motorists caught on camera and dramatic pursuits of drivers over the legal alcohol limit. Plus, an American road-user who is in need of anger management.
| 69 | 6 | "Inexperienced Drivers" | 10 January 2008 |
Alastair and Adrian question whether the standard British driving test is up to the job, along with police videos which reveal why some young drivers are such a danger on the roads. The duo also investigate what the police are doing to stop the carnage.
| 70 | 7 | "Unroadworthy Vehicles" | 11 January 2008 |
Alastair and Adrian present footage of negligent drivers, whose vehicles have bald tyres and unreliable brakes. Adrian also presents tips on how to stop a car from becoming a death trap.
| 71 | 8 | "Less Lethal Weapons" | 12 January 2008 |
Alastair and Adrian look at how the UK's police forces are tackling dangerous criminals - without using guns. Adrian joins the Sussex and Cambridgeshire forces in action and there are shocking results when the Chief Constable of Greater Manchester Police gets a taste of a taser. Plus, more reckless driving captured by police forces across the country.
| 72 | 9 | "Helicops" | 14 January 2008 |
Adrian discovers why police helicopters are such effective weapons in the fight against crime, and looks at footage captured by the vehicles being used to track down criminals.
| 73 | 10 | "Urban Jungle" | 14 January 2008 |
Adrian follows the Sussex police to investigate why urban roads are the biggest killers of pedestrians and children, and reveals their efforts to make a change. Includes police car video footage capturing chaos in cities and criminals on the run.
| 74 | 11 | "Going to Extremes" | 15 January 2008 |
| 75 | 12 | "Motorway Madness" | 15 January 2008 |
| 76 | 13 | "Eco Unfriendly" | 16 January 2008 |
Alastair and Adrian put the spotlight on drivers who endanger the environment and other road users with their disregard for safe practices.
| 77 | 14 | "ASBO Drivers" | 16 January 2008 |
Alastair looks at the phenomenon of Asbo drivers - whose behaviour terrorises other drivers and makes crashes much more likely. Plus, Adrian travels with Greater Manchester Police as they go on the trail of people who make roads more dangerous with their selfish and aggressive driving.
| 78 | 15 | "Two Wheel Terror" | 17 January 2008 |
Adrian receives a course in motorbike safety with Devon and Cornwall Police, explaining what riders can do to avoid becoming another statistic and protect themselves, along with questioning how safe bikes actually are.
| 79 | 16 | "Death Wish Drivers" | 17 January 2008 |
Alastair and Adrian follow the journey of a death wish driver and discover the tragic consequences of being reckless on the road, and take a look at the most lethal and careless drivers on the road, responsible for the deaths of hundreds of victims each year. Including dramatic police footage of kamikaze crooks at the wheel.
| 80 | 17 | "Bad Influences" | 18 January 2008 |
Alastair examines how around a half of all fatal collisions involve drivers who have been influenced by drink or drugs behind the wheel, while Adrian reports on how to avoid becoming one of the statistics, with dramatic police footage showing how lethal the drivers who can't kick their habits can be.
| 81 | 18 | "Crime Cars" | 18 January 2008 |
Adrian investigates the tricks used by criminals who regard the road as a tool of their trade. Plus, Officers from Greater Manchester Police investigate two vehicles that are not what they appear to be.
| 82 | 19 | "Moto Mania" | 21 January 2008 |
Adrian finds out how Greater Manchester Police are tackling the problem of mini motorbikes being used in criminal activity. Including police footage capturing the deadly criminals at work.
| 83 | 20 | "Animal Enforcers" | 22 January 2008 |
Adrian joins Gloucestershire Police's dog unit to see how man's best friend is trained to be the criminal's worst enemy. Including police footage that illustrates how dogs can reach places that humans can't.
| 84 | 21 | "Police in Pursuit" | 23 January 2008 |
| 85 | 22 | "Under Surveillance" | 24 January 2008 |
Alastair and Adrian chart the evolution of the use of security cameras in the UK and look at footage captured on CCTV cameras.

=== Series 13 (2008) ===
This series was presented solely by Simpson, and was the first series to be of an hour-long format. Most of the clips in this series had previously been broadcast in other episodes. This was the last series to be presented by Simpson.

| No. overall | No. in series | Title | Original release date |
|---|---|---|---|
| 86 | 1 | "Britain's Most Dangerous Roads" | 30 June 2008 |
| 87 | 2 | "Ultimate Bad Drivers" | 7 July 2008 |
| 88 | 3 | "Ultimate Car Crimes" | 14 July 2008 |
| 89 | 4 | "Ultimate Boy Racers" | 21 July 2008 |
| 90 | 5 | "Car-Tech Maniacs" | 28 July 2008 |
| 91 | 6 | "Drink & Drive: Christmas Special" | 17 December 2008 |

=== Series 14 (2010) ===
This was the first and only series to be presented by Gethin Jones. This series also adopted a more documentary-like feel, rather than containing mostly clips like the previous series did. It continued the hour-long format previously adopted in Series 13.

| No. overall | No. in series | Title | Original release date |
|---|---|---|---|
| 92 | 1 | "Young, Legal but Lethal" | 29 July 2010 |
| 93 | 2 | "Fast and Furious" | 5 August 2010 |
| 94 | 3 | "Distracted, Dangerous and Dumb" | 12 August 2010 |
| 95 | 4 | "When Lorries Become Lethal" | 19 August 2010 |
