= TNA Epics =

Wrestling television series

- Genre: Sports entertainment Professional wrestling
- Created by: Dixie Carter
- Presented by: Mick Foley
- Countries of origin: United Kingdom, United States
- No. of episodes: 20 (7 unaired)

Production
- Running time: 1 hour per episode (44 minutes plus commercials).

Original release
- Network: Bravo (2009); Spike (2010); Extreme Sports Channel (2010)
- Release: 15 May 2009 – 15 April 2010

Related
- TNA Impact! (2004-present); TNA Xplosion (2002–2021, 2024-present); Before the Impact (2021-2023); TNA Gut Check (2004–present); TNA Global Impact! (2006); TNA Today (2007); TNA British Boot Camp (2013–2014); TNA+

TNA Epics is a professional wrestling television program for Total Nonstop Action Wrestling that aired on Spike in the United States and Bravo in the United Kingdom. The show was hosted by Mick Foley and showed matches and events from the history much like WWE Vintage. In December 2009, Dixie Carter announced in an interview that Epics would be debuting on Spike in January 2010. The second season began on Thursday, 14 January 2010.

The series was later released in full on Impact Wrestling's Impact Plus streaming service.

== History ==
=== Beginning on Bravo (2009) ===
TNA Epics originally aired on Bravo in the United Kingdom before being broadcast in the United States. The show was announced on 8 May 2009, as a chance for UK TNA fans to see classic TNA matches and events for the first time since TNA signed with Bravo and Classic TNA shows ceased being shown on The Wrestling Channel. On 26 June 2009, the air time of TNA Epics on Bravo was moved from Fridays at 10 pm GMT to Saturdays at 11 pm, meaning that TNA Epics would now be shown following the UK showing of TNA Impact! Epics disappeared from television in the UK when the 11 July 2009, episode which was set to feature "The Best of Jeff Hardy in TNA" was taken off the television listings before being set to air. The status of the show remained unknown until it was announced to be cancelled on 2 August 2009, less than three months from its inception. However, the developed episodes are still available on television in Germany, Austria and Switzerland. However, Bravo showed replays of the episodes of TNA Epics at a new time of Saturdays at 8 pm, before the TNA Impact! broadcasts, and on 26 September 2009, the previously unaired episode "X-Division Insanity, Part 1" was shown.

=== TNA Epics on Spike (2010) ===
On 3 December 2009, TNAWrestling.com posted a video interview with TNA president Dixie Carter. She announced that a "new show", TNA Epics would debut on Spike. It was later revealed that the show would begin on 14 January 2010, and air on one Thursday per month. On 19 February 2010, it was announced that the 18 March edition of TNA Epics, featuring the X-Division was dropped from Spike's schedule. But, the show was later announced to be moved to Monday Nights following iMPACT! with the dropped episode being aired on Spike following TNA iMPACT! on 15 March. However, the episode was once again moved to the following night, Tuesday 16 March. Since April 2010, the current status of the show is unknown and no further episodes have been announced.

=== TNA Epics on Extreme Sports Channel (2010) ===
On Friday 19 November 2010, TNA Epics began re-airing on Extreme Sports Channel in the UK. At this time Extreme was already home to TNA's Monthly Pay-Per Views and weekly syndicated show Xplosion. Epics aired back to back double episodes every Friday night on Extreme Sports Channel, following TNA Xplosion at 10 pm and 11 pm. The show's run on Extreme ended on 31 December 2010, when TNA's contract with Extreme Sports ended and all TNA programming moved to Challenge.

=== Streaming services (2016) ===
On 19 September 2016, Impact Wrestling began airing and releasing previously aired and unaired episodes of TNA Epics on the Impact Plus and Pluto TV streaming services. The series has produced 20 episodes with 7 episodes that were previously unaired until the 2016 release on the promotions streaming service.

== Episodes ==
=== Season 1 (2009) ===
No.	Title	Original release date
1	"Best of Six Sides of Steel"	15 May 2009
A look back on some of the best Six Sides of Steel Matches in TNA history, featuring: AMW vs. Triple X from Turning Point 2004; LAX vs. A.J. Styles and Christopher Daniels from Bound for Glory 2006; Barbed Wire Six Sides of Steel: Christian Cage vs. Rhino from 16 November 2007, edition of TNA Impact!
2	"Best of the X-Division Championship Matches vol. 1"	22 May 2009
A look back on some of the best early X Division championship matches in TNA history, featuring: First-ever X Division Championship Match: Four Way Double Elimination match from 26 June 2002; Samoa Joe vs. Christopher Daniels vs. A.J. Styles from Unbreakable 2005
3	"Best of Slammiversary"	29 May 2009
A look back on some of the best matches from TNA's summer anniversary events, featuring: A.J. Styles and Christopher Daniels vs. America's Most Wanted from Slammiversary 2006; Team 3D vs. Rick Steiner and Road Warrior Animal from Slammiversary 2007; A.J. Styles vs. Kurt Angle from Slammiversary 2008
4	"King of the Mountain Ladder Matches"	5 June 2009
A look back at the first three King of the Mountain Ladder matches, a match that has made TNA what it is today. Featuring: Jeff Jarrett vs. Raven vs. A.J. Styles vs. Ron Killings vs. Chris Harris from 2 June 2004; Raven vs. A.J. Styles vs. Sean Waltman vs. Monty Brown vs. Abyss from Slammiversary 2005; Jeff Jarrett vs. Christian Cage vs. Sting vs. Ron Killings vs. Abyss from Slammiversary 2006
5	"Knockouts"	12 June 2009
A look back at some of the best women's wrestling matches in TNA history, featuring: Knockout Championship Gauntlet from Bound for Glory 2007; Awesome Kong vs. Gail Kim from the 10 January 2008, edition of Impact!; First-ever Queen of the Cage match from Lockdown 2008
6	"The Hogan Controversy"	19 June 2009
A look back to a controversial incident in October 2003 when Jeff Jarrett travelled to Japan to attack the legendary Hulk Hogan! Includes rare footage from the brawl with Hogan as well as the fallout that enrupted involving Jimmy Hart, Rick Steiner and Sting.
7	"The Best of the World Heavyweight Title Matches, Part 1"	27 June 2009
A look back to some of the early World title matches in TNA, featuring: Raven vs. Jeff Jarrett from 30 April 2003; A.J. Styles vs. Jeff Jarrett from Hard Justice 2005; Raven vs. Rhino from Unbreakable 2005
8	"The Hardcore Wars, Part 1"	4 July 2009
A look back on historic barbaric matches in TNA, featuring: Rare footage of the bloody Raven scalping at the hands of Shane Douglas and James Mitchell from 17 September 2003; Full Metal Mayhem: Abyss vs. Jeff Hardy from Against All Odds 2005; Team 3D and Rhino vs. Jeff Jarrett and America's Most Wanted from Genesis 2005; Barbed Wire Massacre: Abyss vs. Sabu from Turning Point 2005
9	"The Best of Jeff Hardy in TNA"	Unaired
A look back on some of the best matches in TNA from Jeff Hardy, one of wrestling's most popular superstars, featuring: Jeff Hardy vs. Monty Brown from the 15 October 2004, edition Impact!; Jeff Hardy vs. Scott Hall from Final Resolution 2005; Falls Count Anywhere: Jeff Hardy vs. Abyss from Destination X 2005
10	"X-Division Insanity, Part 1"	26 September 2009
A look back at some of the most daredevil, crazy, high-flying X Division matches in TNA history, featuring: Jerry Lynn and Amazing Red vs. Triple X (Christopher Daniels and Elix Skipper) vs. Chris Sabin and Jonny Storm vs. Jason Cross and Shark Boy from 9 April 2003; A 22 man X Division Gauntlet for the X Division Championship from August 2004; A 20 man X Division Battle Royal from Victory Road 2004

=== Season 2 (2010) ===
No.	Title	Original release date
1	"Kurt Angle"	14 January 2010
A look back on some of Kurt Angle's greatest matches in the six-sided ring. Matches include: Kurt Angle vs Samoa Joe from Genesis 2006; Last Man Standing Match: Kurt Angle vs AJ Styles from Hard Justice 2008; Kurt Angle vs Jeff Jarrett from Genesis 2009
2	"Sting at Bound for Glory"	11 February 2010
A look back on Sting's victories on TNA's biggest pay-per-view of the year. Matches include: Sting vs Jeff Jarrett from Bound for Glory 2006; Sting vs Kurt Angle from Bound for Glory 2007; Sting vs Samoa Joe from Bound for Glory 2008
3	"X-Division Insanity, Part 2"	16 March 2010
A look back at some of the most daredevil, crazy, high-flying X Division matches in TNA history. Matches include: Samoa Joe vs Christopher Daniels vs A.J. Styles from Unbreakable 2005; Steel Asylum Match from Sacrifice 2008; Ultimate X Match from Bound for Glory 2009
4	"The Best of Mick Foley"	15 April 2010
A look back on Mick Foley's greatest moments in TNA. Matches include: Lethal Lockdown: Sting's Warriors vs Jarrett's Army from Lockdown 2006; Mick Foley vs Kevin Nash from Hard Justice 2009; Mick Foley vs Sting from Lockdown 2009

== See also ==
- Total Nonstop Action Wrestling (TV Series)
