= Sin Cities =

British television series

Sin Cities is a British sexually oriented travel television series. It originally broadcast on Bravo from 2000 to 2007. It has also been broadcast on Showcase in Canada. Series 1 and 2 were produced by Visual Voodoo (a division of ITN) while Series 3 and 4 were produced by Class Films.

The first season was hosted by Grub Smith in 2000. A second series, dubbed Sin Cities 2 was hosted by Ashley Hames in 2002. The third series, known as Sin Cities 3 was also hosted by Hames.. The fourth series, again hosted by Hames, was first aired in 2007.

The premise of the series sees the host traveling to cities around the world and exploring sexual entertainment options, occasionally even participating. The tone of the series is irreverent and humorous, with a tendency to focus on some of the more bizarre options available, such as wearing nappies and being captured for sexual pleasure.

Smith and Hames co-hosted a spin-off series entitled Sin Cities Unleashed which consisted of edited highlights from the first two series of Sin Cities. After completing the 4th series, Hames said on his official MySpace site that the programme was finished.

== Series Guide ==
- Series 1: 17x30' Production year : 2000
- Series 2: 15x30' Production year : 2002 - First shown 1 July 2002
- Series 3: 15x30' Production year : 2003 - First shown 3 November 2003
- Series 4: 10x30' Production year : 2006 - First shown 22 March 2007
- Sin Cities Unleashed: 17x 30' Production year : 2004 - First shown 5 April 2004

== See also ==
- SexTV
- Sex Tourism
- Sexual Secrets
- The Sex Files
