= Travel Sick =

- Starring: Grub Smith
- Country of origin: United Kingdom
- No. of series: 2
- No. of episodes: 30

Original release
- Network: Bravo
- Release: 2001 – 2002

Travel Sick is a British hybrid comedy-travel television series that originally aired on Bravo from 2001 to 2002. It placed UK writer Grub Smith in a different region of the world in each episode. In each destination, he was asked to complete five undesirable challenges posed by the show's producers. If he failed a challenge, he was forced to perform something unpleasant called a "forfeit". The more he failed, the worse the "forfeit" at the end of the show became.

In 2002, the series was picked up by Comedy Central in the United States for at least 15 episodes.

== Series 1 (2001) ==
#	Location	Notable challenge
1	Iceland	Play golf on glacier
2	Turkey	Deliver a letter to an underwater home
3	Morocco	Have sex with a watermelon
4	South Korea	Play golf in a war zone
5	The Philippines	Drink a dwarf under the table
6	Cambodia	Beat Miss Cambodia in a shoot out
7	The Wild West	Get probed by aliens
8	New Zealand	Castrate a bull and eat its testicles
9	Australia	Eat a road kill sandwich at 14,000 ft
10	Tennessee, US	Beat a miniature person at miniature golf
11	New Orleans, US	Become a born-again virgin
12	Los Angeles, US	Join an LA gang
13	Jamaica	Make a Rasta make you lunch
14	Spain	Fight a bullfighter
15	Germany	Read a peace poem in a riot

== Series 2 (2002) ==
#	Location	Notable Challenge
1	Thailand	Carry a "fridge over the River Kwai"
2	Hong Kong	Kick a kung-fu master in the balls
3	Brazil	Capture poisonous spiders
4	South Africa	Feed a great white shark
5	Papua New Guinea	Become a buffet for bats
6	Czech Republic	Play frisbee with a lion
7	Peru	Get intoxicated with ayahuasca
8	India	Wash an elephant's penis
9	Italy	Win a gladiator fight
10	Las Vegas, US	French kiss a bride
11	The Netherlands	Ride a windmill while high on marijuana
12	Romania	Drink blood
13	Chicago, US	Beat a chicken at noughts and crosses
14	Mexico	Trick someone into buying a fake chihuahua
15	Japan	Eat a cannibal
