= Brit Cops =

British television series

- Title card
- Narrated by: Richard Bacon (Series 1‍–‍3); Simon Allix (Series 4); Daniel Abineri (Series 5)
- Country of origin: United Kingdom
- Original language: English
- No. of series: 5
- No. of episodes: 52

Production
- Running time: 50–60 minutes (inc. adverts)
- Production company: Steadfast Television

Original release
- Network: Bravo
- Release: 18 August 2008 – 30 December 2010

Related
- Cop Squad; Coppers

Brit Cops is a British reality television series following police officers in the UK. It was originally broadcast on Bravo. Until the closing of Bravo in 2011, older episodes were then shown on Channel One (formerly Virgin1) until its closure also in 2011, then Sky1. After the fifth series, the show was replaced by Cop Squad. Each series focuses on different UK police forces.

Richard Bacon narrates Series 1–3, Simon Allix narrates Series 4, Daniel Abineri narrates Series 5 and Robert Glenister narrates Series 6.

The show has had the following series:

== Brit Cops: Frontline Crime ==
Series 1: 12 episodes – First shown 18 August 2008. It followed the Q-Cars of the London Metropolitan Police Service, the high-speed reactive units cleaning up the capital. In the South West, the Tactical Aid Group are the tough guys of Devon and Cornwall Police (which were later followed by Raw Cut TV's series 7 of Road Wars). Traffic and Armed Response units are also followed in South-West Wales from Dyfed-Powys Police.

== Brit Cops: Zero Tolerance ==
Series 2: 10 episodes – First shown 25 March 2009. It followed Q-Cars, the response team and the burglary squad in Hammersmith & Fulham, London.

== Brit Cops: Rapid Response ==
Series 3: 10 episodes – First shown 6 January 2010. It followed Wiltshire Police and Dyfed-Powys Police local response officers, alongside Operational Support Groups carrying out raids. Some episodes also featured clips from Traffic Officers policing the roads.

== Brit Cops: Law and Disorder ==
Series 4: 10 episodes – First shown 4 August 2010. It follows the City of London Police as they tackle the rising crime rate within London's "Square Mile". This is the first set that has the new format. For unknown reasons, this series was narrated by Simon Allix rather than Richard Bacon.

== Brit Cops: War on Crime ==
Series 5: 10 episodes – First shown 28 October 2010. It follows the Lincolnshire Police as they tackle drug related and violent crime. This series was narrated by Daniel Abineri.

== See also ==
- Police Interceptors – a series broadcast on Channel 5 with a similar format
- Traffic Cops – a similar series following Road Policing Units in the UK, broadcast on Channel 5, previously aired on BBC One and repeats broadcast on Really and Dave
- Sky Cops – a series first broadcast on BBC featuring the Metropolitan Police Air Support Unit
- Road Wars – a series with a similar format broadcast on Sky1, Sky2 and Pick TV
- Street Wars – a programme broadcast on Sky1 which is more about police officers "on the beat"
- Most Evil Killers – a programme broadcast on Pick TV
