= Sky Replay =

British television channel (2002-2025)

- Final logo, used from 2020 to 2025
- Broadcast area: United Kingdom and Ireland

Programming
- Picture format: 16:9 576i SDTV

Ownership
- Owner: Sky Group
- Sister channels: List of Sky UK channels

History
- Launched: 1 September 1996 (original); 9 December 2002 (relaunch)
- Closed: 31 August 1997 (original) 30 October 2025 (relaunch)
- Replaced by: National Geographic (original)
- Former names: Sky 2 (1996–1997, 2011–2017); Sky One Mix (2002–2004); Sky Mix (2004–2005); Sky Two (2005–2008, 2017–2020); Sky2 (2008–2011)

Availability

Streaming media
- Sky Go: Watch live (UK and Ireland only)
- Virgin TV Go: Watch live (UK only)
- Virgin TV Anywhere (Ireland): Watch live (Ireland only)

Sky Replay was a British pay television channel operated by Sky that began broadcasting in December 2002 as Sky One Mix. The channel was previously known as Sky Two from 2005 to 2020. The brand name and format had earlier been used for a similar service which broadcast on analogue platforms for a year from 1996.

On 27 August 2020, the channel's name changed to Sky Replay and served as a sister channel to Sky Max and Sky Witness; broadcasting repeats of programmes aired on those channels and also broadcasting repeats of dramas that Sky no longer holds first-run rights or rights that are soon to expire. Sky Replay closed at 6 am on 30 October 2025.

== History ==
Sky 2 logo used from 1996 to 1997

The Sky 2 brand was originally launched on 1 September 1996, and served as a sister channel to Sky 1 in the evening (timesharing with Fox Kids). The channel was introduced to offer an expanded range of general entertainment programming, with Sky 2 airing a mixture of programmes already carried on Sky 1 along with programmes exclusive to the channel. Sky 2 however was not as successful as Sky had hoped, and would close nearly a year later without any notice on 31 August 1997. The channel was then replaced by the National Geographic.

=== Rebrand as Sky One Mix (2002–2005) ===
Sky One Mix logo used from 2002 to 2004

On 7 October 2002, Sky announced that they would launch their first digital channel in over a decade; Sky One Mix, functioning as Sky One's sister channel and catch-up service. The channel's launch was announced for 9 December on 13 November 2002 and launched on Sky Digital that day.

The channel, initially broadcasting from noon to midnight, offered up the best of Sky One's programmes, as well as a dedicated children's block called "Animix", which broadcast from 3:30pm every weekday. The channel used a logo and presentation design similar to that used by Sky One at the time, but with a yellow and black theme as opposed to the orange and white used by Sky One at the time.

Initially exclusive to Sky Digital, the channel was added to NTL at the end of July 2003 as part of a two-year contract extension between BSkyB and NTL.

Sky Mix logo used from 2004 to 2005

On 21 September 2004, to coincide with the launch of Sky One's new look, Sky One Mix was rebranded as simply Sky Mix. The channel would keep Sky One's previous branding as before, and kept the same idents without the mention of the word "One".

=== Sky Two (2005–2020) ===
Sky Two logo used from 2005 to 2008

On 18 July 2005, rumours circulated that Sky was planning to extend the Sky One brand by reviving the Sky 2 brand by replacing Sky Mix, and launching a Sky Three as well. The channel rebranded effectively to Sky Two in November of that year, and began using Kaktus Films' animated idents in line with those introduced on Sky One the prior year.

On Thursday 1 March 2007, Sky Two, alongside other non-premium Sky networks, were removed from Virgin Media following a contract dispute between Virgin Media and BSkyB caused by the expiry of their carriage agreement and their inability to reach a new deal. When Sky Two was removed, Virgin Media renamed the slot on the EPG as "Old Sky Two Try Living", before it was removed completely.

In February 2008, Sky Two began utilising the same short-lived range of idents that its sister channels used, except using a "Green" range of graphics.

=== Sky2 (2008-2011) ===
Sky2 logo used from 2008 to 2011

On 31 August 2008, the channel adopted a revised branding of Sky2, when Sky's entertainment channels relaunched with numeric names and shared branding elements, utilising blue solids (Sky1), green liquids (Sky2) and pink particles (Sky3).

On 13 November 2008, following the agreement of a new deal between BSkyB and Virgin Media, Sky2 along with Sky's other non-premium channels returned to Virgin Media's television service.

From 10 May to 9 August 2010, Sky conducted an experimental revision of service, under which Sky2 ceased to run its own full-time programme schedule, and instead predominantly operated a one-hour timeshift of programming on Sky1. Sky2 would, however, retain standalone branding. A Sky spokesperson said: "We are experimenting with different channel schedules to bring maximum value to our customers." Some programmes were excluded from the timeshift device and replaced by alternate content on Sky2 during this period. Shows which weren't shown on the time-delay included the premiere of Sky1's Terry Pratchett's Going Postal, the station's adaptation of the author's Discworld novel. Also not seen on a timeshift basis was the final episode of Lost; which was aired at 5 am, as a simultaneous broadcast with the United States. The last episodes of 24 (which Sky showed as a two-part finale ) also weren't shown an hour later on Sky2. The non-timeshifted programming would often be found an alternative slot on Sky2 (Terry Pratchett's Going Postal would be shown later in the week). This period as a 'time shuffle' channel would draw comparisons between Sky2 and Channel Four's 4seven. The timeshift trial concluded on 9 August 2010, with Sky2 reverting to its previous scheduling pattern.

=== Sky 2 (2011-2017) ===
On 1 February 2011, Sky refreshed the presentation on many of its channels. Sky2's new idents would follow along the same themes as Sky One's, but the action is in close-up, featuring a small metal '2' icon (in contrast to Sky1's giant '1' symbol). Sky1 would later switch to programme-themed idents, whilst Sky2 largely continued to use the 2011 sequences.

Sky 2 logo used from 2011 to 2015

Since 2011, Sky2 has been progressively moved down the programme guide on the Sky satellite platform to make room for other services.

In February 2011, to make way for the relaunched Sky Living, Sky2 moved to channel 129, previously home to Syfy UK.

On 21 February 2012, Sky2 moved up to 121; previously owned by Sky Living +1.

In 2015, with the re-combination of Sky Arts into a single channel, and its move up the grid, Sky2 moved back to 129.

Sky 2 logo used from 2016 to 2017

In April 2016, when Sky1 got new animated identity sequences, Sky2 received a revised version of its 2011 films, with a larger Sky2 logo caption appearing at the end of the sequence, and the backing music changed to that previously used by the Sky1 version of the films.

Sky Two logo used from 2017 to 2020

In Summer 2017, the relaunch of Sky Sports into genre-based channels saw the move of Sky Sports Mix into the entertainment guide, resulting in the relocation of other services including Sky2.

On 9 October 2017, as part of the re-branding and presentation on Sky's entertainment channels, the Sky Two branding was reintroduced nine years after the switch to numerals.

Sky Two dropped its previous filmed idents in favour of using an animated sting featuring the new channel logo.

On 1 May 2018, Sky Two moved up to channel 123 as part of another reshuffling by Sky; replacing ITV Encore, which closed on the same day. On 22 October 2018, the channel moved down to 151, swapping places with E! Europe.

On 1 October 2019, the channel moved down to 170 following the closure of Real Lives and launch of Sky Crime. The following month, the channel was moved again to 168 following the closure of YourTV on 19 November 2019.

=== Sky Replay (2020–2025) ===
On 27 August 2020, Sky Two was rebranded as Sky Replay and moved to Sky channel 145 as a result. The slot's previous occupant, Sky Sports Mix, moved to channel 416.

On 8 November 2022, Sky Replay swapped channel numbers with sister channel Challenge.

The channel closed at 6 am on 30 October 2025, with its final programme being 6ixth Sense with Colin Fry.

== Programming ==
Sky Replay was in many ways a catch-up service for Sky's main entertainment channels, Sky Witness and Sky Max, broadcasting their popular shows. Doing so, Sky Two was described as a time shuffle channel, so called to distinguish it from timeshift channels, which rebroadcast their principal channel, delayed by one hour.

Following the closure of the original Sky Real Lives in 2010, some of its factual and reality programming was relocated to Sky Two. Following the closure of Bravo in 2011, Sky Two adopted some of its programming, particularly in the science-fiction, drama and documentary fields.

With the retooling of Sky Living into the crime and procedural focused Sky Witness, some former Sky Living programming (such as Four Weddings, My Kitchen Rules and Most Haunted) had transferred into the Sky Replay daytime schedule. Sky Replay also broadcast repeats of drama series that Sky no longer holds first run rights or rights that are soon to expire.

After Autumn 2024, Sky Replay no longer operated as a 7-day catch-up service for Sky Witness and Sky Max.

== International ==
A version of Sky Replay for Germany launched on Sky Deutschland and Sky Ticket on 4 October 2021, replacing the previous local box-set channel Sky Serien & Shows. The German feed of Sky Replay closed on 16 March 2026.

On 1 July 2025 Sky Adventure, which has the same branding as Sky Replay but different programming, launched on Sky Italia.
