= Living TV Group =

British television broadcaster, 1990–2011

- Formerly: United Artists Entertainment (Programming) Limited (1988–1996); Flextech Television Limited (1996–2007); Virgin Media Television Limited (2007–2010)
- Type: Broadcast television
- Founded: 9 September 1988
- Defunct: 31 January 2011; 23 April 2014 (company)
- Fate: Acquired and folded by BSkyB
- Headquarters: United Kingdom
- Area served: National; also available in Ireland, selected other countries
- Total assets: 2.5%
- Owner: Telewest (2000–2007); Virgin Media (2007–2010); British Sky Broadcasting (2010–2011)

Living TV Group was a British television consortium originally called Flextech from 1988 before becoming a subsidiary of Virgin Media and renamed Virgin Media Television. It was bought by BSkyB in 2010 and renamed Living TV Group, after which it was integrated into Sky and closed down. Challenge is the only remaining TV channel of the group that is still broadcasting.

Living TV Group and its predecessors had several owned channels (such as Bravo, Challenge, Living, Trouble and Virgin1), available in the United Kingdom on terrestrial, satellite and cable television platforms and in Ireland on satellite and cable television. Living TV Group's advertising was handled by former sister company Interactive Digital Sales (IDS) until 1 January 2011, when Sky Media took over.

== History ==
=== Flextech (1990–2000) ===
Flextech began life as an oil services group, previously floated as an energy investment company back in 1983. After Roger Luard became chief executive in 1986, the company shifted focus into the media industry. Its first media acquisition was in 1990 with a 20% stake in programme producer/distributor HIT Communications; by October of that year, they had acquired a stake in The Children's Channel, when it bought a 25% holding in Starstream Ltd. (TCC's parent company) from BT. By 1992, Flextech was a media-only group, having built up stakes in local cable operators by way of selling off its non-core assets.

During the summer of 1993, Flextech entered into an agreement with International Family Entertainment (IFE), to launch a UK version of IFE's flagship property, The Family Channel (Flextech holding a 39% stake in the venture). IFE had recently purchased much of the assets of the then-recently defunct TVS Entertainment, including most of TVS' library of shows (which would form large parts of the Family Channel's schedule) and The Maidstone Studios, which became the main operational base for The Family Channel; this was a boon to Flextech, as the facility handled the channel's uplink, playout and management operations. In the autumn, talks were held with the US-based cable/media company Tele-Communications Inc. Under the original terms of the proposed deal, Flextech would have acquired TCI's European programming business (United Artists European Holdings, having been inherited by TCI via the purchase of United Artists Theaters' cable television business) in exchange for shares in TCI. By January 1994, the deal was complete, which allowed TCI to acquire 60.4% of Flextech, while Flextech acquired 100% of Bravo, 25% of UK Gold, 31% of UK Living, and 25% of The Children's Channel, increasing Flextech's control over that network.

The relationship between TCI and Flextech continued to grow; in February 1994, Flextech shareholders approved a deal in which Flextech absorbed the European programming interests of United Artists European Holdings. In return, UAEH's US parent, TCI, acquired 60% of the enlarged Flextech. Within days of the deal, Flextech brought a 20% stake in HTV for £27 million. Within a year, the stake was transferred to Scottish Television as part of its deal to acquire a 20% stake in STV. As part of the deal, Flextech agreed to license the rights to over 125 hours of the drama and documentary output from STV's library, as well as a production output agreement to commission television programmes from STV with a minimum total value of 6 million pounds over three years.

In 1995, the company raised £92 million after two new American companies invested in the company, US West (9%) and Hallmark (10%); the additional funds allowed Flextech to buy the remaining shares in The Children's Channel, gaining full control of the network.

Talks were held with BSkyB in the spring of 1996 over a potential merger of the two companies' pay-TV channels, with the aimed of a wholesale consolidation of the subscription market, which would have saved costs and created a dominant supplier of programmes in the UK subscription market and Europe. The deal ultimately came to nothing, but two years later, both companies agreed to allow Flextech's television channels to be broadcast on Sky's new digital platform. In June 1996, Flextech announced that United Artists Entertainment (Programming) Limited would adopt its brand, becoming Flextech Television Ltd. in July. The company cited that the rebranding would avoid confusion between the two names and capitalise on their brand.

Elsewhere that year, it started discussions about increasing its stake in UK Gold to gain full control. At that point, Flextech held 27% with Cox (38%), BBC (20%) and Pearson (15%). By the autumn, Flextech had acquired Cox and Pearson's stakes, giving Flextech an 80% stake in UK Gold.

Also during 1996, talks began between Flextech and the BBC about a partnership to launch a new range of entertainment channels featuring programmes from the BBC's programme library. The deal was signed in March 1997 when the BBC and Flextech unveiled their new venture, which included BBC Showcase, an entertainment channel; BBC Horizon, documentaries; BBC Style, lifestyle; BBC Learning, for schools, and BBC Arena, for the arts, plus three other channels including BBC Sport, BBC Catch-Up, for repeats of popular programmes within days of their original transmission, and a TV version of BBC Radio 1. Initially, it was assumed that the new channels would be BBC‑branded, but Flextech wanted the channels to carry advertisements. The BBC argued that BBC-branded services in the UK should not carry advertising and thought that this would undermine the rationale of the license fee in the UK. A compromise was reached when the BBC launched BBC Showcase and BBC Learning (later renamed BBC Choice and BBC Knowledge shortly before launch) on its own, with the remainder of the deal passing to BBC Worldwide.

Eventually, the concept of the BBC/Flextech channels led the launch of UKTV in November 1997, with BBC Horizon becoming UK Horizons, BBC Style becoming UK Style and BBC Arena becoming UK Arena. The concept of a television version of BBC Radio 1 was reused for the UK Play channel, which launched in October 1998; the dedicated BBC Sport channel never materialised. UK Gold was relaunched as part of the new branding, whilst UK Living remained a separate network, due to the similarities of some of its programming with that of UK Style; prior to UKTV's launch, it was rebranded as Living to avoid confusion with the other UKTV channels. That year also saw The Family Channel relaunched in its current form as the game show-focused Challenge TV.

Flextech agreed to acquire Minotaur International for around $6.5 million in 1999; Minotaur International was responsible for international sales of most programmes commissioned by Flextech. In 2007, Target Entertainment Group acquired Minotaur International and formed strategic alliances with Virgin Media Television to act as their preferred distribution partner.

In 1998, chief executive Roger Luard died, and Adam Singer became chief executive. In early December 1999, talks were convened about a merger between Telewest and Flextech, By 17 December 1999, the merger was agreed upon which created a £10.5bn media giant; Telewest shareholders owned 80% of the new group and Flextech shareholders owned 20%. The two companies fully merged on 19 April 2000.

=== Telewest/NTL/Virgin (2000–09) ===
Flextech continued to expand under Telewest ownership, with UKTV continuing to expand its network of channels with the BBC, plus a new venture which saw a shopping channel come into operation in Autumn 2000. In 2003, Flextech restructured its marketing department with creative solutions put together by central in-house marketers who worked agencies including Banc and Karmarama. The new marketing strategy was also used as a forerunner for the company's newest channel, Ftn, which launched in January 2003 on the Freeview platform. This was followed by Living TV receiving a new on-screen look and an additional channel – Living 2, which specialised in reality and entertainment television. During the spring of 2004, United Business Media and RTL, which both held shares in Five, held talks with Flextech about merging the advertising sales teams of Five and Flextech's channels together, but this deal ultimately did not proceed.

In 2005, Telewest, in preparation for its long-awaited merger with NTL, put Flextech up for sale as the companies agreed "a content provider" had no place within the merged operation. A lot of interest was generated by the sale; potential suitors included ITV, Time Warner and Disney. However, it became clear the BBC had the right to veto any change in ownership of Flextech's stake in the UKTV joint venture, which led to further speculation that Flextech's assets may end up being split. NTL also complicated matters by stating it would be reluctant to see any of Flextech's channels in the hands of terrestrial broadcasters such as ITV or Five; the underlying fear was that a terrestrial broadcaster could use Flextech to bolster the digital terrestrial platform and its appeal to viewers. Commercial terrestrial players had found that the popularity of Freeview worked to their advantage, as viewers have fewer channels to choose from than on pay-TV platforms.

By September, nearly all the bidders had pulled out except for BSkyB, but they later pulled out of the deal over a number of fears, including the Competition Commission investigating the sale. Media analysis at the time did not believe the sale was genuine, although five other bidders including RTL and ITV did state an interest. Simon Duffy, NTL's chief executive, stated "Flextech remains a key focus". Shortly afterwards, Flextech appointed Jonathan Webb to replace Lisa Opie as managing director; Jonathan Webb was responsible for moving Challenge away from its staple of game shows and axing Bravo's "laddism" strategy.

In November 2006, NTL:Telewest began rebranding itself as Virgin Media. The group acquired Virgin Mobile in July, but went further by licensing the "Virgin" name, as they believed "Virgin Media would shake up the market by bringing the Virgin traditions of value-for-money, brilliant customer service and innovation to the world of entertainment and communications". As part of the rebrand, Flextech was also renamed as Richard Branson was keen to move into branded content, and insisted that the Flextech business was retained as a condition of NTL buying Virgin Mobile and licensing the name. On 8 February 2007, Flextech was renamed Virgin Media Television as part of a larger re‑branding exercise covering the whole of NTL:Telewest, Virgin Mobile and Virgin.net.

== Sale to BSkyB ==
On 7 April 2009, Virgin Media formally began the sale of its content operation, issuing a sales memorandum for its Virgin Media Television unit and its ad sales division, IDS. It excluded its 50% stake in UKTV from the sale. Virgin Media sold its stake in UKTV, by then a portfolio of 10 pay-TV channels including Gold, Dave, Home, Watch, Yesterday and Good Food, in August 2011 to US-owned broadcaster Scripps Networks for £339 million (about $504 million). Scripps was negotiating a deal to give BBC Worldwide the option of increasing its stake to a maximum of 60%, by using a combination of cash and an unspecified "package of digital rights" for UKTV. "The new agreement we are developing will bring benefits to UKTV's audiences in the way they can consume content and will help to sustain UKTV's track record of growth," said BBC Worldwide chief executive John Smith.

On 4 June 2010, British Sky Broadcasting and Virgin Media announced that they had reached an agreement for the acquisition by Sky of Virgin Media Television. The companies had, in parallel, agreed to enter into a number of agreements providing for the carriage of certain Sky standard and high-definition (HD) channels. Sky acquired VMtv for a total consideration of up to £160 million in cash, with £105 million paid on completion and the remainder paid following the regulatory process. The acquisition expanded Sky's portfolio of basic pay TV channels and eliminated the carriage fees it previously paid for distributing VMtv channels on its TV services. New carriage agreements secured wholesale distribution of Sky's basic channel line-up, including Sky1 and Sky Arts, and the VMtv channels, on Virgin Media's cable TV service. For an incremental wholesale fee, Virgin Media, for the first time, had the option of carrying any of Sky's basic HD channels, Sky Sports HD 1 and Sky Sports HD 2, and all Sky Movies HD channels. Virgin Media made available through its on-demand TV service a range of content from Sky's basic and premium channels, including the VMtv channels. Virgin Media also gained access to red button interactive sports coverage and the opportunity to deliver selected standard definition programming over the internet. Sky would assume responsibility for selling advertising for the newly acquired VMtv channels from January 2011. Completion of the agreements was conditional on obtaining merger control clearance in the Republic of Ireland.

Virgin1 was also a part of the deal, but was rebranded as Channel One on 3 September 2010, as the Virgin name was not licensed to Sky. Virgin Media's stake in UKTV was not included in the deal.

On 29 June 2010, the Competition Authority in Ireland cleared the proposed transaction. The parties proceeded after the Minister for Enterprise, Trade and Innovation did not direct the Authority to carry out a full investigation within 10 days of the date of the Authority's decision.

On 13 July 2010, British Sky Broadcasting and Virgin Media announced that Sky had completed the acquisition of Virgin Media Television (VMtv) following regulatory approval in the Republic of Ireland. VMtv was then renamed the Living TV Group. In completing the acquisition, Sky paid Virgin Media an initial £105 million. Up to an additional £55 million would be paid on UK regulatory clearance.

On 20 July 2010, the Office of Fair Trading announced that they would review BSkyB's acquisition of the Virgin Media Television business to judge whether it posed any competition concerns in the UK. The OFT planned to investigate the deal to see whether it could constitute a qualifying merger under the Enterprise Act 2002. The watchdog invited interested parties from the industry to comment on the sale, including its potential impact on the pay-TV market. On 14 September 2010, the OFT decided not to refer BSkyB's takeover of Virgin Media's TV channels to the Competition Commission.

Following the sale, BSkyB chose to integrate the Living TV Group into its own operations. This resulted in the closure of Bravo, Bravo 2 and Challenge Jackpot on 1 January 2011 and Channel One on 1 February 2011. On 1 February 2011, Living, Livingit and Living Loves were rebranded as Sky Living, Sky Livingit and Sky Living Loves, while Challenge was added to Freeview, with the channels receiving a 25% boost to their programming budget. Fifty-two of the Living TV Group's 110 employees were made redundant as part of the process, including managing director Johnny Webb, Claudia Rosencrantz (director of television) and Daniela Neumann (director of programmes for Channel One, Bravo and Challenge). The integration process was completed at the end of January 2011. Living TV Group as a whole was dissolved as a company on 23 April 2014.

== Living TV Group channels ==
Living TV Group directly operated a number of linear television channels. Most of the channels were formed in the Flextech years. Additionally, Living TV Group operated a high-definition channel and a number of time-shifted channels. All channels were available on satellite and cable television services. Channel One, was also available on Freeview.

As Flextech, Living TV Group used to be interested in different markets from its current demographics, which focus on an older age group. But, in an attempt to streamline the business that was at the time suffering from falling ratings across these channels, they were closed, and after the sale of Living TV Group to Sky, more channels were disposed of.

=== Bravo ===
Bravo was launched in 1985 as one of the earliest cable-only channels. The channel also had a one-hour timeshift named Bravo +1. Initially Bravo aired black and white B-movies from the 1950s and 1960s and vintage TV series such as Knight Rider and MacGyver, and original productions. In 1996, a policy change saw the channel showing science fiction and horror and later became known for showing crime documentaries by day and adult programming at night. Over the later years, Bravo decreased the adult content shown and increased sports – most notably Serie A Italian football – and imported shows such as Alias. Bravo also aired World Championship Wrestling's flagship show Nitro during WCW's final year in business (2000–2001). Its target audience was men in their late 20s to early 40s. The channel closed on 1 January 2011.

=== Bravo 2 ===
Bravo 2 launched on 2 March 2006 as Player, a sister channel to Bravo that was a spin-off of the "Player" late-night block that aired on Challenge. On 28 September 2006, Player relaunched as Bravo 2 to strengthen its on its parent channel. Much of its content consisted of gambling and sports programmes. As Player, Bravo 2 added exclusive coverage of the FIA GT Championship to its portfolio of sports events. The channel also carried a limited number of Serie A matches. The channel closed on 1 January 2011.

=== Challenge ===
Challenge launched as The Family Channel on 1 September 1993 as a joint venture with International Family Entertainment; airing much of the company's programming archive, including those from Television South. Flextech acquired full ownership of the network in 1996 and relaunched it as Challenge TV on 3 February 1997. The channel relies heavily on game shows taken from a variety of sources, although most are repeats of programmes acquired from the terrestrial channels' archives.

The channel continues to broadcast and remains the only Flextech-owned network to continue operating as is.

=== Challenge Jackpot ===
Challenge Jackpot launched on 1 July 2008 as a 24-hour interactive gaming channel, run in collaboration with Two Way Media. It was available on Virgin Media cable and Sky, but was also available on Freeview via Virgin 1 and Bravo 2 simulcasts overnight. On cable, an interactive application developed by Two Way Media that enables viewers to play along with live programming on the channel; alternatively, viewers may participate on the channel's website. Challenge Jackpot was not available in Northern Ireland due to "regulatory and legal restrictions". Games were overseen by Ofcom and, because Two Way's gaming division was based there, the Alderney Gambling Control Commission. The channel closed on 1 January 2011.

=== European Business News ===
European Business News was a pan-European business news channel, which was operated in partnership with Dow Jones, of which they held a 70% stake, while Flextech held 30%. It broadcast between 06:00 and 12:00 on satellite, timesharing with Bravo, and 24 hours a day on cable. In December 1997, amidst financial losses, Dow Jones announced that the channel would merge with CNBC Europe; itself also suffering from major economic losses. The channel officially merged into CNBC Europe's operations in February 1998, upon which the channel became known officially as "CNBC Europe – A Service of NBC and Dow Jones". Flextech soon sold its interests in the channel to focus exclusively on entertainment.

=== Ftn ===
Ftn (or Flextech Television Network) was the only wholly owned channel; it was closed down by the new VMT. The channel rebranded as Virgin1 on 1 October 2007.

=== Living ===
Living was launched with Sky Multichannels in September 1993 as UK Living, formerly being affiliated with UK Gold before becoming Living TV, LIVINGtv and simply LIVING. It was the main channel from Living TV Group and usually had the highest ratings, recently better than that of Sky One, which strengthened its bid to become "the sixth channel". It originally launched on 1 September 1993 as UK Living, and changed its name to Living in 1997, to disassociate itself from the UKTV network that launched that year.

On 1 February 2011, Living was rebranded as Sky Living. In 2013, in a bid to appeal more universally and to more males, the pink colour scheme was dropped and replaced with a new silver scheme and new types of programming came to the channel whilst simultaneously not losing its female audience. Shows include the likes of the CSI, Close to Home and Boston Legal, the channel was broadening its audience reach to other key demographics such as men aged 18–45.

On 6 August 2018, Sky Living was rebranded as Sky Witness, leaving Challenge as the only active channel that was part of the Living TV Group and bringing an end to the Living brand after nearly 25 years.

=== Livingit ===
LIVINGit and LIVINGit +1 was the sister channel of Living which was launched on 13 December 2004 as LIVINGtv2. The channel mainly showed highlights of programming from the main channel, along with extended coverage of its reality programmes, such as I'm Famous and Frightened Extra! and Most Haunted Live!. However, the channel gained the American reality TV show, The Amazing Race. The channel also showed more lifestyle and health-related programming such as, Baby ER, Birth Stories, Downsize Me and Wedding SOS. There was also a programming slot called Baby Zone, in which programmes related to pregnancy and birth were shown. The channel was rebranded as LIVING2 in 2007, and LIVINGit in 2009.

On 1 February 2011, Livingit was rebranded as Sky Livingit. On 9 June 2015, Sky Livingit was rebranded as Real Lives. The channel closed on 1 October 2019.

=== Living Loves ===
On 5 July 2010, Living Loves replaced Living +2 on Sky and Virgin Media. Running a daily schedule from 15:00 to 02:00, the channel gave viewers the opportunity to experience their favourite Living shows again or catch up on ones that they have missed. On 1 February 2011, Living Loves was rebranded as Sky Living Loves. On 5 September 2011, the channel began broadcasting for 24 hours a day. The channel closed on 21 February 2012.

=== SceneOne ===
SceneOne was a general entertainment website and television channel that was closed down under Flextech management after disappointing reach and a lack of revenue. The website was set up in February 1999, and following an announcement in March 2002, was shut on 4 April 2002. The site's coverage spanned cinema, TV, radio, music, concerts, theatre, comedy, online, books and videos. The television channel was announced in 1999 and launched in June 2000, but was closed in March 2001.

=== Screenshop ===
Screenshop was launched by Flextech in October 1997 as a filler service on their networks. It broadcast teleshopping broadcasts featuring products from around the world. It was later expanded to an online service in 1998 and as a digital channel in 2000. In March 2001, Flextech announced the sale of Screenshop to Sit-Up TV, the owners of Bid-Up.TV, for £10 million in exchange for a 38% stake in Sit Up that was valued at a £14.8m cash injection. After the sale closed, Screenshop's operations were merged into Bid-Up.TV.

=== Setanta Sports News ===
Setanta Sports News was a joint venture channel from Virgin Media Television and Setanta Sports. Following many delays, the channel launched on 29 November 2007. The channel was seen as Virgin Media's replacement of Sky Sports News which had been removed from their platform on 1 March 2007 as their contract with BSkyB had ended. The channel ceased broadcasting on 23 June 2009, the same day that Setanta Sports was placed into administration.

=== The Children's Channel ===
The Children's Channel launched in 1984 and joined the Astra satellite line-up in 1989, with Flextech acquiring a stake in the channel in 1990. TCC closed down silently on 3 April 1998 for unknown reasons, although ratings had fallen dramatically following the launch of rival children's channels. Its slot on the various platforms was taken by TV Travel Shop, although Cable & Wireless continued to briefly run the channel's Nordic feed for several months. Despite the channel's closure, the website continued to be available as late as 2005, however most of the features that were originally available when the channel was still broadcast were removed.

=== Trouble ===
Trouble launched on 3 February 1997 and fully replaced The Children's Channel from 4 April 1998. Trouble had a key demographic of young adults and teenagers, aged between 15 and 24. The channel showed a lot of American and Australian imports, with only a small margin of programmes being British, although a website was launched called Trouble Homegrown that showcased British videos.

The channel closed on 1 April 2009.

=== Virgin1 / Channel One ===
Channel One, a general entertainment channel from Living TV Group, launched on 1 October 2007 as Virgin1 and replaced Ftn on all platforms. Channel One +1 is also available on Virgin and Sky. Some media sources have claimed that the channel was intended to be Virgin Media's attempt to create a rival to Sky1 with the advantage of having a wider reach of viewers. The channel closed on 1 February 2011.

=== Virgin Central ===
Virgin Central was a TV channel launched on the Virgin Media platform on 20 February 2007. It was based on the video on demand system. The service was launched on the Virgin Media platform on 20 February 2007. Viewers pressed the red button on their remote controls and were presented with a list of television series, episodes of which they could have watched at any time they like during the week. The programmes were all free to watch and did not have any adverts in them. The viewer could also have used their remote control to pause, fast forward, rewind and stop the programme at any time.

The Virgin Central channel was removed on 11 March 2010, fully moving over to the On‑Demand section of the Virgin Media menu. A duplicate channel – Virgin Central 2, replaced Sky One on 1 March 2007 following the contract dispute between Virgin Media and BSkyB, before being removed on 11 December 2007 to make way for a Music On‑Demand channel.

== NetPlay TV ==
On 7 April 2009, it was announced that Virgin Media Television had agreed to buy options to acquire 9.9 per cent of NetPlay TV Plc's shares at a strike price of 18 pence per share.

NetPlay acquired the business assets of Two Way Gaming Ltd, the provider of the Challenge Jackpot gaming services, for £2 million in stock.

NetPlay TV signed production and gaming agreements with Virgin Media Television for an initial period until 30 June 2013, and took over production of Challenge Jackpot, including its website and television channel.

On 25 March 2010, NetPlay TV and Virgin Media Television agreed to the termination of the option agreement entered into on 7 April 2009 under which VMTV was granted options over 14.9m ordinary shares being 9.9 per cent of the share capital then in issue at a price of 18p per share (the "Option Agreement"). Under the revised agreement, NetPlay TV will take control of the current Challenge Jackpot database and terminate the Option Agreement in exchange for a fixed cash payment of £1.82m. The current database generated £2.9m of gross gaming margin from 12 May 2009 to 31 December 2009 and was subject to a revenue share agreement. Under the revised terms, all revenues arising from this database will be retained by NetPlay TV, with VMTV receiving fixed monthly payments that reflect the value of its airtime.
