= Booze Britain =

- Genre: Fly on the wall
- Presented by: Mark Womack
- Composers: Nev Hawkins; Adir Tov
- Country of origin: United Kingdom
- Original language: English

Production
- Executive producers: Ralph Jones; Fred Hepburn; Dave Clarke; Rebecca Johnson
- Producer: Graciela Watson
- Running time: 30 minutes
- Production company: Granada

Original release
- Network: Bravo
- Release: 2004

Booze Britain is a Fly on the wall documentary television series produced by Granada that aired on British Satellite television channel Bravo in half-hour episodes which document the binge drinking culture of various towns and cities in the United Kingdom. The series follows a group of friends as they indulge in an evening drinking heavily in various establishments usually in their own town or city, police officers fining and arresting people for various alcohol-related incidents and also paramedics who are called out to handle the consequences of drunkenness. The narration by Mark Womack provides alcohol-related statistics and comments on medical issues raised by the scenes depicted.

Its second series, subtitled Binge Nation, visits numerous places in the country.

== See also ==
- Bar Rescue
- Lad culture
- Broken Britain
