= Challenge (TV channel) =

British television channel

- Logo used since 2016
- Country: United Kingdom; Ireland

Programming
- Language: English
- Picture format: 16:9 576i
- Timeshift service: Challenge +1 (2004–2020)

Ownership
- Owner: Living TV Group (1993–2010); Sky Group (Comcast) (2010–present)
- Sister channels: List of Sky UK channels

History
- Launched: 1 September 1993; 33 years ago 1 February 2011; 15 years ago (Freeview)
- Replaced: Channel One (Freeview)
- Former names: The Family Channel (1993–1997); Challenge TV (1997–2002); Challenge? (2002–2003)

Links
- Website: www.sky.com/watch/channel/challenge

Availability

Terrestrial
- Freeview: Channel 48
- Saorview: Channel 8

Streaming media
- Sky Go: Watch live (UK and Ireland only)
- Samsung TV Plus: Samsung TV Plus

Challenge is a British free-to-air television channel dedicated to game shows from the UK, including acquired classic and contemporary shows. It is owned by Sky UK.

Challenge is currently available on terrestrial television and FAST platforms, such as Samsung TV Plus, along with sister channel Sky Mix. An Irish feed has been available since November 2013 on cable and satellite. It later launched on DTT (Saorview) on 1 February 2023; joining sister channel Sky News on the service.

== History ==
=== As The Family Channel ===
Family Channel UK ident (1995)

The Family Channel was a domestic version of the American cable network of the same name (now known as Freeform), then-owned by U.S. firm International Family Entertainment; which was the spin-off of the Christian Broadcasting Network that operated the channel. Prior to its launch, IFE sold a 39% stake in the channel to the UK-based Flextech (later to be known as Virgin Media Television, and the Living TV Group) in June 1993. The Family Channel was then launched on 1 September 1993.

In April 1996, IFE sold its remaining 61% share to Flextech, giving them full ownership of the venture and production studio in Maidstone.

=== Relaunch as Challenge TV ===
Flextech planned to relaunch The Family Channel as "The Challenge Channel" during the autumn of 1996, with daytime targeted towards housewives, and evening and weekend programming focused on game shows. However, Flextech decided to delay the relaunch so it would not compete with the October 1996 launch of Granada Sky Broadcasting's suite of channels; which included the potential competitor Granada Good Life. Instead, The Family Channel began transitioning to the new brand by introducing a weekend game show strand known as Family Challenge Weekend. On 3 February 1997, The Family Channel rebranded as Challenge TV, devoting the majority of its lineup to game shows.

On 28 March 2002, Flextech announced that they would rebrand Challenge TV as Challenge? on 20 May. In addition, Sky Digital (now known as Sky UK) customers could play some shows from home to earn a spot on the Challenge? leaderboard, with the highest scorers earning prizes. Flextech also announced that these interactive services would come to digital cable later in 2002. A year later, on 30 June 2003, the question mark was dropped from the channel's name, subsequently rebranding it as simply Challenge.

On 13 December 2004, a one-hour timeshift of Challenge, known as Challenge +1, launched on Sky Digital.

In May 2005, with the success of its recently added gambling-related programmes, Challenge launched a dedicated strand titled Player. The block would air from 10:00 pm every night, and feature live poker, as well as scripted series and films.

On 2 March 2006, Player was spun-off to its own channel, which became a sister channel to Bravo. On 28 September, Player was rebranded as Bravo 2.

On 3 June 2008, Challenge, alongside the rest of the Virgin Media Television channels, transitioned its default aspect ratio to 16:9 widescreen. On 1 July, a new sister channel called Challenge Jackpot was launched as a joint-venture between parent company Virgin Media Television and Two Way Media.

=== Under Sky UK ===
On 7 April 2009, Virgin Media formally began the sale of its content operation. On 13 July 2010, Sky UK and Virgin Media announced that the former had completed its acquisition of Virgin Media Television following regulatory approval in the Republic of Ireland.

In March 2010, NetPlay TV, who acquired Two-Way Media in April 2009, terminated their agreement with to run Challenge Jackpot; the venture would be fully sold to NetPlay.

On 15 September, Sky announced the closure of Bravo, Bravo 2 and Channel One. On Tuesday 1 February 2011, Challenge replaced Channel One's Freeview space on the Freeview multiplex; expanding the viewership of the channel by making it free-to-air around the United Kingdom.

On 25 January 2011, it was announced that professional wrestling programming from Total Nonstop Action Wrestling (TNA) would start broadcasting on Challenge from 3 February 2011. In addition to airing Impact and Xplosion, Challenge aired reality series TNA British Boot Camp, and delayed broadcasts of TNA pay-per-view events. On 30 January 2014, for the first time, Impact was broadcast live in the United Kingdom on Challenge before it aired in the United States.

On Monday 3 December 2012, Challenge launched on the free-to-air satellite platform Freesat.

On 7 October 2013, the channel went through a revamp, which included a new logo, and a set of animated characters, named the "Challengers", as idents to represent each type of show; such as Les Play for classics, Ellie for lighter physical shows or Cecil the Geek for science shows.

By 2017, Challenge would drop all wrestling programming.

On 1 June 2020, Challenge +1 was closed on all platforms.

On 12 November 2020, Challenge broadcast football for the first time, when it showed the UEFA Euro 2020 playoff final match between Northern Ireland and Slovakia.

== Programming ==
Programming seen on Challenge as of November 2026 includes The Chase, Bullseye, Family Fortunes, Catchphrase, and Bruce's Price Is Right & Play Your Cards Right. The channel has also produced its own original programmes, including revivals of Bullseye and Blockbusters.

Challenge has previously broadcast general interest programming (including the BBC blooper show Auntie's Bloomers from 2009 to 2011), and was the former UK rights holder for U.S. professional wrestling company TNA.
