= Sky Mix =

British television channel

- Logo used since 2026

- Alternate Logo for UI/EPG, digital and small format spaces.
- Broadcast area: United Kingdom and Ireland

Programming
- Picture format: 1080p HDTV (Sky Glass); 1080i HDTV (Astra 2 satellite); 16:9 576i SDTV (Freeview)
- Timeshift service: Pick +1 (2010–2022)

Ownership
- Owner: Sky Group (Comcast)
- Sister channels: List of Sky UK channels

History
- Launched: 31 October 2005; 20 years ago
- Former names: Sky Three (2005–2008); Sky3 (2008–2011); Sky 3 (February 2011); Pick TV (2011–2013); Pick (2013–2023)

Availability

Terrestrial
- Freeview: Channel 11

Streaming media
- Sky Go: Watch live (UK and Ireland only)
- Now: Watch live (UK and Ireland only)
- Virgin TV Go: Watch live (UK only)
- Virgin TV Anywhere: Watch live (Ireland only)
- Samsung TV Plus: Channel 4155

Sky Mix (formerly Pick) is a British free-to-air television channel, owned by Sky UK. The channel originally launched on 31 October 2005 as Sky Three.

The channel's current name, which was adopted in 2023, is the second time that the "Sky Mix" brand has been used. Sky Replay was originally known as 'Sky One Mix', and previously known as 'Sky Mix' from 2004 to 2005.

== History ==
=== As Sky Three ===
Sky Three was the first free-to-air general entertainment channel from Sky since Sky One became a pay channel in 1993. It launched on 31 October 2005, replacing the Sky Travel's EPG slot on Freeview in a bid to attract more subscribers to Sky's satellite service. It was essentially a barker channel for Sky's main entertainment channel Sky One and its other subscription services, which served to "offer digital terrestrial viewers the opportunity to enjoy a wide variety of popular programmes from Sky". From its launch on until 24 June 2010, the channel carried Sky Travel's commercial presentations selling holiday deals for a number of providers.

Due to its wider availability on Freeview channel 11, the channel constantly had higher ratings than Sky Two. Sky Three was achieving on average a 1% share compared to Sky Two's 0.1–3% share. Instead of Sky selling on the terrestrial free-to-air rights for their programmes to another broadcaster, these rights are usually retained to remain exclusive to Sky.

In 2008, Sky's entertainment channels changed the wording in the logos to numbers, hence Sky Three became Sky3.

Early highlights from the channel's schedule included Futurama, Cold Case, Tru Calling, Relic Hunter, Road Wars, the Inside strand of documentaries, Brainiac: Science Abuse, Airline, and 35mm from Sky Movies (which looks at upcoming films in the cinema and on Sky's premium movies service Sky Movies) and Dream Team. The channel has also shown the free-to-air premieres of some of Sky One's more prestigious shows; such as series 3 and 4 of 24, Rescue Me, The 10th Kingdom, Hex and the latest remake of Battlestar Galactica. The channel also showed series 3 and 4 of Prison Break in 2010, Star Trek: Deep Space Nine and Star Trek: The Next Generation.

On 23 August 2010, Sky Sports News became a pay-TV channel, which was replaced on Freeview by a one-hour timeshift version of Sky3. Sky3 +1 also launched on Sky channel 223 on the same day.

A final rebrand took place in early 2011 and saw Sky 1, 2 and 3 gain similar rectangular logos to Sky News and Sky Sports.

On 1 February 2011, Sky Atlantic launched on Sky channel 108, which had originally been occupied by Sky 3.

=== As Pick TV ===
On 28 February 2011, Sky 3 changed its name to Pick TV to disassociate the channel with Sky as it began to air more programmes from the former Channel One and Bravo. Initially, the channel retained the look of the most recent rebrand which occurred a few weeks earlier.

Since its rebrand, recent Sky One shows (such as UK Border Force, Pineapple Dance Studios) and documentary series hosted by Ross Kemp (such as On Gangs and In Search of Pirates) were shown.

Sky's 2010 acquisition of Challenge from Living TV Group saw game shows and quiz-type programming move out of Pick TV. Nonetheless, it became fairly common for Pick and Challenge to cross-promote its programmes to viewers. These include regular trailers in between shows, and when a certain show finishes, the continuity announcer will usually tell viewers what is coming up next on both channels.

On 20 September 2011 at 14:00, Pick TV +1 was removed from Freeview. This was so that all of the channels owned by BSkyB could be on multiplex C and Challenge could broadcast for 24 hours a day in Wales on the platform, in-line with the rest of the UK.

In May 2012, Pick TV started broadcasting some older Sky One and Sky Living shows, and the former Channel One and Bravo shows.

On Monday 7 October 2013, "TV" was dropped from the channel's name; becoming known as simply Pick. The channel would also introduce a new look and logo. On 23 June 2016, another new logo was announced which also included a brand new look.

On 1 March 2018, Pick +1 was added back on Freeview as a Freeview HD service. A while later the channel moved from channel 97 to 92 on Freeview.

On 18 June 2020, Pick +1 was removed from Freeview channel 92. Between June and July 2020, when the Premier League resumed after lockdown, all of the remaining matches were televised due to fans not being allowed in the stadiums. Twenty-five of these matches were televised on Pick.

In its later years, the channel had an increased focus on airing Sky Showcase (Sky One's successor channel, which launched in 2021) and Sky Witness programmes 12–18 months after their original broadcasts, and as well as content tailored towards Pick.

=== As Sky Mix ===
On 3 October 2023, it was announced that Pick would rebrand on 18 October 2023 as Sky Mix. This relaunch would see the channel return to its original Freeview channel number on channel 11, and it would notably be airing the first series of the HBO drama True Detective.

In 2024, a Sky Kids–branded programming strand launched on Sky Mix; airing on weekends from 8 am to 9 am.

== Pick Paranormal ==
In 2024, Sky launched six New FAST Channels for Sky Glass and Sky Stream, one called Emergency 24/7, four with Sky branding and the last one using the Pick name. Pick Paranormal is a channel, which has also been added to the Samsung TV Plus channel list, featuring Most Haunted and programmes of a similar nature.
