= Virgin1 =

Former television channel

- Country: United Kingdom
- Broadcast area: United Kingdom; Ireland

Programming
- Picture format: 576i (SDTV)
- Timeshift service: Virgin1+1 / Channel One +1

Ownership
- Owner: Virgin Media Television (2007‍–‍2010); British Sky Broadcasting (2010–2011)

History
- Launched: 1 October 2007; 18 years ago
- Replaced: Ftn
- Closed: 1 February 2011; 15 years ago
- Replaced by: Challenge; Sky Atlantic
- Former names: Channel One (2010–2011)

Virgin1 was a British free-to-air entertainment television channel owned and operated by Virgin Media Television, later known as Living TV Group. The channel was launched on 1 October 2007 at 21:00, intended to rival BSkyB's Sky One. Virgin Media Television had spent on acquiring major franchises as well as commissioning new TV programmes in time for the channel's launch.

The channel was broadcast on Freeview, Virgin Media and Sky platforms. Virgin1 managed to achieve good ratings within a year of launching. Its broadcast hours were then extended to 24 hours, and a one‑hour time-shift, Virgin1+1, was launched, from 20 May 2009. Virgin1 received a refreshed logo along with a mascot, Red, in June 2009.

BSkyB acquired the channel on 4 June 2010 and, as a result, it was rebranded to Channel One on 3 September 2010. On 15 September 2010, BSkyB announced that it would close Channel One and sister channels Bravo and Bravo 2, which had also been purchased. Channel One closed on 1 February 2011 at 06:00 UTC and its slot was replaced by Challenge on Freeview and Sky Atlantic on Sky.

== History ==
=== Virgin1 ===
Plans for a Virgin-branded general entertainment TV channel were hatched by Virgin Media Television in 2006 to coincide with the relaunch on NTL: Telewest to Virgin Media. Virgin1 was announced in the summer of 2007. At first, the company stated that all of their other channels including Ftn, would still run as normal, but because of Ftn having a key Freeview primetime slot, this was later changed.

The channel was launched as Virgin1 at 21:00 on 1 October 2007 on all platforms (Freeview, Virgin Media and Sky) replacing former Virgin Media Television channel Ftn. Some media sources have claimed that it was intended to be in direct competition with British Sky Broadcasting's flagship channel, Sky1, which in August 2010 had a 0.8% share of the market compared with Virgin1's 0.7%. High profile shows that were purchased by Virgin Media Television to be broadcast on Virgin1 included Terminator: The Sarah Connor Chronicles, The Riches and the Star Trek franchise. Managing director of Virgin Media Television stated that there was a gap in the Freeview market for male viewers that Virgin1 was aiming to fill.

On 20 February 2008, the channel moved from FTN's old slots on channels 153 and 154 on Sky and took over Bravo's slots on channels 121 and 122, which were placed higher up on the EPG. The next day, the channel went on to achieve its highest ratings thus far, with the season premiere of Terminator: The Sarah Connor Chronicles which secured a 4.2% share of multi-channel viewers.

On 27 April 2009, it was announced that Virgin1 (on Freeview) would move from multiplex D to multiplex A, allowing the channel to broadcast 24 hours a day. Its vacated slot was used to launch a time-shifted version of the channel which broadcast from 18:00 to 06:00. In Wales, it was only available from 09:00 to 19:00, with the +1 service only available from 19:00.

First Virgin1 logo

On 14 May 2009, Virgin Media Television announced plans to revamp the channel. On 9 June 2009, it underwent a rebranding with new idents, break bumpers and onscreen identity. As part of the rebrand, a mascot called Red was introduced, a puppet character from the creator of the ITV Digital Monkey.

On 20 October 2009, the channel reduced its hours on Freeview to 09:00 – 03:00, allowing Tease Me TV to launch. The revocation of TMTV's licence in November 2010 freed up the bandwidth it used from Channel One, but it was left vacant until the closure of the channel.

From 30 October 2009, the channel briefly aired TNA iMPACT! at 21:00 (which was also shown on sister channel Bravo at the time). This was the first time wrestling has been aired on free television in the UK since 2001.

On 1 June 2010, the time-shifted version of the channel ceased broadcasting on Freeview channel 35, allowing Yesterday to extend its broadcast hours. The time-shifted service continued to operate on satellite and cable platforms, between 04:00 and 01:00 daily (the live Challenge Jackpot simulcast on Virgin1 between 00:00 and 03:00 was not time‑shifted).

=== Sky purchase and Channel One rebrand ===
Channel One logo

On 4 June 2010, British Sky Broadcasting and Virgin Media announced that they had reached an agreement for the acquisition by Sky of Virgin Media Television. Virgin1 was also a part of the deal, but was rebranded as Channel One on 3 September 2010, as the Virgin name wasn't licensed to Sky.

=== Closure ===
On 15 September 2010, BSkyB announced that it would close Channel One and its sister channels Bravo and Bravo 2. Sky, having carried out a review of the VMTV channels, found that Channel One was too similar to Sky3, with which it sat alongside as a free to air channel on Freeview. Challenge would utilise Channel One's former Freeview slot, and receive a large boost in its programming budget. At 06:00 on 1 February 2011, Channel One ceased broadcasting on all platforms; the last programme being an episode of Star Trek: Enterprise. Since its closure, many programmes, including sci-fi and drama programming, were incorporated into Sky's free-to-air channel, Pick TV (a rebranding from Sky3), whilst premium programming was moved to Sky's pay TV channels.

== Most watched broadcasts ==
The following is a list of the ten most watched shows on Channel One, based on Live +7 data supplied by BARB up to 18 October 2010.

| Rank | Show | Episode | Number of viewers | Date |
|---|---|---|---|---|
| 1 | Terminator: The Sarah Connor Chronicles | 1.01 – "Pilot" | 764,000 | 21 February 2008 |
| 2 | Warehouse 13 | 1.01 – "Pilot" | 570,000 | 8 April 2010 |
| 3 | Warehouse 13 | 1.02 – "Resonance" | 555,000 | 15 April 2010 |
| 4 | V | 1.01 – "Pilot" | 541,000 | 11 October 2010 |
| 5 | V | 1.02 – "There is No Normal Anymore" | 495,000 | 18 October 2010 |
| 6 | Warehouse 13 | 1.04 – "Claudia" | 479,000 | 29 April 2010 |
| 7 | Terminator: The Sarah Connor Chronicles | 1.03 – "The Turk" | 463,000 | 6 March 2008 |
| 8 | Terminator: The Sarah Connor Chronicles | 1.05 – "Queen's Gambit" | 450,000 | 20 March 2008 |
| 9 | Terminator: The Sarah Connor Chronicles | 1.02 – "Gnothi Seauton" | 446,000 | 28 February 2008 |
| 10 | Terminator: The Sarah Connor Chronicles | 1.04 – "Heavy Metal" | 445,000 | 13 March 2008 |

== Programming ==
The schedule for Virgin1 consisted of a mixture of British and American comedy, drama and factual programming, both acquired and commissioned. The channel was pitched between male-targeted channel Bravo and female-targeted channel Living. In addition to exclusive content, Virgin1 also showed some content from Living, Bravo and Challenge.
