= Bravo (UK & Ireland) =

Television channel in UK and Ireland

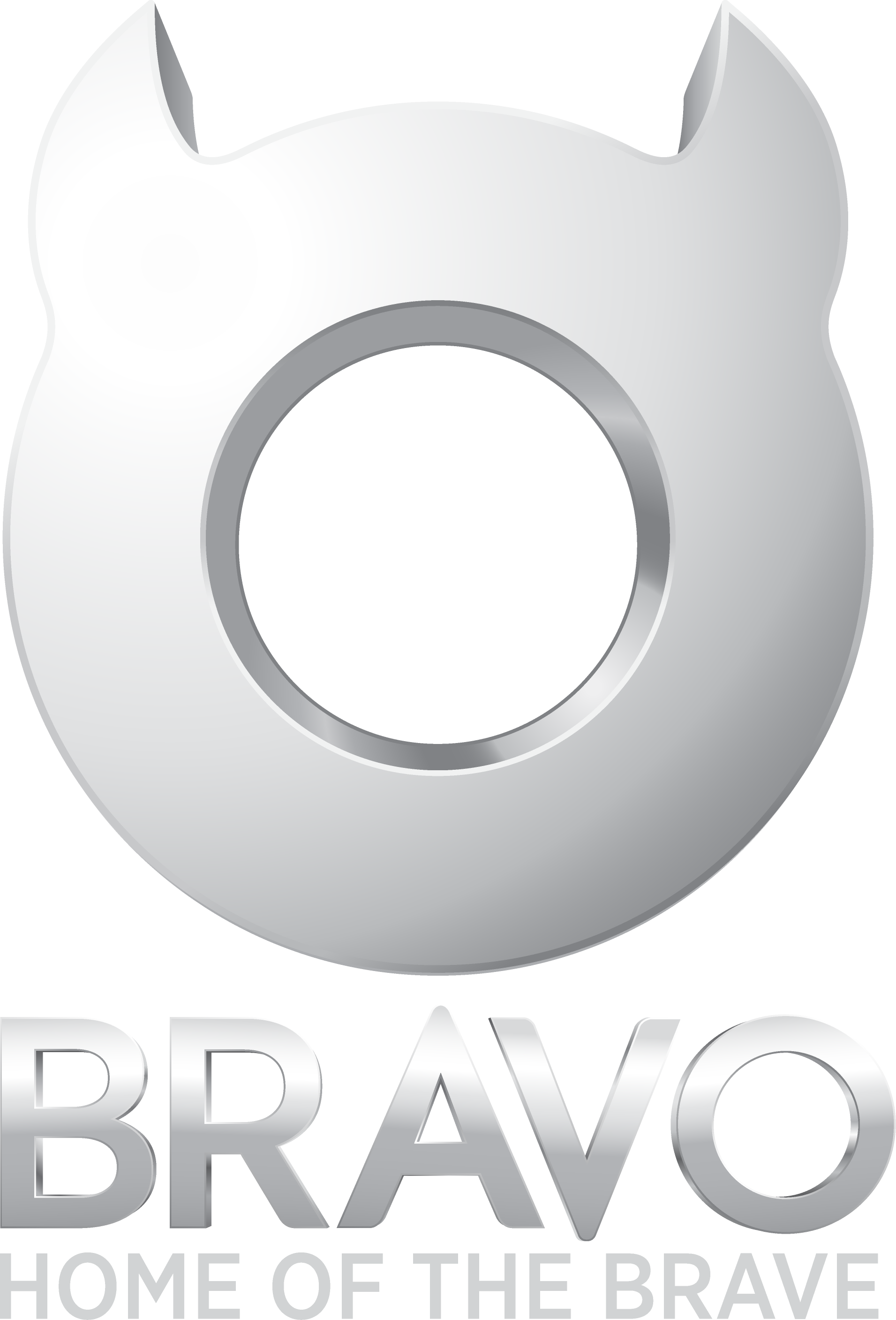
- Final logo, used until channel closure in 2011
- Country: United Kingdom

Programming
- Picture format: 16:9, 576i (SDTV)
- Timeshift service: Bravo +1

Ownership
- Owner: Living TV Group (Sky Limited)
- Sister channels: Bravo 2

History
- Launched: 1 September 1985
- Closed: 1 January 2011

Links
- Website: bravo.co.uk at the Wayback Machine (archived 13 December 2010)

Bravo was a British television channel owned by Living TV Group, a subsidiary of BSkyB. Its target audience was males in their 20s to early 40s. It broadcast a variety of both archive programming (such as Knight Rider and MacGyver) and original productions.

The Bravo channel closed down on 1 January 2011, with the most popular programmes moved to other Sky channels.

== History ==
=== Early history ===
Bravo was launched on 1 September 1985 as a cable-only channel, created by United Artists Programming broadcasting black & white B-movies from the 1950s and 1960s and vintage TV series. Initially, the channel was a cassette-delivered service provided to cable headends for automatic play-out.

In 1991, United Artists merged with their largest shareholder TCI (now Liberty Media), to form the largest cable operator in the United States. TCI and US West announced a joint venture and, in 1992, the joint venture company became Telewest Communications. In 1993, talks were held with Tele-Communications Inc. which resulted in Flextech acquiring TCI's European programming business in exchange for shares. By January, the deal was complete with TCI, allowing it to acquire 60.4% of Flextech while Flextech acquired 100% of Bravo, 25% of UK Gold, 31% of UK Living, and 25% of the Children's Channel which increased its share in that channel.

On 22 July 1993, Bravo launched on the Astra 1C satellite in anticipation of the launch of Sky Multichannels in September 1993. With the launch on Astra, the channel started broadcasting between noon and midnight (as opposed to 3 pm to 3 am).

Its programming output was altered around the same time, when the channel obtained many of the ITC Entertainment productions and other cult TV series including The Avengers. In 1990, it upgraded its on‑screen image with an elaborate station identifier of a modernist skyscraper under rolling thunderclouds and promoted itself as 'Timewarp Television'. It used both Roger Moore and Tony Curtis to feature in speciality shot trails. Armstrong and Miller made their first broadcast television appearance on Bravo in a series of presentation promotions during its Cult Weekend on 5 August 1995. James Saynor compared this phase of the channel to BBC2 under Michael Jackson.

=== Reinvention as young-adult channel (1996–2000s) ===
In 1996, a policy change to withdraw the black & white shows contributed to the channel moving on to specialise in science fiction and horror with movies from the Troma Entertainment catalogue. It then became known for showing crime documentaries by day and adult programming at night.

On 3 February 1997, Flextech launched Trouble, which took over the channel's afternoon and early evening broadcast hours, meaning Bravo would broadcast between 8 pm to 6 am. During mornings, European Business News time shared with the channel on weekdays and Living on weekends until 2001. With the change in hours, Bravo was given a refreshed look, being branded as "an altered species of television", applying to the increased number of adult-focused programmes. The channel began to air Extreme Championship Wrestling's show ECW Hardcore TV around this time; as well as ECW's biggest events, including what were pay-per-views in the US, up to January 2001.

=== Addition of sports and acquired programming ===
Over the later years, Bravo decreased the adult content shown and increased sports and imported shows such as Alias. Bravo aired World Championship Wrestling's flagship show Nitro during WCW's final year in business (2000–2001).

On 28 August 2005, the channel started showing Serie A Italian football, bringing back the Channel 4 format Football Italia.

On 2 March 2006, a sister channel called Player was launched, which originally aired as a late-night block on fellow-Flextech channel Challenge. Player aired programming aimed at a similar audience to Bravo, alongside the addition of gambling-related shows.

On 28 September 2006, Bravo introduced a brand new graphics package to memorate its 21st birthday, which coincided with the full rebranding of Player as Bravo 2.

Poor viewing figures resulted first in the cancellation of the weekly Gazetta Football Italia show, then the announcement that Bravo would stop showing Italian Football altogether after 23 December 2006. The channel's other highest-profile sports coverage was Ultimate Fighting Championship archives, for which it held exclusive UK rights, as well as recent events (live rights are now held by BT Sport), as well as the related reality TV show The Ultimate Fighter.

From January 2007, Bravo's sister channel Bravo 2, which had launched three months earlier, had the exclusive UK rights to broadcast Total Nonstop Action Wrestling programming, a two-day delay from the American broadcast of TNA's weekly show TNA iMPACT! and a three-day delay for TNA's monthly Pay Per Views. (On 3 February 2011, this programming moved to Challenge, and is now known as Impact Wrestling.) On 5 January 2008, TNA iMPACT was moved to Bravo with replays of the show on Bravo 2. Bravo's original contract for TNA Wrestling programming was for eighteen months and was distributed by RDA TV; the deal, which was once again negotiated by RDA TV, was extended on 1 July 2008 for an additional eighteen months.

From 3 June 2008, Bravo, along with the other VMT-owned channels began broadcasting in widescreen (16:9). This was coupled with a redesign of the on-screen graphic; the word "BRAVO" was shown rather than the logo.

=== "Home of the Brave" and closure (2010–2011) ===
Bravo's on-screen card after it ceased broadcasting.

On 25 May 2010, Virgin Media Television unveiled new channel branding for Bravo to coincide with a major new series Spartacus: Blood and Sand. It involved a new logo to "match the premium content and ambition of the channel" along with a new strapline, "Bravo: Home of the Brave".

On 15 September 2010, BSkyB announced that it would close Bravo as well as its sister channel Bravo 2.

For November 2010, Bravo rebranded as Brav-Mo to celebrate Movember.

From 24 to 31 December 2010, Bravo celebrated its final week with a marathon of its most popular shows called "Bravo, We Salute You".

On the morning of 1 January 2011, Bravo ceased broadcasting on all platforms. The last programme aired was World's Most Amazing Videos. Following the closure, the Bravo programmes (as well as the Channel One programmes) were moved to Pick TV in May 2012.

As of August 2013, BSkyB had registered the trademark for 'Sky Bravo'.
