= Motorway Cops =

- Directed by: Marc Tiley
- Narrated by: Jamie Theakston
- Country of origin: United Kingdom
- Original language: English
- No. of series: 7
- No. of episodes: 33

Production
- Production location: United Kingdom
- Running time: 60 minutes
- Production company: Mentorn

Original release
- Network: BBC One
- Release: 14 January 2008 – 10 September 2015

Related
- Traffic Cops; Sky Cops

Motorway Cops is a British documentary series broadcast on BBC One which follows Road Policing Units from various UK police forces.

== Concept ==
The show follows the day-to-day role of traffic officers and the incidents they come across. The majority of filming takes place at the scene of incidents, with occasional cuts to police stations and interview rooms. Locations include Yorkshire, Cheshire, Humberside and the West Midlands.

Series 1 followed Central Motorway Police Group, Cheshire Constabulary and Humberside Police, series 2, 3 and 4 followed Central Motorway Police Group, series 5 followed Central Motorway Police Group, West Yorkshire Police and Yorkshire and the Humber Regional Roads Crime Team, series 6 and 7 followed West Yorkshire Police.

== Production ==
Motorway Cops, along with its sister series Traffic Cops, are produced by Folio Productions, a subsidiary of Mentorn Media. Both shows were broadcast on the BBC until 2016. Jamie Theakston narrated all seven series of Motorway Cops. On 28 June 2016, Mentorn Media announced that Traffic Cops had been recommissioned by Channel 5, but there was no mention of Motorway Cops.

== Episodes ==
=== Series overview ===
Series	Episodes	Originally released	
Series	Episodes	First released	Last released
1	8	14 January 2008	5 May 2010
2	5	7 September 2010	25 August 2011
3	4	3 October 2011	2 February 2012
4	4	18 March 2013	10 April 2013
5	7	2 September 2013	14 January 2014
6	4	7 August 2014	16 July 2015
7	1	10 September 2015	

=== Series 1 (2008–10) ===
No. overall	No. in season	Title	Original release date
1	1	"Traffic Cops Special"	14 January 2008
2	2	"Traffic Cops Special (Rush-Hour Roulette)"	26 March 2008
3	3	"Dicing with Death"	25 September 2008
This episode famously shows the bizarre incident of Swedish twin sisters Ursula and Sabina Eriksson running onto the M6 motorway and getting struck by a lorry and a Volkswagen Polo, respectively. By coincidence, the camera crew filming the episode happened to be accompanying the police who responded to the incident, and were able to capture the events that took place.
4	4	"Fatal Consequences"	6 October 2008
5	5	"Highway Robbery"	26 January 2009
6	6	"Deadly Highways"	25 August 2009
7	7	"Catch Us If You Can"	2 September 2010
8	8	"Secrets and Lies"	5 May 2010

=== Series 2 (2010–11) ===
No. overall	No. in season	Title	Original release date
9	1	"Wrecked and Reckless"	7 September 2010
10	2	"Lost in Translation"	4 January 2011
11	3	"Deadly Distractions"	11 January 2011
12	4	"The Sixth Sense"	18 April 2011
13	5	"Booze and Twos"	25 September 2011

=== Series 3 (2011–12) ===
No. overall	No. in season	Title	Original release date
14	1	"Cheats and Chancers"	3 October 2011
15	2	"Life in the Fast Lane"	17 October 2011
16	3	"Burden of Proof"	10 January 2012
17	4	"Hide and Seek"	2 February 2012

=== Series 4 (2013) ===
No. overall	No. in season	Title	Original release date
18	1	"Lights Out"	18 March 2013
19	2	"Off and Running"	25 March 2013
20	3	"Extreme Measures"	3 April 2013
21	4	"Rule Breakers and Risk Takers"	10 April 2013

=== Series 5 (2013–14) ===
No. overall	No. in season	Title	Original release date
22	1	"Excuses, Excuses"	2 September 2013
23	2	"Duty of Care"	9 September 2013
24	3	"Right Time, Right Place"	16 September 2013
25	4	"Without Warning"	23 September 2013
26	5	"Out of Control"	30 September 2013
27	6	"White Lines"	7 October 2013
28	7	"Dangerous Highways"	14 January 2014

=== Series 6 (2014–15) ===
No. overall	No. in season	Title	Original release date
29	1	"Human Traffic"	7 August 2014
30	2	"Tip-Offs and Tearaways"	21 August 2014
31	3	"Riding into Trouble"	28 August 2014
32	4	"Keeping Up Appearances"	16 July 2015

=== Series 7 (2015) ===
No. overall	No. in season	Title	Original release date
33	1	"Breakdown"	10 September 2015

== See also ==
- Traffic Cops - sister series broadcast on Channel 5.
- Sky Cops - sister series broadcast on BBC One.
- Police Interceptors - series broadcast on Channel 5 with a similar format.
- Brit Cops - police documentary series originally on Bravo and now on Sky Livingit.
- Road Wars - programme broadcast on Sky1, Sky2, and Pick TV which is about Road Traffic Police.
- Street Wars - programme broadcast on Sky about police officers "on the beat".
- Police Camera Action! - series broadcast on ITV with a similar format.
