= Sky Cops =

Television series

- Directed by: David Skudder
- Narrated by: Jamie Theakston
- Country of origin: United Kingdom
- Original language: English
- No. of series: 3
- No. of episodes: 20

Production
- Production location: United Kingdom
- Running time: 60 minutes 30 minutes
- Production company: Steadfast Television

Original release
- Network: BBC One
- Release: 13 September 2006 – 15 October 2008

Related
- Traffic Cops; Motorway Cops

Sky Cops is a British documentary series broadcast on BBC One revealing the work of the air police in the UK. The show, which was first broadcast from 2006 to 2008, follows police helicopters from the South Yorkshire Air Operations Unit and the Metropolitan Police Air Support Unit.

== Pilots ==
- Captain Doug Hale - South Yorkshire Police
- Captain Chris Daly - Metropolitan Police

== Episodes ==
=== Series overview ===
Series	Episodes	Originally released	
Series	Episodes	First released	Last released
1	5	13 September 2006	18 October 2006
2	6	1 February 2008	31 July 2008
3	7	20 August 2008	15 October 2008

=== Series 1 (2006) ===
No. overall	No. in season	Title	Original release date
1	1	"Bang to Rights"	13 September 2006
2	2	"Cycle of Crime"	20 September 2006
3	3	"Turning the Tide"	4 October 2006
4	4	"In the Nick of Time"	11 October 2006
5	5	"No Hiding Place"	18 October 2006

=== Series 2 (2008) ===
No. overall	No. in season	Title	Original release date
6	1	"Flat Out"	1 February 2008
7	2	"Night and Day"	4 July 2008
8	3	"Operation Ocean"	11 July 2008
9	4	"On the Ball"	18 July 2008
10	5	"25/07/2008"	25 July 2008
11	6	"Bad Boys"	31 July 2008

=== Series 3 (2008) ===
No. overall	No. in season	Title	Original release date
12	1	"New Tricks"	20 August 2008
13	2	"Rookies"	27 August 2008
14	3	"Under Pressure"	3 September 2008
15	4	"Two Wheel Terrors"	10 September 2008
16	5	"Gone to the Dogs"	17 September 2008
17	6	"Tooled Up"	24 September 2008
18	7	"Sparks Flying"	15 October 2008

== See also ==
- Traffic Cops - sister series broadcast on Channel 5.
- Motorway Cops - sister series broadcast on BBC One.
- Helicopter Heroes - series broadcast on BBC One following the Yorkshire Air Ambulance.
- Police Interceptors - series broadcast on Channel 5 with a similar format.
- Brit Cops - police documentary series originally on Bravo and now on Sky Livingit.
- Road Wars - programme broadcast on Sky1, Sky2, and Pick TV which is about Road Traffic Police.
- Street Wars - programme broadcast on Sky about police officers "on the beat".
- Police Camera Action! - series broadcast on ITV with a similar format.
