= Traffic Cops =

Television series

- Also known as: All New Traffic Cops: Under Attack (series 15 & 16); Traffic Cops: On The Edge (series 17); Traffic Cops: Pursuit Squad One (series 26)
- Directed by: Bruce Lippold; Chris Greenwood; Craig Duncan
- Narrated by: Jamie Theakston (2003–2015, 2016–); Steven Mackintosh (2016)
- Composers: Ivor Goldberg & Julian Hamlin 2002–2015 (All BBC Transmissions); Theme Tune – 3 versions on air from 2002–2015
- Country of origin: United Kingdom
- Original language: English
- No. of series: 28
- No. of episodes: 300

Production
- Production location: United Kingdom
- Running time: 60 minutes
- Production company: Mentorn Media

Original release
- Network: BBC One (2003–2015); BBC Three (2016); Channel 5 (2016–present)
- Release: 18 March 2003 – present

Related
- Motorway Cops; Sky Cops

Traffic Cops is a British documentary series broadcast on Channel 5, following Roads Policing Units from various UK police forces. It has consistently been one of the most watched factual series on UK television.

The show is currently on its twenty-eighth series, having begun airing on BBC One in 2003.

== Concept ==
The show follows the day-to-day role of a traffic officer and the incidents they come across. The majority of filming takes place at the scene of incidents, with occasional cuts to police stations and interview rooms. Locations include Derbyshire, Yorkshire, Hampshire, Humberside, South Wales, Sussex, Bedfordshire, and Hertfordshire.

The current series follows officers from the Roads Policing Unit and Specialist ANPR Level 2 Crime Unit (also called Road Crime Unit) of Derbyshire Constabulary. Previous series have followed North Yorkshire Police, South Yorkshire Police, Hampshire Constabulary, Humberside Police, South Wales Police, Sussex Police, Bedfordshire Police, Hertfordshire Constabulary and West Yorkshire Police.

The show is currently airing on Channel 5, branded simply as Traffic Cops, having been previously branded (since moving to Channel 5) as, All New Traffic Cops, Traffic Cops: Under Attack, Traffic Cops: On The Edge, and Traffic Cops: Pursuit Squad One. It remains following the Roads Policing Unit, and the Operational Support Units. It also follows some promoted officers in their role on district as they continue policing the roads.

== Production ==
Traffic Cops, along with its sister series Motorway Cops, are produced by Folio Productions, a subsidiary of Mentorn Media. Both shows were broadcast on the BBC until 2016. Between 2003 and 2015, Jamie Theakston narrated the programme. The final series on the BBC in 2016 was narrated by Steven Mackintosh. On 28 June 2016, Mentorn Media announced that the show had been recommissioned by Channel 5, and would mark a return of Theakston with an "expanded on-screen role".

== Episodes ==
There have been a total of 28 series and 300 episodes as of 2026.

=== Series overview ===
Series	Episodes	Originally released			Subject(s)
Series	Episodes	First released	Last released	Network	Subject(s)
1	14	18 March 2003	18 December 2003	BBC One	South Yorkshire Police
2	6	26 January 2004	19 September 2004	BBC One	South Yorkshire Police
3	8	16 May 2005	26 September 2005	BBC One	Cheshire Police
4	12	2 May 2006	27 June 2006	BBC One	Hampshire Constabulary
5	9	9 May 2007	22 October 2007	BBC One	Humberside Police
6	11	26 March 2008	30 October 2008	BBC One	Humberside Police & South Yorkshire Police
7	6	6 April 2009	14 October 2009	BBC One	South Wales Police
8	9	8 April 2010	7 October 2010	BBC One	South Wales Police & Sussex Police
9	7	23 June 2011	11 August 2011	BBC One	Bedfordshire Police
10	6	2 May 2012	12 December 2012	BBC One	Bedfordshire Police & Hertfordshire Constabulary
11	5	18 February 2014	10 July 2014	BBC One	West Yorkshire Police
12	1	27 May 2015		BBC One	North Yorkshire Police
13	5	30 July 2015	26 October 2015	BBC One	North Yorkshire Police
14	4	21 January 2016	11 February 2016	BBC Three	North Yorkshire Police
15	7	14 November 2016	30 January 2017	Channel 5	North Yorkshire Police & West Yorkshire Police
16	21	20 March 2017	7 December 2017	Channel 5	North Yorkshire Police & West Yorkshire Police
17	6	29 May 2018	24 July 2018	Channel 5	North Yorkshire Police
18	15	6 August 2018	4 March 2019	Channel 5	North Yorkshire Police
19	24	20 May 2019	9 March 2020	Channel 5	Derbyshire Constabulary
20	6	20 April 2020	12 August 2020	Channel 5	Derbyshire Constabulary
21	18	22 February 2021	26 July 2021	Channel 5	Derbyshire Constabulary
22	11	22 November 2021	7 February 2022	Channel 5	Derbyshire Constabulary
23	11	14 February 2022	2 May 2022	Channel 5	Derbyshire Constabulary
24	19	2 January 2023	8 May 2023	Channel 5	North Yorkshire Police
25	34	4 December 2023	1 December 2025	Channel 5	Derbyshire Constabulary
26	2	15 September 2025	22 September 2025	Channel 5	North Yorkshire Police
27	16	6 October 2025	8 December 2025	Channel 5	Derbyshire Constabulary
28	TBC	5 October 2026	TBC	Channel 5	North Yorkshire Police

=== Series 1 (2003) ===
No. overall	No. in series	Title	Original release date
1	1	"Picking Up the Pieces"	18 March 2003
2	2	"Hardliners"	25 March 2003
3	3	"Smashed"	1 April 2003
4	4	"Fatal Attraction"	8 April 2003
5	5	"Seeing Red"	15 April 2003
6	6	"Mad, Bad and Dangerous"	22 April 2003
7	7	"Law Breakers"	29 April 2003
8	8	"Dead End"	4 May 2003
9	9	"Impact"	31 July 2003
10	10	"Wrecked and Reckless"	7 August 2003
11	11	"Takeaway"	18 November 2003
12	12	"After Dark"	4 December 2003
13	13	"Twockers"	11 December 2003
14	14	"Right Time, Right Place"	18 December 2003

=== Series 2 (2004) ===
No. overall	No. in series	Title	Original release date
15	1	"Too Young to Die"	26 January 2004
16	2	"Over the Limit"	12 April 2004
17	3	"Losing Control"	20 April 2004
18	4	"On the Loose"	19 May 2004
19	5	"Bad Attitude"	13 June 2004
20	6	"Under Pressure"	19 September 2004

=== Series 3 (2005) ===
No. overall	No. in series	Title	Original release date
21	1	"Darkness Before Dawn"	16 May 2005
22	2	"Caught by Surprise"	23 May 2005
23	3	"Smelling a Rat"	30 May 2005
24	4	"Cause & Defect"	6 June 2005
25	5	"Chancers"	13 June 2005
26	6	"Dizzies"	20 June 2005
27	7	"Bad People"	18 August 2005
28	8	"No Respect"	26 September 2005

=== Series 4 (2006) ===
No. overall	No. in series	Title	Original release date
29	1	"Fatal Distraction"	2 May 2006
30	2	"Running into Trouble"	9 May 2006
31	3	"Hit & Run"	16 May 2006
32	4	"Small Hours, Big Trouble"	23 May 2006
33	5	"Playing the Game"	31 May 2006
34	6	"Pushing Their Luck"	6 June 2006
35	7	"Weapon of Destruction"	13 June 2006
36	8	"In the Red"	20 June 2006
37	9	"Under the Gun"	27 June 2006
38	10	"Selling A Line"	4 July 2006
39	11	"Striking it Lucky"	4 July 2006
40	12	"Non-Stop Trouble"	4 July 2006

=== Series 5 (2007) ===
No. overall	No. in series	Title	Original release date
41	1	"Trailing Destruction"	9 May 2007
42	2	"A Stab in the Dark"	16 May 2007
43	3	"Running Wild"	30 May 2007
44	4	"Bad Boys"	6 June 2007
45	5	"Something to Hide"	13 June 2007
46	6	"Walking the Line"	20 June 2007
47	7	"Desperate Measures"	15 August 2007
48	8	"Crashed Out"	5 September 2007
49	9	"Under Fire"	22 October 2007

=== Series 6 (2008) ===
No. overall	No. in series	Title	Original release date
50	1	"Identity Crisis"	2 April 2008
51	2	"Trouble in Store"	9 April 2008
52	3	"Chasing the Dragon"	16 April 2008
53	4	"Riding Their Luck"	23 April 2008
54	5	"School's Out"	30 April 2008
55	6	"Crash Course"	3 June 2008
56	7	"Caught Napping"	23 June 2008
57	8	"The Best Job in the World"	9 October 2008
58	9	"Joy-Riding"	16 October 2008
59	10	"Cheating Death"	23 October 2008
60	11	"Dog Day Afternoon"	30 October 2008

=== Series 7 (2009) ===
No. overall	No. in series	Title	Original release date
61	1	"Creepers"	6 April 2009
62	2	"Hidden Treasure"	16 April 2009
63	3	"A Turn for the Worse"	23 April 2009
64	4	"No Mood for Trouble"	4 June 2009
65	5	"Cameras Don't Lie"	11 June 2009
66	6	"Out of Control"	14 October 2009

=== Series 8 (2010) ===
No. overall	No. in series	Title	Original release date
67	1	"Prying Eyes"	8 April 2010
68	2	"Close Encounters"	14 April 2010
69	3	"A Nose for Trouble"	20 April 2010
70	4	"Lost and Found"	8 July 2010
71	5	"Crossing the Line"	21 July 2010
72	6	"Moment of Madness"	28 July 2010
73	7	"Cat and Mouse"	13 September 2010
74	8	"Age Old Problem"	20 September 2010
75	9	"Wheels of Fortune"	7 October 2010

=== Series 9 (2011) ===
No. overall	No. in series	Title	Original release date
76	1	"Running on Empty"	23 June 2011
77	2	"Wrong Place Wrong Time"	7 July 2011
78	3	"Tickets Credits and Consequences"	14 July 2011
79	4	"In for a Shock"	21 July 2011
80	5	"Crossover"	28 July 2011
81	6	"One Thing Leads to Another"	4 August 2011
82	7	"Risky Business"	11 August 2011

=== Series 10 (2012) ===
No. overall	No. in series	Title	Original release date
83	1	"Worse For Wear"	2 May 2012
84	2	"It Could Be You"	9 May 2012
85	3	"In the Doghouse"	25 June 2012
86	4	"Killer on the Loose"	5 July 2012
87	5	"Bash Cash"	12 July 2012
88	6	"In the Line of Duty"	12 December 2012

=== Series 11 (2014) ===
No. overall	No. in series	Title	Original release date
89	1	"Every Day's A School Day"	18 February 2014
90	2	"The Ones That Got Away"	25 February 2014
91	3	"Catch Me If You Can"	4 March 2014
92	4	"We've Got Runners"	9 June 2014
93	5	"Caught on Camera"	10 July 2014

=== Series 12 (2015) ===
No. overall	No. in series	Title	Original release date
94	1	"Rural Raiders"	27 May 2015

=== Series 13 (2015) ===
No. overall	No. in series	Title	Original release date
95	1	"Road Crime"	30 July 2015
96	2	"Excess Alcohol"	6 August 2015
97	3	"Control"	20 August 2015
98	4	"One for the Road"	19 October 2015
99	5	"Cops & Robbers"	26 October 2015

=== Series 14 (2016) ===
No. overall	No. in series	Title	Original release date
100	1	"Deals on Wheels"	21 January 2016
101	2	"Drivers Behaving Badly"	28 January 2016
102	3	"The Ripple Effect"	4 February 2016
103	4	"In the Pursuit of Crime"	11 February 2016

=== All New Traffic Cops, Series 15 (2016–17) ===
The show was renamed All New Traffic Cops for this series.

No. overall	No. in series	Title	Original release date
104	1	"Episode 1"	14 November 2016
105	2	"Episode 2"	21 November 2016
106	3	"Episode 3"	28 November 2016
107	4	"Episode 4"	5 December 2016
108	5	"Episode 5"	12 December 2016
109	6	"Episode 6"	19 December 2016
110	7	"Episode 7: Best Of.."	30 January 2017

=== All New Traffic Cops, Series 16 (2017) ===
The first six episodes were subtitled Under Attack

No. overall	No. in series	Title	Original release date
111	1	"Episode 1: Under Attack"	20 March 2017
112	2	"Episode 2: Under Attack"	27 March 2017
113	3	"Episode 3: Under Attack"	3 April 2017
114	4	"Episode 4: Under Attack"	10 April 2017
115	5	"Episode 5: Under Attack"	17 April 2017
116	6	"Episode 6: Under Attack"	24 April 2017
117	7	"Episode 7"	3 July 2017
118	8	"Episode 8"	10 July 2017
119	9	"Episode 9"	17 July 2017
120	10	"Episode 10"	24 July 2017
121	11	"Episode 11"	31 July 2017
122	12	"Episode 12"	7 August 2017
123	13	"Episode 13"	14 August 2017
124	14	"Episode 14"	21 August 2017
125	15	"Episode 15"	28 August 2017
126	16	"Episode 16"	4 September 2017
127	17	"Episode 17"	23 October 2017
128	18	"Episode 18"	30 October 2017
129	19	"Episode 19"	6 November 2017
130	20	"Episode 20"	13 November 2017
131	21	"Episode 21: Christmas Special"	7 December 2017

=== Traffic Cops: On The Edge, Series 17 (2018) ===
This series is subtitled On The Edge

No. overall	No. in series	Title	Original release date
132	1	"Episode 1: Drug Busts Special"	29 May 2018
133	2	"Episode 2"	4 June 2018
134	3	"Episode 3"	25 June 2018
135	4	"Episode 4"	9 July 2018
136	5	"Episode 5"	16 July 2018
137	6	"Episode 6"	24 July 2018

=== Series 18 (2018–19) ===
No. overall	No. in series	Title	Original release date
138	1	"Episode 1"	6 August 2018
139	2	"Episode 2"	13 August 2018
140	3	"Episode 3"	27 August 2018
141	4	"Episode 4: Under Siege"	17 September 2018
142	5	"Episode 5"	24 September 2018
143	6	"Episode 6"	1 October 2018
144	7	"Episode 7"	8 October 2018
145	8	"Episode 8"	15 October 2018
146	9	"Episode 9: Biker Hell"	22 October 2018
147	10	"Episode 10"	28 January 2019
148	11	"Episode 11"	4 February 2019
149	12	"Episode 12"	11 February 2019
150	13	"Episode 13"	18 February 2019
151	14	"Episode 14"	25 February 2019
152	15	"Episode 15"	4 March 2019

=== Series 19 (2019–20) ===
No. overall	No. in series	Title	Original release date
153	1	"Episode 1: Reign of Terror"	20 May 2019
154	2	"Episode 2"	29 July 2019
155	3	"Episode 3"	5 August 2019
156	4	"Episode 4"	12 August 2019
157	5	"Episode 5"	26 August 2019
158	6	"Episode 6"	2 September 2019
159	7	"Episode 7"	9 September 2019
160	8	"Episode 8"	7 October 2019
161	9	"Episode 9"	14 October 2019
162	10	"Episode 10"	21 October 2019
163	11	"Episode 11"	28 October 2019
164	12	"Episode 12"	4 November 2019
165	13	"Episode 13"	11 November 2019
166	14	"Episode 14"	18 November 2019
167	15	"Episode 15"	25 November 2019
168	16	"Episode 16"	13 January 2020
169	17	"Episode 17"	20 January 2020
170	18	"Episode 18"	27 January 2020
171	19	"Episode 19"	3 February 2020
172	20	"Episode 20"	10 February 2020
173	21	"Episode 21"	17 February 2020
174	22	"Episode 22"	24 February 2020
175	23	"Episode 23"	2 March 2020
176	24	"Episode 24"	9 March 2020

=== Series 20 (2020) ===
No. overall	No. in series	Title	Original release date
177	1	"Episode 1: Manhunt"	20 April 2020
178	2	"Episode 2"	15 July 2020
179	3	"Episode 3"	22 July 2020
180	4	"Episode 4"	29 July 2020
181	5	"Episode 5"	5 August 2020
182	6	"Episode 6"	12 August 2020

=== Series 21 (2021) ===
No. overall	No. in series	Title	Original release date
183	1	"Episode 1"	22 February 2021
184	2	"Episode 2"	1 March 2021
185	3	"Episode 3"	8 March 2021
186	4	"Episode 4"	15 March 2021
187	5	"Episode 5"	22 March 2021
188	6	"Episode 6"	29 March 2021
189	7	"Episode 7"	12 April 2021
190	8	"Episode 8"	19 April 2021
191	9	"Episode 9"	26 April 2021
192	10	"Episode 10"	3 May 2021
193	11	"Episode 11"	10 May 2021
194	12	"Episode 12"	17 May 2021
195	13	"Episode 13"	24 May 2021
196	14	"Episode 14"	31 May 2021
197	15	"Episode 15"	7 June 2021
198	16	"Episode 16"	12 July 2021
199	17	"Episode 17"	19 July 2021
200	18	"Episode 18"	26 July 2021

=== Series 22 (2021–22) ===
No. overall	No. in series	Title	Original release date
201	1	"Episode 1"	22 November 2021
202	2	"Episode 2"	29 November 2021
203	3	"Episode 3"	13 December 2021
204	4	"Episode 4"	20 December 2021
205	5	"Episode 5"	28 December 2021
206	6	"Episode 6"	3 January 2022
207	7	"Episode 7"	10 January 2022
208	8	"Episode 8"	17 January 2022
209	9	"Episode 9"	24 January 2022
210	10	"Episode 10"	31 January 2022
211	11	"Episode 11"	7 February 2022

=== Series 23 (2022) ===
No. overall	No. in series	Title	Original release date
212	1	"Episode 1"	14 February 2022
213	2	"Episode 2"	21 February 2022
214	3	"Episode 3"	28 February 2022
215	4	"Episode 4"	7 March 2022
216	5	"Episode 5"	14 March 2022
217	6	"Episode 6"	21 March 2022
218	7	"Episode 7"	28 March 2022
219	8	"Episode 8"	4 April 2022
220	9	"Episode 9"	11 April 2022
221	10	"Episode 10"	25 April 2022
222	11	"Episode 11"	2 May 2022

=== Series 24 (2023) ===
No. overall	No. in series	Title	Original release date
223	1	"Episode 1"	2 January 2023
224	2	"Episode 2"	9 January 2023
225	3	"Episode 3"	16 January 2023
226	4	"Episode 4"	23 January 2023
227	5	"Episode 5"	30 January 2023
228	6	"Episode 6"	6 February 2023
229	7	"Episode 7"	13 February 2023
230	8	"Episode 8"	20 February 2023
231	9	"Episode 9"	27 February 2023
232	10	"Episode 10"	6 March 2023
233	11	"Episode 11"	13 March 2023
234	12	"Episode 12"	20 March 2023
235	13	"Episode 13"	27 March 2023
236	14	"Episode 14"	3 April 2023
237	15	"Episode 15"	10 April 2023
238	16	"Episode 16"	17 April 2023
239	17	"Episode 17"	24 April 2023
240	18	"Episode 18"	1 May 2023
241	19	"Episode 19"	8 May 2023

=== Series 25 (2023–25) ===
No. overall	No. in series	Title	Original release date
242	1	"Episode 1"	4 December 2023
243	2	"Episode 2"	18 December 2023
244	3	"Episode 3"	27 December 2023
245	4	"Episode 4"	8 January 2024
246	5	"Episode 5"	15 January 2024
247	6	"Episode 6"	22 January 2024
248	7	"Episode 7"	29 January 2024
249	8	"Episode 8"	5 February 2024
250	9	"Episode 9"	12 February 2024
251	10	"Episode 10"	19 February 2024
252	11	"Episode 11"	26 February 2024
253	12	"Episode 12"	4 March 2024
254	13	"Episode 13"	11 March 2024
255	14	"Episode 14"	18 March 2024
256	15	"Episode 15"	25 March 2024
257	16	"Episode 16"	16 October 2024
258	17	"Episode 17"	23 October 2024
259	18	"Episode 18"	30 October 2024
260	19	"Episode 19"	6 November 2024
261	20	"Episode 20"	30 December 2024
262	21	"Episode 21"	6 January 2025
263	22	"Episode 22"	13 January 2025
264	23	"Episode 23"	20 January 2025
265	24	"Episode 24"	27 January 2025
266	25	"Episode 25"	3 February 2025
267	26	"Episode 26"	10 February 2025
268	27	"Episode 27"	17 February 2025
269	28	"Episode 28"	24 February 2025
270	29	"Episode 29"	3 March 2025
271	30	"Episode 30"	10 March 2025
272	31	"Episode 31"	17 March 2025
273	32	"Episode 32"	24 March 2025
274	33	"Episode 33"	31 March 2025
275	34	"Episode 34: Over the Limit"	1 December 2025

=== Traffic Cops: Pursuit Squad One, Series 26 (2025) ===
This series is subtitled Pursuit Squad One

No. overall	No. in series	Title	Original release date
276	1	"Episode 1"	15 September 2025
277	2	"Episode 2"	22 September 2025

=== Series 27 (2025-26) ===
No. overall	No. in series	Title	Original release date
278	1	"Episode 1"	6 October 2025
279	2	"Episode 2"	15 October 2025
280	3	"Episode 3"	22 October 2025
281	4	"Episode 4"	29 October 2025
282	5	"Episode 5"	5 November 2025
283	6	"Episode 6"	12 November 2025
284	7	"Episode 7"	19 November 2025
285	8	"Episode 8"	26 November 2025
286	9	"Episode 9"	8 December 2025
287	10	"Episode 10"	17 April 2026
288	11	"Episode 11"	24 April 2026
289	12	"Episode 12"	1 May 2026
290	13	"Episode 13"	15 May 2026
291	14	"Episode 14"	22 May 2026
292	15	"Episode 15"	29 May 2026
293	16	"Episode 16"	5 June 2026

=== Traffic Cops: Elite Squad One, Series 28 (2026) ===
This series is subtitled Elite Squad One

No. overall	No. in series	Title	Original release date
294	1	"Episode 1"	5 October 2026
295	2	"Episode 2"	12 October 2026
296	3	"Episode 3"	19 October 2026
297	4	"Episode 4"	26 October 2026
298	5	"Episode 5"	2 November 2026
299	6	"Episode 6"	9 November 2026
300	7	"Episode 7"	16 November 2026

== See also ==
- Motorway Cops – sister series broadcast on BBC One.
- Sky Cops – sister series broadcast on BBC One.
- Police Interceptors – series broadcast on Channel 5 with a similar format.
- Brit Cops – police documentary series originally on Bravo and now on Sky Livingit.
- Road Wars – programme broadcast on Sky1, Sky2, and Pick TV which is about Road Traffic Police.
- Street Wars – programme broadcast on Sky about police officers "on the beat".
- Police Camera Action! – series broadcast on ITV with a similar format.
