= Ursula and Sabina Eriksson =

Swedish twins involved in a shared psychotic episode

Ursula Eriksson and Sabina Eriksson (born 3 November 1967) are Swedish twin sisters who got media coverage in May 2008. They had been in Ireland before travelling to the United Kingdom, and boarding a coach for London in Liverpool. After exiting the bus at Keele service station on the M6 motorway, their odd behaviour caused the driver to not allow them back on board.

The two were later seen on the central reservation of the M6 motorway. When Highways Agency traffic officers arrived to assist the women, they ran across the busy motorway, as captured by a small television crew. Ursula managed to dodge traffic, but Sabina was knocked over. Shortly after police arrived, the women again dashed onto the motorway and were struck by oncoming vehicles. Ursula suffered serious injuries, and when Sabina regained consciousness, she refused medical aid and attacked a police officer, at which point she was arrested and sedated.

Appearing calm, though behaving unusually, Sabina was processed by police in Stoke-on-Trent and was later released from custody. Shortly afterwards, she was seen and taken in by Glenn Hollinshead, of Fenton, Staffordshire, whom she suddenly stabbed to death the next day. Sabina was then pursued, running from the scene and arrested in hospital after jumping from a bridge onto a busy trunk road.

Despite these incidents, there was no evidence that alcohol or other drugs were involved in the incidents on the M6 or the killing of Hollinshead. Sabina later pleaded guilty to manslaughter with diminished responsibility, after an apparent episode of folie à deux (or "shared psychosis"), a rare psychiatric disorder in which delusional beliefs are transmitted from one individual to another. As identical twins sharing the same genetic makeup, the chances of such psychiatric disorders may be increased. Ursula was released from the hospital after recovering and now lives in Bellevue, Washington, US, but Sabina was sentenced to five years imprisonment and released on parole in 2011 before returning to Sweden.

== Background ==
Sabina Eriksson and her identical twin sister Ursula Eriksson were born in Sweden on 3 November 1967 and grew up in Sunne, Värmland, with an older sister and an older brother. In their youth, they had no apparent history of mental health issues or criminal convictions, and by 2000, Ursula was living in the United States while Sabina was living in Mallow, County Cork, Ireland, with her spouse and two children.

Ursula visited Sabina on Friday, 16 May 2008. For unclear reasons, the sisters secretly departed Sabina's home for Liverpool, England. Probably travelling by ferry, they arrived in Liverpool at 8:30 am on Saturday, and went to St Anne Street Police Station, apparently to report concerns over the safety of Sabina's children. Liverpool Police contacted Dublin to follow up on the request, learning that Sabina had fought with her partner the previous night. At around 11:30 am that morning, the pair then boarded a National Express coach headed to London.

== Incidents ==
=== Coach journey ===
A police report stated that the sisters suddenly disembarked from the coach at Keele services, a motorway service station, as they were not feeling well. The driver of the bus, however, said he left them at Keele services, although it was not a scheduled rest stop, at around 1:00 pm after becoming suspicious of their erratic behaviour. He noticed the twins clinging to their bags tightly and did not let them re-board because they refused to let him search their bags for illegal items.

The manager of the service station was informed, and also, feeling suspicious of the pair's demeanour, movements, and fixation on their bags, she called the police. Officers arrived to talk to them but left after saying the women seemed harmless.

=== Running onto the motorway ===
As seen on closed-circuit television cameras, the pair departed the services on foot and began to walk down the central reservation of the M6 before attempting to cross it, causing chaos to the traffic and picking up minor injuries in the attempt – Sabina having been struck by a SEAT León. Their older brother claimed in a Swedish newspaper that his sisters were fleeing from maniacs who were chasing them, although there is nothing to support this. Highways Agency officers responded to the incident, and police from the Central Motorway Police Group were called to assist. The police were accompanied by a small television crew who happened to be filming Motorway Cops with the officers.

Standing on the north direction hard shoulder of the motorway, the police were being apprised of the situation when, without warning, Ursula broke free and ran into the side of an oncoming Mercedes-Benz Actros 2546 articulated lorry travelling at around 56 mph (90 km/h). Sabina then quickly followed her into the road and was hit head-on by a Volkswagen Polo travelling at high speed.

Both survived. Ursula was immobilised as the lorry had crushed her legs, and Sabina spent fifteen minutes unconscious. The pair were treated by paramedics; however, Ursula resisted medical aid by spitting, scratching, and screaming. Ursula told the police officers restraining her, "I recognise you – I know you're not real", and Sabina, now conscious, shouted "They're going to steal your organs". To the surprise of the police, Sabina got to her feet, despite attempts from police officers Tracy Cope and Paul Finlayson to persuade her to stay on the ground.

Sabina started screaming for help and calling for the police although they were present, then struck Officer Cope's face before running into traffic on the other side of the motorway. Emergency workers and several members of the public caught up with her and restrained her, and carried her to a waiting ambulance, at which point she was handcuffed and sedated. Given the similarities in their behaviours, a suicide pact or drug use was quickly suspected.

Ursula was taken to the hospital by air ambulance. Sabina was taken to the hospital where, despite her ordeal and an apparent lack of concern over her sister's injuries, she soon became calmer and was released five hours later.

In police custody, she remained relaxed, and while being processed, she told an officer, "We say in Sweden that an accident rarely comes alone. Usually, at least one more follows – maybe two." On 19 May 2008, Sabina was released from court without a full psychiatric evaluation, having pleaded guilty to the charges of trespass on the motorway and hitting a police officer. The court sentenced her to one day in custody, which she had been deemed to have served, having spent a full night in police custody.

=== Killing of Glenn Hollinshead ===
Leaving court, Sabina began to wander the streets of Stoke-on-Trent, trying to locate her sister in the hospital and carrying her possessions in a clear plastic bag the police had given her. She wore her sister's green top. At 7:00 pm, two local men spotted Sabina while walking their dog on Christchurch Street, Fenton. One of the men was 54-year-old Glenn Hollinshead, a self-employed welder, qualified paramedic, and former RAF airman, and the other was his friend, Peter Molloy. Sabina appeared friendly and stroked the dog as the three struck up a conversation. Although friendly, Sabina appeared to be behaving nervously, which worried Molloy. Sabina asked the two men for directions to any nearby bed and breakfasts or hotels.

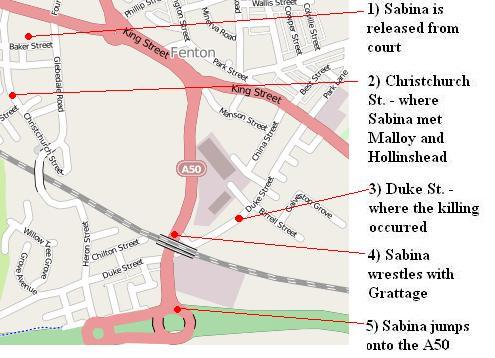
Sabina's course of action in Fenton.

Hollinshead took pity on her and offered to take her back to his house on Duke Street. Sabina accepted and relaxed as she began to relate how she was trying to locate her hospitalised sister. Back at the house, over drinks, her odd behaviour continued as she constantly got up and looked out of the window, leading Molloy to assume that she had run away from an abusive partner.

She appeared paranoid too, offering the men cigarettes, only to quickly snatch them out of their mouths, claiming they may be poisoned. Shortly before midnight, Molloy left, and Sabina stayed the night.

The next day around midday, Hollinshead called his brother regarding local hospitals to locate Sabina's sister Ursula. At 7:40 pm, while a meal was being prepared, Hollinshead left the house to ask a neighbour for tea bags, then went back inside. One minute later, he staggered back outside, now bleeding, and told him "She stabbed me", before collapsing to the ground and quickly dying from his injuries. His last words before he died, allegedly, were, "Look after my dog for me."

As the neighbour dialled 999, Sabina fled the premises, and was caught on the run by nearby CCTV. She ran out of the house with a hammer, periodically hitting herself over the head with it. A passing motorist, Joshua Grattage, saw this and decided to tackle her to take control of the hammer.

While wrestling with him, Sabina screamed, took a roof tile out of her pocket, and struck him on the back of the head with it, stunning him temporarily. By this time, paramedics had found her, and they gave chase. The pursuit ended at Heron Cross when Sabina jumped from a 12-metre (40 ft) high bridge onto the A50. Breaking both ankles and fracturing her skull in the fall, she was taken to the hospital.

== Trial ==
On 6 June 2008, Sabina was arrested while recovering at University Hospital of North Staffordshire, and was discharged in a wheelchair on 11 September 2008, at which point she was taken into custody and charged with murder the same day. Ursula was also released from hospital in September, and relocated uneventfully back to Sweden, and then the US. Sabina’s trial was scheduled for February 2009, but was adjourned after the court encountered difficulties in obtaining her medical records from Sweden. The trial was then scheduled to start on 1 September 2009.

Sabina pleaded guilty to manslaughter with diminished responsibility on 2 September 2009, having stabbed her victim five times with a kitchen knife. At no point during her interrogation or the trial did she explain her actions, only replying "no comment" to extensive police questioning. Similarly, at no time was the video from the M6 used as evidence in the court.

Both the prosecution and the defence claimed that Sabina was insane at the time of the killing. However, she had become sane again by the time of her trial. The defence counsel in the trial claimed that Eriksson was a "secondary" sufferer of folie à deux, influenced by the presence or perceived presence of her twin sister, the "primary" sufferer. The court also heard that she had suffered from a rare psychiatric disorder which made her hear voices, but she could not interpret what they said, as well as an alternative theory that she had suffered from acute polymorphic delusional disorder. Her plea was accepted by the prosecution at Nottingham Crown Court on 2 September 2010. Mr Justice Saunders concluded that Sabina had a "low" level of culpability for her actions:

I understand that this sentence will seem entirely inadequate to the relatives of the deceased. However, I have sentenced on the basis that the reason for the killing was the mental illness and therefore the culpability of the defendant is low and therefore the sentence I have passed is designed to protect the public. It is not designed to reflect the grief the relatives have suffered or to measure the value of Mr Hollinshead's life. No sentence that I could pass could do that. It is a sentence which I hope fairly measures a truly tragic event. [Sabina was] suffering from delusions, which she believed to be true, and they dictated her behaviour. It is not one of those cases where the defendant could have done something to avoid the onset.

Sabina was sentenced to five years in prison. She was sent to Bronzefield Women's Prison, where she turned to Christianity. Having already spent 439 days in custody before sentencing, this left her first eligible for release in 2011.

== Aftermath ==
Many questions were left unanswered. Some called for an investigation into the way the criminal justice system handled the matter, including Peter Molloy and MP for Stoke South Rob Flello. Glenn Hollinshead's brother Garry was critical of the justice system which he viewed as enabling the killing, stating:

"We don't hold her responsible, the same as we wouldn't blame a rabid dog for biting someone. She is ill and to a large degree, not responsible for her actions. But her mental disorder should have been recognised much earlier." "I do question the criminal justice system for allowing somebody like this to be let out when she is capable of committing such a crime. Her mental condition should have been properly assessed after what she did on the motorway and the experiences the police had. Her mental disorder should have been picked up prior to her being let out in to the community... [Glenn] saw Eriksson in distress and was just trying to help. He wasn't slow in coming forward to help somebody in distress. It was in his nature. He was trying to help. He would help anybody. If he saw a fight in the street and a guy was losing he would help."

In 2012, a section edited from the Motorway Cops episode was uploaded to YouTube. It shows police officers at the roadside after Ursula had been run over, discussing detaining and assessing Sabina on mental health grounds - which might have prevented Hollinshead's killing - but this was not done.

== Media ==
- 2010 – Madness in the Fast Lane is a BBC documentary, first broadcast on BBC One on 10 August. The footage on the M6 motorway of the two women jumping into the passing traffic had previously been broadcast on Motorway Cops, but this was the first time the rest of the story had been told.
- 2012 – A Madness Shared By Two, David Cann ISBN 0956848915
- 2016 – "Case 17 - The Eriksson Twins," Casefile True Crime Podcast
- 2017 – "58 - Some Quiet Sunday," My Favorite Murder podcast
- 2019 – "The Eriksson Twins," Mr. Bunker's Conspiracy Time Podcast
- 2019 – "Episode 46 - Two Tales of Twisted Sisters," Creep Street podcast
- 2019 – "Episode 22 - The Eriksson Twins," Cult Liter podcast
- 2020 – "Episode 13: Tangents & True Crime - The Eriksson Twins,” Ladies & Tangents Apple Podcast
- 2020 – "Episode 433: The Murderous Madness of the Twins Eriksson," The Last Podcast on the Left
- 2021 – Season 5, Episode 43 - They Walk Among Us Podcast
- 2021 – Episode 94 - Scared to Death Podcast
- 2021 – Season 5, Episode 20 - "The Madness of Twins", Seeing Red Podcast
- 2021 – "Season 2, Episode 11 - The Story of the Eriksson Twins", Truth Be Told Podcast
- 2021 – Episode 108 - "Venom, Theatres, Parsi Food, Shared Psychosis", The Internet Said So
- 2022 - Episode 1 - "Ursula & Sabina Eriksson", Things Are About To Get Weird podcast
- 2024 - Episode 181 - "Ursula and Sabina Eriksson", Women and Crime Podcast
- 2025 - "Ursula and Sabina Eriksson", Necronomipod podcast
- 2025 – Twisted Sisters: Madness & Manslaughter, a two-part Channel 5 documentary
- 2026 - Madness on the Motorway. Fascinating Horror. 13 January 2026 – via YouTube.

== See also ==
- Bouffée délirante
- Folie à deux
