= Police Interceptors =

British television series

- Created by: Steve Warr; Bill Rudgard
- Developed by: Raw Cut
- Narrated by: Christopher Fox (2008–2015); John Thomson (2015–)
- Country of origin: United Kingdom
- Original language: English
- No. of series: 24
- No. of episodes: 282 (list of episodes)

Production
- Executive producers: Steve Warr; Bill Rudgard
- Producer: John Everett
- Running time: 55–60 minutes (inc. adverts)

Original release
- Network: Channel 5
- Release: 9 May 2008 – present

Related
- Road Wars; Street Wars

Police Interceptors is a British factual programme that profiles the work of elite police units from across England. There have to date been 24 series, following police units from Essex, South Yorkshire, Derbyshire, Cumbria, Lincolnshire, Durham and Cleveland, Cheshire, West Yorkshire, Nottinghamshire and Northamptonshire.

The documentary has been broadcast by Channel 5 since the first episode on 9 May 2008. The show is produced by the same producers of the former Sky One series Road Wars.

== History ==
The first three series follow a police ANPR Intercept Team (now known as the Territorial Support Team) in Essex. Series 1 began on 9 May 2008 on Channel 5 (as Five) and ran for six weeks with an additional compilation episode. Series 2 began at 8pm on 10 October 2008 on Channel 5 and ran for twelve weeks with two additional compilation episodes. Series 3 began on 7 June 2010 on Five for 15 episodes.

The fourth series began on 13 June 2011 on Channel 5 and rode with South Yorkshire Police's Road Crime Unit for 8 weeks and returned in January 2012, this time following Derbyshire Police's Road Policing Unit. Series 5, consisting of 10 episodes, began on 28 January 2013 and followed the Cumbria Constabulary's Roads Policing Unit. Series 6, 7 and 8 all consist of 10 episodes and followed the work of Lincolnshire Police's Road Policing, and Special Operations Units.

Series 9, 10 and 11 are based around the work of the collaborative Durham Constabulary and Cleveland Police's Specialist Operations Units.

Series 12 follows the work of the Cheshire Police Roads Policing Unit. Series 13 & 14 saw the Durham and Cleveland Special Operations Unit return as hosts in September 2017. Series 14 again follows the Durham Constabulary and Cleveland Police's Specialist Operations Units and began broadcasting on Channel 5 on 30 April 2018.

Police Interceptors returned for its fifteenth, sixteenth and seventeenth series in late 2018, March 2019 and October 2019 respectively, this time following a new police force, West Yorkshire Police's Roads Policing Unit (RPU), as well as other Specialist Operations Units. Series 18 returned to observe the work of West Yorkshire Police RPUs

== Interceptor team ==
The series features the following police officers from across the UK involved in high-speed car chases following car thieves in stolen vehicles, speeding and drunken drivers. For example, in season 12 of Police Interceptors, the Cheshire police force was showcased, with many police officers included (examples of police officers include Sgt Sean Doolan and PC James Hunt). They use the latest high-speed police cars to follow and hunt down boy racers presenting a danger to the public. The Interceptors also use the latest number-plate reading technology (ANPR) to detect drivers without car insurance, often resulting in an argument with the driver and the disclosure of other crimes. The chases are often interspersed with light-hearted incidents involving the team's food breaks, harmless drunks and practical jokes in the incident room. The show often identifies officers by humorous nicknames and on-screen graphics feature data on their years in service, likes and dislikes. Most incidents are tracked down by uniform officers from the Interceptor team but plain clothes and undercover police have also featured in the series.

== Episodes ==
Series	No. of episodes		Policing unit	Original air date	Ref.
1	7		ANPR Intercept Team in Essex.	9 May 2008 – 20 June 2008	
2	14		ANPR Intercept Team in Essex.	10 October 2008 – 20 March 2009	
3	15		ANPR Intercept Team in Essex.	7 June 2010 – 17 September 2010	
4	18	8 10	South Yorkshire specialist pursuit unit Derbyshire policing unit	3 June 2011 – 1 August 2011 16 January 2012 – 9 July 2012	
5	10		Cumbria Constabulary road policing unit	28 January 2013 – 30 September 2013	
6	10		Lincolnshire's Road Policing and Special Operations	27 January 2014 – 31 March 2014	
7	10		Lincolnshire's Road Policing and Special Operations	7 July 2014 – 11 September 2014	
8	10		Lincolnshire's Road Policing and Special Operations	9 February 2015 – 20 April 2015	
9	11		Durham Constabulary high-speed intercept team, Cleveland Specialist Operations	14 September 2015 – 28 November 2015	
10	12		Durham Constabulary high-speed intercept team, Cleveland Specialist Operations	14 March 2016 – 30 May 2016	
11	12		Durham Constabulary high-speed intercept team, Cleveland Specialist Operations	5 September 2016 – 6 February 2017	
12	12		Cheshire Police Roads Policing Unit.	20 March 2017 – 19 June 2017	
13	12		Durham Constabulary high-speed intercept team, Cleveland Specialist Operations	11 September 2017 – 28 November 2017	
14	13		Durham Constabulary high-speed intercept team, Cleveland Specialist Operations	30 April 2018 – 22 July 2018	
15	10		West Yorkshire Police Roads Policing Unit	5 November 2018 – 21 January 2019	
16	15		West Yorkshire Police Roads Policing Unit	11 March 2019 – 24 June 2019	
17	15		West Yorkshire Police Roads Policing Unit	16 October 2019 – 11 May 2020	
18	16		West Yorkshire Police Roads Policing Unit	12 October 2020 – 8 February 2021	
19	15		Nottinghamshire Police Roads Policing Unit	10 March 2021 – 13 September 2021	
20	15		Nottinghamshire Police Roads Policing Unit	10 November 2021 – 25 May 2022	
21	10		Nottinghamshire Police Roads Policing Unit	22 June 2022 – 21 September 2022	
22	19		Nottinghamshire Police Roads Policing Unit	15 May 2023 – 18 September 2023	
23	16		Northamptonshire Police & Nottinghamshire Police	2 September 2024 – 16 December 2024	
24	14		Northamptonshire Police	29 September 2025 – 5 January 2026	
25	TBC		Northamptonshire Police	12 January 2026 – present	

== Ultimate Police Interceptors ==
On 8 August 2011, a new show started entitled Ultimate Police Interceptors, a compilation of the best bits from episodes of the previous series.

Series 1

#	Synopsis	Original air date
1	The new recruits are put to the test by a burglary.	8 August 2011
2	A runaway driver leads the interceptors on a lengthy pursuit.	22 August 2011
3	The interceptors deal with a knife-wielding man in Essex	30 September 2011
4	The interceptors weed out a drug dealer.	7 October 2011
5	The team contends with a street-fighting man.	14 October 2011

Series 2

#	Synopsis	Original air date
1	Highlights of the road-crime documentary series.	12 March 2012
2	Highlights of the road-crime documentary series.	19 March 2012
3	Highlights of the road-crime documentary series.	2 April 2012
4	Highlights of the road-crime documentary series.	9 April 2012

Series 3

#	Synopsis	Original air date
1	The specialist pursuit team arrest a man for domestic violence but he refuses to accept the situation he has found himself in, while Jon Peacock is kept on his toes by a nimble criminal. Elsewhere, a raid has an unexpected outcome when officers head to a suspected drug dealer's home.	15 September 2014
2	A routine drugs raid brings officers from Lincolnshire Police's specialist team face to face with an armed suspect, and some rogue traders get a taste of their own medicine. Plus, a drink-driver receives an unwelcome home visit.	22 September 2014
3	Highlights of the road-crime documentary series.	27 September 2014
4	Highlights of the road-crime documentary series.	6 October 2014
5	Highlights of the road-crime documentary series.	13 October 2014
6	Highlights of the road-crime documentary series.	20 October 2014

Series 4

#	Synopsis	Original air date
1	Highlights of the road-crime documentary series.	5 June 2015
2	Highlights of the road-crime documentary series.	12 June 2015
3	Highlights of the road-crime documentary series.	19 June 2015
4	Highlights of the road-crime documentary series.	26 June 2015

== Compilation shows ==
The Essex series included Best of Police Interceptors showing highlights of the chases and incidents from the previous programmes. At the end of series 4, Ultimate Police Interceptors contained highlights from previous shows with updates on the fate of the criminals since the series' first airing.

=== Police Interceptors: Special Edition ===
A spin-off to series 2, Police Interceptors: Special Edition, was presented by Natalie Pinkham and Chris Barnes on Fiver (now 5Star) in 2011. This was a follow-up show to the main edition featuring highlights from the chases, interviews with members of the Essex team and the presenters participating in "hands-on" reconstructions and police training exercises. Presenters also took part in incident simulations, like driving a car while a stinger is deployed to puncture the car's tyres.

== See also ==
- Road Wars – series broadcast on Sky1, Sky2 and Pick TV with a similar format and made by the same producers.
- Street Wars – programme broadcast on Sky1, Sky2 and Pick TV which is about police officers "on the beat".
- Brit Cops – similar police show on Sky Livingit (originally on Bravo).
- Traffic Cops – series about traffic police broadcast on Channel 5 and formerly on BBC One.
- Sky Cops – BBC series featuring helicopter police.
- Police Camera Action! – show broadcast on ITV.
- Night Cops – show broadcast on Sky1, Sky2 and Pick.
