= North West Motorway Police Group =

English police service

Logo of the NWMPG

The North West Motorway Police Group (NWMPG) was a collaboration that provided a regionalised policing service for the motorways within the Cheshire, Merseyside and Greater Manchester Police areas. It was established in June 2008 in partnership with the Highways Agency, and was modelled on the Central Motorway Police Group, which has operated in the Midlands since 1990.

Operating from bases across the three police areas, NWMPG was made up of over 130 police officers and more than 30 support staff from the three forces. The group was responsible for patrolling a motorway network stretching from the borders with Lancashire in the north to West Mercia and Staffordshire to the south, as well as North Wales to the west and West Yorkshire to the east.

Lancashire Police were involved in the NWMPG but withdrew in April 2018.

The 24-hour Regional Command and Control Centre, was located at National Highways Regional Operational Control Centre at Newton-le-Willows, and was used to maintain contact with all police and National Highways staff deployed by their respective organisations.

The collaboration was disbanded on 1 April 2025, with policing of the strategic road network passed back to the respective area police forces.

National Highways continue to operate their North West Regional Control Centre from the Newton-le-Willows building.

== See also ==
- Roads Policing Unit
