= Lee Boardman =

English actor (born 1972)

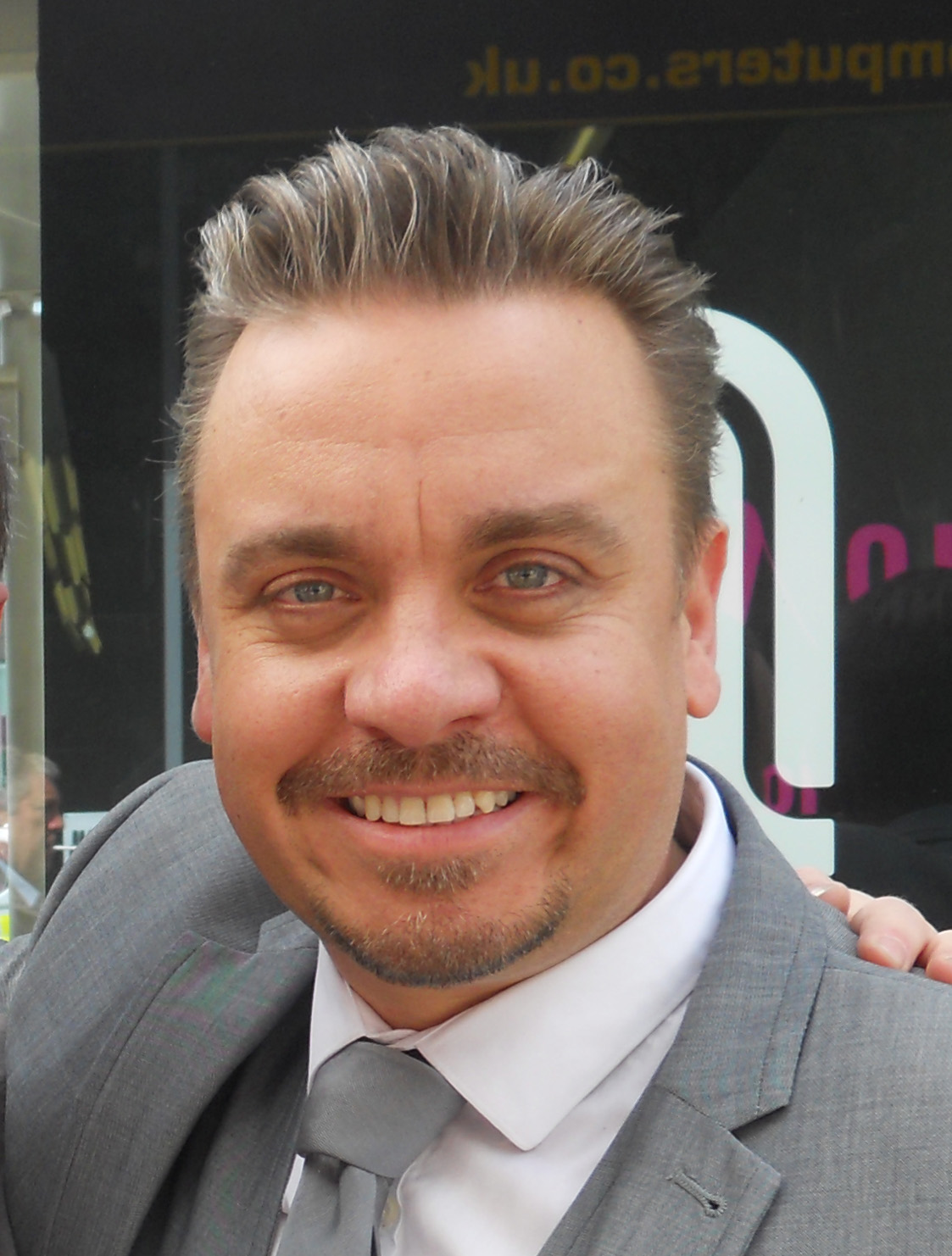
- Boardman in November 2012
- Born: 2 July 1972 (age 54); Stockport, Cheshire, England
- Occupations: Actor; narrator
- Years active: 1996–present
- Spouse: Jennifer James (m. 2001)
- Children: 2

Lee Boardman (born 2 July 1972) is an English actor and narrator. He has appeared in the films Love's Kitchen (2011) and Jack the Giant Slayer (2013), and the television series Rome (2005–2007).

== Career ==
Boardman played Murray Priestman in Drop Dead Gorgeous as well as the drug dealer Jez Quigley in Coronation Street. He appears as Timon the Jew in the television series Rome. He also made an appearance in the fifth episode of the 2011 BBC crime-drama series Death in Paradise. In 2013 he starred in the ITV1 comedy drama series Great Night Out as Hodge. In 2014 he played the recurring character of Amerigo Vespucci in Da Vinci's Demons.

In 2006, Lee starred in the film Fated.

He was also the narrator of popular Sky 1 police documentary Road Wars and its spin off Street Wars.

His BBC series Drop Dead Gorgeous won Best Comedy Drama at the British Comedy Awards 2008.

== Personal life ==
Born in Stockport, Cheshire, England, in 1972, Boardman studied at Stockport College prior to winning a scholarship to the Oxford School of Drama. In 2001 he married his former Coronation Street co-star Jennifer James. They have two children; a son born in 2004 and a daughter born 2010.

== Actor Tribe ==
In 2013, Boardman and James launched Actor Tribe, an acting school for children and adults in Knutsford. The courses focus on the complexities of being a working actor through guest tutors who are professional actors themselves. Due to the success of the programme, an additional school in Heaton Mersey was opened in 2016, with Boardman and his wife, Jennifer, dividing their time between the two locations.

== Filmography ==
=== Television ===
Year	Title	Character	Production	Notes
1997	Gold	Tomkins	ITV	Appeared in: Season 3, Ep. 3, 4 "The Catch (Two Parts)"
1997–2000	Coronation Street	Jez Quigley	ITV	Appeared in: Ep. 1.4207, 1.4730, 1.4739, 1.4745, 1.4746, 1.4747, 1.4751, 1.4886, 1.4888, 1.4890, 1.4892
1998	Grafters	Andy	TVBBC	Appeared in: Season 1 Ep. 5, 6
1999–2001	The Bill	Dave Carter/Waiter		Appeared in: Season 15, Ep. 41; Season 17, Ep. 40
2000–2003	Hotel Getaway	Standup Comic, Murder Mystery Actor, Promo Video Director	ITV	Appeared in: Season 1, Ep. 3; Season 2, Ep. 4, 5
2003-2009	Road Wars	Narrator	Broadcast on Sky 1	
2003	Holby City	Peter Gaskell	BBC	Appeared in: Series 5, Ep. 24
2004	Dalziel and Pascoe	Sgt. Brian Skinner	BBC	Appeared in: Season 8, Ep. 1 "A Game of Soldiers"
2004	Making Waves	Leading Chef	ITV	Appeared in: Series 1, Ep. 1
2005	Street Wars	Narrator	Broadcast on Sky 1	
2005–2007	Rome	Timon	BBC/HBO	Appeared in: Season 1, Ep. 1, 3, 6, 9, 11; Season 2 (All)
2006	Longford	Talk Show Host	HBO	Made for TV Movie
2006–2007	Drop Dead Gorgeous	Murray Priestman	BBC	Appeared in: Series 1, Ep. 1–4; Series 2, Ep. 1–4, 6
2009	Krod Mandoon and the Flaming Sword of Fire	Stygian Assassin	Comedy Central	Appeared in Season 1, Ep. 1-2
2009	Moving On	Colin	BBC	Appeared in: Series 1, Ep. 2
2009	The Street	Bomber	BBC	Appeared in: Series, Ep. 6
2009	Blue Murder	Donnie Shoreham	ITV	Appeared in: Series 5, Ep. 2
2010	Ladies of Letters	Damon	ITV	Appeared in: Series 2, Ep. 1-7
2011	Midsomer Murders	Matt Rowntree	ITV	Appeared in: Series 14, Ep. 3
2011	Trollied	Craig Fallon	Sky One	Appeared in: Series 1, Ep. 6
2011	Death in Paradise	Samuel King	BBC	Appeared in: Series 1, Ep. 5
2011	Little Crackers	Reg	Sky One	Appeared in: Series 2, Ep. 9
2012	Secrets and Words	Jimmy	BBC	Appeared in: Series 1, Ep. 4
2013	Great Night Out	Paddy "Hodge" Hodgkinson	ITV	Series 1
2013	Playhouse Presents	Lenny	Sky Arts	Appeared in: Series 2, Ep. 1 "Hey Diddly Dee"
2014	Inspector George Gently	Todd Stretch	BBC	Appeared in: Series 6, Ep. 2
2014	Da Vinci's Demons	Amerigo Vespucci	Starz	Appeared in: Season 2, Ep. 2–5, 9
2015	Sun Trap	Elton Juan	BBC	Appeared in: Season 1, Ep. 5
2015	The Interceptor	Xavier	BBC	Appeared in: Series 1
2016	Beowulf: Return to the Shieldlands	Hane	ITV	Appeared in: Season 1, Ep. 6-12
2016	Boomers	Matt	BBC	Appeared in: Series 2, Ep. 2 "Matt & Seb"
2016	The Five	Jay Newman	Sky 1	Appeared in: Season 1, Ep. 2, 3, 7, 8, 10
2017	In the Dark	Kevin Sherwood	BBC	Appeared in: Series 1, Ep. 4
2017	Bancroft	George Morris	ITV	Appeared in: Series 1, Ep. 1–4
2018	The Last Kingdom	Guthlac	BBC America/Netflix	Appeared in: Season 3, Ep.7
2019	Brexit: The Uncivil War	Arron Banks	Channel 4/HBO	
2019–2020	Absentia	Holt Thompson		
2020	The Trouble with Maggie Cole	Brian Daniels	ITV	Series 1
2022	Andor	Kravas Drezzer	Disney+	Appeared in: Ep.1
TBA	The Crow Girl	David White	Paramount+	Filming

=== Film ===
Year	Title	Character	Notes
2000	P.O.V.	Shaun	
2002	Sleep My Love	Tramp	Short Film
2006	Fated	Jack	
2010	London Boulevard	Lee	
2010	The Story of F***	Gilford Bell	
2011	Leila	Paul	
2011	Love's Kitchen	Loz	
2011	Being Sold	Chris Hope	
2013	Jack the Giant Slayer	Badger	
2015	Monochrome	Agent Walcott	Independent Film
2016	The Young Messiah	Roman Squad Leader	
2017	Tremor Cordis	Ricky	Short Film
2017	Mum	Carl	Independent Short Film
2018	Peterloo	Nadin's Constable	Directed by Mike Leigh
2019	The Runaways	Blythe	In Post Production
2022	Memory	Mauricio	
2022	Enola Holmes 2	Mr. Bill Crouch	
2025	Cleaner	Gerald Milton	

=== Video games ===
Year	Title	Character	Notes
2011	The Witcher 2: Assassins of Kings	Additional Voices	
2011	Warhammer 40,000: Space Marine	Alexander/Imperial Guardsman	
2012	Assassin's Creed III	Additional Voices	
2013	Assassin's Creed IV: Black Flag	Additional Voices	
2014	Assassin's Creed: Unity	Additional Voices	
2014	Assassin's Creed: Rogue	Additional Voices	
2015	The Witcher 3: Wild Hunt - Hearts of Stone	Vlodimir von Everec	English Version
2017	Assassin's Creed: Origins	Voice Talent	
