= Sky Crime =

British pay television channel

- Logo used since 2026

- Alternate Logo for UI/EPG, digital and small format spaces.

Programming
- Picture format: 1080i HDTV (downscaled to 16:9 576i for the SDTV feed.)
- Timeshift service: Sky Crime +1

Ownership
- Owner: Sky Group (Comcast)
- Sister channels: List of Sky UK channels

History
- Launched: 1 October 2019; 6 years ago
- Replaced: Real Lives

Links
- Website: www.sky.com/watch/channel/sky-crime

Availability

Terrestrial
- BT: Channel 349; Channel 364 (HD)

Streaming media
- Sky Go: Watch live (UK and Ireland only)
- Now: Watch live (UK and Ireland only)
- Virgin TV Go: Watch live (UK only); Watch live (+1) (UK only)
- Virgin TV Anywhere: Watch live (Ireland only)

HD logo used from 2020 to 2026

Timeshift logo used from 2020 to 2026

Sky Crime is a British pay television channel owned and operated by Sky, a division of Comcast. The channel launched on 1 October 2019, replacing Real Lives. Sky Crime broadcasts crime dramas from Oxygen, HBO, Jupiter Entertainment and Woodcut Media.

== Broadcasting ==
=== Satellite ===
- Sky UK:
  - Channel 122 (HD)
  - Channel 222 (+1)
  - Channel 820 (SD)

=== Cable ===
- Virgin Media:
  - Channel 121 (HD)
  - Channel 321 (+1)

== Programming ==
Sky Crime broadcasts:

- Atlanta's Missing & Murdered: The Lost Children
- Border Security: Canada's Front Line
- Brit Cops
- Caught on Dashcam
- The Disappearance of Susan Cox Powell
- Highway Patrol
- How I Caught The Killer
- I Love You, Now Die
- In Defense Of
- Kemper on Kemper
- The Killer in My Family
- Most Evil Killers
- Motorway Patrol
- Murder in the Valleys
- Murders That Shocked the Nation
- Nothing to Declare
- The Real Manhunter
- Road Wars
- Snapped
- Stop, Search, Seize
- A Wedding and a Murder

== See also ==
- Sky Krimi, a long-running crime-themed German television channel also operated by Sky plc as a part of its Germany and Austria portfolio. Sky Deutschland also broadcasts a channel of its own called Sky Crime.
