= Jolyon James =

Australian-born actor, writer and artist

- Born: Western Australia
- Occupations: Singer, actor, Director

Jolyon James is an Australian-born actor, writer and visual artist who creates work predominantly for young people. In 2018 he wrote directed and designed the Helpmann Award winning 'Robot Song' for Arena Theatre Company, the premiere work produced by the company after its relocation to regional Victoria. Other recent works by Jolyon include Trapper and A Cautionary Tales for Children starring Virginia Gay. As a visual artist Jolyon has exhibited regularly in Victoria and was a finalist in the National Photographic Portrait Prize in 2012. He performed the role of the Moonshadow in Cat Stevens's musical of the same name which is played in Melbourne’s Princess Theatre for 12 weeks from 31 May 2012.

== Early life ==
James was born in Western Australia in a remote country town. He studied at the Western Australian Academy of Performing Arts (WAAPA), graduating in 1997. He performed the role of Jean Prouvaire, and understudied and performed the role of Enjolras in the 1999 Australian tour of Les Misérables and appeared on numerous Australian TV shows before moving to the UK in 2002 to broaden his horizons.

== Acting career ==
After graduating from WAAPA, James guest starred in Australian television shows Water Rats, Blue Heelers and The Secret Life of Us, as well as a role in the TV movie Never Tell Me Never. James secured the major role of Police Officer Con Stavros in the 2000 TV series Above the Law. In 2001 James starred as Sky in the Melbourne run of Mamma Mia! James directed the play This is Our Youth in Melbourne in 2002 and Perth in January 2003. After moving to London, James played a supporting role in the UK TV series Mad About Alice, and in 2005 appeared briefly in the Hollywood film The Wedding Date, playing Debra Messing's character's ex-boyfriend "Woody".

Back in Australia, James appeared on TV screens again in shows such as Headland, City Homicide, Rush and Offspring, as well as playing Schuurman in the 2008 TV movie Krakatoa. He is a Director and member of the creative team behind Doorstep Ensemble, a theatre company which seeks to give up and coming community theatre performers a foot in the door to the professional industry, and he has both appeared in and directed a number of their productions. In 2011 James was both a tutor and mentor with Showfit, a 12-month course focused on developing performers’ skills and confidence and eventually showcasing them to industry professionals.

In 2012 James appeared in the title role of Moonshadow, a musical by Cat Stevens which premiered in Melbourne at the Princess Theatre, and performed the role of Indian John in Eddie Perfect's Shane Warne the Musical the following year.

James has been in two Stephen Sondheim musicals. He first appeared in the 1998 Melbourne cast of Into the Woods as Rapunzel's Prince, and then in the 2014 Melbourne cast of Passion as Major Rizzolli.

== Photography ==
James is also a photographic artist and is involved in a long-term collaboration with Raphael Ruz entitled BILLIEJEANISNOTMYLOVER. They are based in Melbourne. James also creates animation and video content for theatre productions and music video clips including the single "Magnet" by Kate Ceberano. He is a writer, director and producer and is currently the Artistic Associate for the Arena Theatre Company.
