= Steve Warr =

British television director and producer

Steve Warr is a British television director and producer. He is currently a company director of Raw Cut TV.

In the 1990s, Warr was the first producer to combine police video with observational documentary in the BBC docusoap X-Cars. He was the executive producer and series producer of ITV's Police Camera Action!. He produced Roger Cook’s current affairs series The Cook Report for four years at Central Television. He has also directed ITV's Tonight with Trevor McDonald. More recently, Warr created and produced Road Wars and Street Wars for Sky1, Police Interceptors for Channel 5, "Neighbourhood Blues "for BBC1 and a number of single documentaries for TV in the UK and America.
