= Elizabeth Young (author) =

American chick lit writer

Elizabeth Young is a Chick lit and contemporary romance writer.

Her novel Asking for Trouble was the basis for the 2005 film The Wedding Date. It was directed by Clare Kilner, starring Debra Messing and Dermot Mulroney, with supporting roles by Amy Adams and Holland Taylor.

== Bibliography ==
Sorted by publishing house and release date :

=== With Arrow Books ===
Fair Game, January 2001, ISBN 0099463350

=== With HarperCollins ===
- Asking For Trouble, September 2002, ISBN 0380818973
- A Promising Man (and About Time Too), November 2002, ISBN 0060507845

=== With Avon ===
- A Girl's Best Friend, August 2003, ISBN 0060562773
- Making Mischief, October 2005, ISBN 0060784784

== See also ==
- The Wedding Date, 2005 movie based on the novel Asking for Trouble.
