= The Wedding Date =

2005 romantic comedy directed by Clare Kilner

- Theatrical release poster
- Directed by: Clare Kilner
- Written by: Dana Fox
- Based on: Asking for Trouble by Elizabeth Young
- Produced by: Jessica Bendinger; Paul Brooks; Michelle Chydzik; Nathalie Marciano
- Starring: Debra Messing; Dermot Mulroney; Amy Adams; Peter Egan; Holland Taylor
- Cinematography: Oliver Curtis
- Edited by: Mary Finlay
- Music by: Blake Neely
- Production company: Gold Circle Films
- Distributed by: Universal Pictures; (United States, Latin America and South Korea); Senator International; (International)
- Release date: February 4, 2005 (United States)
- Running time: 90 minutes
- Country: United States
- Language: English
- Budget: $15 million
- Box office: $47.2 million

The Wedding Date is a 2005 American romantic comedy film directed by Clare Kilner and starring Debra Messing, Dermot Mulroney, and Amy Adams. Based on the 2002 novel Asking for Trouble by Elizabeth Young, the film is about a single woman who hires a male escort to pose as her boyfriend at her sister's wedding in order to dupe her ex-fiancé, who dumped her a few years prior. The film was released on February 4, 2005, and grossed $47 million.

== Plot ==
Kat Ellis is a single New Yorker who returns to her parents' house in London to be the maid of honor at her younger half-sister Amy's wedding. The best man is her former fiancé, who unexpectedly dumped her two years ago. Anxious about confronting and eager to impress him, she hires suave escort Nick Mercer to pose as her boyfriend.

Kat intends to make her former flame, Jeffrey, jealous, but her plan backfires when Nick convinces everyone, including her, that they are madly in love. Kat then feels herself, too, falling for Nick as he slowly falls for her.

The night before the wedding, Kat discovers Amy slept with Jeffrey when they were still together, and he dumped her because he believed he was in love with Amy. Nick had discovered this a day earlier, and when Kat finds that out, she feels betrayed from all sides, and puts Nick off. He decides to return to America, and leaves Kat the money she had paid him.

On the wedding day, seeing Kat distressed, her step-father asks her if Nick 'is the guy for you'. Kat realizes he is, so she sets off to find him. Meanwhile, just before the wedding ceremony, Amy confesses her betrayal to her fiancé, Ed, but professes her love for him.

Upset, Ed chases Jeffrey out of the church and down the road. Jeffrey insists he gave up on Amy and believes he's done nothing wrong. To which Ed calls him a "back-stabbing weasel", though Jeffrey believes he's still not in the wrong as he slept with Amy before she and Ed dated. Ed shouts out that Jeffrey was engaged to Kat, proving he was still in the wrong for what he did to Kat.

Nick picks up Ed in a car as Jeffrey disappears into the woods. They talk about love, and Ed decides he loves Amy more than he is angry. To make it clearer he should go back, Nick tells Ed if he returned, the couple would end up having great makeup sex. They return to the church, with Nick as the 'new' best man. Just before the ceremony, Nick tells Kat he realized he'd "... rather fight with you than make love with anyone else", and they kiss passionately.

Kat and Nick begin a real relationship, and he gives up his job. Amy and Kat reconcile. TJ, Kat's cousin, also apparently enjoys a moment with Woody after the wedding. Jeffrey learns absolutely nothing, and at the end is seen trying to get the attention of a female neighbor.

== Cast ==
- Debra Messing as Kat Ellis
- Dermot Mulroney as Nick Mercer
- Holland Taylor as Bunny Ellis, Kat's mother
- Peter Egan as Victor Ellis, Kat's step-father
- Amy Adams as Amy Ellis, Kat's younger half-sister
- Jack Davenport as Edward Fletcher-Wooten
- Sarah Parish as TJ, Kat's cousin
- Jeremy Sheffield as Jeffrey
- Jolyon James as Woody
- George Asprey as Pat
- C. Gerod Harris as Bike Messenger
- Martin Barrett as Teenager
- Jay Simon as Male Flight Attendant
- Danielle Lewis as Pretty Woman
- Ivana Horvat as Smitten Girl
- Linda Dobell as Sonja

== Production ==
Some outdoor scenes where they are playing rounders were filmed on location in Parliament Hill Fields, overlooking central London. The film was also filmed in parts of Surrey, including Shere, Chilworth, Godalming and Guildford.

== Soundtrack ==
- "Breathless" by The Corrs
- "Serenade for Lovers" by John Arkell and Ray Charles
- "Moonlight Waltz" by John Arkell
- "Grosvenor House" by Terry Day
- "King's Road" by Michael Melvoin
- "The Lavender Room" by Dick Walter
- "When We Are Together" by Texas
- "All Out of Love" by Air Supply
- "One Fine Day" by The Chiffons
- "Boogie Shoes" by KC and the Sunshine Band
- "Lovedance" by Dave Rogers and Paul Shaw
- "I Want You to Dance with Me" by Amy Ward
- "I Got the Feeling" by James Brown
- "Secret" by Maroon 5
- "Sway" by Michael Bublé
- "Home" by Michael Bublé
- "Save the Last Dance for Me" by Michael Bublé

== Reception ==
=== Box office ===
The Wedding Date grossed $31.7 million in the United States and Canada, and $15.4 million in other territories, for a worldwide total of $47.2 million.

=== Critical response ===
On Rotten Tomatoes the film holds an approval rating of 11% based on 142 reviews, with an average rating of 3.9/10. The site's critical consensus reads, "Critics are leaving The Wedding Date at the altar, calling it shopworn, bland, and lightweight." On Metacritic the film has a weighted average score of 32 out of 100, based on 34 critics, indicating "generally unfavorable reviews". Audiences polled by CinemaScore gave the film an average grade of "B" on an A+ to F scale.
