= The Search (TV series) =

British game show

The Search is a seven part television show on Channel 4, which first aired on 7 January 2007, and the final episode was broadcast on 24 February 2007. The premise of the programme was that ten contestants with unique skills must solve a variety of ancient clues and puzzles from throughout history, with the aim in each episode of finding "The Symbol". The team which fulfills this directive wins the game and the losing team must then sacrifice a team member. The final episode saw the remaining (three) contestants compete to uncover a £50,000 hidden treasure. This 'treasure' was located somewhere in the United Kingdom according to Jamie Theakston on the Steve Wright radio show on BBC Radio 2 broadcast on 26 January 2007.

The Search is presented and conceived by Jamie Theakston, inspired by the Kit Williams' children's book Masquerade and made by Princess Productions.

The programme was filmed at a variety of locations and made active use of historical buildings and themes incorporated in the puzzles. The first episode focused on Renaissance Italian themes; the second, Medieval French; the third, Mughal Indian; the fourth, Ancient Egyptian, the fifth Mayan Guatemala, the sixth Inca Peru and the seventh (finale), British History.

== Episode synopses ==
=== Episode One: Renaissance Italian Theme ===
The contestants meet in Venice and proceed to a boatyard called Arsenale di Venezia. Using Rotogravure maps they create a map to head to Corte del Milion. On the way, by gondola, the girls make a tactical error and go the wrong way, giving the boys the lead. At the location, the contestants break "la wan" wax balls, in accordance with the Chinese message hiding technique of steganography. Inside is the name of the next location, Florence.

In Florence, continuing the Renaissance theme, the Search makes use of the Uffizi and Accademia. In the Uffizi gallery, the girls follow a clue of "eye of the beholder" by following the line of sight of one of the statues. Their next clue takes them to the Medici Chapel (Medici financed many Renaissance artists). Here, the teams found the name of their next location to be the Abbey at San Galgano, whereupon they are forced to scour the site making use of perspective to reveal a perfect circle. Digging at the point where this circle was revealed unearthed the location clue for San Gimignano. The boys allowed the girls to win by not interfering when they saw them digging at the correct spot.

In San Gimignano the teams predictably had to climb the tallest of the famous towers to reveal numbers to input into a Cardano combination lock in the order of the Fibonacci Sequence. Doing so presented the final location clue for this episode, Pisa. While the boys worked well, Alexandra and Monica conflicted, leaving the girls' group dynamic in tatters. At Pisa, the teams were required to make use of a Cardano grille, leading them to search the Torre pendente di Pisa (campanile) for victory in the challenge. Mairianne chased after Simon, but was too late to beat him to the symbol.

As winners of the challenge, the male team progressed intact to episode two. Consequently, the women's team were required to take part in a poison chalice round and eventually eliminated Monica.

=== Episode Two: Religion and Medieval French Themes ===
First aired 14 January 2007.

The second episode began at Notre Dame de Paris. The team's first clue concerned distances, which meant they must go to Point Zero where all distances in France are measured from (now known as Kilometre Zero) near the cathedral, which had an arrow pointing to their next clue hidden in some bushes. The clue was French writing, translating to finding the rose window, which the contestants realised meant the famous rose windows of the cathedral. The girls struggled finding the clue at Point Zero, allowing the boys to get the head start. They found a pictorial stained glass by the rose window, and placing this over the French message filtered out certain letters, revealing the name Chartres, a town also famous for its cathedral, which became the teams' next location. The teams there made use of a passage in the Holy Bible, hinting to the stained glass windows where their next clue would be. Saskia and Alex shrewdly asked the tour guide to direct them to the artwork depicting Creation, while the men didn't ask for directions for Noah's Ark. The clue was a set of numbers, which corresponded to the passage they had read (i.e. 4 is the fourth character in the passage), to discover a coded message saying: "Ascend to the kings and angels via God’s first". The girls, however, misinterpreted the clue, believing it to be a more traditional book code of page numbers than character numbers. Though they still figured out the clue quicker, Adrian worked out the message meaning, climb the stairs marked G (God's first). This led the male team to the top of the cathedral and a small room furnished with statues of kings and angels. One of the statues contained a clue to the third location in this episode, the fortified town of Carcassonne. Thus, the boys won the first task.

At Carcassonne, the teams find a parchment covered in a dead regional language, consisting mostly of French, with hints of Latin and even Greek. However, the key is not the words, but particular letters, which have been pinpricked. Holding the paper up will allow light to shine through, revealing which letters are needed to make the name of the next location. The girls solve the clue quickly, with Suzie having knowledge in Victorian history from where the trick originates. Meanwhile, the boys are left floundering, with Simon and Nat disagreeing about how to solve the clue. The girls work out that they must go to La Tour du Trésau, one of over 50 towers in Carcassonne. In La Tour, the female team open a trapdoor which Mairianne and Saskia climb down through and find a collection of paintings with a clue to examine the 'subtext'. They soon wipe away the surface of the paintings and find letters spelling out Montségur, the fourth location in this challenge.

The mountain fort at Montsegur is reached by an arduous two-hour walk which proves too difficult for the male team contestant Alan, who resigns his place in the show and returns to England. At this point, the teams are numerically balanced in terms of personnel following Monica's elimination in the first episode. The boys' morale is left in shatters, but after a team talk, pull themselves together in the hope of regaining their lead. Reaching the summit the teams are required to locate rock-filled bags amongst ruins which they form into an Occitan cross. However, letters on the rocks also require placing in a particular way (inspired by Chinese trigrams), to reveal the final location, the caves of Grotte de Lombrives. The female team is the first to succeed and they arrive at the cave complex, and Alexandra and Saskia find a French message to look for the lady in the rock, actually referring to a rock formation which resembles a pair of women's legs. Despite Simon and Kristian catching up, Alexandra manages to find the symbol. Outside, Jamie reveals much to everyone's elation that the next location will be India.

Having been beaten to the symbol, the male team take part in the poisoned chalice and Nat is eliminated by Simon.

=== Episode Three: Mughal Indian Theme ===
First aired 21 January 2007, Channel 4.

The Indian themed episode 3 opens in Rajasthan. Breaking from the previous gender split teams, Jamie appoints last week's symbol finders Saskia and Alexandra as team captains. Saskia takes Simon and Marianne, while Alexandra picks Suzie, Kristian and Adrian.

The location for their first challenges is in Agra, at the site across the river from the Taj Mahal where Emperor Shah Jahan had intended to build his second Taj in black before he died. Their first task is to simply get across the river, but there is only one boat and it is tied by two ropes which are knotted up. The first team to untangle the rope will win, effectively, but the groups fail to realise it is actually a Gordian Knot. In History, the Gordian Knot was an intricate problem, so the rope was simply cut by a sword, hence the saying to refer to a rash and decisive action to solve a complicated problem. After untangling the rope first, Saskia's team realise the rope still stretches from a cart to the boat, and they remember the legend. Finding a sword in the cart, they cut the rope, meaning the other team will have to wait for the boat's return and receive a heavy time penalty. Inside the grounds of the Taj Mahal, the teams must find the "Pink Lady". Simon and Marianne completely miss a lady dressed in bright pink, whereas Suzie finds her immediately. The lady tells them to go to Agra Fort, where Shah Jahan was imprisoned by his son. There, the teams find sets of mirrors and numerous dark passageways. By reflecting the light between the mirrors down the hallways, the name of the next location, Jaipur, will be revealed. The task is inspired directly from History, where Shah Jahan was permitted to only see his beloved Taj Mahal through a mirror by his son. While Suzie and Alexandra conflict, both trying to get a say, Saskia works well with her team, and they quickly solve the task in a matter of minutes.

In Jaipur, incidentally known as the "Pink City", the teams have to explore astrology in the observatory at The Jantar Mantar. Two from each team must find a location in the area and memorise word sequences (the Indian skill of Dhagranamatrka), with which they can make the next location's name with the first letter from each. Suzie is frustrated by her teammates' struggle to navigate the simple grid road system, but still returns first with the words memorised. However, their lead is lost as both teams struggle with the answer simply staring them in the face. In the end, it is Saskia's team who work out the clue, which is to light the famous cannon. Naturally, the real cannon has only been fired once (which deafened the loader), so the contestants need only launch bottle rockets. Saskia's team do so, and outside Suzie and her group hear them go off, signaling their failure once again.

The teams progress to Udaipur and the Jag Niwas. We are told that the Hindu religion has over 300 million deities and the contestants explore Eklingji to learn more about Hinduism. Here, they find parchments in particular shrines, together making two handprint images which have 26 circles on. Saskia realises that it must be an alphabet (actually known as Nirbhasa). They manage to crack the code to make GANESH, and in the shrine for this God is their final clue. Both teams search for the symbol, and eventually Saskia finds it hidden under a statue of Ganesh.

Alexandra's team take part in the poisoned chalice round and eliminate Suzie from the competition.

=== Episode Four: Ancient Egypt and the Exodus Theme ===
First aired 3 February 2007, Channel 4.

The six contestants remaining are divided into male and female teams once again for the first challenge which opens in Cairo. In an unusual twist the teams discover their first clue is in the taxi which they arrive in after realising their journey has taken them in circles. Both teams rip the taxi apart, looking at the driver's documents and anything that could be a clue. After some time, the cars drive close to each other, and while communicating across to each other, Saskia hears that the boy's car has the same music playing. Listening to the music, the girls manage to make out a faint lyric, Red Pyramid, the name of their next location in Dahshur. Meanwhile, Simon's frustration at not being able to find the clue leads him to tell the driver to turn off the music so he can concentrate, leaving his team dead in the water. In Dahshur, each team receives a map which points toward tombs. They first head to the collapsed pyramid (or Black Pyramid), and follow in the footsteps of tomb-raiders by having to climb down a narrow entrance where they broke in. Here, they gain three rings. Once they find all three they have to shine light in a room in the nearby Bent Pyramid through the rings to reveal the name of the third location in the episode, Giza. It is the male team who achieve this first to win the first challenge of this episode.

The next challenge begins at night in Cairo at the Museum of Egyptian Antiquities. Ahead of the male team, the female team translate the Demotic language on a Rosetta Stone inspired parchment. They then find the correct exhibition and exhibit number, picking up their clue to visit the remains of the Egyptian rulers. Once there, they use an ultraviolet light to reveal their next location on some glass. Meanwhile, Simon and Adrian lag behind and are easily beaten.

The final day sees the teams begin in Saint Catherine's Monastery at the base of the Mount Sinai (the supposed location of the burning bush). As a Greek Orthodox, Alexandra is sent in, with Simon for the boys. Alex eventually finds the clue first, meaning the girls have first choice on how to get up the mountain, the long but easy camel ride, or the more direct but arduous trek up over 1000 steps. With the knowledge that Adrian will slow the boys down, the ladies take the dromedary camels. At the top of the mountain, the teams find a tablet with writing on it. However, there is also clue disguised as Arabic, to break the tablet as Moses did in Bible. Inside the teams find a map to help find the symbol, which is situated across the mountain terrain. Saskia heads straight for it, while Simon follows instinctively without any idea what to do himself. Consequently, Saskia finds the symbol first.

In the poison chalice round Kristian is surprisingly eliminated when he is passed the chalice by Simon for the final time.

=== Episode Five: Guatemala and Mayan Theme ===
First aired 10 February 2007, Channel 4.

Five contestants remain in Episode five (Saskia, Adrian, Simon, Mairianne and Alexandra), which opens in Antigua Guatemala. The first location is the Church of La Merced. From the church their first clue is to find an image of the Virgin Mary. While Adrian and Simon go down literally the wrong avenue of exploration (looking in the public toilets), Alex spots the image, leading the girls to two alfombra, which are carpets made from sawdust. Moving away this dust reveals the second location clue which Saskia achieves by kicking it. Adrian and Simon manage to catch up, but waste time not noticing the message hidden underneath the design.

Location two is the ruined Church of La Recoleccion, within which the contestants race to find a hidden scroll beneath an octagonal window. Their clue concerns the number eight, but they fail to notice the eight-sided windows. Marianne finds the scroll, though by flawed logic. Placing the cylindrical container for the scroll correctly mirrors a piece of artwork, revealing the name of the third location, the Pacaya volcano.

At the volcano the female team make a rapid ascent, but Alexandra struggles with chest pains. Unsurprisingly, in the male team, Adrian also has difficulty with the climb but Simon's encouragement urges him on. This is not enough to beat the girls, however, who shortly uncover the name of the fourth location blazing on sticks at the volcano's summit, Yaxhá, the ceremonial centre of the Maya civilization.

Arriving at the ruins in Yaxhá in the Petén forests, the teams reach the Mesoamerican pyramids, where they must decipher Mayan glyphs. Saskia's code breaking talent leads her to discover that this task requires simple knowledge of frequency analysis (cryptanalysis). Solving the clue with ease, the girls are directed to the river, where they must fill a well with water, causing refraction to allow them to view the name of the next location. However, in their haste, they fill the well with dirty water, preventing refraction due to the sand. Consequently, the boys, using clear water, solve the challenge first.

That night, Jamie informs the contestants that tomorrow they must work individually for the first time. The first to find the symbol shall be safe, with all others facing the poison chalice. The next day, all the contestants are given a map and a key. Their task is to use the poem on the back of the map to work out the order and which treasure boxes to visit in sequence. Alex is blinded by the pressure to succeed (knowing Saskia, Simon and Marianne are planning to vote her off), and forgets about the poem, heading to the final chest first. Meanwhile, Simon also goes in the wrong order while Adrian wastes time orienteering. As the number of keys in each box decreases, so too do the number of remaining participants. In the final straight, only two keys remain. Marianne gets the first, with Saskia getting the second. The two race for the symbol, and Saskia manages to uncover it first. Inside, she shrieks as tarantulas protect the symbol and runs back, giving Mairianne ample opportunity to steal the symbol for herself. However, she refuses to be so callous, and allows Saskia to come back and take the immunity from the chalice.

The remaining contestants take part in the poison chalice round the following day. Though Mairianne hesitates with guilt, she conforms to Simon and Saskia's plan, giving the chalice to Simon on the fourth pass, who quickly chooses to eliminate Alexandra. Mairianne worries that her hesitation might make her friends view her as a potential problem.

=== Episode Six: Peru with an Inca Theme ===
First aired 17 February 2007, Channel 4.

Episode six shows the remaining contestants (Simon, Adrian, Mairianne and Saskia) in the hunt for the penultimate symbol of the challenge. The episode begins in Cusco, Peru. Jamie's first clue directs the teams to the market square where they are to find a shaman. The teams for this episode are Simon and Mairianne versus Saskia and Adrian. Saskia and Adrian quickly take the lead on account of Saskia's fluency in Spanish, while Simon and Marianne struggle with the locals. Upon finding the shaman, the teams are presented with a basket containing seven snakes and a map. The map shows eleven locations, one of which (location 6) refers to a street known as 'Seven Snakes' (Siete Culebras). Again, Saskia's fluency becomes a significant advantage and she proceeds directly to that location. However, Simon and Mairianne are unaware of the significance and proceed to visit each location on the map following a "path of logic". Saskia and Adrian arrive at an Inca wall on the street and discover the clue behind a stone with a snake carved on it. The clue leads to Coricancha. Eventually, Simon and Mairianne ask a bilingual priest for assistance and are directed to the carved stones where they too discover the clue to the second part of the task.

With a time advantage, Saskia and Adrian arrive at Coricancha to find a replica golden disc (representing Inti) hanging from a circle of candles. Saskia attempts to melt the disc before realising that the clue is on the paper found in Cusco which depicted an archway above the name of Coricancha. Together with Adrian they begin their search of the site for an arch which matches the picture. When they find the arch, the room beyond it contains another paper clue with a picture of the golden disc and a word written in invisible ink. After some debate they realise this has to be returned to the candles and heated to allow the acid in the smoke to reveal the message. Meanwhile, upon seeing what Saskia is doing, Simon and Mairianne decide to copy her quickly, but in their haste allow their parchment to catch fire. Saskia's patience of slow heating pays off, revealing the next location (Wanuska Wasi).

In the next location (an Inca tomb complex), the teams have to follow a puma symbol through the network of caves before finding a wall with a code on it. Jamie had previously told them to "break the code", and in a pun, the contestants do not need to decipher the code, simply break the wall down with brute force. Saskia and Adrian solve this first and find a llama foetus wrapped in a cloth used as a shaman offering. Mairianne also solves the 'break' pun and, upon finding the shaman offering, appears to solve the message on the cloth ahead of Saskia. Despite this, it is Saskia and Adrian who have the lead in this challenge as they begin a rafting trip toward Ollantaytambo. Saskia and Adrian are physically disadvantaged in this task and Simon and Mairianne close the gap only to find the random current in the rapids slows them down. Andreas Holland explains the significance of Aguas Calientes as the teams solve a pigpen cipher, outlined in the shape of an ankh. With Adrian slowing Saskia down, Simon and Marianne arrive at the clue first and methodically work through the code to solve it before Saskia has a chance to decipher it. Before the final challenge, the teams eat guinea pig with local families and spend the night there.

The next day sees a solo challenge as each contestant has to use a series of Quipu devices to decipher names of locations in Machu Picchu, which they must navigate to using their maps. This problem is compounded by low visibility and drizzle common to the Yungas, making Simon demoralised. Saskia's skills in decryption see her solve the puzzles quickly, leading her first to the second quipu. However, on the third quipu, despite reaching it first, she wastes time going through all 25 shift codes instead of simply using a reverse substitution cipher, which Marianne does first to reveal "Young Peak". Meanwhile, Adrian and Simon have both been placed into the poison chalice round by solving the clues too slowly. With a slight lead of Saskia, Marianne sets off up Young Peak, a mountain next to Machu Picchu. However, she fails to notice her clue on the ground, a cryptic map resembling a hedgehog. Saskia finds it, and at the summit notices structure formations similar to the diagram. Once again, Saskia there finds the symbol, ensuring her a place in the final, leaving Marianne visibly upset that she didn't even get a fair shot at winning.

In the poison chalice round, Mairianne and Simon trade the chalice several times before it is passed to Adrian, who is eliminated.

=== Episode Seven (finale): England and Scotland with a Tudor Theme ===
First aired 24 February 2007, Channel 4.

With the show reaching its climax, the team return home to Great Britain, working individually to find the £50,000 prize money. Each contestant is allowed to have a previously eliminated player aid them in their final quest. Saskia chooses philosopher Nat, with Mairianne opting for codebreaking enthusiast Suzie, and Simon sticking with his old comrade Adrian. The first clue is at the National Portrait Gallery in London, where the teams must find a specific painting with an inscription. They must then enter the exhibit code into the audio tour guide, to hear Jamie's voice telling them where to go next, Hatfield House. It is Adrian who finds the words first, written faintly on a portrait of James I. He and Simon head off, though both Saskia and Mairianne are not far behind. At Hatfield House, Elizabeth I's childhood home, the team find a clue about the heir revealing itself. They then find a large hall with numerous mirrors. Adrian, in train of thought, actually says the answer, that heir is a play on words for "air", and breathing on the mirrors will reveal a message. Doubting himself, however, they allow their lead to slip away. Finally, Simon listens to Adrian about his theory, and they win the first task.

Task two sees the teams head for the London Library, where waiting for them are individual cryptic clues. While Mairianne and Saskia swiftly figure out that the clue is in fact catalogue directories to find a specific book in a library of literally millions, Simon refuses to listen to Adrian, believing the clue is itself an encryption. While they struggle, Saskia takes the lead and finds the next clue, to head to a nearby park. She and Nat arrive and Saskia quickly spots a Tudor rose, underneath which is the clue, Old Royal Naval College. There, the teams find a digraphic substitution cipher, and using the six symbols they learnt from around the world, they crack the code as "THE PLACENTIA", the courtyard outside. While both Simon and Saskia look around the area (Simon actually walking past where they must go next), Suzie suggests she and Marianne try to find underground access. The idea pays off, with Mairianne finding the seventh symbol. After much time-wasting, Saskia also finds the symbol, thereby giving her another chance in the final stage. Not long later, Simon and Adrian arrive to find only the poison chalice.

With just two teams remaining, The Search moves on to Edinburgh, Scotland. Here, Jamie tells the contestants that they'll find their next clue at Edinburgh Castle, Queen Mary's home while she was pregnant with James I. Both teams run up the Royal Mile to the castle, and are directed to Mary's private quarters (which they notice as a symbol outside corresponds with the seventh symbol). There, they find a piece of parchment and a cryptex. The parchment shows many Roman numerals, the answer being that they show the Tudor line of monarchs, the next in the sequence being James I or James VI in terms of Scotland, so the answer for the cryptex is SIXTH. Saskia works her mathematical brain looking for statistical logic in the sequence, naturally to little avail. Meanwhile, Mairianne remarkably comes to the correct answer in virtually moments of looking at the clue. Inside the cryptex is a clue to follow the hidden passageway. Pressing on the walls reveals a secret room, and inside the teams are locked in a dungeon with hundreds of different keys on the ground. Inside a barrel, they find a map with X marking the prize money, as well as the clue "He Be Loot", which is an anagram for Boot Heel, where the real key is hidden. Suzie speaks about how in one era they used to hide things in the soles of shoes, and when Marianne picks up one of the boots, the heel snaps off and the key is revealed. Despite not properly solving the anagram, the girls get a strong lead on Saskia for the final straight, the location of the treasure, Craigmillar Castle.

Once there, neither Suzie or Nat are permitted to enter the grounds while the game is still in play, meaning Mairianne and Saskia will be on their own. Arriving ahead, Mairianne runs round the area with her map, eventually finding the next clue, two gravestones with one marked as IR, and one as ER. Meanwhile, Saskia and Nat have also escaped the dungeon, and are right behind Marianne in a taxi, with Saskia offering the driver money if he can get her there immediately. Mairianne is now faced with a £50,000 decision: she must pick which grave to dig at. One contains the gold, another the poison chalice. To help her, she has a clue "In my end is my beginning" on a piece of parchment, along with a symbol. The quote is actually of Mary's before her execution at Elizabeth's hands, referring to her son James, who would take the monarchy and start the reign of the Stuarts over the Tudors. Thus, in her end is her name's beginning against Elizabeth. The symbol is also made up of the characters in her name, overlapped to make MARIE STUART. While ER is Elizabeth Regina, IR is Jacobus Rex (as there was no J in the Latin alphabet, I was used to represent King James), meaning the IR grave contains the treasure. Along the way, other clues were also present, like the London Library being on St. James's Square, the contestants running through St. James's Court while running up the Royal Mile, and IR written on the ceiling in the private chambers at Edinburgh Castle. But has Mairianne spotted these clues?

She decides that the symbol is the crest of Elizabeth, and digs at the ER grave. While still digging, Saskia finally arrives, and is forced to dig the unoccupied grave whether she agree with the decision or not. Both girls struggle to pull out their treasure chests, and open the boxes simultaneously. A look of disappointment spreads across Mairianne's face as she pulls out the poison chalice, while Saskia weeps as she finds £50,000 in gold coins.

The final credits show Saskia's journey throughout the show, with the final shot of her lifting up the sixth symbol from Peru to the heavens, to the magnificent backdrop of Machu Picchu.

== Contestants ==
Name	Details	Elimination
Adrian Benjamin	A 64-year-old vicar from London whose congregation at All Saints Church in Whetstone includes Lady Thatcher. Educated at Oxford, Adrian read Theology and English. He returned to the show in Episode Seven to assist Simon in the finale.	Episode Six
Alan Fildes	A 58-year-old Egyptologist with over 30 years experience in ancient history. Literate in hieroglyphics, Alan is a specialist in the Egyptian Old Kingdom and the location of pyramids. Alan elected to resign his part near Montségur in Episode Two.	Walked in Episode Two
Alexandra	A 27-year-old French girl educated in architecture and interior design. Alexandra is fluent in French, English and Greek as well as possessing a knowledge of Latin, Italian and Ancient Greek.	Episode Five
Kristian Bradshaw	A 27-year-old from London educated at Cambridge where he read Modern and Medieval Languages. He now practises as a solicitor, having completed a postgraduate diploma in law.	Episode Four
Mairianne Reardon	A 24-year-old head hunter in The City, originally from Great Torrington in Devon. Mairianne was educated at Oxford where she read music after achieving a choral scholarship.	Runner-up
Monica	A 51-year-old freelance editor from London with a master's degree in Medieval History and a Bachelor's degree in Arabic. Monica's apparent inability to integrate with her fellow female contestants may have led to her being the first to be eliminated in the female team's first poisoned chalice.	Episode One
Nat Coleman	A 25-year-old Londoner and graduate of Oxford and the Institut d'etudes Politiques. Nat has degrees in Classics and Political Philosophy and is a keen dramatist. Nat's laboured methodical approach may have led to his being eliminated in the male team's first poisoned chalice though he returned to the show in Episode Seven to successfully pair with Saskia for the finale.	Episode Two
Saskia de Groot	A 24-year-old talented polyglot whose German father is a Professor of Genetics. Saskia is studying for a PhD in Bioinformatics at Oxford and is fluent in German, French and Spanish. Like Alexandra, Saskia also has a knowledge of Ancient Greek and Latin. Saskia's MySpace blog details her personal experiences on The Search. The eventual winner of The Search in Episode Seven, Saskia collected £50,000 in prize money.	Winner
Simon	A 32-year-old Londoner with a master's degree in Contemporary Art from the Courtauld Institute, Simon lectures in history. Simon appeared to be a significant reason for the success of the male team in Episode One. Despite strong performances in earlier 'rounds', Simon's performance in the final was weak, in part due to his reluctance to take advice from Adrian.	3rd place (chalice).
Suzie Devey-Humpleby	A 39-year-old from Hartlepool and enthusiastic treasure hunter with a Master's degree in Tourism Management and a First Bachelor of Arts degree in Business Administration. Suzie was eliminated in the third poisoned chalice however she returned in Episode Seven to assist Marianne in the finale.	Episode Three
