= Mad About Alice =

- Created by: Paul Waite
- Starring: Amanda Holden; Jamie Theakston; Alex Leam
- Country of origin: United Kingdom
- No. of seasons: 1
- No. of episodes: 6

Production
- Producer: Sue Birbeck
- Running time: 30 minutes

Original release
- Network: BBC One
- Release: 23 January – 27 February 2004

Mad About Alice is a British sitcom that ran during 2004 for six episodes. Described as a sitcom with a silent 'h', it is regarded as one of the worst BBC sitcoms of 2004. It has never been repeated on the BBC, and there are no plans to release it on DVD, although some episodes are available on YouTube.

== Premise ==
It centres on the lives of a divorced couple and their young son. Despite no longer living together, Doug (Jamie Theakston) and Alice (Amanda Holden) remain in close contact due to joint custody of their nine-year-old son Joe.

== Cast ==
- Amanda Holden – Alice
- Jamie Theakston – Doug
- John Gordon Sinclair – Ted
- Debra Stephenson – Kate
- Billy Hill – Joe
- Alex Leam - Simon
- Dan Clark – Jason
- Jessica Carrivick – Sancha
- Jolyon James – Scott
- Isabel Brook – Rachael
- Stephanie O'Rourke – Jodie
- Sarah Carver – Clare

== Characters ==
- Alice – A single mother to son Joe, who is nine years old. Juggles between being a mum, having a job, a new boyfriend, and an ex-husband who keeps popping in and out of her home. She was a waitress when she met the dashing medical student Doug, the two fell in love, got married and had baby Joe in swift succession and for a while it looked as though they would live happily ever after. However, when Doug accepted a promotion – miles away from their home, Joe's little school and Alice's new part-time job – without consulting her they had their biggest row and broke up.
- Doug – Alice's ex-husband. Despite his failings as a husband, Doug is determined to be a good father and now lives around the corner so that he can be a hands-on Dad, a situation which is a constant source of irritation to Alice. Since the split, Doug has had girlfriends and most recently dated Rachael, a pediatric surgeon, whom he met at work.
- Simon - Game show host and Alice's love interest.
- Ted – Alice's dearest and most reliable old friend who has known Alice from school, all through her relationship with Doug. After Doug and Alice split up, Alice started taking her part-time job with Ted far more seriously and now they've become partners in a small architectural firm. Although Ted is extremely intelligent, when confronted with a room of people he is not very articulate, a trait which does not help him sell himself in business.
- Jason – Works in the office with Alice and Ted, assisting with the daily administration of the office. Except that he really is no help at all and generally makes matters worse. The only reason he retains his position is because Ted and Alice had to give him the job to repay a favour from his parents.
- Kate – Alice's sister who lives around the corner and is a teacher at Joe's primary school. Her attempts to help end in disaster and it seems as though Kate has spent just a little too much time with young children and not enough time in the real world.
- Joe – Nine-year-old son of Alice and Doug.
- Sancha – Joe's deadly serious, slightly scary schoolfriend.

It was filmed in Hampton Wick, London

== Episodes ==
- Handover – Alice's life is turned upside-down when her ex-husband, Doug, announces that he has a new girlfriend and he's going to introduce their son, Joe, to her at the weekend. This marks a change in their relationship but not the way Alice expected.
- Alice's Restaurant – Alice is forced to confront the past when she takes her boyfriend, Scott, to a romantic restaurant that she and Doug used to frequent, in an attempt to prove that the place no longer holds any ghosts for her.
- School Craze – Alice's attempts to get Joe into her preferred secondary school end up with her and Doug facing an interview with the headmaster – just to see what sort of parents they are.
- Sick as a Parrot – Alice's plans for Joe's birthday are hijacked by Doug, and she finds herself lumbered with a psychotic parrot that's holding a grudge.
- Break Up – Alice's sister cannot keep a boyfriend for longer than a week, so Alice decides to do a spot of match-making. But her plans backfire when she fixes up Kate with one of Doug's best friends.
- D.I.V.O.R.C.E – Doug's girlfriend discovers that he and Alice are still technically married as they never got round to signing their divorce papers, so Doug calls round to ask Alice to sign them. Are they finally going to end their marriage?
