= Jamie Theakston =

English television presenter, producer, narrator and actor

- Born: James Paul Theakston; 21 December 1970 (age 55); Cuckfield, West Sussex, England
- Occupations: Presenter, producer, narrator, actor
- Years active: 1990 – present
- Employers: Heart Radio; Channel 5
- Known for: Heart Radio; Top of the Pops; Live & Kicking; Traffic Cops (narrator); Motorway Cops (narrator)
- Spouse: Sophie Siegle (m. 2007)
- Children: 2
- Website: jamietheakstonofficial.co.uk

James Paul Theakston (born 21 December 1970) is an English television presenter, producer, narrator and actor. He has hosted television programmes for the BBC, ITV, Channel 4 and Channel 5. He co-presented the Saturday morning BBC One children's show Live & Kicking alongside Zoe Ball between 1996 and 1999, and hosted episodes of the music programme Top of the Pops between 1998 and 2003. He co-hosts the national breakfast show with Amanda Holden on Heart Radio. Theakston narrated the BBC documentary series Traffic Cops from 2003 to 2015, and on Channel 5 from 2016 onwards.

== Education ==
His family had moved to the Sussex area in 1967, with his father being the UK general manager of Centronics in Burgess Hill, known mostly for the industry-standard 36-pin parallel port micro ribbon connector. He attended Ditchling primary school. He played in goal from 1979 to 1983 for Ditchling junior football team, where he was in the cub scouts.

He joined the National Youth Theatre at the age of 13, where he appeared in plays including Murder in the Cathedral and Marat/Sade alongside contemporaries such as Daniel Craig, but he was put off from pursuing a full-time acting career by the financial hardships that he encountered. After leaving Lancing College with nine O-Levels and one GCSE in Maths, retaking it at BHASVIC. He gained three A levels in 1989.

He attended North London Polytechnic (now London Metropolitan University), from which he graduated with a first class degree in business studies. Whilst at university, he read traffic bulletins on BBC GLR because he wanted to get into sports reporting.

He played cricket for Ditchling throughout the 1990s. His father had previously played for the local team from 1969, as an opening batsman, and captained the team, and was goalkeeper for the football team, like his son.

== Life and career ==
=== Radio ===
Before embarking on a broadcasting career, he worked for auctioneers Christie's, and planned to study art history at the Courtauld Institute. However, after undertaking football and cricket reports for GLR and BBC Radio 5 Live, he was spotted by the BBC's head of sport and hired to present GLR's Saturday Sport Show at the age of 23. He then presented shows for BBC Radio 5 Live including Sportscall, The Jamie Theakston Cricket Show and Sport on Wednesday. Theakston joined Radio 1 in April 1999 to present the Sunday Lunch show. He fronted the 'One Big Sunday' events during 2000. He moved to a Saturday morning slot in 2001. He also acted as holiday cover on the station.

He left Radio 1 in 2002 to pursue an acting career, his last show being broadcast on 28 September. He joined London radio station Heart 106.2 in May 2005, replacing Jonathan Coleman on Heart Breakfast with Harriet Scott, which won Gold for Best Music Personality Show at the New York Festivals and the Silver Entertainment Award at the Sony Radio Academy Awards, both in 2007. Theakston (along with Scott) won the Radio Presenter of the Year award at the Arqiva Commercial Radio Awards in June 2009. Scott left Heart Breakfast in 2013; she was replaced by Spice Girl Emma Bunton, who already had a show on the Heart network. Bunton left in 2018.

On 3 June 2019, Heart Breakfast went national across the UK, following a decision by the UK radio regulator OFCOM to reduce local programming requirements. Theakston hosts the show alongside Amanda Holden.

Between Bunton's departure and Holden's arrival, Heart DJ Lucy Horobin was brought in as a temporary co-host for Theakston.

=== Television ===
On television, Theakston presented The O Zone with Jayne Middlemiss from 1995 to 2000. He hosted 99 episodes of Top of the Pops from 1998 to 2003, the most number of Top of the Pops episodes in the 1990s.

He co-presented both Live & Kicking (1996–1999) and The Priory alongside Zoe Ball. Theakston featured beside Zoë Ball once again in Channel 5's Britain's Best Brain series, which aired in October 2009.

He has also hosted a number of other shows, including the Channel 4 reality TV show The Games alongside Kirsty Gallacher; game show, Beg Borrow or Steal (2004); prime-time Saturday night show The People's Quiz; Channel 4's The Search; and ITV Saturday night show With A Little Help From My Friends. From July–August 2013, Theakston and Emma Bunton presented ITV's This Morning Summer on Friday mornings.

Theakston's other presenting work includes fronting the Glastonbury Festival coverage for the BBC, the Oscars, the Grammys, A Question of Pop, UK Music Hall of Fame and Guinness World Records. He narrated all episodes of Traffic Cops and its spin-off show Motorway Cops, and since 2015 has narrated episodes of Caught on Camera.

He also played himself in the mock-interview series Rock Profile in which he interviewed "celebrities" impersonated by Matt Lucas and David Walliams, and in the episode "Video Killed the Radio Star" of the TV series FM in March 2009.

=== Acting ===
As an actor, Theakston has appeared in Agatha Christie's Marple and Little Britain. Theakston has acted with Amanda Holden in Mad About Alice (2004) and worked with Adam Faith on the series Murder in Mind in 2003, shortly before Faith's death. He has also starred in the West End in the plays Art and Home and Beauty at the Lyric Theatre, Shaftesbury Avenue. In 2004, he appeared in Agatha Christie's Miss Marple: Body in the Library.

== Personal life ==
Theakston lived for about ten years in Wings Place, a Tudor mansion in Ditchling, East Sussex. Theakston married Sophie Siegle in Ditchling on 15 September 2007, and they live in west London. They have two children. He was previously romantically linked to socialite Lady Victoria Hervey, singer Natalie Appleton, actress Joely Richardson, and models Erin O'Connor and Sophie Dahl.

He is a fencer and competed for Sussex in 1985. As captain of Ditchling Cricket Club, Theakston was a member of the first cricket team from England to play the Afghan cricket team in Kabul.

He is a member of Mensa, a Patron of Humanists UK and a supporter of Brighton & Hove Albion.

In September 2024, Theakston announced that he had been diagnosed with stage I laryngeal cancer, but said that the prognosis was "very positive". He finished treatment in January 2025, and has since made a full recovery.

=== Charity ===
In 2003 Theakston travelled to Uganda to meet with former child soldiers. He is a patron for Cancervive, a charity established to address the needs of anyone whose family or friends are cancer-sufferers.

He played in his fifth successive Soccer Aid match at Old Trafford in June 2014. Having, in 2010, saved four penalties for England against the Rest of the World in a penalty shoot-out, before missing a penalty himself in a defeat, he was later named man of the match for his performance in goal.

On 4 October 2019, Theakston undertook a Bike Britain Challenge; a cycling event for Global's charity Make Some Noise. The event lasted eight days, with Theakston cycling 650 miles from Edinburgh and arriving in London on the 11th. Along the way, he stopped at Newcastle upon Tyne, Leeds, Manchester, Birmingham, Cardiff and Bristol, and met life-threatened children and their families.

=== Brothel visit, cocaine usage, and failed injunction ===
In 2002, Theakston's visit to a Mayfair brothel was exposed by British newspaper The Sunday People. Theakston attempted to prevent publication of his paying £40 for sex and his cocaine snorting with a legal injunction. The judge, Mr Justice Ouseley, allowed publication of the story based on interviews and said, "If a well-known man has sexual relations with a prostitute in a brothel, the desire on his part to keep their actions and 'relationship' confidential and the desire on the part of the other to exploit their actions and relationship commercially are irreconcilable." He went on to say, "I consider that the scales would be likely to come down in favour of the freedom of expression of the newspaper and of the prostitutes unless it was clear that there was a strong case of inhibiting it."

== Performance credits ==
West End theatre
| Play | Venue | Year |
|---|---|---|
| Marat/Sade | Playhouse | |
| Murder in the Cathedral | Spitalfields | |
| 'Art' | Whitehall | |
| Home and Beauty | Lyric | |

== Filmography ==
=== Television ===
| Year | Programme | Channel | Notes |
|---|---|---|---|
| 2004 | Drive (The Afternoon Play) | BBC One | |
| 1999–2002 | The Priory | Channel 4 | |
| | Natural Born Losers | BBC One | |
| | Pick n Mix | UK Play | |
| | Comic Relief | BBC One | |
| | The Brits | ITV | |
| 2001 | 100 Greatest Kids Shows | Channel 4 | |
| | Behind the Music | VH1 | |
| | Richest Kids | ITV | |
| | Bitesize | BBC Two | |
| 2004 | The Simpsons Quiz | Channel 4 | |
| 2004 | The UK Music Hall of Fame | Channel 4 | |
| | 50 Years, 50 Records | ITV | |
| | The Oscars: Live | Sky One/Sky Movies | |
| 1983 | Taggart | ITV | |
| 1995–2000 | The O-Zone | BBC Two | |
| 1996–1999 | Live & Kicking | BBC One | |
| 1996-1997 | Landmarks (Portrait of Europe (1996), Ancient Egypt (1997) | BBC Two | |
| 1997–2000 | Glastonbury Festival | BBC One/BBC Two | |
| 1997–2003 | Top of the Pops | BBC One | |
| 1998 | Blankety Blank | BBC One | Guest |
| 1998 | Confessions | BBC One | Guest |
| 1998 | Not a Lot of People Know That | BBC One | Guest |
| 1998–1999 | Grammy Awards | BBC One | |
| 1999 | Wish You Were Here | ITV | |
| 1999 | Total Eclipse | BBC One | |
| 1999 | It's Only TV...but I Like It | BBC One | Guest |
| 1999 | NetAid | BBC Two | |
| 1999 | Phones, Robbers and Videotape | BBC One | |
| 1999 | 2000 Today | BBC One | |
| 1999–? | Children in Need | BBC One | |
| 1999–2000 | Rock Profile | BBC Two | |
| 2000–2001 | A Question of Pop | BBC One | |
| 2000 | Before They Were Famous | BBC One | Guest |
| 2000 | Bob Martin | ITV | |
| 2000 | BBC Music Live | BBC One | |
| 2000 | Holiday | BBC One | |
| 2000 | Secret Life of Stars | BBC One | |
| 2000 | Stars of Tomorrow | BBC One | |
| 2000 | Trading Places | BBC One | |
| 2001 | The True Story of TOTP | BBC Two | Host |
| 2001 | Aqua | BBC Two | |
| 2001 | Car Wars | BBC One | |
| 2001 | Linda Green | BBC One | |
| 2002 | Sport Relief | BBC One | |
| 2002 | Queen's Jubilee Concert | BBC One | |
| 2003 | Murder in Mind | BBC One | |
| 2003–2006 | The Games | Channel 4 | |
| 2003— | Traffic Cops | BBC One (2003–2015); Channel 5 (2016—) | |
| 2004 | Mad About Alice | BBC One | |
| 2004 | Beg, Borrow or Steal | BBC Two | |
| 2004 | Little Britain | BBC Three | |
| 2004 | Agatha Christie's Marple ("The Body in the Library") | ITV | |
| 2004–2005 | With a Little Help from My Friends | ITV | |
| 2005 | All*Star Cup | Sky One | |
| 2007 | Concert for Diana | BBC One | |
| 2007 | The National Lottery People's Quiz | BBC One | |
| 2007 | The Search | Channel 4 | |
| 2008–2015 | Motorway Cops | BBC One | |
| 2009 | FM | ITV2 | |
| 2013 | This Morning Summer | ITV | |
| 2013– | Forbidden History | Yesterday/UKTV | |
| 2015– | Caught on Camera | ITV | |
| 2016 | Dogs Might Fly | Sky One | |
| 2017 | Richard Osman's House of Games | BBC Two | |

=== Radio ===
| Year | Programme | Channel | Notes |
|---|---|---|---|
| | Saturday Sports Show | GLR | |
| | Sportscall | BBC Radio 5 | |
| | Friday Night on 5 | BBC Radio 5 | |
| | Jamie Theakston's Cricket Show | BBC Radio 5 | |
| | Radio 5 Sport | BBC Radio 5 | |
| | The Sunday Lunch | BBC Radio 1 | |
| | The Jamie Theakston Show | BBC Radio 1 | |
| | The Griff Rhys Jones Show | BBC Radio 2 | |
| | One Big Sunday | BBC Radio 1 | |
| 2005–2012 | Heart Breakfast with Jamie Theakston and Harriet Scott | Heart London | |
| 2013–2018 | Heart Breakfast with Jamie and Emma | Heart London | |
| 2019– | Heart Breakfast with Jamie and Amanda | Heart | |
