= Roads Policing Unit =

Traffic unit of a British police force

A roads policing unit (RPU), or a similarly named unit in some forces, is the specialist road traffic police unit of a British police force.

== Responsibilities ==
RPUs work with the National Police Chiefs' Council roads policing strategy, Policing our Roads Together, which has five strands:

- Casualty reduction.
- Counter-terrorism.
- Reducing anti-social use of the roads.
- Denying criminals the use of the roads.
- Public reassurance by high visibility patrolling of the road network.

RPU officers are responsible for patrolling the main motorways and large roads throughout the territorial police force area. In addition to their general road policing duties, they assist with various operations aimed at improving road safety and are also at the forefront in tackling vehicle crime and the criminal use of the roads network. They are also available to back up other units, as they are constantly roaming an area as part of their high visibility patrolling work.

== Serious Collision Investigation Unit ==
A sub-unit of the RPU is the Serious Collision Investigation Unit (SCIU). The SCIU is made up of traffic officers who are trained to be specialist collision investigators, they deploy to and investigate Road Traffic Collisions where the enquiry is complex and beyond the capacity of standard traffic trained officers or a local borough based officers, such as:

- Fatal Road Traffic Collisions.
- Collisions where injuries are significantly life-threatening or significantly life-changing.
- Collisions that are likely to attract significant media attention.
- Collisions that may be referred to the Independent Office for Police Conduct or the force's Professional Standards Department.
- Police Vehicle Collisions that involve a fatality, serious injury or a serious breach of Driver Standards.

The SCIU are often supported by the Forensic Collision Reconstruction Unit (FCRU) who identifies, preserves and records all physical material at the scene of the collision, using digital surveys, 3D laser scans and photography. FCRU officers will provide expert testimony in court as to how the collision has occurred.

== Equipment ==
=== ProVIDA ===
The ProViDa In Car Video System is fitted to both marked and unmarked traffic patrol cars and motorcycles with the aim of improving driver behaviour and road safety. It is used to detect traffic offences and to educate, advise and, if necessary, prosecute offenders.

Components of the system:

- Colour video camera with pan and zoom control in the front and back.
- Video data generator which records date and time.
- Police pilot speed detection device and speed indicator (recording both police, and other vehicles speed).
- Mobile VHS video cassette recorder with a remote control unit. VHS is now being replaced with Digital Hard Drive Recorders or DVD recording systems.
- Two colour monitors, one each for front and rear seat occupants.

Whilst on patrol, a police officer who observes a blatant offence or an example of bad driving can record the incident on tape. Once they have stopped the driver concerned, they can then invite the motorist to sit in the police car, where the incident is replayed. A motorist can request a copy of the video evidence should the matter be dealt with at court.

Depending on the circumstances of the offence, the motorist can then be advised regarding their driving, cautioned or prosecuted, when the video recording can be used in court if necessary.

JAI PROVIDA 2000 is a sophisticated in-car video and speed enforcement system for 24-hour detection of traffic offences and criminal acts. System recordings can be used in court as visual evidence, including reconstruction of events.

=== VASCAR ===
VASCAR (Visual Average Speed Computer And Recorder) is a technology for determining the speed of a moving vehicle. It is used by police officers to catch speeding motorists. These devices are mounted on a patrol car's console, allowing the officer easy access to its controls. Many main roads in the UK now have horizontal lines of about two feet in length painted on the carriageway, which allow the VASCAR system to be calibrated.

VASCAR units were first fitted to police vehicles in the mid-1970s.

=== Automatic number plate recognition ===
The automatic number plate recognition (ANPR) system is housed in a mobile unit. Both colour and infrared cameras are used to capture images of vehicle number plates as they pass by. The index number is read automatically and checked against a number of databases.

If a match is made to a vehicle of police interest, the ANPR operator receives an alarm. The operator can then alert other officers to stop the vehicle.

=== Uniform ===
Traffic officers wear a white-topped or day-glo yellow peaked cap, and sometimes a white-topped bowler hat for female officers.

== Roads Policing Unit in different forces ==
All forces currently maintain their own roads policing unit, since the disbandment of the Central Motorways Police Group and North West Motorway Police Group in 2024 and 2025 respectively.

Between 1990 and 2024, the CMPG provided a basis for collaboration between the roads policing units of four police forces (those of Staffordshire, the West Midlands, Warwickshire and West Mercia) in the West Midlands region. The NWMPG functioned on similar terms, formed in 2008 as a collaboration between the roads policing units of four different police forces (those of Cheshire, Mersesyide, Greater Manchester and Lancashire). It closed in April 2025, seven months after the closure of the CMPG.

Roads Policing Units are referred to by different names in some police forces, although generally serving the same purpose.

Non-normal names of Roads Policing Units in British police forces
Police force	Name of traffic unit
North Yorkshire Police	Roads Policing Group
Metropolitan Police	Roads and Transport Policing Command
West Midlands Police	Force Traffic Unit
Merseyside Police	Matrix: Roads Policing Unit

== See also ==
- Highway patrol
- Police car
- Roads and Transport Policing Command (Metropolitan Police roads policing unit)
