= Road Wars (TV series) =

- Series 6 titlecard
- Created by: Bill Rudgard; Steve Warr
- Narrated by: Lee Boardman (2003–09); Claire Goose (2009–2010)
- Country of origin: United Kingdom
- Original language: English
- No. of series: 8
- No. of episodes: 96

Production
- Producer: Raw Cut TV
- Running time: 50–60 minutes (inc. adverts)
- Production company: Raw Cut Productions

Original release
- Network: Sky1
- Release: 26 July 2003 – 24 January 2010

Related
- Street Wars; Police Interceptors

Road Wars is a British police reality television programme created by Raw Cut TV for British Sky Broadcasting and broadcast on Sky1 from 26 July 2003 to 24 January 2010. From the first series, the show was narrated by actor Lee Boardman. From halfway through the seventh series, the programme was narrated by actress Claire Goose.

As of 2023, the show has repeats on Sky Showcase, Sky Replay, Sky Mix, Sky Witness and Sky Crime.

== Format ==
Road Wars followed the work of police officers in the United Kingdom, documenting the changing tactics of criminals and the response of the various police forces. For six series, the show followed officers in the Thames Valley, but moved to Devon and Cornwall for the last series in 2009. The programme also features some police videos both in the UK and the United States.

Lee Boardman narrated the show until the second half of series 7, employing a light-hearted and pun-intended approach. At the opening narration, Boardman says "In Road Wars, the unexpected is always just around the corner".

The title music was composed by Nainita Desai and Malcolm Laws. Other music was made by the series' co-creator Bill Rudgard. In the first series, the title card consisted of 'ROAD WARS' in red dot-matrix form. A new title card was made for the third series, which was slightly edited with yellow accents for the sixth series. The first two series had six episodes, series 3 and 4 had eight episodes each, and series 5 and 6 had 20 episodes each.

For the seventh series, as the show moved to another police force, a new title card and new music was composed. Boardman left his position as narrator and the final eight episodes of the programme were narrated by actress Claire Goose.

== Thames Valley Police ==
For series 1–6, the programme followed the fourteen members of the Thames Valley Police's roads policing proactive unit (Road Crime Unit) – known as "Tango Victor". They are also said to be known to fellow officers as "Tango Vulture", taken from their callsign prefix TV (Tango Victor) and the joke that they swoop to steal arrests from other officers while they carried out their duties.

The footage from this team is combined with video footage from police forces around the world (though largely UK and US forces).

=== Officers ===
Officers involved in Road Wars are listed below. As a specialist unit, officers tended to appear in a couple of series, or just for one series.

Series 1 originals

- PC Tony Sams (series 1, 2 and 3)
- PC Robb Webb (series 1, 2 and 3)
- PC Jamie Gilson (Grant's pre-Derek partner making a cameo in series 1)
- PC Pete Lomas (series 1 and 2)
- PC Carl Lewis (series 1, 2 and 3)
- PC Jim Lovell (series 1, 2 and 3)
- PC Pat Knight (series 1, 2 and 3)
- PC Mark Carrington (series 1, 2 and 3)
- PC Grant Thomas
  (series 1 and a quick appearance in series 3, and in series 4 as a desk sergeant)
- PC Dave Morgan (series 1, 2 and 3)
- PC Derek Ingram
  (series 1, 2, 3 and in two episodes in series 6)
- PC Andy Samuels
  (series 1, 2 and 3 – quick appearance in an ep in series 4)
- PC Chris Piggott (series 1, 2, 3, 4 and 5)
- PC Conrad Lee
  (series 1, 2, 3 and series 6, although he appeared in series 4 as a bike cop)

Series 4 originals

- PC Mark Thornley (Series 4)
- PC Ian Hewitson 'Hewi' (Series 4)
- PC Martin York 'Yorkie' (an ep in series 3, series 4 and 5)
- PC Chris Ruff 'Ruffy' (series 4 and 5)
- PC Simon Hills (series 4, 5 and 6)
- PC James Dixon 'Dixie' (series 4, 5 and 6) (deceased - due to a motorcycle collision on 5 December 2017)
- PC Charlie Etheridge (series 4, 5 and 6)
- PC Ronnie Welsh (series 4 and 5)
- PC Jim Mahoney (series 4 and 5)
- PC Iestyn Llewellyn – with Boris the dog (series 4 and 5)
- PC Rosie Vosser
  (series 4, 5, and a cameo in series 6)
- PC Roma Bolsover
  (series 4, 5 and 6 although appeared in the early series in the background)
- PC Pete Lloyd (series 4, 5 and 6)
- PC Darren Staley 'Daz' (series 4, 5 and 6)
- PC Chris Waller
  (Quick appearance in series 4, regular in series 6)
- PC Helen Lacey – with Bonnie the dog (Series 5 and 6)

Series 6 originals

- PC Dan Ruffle
- PC Kevin Murphy
- PC Michelle Ryan 'Mish'
- PC Andy Burden 'Flipper'
- PC Jason Evans
- PC Wayne Mills 'Millsy'
- PC Anna McShane
- PC Tony Griffiths 'Griff'
- PC Tom French 'Frenchy'
- PC Dave Black
- PC Tristan Newsome – with Bella the dog
- PC Brian Avery – with Jake the dog
- PC Barry Logan – with Matt the dog

=== Regular teams ===
- Pete and Tony (Series 1)
- Derek and Grant (Series 1)
- Tony and Robb (Series 1)
- Conrad and Dave (Series 1–3)
- Rob and Abbo (Series 1–3)
- Pat and Carl (Series 1–3)
- Chris and Andy (Series 1–3)
- Tony and Derek (series 2–3)
- Simon and Chris (series 4–5)
- Mark and Hewi (Series 4)
- Yorkie and Dixie (Series 4–5)
- Daz and Rosie (Series 4–5)
- Ruffy and Charlie (Series 4–5)
- Matt and Dan (Series 4–5)
- Ronnie and Roma (Series 4–5)
- Frenchy and Roma (Series 6)
- Lloydy and Millsy (Series 6)
- Anna and Dave (Series 6)
- Charlie and Mish (Series 6)
- Kev and Dixie (Series 6)
- Waller and Flipper (Series 6)
- Griff and Anna (Series 6)
- Simon and Conrad (Series 6)

=== Vehicles ===
The Thames Valley Police unit operates high-specification, unmarked 3.2L V6 Vauxhall Omegas (B2 model), replaced in later series by unmarked 2.8L Turbo V6 Police Special Vauxhall Vectras. The unit is tasked with taking a proactive role in fighting crime especially targeted towards street robbers and burglars, but also undertaking general traffic policing (the officers are drawn from normal Roads Policing teams).

== Devon & Cornwall Police ==
In October 2008 Thames Valley Police pulled out from the show after concerns on how its officers are depicted. From Series 7, the show moved on to follow the Road Crime Unit and the front line Dog Squad of Devon and Cornwall Police. The Road Crime Unit operates marked BMW 3 Series along with unmarked 2.5L Ford Focus STs.

== Transmissions ==
There have been eight series of Road Wars. Four special episodes have been shown including two American episodes (known as Road Wars USA), which aired in 2005, where British police from the series travel to the U.S. to see the difference in police and criminal behaviour and two Christmas specials shown in 2003 and 2004. Three compilation editions entitled "Ultimate Road Wars", featuring action from the first six series, first aired on Sky1 on 11 November, 13 November and 1 December 2008.

Series	Episodes	First released	Last released	Police force
1	6	26 July 2003	30 August 2003	Thames Valley Police
2	6	21 June 2004	26 July 2004	Thames Valley Police
3	8	3 March 2005	21 April 2005	Thames Valley Police
4	8	5 October 2006	23 November 2006	Thames Valley Police
5	20	8 May 2007	18 September 2007	Thames Valley Police
6	20	29 July 2008	9 December 2008	Thames Valley Police
7	20	17 February 2009	30 June 2009	Devon & Cornwall Police
8	8	30 November 2009	24 January 2010	Devon & Cornwall Police

== Special ==
In a special two part series called Road Wars USA, Andy Samuels and Chris Piggott spent a couple of months attached to a Gang Unit in Cicero, Illinois, near Chicago, to note how law enforcement is practised in the United States.

== International broadcasts ==
The Road Wars series has also been sold to these television networks and stations:

Country	Channel
Netherlands^{1}	RTL 7
New Zealand	TV3 and CI
Australia	Seven Network and CI
Russia	TV Network
United States	Fox Reality
Sweden	TV4 Fakta and TV4 Sport
Finland	MTV3 Fakta in Finland
Estonia	TV6
Denmark	Canal 9
Latvia	TV5 Riga
Belgium	2BE

Notes:

1. ^1 Broadcast under the name 'De Politie Op Je Hielen

== See also ==
- Police Interceptors a show following police in Essex and South Yorkshire, and made by the same producers as Road Wars.
- Traffic Cops, (sometimes listed as Motorway Cops and Car Wars) a similar programme now shown on Channel 5.
- Brit Cops, similar police documentary on Sky Livingit.
- Police Stop!, a show from the 1990s showing footage from police car dashboard cameras, with occasional presenter links.
- Police Camera Action!, a similar programme on ITV.
- Street Crime UK, a similar programme shown on Bravo.
