= ProVida =

Series of traffic surveillance systems

ProVida is a series of mobile surveillance and speed limit enforcement systems produced by UK-based Petards Group. It was originally developed in 1986 by Danish company JAI A/S. Its first user was Rigspolitiet Denmark, the Danish national police force, followed by the Metropolitan Police in the United Kingdom, who first installed ProVida cameras on two patrol vehicles for use on the M25 motorway. Today ProVida recordings are accepted as evidential proof in various jurisdictions including the United Kingdom.

The latest iteration of the system, ProVida 4000, is available in more than ten languages. It consists of four components:

- ProVida Surveillance
- ProVida Speed Measurement
- ProVida Mobile ANPR
- Specialist Cameras

== Details of the user interface ==
There are several international variants for the "SPEED" counter on the camera:

- SPEED - United Kingdom, Poland, The Netherlands
- EGEN HASTIGHED - Denmark, Norway, Sweden - from the Danish word egen hastighed meaning "own speed"
- GESCHW - Germany - from the German word Geschwindigkeit meaning "speed", abbreviated to GESCHW.

=== Versions ===
Early versions had the following display:

PP SPEED
000.00 Mph

The other variants were:

PP SPEED
0.00 Mph

and from 1994 onwards

PP SPEED
0.00 m.p.h.
SPEED
000 m.p.h.

In 1996, a new version was launched, and this was in the format of

v: 0.00mph
o: 0mph

By 1997, the screen was in a new format of:

s: 0.00mph
o: 0mph

the "v" and "s" represent "vehicle" and "speed", literally.

Foreign versions of the above were:

h: 0.00km/t
o: 0km/t

where "h" is "egen hastighed", literally "own speed" in Danish.
