= Central Motorway Police Group =

Police service in West Midlands, England

- Abbreviation: CMPG

Agency overview
- Formed: 1990
- Dissolved: September 2024

Jurisdictional structure
- Operations jurisdiction: Staffordshire and the West Midlands, England, UK
- Legal jurisdiction: England & Wales
- General nature: Local civilian police
- Specialist jurisdiction: Highways, roads, traffic

Operational structure
- Headquarters: Perry Barr
- Constables: 149
- Unsworn members: 29
- Parent agencies: Staffordshire Police and West Midlands Police

Facilities
- Patrol Bases: 3
- Patrol cars: 46

The Central Motorway Police Group (CMPG) was a co-operative operation between two police forces in the West Midlands of England. The department ceased operations in September 2024, when the jurisdiction of each area returned to the home force.

Officers from the two forces involved – Staffordshire Police, and West Midlands Police – provided a dedicated policing service on several hundred miles of the motorway network in the Staffordshire and West Midlands police areas. Previously the group also included West Mercia Police and Warwickshire Police.

The radio control room was based at Quinton working with National Highways, and the central vehicle depot was located adjacent to the M6 at Perry Barr in Birmingham where Thornbridge Avenue passes under the motorway. (Note: CMPG Headquarters: 52.533536°N 1.901858°W) The depot had direct access onto both the northbound and southbound carriageways of the motorway, allowing police vehicles to respond faster to incidents. It also had access to local roads.

In June 2008, police forces in North West England established the North West Motorway Police Group covering the motorways in their respective areas following the success of the CMPG.

== History ==
The CMPG was first formed in 1990, when West Mercia Constabulary, now known as West Mercia Police, and West Midlands Police formed a partnership to police approximately 100 miles (160 km) of motorway in Birmingham, the West Midlands and North Worcestershire. Staffordshire Police and Warwickshire Police joined the partnership in 2001, bringing the motorway sections in those counties within the Group's area of responsibility, while West Mercia increased its input.

Warwickshire withdrew from the CMPG in April 2007 and West Mercia announced their intention to withdraw in July 2017, partly due to the Strategic Alliance they have with Warwickshire. West Mercia Police withdrew from CMPG in April 2018.

== See also ==
- Road Policing Unit
