= Street Wars (TV series) =

- Also known as: Street Law
- Created by: Bill Rudgard; Steve Warr
- No. of episodes: 15

Production
- Producer: Raw Cut TV
- Production locations: Kent, Surrey and Northern Ireland

Original release
- Network: Sky1
- Release: 2005

Related
- Road Wars

Street Wars (sometimes named Street Law) was a police reality television programme produced by Raw Cut TV for British Sky Broadcasting and broadcast on Sky1. A spin-off of Road Wars, Street Wars began in 2005 and followed the Tactical Team from Kent Police in Medway, Kent and the Tactical Support Group from the Police Service of Northern Ireland in Derry, Northern Ireland. The programme also followed Surrey Police for a short while around Guildford, Surrey. The footage from the two teams is combined with video footage from CCTV cameras and police forces from around the world. The series is narrated by Lee Boardman. There are 15 editions of approximately 46 minutes each.
