= Real Lives (TV channel) =

British pay television channel, 2004–2019

- Final logo, until closure on October 1, 2019

Programming
- Picture format: 16:9 576i SDTV
- Timeshift service: Real Lives +1

Ownership
- Owner: Sky
- Sister channels: List of Sky UK channels

History
- Launched: 13 December 2004
- Closed: 1 October 2019
- Replaced by: Sky Crime
- Former names: LIVINGtv2 (2004–2007); Living2 (2007–2009); LivingIt (2009–2011); Sky LIVINGit (2011–2015)

Links
- Website: sky.com/skyliving

Real Lives was a British pay television channel owned by Sky, a division of Comcast. It used to be the sister channel of Sky Living. It was originally known as LIVINGtv2 from the channel's launch in 2004 until 2007, and then was known as Living2 from 2007 to 2009.

On 1 October 2019, Real Lives closed down after 15 years and was replaced by Sky Crime.

== History ==
The channel launched on 13 December 2004 as LIVINGtv2 on Sky Digital and Telewest.

The channel mainly showed highlights of programming from the main channel, along with extended coverage of its reality programmes, such as I'm Famous and Frightened Extra! and Most Haunted Live!. However, the channel has gained the American reality TV series, The Amazing Race. The channel has also shown more lifestyle and health related programmes such as Baby ER, Birth Stories, Downsize Me! and Wedding SOS.

Every morning from 10 am to 12 pm, there used to be a programming slot called Baby Zone, in which programmes related to pregnancy and birth were shown. Programmes included Birth Days, Maternity Ward and Babies: Special Delivery.

As of 2018, most of the programmes on the channel are repeats of factual programmes that are also on Pick.

A one-hour timeshift version of the channel launched on 5 February 2009, replacing Trouble's one-hour timeshift, Trouble +1.

Living2 was rebranded as Livingit on 30 November 2009, following problems making viewers understand that the channel is not a timeshifted version of the main channel. The relaunch was accompanied by new programming under the strapline "Life's worth watching".

It was announced on 25 October 2010 that Living would be rebranded as Sky Living in early 2011 and move electronic programming guide (EPG) positions on Sky from channel 112 to 107 after Sky One and before Sky Atlantic. As part of the move, Livingit was rebranded as Sky Livingit.

Upon the launch of the now defunct drama channel ITV Encore, on 3 June 2014, it moved to EPG slot 222 on Sky, and Sky Livingit +1, whose EPG number was replaced by Sky Arts 1 HD (SD on HD viewing) moving to slot 223.

On 9 June 2015, Sky Livingit was rebranded as Real Lives, moving to slot 172 on Sky.

== Closure ==
On 1 October 2019, Real Lives ceased broadcasting in the opening hours of 6:00am and was replaced by Sky Crime, which later moved up to its current slot on Sky channel 122.
