= 2008 in British television =

This is a list of events that took place in 2008 related to British television.

== Events ==
=== January ===
Date	Event
2 January	ITV announces that it will move its Sunday episodes of Emmerdale and Coronation Street. From the week beginning on 12 January, Coronation Street will have an additional Friday episode, while Emmerdale will air for an hour on Tuesdays. Dancing on Ice would move to a Sunday night slot.
11 January	ITV News at 10.30 is shown for the last time. News at Ten then replaces it from Mondays to Thursdays, and ITV Late News on Fridays.
14 January	News at Ten returns to ITV with Sir Trevor McDonald and Julie Etchingham. The programme will air four nights a week from Mondays to Thursdays, with an 11.00pm bulletin on Fridays.
16 January	Actress Leslie Ash wins a record £5 million out of court settlement from Chelsea and Westminster NHS Trust after contracting a hospital acquired bug that left her partially paralysed while undergoing hospital treatment in 2004.
22 January	BBC Three has its identity relaunched, showcasing new shows such as Lily Allen and Friends.
23 January	Konnie Huq presents her last episode of Blue Peter after over ten years, having become the longest-running female presenter and third longest-running overall in the shows' 50-year history.
31 January	"Pretty Baby....", a unique episode of the soap opera EastEnders is broadcast, consisting of just one character (Dot Cotton) with a single monologue in the form of a taped message to her husband. This 'one-hander' is a first in UK soap history.
31 January	All the UKTV network channels such as UKTV Gold switch to widescreen.

=== February ===
Date	Event
6 February	The BBC announces that children's drama Grange Hill is to be axed after exactly 30 years on air.
7 February	In an address to the Royal Television Society, the comedian Lenny Henry criticises the lack of ethnic diversity in the media.
7 February	BBC One airs the debut episode of Ashes to Ashes, a spin-off series of Life on Mars.
8 February	After 22 years Neighbours is shown on BBC One for the last time.
11 February	Australian soap opera Neighbours debuts in its new home on Five.
12 February	The BBC Three "Blobs" are played out for the last time at 4 am. A new set of idents debuted the same day, this is the channels first ever rebrand since launching in early 2003.
14 February	The Big Bang Theory debuts on Channel 4.
18 February	Natasha Kaplinsky makes her Five News debut as Britain's highest paid newsreader, on a reported annual salary of £1 million.
18 February	Carrie and David's Popshop debuts on CBeebies.
20 February	It is announced that music video channel The Hits will be replaced by 4Music later in the year.
25 February	BBC One soap EastEnders is reprimanded by Ofcom for the level of violence in an episode aired in November 2007 which saw a gang attack on a pub. The scenes, which showed a sustained level of violence, were deemed to be inappropriate for a pre-watershed audience.
25 February	The Mr. Men Show debuts on Five.
27 February	Launch of the black entertainment channel BET International.
28 February	James Nathan wins the 2008 series of MasterChef.

=== March ===
Date	Event
3 March	Christ Church, Oxford wins the 2007–08 series of University Challenge, beating the University of Sheffield 220–170.
7 March	The MS Society criticises a recent The Bill plotline as "grossly irresponsible" after it featured a multiple sclerosis patient being told about a fictional treatment for the condition.
10 March	A blanket ban on filming in and around Stormont Castle is lifted when the restrictions on the presence of cameras in the building are lifted, thus allowing proceedings in the Northern Ireland Assembly to be televised.
10 March	ITV2 signs a deal with social networking site Bebo, allowing some of the channel's content to be aired free online.
12 March	Overnight viewing figures indicate that the debut episode of the US TV series Bionic Woman, which aired on ITV2 on 11 March was watched by 2.2 million viewers, giving the channel its largest audience to date.
15 March	Launch of BBC One's I'd Do Anything, a search for actors to appear in the West End musical Oliver!. Three boys will be chosen to play Oliver Twist and an actress to play the role of Nancy.
16 March	Suzanne Shaw and skating partner Matt Evers win the third series of Dancing on Ice.
19 March	BBC Four attracts its highest ever ratings after broadcasting the one-off drama The Curse of Steptoe, with 1.41 million viewers.
21 March	Dirty Sexy Money makes its debut airing in the UK and proves to be a popular hit for Channel 4.
22 March	ITV1 airs the Network television premiere of the 2005 musical film Charlie and the Chocolate Factory.
24 March (Easter Monday)	BBC Four broadcasts a revived, special two-hour-long episode of the 1960s satire The Frost Report.
26 March	American Hit Dramedy, Desperate Housewives finally makes its Fourth season debut. The show was due to start in the first two weeks of January, but this was shelved due to the WGA Strike.

=== April ===
Date	Event
1 April	Patsy Palmer returns to EastEnders as Bianca Jackson nine years after leaving the series.
15 April	ITV has decided to drop the second episode of the nine-part US supernatural drama Pushing Daisies because it only has scheduling space to show eight episodes before the start of Euro 2008. The second episode was the only one considered not crucial to the storyline, but it will be shown when the series is repeated.
21 April	BBC News has a major relaunch with BBC News 24 becoming BBC News and BBC World becoming BBC World News. All the news programmes on BBC One and BBC Two have also had new looks including all regional news programmes.
26 April	A report in The Sun suggests seven characters will be axed from Coronation Street over the coming months. Those leaving include five members of the Morton family, who run the street's kebab shop, and Jack Ellis and Matthew Crompton, who play father and son bookies Harry and Dan Mason.
28 April	Five Life is renamed to Fiver.

=== May ===
Date	Event
1 May	VH1 takes on a general entertainment focus, matching the American network, though due to the American VH1's programmes being licensed to other networks or broadcasters, it also carries content from Channel 5 and MTV. VH1 completes its transition to a general entertainment format in October 2018, though music programmes continue in non-prime timeslots.
6 May	Freesat officially launches. ITV HD launches its full service.
19 May	Kix! was launched in the UK for the first time.
20 May	In a press release, the BBC announce that Russell T Davies is resigning as head writer and executive producer on Doctor Who following the fourth series, the 2008 Christmas special and a series of four hour-long episodes in 2009, after which he will be replaced by fellow writer Steven Moffat.
22 May	Scotsport airs for the last time on Scottish television. By the time it ended it was recognised as the world's longest running sports television magazine.
24 May	After Britain's entry in the 2008 Eurovision Song Contest comes last, Sir Terry Wogan suggests he may step down as the BBC's Eurovision commentator because the contest is "no longer a music contest". Andy Abraham receives 14 points for the United Kingdom with "Even If", while the contest is won by Russia's Dima Bilan with "Believe", which scores 272 points. The result is partially due to the number of former Soviet states giving Russia the maximum 12 points, prompting Wogan to tell viewers that "Russia were going to be the political winners from the beginning" and to suggest "western European participants have to decide whether they want to take part from here on in because their prospects are poor".
29 May	It is announced that What the Papers Say, the second longest running programme on British television after Panorama, is to be axed by the BBC.
30 May	Several newspapers report that George Galloway, MP has issued legal proceedings against The Bill for defamation after a storyline aired in November 2007 that featured a corrupt MP who smuggled antiques out of Iraq before the war, which Galloway alleges was a portrayal of him.
30 May	ITV airs the 5000th episode of Emmerdale.
31 May	Jodie Prenger will play the role of Nancy in the West End musical Oliver! after winning BBC One's I'd Do Anything.
31 May	Break dancer George Sampson wins the second series of Britain's Got Talent, netting a £100,000 prize and a chance to perform at the Royal Variety Performance.

=== June ===
Date	Event
3 June	All Virgin Media channels including Bravo (also Bravo 2), Living (also Living2), Challenge, Trouble and Virgin 1 switch to widescreen.
4 June	MTV UK and several other MTV Networks Europe channels are fined £255,000 by Ofcom for "widespread and persistent" breaches of the broadcasting code, including breaking the pre-watershed content ban.
5 June	The Big Brother 9 launch night proves to be not as good as Channel 4 had hoped with the loss of around 1 million viewers who had watched the previous year's launch night
6 June	Sharon Osbourne quits as a judge on the ITV series The X Factor shortly before filming is due to begin on a new series.
7–29 June	Euro 2008 are held in Austria and Switzerland.
9 June	Channel 4 apologises after broadcasting an episode of The Simpsons that included the use of the word "wankers" at 6.00 pm on 15 April. The incident, blamed on an administrative error, led to 31 viewers complaining to Ofcom that such language was unacceptable at a time when children would be watching.
10 June	Girls Aloud singer Cheryl Cole is revealed as Sharon Osbourne's replacement as a judge on The X Factor.
11 June	Lee McQueen wins the fourth series of The Apprentice.
11 June	UKTV announces that, following the successful launch of Dave, it will rebrand all its channels from generic, UKTV-prefixed names to individual and separate brands.
17 June	Comedian Joan Rivers is asked to leave the ITV afternoon talk show Loose Women after swearing live on air. She was removed during the commercial break, and said that she didn't realise the show was going out live and thought her comments would be bleeped.
23 June	An EastEnders storyline involving the live burial of a character that aired over Easter is criticised as "offensive" by Ofcom. The scenes, which saw Tanya Branning getting revenge against her unfaithful husband Max by drugging and burying him, attracted 116 complaints from viewers. Ofcom says the episodes had "a seriously disturbing element to them".

=== July ===
Date	Event
5 July	The finale of the fourth series of Doctor Who is watched by 9.4 million viewers, this is the first time since the series' revival in 2005 that Doctor Who has the largest audience share in its timeslot.
7 July	Alex Evans wins Cycle 4 of Britain's Next Top Model.
15 July	ITV Central is fined £25,000 for contempt of court after running a news story about a trial that was about to start, which included details of a defendant's previous conviction for murder.
15 July	More4 begins a season of Stanley Kubrick films. It is preceded by Citizen Kubrick, a documentary about the director by Jon Ronson. By way of promotion for the season, Channel 4 commissioned a 65-second promotion that included recreating the set of The Shining, complete with lookalikes of the cast and crew, the ad showing the set from Kubrick's perspective as he walks through it to take his seat in the director's chair before filming.
22 July	BBC Two Controller Roly Keating is appointed as the BBC's first director of archive content. He will take up the role in the autumn.
23 July	Des O'Connor announces that he will step down as presenter of Countdown.
23 July	Portland Enterprises, owners of Television X: The Fantasy Channel are fined £25,000 by Ofcom for broadcasting "highly explicit sex material" after showing an R18 rated adult film in June 2007, something that broke Ofcom rules on the broadcast of adult content.
23 July	Former Spice Girl Emma Bunton is named as a temporary co-presenter of Richard & Judy, presenting the show alongside Richard Madeley for a few days while his wife, Judy Finnigan recovers from a knee operation. Bunton is succeeded by Myleene Klass, who also takes on Finnegan's role for a few days.
25 July	Carol Vorderman announces that she will quit as host of Countdown, two days after Des O'Connor announced his intention to leave the programme. Vorderman's manager said that she did not think she could go through the process of bonding with another co-presenter.
25 July	Liz McClarnon wins the 2008 series of Celebrity MasterChef.

=== August ===
Date	Event
8–24 August	2008 Summer Olympics are held in China.
15 August	The music video channel The Hits closes and is replaced by 4Music later the same day.
15 August	Griff Rhys Jones announced as the new presenter of It'll Be Alright on the Night for the first time since Denis Norden's retirement from the show in 2006 after almost 30 years.
22 August	After seven years with Channel 4, Richard Madeley and Judy Finnigan present their last edition of Richard & Judy. They move to new subscription channel Watch in the Autumn.
31 August	Sky One, Sky Two and Sky Three rebrands to Sky1, Sky2 and Sky3 respectively.
31 August	In an interview with BBC Radio 5 Live's Simon Mayo, television writer Jimmy McGovern describes the BBC as "one of the most racist institutions in England" because of the lack of ethnic people in prominent positions. The BBC responds by saying it is "actively seeking and nurturing ethnic talents both on and off the air."

=== September ===
Date	Event
1 September	Selina Scott is suing Five for age discrimination, it is reported, after she was considered but overlooked as a temporary replacement for Five News presenter Natasha Kaplinsky during her maternity leave.
5 September	Rachel Rice wins series nine of Big Brother.
8 September	A report by the Scottish Broadcasting Commission recommends that up to £75 million of public funds should be used to create a high quality Scottish television channel.
15 September	BBC One airs the final episode of Grange Hill.
18 September	BBC One screens its controversial documentary The Undercover Soldier that alleges instances of bullying in the British Army. The show attracts relatively low ratings and the BBC is criticised by serving soldiers for the way the investigation was conducted.
19 September	BBC Alba, a Scottish Gaelic language digital television channel, is launched through a partnership between the BBC and MG Alba.
19 September	Derek Johnstone wins the first series of MasterChef: The Professionals, and goes on to take a job at London's Le Gavroche restaurant with Michel Roux Jr.

=== October ===
Date	Event
1 October	BBC Four Controller Janice Hadlow is appointed Controller of BBC Two, replacing outgoing incumbent Roly Keating from November.
1 October	Scottish Media Group is rebranded STV Group plc. It does this because it wants to highlight its renewed focus on television.
1 October	ITV1 screens the British terrestrial television premiere of Harry Potter and the Goblet of Fire, with overnight viewing figures indicating it to have an audience of 7.2 million viewers (a 29% audience share).
6 October	Five has its first major rebrand since 2002.
6 October	It is reported that an episode of Coronation Street, in which the character Tony Gordon made a jibe about Rangers, was changed following complaints from fans of the football club.
7 October	UKTV launches a new general entertainment channel called Watch; UKTV Gold is relaunched as comedy channel G.O.L.D. (Go on Laugh Daily); and UKTV Drama is relaunched as crime drama channel Alibi.
7 October	Richard Madeley and Judy Finnigan begin presenting a new show Richard and Judy's New Position on Watch.
10 October	EastEnders begins broadcasting the storyline The Secret Mitchell in which Danielle Jones (Lauren Crace) is revealed to be Ronnie Mitchell's (Samantha Janus) daughter.
16 October	Longest-running children's television programme Blue Peter celebrates its 50th birthday.
23 October	BBC One airs the 1000th edition of Question Time.
29 October	During the live broadcast of the 2008 National Television Awards, David Tennant announces that he is quitting Doctor Who at the end of 2009.
30 October	Following his involvement in The Russell Brand Show prank telephone calls row, Jonathan Ross is suspended for 12 weeks without pay from all BBC shows, including his television programmes such as Friday Night with Jonathan Ross. He also decides not to host the 2008 British Comedy Awards, broadcast on ITV.

=== November ===
Date	Event
2 November	F1 on ITV airs for the last time, presented by Steve Rider, with commentators Martin Brundle and James Allen.
3 November	Britain's favourite singing pigs Pinky and Perky return to CBBC with a brand new television series known as The Pinky and Perky Show brought to life with CGI animation. The series is updated with various brand new characters and a few old characters which were Morton Frog and Vera Vixen (but this time as the main antagonist) and follows the brothers and their misadventures in a television studio while working as presenters of a children's TV show.
4 November	It is announced that an agreement has been struck for Sky's basic channels – including Sky1, Sky2, Sky3, Sky News, Sky Sports News, Sky Arts 1, Sky Arts 2, Sky Real Lives and Sky Real Lives 2 – to return to Virgin Media from 13 November 2008 until 12 June 2011. In exchange Sky will be provide continued carriage of Virgin Media Television's channels – Living, Living2, Bravo, Bravo +1, Trouble, Challenge and Virgin1 for the same period. However, Trouble closed down in April 2009 and Sky brought Virgin Media Television (later Living TV Group) two years later. Bravo, Bravo 2, Challenge Jackpot and Channel One closed down on 1 January and 1 February 2011 respectively, along with the rebrandings of Living (now Sky Living), Livingit (then Livingit, now Sky Livingit), Living Loves (now Sky Living Loves) and Challenge's new slot on Freeview on 1 February 2011, which finally ended Living TV Group and extended the agreement as a permanent deal.
5 November	A BBC Two Newsnight special on the election of Barack Obama in which presenter Jeremy Paxman famously addresses the rapper Dizzee Rascal as "Mr Rascal".
6 November	The digital switchover continues when the Scottish Borders region's analogue service is switched off. People served by the Selkirk transmitter will be the first substantial area to go fully digital.
12–13 November	ITV airs Proof of Life, a two-part episode of The Bill to celebrate the series' 25th anniversary. The storyline features a crossover with the German police procedural Leipzig Homicide, and is aired on both UK and German television.
13 November	BSkyB's basic channels such as Sky1 and Sky News return to Virgin Media TV.
13 November	Debut of the six-part supernatural drama Apparitions on BBC One is about a Roman Catholic Church priest Father Jacob Myers (Martin Shaw) who examines evidence of miracles to be used in canonisation but also performs exorcisms. As he learns, Jacob's duties run deeper than just sending demons back to Hell; he later must prevent them all from escaping. The series continues on 18 December.
14 November	Children in Need 2008 is broadcast on BBC One, hosted by Terry Wogan, Tess Daly and Fearne Cotton. Raising £20,991,216 by the end of the broadcast.
19 November	Journalist John Sergeant pulls out of BBC One's Strictly Come Dancing contest following controversy over his participation in the show. Sergeant has been consistently supported by the public despite receiving the lowest scores from the programme's panel of judges. Announcing his decision, Sergeant says winning would be "a joke too far". The BBC says it will refund anyone who voted for Sergeant while he was taking part.
20 November	Sir Trevor McDonald presents his last News at Ten after only 11 months at helm. Mark Austin takes over as head anchor.
20 November	QI broadcasts its last episode to be originally shown on BBC Two, as part of Children in Need. The series moves to BBC One during Christmas.
21 November	It is announced that Sky Sports presenter Jeff Stelling and Oxford graduate Rachel Riley will replace Des O'Connor and Carol Vorderman as hosts of the next series of Countdown. Riley beat 1,000 applicants to win the role.
21 November	The BBC Trust criticises another incident involving Jonathan Ross and bad language. The Trust rules that a remark made by Ross on an edition of Friday Night with Jonathan Ross aired in May in which he told the actress Gwyneth Paltrow he "would fuck her" was "gratuitous and unnecessarily offensive".
21 November	STV announces its intention to opt out of ITV programmes they claim are not performing well in their broadcast region. These include series such as Sharpe's Peril, Al Murray's Happy Hour, Moving Wallpaper, Benidorm and The Alan Titchmarsh Show. ITV's coverage of the FA Cup is also dropped.

=== December ===
Date	Event
3 December	The new Wallace and Gromit adventure, A Matter of Loaf and Death, premieres in Australia on the ABC before airing in the UK.
5 December	Selina Scott has reached a settlement with Five after suing the channel for age discrimination, it is reported.
5 December	Actor Joe Swash wins the eighth series of I'm a Celebrity...Get Me Out of Here!.
5 December	It is announced that Graham Norton will take over from Terry Wogan as the presenter of the Eurovision Song Contest after Wogan, who has presented the BBC's coverage of the contest for 30 years, decided to relinquish the role.
12 December	Des O'Connor presents his last Countdown episode after over a year of presenting and Carol Vorderman also presents her last Countdown episode after 26 years of co-presenting.
13 December	Alexandra Burke wins the fifth series of The X Factor.
14 December	Cyclist Chris Hoy is named as this year's BBC Sports Personality of the Year.
18 December	Presenter Fiona Phillips leaves GMTV after nearly 16 years with ITV's breakfast broadcaster.
20 December	Tom Chambers and dancing partner Camilla Dallerup win the sixth series of Strictly Come Dancing.
25 December	The Royle Family returns for a Christmas Special, attracting an audience of 11 million. The most watched show of the day is a new Wallace and Gromit adventure, A Matter of Loaf and Death, which airs on BBC One, and is seen by 14.4 million viewers.
30 December	Shooting Stars returns with a Christmas special and a clip show, the first new episodes since 2002 and Rab C. Nesbitt returns with a Christmas special, another new episode since 1999.
31 December	ITV airs Elton's New Year's Eve party, a live concert by Elton John from London's O2 Arena. Channel 5 airs an evening of programming dedicated to Bruce Forsyth, including An Audience with Bruce Forsyth.
31 December	The 1968 musical film Chitty Chitty Bang Bang is aired on ITV1 again.

== Debuts ==
=== BBC One ===
- 1 January – Sense and Sensibility
- 5 January –
  - Basil's Swap Shop
  - The One and Only
- 8 January – Mistresses
- 10 January – Fairy Tales
- 13 January – Lark Rise to Candleford
- 4 February – Frankenstein's Cat
- 7 February – Ashes to Ashes
- 17 February – The Last Enemy
- 10 March – Put Your Money Where Your Mouth Is
- 15 March – I'd Do Anything
- 28 March – The Passion
- 12 April – The Kids Are All Right
- 28 April – Out of the Blue
- 1 May – The Invisibles
- 30 June – Criminal Justice
- 5 July – Last Choir Standing
- 8 July – Bonekickers
- 30 July – Lost Land of the Jaguar
- 10 August – Britain From Above
- 26 August – Mutual Friends
- 11 September – The Planners Are Coming
- 14 September – Tess of the D'Urbervilles
- 18 September – The Undercover Soldier
- 20 September –
  - Merlin
  - Hole in the Wall
- 7 October Sunshine
- 12 October – Stephen Fry in America
- 19 October – Ian Fleming: Where Bond Began
- 24 October – Little Dorrit
- 3 November – The Pinky and Perky Show
- 13 November – Apparitions
- 23 November – Survivors
- 30 November – Wallander
- 25 December – A Matter of Loaf and Death

=== BBC Two ===
Date	Programme
10 January	Never Better
11 February	Get Squiggling
28 February	Empty
4 March	Mad Men
10 March	10 Days to War
10 March	White Girl
11 May	Wild China
28 May	Filth: The Mary Whitehouse Story
10 July	Lab Rats
19 July	Help! Teach is Coming to Stay
30 July	House of Saddam
12 August	Sesame Tree
29 September	Chuggington
2 October	Beautiful People
10 October	The American Future: A History
22 November	Einstein and Eddington

=== BBC Three ===
Date	Programme
12 February	Lily Allen and Friends
12 February	Phoo Action
31 March	Dis/Connected
8 April	The Wall
22 June	MeeBOX
23 June	Snog Marry Avoid?
10 August	Spooks: Code 9
28 August	The Wrong Door

=== BBC Four ===
Date	Programme
31 January	Art of Spain
17 March	The Curse of Steptoe
2 April	Hughie Green, Most Sincerely
12 June	The Long Walk to Finchley
21 August	Fossil Detectives
15 September	Only Connect

=== ITV (1/2/3/4/CITV) ===
Date	Programme
9 January	Honest
10 January	Moving Wallpaper
10 January	Echo Beach
12 January	Thank God You're Here
14 January	The Palace
4 March	Bike Squad
5 March	Rock Rivals
12 March	Bionic Woman
14 March	The Passions of Girls Aloud
23 March	He Kills Coppers
28 March	Teenage Kicks
6 April	Headcases
20 April	Beat the Star
8 May	Midnight Man
4 June	Bingo Night Live
28 June	Who Dares, Sings!
1 September	The Children
1 September	My Goldfish Is Evil
3 September	Lost in Austen
18 September	No Heroics
22 September	A Place of Execution
13 October	Wired
26 October	Britannia High

=== Channel 4 ===
Date	Programme
2 January	The Triple Nipple Club
14 January	City of Vice
18 January	Gordon Ramsay: Cookalong Live
22 January	Supersize vs Superskinny
1 February	Alan Carr's Celebrity Ding Dong
22 February	New Hero of Comedy
31 March	Poppy Shakespeare
1 June	Tony Robinson's Crime and Punishment
10 July	Dexter
1 August	The Kevin Bishop Show
1 August	Tonightly
24 August	Stacked
25 August	Wogan's Perfect Recall
17 September	The Family
30 September	Jamie's Ministry of Food
30 September	Dawn Porter: Extreme Wife
12 October	Britain's Got the Pop Factor and Possibly a New Celebrity Jesus Christ Soapstar Superstar Strictly on Ice
19 November	The Devil's Whore
24 November	The Ascent of Money

=== Five ===
Date	Programme
25 February	The Mr. Men Show
13 August	Rory and Paddy's Great British Adventure
5 September	The What in the World? Quiz
8 October	Paul Merton in India

=== E4 ===
Date	Programme
3 January	Big Brother: Celebrity Hijack
14 February	The Big Bang Theory
1 May	The Inbetweeners
27 October	Dead Set
24 November	Hollyoaks Later

=== Sky1 ===
Date	Programme
21 January	Ross Kemp in Afghanistan
11 May	Don't Forget the Lyrics!
31 August	Hairspray: The School Musical

=== Watch ===
Date	Programme
7 October	Richard and Judy's New Position

=== Dave ===
Date	Programme
27 October	Argumental
30 October	Batteries Not Included

=== FX ===
Date	Programme
6 May	The Colbert Report

=== Other channels ===
Date	Debut	Network
4 February	Phineas and Ferb	Disney Channel
8 March	iCarly	Nickelodeon
24 March	Chowder	Cartoon Network
3 November	Hi-5	Cartoonito

== Channels ==
=== New channels ===
Date	Channel
1 February	MTV One +1
17 March	Sky Sports HD 3
20 March	Sky Movies Premiere HD
28 April	FX HD
19 May	Kix!
9 July	AAP TV
15 August	4Music
18 August	Nicktoonsters
7 October	Watch
7 October	Watch +1
5 November	Crime & Investigation Network HD
1 December	Disney Cinemagic HD
16 December	MTVNHD

=== Defunct channels ===
Date	Channel
1 February	MTV Flux
15 August	The Hits

=== Rebranding channels ===
Date	Old Name	New Name
21 April	BBC News 24	BBC News
28 April	Five Life	Fiver
31 August	Sky One	Sky1
31 August	Sky Two	Sky2
31 August	Sky Three	Sky3
7 October	UKTV Drama	Alibi
7 October	UKTV Drama +1	Alibi +1
7 October	UKTV Gold	G.O.L.D.
7 October	UKTV Gold +1	G.O.L.D. +1

== Television shows ==
=== Changes of network affiliation ===
Programme	Moved from	Moved to
American Dad! (First run rights)	BBC Three	FX
Little Miss Jocelyn	BBC Three	BBC Two
Gladiators	ITV1	Sky One
Take Your Pick	ITV1	Challenge
Small Talk	BBC One	Challenge
Wipeout	BBC One	Challenge
FA Cup football and England Internationals	BBC One	ITV1 & Setanta Sports
Neighbours	BBC One	Five
Fireman Sam	CBeebies	Five
Get 100	BBC Two	BBC One & CBBC
The Weakest Link (Daytime version)	BBC Two	BBC One
Out of the Blue	BBC Two	BBC One
QI	BBC Two	BBC One
Gavin & Stacey	BBC Three	BBC One
Torchwood	BBC Three	BBC Two
Robot Wars	Challenge	Bravo
Postman Pat	CBeebies	Five
It's Me or the Dog	Channel 4 & More4	Sky3 & Sky Real Lives
Yoko! Jakamoko! Toto!	CITV	CBeebies

- ^1 It later moved to CITV in early 2009 for a brand newer series and then in late 2012 back to Channel 5.

=== Returning this year after a break of one year or longer ===
Programme	Date(s) of original removal	Original channel	Date(s) of return	New channel(s)
ITV News at Ten	30 January 2004	ITV1	14 January 2008	N/A (Same channel as original)
Mr. and Mrs. as All Star Mr & Mrs	2 July 1999	ITV1	12 April 2008	N/A (Same channel as original)
Gladiators	1 January 2000	ITV1	11 May 2008	Sky1
Superstars	2005	BBC One	July 2008	Five
It'll Be Alright on the Night	18 March 2006	ITV1	20 September 2008	N/A (Same channel as original)
Going for Gold	9 July 1996	BBC One	13 October 2008	Five
Rab C. Nesbitt	18 June 1999	BBC Two	23 December 2008	N/A (Same channel as original)

== Continuing television shows ==
=== 1920s ===
Programme	Date
BBC Wimbledon	1927–1939, 1946–2019, 2021–present

=== 1930s ===
Programme	Date
Trooping the Colour	1937–1939, 1946–2019, 2023–present
The Boat Race	1938–1939, 1946–2019, 2021–present

=== 1950s ===
Programme	Date
Panorama	1953–present
The Sky at Night	1957–present
Blue Peter	1958–present

=== 1960s ===
Programme	Date
Coronation Street	1960–present
Songs of Praise	1961–present
Doctor Who	1963–1989, 1996, 2005–present
Match of the Day	1964–present
Top of the Pops	1964–present
The Frost Report	1966–1967, 2008
The Money Programme	1966–2010

=== 1970s ===
Programme	Date
Emmerdale	1972–present
Newsround	1972–present
Last of the Summer Wine	1973–2010
Arena	1975–present
One Man and His Dog	1976–present
Top Gear	1977–present
Ski Sunday	1978–present
Antiques Roadshow	1979–present
Question Time	1979–present

=== 1980s ===
Programme	Date
Children in Need	1980–present
Postman Pat	1981, 1991, 1994, 1996, 2004–2008
Timewatch	1982–present
The Bill	1984–2010
Channel 4 Racing	1984–2016
Thomas & Friends	1984–present
EastEnders	1985–present
Comic Relief	1985–present
Casualty	1986–present
Fireman Sam	1987–1994, 2005–2013
ChuckleVision	1987–2009
This Morning	1988–present
Rab C. Nesbitt	1988–1999, 2008–2014
The Simpsons	1989–present

=== 1990s ===
Programme	Date
Have I Got News for You	1990–present
Heartbeat	1992–2010
A Touch of Frost	1992–2010
The National Lottery Draws	1994–2017
Top of the Pops 2	1994–2017
Shooting Stars	1995–2002, 2008–2011
Hollyoaks	1995–present
Never Mind the Buzzcocks	1996–2015
Silent Witness	1996–present
Artur	1996–present
King of the Hill	1997–2010
South Park	1997–present
Midsomer Murders	1997–present
Who Wants to Be a Millionaire?	1998–2014
Bob the Builder	1998–present
Bremner, Bird and Fortune	1999–2010
British Soap Awards	1999–2019, 2022–present
Family Guy	1999–2002, 2005–present
SpongeBob SquarePants	1999–present
Holby City	1999–2022

=== 2000s ===
Programme	Date
The Weakest Link	2000–2012, 2017–present
Real Crime	2001–2011
I'm a Celebrity...Get Me Out of Here!	2002–present
Harry Hill's TV Burp	2002–2012
Spooks	2002–2011
River City	2002–2026
Comedy Connections	2003–2008
New Tricks	2003–2015
Daily Politics	2003–2018
Peep Show	2003–2015
Politics Show	2003–2011
QI	2003–present
The Royal	2003–2011
This Week	2003–2019
Doc Martin	2004–2022
Shameless	2004–2013
Strictly Come Dancing	2004–present
The X Factor	2004–2018
8 Out of 10 Cats	2005–present
The Apprentice	2005–present
Love Soup	2005–2008
Mock the Week	2005–2022
More4 News	2005–2009
The Jeremy Kyle Show	2005–2019
The Andrew Marr Show	2005–2021
Come Dine with Me	2005–present
Deal or No Deal	2005–2016
It's Me or the Dog	2005–2012
The Apprentice: You're Fired!	2006–present
Dancing on Ice	2006–present
Hotel Babylon	2006–2009
Lewis	2006–2015
Numberjacks	2006–2009
Robin Hood	2006–2009
The Slammer	2006–2015
That Mitchell and Webb Look	2006–2010
Ugly Betty	2006–2010
Torchwood	2006–2011
Waterloo Road	2006–2015
Star Stories	2006–2008
The Sarah Jane Adventures	2007–2011
After You've Gone	2007–2008
The Alan Titchmarsh Show	2007–2014
Jamie at Home	2007–2008
In the Night Garden...	2007–2009
Golden Balls	2007–2009
Gavin & Stacey	2007–2010
The Graham Norton Show	2007–present
Would I Lie to You?	2007–present
M.I. High	2007–2014
The Tudors	2007–2010
Trapped	2007–2010
Skins	2007–2013
Britain's Got Talent	2007–present

== Ending this year ==
Date	Programme	Channel(s)	Debut(s)
13 January	Sense and Sensibility	BBC	2008
8 February	Jamie at Home	Channel 4	2007
3 March	The Palace	ITV	2008
21 March	Echo Beach	ITV	2008
4 April	The Passions of Girls Aloud	ITV	2008
24 April	Charlie & Lola	BBC	2005
22 May	Scotsport	STV	1957
22 May	What the Papers Say	BBC	1956
5 June	HolbyBlue	BBC	2007
15 June	Headcases	ITV	2008
12 August	Bonekickers	BBC	2008
13 August	Lost Land of the Jaguar	BBC	2008
17 August	All Grown Up!	Nickelodeon	2003
22 August	Richard & Judy	Channel 4	2001
22 August	Tonightly	Channel 4	2008
30 August	Last Choir Standing	BBC	2008
15 September	Grange Hill	BBC	1978
15 September	The Children	ITV	2008
24 September	Lost in Austen	ITV	2008
30 September	Mutual Friends	BBC	2008
5 October	Tess of the D'Urbervilles	BBC	2008
6 October	A Place of Execution	ITV	2008
8 October	Supernanny	Channel 4	2004
9 October	Fossil Detectives	BBC	2008
20 October	Amazon	BBC	2008
21 October	Dawn Porter: Extreme Wife	Channel 4	2008
27 October	Wired	ITV	2008
8 November	Comedy Connections	BBC	2003
12 November	The Commander	ITV	2003
10 December	The Devil's Whore	Channel 4	2008
18 December	Apparitions	BBC	2008
20 December	Britannia High	ITV	2008
21 December	Northern Lights	ITV	2004
21 December	After You've Gone	BBC	2007
25 December	Out of the Blue	BBC	2008

== Deaths ==
Date	Name	Age	Cinematic Credibility
3 January	Natasha Collins	31	Presenter
3 January	Jack Aranson	83	Actor
5 January	Rowan Ayers	85	Television producer (Late Night Line-Up, Old Grey Whistle Test, Points of View)
17 January	Carole Lynne	89	Actress, widow of Baron Delfont
22 January	Diane Chenery-Wickens	48	Television make-up artist
22 January	Kevin Stoney	86	Actor
26 January	John Ardagh	79	Journalist and author
30 January	Jeremy Beadle	59	Presenter (Game for a Laugh, Beadle's About, Chain Letters, Beadle's Hotshots, You've Been Framed!)
30 January	Miles Kington	66	Presenter (Steam Days, Great Railway Journeys)
2 February	Barry Morse	89	Actor (The Fugitive, Space: 1999)
2 February	Edward Wilson	60	Actor (When the Boat Comes In) director of the National Youth Theatre
19 February	David Watkin	82	Cinematographer
19 February	Emily Perry	100	Actress
8 March	Carol Barnes	63	Former ITN newscaster
16 March	John Hewer	86	Actor
19 March	Paul Scofield	86	Actor
20 March	Brian Wilde	80	Actor (Last of the Summer Wine, Porridge)
25 March	Tony Church	77	Actor
27 March	Ronnie Letham	58	Actor
2 April	Sir Geoffrey Cox	97	Founder of ITN News at Ten
7 April	Mark Speight	42	Presenter (SMart, Scratchy & Co.)
10 April	Francis Coleman	84	Canadian-born British conductor, television producer and director
11 April	Willoughby Goddard	81	Actor
15 April	Hazel Court	82	Actress (The Masque of the Red Death, The Raven)
24 April	Tristram Cary	82	Film and television composer
25 April	Humphrey Lyttelton	86	Jazz musician, radio broadcaster (Host of I'm Sorry I Haven't a Clue)
1 May	Bernard Archard	91	Actor
1 May	Terry Duggan	76	Comedian and actor
13 May	Jill Adams	77	Actress
14 May	Frith Banbury	96	Stage director and actor
16 May	David Mitton	69	British TV animator/producer and director (Thunderbirds, Thomas & Friends, Tugs)
17 May	Wilfrid Mellers	94	Composer and author
17 May	John Fitzsimmons	68	Roman Catholic priest and broadcaster
20 May	Iona Banks	87	Actress
20 May	Margot Boyd	94	Actress (Marjorie Antrobus on The Archers)
23 May	Alan Brien	83	Journalist and critic
24 May	Rob Knox	18	Actor
24 May	Alan Towers	73	Journalist and television presenter (Midlands Today)
30 May	Chris Morgan	55	Journalist
30 May	Mike Scott	75	Television producer and presenter (The Time, The Place)
4 June	Jonathan Routh	80	Co-star (Candid Camera)
5 June	Angus Calder	66	Historian and writer
10 June	David Brierly	73	Actor (Voice of K-9 on Doctor Who)
26 June	Tony Melody	85	Actor
2 July	Elizabeth Spriggs	78	Stage, television and film actress (Sense and Sensibility, Harry Potter and the Philosopher's Stone)
3 July	Clive Hornby	63	Actor (Emmerdale) aka Jack Sugden
4 July	Charles Wheeler	85	Journalist and longest serving BBC foreign correspondent
7 July	Hugh Mendl	88	Record producer
14 July	Hugh Lloyd	85	Actor (Hancock's Half Hour)
14 July	Bryan Cowgill	81	Executive
27 July	Bob Crampsey	78	Sportscaster
30 July	Peter Coke	95	Actor and playwright (Paul Temple)
30 July	Jon Miller	87	Television presenter
6 August	Jennifer Hilary	65	Actress
7 August	Simon Gray	71	Playwright
10 August	Terence Rigby	71	Actor
10 August	John Esmonde	71	British scriptwriter (The Good Life)
11 August	Bill Cotton	80	BBC Television executive
18 August	Bob Humphrys	56	Sports presenter (BBC Cymru Wales), brother of John Humphrys
29 August	Geoffrey Perkins	55	Producer
31 August	Ken Campbell	66	Actor
8 September	Celia Gregory	58	Actress
19 September	David Jones	74	Theatre and film director
20 September	William Fox	97	Actor
1 October	Ian Collier	87	Actor and singer
4 October	Peter Vansittart	88	Writer
7 October	Peter Copley	93	Actor
8 October	Bob Friend	70	Sky News presenter
11 October	Mark Shivas	70	Film and television producer
11 October	Russ Hamilton	76	Singer
18 October	Peter Gordeno	69	Actor, singer and dancer
20 October	John Ringham	80	Actor
22 October	David Lloyd Meredith	74	Actor
25 October	John Axon	48	Actor
31 October	John Daly	71	Film producer
11 November	Jack Scott	85	BBC Weatherman
16 November	Reg Varney	92	Actor (On the Buses, The Rag Trade)
25 November	Dudley Savage	88	Radio presenter
8 December	Bob Spiers	63	Television director
8 December	Oliver Postgate	83	Animator
13 December	Kathy Staff	80	Actress (Last of the Summer Wine, Crossroads)
18 December	Jack Douglas	81	Actor

== Top 10 highest viewed programmes ==
Rank	Programme	Rating	Channel	Date
1	Wallace and Gromit: A Matter of Loaf and Death	16.15m	BBC One	25 December 2008
2	The X Factor Results	14.06m	ITV	13 December 2008
3	Britain's Got Talent: Final Result	13.88m	ITV	31 May 2008
4	The X Factor	13.77m	ITV	13 December 2008
5	Doctor Who	13.10m	BBC One	25 December 2008
6	Coronation Street	13.02m	ITV	18 January 2008
7	Strictly Come Dancing	12.97m	BBC One	20 December 2008
8	Dancing on Ice	12.02m	ITV	16 March 2008
9	Britain's Got Talent	11.86m	ITV	30 May 2008
10	EastEnders	11.73m	BBC One	24 March 2008

=== Notes ===
- A Matter of Loaf and Death is the highest viewed non-sporting event since an episode of Coronation Street in 2004 had 16.33 million.
- Coronation Street's audience was boosted due to the death of long running and popular character Vera Duckworth.
- The results shows of The X Factor and Britain's Got Talent are counted as separate programmes.

== See also ==
- 2008 in British music
- 2008 in British radio
- 2008 in the United Kingdom
- List of British films of 2008
