= English people =

Ethnic group native to England

Regions with significant populations
- England 37.2 million (2011)
- Significant English diaspora in
- United States: 46.6 million (2020)
- Australia: 8.4 million (2021)
- Canada: 6.3 million (2021)
- New Zealand: 2 million (2018)
- South Africa: 1.6 million (2011)

Languages
- English

Religion
- Christianity, traditionally Anglicanism, but also non-conformists and dissenters (see History of the Church of England); also Catholicism (see Catholic Emancipation); and other faiths (see Religion in England)

Related ethnic groups
- other British people; Irish

The English people are an ethnic group and nation native to England, who speak the English language, a West Germanic language, and share a common ancestry, history, and culture. The English identity began with the Anglo-Saxons, when they were known as the Angelcynn, meaning "Angle kin" or "English people". Their ethnonym is derived from the Angles, one of the Germanic peoples who settled in Britain around the 5th century AD.

The English largely descend from two main historical population groups: the West Germanic tribes, including the Angles, Saxons, and Jutes who settled in eastern and southern Britain following the withdrawal of the Western Roman Empire, and the Romano-British Brittonic speakers population who already lived there. Collectively known as the Anglo-Saxons, they founded what was to become the Kingdom of England by the 10th century, in response to the invasion and extensive settlement of Danes and other Norsemen that began in the late 9th century. This was followed by the Norman Conquest and limited settlement of Normans in England in the late 11th century and a sizeable number of French Protestants who emigrated between the 16th and 18th centuries. Some definitions of English people include, while others exclude, people descended from later migration into England.

England is the largest and most populated country of the United Kingdom. The majority of people living in England are British citizens. In the Acts of Union 1707, the Kingdom of England and the Kingdom of Scotland merged to become the Kingdom of Great Britain. Over the years, English customs and identity have become fairly closely aligned with British customs and identity in general. The demonyms for men and women from England are Englishman and Englishwoman.

== English nationality ==
England has had no devolved government of its own since 31 March 1707, as the English (and Scottish) Parliament became a unified Parliament of Great Britain on 1 May 1707 under the Acts of Union 1707.

The 1990s witnessed a rise in English self-awareness. This is linked to the expressions of national self-awareness of the other British nations of Wales, Scotland and, to some extent, Northern Ireland which take their most solid form in the new devolved political arrangements within the United Kingdom – and the waning of a shared British national identity with the growing distance between the end of the British Empire and the present.

Many recent immigrants to England have assumed a solely British identity, while others have developed dual or mixed identities. Use of the word "English" to describe Britons from ethnic minorities in England is complicated by most non-white people in England identifying as British rather than English. In their 2004 Annual Population Survey, the Office for National Statistics compared the ethnic identities of British people with their perceived national identity. They found that while 58% of white people in England described their nationality as "English", non-white people were more likely to describe themselves as "British". However, in the 2021 United Kingdom census, 58.4% of respondents identified as "British" instead of "English" to 14.9%.

Other ethnic groups in England are Bangladeshi 1.1%, Chinese 0.7%, Indian 3.1% Pakistani, 2.7%, Asian other, 1.6%, Black, Mixed, White: Gypsy or Irish Traveller 0.1%, Roma 0.2%, White Irish 0.9% and Arab 0.6%.

=== Relationship to Britishness ===
It is unclear how many British people consider themselves English. The words "English" and "British" are often incorrectly used interchangeably, especially outside the UK. In his study of English identity, Krishan Kumar describes a common slip of the tongue in which people say "English, I mean British". He notes that this slip is normally made only by the English themselves and by foreigners: "Non-English members of the United Kingdom rarely say 'British' when they mean 'English'". Kumar suggests that although this blurring is a sign of England's dominant position with the UK, it is also "problematic for the English [...] when it comes to conceiving of their national identity. It tells of the difficulty that most English people have of distinguishing themselves, in a collective way, from the other inhabitants of the British Isles".

In 1965, the historian A. J. P. Taylor wrote,

When the Oxford History of England was launched a generation ago, "England" was still an all-embracing word. It meant indiscriminately England and Wales; Great Britain; the United Kingdom; and even the British Empire. Foreigners used it as the name of a Great Power and indeed continue to do so. Bonar Law, by origin a Scotch Canadian, was not ashamed to describe himself as "Prime Minister of England" [...] Now terms have become more rigorous. The use of "England" except for a geographic area brings protests, especially from the Scotch.

However, although Taylor believed this blurring effect was dying out, in his book The Isles: A History (1999), Norman Davies lists numerous examples in history books of "British" still being used to mean "English" and vice versa.

In December 2010, Matthew Parris in The Spectator, analysing the use of "English" over "British", argued that English identity, rather than growing, had existed all along but has recently been unmasked from behind a veneer of Britishness.

== Historical and genetic origins ==
=== Replacement of Neolithic farmers by Bell Beaker populations ===
English people, like most Europeans, largely descend from three distinct lineages: Mesolithic hunter-gatherers, descended from a Cro-Magnon population that arrived in Europe about 45,000 years ago; Neolithic farmers who migrated from Anatolia during the Neolithic Revolution 9,000 years ago; and Yamnaya Steppe pastoralists who expanded into Europe from the Pontic–Caspian steppe in the context of Indo-European migrations 5,000 years ago.

Recent genetic studies have suggested that Britain's Neolithic population was largely replaced by a population from North Continental Europe characterised by the Bell Beaker culture around 2400 BC, associated with the Yamnaya people from the Pontic-Caspian Steppe. This population lacked genetic affinity to some other Bell Beaker populations, such as the Iberian Bell Beakers, but appeared to be an offshoot of the Corded Ware single grave people, as developed in Western Europe. It is currently unknown whether these Beaker peoples went on to develop Celtic languages in the British Isles, or whether later Celtic migrations introduced Celtic languages to Britain.

The close genetic affinity of these Beaker people to Continental North Europeans means that British and Irish populations cluster genetically very closely with other Northwest European populations, regardless of how much Anglo-Saxon and Viking ancestry was introduced during the 1st millennium AD.

=== Anglo-Saxons, Vikings and Normans ===
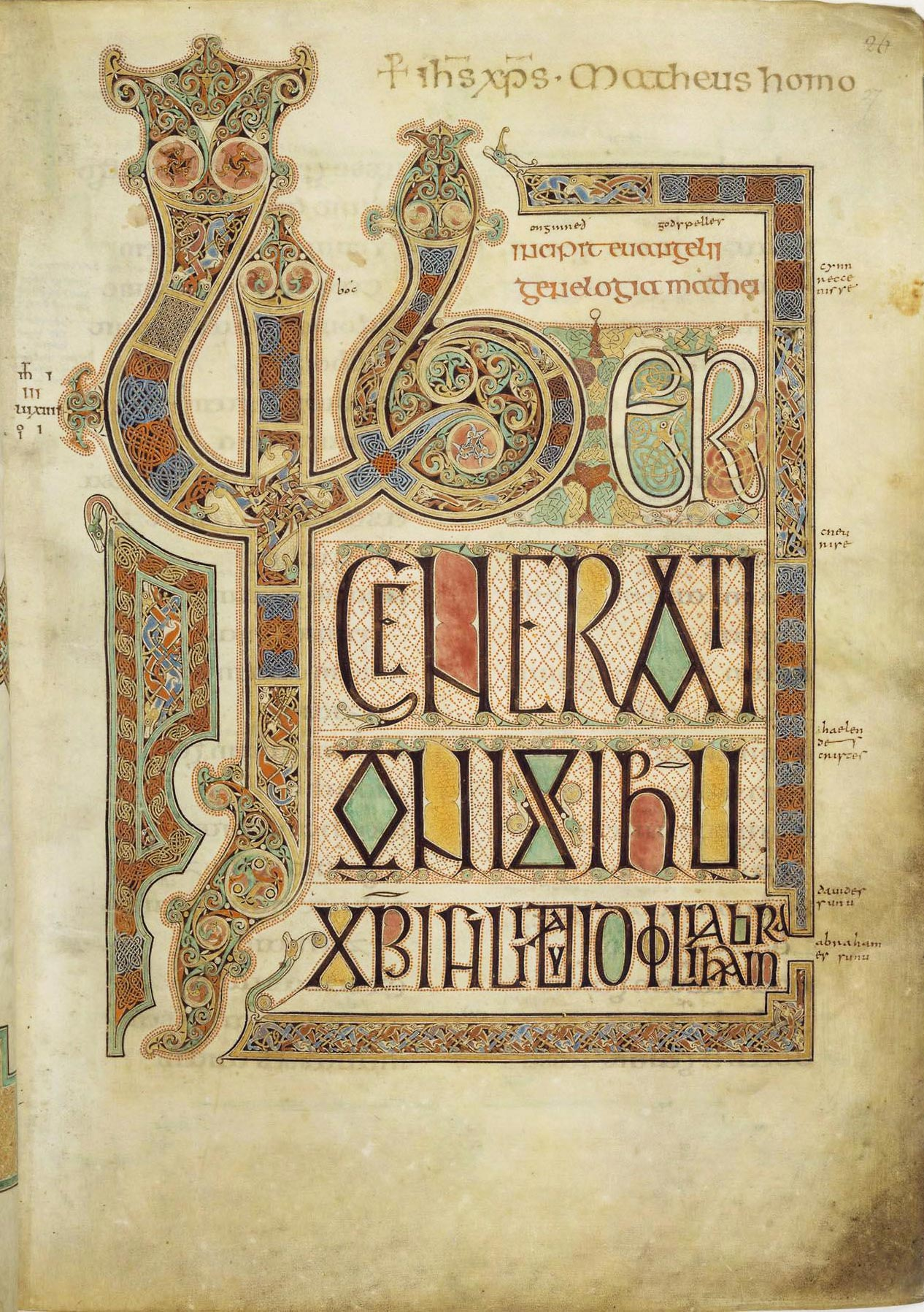
The Incipit to Matthew from the Book of Lindisfarne, an Insular masterpiece

The influence of later invasions and migrations on the English population has been debated, as studies that sampled only modern DNA have produced uncertain results and have thus been subject to a large variety of interpretations. More recently, however, ancient DNA has been used to provide a clearer picture of the genetic effects of these movements of people.

One 2016 study, using Iron Age and Anglo-Saxon era DNA found at grave sites in Cambridgeshire, calculated that ten modern day eastern English samples had 38% Anglo-Saxon ancestry on average, while ten Welsh and Scottish samples each had 30% Anglo-Saxon ancestry, with a large statistical spread in all cases. However, the authors noted that the similarity observed between the various sample groups was likely to be due to more recent internal migration.

Another 2016 study conducted using evidence from burials found in northern England, found that a significant genetic difference was present in bodies from the Iron Age and the Roman period on the one hand, and the Anglo-Saxon period on the other. Samples from modern-day Wales were found to be similar to those from the Iron Age and Roman burials, while samples from much of modern England, East Anglia in particular, were closer to the Anglo-Saxon-era burial. This was found to demonstrate a "profound impact" from the Anglo-Saxon migrations on the modern English gene pool, though no specific percentages were given in the study.

A third study combined the ancient data from both of the preceding studies and compared it to a large number of modern samples from across Britain and Ireland. This study found that modern southern, central and eastern English populations were of "a predominantly Anglo-Saxon-like ancestry" while those from northern and southwestern England had a greater degree of indigenous origin.

A major 2020 study, which used DNA from Viking-era burials in various regions across Europe, found that modern English samples showed nearly equal contributions from a native British "North Atlantic" population and a Danish-like population. While much of this latter genetic imprint has been attributed to earlier Anglo-Saxon settlement, it has been calculated that the modern English population has approximately 6% Danish Viking ancestry, with a further 4% contribution from a Norse-type source representative of the Norwegian Vikings. The study also found an average 9-18% admixture from a source further south in Europe, plausibly associated with the Normans and the resulting increase in population movements during that era.

A landmark 2022 study titled "The Anglo-Saxon migration and the formation of the early English gene pool", found the English to be of plurality Anglo-Saxon-like ancestry, with heavy native Celtic Briton, and also suggested medieval admixture from the Frankish areas of Europe. Significant regional variation was also observed.

== History of English people ==
=== Anglo-Saxon settlement ===
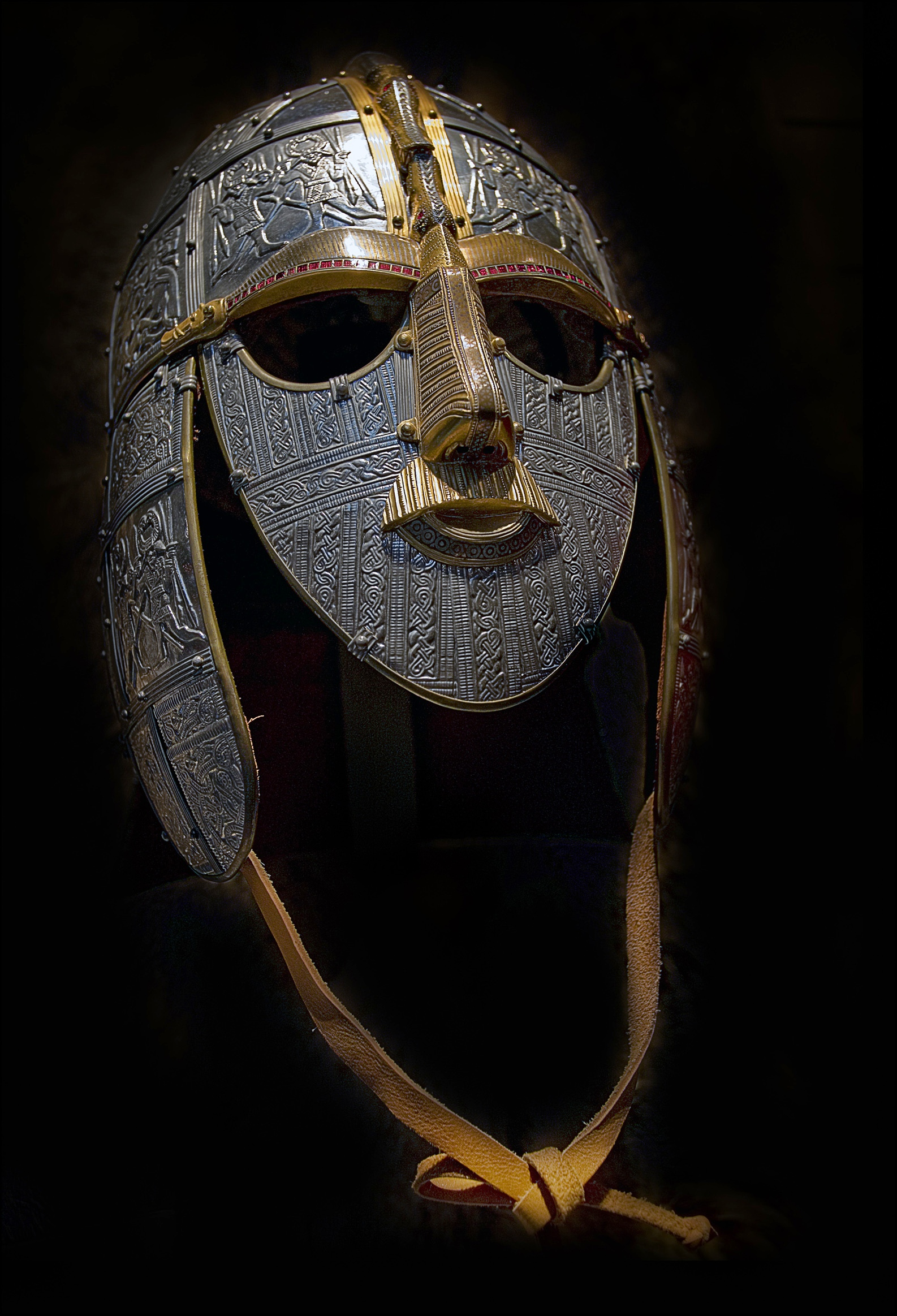
A replica of the Sutton Hoo helmet

The first people to be called "English" were the Anglo-Saxons, a group of closely related Germanic tribes that began migrating to eastern and southern Britain, from southern Denmark and northern Germany, in the 5th century AD, after the Romans had withdrawn from Britain. The Anglo-Saxons gave their name to England ("Engla land", meaning "Land of the Angles") and to the English.

The Anglo-Saxons arrived in a land that was already populated by people commonly referred to as the "Romano-British"—the descendants of the native Brittonic-speaking population that lived in the area of Britain under Roman rule during the 1st–5th centuries AD. The multi-ethnic nature of the Roman Empire meant that small numbers of other peoples may have also been present in England before the Anglo-Saxons arrived. There is archaeological evidence, for example, of an early North African presence in a Roman garrison at Aballava, now Burgh-by-Sands, in Cumbria: a 4th-century inscription says that the Roman military unit "Numerus Maurorum Aurelianorum" ("unit of Aurelian Moors") from Mauretania (Morocco) was stationed there. Although the Roman Empire incorporated peoples from far and wide, genetic studies suggest the Romans did not significantly mix into the British population.

Southern Britain in AD 600 after the Anglo-Saxon settlement, showing England's division into multiple petty kingdoms

The exact nature of the arrival of the Anglo-Saxons and their relationship with the Romano-British is a matter of debate. The traditional view is that a mass invasion by various Anglo-Saxon tribes largely displaced the indigenous British population in southern and eastern Britain (modern-day England with the exception of Cornwall). This is supported by the writings of Gildas, who gives the only contemporary historical account of the period, and describes the slaughter and starvation of native Britons by invading tribes (aduentus Saxonum). Furthermore, the English language contains no more than a handful of words borrowed from Brittonic sources.

This view was later re-evaluated by some archaeologists and historians, with a more small-scale migration being posited, possibly based around an elite of male warriors that took over the rule of the country and gradually acculturated the people living there. Within this theory, two processes leading to Anglo-Saxonisation have been proposed. One is similar to culture changes observed in North Africa and parts of the Islamic world, where a politically and socially powerful minority culture becomes, over a rather short period, adopted by a settled majority. This process is usually termed "elite dominance". The second process is explained through incentives, such as the Wergild outlined in the law code of Ine of Wessex which produced an incentive to become Anglo-Saxon or at least English speaking. Historian Malcolm Todd writes, "It is much more likely that a large proportion of the British population remained in place and was progressively dominated by a Germanic aristocracy, in some cases marrying into it and leaving Celtic names in the, admittedly very dubious, early lists of Anglo-Saxon dynasties. But how we identify the surviving Britons in areas of predominantly Anglo-Saxon settlement, either archaeologically or linguistically, is still one of the deepest problems of early English history."

An emerging view is that the degree of population replacement by the Anglo-Saxons, and thus the degree of survival of the Romano-Britons, varied across England, and that as such the overall settlement of Britain by the Anglo-Saxons cannot be described by any one process in particular. Large-scale migration and population shift seems to be most applicable in the cases of eastern regions such as East Anglia and Lincolnshire, while in parts of Northumbria, much of the native population likely remained in place as the incomers took over as elites. In a study of place names in northeastern England and southern Scotland, Bethany Fox found that the migrants settled in large numbers in river valleys, such as those of the Tyne and the Tweed, with the Britons moving to the less fertile hill country and becoming acculturated over a longer period. Fox describes the process by which English came to dominate this region as "a synthesis of mass-migration and elite-takeover models."

=== Vikings and the Danelaw ===
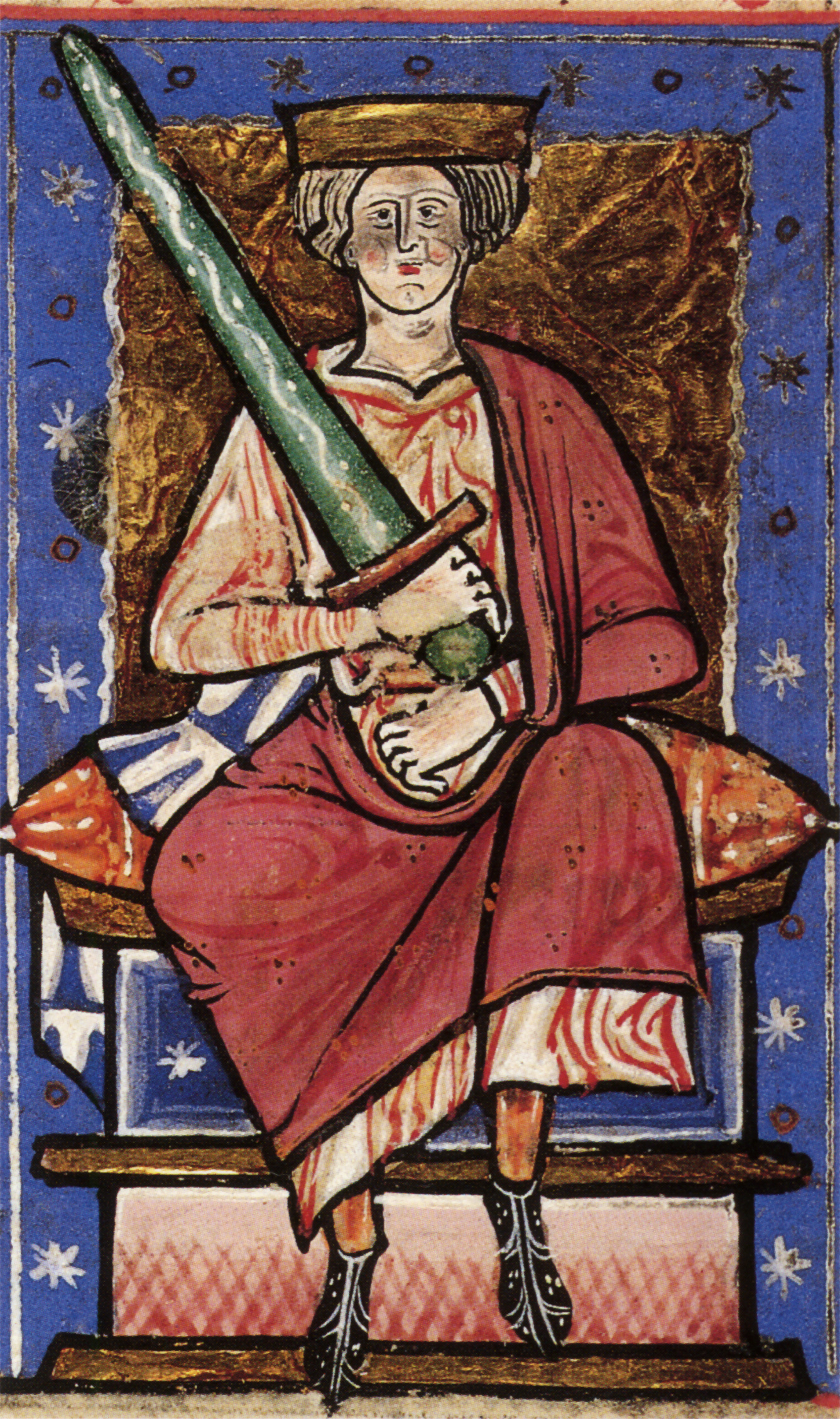
Æthelred II (c. 966 – 23 April 1016), known as 'the Unready', was King of the English from 978 to 1013 and again from 1014 until his death.

From about 800 AD, waves of Danish Viking assaults on the coastlines of the British Isles were gradually followed by a succession of Danish settlers in England. At first, the Vikings were very much considered a separate people from the English. This separation was enshrined when Alfred the Great signed the Treaty of Alfred and Guthrum to establish the Danelaw, a division of England between English and Danish rule, with the Danes occupying northern and eastern England.

However, Alfred's successors subsequently won military victories against the Danes, incorporating much of the Danelaw into the nascent kingdom of England. Danish invasions continued into the 11th century, and there were both English and Danish kings in the period following the unification of England (for example, Æthelred II (Note: Spellings of this name most common in modern texts are "Ethelred" and "Æthelred" (or "Aethelred"), the latter being closer to the original Old English form Æþelræd.) (978–1013 and 1014–1016) was English but Cnut (1016–1035) was Danish).

Gradually, the Danes in England came to be seen as 'English'. They had a noticeable impact on the English language: many English words, such as anger, ball, egg, got, knife, take, and they, are of Old Norse origin, and place names that end in -thwaite and -by are Scandinavian in origin.

=== English unification ===
The English population was not politically unified until the 10th century. Before then, there were a number of petty kingdoms which gradually coalesced into a heptarchy of seven states, the most powerful of which were Mercia and Wessex. The English nation state began to form when the Anglo-Saxon kingdoms united against Danish Viking invasions, which began around 800 AD. Over the following century and a half England was for the most part a politically unified entity, and remained permanently so after 954.

The nation of England was formed in 12 July 927 by Æthelstan of Wessex after the Treaty of Eamont Bridge, as Wessex grew from a relatively small kingdom in the South West to become the founder of the Kingdom of the English, incorporating all Anglo-Saxon kingdoms and the Danelaw.

=== Norman and Angevin rule ===
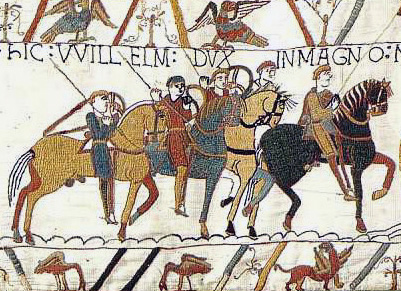
Battle of Hastings, 1066 (from the Bayeux Tapestry)

The Norman conquest of England during 1066 brought Anglo-Saxon and Danish rule of England to an end, as the new French-speaking Norman elite almost universally replaced the Anglo-Saxon aristocracy and church leaders. After the conquest, "English" normally included all natives of England, whether they were of Anglo-Saxon, Scandinavian or Celtic ancestry, to distinguish them from the Norman invaders, who were regarded as "Norman" even if born in England, for a generation or two after the Conquest. The Norman dynasty ruled England for 87 years until the death of King Stephen in 1154, when the succession passed to Henry II, House of Plantagenet (based in France), and England became part of the Angevin Empire until its collapse in 1214.

Anglo-Norman and Latin continued to be the two languages used officially by the Plantagenet kings until Edward I came to the throne, when Middle English became used in official documents, but alongside Anglo-Norman and Latin. Over time the English language became more important even in the court, and the Normans were gradually assimilated, until, by the 14th century, both rulers and subjects regarded themselves as English and spoke the English language.

Despite the assimilation of the Normans, the distinction between 'English' and 'French' people survived in some official documents long after it had fallen out of common use, in particular in the legal process Presentment of Englishry (a rule by which a hundred had to prove an unidentified murdered body found on their soil to be that of an Englishman, rather than a Norman, if they wanted to avoid a fine). This law was abolished in 1340.

=== United Kingdom ===

Since the 18th century, England has been one part of a wider political entity covering all or part of the British Isles, which today is called the United Kingdom. Wales was annexed by England by the Laws in Wales Acts 1535–1542, which incorporated Wales into the English state. A new British identity was subsequently developed when James VI of Scotland became James I of England as well, and expressed the desire to be known as the monarch of Britain.

In 1707, England formed a union with Scotland by passing an Act of Union in March 1707 that ratified the Treaty of Union. The Parliament of Scotland had previously passed its own Act of Union, so the Kingdom of Great Britain was born on 1 May 1707. In 1801, another Act of Union formed a union between the Kingdom of Great Britain and the Kingdom of Ireland, creating the United Kingdom of Great Britain and Ireland. In 1922, about two-thirds of the Irish population (those who lived in 26 of the 32 counties of Ireland), left the United Kingdom to form the Irish Free State. The remainder became the United Kingdom of Great Britain and Northern Ireland, although this name was not introduced until 1927, after some years in which the term "United Kingdom" had been little used.

Throughout the history of the UK, the English have been dominant in population and in political weight. As a consequence, notions of 'Englishness' and 'Britishness' are often very similar. At the same time, after the Union of 1707, the English, along with the other peoples of the British Isles, have been encouraged to think of themselves as British rather than to identify themselves with the constituent nations.

=== Immigration and assimilation ===
England has been the destination of varied numbers of migrants at different periods from the 17th century onwards. While some members of these groups seek to practise a form of pluralism, attempting to maintain a separate ethnic identity, others have assimilated and intermarried with the English. Since Oliver Cromwell's resettlement of the Jews in 1656, there have been waves of Jewish immigration from Russia in the 19th century and from Germany in the 20th.

After the French king Louis XIV declared Protestantism illegal in 1685 in the Edict of Fontainebleau, an estimated 50,000 Protestant Huguenots fled to England. Due to sustained and sometimes mass emigration of the Irish, current estimates indicate that around 6 million people in the UK have at least one grandparent born in the Republic of Ireland.

There has been a small black presence in England since the 16th century due to the slave trade, and a small Indian presence since at least the 17th century because of the East India Company and British Raj. Black and Asian populations have only grown throughout the UK generally, as immigration from the British Empire and the subsequent Commonwealth of Nations was encouraged due to labour shortages during post World War II rebuilding. However, these groups are often still considered to be ethnic minorities and research has shown that black and Asian people in the UK are more likely to identify as British rather than with one of the state's four constituent nations, including England.

A nationally representative survey published in June 2021 found that a majority of respondents thought that being English was not dependent on race. 77% of white respondents in England agreed that "Being English is open to people of different ethnic backgrounds who identify as English", whereas 14% were of the view that "Only people who are white count as truly English". Amongst ethnic minority respondents, the equivalent figures were 68% and 19%. Research has found that the proportion of people who consider being white to be a necessary component of Englishness has declined over time.

=== Current national and political identity ===
The 1990s witnessed a resurgence of English national identity. Survey data shows a rise in the number of people in England describing their national identity as English and a fall in the number describing themselves as British. Today, black and minority ethnic people of England still generally identify as British rather than English to a greater extent than their white counterparts; however, groups such as the Campaign for an English Parliament (CEP) suggest the emergence of a broader civic and multi-ethnic English nationhood. Scholars and journalists have noted a rise in English self-consciousness, with increased use of the English flag, particularly at football matches where the Union Flag was previously more commonly flown by fans.

This perceived rise in English self-consciousness has generally been attributed to the devolution in the late 1990s of some powers to the Scottish Parliament and National Assembly for Wales. In policy areas for which the devolved administrations in Scotland, Wales and Northern Ireland have responsibility, the UK Parliament votes on laws that consequently only apply to England. Because the Westminster Parliament is composed of MPs from throughout the United Kingdom, this has given rise to the "West Lothian question", a reference to the situation in which MPs representing constituencies outside England can vote on matters affecting only England, but MPs cannot vote on the same matters in relation to the other parts of the UK. Consequently, groups such as the CEP have called for the creation of a devolved English Parliament, claiming that there is now a discriminatory democratic deficit against the English. The establishment of an English parliament has also been backed by a number of Scottish and Welsh nationalists. Writer Paul Johnson has suggested that like most dominant groups, the English have only demonstrated interest in their ethnic self-definition when they were feeling oppressed.

John Curtice argues that "In the early years of devolution...there was little sign" of an English backlash against devolution for Scotland and Wales, but that more recently survey data shows tentative signs of "a form of English nationalism...beginning to emerge among the general public". Michael Kenny, Richard English and Richard Hayton, meanwhile, argue that the resurgence in English nationalism predates devolution, being observable in the early 1990s, but that this resurgence does not necessarily have negative implications for the perception of the UK as a political union. Others question whether devolution has led to a rise in English national identity at all, arguing that survey data fails to portray the complex nature of national identities, with many people considering themselves both English and British. A 2017 survey by YouGov found that 38% of English voters considered themselves both English and British, alongside 19% who felt English but not British.

Recent surveys of public opinion on the establishment of an English parliament have given widely varying conclusions. In the first five years of devolution for Scotland and Wales, support in England for the establishment of an English parliament was low at between 16 and 19%, according to successive British Social Attitudes Surveys. A report, also based on the British Social Attitudes Survey, published in December 2010 suggests that only 29% of people in England support the establishment of an English parliament, though this figure had risen from 17% in 2007.

One 2007 poll carried out for BBC Newsnight, however, found that 61 per cent would support such a parliament being established. Krishan Kumar notes that support for measures to ensure that only English MPs can vote on legislation that applies only to England is generally higher than that for the establishment of an English parliament, although support for both varies depending on the timing of the opinion poll and the wording of the question. Electoral support for English nationalist parties is also low, even though there is public support for many of the policies they espouse. The English Democrats gained just 64,826 votes in the 2010 UK general election, accounting for 0.3 per cent of all votes cast in England. Kumar argued in 2010 that "despite devolution and occasional bursts of English nationalism – more an expression of exasperation with the Scots or Northern Irish – the English remain on the whole satisfied with current constitutional arrangements".

== English diaspora ==
Numbers of the English diaspora
Year	Country	Population	% of pop.
2021	Australia	8,385,928	33.0
2020	United States	46,550,968	19.8
2016	Canada	6,320,085	18.3
2022	Scotland	506,207	9.3
2018	New Zealand	72,204 (Note: Those who self-identified as English ethnic group)–210,915 (Note: 210915 listed their birthplace as England.)	4.5

From the earliest times, English people have left England to settle in other parts of Great Britain and Northern Ireland. It is impossible to identify their numbers, as British censuses have historically not invited respondents to identify themselves as English. However, the census does record place of birth, revealing that 8.1% of Scotland's population, 3.7% of the population of Northern Ireland and 20% of the Welsh population were born in England. While, the census of the Republic of Ireland does not collect information on the English ethnicity specifically as they are inside the white other category, but it does have record that there are over 200,000 people living in Ireland who were born in England and Wales.

English ethnic descent and emigrant communities are found primarily in the Western world, and settled in significant numbers in some areas. Substantial populations descended from English colonists and immigrants exist in the United States, Canada, Australia, South Africa and New Zealand.

=== United States ===
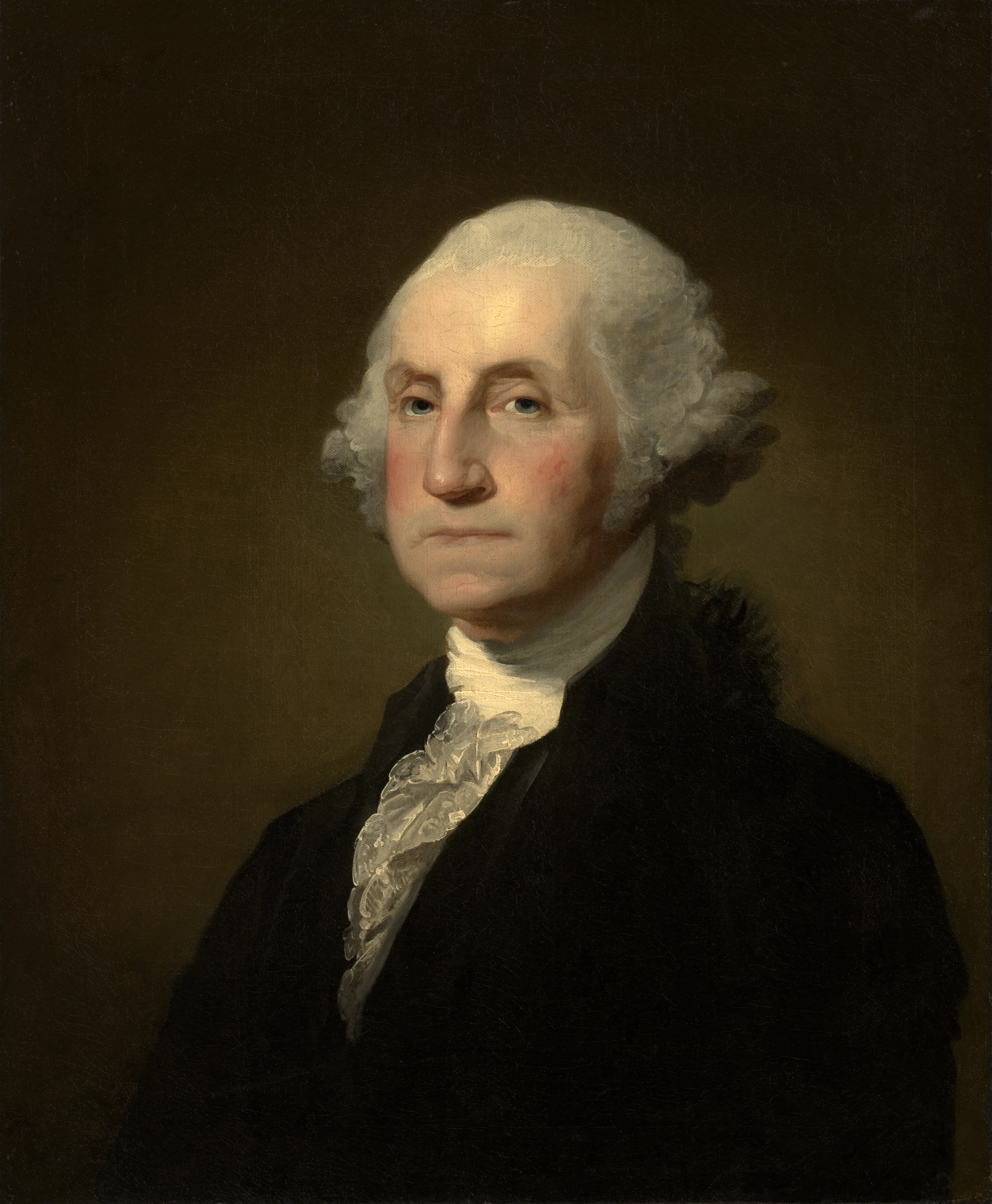
George Washington, known as the "Father of His Country", and first President of the United States, had English ancestors.

In the 2020 United States census, English Americans were the largest group in the United States with 46.5 million Americans self-identifying as having some English origins (many combined with another heritage) representing (19.8%) of the White American population. This includes 25.5 million (12.5%) who were "English alone" - one origin. However, demographers regard this as an undercount, as the index of inconsistency is high, and many, if not most, people from English stock have a tendency (since the introduction of a new 'American' category and ignoring the ancestry question in the 2000 census) to identify as simply Americans or if of mixed European ancestry, identify with a more recent and differentiated ethnic group.

In the 2000 census, 24,509,692 Americans described their ancestry as wholly or partly English. In addition, 1,035,133 recorded British ancestry. This was a numerical decrease from the census in 1990 where 32,651,788 people or 13.1% of the population self-identified with English ancestry.

In 1980, over 49 million (49,598,035) Americans claimed English ancestry, at the time around 26.3% of the total population and largest reported group which, even today, would make them the largest ethnic group in the United States. Scots-Irish Americans are descendants of Lowland Scots and Northern English (specifically: County Durham, Cumberland, Northumberland and Westmorland) settlers who colonised Ireland during the Plantation of Ulster in the 17th century.

Americans of English heritage are often seen, and identify, as simply "American" due to the many historic cultural ties between England and the U.S. and their influence on the country's population. Relative to ethnic groups of other European origins, this may be due to the early establishment of English settlements forging the society; as well as to non-English groups having emigrated in order to establish significant communities.

The principal settlers of the 17th century American colonies were primarily English and established the foundations of the country and formed the basis of its culture.

=== Canada ===
In the Canada 2016 Census, 'English' was the most common ethnic origin (ethnic origin refers to the ethnic or cultural group(s) to which the respondent's ancestors belong) recorded by respondents; 6,320,085 people or 18.3% of the population self-identified themselves as wholly or partly English. On the other hand, people identifying as Canadian but not English may have previously identified as English before the option of identifying as Canadian was available.

=== Australia ===
Edmund Barton and Alfred Deakin, 1st and 2nd Prime Minister of Australia both had English parents.

From the beginning of the colonial era until the mid-20th century, the vast majority of settlers to Australia were from the British Isles, with the English being the dominant group. Among the leading ancestries, increases in Australian, Irish and German ancestries and decreases in English, Scottish and Welsh ancestries appear to reflect such shifts in perception or reporting. These reporting shifts at least partly resulted from changes in the design of the census question, in particular the introduction of a tick box format in 2001. English Australians have more often come from the south than the north of England.

Australians of English descent, are both the single largest ethnic group in Australia and the largest 'ancestry' identity in the Australian census. In the 2016 census, 7.8 million or 36.1% of the population identified as "English" or a combination including English, a numerical increase from 7.2 million over the 2011 census figure. The census also documented 907,572 residents or 3.9% of Australia as being born in England, and are the largest overseas-born population.

=== New Zealand ===
English ancestry is the largest single ancestry New Zealanders share. Several million New Zealanders are estimated to have some English ancestry From 1840, the English comprised the largest single group among New Zealand's overseas-born, consistently being over 50 percent of the total population. Despite this, after the early 1850s, the English-born slowly fell from being a majority of the colonial population. In the 1851 census, 50.5% of the total population were born in England, this proportion fell to 36.5% (1861) and 24.3% by 1881. New Zealand's foundational culture was English, given the strong representation in the mid and late-nineteenth century with the English being the largest in migration inflows.

In the 2013 census, there were 215,589 English-born representing 21.5% of all overseas-born residents or 5 percent of the total population and the most-common birthplace outside New Zealand. In the recent 2018 census, 210,915 were born in England or 4.49% of the total population, a slight decrease from 2013.

=== Argentina ===
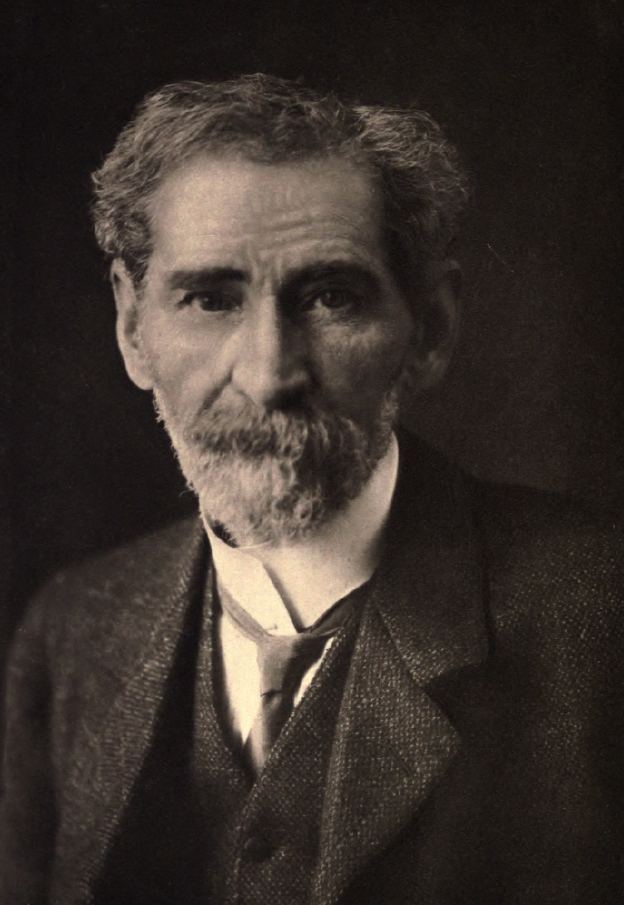
William Henry Hudson was an Argentine author, naturalist, and ornithologist of English origin.

English settlers arrived in Buenos Aires in 1806 (then a Spanish colony) in small numbers, mostly as businessmen, when Argentina was an emerging nation and the settlers were welcomed for the stability they brought to commercial life. As the 19th century progressed, more English families arrived, and many bought land to develop the potential of the Argentine pampas for the large-scale growing of crops. The English founded banks, developed the export trade in crops and animal products and imported the luxuries that the growing Argentine middle classes sought.

As well as those who went to Argentina as industrialists and major landowners, others went as railway engineers, civil engineers and to work in banking and commerce. Others went to become whalers, missionaries and simply to seek out a future. English families sent second and younger sons, or what were described as the black sheep of the family, to Argentina to make their fortunes in cattle and wheat. English settlers introduced football to Argentina. Some English families owned sugar plantations.

=== Chile ===
Since the Port of Valparaíso opened its coasts to free trade in 1811, the English began to congregate in Valparaíso. The English eventually numbered more than 32,000 during the port of Valparaíso's boom period during the saltpeter bonanza at the end of the 19th and beginning of the 20th centuries.

== Culture ==
The culture of England is sometimes difficult to separate clearly from the culture of the United Kingdom, so influential has English culture been on the cultures of the British Isles and, on the other hand, given the extent to which other cultures have influenced life in England.

=== Religion ===
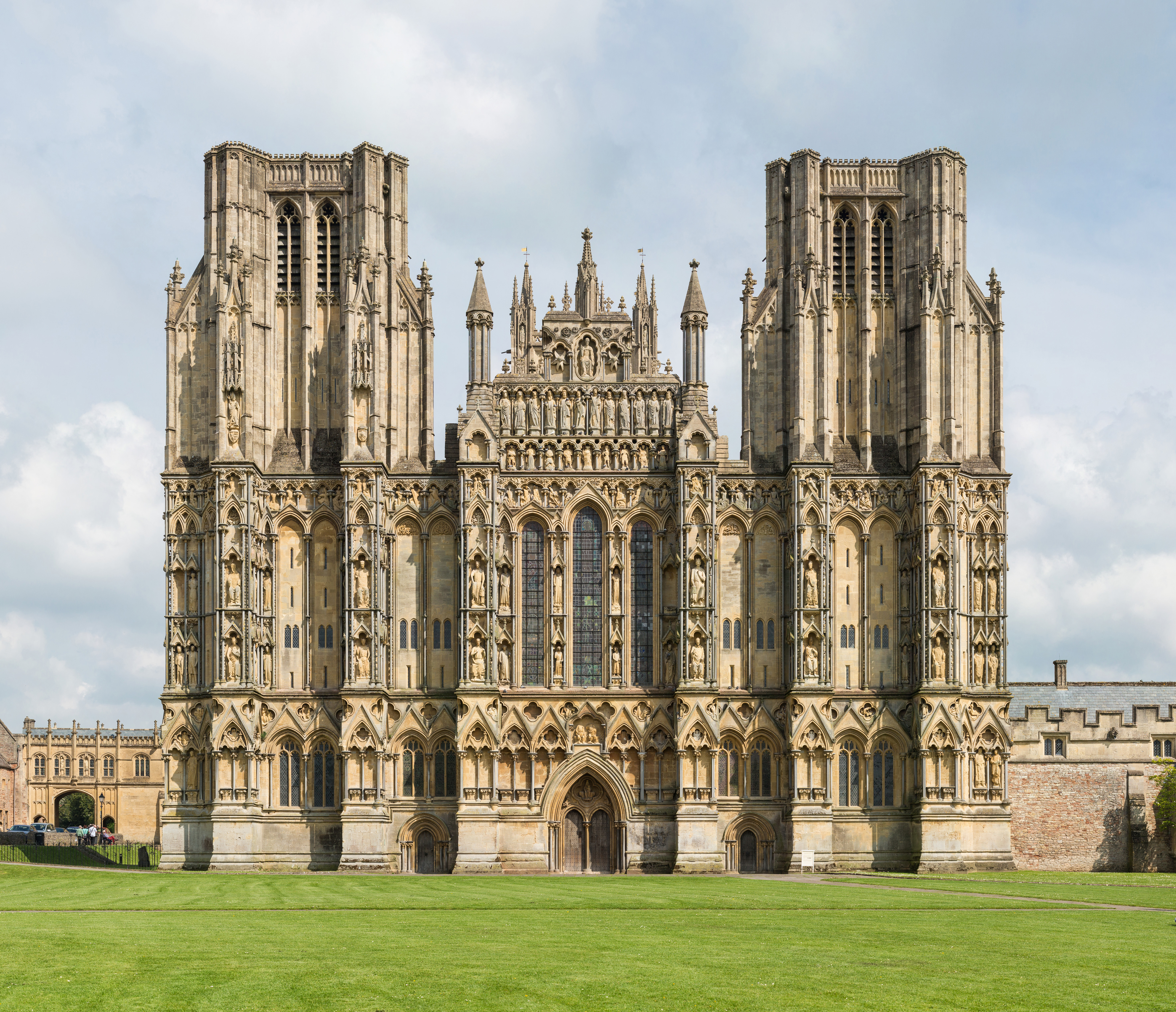
Wells Cathedral, Somerset

The established religion of the realm is the Church of England, whose titular head is Charles III although the worldwide Anglican Communion is overseen by the General Synod of its bishops under the authority of Parliament. 26 of the church's 42 bishops are Lords Spiritual, representing the church in the House of Lords. In 2010, the Church of England counted 25 million baptised members out of the 41 million Christians in Great Britain's population of about 60 million; around the same time, it also claimed to baptise one in eight newborn children. Generally, anyone in England may marry or be buried at their local parish church, whether or not they have been baptised in the church. Actual attendance has declined steadily since 1890, with around one million, or 10% of the baptised population attending Sunday services on a regular basis (defined as once a month or more) and three million -roughly 15%- joining Christmas Eve and Christmas services.

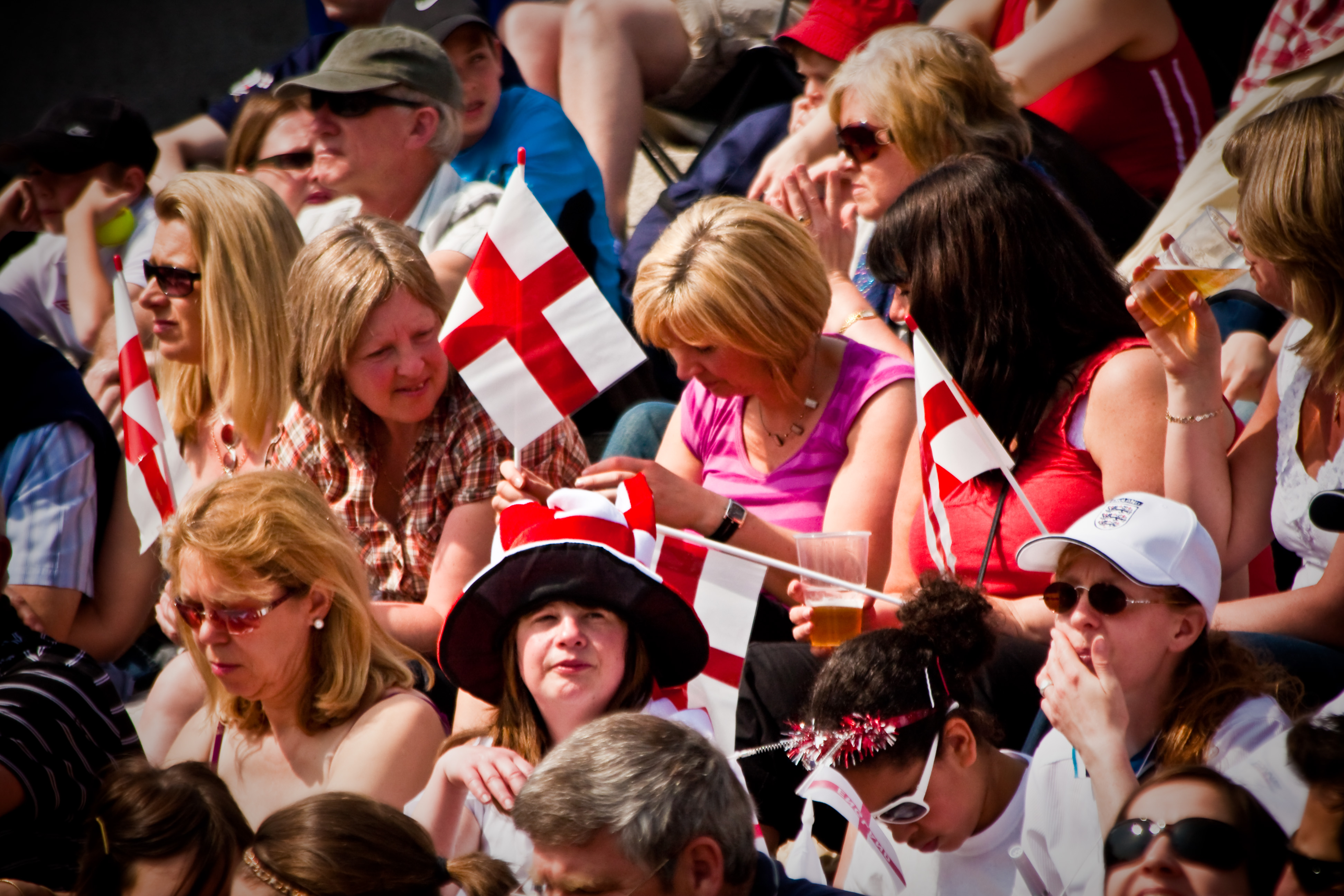
A crowd celebrates Saint George's Day at an event in Trafalgar Square in 2010.

Saint George is recognised as the patron saint of England, and the flag of England consists of his cross. Before Edward III, the patron saint was St Edmund; and St Alban is also honoured as England's first martyr. A survey carried out in the end of 2008 by Ipsos MORI on behalf of The Catholic Agency For Overseas Development found the population of England and Wales to be 47.0% affiliated with the Church of England, which is also the state church, 9.6% with the Roman Catholic Church and 8.7% were other Christians, mainly Free church Protestants and Eastern Orthodox Christians. 4.8% were Muslim, 3.4% were members of other religions, 5.3% were agnostics, 6.8% were atheists and 15.0% were not sure about their religious affiliation or refused to answer to the question.

Religious observance of Saint George's Day (23 April) changes when it is too close to Easter. According to the Church of England's calendar, when St George's Day falls between Palm Sunday and the Second Sunday of Easter inclusive, it is moved to the Monday after the Second Sunday of Easter.

=== Language ===
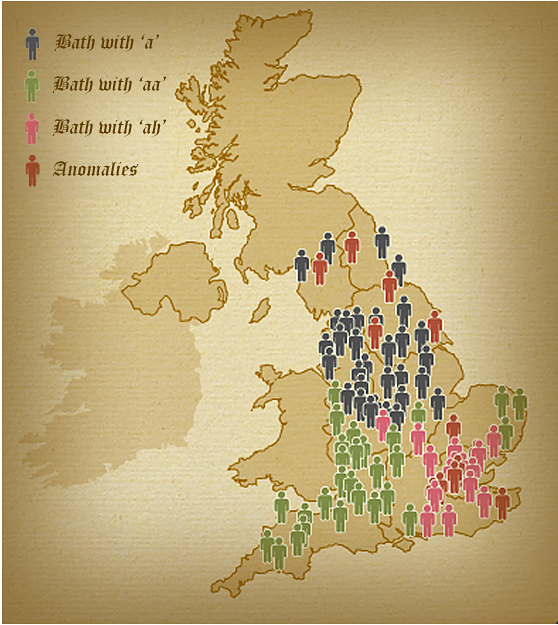
Map showing phonological variation within England of the vowel in bath, grass, and dance: 'a' [ä] 'aa' [æː] 'ah' [ɑː] anomalies

English people traditionally speak the English language, a member of the West Germanic language family. The modern English language evolved from Middle English (the form of language in use by the English people from the 12th to the 15th century); Middle English was influenced lexically by Norman-French, Old French and Latin. In the Middle English period Latin was the language of administration and the nobility spoke Norman French. Middle English was itself derived from the Old English of the Anglo-Saxon period; in the Northern and Eastern parts of England the Old Norse language of Danish settlers had also influenced the language.

There were once many different dialects of modern English in England, which were recorded in projects such as the English Dialect Dictionary (late 19th century) and the Survey of English Dialects (mid 20th century), but there has been widespread dialect levelling in recent time as a result of education, the media and socio-economic pressures.

Cornish, a Celtic language, is one of three existing Brittonic languages; its usage has been revived in Cornwall. Historically, another Brittonic Celtic language, Cumbric, was spoken in Cumbria in North West England, but it died out in the 11th century although traces of it can still be found in the Cumbrian dialect. Early Modern English began in the late 15th century with the introduction of the printing press to London and the Great Vowel Shift. Through the worldwide influence of the British Empire, English spread around the world from the 17th to mid-20th centuries. Through newspapers, books, the telegraph, the telephone, phonograph records, radio, satellite television, broadcasters (such as the BBC) and the Internet, as well as the emergence of the United States as a global superpower, Modern English has become the international language of business, science, communication, sports, aviation, and diplomacy.

=== Literature ===
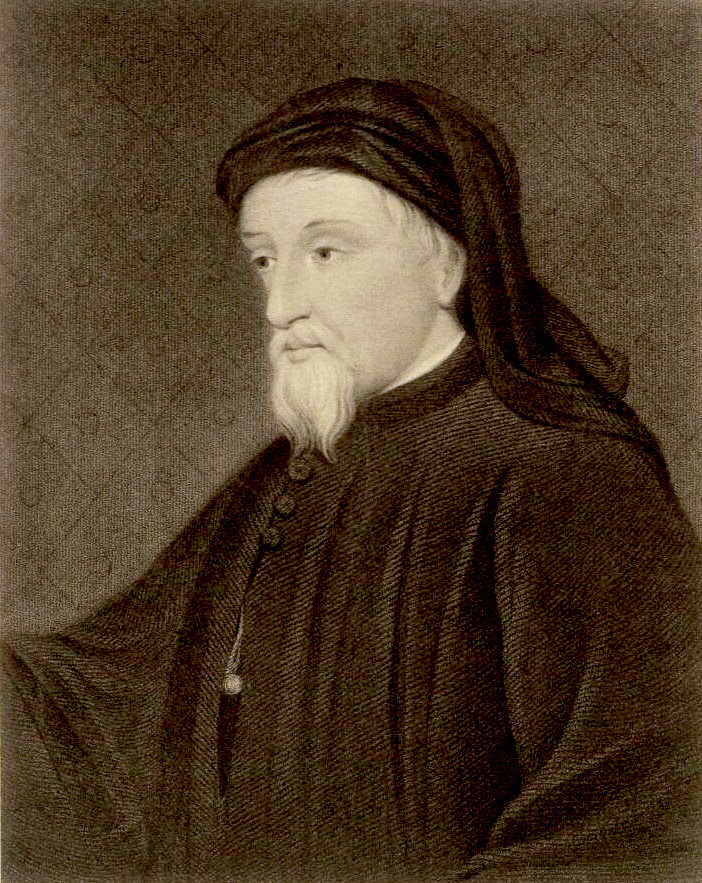
Geoffrey Chaucer (/ˈtʃɔːsər/; c. 1340s – 25 October 1400) was an English poet and author. Widely seen as the greatest English poet of the Middle Ages, he is best known for The Canterbury Tales.

English literature begins with Anglo-Saxon literature, which was written in Old English and produced epic works such as Beowulf and the fragmentary The Battle of Maldon, The Seafarer and The Wanderer. For many years, Latin and French were the preferred literary languages of England, but in the medieval period there was a flourishing of literature in Middle English; Geoffrey Chaucer is the most famous writer of this period.

The Elizabethan era is sometimes described as the golden age of English literature with writers such as William Shakespeare, Thomas Nashe, Edmund Spenser, Sir Philip Sidney, Christopher Marlowe and Ben Jonson.

Other famous English writers include Jane Austen, Arnold Bennett, Rupert Brooke, Agatha Christie, Charles Dickens, Thomas Hardy, A. E. Housman, George Orwell and the Lake Poets.

In 2003, the BBC carried out a UK survey entitled The Big Read in order to find the "nation's best-loved novel" of all time, with works by English novelists J. R. R. Tolkien, Jane Austen, Philip Pullman, Douglas Adams and J. K. Rowling making up the top five on the list.

== See also ==
- List of English people
- Old English (Ireland)
- Celtic peoples
- English art
- Architecture of England
- English nationalism
- European ethnic groups
- 100% English (Channel 4 TV programme, 2006)
- Social history of the United Kingdom (1945–present)
- White British

Language:

- Anglicisation
- English-speaking world

Diaspora:

- British diaspora in Africa
- Anglo-Burmese
- Metis people
- Anglo-Indian
- Anglo-Irish
- Anglo-Scot
- English Brazilian
