= Diane Chenery-Wickens =

English make-up artist

- Born: Diane Gina Wickens; 21 December 1959; Lambeth, Greater London, UK
- Died: 22 January 2008 (aged 48); Duddleswell, East Sussex, UK
- Other name: Di Wickens
- Spouse: David Edwin George Chenery-Wickens (m. 1997)

Diane Gina Chenery-Wickens (21 December 1959 – 22 January 2008) was an English film and television make-up artist.

== Professional career ==
Diane Chenery-Wickens had worked as a makeup artist for BBC Television for over 20 years. She worked on such shows as The League of Gentlemen, Casualty and Pride and Prejudice. She also won an Emmy Award in 2000 for Arabian Nights, and was nominated for a BAFTA Award in 2003 for Dead Ringers.

== Death ==
On 22 January 2008, Diane discovered a phone bill that showed calls to a mistress and a gay chatline. She confronted her husband, David Edwin George Chenery-Wickens, at their home in Duddleswell, East Sussex. He killed her and dumped her body in a lane in Little Horsted, near Uckfield. Diane was reported missing by David on 24 January 2008, after she had failed to arrive for a BBC meeting in London. Her decomposed body was found by a woman walking her dog on 15 May 2008. David was arrested on suspicion of murder, and was eventually charged in May 2008. He was found guilty of murder at Lewes Crown Court on 2 March 2009 and sentenced to life imprisonment.

On 30 March 2009, the BBC One programme Crimewatch showed a reconstruction of how the crime was solved. In October 2019, the police methods used in the case were examined in the BBC Two programme Catching Britain's Killers: The Crimes That Changed Us.

== See also ==
- List of solved missing person cases (2000s)
