= 100% English =

British television programme

- Genre: Documentary
- Presented by: Andrew Graham-Dixon
- Country of origin: United Kingdom
- Original language: English

Production
- Running time: 60 minutes

Original release
- Network: Channel 4
- Release: November 2006

100% English is a Channel 4 television programme shown in November 2006 in the United Kingdom. It looked at the genetic makeup of English people who considered themselves to be ethnically English and found that while all had an ethnic makeup similar to people of European descent, a minority discovered genetic markers from North Africa and the Middle East from several generations before they were born. The presenter was Andrew Graham-Dixon. The test results were interpreted by DNAPrint Genomics, based in Sarasota, Florida, United States.

The concept of the show was to:

Take eight people – all of whom are convinced they are 100% English. Then submit a sample of their DNA to a series of state-of-the-art tests ... Lord Tebbit, Garry Bushell and Carol Thatcher are among the participants who have agreed to place their genetic make-up under the microscope ...

Garry Bushell, who appeared on the show, later criticised the slant of the programme and the portrayal of English people. On his website he stated: "Only Nazis, and it appears C4, think of national identity in terms of racial purity ... Besides, you could apply the same tests to the French, Greeks, or Italians and get similar results, but no-one questions their right to nationhood."

== See also ==
- Genetic genealogy
