= A History of British Art =

- Written by: Andrew Graham-Dixon
- Directed by: Paul Tickell
- Presented by: Andrew Graham-Dixon
- Country of origin: United Kingdom
- Original language: English
- No. of series: 1
- No. of episodes: 6

Production
- Executive producer: Roland Keating
- Producers: Andrew Graham-Dixon; Tanya Seghatchian; Paul Tickell
- Running time: 50 minutes
- Production company: BBC

Original release
- Network: BBC2
- Release: 21 April – 26 May 1996

A History of British Art is a 1996 BBC six-part television documentary series tracing the history of British art from 1066 to the modern day. Written and presented by Andrew Graham-Dixon, it was originally aired on BBC2 in 1996 and later repeated on BBC Four in 2008.
