= Andrew Graham-Dixon =

British art historian, art critic, author and broadcaster (born 1960)

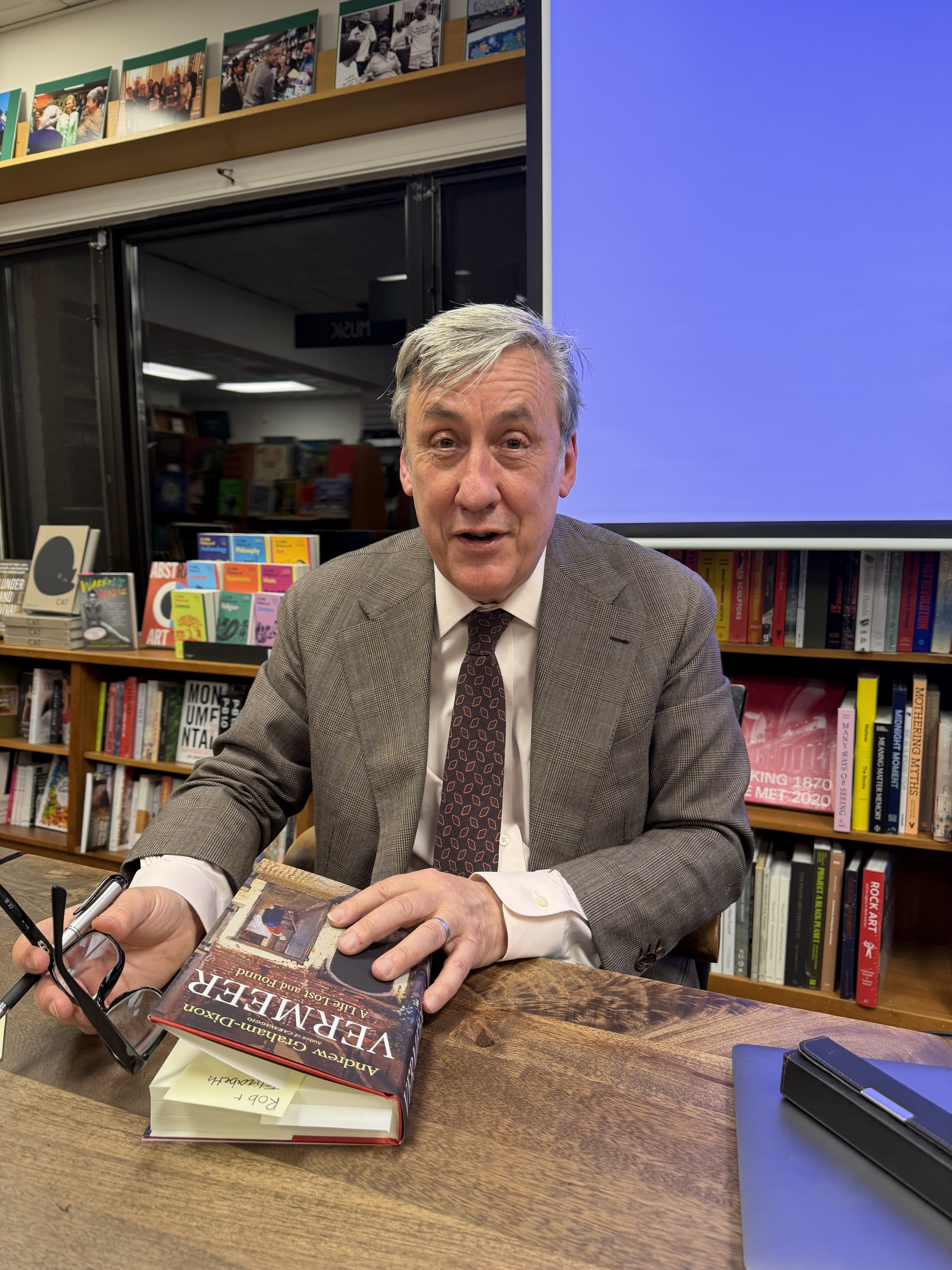
- Graham-Dixon in 2026
- Born: Andrew Michael Graham-Dixon; 26 December 1960 (age 65); London, England
- Education: Christ Church, Oxford (BA); Courtauld Institute of Art (attended)
- Website: Official website

Andrew Michael Graham-Dixon (born 26 December 1960) is a British art historian, art critic, author and broadcaster. He served as chief art critic at both The Independent and The Daily Telegraph newspapers, and presents art documentaries for BBC Television, as well as five series of Italy Unpacked, in which he explores the culture and cuisine of Italy with chef Giorgio Locatelli.

He has written a number of books about art and artists, including a biography of Caravaggio, which was shortlisted for the Samuel Johnson Prize for non-fiction in 2012.

== Life and career ==
=== Early life and education ===
Andrew Graham-Dixon is a son of the barrister Anthony Philip Graham-Dixon (1929–2012), Q.C., and (Margaret) Suzanne "Sue" (née Villar, 1931–2010), a publicist for music and opera companies.

Graham-Dixon was born on 26 December 1960 in London and was educated at Westminster School, a public school. He continued his education at Christ Church, Oxford, where he read Language and Literature. He graduated in 1981 and then pursued doctoral studies at the Courtauld Institute of Art, University of London from 1982.

=== Career ===
Graham-Dixon began work as a reviewer for the short-lived weekly The Sunday Correspondent before becoming the chief art critic of The Independent, where he remained until 1998. He won the Arts Journalist of the Year Award three years in a row – in 1987, 1988 and 1989. He later became the chief art critic of The Sunday Telegraph.

In 1992 Graham-Dixon won the first prize in the Reportage section at the Montreal World Film Festival for a documentary film about Théodore Géricault's painting The Raft of the Medusa. From 2004 he was a contributor to The Culture Show on BBC Two, covering a variety of subjects and often acting as the main presenter. He has also presented many BBC documentary series on art, including A History of British Art (1996), Renaissance (1999), Caravaggio (2002), The Secret of Drawing (2005), The Battle for British Art (2007), Art of Eternity (2007), Art of Spain (2008), The Art of Russia (2009), Art of Germany (2010), Art of America (2011), British Art at War: Bomberg, Sickert and Nash (2014), Art of China (2014) and Art of France (2017). He is passionate about the Mona Lisa, appearing in the popular BBC documentary Secrets of the Mona Lisa (2015). In 2018 he presented a four-part series on BBC Four – Art, Passion & Power: The Story of the Royal Collection.

He has also presented programmes on subjects other than art, such as I, Samurai (2006) and The Real Casino Royale for the BBC and 100% English (2006) for Channel 4. In 2010 he interviewed John Lydon for a Culture Show special about Public Image Ltd.

In 2016 and 2018 he gave lectures as part of the Alpine Fellowship symposium in Venice. In 2022 he gave a lecture at their symposium in Ellenborough Park, UK.

His publications include Howard Hodgkin (1993), A History of British Art (1995), Paper Museum: Writings About Painting, Mostly (1995), Renaissance (1999), In the Picture (2005), an anthology of articles published between 2001 and 2006 in the Sunday Telegraph, and Michelangelo and the Sistine Chapel (2007).

Graham-Dixon also wrote and presented the BBC documentary Who Killed Caravaggio?, broadcast on BBC 4 in 2010. The same year saw the publication of his biography, Caravaggio: A Life Sacred and Profane which was shortlisted for the Samuel Johnson Prize for non-fiction in 2012. He has since published a similarly in-depth study of Johannes Vermeer — Vermeer: A Life Lost and Found (2025), which a reviewer said is "the best biography of Vermeer and the most complete analysis of his artwork that has ever been published".

He has previously judged the Turner Prize (1991), the BP Portrait Prize (2001, 2002), and the Annual British Animation Awards. He has been on the Government Art Collection Committee, the Hayward Advisory Committee, and the Baltic Centre for Contemporary Art in Gateshead. He is on the English Heritage committee for Blue plaques and is an ambassador for the Princes Teaching Institute.

=== Honorary doctorate ===
In 2010 Plymouth University awarded Graham-Dixon an honorary Doctorate of Arts.

=== Supporter of Young British Artists ===
He was an early supporter of the group later known as the Young British Artists. In 1990 he wrote:

Goldsmiths' graduates are unembarrassed about promoting themselves and their work: some of the most striking exhibitions in London over the past few months—"The East Country Yard Show", or "Gambler", both staged in docklands—have been independently organised and funded by Goldsmiths' graduates as showcases for their work. This has given them a reputation for pushiness, yet it should also be said that in terms of ambition, attention to display and sheer bravado there has been little to match such shows in the country's established contemporary art institutions. They were far superior, for instance, to any of the contemporary art shows that have been staged by the Liverpool Tate in its own multi-million-pound dockland site.

=== Cambridge Union speech ===
On 9 November 2021 Graham-Dixon was banned from speaking again at the Cambridge Union after a debate titled "This House Believes there is no such thing as good taste". Speaking in opposition to the motion, Graham-Dixon recited part of speech made by Adolf Hitler, on so-called degenerate art, including the lines: "this modern horrible art that was promoted by the Jews, which was Cubist, inspired by the art of the Negro, tribal art – yeurgh, how horrible is that". He later apologised for the impression and stated that he was trying to "underline the utterly evil nature of Hitler." He added: "I apologise sincerely to anyone who found my debating tactics and use of Hitler's own language distressing; on reflection I can see that some of the words I used, even in quotation, are inherently offensive."

Public figures including Louis de Bernières and John Cleese were among those to defend Graham-Dixon, and criticism of the Union's plans for an exclusion list prompted a U-turn from its president. In a statement to The Jewish Chronicle, fellow historian Guy Walters said: "The idea that Andrew Graham-Dixon has been blacklisted for performing what was clearly a satirical impression of Adolf Hitler is both disgraceful and deeply ironic." A full transcript of the speech was published by The Telegraph.

== Personal life ==
At school, in 1977, Graham-Dixon was selected to play football for the All-England Public and Grammar Schools XI and went on to captain the Old Westminsters F.C.. He now enjoys skiing, swimming and golf.

He is married and has lived in Nutley, East Sussex for ten years.

== Film and television credits ==
Film and television
Year	Title	Notes
1992	The Billboard Project	
1992	The Raft of the Medusa	First Prize in the Reportage Section of the Montreal International Film and Television Festival
1996	A History of British Art	Six-part series Nominated for BAFTA and RTS awards
1996	Hogarth's Progress	
1999	Renaissance	Six-part series Nominated for RTS award
2001	Art That Shook the World	Series 1 episode 1 "Monet's Impression Sunrise"
2002	Secret Lives of the Artists	Three-part series on Constable, Vermeer, Caravaggio
2002	The Elgin Marbles	Drama-documentary on the Elgin Marbles
2003	1000 Ways of Getting Drunk in England	
2004–2015	The Culture Show	
2005	The Secret of Drawing	Four-part series
2006	I, Samurai	
2006	The Real Casino Royale	
2006	100% English	
2007	The Battle for British Art	
2007	Art of Eternity	Three-part series on Christian art Long-listed for Grierson Awards
2008	Art of Spain	Three-part series
2008	Travels with Vasari	Two-part documentary exploring the life and work of the artist, architect and chronicler of the Italian Renaissance, Giorgio Vasari.
2008	The Medici: Makers of Modern Art	Documentary
2009	The Art of Russia	Three-part series
2009	Picasso	Culture Show Special
2010	Art of Germany	Three-part series
2011	Treasures of Heaven	Documentary about the British Museum exhibition on relics and reliquaries
2011	I Never Tell Anybody Anything: The Life and Art of Edward Burra	Documentary
2011	Art of America	Three-part series
2012	Sicily Unpacked	Three-part series presented with Italian chef Giorgio Locatelli.
2013	Italy Unpacked series 1	Three-part series presented with Italian chef Giorgio Locatelli.
2013	The High Art of the Low Countries	Three-part series
2014	Italy Unpacked series 2	Three-part series presented with Italian chef Giorgio Locatelli.
2014	Art of China	Three-part series
2014	The Art of Gothic: Britain's Midnight Hour	Three-part series
2014	Viking Art	Published by BBC and broadcast as part of BBC The Culture Show series
2014	British Art at War	Three-part series
2015	Italy Unpacked series 3	Three-part series presented with Italian chef Giorgio Locatelli.
2015	Secrets of the Mona Lisa	Documentary
2016	Art of Scandinavia	Three-part series
2017	Art of France	Three-part series
2018	Rome Unpacked	Two-part series presented with Italian chef Giorgio Locatelli.
2018	Art, Passion and Power: the Story of the Royal Collection	Four-part history of the Royal Collection.
2018	Stealing Van Gogh	Documentary
2019	Van Meegeren:—The Forger Who Fooled the Nazis	Documentary

== Written works ==
- Howard Hodgkin. London: Thames & Hudson, 1994 (ISBN 0-50027769-9); revised, 2001 (ISBN 0-50009298-2).
- John Virtue: New Paintings. Bristol: Arnolfini, 1995. ISBN 978-0-907738-41-1.
- Paper Museum: Writings About Painting, Mostly. London: HarperCollins, 1996. ISBN 0-00-255557-3.
- A History of British Art. London: BBC, 1996. ISBN 0-563-37044-0.
- Renaissance. London: BBC, 1999. ISBN 0-563-38396-8.
- In the Picture: The Year Through Art. London: Allen Lane, 2002. ISBN 978-0-7139-9675-3.
- Michelangelo and the Sistine Chapel. London: Weidenfeld & Nicolson, 2008. ISBN 978-0-297-85365-7.
- Caravaggio—A Life Sacred And Profane. London: Allen Lane, 2009. ISBN 978-0-7139-9674-6.
- Art: The Definitive Visual Guide. Dorling Kindersley Limited, 2023. ISBN 978-0-2416-2903-1
- Vermeer—A Life Lost and Found. London: Allen Lane, 2025. ISBN 978-1-84614-710-4

== DVD releases ==
- Art of Spain (2010)
- Art of Germany (2011)
- Art of China (2015)
- Art of America (2014)
- Italy Unpacked (2014)
- Sicily Unpacked (2014)
- Rome Unpacked (2018)
