= Art of Eternity =

- Title screenshot
- Genre: Documentary
- Presented by: Andrew Graham-Dixon
- Country of origin: United Kingdom
- Original language: English
- No. of series: 1
- No. of episodes: 3

Production
- Running time: 60 minutes

Original release
- Network: BBC Four
- Release: March 19, 2010

Art of Eternity is a series of 3 1-hour documentaries on Christian art presented by Andrew Graham-Dixon. It was first broadcast on BBC Four in 2007, and later repeated on BBC Two.

== Episode guide ==
1. Painting Paradise – The origins of Christian art in late antiquity, Coptic Egypt and medieval France, and its transition from classical art.
2. The Glory of Byzantium – Icons and the other Christian art of the Byzantine Empire.
3. When East Meets West – Early Christian art's development through the Middle Ages and Renaissance, and its influence on modern artists.
