= Tonightly =

- Created by: Objective Productions
- Presented by: Jason Manford
- Starring: Andi Osho
- Country of origin: United Kingdom
- Original language: English
- No. of series: 1
- No. of episodes: 16

Production
- Production location: The London Studios
- Running time: 30 minutes

Original release
- Network: Channel 4
- Release: 1 August – 22 August 2008

Tonightly is a British comedy entertainment show presented by comedian Jason Manford. It was part of the Generation Next project on Channel 4 and was shown late evening, every weekday. The series concluded on 22 August 2008. The TNT Show, hosted by Jack Whitehall, was essentially a revamped second series of Tonightly.

== The show ==
Tonightly featured a variety of new comic performers, providing a daily dose of satirical news, comment and all-round silliness.

== Production ==
Each episode was recorded 2–5 hours before broadcast to ensure the news and discussions were up to date. It was filmed in Studio 3 at The London Studios.
