= Ian Fleming: Where Bond Began =

Ian Fleming: Where Bond Began was a 2008 documentary presented by Joanna Lumley which explored the life of the author Ian Fleming and the origin of his character James Bond. It was first broadcast on BBC One at 6:10 p.m. on Sunday 19 October 2008 and was commissioned to celebrate the 100th anniversary of Fleming's birth and the then forthcoming release of the film Quantum of Solace.

== Content ==
The programme begins with Joanna Lumley narrating an account of Ian Fleming's mission to Occupied France in June 1940. Lumley visits Fleming's childhood home Joyce Grove in Oxfordshire. While at the country house, Lumley talks to Ben Mcintrye, who had written a biography of Fleming. They discuss Fleming's style and inspiration for his books. Lumley visits Eton College's library and talks to the Librarian Micheal Meredith about Fleming's time at Eton and his tense relationship with his housemaster E.V. Slater. Meredith shows Lumley, Fleming's first published work “The Ordeal of Caryl St. George” which was released in The Wyvern magazine of which Fleming was an editor.

Between Lumley's visits and interviews, Footage from the EON Bond films and passages from Fleming's Bond books including Casino Royale, From Russia with Love and For Your Eyes Only are voiced by Jonathan Pryce. Lumley narrates Fleming's time at Reuters news agency and Fleming's trip to Soviet Union to cover the Metro-Vickers Affair in 1933. Fleming decided to leave journalism as he wanted better pay and became a stockbroker which he was unsuccessful at.

In 1939, Fleming became Assistant to the Director of Naval Intelligence, Admiral John Godfrey. Lumley talks with Sebastian Faulks in Horse Guards Parade and discuss Fleming's journalistic writing style of short sentences which create action. Lumley discusses Fleming's relationship with Ann Chateris, who at the time was married to Lord O'Neill to whom she had two children. Ann was also having an affair with Esmond Harmsworth, Viscount Rothermere. Fleming also had numerous affairs.

Lumley travels to Jamaica. After the war ended, Fleming built a small bungalow which he named “Goldeneye”. Frequent visitors were Noel Coward and also the newly married Ann, who had married Rothermere after O’Neill died in action in 1944. Fleming became the Foreign Editor for The Times. The Rothermeres divorced in 1952, after which Ian and Ann married in Jamaica. Fleming started to write Casino Royale, the first Bond novel which was inspired by his past experiences. In 1953, Casino Royale was published and the Fleming's only child together was born who they named Casper. After the success of his first novel, Fleming wrote one Bond novel per year.

In 1962, Fleming had a heart attack. Ann Fleming “confiscated Ian's typewriter” and so Fleming wrote by hand a story for his son, Chitty Chitty Bang Bang. Despite his poor health, Fleming continued to drink alcohol and smoke cigarettes heavily.

Lumley travels to the Royal St George's Golf Club in Kent. Lumley meets Fionn Morgan, Ann's daughter and Fleming's step-daughter, they discuss Ann and Ian's relationship and recounts the story when the Flemings were staying at a countryside house and had an argument which ended in Ann leaving and reversing her car into Fleming's Ford Thunderbird.

The dying Fleming wrote a first draft of The Man with the Golden Gun however Fleming died in mid 1964 before he finalised the novel. The documentary ends with Lumley sitting at Goldeneye commenting on Fleming's "extraordinary" life.
