= The Undercover Soldier =

- Genre: Current affairs
- Presented by: Russell Sharp
- Country of origin: United Kingdom

Production
- Executive producer: Clive Edwards
- Producer: Karen Wightman
- Running time: 60 minutes

Original release
- Network: BBC One
- Release: 18 September 2008

The Undercover Soldier is a 2008 BBC documentary which investigated bullying in the British Army in the wake of the Deepcut enquiry. For the programme, BBC journalist Russell Sharp went undercover as a soldier, enrolling in the army for six months basic training at the Infantry Training Centre, at the Catterick Garrison in Yorkshire. The one-hour programme was shown on BBC One on Thursday 18 September 2008 at 9:00pm.

The programme did not show any filmed evidence of ill treatment, although Sharp himself claimed to have witnessed several incidents of bullying. The documentary led to the suspension of five instructors based at the camp. The show attracted relatively low ratings and the BBC was criticised by serving soldiers for the way the investigation was conducted.
