= Duddleswell =

Village in East Sussex, England

Coordinates: 51°01′55″N 0°05′31″E

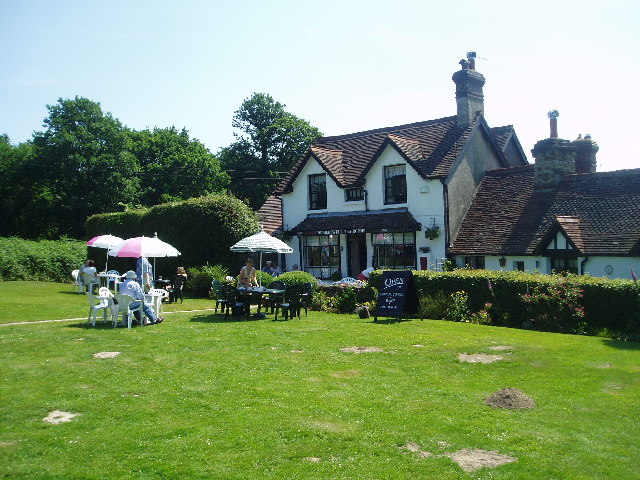
Tea rooms at Duddleswell

Duddleswell is a village in the Wealden district, East Sussex in England, United Kingdom.
