= Art of Spain (TV series) =

- DVD cover
- Genre: Documentary
- Presented by: Andrew Graham-Dixon
- Country of origin: United Kingdom
- Original language: English
- No. of series: 1
- No. of episodes: 3

Production
- Running time: 60 minutes

Original release
- Network: BBC Four
- Release: 31 January – 14 February 2008

Art of Spain is a BBC Four documentary series on Spanish art presented by Andrew Graham-Dixon. It consists of three one-hour episodes, and premiered on 31 January 2008.

== Episodes ==
No.	Title	Original release date
1	"The Moorish South"	31 January 2008
Art in Muslim and Christian Spain from 711 to 1492.
2	"The Dark Heart"	7 February 2008
16th and 17th century Spanish art.
3	"The Mystical North"	14 February 2008
Art in northern Spain, from Goya to Picasso, and the present and future of Spanish art.

== Reception ==
Rosie Jackson of Open Magazine said that "the programme proffers the best bits of Spanish art minus the tourists and the baking heat", and that the series is "undoubtedly a visual feast; low-brow, but none the worse for that."

"If only all presenters were as good as Andrew Graham-Dixon." Continuing her praise for the host of the series, Serena Davies of The Daily Telegraph said that his "genial, eloquent presence was an asset to even the most over-familiar shot of the Alhambra."

Graham-Dixon followed Art of Spain with a number of similarly titled series, covering the Art of Russia, Germany, America, China, Scandinavia and France.
