= Jamie's Ministry of Food =

2008 British television series

- Created by: Jamie Oliver
- Presented by: Jamie Oliver
- Country of origin: United Kingdom
- No. of seasons: 1
- No. of episodes: 4

Production
- Running time: 60 minutes

Original release
- Network: Channel 4
- Release: 30 September – 21 October 2008

Jamie's Ministry of Food is a four-part Jamie Oliver food docu-series that aired from 30 September to 21 October 2008, following his attempts to teach basic cooking skills to residents in Rotherham. The title of the show is a play on the Ministry of Food that existed during the Second World War to help people eat well despite food rationing. A companion cookbook of the same name was also released.

The show attempted to be premised on the principle of Oliver's 'Pass It On' campaign, with the idea that teaching local townspeople a selection of recipes and skills would see them passing those on to family members and friends and thereby cause an exponential growth.
