= List of programmes broadcast by Sky One =

Sky One had commissioned many homegrown programmes since it first started broadcasting back in 1984 but it was not until 1989 that content went beyond music and children's programming. During the early years, new game shows included a few series of Blockbusters and Spellbound, along with The Price Is Right and Sale of the Century. Original dramas include Dream Team, a series based on a fictional football team; The Strangerers, a science fiction sitcom that was dropped after one series and never repeated; Al Murray's sitcom Time Gentlemen Please; and Baddiel's Syndrome. Hex, another sci-fi show, proved popular but was cancelled in April 2006, and Mile High also proved quite popular but only lasted from 2003 to 2005. Sky One commissioned Terry Pratchett's Hogfather for Christmas 2006, which proved to be their most successful programme ever. Following that success, Sky brought out in 2008 an adaptation of The Colour of Magic and its second half The Light Fantastic, and in 2010 Terry Pratchett's Going Postal, the 33rd book in the Discworld series. Sky also co-produced The 4400 and co-financed the first series of Battlestar Galactica.

The channel shut down on 1 September 2021, with its channel number taken by Sky Showcase and much of its content library moved to Sky Max. Sky One relaunched on 24 February 2026, with the content from Sky Showcase and Sky Max moving to Sky One.

This is a list of television programmes broadcast by Sky One in the United Kingdom and Ireland.

== Current programming ==
=== Unscripted ===
==== Reality ====
- The Dyers' Caravan Park (2026–present)
- Rob & Romesh Vs (series 9) (Note: Moved from Sky Max)

==== Variety ====
- Saturday Night Live UK (2026–present)

=== Acquired programming ===
- Animal Control (series 3–present) (Note: Moved from E4)
- Bear Grylls Is Running Wild (series 9) (Note: Moved from Disney+)
- Best Medicine
- The 'Burbs
- From (series 4–present)
- Grimsburg
- Last Week Tonight with John Oliver (series 13) (Note: Moved from Sky Comedy)
- New Zealand Spy
- The Paper (series 2)
- Rooster
- Saturday Night Live (series 51–present)
- Slo Pitch
- S.W.A.T. Exiles
- The Walking Dead: Dead City (series 3)

== Upcoming programming ==
=== Comedy drama ===
- The Trip (series 5; December 2026) (Note: Previously aired under the original Sky One)
- Force & Majeure (TBA)
- Mr. Bigstuff (series 3; TBA)

=== Unscripted ===
==== Game shows ====
- Never Mind the Buzzcocks (series 34; December 2026)

==== Reality ====
- The 100 Day Split (2027)
- John Bishop's Comedy Night at The Coliseum (2027)

=== Acquired programming ===
- Dig (December 2026)
- Ted: The Animated Series (December 2026)
- Baywatch (January 2027)
- The Walking Dead: Daryl Dixon (series 4; TBA)

== Former programming ==
=== Unscripted ===
==== Reality ====
- Gemma Collins: Everything. All At Once. (2026)
- The Wargame (2026)

=== Acquired programming ===
- Surviving Earth
- Ted (series 2)

== Second-run programming ==
The majority of programming listed below previously aired on other Sky UK channels. The list includes both Sky originals and acquired programming.

- Agatha Raisin
- Andor (Note: Previously aired on Disney+)
- An Idiot Abroad
- Back (Note: Previously aired on Channel 4)
- Brassic
- Evil
- The Flash
- Grimm
- Hawaii Five-0
- Intelligence
- Joe Lycett's United States of Birmingham
- La Brea (Note: Previously aired on Paramount+)
- A League of Their Own
- Magnum P.I.
- NCIS: Los Angeles
- The Office
- Police 24/7
- The Simpsons
- Stargate SG-1
- Superstore
- S.W.A.T.
- UFO
- The Walking Dead
- Will & Grace

== Programming during 1982–2021 ==
The shows listed below were still on the air at the time of Sky One's closure in September 2021, with future series moved to Sky Max, Sky Comedy, and Sky Showcase.

=== Moved to Sky Max ===
- A League of Their Own (series 1–15; 2010–21)
- Agatha Raisin (series 1–3; 2016–20) (Note: Co-production with Acorn TV for series 2–3)
- The Russell Howard Hour (series 1–4; 2017–20)
- A Discovery of Witches (series 1–2; 2018–21)
- Rob & Romesh Vs (series 1–3; 2019–21)
- Brassic (series 1–2; 2019–20)
- Temple (series 1; 2019)
- Frayed (series 1; 2019) (Note: Co-production with ABC TV)
- COBRA (series 1; 2020)
- Dating No Filter (series 1; 2021)

Acquired programming

- The Blacklist (series 1–8)
- The Flash (series 1–6)
- The Flight Attendant (series 1)
- Legends of Tomorrow (series 1–5)
- Magnum P.I. (series 1–3)
- Manifest (series 1–2)
- NCIS: Los Angeles (series 1–12)
- NCIS: New Orleans (series 1–6)
- Resident Alien (series 1)
- SEAL Team (series 1–4)
- Supergirl (series 1–5)
- S.W.A.T. (series 1–4)
- Warrior (series 1–2)

=== Moved to Sky Comedy ===
- Avenue 5 (series 1; 2020) (Note: Co-production with HBO)
- Intelligence (series 1–2; 2020–21)
- Breeders (series 1–2; 2020–21) (Note: Co-production with FX)
- Code 404 (series 1; 2020)
- Hitmen (series 1; 2020)

=== Moved to Sky Showcase ===
- Moominvalley (series 1–2; 2019–20) (Note: Co-production with Yle TV2)

Acquired programming

- All Hail King Julien
- Cleopatra in Space
- Dawn of the Croods
- DreamWorks Dragons: Rescue Riders
- Home: Adventures with Tip & Oh
- Madagascar: A Little Wild
- The Mighty Ones
- The Simpsons
- Trolls: TrollsTopia

=== Former programming ===
The shows listed below had either concluded or moved to a different channel by the time of Sky One's closure in September 2021.

==== 0–9 ====
- The 10th Kingdom
- The 2nd Annual Stuntman Awards
- 2000 Malibu Road
- 21 Jump Street
- 227
- 24
- 3rd Rock from the Sun
- The 4400

==== A–G ====
- According to Jim
- Action Man
- The Addams Family
- The Adventures of Ozzie and Harriet
- Adventures of Superman
- The Adventures of Tintin
- After Hours
- ALF
- Alias
- Alice
- Alien Nation
- All in the Family
- All-Star Cup (series 1) (Note: Moved to ITV)
- All Star Wrestling
- All You Need Is Love
- The Amazing Spider-Man
- Amen
- American Gladiators
- American Sex
- The American Show
- American Sports Cavalcade
- America's Dumbest Criminals
- Andromeda
- Angel
- Angela and Friends
- Animal World
- Animated Classic
- Another World
- Are You Smarter than a 10 Year Old?
- Arrow
- The Artistry of Angel Romero
- The Arts Channel
- Ask Dr. Ruth
- At Home with the Hattons
- Badger or Bust
- Bailey's Bird
- Batman
- Battlestar Galactica (1978)
- Battlestar Galactica (2004)
- The Betty White Show
- The Beverly Hillbillies
- Beverly Hills, 90210
- Bewitched
- Beyond 2000
- The Big Easy
- Big Ron Manager
- The Big Spell
- The Big Valley
- The Biggest Loser
- Bill Bailey's Birdwatching Bonanza
- The Bionic Woman
- Black Sheep Squadron
- Blackadder: Back and Forth
- Blam!!!
- Bliss
- Blockbusters
- Bloomfield
- Blue Thunder
- The Bob Newhart Show
- Boiled Egg and Soldiers
- Bonanza
- Bones (series 1–5) (Note: Moved to Sky Living)
- Boney
- Born Free
- Bounty Hunters
- Boston Legal
- Barrier Reef
- The Brady Bunch
- Brave New World
- Brainiac: History Abuse
- Brainiac: Science Abuse
- Brainiac's Test Tube Baby
- Breaking Away
- Bring 'Em Back Alive
- Bring the Noise
- British Open
- British Sex
- British Tribes
- Batman: The Animated Series
- Branded
- Brookside
- Buffy the Vampire Slayer
- Bulletproof
- Bump in the Night
- The Business Programme
- The Café
- Candid Camera
- Can't Hurry Love
- The Cape
- Captain Scarlet and the Mysterons
- Car 54, Where Are You
- The Carol Burnett Show
- Championship Auto Racing Teams
- Cash and Company
- Castaway
- Chances
- Carnage
- Celebrity Showtime
- Charlie's Angels
- The Chicago Code
- Chicago Hope
- China Beach
- Chopper Squad
- Chris Evans Breakfast Show
- Chuck Connors' Great Western Theatre
- CI5: The New Professionals
- Cimarron City
- Cirque de Celebrité
- The Cisco Kid
- The City
- City Lights
- Classic Concentration
- The Coca-Cola Eurochart Top 50 Show
- Cold Case
- Colony
- Coppers
- Count Duckula
- Countdown
- A Country Practice
- Crash Palace
- Critical
- Cruise with Stelios
- CSI: Crime Scene Investigation
- CSI: Miami
- Curfew
- Custer
- Cybersix
- Dakar Rally
- Daniel Boone
- Davis Cup on TV
- Dawson's Creek
- Deadly Ernest Horror Show
- Dead Like Me
- Deadwood
- Delfy and His Friends
- Delicious
- Dennis the Menace (1959)
- Dennis the Menace (1986)
- The Deputy
- Desi Rascals (series 2) (Note: Moved from Sky Living)
- Designing Women
- Detective School
- Dexter
- Diana: Her True Story
- Dilbert
- Dirty Money
- The DJ Kat Show
- Doctor Doctor
- Don't Forget the Lyrics! (UK)
- Don't Forget the Lyrics! (US)
- Double Dragon
- The Double Life of Henry Phyfe
- Dow Chemical Tennis Classic
- Down Under Show
- Dragnet
- Dragon Booster
- Dream Team
- The Drew Carey Show
- Duck Quacks Don't Echo
- Due South
- Dynasty
- E Street
- Early Edition
- Earth: Final Conflict
- Earthfile
- East of Eden
- The Ed Sullivan Show
- Ed vs. Spencer
- Eight is Enough
- Emerald Point N.A.S.
- Emergency!
- Entertainment This Week
- Entertainment Tonight UK
- Equal Justice
- ER
- European Business Channel
- The Faith Tour
- Falcon Crest
- Falcon Island
- Family
- Family Affair
- Family Guy
- Family Hours
- Family Matters
- Family Theatre
- Family Ties
- Fantasy Island
- Fashion TV
- Fat Families
- Father Knows Best
- Father of the Pride
- Fear Factor (UK)
- Fear Factor (US)
- The Ferry Aid Gala
- Final Chance to Save
- First Wave
- The Flash (1990)
- Flash Gordon
- Flying Kiwi
- The Flying Nun
- Football Icon
- Football Years
- Forever
- Forever Knight
- Franklin
- Freaks and Geeks
- Freddy's Nightmares
- Free Spirit
- Free Willy
- Friday Classic
- Friends
- Fringe
- From Here to Eternity
- Full House
- Fun Factory
- Futurama (series 1–7) (Note: Moved to Disney+)
- Gabriel's Fire
- Ghoul Lashed
- The Game of the Century
- Games World
- Gamezville
- Garfield and Friends
- Gemini Man
- Get Smart
- The Ghost & Mrs. Muir
- Ghost Story
- Gidget
- A Gift to Last
- Gilligan's Island
- Gladiators
- Glee
- Golden Soak
- Good Morning Scandinavia
- Good Times
- Good vs. Evil
- Goodwill Games
- Grand Prix Wieler Revue
- Grease: The School Musical
- Great Moments of Wrestling
- The Greatest American Hero
- Green Acres
- The Green Hornet
- Grey's Anatomy
- Growing Pains
- Guiding Stars
- Gun Law
- The Guns of Will Sonnett
- Gunsmoke
- Guyana Tragedy: The Story of Jim Jones

==== H–N ====
- Happy Days
- Hawaii Five-0 (1969)
- Hawaii Five-0 (2010)
- Hawk
- Hairspray: The School Musical
- Harry Enfield's Brand Spanking New Show
- Hart to Hart
- Hazel
- Headline News
- The Heist
- Hex
- Hey Dad..!
- Higher Ground
- Highlander: The Animated Series
- Highlander: The Series
- Hill Street Blues
- Hogan's Heroes
- Hollywood Close-Up
- Hollywood Sex
- Hollywood Wives
- The Honeymooners
- Hooten & the Lady
- Horse Report
- Hot Summer Down Under
- Hour of Power
- House
- Howdy Doody
- The Human Face of China
- Hunter
- I Dream of Jeannie
- I Love Lucy
- An Idiot Abroad
- In Living Color
- In the Long Run
- The Incredible Hulk
- Intergalactic
- International Indoor Football
- International MotorSports
- International Survivor of the Fittest
- Is Harry on the Boat?
- Ivanhoe
- Jake 2.0
- Jamestown
- The Jeffersons
- Jem
- Jeopardy!
- Jett
- Joe 90
- Journey to the Unknown
- Journeyman
- Katie
- Keeping Up with the Kardashians
- King of the Hill (series 1–13)
- Kirsty's Home Videos
- Knights and Warriors
- Kong: The Animated Series
- Kung Fu
- Kung Fu: The Legend Continues
- Lady Lovely Locks and the Pixietails
- Land of the Giants
- Last Resort
- The Last Ship
- Las Vegas
- Laverne & Shirley
- Law & Order
- Learned Friends
- Legends
- Levkas Man
- Lie to Me
- Limitless
- The Life and Times of Grizzly Adams
- Little House on the Prairie
- The Live 6 Show
- Live from London
- Live WINNERS Show
- Living the Dream
- Liza & Huey's Pet Nation
- Lois & Clark: The New Adventures of Superman
- Lonesome Dove
- Looney Tunes' Cartoon Classics
- Long Play
- Lost
- Lost in Space
- Love at First Sight
- Loveland
- The Lucy–Desi Comedy Hour
- The Lucy Show
- MacGyver
- Mad About You
- Made in Germany
- The Magician
- Malcolm in the Middle
- Malo Korrigan
- Manimal
- Married... with Children
- The Mary Tyler Moore Show
- M*A*S*H
- Matt Helm
- Max Magic
- McHale's Navy
- Meego
- Mega Babies
- The Megan Mullally Show
- Melrose Place
- Men in Trees
- Mighty Morphin' Power Rangers
- Mile High
- Mister Ed
- The Moaning of Life
- Models Inc.
- Modern Family
- The Monkees
- Moone Boy
- Moonlight
- Moonlighting
- Mork & Mindy
- Morning Glory
- Motorsport News
- Movie Classic
- Movietime
- Movin' On
- Mr. Personality
- Mummies Alive!
- The Munsters
- The Muppets
- Muppets Tonight
- Murphy Brown
- Music Box
- Must Be the Music
- Mutant X
- My Favorite Martian
- My Kitchen Rules
- My Little Pony
- My Little Pony Tales
- My Pet Monster
- My Three Sons
- The Nanny
- Nanny and the Professor
- The Nature of Things
- NCAA on TV
- The New Candid Camera
- The New Dick Van Dyke Show
- Newhart
- NFL American Football
- NHL Ice Hockey
- Night Man
- Ninja Warrior
- Nip/Tuck
- NSWRL Premiership on TV
- NYPD Blue

==== O–U ====
- Oliver Beene
- Once and Again
- One West Waikiki
- Oops TV
- Orson and Olivia
- The Outer Limits (1963)
- The Outer Limits (1995)
- The Outsiders
- Pacific Blue
- Pacific Palisades
- Paradise Beach
- Parents
- Parker Lewis Can't Lose
- The Partridge Family
- Passions
- Pathfinders
- The Paul Hogan Show
- Petticoat Junction
- PGA Tour
- Phantom 2040
- The Phoenix Team
- Phyllis
- The PJs
- Pokémon
- Police Stop!
- Police Story
- Police Woman
- Poltergeist: The Legacy
- Pop Formule
- The Pop Years
- Popples
- Popular
- Porno Valley
- Port Charles
- The Pretender
- The Price Is Right
- Prison Break
- Private Practice
- Prodigal Son
- Project Catwalk
- Quantum Leap
- The Quest
- The Race Against Time
- Raising Hope
- Red Shoe Diaries
- Reds in Europe
- Relic Hunter
- The Reluctant Landlord
- Renegade
- Rescue 911
- Rescue Heroes
- Rescue Me
- Revolution
- Rhoda
- Riptide
- Ritter's Cove
- Robin of Sherwood
- RoboCop: The Series
- Robot Wars
- Roger Ramjet
- Roots
- The Ropers
- Ross Kemp on Gangs
- Ross Kemp's Extreme World
- Ross Kemp on Pirates
- Ross Kemp in Afghanistan
- Ross Kemp Return to Afghanistan
- Ross Kemp Back on the Frontline
- Roswell Conspiracies
- Roswell High
- Roughnecks: Starship Troopers Chronicles
- The Round Table
- Roving Report
- Rush
- Ryan's Hope
- Sale of the Century
- The Sally Jessy Raphael Show
- Sanford and Son
- Sara
- Saturday Movie Matinée
- Saturday Night Main Event
- Scrubs
- The Secret Video Show
- Seinfeld
- Seven Little Australians
- Sha Na Na
- Shadow Raiders
- The Sharon Osbourne Show
- Shasta McNasty
- Shock Treatment
- Shōgun
- Sick Note
- Sick of It
- Sightings
- Silk Stalkings
- Skellig
- Skippy the Bush Kangaroo
- Ski Report
- Skiboy
- Sky By Day
- Sky One Undun
- Sky Star Search
- Sky Trax
- Sky-Fi
- Skyways
- Slammy Award
- Sliders
- Small Wonder
- Snow Report
- Soft N Romantic
- Soldier Soldier
- Something Is Out There
- Son of the Beach
- The Sonny & Cher Comedy Hour
- South Park
- Space: Above and Beyond
- Space Island One
- Space Precinct
- Space Shopping
- Spartacus
- Special Friends
- Speed
- Spellbound
- Sport Aid
- Spring Movie Festival
- Springhill
- Spy
- St. Elsewhere
- Stan Lee's Lucky Man
- Standby...Lights! Camera! Action!
- Standoff
- Star Fleet
- Star Theatre
- Star Trek: Deep Space Nine
- Star Trek: Enterprise
- Star Trek: The Next Generation
- Star Trek: The Original Series
- Star Trek: Voyager
- Stargate Atlantis
- Stargate Infinity
- Stargate SG-1
- Stargate Universe
- Starlings
- Starsky & Hutch
- Stingray (1964)
- Stingray (1985)
- Strike Back
- The Strangerers
- Studs
- Suddenly Susan
- The Sullivans
- Summer Uncovered
- SummerSlam
- The Sun Military Awards
- Sunday Movie
- Sunday Movie Matinée
- Sunday Night Movie
- Sunset Beach
- Superboy
- Superhuman Samurai Syber Squad
- Superstars of Wrestling
- Survivor Series
- Stop Search Seize
- Super Bowl
- Swiss Family Robinson
- The Swiss Family Robinson
- Tabitha
- Tales from the Crypt
- Tales of Wells Fargo
- Tandarra
- Tarzan: The Epic Adventures
- Taste
- Tattooed Teenage Alien Fighters from Beverly Hills
- Teech
- Teenage Mutant Hero Turtles
- Terra Nova
- Terry Pratchett's The Colour of Magic
- Terry Pratchett's Going Postal
- Terry Pratchett's Hogfather
- There's Something About Miriam
- Thorne
- Three's Company
- Threshold
- Thrill Seekers
- Thrillmaker Sports
- Through the Keyhole
- Thunderbirds
- Time Gentlemen Please
- The Time Tunnel
- Titus
- Tom Jones
- The Tommy Hunter Show
- Top End Down Under
- Total Recall 2070
- Touch
- Tour de Suisse
- The Transformers
- Transformers: Armada
- Trans World Sport
- The Trip (series 4) (Note: Moved from Sky Atlantic. Continued under the relaunched Sky One)
- Trollied
- Tru Calling
- TV Years
- The Tyra Banks Show
- Unsolved Mysteries
- The Untouchables (1959)
- The Untouchables (1993)
- U.S.F.L. Football

==== V–Z ====
- V
- V: The Final Battle
- Været i Europa
- Vegas
- VFL Australian Rules Football
- The Villa
- Voyagers!
- VR.5
- Vroom Vroom
- Wagon Train
- Walker, Texas Ranger
- Wall of Fame
- The Wanderer
- Wayne and Shuster
- The Wayans Bros.
- We Can Rebuild You
- Weather Report
- Wednesday Classics
- Weeds
- Werewolf
- The West Wing
- What about Mimi?
- What's Happening!!
- What's Happening Now!!
- Where's Wally?
- Wild Things
- Woman's Day
- Wonderfalls
- The Word
- World Cup Report
- World Games
- The World Global Video Awards
- World Music Video Awards
- The World Tomorrow
- WrestleMania
- WWE After Burn (Note: Moved to Sky Sports Action)
- WWE Bottom Line
- WWE Experience
- WWE Heat
- WWE SmackDown!
- WWE Tough Enough
- WWF Action Zone
- WWF All-American Wrestling
- WWF Championship Wrestling
- WWF Jakked/Metal
- WWF LiveWire
- WWF Mania
- WWF Shotgun Saturday Night
- WWF Superstars of Wrestling
- WWF Wrestling Challenge
- The X-Files
- Xena: Warrior Princess
- The Young Doctors
- Young Ramsay
- You, Me and the Apocalypse
- You've Come a Long Way, Katie
- Yu-Gi-Oh!
- Yu-Gi-Oh! 5D's
- The Zeta Project
- Zoids
- Zoo
