= Brainiac (disambiguation) =

Brainiac is a supervillain owned by DC Comics.

Brainiac may also refer to:

== Culture ==
=== Fictional entities ===
- Brainiac (story arc), a 2008 storyline in Action Comics
- Brainiac (Smallville), a version of the villain in the TV series Smallville
- Vril Dox also known as Brainiac 2, a DC Comics character
- Brainiac 4, the parent of Brainiac 5
- Brainiac 5, a member of the Legion of Super-Heroes
- Brainiac 8, a superheroine of the Outsiders, who turned into a supervillainess

=== Television ===
- Brainiac: Science Abuse, a 2003–2008 British television programme, and its spin-offs:
  - Brainiac: History Abuse, aired in 2005
  - Brainiac's Test Tube Baby, aired in 2006–2007
- "Brainiac" (Dark Angel), an episode of the television series Dark Angel

=== Other uses in culture ===
- Brainiac (band), an American indie rock band in the 1990s, from Dayton, Ohio
- The Brainiac, a 1962 Mexican horror film directed by Chano Urueta
- Brainiac: Adventures in the Curious, Competitive, Compulsive World of Trivia Buffs, a book written by Ken Jennings

== Other uses ==
- Function BRAINIAC, an energy drink, for improving brain function
- Brainiac techniques for improving computer performance, in technology

== See also ==
- Geniac, an educational toy billed as a computer
