= Jon Tickle =

British television presenter

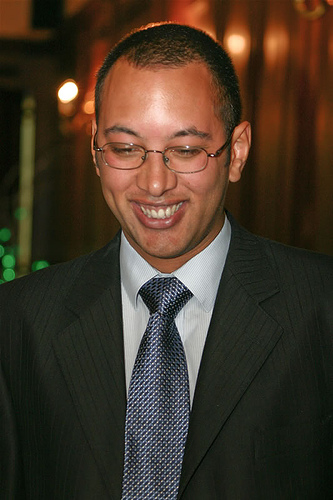
- Tickle in 2007
- Born: Norwich, Norfolk, England
- Education: University of Leicester
- Years active: 1991–2018
- Television: Blockbusters; Big Brother; Brainiac Science Abuse; Brainiac's Test Tube Baby

Jon Tickle is a British television presenter. After appearing on Blockbusters in 1991, he initially rose to fame as a contestant on the fourth series of the British television show Big Brother, on which he sporadically appeared thereafter. He also co-presented on the Sky One television series Brainiac between 2003 and 2008.

== Biography ==
Tickle grew up in Norwich with his twin brother and attended Avenue Middle School and Earlham High School. He appeared on Blockbusters in 1991. After graduating with a degree in physics from the University of Leicester in 1996, he moved to Staines-upon-Thames and worked as a data strategy manager. In 2003, he appeared on the fourth series of Big Brother; he was evicted on Day 29 but was voted back into the house as a non-competing guest two weeks before the end of the series. His excitement for all things dull led several newspapers to describe him as such, with The Guardian describing him as "quite possibly the most boring man in the universe"; however the Institute of Physics offered him a year's free membership as they felt he had "raised the national profile of physicists" and a religion was set up devoted to his worship, The Church of Jon Tickle. He returned to his day job and declined most media opportunities after leaving the programme.

Tickle co-presented Sky One science show Brainiac: Science Abuse between 2003 and 2008, as well as its spin-off Brainiac's Test Tube Baby in 2006. His colleagues included Richard Hammond, Vic Reeves, Charlotte Hudson, and Test Tube Baby's Dominic Wood. He filmed the show during his annual leave and promoted it by winning an episode of Distraction. During one episode, Tickle walked on a swimming pool full of custard powder and water, which he was able to do as cornstarch-based custard is a non-Newtonian fluid, meaning its viscosity changed as a result of the pressure of him walking on it; after he stopped, production staff had to free him. Other experiments conducted during the series included making toast with a blowtorch, making vicars eat poppy seeds to see if their stool tested positive for narcotics, and blowing up caravans. Tickle criticised participants in a Times Higher Education poll for voting Big Brother the show most responsible for dumbing down British culture in 2003 and presented the science podcast Tickle's Army in 2007.

Following Brainiac's cancellation, he worked for British Gas as their data strategy manager and then their enterprise information architect, spending two years living in Cardiff Bay while working for the firm. He later moved to Centrica as the head of their ServiceNow platform and patronised the Science and Technology Regional Organisation in Surrey. Tickle made a further appearance on Big Brother in 2015 as part of a time warp task and appeared on the franchise's Bit on the Side in September 2018 as part of a studio audience full of Big Brother alumni. He said in 2018 that he wished that colleagues would introduce him as "an excellent enterprise information architect", rather than as someone who had walked on custard. After retiring from Centrica in late 2025, he announced in September 2026 that he had been diagnosed with motor neurone disease and that he planned to cycle up the Col du Galibier to raise money for the MND Association. He reunited with most of his Big Brother co-stars at a lunch in London in November.
