= Uncovered (TV series) =

- Genre: Documentary
- Country of origin: United Kingdom
- Original language: English
- No. of series: 7
- No. of episodes: 56 (inc. 4 specials)

Production
- Running time: 60 minutes (inc. adverts)
- Production company: LWT

Original release
- Network: Sky One
- Release: 6 July 1997 – 26 May 2002

Uncovered was a British documentary show that was broadcast on Sky One from 6 July 1997 to 26 May 2002.

== Transmissions ==
=== Series ===
Series	Start date	End date	Episodes	Location
1	6 July 1997	24 August 1997	8	Ibiza
2	1 February 1998	22 March 1998	8	Caribbean
3	9 August 1998	27 September 1998	8	Greece
4	28 February 1999	18 April 1999	8	Miami
5	19 September 1999	7 November 1999	8	Tenerife
6	1 October 2000	19 November 2000	8	Ibiza
7	20 May 2001	24 June 2001	6	Las Vegas
8	7 April 2002	26 May 2002	8	Australia

=== Specials ===
Date	Entitle
24 August 1997	Ibiza Uncovered Reunion
23 December 1998	Christmas Uncovered
29 December 2001	Christmas Parties Uncovered (Part 1)
30 December 2001	Christmas Parties Uncovered (Part 2)
