= Charlotte Hudson =

British actress (born 1972)

- Born: 4 January 1972 (age 54); Sheffield, England, UK
- Occupations: Actress; presenter
- Years active: 1999–present

Charlotte Hudson (born 4 January 1972) is a British actress and television presenter. Hudson was born in Sheffield. Her brother is actor Robert Hudson.

== Education and early career ==
After attending Fitzwilliam College, Cambridge, Hudson started in television co-presenting BBC's Watchdog with Anne Robinson, replacing Alice Beer in 1999. She presented What's the Story- and Are You Being Cheated for Channel 5.

== Career ==
She presented the Sky One television series Brainiac: History Abuse, a spin-off from the award-winning Brainiac: Science Abuse, which she also co-presented. Hudson has also appeared as an actress in various UK TV shows. She appeared as a guest on both Big Brother's Little Brother and Big Brother's Big Mouth.

Hudson also appeared in the sketch show Bruiser opposite Mitchell & Webb, Olivia Colman, Martin Freeman and Matthew Holness. She was one half of comedy sketch double act Two Left Hands with comedian Leila Hackett, performing at the Edinburgh Festival Fringe in August 2007 and 2009.

In summer 2009, Hudson provided the in-game voiceover for the ITV show Divided. Between 2010 and 2012, she narrated the ITVBe programme Dinner Date.
