= Stop Search Seize =

Irish revenue/customs TV program

Stop Search Seize is a 20-part Irish television programme that was shown on Sky1 from 1 September 2015, concerning the work of the Irish Revenue and Customs service at Irelands’ airports, sea ports, and postal sorting offices.

It was also broadcast on the New Zealand television channel Bravo.
