= Function Drinks =

Functional beverage company based in Los Angeles, California

- Company type: Privately Owned
- Industry: Beverages
- Founded: 2004
- Founder: Alex Hughes, Dayton Miller, Josh Simon, Will Harbin
- Headquarters: Los Angeles, California
- Products: See products section
- Revenue: US$10 Million (est.) (2007)
- Number of employees: 50
- Website: Function Drinks

Function Drinks is a Functional Beverage company based in Los Angeles, California. The company was founded in 2004 by spine surgeon Dr. Alex Hughes, along with Josh Simon and Dayton Miller. The team launched their first product, Urban Detox, in Southern California in 2005.

In January 2008, Function Drinks was named the "Overall Best New Product" and "Best Functional Beverage" of 2007 by BevNET. Function is distributed nationally in Whole Foods, Target, and other retail chains.

== Functional Platforms ==
Function Drinks bottles

=== Function: ALTERNATIVE ENERGY ===
- Functionality: sustained released energy, typically lasts 1 to 2 hours
- Flavor: Citrus Yuzu (Replacing Tangerine Yuzu), Strawberry Guava
- Key ingredients: Muira puama, Epimedium, Catuaba, and Yerba mate

=== Function: BRAINIAC ===
- Functionality: Improve brain function
- Flavor: Carambola Punch
- Key ingredients: N-Acetyle-Cysteine, Vitamin E as Mixed tocopherols, Zinc Picolinate, Soy phosphatidylserine, Ginkgo biloba.

=== Function: LIGHT WEIGHT ===
- Functionality: Boosts metabolism, curbs cravings for sugar and other carbohydrates
- Flavors: Açai Pomegranate, Blueberry Raspberry, Peach Mango
- Key ingredients: EGCG, Resveratrol, and Gymnema.

=== Function: URBAN DETOX ===
- Functionality: Recovery from hangovers; clears particulate pollution from lungs and sinuses
- Flavors: Citrus Prickly Pear and Goji Berry
- Key ingredients: N-Acetyle-Cysteine, Prickly Pear Fruit Extract, B vitamins (riboflavin or vitamin B_{2}), vitamins B_{6} and B_{12}, folate.

=== Function: WATER ===
- Electrolyte-enhanced, vapor distilled water

== Advocates ==
Function has developed a strong following in the Hollywood community, with fans ranging from Madonna, Shakira, Tobey Maguire, Lauren Conrad, Keanu Reeves, Kelly Slater, celebrity trainer Tracy Anderson, and pro snowboarder Jake Blauvelt.
