= Spellbound (game show) =

- Genre: Game show
- Created by: Stephen Leahy
- Presented by: Paul Coia
- Starring: Debbie Greenwood
- Voices of: Charles Foster
- Country of origin: United Kingdom
- Original language: English
- No. of series: 4
- No. of episodes: 185

Production
- Running time: 30 minutes (inc. adverts)
- Production company: Action Time

Original release
- Network: Sky One
- Release: 3 October 1994 – 30 August 1996

Spellbound is a British game show that aired on Sky One from 3 October 1994 to 30 August 1996. It was hosted by Paul Coia.

== Background ==
Spellbound was created for Sky One as a way to involve readers of the network's Sky Magazine in an interactive game. The magazine included game cards, which viewers could use to mark off letters revealed in each round; all viewers who marked off every letter on their card for that day and called the studio by a set time won equal shares of a £1,000 cash jackpot. Viewers could also play a call-in game to qualify for a chance to answer a multiple-choice general knowledge question and win £1,000.

The studio portion of the show was pre-recorded, while the viewer-involvement sections were transmitted live as inserts.

=== Main game: Lucky Letters ===
The contestants were shown a board of 15 numbers, ranging from 1 to 99 and arranged in three rows of five. Hidden behind some of these numbers were letters that spelled out two words in a category announced by Coia. The other numbers concealed "lousy letters" that did not belong in either word. Every letter in a word was vertically or horizontally adjacent to the one after it, and the initial "starter letter" was marked by a gold star. No individual space was used in both words, or more than once in either word alone.

Each contestant chose a number from the board to start the round. If the letter behind it belonged in a word, the number was added to their score; if it was a lousy letter, they received no points for that turn. After all three contestants had had two turns (later reduced to one), Coia began to ask toss-up questions on the buzzer, and the contestant who responded correctly chose a number. Finding a starter letter immediately awarded a free turn, and completing a word awarded both a free turn and a 50-point bonus. However, if the contestant completed a word by finding its starter letter, they received only one free turn. The round ended when all the letters in both words had been uncovered.

Three rounds were played, with the lowest scorer at the end of each round choosing first in the next one. The high scorer after the third round advanced to the Spellbound Challenge.

=== Bonus round: Spellbound Challenge ===
The five vowels (A, E, I, O, U) were displayed three times each on the board, covered with playing card symbols (diamonds, hearts, clubs, spades, jokers) and scrambled. Based on Coia's talk with the contestant about their hobbies, three words were chosen and stripped of their first two vowels. The contestant had eight chances to complete the words by uncovering the six vowels on the board. When a usable vowel was found, the contestant chose where to put it in the three words.

At different times during the show's run, either cash or prizes would be at stake. When cash was offered, the contestant won £250 for completing each of the first two words, and the third replaced this money with a jackpot of at least £1,000 that was randomly set at the beginning of the episode. In the case of prizes, the first completed word awarded a prize and each successive word replaced it with one of greater value.

== Transmissions ==
Series	Start date	End date	Episodes
1	3 October 1994	25 November 1994	40
2	24 April 1995	30 June 1995	50
3	2 October 1995	1 December 1995	45
4	1 July 1996	30 August 1996	50

== Cancellation ==
The show was axed by Sky One in 1996 because date specific and pre-recorded output lacked flexibility of schedule changes.
