= Sale of the Century (British game show) =

British TV game show (1971–1998)

- Genre: Game show
- Created by: Reg Grundy
- Presented by: Nicholas Parsons; Steve Jones (1981 celebrity special); Peter Marshall; Keith Chegwin
- Announcer: Peter Marshall; John Benson; Mitch Johnson; Martin Buchanan; Robin Houston
- Country of origin: United Kingdom
- Original language: English
- No. of series: 11 (ITV); 1 (Sky Channel); 2 (Challenge TV)
- No. of episodes: 411 (ITV) ??? (Sky Channel) ??? (Challenge TV)

Production
- Running time: 30 minutes (inc. adverts)
- Production companies: Anglia (1971–1983); Reg Grundy Productions (1989–1991, 1998)

Original release
- Network: ITV
- Release: 9 October 1971 – 6 November 1983
- Network: Sky One
- Release: 6 March 1989 – 3 October 1991
- Network: Challenge TV
- Release: 3 February 1997 – 1998

Related
- Sale of the Century

Sale of the Century is a British game show based on a US game show of the same name. It was first shown on ITV from 9 October 1971 to 6 November 1983, hosted by Nicholas Parsons. Special Celebrity Sale of the Century editions aired occasionally, starting on 2 January 1981 with Steve Jones as host.

The first series was aired only in the Anglia region, but it rolled out to other regions by 8 January 1972 and achieved full national coverage by 10 May 1975, at which point it was one of the most popular shows on the network – spawning the often-mocked introductory phrase "And now, from Norwich, it's the quiz of the week". Since Norwich was considered a backwater compared to London, it was often used ironically.

It has been revived twice: first on Sky Channel from 6 February 1989 to 3 October 1991 hosted by Peter Marshall and then on Challenge TV from 3 February 1997 to 1998 hosted by Keith Chegwin.

== Rules (1971–83; 1997–98) ==
The ITV and Challenge versions followed the rules of the original American version. Three contestants start off with £15 (£10 during the first four series). Questions are worth different values starting with £1, increasing to £3 after the second instant bargain, and finally £5 after the fourth; in the late 1970s, the values started at £3 but increased to £5 after the fourth instant bargain. The question is asked and players can buzz in at any time. Correct answers add the money to their score and incorrect answers subtract the money from their score with only one player allowed to buzz in on each question. If a contestant runs out of money at any time, he or she is eliminated from further play, but may remain in his or her seat for the remainder of the show.

=== Instant Bargain and Instant Sale ===
At four points during gameplay (later five), all players would be offered the opportunity to purchase merchandise at a bargain price. The first player to buzz in after the prize was revealed won and kept it regardless of the final outcome of the game, and the price was deducted from their score. During early series, the prices were announced in pounds and pence, but were always rounded off to the nearest whole pound for scoring purposes if a purchase was made. (For example, if a prize was valued at £14.95, the player who purchased it would have £15 deducted from their score.) Later, the prize values were always announced in whole pounds. Any player who buzzed in before the prize had been revealed was disqualified from being able to purchase it, but they still lost the amount of its price; the other players remained eligible to make the purchase.

Also during the early ITV series, an "Open Sale" was offered just before the commercial break, in which a number of smaller gifts were offered for less than £5 each. Every player had the opportunity to buy any or all of the gifts, and a single player could buy more than one of any particular gift. By 1977, Open Sale had been replaced by an instant bargain.

The Challenge TV version kept the rules of the ITV version, except there was no "Open Sale", and players were spotted £15 to start. There were five rounds with questions being worth £1 in round one, £3 in rounds two and three, and £5 in rounds four and five. Finally, the game ended with 60 seconds of £5 questions. The player in the lead at the end of this round was declared the champion.

== Rules (1989–91) ==
The Sky Channel version had rules that were based on Australia's 1980–1988 format and America's 1983–1989 format, with better prizes than before.

In this format, each player started with £20, and each question was worth only £5.

There were only three "Instant Sales" (renamed Gift Shops), and only the player in the lead could buy.

The biggest change was the "Fame Game": Here, a succession of increasingly larger clues were given to the identity of a famous person, place, or event. In this round, players could buzz-in and answer at any time, with the player shut out for the remainder of the question if they gave an incorrect answer.

If one of the players buzzed-in and answered correctly, the contestant chose from a game board with nine squares. If all three contestants failed to come up with a right answer, then nobody got to pick. Once chosen, the space selected would be spun around to reveal either a relatively small prize (typically appliances or furniture valued at around a weekly wage) or a bonus money card, which added to the player's score.

There were £10, £15, and £25 bonuses added each round; in addition, in the third round was a "Wild Card", which offered the choice of £100 or a chance to pick again.

The game ended with the Speed Round where the host would ask as many questions as possible within 60 seconds. The player with the most money when time ran out won the game.

If there was a tie for the lead after the Speed Round, another question was asked of the tied players. Answering this question awarded £5 and the win; missing the question deducted £5 and lost the game.

== Shopping ==
The winning contestant would be given the opportunity to spend his or her cash total on at least one of four grand prizes at the "Sale of the Century" which almost always included a new car. Originally, new champions could return next week or make a purchase and retire, which returning champions must do upon winning again. From 1977 to 1983, any champion who won the game with £140 or more could choose to purchase one of the lesser four prizes or correctly answer a possible four of five questions, with no risk, to win a car.

On the 1989–1991 and 1997–1998 versions, there were a series of six prizes (five in 1997–1998) increasing in value. As on the Australian and American series, wins added money to the champion's bank, and he or she could elect to buy the highest value prize they could afford. As in the original series, the last prize on offer was a car, and it could be had for £585 (£500 in 1997–1998).

Any defeated contestant was able to keep whatever money and prizes they had earned along the way.

== Other background information ==
Nationally popularizing its catchphrase "And now, from Norwich, it's the quiz of the week", Sale of the Century was one of the most consistently high-rating entertainment shows of the 1970s, gaining peak viewing figures of 20 million. This original version of the show was restricted in the prize amount through then-national agreements, meaning that the featured cars had to be below set limits which increased from the original limit of £1,000 to £2,000 in 1977 and £3,500 in 1981. The producers hence preferred to engage with foreign manufacturers to provide better value prizes, often including top-of-the-range Ladas. Other prizes could average no more than £1,000 during the 1970s or £1,750 during the 1980s.

On 22 December 1978, an all-out strike at the BBC meant that 21.2 million viewers watched the programme, the highest ever rating for a game show produced by ITV.

By the time the original version ended, it had awarded 500 contestants over £500,000 in prizes.

Celebrity specials aired occasionally from 2 January 1981, with prizes won going to charities.

The show is often famed as having been the place that record producer Simon Cowell made his television debut. The video (of his appearance on the 1990 version) is available on YouTube and extracts of it were shown during the National Television Awards in Cowell's VT before receiving the Special Recognition Award from Andrew Lloyd Webber. Cowell appeared on 2 episodes (winning his first game) and won only £20 worth of cooking utensils.

The theme tune, "Joyful Pete", honored the original producer of the show, Peter Joy and was written by Peter Fenn, who also provided the live Hammond organ musical cues in each episode.

The theme music for the Sky One revival would later be used as the theme music for the German adaptation Hopp Oder Topp.

== Transmissions ==
=== ITV era ===
| Series | Start date | End date | Episodes | Presenter |
|---|---|---|---|---|
| 1 | 9 October 1971 | 30 March 1973 | 75 | Nicholas Parsons |
| 2 | 15 September 1973 | 26 July 1975 | 95 | Nicholas Parsons |
| 3 | 6 September 1975 | 25 June 1976 | 43 | Nicholas Parsons |
| 4 | 1 October 1976 | 8 July 1977 | 41 | Nicholas Parsons |
| 5 | 5 November 1977 | 15 July 1978 | 37 | Nicholas Parsons |
| 6 | 17 November 1978 | 9 March 1979 | 18 | Nicholas Parsons |
| 7 | 14 July 1979 | 18 August 1979 | 6 | Nicholas Parsons |
| 8 | 22 December 1979 | 30 August 1980 | 40 | Nicholas Parsons |
| 9 | 24 April 1981 | 18 September 1981 | 22 | Nicholas Parsons |
| 10 | 4 April 1982 | 5 September 1982 | 20 | Nicholas Parsons |
| 11 | 7 August 1983 | 6 November 1983 | 14 | Nicholas Parsons |

==== Regional transmissions information ====
===== 1971–1972 =====
- Anglia: 9 October 1971
- ATV, HTV, Westward, Southern: 8 January 1972
- Border: 12 February 1972
- LWT, Channel: 19 February 1972
- Ulster: 14 July 1972

===== 1974–1975 =====
- Yorkshire, Tyne Tees: 13 September 1974
- Granada: 27 September 1974
- Scottish: 27 October 1974
- Grampian: 10 May 1975

=== Sky Channel era ===
| Series | Start date | End date | Episodes | Presenter |
|---|---|---|---|---|
| 1 | 6 February 1989 | 3 October 1991 | ??? | Peter Marshall |

=== Challenge TV era ===
| Series | Start date | End date | Episodes | Presenter |
|---|---|---|---|---|
| 1 | 3 February 1997 | 29 August 1997 | ??? | Keith Chegwin |
| 2 | 1998 | 1998 | ??? | Keith Chegwin |
