= Shock Treatment (TV series) =

British reality television series

- Starring: Rutger Hauer

Original release
- Network: Sky One; Fox Reality Channel
- Release: 2005

Shock Treatment is a reality entertainment documentary shown in 2005 on Sky One in the United Kingdom and Fox Reality in the United States. It stars Rutger Hauer as presenter and John Woolvett as the fictional Dr. John Templeton. Other members of the cast include actress Sharon Lloyd as a fake volunteer and magician Paul Andrews as Head of Experiments.

In this show, four volunteers are challenged to stay for 48 hours in a disused mental asylum and endure a series of mental challenges designed to test their courage. Such challenges include facing violence, snakes, electricity, the dark, drowning, disgust, heights, spiders, pain, and inflicting pain on others. A cast of actors and stuntmen are used to increase the realism of the challenges, while psychological tricks and illusions aim to convince the volunteers that they are really facing their worst fears. They can forfeit a challenge at any time by pressing a buzzer which they hold with them.

When not performing a challenge, the volunteers are escorted to their cells by unknown masked men who never talk, to create an environment of stress and panic. The volunteers also have to stay the night in their cells in complete darkness, while screams and shouts further unsettle the volunteers.

The volunteers are also allowed to leave the asylum at any time should they be unable to continue, but those that stay to the end are rewarded with the knowledge that they have faced their greatest fears.
