= Brainiac: Science Abuse =

British entertainment documentary television series

- Genre: Entertainment
- Directed by: Peter Eyre
- Presented by: Richard Hammond; Vic Reeves
- Starring: Jon Tickle; Charlotte Hudson; Thaila Zucchi
- Country of origin: United Kingdom
- Original language: English
- No. of series: 6
- No. of episodes: 58 (inc. 7 specials)

Production
- Executive producer: Stewart Morris
- Producer: Richard Greenwood
- Running time: 60 minutes (inc. adverts)
- Production company: Granada Productions

Original release
- Network: Sky One
- Release: 13 November 2003 – 30 March 2008

Related
- Brainiac: History Abuse; Brainiac's Test Tube Baby

Brainiac: Science Abuse (often shortened to simply Brainiac) is a British entertainment documentary show that aired on Sky One from 13 November 2003 to 30 March 2008. It was created by Executive Producer Stewart Morris and Andy Milligan. During each episode of the show, numerous experiments are carried out to verify whether common conceptions are true (such as whether it is possible to run across a pool of custard) or simply to create impressive explosions. The experimenters on the show are referred to as "Brainiacs", and each episode usually finishes with the destruction of a caravan.

The original presenters were Richard Hammond and Jon Tickle, who were joined in the second series by Charlotte Hudson. Hammond, alongside the original production team, left after the fourth season and was replaced by Vic Reeves, and Hudson left after the fifth and was replaced by Thaila Zucchi. On 28 July 2008 Sky cancelled the show saying it had been taken as far as it could go.

== History ==
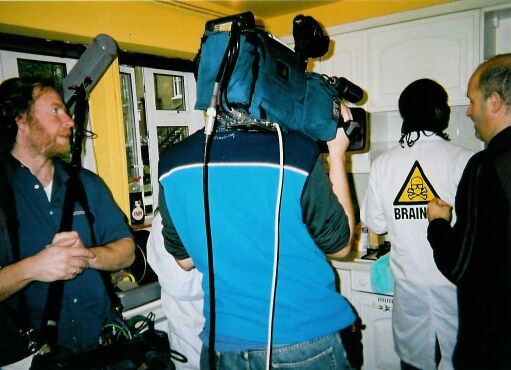
Brainiac recording on location

=== Series 1 (2003) ===
Series 1 featured a wide variety of experiments including testing to see whether a mobile phone would ignite petrol vapours, walking on custard and testing the effects of electric shocks on various Brainiacs.

=== Series 2 (2004) ===
Series 2 saw the start of "Brainiac Snooker", in which World Snooker professional Quinten Hann would pot the last six balls on a table into pockets connected to fuses which would cause a caravan rigged with a different explosive to explode. This series also included several shorter segments, such as "Pub Science with Dr. Bunhead" in which the recurring character of Dr. Bunhead goes into a local pub and performs a small scale science experiment. Dr. Bunhead also had a second segment in which he did the same as with "Pub Science", but instead around a home. Another segment was added in this show called "Tina Turner and Her Bunsen Burner" in which "Tina Turner" goes to blow up a car using various explosives while lighting specifics with a golden Bunsen burner. This series also gives birth to "I can do science, me", "Things Tickles' body can't do" and "Explosive of the day" in which a group of women (referred to as the Brainiac Babes) ignite a random explosive, each of which is given a score out of ten. The audience could also play along, making this one of the first truly interactive segments of the show. At the end of the final episode, the Brainiac Babes were joined by a random viewer.

The second series also introduced Charlotte Hudson as a third, but minor, host, and saw the introduction of what then became long term character "Professor Myang-Li", played by Rachel Grant. Professor Myang-Li hosted a short segment in this series simply called "Sink or Float" in which she drops a piece of fruit into a pool and sees if it sinks or floats (similar to a future segment in Series 6 called "flush or float" where a piece of fruit is dropped into a toilet and the toilet is flushed to see if the fruit flushes down or not).

=== Series 3 (2005) ===
Series 3 featured Brainiac Golf (similar to Brainiac Snooker, but exploding caravans filled with different substances that exploded with coloured flames depending on the chemicals used), Lad v. Lass, Thermite, "Does being electrocuted affect your ability at work?" (human statue, flair bartending, darts player), "Things the instruction manuals don't warn you about", 47 Second Science, Diana Ross and her Chain Reaction, and testing which things break and which things bounce after a ten-foot drop.

Dr. John P. Kilcoyne, Associate Dean of the University of Sunderland had a regular slot where he mixed various chemicals to see whether they "fizz" or "bang".

=== Series 4 (2006) ===
Series 4 introduced Brainiac Darts, during which Bobby George threw a perfect set, always finishing on the Double Top which triggered the explosion of a caravan, and a new "I Can Do Science Me" which is set around auditions. There is also a feature called "Things What My Body Does", in which a member of the public is filmed doing something extraordinary with their bodies. It also featured "Movie Stars Destroying Cars" and Dr. John P. Kilcoyne with "Glow or Blow".

It also introduced a new feature called "Brainiac for a Day", where contestants could bring an item of their choice to blow up. It was set out as a game show with the hosts Dolly Girl (Lisa Marie Bourke) (previously "Jane" in the "Lad v. Lass" segment) and Dolly Boy (Stefan D'Bart).

=== Series 5 (2007) ===
Series 5 retained "Brainiac for a Day", "Things What My Body Does", and contains new segments like "Brainiac V Beast", Dr Kilcoyne with "Fizzle or Flash" and Prof. Myang Li (Rachel Grant) with steel balls, attempting to "shatter or shunt" various objects. In addition, Vic Reeves appeared as the Russian scientist Uri Abusikov, along with his assistant Ursula, attempting to destroy things with liquid nitrogen.

In this series, Reeves took over as host from Richard Hammond, who had left the show. Hammond's growing commitments to Top Gear and his contract with the BBC meant that he was finding it increasingly difficult to fulfil his role as presenter of Brainiac. Hammond was also reportedly losing interest in doing Brainiac. Reeves was brought in as replacement host shortly after the end of the fourth series and before Richard Hammond's near fatal crash. The original production team including Executive Producer Stewart Morris, Series Producer Richard Greenwood and Series Director Peter Eyre left the programme at the same time as Hammond.

=== Series 6 (2008) ===
Series 6 saw the return of Vic Reeves as host and Jon Tickle as co-host. Thaila Zucchi replaced Hudson as the third co-host and made her debut on the series in two items: "How Hard is Your Thing?" in which she tests the hardness of different objects using thermite and a ton of bricks dropped from a crane, and "Shocking Acts" in which she finds out whether variety acts can still perform while receiving electric shocks. Other new segments included "Gas Bang Wallop" featuring a character called Barry Bernard who destroys things with gas, "Chemistry Deathmatch" in which regular characters Dr Bunhead and Professor John Kilcoyne go head-to-head to produce the best experiments, "Custard Dreams" which follows the adventures of a Brainiac who discovers he can walk on custard, and "Stars in Their Caravans" which sees a variety of UK celebrities trapped in caravans, in a mock game show which results in large explosions.

Competitors

- Gail Porter
- Frank Bruno
- Paul Daniels
- Debbie McGee
- Jayne Middlemiss
- Wozza Thompson (Antony Worrall Thompson)
- Tony Blackburn
- WAGs
- Danielle Lloyd
- Abi Titmuss
- Keeley Hazell

== Forged results ==
At least one faked result has surfaced: the alkali metal experiments. The experiment aimed to illustrate periodic trends in the alkali metal series. It showed the violent reactions of metallic sodium and potassium with water, in which the hydrogen produced subsequent explosions, and intended to demonstrate the even greater reactivity of rubidium and caesium by dropping them into a water-filled bathtub. The reaction was not particularly spectacular, and the crew substituted explosives for the alkali metals. A wire connected to an offscreen detonator can be observed on the side of the bathtub filled with water for a brief moment during the caesium experiment.

The Brainiac staff have admitted that the explosions had been faked. According to Tom Pringle, Brainiac's "Dr Bunhead", very little occurred in the real reaction of caesium and water, as the large volume of water over it drowned out the thermal shock wave that should have shattered the bathtub. The crew decided to set up a bomb in the tub and used the footage of that explosion.

Similar experiments with caesium or rubidium have been repeated; these include Popular Science columnist Theodore Gray's experiments, the "Viewer Special Threequel" episode of MythBusters, and an attempt made as part of the Periodic Table of Videos series created by Brady Haran and the University of Nottingham. In no case were the rubidium and caesium reactions nearly as violent or explosive as depicted on Brainiac.

An earlier and more successful attempt was shown on television as part of a documentary produced by the Open University. In footage recorded for the documentary, a sequence of experiments is carried out to demonstrate the increasing reactivity of alkali metals, placing them in a glass basin filled with water. A sample of rubidium produces a small explosion as soon as it hits the water's surface (with some pieces of the sample floating on the surface of the water and creating additional explosions). The experiment is repeated with a sample of caesium, which explodes violently and destroys the basin by shattering the glass. This video is available online at The Open University.

== Music ==
Brainiac: Science Abuse plays music in every episode, including hits by Britney Spears, C & C Music Factory, and Elton John. Some are themes of various recurring segments such as "There's No One Quite Like Grandma" sung by the St Winifred's School Choir for the Granny Brainiac segments in Series 3. The "I Like Hard Things" segment normally features heavy rock music such as Linkin Park or Limp Bizkit. The segment "I Can Do Science, Me" uses the track "Scientist" by The Dandy Warhols. Various segments over the course of the show featured music by Andrew W.K.

One of the show's recurring skits featured heavy metal band Twisted Sister's song "You Can't Stop Rock 'n' Roll" in which a stereo playing the song is destroyed in various ways to humorously demonstrate that you can in fact "stop rock 'n' roll" using the shown methods.

The title music and many of the incidental tracks used in the show were composed by Grant Buckerfield. Most of the music was changed to generic production music for the DVD release.

== Hosting timeline ==
| Series | Host | | |
| Series | 1 | 2 | 3 |
|---|---|---|---|
| 1 | Richard Hammond | Jon Tickle | —N/a |
| 2 | Richard Hammond | Jon Tickle | Charlotte Hudson |
| 3 | Richard Hammond | Jon Tickle | Charlotte Hudson |
| 4 | Richard Hammond | Jon Tickle | Charlotte Hudson |
| 5 | Vic Reeves | Jon Tickle | Charlotte Hudson |
| 6 | Vic Reeves | Jon Tickle | Thaila Zucchi |

== Transmissions ==
=== Series ===
| Series | Start date | End date | Episodes |
|---|---|---|---|
| 1 | 13 November 2003 | 18 December 2003 | 6 |
| 2 | 2 September 2004 | 25 November 2004 | 13 |
| 3 | 25 August 2005 | 13 October 2005 | 8 |
| 4 | 16 July 2006 | 10 September 2006 | 9 |
| 5 | 8 May 2007 | 24 July 2007 | 12 |
| 6 | 13 January 2008 | 22 March 2008 | 10 |

=== Specials ===
| Date | Entitle |
|---|---|
| 24 December 2003 | The Best of Series 1 |
| 21 December 2004 | The Best of Series 2 |
| 3 November 2005 | The Best of Series 3 |
| 20 December 2005 | Brainiac Christmas Cracker |
| 24 September 2006 | The Best of Series 4 |
| 1 January 2008 | The Best of Series 5 |
| 30 March 2008 | The Best of Series 6 |

== See also ==
- MythBusters - another show with a focus on scientific experiments
- Richard Hammond's Blast Lab - a later Science-themed show hosted by Richard Hammond
