= Brainiac: History Abuse =

British entertainment documentary show

- Genre: Entertainment
- Presented by: Charlotte Hudson
- Starring: Stephen Wisdom; Regina Cotter
- Country of origin: United Kingdom
- Original language: English
- No. of series: 1
- No. of episodes: 8

Production
- Running time: 60 minutes (inc. adverts)
- Production company: Granada Productions

Original release
- Network: Sky1
- Release: 1 June – 20 July 2005

Related
- Brainiac: Science Abuse; Brainiac's Test Tube Baby

Brainiac: History Abuse is a British entertainment documentary show that aired on Sky1 from 1 June to 20 July 2005. It is a spin-off of the show Brainiac: Science Abuse concentrating on historical subjects. The show is presented by Charlotte Hudson with additional input from Stephen Wisdom as "Ernest Clough, History Buff", and Regina Cotter as Shell in the Kitchen cooking traditional medieval delicacies.

The series wasn't as popular as its scientific counterpart, and was axed after one series. However, it is repeated on Sky3.

Regular features include:

- "Men in Steel" and "Knight Fever" – highlighting modern-day activities you can do (with varying degrees of difficulty) while wearing a suit of armour.
- Shell's Kitchen – medieval (and to most modern tastes, unpalatable) recipes, presented in a parody of the style of Nigella Lawson.
- Ancient Hist-O-Wee – historical uses for urine
- Historical medicinal remedies
- Ancient Vege-Battles: historical battles illustrated using fruit and vegetables
- The Brainiac Battering Ram Squad "fixing" an everyday problem with unnecessary force, such as opening a vending machine or a locked car
- Like Brainiac: Science Abuse before it, the show always ends with an item in which a caravan gets blown up. In deference to the theme, they use a "historical" explosive for an everyday task (e.g. a WW2 depth charge to unblock a toilet).
- Torture instruments were shown and demonstrated with fruit

== Releases ==
Australian Release

Season	Date Released	# Of Episodes	# Of Discs	Special Features
Complete Series	8 September 2010	8	2	None

== Soundtrack ==
Certain pieces of music are used repeatedly during the series, including:

- "Toxic" and "...Baby One More Time" by Britney Spears
- "Doctor Doctor" by the Thompson Twins
- "Stayin' Alive" by the Bee Gees
- "Everybody Hurts" by R.E.M.
- "Unbelievable" by EMF
- "Babies" by Pulp
- Theme from Get Carter by Roy Budd
- "Hysteria" by Muse
