= Brainiac's Test Tube Baby =

- Starring: Dominic Wood; Jon Tickle
- Country of origin: United Kingdom
- Original language: English
- No. of series: 1
- No. of episodes: 16

Production
- Running time: 60 minutes
- Production company: Original Productions UK Entertainment

Original release
- Network: Sky One
- Release: 3 August 2006 – 8 January 2007

Related
- Brainiac: History Abuse; Brainiac: Science Abuse

Brainiac's Test Tube Baby was a live British parody popular science entertainment TV show hosted by Dominic Wood. It was a spin-off of the highly successful Sky1 show Brainiac: Science Abuse and first aired on Thursday 3 August 2006. Wood is assisted by former Big Brother contestant Jon Tickle who also co-hosts the original Brainiac programme.

Aspects of the show included "The Test Tube Babes" (two Brainiacs who search out "scientific truth"), the "CO_{2} challenge", where teams competed to propel a wheelchair as fast as they can on fire extinguisher power alone, the blowing up of caravans and microwaves (as in its parent show) and competitions with questions about the Brainiac series.

It also had a forum for viewers to contact the show with their science questions, e.g. "will a plant grow as well in saliva as it will in water?" Jon Tickle plays the "resident boffin" to answer these questions.

The seventh episode which was scheduled to air on 21 September was cancelled in light of Brainiac: Science Abuse presenter Richard Hammond's car crash, despite being recorded live. The episode was later aired on 8 January 2007 as the final episode. Brainiac's Test Tube Baby was produced by Original Productions UK Entertainment, at the time, an affiliate of Original Productions of Burbank, California.

The first series ended on 12 October 2006. It was stated on the final show that a second series had been commissioned but it never happened.

== Specials ==
A Bonfire Night special was shown on 6 November 2006 and a Christmas special was shown on 23 December 2006. These became the last 2 episodes.
