= Sky One =

British entertainment television channel

- Logo used since 2026

- Alternate Logo for UI/EPG, digital and small format spaces
- Country: United Kingdom
- Broadcast area: United Kingdom; Republic of Ireland; Channel Islands; Isle of Man

Programming
- Picture format: HDTV 1080i (downscaled to 16:9 576i for the SD feed)

Ownership
- Owner: Sky Group
- Sister channels: List of Sky UK channels

History
- Launched: 26 April 1982; 44 years ago (original); 24 February 2026; 6 months ago (relaunch)
- Replaced: Galaxy (on the BSB service) (original); Sky Showcase / Sky Max (relaunch)
- Closed: 1 September 2021; 5 years ago (original)
- Replaced by: Sky Showcase / Sky Max (original)
- Former names: Satellite Television (1982–1984); Sky Channel (1984–1989); Sky 1 (1996–1997, 2011–2017); Sky1 (2008–2011)

Availability

Terrestrial
- Sky: 106
- Virgin: 109

Streaming media
- Sky Go: Watch live
- Now: Watch live
- Virgin TV Anywhere (UK): Watch live (UK only)
- Virgin TV Anywhere (Ireland): Watch live (Ireland only)

Sky One is a British pay television channel operated and owned by Sky Group, a subsidiary of Comcast. Originally launched on 26 April 1982 as Satellite Television, it was Europe's first satellite and non-terrestrial channel. From 31 July 1989, it became Sky One and broadcast exclusively in the United Kingdom and Ireland as British Sky Broadcasting's flagship channel.

The channel initially shutdown on 1 September 2021 as part of a restructuring with its EPG position taken by Sky Showcase and much of its content library moved to Sky Max. The channel relaunched on 24 February 2026 following the shutdown of Sky Showcase and Sky Max, with the programming from both channels moved to Sky One.

Sky One broadcast original programming—such as An Idiot Abroad, Battlestar Galactica, and The Russell Howard Hour,—and programming imported from the United States, including 24, Bones, House, Lost, Prison Break, The Simpsons, and The X-Files, along with the Stargate, Star Trek, and Arrowverse franchises.

== History ==
=== Satellite Television (1982–1984) ===
Sky One started on 26 April 1982 as Satellite Television Limited, and was Europe's first ever cable and satellite channel, originally broadcasting from the Orbital Test Satellite aimed at cable operators all over the continent. At first, the station struggled financially due to disappointing ratings in the countries in which it was officially available, which in turn led to insufficient advertising revenue and increasing difficulty in covering the high transmission costs. Initially, the channel's own programming and continuity was played out from the Molinare studios at Fouberts Place in the West End of London.

On 27 June 1983, the shareholders of Satellite Television agreed a £5 million offer to give News International 65% of the company. With the successful launch of the Intelsat V satellite in October 1983 Rupert Murdoch was able to extend the broadcast hours and the number of countries able to receive the signal.

=== Sky Channel (1984–1989) ===
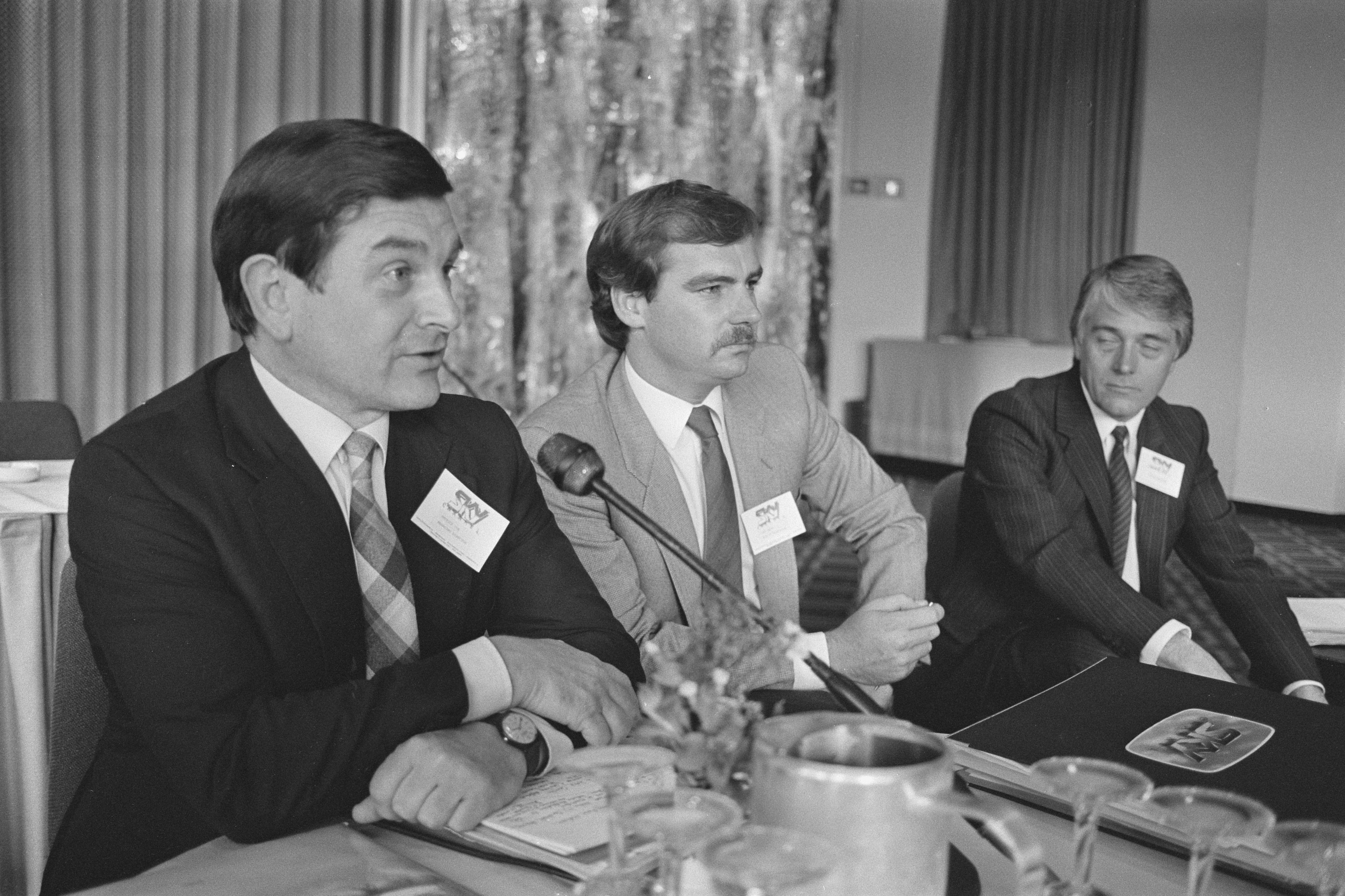
Sky Channel management 1984: Patrick Cox, Gary Davey and Malcolm Tallantire

On 16 January 1984, Satellite Television Limited was renamed Sky Channel and finally became available in the UK to Swindon Cable's 10,000 subscribers. It began incorporating a large number of American imports in its schedules and also increased the quantity of home-grown productions, including a number of new music shows with Gary Davies, Tony Blackburn, Linda de Mol, Pat Sharp, David "Kid" Jensen, and Anthea Turner presenting programmes such as Euro Top 40, and UK Top 50 Chart. New children's programmes like Fun Factory and The DJ Kat Show, many of which came not only from Sky's own studios in London (Sky having already abandoned the Molinare facilities by then), but also included programmes produced in the Netherlands by John de Mol's production company.

On 8 June 1988, Murdoch announced his plans to expand Sky's four channels, thus creating the Sky Television Network. On 5 February 1989, the service (Sky Channel, Sky News, Sky Movies and Eurosport) was launched as prime-time broadcasts to European cable operators ended and were replaced by Eurosport, a joint venture between Sky and the European Broadcasting Union aimed at a pan-European audience (like Sky Channel had been up to that point for a time afterwards, some of Sky's previous pan-European programming continued to be broadcast before Eurosport's start-up, under the branding of Sky Europe).

A new raft of shows were created for the channel, including the daily talent show Sky Star Search; game shows (Sale of the Century, based on the 1980s American version, and The Price Is Right); weekly documentary series Frank Bough's World; daily late night talk show Jameson Tonight; agony aunt advice show A Problem Shared; and Sky by Day, Sky TV's variation on ITV's more popular This Morning, hosted by former BBC Radio 1 DJ Tony Blackburn (who by then had moved to commercial radio) and former Magpie presenter Jenny Hanley, as the show aired a mix of entertainment, gossip and fashion.

The "New Sky Channel", as it was dubbed in on-air promotion prior to its 5 February 1989 launch, continued to broadcast its signature children's programmes (The DJ Kat Show and Fun Factory), and also expanded its daytime programming with six back-to-back soaps (The Sullivans, Another World, General Hospital, As the World Turns, Loving and The Young Doctors) while reducing music programming to only one or two hours per day. Classic sitcoms (The Lucy Show and Family Affair) and more recent comedies (Three's Company and Family Ties) as well as put on the schedule along with dramas (The Streets of San Francisco, Trapper John, M.D., Emergency!, The Love Boat, Fantasy Island, Voyagers! and Eight Is Enough) were included. Sky Channel also aired classic movies, made-for-TV movies and miniseries (beginning with Spearfield's Daughter on its first night). Dolly Parton's recent variety show Dolly, popular Australian science and technology show Beyond 2000, the Nescafé UK Top 50 chart show, Sunday morning religious programme Hour of Power, hour-long weekend edition of celebrity news magazine Entertainment Tonight and telecasts of World Wrestling Federation rounded out Sky Channel's weekend schedule. Special event programming included late night live telecasts of boxing matches and various music concerts (such as Bon Jovi and Bros in August 1989).

=== Sky One (1989–2021) ===
On 31 July 1989, the channel was renamed Sky One and closed in most European countries, broadcasting only to the British Isles. During September of that year, Sky One began to air more recent programming, an early success being Moonlighting (which the BBC had previously screened but not repeated), ALF and Wiseguy, also aired the British television premiere of a new drama series 21 Jump Street. Back-to-back soaps (Rich Man, Poor Man and Falcon Crest) as well as action shows (Riptide and Hunter) were also added to its prime time schedule. A number of Australian dramas (Against the Wind, Boney, A Town Like Alice and Barrier Reef), as well as the soap operas (Return to Eden, Chances, E Street and Paradise Beach) were aired. Some Australian children's programmes, such as Skippy the Bush Kangaroo and Zoo Family also aired on Sky One. In 1990 and early 1991 (prior to the launch of Sky Sports), Sky One broadcast numerous live cricket telecasts during which it pre-empted its regularly scheduled programming.

Following the merger with British Satellite Broadcasting's Galaxy on 2 November 1990, Sky One also picked up new sitcoms (Parker Lewis Can't Lose, Growing Pains, Murphy Brown, In Living Color, Wings and Designing Women), dramas (China Beach, Hill Street Blues and the soap operas, The Young and the Restless and The Bold and the Beautiful), reruns of classic sitcoms (Bewitched and The Addams Family), a new animated series Teenage Mutant Hero Turtles was added to children's programmes, and daily dating game show Love at First Sight was presented by Helen Brumby and Bruno Brookes. Following the daily repeats of Star Trek and Lost in Space, Sky One picked up a number of science-fiction shows which became a crucial part of its evening line-up such as the UK premiere of Alien Nation, also added reruns of V (1983 miniseries, The Final Battle and the television series) and Battlestar Galactica in 1991. After the 1992 airing of The Flash, Sky One also picked up Star Trek: The Next Generation which had previously aired on BBC2 began a long twice per day run of the franchise in a late afternoon and a late evening timeslot on Mondays to Fridays.

A staple of Sky One prime time schedule in its early years were glossy American miniseries such as Roots, Shōgun, Masada, The Thorn Birds, North and South and Lonesome Dove, which aired mostly in two-hour installments each week Sundays to Tuesdays. As the format was beginning to fade in the United States, the miniseries were reduced to two nights in late 1992 and then rescheduled to Tuesdays and Wednesdays in early 1994 under its new title called Midweek Drama, before being dropped altogether shortly after that and reappearing only as special event programming. In 1993, Sky One finally replaced its long-running Sunday night drama 21 Jump Street with exclusive premiere of The Young Indiana Jones Chronicles and later Star Trek: Deep Space Nine. The Sunday night timeslot was ultimately given to new episodes of the hit teen soap Beverly Hills, 90210 which was later paired off with its spin-off Melrose Place. After many years in the clear on 1 September of that year, Sky One was encrypted as part of the new Sky Multichannels subscription package, and could no longer be viewed outside Britain and Ireland without exporting a box, or receiving it over cable (although it had already been encrypted for a while since its original launch and first went in the clear in around 1987).

The start of 1995 saw Sky One begin 24-hour broadcasting and initially the overnight hours were filled by music videos. However by the end of the decade, overnight programming consisted of the same range of programmes broadcast at all other times of the day.

On 1 October 1998, Sky One's digital feed launched with Sky Digital. Sky One was one of the four last remaining channels on the analogue platform when it was switched off at midnight on 27 September 2001. In 2000, a dedicated feed of Sky One for Ireland was launched for most of this Irish feed's existence, the only difference between it and the United Kingdom feed has been differing commercials and programme promotions. In June 2003, the channel started broadcasting in 16:9 widescreen. However, all television commercials were broadcast in 4:3 until 21 November 2005, because they were played off the same servers for all Sky channels, many of which were not broadcast in widescreen.

On 25 August 2012, Stuart Murphy, director of Sky entertainment channels, announced that a one-hour timeshift of Sky One and Sky Atlantic will due to start in the autumn, with the former launching on 12 November of that year. For New Year's Day 2014 (1 January), Sky One was temporarily renamed Sky Onesie aiming "to encourage viewers to snuggle up in front of the television wearing onesies, in a bid to recover from the previous night's celebrations". In 2017, Sky One began broadcasting some sports coverage. This included a partial simulcast of Soccer Saturday, highlights of, and occasional live coverage of, Formula One motor racing and the occasional live football match. The summer of 2019 saw Sky One show highlights of the 2019 Cricket World Cup and live coverage of England's matches in the 2019 Netball World Cup.

==== 2004 programme relaunch ====
Sky One's programme lineup was relaunched at the start of 2004, with Sky television head Dawn Airey stating the channel had become too associated with The Simpsons, science fiction shows such as Star Trek: Enterprise, Andromeda and Stargate SG-1 (the latter of which continues to be shown extensively on Sky Max, Sky Mix and Sky Sci-Fi to this day) and raunchy factual entertainment shows such as the LWT-produced Ibiza Uncovered.

The channel was also struggling to acquire new American series, as FTA broadcasters had become familiar with Sky's tricks to buy the majority of American programming, with Channel 4 picking up the likes of The Sopranos and Without a Trace on an exclusive basis (although both programmes have since aired on Sky Atlantic) and Five picking up the likes of The Shield and the CSI franchise, which was at the peak of its popularity during this period.

Other competitors in the pay TV field also latched on to this, with LivingTV nabbing the likes of Will & Grace, Ally McBeal, Joan of Arcadia, Charmed, and later the likes of Boston Legal and Grey's Anatomy, and Hallmark Channel, which acquired Law & Order: Special Victims Unit (whilst Sky One held the rights to the original Law & Order).

Newly appointed controller of Sky One, Sara Ramsden, struck a deal with Warner Bros. International Television Distribution to acquire five new US dramas: mainly the medical drama Nip/Tuck (which Sky acquired the first-run pay TV rights to after Channel 4 had already bought the FTA rights) and the CBS police procedural drama Cold Case. The channel also poached the popular espionage drama 24 after finding success on BBC Two for its first two seasons. Other new shows acquired by Sky One for 2004 included Las Vegas and as part of the WB deal, Tarzan and Jane, the unproduced Fearless and Skin.

==== High-definition ====
To coincide with the launch of Sky HD, Sky One HD began broadcasting on 22 May 2006. The channel is a simulcast of Sky One and screens high-definition versions of some of the channel's programming, which include Lost, Bones, 24, WWE SmackDown, Fringe, Prison Break, House, and most recently new episodes of The Simpsons. Programmes that are not available in HD are "upscaled" (although Sky One showed its widescreen version of the television show Malcolm in the Middle, unlike most American broadcasts, since the film was originally filmed on Panavision widescreen film but cropped to full-screen by most broadcasters. This airing of the show preserves the film's appearance without stretching or upscaling, although some scenes were compromised for widescreen and had to be upscaled).

Sky stated that they intended to increase the amount of HD content they show, and hoped that by the end of 2008, two-thirds of all prime time shows, and 90% of their own original commissions, would be in HD. A new logo was introduced along with the rebrand on 31 August 2008.

On 1 October 2010, Sky1 HD launched on Virgin Media channel 122, with Sky2 moving to channel 123 and Sky3 moving to channel 180 on 22 September 2010, to make way for the new service.

==== Virgin Media dispute ====
On 1 March 2007 at midnight, Sky's basic channels – which included Sky One, Sky Two, Sky Three, Sky News, Sky Sports News, Sky Travel and Sky Travel Extra – were removed from the Virgin Media cable television services after a dispute from BSkyB. This was due to the expiry of their previous carriage agreement and the companies' inability to reach a new deal. Virgin issued legal proceedings against Sky over the dispute in April 2007.

At the beginning of March 2008, the two companies were reported to have resumed discussions over the dispute. Virgin chief executive Neil Berkett was reported as saying they had "continued interest in securing Sky basics back on our platform". The resumed talks had followed shortly after both Virgin and BSkyB had launched appeals against a recent Competition Appeal Tribunal ruling on BSkyB's 17.9% stake in ITV plc.

On 4 November 2008, a carriage deal between BSkyB and Virgin Media was reached and BSkyB's channels were available on Virgin's cable service from 13 November of that year. The Sky basic channels were spread across each tier of Virgin's cable television service: Sky Three and Sky News were made available in the lowest M tier; Sky Sports News joined the M+ tier; Sky One and Sky Two were made available in the L tier; and Sky Arts 1, Sky Arts 2, Sky Real Lives and Sky Real Lives 2 joined the XL tier.

Despite the dispute, Virgin Media's production arm launched its flagship channel Virgin1 to rival Sky One in 2007 on Sky's TV platform as well.

==== Closure ====
It was announced on 27 July 2021 that Sky One would be retired and that a new channel, Sky Showcase would replace its EPG slot on Sky. Another channel, Sky Max would launch on the same day. Most of Sky's original content and the drama output would move there, while most of the comedy output would move to Sky Comedy. Prodigal Son was the channel's last programme.

At the time of closure, it was available via digital satellite on Sky, digital cable on Virgin Media, IPTV on TalkTalk TV and online via Sky Go and Now. In Ireland, the channel was available via Sky Ireland, Virgin Media Ireland, and Eir Vision.

=== Sky One (2026–present) ===
==== Relaunch ====
It was announced on 3 February 2026 that Sky One was to relaunch on 24 February 2026, replacing Sky Showcase and Sky Max, with the programming from both channels moving to Sky One.

== Former logos ==
(1982–1984)

(1984–1989)

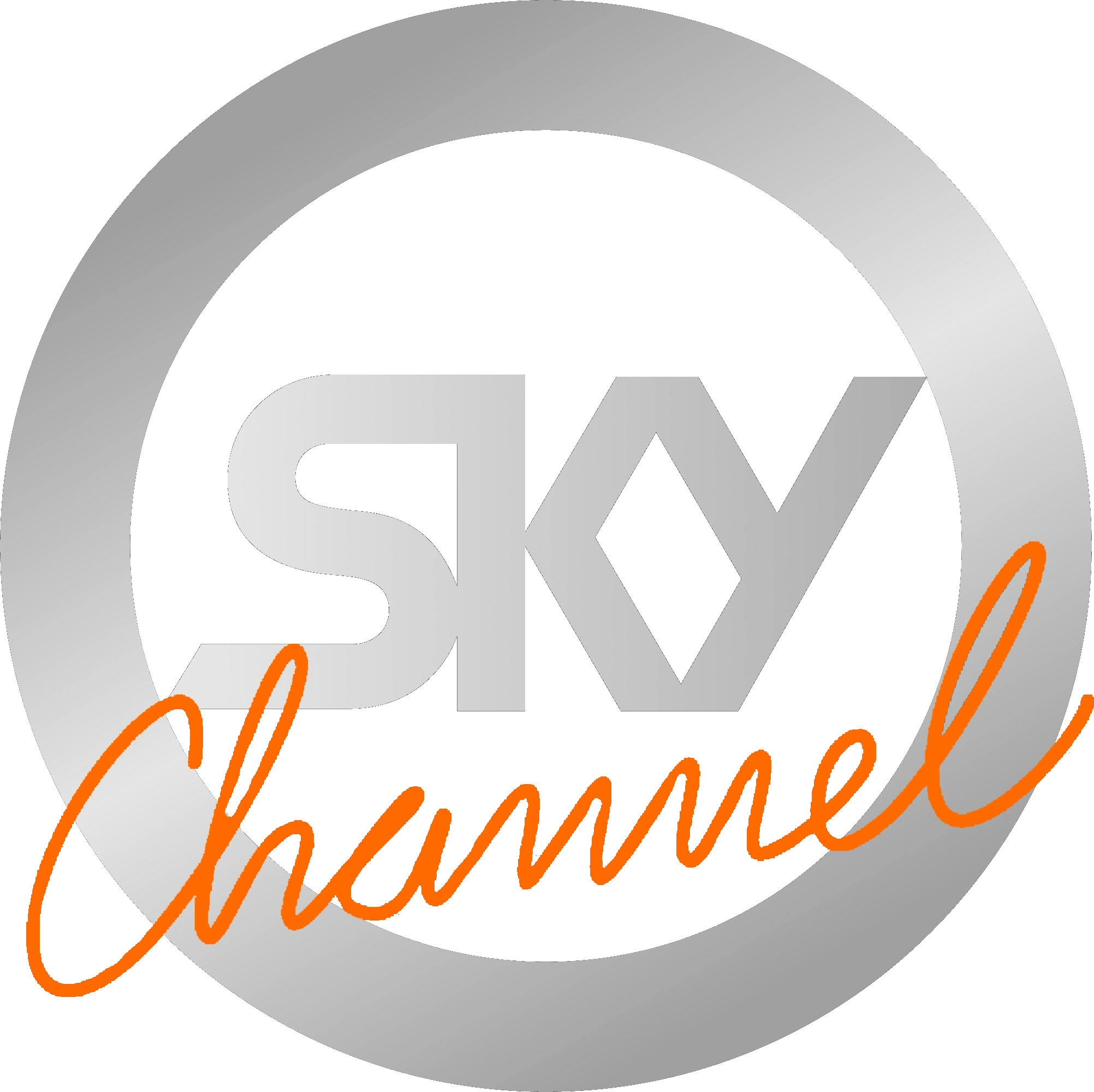
(5 February - 31 July 1989)

(1990–1993)

(1993–1995)

(1 October 1995 – 31 August 1996)

(1996–1997)

(1997–1998)

(1998–2002)

(2002–2004)

(2004–2008)

(2008–2011)

(2011–2015)

(2015–2017)

(2017–2020)

(2020–2021)

== Programming ==
=== 1980s and 1990s ===
Sky commissioned many homegrown programmes since it first started broadcasting back in 1984, but it was not until 1989 when content went beyond music and children's shows.

During the early years in commissioned some new game shows including:

- Sale of the Century (6 February 1989)
- The Price Is Right (4 September 1989)
- Love at First Sight (3 September 1990)
- Wife of the Week (11 December 1990)
- Anything for Money (6 February 1991)
- Games World (1 March 1993)
- Blockbusters (18 April 1994)
- Spellbound (3 October 1994)
- Jeopardy! (4 December 1995)
- Through the Keyhole (22 February 1996)
- Beat the Crusher (21 September 1998)
- Prickly Heat (11 October 1998)
- Dating Hell (13 March 1999)

The channel commissioned a number of home grown programmes (for example, dramas such as The Wanderer, Springhill, Dream Team and Space Island One) while expanding its small number of Australian television series, notably include:

- Chances (4 March 1992)
- E Street (5 April 1992)
- Paradise Beach (6 September 1993)

=== 2000s and 2010s ===
Sky One focused in science-fiction and other series in the 2000s which did not have a lot of successes, including:

- The Strangerers, a science-fiction sitcom show about two aliens on Earth, that was dropped after one series and never repeated
- Al Murray's sitcom Time Gentlemen Please
- Baddiel's Syndrome, a sitcom starring David Baddiel
- Hex, another science-fiction show which was cancelled in April 2006
- Mile High, which only lasted from 2003 to 2005
- Sky also co-produced The 4400 and co-financed the first series of Battlestar Galactica in 2004
- Dream Team, about a fictional football team

Sky One also screened reality television shows such as:

- Cruise with Stelios
- Road Wars
- Shock Treatment
- World's Deadliest Gangs
- Pineapple Dance Studios
- World of Pain
- Road Raja
- Uncovered
- Cirque de Celebrité
- Hairspray: The School Musical

The channel received relative success with scientific shows such as:

- Brainiac: Science Abuse and spin-offs
  - Brainiac: History Abuse
  - Brainiac's Test Tube Baby
- Mission Implausible

Sky One commissioned a two-part Terry Pratchett's Hogfather series for Christmas 2006, this proved to be successful and so in 2008, Sky brought out an adaptation of The Colour of Magic and its second half The Light Fantastic. On 30 May 2010, Sky One also released Terry Pratchett's Going Postal, the 33rd book in the Discworld series.

Sky One had also re-commissioned a number of earlier game shows including Blockbusters, which brought the series back once again between 30 October 2000 and 23 March 2001 was produced by Grundy (now owns the format) and presented by Liza Tarbuck, but did not capture the same degree of popularity as the Holness incarnation. The most recent game show was from Mark Burnett's Are You Smarter than a 10 Year Old?, based on a United States format. On 30 January 2008, Sky One announced plans to bring back the British 1990s combat-based game show Gladiators, which was subsequently cancelled on 12 April 2009. They also showed the sketch show Harry Enfield's Brand Spanking New Show.

In 2010, Sky One focused on commissioning several quite long-running or well known comedy infused shows, starting with A League of Their Own, An Idiot Abroad and Little Crackers. In 2011, Sky One premiered supermarket sitcom Trollied, which had broadcast six series and over 50 episodes, becoming Sky One's longest running comedy series. Not all shows were well received, at least by its home country audience, including Parents which was broadcast in 2012 and was not popular, leading Sky not to commission it for a second series. Moone Boy, a series written by and starring Chris O'Dowd, first screened in 2012, became an instant hit internationally. It lasted three series, and ended in 2015.

In 2017, Sky One stopped showing factual content and moved to showing more comedy and drama programmes as well as selected sports coverage.

=== Music ===
American pop group E.Y.C. interview on the Coca-Cola Hit Mix weekly show

British singer Matt Goss on the music brand which would simultaneously broadcast on Sky One and Sky Two's Hit Mix (Long Play)

In 1994, Sky One started their own music show called The Coca Cola Hit Mix (also known as The Hit Mix) hosted by Terry Christian, featuring music news and guests at the time. The show featured regular competitions, phone-ins with guests and other features. This later evolved into a late night broadcast called Hit Mix Long Play which would broadcast simultaneously on both Sky One and Sky Two playing music videos from various genres; the show also featured themed topics such as "Step by Step" which would feature music videos with stairs in the song or video when the scheduled programming had finished. This became a popular part of the brand and would often have exclusive first play on new releases that week.

A later expansion of the music brand would be Sky One's Morning Glory show which would feature music videos in the early morning before the scheduled programming would start, which also featured various themes as well as caller requests.

=== Films ===
Sky One occasionally screened feature films which were shown with advertisement breaks, as well as several premium movie channels including Sky Cinema and its sister services.

=== American imports ===
The channel became known for its first-run American imports such as: Seinfeld, Rescue 911, Unsolved Mysteries, Buffy the Vampire Slayer and South Park, as well as some older programmes included Hill Street Blues, M*A*S*H, Quantum Leap and Lucille Ball's various comedy series. It relies heavily on screenings for this network as they coming from Rupert Murdoch's Fox Broadcasting Company with other shows like The X-Files, In Living Color, Cops, Millennium, King of the Hill, Futurama, Family Guy and Malcolm in the Middle. Another early and long-running fixture was Married... with Children ran all through the 1990s, but in the early 2000s as the show suddenly disappeared from its regular schedule and has not been screened on any Sky channel since.

Sky One was also the original home to the UK's first-run showings of ER and Friends for series 4–6 of both shows (Channel 4 had shown series 1–3 first), giving Sky One some of the highest ratings for any satellite channel. In 2000, 2.8 million viewers watched an episode of Friends, the highest-rated show on this network. However, when Channel 4 launched their own digital sister service E4 they outbid Sky One for exclusive first-run rights to both shows. However, Sky One still held the repeat rights for the early series of both shows for several years. Since 2011, Friends has been shown on Comedy Central.

==== WWF/WWE ====
From 1989, Sky Channel (later Sky One) was the home of World Wrestling Federation in the UK. Certain special events such as Royal Rumble, UK Rampage and This Tuesday in Texas aired on Sky One, whilst a live broadcast of WrestleMania VI and others include SummerSlam and Survivor Series, shown on taped delay a number of days after the events were recorded, aired on Sky Movies.

Sky moved all the special events to Sky Movies in 1991, before they transferred to Sky Sports on 1 September 1992 when the channel became a subscription service. From 1995, subscribers to the Sky Sports channel would see not only a taped delay showing of these pay-per-view events, but Sky also offered a live showing starting a midnight UK time on the evening the event took place. Sky One continued to air WWF/WWE shows on Friday night and Saturday/Sunday morning that were produced for syndicated television in the United States from the early 1990s until the late 2010s. Sky Sports aired Monday Night Raw and later SmackDown alongside all pay-per-view events and required an additional subscription to be able to view the Sports package, this led to the WWF/WWE content on Sky One being available to more viewers in the UK than the shows that aired only on Sky Sports.

While WWF/WWE pay-per-view events aired on Sky Sports, other shows include Superstars, Wrestling Challenge, All American Wrestling, Action Zone, Mania, LiveWire, Shotgun and Metal which aired on Saturday or Sunday exclusively on Sky One with repeats throughout the week on the channel. These were often shows edited for younger viewers to fit the timeslot (especially during the riskier content of the Attitude era) and had dubbed commentary especially for the UK audience.

Sky One continued to broadcast an edited one hour version of Raw on Sunday mornings before all WWE programmes moved to rival network BT Sport, which later rebranded as TNT Sports on 18 July 2023.

==== The Simpsons ====
On 2 September 1990, Sky One launched the hit American animated series The Simpsons which became a signature show and aired continuously on the channel for 31 years until it was ceased in 2021 (as well as the Sunday morning religious programme Hour of Power was another to remain the schedule during most of its run), it had a long association within the series from its early years and was used extensively in the channel's advertising campaigns. Sky One aired new episodes of the show on Sunday nights, later switching to Friday nights from 2010, whilst older episodes were shown in double bill slots on weeknights for many years, and on some occasions, as many as four episodes would be shown back-to-back on weeknights, usually with some kind of theme connecting them in some way.

Sky One was the exclusive British broadcaster of The Simpsons until it made its terrestrial debut on the BBC from 23 November 1996, where it continued until 7 May 2004, having lost the rights to Channel 4 on 18 February 2002. Typically, Channel 4 premieres episodes around three or four years after they have first aired on Sky One.

On 17 March 2009, Sky One broadcast the 20th season episode "In the Name of the Grandfather" for the first time – five days before its original US airing – to be shown in the United Kingdom as gathered over one million viewers. Sky One had also aired episodes within three days after its US first-run, including "Judge Me Tender" on 27 May 2010. In November 2012, The Simpsons was not broadcast on the timeshift service because BSkyB is prohibited from doing so under the current terms of their licensing agreement with 20th Century Fox Television Distribution included an on-screen message appears redirecting viewers to Sky One. As of 2017, The Simpsons is available to watch on the timeshifted channel.

Following the death of voice actress Marcia Wallace, Sky One broadcasts three of best episodes from 6:30 pm including "Bart the Lover", "The Ned-Liest Catch" and "Ned 'n' Edna's Blend Agenda" on 28 October 2013.

Since the closure of Sky One, episodes of the show have continued to be broadcast regularly on Sky Showcase.

==== Star Trek ====
Sky One obtained the first-run rights for Star Trek on 1 July 1990, which previously had been with the BBC. During its entire run of The Original Series, Sky One had chosen three episodes – "Plato's Stepchildren", "The Empath" and "Whom Gods Destroy" – as well as the unseen pilot were eventually shown on satellite television, but not screened by the BBC between 19 August 1992 and 19 January 1994 for similar reasons following audience complaints after broadcast.

The Next Generation was initially shown five nights a week at 5:00 pm (repeated again at 10:30 pm) between 5 October 1992 and 16 August 1993, starting with "Encounter at Farpoint" and running all the way up to "Timescape". The channel also acquired rerun rights to the episodes from the first three seasons previously aired on BBC2 – with the addition of "The High Ground", which saw its first British broadcast on 29 November 1992 with the Irish reunification line edited out, and a feature-length version of "Unification" was shown for an exclusive movie channel on 7 March 1993 rather than as part of this entire run. The whole series was shown again with "Descent" held over to act as the premiere to the seventh season on 31 July 1994, which was run every Sunday evenings at 7:00 pm once it had completed production and was available to be shown before the last-ever episode aired on 29 January 1995.

Sky One also bought the first-run rights for other Star Trek shows:

- Deep Space Nine (15 August 1993)
- Voyager (22 October 1995)
- Enterprise (6 January 2002)

The episodes of these later series were shown as they were in the United States with repeats between new ones, however soon held back broadcast the entire series at once, as well as various science-fiction shows that would fill the gaps including Stargate SG-1 and Andromeda. It was moved to Sky Two for a short time, until the channel was ceased on 31 August 1997 due to poor ratings. Monday nights at 8:00 pm was the traditional time for the series, however at the start of the fourth season of Enterprise was moved to Tuesdays within the place also taken by The Simpsons, which lasted until the final episode was broadcast on 2 August 2005.

=== Continuity announcers ===
Bruce Hammal was the station's continuity announcer from 1984 to 1997. Absolute Radio DJ Claire Sturgess has been a "voice" of Sky One since 1998, and was the sole announcer from 2001 until 2005. As one of Sky One's four announcers, her voice-overs were pre-recorded once a week and played out by an automated system.

Live continuity announcements aired each evening. In 2009, they were voiced by announcers Dave Kelly, Faye Bamford and Philippa Collins. In 2010, three new continuity announcers were hired, Katie Morton, Katie Hudson and Paul Daniels, replacing all the previous announcers. In 2011, two new part-time announcers were hired. During the day, pre-recorded announcements aired, promoting shows from all the different Sky channels.

=== Most watched ===
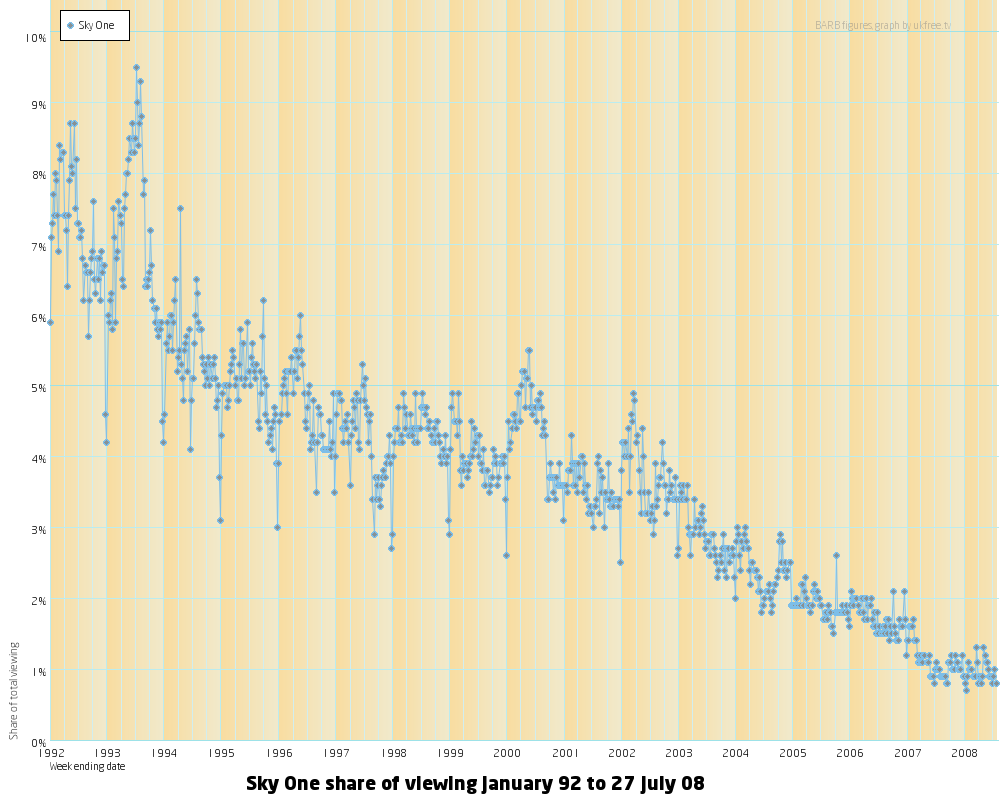
Sky One share of viewing 1992–2008. Peak was 9.5%, July 1993, current 0.9%.

The following is a list of the ten most watched shows on Sky One, based on Live +7 data supplied by BARB up to 30 November 2020, within the number of viewers does not include repeats:

Rank	Show	Episode	Number of viewers	Date
1	Friends: The Reunion		5,300,000	27 May 2021
2	Friends	6.01 – "The One After Vegas"	2,860,000	13 January 2000
3	An Idiot Abroad	2.01 – "Desert Island"	2,659,000	23 September 2011
4	An Idiot Abroad	2.07 – "Climb Mount Fuji"	2,656,000	4 November 2011
5	Terry Pratchett's Hogfather	"Part One"	2,647,000	17 December 2006
6	Friends	5.01 – "The One After Ross Says Rachel"	2,410,000	7 January 1999
7	Friends	5.15 – "The One with the Girl Who Hits Joey"	2,320,000	15 April 1999
8	An Idiot Abroad	2.08 – "Karl Comes Home"	2,302,000	11 November 2011
9	The Simpsons	17.15 – "Homer Simpson, This Is Your Wife"	2,301,000	23 April 2006
10	An Idiot Abroad	3.03 – "China"	2,260,000	14 December 2012
