= Coach Trip series 3 =

Season of television series

Coach Trip
- Series 3
- No. of days: 30
- Winners: Hannah & Katie
- Runners-up: Michelle & Sandra

Release
- Original network: Channel 4
- Original release: May 2009

Additional information
- Filming dates: September 2008 – October 2008

Series chronology
- ← Previous; Series 2 Next → Series 4

Coach Trip 3 is the third series of Coach Trip in the United Kingdom, that was filmed between September and October 2008 and began showing in May 2009. The show's format after a break of 3 years remained unchanged from the previous series but the titles were new along with the timeslot: seven couples travelling around Europe on a coach like series 1 for 30 days attempting vote off the least popular couples with visits to Croatia, the Czech Republic, Hungary, Liechtenstein and Luxembourg for the first time. Tour guide Brendan Sheerin and coach driver Paul Donald both returned for this series, which aired on Channel 4 with a similar end to series 2. David Quantick was the narrator and MT04 MTT was the registration number plate for the first and only time.

== Contestants ==
| Couple were aboard the coach | Couple got yellow carded |
| Couple were immune from votes | Couple got red carded |
Couple were not present at the vote
Vote was cancelled

| Couple | Relationship | Trip Duration (Days) | | | | | | | | | | | | | | | | | | | | | | | | | | | | | |
| Couple | Relationship | 1 | 2 | 3 | 4 | 5 | 6 | 7 | 8 | 9 | 10 | 11 | 12 | 13 | 14 | 15 | 16 | 17 | 18 | 19 | 20 | 21 | 22 | 23 | 24 | 25 | 26 | 27 | 28 | 29 | 30 |
|---|---|---|---|---|---|---|---|---|---|---|---|---|---|---|---|---|---|---|---|---|---|---|---|---|---|---|---|---|---|---|---|
| Hannah and Katie (replaced Caroline and Charli) | Friends | Not on coach | | | | | | | | | | | | | | | | | | | | | Yellow card | | | | | | | | Winners |
| Michelle and Sandra (replaced Joey and Luke) | Friends | Not on coach | | | | | | | | | | | | | | | | | | | | | | Yellow card | | | | | | | Second |
| Alexander and Paul (replaced Ann and Grace) | Friends | Not on coach | | | | | | | | | | | | | | | | | | | | | | | | | | Yellow card | | | Third |
| John and Michael (replaced Ann and Mark) | Friends | Not on coach | | | | | | | | | | | | | | | | | | | | | | | | | | | | | Third |
| Brian and Trish (replaced Betty and Daz) | Husband and wife | Not on coach | | | | | | | | | | | | | | | | | | | | | | | | | Yellow card | | | | Fourth |
| Fiona and Ian (replaced Matt and Tom) | Partners | Not on coach | | | | | | | | | | | | | | | | | | | | | | | | | | | Yellow card | | Fourth |
| Derith and Helen (replaced Delia and Jacqui) | Mother and daughter | Not on coach | | | | | | | | | | | | | | | | | | | | | | | | | | | | | Fourth |
| Delia and Jacqui (replaced James and Tracy) | Club owners | Not on coach | | | | | | | | | | | | | | | | | | | | | | | | | | Walked 4th | | | |
| Matt and Tom (original 7) | Friends | | | | | | | | | | | | | | | | Yellow card | | | | | | | | | Red card | Eliminated 11th | | | | |
| James and Tracey (replaced Anne and Geoff) | Partners | Not on coach | | | | Yellow card | | | | | | | | | | | | | | | | | | | Red card | Eliminated 10th | | | | | |
| Ann and Mark (replaced Deanne and William) | Partners | Not on coach | | | | | | | | | | | | | | | | | | | Yellow card | Red card | Eliminated 9th | | | | | | | | |
| Ann and Grace (replaced Krishan and Scott) | Sisters | Not on coach | | | | | | | | | | | | | | | | | | | | Walked 3rd | | | | | | | | | |
| Joey and Luke (replaced Holly and Taryn) | Friends | Not on coach | | | | | | | | | | | | | | | | Yellow card | Red card | Eliminated 8th | | | | | | | | | | | |
| Betty and Daz (replaced Jackie and Susan) | Mother and son | Not on coach | | | | | | | | | | | Yellow card | | | Red card | Eliminated 7th | | | | | | | | | | | | | | |
| Holly and Taryn (original 7) | Friends | | | | | | | | | | | | | | | Walked 2nd | | | | | | | | | | | | | | | |
| Deanne and William (original 7) | Friends | | | Yellow card | | | | | | | | | | | Red card | Eliminated 6th | | | | | | | | | | | | | | | |
| Caroline and Charli (replaced Colin and Diane) | Mother and daughter | Not on coach | | | | | | | | | | Yellow card | | Red card | Eliminated 5th | | | | | | | | | | | | | | | | |
| Krishan and Scott (replaced Graham and Ivy) | Friends | Not on coach | | | | | | | | Yellow card | Red card | Eliminated 4th | | | | | | | | | | | | | | | | | | | |
| Jackie and Susan (original 7) | Friends | | | | | | | | | | Walked 1st | | | | | | | | | | | | | | | | | | | | |
| Colin and Diane (original 7) | Husband and wife | | | | | | | Yellow card | Red card | Eliminated 3rd | | | | | | | | | | | | | | | | | | | | | |
| Graham and Ivy (original 7) | Partners | | | | Yellow card | | Red card | Eliminated 2nd | | | | | | | | | | | | | | | | | | | | | | | |
| Anne and Geoff (original 7) | Husband and wife | Yellow card | Red card | Eliminated 1st | | | | | | | | | | | | | | | | | | | | | | | | | | | |

== Voting History ==
| Couple won the series | Couple were yellow carded | Vote was cancelled |
| Couple were runners up | Couple were red carded | Couple were not present at the vote |
| Couple came third | Couple were immune from votes |
| Couple came fourth | Couple left the coach |

| | Day | | | | | | | | | | | | | | | | | | | | | | | | | | | | | |
| | 1 | 2 | 3 | 4 | 5 | 6 | 7 | 8 | 9 | 10 | 11 | 12 | 13 | 14 | 15 | 16 | 17 | 18 | 19 | 20 | 21 | 22 | 23 | 24 | 25 | 26 | 27 | 28 | 29 | 30 |
|---|---|---|---|---|---|---|---|---|---|---|---|---|---|---|---|---|---|---|---|---|---|---|---|---|---|---|---|---|---|---|
| Hannah Katie | Not on coach | | | | | | | | | | | | | Ann; Grace | James; Tracy | Matt; Tom | James; Tracy | James; Tracy | Cancelled | Brian; Trish | Mark; Ann | James; Tracy | James; Tracy | James; Tracy | Matt; Tom | Brian; Trish | Alexander; Paul | John; Michael | Sandra; Michelle | Winners; 3 votes |
| Sandra Michelle | Not on coach | | | | | | | | | | | | | | | | | | | Mark; Ann | Mark; Ann | James; Tracy | James; Tracy | James; Tracy | Alexander; Paul | Brian; Trish | Alexander; Paul | Ian; Fiona | Hannah; Katie | Second; 2 votes |
| Alexander Paul | Not on coach | | | | | | | | | | | | | | | | | | | | Mark; Ann | Hannah; Katie | Sandra; Michelle | James; Tracy | Matt; Tom | Brian; Trish | John; Michael | Ian; Fiona | John; Michael | Third; 1 vote |
| John Michael | Not on coach | | | | | | | | | | | | | | | | | | | | | | Matt; Tom | James; Tracy | Matt; Tom | Brian; Trish | Alexander; Paul | Brian; Trish | Alexander; Paul | Third; 1 vote |
| Brian Trish | Not on coach | | | | | | | | | | | | | | | | Hannah; Katie | Luke; Joey | Cancelled | Mark; Ann | Mark; Ann | Alexander; Paul | Sandra; Michelle | Hannah; Katie | Matt; Tom | Alexander; Paul | Alexander; Paul | John; Michael | Sandra; Michelle | Fourth; 0 votes |
| Ian Fiona | Not on coach | | | | | | | | | | | | | | | | | | | | | | | | | | Alexander; Paul | Alexander; Paul | Hannah; Katie | Fourth; 0 votes |
| Derith Helen | Not on coach | | | | | | | | | | | | | | | | | | | | | | | | | | | Ian; Fiona | Hannah; Katie | Fourth; 0 votes |
| Delia Jacqui | Not on coach | | | | | | | | | | | | | | | | | | | | | | | | | John; Michael ^{3} | Walked (end of Day 26) | | | |
| Matt Tom | Colin; Diane | Geoff; Anne | William; Deanne | William; Deanne | James; Tracy | Colin; Diane | Colin; Diane | Colin; Diane | William; Deanne | Krishan; Scott | Caroline; Charli | Daz; Betty | Caroline; Charli | William; Deanne | Daz; Betty | Ann; Grace | Luke; Joey | Luke; Joey | Cancelled | Mark; Ann | Mark; Ann | Hannah; Katie | Sandra; Michelle | Hannah; Katie | Alexander; Paul | Red Carded (Day 25) | | | | |
| James Tracy | Not on coach | | | Holly; Taryn | Matt; Tom | Graham; Ivy | Jackie; Susan | Jackie; Susan | Krishan; Scott | Krishan; Scott | Caroline; Charli | Daz; Betty | Caroline; Charli | William; Deanne | Daz; Betty | Hannah; Katie | Luke; Joey | Luke; Joey | Cancelled | Mark; Ann | Mark; Ann | Hannah; Katie | Sandra; Michelle | Hannah; Katie ^{2} | Red Carded (Day 24) | | | | | |
| Mark Ann | Not on coach | | | | | | | | | | | | | | Ann; Grace | Matt; Tom | James; Tracy | James; Tracy | Cancelled | Matt; Tom | Brian; Trish | Red Carded (Day 21) | | | | | | | | |
| Ann Grace | Not on coach | | | | | | | | | | | James; Tracy | James; Tracy | Matt; Tom | Hannah; Katie | Mark; Ann | Luke; Joey | Luke; Joey | Cancelled | | Walked (Day 20) | | | | | | | | | |
| Luke Joey | Not on coach | | | | | | | | | | | | | | | Matt; Tom | James; Tracy | James; Tracy | Red Carded (Day 18) | | | | | | | | | | | |
| Daz Betty | Not on coach | | | | | | | | | William; Deanne | William; Deanne | James; Tracy | James; Tracy | Matt; Tom | James; Tracy | Red Carded (Day 15) | | | | | | | | | | | | | | |
| Holly Taryn | Goeff; Anne | Geoff; Anne | William; Deanne | Colin; Diane | James; Tracy | Colin; Diane | Colin; Diane | William; Deanne | Jackie; Susan | Krishan; Scott | Caroline; Charli | Daz; Betty | Caroline; Charli | William; Deanne | Walked (end of Day 14) | | | | | | | | | | | | | | | |
| William Deanne | Geoff; Anne | Holly; Taryn | Colin; Diane | Graham; Ivy | Matt; Tom | Graham; Ivy | Matt; Tom | Matt; Tom | Krishan; Scott | Krishan; Scott | Caroline; Charli | Daz; Betty | Daz; Betty | Matt; Tom | Red Carded (Day 14) | | | | | | | | | | | | | | | |
| Caroline Charli | Not on coach | | | | | | | | | Holly; Taryn | William; Deanne | James; Tracy | James; Tracy | Red Carded (Day 13) | | | | | | | | | | | | | | | | |
| Krishan Scott | Not on coach | | | | | | | Colin; Diane | William; Deanne | William; Deanne | Red Carded (Day 10) | | | | | | | | | | | | | | | | | | | |
| Jackie Susan | Geoff; Anne | Geoff; Anne | Colin; Diane | Graham; Ivy | Graham; Ivy | James; Tracy | James; Tracy | James; Tracy | Krishan; Scott | Walked (Day 9) | | | | | | | | | | | | | | | | | | | | |
| Colin Diane | Matt; Tom | Holly; Taryn | William; Deanne | Jackie; Susan | Graham; Ivy | Graham; Ivy | Holly; Taryn | Holly; Taryn | Red Carded (Day 8) | | | | | | | | | | | | | | | | | | | | | |
| Graham Ivy | Geoff; Anne | Geoff; Anne | Colin; Diane | Jackie; Susan | James; Tracy | Colin; Diane | Red Carded (Day 6) | | | | | | | | | | | | | | | | | | | | | | | |
| Geoff Anne | Jackie; Susan | Graham; Ivy | Red Carded (Day 2) | | | | | | | | | | | | | | | | | | | | | | | | | | | |
| Walked | None | | | | | | | | Jackie; Susan | None | | | | Holly; Taryn | None | | | | | Ann; Grace | None | | | | | Delia; Jacqui^{3} | None | | | |
| Voted Off | Geoff; Anne; 4 votes | Geoff; Anne; 4 votes | William; Deanne; 3 votes | Graham; Ivy; 2 votes | James; Tracy; 3 votes | Graham; Ivy; 3 votes | Colin; Diane; 2votes | Colin; Diane; 2 votes | Krishan; Scott; 3 votes | Krishan; Scott; 4 votes | Caroline; Charli; 4 votes | Daz; Betty; 4 votes | Caroline; Charli; 3 votes | William; Deanne; 3 votes | Daz; Betty; 2 votes | Matt; Tom; 3 votes | Luke; Joey; 3 votes | Luke; Joey; 4 votes | None | Mark; Ann; 4 votes | Mark; Ann; 6 votes | Hannah; Katie; 3 votes | Sandra; Michelle; 4 votes | James; Tracy; 4 votes | Matt; Tom; 4 votes | Brian; Trish; 4 votes | Alexander; Paul; 5 votes | Ian; Fiona; 3 votes | None | |

=== Notes ===
- ^1 After the vote was cancelled with 2 couples absent, Sandra & Michelle were post-vote arrivals on Day 19.
- ^2 On Day 24, due to the announcement of the red terror, Brendan instated a new voting rule - on vote time the couple who received the most votes would get an immediate red card, this happened to be James & Tracy, this system used after arrival in Hungary and also returned on Celebrity Coach Trip, Series 6, series 7 and Christmas Coach Trip.
- ^3 Delia & Jacqui walked off the trip on the same day as when they arrived after only 16 hours due to arguments with Brendan.

No timekeepers or removals in series

== The trip day by day ==
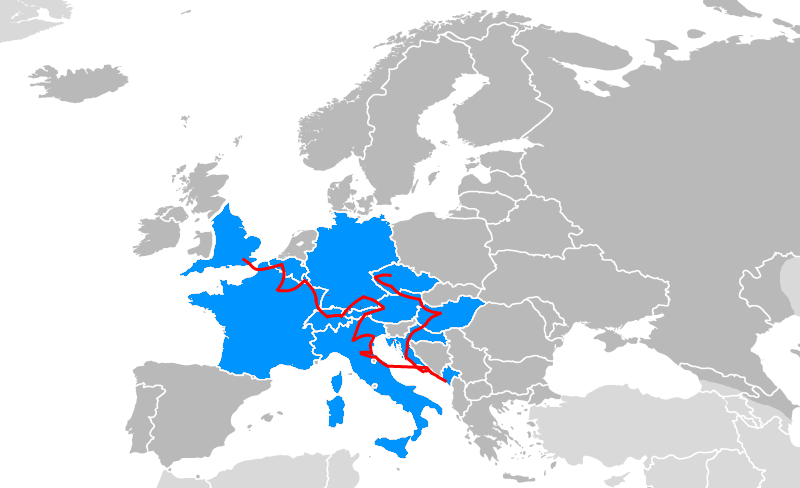
The route of the third series

| Day | Location | Activity | |
| Day | Location | Morning | Afternoon |
|---|---|---|---|
| 1 | Antwerp | | |
| 2 | Reims | World War II Surrender Museum | Champagne house |
| 3 | Luxembourg | City tour | Pottery class |
| 4 | Strasbourg & Rust | Alsatian cooking class | Theme park |
| 5 | Mount Titlis | | |
| 6 | Lucerne & Vitznau | | |
| 7 | Liechtenstein | | |
| 8 | Munich | Olympic stadium | |
| 9 | Salzburg | Hitler's Eagle's nest | |
| 10 | Innsbruck | Yodel lesson | Bobsleigh ride |
| 11 | Lake Garda | Sailing lesson | |
| 12 | Venice | | |
| 13 | Comacchio & Ravenna | Eel farm | |
| 14 | Bologna | Italian lesson | Vineyard trip |
| 15 | Cesenatico | | |
| 16 | Conero & Ancona | Limestone caves | |
| 17 | Makarska | | |
| 18 | Dubrovnik | City wall walk | |
| 19 | Montenegro | | |
| 20 | Split | Croatian watersports | |
| 21 | Zadar | Boat tour | |
| 22 | Lake Plitvice | Plitvice Lakes National Park | |
| 23 | Zagreb | | |
| 24 | Hévíz | | |
| 25 | Budapest | Goulash making | |
| 26 | Vienna | Musical treats | |
| 27 | Český Krumlov | White water rafting | Brewery tour |
| 28 | Marienbad | Spa | |
| 29 | Prague | Puppet museum | Vintage tram ride |
| 30 | As the 14 tourists who have made it to the end of the line head home to the UK, Brendan looks back on his favourite and funniest moments of the 30-day tour. | | |
