= Coach Trip series 6 =

Coach Trip
- Series 6
- No. of days: 30
- Winners: Rob & Timmy
- Runners-up: Hilary & Terry

Release
- Original network: Channel 4
- Original release: 14 February – 25 March 2011

Additional information
- Filming dates: July 2010 – August 2010

Series chronology
- ← Previous; Series 5 Next → Series 7

Coach Trip 6 is the sixth series of Coach Trip in the United Kingdom. It was filmed from July until August 2010 (before the Arab Spring protests began) and aired from 14 February to 25 March 2011. The voting system rules reverted to those of earlier series. The length of this series was the same as the previous non-celebrity series but with weekends excluded. The tour visited Mediterranean countries like series 2 but with visits to Switzerland added for a month. Tour guide Brendan Sheerin, coach driver Paul Donald, narrator Dave Vitty and the coach with registration number MT09 MTT all returned for this series, which was aired on Channel 4 with a similar start to series 2 and a similar end to series 4.

== Contestants ==
Couple were aboard the coach	Couple got yellow carded	Couple were removed from the coach
Couple were immune from votes	Couple got red carded
Couple left the coach	Couple were not present at the vote

Couple	Relationship	Trip Duration (Days)																													
Couple	Relationship	1	2	3	4	5	6	7	8	9	10	11	12	13	14	15	16	17	18	19	20	21	22	23	24	25	26	27	28	29	30
Rob & Timmy (original 7)	Students & Best Friends											Yellow card																			Winners on 25 March 2011
Terry & Hilary (original 7)	Husband & Wife																								Yellow card						Second on 25 March 2011
Sharon & Tressa (replaced Val & Margaret)	Best Friends	Not on coach																										Yellow card			Third on 25 March 2011
Sarah & Lucy (replaced Andrew & Leah)	Friends	Not on coach																									Yellow card				Fourth on 25 March 2011
Shaun & Tom (replaced Gary & Alan)	Friends	Not on coach																											Yellow card		Fourth on 25 March 2011
Daniel & David (replaced Karen & Ben)	Father & Son	Not on coach																													Fourth on 25 March 2011
Wayne & Emma (replaced Bob & Phil)	Partners	Not on coach																						Yellow card							Walked 3rd on 22 March 2011
Karen & Ben (replaced Jaki & Janice)	Aunt & Nephew	Not on coach																								Red card	Eliminated 11th on 18 March 2011				
Val & Margaret (replaced Nav & Anna)	Friends	Not on coach									Yellow card												Red card	Eliminated 10th on 15 March 2011							
Jaki & Janice (replaced Mary & Darron)	Sisters	Not on coach																				Yellow card	Red card	Removed 2nd on 15 March 2011							
Alan & Gary (replaced Barbara & Elaina)	Twins	Not on coach																		Yellow card	Red card	Eliminated 9th on 11 March 2011									
Andrew & Leah (replaced Mike & Shane)	Friends	Not on coach																Yellow card	Red card	Eliminated 8th on 9 March 2011 day 18											
Barbara & Elaina (original 7)	Best Friends	Yellow card															Red card	Eliminated 7th on 7 March 2011													
Mary & Darron (replaced Jasmin & Rara)	Husband & Wife	Not on coach												Yellow card		Red card	Eliminated 6th on 4 March 2011														
Mike & Shane (replaced David & Amanda)	Father & Son	Not on coach											Yellow card		Red card	Eliminated 5th on 3 March 2011															
Jasmin & Rara (replaced Jane & Jayne)	Aunt & Niece	Not on coach									Red card	Removed 1st on 25 February 2011																			
David & Amanda (replaced David & Amanda)	Father & Daughter	Not on coach							Yellow card	Red card	Eliminated 4th on 24 February 2011																				
Nav & Anna (replaced Ruth & Steve)	Husband & Wife	Not on coach					Yellow card	Red card	Eliminated 3rd on 22 February 2011																						
Bob & Phil (original 7)	Best Friends								Walked 2nd 22 February 2011																						
Wendy & Darren (original 7)	Mother & Son				Yellow card	Red card	Eliminated 2nd on 18 February 2011																								
Jane & Jayne (original 7)	Best Friends						Walked 1st on 18 February 2011																								
Ruth & Steve (original 7)	Husband & Wife		Yellow card	Red card	Eliminated 1st on 16 February 2011																										

=== Contestants Notes (In Order of elimination and withdrawal) ===
- Ruth & Steve, newly-wed husband and wife from Preston but originally from Glasgow, Scotland and on their honeymoon. First to leave due to being very unpopular because of their relentless moaning. (Original 7. Red-carded on Day 3.)
- Jane & Jayne, two teachers and best friends from The Midlands (Original 7. Walked on Day 5 due to exhaustion from 0–3 star hotels and missing their children.)
- Wendy & Darren, mother and son from Moreton, The Wirral. (Original 7. Red-carded on Day 5.)
- Bob & Phil, best friends from Southampton. (Original 7. Walked at the beginning of Day 7 due to leg injury.)
- Nav & Anna, husband and wife from Manchester. (Joined on Day 5 replacing Ruth & Steve. Red-carded on Day 7.)
- David & Amanda, father and daughter from Yorkshire. (Joined on Day 6 replacing Wendy & Darren. Red-carded on Day 9.)
- Jasmin & Rara, aunt and niece from Sheffield. (Joined on Day 6 replacing Jane & Jayne. Red-carded on Day 10 for bad behaviour and refusing to get out of bed, this result previously held by Alan & Lorenzo of series two.)
- Mike & Shane, father and son from Ormskirk. (Joined on Day 11 replacing David & Amanda. Red-carded on Day 14.)
- Mary & Darron, husband and wife from Chatham, but originally from East London. (Joined on Day 12 replacing Jasmin & Rara. Red-carded on Day 15.)
- Barbara & Elaina, best friends from Central London, but originally from Uganda. (Original 7. Red-carded on Day 16.)
- Andrew & Leah, friends from Liverpool. (Joined on Day 16 replacing Mike & Shane. Red-carded on Day 18.)
- Alan & Gary, twins from Northern Ireland. (Joined on Day 18 replacing Barbara & Elaina. Red-carded on Day 20.)
- Jaki & Janice, sisters from North London. (Joined on Day 17 replacing Mary & Darron. Red-carded on Day 22 for manipulating the previous days vote and canvassing for votes at the same time to be eliminated.)
- Val & Margaret, friends from Newcastle. (Joined on Day 9 replacing Nav & Anna. Red-carded on Day 22.)
- Karen & Ben, aunt and nephew from Essex. (Joined on Day 24 replacing Jaki & Janice. Red-carded on Day 25, after the announcement was made that whoever received the most votes that day would be instantly sent home despite whether they were currently on a yellow card or not.)
- Wayne & Emma, partners for 7 years from ?. (Joined after lunch on Day 8 replacing Bob & Phil. Walked at the beginning of Day 29 due to ankle injury.)
- Hilary & Terry, husband and wife from Workington, Cumbria. (Original 7. Lasted until Final Day.)
- Rob & Timmy, students and best friends from Essex. (Original 7. Winners.)
- Sarah & Lucy, friends from Newcastle. (Joined on Day 20 replacing Andrew & Leah. Lasted until Final Day.)
- Shaun & Tom, students and friends from the University of Nottingham. (Joined on Day 22 replacing Gary & Alan. Lasted until Final Day.)
- Sharon & Tressa, best friends from Morecambe. (Joined on Day 25 replacing Val & Margaret. Lasted until Final Day.)
- David & Daniel, father and son from Coventry. (Joined on Day 28 replacing Karen & Ben. Lasted until Final Day.)

(Note: Contestants in italics yellow-carded without being voted off and left without being voted off).

== Voting history ==
Indicates that the couple received a yellow card
Indicates that the couple was red carded off the trip
Indicates that the couple were removed from the coach
Indicates that the couple left the coach due to other reasons than being voted off or being removed from the coach
Indicates that the couple was immune from any votes cast against them due to it either being their first vote or winning immunity from the vote
Indicates that the couple were voted as the most popular couple and won series
Indicates that the couple were voted as the second most popular couple
Indicates that the couple were voted as the third most popular couple
Indicates that the couple were voted as the fourth most popular couple

	Day																													
	1	2	3	4	5	6	7	8	9	10	11	12	13	14	15	16	17	18	19	20	21	22	23	24	25	26	27	28	29	30
Rob Timmy	Wendy; Darren	Ruth; Steve	Ruth; Steve	Wendy; Darren	Wendy; Darren	Nav; Anna	David; Amanda	David; Amanda	David; Amanda	Val; Margaret	Val; Margaret	Mike; Shane	Darron; Mary	Shane; Mike	Darron; Mary	Barbara; Elaina	Andrew; Leah	Andrew; Leah	Gary; Alan	Gary; Alan	Janice; Jaki	Sarah; Lucy	Wayne; Emma	Hilary; Terry	Karen; Ben	Lucy; Sarah	Sharon; Tressa	Shaun; Tom	Terry; Hilary	Winners; 3 votes
Terry Hilary	Barbara; Elaina	Rob; Timmy	Bob; Phil	Jane; Jayne	Bob; Phil	Nav; Anna	Jasmine; Rara	Jasmine; Rara	Jasmine; Rara	Val; Margaret	Wayne; Emma	Mike; Shane	Mary; Darron	Shane; Mike	Darron; Mary	Barbara; Elaina	Andrew; Leah	Andrew; Leah	Alan; Gary	Janice; Jaki	Jaki; Janice	Val; Margaret	Sarah; Lucy	Sarah; Lucy	Shaun; Tom	Sarah; Lucy	Tressa; Sharon	Shaun; Tom	Rob; Timmy	Second; 2 votes
Sharon Tressa	Not on Coach																								Sarah; Lucy	Hilary; Terry	Hilary; Terry	Tom; Shaun	Rob; Timmy	Third; 1 vote
Sarah Lucy	Not on Coach																			Rob; Timmy	Janice; Jaki	Val; Margaret	Wayne; Emma	Hilary; Terry	Karen; Ben	Hilary; Terry	Shaun; Tom	Shaun; Tom	Rob; Timmy	Fourth; 0 votes
Shaun Tom	Not on Coach																					Val; Margaret	Terry; Hilary	Terry; Hilary	Ben; Karen	Sarah; Lucy	Sharon; Tressa	Rob; Timmy	Terry; Hilary	Fourth; 0 votes
David Daniel	Not on Coach																											Shaun; Tom	Sharon; Tressa	Fourth; 0 votes
Wayne Emma	Not on Coach							David; Amanda	David; Amanda	Val; Margaret	Hilary; Terry	Mike; Shane	Darron; Mary	Mike; Shane	Barbara; Elaina	Barbara; Elaina	Andrew; Leah	Andrew; Leah	Gary; Alan	Gary; Alan	Janice; Jaki	Sarah; Lucy	Rob; Timmy	Lucy; Sarah	Ben; Karen	Sarah; Lucy	Sharon; Tressa	Shaun; Tom	Walked (Day 29)^{4}	
Karen Ben	Not on Coach																							Rob; Timmy	Sarah; Lucy ^{3}	Red Carded (Day 25)				
Val Margaret	Not on Coach								Barbara; Elaina	Hilary; Terry	Rob; Timmy	Barbara; Elaina	Mary; Darron	Shane; Mike	Mary; Darron	Elaina; Barbara	Leah; Andrew	Emma; Wayne	Janice; Jaki	Gary; Alan	Sarah; Lucy	Hilary; Terry	Red Carded (Day 22)							
Jaki Janice	Not on Coach																Terry; Hilary	Hilary; Terry	Rob; Timmy	Rob; Timmy	Wayne; Emma	^{See; Note 2}	Removed (Day 22)							
Alan Gary	Not on Coach																	Hilary; Terry	Rob; Timmy	Rob; Timmy	Red Carded (Day 20)									
Andrew Leah	Not on Coach															Barbara; Elaina	Hilary; Terry	Hilary; Terry	Red Carded (Day 18)											
Barbara Elaina	Wendy; Darren	Wendy; Darren	Ruth; Steve	Wendy; Darren	Wendy; Darren	Nav; Anna	Nav; Anna	David; Amanda	David; Amanda	Val; Margaret	Val; Margaret	Mike; Shane	Val; Margaret	Shane; Mike	Wayne; Emma	Hilary; Terry	Red Carded (Day 16)													
Mary Darron	Not on Coach											Terry; Hilary	Val; Margaret	Shane; Mike	Hilary; Terry	Red Carded (Day 15)														
Mike Shane	Not on Coach										Rob; Timmy	Wayne; Emma	Darron; Mary	Rob; Timmy	Red Carded (Day 14)															
Jasmine Rara	Not on Coach					Terry; Hilary	Nav; Anna	Terry; Hilary	Terry; Hilary	^{See; Note 1}	Removed (Day 10)																			
David Amanda	Not on Coach					Rob; Timmy	Barbara; Elaina	Jasmine; Rara	Barbara; Elaina	Red Carded (Day 9)																				
Nav Anna	Not on Coach				Wendy; Darren	Terry; Hilary	David; Amanda	Red Carded (Day 7)																						
Bob Phil	Jane; Jayne	Terry; Hilary	Ruth; Steve	Wendy; Darren	Wendy; Darren	Terry; Hilary	Walked (beginning of Day 7)																							
Wendy Darren	Barbara; Elaina	Ruth; Steve	Barbara; Elaina	Jane; Jayne	Barbara; Elaina	Red Carded (Day 5)																								
Jane Jayne	Bob; Phil	Ruth; Steve	Ruth; Steve	Wendy; Darren	Walked (Day 5)																									
Ruth Steve	Barbara; Elaina	Jane; Jayne	Barbara; Elaina	Red Carded (Day 3)																										
Walked	none				Jane; Jayne	none	Bob; Phil	none																					Wayne; Emma	none
Timekeeping	none									Jasmin; Rara	none																			
Removed	none									Jasmin; Rara	none											Jaki; Janice	none							
Voted Off	Barbara; Elaina; 3 votes	Ruth; Steve; 3 votes	Ruth; Steve; 4 votes	Wendy; Darren; 4 votes	Wendy; Darren; 4 votes	Nav; Anna; 3 votes	Nav; Anna; 3 votes	David; Amanda; 3 votes	David; Amanda; 3 votes	Val; Margaret; 4 votes	Rob; Timmy; 2 votes	Mike; Shane; 4 votes	Mary; Darron; 5 votes	Shane; Mike; 6 votes	Mary; Darron; 3 votes	Barbara; Elaina; 5 votes	Andrew; Leah; 4 votes	Andrew; Leah; 3 votes	Alan; Gary; 3 votes	Alan; Gary; 3 votes	Janice; Jaki; 4 votes	Val; Margaret; 3 votes	Wayne; Emma; 2 votes	Hilary; Terry; 3 votes	Karen; Ben; 4 votes^3	Sarah; Lucy; 4 votes	Sharon; Tressa; 4 votes	Shaun; Tom; 6 votes	none	

== Notes ==
- ^1 Jasmine & Rara were removed with a red card on Day 10 for inappropriate behaviour during the previous night, including being drunk and disorderly, verbally abusing the hotel staff, doing a striptease in front of the hotel, and apparently damaging another guest's car. Moreover, they refused to get out of bed or admit any wrongdoing on the morning of Day 10, leading to their red card previously held by Alan & Lorenzo of series 2.
- ^2 Jaki & Janice were removed with a red card on Day 22 for overtaking the Day 21's vote and as they canvassed for votes during the day due to being tired and annoyed with their fellow passengers.
- ^3 On Day 25, due to the announcement of the red terror and the bullfighting activity, Brendan instated the voting rule previously introduced on Day 24 of series 3 and Day 5 of series 1 of celebrity coach trip - on vote time the couple who received the most votes would get an immediate red card, this happened to be Karen & Ben.
- ^4 Wayne & Emma walked at the beginning of Day 29 due to a foot injury.

No post-vote arrivals in series

== The Trip Day-by-Day ==
Day	Location	Activity	
Day	Location	Morning	Afternoon
1	Milan	Opera lesson	
2	Lago Maggiore	Lake swimming	Rubber tobogganing
3	Saas-Fee & Zermatt	Mountain tour	Skiing
4	Sierre	Underground lake tour	Alpine horn blowing
5	Lake Geneva	Wakeboarding	Music Festival
6	Lyon	Boules	French language lesson
7	Clermont-Ferrand	Culture lesson	Theme park
8	Brive-la-Gaillarde	Truffle hunting	Relationship-building
9	Bordeaux	Oyster sampling	Catamaran sailing
10	Mimizan	Stilt walking	
11	San Sebastián	Basque lesson	Pelota
12	Pamplona	Churros making	Cricket
13	Bilbao	Rural sports	Surfing
14	Santander	Golf	
15	Gijón	Cider farm	Fishing
16	Oviedo & Viveiro	Health spa	Quad bike racing
17	A Coruña	Cubist art lesson	Galician folk music
18	Santiago de Compostela		
19	Porto	Tripe cooking lesson	
20	Aveiro, Portugal	Sweet egg making	
21	Óbidos, Portugal	Yoga lesson	Medieval adventure
22	Lisbon	Electric buggy tour	
23	Évora	Treasure hunt	Ostrich farm
24	Faro & Vilamoura	Dolphin watching	Water park
25	Seville	Flamenco dancing	Bullfighting lesson
26	Cadiz	Paella cooking	Bowl-making lesson
27	Tarifa	Archery lesson	Sand sculpture competition
28	Morocco (Part 1)	Tangiers souk	Perfume making
29	Morocco (Part 2)	Belly dancing lesson	
30	The coach heads back to Málaga Airport, so the couples can head home. Brendan looks back over the series at his favourite activities.		
