= Christmas Coach Trip =

Reality TV series

- No. of days: 15
- Winners: Diana and Rebecca
- Runners-up: Cliff and Tom

Release
- Original network: Channel 4
- Original release: 12 December – 30 December 2011

Additional information
- Filming dates: 28 November – 12 December 2011

Christmas Coach Trip was the first and only series of a Christmas-themed version of Coach Trip. Filming for this series took place from 28 November to 12 December 2011 and aired on 12 December 2011. On this 15-day tour, the couples get to vote off the other couples that they do not get along with and on the last day of the coach trip the remaining couples vote for the couple that they want to win. The first day of the coach trip started in Trondheim and the last day of the trip ended in Inari.

== Contestants ==
Indicates the couple were aboard the coach
Indicates the couple were immune from votes
Indicates that the most popular couple received a christmas present with the most votes
Indicates that the couple were voted as the most popular couple and won series
Indicates that the couple were voted as the second most popular couple
Indicates that the couple were voted as the third most popular couple
Indicates that the couple were voted as the fourth most popular couple
Indicates the couple got a yellow card
Indicates the couple got a red card

Couple	Relationship	Trip Duration (Days)														
Couple	Relationship	1	2	3	4	5	6	7	8	9	10	11	12	13	14	15
Ali and Bev (original 7)	Twins		Yellow card	Red card	Eliminated 1st											
Amber and Kiran (replaced Ali and Bev)	Step-mom and daughter	Not on coach						Yellow card	Red card	Eliminated 2nd						
Gary and Faye (original 7)	Club Reps				Yellow card					Red card	Eliminated 3rd					
Sandrea and Shriley (original 7)	Mother and daughter					Yellow card					Red card	Eliminated 4th				
Jamie and Steven (original 7)	Fiancés												Red card	Eliminated 5th		
Karen and Sarah (replaced Gary and Faye)	Friends	Not on coach												Yellow card		Fourth
Jake and Louis (replaced Amber and Kiran)	Friends	Not on coach														Fourth
Stef and Tasha (original 7)	Best friends	Yellow card														Fourth
Dot and Geoff (replaced Jamie and Steven)	Friends	Not on coach													Yellow card	Third
Ange and Angel (replaced Sandrea and Shirley)	Friends	Not on coach														Third
Cliff and Tom (original 7)	Friends															Second
Diana and Rebecca (original 7)	Best friends															Winner

== Christmas Voting History ==
Indicates that the couple received a yellow card
Indicates that the couple was red carded off the trip
Indicates that the most popular couple received a christmas present with the most votes
Indicates that the couple was immune from any votes cast against them due to it either being their first vote or winning immunity from the vote
Indicates that the couple were voted as the most popular couple and won series
Indicates that the couple were voted as the second most popular couple
Indicates that the couple were voted as the third most popular couple
Indicates that the couple were voted as the fourth most popular couple

	Day															
	1	2	3	4	5	6	7	8	9	10	11	12	13	14	15	
Diana Rebecca	Stef; Tasha	Ali; Bev	Ali; Bev	Cliff; Tom	Sandrea; Shirley	Gary; Faye	Amber; Kiran	Jamie; Steven	Sandrea; Shirley	Stef; Tasha	Jamie; Steven	Stef; Tasha	Karen; Sarah	Dot; Geoff	Cliff; Tom	Winner; 3 votes
Cliff Tom	Diana; Rebecca	Ali; Bev	Ali; Bev	Gary; Faye	Sandrea; Shirley	Sandrea; Shirley	Amber; Kiran	Gary; Faye	Gary; Faye	Sandrea; Shirley	Stef; Tash	Jamie; Steven	Karen; Sarah	Jake; Louis	Diana; Rebecca	Second; 2 votes
Ange Angel	Not on coach										Jake; Louis	Jamie; Steven	Cliff; Tom	Dot; Geof	Diana; Rebecca	Third; 1 votes
Dot Geoff	Not on coach												Ange; Angel	Cliff; Tom	Diana; Rebecca	Third; 1 votes
Stef Tasha	Ali; Bev	Jamie; Steven	Ali; Bev	Gary; Faye	Jamie; Steven	Diana; Rebecca	Amber; Kiran	Amber; Kiran	Gary; Faye	Diana; Rebecca	Cliff; Tom	Jamie; Steven	Jake; Louis	Ange; Angel	Cliff; Tom	Fourth; 0 votes
Jake Louis	Not on coach										Diana; Rebecca	Stef; Tasha	Karen; Sarah	Cliff; Tom	Ange; Angel	Fourth; 0 votes
Karen Sarah	Not on coach											Cliff; Tom	Jake; Louis	Dot; Geoff	Dot; Geoff	Fourth; 0 votes
Jaime Steven	Stef; Tasha	Ali; Bev	Ali; Bev	Gary; Faye	Sandrea; Shirley	Diana; Rebecca	Amber; Kiran	Amber; Kiran	Gary; Faye	Sandrea; Shirley	Diana; Rebecca	Stef; Tasha^{1}	Red Carded (Day 12)			
Sandrea Shirley	Ali; Bev	Ali; Bev	Ali; Bev	Gary; Faye	Jaime; Steven	Stef; Tash	Amber; Kiran	Gary; Faye	Gary; Faye	Diana; Rebecca	Red Carded (Day 10)					
Gary Faye	Stef; Tasha	Jamie; Steven	Stef; Tash	Sandrea; Shirley	Cliff; Tom	Diana; Rebecca	Amber; Kiran	Jaime; Steven	Sandrea; Shirley	Red Carded (Day 9)						
Kiran Amber	Not on coach				Jamie; Steven	Gary; Faye	Jamie; Steven	Stef; Tash	Red Carded (Day 8)							
Ali Bev	Cliff; Tom	Sandrea; Shirley	Diana; Rebecca	Red Carded (Day 3)												
Walked	None															
Voted Off	Stef; Tash; 3 votes	Ali; Bev; 4 votes	Ali; Bev; 5 votes	Gary; Faye; 4 votes	Sandrea; Shirley; 3 votes	None	Amber; Kiran; 6 votes	Amber; Kiran; 2 votes	Gary; Faye; 4 votes	Sandrea; Shirley; 2 votes	None	Jamie; Steven; 3 votes	Karen; Sarah; 3 votes	Dot; Geoff; 3 votes	None	

^1 Due to Diana and Rebecca winning immunity, at vote time the couple who received the most votes would get an immediate red card which resulted in Steven & Jamie receiving the red card.

== The trip by day ==
=== Arrival Day and Day 1 Trondheim ===
Location: Trondheim
Morning Activity: Christmas Tree construction & Christmas decorating
Afternoon Activity: Figure skating

=== Day 2 ===
Location: Hell Itself
Morning Activity: Icelandic pony ride
Afternoon Activity: Strongman Contest

=== Day 3 ===
Location: Åre
Morning Activity: Zip-wiring
Afternoon Activity: Moose meat tasting

=== Day 4 ===
Location: Ostersund
Morning Activity: Viking activities
Afternoon Activity: Christmas wreath making

=== Day 5 ===
Location: Sollefteå
Morning Activity: Sauna
Afternoon Activity: Chocolate Brownies

=== Day 6 ===
Location: Ornskoldsvik
Morning Activity: Canoeing
Afternoon Activity: Ice hockey

=== Day 7 ===
Location: Umeå
Morning Activity: Culinary delights
Afternoon Activity: Christmas bauble making

=== Day 8 ===
Location: Skellefteå
Morning Activity: Pantomime training
Afternoon Activity: Curling

=== Day 9 ===
Location: Luleå
Morning Activity: Abseilling
Afternoon Activity: Tai Chi

=== Day 10 ===
Location: Lapland Part 1
Morning Activity: White-water rafting
Afternoon Activity: Massage Lesson

=== Day 11 ===
Location: Lapland Part 2
Morning Activity: Elf training
Afternoon Activity: Santa Meeting

=== Day 12 ===
Location: Rovaniemi
Morning Activity: Bowling
Afternoon Activity: Ginger Bread House decorating

=== Day 13 ===
Location: The Arctic Circle Part 1
Morning Activity: Frisbee golf
Afternoon Activity: Amethyst mine tour

=== Day 14 ===
Location: The Arctic Circle Part 2
Morning Activity: Husky racing
Afternoon Activity:

=== Day 15 and The Last Day ===
Location: Inari
Morning Activity: Reindeer farm
Afternoon Activity: Felt-making craft lesson
