= Brendan's Magical Mystery Tour =

- Genre: Reality
- Created by: Josephine Brassey; Liz Gaskell; Matt Walton
- Starring: Brendan Sheerin
- Narrated by: Tupele Dorgu
- Country of origin: United Kingdom
- Original language: English
- No. of series: 1
- No. of episodes: 20

Production
- Running time: 30 minutes (inc. adverts)
- Production company: 12 Yard

Original release
- Network: Channel 4
- Release: 24 June – 19 July 2013

Related
- Coach Trip; Brendan's Love Cruise

Brendan's Magical Mystery Tour is a reality game show broadcast since 24 June 2013 on Channel 4. The show is a spin-off from the popular Coach Trip, which also stars tour guide Brendan Sheerin.

The show sends four sets of eight strangers from the United Kingdom off to different countries around Europe and North America where they must compete in daily challenges in order to be upgraded to luxury or downgraded to no-star, super-cheap accommodation.

== Contestants ==
Week 1		Week 2		Week 3		Week 4	
Contestants	From	Contestants	From	Contestants	From	Contestants	From
Cherie	Surrey	Bethany	Manchester	Alisha	—N/a	Belinda	—N/a
Diarmuid	London	Craig	Luton	Gail	—N/a	Caroline	Lancashire
Lizzie	Maidenhead	Joe	Birmingham	Gareth	—N/a	Christine	—N/a
Lois	Bedfordshire	Lynette	Leicestershire	John	Sunderland	David	Loughborough
Matt	Merseyside	Paul	Wigan	Liz	—N/a	Kevin	Redditch
Ninette	Wolverhampton	Rachael	East Yorkshire	Mark	Midlands	Luke	Lea, Lancashire
Simon	Ellesmere Port	Sam	Hertfordshire	Mel	—N/a	Lyn	Oxfordshire
Vanda	Wales	Yo	Brixton	Ricky	—N/a	Sam	Buckinghamshire

== Week 1 - Barcelona ==
Episodes one to five saw eight strangers from different parts of the UK travel to Barcelona where they will compete in daily challenges for the chance of being upgraded. On the last day, the worst four of the contestants are eliminated and the remaining four are split into two teams to go head-to-head. When a team has won the winners challenge, the eliminated contestants vote in secret for whom they want to win the £1,000 cash prize. This week aired between 24 June to 28 June 2013.

=== Barcelona results ===
Neither won or lost in the challenge, so returned to the standard hotel.
Upgraded to luxury accommodation.
Downgraded to minimal accommodation.

Contestants	Day 1	Day 2	Day 3	Day 4	Day 5
Diarmuid	Hotel	Hotel	Hotel	Upgraded	Winner
Lois	Downgraded	Upgraded	Upgraded	Hotel	2nd
Cherie	Upgraded	Hotel	Downgraded	Hotel	3rd
Matt	Hotel	Hotel	Upgraded	Downgraded	3rd
Lizzie	Upgraded	Downgraded	Hotel	Hotel	4th
Ninette	Downgraded	Downgraded	Downgraded	Upgraded	4th
Simon	Hotel	Upgraded	Hotel	Hotel	4th
Vanda	Hotel	Hotel	Hotel	Downgraded	4th

=== Day 1 ===
Group Challenge	Catalan dancing
Teams	Cherie, Lizzie, Matt, Vanda
Teams	Diarmuid, Lois, Ninette, Simon
Upgrade Challenge	Catalan garment
Teams	Cherie & Lizzie
Teams	Matt & Vanda
Downgrade Challenge	Shoe shining
Teams	Diarmuid & Simon
Teams	Lois & Ninette

=== Day 2 ===
Group Challenge	Shopping spree
Teams	Cherie, Lois, Matt, Simon
Teams	Diarmuid, Lizzie, Ninette, Vanda
Upgrade Challenge	Paella-cooking class
Teams	Lois & Simon
Teams	Cherie & Matt
Downgrade Challenge	Table laying
Teams	Lizzie & Ninette
Teams	Diarmuid & Vanda

=== Day 3 ===
Group Challenge	Gaudi treasure hunt
Teams	Diarmuid, Lizzie, Lois, Matt
Teams	Cherie, Ninette, Simon, Vanda
Upgrade Challenge	Cava tasting
Teams	Diarmuid & Lizzie
Teams	Lois & Matt
Downgrade Challenge	Vineyard weeding
Teams	Cherie & Ninette
Teams	Simon & Vanda

=== Day 4 ===
Group Challenge	Telenovela acting
Teams	Cherie, Diarmuid, Lois, Ninette
Teams	Lizzie, Matt, Simon, Vanda
Upgrade Challenge	Pottery lesson
Teams	Diarmuid & Ninette
Teams	Cherie & Lois
Downgrade Challenge	Recycling clay
Teams	Matt & Vanda
Teams	Lizzie & Simon

=== Day 5 ===
Group Challenge	Street performing
Teams	Cherie & Matt
Teams	Diarmuid & Lois
Winners Challenge	Open-top bus tour
Contestants	Diarmuid
Contestants	Lois

== Week 2 - Jamaica ==
Episodes six to ten saw eight strangers from different parts of the UK travel to Jamaica where they will compete in daily challenges for the chance of being upgraded. On the last day, the worst four of the contestants are eliminated and the remaining four are split into two teams to go head-to-head. When a team has won the winners challenge, the eliminated contestants vote in secret for whom they want to win the £1,000 cash prize. This week aired between 1 July to 5 July 2013.

=== Jamaica results ===
Neither won or lost in the challenge, so returned to the standard hotel.
Upgraded to luxury accommodation.
Downgraded to minimal accommodation.

Contestants	Day 1	Day 2	Day 3	Day 4	Day 5
Paul	Upgraded	Upgraded	Upgraded	Downgraded	Winner
Joe	Hotel	Hotel	Hotel	Upgraded	2nd
Sam	Hotel	Upgraded	Hotel	Upgraded	3rd
Yo	Downgraded	Hotel	Hotel	Hotel	3rd
Bethany	Hotel	Hotel	Downgraded	Hotel	4th
Craig	Hotel	Downgraded	Downgraded	Downgraded	4th
Lynette	Upgraded	Downgraded	Hotel	Hotel	4th
Rachael	Downgraded	Hotel	Upgraded	Hotel	4th

=== Day 1 ===
Group Challenge	Jamaican dancing
Teams	Craig, Rachael, Sam, Yo
Teams	Bethany, Joe, Lynette, Paul
Upgrade Challenge	Curried goat cooking
Teams	Lynette & Paul
Teams	Bethany & Joe
Downgrade Challenge	Goat milking
Teams	Rachael & Yo
Teams	Craig & Sam

=== Day 2 ===
Group Challenge	Beach Olympics
Teams	Craig, Joe, Lynette, Rachael
Teams	Bethany, Paul, Sam, Yo
Upgrade Challenge	Bobsledding
Teams	Paul & Sam
Teams	Bethany & Yo
Downgrade Challenge	Hair braiding
Teams	Craig & Lynette
Teams	Joe & Rachael

=== Day 3 ===
Group Challenge	Playing traditional Jamaican music
Teams	Bethany, Craig, Lynette, Sam
Teams	Joe, Paul, Rachael, Yo
Upgrade Challenge	Sea fishing
Teams	Paul & Rachael
Teams	Joe & Yo
Downgrade Challenge	Chicken plucking
Teams	Bethany & Craig
Teams	Lynette & Sam

=== Day 4 ===
Group Challenge	Performance
Teams	Bethany, Craig, Paul, Rachael
Teams	Joe, Lynette, Sam, Yo
Upgrade Challenge	Fruit carving
Teams	Joe & Sam
Teams	Lynette & Yo
Downgrade Challenge	Coffee berry picking
Teams	Craig & Paul
Teams	Bethany & Rachael

=== Day 5 ===
Group Challenge	Jungle rafting race
Teams	Joe & Paul
Teams	Sam & Yo
Winners Challenge	Rapping
Contestants	Paul
Contestants	Joe

== Week 3 - Cancún ==
Episodes eleven to fifteen saw eight strangers from different parts of the UK travel to Cancún where they will compete in daily challenges for the chance of being upgraded. On the last day, the worst four of the contestants are eliminated and the remaining four are split into two teams to go head-to-head. When a team has won the winners challenge, the eliminated contestants vote in secret for whom they want to win the £1,000 cash prize. This week aired between 8 July to 12 July 2013.

=== Cancún results ===
Neither won or lost in the challenge, so returned to the standard hotel.
Upgraded to luxury accommodation.
Downgraded to minimal accommodation.

Contestants	Day 1	Day 2	Day 3	Day 4	Day 5
Alisha	Upgraded	Hotel			
Gail	Hotel	Upgraded			
Gareth	Hotel	Hotel			
John	Upgraded	Upgraded			
Liz	Hotel	Downgraded			
Mark	Downgraded	Hotel			
Mel	Downgraded	Hotel			
Ricky	Hotel	Downgraded			

=== Day 1 ===
Group Challenge	Mexican dancing
Teams	Alisha, Gail, John, Ricky
Teams	Gareth, Liz, Mark, Mel
Upgrade Challenge	Speedboat racing
Teams	Alisha & John
Teams	Ricky & Gail
Downgrade Challenge	Speedboat cleaning
Teams	Mark & Mel
Teams	Gareth & Liz

=== Day 2 ===
Group Challenge	Piñata bashing
Teams	Alisha, Liz, Mark, Ricky
Teams	Gail, Gareth, John, Mel
Upgrade Challenge	Golf putting
Teams	John & Gail
Teams	Gareth & Mel
Downgrade Challenge	Golf ball collecting
Teams	Liz & Ricky
Teams	Alisha & Mark

=== Day 3 ===
Group Challenge	Golf buggy racing
Teams	
Upgrade Challenge	Cocktail making
Teams	
Downgrade Challenge	Sunbed stacking
Teams	

=== Day 4 ===
Group Challenge	Sea kayaking
Teams	
Upgrade Challenge	Traditional cooking
Teams	
Downgrade Challenge	Fish descaling
Teams	

=== Day 5 ===
Group Challenge	Souvenir hunting
Teams	
Winners Challenge	Mexican wrestling
Contestants	

== Week 4 - Istanbul ==
Episodes sixteen to twenty saw eight strangers from different parts of the UK travel to Istanbul where they will compete in daily challenges for the chance of being upgraded. On the last day, the worst four of the contestants are eliminated and the remaining four are split into two teams to go head-to-head. When a team has won the winners challenge, the eliminated contestants vote in secret for whom they want to win the £1,000 cash prize. This week aired between 15 July to 19 July 2013.

=== Istanbul results ===
Neither won or lost in the challenge, so returned to the standard hotel.
Upgraded to luxury accommodation.
Downgraded to minimal accommodation.

Contestants	Day 1	Day 2	Day 3	Day 4	Day 5
Belinda	Hotel				
Caroline	Hotel				
Christine	Upgraded				
David	Hotel				
Kevin	Hotel				
Luke	Downgraded				
Lyn	Downgraded				
Sam	Upgraded				

=== Day 1 ===
Group Challenge	Belly dancing
Teams	Caroline, Kevin, Luke, Lyn
Teams	Belinda, Christine, David, Sam
Upgrade Challenge	Turkish delight tasting
Teams	Christine & Sam
Teams	Belinda & David
Downgrade Challenge	Sweet bagging
Teams	Luke & Lyn
Teams	Caroline & Kevin

=== Day 2 ===
Group Challenge
Teams
Upgrade Challenge
Teams
Downgrade Challenge
Teams

=== Day 3 ===
Group Challenge
Teams
Upgrade Challenge
Teams
Downgrade Challenge
Teams

=== Day 4 ===
Group Challenge	Fishing on the Bosphorous
Teams	
Upgrade Challenge	Cooking
Teams	
Downgrade Challenge	Fish gutting
Teams	

=== Day 5 ===
Group Challenge	Musical performance
Teams	
Winners Challenge	Haggling in the Grand Bazaar
Contestants	
