= Coach Trip =

British television series

- Also known as: Coach Trip: Road to...
- Genre: Reality
- Presented by: Brendan Sheerin
- Narrated by: Andy Love; David Quantick; Dave Vitty; Jackie Clune; Clara Amfo
- Country of origin: United Kingdom
- Original language: English
- No. of series: 20; 7 (Celebrity)
- No. of episodes: 640

Production
- Running time: 30–60 minutes
- Production company: 12 Yard

Original release
- Network: Channel 4
- Release: 7 March 2005 – 30 June 2006
- Release: 25 May 2009 – 9 March 2012
- Release: 27 January 2014 – 24 April 2015
- Network: E4
- Release: 25 July 2016 – 21 January 2022

Related
- Brendan's Magical Mystery Tour; Brendan's Love Cruise

Coach Trip is a British reality game show that was first aired on Channel 4 on 7 March 2005. The show's premise sees four to seven pairs of tourists undertaking a coach tour principally of continental Europe between twenty and fifty days, whilst accompanied in every episode by tour guide Brendan Sheerin. A vote takes place every evening in which each couple votes for the pair they least enjoy travelling with, and the pair with the most votes receives either a yellow or red card.

The show went on hiatus on 30 June 2006, and returned after a three-year break, from 25 May 2009 to 9 March 2012. In early 2013, the show went on hiatus again and was replaced by two new shows, Brendan's Magical Mystery Tour and Brendan's Love Cruise. However, in September 2013, Channel 4 announced that they had renewed Coach Trip for another series in 2014. On 9 April 2014, a further four series were announced following the success of the ninth series in early 2014.

The fourteenth series was the first of the relaunched Coach Trip: Road to... series, and aired on E4 from 25 July 2016 to 2 September 2016 entitled Coach Trip: Road to Ibiza, the fifteenth series aired from 16 January 2017 to 24 February 2017 with the title Coach Trip: Road to Marbs. The sixteenth series aired from 24 July 2017 to 15 September 2017 with the title Coach Trip: Road to Zante. The series was renewed for its seventeenth series in July 2017. This was titled Coach Trip: Road to Tenerife and aired from 8 January 2018 to 2 March 2018. The eighteenth and most recent series began airing on 28 January 2019 with the title Coach Trip: Road to Barcelona, reverting to 30 episodes, it ended on 8 March 2019. In February 2023, Channel 4 said the future of Coach Trip was uncertain.

The show's spin-off Celebrity Coach Trip launched in November 2010, and featured celebrity pairs embarking on the trip. The celebrity series' have been marginally shorter and have run between ten and fifteen days. Seven editions of Celebrity Coach Trip have aired in total, with the latest series concluding on 21 January 2022. Christmas and Halloween versions of the series' have also aired, with Christmas Coach Trip and Celebrity Ghost Trip in 2011 and 2021 respectively.

== Broadcast, narrators and repeats ==
Coach Trip originally aired weekdays at 4:30 pm before Deal or No Deal debuted on Channel 4 (followed by a repeat the following morning), with the second series aired at 2:55 pm instead (and then repeated between July and August 2007). Since the revived series, Coach Trip has moved to the 5:00 pm slot (in series 3, 4, 7, 9, Celebrity Coach Trip 2 & 3 and Christmas Coach Trip) and later to the 5:30 pm slot (in series 5, 6, 8, 9, 10, 11, 12, 13 and Celebrity Coach Trip 1) on Channel 4. Since the 14th series (Coach Trip: Road to Ibiza) in 2016, the show has aired on weekdays at 7:30 pm on E4.

In series 3, an omnibus edition was also shown on weekends but was cancelled part of the way through the series. It returned for series 9 on More4.

Andy Love was the narrator in the first two series, with David Quantick taking the role in both series 3 and 4. From series 5 to 8, Dave Vitty was the show's narrator; he was also the narrator for all the Celebrity and Christmas series' of Coach Trip to date. Jackie Clune was the narrator from series 9 to 13, with Clara Amfo taking over for the fourteenth series.

4seven aired repeats of series 8 onwards, More4 repeated all series, and defunct Sky Travel, Sky Mix (then known as Sky Three/Sky3/Pick TV/Pick) and defunct Sky Real Lives have all only repeated series 1 & 2 of Coach Trip along with defunct Channel 4 scheduling slot, T4 on weekend mornings. Celebrity Coach Trip began showing repeats on Travel Channel in May 2014.

=== Hiatus ===
A Channel 4 spokesperson said the broadcaster previously had no plans to commission another series. Brendan later said in June 2013, during a telephone interview to Paul about his 2 new shows, that "Coach Trip has been rested at the moment – it's not the end of the programme, but we decided that we’d experiment with two new formats".

=== Revival ===
On 4 September 2013, Channel 4 announced there would be another series of Coach Trip consisting of 30 episodes, each 30 minutes long. Sheerin and Donald both returned to the show. Applications for the new series opened on the same day. On 9 April 2014, it was confirmed by Digital Spy that the show would return for a further four series (80 episodes in total).

On 6 April 2016, it was announced that Coach Trip will return for a fourteenth series in 2016 on E4. This series was called Coach Trip: Road to Ibiza and it began airing on 25 July 2016. On 23 August 2016, Channel 4 confirmed that Coach Trip would return for series 15 & 16 in 2017. On 13 July 2017 it was announced that Coach Trip would return for series 17. It returned for an eighteenth series in January 2019.

== Format and continents ==
The show's format consists of four to seven teams of two undertaking a coach tour principally of continental Europe (but with individual series including sojourns into North Africa and Western Asia) and has been sold to other countries. The tours have usually lasted between 20 and 50 days (Celebrity series tours have lasted between 10 and 15 days and Christmas series tours have also lasted 15 days), with passengers remaining on the tour only until they are ejected by their companions via popular vote, to be replaced by a new couple the following day. The travellers are accompanied by tour guide Brendan Sheerin, who appears in every episode.

== Coaches, registration plates and drivers ==
The coaches used were originally supplied by Motts Travel, a coach hire company based in Aylesbury, Buckinghamshire, up to Series 13. From Series 14 entitled "The Road to Ibiza", the coach has been supplied by Westway Coaches, based in Raynes Park, London. The coaches are installed with cameras and microphones to record the passengers while on board. The coaches used in the show are decorated with a Union Flag design on the outside, Series 14 entitled "The Road to Ibiza" introduced a new beach design with #COACHTRIP on the coach roof.

- The first coach 'T100 MTT' was a Volvo B10M with Jonckheere Mistral 50 bodywork. It was used during Series 1 and Series 2.
- The coach 'MT04 MTT' arrived in Central London to be used for Series 3 only. It is a Volvo B12B with Plaxton Panther bodywork.
- The coach 'MT09 MTT', also a Volvo B12B/Plaxton Panther, was used between Series 4 and 13.
- The coach '29 WT', a personalised Van Hool TX series tri-axle, is used from Series 14 entitled "The Road to Ibiza" also use for other Road to ? series.

There have been four different drivers who drove each coach on each different series. In the 1st series, the driver was Chris Groombridge who only drove T100 MTT. Series 2 saw his successor, Paul Donald take over as coach driver until the 10th series. On Day 13 in Series 8, a temporary driver (Jamie) took over for the day and drove the coach to the ferry port. Series 11 saw Malcom Kimber take over as coach driver, Series 14 entitled "The Road to Ibiza" introduced George & Charles as new drivers.

== Regular series ==
Series	Premiere	Finale	Winners
1	7 March 2005	19 April 2005	Maggie & Paul
2	22 May 2006	30 June 2006	Joy & Paul
3	25 May 2009	3 July 2009	Hannah & Katie
4	15 February 2010	23 April 2010	Ann & Graham
5	30 August 2010	8 October 2010	Chris & Maggie
6	14 February 2011	25 March 2011	Rob & Timmy
7	29 August 2011	7 October 2011	Katie & Nathan
8	30 January 2012	9 March 2012	Craig & Stuart
9	27 January 2014	8 March 2014	Annabelle & Emily
10	27 October 2014	21 November 2014	Cherelle & Dino; Bill & Carol
11	24 November 2014	19 December 2014	Corene & Grace
12	2 March 2015	27 March 2015	Joe & Nikki
13	30 March 2015	24 April 2015	Jordan & Micky
14	25 July 2016	2 September 2016	Holmest & Lauryn
15	16 January 2017	24 February 2017	Bradley & Kevin
16	24 July 2017	15 September 2017	Jack & Joe
17	8 January 2018	2 March 2018	Ali & Jon
18	28 January 2019	8 March 2019	Andy & James

=== Series 1 (2005) ===
Coach Trip 1 was the first series of Coach Trip in the United Kingdom. Filming started in April 2004 and lasted until June 2004, the series began airing on 7 March 2005 and concluded on 19 April 2005. The trip went through several European countries. Chris Groombridge was the driver for the only time, Brendan Sheerin was the tour guide, Andy Love was narrator and the registration was T100 MTT.

=== Series 2 (2006) ===
Coach Trip 2 was the second series of Coach Trip in the United Kingdom. Filming started in May 2005 and lasted until July 2005, the series began airing on 22 May 2006 and concluded on 30 June 2006. The show's format had the same idents as series 1. This year, the trip was centred on Mediterranean countries. Brendan returned as the tour guide, the narrator was once again Andy Love and the registration number plate once again was T100 MTT. Paul Donald was the driver for the first time.

=== Series 3 (2009) ===
Coach Trip 3 was the third series of Coach Trip in the United Kingdom. Filming started in September 2008 and lasted until October 2008, the series began airing on 25 May 2009 and concluded on 3 July 2009. The show's format after a break of 3 years remained unchanged from the previous series but the titles were new along with the timeslot: seven couples travelling around Europe on a coach like series 1 for 30 days attempting vote off the least popular couples. With visits to Croatia, the Czech Republic, Hungary, Liechtenstein and Luxembourg for the first time. Tour guide Brendan Sheerin and coach driver Paul Donald both returned for this series, which aired on Channel 4 with a similar start to series 1 and a similar end to series 2. David Quantick was the narrator and MT04 MTT was the registration number plate for the first and only time.

=== Series 4 (February to April 2010) ===
Coach Trip 4 was the fourth series of Coach Trip in the United Kingdom. Filming started on 7 September 2009 and lasted until 27 October 2009, the series began airing on 15 February 2010 and concluded on 23 April 2010. The length of this series was longer than the previous instalments, increased from 30 days to 50 days for a tour centred on European, Mediterranean, North African and West Asian countries on a coach like series 1, 2 and 3 attempting to vote off the least popular couples. Tour guide Brendan Sheerin, coach driver Paul Donald and narrator David Quantick all returned for this series, which aired on Channel 4. MT09 MTT was the coach registration number plate.

=== Series 5 (August to October 2010) ===
Coach Trip 5 was the fifth series of Coach Trip in the United Kingdom. Filming started in May 2010 and lasted until June 2010, the series began airing on 30 August 2010 and concluded on 8 October 2010. The show's format changed slightly from previous series and with weekends included, from Day 2 of that the couple who received a yellow card the previous day would be immune from the following vote the next day. The series involves seven couples traveling on a one-month tour centering on Northern European countries for the first time, with visits to Denmark, Finland, Sweden, Norway, Lithuania, Latvia and Estonia. Tour guide Brendan Sheerin, coach driver Paul Donald and the MT09 MTT registration all returned for this series, which airs on Channel 4. David Vitty was the narrator for the first time and the airing time moved from 5:00 pm to 5:30 pm.

=== Series 6 (February to March 2011) ===
Coach Trip 6 was the sixth series of Coach Trip in the United Kingdom. Filming started in July 2010 and lasted until August 2010, the series began airing on 14 February 2011 and concluded on 25 March 2011. The voting system rules reverted to those of earlier series. The length of this series was the same as the previous non-celebrity series but with weekends excluded. The tour visited Mediterranean countries like series 2 but with visits to Switzerland added for a month. Tour guide Brendan Sheerin, coach driver Paul Donald, narrator Dave Vitty and the coach with registration number MT09 MTT all returned for this series, which was aired on Channel 4 with a similar start to series 2 and a similar end to series 4.

=== Series 7 (August to October 2011) ===
Coach Trip 7 was the seventh series of Coach Trip in the United Kingdom. Filming started in May 2011 and lasted until June 2011, the series began airing on 29 August 2011 and concluded on 7 October 2011. The length of this series was the same as the previous non-celebrity series but still with weekends excluded. The European tour began in the UK, before moving to France, Germany, Switzerland, Liechtenstein, Austria, Hungary, the Czech Republic plus for the first time ever, Poland and Slovakia. Tour guide Brendan Sheerin, coach driver Paul Donald, narrator Dave Vitty and the coach with registration number MT09 MTT all returned for this series, which was aired on Channel 4 with the airing time reverted to 5:00 pm, with a similar start to series 1 and a similar end to series 3.

=== Series 8 (2012) ===
Coach Trip 8 was the eighth and final series of Coach Trip in the United Kingdom, before the 2012 Summer Olympics and Paralympics. Filming started on 29 August 2011 and lasted until 1 October 2011, the series began airing on 30 January 2012, after the third celebrity series concluded, concluding on 9 March 2012. The length of this series was the same as the previous non-celebrity series but with only one day of a weekend included at the end of the tour. The Mediterranean tour centring towards Western Asia began in the UK, before moving to Germany, Austria, Italy, the Netherlands, Greece, Bulgaria, Turkey, and for the first time Macedonia. Tour guide Brendan Sheerin, coach driver Paul Donald, narrator Dave Vitty and the coach with registration number MT09 MTT all returned for the series with a similar start to series 3 and a similar end to series 4, which was aired weekdays on Channel 4 and the airing time again moved to 5:30 pm.

=== Series 9 (January to March 2014) ===
Coach Trip 9 was the ninth series of Coach Trip in the United Kingdom, following the broadcaster's decision to renew the show. Filming started in September 2013 and lasted until October 2013, the series began airing on 27 January 2014 and concluded on 8 March 2014. The ninth series saw Brendan Sheerin return as tour guide, as in all previous editions and Paul Donald continue as coach driver and MT09 MTT was the registration of the coach once again. The tour had a similar start to series 1 and 3 and includes visits to Sardinia for the first time. The series aired on weekdays at 5:30 pm from episodes 1 to 15, however was moved to 5:00 pm from episodes 16 to 29 due to Superstar Dogs: Countdown to Crufts. Due to the 2014 Winter Paralympics opening ceremony on Channel 4, episode 30 was instead aired on More4 at 12:10 pm on 8 March 2014.

=== Series 10 (October to November 2014) ===
Coach Trip 10 was the tenth series of Coach Trip in the United Kingdom. Filming took place between July and August 2014. The series began airing on 27 October 2014 for 20 episodes, concluding on 21 November 2014.

=== Series 11 (November to December 2014) ===
Coach Trip 11 was the eleventh series of Coach Trip in the United Kingdom. Filming took place between September and October 2014, The series began airing on 24 November 2014 for 20 episodes, 3 days after the tenth series concluded, concluding on 19 December 2014.

=== Series 12 (March 2015) ===
Coach Trip 12 was the twelfth series of Coach Trip in the United Kingdom. Filming took place in November 2014, The series began airing on 2 March 2015 for 20 episodes, concluding on 27 March 2015.

=== Series 13 (March to April 2015) ===
Coach Trip 13 was the thirteenth and final series of Coach Trip. Filming took place between November and December 2014, The series began airing on 30 March 2015 for 20 episodes, 3 days after the twelfth series concluded, concluding on 24 April 2015. These were the last 20 episodes of the original 80 that were commissioned in April 2014.

=== Series 14: "Road to Ibiza" (2016) ===
Coach Trip returned for its fourteenth series, consisting of 30 episodes, on 25 July 2016 moving from Channel 4 to E4, Filming took place between May and July 2015 and the series is known as Coach Trip: Road to Ibiza. On the last day of the coach trip, the five remaining couples voted for the couple that they want to win the luxury holiday in Ibiza and the £1,000 prize.

The Voting system on this series was:

Days 1 to 26 was a yellow card
Days 27 to 29 an automatic red card due to all couples canvassing for future votes before the vote on day 24

Similar system to Celebrity Coach Trip.

=== Series 15: "Road to Marbs" (January to February 2017) ===
Coach Trip series 15 was confirmed by Channel 4 on 23 August 2016. Filming of series 15 took place between October and November 2016 (before Deal or No Deal on Channel 4 ended). It began airing on 16 January 2017, consisting of 30 episodes, this time round with title Coach Trip: Road to Marbs. On the last day of the coach trip the five remaining couples voted for the couple that they want to win the luxury holiday in Marbella and the £1,000 prize.

On Day 21, partners, Bradley & Kevin, got engaged during the flying activity. This is the first time a couple has engaged on Coach Trip. The pair went on to win the series.

=== Series 16: "Road to Zante" (July to September 2017) ===
Coach Trip series 16 was confirmed by E4 on 14 December 2016. Filming took place between 14 May and 12 June 2017. This is a new format, as it consisted of 40 episodes and followed the "Road to..." format. The sixteenth series has the title Coach Trip: Road to Zante.

=== Series 17: "Road to Tenerife" (2018) ===
It was confirmed on 13 July 2017 that Coach Trip was renewed for series 17. Filming took place between 1 September 2017 and 22 October 2017. The series consisted of 40 episodes and followed the "Road to..." format. The seventeenth series has the title Coach Trip: Road to Tenerife and aired from 8 January 2018 to 2 March 2018.

=== Series 18: "Road to Barcelona" (2019) ===
The eighteenth series of Coach Trip was confirmed by Channel 4 and again followed the Road to... format. The filming took place between 6 May and 8 July 2018. The series reverted to 30 episodes, aired from 28 January 2019 to 8 March 2019 and has the title Coach Trip: Road to Barcelona.

The Voting system on this series was the same as Road to Ibiza:

Days 1 to 26 was a yellow card
Days 27 to 29 an automatic red card due to all couples canvassing for future votes before the vote on day 25

Similar system to Celebrity Coach Trip.

== Celebrity series ==
Series	Premiere	Finale	Winners
1	8 November 2010	19 November 2010	Barry & Paul Elliott
2	10 October 2011	21 October 2011	Gary Cockerill & Phil Turner
3	16 January 2012	27 January 2012	Derek Martin & John Altman
4	14 January 2019	25 January 2019	Lisa Maffia & Mutya Buena
5	7 October 2019	18 October 2019	Francis Boulle & Sarah Keyworth
6	6 January 2020	24 January 2020	Adele Roberts & Kate Holderness
7	3 January 2022	21 January 2022	Lesley Joseph & Linda Robson

=== Series 1 (2010) ===
Celebrity Coach Trip 1 is the first series of Celebrity Coach Trip which was filmed from 6 to 20 September 2010 and began airing on 8 November 2010. The series featured a variety of celebrity couples on a 10-day tour, the couples get to vote off the other couples that they do not get along with. On the last day of the coach trip, the remaining couples vote for the couple that they want to win the £1,000 prize for charity. The first day of the coach trip started in Prague and the last day of the trip ended in Venice. Tour guide Brendan Sheerin, narrator David Vitty, coach driver Paul Donald and the MT09 MTT registration all returned for this series, which aired on Channel 4.

The Voting system on this series was:

Days 1 to 4 was a yellow card
Days 5 to 9 an automatic red card

=== Series 2 (2011) ===
Celebrity Coach Trip 2 was the second celebrity series of Coach Trip which aired from 10 to 21 October 2011. The series featured a variety of celebrity couples on a 10-day tour, the couples get to vote off the other couples that they do not get along with. Filming took place from 9 to 23 April 2011. On the last day of the coach trip the remaining couples vote for the couple that they want to win the £1,000 prize for charity. This coach trip had a journey around the Mediterranean, with the starting location and pick up point in South Paris, France, and the first destination was Monaco.

The Voting system on this series was:

Days 1 to 5 was a yellow card
Days 6 to 9 an automatic red card

=== Series 3 (2012) ===
Celebrity Coach Trip 3 was the third and final celebrity series of Coach Trip which aired from 16 to 27 January 2012 before series 8 started airing. Filming took place from 4 to 18 July 2011. On the last day of the coach trip, the remaining couples vote for the couple that they want to win the £1,000 prize for charity. This coach trip had another journey around the Mediterranean, with the starting location and pick up point in Trieste, Italy, and the first destination was Ljubljana, Slovenia.

The Voting system on this series was:

Days 1 to 6 was a yellow card
Days 7 to 9 an automatic red card

=== Series 4: "Road to Benidorm" (January 2019) ===
In 2018, it was announced that Celebrity Coach Trip would return for a fourth series after a seven-year hiatus. Celebrity Coach Trip 4 has the title Celebrity Coach Trip: Road to Benidorm and will air from 14 to 25 January 2019.

The Voting system on this series was:

Days 1 to 6 was a yellow card
Days 7 to 9 an automatic red card

=== Series 5 (October 2019) ===
In 2019, it was announced that Celebrity Coach Trip would return for a fifth series. Celebrity Coach Trip 5 began airing on 7 October 2019. and was won by Francis Boulle and Sarah Keyworth.

The Voting system on this series was:

Days 1 to 4 was a yellow card
Days 5 to 9 an automatic red card

=== Series 6 (2020) ===
Celebrity Coach Trip 6 began broadcasting on 6 January 2020. This series ran for 15 days instead of the usual 10 and was won by Adele Roberts and Kate Holderness.

The Voting system on this series was:

Days 1 to 13 was a yellow card
Day 14 was an automatic red card

=== Series 7 (2022) ===
Celebrity Coach Trip 7 began broadcasting on 3 January 2022 and concluded on 21 January 2022. It was won by Birds of a Feather actresses Lesley Joseph and Linda Robson.

== Christmas Coach Trip (2011) ==
Series	Premiere	Finale	Winners
1	12 December 2011	30 December 2011	Diana & Rebecca

Christmas Coach Trip was a Christmas-themed version of Coach Trip. It began airing on the same day that filming finished. The trip started from Trondheim Airport, Værnes, followed by Trondheim, Norway and the final destination was Inari, Finland. The tourists arrived back in Great Britain via Kirkenes Airport, Høybuktmoen and the filming took place from 28 November to 12 December 2011.

== Celebrity Ghost Trip (2021) ==
Series	Premiere	Finale	Winners
1	24 October 2021	28 October 2021	Kerry Katona & Lilly-Sue McFadden

Celebrity Ghost Trip began airing on 24 October 2021. It was announced that the series would return after a two-year hiatus due to the COVID-19 pandemic. This series was titled Celebrity Ghost Trip as instead of the usual trip around Europe, they instead toured spooky locations around the United Kingdom. Filming began in September 2021 and the show will return in the Autumn.

== List of activities ==
On each series of Coach Trip there are different activities each day for the tourists and celebrities to do and/or have already done by order of appearance. Below is a (near complete) list of activities that have featured on Coach Trip to date.

A–D
Activity	Series (so far)
Accordion lesson	C1
Aerial silk dancing	13
Aerobic lesson	12
Aikido	9
Amusement parks	2–8
Amusement park quizzes	6
Alpine horn lesson	6
Aquarium visiting	1, 2, 5 & 6
AquaSpheres	C1
Archery	2, 4, 6 & 9
Banana boating	13
Ballet lesson	13 & C1
Balloon riding	9
Basque pelota	6
Beach volleyball	8 & 9
Beekeeping	2, 4 &
Beer bathing	C1
Beer Bottling	13
Beer tasting	10, 12 & 13
Belly dancing	2, 4, 6, 8 & C1
Bicycle tour	13
Bossaball	10
Boules	6
Bowling	10
Boat tour	10
Break dancing lesson	10
Bridge building	8
Buggy driving	6, 8 & 14
Bungee jumping	4, 5, 8 & 9
Cabaret lesson	10
Canoeing	4, 5, 11 & C1
Capella singing	12
Caricature drawing/sculpting lesson	10 & 12
Cathedral visiting	1, 3, 4, 6 & C1
Cavern visiting	1, 3, 4, 6, 7 & 9
Champagne tasting	7 & 9
Chip shop catering	10
Chocolate bathing	10
Chocolate tasting	13
Christmas tree construction	Xmas
Cider tasting	6
Circus training	9
Clay pigeon shooting	13
Coach quizzes (mornings only)	All series
Coffee Tasting	10
Cocktail making	4, 8, 9 & 12
Contact improvisation	13
Cricket	6
Crossbow making	3
Cruising	1 & C1
Curling	4, 11 & Xmas
Cycling	3 & 6
Deep sea fishing	13
DJ mixing & rapping	2 & 5
Dolphin watching	5, 6 & 9
Dry slope activities	6

E–H
Activity	Series (so far)
Eel tasting	3 & 12
Eel catching	12
Factory visiting	1–4, 7, 9, 13 & Xmas
Fashion shows	2, 4 & 5
Fencing	10
Fire water tasting	2
Fish & chip making	10
Fishing	4–6, 8 & 9
Flamenco dancing	6 & 9
Flower arranging	12
Folk dancing	11, 12 & 13
Football	2 & 6
Fortress tour	12
Frisbee golf	11
Ghost tour	11
Giant foosball	9
Gingerbread making	11
Glass blowing lesson	11
Gliding trip	11
Goat milking	10
Go-karting	10
Golf	2, 4–6, 8 & 9
Gondola riding	1, 3 & C1
Grape crushing	13
Grass skiing	7 & 13
Hammam	10
Handball	5 & 6
Harmonica lesson	11
History lesson	10
Horse photography class	10
Horse riding	2–6
Hunting	5 & 6
Husky ride/racing	11 & Xmas

I–M
Activity	Series (so far)
Ice hockey	5, 10 & Xmas
Indoor skiing	8
Jet skiing	2, 9 & 12
Kangoo tour	10
Kayaking	3, 6, 9 & 12
Killer whale watching	9
Kite flying	8 & 9
Knight school	13
Lake diving	2, 3, 6 & Xmas
Language lesson	1, 2, 6–10, 12 & 13
Life drawing class	11
Llama walking	8
Lollipop making	10
Majorette lesson	13
Marzipan making lesson	11
Mask making	1 & C1
Massage lesson	13
Maypole dancing	5 & 9
Medieval activities	4–6 & 13
Morris dancing	6
Mosaic making	3
Motor racing	2, 4, 5 & 9
Mountain visiting	3–5
Museum visiting	1–6, 9, 11, 13 & C1

N–Q
Activity	Series (so far)
Nordic walking	1
Octopus curling	12
Oil wrestling	4 & 8
Olive tree milking	12
Ossuary	13
Opera lesson	2, 6, 10, 14 & C1
Oyster tasting	6
Paddle boarding lesson	12
Painting lesson	1, 3, 5, 6, 9 & 12
Pantomime training	Xmas
Parasailing	6
Parrot watching	2
Percussion lesson	12
Perfume smelling	2, 6 & 7
Pie making	12
Pizza making	1, 3, 6, 9, 12 & 14
Photo challenge	12
Poetry lesson	11
Pottery lesson	2, 4, 6, 8, 9 & 11
Puppetry	13 & C1
Quad biking	4, 6 & 9

R–T
Activity	Series (so far)
Rock climbing	12
Rounders/baseball	8
Royal Palace tour	11
Rugby	2 & 6
Sack fighting	12
Sailing	2, 6, 8 & 12
Sandcastle making	13
Sausage making	5, 9 & C1
Scat singing	11
Scuba diving	9 & 11
Segways	3–5, 8, 9, C1 & C2
Sherry tasting	2
Skeet shooting	3 & 4
Sky diving	5, 7 & 8
Souvenir shopping	1–3 & 6–8
Spas	2–4, 6, 8, 12 & Xmas
Snorkeling	12
Stilt walking	6
Summer bobsledging	3, 5 & C1
Summer tobogganing	7, 10, 13 & C3
Surfing	4 & 6
Swamp hiking	10
Sweet making	12
Swimming baths	1–3, 5 & 6
Swimming with dolphins	8 & 9
Swimming bath diving	9
Tai chi	10
Tank riding	4 & C1
Tree top rope course	11 & 12
Tripe making	6

U–Z
Activity	Series (so far)
Urban art lesson	10
Viennese Waltz Lesson	13
Viking activities	11 & Xmas
Wakeboarding	6
Water parks	2, 5 & 6
Water polo	13
Waterskiing	2, 4 & 9
Whale watching	11
Wife carrying	11
Wine tasting	1, 2, 8, 12 & 14
Wood carving	5 & 8
Wrestling	11 & 12
Yodeling	3 & 13
Yoga	2, 6, 9, 12, C2 & C3
Zipwiring	4, 5, 9 & Xmas
Zoo visiting	1, 2, 4, 8, 10 & C1
Zorbing	5 & 8

== Records ==
Regular series
Record	Record holder	Record information	Series
Longest stays on the coach on a 20-day series	Will & Craig (10); Grace & Coreene (11); Jack & Adam (11); Ruth & Andy (12); Carly & Charlie (12)	Entered coach on Day 1, lasted entirety of series (Day 20)	10, 11 and 12
Longest stays on the coach on a 30-day series	Glenn & Becca (5); Amanda & Nicki (5); Terry & Hilary (6); Rob & Timmy (6); Alison & Ashley (7); Ollie & Leah (8); Emily & Annabelle (9); Darren & James (9); Faye & Holly (15)	Entered coach on Day 1, All couples lasted entirety of series (Day 30)	5, 6, 7, 8, 9 and 15
Longest stays on the coach on a 50-day series	Paul & Matt	Entered coach on Day 1, Yellow-carded on Day 26 and red-carded on Day 33	4
Shortest stays on the coach on a 20-day series	Nim & Graham	Entered on Day 10, walked a day later due to injury	13
Shortest stays on the coach on a 30-day series	Laura & Mark (7); Carol & Bill (9)	Entered coach on Day 1 and red-carded off the trip with 4 votes later that day, lasted 12 hours in total. Entered coach after lunch on Day 8 and left on the start Day 9 due to Carol falling ill. They lasted 5 hours, becoming another couple to have the shortest stay. The only difference was in series 7 the voting system started with receiving an automatic red card on the first day where as if you got a red card with the most votes you could be sent home without departing the British isles. Other series all started with receiving a yellow card and when you have ill health you will be withdrawn from travelling.	7 and 9
Shortest stays on the coach on a 50-day series	Bruce & Jon	Joined on Day 11 and red-carded off the trip a day later for fighting with Tam and Jayson	4
Longest time couples spent on a 20-day series after receiving a yellow card	Carly & Charlie	Lasted the entirety of the series as originals after receiving a yellow-card on Day 10	12
Longest time couples spent on a 30-day series after receiving a yellow card	Amanda & Nicki (5); Alison & Ashley (7)	Both couples lasted the entirety of the series as originals after receiving a yellow-card on Day 2. The only difference was in Series 5 is they had a different voting system where as if you got the majority of the votes then you became immune from being voted for the following day. Series 1 to 3, 4 (which was a 50-day series) and 6 to 9 all didn't have this voting system in place.	5 and 7
Longest time couples spent on a 50-day series after receiving a yellow card	Vin & Lin	Joined on Day 22, Yellow-carded on Day 23 and red-carded on Day 37, making 2 weeks (15 days)	4
Shortest time couples spent on a 20-day series after receiving a yellow card	Bradley & Ottavio	All couples were yellow-carded without being voted for at the start of Day 16 due to chaos at the hotel. Bradley and Ottavio were red-carded later at the vote.	10

Celebrity series
Record	Record holder	Record information	Series
Longest stays on the coach	Ricky & Alex; Carol & Ingrid; Paul & Barry; Brian & Spencer; Phil & Gary; Derek & John; Bobby & Tommy; Charlotte & Josh; James & Ola; Lisa & Mutya	Entered coach on Day 1, all couples lasted entirety of series (Day 10)	1, 2, 3 and 4
Shortest stays on the coach	David & Tony; Rodney & Cheryl; Bruce & Scott; Alison & Sharon; Pat & Mike; Big Narstie & Stevo	All couples lasted 1 day. David & Tony joined after lunch on Day 6 and red-carded off the trip with 5 votes a day later. Rodney & Cheryl joined after lunch on Day 7 and red-carded off the trip with 4 votes a day later. Bruce & Scott joined after lunch on Day 6 and red-carded off the trip with 4 votes a day later. Alison & Sharon joined after lunch on Day 8 and red-carded off the trip with 3 votes a day later. Pat & Mike joined on Day 9 and lasted till final day. Big Narstie & Stevo joined on Day 9 and lasted till the final day.	1, 3 and 4
Longest time couples spent after receiving a yellow card	Lisa & Mutya	Lasted entirety of the series. Original 5, Yellow-carded on Day 1 and lasted till final day, making the whole 10 days of the series.	4

Christmas series
Record	Record holder	Record information	Series
Longest stays on the coach	Diane & Rebecca; Cliff & Tom; Stef & Tash	Entered coach on Day 1, all couples lasted entirety of series (Day 15).	1
Shortest stays on the coach	Ali & Bev; Geoff & Dot	Both couples lasted 2 days. Ali & Bev entered coach on Day 1 and red-carded off the trip with 5 votes 2 days later. Geoff & Dot joined on Day 13 and lasted till final day	1
Longest time couples spent after receiving a yellow card	Stef & Tash	Lasted entirety of the series. Original 7, Yellow-carded on Day 1 and lasted till final day, making the whole 15 days of the series	1

Road to... sub-series
Record	Record holder	Record information	Series
Longest stays on the coach (30 day series)	Faye & Holly (M)	Entered coach on Day 1, lasted entirety of series (Day 30)	Marbs
Longest stay on the coach by a solo traveller paired couple (30 day series)	Andy & Dan (I)	Entered coach on Day 14, lasted entirety of series (Day 30)	Ibiza
Shortest stays on the coach (30 day series)	Amber & George (I); Gina & Lisa (I); Ellie & Kat (I); Charlotte & Laura (I); Amber & Bex (M)	All couples lasted 3 days	Ibiza and Marbs
Longest time couples spent after receiving a yellow card (30 day series)	Alex & Rochelle (I); Jake & Sophie (M)	Both couples were Yellow-carded on Day 12 and lasted till final day, making 19 days of the series (Day 30)	Ibiza and Marbs
Longest stays on the coach (40 day series)	Jack & Joe (Z)	Entered coach on Day 21, lasted entirety of series (Day 40)	Zante
Longest stay on the coach by a solo traveller paired couple (40 day series)	Chantal (Z)	Chantal entered the coach on Day 1 with Hollye and was Yellow-carded on Day 8, Hollye left the coach on Day 12. On Day 13 Chantal was paired with fellow solo-traveller Jacob, they were Yellow-carded on Day 25 and red-carded on Day 27.	Zante
Shortest stays on the coach (40 day series)	Chloe & Samirah (T)	Joined and left the coach on Day 1	Tenerife
Longest time couples spent after receiving a yellow card (40 day series)	Shaquirah & Winnie (Z)	Yellow-carded on Day 28 and lasted till final day, making 13 days of the series (Day 40)	Zante

== List of countries visited ==
=== Europe ===
- Andorra
- Austria
- Kingdom of Belgium
- Bulgaria
- Corsica (Part of France (Second celebrity series only))
- Croatia
- Czech Republic
- Denmark
- Estonia (Fifth regular series only)
- Republic of Finland
- France
- Germany
- Gibraltar (British Overseas Territory (Second regular series only))
- United Kingdom of Great Britain & Northern Ireland
- Greece
- Hungary
- Ibiza (Part of Spain)
- Italy
- Latvia
- Liechtenstein
- Lithuania
- Luxembourg
- Malta (Fourth regular series only)
- Monaco
- Montenegro
- Kingdom of the Netherlands
- The North Macedonian Republic
- Kingdom of Norway
- Poland
- Portugal
- Sardinia (Part of Italy (Ninth regular series only))
- Sicily (Part of Italy (Fourth regular series only))
- Serbia
- Slovakia
- Slovenia
- Kingdom of Spain
- Kingdom of Sweden
- Switzerland
- Turkey

=== North Africa ===
- Morocco
- Tunisia (Fourth regular series only)

=== Western Asia ===
- Turkey

== Transmissions ==
=== Regular series ===
Series	Start date	End date	Episodes
1	7 March 2005	19 April 2005	30
2	22 May 2006	30 June 2006	30
3	25 May 2009	3 July 2009	30
4	15 February 2010	23 April 2010	50
5	30 August 2010	8 October 2010	30
6	14 February 2011	25 March 2011	30
7	29 August 2011	7 October 2011	30
8	30 January 2012	9 March 2012	30
9	27 January 2014	8 March 2014	30
10	27 October 2014	21 November 2014	20
11	24 November 2014	19 December 2014	20
12	2 March 2015	27 March 2015	20
13	30 March 2015	24 April 2015	20
14	25 July 2016	2 September 2016	30
15	16 January 2017	24 February 2017	30
16	24 July 2017	15 September 2017	40
17	8 January 2018	2 March 2018	40
18	28 January 2019	8 March 2019	30

=== Celebrity series ===
Series	Start date	End date	Episodes
1	8 November 2010	19 November 2010	10
2	10 October 2011	21 October 2011	10
3	16 January 2012	27 January 2012	10
4	14 January 2019	25 January 2019	10
5	7 October 2019	18 October 2019	10
6	6 January 2020	24 January 2020	15
7	3 January 2022	21 January 2022	15

=== Christmas Coach Trip ===
Series	Start date	End date	Episodes
1	12 December 2011	30 December 2011	15

=== Celebrity Ghost Trip ===
Series	Start date	End date	Episodes
1	24 October 2021	28 October 2021	5

== Other versions ==
Country/Region	Local title	Host	Network	Premiere/air dates
France	Le Bus (The Bus)	Frédéric Guillemin	M6	23 July – 24 August 2012
Germany	Der VIP Bus – Promis auf Pauschalreise (The VIP Bus – Celebrities on Package tour)	Olivia Jones	RTL	1 December 2013
Quebec	Les Touristes (The Tourists)	Patrick Groulx	V	17 September – 21 November 2012

== Related shows ==
On 24 June 2013, a replacement show called Brendan's Magical Mystery Tour began on Channel 4. The series was filmed from September 2012 (visiting Barcelona, Jamaica, Cancún in Mexico and Istanbul) and aired in the 5:00 pm slot, narrated by Tupele Dorgu.

On 13 September 2012, Sheerin announced in an interview that he had signed a deal to host a new dating show for Channel 4, titled 'Brendan's Love Boat'. The other replacement show (produced by Optomen) was aired in December 2013, after being commissioned for a 20-episode series. The series, renamed Brendan's Love Cruise, began on 2 December on More4 in the 9:20 am slot, narrated by Maria McErlane.
