= Coach Trip series 8 =

Coach Trip
- Series 8
- No. of days: 30
- Winners: Craig & Stuart
- Runners-up: Leah & Ollie

Release
- Original network: Channel 4
- Original release: 30 January – 9 March 2012

Additional information
- Filming dates: 29 August – 1 October 2011

Series chronology
- ← Previous; Series 7 Next → Series 9

Coach Trip 8 aired from 30 January to 9 March 2012 after the third celebrity series finished and is the eighth and final series of Coach Trip in the United Kingdom before the 2012 Summer Olympics and Paralympics. It was filmed from Monday 29 August until Saturday 1 October 2011. The length of this series was the same as the previous non-celebrity series but with only 1 day of a weekend included at the end of the tour. The Mediterranean tour centring towards Western Asia began in the UK, before moving to the Netherlands, Germany, Austria, Italy, Greece, Bulgaria, North Macedonia (for the first time) and finishing in Turkey. Tour guide Brendan Sheerin, coach driver Paul Donald, narrator Dave Vitty and the coach with registration number MT09 MTT all returned for this series, which was aired on Channel 4 with the airing time moved to 5:30 p.m. again, a similar start to series 3 and a similar end to series 4.

== Contestants ==
Couple were aboard the coach	Couple got yellow carded	Couple won a prize at the vote
Couple were immune from votes	Couple got red carded
Couple left the coach	Couple were not present at the vote

Couple	Relationship	Trip Duration (Days)																													
Couple	Relationship	1	2	3	4	5	6	7	8	9	10	11	12	13	14	15	16	17	18	19	20	21	22	23	24	25	26	27	28	29	30
Craig & Stuart (replaced Caroline & Gary)	Partners	Not on coach																												Winners on 9 March 2012	
Leah & Ollie (original 7)	Husband & wife								Yellow card																					Second on 9 March 2012	
Chez & Lou (replaced Ann & Dave)	Friends	Not on coach											Yellow card																	Third on 9 March 2012	
Claire & Donna (replaced Gill & Pat)	Friends	Not on coach																Yellow card												Third on 24 February 2017	
Charlie & Chloe (replaced Sarah & Nigel)	Sisters	Not on coach																												Fourth on 24 February 2017	
Elspeth & Megan (replaced Mary & Katie)	Friends	Not on coach																												Fourth on 9 March 2012	
Chris & Liam (replaced Mo & Sophie)	Friends	Not on coach																								Yellow card			Red card	Eliminated 11th on 7 March 2012	
Katie & Mary (replaced Vic & Mick)	Mother & daughter	Not on coach																									Yellow card	Red card	Eliminated 10th on 6 March 2012		
Mick & Vic (replaced Chris & Jenny)	Friends	Not on coach																						Yellow card	Red card	Eliminated 9th on 1 March 2012					
Mo & Sophie (replaced Ladi & Tory)	Partners	Not on coach																				Yellow card	Red card	Eliminated 8th on 28 February 2012							
Chris & Jenny (replaced Jolyon & Edward)	Husband & wife	Not on coach																		Yellow card	Red card	Eliminated 7th on 24 February 2012									
Ladi & Tory (original 7)	Friends																			Walked 3rd on 22 February 2012											
Nigel & Sarah (replaced Felicity & Henry)	Father & daughter	Not on coach												Yellow card					Red card	Eliminated 6th on 22 February 2012											
Jolyon & Edward (original 7)	Friends														Yellow card		Red card	Eliminated 5th on 20 February 2012													
Gill & Pat (original 7)	Friends		Yellow card											Walked 2nd on 14 February 2012																	
Caroline & Gary (replaced Rachel & Rosie)	Husband & wife	Not on coach									Yellow card	Red card	Eliminated 4th on 13 February 2012																		
Felicity & Henry (original 7)	Partners									Yellow card			Walked 1st on 13 February 2012																		
Rachel & Rosie (replaced Jean & Lewis)	Girl & ex-boyfriend's mother	Not on coach				Yellow card		Red card	Eliminated 3rd on 7 February 2012																						
Ann & Dave (original 7)	Husband & wife				Yellow card		Red card	Eliminated 2nd on 6 February 2012																							
Jean & Lewis (original 7)	Grandmother & grandson	Yellow card		Red card	Eliminated 1st on 1 February 2012																										

== Voting history ==
Couple won the series	Couple were yellow carded	Couple were not present at the vote
Couple were runners up	Couple were red carded	Couple won a prize at the vote
Couple were third	Couple were immune from votes
Couple were fourth	Couple left the coach

	Day																													
	1	2	3	4	5	6	7	8	9	10	11	12	13	14	15	16	17	18	19	20	21	22	23	24	25	26	27	28	29	30
Craig Stuart	Not on Coach													Edward; Jolyon	Chez; Lou	Edward; Jolyon	Nigel; Sarah	Nigel; Sarah	Chris; Jenny	Chris; Jenny	Mo; Sophie	Mo; Sophie	Mick; Vic	Mick; Vic	Chris; Liam	Katie; Mary	Katie; Mary	Chris; Liam	Claire; Donna	Winners; 2 votes
Leah Ollie	Jean; Lewis	Gill; Pat	Jean; Lewis	Anne; Dave	Rachel; Rosie	Ladi; Tory	Rachel; Rosie	Edward; Jolyon	Felicity; Henry	Gill; Pat	Caroline; Gary	Chez; Lou	Nigel; Sarah	Edward; Jolyon	Nigel; Sarah	Nigel; Sarah	Claire; Donna	Ladi; Tory	Chris; Jenny	Chris; Jenny	Mo; Sophie	Mo; Sophie	Mick; Vic	Mick; Vic	Chris; Liam	Katie; Mary	Katie; Mary	Craig; Stuart	Craig; Stuart	Second; 2 votes
Chez Lou	Not on Coach							Leah; Ollie	Gill; Pat	Caroline; Gary	Caroline; Gary	Gill; Pat	Edward; Jolyon	Edward; Jolyon	Leah; Ollie	Nigel; Sarah	Nigel; Sarah	Nigel; Sarah	Chris; Jenny	Chris; Jenny	Mo; Sophie	Mo; Sophie	Mick; Vic	Mick; Vic	Chris; Liam	Katie; Mary	Katie; Mary	Chris; Liam	Leah; Ollie	Third; 1 vote
Donna Claire	Not on Coach													Jolyon; Edward	Stuart; Craig	Jolyon; Edward	Ollie; Leah	Sarah; Nigel	Chris; Jenny	Chloe; Charlie	Sophie; Mo	Sophie; Mo	Vic; Mick	Vic; Mick	Liam; Chris	Mary; Katie	Mary; Katie	Chloe; Charlie	Stuart; Craig	Third; 1 vote
Chloe Charlie	Not on Coach																		Donna; Claire	Chris; Jenny	Sophie; Mo	Sophie; Mo	Vic; Mick	Vic; Mick	Liam; Chris	Mary; Katie	Mary; Katie	Liam; Chris	Ollie; Leah	Fourth; 0 votes
Megan Elspeth	Not on Coach																											Ollie; Leah	Lou; Chez	Fourth; 0 votes
Liam Chris	Not on Coach																							Vic; Mick	Stuart; Craig	Stuart; Craig	Mary; Katie	Chloe; Charlie	Red Carded (Day 28)	
Mary Katie	Not on Coach																								Stuart; Craig	Lou; Chez	Stuart; Craig	Red Carded (Day 27)		
Vic Mick	Not on Coach																					Stuart; Craig	Chloe; Charlie	Ollie; Leah	Red Carded (Day 24)					
Sophie Mo	Not on Coach																			Ollie; Leah	Lou; Chez	Chloe; Charlie	Red Carded (Day 22)							
Chris Jenny	Not on Coach																	Ollie; Leah	Ollie; Leah	Stuart; Craig	Red Carded (Day 20)									
Ladi Tory	Anne; Dave	Anne; Dave	Jean; Lewis	Anne; Dave	Ollie; Leah	Anne; Dave	Rosie; Rachel	Henry; Felicity	Henry; Felicity	Gary; Caroline	Gary; Caroline	Lou; Chez	Sarah; Nigel	Sarah; Nigel	Jolyon; Edward	Sarah; Nigel	Donna; Claire	Sarah; Nigel	Walked (End of Day 18)											
Sarah Nigel	Not on Coach											Tory; Ladi	Jolyon; Edward	Jolyon; Edward	Donna; Claire	Jolyon; Edward	Lou; Chez	Lou; Chez	Red Carded (Day 18)											
Jolyon Edward	Jean; Lewis	Jean; Lewis	Jean; Lewis	Anne; Dave	Rosie; Rachel	Anne; Dave	Rosie; Rachel	Ollie; Leah	Ollie; Leah	Gary; Caroline	Gary; Caroline	Gill; Pat	Sarah; Nigel	Ollie; Leah	Ladi; Tory	Donna; Claire	Red Carded (Day 16)													
Gill Pat	Anne; Dave	Jean; Lewis	Henry; Felicity	Henry; Felicity	Rosie; Rachel	Ollie; Leah	Rosie; Rachel	Ladi; Tory	Lou; Chez	Gary; Caroline	Lou; Chez	Lou; Chez	Walked (End of Day 12)																	
Gary Caroline	Not on Coach							Ollie; Leah	Lou; Chez	Henry; Felicity	Lou; Chez	Red Carded (Day 11)																		
Henry Felicity	Jean; Lewis	Gill; Pat	Jean; Lewis	Anne; Dave	Rosie; Rachel	Rosie; Rachel	Rosie; Rachel	Ollie; Leah	Ladi; Tory	Gary; Caroline	Left	Walked (Start of Day 11)																		
Rosie Rachel	Not on Coach			Jolyon; Edward	Anne; Dave	Henry; Felicity	Ollie; Leah	Red Carded (Day 7)																						
Anne Dave	Ladi; Tory	Gill; Pat	Ladi; Tory	Henry; Felicity	Jolyon; Edward	Ladi; Tory	Red Carded (Day 6)																							
Jean Lewis	Gill; Pat	Jolyon; Edward	Ollie; Leah	Red Carded (Day 3)																										
Notes	none										^{1}	^{2}	none		^{3}	none		^{4}	none											
Walked	none										Henry; Felicity	Gill; Pat	none					Ladi; Tory	none											
Voted Off	Jean; Lewis; 3 votes	Gill; Pat; 3 votes	Jean; Lewis; 4 votes	Anne; Dave; 4 votes	Rosie; Rachel; 4 votes	Anne; Dave; 2 votes	Rosie; Rachel; 5 votes	Ollie; Leah; 4 votes	Henry; Felicity; 2 votes	Gary; Caroline; 5 votes	Gary; Caroline; 4 votes	Lou; Chez; 3 votes	Sarah; Nigel; 3 votes	Jolyon; Edward; 5 votes	none	Jolyon; Edward; 3 votes	Donna; Claire; 2 votes	Sarah; Nigel; 4 votes	Chris; Jenny; 4 votes	Chris; Jenny; 4 votes	Sophie; Mo; 5 votes	Sophie; Mo; 5 votes	Vic; Mick; 5 votes	Vic; Mick; 6 votes	Liam; Chris; 5 votes	Mary; Katie; 5 votes	Mary; Katie; 6 votes	Liam; Chris; 3 votes	none	

=== Notes ===
- ^1 On the morning of Day 11, Felicity & Henry decided to leave the trip, due to Felicity contracting flu.
- ^2 After the vote on Day 12, Gill & Pat were reunited and decided to leave the trip, due to Pat's chest infection.
- ^3 At the end of Day 15, Brendan announced that due to it being the half-way point of the trip, the couple with the most votes would win a special prize. However as every couple received 1 vote, the couples had to unanimously decide which couple should win the prize, this being Nigel & Sarah.
- ^4 At the end of Day 18, Brendan informed Ladi and Tory that he had arranged a flight home for them due to their exhaustion from enjoying the trip and to Ladi's increasing homesickness.

No post-vote arrivals, timekeepers or removals in series

== The Trip Day-by-Day ==
Day	Location	Activity	
Day	Location	Morning	Afternoon
1	Chelmsford	Essex-style makeover	
2	Amsterdam	Flower arranging	Ski slopes
3	Utrecht	The art of flirting	
4	Essen	Baking bread	Indoor skydiving
5	Koblenz	Land art tour	Cheerleading lesson
6	Mannheim	Curry sauce making	Baseball
7	Stuttgart	Beer tasting	River racing
8	Friedrichshafen	Segway racing	Zeppelin museum
9	Innsbruck	Tai chi	Bungee jump
10	Val Gardena	Wood-carving lesson	Llama racing
11	Lake Garda		
12	Padua	Biblical history lesson	Spa
13	Treviso & Venice	Pasta making	Golf
14	Adriatic Sea	Sailing	
15	Preveza	Olive picking	Beach
16	Arta, Greece	Fishing	Dance class
17	Dodoni	Ancient theatre	Goat-milking
18	Ioannina	Rafting trip	Jewellery workshop
19	Grevena	Truffle hunting	Painting
20	Thessaloniki	Snorkelling	Cocktail making
21	Kavadarci	Bulgarian dance lesson	Grape squashing
22	Skopje	Mother Teresa's birthplace	Kite-flying
23	Kyustendil	Local baths	Clay making
24	Sofia	Zoo keeping	Zorbing
25	Plovdiv	Gymnastics	Rowing
26	Haskovo	Cooking lesson	Go-karting
27	Edirne	Soap molding	Local baths
28	Silivri	Belly dancing	Turkish wrestling
29	Istanbul	Spice market	Swimming with dolphins
30	It's the long journey home for the coach tripper and Brendan reminisces about the last six weeks on the road.		
