= Coach Trip series 7 =

Coach Trip
- Series 7
- No. of days: 30
- Winners: Katie & Nathan
- Runners-up: Bonnie & Sam

Release
- Original network: Channel 4
- Original release: 29 August – 7 October 2011

Additional information
- Filming dates: May 2011 – June 2011

Series chronology
- ← Previous; Series 6 Next → Series 8

Coach Trip 7 is the seventh series of Coach Trip in the United Kingdom. It was filmed from May until June 2011 (after the UK anti-austerity protests began) and aired from 29 August to 7 October 2011. The length of this series was the same as the previous non-celebrity series but with weekends excluded. The tour began in the UK, before moving to France, Germany, Switzerland, Liechtenstein, Austria, Hungary, the Czech Republic plus for the first time ever Poland and Slovakia. Tour guide Brendan Sheerin, coach driver Paul Donald, narrator Dave Vitty and the coach with registration number MT09 MTT all returned for this series, which was aired on Channel 4 with the airing time reverted to 5:00pm, a similar start to series 1 and a similar end to series 3.

== Contestants ==
Couple were aboard the coach	Couple got yellow carded	Couple were removed from the coach
Couple were immune from votes	Couple got red carded
Couple left the coach	Couple were not present at the vote

Couple	Relationship	Trip Duration (Days)																													
Couple	Relationship	1	2	3	4	5	6	7	8	9	10	11	12	13	14	15	16	17	18	19	20	21	22	23	24	25	26	27	28	29	30
Nathan & Katie (replaced Tony & Wolfy)	Friends	Not on coach																													Winners on 7 October 2011
Bonnie & Sam (replacing Frankie & Alice)	Girlfriends	Not on coach																													Second on 7 October 2011
Alison & Ashley (original 7)	Engaged Partners		Yellow card																												Third on 7 October 2011
Danielle & Lauren (replaced Helen & Daniel)	Friends	Not on coach																			Yellow card										Third on 7 October 2011
Fiona & Oliver (replaced Wayne & Nigel)	Mother & Son	Not on coach																										Yellow card			Fourth on 7 October 2011
Stephen & Margaret (replaced Annette & Martin)	Husband & Wife	Not on coach																											Yellow card		Fourth on 7 October 2011
Rosemary & Judith (replaced Tom & Anita)	Friends	Not on coach																													Fourth; 7 October 2011
Tom & Anita (original 7)	Colleagues	Not on coach																								Yellow card	Red card	Eliminated 13th on 3 October 2011			
Annette & Martin (replaced Lynne & Steve)	Husband & Wife	Not on coach																Yellow card							Red card	Eliminated 12th on 29 September 2011					
Wayne & Nigel (replaced Tina & Monica)	Salsa dancers	Not on coach																					Yellow card	Red card	Eliminated 11th on 28 September 2011						
Jamie & Mark (original 7)	Friends					Yellow card																Red card	Eliminated 10th on 26 September 2011								
Tina & Monica (replaced Linda & Chris)	Friends	Not on coach																	Yellow card	Red card	Eliminated 9th on 22 September 2011										
Helen & Daniel (replaced Araf & Uzi)	Mother & Son	Not on coach														Yellow card	Red card	Eliminated 8th on 19 September 2011													
Linda & Chris (original 7)	Hairdresser & Client						Yellow card								Red card	Eliminated 7th on 15 September 2011															
Lynne & Steve (replaced Kyale & Olivia)	Husband & Wife	Not on coach									Yellow card			Red card	Eliminated 6th on 14 September 2011																
Araf & Uzi (replaced Helen & Dave)	Uncle & Nephew	Not on coach										Yellow card	Red card	Eliminated 5th on 13 September 2011																	
Helen & Dave (original 7)	Father & Daughter								Yellow card	Red card	Eliminated 4th on 8 September 2011																				
Frankie & Alice (original 7)	Husband & Wife							Yellow card		Walked 1st on 7 September 2011																					
Tony & Wolfy (original 7)	Friends							Red card	Eliminated 3rd on 6 September 2011																						
Kyale & Olivia (replaced Mark & Laura)	Flatmates	Not on coach		Yellow card	Red card	Eliminated 2nd on 31 August 2011																									
Mark & Laura (original 7)	Partners	Red card	Eliminated 1st on 29 August 2011																												

== Contestants (In Order of Elimination and Withdrawal) ==
- Mark & Laura, Partners from Torquay. (Original 7. Red-carded on Day 1 after the announcement was made that whoever received the most votes that day would be instantly sent home without leaving the UK.) (Shortest stay of any mixed couple on Coach Trip.)
- Kyale & Olivia, Flatmates from London. (Joined on Day 2, replacing Mark & Laura. Red-carded on Day 4.)
- Tony & Wolfy, Friends from North London. (Original 7. Red-carded on Day 7 for bad behaviour and excessive partying.)
- Frankie & Alice, Friends from Yorkshire. (Original 7. Walked on Day 8 after receiving the previous day's yellow card and in protest of Tony & Wolfy being red-carded.)
- Helen & Dave, Father and daughter from Barnsley. (Original 7. Red-carded on Day 9.)
- Araf & Uzi, Uncle and nephew from Middlesbrough and North London. (Joined on Day 10, replacing Helen & Dave. Red-carded on Day 12.)
- Lynne & Steve, Preacher and her husband (Joined on Day 6, replacing Kyale & Olivia. Red-carded on Day 13.)
- Linda & Chris, Hairdresser and client (Original 7. Red-carded on Day 14.)
- Helen & Daniel, Mother and son from The Wirral. (Joined on Day 14, replacing Araf & Uzi. Red-carded on Day 16.)
- Tina & Monica, Friends from Birmingham. (Joined on Day 16, replacing Linda & Chris. Red-carded on Day 19.)
- Jamie & Mark, Friends from Newcastle Upon Tyne. (Original 7. Red-carded on Day 21.)
- Wayne & Nigel, Salsa dancers from Bristol. (Joined on Day 21, replacing Tina & Monica. Red-carded on Day 23.)
- Annette & Martin, Married antique dealers from Cornwall. (Joined on Day 15, replacing Lynne & Steve. Red-carded on Day 24.)
- Tom & Anita, Colleagues from Leeds. (Joined on Day 23 replacing Jamie & Mark. Red-carded on Day 26.)
- Alison & Ashley, Engaged partners from Bolton. (Original 7. Lasted until Final Day.)
- Nathan & Katie, Friends, Cheerleaders and trainee teachers from Brighton (Joined on Day 8, replacing Tony & Wolfy. Winners.)
- Bonnie & Sam, Goth girlfriends from Norwich. (Joined on Day 9, replacing Frankie & Alice. Lasted until Final Day.)
- Danielle & Lauren, Friends from Blackpool and Hale, Greater Manchester. (Joined on Day 19, replacing Helen & Daniel. Lasted until Final Day.)
- Fiona & Oliver, Mother and son from Rochdale (Joined on Day 25, replacing Wayne & Nigel. Lasted until Final Day.)
- Stephen & Margaret, Husband and wife (Joined on Day 26, replacing Annette & Martin. Lasted until Final Day.)
- Rosemary & Judith, Friends (Joined on Day 28, replacing Tom and Anita. Lasted until Final Day.)

(Note: Contestants in italics yellow-carded without being voted off and left without being voted off).

== Voting History ==
Indicates that the couple received a yellow card
Indicates that the couple was red carded off the trip
Indicates that the couple left the coach due to other reasons than being voted off or being removed from the coach
Indicates that the couple was immune from any votes cast against them due to it either being their first vote or winning immunity from the vote
Indicates that the couple were voted as the most popular couple and won series
Indicates that the couple were voted as the second most popular couple
Indicates that the couple were voted as the third most popular couple
Indicates that the couple were voted as the fourth most popular couple

	Day																													
	1	2	3	4	5	6	7	8	9	10	11	12	13	14	15	16	17	18	19	20	21	22	23	24	25	26	27	28	29	30
Nathan Katie	Not on Coach							Lynne; Steve	Helen; Dave	Lynne; Steve	Araf; Uzi	Araf; Uzi	Linda; Chris	Linda; Chris	Helen; Daniel	Helen; Daniel	Tina; Monica	Tina; Monica	Tina; Monica	Alison; Ashley	Jamie; Mark	Alison; Ashley	Wayne; Nigel	Annette; Martin	Tom; Anita	Tom; Anita	Fiona; Oliver	Stephen; Margaret	Danielle; Lauren	Winners; 3 votes
Bonnie Sam	Not on Coach								Helen; Dave	Lynne; Steve	Araf; Uzi	Jamie; Mark	Jamie; Mark	Linda; Chris	Helen; Daniel	Helen; Daniel	Annette; Martin	Tina; Monica	Tina; Monica	Annette; Martin	Jamie; Mark	Wayne; Nigel	Wayne; Nigel	Tom; Anita	Tom; Anita	Tom; Anita	Fiona; Oliver	Stephen; Margaret	Alison; Ashley	Second; 2 votes
Alison Ashley	Laura; Mark	Helen; Dave	Tony; Wolfy	Tony; Wolfy	Jamie; Mark	Helen; Dave	Lynne; Steve	Helen; Dave	Helen; Dave	Lynne; Steve	Araf; Uzi	Araf; Uzi	Lynne; Steve	Nathan; Katie	Helen; Daniel	Helen; Daniel	Annette; Martin	Tina; Monica	Tina; Monica	Danielle; Lauren	Danielle; Lauren	Wayne; Nigel	Wayne; Nigel	Annette; Martin	Tom; Anita	Tom; Anita	Fiona; Oliver	Stephen; Margaret	Bonnie; Sam	Third; 1 vote
Danielle Lauren	Not on Coach																		Tina; Monica	Annette; Martin	Alison; Ashley	Alison; Ashley	Wayne; Nigel	Tom; Anita	Tom; Anita	Fiona; Oliver	Fiona; Oliver	Fiona; Oliver	Nathan; Katie	Third; 1 vote
Fiona Oliver	Not on Coach																								Alison; Ashley	Danielle; Lauren	Danielle; Lauren	Stephen; Margaret	Bonnie; Sam	Fourth; 0 votes
Stephen Margaret	Not on Coach																									Alison; Ashley	Fiona; Oliver	Fiona; Oliver	Nathan; Katie	Fourth; 0 votes
Rosemary Judith	Not on Coach																											Nathan; Katie	Nathan; Katie	Fourth; 0 votes
Tom Anita	Not on Coach																						Bonnie; Sam	Danielle; Lauren	Nathan; Katie	Nathan; Katie	Red Carded (Day 26)			
Annette Martin	Not on Coach														Nathan; Katie	Alison; Ashley	Alison; Ashley	Tina; Monica	Tina; Monica	Danielle; Lauren	Jamie; Mark	Wayne; Nigel	Wayne; Nigel	Alison; Ashley	Red Carded (Day 24)					
Wayne Nigel	Not on Coach																				Bonnie; Sam	Alison; Ashley	Annette; Martin	Red Carded (Day 23)						
Jamie Mark	Laura; Mark	Alison; Ashley	Kyale; Olivia	Linda; Chris	Linda; Chris	Linda; Chris	Frankie; Alice	Lynne; Steve	Lynne; Steve	Lynne; Steve	Bonnie; Sam	Bonnie; Sam	Lynne; Steve	Bonnie; Sam	Helen; Daniel	Helen; Daniel	Annette; Martin	Tina; Monica	Tina; Monica	Nathan; Katie	Bonnie; Sam	Red Carded (Day 21)								
Tina Monica	Not on Coach															Alison; Ashley	Annette; Martin	Nathan; Katie	Bonnie; Sam	Red Carded (Day 19)										
Helen Daniel	Not on Coach													Linda; Chris	Nathan; Katie	Alison; Ashley	Red Carded (Day 16)													
Linda Chris	Laura; Mark	Frankie; Alice	Jamie; Mark	Kyale; Olivia	Jamie; Mark	Helen; Dave	Helen; Dave	Helen; Dave	Helen; Dave	Bonnie; Sam	Araf; Uzi	Araf; Uzi	Lynne; Steve	Nathan; Katie	Red Carded (Day 14)															
Lynne Steve	Not on Coach					Helen; Dave	Frankie; Alice	Helen; Dave	Helen; Dave	Nathan; Katie	Araf; Uzi	Araf; Uzi	Jamie; Mark	Red Carded (Day 13)																
Araf Uzi	Not on Coach									Lynne; Steve	Bonnie; Sam	Bonnie; Sam	Red Carded (Day 12)																	
Helen Dave	Tony; Wolfy	Alison; Ashley	Alison; Ashley	Kyale; Olivia	Tony; Wolfy	Linda; Chris	Frankie; Alice	Lynne; Steve	Lynne; Steve	Red Carded (Day 9)																				
Frankie Alice	Laura; Mark	Alison; Ashley	Linda; Chris	Kyale; Olivia	Jamie; Mark	Linda; Chris	Helen; Dave	^{See; Note 3}	Walked (Start of Day 8)																					
Tony Wolfy	Alison; Ashley	Alison; Ashley	Kyale; Olivia	Dave; Helen	Alison; Ashley	Alison; Ashley	^{See; Note 2}	Red Carded (Day 7)																						
Kyale Olivia	Not on Coach	Alison; Ashley	Tony; Wolfy	Tony; Wolfy	Red Carded (Day 4)																									
Laura Mark	Frankie; Alice ^{1}	Red Carded (Day 1)																												
Walked	none							Frankie; Alice	none																					
Timekeeping	none						Tony; Wolfy	none																						
Removed	none						Tony; Wolfy	none																						
Voted Off	Laura; Mark; 4 votes	Alison; Ashley; 5 votes	Kyale; Olivia; 2 votes	Kyale; Olivia; 3 votes	Jamie; Mark; 3 votes	Linda; Chris; 3 votes	Frankie; Alice; 3 votes	Helen; Dave; 3 votes	Helen; Dave; 5 votes	Lynne; Steve; 5 votes	Araf; Uzi; 5 votes	Araf; Uzi; 4 votes	Lynne; Steve; 3 votes	Linda; Chris; 3 votes	Helen; Daniel; 4 votes	Helen; Daniel; 4 votes	Annette; Martin; 4 votes	Tina; Monica; 5 votes	Tina; Monica; 6 votes	Danielle; Lauren; 2 votes	Jamie; Mark; 3 votes	Wayne; Nigel; 3 votes	Wayne; Nigel; 5 votes	Annette; Martin; 2 votes	Tom; Anita; 4 votes	Tom; Anita; 3 votes	Fiona; Oliver; 5 votes	Stephen; Margaret; 4 votes	none	

=== Notes ===
- ^1 On Day 1, Brendan instated an opening voting rule - on vote time the couple who received the most votes would get an immediate red card without entering mainland Europe, this happened to be Laura & Mark making them join Delia & Jacqui of series 3 to the shortest stay records.
- ^2 Tony & Wolfy were removed with a red card on Day 7 for inappropriate behaviour during the previous night, including being very loud and drunk and disturbing other tourists in the hotel previously held by Alan & Lorenzo of series 2 and Jasmine & Rara of series 6.
- ^3 Frankie & Alice walked at the start of Day 8 in protest because Wolfy and Tony were unfairly red carded.

No post-vote arrivals in series

== The Trip Day-by-Day ==
Day	Location	Activity	
Day	Location	Morning	Afternoon
1	Channel Tunnel	Thames boat ride	Pole-dancing lesson
2	Paris (Part 1)	Perfume making	
3	Paris (Part 2)	French circus school	Theme park
4	Épernay	Vineyard visit	Zip-wiring
5	Metz	Cooking and eating snails	Kayaking
6	Baden-Baden	Local car museum	Horse Racing
7	Black Forest	Archery	Pedalos
8	Rhine Falls	VIP trip around Rhine Falls	Farmyard games
9	Zürich	Swiss chocolate factory	
10	Lichtenstein, Baden-Württemberg	Cookery class	Rope course
11	Kempten	Pretzel factory	
12	Munich	Paddle-board surfing	
13	Zugspitze & Garmisch-Partenkirchen	Mount Wank	Tobogganing
14	Salzburg	Mozart singing	Break dancing
15	Wels	Cook off	Chariot racing
16	Vienna	Gold leaf gilding	Historic fun park
17	Győr	Karate lesson	Wake boarding
18	Budapest	Nuclear fallout drill	Thermal spa
19	Nitra	Fantasy role play	
20	Bratislava	White-water rafting	Summer bobsleighing
21	Brno	Salsa class	Cave exploration
22	Štramberk & Ostrava	Castle abseil	Grass skiing
23	Bielsko-Biała	Brewery	Dancing
24	Kraków	Salt mines	Bicycle collection
25	Katowice	Sausage, soup and beetroot salad making	
26	Wrocław	Statue hunting	
27	Poland/Germany	Polish pottery lesson	German riverboat trip
28	Germany		
29	Berlin	Berlin Wall graffiti lesson	Cocktail making
30	Brendan and the Brits take a moment to reflect on all the fun they've had over the last six weeks.		
