= Celebrity Coach Trip series 1 =

Season of television series

Celebrity Coach Trip
- Season 1
- No. of days: 10
- Winner: Barry & Paul Elliott
- Runners-up: Ricky Groves & Alex Ferns

Release
- Original network: Channel 4
- Original release: 8 November 2010 – November 19, 2010

Additional information
- Filming dates: 6 September – 20 September 2010

Series chronology
- Next → Series 2

Celebrity Coach Trip 1 was the first series of Celebrity Coach Trip which was filmed from 6 to 20 September 2010 and began airing on 8 November 2010. The series featured a variety of celebrity couples on a 10-day tour, the couples get to vote off the other couples that they do not get along with. On the last day of the coach trip the remaining couples vote for the couple that they want to win the £1000 prize for charity. The first day of the coach trip started in Prague and the last day of the trip ended in Venice. Tour guide Brendan Sheerin, narrator Dave Vitty, coach driver Paul Donald and the MT09 MTT registration all returned for this series, which aired on Channel 4.

== Voting System ==
The Voting system on this series was:

Days 1 to 4 was a yellow card
Days 5 to 9 an automatic red card

== Contestants ==
Indicates the couple were aboard the coach
Indicates the couple were immune from votes
Indicates that the couple were voted as the most popular couple and won series
Indicates that the couple were voted as the second most popular couple
Indicates that the couple were voted as the third most popular couple
Indicates the couple got a yellow card
Indicates the couple got a red card

Celebrity Couple	Trip Duration (Days)									
Celebrity Couple	1	2	3	4	5	6	7	8	9	10
Ben & Raef (original 5)	Yellow card				Red card	Eliminated 1st on 12 November 2010				
Bianca & Imogen (original 5)		Yellow card				Red card	Eliminated 2nd on 15 November 2010			
David & Tony	Not on coach						Red card	Eliminated 3rd on 16 November 2010		
Cheryl & Rodney (replaced Bianca & Imogen)	Not on coach							Red card	Eliminated 4th on 17 November 2010	
Colin & Justin (replaced Ben & Raef)	Not on coach								Red card	Eliminated 5th on 18 November 2010
Gabriela & Monica (replaced David & Tony)	Not on coach									Third on 19 November 2010
Carol & Ingrid (original 5)										Third on 19 November 2010
Alex & Ricky (original 5)			Yellow card							Second on 19 November 2010
Barry & Paul (original 5)				Yellow card						Winners on 19 November 2010

== Voting history ==
Indicates that the couple received the most votes and received a yellow card
Indicates that the couple received the most votes and were red carded off the trip
Indicates that it was the couple's first vote meaning they could not be voted for
Indicates that the couple were voted as the most popular couple and won series
Indicates that the couple were voted as the second most popular couple
Indicates that the couple were voted as the third most popular couple

	Day										
	1	2	3	4	5	6	7	8	9	10	
Barry Paul	Ben; Raef	Bianca; Imogen	Carol; Ingrid	Alex; Ricky	Ben; Raef	Bianca; Imogen	David; Tony	Cheryl; Rodney	Colin; Justin	Alex; Ricky	Winners; 3 votes
Alex Ricky	Ben; Raef	Bianca; Imogen	Bianca; Imogen	Barry; Paul	Ben; Raef	Bianca; Imogen	David; Tony	Cheryl; Rodney	Colin; Justin	Barry; Paul	Second; 1 votes
Carol Ingrid	Ben; Raef	Bianca; Imogen	Barry; Paul	Alex; Ricky	Bianca; Imogen	Bianca; Imogen	David; Tony	Cheryl; Rodney	Colin; Justin	Barry; Paul	Third; 0 votes
Gabriela Monica	Not on coach								Alex; Ricky	Barry; Paul	Third; 0 votes
Colin Justin	Not on coach					Alex; Ricky	David; Tony	Cheryl; Rodney	Barry; Paul	Red Carded (Day 9)	
Cheryl Rodney	Not on coach						David; Tony	Alex; Ricky	Red Carded (Day 8)		
David Tony	Not on coach					Alex; Ricky	Carol; Ingrid	Red Carded (Day 7)			
Bianca Imogen	Carol; Ingrid	Alex; Ricky	Alex; Ricky	Barry; Paul	Alex; Ricky	Carol; Ingrid	Red Carded (Day 6)				
Ben Raef	Carol; Ingrid	Alex; Ricky	Alex; Ricky	Barry; Paul	Alex; Ricky	Red Carded (Day 5)					
Walked	None										
Voted Off	Ben; Raef; 3 votes	Bianca; Imogen; 3 votes	Alex; Ricky; 2 votes	Barry; Paul; 3 votes	Ben; Raef; 3 votes	Bianca; Imogen; 3 votes	David; Tony; 5 votes	Cheryl; Rodney; 4 votes	Colin; Justin; 3 votes	None	

== The trip by day ==
Day	Location	Activity	
Day	Location	Morning	Afternoon
1	Prague	Czech National Ballet lesson	Soviet tank ride
2	Plzeň	Puppet show	Beer bathing
3	Regensburg	Sausage making	River cruise
4	Passau	Accordion lesson	Canoeing down the Danube
5	Linz	The Museum of the Future	AquaSphering
6	Salzburg	Six cup	Segway tour
7	Innsbruck	Zoo trip	Bobsleighing
8	Innsbruck	Buildings sightseeing	Italian cookery lesson
8	Trento	Buildings sightseeing	Italian cookery lesson
9	Verona	Juliet's balcony	Opera lesson
10	Venice	Venetian mask making	Gondola ride
