= Coach Trip series 1 =

Coach Trip
- Series 1
- Presented by: Brendan Sheerin
- No. of days: 30
- Winners: Maggie & Paul
- Runners-up: Brian & Reneé

Release
- Original network: Channel 4
- Original release: 7 March – 19 April 2005

Additional information
- Filming dates: April 2004 – June 2004

Series chronology
- Next → Series 2

Coach Trip 1 is the first series of Coach Trip (a Channel 4 programme) that was filmed from April to June 2004 and aired from 7 March to 19 April 2005. The trip went through several European countries. Chris Groombridge was the driver for the only time, Brendan Sheerin was the tour guide, Andy Love was narrator and the registration was T100 MTT.

== Contestants ==
Couple were aboard the coach	Couple got yellow carded
Couple were immune from votes	Couple got red carded
Couple weren't present at the vote	Vote was cancelled
Couple left the coach	Couple were removed from the coach

Couple	Relationship	Trip Duration (Days)																													
Couple	Relationship	1	2	3	4	5	6	7	8	9	10	11	12	13	14	15	16	17	18	19	20	21	22	23	24	25	26	27	28	29	30
Maggie and Paul (replaced Max & Tom)	Mother and Son	Not on coach																										Yellow card			Winners
Brian and Reneé (replaced Paul and Trevor)	Husband and wife	Not on coach																									Yellow card				Second
Jane and Michelle (replaced Emma and Sally)	Nurses, Friends and reality TV fans	Not on coach																											Yellow card		Third
Suki and Winter (replaced Alan and Carol)	Friends	Not on coach																						Yellow card							Fourth
Gavin and Nathan (replaced Nicky and Siobhan)	Brothers	Not on coach																							Yellow card						Fourth
Debbie and Tracey (replaced Dorothy and Thadie)	Friends & Artists	Not on coach																								Yellow card					Fourth
Eileen and Lisa (replaced Bob and Pasquale)	Aunt and niece	Not on coach																													Fourth
Dorothy and Thadie (replaced Barbara and Pete)	Cousins	Not on coach																				Yellow card	Red card	Eliminated 9th							
Nicky and Siobhan (replaced Angela and Eden)	Friends	Not on coach																			Yellow card		Walked 5th								
Emma and Sally (original 7)	Sisters															Yellow card				Red card	Eliminated 8th										
Max and Tom (original 7)	Friends																			Red card	Removed 1st										
Paul and Trevor (replaced Joanne and Steph)	Friends	Not on coach										Yellow card							Red card	Eliminated 7th											
Alan and Carol (replaced Ellen and Rose)	Husband and wife	Not on coach																		Walked 4th											
Barbara and Pete (original 7)	Husband and wife																		Walked 3rd												
Bob and Pasquale (replaced Eva and Robert)	Partners	Not on coach															Yellow card		Walked 2nd												
Angela and Eden (replaced Marion and Phil)	Partners	Not on coach													Yellow card				Walked 1st												
Ellen and Rose (replaced Nicki and Vander)	Friends	Not on coach									Yellow card			Red card	Eliminated 6th																
Marion and Phil (original 7)	Husband and wife									Yellow card			Red card	Eliminated 5th																	
Joanne and Steph (original 7)	Friends					Yellow card			Red card	Eliminated 4th																					
Nicki and Vander (replaced Jaki and John)	Friends	Not on coach					Yellow card	Red card	Eliminated 3rd																						
Jaki and John (original 7)	Colleagues and friends			Yellow card	Red card	Eliminated 2nd																									
Eva and Robert (original 7)	Husband and wife	Yellow card	Red card	Eliminated 1st																											

== Voting History ==
Couple won the series	Couple were yellow carded	Couple were not present at the vote
Couple were runners up	Couple were red carded
Couple came third	Couple were immune from votes
Couple came fourth	Couple were removed from the coach
Couple left the coach	Voting was cancelled

	Day																													
	1	2	3	4	5	6	7	8	9	10	11	12	13	14	15	16	17	18	19	20	21	22	23	24	25	26	27	28	29	30
Maggie Paul	Not on Coach																			Nickie; Siobhan	Dorothy; Thadie	Eileen; Lisa	Suki; Winter	Suki; Winter	Gavin; Nathan	Brian; Reneé	Jane; Michelle	Suki; Winter	Jane; Michelle	Winners; 3 votes
Brian Reneé	Not on Coach																		Emma; Sally	Eileen; Lisa	Dorothy; Thadie	Dorothy; Thadie	Eileen; Lisa	Debbie; Tracey	Debbie; Tracey	Jane; Michelle	Maggie; Paul	Jane; Michelle	Suki; Winter	Second; 2 votes
Jane Michelle	Not on Coach																			Nickie; Siobhan	Dorothy; Thadie	Dorothy; Thadie	Suki; Winter	Nathan; Gavin	Debbie; Tracey	Eileen; Lisa	Maggie; Paul	Gavin; Nathan	Brian; Reneé	Third; 1 vote
Suki Winter	Not on Coach																		Dorothy; Thadie	Nickie; Siobhan	Dorothy; Thadie	Dorothy; Thadie	Maggie; Paul	Gavin; Nathan	Debbie; Tracey	Jane; Michelle	Maggie; Paul	Nathan; Gavin	Brian; Reneé	Third; 1 vote
Gavin Nathan	Not on Coach																						Suki; Winter	Debbie; Tracey	Debbie; Tracey	Brian; Reneé	Jane; Michelle	Jane; Michelle	Maggie; Paul	Fourth; 0 votes
Debbie Tracey	Not on Coach																						Suki; Winter	Nathan; Gavin	Brain; Reneé	Gavin; Nathan	Eileen; Lisa	Jane; Michelle	Maggie; Paul	Fourth; 0 votes
Eileen Lisa	Not on Coach																	Paul; Trevor	Emma; Sally	Dorothy; Thadie	Dorothy; Thadie	Maggie; Paul	Suki; Winter	Nathan; Gavin	Jane; Michelle	Brian; Reneé	Maggie; Paul	Jane; Michelle	Maggie; Paul	Fourth; 0 votes
Dorothy Thadie	Not on Coach																	Max; Tom	Eileen; Lisa	Suki; Winter	Maggie; Paul	Jane; Michelle	Red Carded (Day 22)							
Nicky Siobhan	Not on Coach																	Max; Tom	Emma; Sally	Brian; Reneé	Left	Walked (Day 21)								
Emma Sally	Marion; Phil	Eva; Robert	Jaki; John	Jaki; John	Bob; Pasquale	Nicki; Vander	Bob; Pasquale	Joanne; Steph	Marion; Phil	Ellen; Rose	Ellen; Rose	Marion; Phil	Ellen; Rose	Eden; Angela	Eden; Angela	Bob; Pasquale	Cancelled	Paul; Trevor	Nickie; Siobhan	Red Carded (Day 19)										
Max Tom	Jaki; John	Eva; Robert	Jaki; John	Jaki; John	Marion; Phil	Nicki; Vander	Nicki; Vander	Joanne; Steph	Marion; Phil	Ellen; Rose	Pau; Trevor	Marion; Phil	Ellen; Rose	Angela; Eden	Eden; Angela	Bob; Pasquale	Cancelled	Paul; Trevor	Removed	Removed (Day 19)										
Paul Trevor	Not on Coach								Barbara; Pete	Max; Tom	Marion; Phil	Marion; Phil	Barbara; Pete	Emma; Sally	Emma; Sally	Eden; Angela	Cancelled	Emma; Sally	Red Carded (Day 18)											
Alan Carol	Not on Coach														Emma; Sally	Max; Tom	Cancelled	N/A	Walked (Day 18)											
Barbara Pete	Eva; Robert	Eva; Robert	Joanne; Steph	Jaki; John	Joanne; Steph	Nicki; Vander	Nicki; Vander	Joanne; Steph	Bob; Pasquale	Ellen; Rose	Paul; Trevor	Paul; Trevor	Ellen; Rose	Angela; Eden	Angela; Eden	Bob; Pasquale	Left	Walked (Day 17)												
Bob Pasquale	Not on Coach		Jaki; John	Jaki; John	Emma; Sally	Emma; Sally	Marion; Phil	Max; Tom	Marion; Phil	Barbara; Pete	Paul; Trevor	Marion; Phil	Ellen; Rose	Max; Tom	Emma; Sally	Max; Tom	Left	Walked (Day 17)												
Angela Eden	Not on Coach												Barbara; Pete	Paul; Trevor	Emma; Sally	Max; Tom	Left	Walked (Day 17)												
Ellen Rose	Not on Coach							N/A	Emma; Sally	Emma; Sally	Barbara; Pete	Marion; Phil	Barbara; Pete	Red Carded (Day 13)																
Marion Phil	Eva; Robert	Joanne; Steph	Emma; Sally	Max; Tom	Bob; Pasquale	Nicki; Vander	Nicki; Vander	Joanne; Steph	Emma; Sally	Paul; Trevor	Paul; Trevor	Max; Tom	Red Carded (Day 12)																	
Joanne Steph	Marion; Phil	Eva; Robert	Marion; Phil	Barbara; Pete	Emma; Sally	Emma; Sally	Barbara; Pete	None	Red Carded (Day 8)																					
Nicki Vander	Not on coach				Joanne; Steph	Emma; Sally	Bob; Pasquale	Red Carded (Day 7)																						
Jaki John	Eva; Robert	Max; Tom	Max; Tom	Bob; Pasquale	Red Carded (Day 4)																									
Eva Robert	Joanne; Steph	Jaki; John	Red Carded (Day 2)																											
Notes	None							^{1}	None								^{2} ^{3}	^{4}	^{5}	None										
Walked	None																Angela; Eden	Alan; Carol	None		Nickie; Siobhan	None								
Walked	None																Bob; Pasquale	Alan; Carol	None		Nickie; Siobhan	None								
Walked	None																Barbara; Pete	Alan; Carol	None		Nickie; Siobhan	None								
Removed	None																		Max; Tom	None										
Voted Off	Robert; Eva; 3 votes	Robert; Eva; 4 votes	Jaki; John; 3 votes	Jaki; John; 4 votes	Joanna; Steph; 2 votes	Nicki; Vander; 4 votes	Nicki; Vander; 2 votes	Joanne; Steph; 4 votes	Marion; Phil; 3 votes	Ellen; Rose; 3 votes	Paul; Trevor; 4 votes	Marion; Phil; 5 votes	Ellen; Rose; 4 votes	Angela; Eden; 3 votes	Emma; Sally; 4 votes	Bob; Pasquale; 3 votes	None	Paul; Trevor; 3 votes	Emma; Sally; 3 votes	Nickie; Siobhan; 3 votes	Dorothy; Thadie; 5 votes	Dorothy; Thadie; 4 votes	Suki; Winter; 4 votes	Gavin; Nathan; 4 votes	Debbie; Tracey; 4 votes	Brian; Renee; 3 votes	Maggie; Paul; 4 votes	Jane; Michelle; 4 votes	None	

=== Notes ===
^1 There was no need for Joanne & Steph to cast their vote, as they had already been voted off by the other couples.

^2 Due to 3 of the couples leaving the coach that day, Brendan cancelled the vote.

^3 Three couples walked on Day 17 of the trip:
Angela & Eden walked after a slight delay the previous night.
Bob & Pasquale walked after Pete's aggressive behaviour the previous night.
Barbara & Pete walked after a fight the previous night but Brendan later claimed they would have been disqualified for nounal abuse.

^4 Alan & Carol left the coach as Alan was hospitalised with a collapsed lung.

^5 Max & Tom were removed with a red card on Day 19 for bad behaviour throughout the trip and refusing to continue but as noted given in later series.

== The trip by day ==
Day	Location	Activity	
Day	Location	Morning	Afternoon
1	Amsterdam (London pick up point)	Visit to a clog maker	Canal boat trip
2	Brussels	Chocolate factory tour	Belgium beer brewery
3	Koblenz	German language lesson	Castle tour
4	Baden-Baden	Black Forest Gateaux lesson	Spa trip
5	Munich	Visit to the Olympic Tower	Trip to a marketplace
6	Salzburg	Salt mines tour	Sound of Music tour
7	Linz	Cruise down the river Danube	Museum of the Future
8	Vienna	Trip to the world's oldest zoo	Go-kart racing
9	Graz	Pumpkin seed oil mill tour	Nordic walk
10	Ljubljana	Guided tour	Horse farm trip
11	Venice	Guided tour	Venetian mask making
12	Bologna	Pasta making lesson	Lamborghini museum
13	Orvieto	Pizza making	Wine tasting
14	Rome	Tour of the Colosseum	Visit to the Trevi Fountain
15	Florence	Art Lesson	Free Time (Shopping)
16	Pisa & Parma	Leaning Tower of Pisa	Cheese Factory
17	Lugano	Chocolate Factory	Relaxing at the Lakes
18	Turin	Seeing the Shroud of Turin	
19	St Veran	CANCELLED	CANCELLED (Snowball fight)
20	Monaco	Tour of Monaco	Looking around a Luxury Yacht
21	Arles & Nîmes	Ampitheatre/Gladiator Show	Olive Grove visit
22	Andorra le Ville	NONE	Spa Visit
23	Barcelona	Sagrada Família	Paella Making
24	Zaragoza	Bull Ring Visit	Traditional music and dance demostration
25	La Rioja & Bilbao	Wine Tasting Lesson	Guggenheim Museum
26	San Sebastián	Aquarium (Beach trip Cancelled)	Shopping or Spa Visit (Funfair trip Cancelled)
27	Biarritz & Bordeaux	Surfing	Wine Tasting
28	Poitiers	Animal Park	Chateau Tour
29	Paris	Seine Boat Trip	Local Food Tasting
30	The coach makes its way back home to London, giving everyone a chance to recall the highlights of their extraordinary 30-day European coach adventure.		
