= Coach Trip series 2 =

Coach Trip
- Series 2
- No. of days: 30
- Winners: Joy & Paul
- Runners-up: Ann & Doris; Jamie & Mary; Dennis & Jackie; Matt & Scott

Release
- Original network: Channel 4
- Original release: 22 May – 30 June 2006

Additional information
- Filming dates: May 2005 – July 2005

Series chronology
- ← Previous; Series 1 Next → Series 3

Coach Trip 2 is the second series of Coach Trip (a Channel 4 programme) that was filmed from May to July 2005 and aired from 22 May to 30 June 2006. This year the trip was centred on Mediterranean countries. Brendan returned as the tour guide, the narrator was Andy Love and the registration number plate was T100 MTT. Paul Donald was the driver for the first time.

== Contestants ==
Couple were aboard the coach	Couple got yellow carded	Couple received a prize
Couple were immune from votes	Couple got red carded	Couple weren't present at the vote
Couple left the coach	Couple banned from voting	Vote was cancelled
Couple were removed from the coach

Couple	Relationship	Trip Duration (Days)																													
Couple	Relationship	1	2	3	4	5	6	7	8	9	10	11	12	13	14	15	16	17	18	19	20	21	22	23	24	25	26	27	28	29	30
Joy and Paul (replaced Alan and Lorenzo)	Husband and wife	Not on coach																													Winners
Ann and Doris (replaced Alan and Eileen)	Mother and daughter	Not on coach																									Yellow card				Second
Jamie and Mary (replaced Becky and Jess)	Partners	Not on coach																													Second
Matt and Scott (replaced Dave and Di)	Friends	Not on coach																											Yellow card		Second
Dennis and Jackie (replaced Andrea and Ivor)	Husband and wife	Not on coach																													Second
Paul and Tim (replaced Joe and Marlon)	Friends	Not on coach																								Yellow card					Third
John and Kelly (replaced Chandra and Vina)	Partners	Not on coach																										Yellow card		Walked 3rd	
Chandra and Vina (replaced Jackson and Victoria)	Husband and wife	Not on coach																						Yellow card	Red card	Eliminated 10th					
Andrea and Ivor (replaced Bill and Rae)	Partners	Not on coach																					Yellow card	Red card	Removed 3rd						
Becky and Jess (replaced Clare and Kat)	Friends	Not on coach																						Walked 2nd							
Jackson and Victoria (replaced John and Kerrie)	Work Colleagues, Best Friends	Not on coach																			Yellow card	Red card	Removed 2nd								
Dave and Di (replaced Jacky and Phil)	Husband and wife	Not on coach																	Yellow card	Red card	Eliminated 9th										
Joe and Marlon (replaced Betty and Connie)	Father and son	Not on coach															Yellow card	Red card	Eliminated 8th												
John and Kerrie (original 7)	Work Colleagues and Friends							Yellow card								Red card	Eliminated 7th														
Alan and Lorenzo (original 7)	Barbers and Friends														Red card	Removed 1st															
Clare and Kat (original 7)	Waitresses and Friends												Yellow card	Red card	Eliminated 6th																
Alan and Eileen (original 7)	Husband and wife										Yellow card	Red card	Eliminated 5th																		
Bill and Rae (replaced Heidi and Paul)	Husband and wife	Not on coach							Yellow card	Red card	Eliminated 4th																				
Jacky and Phil (replaced Irene and John)	Husband and wife	Not on coach					Yellow card	Red card	Eliminated 3rd																						
Betty and Connie (original 7)	Friends		Yellow card			Red card	Eliminated 2nd																								
Heidi and Paul (original 7)	Partners	Yellow card		Red card	Eliminated 1st																										
Irene and John (original 7)	Husband and wife				Walked 1st																										

== Voting history ==
Couple won the series	Couple were yellow carded	Couple were removed from the coach	Vote was cancelled
Couple were runners up	Couple were red carded	Couple were immune from votes	Couple left the coach
Couple were third	Couple didn't vote	Couple received a prize	Couple banned from voting

	Day																													
	1	2	3	4	5	6	7	8	9	10	11	12	13	14	15	16	17	18	19	20	21	22	23	24	25	26	27	28	29	30
Joy Paul	Not on coach														John; Kerrie	Joe; Marlon	Joe; Marlon	Jackson; Victoria	Jackson; Victoria	Jackson; Victoria	Cancelled	Andrea; Ivor	Chandra; Vina	Chandra; Vina	Paul; Tim	Dennis; Jackie	John; Kelly	Matt; Scott	Ann; Doris	Winners; 2 votes
Ann Doris	Not on coach												Clare; Kat	Dave; Di	John; Kerrie	Joe; Marlon	Joe; Marlon	Jackson; Victoria	Banned	Jackson; Victoria	Cancelled	Andrea; Ivor	Chandra; Vina	Chandra; Vina	Matt; Scott	Dennis; Jackie	John; Kelly	Matt; Scott	Joy; Paul	Second; 1 vote
Jamie Mary	Not on coach																						Paul; Tim	Matt; Scott	Paul; Tim	Ann; Doris	John; Kelly	Matt; Scott	Matt; Scott	Second; 1 vote
Matt Scott	Not on coach																						Chandra; Vina	Chandra; Vina	Paul; Tim	Ann; Doris	Ann; Doris	Jamie; Mary	Dennis; Jackie	Second; 1 vote
Dennis Jackie	Not on coach																							Paul; Tim	Paul; Tim	Ann; Doris	John; Kelly	Matt; Scott	Jamie; Mary	Second; 1 vote
Paul Tim	Not on coach																	Dave; Di	Dave; Di	Jackson; Victoria	Cancelled	Andrea; Ivor	Chandra; Vina	Chandra; Vina	Dennis; Jackie	Ann; Doris	John; Kelly	Matt; Scott	Joy; Paul	Third; 0 votes
John Kelly	Not on coach																								N/A	Jamie; Mary	Paul; Joy	Left	Walked (beginning of Day 28)	
Chandra Vina	Not on coach																				Cancelled	Andrea; Ivor	Paul; Tim	Joy; Paul	Red Carded (Day 24)					
Andrea Ivor	Not on coach										Alan; Eileen	Clare; Kat	Clare; Kat	Dave; Di	John; Kerrie	Joe; Marlon	Joe; Marlon	Dave; Di	Dave; Di	Jackson; Victoria	Cancelled	Paul; Tim	Removed	Removed (Day 23)						
Jess Becky	Not on coach															Dave; Di	Joe; Marlon	Dave; Di	Dave; Di	Jackson; Victoria	Cancelled	Left	Walked (beginning of Day 22)							
Jackson Victoria	Not on coach																Ann; Doris	Becky; Jess	Becky; Jess	Paul; Tim	Removed	Removed (Day 21)								
Dave Di	Not on coach								Alan; Lorenzo	Alan; Eileen	Alan; Eileen	Clare; Kat	Clare; Kat	Ann; Doris	John; Kerrie	Andrea; Ivor	Joe; Marlon	Becky; Jess	Paul; Tim	Red Carded (Day 19)										
Joe Marlon	Not on coach					N/A	Bill; Rae	Bill; Rae	Bill; Rae	Alan; Eileen	Alan; Eileen	Clare; Kat	Clare; Kat	John; Kerrie	John; Kerrie	Andrea; Ivor	Andrea; Ivor	Red Carded (Day 17)												
John Kerrie	Heidi; Paul	Betty; Connie	Heidi; Paul	Alan; Eileen	Betty; Connie	Jacky; Phil	Jacky; Phil	Bill; Rae	Alan; Lorenzo	Dave; Di	Alan; Eileen	Joe; Marlon	Dave; Di	Dave; Di	Andrea; Ivor	Red Carded (Day 15)														
Alan Lorenzo	Heidi; Paul	Betty; Connie	Heidi; Paul	Alan; Eileen	Betty; Connie	Bill; Rae	Jacky; Phil	Bill; Rae	Bill; Rae	Dave; Di	Alan; Eileen	Dave; Di	Dave; Di	Removed	Removed (Day 14)															
Clare Kat	Heidi; Paul	Betty; Connie	Heidi; Paul	Alan; Eileen	Betty; Connie	Jacky; Phil	Jacky; Phil	Bill; Rae	Bill; Rae	Joe; Marlon	Joe; Marlon	Dave; Di	Dave; Di	Red Carded (Day 13)																
Alan Eileen	Betty; Connie	Alan; Lorenzo	Clare; Kat	Betty; Connie	Betty; Connie	Jacky; Phil	Jacky; Phil	Bill; Rae	Joe; Marlon	Joe; Marlon	Dave; Di	Red Carded (Day 11)																		
Bill Rae	Not on coach				Alan; Lorenzo	Alan; Eileen	Clare; Kat	Joe; Marlon	Alan; Eileen	Red Carded (Day 9)																				
Phil Jacky	Not on coach				Lorenzo; Alan	John; Kerrie	Clare; Kat	Red Carded (Day 7)																						
Connie Betty	Alan; Lorenzo	Alan; Eileen	Alan; Lorenzo	Alan; Eileen	Clare; Kat	Red Carded (Day 5)																								
Heidi Paul	Alan; Lorenzo	Clare; Kat	John; Kerrie	Red Carded (Day 3)																										
Irene John	Betty; Connie	Alan; Lorenzo	Left	Walked (Day 3)																										
Notes	None						^{1}	None						^{2}	None				^{3}	None	^{4} ^{5}	None	^{6}	None						
Walked	None		Irene; John	None																		Becky; Jess	None					John; Kelly	None	
Removed	None													Alan; Lorenzo	None						Jackson; Victoria	None	Andrea; Ivor	None						
Timekeeping	None						John; Kerrie	None						Alan; Lorenzo	None															
Voted Off	Heidi; Paul; 3 votes	Betty; Connie; 3 votes	Heidi; Paul; 3 votes	None	Betty; Connie; 4 votes	Jacky; Phil; 3 votes	Jacky; Phil; 4 votes	Bill; Rae; 5 votes	Bill; Rae; 3 votes	Alan; Eileen; 2 votes	Alan; Eileen; 5 votes	Clare; Kat; 3 votes	Clare; Kat; 4 votes	None	John; Kerrie; 5 votes	Joe; Marlon; 3 votes	Joe; Marlon; 5 votes	Dave; Di; 3 votes	Dave; Di; 3 votes	Jackson; Victoria; 5 votes	None	Andrea; Ivor; 4 votes	Chandra; Vina; 4 votes	Chandra; Vina; 4 votes	Paul; Tim; 4 votes	Ann; Doris; 4 votes	John; Kelly; 5 votes	Matt; Scott; 5 votes	None	

=== Notes ===
^1 John and Kerrie were yellow-carded without being voted off on the beginning of day 7 for timekeeping issues due to late night drinking, for example if timekeeping issues continue they would have been removed with a second yellow card and a red card on following days.

^2 Alan and Lorenzo were removed with a red card on Day 14 because of the pair not bothering to get out of bed in the morning. The pair had a hangover because they were partying with recent leavers Kat and Clare the night before and felt it was time to walk coinciding with the departure of their friends. Brendan had no choice but to give the pair a red card and to leave them with a £374 hotel bill amid complaints from other guests regarding the previous night's revelry. The stationary traffic due to an accident also caused the group to either miss out on or cancel the morning activity.

^3 Doris & Ann were banned from voting, but they were eligible to being voted for, due to them coming last in the quiz and then didn't receive any votes on that day but Ivor & Andrea were immune from any votes, but they could vote, due to them winning the quiz.

^4 The afternoon activity and votes were cancelled due to the news of the 7 July 2005 London bombings. Chandra & Vina, who would've been immune had the vote taken place, would be immune in the next day's vote. Becky & Jess decided to leave the coach in the aftermath.

^5 Victoria and Jackson were removed with a red card on Day 21 for not wanting to continue on the tour. The pair also had a hangover throughout the previous evening.

^6 Ivor and Andrea were removed with a red card on Day 23 for overtaking Day 22's vote and refusing to continue into the final day.

== The Trip Day-by-Day ==
Day	Location	Activity	
Day	Location	Morning	Afternoon
1	Madrid	Open top bus tour	Football Stadium
2	Segovia	Cooking lesson	Tour of the Alcázar of Segovia
3	Salamanca	Pottery class	Spanish lesson
4	Monfortinho	Spa treatments	
5	Tomar		
6	Lisbon	Oceanarium	Archery
7	Faro	Golf	Water Park
8	Lagos	Boat trip	
9	Seville		
10	Jerez	Bee keeping	Sherry tasting
11	Gibraltar		
12	Morocco		
13	Marbella & Mijas	Water sports	
14	Granada	CANCELLED	Arab Baths
15	Almeria		
16	Benidorm	Water Skiing	
17	Ibiza	DJ Mixing	Yoga lesson
18	Tarragona	Theme park	
19	Perpignan	Beach rugby	
20	Montpellier & Sète	Cooking lesson	
21	Marseille	Horse riding	CANCELLED
22	Sainte-Maxime		
23	Antibes	Perfumery	
24	Portofino		
25	Lucca	Tour Around Pinocchio Park	
26	Maranello		
27	Modena	Vinegar farm	Opera lesson
28	Verona		
29	Milan	Shopping	
30	The coach makes its way back to the UK taking a look back at all the fantastic destinations and some of the more colourful characters who have appeared on the trip.		
