= Debra Bourne =

British communications expert

Debra Bourne MBE
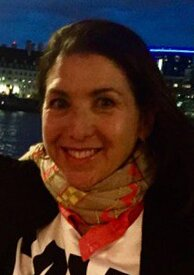
- Bourne in 2016
- Born: Debra Lysette Bourne MBE; London, UK
- Education: Institute of Psychosynthesis Middlesex University (1992–1995)
- Occupations: Communications Expert, Brand Consultant and Campaigner
- Known for: Co-Founder of All Walks Beyond The Catwalk
- Spouse: David Rosen
- Children: Johnny Bourne-Rosen
- Awards: Sheila McKechnie Award for Creating Change Within Business (2016)
- Website: debra-bourne.com

Debra Lysette Bourne MBE is a British communications expert, brand consultant and advocate for diversity in fashion. She co-founded All Walks Beyond The Catwalk, is a brand consultant, a former board director at Lynne Franks PR and Executive Fashion Editor at Arena Magazine and Arena Homme Plus.

== Personal life ==
Bourne has a son, Johnny, and is married to David Rosen, senior partner and self-proclaimed 'building detective' for London property behemoth Pilcher Hershman.

In 2017, Bourne was appointed a Member of the Order of the British Empire (MBE) in the New Year Honours for services to diversity in the fashion industry.

== Lynne Franks PR ==
At the age of 20, Bourne started working as an intern for leading consumer PR consultancy Lynne Franks (the inspiration behind Absolutely Fabulous character, Edwina) before becoming a board director at the age of 27. Clients included Jean Paul Gaultier, Swatch, Knickerbox, Pepe Jeans, Ghost, John Richmond, and Procter & Gamble.

== All Walks Beyond The Catwalk ==
Launched during London Fashion Week in May 2009, when Susan Ringwood, the then chief executive of Beat, asked:

"Was it possible to show fashion on a range of inspiring bodies?"

It was the mix of Bourne's experience in the fashion industry and her longstanding commitment to psychotherapy training that lead her towards developing the idea for All Walks with Caryn Franklin and Erin O'Connor as a campaign vehicle to inspire and empower change in the fashion industry.

Before fashion and diversity became hot topics for big business and consumers alike, All Walks shared the vision to encourage the shift towards a more enlightened position, through highlighting the responsibility that the fashion industry had in recognising the psychological impact of its messaging upon the minds of young women and men.

Notable collaborators include William Tempest, Giles Deacon, Vivienne Westwood, Hannah Marshall, David Koma, Jade Parifitt, Mark Fast, Georgia Hardinge, Rankin and i-D magazine.

Bourne was appointed Member of the Order of the British Empire (MBE) in the 2017 New Year Honours for services to diversity in the fashion industry.
