= All Walks Beyond the Catwalk =

British fashion organisation

All Walks Beyond The Catwalk
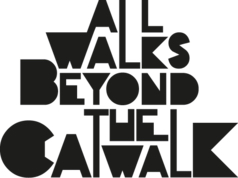
- The All Walks Beyond The Catwalk logo.
- Industry: Fashion
- Founded: 1 May 2009; 17 years ago London, U.K
- Founders: Caryn Franklin, Debra Bourne and Erin O’Connor
- Website: allwalks.org

All Walks Beyond The Catwalk is an initiative founded by Caryn Franklin, Debra Bourne and Erin O’Connor in 2009 to challenge what it considers the fashion industry's dependence on unachievable and limited body and beauty ideals. It has contributed to a variety of parliamentary campaigns, and has presented its education program at 33 colleges and universities.

== Origin ==
All Walks Beyond The Catwalk launched during London Fashion Week in May 2009, when Susan Ringwood, the then Chief Executive of Beat, asked:"Was it possible to show fashion on a range of inspiring bodies?"

Before fashion and diversity became prominent topics of discussion for businesses and consumers, Franklin, Bourne and O'Connor formed the All Walks initiative to campaign for the fashion industry to recognise the psychological impact of its messaging on the minds of young women and men, and to take more responsibility for the consequences.

Notable collaborators with the organization include William Tempest, Hannah Marshall, David Koma, Mark Fast, Georgia Hardinge, Rankin and i-D magazine.

== Campaigns ==
All Walks Beyond The Catwalk have created a number of press campaigns to highlight the impact of imagery in the fashion industry. It has been featured in national and international news and current affairs programmes, and in lifestyle print media.

In 2009, eight new designers—William Tempest, Hannah Marshall, David Koma, Alexandra Groover, Avsh Alom Gur, Cooperative Designs, Mark Fast and Georgia Hardinge—were selected by a panel of industry experts to create a look representative of their Spring/Summer 2010 collections, focusing on diversity. Shot by award-winning photographer Kayt Jones, and featured in the Pre-fall 09 issue of i-D magazine, the images provided the context for the All Walks Beyond the Catwalk launch party at Somerset House, sponsored by Marks and Spencer, on the opening night of London Fashion Week 2009. Among the guests were the then-Prime Minister's wife Sarah Brown.

In 2010, photographers Alice Hale and Matt Rittson set up a live photo booth throughout London Fashion Week to capture the portraits of diverse and individual personalities. One hundred and sixty people were photographed and the resultant images formed a living exhibition, entitled Everybody Counts.

Launched in association with i-D Magazine, DiversityNow! is an award given to young people from across 33 colleges in the UK since 2013. It is open to any student in full-time or part-time education on any fashion, textiles, jewellery & accessory, graphic design, photography, journalism or illustration course, and is intended to encourage young creative people to consider diversity within their work.

Another campaign, Snapped, highlights the relationship between fashion and the way we view our identity. Fashion photographer Rankin photographed a range of models that were later exhibited at the National Portrait Gallery.

== Education ==
All Walks Beyond The Catwalk have engaged with 33 different colleges and universities, providing lectures across the UK aimed at inspiring undergraduates to change practice within their chosen field. Since launching in 2009, several colleges have changed their curriculum to include 'Diversity' as a module: Edinburgh College of Art, The Arts University College at Bournemouth, Nottingham Trent University, Ravensbourne, Portsmouth University and Toronto Metropolitan University in Toronto.

=== Diversity Network ===
In June 2011, All Walks created the Diversity Network in collaboration with Edinburgh College of Art. Launched in conjunction with government minister Lynne Featherstone, it promotes "emotionally considerate" design and practice through educational methods and research. The course is led by Director Mal Burkinshaw.

== Advocacy ==
All Walks Beyond The Catwalk have contributed to a variety of parliamentary campaigns and initiatives on how diversity and individuality in fashion can make an impact in the wider world. The organisation is part of the UK government expert advisory committee on body confidence, previously chaired by former Equalities Ministers Lynne Featherstone and Jo Swinson.

In 2012, All Walks collaborated with MP Caroline Nokes to create the first Body Confidence Awards from Parliament.

== See also ==
- Beat (charity)
- British Fashion Council
- Immodesty Blaize
- Kelly Knox
- Minister for Women and Equalities
- Nick Knight
- Skunk Anansie
- We the People – Whitehouse.gov petition website
