= Celebrity Coach Trip series 5 =

Celebrity Coach Trip
- Season 5
- No. of days: 10
- Winners: Francis Boulle & Sarah Keyworth
- Runner-up: Harry Reid & James Hill

Release
- Original network: E4
- Original release: 7 October – 18 October 2019

Series chronology
- ← Previous; Series 4 Next → Series 6

Celebrity Coach Trip 5 is the fifth series of Celebrity Coach Trip in the United Kingdom. The series began airing on E4 on 7 October 2019 for 10 episodes and concluded on 18 October 2019. Francis Boulle & Sarah Keyworth won the series.

== Contestants ==
Couple were aboard the coach	Couple got yellow carded	Couple won a prize at the vote
Couple were immune from votes	Couple got red carded	Couple refused to vote
Couple left the coach	Couple banned from voting	Couple were not present at the vote

Couple	Trip duration (days)									
Couple	1	2	3	4	5	6	7	8	9	10
Cleopatra & Yonah (original 6)		Yellow card			Red card	Eliminated 1st on 11 October 2019				
Arron & Kate (original 6)					Yellow card		Red card	Eliminated 2nd on 15 October 2019		
Amelle & H (replaced Cleopatra & Yonah)	Not on Coach							Red card	Eliminated 3rd on 16 October 2019	
Arg & Diags	Not on Coach					Yellow card			Red card	Eliminated 4th on 17 October 2019
Brandi & Hayley (replaced Amelle & H)	Not on Coach									Third on 18 October 2019
Harvey & Megaman (replaced Arron & Kate)	Not on Coach									Third on 18 October 2019
Scott & Vicky (original 6)						Yellow card				Third on 18 October 2019
Alexandra & Georgia (original 6)				Yellow card						Third on 18 October 2019
Harry & James (original 6)			Yellow card							Second on 18 October 2019
Francis & Sarah (original 6)	Yellow card									Winners on 18 October 2019

== Voting history ==
Couple won the series	Couple were yellow carded	Couple were not present at the vote
Couple were runners up	Couple were red carded	Couple won a prize at the vote
Couple were third	Couple were immune from votes	Couple refused to vote
Couple were fourth	Couple left the coach

	Day										
	1	2	3	4	5	6	7	8	9	10	
Francis Sarah	Harry; James	Arron; Kate	Scott; Vicky	Alexandra; Georgia	Scott; Vicky	Scott; Vicky	Arron; Kate	Amelle; H	Alexandra; Georgia	Harry; James	Winners (4 votes)
Harry James	Francis; Sarah	Arron; Kate	Arron; Kate	Scott; Vicky	Cleopatra; Yonah	Arg; Diags	Arron; Kate	Amelle; H	Arg; Diags	Francis; Sarah	Second (2 votes)
Alexandra Georgia	Francis; Sarah	Cleopatra; Yonah	Harry; James	Scott; Vicky	Cleopatra; Yonah	Arg; Diags	Francis; Sarah	Amelle; H	Francis; Sarah	Francis; Sarah	Third (0 votes)
Scott Vicky	Cleopatra; Yonah	Cleopatra; Yonah	Harry; James	Alexandra; Georgia	Francis; Sarah	Arg; Diags	Alexandra; Georgia	Amelle; H	Francis; Sarah	Francis; Sarah	Third (0 votes)
Harvey Megaman	Not on Coach							Scott; Vicky	Harry; James	Francis; Sarah	Third (0 votes)
Brandi Hayley	Not on Coach								Arg; Diags	Harry; James	Third (0 votes)
Arg Diags	Not on Coach			Arron; Kate	Cleopatra; Yonah	Scott; Vicky	Arron; Kate	Amelle; H	Banned	Red Carded (Day 9)	
Amelle H	Not on Coach					Arg; Diags	Harry; James	Scott; Vicky	Red Carded (Day 8)		
Arron Kate	Harry; James	Cleopatra; Yonah	Francis; Sarah	Cleopatra; Yonah	Cleopatra; Yonah	Scott; Vicky	Francis; Sarah	Red Carded (Day 7)			
Cleopatra Yonah	Francis; Sarah	Scott; Vicky	Arron; Kate	Alexandra; Georgia	Arron; Kate	Red Carded (Day 5)					
Notes	None				^{1}	^{2}	None	^{3}	^{4}	None	
Voted Off	Francis; Sarah; 3 votes	Cleopatra; Yonah; 3 votes	Harry; James; 2 votes	Alexandra; Georgia; 3 votes	Cleopatra; Yonah; 4 votes	Arg; Diags; 4 votes	Arron; Kate; 3 votes	Amelle; H 5 votes	Arg; Diags; 3 votes	None	
Voted Off	Francis; Sarah; 3 votes	Cleopatra; Yonah; 3 votes	Harry; James; 2 votes	Alexandra; Georgia; 3 votes	Arron; Kate; Chosen by Cleopatra & Yonah	Scott; Vicky; 3 votes	Arron; Kate; 3 votes	Amelle; H 5 votes	Arg; Diags; 3 votes	None	

=== Notes ===
^1 On Day 5, Brendan announced that the couple with the most votes would receive an instant red card, as well as this, that couple would also choose another couple to receive a yellow card.

^2 On Day 6, Brendan announced that the two couples with the most votes would receive yellow cards.

^3 On Day 8, Brendan announced that from now on, the couple with the most votes would receive an instant red card.

^4 On Day 9, Harry & James were told that their vote would count for two votes, as a result of them winning the morning activity.

== The trip by day ==
Day	Location	Activity	
Day	Location	Morning	Afternoon
1	Pisa	Leaning Tower of Pisa clay modeling	Jet surfing
2	Massa	Acro-gymnastics	Paintballing
3	Sestri Levante	Paddleboarding	Traditional Italian cooking class
4	Genoa	Farm	Opera singing
5	Savona	Animal yoga	Sea kayak games
6	Albenga	Drift go-karting	Rock climbing
7	Sanremo	Baseball	Treasure hunt
8	Nice	Beach boot camp	Flyboarding
9	Cannes	Mime class	Sea bobbing
10	Fréjus	Water jousting	Aeroplane ride
