= RI:SE =

British breakfast TV show for Channel 4 (2002–2003)

- Genre: Breakfast television
- Presented by: Dougie Anderson; Tom Binns; Liz Bonnin; Henry Bonsu; Edith Bowman; Mark Durden-Smith; Kirsty Gallacher; Mel Giedroyc; Kate Lawler; Iain Lee; Colin Murray; Sue Perkins; Chris Rogers; Zora Suleman
- Country of origin: United Kingdom
- Original language: English
- No. of series: 2

Production
- Running time: 2hr 15 mins
- Production companies: BSkyB; Princess Productions

Original release
- Network: Channel 4
- Release: 29 April 2002 – 19 December 2003

Related
- The Big Breakfast; Morning Glory

RI:SE is a breakfast television show made by Princess Productions in collaboration with BSkyB for Channel 4 in the United Kingdom. It was scheduled to replace The Big Breakfast after declining ratings. It launched on 29 April 2002. The programme was broadcast nationally in the UK between 06:55 and 09:00 in the morning. It ended on 19 December 2003.

== History ==
Original presenters included Mark Durden-Smith, Colin Murray, Kirsty Gallacher, Edith Bowman, Tom Binns, Chris Rogers, Liz Bonnin and Henry Bonsu.

The show launched on 29 April 2002 with a voiceover announcing "now on 4 a brand new way to wake up on Channel 4". There were no titles, just music in a high-tech studio with large video screens and a devoted news wall. Chris Rogers presented the top 6 stories before handing over to Kirsty Gallacher for the sport.

A pilot episode was filmed in real time with Chris Moyles. During one of the commercial breaks, Moyles was asked by a woman from the production company what he thought of the show and he said that it was "just a bit boring" but understood it was what the production company wanted for the show.

Its viewing figures did not meet initial expectations, and a variety of format changes were made to try to boost ratings. The programme began to model itself on The Big Breakfast, with the presenters sitting as a couple in front of French windows, games, competitions, crew involvement and outside broadcasts with the likes of Mel Giedroyc and Sue Perkins drafted in. This was despite ratings increasing during its coverage of Big Brother 4 where over 500,000 tuned in.

Its first run underwent many presenting changes and producer departures as there was little interest in the show. Fans of The Big Breakfast, who had reignited their interest in the show in 2002 when it returned to form with the arrival of Lisa Rogers for the last 3 months, disliked the new show over its opening comments of there not been any whooping crew members where the previous breakfast incumbent seemed to thrive upon.

Many criticised the show for its lack of titles, over reliance on a news ticker and six pack of news and unfunny features like "search for a nobody", "strap me down" and "lip service". The news ticker would often show stories on a rolling basis alternating between news, sport, weather and travel. Presenters would share items between them and have specialisms Chris with news, Edith with entertainment etc. The show was trounced in the ratings by GMTV. Sebastian Scott, the executive producer who was present at the launch, said that the expectation was for viewers to not watch it at length but to watch it in small increments.

Various presenter changes occurred after it was announced that Mark Durden Smith, Colin Murray, Liz Bonnin, Chris Rogers and Kirsty Gallacher would leave.

This happened in various stages throughout the latter part of 2002. The final episode of the year saw a reworking of Shakin' Stevens Merry Christmas Everyone with Girls Aloud and Popstars The Rivals competitors and celebrities singing on the video. The blinking clock effect was accompanied by a snowflake and a Christmas theme.

The show’s music changed on 1 October with the clock changing from white to yellow and the music soundtrack sounding more enlivened and more uplifting.

=== Relaunch ===
The show was relaunched on 20 January 2003 with presenters Iain Lee and Edith Bowman. Mel and Sue took over the final half-hour from 8:30. Bowman was later replaced by 2002 Big Brother winner, Kate Lawler. Zora Suleman provided half-hourly news updates. Dougie Anderson was a stand-in presenter and also often reported from a record shop near the studio, as well as helping with the daily television review.

During the Iraq War the show was shortened to allow for Channel 4 News coverage to be shown. In the Summer of 2003, Mel and Sue left RI:SE and the show was solely presented by Iain, Kate and Dougie.

RI:SE gave extensive coverage to reality TV formats including Big Brother, Pop Idol and The Salon. In Summer 2003, RI:SE launched a contest for a member of the public to become the "reality correspondent", a competition won by "Kitty", who remained with the show until the final episode.

Big Brother monitor "James" joined Iain Lee and Kate Lawler, after winning a competition to give updates on events in the house and conducting live interviews with the latest evictees. One episode featured PJ who joined Iain and Kate after the first housemate - Anouska - was evicted from the Big Brother 4 house. James also accompanied Kitty on the final show.

== Production ==
Originally broadcast from Sky's campus in Isleworth, RI:SE moved to Whiteley's Shopping Centre in Bayswater, west London as part of the January 2003 relaunch - the more central location was intended to make it easier to book guests.

== Controversy ==
The Independent Television Commission condemned the show for an episode aired in December 2002 in which satirical jokes were made about Jesus Christ.

== Cancellation ==
On 19 September 2003, the show was axed due to its continuous rating failures.

The last episode was shown on 19 December 2003, and had the most popular guests from the previous months including Jon Tickle and Shaun Dooley. The show ended with a giant 'pile on' which had been organised by Iain and Kate during the weeks before the last episode. Despite a small fan base and a loyal number of viewers tuning in, Channel 4 did not feel it was viable to continue. In its run the show featured the entertainment report, Textocution where viewers could vote off a person they hated with the remaining participant winning a holiday. This was along with the paper review and text to win where a true or false question was posed.

Since then, the show's morning slot has been taken up by reruns of sitcoms such as Friends, Everybody Loves Raymond and Frasier. In January 2006, Channel 4 launched a new live show since RI:SE, called Morning Glory, which was presented by Dermot O'Leary. It broadcast between 08:30 and 09:00, Monday to Friday morning for a three-week spell during Channel 4's 2006 run of Celebrity Big Brother 4, but was not renewed due to poor viewing figures. From 2006, Freshly Squeezed, a music show was broadcast between 07:00 and 07:30 in the morning.

The Bayswater studio - owned by Princess Productions - was later used to broadcast The Wright Stuff on Channel 5.

In a December 2019 Twitch broadcast, former presenter Iain Lee noted that on one occasion the show recorded 0 viewers.
