= The Clothes Show =

- Genre: Factual
- Created by: Jeff Banks
- Starring: Louise Redknapp; Caryn Franklin; Brendan Courtney
- Theme music composer: Five Star (series 1) Pet Shop Boys (series 2 onwards)
- Opening theme: "Find the Time" (Shep Pettibone remix) (season 1) "In the Night (Arthur Baker remix)" (season 2 onwards)
- Country of origin: United Kingdom
- Original language: English

Production
- Executive producer: Roger Casstles
- Production company: BBC Birmingham

Original release
- Network: BBC1
- Release: 13 October 1986 – 13 April 1998

The Clothes Show is a British television show about fashion that was broadcast on BBC One from 1986 to 1998, and from 2006 to 2009 on UKTV Style and Really. At its height, The Clothes Show had around 9 million viewers each Sunday. It also spawned a live event that outlived the TV show until 2017.

== BBC series (1986–1998) ==
The Clothes Show was first broadcast on 13 October 1986, with Breakfast Time's Selina Scott and designer Jeff Banks as its first hosts. The show combined reports from the catwalks with items on how to achieve a catwalk-type look on a reasonable budget. Selina Scott and Jeff Banks were later joined by Caryn Franklin (a former Fashion Editor and co-Editor of international style magazine i-D), who took over as Banks' main co-host after Scott left.

In 1989, the annual Clothes Show Live event was launched at Birmingham's National Exhibition Centre, and later a magazine was produced to accompany the programme. The programme continued on the BBC until April 1998, with other presenters over the years including Margherita Taylor, Tim Vincent, Richard Jobson and Brenda Emmanus. Series producers included Collette Foster and Jane Lomas, who had been a presenter on the earliest shows. The Clothes Show Live event continued to be held annually in Birmingham at the beginning of each December until 2016, and was last held in Liverpool in July 2017.

=== Theme tune ===
The show's original theme music in 1986 was the Shep Pettibone remix of Five Star's then-recent hit "Find the Time". From 1987, the theme tune was an excerpt from Arthur Baker's remix of the Pet Shop Boys' song "In The Night" which can be found on the 1986 Disco album. The original version of the song was on the b-side of the 1985 single "Opportunities (Let's Make Lots of Money)".

In 1995, Pet Shop Boys were asked by the BBC to remix the theme tune for a revamped version of the show. This new version, which was entirely instrumental, appeared as a A-side and B-side to the 1996 single "Before" and can now be found on the 2001 reissue of their 1996 album Bilingual and on their Format b-side compilation album.

Saint Etienne were also asked to produce a theme tune for the show, but it was turned down.

== UKTV Style/Really series (2006–2009) ==
On 7 August 2006, The Sun reported that The Clothes Show was to be resurrected after eight years and would be shown on UKTV Style, hosted by Louise Redknapp, Caryn Franklin and Brendan Courtney. The programme moved from UKTV Style to a new channel called Really in 2009.

== YouTube series (2013) ==
The organisers of the Clothes Show Live event brought the show back as "Clothes Show TV" in 2013. The organisation continued to publish short videos on YouTube until 2018.
