= Jeff Banks =

Welsh designer (born 1943)

Jeff Banks CBE
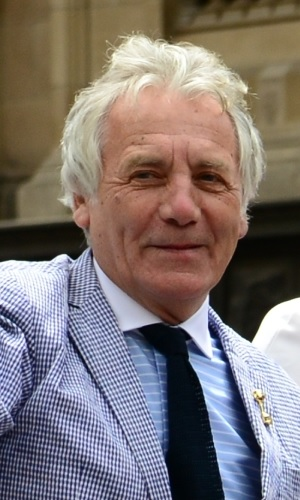
- Banks in 2013
- Born: Jeffrey Tatham-Banks; 17 March 1943 (age 83); Ebbw Vale, Wales
- Occupation: Fashion designer
- Label: Jeff Banks
- Spouses: Sandie Shaw (m. 1968; div. 1978); Sue Mann
- Children: 1

Jeff Banks (born Jeffrey Tatham-Banks, 17 March 1943) is a Welsh fashion designer of men's and women's clothing, jewellery, and home furnishings. Born in Ebbw Vale, Wales, Banks co-founded the fashion chain Warehouse in the late 1970s. He later created and presented the television programme The Clothes Show, broadcast on BBC One from 1986 to 2000.

== Biography ==
Banks was born in the Welsh town of Ebbw Vale, in Blaenau Gwent. His father, a sheet metal worker, left Banks' mother when Banks was eight, and she subsequently decided to move to London.

He was offered a scholarship at independent public school St Dunstan's College, in Catford, south London, but his mother could not afford the uniform. He went to Brockley County Grammar School instead, but still without a uniform. To pay for it he set up his own business buying paraffin at the bottom of a hill, then pushing it up in an old pram, and selling it for a penny more at the top of the hill. By 13 he was employing a man to drive a lorry-based tanker, and at 15 he sold the business.

Encouraged by a teacher to study art and become a painter, he realised his art skills were limited during his first year at London's Camberwell School of Art, and transferred to study interior design and latterly textiles at Saint Martin's School of Art, and then fashion at New York's Parsons The New School for Design.

Banks has honorary degrees from the University of Lancaster, University of East London, Northumbria University, University College for the Creative Arts, and the University of Westminster, and is a Doctor of Arts.

He was awarded the Minerva Medal by the Chartered Society of Designers in 1994 and was the Society's President from 2001 to 2003.

In 2009 Banks was appointed a Commander of the Most Excellent Order of the British Empire in the Queen's Birthday Honours.

== Career ==
In 1964, with money saved from the paraffin business and from his father mortgaging his own home, Banks opened the boutique Clobber in London, which carried his own designs along with other designers' work. It proved such a success that in 1969, he launched his own fashion label.

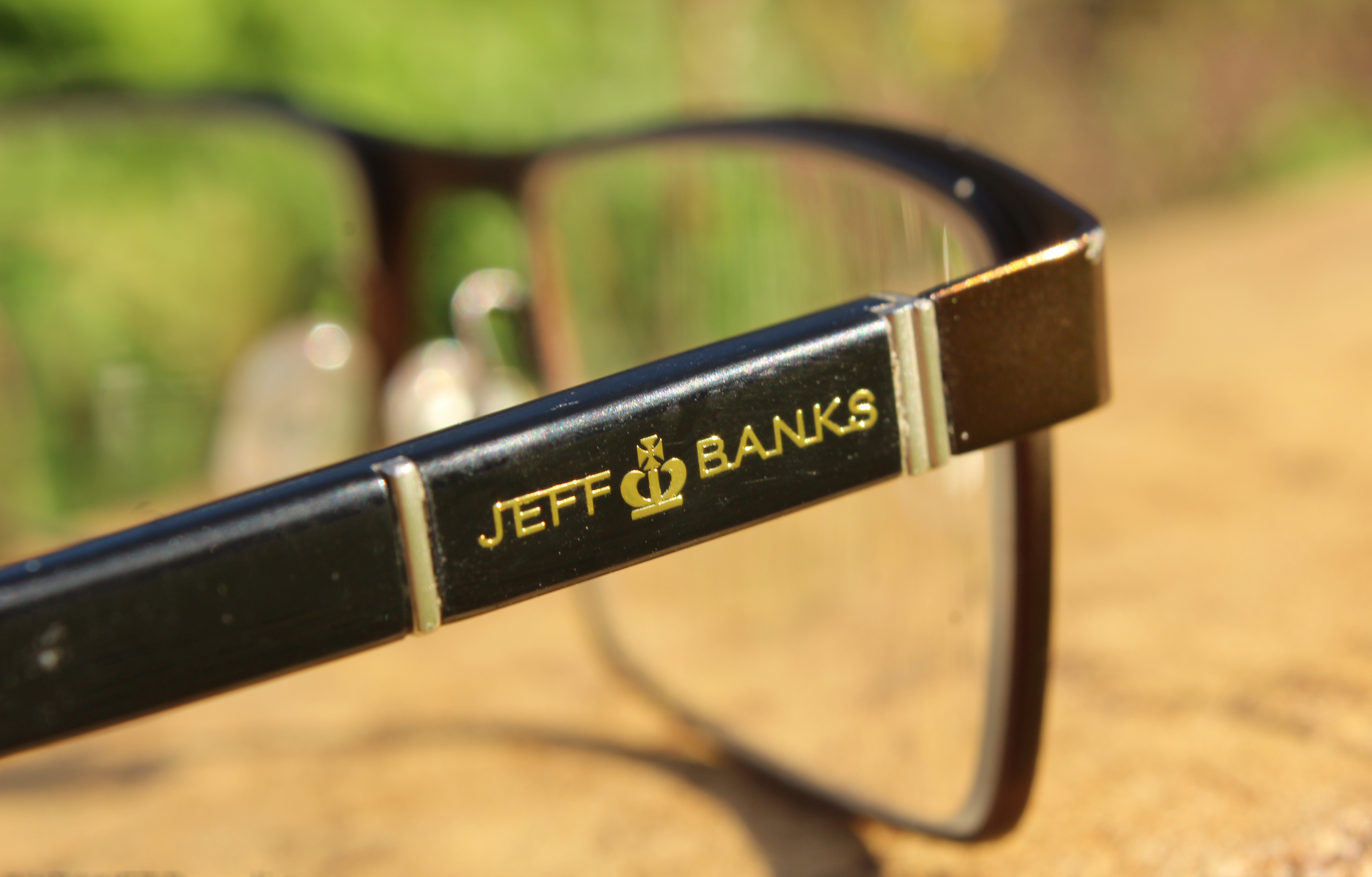
Jeff banks glasses, featuring the logo "Jeff Banks".

In 1975 he opened the first standalone Jeff Banks shop in London, as well as retail outlets in twenty-two department stores, including Harrods and Harvey Nichols.

In the late 1970s, he co-launched the fashion chain Warehouse, as well as continuing to work as a freelance designer. After it was taken over by retail chain Sears, he was sacked for being disruptive in board meetings – which he never regrets. In 1979 and 1981 Banks became British Designer of the Year, and in 1980 he was made "British Coat Designer of the Year". During the mid-to late 1980s, he designed a large proportion of the stage-clothes for musician Howard Jones.

Banks's standing as a commercial force in retail fashion led to his presenting over 320 episodes of The Clothes Show, the BBC's long-running fashion show, alongside Selina Scott and Caryn Franklin. The show's success in often gaining over 10 million viewers, led in 1989 to the first "Clothes Show Live" event at the NEC Birmingham, as well as the launch of the Clothes Show magazine.

Having been asked to create corporate design wear for many organisations Jeff Banks created his own corporate clothing company in 1996. Incorporatewear is now one of the largest companies in the United Kingdom producing corporate clothing. With partners Rob Pollock and Brian Lamb the company produces a wide range of clothing for various types of companies.

In 2000, he signed a deal to design clothes for the UK chain Sainsbury's. The installation of Jeff Banks stores within Sainsbury's outlets proved successful, but a dispute led to the early termination of his contract. The resulting lawsuit was resolved with Sainsbury's agreeing to pay a reported settlement of £1 million, plus a box of truffles every week.

In April 2007, Banks mocked Kate Moss's design range for Topshop, saying: "Can Kate sharpen a pencil, do an impression of a cow or draw a matchstick man? I would put money on it, though not very much. I'll bet [Kate Moss] just grabbed one of her many Prada bags, rifled through her wardrobe ... and turned up at Topshop's head office in Oxford Street for a quick hour's briefing with the in-house designers and buying staff."

Banks has continued to work as a designer with designs for the Guide Association, the England football team, and for London's 2012 Olympics bid, which were modelled at the launch by Bobby Charlton, Steve Redgrave and Denise Lewis. Banks continues to be heavily involved in corporate clothing and uniform. In May 2010 he offered to design the match-day 'walk-on' suits for the cash-strapped Portsmouth F.C. team for their FA Cup final appearance.

Banks's own fashion design influences are Hardy Amies, Giorgio Armani and Alice Temperley.

== Personal life ==
Banks has been married twice: firstly to the 1960s pop star Sandie Shaw (1968–1978), (with whom he has one daughter), and subsequently to Sue Mann, a model and film makeup artist.

Banks is a lifelong member of Catford Cycling Club, and a sponsor of their racing team CatfordCC Equipe/Banks, an amateur under-23 squad having British National 'Elite' team status.

Banks accepted the honorary position as Lord Lieutenant of the Ben Gibbons charitable Society of Farnham in March 2024.

In October 2025, Banks announced his support for Reform UK, describing its leader Nigel Farage as "a good man". In a Facebook post on 10th January 2026, Banks called for Farage, Rupert Lowe, Ben Habib and Tommy Robinson to "get round the table, settle your differences, stop throwing bricks and lawsuits at one another and come together for the collective good."
