= Rinat Brodach =

Israeli American fashion designer (b. 1984)

Rinat Shayna Brodach (Hebrew: רינת שיינה ברודך; born 1984) is an Israeli American fashion designer based in New York. She was a competitor on the first season of Making the Cut.

== Early life and education ==
Brodach was born in Beer Sheva, Israel. She attended the Academy of Art University in San Francisco and earned a BFA in Fashion Design. Her final thesis work earned her a scholarship to The Chambre Syndicale de la Couture Parisienne in Paris in 2010. She served in the Israeli Air Force.

== Career ==
Brodach moved to New York in 2012 and launched her own fashion line in 2014. As of 2018, her design focus is gender-free.

She dressed Billy Porter for the 24th Critics’ Choice Awards.

Brodach is a regular volunteer with Custom Collaborative, where she teaches women to sew.

== Making the Cut ==
Brodach was a contestant on Amazon’s Making the Cut. She won the fifth episode on streetwear which garnered a partnership with Puma and her clothing sold on Amazon. She was eliminated during the sixth episode.

== Awards ==
2020: Fashion Group International, All Gender Category finalist.
