= Morning Glory (TV programme) =

- Morning Glory logo
- Genre: Breakfast television
- Starring: Dermot O'Leary
- Country of origin: United Kingdom
- Original language: English

Production
- Running time: 30 minutes

Original release
- Network: Channel 4
- Release: 14 January – 28 January 2006

Related
- RI:SE; Freshly Squeezed

Morning Glory is the fourth breakfast television live programming attempt on Channel 4. It was presented by Dermot O'Leary every weekday morning from 8:30 to 9 am. Due to low ratings, despite having Big Brother's Little Breakfast as a lead-in show, it was not renewed.

The show followed on from Celebrity Big Brother 4, which ran in January 2006. The 4 Hero Les Fleurs theme was used to usher in the show. The set was predominantly red, with the show's logo displayed animated with birds flying around it. Its aim was to provide entertainment interviews and not news and weather like its previous incarnations.
