= Adele Roberts =

British radio DJ and television personality

- Born: 9 March 1979 (age 47); Southport, Merseyside, England
- Occupation: Radio presenter
- Years active: 2001–present
- Television: Big Brother; I'm a Celebrity...Get Me Out of Here!; Celebrity Coach Trip; Dancing on Ice

Adele Claire Roberts (born 9 March 1979) is a British broadcaster and reality TV personality and DJ, known for her work on BBC Radio 1. Her best known television appearances were in Big Brother, I'm a Celebrity...Get Me Out of Here!, Celebrity Coach Trip and Dancing on Ice.

== Early life ==
Roberts was born in Southport, Merseyside. She is the eldest of six siblings and is of mixed Barbadian and British descent. She was privately educated at Merchant Taylors' Girls' School in Crosby, Merseyside. Roberts studied pharmacology at University of Leeds, where she joined Leeds Student Radio presenting a weekly mix show.

== Big Brother ==
Roberts was a housemate in Big Brother 3. She came in seventh place after being evicted on 5 July 2002, seen by 7.1 million viewers.

Roberts later returned to the series in 2007, and participated in a task for Big Brother 8 alongside Alex Sibley.

== Career ==
=== Radio ===
In 2002, she landed her first radio job at Rock FM in Lancashire, presenting the weekly "Smooth Grooves Show", a self-produced urban specialist show airing on Friday, 10 pm – 2 am. Roberts also presented shows on The Hits Radio in Manchester. In 2006 she joined Galaxy in Leeds (now Capital). In 2012, she moved to BBC Radio 1Xtra. Roberts has stated that presenting on BBC 1Xtra had been a long-term aspiration and that she had attended a development event for the station (then under the working title 'Network X') in 2002 but had been too nervous to approach anybody and left immediately.

In 2015 it was announced that Roberts would be the new host of the BBC Radio 1 Early Breakfast show from 4:00-6:30am. Previous hosts of the same show include Greg James, Scott Mills, Chris Moyles and Dev.

She is also regular cover for The live lounge show.

In 2020, Roberts became the first black woman to host the BBC Radio 1 Breakfast show after the regular presenter Greg James failed to make it on air after attending The Brit Awards. It was later revealed that this was a planned stunt in which listeners had to locate the whereabouts of James with the help of on-air clues.

In November 2020, it was announced by the BBC that she would be the new host of Radio 1's Weekend Breakfast Show starting from January 2021 as part of a schedule shake up with current hosts of Weekend Breakfast moving to afternoons.

In August 2021, she provided cover for Trevor Nelson on The Rhythm Nation on BBC Radio 2. In December 2022, she returned to Radio 2 to host the Early Breakfast Show for 1 week.

On 21 June 2023, Roberts confirmed her departure from Radio 1. She had already presented her last programme for the network in May 2023.

=== Television ===
Roberts is a regular presenter for BBC Sport. In 2019 she joined the London Marathon coverage and commentary team alongside Gaby Logan, Steve Cram, Paula Radcliffe and Andrew Cotter.

In November 2019, it was announced that Roberts would be participating in the nineteenth series of I'm a Celebrity...Get Me Out of Here!. She was the first campmate to be voted off the show on 29 November. The show received complaints for the eviction as the voting app used to nominate camp mates had caused confusion due to ambiguous wording on the interface; because of this, no votes from the app were counted and only phone votes were used.

In January 2020, Roberts won the sixth series of Celebrity Coach Trip on E4 alongside her girlfriend, Kate Holderness.

In 2024, Roberts was a contestant on the sixteenth series of Dancing on Ice. She was paired with Mark Hanretty and the pair finished in third place.

== Personal life ==
=== Sport and fitness ===
Roberts is a keen runner and has completed three London Marathons, finishing all three races with a qualifying time for the following year. In 2017 she finished with a time of 03:36:31, in 2018 she finished with a time of 03:30:38 and in 2023 became the fastest woman to run the Marathon with a stoma bag, finishing the race in 3:30:22, achieving a Guinness World Record.

Roberts ran her first two marathons for the charity Heads Together and ran the 2023 marathon in aid of the Attitude Magazine Foundation.

In 2017 she received a surprise visit from the then Duke and Duchess of Cambridge who head the charity to wish her luck in her race. She is an avid supporter of Liverpool F.C.

Roberts took part in the Sport Relief charity netball match in 2019. She played on the winning team captained by Oti Mabuse.

=== LGBTQ rights ===
Roberts is bisexual and campaigns for LGBTQ rights. In 2013 she presented Coming Out, a documentary for Radio 1 and 1Xtra, sharing her own and others' personal coming out stories. She was nominated for 'Broadcaster of the Year' at the Diva Awards in 2017, 2018, 2019 and 2020 and the LGBT Awards in 2018 and 2020. On 24 June 2022 Roberts was named as role model of the year at British LGBT Awards in recognition of her openness about her cancer condition and subsequent treatment.

=== Health ===
On 24 October 2021, Roberts announced that she was undergoing treatment for bowel cancer, having been diagnosed earlier in the month. In January 2022, Roberts shared that a tumour had been removed, she had had chemotherapy treatment and a stoma, adding "I believe they've managed to remove all of the tumour, which is great news." On 27 June 2022, Roberts announced that she had been given the all-clear and was now "cancer free".
