= Wanderlust (Irish TV series) =

- Starring: Brendan Courtney
- Country of origin: Ireland
- No. of series: 4

Production
- Producer: Tyrone Productions
- Running time: 60mins (inc. adverts)

Original release
- Network: Network 2
- Release: 1999 – 2002

Wanderlust is an Irish dating game show produced by RTÉ contractor Tyrone Productions. It was hosted by Brendan Courtney.

== Format ==
There are three rounds in each episode of the show. In the first round, the contestants are asked a world question, generally related to the country visited in the third round. The ten contestants attempt to answer the question as quickly as possible and are allowed to use the Internet, which was fairly new at the time the show was produced. The fastest two contestants would then advance to the second round. In the second round, each contestants would chat online with people in other countries. Of the three blind dates, the contestants would each choose one to meet with. In the third round, the contestants would spend a weekend away in the country of their chosen blind date.

== Production ==
The series was both a travel and a dating show. While the contestants would go on their dates, the host Brendan Courtney would visit the sites of the city they were visiting and recommend places to eat and visit. Flight prices and details from any of the major Irish airports to the destination were also provided. Brendan's catch phrase was "I've a fiver in me hand and a fiver in me pocket, and I'm going to the airport, and I'm going like a rocket".

== Popularity ==
The series aired for two seasons on Monday Nights on Network 2 (now RTÉ 2). The format was sold to 11 countries. The series had an average of 200,000 viewers. The Irish series aired on Living TV in the UK.

== Cancellation ==
The series ended in 2002 after RTÉ chose not to renew the show for their 2003 line. Brendan Courtney was moving to other RTÉ shows, such as Treasure Island, and he also moved to the UK for some TV work.
