= Playdate (British TV series) =

Television series

- Genre: Phone-in dating show
- Starring: Various presenters
- Country of origin: United Kingdom

Production
- Running time: 2–3 hours
- Production companies: What Larks! Hamma & Glamma Productions; Gallowgate

Original release
- Network: ITV Play; ITV2
- Release: 6 October – 17 December 2006

Playdate is a British television dating programme that was made by Hamma & Glamma Productions for ITV. It was screened Monday to Fridays on ITV Play between 8.00pm and 10.00pm, and daily on ITV2 between 1.00am and 4.00am. Billed as "the UK’s first interactive TV dating show", the show's format is based around speed dating.

The show had one format: 7 days a week, the show was interactive: various singletons of both sexes were invited into the studio, and members of the public were invited to phone in and talk with the studio guests, known as "datees". Viewers were also invited to send text messages and picture messages to the "datees".

The show's presenters were Brendan Courtney, Dave O'Reilly, Giles Vickers Jones, Kat Shoob, Katy Pullinger, Zoe Hardman and former Big Brother winner Kate Lawler.

Cast members included DJ Anthony Ghosh (aka DJ Talent) who since then made the semi-final of ITV Britains Got Talent, and Reality TV personality & comedic Actress Charley Clark who has since appeared on various TV shows such as ITV The only way is Essex, E4 Carjackers, Channel 4 The Lie Detective.

Playdate was axed with its final show being aired on 17 December. The Mint was shown in its slot on ITV2 and The Mint Extra shown in its slot on ITV Play. The Mint ceased broadcasting in 2007.
