= Making the Cut (2020 TV series) =

- Genre: Reality competition
- Created by: Heidi Klum; Tim Gunn
- Presented by: Heidi Klum; Tim Gunn
- Judges: Naomi Campbell; Nicole Richie; Chiara Ferragni; Carine Roitfeld; Joseph Altuzarra; Jeremy Scott; Winnie Harlow
- Country of origin: United States
- Original language: English
- No. of seasons: 3
- No. of episodes: 26

Production
- Executive producers: Heidi Klum; Tim Gunn; Sara Rea; Page Feldman; Jennifer Love
- Running time: 50–69 minutes
- Production companies: SKR Productions; Amazon Studios

Original release
- Network: Amazon Prime Video
- Release: March 27, 2020 – August 19, 2022

Related
- Project Runway

Making the Cut is an American reality television series created and presented by Heidi Klum and Tim Gunn. The series premiered on March 27, 2020, on Amazon Prime Video. In March 2021, the series was renewed for a second season. The second season premiered on July 16, 2021. In April 2022, the series was renewed for a third season. The third season premiered on August 19, 2022.

== Cast ==
=== Hosts ===
- Heidi Klum
- Tim Gunn

=== Judges ===
==== Season 1 ====
- Naomi Campbell
- Nicole Richie
- Chiara Ferragni
- Carine Roitfeld
- Joseph Altuzarra

==== Season 2 ====
- Jeremy Scott
- Winnie Harlow

==== Season 3 ====
- Jeremy Scott
- Nicole Richie

=== Designers (Season 1) ===
Name	Age	Hometown	Placement
Jonny Cota	35	Los Angeles, California, U.S.	Winner
Esther Perbandt	43	Berlin, Germany	Runner-up
Sander Bos	24	Hasselt, Belgium	3rd
Megan Smith	38	Kansas City, Kansas, U.S.	4th
Ji Won Choi	26	Moore, Oklahoma, U.S.	5th
Rinat Brodach	35	Gan Yavne, Israel	6th
Sabato Russo	64	Milan, Italy	7th
Will Riddle	31	Paris, Stark County, Ohio, U.S.	8th
Troy Arnold	34	New York City, New York, U.S.	9th
Joshua Hupper	38	Columbus, Ohio, U.S.	10th
Martha Gottwald	28	Richmond, Virginia, U.S.	11th
Jasmine Chong	31	Kuala Lumpur, Malaysia	12th

=== Designers (Season 2) ===
Name	Hometown	Placement
Andrea Pitter	Brooklyn, New York, U.S.	Winner
Gary Graham	Franklin, New York, U.S	Runner Up
Andrea Salazar	Medellín, Colombia	3rd
Lucie Brochard	Paris, France	4th
Raf Swiader	Sosnowiec, Poland	5th
Joshua Scacheri	London, England	6th
Ally Ferguson	Los Angeles, California, U.S.	7th
Olivia OBlanc	New Orleans, Louisiana, U.S.	8th
Dushyant Asthana	Jaipur, India	9th
Lendrell Martin	South Orange, New Jersey, U.S.	10th

=== Designers (Season 3) ===
Name	Hometown	Placement
Yannik Zamboni	Zürich, Switzerland	Winner
Rafael Chaouiche	Curitiba, Brazil	Runner Up
Georgia Hardinge	London, England	3rd
Jeanette Limas	Philadelphia, Pennsylvania, U.S.	4th
Markantoine Lynch-Boisvert	Montréal, Canada	5th
Curtis Cassell	Brooklyn, New York, U.S.	6th
Sienna Li	Harbin, China	7th
Gabriella Meyer	Chicago, Illinois, U.S.	8th
Ciara Morgan	Los Angeles, California, U.S.	9th
Emily Bargeron	Savannah, Georgia, U.S.	10th

== Episodes ==
Season	Episodes	Originally released	
Season	Episodes	First released	Last released
1	10	March 27, 2020	April 24, 2020
2	8	July 16, 2021	August 6, 2021
3	8	August 19, 2022	September 9, 2022

=== Season 1 (2020) ===
No. overall	No. in season	Title	Original release date
1	1	"Heidi and Tim Are Back"	March 27, 2020
2	2	"Haute Couture"	March 27, 2020
3	3	"Collaboration"	April 3, 2020
4	4	"Fight For Your Life"	April 3, 2020
5	5	"Streetwear"	April 10, 2020
6	6	"Opposing Forces"	April 10, 2020
7	7	"Digital Marketing Campaign"	April 17, 2020
8	8	"Brand Evolution"	April 17, 2020
9	9	"Pop Up Shop"	April 24, 2020
10	10	"The Winner: The Next Global Brand"	April 24, 2020

=== Season 2 (2021) ===
No. overall	No. in season	Title	Original release date
11	1	"Brand Statement"	July 16, 2021
12	2	"Resortware"	July 16, 2021
13	3	"Modern Wedding"	July 23, 2021
14	4	"Face Off"	July 23, 2021
15	5	"Avant-Garde"	July 30, 2021
16	6	"Video Campaign"	July 30, 2021
17	7	"Concept Store"	August 6, 2021
18	8	"Finale"	August 6, 2021

=== Season 3 (2022) ===
No. overall	No. in season	Title	Original release date
19	1	"Evening Wear"	August 19, 2022
20	2	"Activewear Champions"	August 19, 2022
21	3	"Winter Wear"	August 26, 2022
22	4	"One Day, One Team"	August 26, 2022
23	5	"Festival Wear"	September 2, 2022
24	6	"Social Media Content"	September 2, 2022
25	7	"Concept Store"	September 9, 2022
26	8	"Finale"	September 9, 2022

== Designer progress ==
=== Season 1 (2020) ===
Designer	Episodes										Eliminated episode
Designer	1	2	3 (Note: This was a team challenge so there were two winners for the winning looks.)	4	5	6	7	8	9	10	Eliminated episode
Jonny	IN	LOW	HIGH	WIN	HIGH	HIGH	WIN	LOW	WIN	WINNER	10 - The Winner: The Next Global Brand
Esther	WIN	WIN	LOW	IN	LOW	IN	HIGH	WIN	IN	RUNNER-UP	10 - The Winner: The Next Global Brand
Sander	IN	IN	WIN	IN	IN (Note: Despite not being given a critique, Heidi informed Sander that his looks were not accessible and needed to be accessible moving forward.)	WIN	HIGH	HIGH	OUT		9 - Pop Up Shop
Megan	IN	IN	HIGH	HIGH	IN	IN	HIGH	OUT			8 - Brand Evolution
Ji Won	HIGH	HIGH (Note: Heidi informed Ji Won that her "Accessible" look would also be manufactured and available to purchase on Amazon after an Amazon Fashion representative saw her look and liked it.)	IN	IN	IN	LOW	OUT				7 - Digital Marketing Campaign
Rinat	IN	IN	IN	IN	WIN	OUT					6 - Opposing Forces
Sabato	IN	IN	WIN	IN	OUT						5 - Streetwear
Will	IN	IN	LOW	OUT							4 - Fight For Your Life
Troy	IN	IN	LOW	OUT							4 - Fight For Your Life
Joshua	IN	IN	OUT								3 - Collaboration
Martha	LOW	OUT									2 - Haute Couture
Jasmine	OUT										1 - Heidi and Tim Are Back

=== Season 2 (2021) ===
Designer	Episodes								Eliminated episode
Designer	1	2	3 (Note: This was a team challenge so there were two winners for the winning looks.)	4 (Note: This was a face off between Ally and Olivia since the judges could not decide on who to eliminate from the previous episode. All other contestants served as sewing assistants and models for them during the episode.)	5	6	7	8	Eliminated episode
Andrea P.	HIGH	HIGH	HIGH	IN	HIGH	WIN	IN	WINNER	8 - Finale
Gary	WIN	IN	IN	IN	WIN	WIN	IN	RUNNER-UP	8 - Finale
Andrea S.	IN	IN	IN	IN	LOW	HIGH	WIN	3RD PLACE	8 - Finale
Lucie	IN	LOW	WIN	IN	IN	OUT			6 - Video Campaign
Raf	IN	IN	IN	IN	IN	OUT			6 - Video Campaign
Joshua	LOW	WIN	WIN	IN	OUT				5 - Avant-Garde
Ally	IN	IN	LOW (Note: Ally was paired with Andrea P. and was originally in the top, but the judges put her in the bottom due to her personal aesthetic not being strong enough in the looks.)	OUT					4 - Face Off
Olivia	IN	IN	LOW	OUT					4 - Face Off
Dushyant	IN	OUT							2 - Resortware
Lendrell	OUT								1 - Brand Statement

=== Season 3 (2022) ===
Designer	Episodes								Eliminated episode
Designer	1	2	3	4	5	6	7	8	Eliminated episode
Yannik	IN	IN	HIGH	WIN	LOW	HIGH	WIN	WINNER	8 - Finale
Rafael	HIGH	WIN	IN	HIGH	HIGH	LOW	HIGH	RUNNER-UP	8 - Finale
Georgia	IN	IN	IN	IN	IN	WIN	LOW	3RD PLACE	8 - Finale
Jeanette	IN	LOW	WIN	HIGH	WIN (Note: Heidi informed Jeanette that their "Runway" look would be manufactured and available to purchase on Amazon rather than their "Accessible" look.)	LOW	OUT		7 - Concept Store
Markantoine	IN	HIGH	IN	IN	IN	OUT			6 - Social Media Content
Curtis	HIGH	HIGH (Note: The guest judge informed Curtis that their "Accessible" look would also be manufactured and available to purchase on Amazon.)	LOW	HIGH	OUT				5 - Festival Wear
Sienna	WIN	IN	IN	LOW	OUT				5 - Festival Wear
Gabriella	IN	IN	OUT						3 - Winter Wear
Ciara	LOW	OUT							2 - Active Champions
Emily	OUT								1 - Brand Statement

The designer won Making the Cut.
The designer won the challenge.
The designer had some of the best looks for the challenge but did not win.
The designer received feedback but was deemed safe.
The designer was deemed safe and did not receive feedback.
The designer was a sewing assistant/model for this challenge and was not up for elimination.
The designer had some of the worst looks of the challenge but did not get eliminated.
The designer was originally going to be eliminated, but one or more of the judges changed their minds.
The designer was eliminated from the competition.

== Production ==
On September 7, 2018, it was announced that Klum and Gunn would be leaving Project Runway to develop a fashion reality television series for Amazon Prime Video.

On June 26, 2019, it was announced that the series would be called Making the Cut and that Campbell, Richie, Roitfeld and Altuzarra would be judges on the show.

The series is executive produced by Klum, Gunn, Sara Rea, Page Feldman and Jennifer Love through SKR Productions.

On March 2, 2021, the series was renewed for a second season. The second season premiered on July 16, 2021.

On April 13, 2022, the series was renewed for a third season. The third season premiered on August 19, 2022.
