= The Brendan Courtney Show =

- Genre: Light entertainment
- Presented by: Brendan Courtney
- Country of origin: Ireland
- Original language: English
- No. of series: 1
- No. of episodes: 12

Production
- Executive producer: Stephen Stewart
- Production locations: Howl at the Moon Bar, Leeson Street, Dublin 2
- Running time: 60 minutes
- Production company: Green Inc.

Original release
- Network: TV3
- Release: 9 November 2005 – 15 February 2006

The Brendan Courtney Show is an Irish weekly chat show hosted by Brendan Courtney. It was first broadcast on TV3 on 9 November 2005 and aired for one series until 15 February 2006.

The Brendan Courtney Show featured guest interviews and live music from guest music groups and was aimed at a younger audience than its main rivals on RTÉ. The show also contained pranks on an unsuspecting public and was noted for its Graham Norton-like audience participation.

The UK's Celebrity Big Brother winner Chantelle Houghton gave her first Irish interview to The Brendan Courtney Show in February 2006.
