= Celebrity Coach Trip series 6 =

Celebrity Coach Trip
- Series 6
- No. of days: 15
- Winner: Adele Roberts & Kate Holderness

Release
- Original network: E4
- Original release: 6 January – 24 January 2020

Series chronology
- ← Previous; Series 5

Celebrity Coach Trip 6 is the sixth series of Celebrity Coach Trip in the United Kingdom and the last series before the COVID-19 pandemic. The series began airing on E4 on 6 January 2020 for 15 episodes and concluded on 24 January 2020. The series began on Day 1 in Saint-Tropez and ended on Day 15 in Barcelona.

== Voting system ==
The Voting system on this series was:

card Days 1 to 14 was a yellow card and a red card to follow
Day 15 was a vote to win

== Contestants ==
Couple were aboard the coach	Couple got yellow carded	Couple won a prize at the vote
Couple were immune from votes	Couple got red carded	Couple refused to vote
Couple left the coach	Couple were not present at the vote

Couple	Trip duration (days)														
Couple	1	2	3	4	5	6	7	8	9	10	11	12	13	14	15
Adele & Kate (original 6)					Yellow card										Winners on 24 January 2020
Woody & Kleiny (original 6)		Yellow card													Second on 24 January 2020
Brennan & Stephen	Not on Coach					Yellow card									Third on 24 January 2020
Perri & Kadeena	Not on Coach											Yellow card			Fourth on 24 January 2020
Artem & Graziano	Not on Coach														Fourth on 24 January 2020
Ester & Tanya	Not on Coach														Fourth on 24 January 2020
Mr. Motivator & ~~Louie~~ / Tim	Not on Coach										Yellow card			Red card	Eliminated 6th on 23 January 2020
Alex & Brianne	Not on Coach									Yellow card			Red card	Eliminated 5th on 22 January 2020	
Antony & Simon (original 6)				Yellow card					Red card	Eliminated 4th on 16 January 2020					
CiCi & Rustie (original 6)			Yellow card				Red card	Eliminated 3rd on 14 January 2020							
Georgia & Tommy (original 6)				Yellow card			Red card	Eliminated 2nd on 14 January 2020							
Amy & Jonathan (original 6)	Yellow card					Red card	Eliminated 1st on 13 January 2020								

== Voting history ==
Couple won the series	Couple were yellow carded	Couple were not present at the vote
Couple were runners up	Couple were red carded	Couple won a prize at the vote
Couple were third	Couple were immune from votes	Couple refused to vote
Couple were fourth	Couple left the coach

	Day																
	1	2	3	4	5	6	7		8	9	10	11	12	13	14	Result	15
Adele Kate	Antony; Simon	Georgia; Tommy	Georgia; Tommy	Antony; Simon	Amy; Jonathan	Brennan; Stephen	Georgia; Tommy	CiCi; Rustie	Woody; Kleiny	Antony; Simon	Alex; Brianne	Mr. Motivator	Perri; Kadeena	Mr. Motivator; Tim	Mr. Motivator; Tim	Woody; Kleiny	Winners
Woody Kleiny	Amy; Jonathan	Antony; Simon	CiCi; Rustie	Georgia; Tommy	Adele; Kate	Brennan; Stephen	Georgia; Tommy	CiCi; Rustie	Adele; Kate	Antony; Simon	Alex; Brianne	Exempt	Exempt	Exempt	Mr. Motivator; Tim	Adele; Kate	Second
Brennan Stephen	Not on Coach			Antony; Simon	Adele; Kate	Amy; Jonathan	Georgia; Tommy	CiCi; Rustie	Adele; Kate	Antony; Simon	Alex; Brianne	Mr. Motivator	Perri; Kadeena	Mr. Motivator; Tim	Mr. Motivator; Tim	Adele; Kate	Third
Perri Kadeena	Not on Coach										Alex; Brianne	Mr. Motivator	Alex; Brianne	Alex; Brianne	Adele; Kate	Woody; Kleiny	Fourth
Artem Graziano	Not on Coach												Perri; Kadeena	Mr. Motivator; Tim	Mr. Motivator; Tim	Adele; Kate	Fourth
Ester Tanya	Not on Coach													Mr. Motivator; Tim	Adele; Kate	Stephen; Brennan	Fourth
~~Louie~~ Mr. Motivator Tim	Not on Coach									Alex; Brianne	Alex; Brianne	Brennan; Stephen	Perri; Kadeena	Alex; Brianne	Adele; Kate	Red Carded (Day 14)	
Alex Brianne	Not on Coach						Tommy; Georgia	CiCi; Rustie	Brennan; Stephen	Antony; Simon	Woody; Kleiny	Mr. Motivator	Perri; Kadeena	Mr. Motivator; Tim	Red Carded (Day 13)		
Antony Simon	Amy; Jonathan	Adele; Kate	CiCi; Rustie	Georgia; Tommy	Adele; Kate	Brennan; Stephen	Georgia; Tommy	CiCi; Rustie	Woody; Kleiny	Alex; Brianne	Red Carded (Day 9)						
CiCi Rustie	Amy; Jonathan	Woody; Kleiny	Amy; Jonathan	Antony; Simon	Adele; Kate	Antony; Simon	Georgia; Tommy	N/A	Red Carded (Day 7)								
Georgia Tommy	Adele; Kate	Woody; Kleiny	CiCi; Rustie	Antony; Simon	Adele; Kate	Brennan; Stephen	Antony; Simon	Red Carded (Day 7)									
Amy Jonathan	Adele; Kate	CiCi; Rustie	Antony; Simon	Georgia; Tommy	Adele; Kate	Brennan; Stephen	Red Carded (Day 6)										
Notes	None			^{1}	None												
Voted Off	Amy; Jonathan; 3 votes	Woody; Kleiny; 2 votes	CiCi; Rustie; 3 votes	Antony; Simon; 4 votes	Adele; Kate; 6 votes	Brennan; Stephen; 5 votes	Georgia; Tommy; 6 votes	CiCi; Rustie; 6 votes	Adele; Kate; 3 votes	Antony; Simon; 4 votes	Alex; Brianne; 4 votes	Mr. Motivator; 4 votes	Perri; Kadeena; 5 votes	Alex; Brianne; Perri & Kadeena's choice	Mr. Motivator; Tim; 4 votes	Adele; Kate; 3 votes	
Voted Off	Amy; Jonathan; 3 votes	Woody; Kleiny; 2 votes	CiCi; Rustie; 3 votes	Georgia; Tommy; 3 votes	Adele; Kate; 6 votes	Amy; Jonathan; Brennan & Stephen's choice	Georgia; Tommy; 6 votes	CiCi; Rustie; 6 votes	Adele; Kate; 3 votes	Antony; Simon; 4 votes	Alex; Brianne; 4 votes	Mr. Motivator; 4 votes	Perri; Kadeena; 5 votes	Alex; Brianne; Perri & Kadeena's choice	Mr. Motivator; Tim; 4 votes	Adele; Kate; 3 votes	

=== Notes ===
^1 On Day 4, Brendan announced that the two couples with the most votes would receive yellow cards.

^2 On Day 6, Brennan & Stephen received a yellow card and were required to vote for another couple, they chose Amy and Jonathan who received a red card.

^3 On Day 7, Georgia & Tommy received a red card, after their elimination, Brendan punished them for influencing the voting, by making the remaining couples vote for another couple, CiCi & Rusty then received a red card, and were not asked to cast their own vote.

^4 On Day 8, each couple voted for a couple to receive five days immunity, it was a tie between Adele & Kate and Woody & Kleiny, the others were asked to make a final decision, they chose Adele & Kate.

^5 On Day 11 to Day 13, Woody & Kleiny could not participate for medical reasons. They return on Day 14.

^6 On Day 11, Louie withdrew, leaving Mr. Motivator to participate alone for that day, Louie was later replaced by Tim.

^7 On Day 13, Brendan announced that once everyone casts their vote, one couple's vote will be picked at random and whomever they chose would be eliminated regardless of the majority vote. Perri & Kadeena's names were chosen, meaning their vote for Alex & Brianne to be eliminated would be the only vote that counted. Mr. Motivator & Tim would have been eliminated otherwise.

== The trip by day ==
Day	Location	Activity	
Day	Location	Morning	Afternoon
1	Saint-Tropez	Caricatures	Survival class
2	Le Lavandou	Sailing	Judo
3	Toulon	Boomerang workshop	Llama farm
4	Marseille	Can-can dancing	Footgolf
5	Istres	Wakeboarding	Pottery class
6	Avignon	Treasure hunting	Freefall simulator
7	Beaucaire		Gyrocopter flying
8	Nimes	Kayaking	Go-Karting
9	Montpellier	Rollerblading	
10	Agde	Dodgeball	
11	Perpignan	Snail farming	
12	Sant Pere Pescador	Canoeing	
13	Sant Feliu de Guíxols	Paella making	
14	Lloret de Mar	Bungee jumping	Life drawing
15	Barcelona	Bubble football	Boat karting
