= Gary Graham (fashion designer) =

American fashion designer and artist

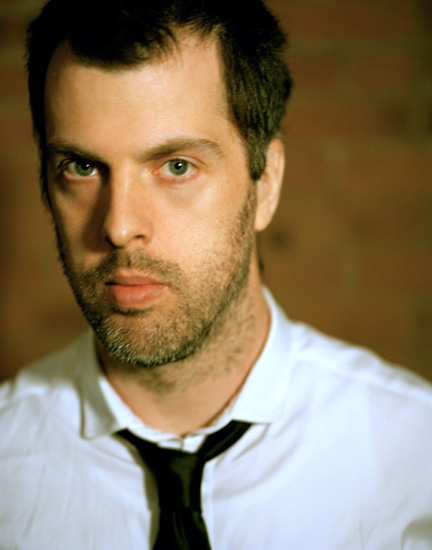
- Graham in 2008
- Born: June 21, 1969 (age 56); Wilmington, Delaware, U.S.
- Education: Maryland Institute College of Art; School of the Art Institute of Chicago
- Labels: GaryGraham422; Anagram; Gary Graham

Gary Graham (born June 21, 1969) is an American fashion designer and artist. He ran an eponymous fashion line in New York City from 1999 to 2017; his current line operates out of his flagship boutique and design studio in Franklin, New York. Graham's clothing reflects his interest in history, storytelling, and the roles of women in society.

His work has been covered in Vogue, WWD, NBC New York, and Chicago magazine. Graham is a critic in the textiles department at RISD.

In addition to a collection inspired by Shaker coats for the Hancock Shaker Village in Pittsfield, Massachusetts in 2021, Graham designed the clothing on all the robots in the Kara Walker installation, Fortuna and the Immortality Garden (Machine)/ A Respite for the Weary Time-Traveler./ Featuring a Rite of Ancient Intelligence Carried out by The Gardeners/ Toward the Continued Improvement of the Human Specious, exhibited at SFMoMA until June 1, 2026.

== Early life and career ==
Graham was born and raised in Wilmington, Delaware. After graduating from Newark High School, in Newark, Delaware, he studied painting for a year at Maryland Institute College of Art before transferring to the School of the Art Institute of Chicago to study painting and performance art before turning to fashion design. Graham has said “I grew up in the ’80s, and we would go into IF boutique and save up for a Gaultier something or other.”

Graham moved to New York City in 1993 where he worked for a costume production house and for Julie Taymor as a costume designer on projects like the award-winning Lion King, where he learned some of the techniques and skills he still employs like garment dying and cutting. He then apprenticed with fashion designer J. Morgan Puett for six years before working in product development at ABC Carpet & Home in New York City.

== Career and brands ==
In 1999 Graham launched his eponymous line which was sold at SoHo's IF Boutique. In 2006 he opened his first boutique on the first floor of ABC Carpet & Home where he used to work.

In 2009 Graham established his flagship store and studio in downtown New York's Tribeca neighborhood. The boutique achieved an instant cult following, counting fans such as Julia Roberts, Karen O, Helena Bonham Carter, and model and fashion muse Jamie Bochert, the same year Graham was honored as a CFDA/Vogue finalist. His clothing line, including the capsule collection Anagram, was sold at select luxury retailers worldwide, like Dover Street Market, Joyce Hong Kong and Barneys New York. In 2016, Graham asked seven of his muses and friends, Gina Gershon, Alexandra Marzella, Jennifer Nettles, Parker Posey, Sunrise Ruffalo, Kara Walker and Naomi Yang to model his fall collection as female archetypes in a short film titled Palacetor.

In 2017 he closed his New York City business and relocated to rural upstate New York where he relaunched his line as GaryGraham422 (422 referring to the street address of his new boutique and studio). GaryGraham422 is limited-run, small-batch and "a site-specific creative endeavor dedicated to creating small-batch collections of hand-finished garments using antique textiles and custom jacquards". Graham works Thistle Hill Weavers in Cherry Valley, New York to get his textiles made for the line. Later that year, Graham released his Fall 2017 ready-to-wear collection which was inspired by the 1870s Gothic Revival mansion located in Warwick, Rhode Island.

In August 2020 Graham launched a capsule GaryGraham422 collection with Joyce Hong Kong. The pieces, wrote Vogue, "centered around a series of unique surplus and vintage tapestry cocoon coats, with pieces like printed slips and crinoline dresses to wear with them." Inspired by Black Lives Matter and graffitied historical statues Graham had the conquistador figures stitched over, "blurring the faces and essentially tagging the tapestries."

In July 2021, Graham was featured as a finalist on season 2 of the Amazon TV series Making the Cut, a fashion design reality competition, where creative director of Moschino Jeremy Scott, models Winnie Harlow and Heidi Klum were judges. He started an accompanying GaryGraham422 collection for Amazon Fashion, GG422xAmazon, which viewers can buy.

=== Work with museums and other artists ===
In 2017, Graham worked with the Rhode Island Historical Society to draw up a textile collection inspired by three locales, showcasing the work with an installation of furniture, performance, video, and sound.

From May 31 to November 28, 2021 he presented a collection inspired by the Shakers, "Gary Graham: Looking Back to Look Forward," at the Hancock Shaker Village in Pittsfield, Massachusetts.

Graham designed all the costumes in Kara Walker's installation, Fortuna and the Immortality Garden (Machine) / A Respite for the Weary Time-Traveler. / Featuring a Rite of Ancient Intelligence Carried out by The Gardeners / Toward the Continued Improvement of the Human Specious, presented at SFMoMA from July 1, 2024 to June 1, 2026. Organized by Eungie Joo, the exhibition was a NY Times Critic's Pick and was on view in a ground-floor gallery of the museum that could be accessed directly without paying admission.

== Industry recognition ==
- 2009: CFDA/Vogue Fashion Fund Finalist
- 2010: Legend of Fashion Award, The School of the Art Institute of Chicago
- Council of Fashion Designers of America member

== Personal life ==
Graham lives in the Catskills village of Franklin, New York in a historic former bank, with his partner Kabinet & Kammer store proprietor Sean Scherer.

== Sources ==
- Jessica Reaves, Designers Mantra: Learn in Chicago, Then Leave, New York Times, April 30, 2010
- Eddie Roche, Making the Cut's Gary Graham Looks at the Show as His Reinvention, Daily Front Row, July 16, 2021
- James Kleinmann, Exclusive Interview: Making the Cut Season 2 Fashion Designer Gary Graham ,Queer Review, July 6, 2021
- Jessica Binns, Levi's Goes Avant-Garde on Amazon's 'Making the Cut', Sourcing Journal, July 30, 2021
- Yaeger, Lynn (April 3, 2017). "Gary Graham Extends His Winsome Fashion Sense to the World of Antique Furniture". Vogue.
