= Caryn Franklin =

British fashion journalist

Caryn Franklin MBE
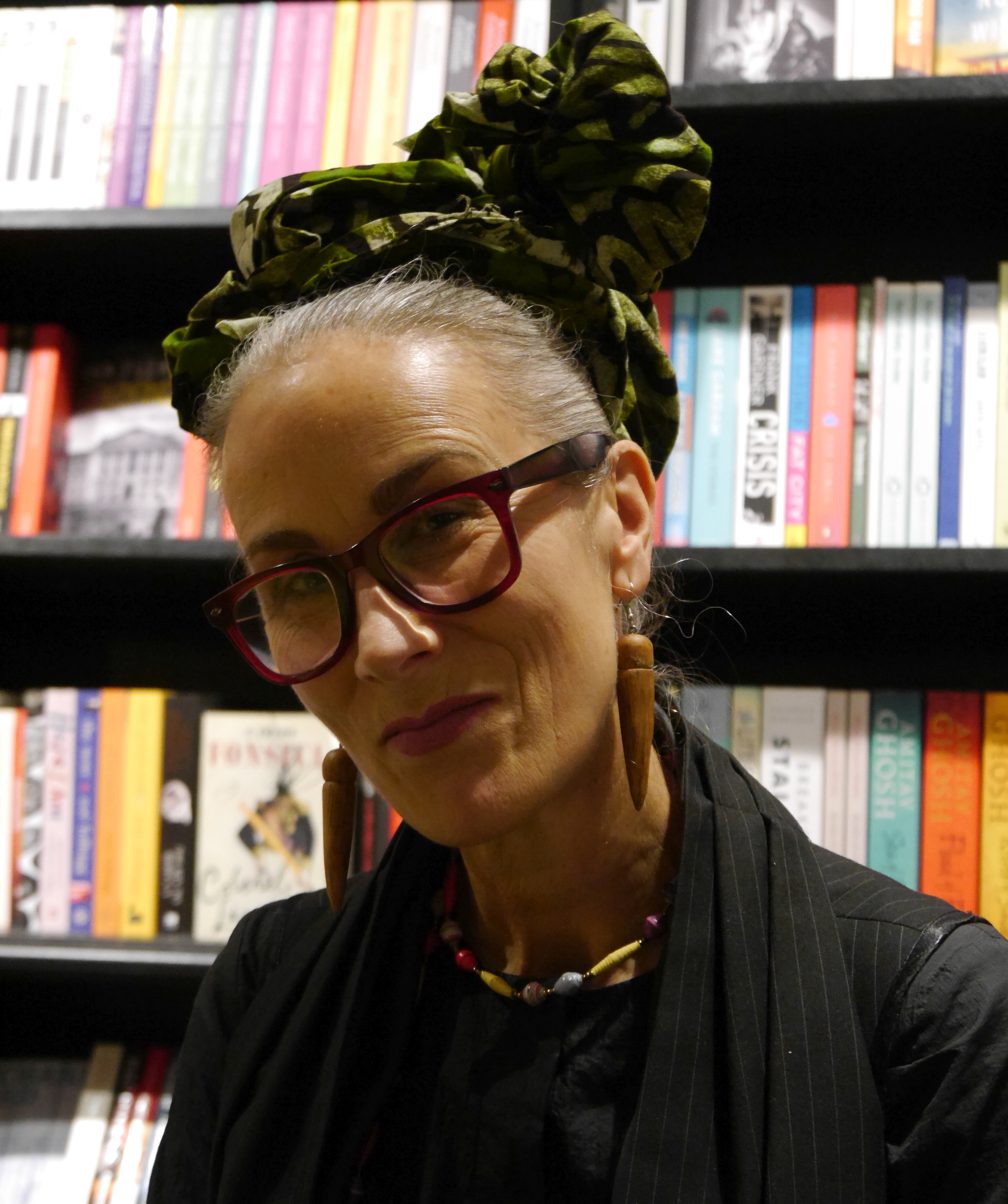
- Franklin in 2019
- Born: Caryn Franklin; 11 January 1959 (age 67); London, England
- Education: Kingston University, St Martins School of Art, London College of Fashion
- Occupations: Fashion and identity commentator. Visiting professor of diverse selfhood at Kingston School of Art
- Website: https://franklinonfashion.com/

Caryn Franklin MBE (born 11 January 1959) is a British fashion and identity commentator and visiting professor of diverse selfhood. She was former fashion editor and co-editor of i-D magazine in the 1980s and long-time presenter of BBC television's The Clothes Show from 1986 to 1998. She has been a commentator on fashion, image and identity politics for more than 40 years. She regularly blogs from her website.

== Background ==
Franklin has always been interested in the politics of image and self-esteem as well as straight fashion. Her reporting has involved refugees in battle zones, workers in free-trade-zone slums as well as high end creators. In a variety of projects she has collaborated with mental health experts, MPs and government ministers as well as fashion industry innovators. She has contributed to many national newspapers, books and magazines including editing the i-D Bible part two. She has five books to her name, including a novel. A broadcaster, writer, director and producer, she has worked with many major networks to produce TV shows and documentaries. This included The Clothes Show, which ran for twelve years (1986–98) and Style Challenge, which ran for three years, from 1996 to 1999, both on the BBC. She was also a regular morning and daytime TV pundit. Other shows included, Swank (Channel 4), Network 7 (Channel 4),The Frock and Roll Years (Channel 4), Style Bible (Granada), Well Woman (Granada) Style Files Discovery Channel and The All New Clothes Show (UKTV Style). She also created documentary tributes for ITV featuring designers such as Vivienne Westwood, Matthew Williamson, Philip Treacy. Other projects have included an Agnes B documentary, a cameo role in the Film Confetti Landscape Artist of the Year Sky Arts and Kingdom of Dreams Sky Arts.

She has acted as a silent partner consultant, for a range of commercial companies, as well as debating and deconstructing fashion for a variety of audiences, along with hosting or compering events. She has given after-dinner speeches, mentoring presentations, chaired panels and facilitated initiatives for brands and organisations as diverse as Coca-Cola, Merrill Lynch, Wella, L’Oreal, government minister Jo Swinson's Press Office, Graduate Fashion Week, National Portrait Gallery, Cambridge University, SHOWstudio and the V&A Museum.

Collaborating with her business partner Jane Galpin from 1999 to 2016, Franklin worked with many mainstream retailers to create consumer live events large and small. Clients include Clothes Show Live, hosted annually at the NEC, and National Wedding Show. A highlight for Franklin was hosting the Guinness World Record-breaking "Most Models on the Catwalk" event in Liverpool in 2015, conceived by Wayne Hemingway. The event, staged open air at Liverpool Docks took a new world record with more than 3,600 models appearing on stage, and prioritised diversity within the community, reaching out to a wide variety of marginalised groups and identities as well as known fashion talent.

Franklin has worked in education throughout her career, as an external assessor and lecturer for several colleges, including the Royal College of Art, Central St Martins and the London College of Fashion. She was Education Director at Clothes Show Live and is a Global Ambassador at Graduate Fashion Week. She continues to lecture in a wide variety of universities.

She collected an Honorary Fellowship from The Arts University College at Bournemouth, and held a visiting Fellowship at London College of Fashion. She has an Honorary Doctorate from both Kingston School of Art and Southampton Solent. She teaches evening classes in applied psychology at Goldsmiths and has been as a visiting professor at Kingston since 2016.

== Education ==
Franklin was educated at Feltham Comprehensive, leaving with A levels in Art and Law, Kingston School of Art, in Kingston upon Thames, graduating BA (Hons) in Graphic Design. She then completed a postgraduate year at Central St Martins on typography and photography, and in later life, graduated with distinction after studying an MSc in Applied Psychology at the London College of Fashion under Dr Carolyn Mair.

== Activism ==
As a fashion activist, Franklin has been vocal about unachievable body image ideals in fashion since the early 1990s working with the Eating Disorders Association (later to become Beat). Collaboration with BEAT ended in 2010. She has co-created a variety of campaigns, from Fashion Cares in the 1980s, which addressed AIDS fundraising, to co-chairing Fashion Targets Breast Cancer from 1996-2021 with designer Amanda Wakeley, a campaign that has helped spread the important message of "early detection saves lives", and contributed to the building and maintenance of Britain's first ever Breast Cancer Research Centre.

Also important for Franklin is promoting the debate for ethical sourcing and supply as well as promoting Fair Trade ideals. Having visited a variety of garment worker projects abroad, as well as meeting survivors from the collapsed Rana Plaza factory as part of a fact-finding mission organised by People Tree Founder Safia Minney MBE, Franklin is a supporter of sustainable fashion business and has made regular contributions to many slow fashion campaigns, collaborating with charities such as Oxfam and supporting initiatives including Extinction Rebellion Boycott Fashion.

In 2009 the launch of the All Walks Beyond the Catwalk led to many opportunities for further debate around the lack of diverse representation in fashion. Franklin became a member of government minister Lynne Featherstone's and Jo Swinson's Body Confidence steering committee, meeting regularly with members of parliament, educationalists and mental health experts. She also advised the Women's Equality Party research specifically on fashion protocol pertaining to challenge unachievable body ideals. In 2015 she contributed to new policy debate within the Advertising Standards Authority as a stakeholder challenging objectifying imagery of women and dehumanising messaging. This helped trigger ASA overhaul of 'accepted standards,' in advertising and resulted in new protocol, launched by MP Jess Phillips in Parliament. This would be an important experience which propelled her to examine the obstacles to inclusivity and diversity, in other words to unpack 'accepted standards', male gaze and dominant culture precedents through the newly devised MSc applied psychology course at London College of Fashion.

Work in recent years drawing upon applied psychology, specialising in selfhood, inclusivity and gender bias, has seen Caryn deliver corporate leadership talks and workshops with the aim of tackling lack of minoritised identities within teams and leadership. She has presented international workshops in Athens, New York, Toronto, Montreal and Prague.

Caryn's fifth Book (audio format) SKEWED was completed in 2022. Co written with Professor Keon West and narrated by both authors, this project blended scientific research and analysis to unpack the cumulative effect of media on our cognitive and psychological process. In Franklin's mind a necessary challenge to the cultural messaging around identity and objectification, including race, gender, gender non-conformity, sexual orientation, age, and attractiveness.

== All Walks Beyond the Catwalk ==
In 2009, Franklin co-founded the award-winning All Walks Beyond the Catwalk with Debra Bourne and Erin O'Connor, an initiative that promoted diverse body and beauty ideals. All Walks was unwaged, relying upon volunteers and collaborated with emerging designers, established big names in fashion and colleges and universities nationwide to promote the concept of emotionally considerate design and diverse representation for the industry and the educational curriculum. Also created was All Walks Diversity Network in association with Edinburgh College of Art, launched at Graduate Fashion Week in June 2011, attended by Lynne Featherstone. The national competition: Diversity NOW in association with i-D magazine and hosted at Graduate Fashion Week ran for four years. Franklin stepped away in 2015.

A member of FACE: Fashion Academics Creating Equality: www.weareface.uk since 2020, Franklin also pursues the accelerated recruitment and progression of Black and Brown academics as well as the centring of Black style and culture, to educational course and module evaluation metrics. She has spoken of whiteness and entitlement in education through her position at FACE and through organisations such as CHEAD: Council for Higher Education in Art and Design.

== Personal life ==
She has two daughters, Mateda Phoenix and Roseby Ottoline, and is married to BAFTA-winner and RTS award-winning filmmaker Ian Denyer. Mateda's father was the award-winning script writer of Young Soul Rebels Mandu Saldaan, who died in 2014 as a result of Multiple Sclerosis complications.

In 2013, Franklin was appointed a Member of the Order of the British Empire (MBE) in the 2013 New Year Honours for services to diversity and positive body image in the fashion industry.
