= Andrea Pitter =

Jamaican American fashion designer

- Education: Fashion Institute of Technology
- Website: www.andreapitter.com

Andrea Pitter is a New York-based Jamaican American fashion designer and the founder of Pantora Bridal. Known for inclusive design, she won the second season of American reality television series Making the Cut.

== Life and career ==
Pitter was raised in Crown Heights neighbourhood of Brooklyn by Jamaican immigrant parents. She studied at the High School of Fashion Industries and a graduate of the Fashion Institute of Technology.

Pitter launched Pantora Bridal in 2009. As a bridal designer she is known for inclusive design that focuses on Black women and those traditionally excluded from the wedding industry. In 2021 she joined the wedding planning company The Knot as a mentor for wedding professionals from underrepresented backgrounds.

Pitter won the second season of Making the Cut. The win included a three-year lease of a storefront at the ROW DTLA. She used the appearance on the show to expand a ready-to-wear line of Pantora.
