= Brendan Courtney =

Irish television presenter and producer

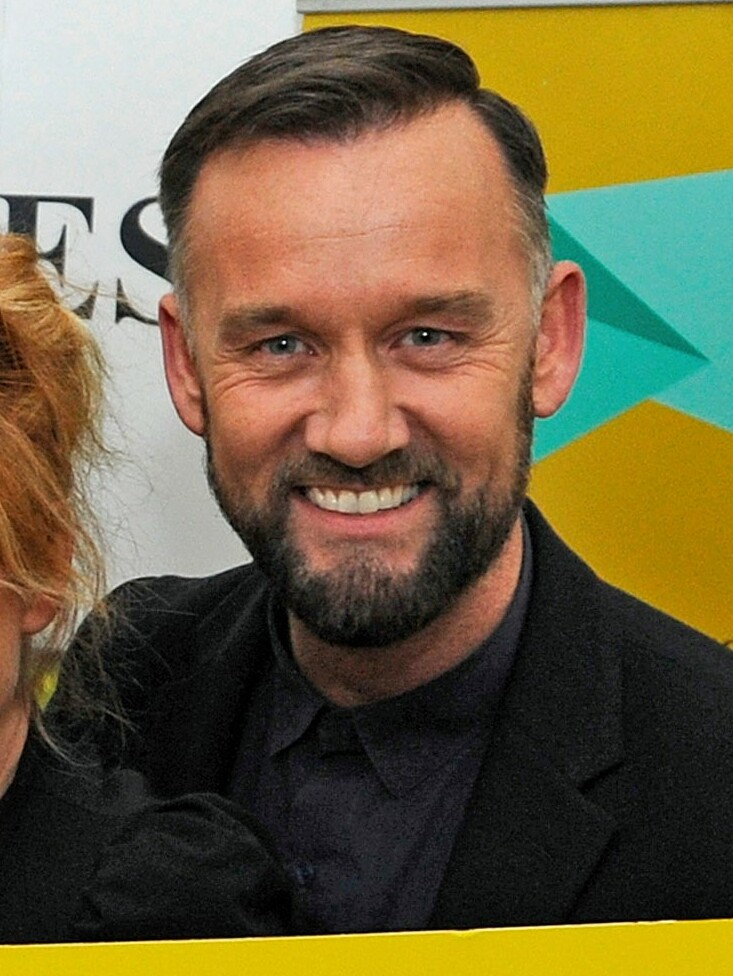
- Courtney in 2013
- Born: 24 June 1971 (age 55); Tallaght, Dublin, Ireland
- Notable work: Wanderlust; The Brendan Courtney Show; Playdate; Off the Rails; Keys To My Life

Brendan Courtney (born 24 June 1971) is an Irish TV presenter and fashion designer. He was the first openly gay presenter in Ireland. He has hosted Wanderlust on RTÉ Two, The Brendan Courtney Show on TV3.

== Career ==
Courtney began his career on RTÉ Two's Wanderlust and ITV1's Love Match UK. He was the main developer of the idea of Wanderlust. He previously hosted The Brendan Courtney Show, a prime time talk show on Ireland's TV3 television channel. He also presented the RTÉ reality show Treasure Island.

In October 2006, he became the presenter on ITV2's late night dating show Playdate. From 2006 to 2008, he hosted and produced The Clothes Show with Caryn Franklyn and Louise Redknapp, As of Autumn 2008, he was co-hosting RTÉ One's Off the Rails. He also frequently hosted at the Clothes Show Live in Birmingham. He was on the panel of judges on Ladies' Day at the 138th RDS Horse Show on 4 August 2011. He has also judged Alternative Miss Ireland in The George, Dublin. He is one half of design duo Lennon Courtney along with Sonya Lennon.

Since 2020, he was hosted Keys To My Life on RTE1.

== Activism ==
In August 2009, Courtney spoke at a rally in Dublin requesting full marriage equality.

== Alleged homophobic assaults ==
Courtney was attacked in a hate crime by a stranger while walking home down South Great George's Street in Dublin in 2011, a man punched him in the face and shouted "queer" before running away. Courtney said it was "disgraceful" that such an incident could occur in Dublin. He told Liveline that more than 50 other gay people had told him of their own experiences of being assaulted or verbally abused in towns nationwide.

In 2023 Courtney penned a letter to the Irish Examiner condemning an assault on a gay Navan teen and advocating for activism and community solidarity for the LGBTQ+ community. In it he recounted his own experiences being attacked as a young teen and in 2014 being punched in the face in an evidently homophobic attack.

In February 2025 Courtney was attacked by three men as he walked to his home in Dublin. Courtney posited that the attack was motivated by homophobia and that the men recognised him as a TV presenter.

== See also ==
- Significant acts of violence against LGBT people
- Violence against LGBT people
