= Clothes Show Live =

Consumer exhibition series

- Status: Inactive
- Genre: Fashion
- Venue: National Exhibition Centre
- Locations: Birmingham, UK
- Country: UK
- Inaugurated: 1989
- Most recent: 2017
- Attendance: 165,093
- Organizer: SME London
- Website: www.clothesshow.com

The Clothes Show (formerly Clothes Show Live) was a consumer exhibition brand held annually from 1989 to 2016 in December at the Birmingham's National Exhibition Centre, and in Liverpool in July 2017. The event showcased the latest fashion, beauty and music.

== The Clothes Show history ==
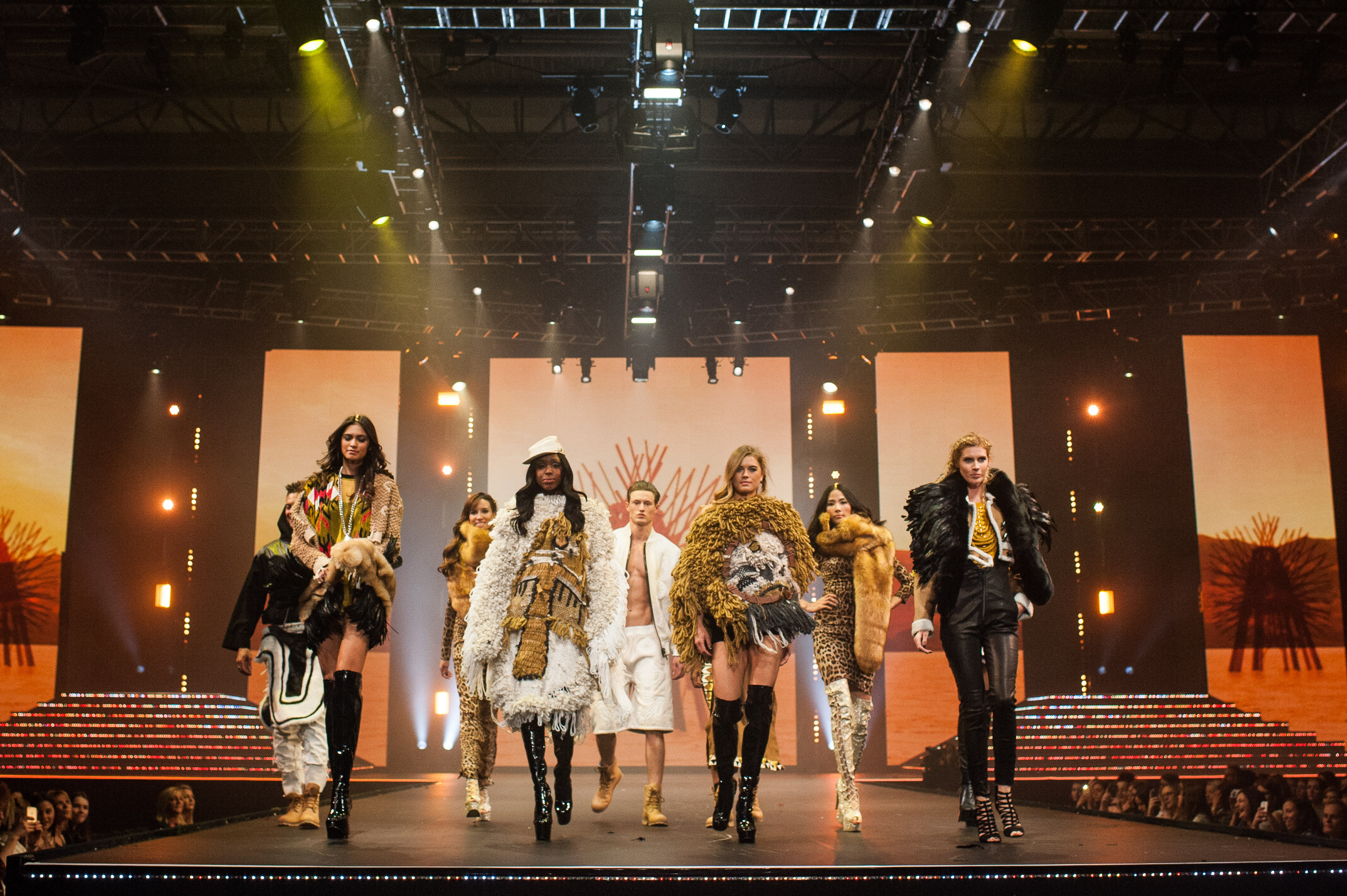
Models in the Fashion Theatre

The first show launched during 1989 in London by Gavin Brown and June Barker, on the back of the then popular television programme. The event was held at the NEC, in Birmingham, UK until 2016. It was owned and operated by Haymarket Exhibitions, part of the Haymarket Media Group. Haymarket later sold The Clothes Show to SME London.

Select was the official model agency partner and used the show as a hunting ground for young new talent. Many now famous faces were plucked from the shows, including Holly Willoughby, Cat Deeley and Erin O'Connor amongst many more.

In 2017 the event moved from Birmingham to Liverpool and was held in several locations around the city from the 7th to 9th July. Following this the event was rested indefinitely.

=== 1986–1999 ===
The Clothes Show was first exhibited as a television show in 1986 and from 1989 became an extremely successful live event. During these years, some of the most famous bands including the Spice Girls, 5ive and Boyzone performed. Successful models and presenters including Holly Willoughby, Vernon Kay and Cat Deeley were spotted by model scouts at the show during the 90s.

=== 2000–2002 ===
==== In association with the British Heart Foundation NEC Birmingham ====
There were a host of celebrities at these shows including, presenters Dermot O'Leary and Jamie Theakston, Liberty X, Vernon Kay, Dane Bowers, Josie d'Arby, DJ Luck and MC Neat, So Solid Crew and Ms. Dynamite. An audience of 6,500 in the British Heart Foundation Fashion Theatre were able to enjoy Big Chef Production award-winning chic and progressive style on the Catwalk.

=== 2003 ===
==== 5–10 December – NEC Birmingham ====
Clothes Show Live featured appearances from Hollyoaks cast members Ben and Izzy aka. Marcus Patric and Elize Du Toit and Duncan James from Blue. Sugababes, Darius Danesh and Lisa Mafia all performed. The hosts for the show were Brian Dowling, who won the award for being the most stylish TV personality at the NOW magazine Style Awards, Tara Palmer Tomkinson, Vernon Kay and So Solid Crew's Harvey.

==== 12th-14th – Fashion Victims, Powered by the Clothes Show Live, Jaarbeurs Utrecht ====
Haymarket Exhibitions staged a reworked version of the Clothes Show Live in the Netherlands covering 26,000sqm. This was a joint venture between Haymarket and the Dutch venue's in-house organising arm, Royal Dutch Jaarbeurs Exhibitions and Media. Haymarket Exhibitions's managing director, Gavin Brown said: "It would be wonderful if we could take more of our successful UK events and run them in other areas of the world, so it is something we are looking at very closely." "Clothes Show Live is one of our flagship events and is now in its 15th year. The Dutch and British communicate very well, the fashion in Holland is very similar to that in the UK and so there is a natural empathy there," added Brown. The exhibition was aimed at 16- to 24-year-olds and included fashion shows, style and beauty tips, makeovers and music.

=== 2004 ===
==== 3–8 December – NEC Birmingham ====
This year's show was presented by June Sarpong, Jeff Brazier and Dave Berry. There were performances from boy band Phixx, Lemar, Estelle, 411 and Rooster. Models Jodie Kidd, Jade Parfitt and Elizabeth Jagger all graced the stage.

=== 2005 ===
==== 2–7 December – NEC Birmingham ====
Presented by the Nokia Fashion Collection William Baker, stylist to Kylie Minogue, brought his flair and expertise to the show as the creative director of the Nokia Fashion Theatre. Joined by fashion designer Julien Macdonald, photographer Helena Christensen and model Vivien Solari worked alongside William Baker to produce the cover image that would represent Clothes Show Live 2005. This year also saw an extension to the show support for young fashion and design talent in the UK with a variety of initiatives including the introduction of the Clothes Show Live Educational Bursary and the appearance of the London Fashion Forum. There was another great line-up with performances this year from Simon Webbe, X Factor's Maria and ex-Blazin Squad member's new band, Friday Hill. Presenting this year were, Vernon Kay and June Sarpong.

=== 2006 ===
==== 1–6 December – NEC Birmingham ====
This was the year for the re-launch of the Clothes Show Live programme. After a six-year hiatus, Clothes Show Live was brought back onto our screens through the UKTV Style channel and was hosted by Brendan Courtney, Louise Redknapp and original presenter, Caryn Franklin.

This year the fashion theatre was brought to Birmingham by Nokia, attracting the late Amy Winehouse and Blue's Duncan James and Simon Webbe to the stage. Presenting on the theatre stage were Clothes Show favourites T4's June Sarpong and MTV's Dave Berry.

=== 2007 ===
==== 7–12 December – NEC Birmingham ====
This year's star line-up attracted 160,000 visitors to Birmingham's NEC over the 6 day period, this included, X Factor winner Shane Ward, Desperate Housewives' gardener Jesse Metcalfe, model and designer Caprice, Big Brother 8 housemates Ziggy, Sam and Amanda and fashion industry experts Caryn Franklin and Hilary Alexander. Presenting this year were Peaches Geldof and Dave Berry, who were also joined by Clothes Show model, Erin O'Connor. Sugababes headlined the fashion theatre show this year.

=== 2008 ===
==== 5–10 December – NEC Birmingham ====
The Saturdays and Alesha Dixon performed in the fashion theatre. Nina Porter, who has appeared in Burberry's Spring/Summer 2011 campaign alongside Lily Donaldson and Rosie Huntington-Whiteley was spotted by a model scout at the show whilst on a school trip. She is still at school and has also appeared in Vogue magazine.

=== 2009 ===
==== 29–31 May Clothes Show London, ExCel London ====
Clothes Show Live came back to London for the first time since 1989 and was hosted by Erin O’Connor and George Lamb. To accompany the new summer time slot, the Designer Beach in association with Company was introduced. Visitors were treated to Clothes Show model favourites, Max Rogers and Anthony Lowder strutting their stuff on the Catwalk with a special appearance from Jordan.

==== 4–9 December Clothes Show Live – NEC Birmingham ====
Hollyoaks star Roxanne McKee was the face of this year's Clothes Show Live and was joined by various fellow Hollyoaks stars.

Adding yet more glamour and style to the mix, there were special guest appearances from Gok Wan and stylish Fearne Cotton who received the best dressed woman of the year award at London's Clothes Show.

=== 2010 ===
==== 3–8 December Clothes Show Live – NEC Birmingham ====
TOWIE's Lauren, Mark, Sam and Harry added a bit of Essex glamour to the proceedings whilst there was music from Sunday Girl and boybands Inju5tice and Vice.

==== 25–27 June – London's Earls Court ====
London's Earls Court hosted this year's show with the help of headliners, Gok Wan and Arlene Philips. Caryn Franklin and The Telegraph's Fashion Director Hilary Alexander were also hosts, alongside George Lamb who presented this year for the 'Cities of the World' themed fashion theatre show.

Music star Paloma Faith performed live and showcased her trendy style. Boyband, The Wanted delighted teenage girls by performing their debut single "All Time Low". The Style Stage demonstrated their tips on how to wear the latest spring/summer trends and what to look for as the autumn/winter collections hit the shop. The Young Fashion Photographer of the year was awarded to Amberly Valentine.

=== 2011 ===
==== 2–7 December – NEC Birmingham ====
The 2011 event promoted the ultimate girls day out with a campaign fronted by George Lamb and girl band Parade. The show was hosted by George Lamb and Grace Woodward. This years face of clothes show was 16-year-old Mel Titmass from Bury. There was music from Alexandra Burke, X Factor's The Risk and Kimberly Wyatt's Her Majesty and The Wolves, alongside dance acts from The Dance Show. Jeff Brazier was also presenting on the Image Catwalk, whilst there were guest appearances from some of Hollyoaks hotties and cast members from TOWIE.

The class of 2011 for Bright Young Things, a celebration of new and emerging talent had four winners. Charlotte Wood was awarded Young Designer of the year, Emma Spencer won Young Fashion Photographer and Young Hairdresser of The Year was awarded to Leah Walton. In association with Select Model Management, Lottie Richman was scouted at the show and won Face of 2012.

=== 2012 ===
==== 7–11 December – Clothes Show Live in association with Suzuki – NEC Birmingham ====
The Jubilee year saw Clothes Show Live re-affirm its authority in the fashion industry. The campaign was fronted by model Daisy Lowe, stylist to the stars Grace Woodward and British designer Henry Holland. Other fashion elite in attendance were Mark Fast, Bora Aksu and John Rocha. Highstreet brands who exhibited at the show included Oasis, Miss Selfridge, Vero Moda, New Look and Debenhams. Notable designers included Tatty Devine and Gushlow and Cole. The ASOS Marketplace featured a number of recent graduates who had won their place to showcase their brand new collections at the show as an innovative strategy to promote the industry's rising stars. The Young Designer of the year was Curtis Li Young. Britain and Ireland's Next Top Model finalists were also there on the Highstreet Catwalk.

=== 2013 ===
==== 6–10 December – NEC Birmingham ====
This year was the 25th Anniversary of Clothes Show Live. Jade Thompson, the former winner of Britain and Ireland's Next Top Model Live and Fashion Theatre Star, was announced as the Face of Clothes Show Live 2013. The Only Way Is Essex cast members Mark Wright, Amy Childs, Lauren Goodger, Jess Wright and Gemma Collins were at the Show, along with reality star Peter Andre and model Caggie Dunlop. In the Alcatel Fashion Theatre, there was music performances by Stooshe, Union J and The X Factor band Kingsland Road. Contestants from 2013's Britain & Ireland's Next Top Model also made an appearance on the Highstreet Catwalk.Zandra Rhodes designed a cake to celebrate the shows 25th year which was presented to one of the Founders Gavin Brown, managing director of Haymarket Exhibitions and Clothes Show television presenter Caryn Franklin.

== Clothes Show London ==
2009 saw the debut launch of Clothes Show London that took place from 29 to 31 May in ExCeL, making the brand a bi-annual occurrence across the UK.

The show launched the Clothes Show Style Awards and included awards for Fashion Photographer of the Year, won by Kayt Jones, Fashion Stylist of the Year and Make-up Artist of the Year, all voted for by top industry experts within the UK's most influential media. The other categories were all voted for by the public and included Best Dressed Man of the Year, won by George Lamb and Best Dressed Woman of the Year, collected in style by Fearne Cotton.

The 2010 moved to Earl's Court between 25 and 27 June 2010.
