= Georgia Hardinge =

English fashion designer

- Born: 4 February 1984 (age 42); London, England, UK
- Education: Parsons Paris
- Label: Georgia Hardinge
- Awards: Merit Award 2011, BFC Contemporary Initiative 2014

Georgia Victoria Hardinge (born 4 February 1984) is an English fashion designer based in London.

== Biography ==
The Honourable Georgia Victoria Hardinge was born in London, daughter of Old Harrovian (Henry) Nicholas Paul Hardinge, 5th Viscount Hardinge (1929–1984), assistant general manager of the Royal Bank of Canada, and his second wife, Florence, daughter of Harold, Baron von Oppenheim, of Cologne. Two of her elder brothers were the 6th and 7th Viscounts Hardinge; the current- 8th- Viscount Hardinge is her nephew.

She attended the independent Windlesham House School, then Parsons School of Design in Paris, graduating in 2008 and winning critical acclaim when she was awarded the best designer award for her graduate collection. Hardinge established her own label in 2010 focusing on a sculptural aesthetic.

Her inspiration for design comes from a passion for architectural shapes and sculpture, which can be seen throughout her work. She works closely with a pleat specialist to develop pleating techniques from paper sculptures and new technological fabrics and textile treatments. The Georgia Hardinge brand incorporates a strong sculptural style with extensive use of fabric manipulation and strong print design.

== Professional career ==
Following on from Hardinge's successful 2010 Autumn/Winter 'Cage Collection' exhibited at Somerset House in London she was chosen to create three looks for that years Victoria's Secret show with Swarovski sponsoring one of her pieces.

Hardinge's Autumn/Winter 2011 collection won her the 'Merit Award' granting her first stand-alone runway show in London as part of Vauxhall Fashion Scout. The same year saw Hardinge accepted into the Pioneer program and awarded more sponsorship, this time from the Centre for Fashion Enterprise.

In 2012 Lancôme teamed up with the Georgia Hardinge brand to design two of their skincare bottles (Génefique and Visionnaire) as a limited edition range for the Queen's Diamond Jubilee sold exclusively in Selfridge's. At the start of 2013 the Hardinge label produced their first capsule collection with British retail label River Island including their first venture into accessories with one bag and two shoe designs. In May they created bespoke costumes for the Girls Aloud's Reunion Tour and then by late 2013 Hardinge was collaborating once again with River Island through the Design Forum, this time on an 11 piece capsule collection that sold in 20 stores nationwide and online.

2014 has seen Georgia Hardinge awarded sponsorship once more, this time from the British Fashion Council and eBay as part of the contemporary initiative. The Hardinge brand designed an exclusive shirt to be sold only on eBay and exhibited their Spring/Summer 2015 collection at Somerset House in September of the same year. An exclusive T-shirt design will be sold on eBay in the BFC shop during London Fashion Week alongside selected pieces from AW14. Hardinge went on to showcase her Spring Summer 2015 collection entitled 'sequence' at Somerset House in London during September 2014.

2016 as an exclusive collaboration with the Elephant Family charity, Georgia Hardinge's work was displayed in the Victoria & Albert Museum, London. 40 sculptural pieces were later created to be displayed at Selfridges where they could be bought by guests for the Royal Family's prestigious Animal Ball.

In 2022 she participated in season 3 of Making the Cut.

== Press ==
The Georgia Hardinge label has received international press in Grazia and Elles as 'One to Watch', Instyle's 'Name to Know' and main fashion features in Sunday Times Style, ID, British Vogue, Stylist, Harper's Bazaar, L'Officielle and Nylon.

Celebrity fans include Florence and the Machine, Beyonce, Alicia Keys, Nelly Furtado, Lady Gaga, Erin O'Connor, Ellie Goulding and Iggy Azelia.
