= Big Brother (British TV series) series 3 =

Coordinates: 51°39′23″N 0°16′02″W

Big Brother
- Series 3
- Series three logo
- Presented by: Davina McCall
- No. of days: 64
- No. of housemates: 14
- Winner: Kate Lawler
- Runner-up: Jonny Regan
- Companion shows: Big Brother's Little Brother; Big Brother Live; Saturday Night Live
- No. of episodes: 72

Release
- Original network: Channel 4
- Original release: 24 May – 26 July 2002

Series chronology
- ← Previous; Series 2 Next → Series 4

Big Brother 2002, also known as Big Brother 3, is the third series of the British reality television series Big Brother. The show followed fourteen contestants, known as housemates, who were isolated from the outside world for an extended period of time in a custom built house. Each week, one or more of the housemates were evicted by a public vote. The last remaining housemate, Kate Lawler, was declared the winner, winning a cash prize of £70,000 by becoming the first female winner of the series.

As with the previous two series, Big Brother 3 lasted 64 days. It launched on Channel 4 on 24 May 2002 and ended on 26 July 2002. Davina McCall returned as presenter for her third consecutive year. Twelve housemates entered on launch night, with two additional housemates being introduced in later weeks.

The series was watched by an average of 5.8 million viewers, making it the highest viewed series of the show to date. Its finale peaked at 10 million viewers - making it both the 2nd most watched episode of Big Brother UK and the tenth most watched broadcast by Channel 4 to date.

== Format ==
Big Brother is a game show in which a group of contestants, called housemates, live in isolation from the outside world in a custom built "house", which includes everyday facilities such as a fully equipped kitchen, garden, two bedrooms, and a bathroom. The house is also a television studio with cameras and microphones in most of the rooms to record the activities of the housemates. The only place where housemates can escape the company of the other contestants is the Diary Room, where they are encouraged to voice their true feelings. Not all Diary Room footage is broadcast due to the privacy of the contestants. Each week all housemates nominate two of their fellow contestants for potential eviction. Failure to do so may result in a punishment, such as a reduction in the prize fund. The two, or more, housemates with the highest number of nominations face a public vote conducted by phone, with the contestant receiving the most votes being evicted from the house. The last contestant remaining in the house is declared the winner and is awarded a cash prize of £70,000. On eviction night, there were two live eviction shows held. In the first, host Davina McCall would reveal to the housemates who had been evicted from the house, though the percentages were withheld from the group. Following the announcement, the evicted housemate had two hours to pack their belongings and prepare to leave the house. At the start of the second episode, McCall would inform the evicted housemate that they had only moments to walk out the door. Upon exiting through the house's front door, McCall led the evictee into a studio where they met with their family and friends. While in the studio, McCall had an interview with the evicted housemate, and showed their best bits - a video compilation of their time in the house.

== Housemates ==
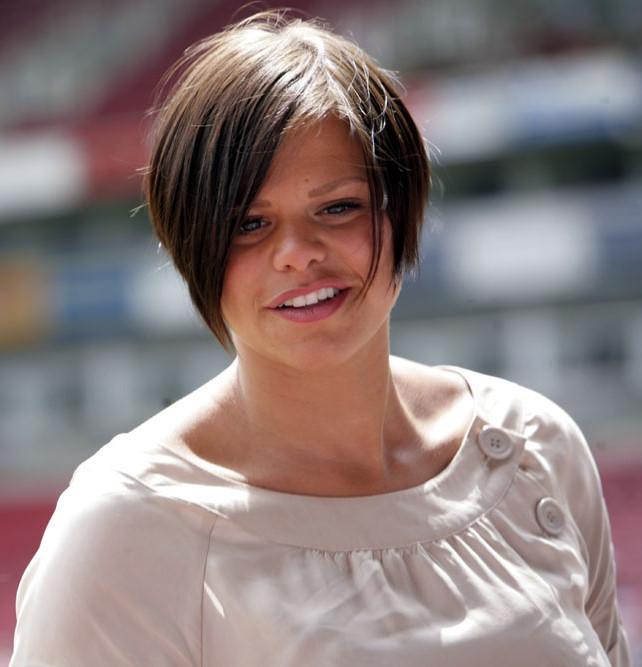

Jade Goody

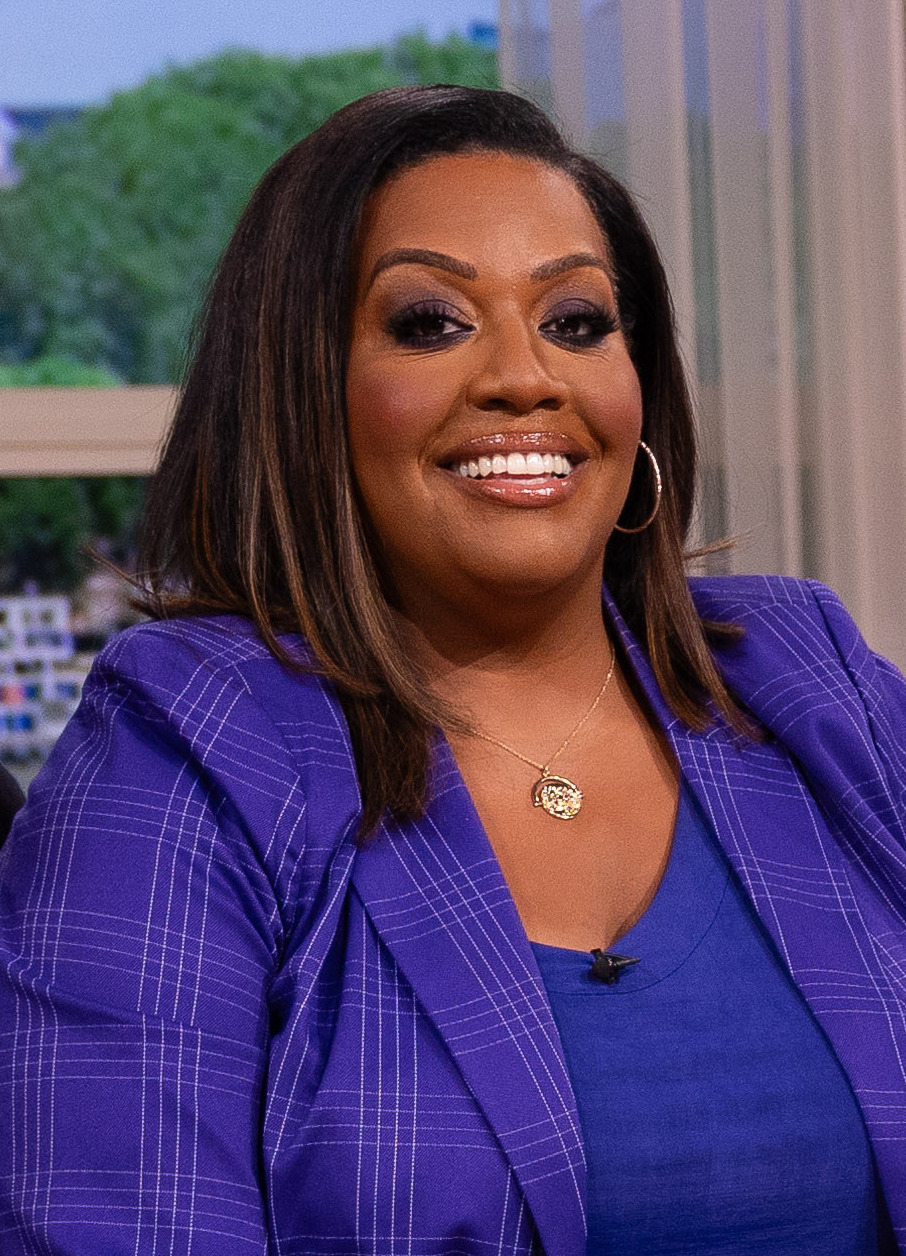

Alison Hammond

Name	Age on entry	Hometown	Day entered	Day exited	Result
Kate Lawler	22	Beckenham	1	64	Winner
Jonny Regan	29	Trimdon, County Durham	1	64	Runner-up
Alex Sibley	23	London	1	64	3rd place
Jade Goody	20	London	1	64	4th place
Tim Culley	23	Worcester	24	57	Evicted
Peter James "PJ" Ellis	22	Birmingham	1	50	Evicted
Adele Roberts	23	Southport	1	43	Evicted
Sophie Pritchard	24	Marlow	10	36	Evicted
Spencer Smith	22	St Ives	1	29	Evicted
Lee Davey	21	Leicester	1	22	Evicted
Sandy Cumming	43	Fife	1	20	Walked
Alison Hammond	27	Birmingham	1	15	Evicted
Lynne Moncrieff	36	Aberdeen	1	8	Evicted
Sunita Sharma	25	London	1	7	Walked

== Nominations table ==
	Week 1	Week 2	Week 3	Week 4	Week 5	Week 6	Week 7	Week 8	Week 9 Final		Nominations received
Kate	No nominations	Alex, Sandy	Alex, Sandy	Alex, Jade	Alex, Jade	Jade, Alex	No nominations	Tim, Alex	Winner (Day 64)		6
Jonny	No nominations	Sandy, Alex	Sandy, Alex	Alex, Spencer	Alex, Tim	Adele, Jade	No nominations	Tim, Alex	Runner-up (Day 64)		16
Alex	No nominations	Jonny, Alison	Jonny, Lee	Spencer, PJ	Jonny, Kate	Jade, Jonny	No nominations	Jade, Jonny	Third place (Day 64)		19
Jade	Nominated	Jonny, Alex	Lee, Sophie	Banned	Sophie, Jonny	Kate, Tim	No nominations	Tim, Alex	Fourth place (Day 64)		14
Tim	Not in House			Exempt	Sophie, Jonny	Jade, Kate	No nominations	Jade, Jonny	Evicted (Day 57)		6
PJ	No nominations	Alex, Sandy	Lee, Sophie	Alex, Sophie	Sophie, Adele	Adele, Jade	No nominations	Evicted (Day 50)			3
Adele	No nominations	Alison, Kate	Jonny, Lee	PJ, Spencer	Jonny, PJ	Jade, Jonny	Evicted (Day 43)				3
Sophie	Not in House	Exempt	Alex, Sandy	Spencer, Jade	Jade, Tim	Evicted (Day 36)					7
Spencer	No nominations	Alex, Alison	Jonny, Lee	Sophie, Alex	Evicted (Day 29)						4
Lee	No nominations	Jade, Kate	Jade, Jonny	Evicted (Day 22)							5
Sandy	No nominations	Jonny, Alison	Jonny, Kate	Walked (Day 20)							7
Alison	No nominations	Alex, Sandy	Evicted (Day 15)								4
Lynne	Nominated	Evicted (Day 8)									0
Sunita	No nominations	Walked (Day 7)									0
Notes	1	2	none	3	none		4	none	5		
Against public vote	Adele, Alex, Alison, Jade, Jonny, Kate, Lee, Lynne, PJ, Sandy, Spencer, ~~Sunita~~	Alex, Alison, Sandy	Jonny, Lee	Alex, Spencer	Jonny, Sophie	Adele, Jade, Jonny, Kate	Kate, PJ	Alex, Tim	Alex, Jade, Jonny, Kate		
Walked	Sunita	none	Sandy	none							
Evicted	Lynne; Housemates' choice to evict	Alison; 38.52% to evict	Lee; 84% to evict	Spencer; 55.08% to evict	Sophie; 85% to evict	Adele; 62% to evict	PJ; 80.7% to evict	Tim; 81.48% to evict	Jade; 20% (out of 4)	Alex; 27.4% (out of 3)	
Evicted	Lynne; Housemates' choice to evict	Alison; 38.52% to evict	Lee; 84% to evict	Spencer; 55.08% to evict	Sophie; 85% to evict	Adele; 62% to evict	PJ; 80.7% to evict	Tim; 81.48% to evict	Jonny; 41.95% (out of 2)		
Survived	Jade; Housemates' choice to save	Alex; 38.44% Sandy; 23.04%	Jonny; 16%	Alex; 44.92%	Jonny; 15%	Jade; 36% Jonny; 1% Kate; 1%	Kate; 19.3%	Alex; 18.52%	Kate; 58.05% to win		

Notes

- ^Note 1: Instead of the housemates nominating and the public voting to evict, the public decided whom to nominate and the housemates would decide whom to evict. After the phone lines were opened Sunita decided to walk from the House; her line was therefore closed. Jade and Lynne received the most votes, and the remaining housemates collectively voted to evict Lynne.
- ^Note 2: As a new housemate, Sophie could not nominate and could not be nominated by her fellow housemates.
- ^Note 3: As punishment for discussing nominations, Jade was banned from nominating. As a new housemate, Tim could not nominate and could not be nominated by his fellow housemates.
- ^Note 4: There were no nominations in Week 7. Instead, the Housemates participated in a dilemma – to choose two of their own to receive video messages from home and also to be nominated. After the Housemates could not reach a decision, they drew lots. PJ and Kate were nominated from the draw and received their videos.
- ^Note 5: There were no nominations in the final week. The viewers voted for the housemate they wanted to win, rather than evict.

== Weekly summary ==
Week 1
Week 1	Entrances	On Day 1, Alex, Jonny, Lee, PJ, Sandy, Spencer, Adele, Alison, Jade, Kate, Lynne, and Sunita entered the house.
Week 1	Twists	During the premiere night, host Davina McCall revealed that the public would vote for their least favourite housemates, and the two with the most votes would be up for eviction that week. However, as the public decided the nominees, the housemates themselves would have to choose which of the nominees to evict.
Week 1	Tasks	This week, housemates were not assigned a shopping task, and were automatically given money for their shopping budget.; On Day 5, the housemates were told to each paint one of the dining room chairs however they wanted.
Week 1	Exits	On Day 7, Sunita walked from the house.; On Day 8, Davina revealed that Jade and Lynne had received the most votes and were nominated for eviction. They all unanimously voted to evict Lynne, and she was evicted from the house.
Week 2
Week 2	Entrances	On Day 10, Sophie entered the house.
Week 2	Tasks	On Day 9, the housemates participated in their first live task of the season as part of the Saturday Night Live spin-off. They had to take a general knowledge quiz to win their shopping budget for the week. To succeed, the housemates were required to answer seven out of ten questions correctly. The group successfully completed the task.
Week 2	Punishments	On Day 9, Alison and Kate were reprimanded for discussing nominations.
Week 2	Nominations	On Day 11, Alex, Alison, and Sandy, received the most votes and faced the public vote. Due to being a new housemate, Sophie was exempt from the nomination process.
Week 2	Exits	On Day 15, Alison was evicted from the house receiving 39% of the public vote to evict.
Week 3
Week 3	Tasks	On Day 16, the housemates participated in their live task to determine which housemates would be on the rich side and which would be on the poor side. For their task, housemates had to take turns in trying to shoot a basketball through a hoop. The first five housemates to score would live on the rich side. These housemates were Jonny, Kate, Lee, Sophie, and Sandy. The remaining housemates - Adele, Alex, Jade, PJ, and Spencer - would live on the poor side. Housemates on the poor side would live off basic rations and would only have use of the outside toilet and shower. On the rich side, housemates would be on a large shopping budget, the pool and inside toilet facilities.
Week 3	Punishments	On Day 17, Kate and Spencer were scolded for sharing a kiss across the divide. When Kate gave him beer through the kiss, Big Brother forced her to confiscate six cans of beer from the fridge as punishment.; On Day 19, Kate and Spencer received their first official strikes in the house for crossing the divide.
Week 3	Nominations	On Day 18, Jonny and Lee received the most votes and faced the public vote.
Week 3	Exits	On Day 19, Sandy walked from the house by climbing over the wall in the backyard and escaping.; On Day 22, Lee was evicted from the house receiving 84% of the public vote to evict.
Week 4
Week 4	Entrances	On Day 24, Tim entered the house.
Week 4	Tasks	On Day 23, the housemates were given their next live task. In order to determine which housemates would live on which side of the house, the group had to take turns throwing darts at a dartboard. The housemate with the best score at the end of the task would choose three housemates to join them on the rich side of the house. Alex was the winner of the task and selected Adele, Jade, and Sophie to be on the rich side of the house. This meant that Jonny, Kate, PJ, and Spencer were on the poor side.; Due to the divide in the house, the housemates had to decide which side of the house that new housemate Tim would live on. They ultimately chose for Tim to live on the rich side.
Week 4	Punishments	Jade was banned from making nominations this week after discussing nominations.; On Day 29, Jonny received one strike after crossing the divide.
Week 4	Nominations	On Day 25, Alex and Spencer received the most votes and faced the public vote. Due to being a new housemate, Tim was exempt from the nomination process.
Week 4	Exits	On Day 29, Spencer was evicted from the house receiving 55% of the public vote to evict.
Week 5
Week 5	Tasks	On Day 30, housemates participated in their weekly live task to determine how they would be separated this week. They played a game of musical chairs in the rich bedroom, with one housemate being eliminated each round. The last housemate remaining would select three housemates to join them on the rich side of the house. Alex was the winner of the task and chose Adele, Jade and, PJ to join him on the rich side. Meaning Jonny, Kate, Sophie, and Tim lived on the poor side for the week.; On Day 32, housemates were given a task in which they must learn two dances by the following night. If they were successful, they would win a garden party. The group was successful and passed the task.
Week 5	Punishments	On Day 31, Jade received her first official strike after discussing nominations.
Week 5	Nominations	On Day 32, Jonny and Sophie received the most votes and faced the public vote.
Week 5	Exits	On Day 36, Sophie was evicted from the house receiving 85% of the public vote to evict.
Week 6
Week 6	Tasks	On Day 37, housemates were given the opportunity to take down the divide. Their weekly task was a "Memory Quiz" where they were each asked questions about the house in the diary room. They were told that if they all got their questions right, the divide would be taken down. Kate and Tim were the only housemates to successfully complete the task. Despite this, however, Big Brother gave them a second chance to take the divide down. Kate entered the diary room and was told if she could name all of the housemates in alphabetical order, then the divide would be taken down; failure would result in Kate being moved to the poor side. Kate failed this task and was moved to the poor side, meaning Tim was the only housemate on the rich side.; The housemates were given a task of making sock puppets to represent the fourteen housemates that have appeared on this season.
Week 6	Nominations	On Day 39, Adele, Jade, Jonny, and Kate, received the most votes and faced the public vote.
Week 6	Exits	On Day 43, Adele was evicted from the house receiving 62% of the public vote to evict.
Week 7
Week 7	Twists	On Day 44, the divide in the house was officially taken down, and the "Rich & Poor" twist ended.
Week 7	Tasks	On Day 44, the housemates learned that they must select two housemates to be given a video message from home. In exchange for this, the two selected housemates would be the nominees for eviction, and the nominations on Monday would be cancelled. Kate and PJ were selected by pulling straws.; On Day 47, housemates were given a task, known as "Master and Slave," in which one housemate would be the master and the other would be the slave; the following day, the roles were reversed. Masters could demand slaves to do anything for them, with the slaves having to comply. Following this task, the housemates had to select one housemate who they felt best played the role of the slave; they chose Kate. Kate's reward for being selected was that she received thirty minutes of music played for her in the diary room.
Week 7	Nominations	On Day 44, Kate and PJ faced the public vote.
Week 7	Punishments	On Day 45, Tim was reprimanded by Big Brother for stealing two bottles of alcohol.
Week 7	Exits	On Day 50, PJ was evicted from the house receiving 81% of the public vote to evict.
Week 8
Week 8	Tasks	On Day 51, the housemates were given a quiz about one another as part of their weekly task. Each housemate was separately called to the diary room to answer three questions about their fellow housemates. All of the questions were based on answers given in their application form. For each correct answer, the housemates earned £25 for their shopping budgets and five seconds added on to a phone call with a loved one, which one housemate would receive. Following the task, the group had earned a total of £200 for their budget, and awarded Tim with the phone call from home.; On Day 53, housemates began a new task, which had a roller disco theme. The second bedroom had been converted into a roller disco, and housemates had three minutes to put on their roller blades and pads and get on the floor each time a buzzer sounded. If a housemate failed to achieve this, it would count as a "no-show," and three strikes would mean that the housemates had failed the task. The group later passed the task, and earned a 70's theme party as a reward.
Week 8	Nominations	On Day 53, Alex and Tim received the most votes and faced the public vote.
Week 8	Exits	On Day 57, Tim was evicted from the house, receiving 81% of the public vote to evict.
Week 9
Week 9	Tasks	On Day 57, the housemates were given their final weekly shopping task. The first part of the task was an obstacle course in which they had to complete blindfolded. For the second part, the housemates had to bet a proportion of their money, on an egg and spoon race, and would bid on one of their former fellow housemates to win the race. They were shown a video of Spencer, PJ, Lee, and Sophie racing, and had to bet on which of these housemates the felt would win; they chose to bet on Sophie, who won the race.
Week 9	Punishments	On Day 58, Kate was reprimanded by Big Brother for writing a birthday message to her sister, using make-up.
Week 9	Exits	On Day 64, Jade left the house in fourth place, Alex left the house in third place. It was revealed that Kate was the winner, leaving Jonny as the runner-up.

== House divide ==
Housemate	Week 3	Week 4	Week 5	Week 6
Kate	Rich	Poor	Poor	Poor
Jonny	Rich	Poor	Poor	Poor
Alex	Poor	Rich	Rich	Poor
Jade	Poor	Rich	Rich	Poor
Tim		Rich	Poor	Rich
PJ	Poor	Poor	Rich	Poor
Adele	Poor	Rich	Rich	Poor
Sophie	Rich	Rich	Poor	
Spencer	Poor	Poor		
Lee	Rich			
Sandy	Rich			

Housemate living on 'Rich Side'
Housemate living on 'Poor Side'

== Production ==
=== Auditions ===
The potential housemates applied via home video, successful candidates were invited to further auditions.

=== Presenters ===
Davina McCall returned as host of the weekly eviction show, launch night and finale night. Marcus Bentley narrated the highlight shows, McCall narrated the highlights shown on Friday night, which she did not continue the following year. Dermot O'Leary returned as host of spin-off show Big Brother's Little Brother on E4.

=== Sponsorship ===
The series was the first to be sponsored by the newly named O2, the mobile network had sponsored the previous series however with their old name BT Cellnet.

=== Broadcasts ===
The series premiered on 24 May 2002, on Channel 4. The contestants were recorded 24 hours a day with cameras fixed around the house, and had to wear portable microphones. Big Brother 3 was the first of the main series to feature a live launch. Previously, Celebrity Big Brother 1 had featured a live launch. The launch night saw Davina give a house tour, as well as discuss rumors that had been going on about the series. She then introduced the new housemates, and they entered the house live. Channel 4 broadcast a daily highlights show, and from the first week there was a live eviction show hosted by Davina McCall, where the evicted housemate was interviewed. In the nightly highlight episodes, viewers are shown various highlights of a specific day in the house. Big Brother 3 saw the return of the psychiatrists providing commentary on events in the game, with the episodes featuring them being the highlights show after the most recent eviction. The live eviction episode was held on Friday, with a pre-eviction episode and an official eviction episode being held with a 60-minute gap between them. Live coverage was a major part of E4's schedule for the second year running. The season ended on 26 July 2002, lasting for a total of 64 days. Big Brother 3 saw numerous spin-off series' occur while it was on air. The Saturday Night Live spin-off began this season, and saw housemates competing in live tasks. It would last until midway through Big Brother 5, when it was axed due to poor ratings. Though not introduced this season, the Big Brother's Little Brother spin-off continued throughout this season, giving the show its second season. Following this season, the special What the Housemates Did Next aired, and would later air after every season until Big Brother 9.

=== Eye logo ===
The eye logo for the series was an orange eye with circular shapes evolving from the pupil, with a green background. An homage was paid to this eye in the 22nd series, broadcast 23 years later.

=== Format ===
Over the duration of the series, the housemates are given a series of tasks by Big Brother which test them in many ways. They are also put to the test by their own ideals, prejudices and opinions against other people from different walks of life; something that has survived from the original "social experiment" of Big Brother 1. They live in the communal house and share cooking and cleaning chores among themselves, which usually provides plenty of tension. Housemates are forbidden to sleep during daylight hours (unless unwell) - Big Brother plays the wake-up call persistently in the morning if housemates do not wake up and will play an alarm clock noise into the house if a housemate falls asleep during the day. Housemates must also live by the fundamental rules of Big Brother; if the rules are broken it can result in formal warnings, various punishments or even a housemate's removal from the house. They must wash their own clothes by hand, and they have to make their own bread from scratch. Each week Big Brother sets the housemates a task in order to determine the shopping budget for the following week. They must work together to win the tasks in order to win a luxury shopping budget which changed based on the number of people remaining in the house. If all food runs out in the house, Big Brother provides emergency rations of chickpeas and rice. Housemates are responsible for their own shopping and decide which items the budget will allow them to have. Only a small percentage of the overall budget can be spent on alcohol. Each night, the housemates were also given a discussion topic, and they would have group discussions in the living room.

Much like Big Brother 2, this series featured a twist in the format in an attempt to keep the series interesting. On the first night, it was revealed that all of the housemates were nominated for eviction, and the public then began voting for who they would like to see leave the house. It was later revealed that the two housemates with the highest number of eviction votes would be nominated for eviction, and that their fellow housemates would vote to evict one of them. This resulted in the first eviction of the season occurring on Day 8, the first time that an eviction had occurred this early in the series. Another change in the format this season was the addition of the Rich and Poor sides of the house, in which one side would feature more benefits and luxuries than the other. This season also began using the "strikes" system, in which housemates were allowed to have only three strikes before they were expelled from the series.

This series saw a number of changes and a number of firsts which would continue in future series: it was the first and only series to issue a 'three strikes and you're out' form of disciplinary, all succeeding series have simply issued formal warnings to a housemate who breaks the rules. Big Brother 3 also started the eviction process not being limited to housemate nominations, in Week 1, the public made the nominations and the housemates made the final decision on who would go, in Week 7, two housemates faced eviction simply for being given video messages from home, future series also began experimenting with the eviction process. The first eviction took place a week earlier than the previous two series', rather than wait two weeks to evict a housemate, the first eviction took place just one week after the housemates entered, evictions in the first week have since become common in subsequent seasons. It was the first non-celebrity series to feature a Live Launch Show - although the previous celebrity series featured one. Previously, 10 housemates would enter the house on Day 1, usually with one other housemate arriving later on in the series, Big Brother 3, saw the arrival of 12 housemates on launch night, two housemates left the house voluntarily - this was the first time this happened, but quitting has become more common over the years - both were replaced by standby contestants, making it the first time to feature more than one non-original housemate, again late entry housemates have become more common in subsequent series. Big Brother 3 saw the house divided into 'Rich/Poor' for four weeks, a live task broadcast on Saturday nights would determine which side the housemates would end up living for the week. The Rich/Poor divide was not used again until the ninth series in 2008, where it was renamed Heaven/Hell.

=== House ===
Big Brother 3 was the first series to be filmed at Elstree Studios, where it would operate until 2018; interviews with the housemates took place inside the George Lucas Stage and remained here until Ultimate Big Brother in 2010.

=== Prizes ===
The fourteen housemates in the game are competing for the grand prize of £70,000. Each week, the housemates attempted to complete various tasks assigned by Big Brother in exchange for a weekly budget, which they used to buy food and luxuries; this included buying things such as alcohol and cigarettes. Big Brother 3, much like the previous seasons, did not feature luxury competitions or prizes throughout the season. Big Brother 3 did offer prizes to the housemates such as phone calls and video messages from home.

== House ==
Big Brother 3 saw the series move to a different location, as Newham London Borough Council ordered the complex to be returned to a natural habitat after planning permissions expired in 2002 for the former house. The Big Brother house would be located at Elstree Studios, Borehamwood, Hertfordshire, since Big Brother 3 onwards until 2018. The house this season featured a completely different layout and look when compared to the two previous seasons. The house featured vibrant colors such as reds and oranges for both the walls and the furniture. This house was the first to feature stairs going from the front door to the house. On the launch night, host Davina McCall stated that there were numerous arguments over the sofa in the house, and that the one selected was the third to be placed in the house. The kitchen remained simple, with only necessities such as an oven, fridge, and sink. In the "Diary Room", in which housemates may speak privately and reveal their true feelings to the public, there is a more interesting look to it. The background of the room has the features the Big Brother logo of an eye in the background, with the chair this season is big and bright red. Like the previous editions, there are two bedrooms this season, with Davina referring to one of them as the "uncomfortable bedroom." Like the last season, the men and women chose to sleep in separate bedrooms, though this was not required by the rules. Big Brother 3 saw the return of chickens in the backyard, which was also a feature used in the first two seasons. The chickens were used as a source to get eggs, thus housemates were not required to buy eggs as part of their shopping list. The house also featured a garden, which the housemates used to grow plants and vegetables to eat. This season had a pool in the backyard, making it the first season in which one was provided. Before the season began, there were rumours that a twist this season would see two houses being formed, however, Endemol confirmed that this was just a rumour. During the third to sixth week in the house, there was a large plastic gate separating the Poor and Rich sides of the house.

== Ratings ==
Weekly ratings for each show on Channel 4. All numbers are in millions and provided by BARB.

Viewers (in millions)
	Week 1		Week 2	Week 3	Week 4	Week 5	Week 6	Week 7	Week 8	Week 9
Saturday	–	–	4.53	4.85	5.05	5.15	5.63	5.1	5.28	–
Sunday	–	4.35	4.1	4.19	4.63	5.05	5.16	4.84	5.52	–
Monday	–	4.46	3.17	6.42	6.12	6.38	5.81	6.8	7.04	6.85
Tuesday	–	3.98	5.36	6.3	6.03	6.43	6.65	6.44	6.83	6.95
Wednesday	–	4.98	5.92	6.09	5.55	6.48	7.01	7.07	7.24	7.04
Thursday	–	5.2	4.9	5.45	5.95	6.21	6.45	6.5	7	6.03
Friday	5.97	4.02	4.58	4.99	5.33	5.01	6.3	6.32	5.73	8.54
Friday	5.97	4.99	5.46	6.49	6.6	6.42	7.89	7.45	8.01	10.01
Weekly average	4.74		4.75	5.6	5.65	5.89	6.36	6.32	6.58	7.57
Series average	5.89									

== Controversy and criticism ==
Much like the previous two editions of the series, Big Brother 3 had controversial moments and issues as well. The main issue this season was with housemates voluntarily choosing to leave the game. On Day 7, housemate Sunita chose to walk from the game, stating she "was feeling claustrophobic" and the show had effectively deprived contestants of their rights. Housemate Sandy decided to walk from the game on Day 20. Despite agreeing to leave that night through the door, he later climbed over the wall in the backyard and escaped the house. On his decision to walk, Sandy stated "I went on to the show with no preconceptions. I did what I feel was right and left when I felt it was right to leave." Housemates Lee and Sophie also talked about quitting the series, though neither of them did. The Rich and Poor divide caused numerous issues in the house, mainly when housemate Tim became the only housemate living on the Rich side for a week. The other housemates were upset, with PJ later stating that the group should all walk; however, no housemates left the game due to this issue. The production this season has also been criticized as being too edited, mainly in terms of housemate Jade Goody. This season was also the first to have controversy surrounding sexual relations in the series. Though no actual sexual intercourse occurred in the house, housemate Jade later gave housemate PJ oral sex under the covers, and that same night housemate Sophie was believed to have done the same with housemate Lee. There was a debate on whether or not to show the events occurring on the highlight episode, eventually they chose to show them.
