= Kate Lawler =

English media personality (born 1980)

Katie Lawler
- Born: Katie Louise Lawler; 7 May 1980 (age 46); Beckenham, Bromley, London, England
- Occupations: Television personality; presenter; model; DJ
- Years active: 2002–present
- Television: Big Brother; RI:SE; Celebrity Wrestling; Love Island
- Spouse: Martin Bojtos (m. 2022)
- Children: 1

Kate Louise Lawler (born 7 May 1980) is an English reality television star, model, television presenter and radio presenter. She is best known for becoming the first female winner of Big Brother UK after she won the third series of the show in 2002. Since her appearance on Big Brother, she has presented radio shows on various stations including; Capital FM and Virgin Radio. In 2026, she began co-presenting Big Brother: The Group Chat

== Big Brother UK ==
In 2002, Lawler entered the third series of Big Brother UK. The series lasted 64 days in total, during her time in the Big Brother house she received two warnings out of a possible three for breaking the rules, any housemates who received three strikes would be ejected from the Big Brother house. Her first strike was for discussing nominations with fellow housemate Alison Hammond. Her second strike was for communicating with the outside world for sending a birthday message to her twin sisters. The finale episode of the series was watched in 10.1 million households. Lawler won the series, making her the first woman to win the UK version of Big Brother.

In 2008, Lawler returned to Big Brother, as a hijacker for a day in the spin-off series Big Brother Celebrity Hijack.

Since ITV's relaunch of Big Brother in 2023, Lawler has been a regular panelist on after show, Big Brother: Late & Live.

== Television career ==
In February 2003, Lawler began co-presenting Channel 4 breakfast show, RI:SE until its cancellation in December of that year. In 2006, she began presenting Playdate, a late-night dating show on ITV2. In 2019, she became the competition host for Loose Women.

In 2005, she was a contestant on ITV reality series; Celebrity Wrestling under the ring name "The Brawler", she helped her team, The Warriors, win the tag team championship. She was eliminated in the semi-finals of the individual competitions by model Leilani Dowding. In 2006, Lawler entered Love Island series 2, as a late entrant, she was dumped from the villa a week before the final.

Lawler began appearing on multiple different television shows including; Brainiac: Science Abuse, Rob Brydon's Annually Retentive, Celebrity Hole in the Wall, Celebrity Total Wipeout, Celebrity Coach Trip, Pointless Celebrities and The Weakest Link.

In August 2026, Lawler was announced to be co-presenting Big Brother: The Group Chat alongside GK Barry, a new vodcast accompanying Big Brother on ITV2.

== Radio career ==
In 2002, Lawler became a DJ on Capital FM, she held the position until December 2003.

In 2007, Lawler joined Kerrang! Radio, co-hosting the breakfast show, The Morning After, alongside Tim Shaw. Shaw was suspended from the station in April 2008, Lawler temporarily lead the breakfast show on her own until Shaw's dismissal was officially confirmed. She moved to Drive! in May, Kerrang's midday show, in which she also presented on her own until OJ Borg joined as her co-presenter in October that same year, she became the solo presenter of the show again in October 2009 after Borg departed the show. Lawler was nominated for a Sony Radio Award for Best Entertainment in 2013. Kerrang stopped broadcasting on FM in the West Midlands, and was just broadcast digitally in the summer of 2013, and Lawler was made the official breakfast host. Lawler continued to host the Kerrang Radio Breakfast show each morning until February 2016.

In 2013, Lawler joined Manchester-based radio Key 103. Her show was networked over other northern stations including; Radio Aire, Rock FM and Viking FM. In 2014, Liverpool's Radio City 96.7 also began broadcasting the show. She began to do the shows Sunday through to Thursday. Lawler's last show with Key 103 was in May 2015.

In 2016, she joined Virgin Radio, which launched on 30 March 2016, with Lawler hosting weekday afternoons. In August 2019, Lawler moved to present Drivetime on Virgin Radio. She left Virgin Radio in 2022.

She began a podcast titled Maybe Baby in 2019.

== Modelling career ==
After her appearance on Big Brother UK, she appeared in multiple men's magazines including; Front, Loaded, Nuts and Zoo.

In July 2006, Ann Summers announced that Lawler was the company's new feature model for its lingerie advertisements. She ran the Flora London Marathon in April 2008, wearing only Ann Summers lingerie, raising funds for the Cystic Fibrosis Trust.

== Personal life ==
Lawler is married and has a daughter. She is still close friends with fellow ex Big Brother housemate, Alison Hammond.

== Filmography ==
Film and television
Year	Title	Role	Notes
2002	Big Brother UK series 3	Self; housemate	Winner, 70 episodes
2002	GMTV	Self; guest	1 episode
2003	RI:SE	Self; co-host	22 episodes
2004	Brainiac: Science Abuse	Self	2 episodes
2004	Hell's Kitchen	Self; customer	2 episodes
2005	Big Brother's Most Outrageous Moments	Self; ex-housemate	TV special
2005	Celebrity Wrestling	Self; contestant	4 episodes
2005	Love Island series 2	Self; contestant	3rd place, dumped
2005	This Morning	Self; guest	3 episodes
2005	Dick and Dom in da' Bungalow	Self; guest	1 episode
2006	Rob Brydon's Annually Retentive	Self; cameo	1 episode
2006	Playdate	Self; presenter	
2008	Big Brother Celebrity Hijack	Self; ex-housemate	1 episode
2008	Celebrity Hole in the Wall	Self; contestant	1 episode
2009	Celebrity Total Wipeout	Self; contestant	3rd place, 1 episode
2013	Kiss O'Gram	The Vixen	Short film
2016	Up Late with Rylan	Self; guest	1 episode
2019	Loose Women	Self; competition host	140 episodes
2019	Pointless Celebrities	Self; contestant	2 episodes
2019	Celebrity Coach Trip series 5	Self; contestant	9th place, 7 episodes
2020	Celebs Go Dating	Self; guest	1 episode
2020	Back to the....	Self; guest	1 episode
2020	Celebrity: A 21st Century Story	Self; feature	Documentary
2023	Three Little Worlds	Self; guest	1 episode
2023-2025	Big Brother: Late & Live	Self; ex-housemate	Recurring role, 3 episodes
2025	The Weakest Link	Self; contestant	1 episode
2025	The National Television Awards 2025	Self; guest	TV special
2026–present	Big Brother: The Group Chat	Herself	Co-presenter

== Selected works ==
- Lawler, Kate (2022). Maybe baby. London. ISBN 9781399602389.
