= Erin O'Connor =

English model (born 1978)

Erin O'Connor MBE
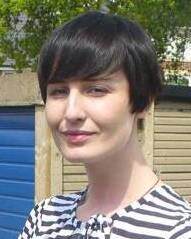
- Born: 9 February 1978 (age 48); Brownhills, West Midlands, England
- Occupation: High-fashion model
- Partner: separated from Stephen Gibson
- Children: 2
- Modelling information
- Height: 1.84 m (6 ft 0 in)
- Hair colour: Black
- Eye colour: Hazel
- Agency: HEROES Model Management (New York) View Management (Barcelona); Mega Model Agency (Hamburg); Priscilla's Model Management (Sydney); Lizbell Agency (Vancouver)
- Website: erinoconnor.co.uk

Erin O'Connor MBE (born 9 February 1978) is a British high-fashion model.

== Early life ==
O'Connor was born and brought up in Brownhills, West Midlands, where she attended Brownhills Community School. She was brought up Catholic and her father is from Ballycastle, County Antrim, Northern Ireland. On a school trip to Birmingham's Clothes Show Live, she was spotted by a talent scout.

== Career ==
=== Modelling ===
Her first published pictures were by Juergen Teller for issue 159. The Undressed Issue issue of i-D in December 1996. She has modelled on the catwalk for John Galliano, Christian Dior, Donna Karan, Prada, Versace, Miu Miu, Jasper Conran, Giorgio Armani, Julien Macdonald, Jean-Paul Gaultier, Chado Ralph Rucci, Badgley Mischka, and Dolce & Gabbana. She has worked with many leading fashion photographers including Patrick Demarchelier, Steven Meisel, Steven Klein, Nick Knight, Mario Testino, David Sims, Bryan Adams, Nadav Kander and featured in magazines including Vogue, W, Elle, Harper's Bazaar, Harpers & Queen, i-D, and Visionaire. She was on the January cover of British Vogue. Since 2005, she has been one of the faces of the British high-street chain Marks and Spencer and in 2008 she launched the haircare line model.me for Toni & Guy, alongside Jamelia and Helena Christensen.

Karl Lagerfeld described her as "one of the best models in the world."

She is signed to Tess Management in London. In 2011, O'Connor's personal assistant, Michelle Knox Brown was convicted of stealing around £12,000 from the model, which she spent on foreign holidays.

=== Television and radio ===
In 2001 she appeared as herself in the "Paris" episode of Absolutely Fabulous. In March 2003, O'Connor was featured in a three-part Channel 4 documentary This Model Life. O'Connor wrote and presented two documentaries on fashion, Erin's Model World and In Search of Beauty, for BBC Radio 4. In April 2009, she appeared as a mentor and judge on the Irish reality TV series The Model Agent for RTÉ Two. In the autumn of 2013, O'Connor appeared on The Face on Sky Living HD alongside Naomi Campbell and Caroline Winberg. The series followed the three as they competed to find and mentor a new 'face' of Max Factor beauty. In September 2026, she appeared as a guest judge on the second episode of season 8 of RuPaul's Drag Race UK.

=== Journalism ===
She writes a column for London Fashion Week paper The Daily Rubbish, contributes a regular blog to the British Vogue online and has written for The Sunday Times and the Daily Mail.

== Other ventures ==
In 2009, O'Connor co-founded All Walks Beyond the Catwalk alongside Caryn Franklin and Debra Bourne. The initiative proposes to challenge the fashion industry's "dependence on unachievable and limited body and beauty ideals". For the launch campaign, O'Connor swapped roles and stood behind the camera for the first time to photograph models holding the slogan 'Size Me Up'.

O'Connor was a spokesperson for the fair-trade charity Traid. O'Connor was an ambassador for the RED initiative. In 2011, O'Connor became an ambassador for Save the Children.

O'Connor launched her own line of fair-trade and eco-friendly cotton T-shirts and bags with stylist Kate Halfpenny. O'Connor is an ambassador for Borne, a medical research charity looking into the causes of premature birth.

== Personal life ==
O'Connor gave birth to her first child, a boy, in 2014. In 2019, she gave birth to a second son.

O'Connor was appointed Member of the Order of the British Empire (MBE) in the 2017 Birthday Honours for services to fashion and charity.
