= Hannah Marshall (visual artist) =

British artist and fashion designer

Hannah Marshall (born 6 July 1982) is a British artist and founder of the experiential art studio H+. She is based in London.

Engineered with minimalist precision, Marshall's practice intersects architecture, science and sound. Building installation art to invite deeper listening and amplify human connection. Marshall's creative DNA is marked by aesthetic and spiritual hybridity. Deploying her signature black and light, she continually explores the relationship between permanence and impermanence, silence and sound.

Marshall grew up in Brightlingsea in Essex and gained a bachelor's degree in Art and Design in 2003 from Colchester School of Art and Design. She then set up her own clothing label ‘’Quiet Noise’’ which ran for ten years; the label won a New Gen award from the British Fashion Council.

In December 2022, Marshall was a guest speaker at FutureSound with spacial audio brand L-Acoustics to speak about the power of sound and the voice.

Marshall has worked for brands including the British Museum, Soho House, the London Borough of Culture, Superblue and RE-TEXTURED (a multi-venue, multi-sensory festival). Since 2012, Marshall has been on the expert council for CoolBrands. She has also worked with music artists including Florence and The Machine, Anna Calvi, Goldfrapp, The xx, Róisín Murphy, Janet Jackson, MØ, Jessie Ware, Nina Kraviz and Savages. She has also taught at the Colchester School of Art and Design.

On 2 January 2017 a post on Instagram from The xx's member Romy Madley-Croft shared Marshall's proposal and engagement. However, they are no longer in a relationship.
