= William Tempest =

British fashion designer

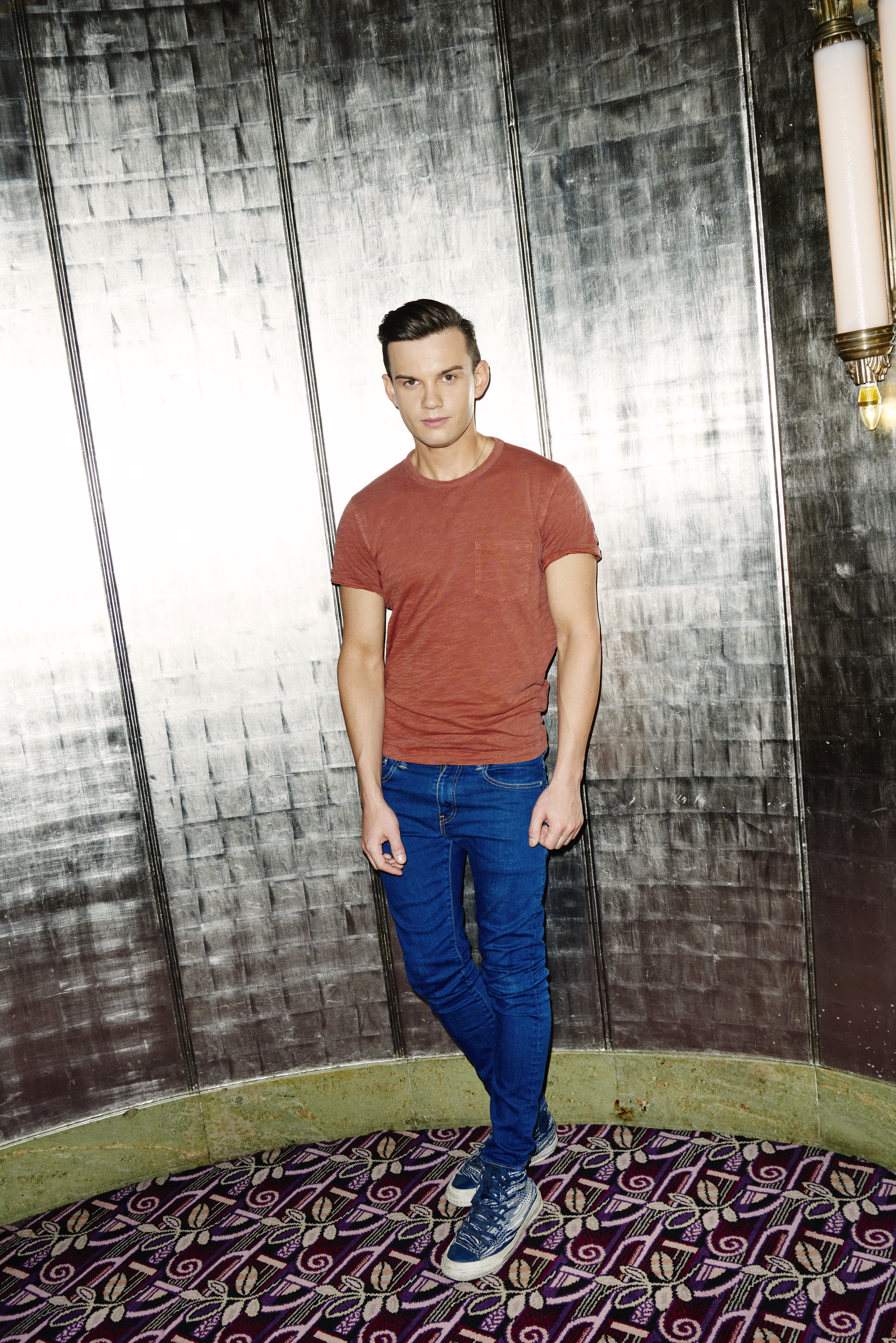
- Education: London College of Fashion
- Label: William Tempest

William Tempest is a British fashion designer.

== Early life ==
Tempest was born in Crewe, UK, and studied for a National Diploma in Fashion Design & Textiles at Mid Cheshire College. He moved to London at the age of 18 to study at the London College of Fashion.

== Career ==
He has worked for designers Giles Deacon in London and Jean-Charles de Castelbajac in Paris. Tempest was selected by Donatella Versace to show his first collection at London Fashion Week, as part of the Fashion Fringe at Covent Garden initiative created by Colin McDowell. The following year he made his debut at New York Fashion Week and received the WGSN Global Fashion Award for Best Emerging Brand & Retailer, and presented to him by Fern Mallis. His collection was immediately picked up by retailers, including Browns and Harrods, London. His designs have been worn by Kate Moss, Rihanna, Victoria Beckham and Emma Watson, among others.

== Collaborations ==
Tempest has been featured in publications such as Vogue, Elle, The Wall Street Journal, GQ, InStyle and i:D, and also featured in The Sunday Times Young Power List. His collaborative projects have included a collection for the high street store River Island; an art installation at London’s Kensington Palace alongside designer Vivienne Westwood; as well as a swimwear collection with W Hotels; and a charity project for Sport Relief. Tempest has also been a judge on Britain’s Next Top Model and curated an exhibition on sustainable urban design with Mercedes-Benz.
