= Beat (charity) =

British eating disorder charity

- Formation: 1989
- Type: Charitable organisation
- Headquarters: Norwich
- Region served: United Kingdom
- Chief Executive: Vanessa Longley
- Website: beateatingdisorders.org.uk
- Formerly called: Eating Disorders Association

Beat is the UK's leading charity supporting those affected by eating disorders and campaigning on their behalf. Founded in 1989 as the Eating Disorders Association, it celebrated its 30th anniversary in 2019.

The charity is dedicated to helping people with anorexia nervosa, bulimia, binge eating disorder, avoidant/restrictive food intake disorder, and other specified feeding or eating disorder, and providing information to the public about these conditions.

== History ==
The charity was founded in 1989 from the amalgamation of the existing UK charities, Anorexic Aid and Anorexic Family Aid. The Society for the Advancement of Research into Anorexia merged with the Eating Disorders Association in 1992. Beat became the Eating Disorders Association's working title in 2007, and was formally adopted in 2018.

== Activities ==
=== Support services ===
As well as campaigning for better services for those affected by eating disorders, the charity provides self-help support through several different projects:

1. Helplines: The charity runs a national helpline for those affected by eating disorders, their families and carers. It can be contacted via telephone, e-mail, webchat and letter. Beat also runs online self-help workshops for those with eating disorders and their families.
2. Online Services: The charity's website provides 24/7 information about eating disorders and how to seek help. It also has educational resources and articles about eating disorders.

=== Campaigning ===
Beat actively campaigns for better services and understanding of eating disorders. Eating Disorders Awareness Week (EDAW) takes place annually.

The charity also develops policies and reports to support people affected by eating disorders and campaign for better treatment.

=== Training and Continuing Professional Development ===
Beat runs conferences and training, providing knowledge, education and training to carers, healthcare and education professionals, and other organisations in both the private and public sector.

It also offers a corporate training package which provides education around supporting colleagues with an eating disorder.

== Impact ==
In the year 2023-2024, Beat's services helped people 70,936 times. 90% of callers to their Helpline said they'd recommend it to a friend and 1.3 million people accessed the charity's eating disorder web pages.

== Funding ==
Beat is funded from a variety of sources – from community fundraising, donations, trusts and grant applications to professional services and government grants.

In 2025, it was awarded £489,980 by the National Lottery Community fund.
