= United Kingdom in the Eurovision Song Contest 2008 =

- Eurovision Song Contest 2008
- Participating broadcaster: British Broadcasting Corporation (BBC)
- Country: United Kingdom
- Selection process: Eurovision: Your Decision
- Selection date: 1 March 2008

Competing entry
- Song: "Even If"
- Artist: Andy Abraham
- Songwriters: Andy Abraham; Paul Wilson; Andy Watkins

Placement
- Final result: 25th, 14 points

Participation chronology

The United Kingdom was represented at the Eurovision Song Contest 2008 with the song "Even If", written by Andy Abraham, Paul Wilson, and Andy Watkins, and performed by Abraham himself. The British participating broadcaster, the British Broadcasting Corporation (BBC), organised the national final Eurovision: Your Decision in order to select its entry for the contest. Six acts competed in the national final and the winner was selected through three rounds of voting.

As a member of the "Big Four", the United Kingdom automatically qualified to compete in the final of the Eurovision Song Contest. Performing in position 2, the United Kingdom placed 25th (last) out of the 25 participating countries with 14 points, making it the second time the nation had placed last in the history of the competition.

== Background ==
Prior to the 2008 contest, British Broadcasting Corporation (BBC) had participated in the Eurovision Song Contest representing the United Kingdom fifty times. Thus far, it has won the contest five times: in 1967 with the song "Puppet on a String" performed by Sandie Shaw, in 1969 with the song "Boom Bang-a-Bang" performed by Lulu, in 1976 with "Save Your Kisses for Me" performed by Brotherhood of Man, in 1981 with the song "Making Your Mind Up" performed by Bucks Fizz, and in 1997 with the song "Love Shine a Light" performed by Katrina and the Waves. To this point, the nation is noted for having finished as the runner-up in a record fifteen contests. Up to and including 1998, the UK had only twice finished outside the top 10, in 1978 and 1987. Since 1999, the year in which the rule was abandoned that songs must be performed in one of the official languages of the country participating, the United Kingdom has had less success, thus far only finishing within the top ten once: in 2002 with the song "Come Back" performed by Jessica Garlick. In 2007, their song "Flying the Flag (For You)" performed by Scooch finished in twenty-second place out of twenty-four competing entries.

As part of its duties as participating broadcaster, the BBC organises the selection of its entry in the Eurovision Song Contest and broadcasts the event in the country. The broadcaster announced that it would participate in the 2008 contest on 21 December 2007. BBC has traditionally organised a national final featuring a competition among several artists and songs to choose its entry for Eurovision. To select its 2008 entry, the broadcaster announced that a national final involving a public vote would be held.

== Before Eurovision ==
=== Eurovision: Your Decision ===
Eurovision: Your Decision was the national final developed by the BBC in order to select its entry for the Eurovision Song Contest 2008. Six acts competed in a televised show on 1 March 2008 held at the BBC Television Centre's Studio 8 in White City, London and hosted by Terry Wogan and Claudia Winkleman. The winner was selected through a professional jury and a public televote. The show was broadcast on BBC One. The national final was watched by 5.1 million viewers in the United Kingdom with a market share of 24%.

==== Competing entries ====
Six finalists were selected to compete in the national final and split into three categories: soloists, girl groups and Joseph v Maria (consisting of the two finalists from the BBC reality television shows Any Dream Will Do and How Do You Solve a Problem Like Maria?). The six artists were announced on 18 February 2008, while previews of the competing songs were premiered during The One Show on BBC One, hosted by Christine Bleakley and Adrian Chiles, between 26 and 28 February 2008.

Artist	Song	Songwriter(s)	Category
Andy Abraham	"Even If"	Andy Abraham; Paul Wilson; Andy Watkins	Soloists
LoveShy	"Mr. Gorgeous"	Oscar Görres; Teresia Bjarneby; Aimee Kearsley; Emma Beard	Girl groups
Michelle Gayle	"Woo (U Make Me)"	Michelle Gayle; Morten Schjolin; Rashelle Davies	Soloists
Rob McVeigh	"I Owe It All to You"	Paul Barry; Mark Read	Joseph v Maria
Simona Armstrong	"Changes"	Simon Ellis; Emma McGettrick; Mari Loretzen; Eleanor Wilson; Caroline Reed	Joseph v Maria
The Revelations	"It's You"	Adam Howorth	Girl groups

==== Final ====
The televised final on took place on 1 March 2008. In addition to their performances, guest performers included previous Eurovision Song Contest winner Katrina Leskanich, who won the contest for the United Kingdom in 1997 as the lead vocalist of the band Katrina and the Waves performing the song "Love Shine a Light".

The winner was selected over three rounds of voting. In the first round, a three-member professional jury selected one song per category to proceed to the second round. The jury consisted of Terry Wogan, John Barrowman (actor, dancer, singer and television presenter) and Carrie Grant (who represented United Kingdom in 1983 as member of Sweet Dreams, vocal coach and television presenter). "Even If" performed by Andy Abraham was selected by Wogan from the remaining three songs to proceed as a wildcard. In the second round, a public televote selected the top two songs to proceed to the final round. In the final round, the public televote selected the winner, "Even If" performed by Andy Abraham.

First Round – 1 March 2008
Category	R/O	Artist	Song	Jury Vote			Total	Result
Category	R/O	Artist	Song	J. Barrowman	C. Grant	T. Wogan	Total	Result
Girl groups	1	LoveShy	"Mr. Gorgeous"			(Note: Terry Wogan did not reveal which song he would have voted for.)	0	—N/a
Girl groups	2	The Revelations	"It's You"	X	X	(Note: Terry Wogan did not reveal which song he would have voted for.)	2	Advanced
Joseph v Maria	3	Rob McVeigh	"I Owe It All to You"				0	—N/a
Joseph v Maria	4	Simona Armstrong	"Changes"	X	X	X	3	Advanced
Soloists	5	Michelle Gayle	"Woo (U Make Me)"	X	X	X	3	Advanced
Soloists	6	Andy Abraham	"Even If"				0	Wildcard

Second Round – 1 March 2008
R/O	Artist	Song	Result
1	The Revelations	"It's You"	—N/a
2	Simona Armstrong	"Changes"	—N/a
3	Michelle Gayle	"Woo (U Make Me)"	Advanced
4	Andy Abraham	"Even If"	Advanced

Final Round – 1 March 2008
R/O	Artist	Song	Place
1	Michelle Gayle	"Woo (U Make Me)"	2
2	Andy Abraham	"Even If"	1

== At Eurovision ==
It was announced in September 2007 that the competition's format would be expanded to two semi-finals in 2008. According to Eurovision rules, all nations with the exceptions of the host country and the "Big Four" (France, Germany, Spain, and the United Kingdom) are required to qualify from one of two semi-finals in order to compete for the final; the top nine songs from each semi-final as determined by televoting progress to the final, and a tenth was determined by back-up juries. As a member of the "Big Four", the United Kingdom automatically qualified to compete in the final on 24 May 2008. In addition to their participation in the final, the United Kingdom is also required to broadcast and vote in one of the two semi-finals. During the semi-final allocation draw on 24 January 2008, the United Kingdom was assigned to broadcast and vote in the second semi-final on 22 May 2008.

In the United Kingdom, the semi-finals were broadcast on BBC Three with commentary by Paddy O'Connell and Caroline Flack, while the final was televised on BBC One with commentary by Terry Wogan and broadcast on BBC Radio 2 with commentary by Ken Bruce. This was the final contest to be commentated by Wogan. The BBC appointed Carrie Grant (who represented United Kingdom in 1983 as member of Sweet Dreams) as its spokesperson to announced the British votes during the final.

=== Final ===
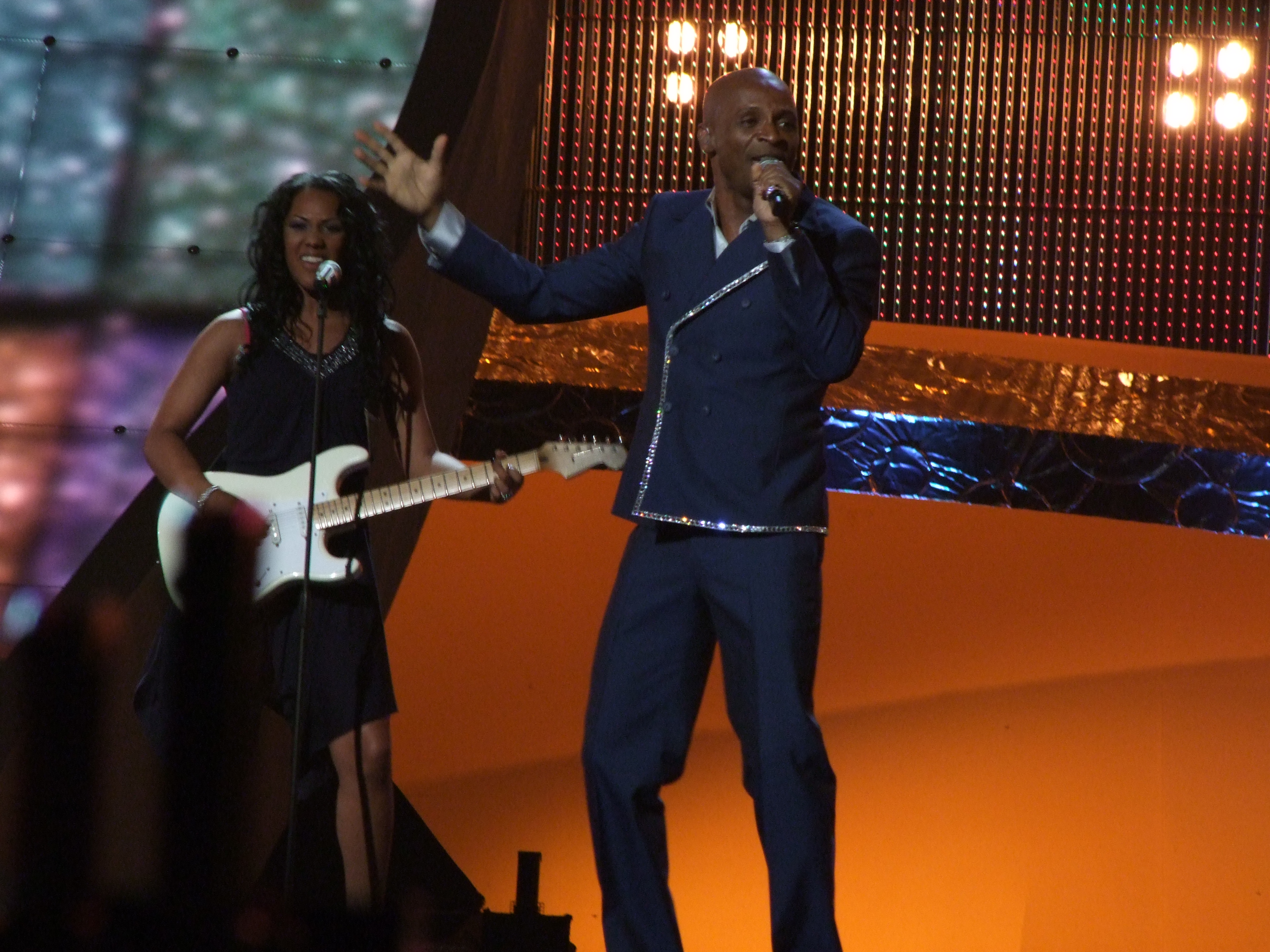
Andy Abraham during a rehearsal before the final

Andy Abraham took part in technical rehearsals on 17 and 18 May, followed by dress rehearsals on 23 and 24 May. During the running order draw for the semi-final and final on 17 March 2008, the United Kingdom was placed to perform in position 2, following the entry from Romania and before the entry from Albania.

The British performance featured Andy Abraham, dressed in a blue suit with silver elements, performing on a predominately gold and brown coloured stage with the LED screens displaying multi-coloured sparkling squares. Abraham was joined by a drummer, two guitarists, a keyboardist and a backing vocalist, all dressed in black with the male performers also wearing white ties. The performance also featured pyrotechnic effects. The United Kingdom placed twenty-fourth (last) in the final, scoring 14 points.

=== Voting ===
Below is a breakdown of points awarded to the United Kingdom and awarded by the United Kingdom in the second semi-final and grand final of the contest. The nation awarded its 12 points to Cyprus in the semi-final and to Greece in the final of the contest.

==== Points awarded to the United Kingdom ====
Points awarded to the United Kingdom (Final)
Score	Country
12 points	
10 points	
8 points	Ireland
7 points	
6 points	San Marino
5 points	
4 points	
3 points	
2 points	
1 point	

==== Points awarded by the United Kingdom ====
Points awarded by the United Kingdom (Semi-final 2)
Score	Country
12 points	Cyprus
10 points	Turkey
8 points	Lithuania
7 points	Portugal
6 points	Sweden
5 points	Latvia
4 points	Iceland
3 points	Albania
2 points	Malta
1 point	Denmark

Points awarded by the United Kingdom (Final)
Score	Country
12 points	Greece
10 points	Latvia
8 points	Turkey
7 points	Norway
6 points	Iceland
5 points	Ukraine
4 points	Poland
3 points	Denmark
2 points	France
1 point	Spain

== After Eurovision ==
During the Eurovision final, commentator Terry Wogan expressed frustration with the result, having called Andy Abraham and his song "the best UK entry for a while". Right before the winner’s reprise, he said “… and possibly goodbye, Europe”. The suggestion that the United Kingdom should follow Italy's suit and no longer enter the competition was also made. In Wogan's radio show on 27 May 2008, he remarked on a conversation with Abraham who had said that he was not expecting many points due to bloc voting and another reason which Wogan was not prepared to discuss on air, presumed to be related to his race. Swedish group BWO, which revealed during an interview that they had previously been approached to compete in a British national final but refused as they were not allowed to write their own song, stated that if the United Kingdom put in more effort they can win the contest.

Following the 2008 contest, Wogan resigned as a commentator, and was replaced by Graham Norton in 2009.
