= Natalie Powers =

English singer

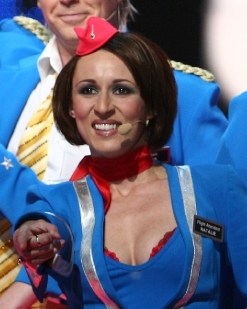
- Powers performing at Eurovision 2007

Background information
- Born: Natalie Powers; Sutton Coldfield, Birmingham, England
- Genres: Pop, bubblegum, trance
- Occupation: Singer
- Years active: 1998–present
- Labels: EMI, Almighty, Warner Bros.
- Member of: Scooch

Natalie Powers is an English singer. She is the lead vocalist of the pop group Scooch, who represented the United Kingdom in the Eurovision Song Contest 2007.

== Early career ==
Natalie Powers began acting at the age of seven when she played the youngest orphan in the first run of the hit musical Annie. Natalie was brought up with her two brothers in Sutton Coldfield in Birmingham. Natalie's parents, Peter and Gloria, recognised her talent and took her to audition for the lead role in Annie. Natalie toured around the country and between the ages of seven and 14 she starred in a number of musicals and pantomimes.

Natalie left school at 16 and moved to London to further her study. Upon leaving college, Natalie moved into the West End to take a principal role in Starlight Express at the Apollo Victoria Theatre. She later appeared alongside Kim Wilde in Tommy at the Shaftesbury Theatre before returning to Starlight.

== Scooch ==
It was during this period that Natalie spotted an advert in The Stage newspaper for a new pop act. Natalie was called for an audition and after singing and dancing in front of Mike Stock, she was offered a place in the group. Caroline Barnes, David Ducasse and Russ Spencer completed the group.

After signing a recording contract with Accolade, the pop imprint of EMI, Scooch set about recording their debut single, "When My Baby" featuring Natalie on lead vocals. The song gave Scooch their first top 40 single. The group embarked on an arena tour supporting B*witched and later Five to promote their follow-up single "More Than I Needed to Know". The single was released in January 2000 and entered the top 5.

Scooch's third UK release came in the form of no. 12 reaching, "The Best Is Yet to Come" in June 2000. They were successful overseas also, in other countries such as Japan, where "More Than I Needed to Know" reached no. 1. A fourth single followed in the form of the flamenco inspired "For Sure", which reached no. 15 in the UK singles charts and was followed by the album "Four Sure" which was released in August 2000. At the end of their EMI record contract the group split up.

== Solo years (2001–2007) ==
Natalie gave birth to a son, Michael, in February 2001 and rested for the next couple of months. Describing motherhood as "the most amazing experience of her life", she took time out to relax and travelled to Italy with him and her parents to recuperate.

Meeting with independent dance label Almighty Records in July 2001, it was agreed that they would work with Natalie on some solo material, the result of which was the top 5 single "Music to My Heart", a song which originally appeared on Scooch's debut album and was hailed by many fans as the best song Scooch ever recorded. Natalie embarked on a tour around to promote "Music to My Heart", also performing some old Scooch favorites. The public interest in Pop Idol prompted Almighty to ask Natalie to record a dance version of "Unchained Melody", which was soon to be released by Gareth Gates, one of the finalists. Natalie's version was released in April 2002 and was well received.

While recording "Unchained Melody", Natalie overheard the producers remixing a track which later turned out to be "I Am Who I Am" by Belgian-Sicilian singer Lara Fabian. It was soon reworked by Natalie and was included on Almighty's Definitive Collection album.

In 2003, Natalie's vocals appeared on two underground-trance tracks "Liftin Me Up" and "Over & Over" for production act Echoten and she signed a record deal with Mike Stock's record label Better The Devil, home to the Fast Food Rockers. Although some new tracks were recorded, no singles were released resulting in Natalie and Better The Devil parting company in late 2004.

In 2004, the four original members of Scooch decided to do a mini tour of the UK, peaking at G-A-Y.

In 2005 Natalie was approached by Northerbeat producer Ross Alexander to record an exclusive track for the Gayfest series. Natalie recorded a version of the Maria Vidal classic "Body Rock".

In the summer of 2006, Natalie was asked to record for a new compilation album Forever Bond which consists of remixes of classic Bond themes. Natalie chose to record "For Your Eyes Only" from the film of the same name. The album which also includes the likes of Kelly Llorenna, Angie Brown and Hannah Jones was released in Europe and America in late 2006.

In 2006, Natalie started a business as a vocal coach, working with both established and new acts for stage and screen. In addition, she recorded a number of new club-oriented tracks, including an original track "Drifting Away", written and produced by Saint which was released on the Totally Clubbed Up compilation album in early 2007 via Energise Records.

== Scooch Eurovision Reunion ==
In October 2006, Russ Spencer contacted the other original Scooch members with an idea of recording a new track for the BBC's Making Your Mind Up competition, the winners of which were to represent the United Kingdom in the Eurovision Song Contest. Scooch recorded an original track called "Flying the Flag (for You)", which won the selection competition.

Following the success in the Eurovision selections, the group signed a deal with Warner Bros. Records in the UK and set about recording parts of the song in other European languages. Scooch released their Eurovision single on 7 May 2007 and performed at the Eurovision Song Contest 2007. They finished joint 22nd out of 24 countries, receiving nineteen points; this did, however, include a maximum score of twelve from Malta. The next day, their single reached number 5 in the UK singles UK Top 40.

== After Eurovision ==
Subsequent to their Eurovision exposure, the group embarked on a series of gigs across the UK & Ireland.

Natalie recorded a new track "Shattered Glass", originally a hit for Laura Brannigan which was released as a single via Liberty City Music in the Spring of 2008. The release of this new material along with a new club mix of Flying The Flag saw Natalie on a UK club and Gay Pride tour.

Following this brief return to recording, Natalie has since married and extended her family with the birth of a second son, Max, in December 2008. Throughout 2010 and into 2011, Natalie has now returned to vocal coaching and regularly performs along with the other original members of Scooch at clubs across the UK.

Natalie is currently a singing coach at All Stars Academy, a theatre school in the Hemel Hempstead area which she jointly owns and runs with Amanda Constantinou, She has also recently helped with the vocal coaching in the live action Pinocchio movie with Tom Hanks.
