= Soul Man (album) =

Studio album by Andy Abraham
- Released: 13 November 2006
- Recorded: 2006
- Genres: Jazz, soul
- Label: Sony BMG
- Producers: Brian Rawling, Paul Meehan

Andy Abraham chronology
The Impossible Dream (2006)	Soul Man (2006)	Very Best Of (2008)

Singles from Soul Man
- 1. "December Brings Me Back to You" Released: 11 December 2006

Soul Man is the second album from The X Factor UK series 2 runner-up Andy Abraham. It was released 13 November 2006 and peaked in the UK Album Chart at number 19 with first week sales of 23,505.

== Track listing ==
1. "Still"
2. "What Becomes of the Brokenhearted"
3. "Don't Leave Me This Way"
4. "Ain't No Sunshine"
5. "Just My Imagination"
6. "I Can't Help Myself (Sugar Pie Honeybunch)"
7. "Easy"
8. "Tracks of My Tears"
9. "This Ole Heart of Mine"
10. "Too Busy Thinking 'Bout My Baby"
11. "I'm Gonna Make You Love Me"
12. "Heaven Help Us All"
13. "December Brings Me Back to You" (featuring Michael Underwood) (bonus track)

== Charts ==
=== Weekly charts ===
Chart (2006)	Peak position
Irish Albums (IRMA)	22
Scottish Albums (Official Charts)	40
UK Albums (Official Charts)	19

=== Year-end charts ===
Chart (2006)	Position
UK Albums (OCC)	155
