= Almouzni =

Almouzni may refer to:

- Cyndi Almouzni, French dance pop singer also known by the mononym Cyndi and as Cherie
- Didier Almouzni, French musician best known as drummer and founding member of British power metal band DragonForce
