= For Sure =

For Sure or its variations may refer to:

- For Sure! (Woody Shaw album), 1979
- For Sure! (Kenny Drew album), 1978
  - "For Sure", the title track from the Kenny Drew album
- "For Sure" (song), by Scooch, 2000
- "For Sure", a song by American Football from their self-titled 1999 album
- "For Sure", a song by Carly Rae Jepsen from Dedicated
- "For Sure", a song by Future Islands from As Long as You Are
- "For Sure", a song by Lostprophets from The Fake Sound of Progress
- "Fer Sure", a song by Moka Only from Carrots and Eggs, 2008
