= Sister Mary McArthur =

Sister Mary McArthur is a fictional nun from the fictional convent Saint Peters Of The Sisters Of The Third Removed in Soho. She was created as a cabaret act by the actor, director and radio presenter Tim McArthur.

== Background ==
Sister Mary was created by Tim McArthur in 2003 and first performed in November 2003 at the Jermyn Street Theatre. Since then she has performed at many different festivals and celebrations.

Sister Mary made a television appearance on the BBC 1 programme When Will I Be Famous?, presented by Graham Norton, for whom Tim McArthur had previously been a supporting act. The act was included in Graham's Side Show an irreverent take on some of the acts that weren't selected for the main competition.

Sister Mary McArthur achieved a small cult following when she made a lip sync version of the United Kingdom's 2007 Eurovision Song Contest entry Flying the Flag (for You) originally by Scooch. The band were apparently so impressed with her version, that they invited her along to be part of their new video.
