= The Honeytraps =

British band formed on Boys Will Be Girls

The Honeytraps was the 'girl band' featured in the 2006 reality TV show Boys Will Be Girls, aired on E4.

The programme starting by auditioning male singers (who'd all been in bands before) for a brand new band, to be managed by Olivier Behzadi - ex - Head of A&R Sony Music Intl and Nathan Moore, ex-lead singer of Brother Beyond. It was only once the final four had been selected that the twist was revealed. They were being given the task of trying to pass themselves off as a girl band. One of the four (Marvin Humes of former group VS, now JLS) backed out at this point and was not replaced.

Band member	Previous band	Name in band
Austin Drage	5Boyz	Chloe
Russ Spencer	Scooch	Vanya
Martin Rycroft	Fast Food Rockers	Kennedy

At the end of the series, the band recorded a cover version of the A Flock of Seagulls' track, "Wishing (If I Had a Photograph of You)", which was never released in the stores, but reached a respectable #23 on the UK Download Chart in May 2006.

Since the series ended, Spencer has worked as a TV presenter, took part in the Eurovision Song Contest with a specially reformed Scooch, played the Child Catcher on the Chitty Chitty Bang Bang tour and presented travel news on Radio Jackie. Rycroft initially returned to his bar job in Manchester's Gay Village but since July 2007 has been performing in a boy band tribute act with Michael Pemberton called Boys Aloud. Drage went back briefly to 5Boyz before turning solo. Having auditioned unsuccessfully in 2007, he auditioned again and made it through to the live shows (final 12) in the 2008 series of X Factor but was eliminated on the fourth live show on 1 November 2008.

== Discography ==
- "Wishing (If I Had a Photograph of You)" - #23 UK Download Chart
