= Confessions of a Teenage Drama Queen (soundtrack) =

Soundtrack album by various artists
- Released: February 17, 2004
- Genre: Pop
- Length: 47:28
- Label: Hollywood
- Producers: Matthew Gerrard; Mitchell Leib; Dawn Soler

Confessions of a Teenage Drama Queen is the soundtrack album to the 2004 film of the same name. The soundtrack featured songs by various artists. The film's lead actress Lindsay Lohan recorded four songs written for the film, including "Drama Queen (That Girl)", that was promotionally released with an accompanying video on Disney in January of that year.

== Critical reception ==
Professional ratings
Review scores
Source	Rating
AllMusic	3/5 stars

Michael Paoletta referred to the soundtrack as a "harmless musical companion" to the film, citing Lindsay Lohan's "Drama Queen (That Girl)" and "What Are You Waiting For?" in addition to Cherie's "Ready" as the album highlights. Paoletta was more critical of Lohan's "Don't Move On/Living for the City/Changes" and Atomic Kitten's rendition of "Ladies Night".

== Track listing ==
1. "Drama Queen (That Girl)" - Lindsay Lohan (Pam Sheyne, Bill Wolfe) – 3:29
2. "I'm Ready" - Cherie – 3:22
3. "Ladies Night" - Atomic Kitten featuring Kool & the Gang – 3:06
4. "Perfect" (acoustic version) - Simple Plan – 4:07
5. "Tomorrow" - Lillix – 3:39
6. "What Are You Waiting For" - Lindsay Lohan (Bridget Benenate, Matthew Gerrard, Steve Booker) – 3:19
7. "Na Na" - Superchick – 3:45
8. "1, 2, 3" - Nikki Cleary – 3:28
9. "Don't Move On/Living for the City/Changes" Medley - Lindsay Lohan (Martin Blasick, Stevie Wonder, David Bowie) – 2:22
10. "Boom" - Fan 3 – 3:20
11. "A Day in the Life" - Lindsay Lohan (James Scoggin, Samantha Moore, Kirk Miller) – 3:19
12. "The Real Me" - Alexis – 4:22
13. "Un-Sweet Sixteen" - Wakefield – 2:55
14. "Only in the Movies" - Diffuser – 2:55

Songs featured in the film but not included on the soundtrack album include:

- "Never Leave You (Uh Oooh, Uh Oooh)" by Lumidee, as the musical theme for Carla Santini.
- "Shake Your Coconuts" by Junior Senior, featured when Lola and Ella get ready for the concert in the train to New York.
- "Feel Alright" by ZOEgirl from their album, Different Kind of FREE, featured during the concert after party.
- "Any Other Girl" by NU, previously used to promote American Wedding (2003).
- "Up, Up, Up" by Rose Falcon, featured when Lola and Ella try to find Stu Wolff's house, previously used to promote Disney's Inspector Gadget 2 (2003).
- "Not Done Yet" by Superchick, featured when Lola and Ella were in Stu's bedroom.

== Charts ==
Chart (2004)	Peak position
U.S. Billboard 200	51
U.S. Top Soundtracks	3
