= United Kingdom in the Eurovision Song Contest 2007 =

- Eurovision Song Contest 2007
- Participating broadcaster: British Broadcasting Corporation (BBC)
- Country: United Kingdom
- Selection process: Eurovision: Making Your Mind Up 2007
- Selection date: 17 March 2007

Competing entry
- Song: "Flying the Flag (For You)"
- Artist: Scooch
- Songwriters: Russ Spencer; Morten Schjolin; Andrew Hill; Paul Tarry

Placement
- Final result: 22nd, 19 points

Participation chronology

The United Kingdom was represented at the Eurovision Song Contest 2007 with the song "Flying the Flag (For You)", written by Russ Spencer, Morten Schjolin, Andrew Hill, and Paul Tarry, and performed by the group Scooch. The British participating broadcaster, the British Broadcasting Corporation (BBC), organised a public selection process to determine its entry for the contest, Eurovision: Making Your Mind Up 2007. Six acts competed in the national final and the winner was selected through two rounds of public televoting.

As a member of the "Big Four", the United Kingdom automatically qualified to compete in the final of the Eurovision Song Contest. Performing in position 19, the United Kingdom placed 22nd out of the 24 participating countries with 19 points.

== Background ==
Prior to the 2007 contest, British Broadcasting Corporation (BBC) had participated in the Eurovision Song Contest representing the United Kingdom forty-nine times. Thus far, it has won the contest five times: in 1967 with the song "Puppet on a String" performed by Sandie Shaw, in 1969 with the song "Boom Bang-a-Bang" performed by Lulu, in 1976 with "Save Your Kisses for Me" performed by Brotherhood of Man, in 1981 with the song "Making Your Mind Up" performed by Bucks Fizz, and in 1997 with the song "Love Shine a Light" performed by Katrina and the Waves. To this point, the nation is noted for having finished as the runner-up in a record fifteen contests. Up to and including 1998, it had only twice finished outside the top 10, in 1978 and in 1987. Since 1999, the year in which the rule was abandoned that songs must be performed in one of the official languages of the country participating, it has had less success, thus far only finishing within the top ten once: in 2002 with the song "Come Back" performed by Jessica Garlick. In 2006, "Teenage Life" performed by Daz Sampson finished in nineteenth place out of twenty-four competing entries.

As part of its duties as participating broadcaster, the BBC organises the selection of its entry in the Eurovision Song Contest and broadcasts the event in the country. The broadcaster announced that it would participate in the 2007 contest on 16 October 2006. The BBC has traditionally organised a national final featuring a competition among several artists and songs to choose its entry for Eurovision. For its 2007 entry, the broadcaster announced that it would held a national final involving a public vote to select its entry.

== Before Eurovision ==
=== Eurovision: Making Your Mind Up 2007 ===
Eurovision: Making Your Mind Up 2007 was the national final developed by the BBC in order to select its entry for the Eurovision Song Contest 2007. Six acts competed in a televised show on 17 March 2007 held at the Maidstone Studios in Maidstone, Kent and hosted by Terry Wogan and Fearne Cotton. The winner was selected entirely through a public vote. The show was broadcast on BBC One. The first part of the national final was watched by 5.1 million viewers in the United Kingdom with a market share of 22.6%, while the second part was watched by 5.6 million viewers in the United Kingdom with a market share of 25.7%.

==== Competing entries ====
Entries were provided to the BBC by record labels and music industry experts including writers and producers. Among the acts rumoured by British media to have been consulted by the BBC with for entry submissions and involvement in the national final included Ace of Base, Daz Sampson (who represented the United Kingdom in 2006) with Carol Decker, Morrissey, Queentastic, Scissor Sisters, and The Puppini Sisters. Six finalists were selected to compete in the national final, which were announced during a press conference on 28 February 2007.

==== Final ====
Six acts competed in the televised final on 17 March 2007. In addition to their performances, the guest performer was Lordi, who won Eurovision for Finland in 2006 with the song "Hard Rock Hallelujah". A panel of experts provided feedback regarding the songs during the show. The panel consisted of John Barrowman (actor, dancer, singer, and television presenter) and Mel Giedroyc (actress, comedian, and television presenter). An additional panel consisting of members from all participating countries at the Eurovision Song Contest 2007 voted for their favourite song, with Big Brovaz winning the vote followed by Cyndi.

The winner was selected over two rounds of public televoting. In the first round, the top two songs proceeded to the second round. In the second round, the winner, "Flying the Flag (for You)" performed by Scooch, was selected.

First Round – 17 March 2007
R/O	Artist	Song	Songwriter(s)	Place
1	Liz McClarnon	"(Don't It Make You) Happy!"	John McLaughlin; Simon Perry; Liz McClarnon; Dave Thomas	5
2	Brian Harvey	"I Can"	Conner Reeves; Grant Mitchell	6
3	Big Brovaz	"Big Bro Thang"	Nadia Shepherd; Cherise Roberts; John-Paul Horsley; Michael Brown	3
4	Cyndi	"I'll Leave My Heart"	Henry Gorman; Paul Mosel	Advanced
5	Scooch	"Flying the Flag (for You)"	Russ Spencer; Morten Schjolin; Andrew Hill; Paul Tarry	Advanced
6	Justin Hawkins and Beverlei Brown	"They Don't Make 'Em Like They Used To"	Justin Hawkins	4

Second Round – 17 March 2007
R/O	Artist	Song	Televote	Place
1	Cyndi	"I'll Leave My Heart"	46%	2
2	Scooch	"Flying the Flag (for You)"	54%	1

=== Controversy ===
During the winner's announcement of the national final, Terry Wogan revealed the winner to be Cyndi while Fearne Cotton simultaneously revealed the winner to be Scooch. Many people believed Cyndi was the winner as Wogan's announcement was louder than Cotton's, however it was confirmed seconds later that Scooch were the winners. The BBC would later issue a written apology, blaming the blunder on "live TV".

Following the national final, several contestants voiced their dissatisfaction with the final result. Justin Hawkins, who immediately left the studio after failing to qualify for the second voting round, accused viewers for being "racist or stupid" for not voting for him and Big Brovaz due to the race of the group members and his duet partner Beverlei Brown. Accusations were also made by Big Brovaz, Brian Harvey and Hawkins that Scooch had duped the public into voting for them by miming their song and failing to show their two backing vocalists on stage with the purpose of boosting their performance. The group later denied the miming claims with their spokesman Andrew Hill accusing the acts of "sour grapes", while a BBC spokeswoman stated that "Scooch won fair and square in a vote by the British public". The BBC Head of Entertainment also released a statement clarifying that the show had "followed EBU rules to the letter" and that "having off-camera supporting singers occurs regularly in TV shows and especially the Eurovision".

== At Eurovision ==
According to Eurovision rules, all nations with the exceptions of the host country, the "Big Four" (France, Germany, Spain and the United Kingdom) and the ten highest placed finishers in the 2006 contest are required to qualify from the semi-final in order to compete for the final; the top ten countries from the semi-final progress to the final. As a member of the "Big Four", the United Kingdom automatically qualified to compete in the final on 12 May 2007. In addition to their participation in the final, the United Kingdom is also required to broadcast and vote in the semi-final on 10 May 2007.

In the United Kingdom, the semi-final was broadcast on BBC Three with commentary by Paddy O'Connell and Sarah Cawood, while the final was televised on BBC One with commentary by Terry Wogan and broadcast on BBC Radio 2 with commentary by Ken Bruce. The BBC appointed Fearne Cotton as its spokesperson to announced the British votes during the final.

=== Final ===
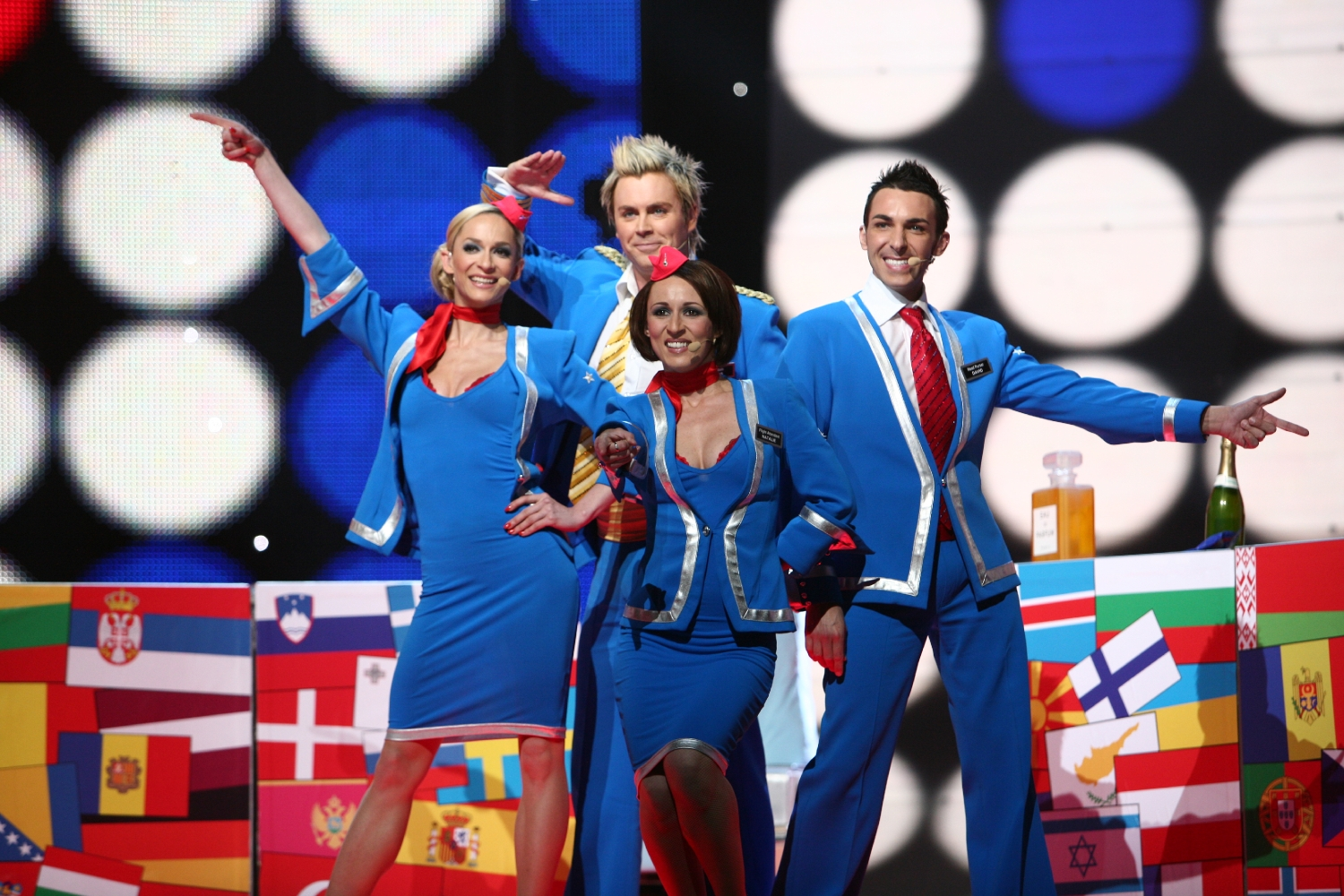
Scooch during a rehearsal before the final

Scooch took part in technical rehearsals on 7 and 8 May, followed by dress rehearsals on 11 and 12 May. During the running order draw for the semi-final and final on 12 March 2007, the United Kingdom was placed to perform in position 19 in the final, following the entry from Ukraine and before the entry from Romania. The British performance featured the members of Scooch, joined by two backing vocalists, performing on a predominantly red, white and blue coloured stage which featured cabin-style props including refreshment trolleys, metal detectors, suitcases and airplane seats, with the LED screens displaying flying white planes and dots. The United Kingdom placed twenty-second in the final, scoring 19 points.

=== Voting ===
Below is a breakdown of points awarded to the United Kingdom and awarded by the United Kingdom in the semi-final and grand final of the contest. The nation awarded its 12 points to Turkey in the semi-final and the final of the contest.

==== Points awarded to the United Kingdom ====
Points awarded to the United Kingdom (Final)
Score	Country
12 points	Malta
10 points	
8 points	
7 points	Ireland
6 points	
5 points	
4 points	
3 points	
2 points	
1 point	

==== Points awarded by the United Kingdom ====
Points awarded by the United Kingdom (Semi-final)
Score	Country
12 points	Turkey
10 points	Cyprus
8 points	Latvia
7 points	Denmark
6 points	Bulgaria
5 points	Serbia
4 points	Hungary
3 points	Poland
2 points	Malta
1 point	Albania

Points awarded by the United Kingdom (Final)
Score	Country
12 points	Turkey
10 points	Greece
8 points	Ukraine
7 points	Sweden
6 points	Russia
5 points	Bulgaria
4 points	Latvia
3 points	Lithuania
2 points	Hungary
1 point	Germany
