= Starfinder =

Starfinder may refer to:

- Starfinder (game show), a British television show
- Starfinder Roleplaying Game, a science-fiction role-playing game by Paizo Publishing
