= December Brings Me Back to You =

Single by Andy Abraham featuring Michael Underwood

from the album Soul Man
- B-side: "Don't Leave Me This Way"
- Released: December 11, 2006
- Recorded: 2006
- Genre: Pop
- Label: BMG
- Songwriter(s): Cliff Masterson, Mark Read, Michael Underwood

Andy Abraham featuring Michael Underwood singles chronology
"Hang Up" (2006)	"December Brings Me Back to You" (2006)	"Even If" (2008)

"December Brings Me Back to You" is the second single from Andy Abraham. It also featured Michael Underwood. It was released in the UK on 11 December 2006. It is a new original track from his second album, Soul Man. It charted at #18 in the UK Singles Chart.

== Track listing ==
1. "December Brings Me Back to You"
2. "Don't Leave Me This Way"

== Charts ==
Chart (2006)	Peak position
UK Singles (OCC)	18
