= Andy Abraham =

British singer (born 1964)

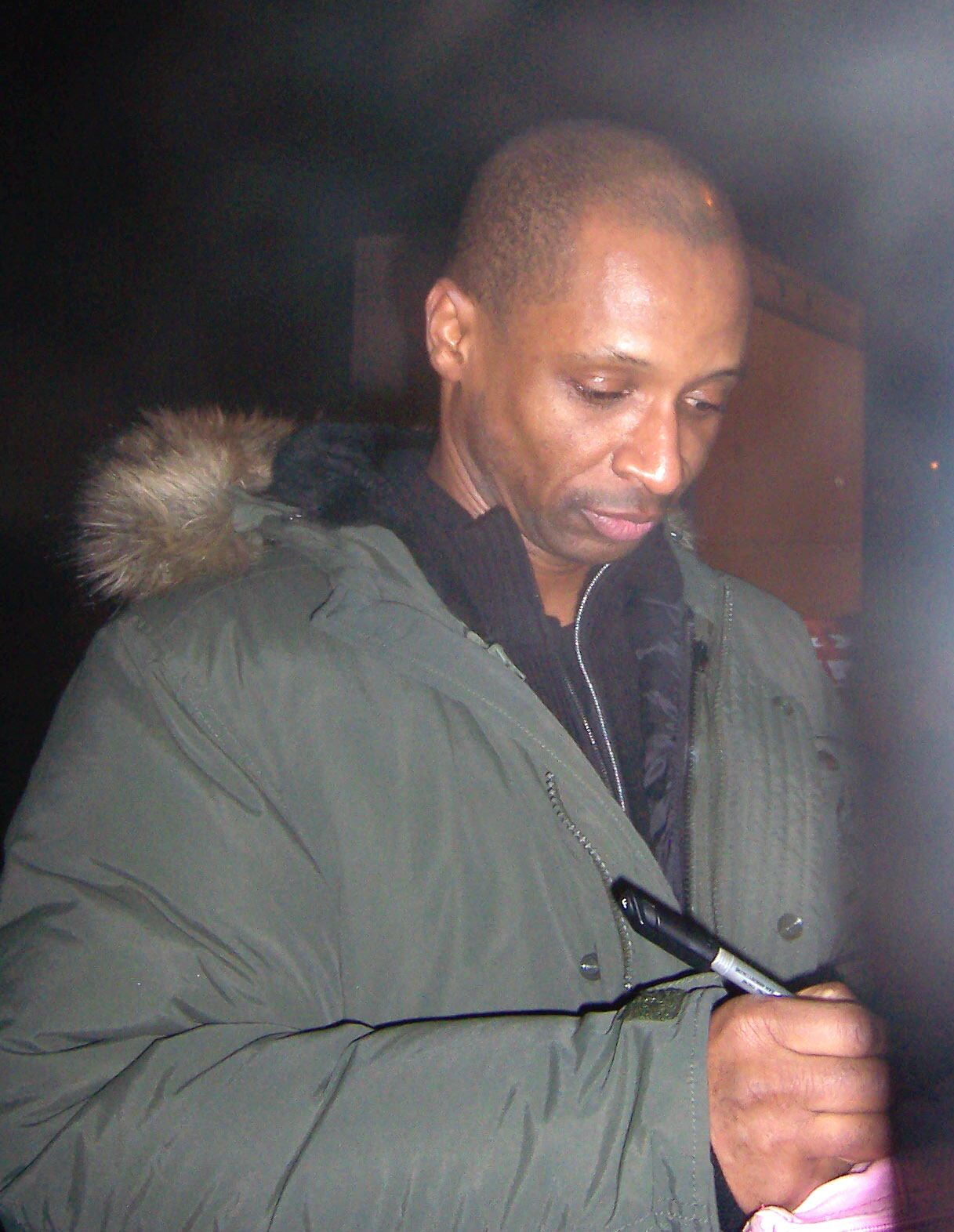
- Abraham signing autographs at The X Factor

Background information
- Born: 17 July 1964 (age 62); London, England
- Genres: Pop; soul
- Occupation: Singer
- Instrument: Vocals
- Years active: 2005–2012; 2015
- Label: Sony BMG (2006–07)
- Website: andyabraham.co.uk

Andrew Abraham (born 17 July 1964) is a British singer. He was the runner-up in the second UK series of TV talent show The X Factor in 2005 to Shayne Ward, and also represented the United Kingdom in the Eurovision Song Contest 2008.

Before applying for The X Factor, Abraham was a refuse collector. Prior to this, he worked as a bus driver for Arriva London North based at Palmers Green bus garage.

== Career ==
=== 2005: The X Factor ===
Abraham was narrowly beaten to the top spot on The X Factor by Shayne Ward by 1.2% of the national public vote. Abraham was mentored throughout the competition by Sharon Osbourne although fellow judges Simon Cowell and Louis Walsh also praised the singer highly throughout the competition. Other performers who came to prominence in the same series of The X Factor were finalists Journey South and quarter-finalist Chico Slimani.

=== After The X Factor ===
On 26 March 2006, Abraham's debut album entered the UK Album Chart at number two, selling 176,000 copies in its first week and being beaten to the top spot by Journey South.

In 2006, Abraham's debut album was the twelfth highest selling album of the year with total sales of around 300,000.

Abraham's second album, Soul Man, was not as popular yet it still managed to make the Top 20 in the UK Charts. The album included the Christmas song "December Brings Me Back To You", a duet with television presenter Michael Underwood.

A Very Best Of album was released in May 2008.

His third studio album, Even If, was released in June 2008 to positive reviews, and its title track reached number 67 in the UK Charts. Album sales were not helped by its distribution company Pinnacle Entertainment (UK) going into administration due to the downturn in the economy. The album was released digitally on iTunes in March 2009.

Abraham released the Christmas single "Oh Holy Night" in December 2009.

On 3 August 2008, it was reported in The Daily Star Sunday newspaper that Abraham had told friends that he would not release any further material, and instead he would concentrate on becoming a property developer. However, on 6 August 2008, Abraham announced on his website that this was not true.

In January 2010 Andy signed up with celebrity management agency Champions (UK) Plc. On 14 March 2010 Andy performed at Arsenal footballer Theo Walcott's 21st birthday party, alongside Beverley Knight.

In 2012 Andy released his fourth album "Remember When", a collection of the songs that influenced him over the years and two new songs. It was released as a book package, with Andy's comments on why he chose each song for the album, some copies also came with an accompanying making of DVD.

=== Eurovision 2008 ===
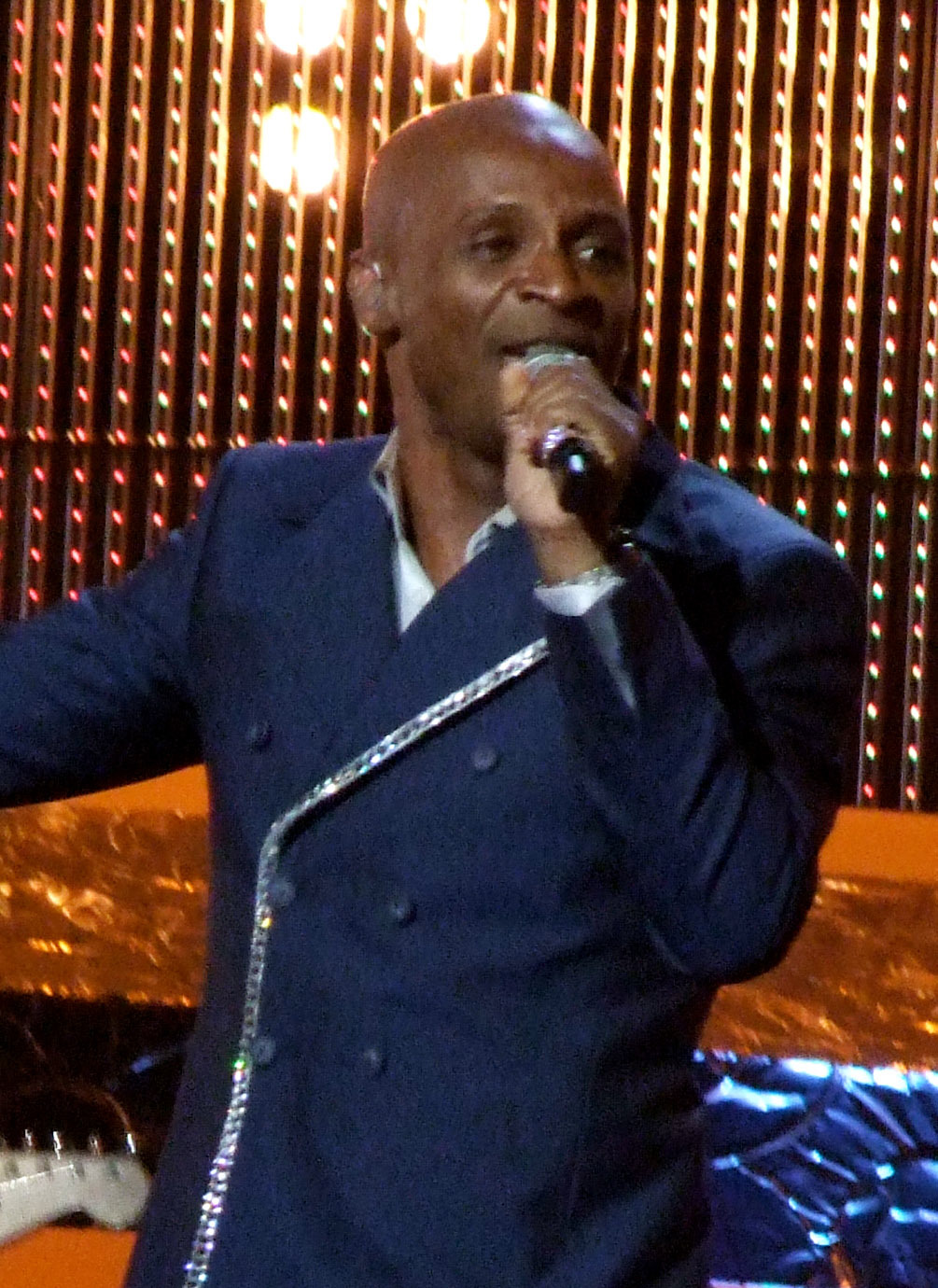
Abraham performing at Eurovision 2008

On 1 March 2008, Abraham won Eurovision – Your Decision 2008, the UK selection for the Eurovision Song Contest 2008, held on 24 May 2008, with his song "Even If". He was selected as a wild card in Eurovision – Your Decision by Terry Wogan and won the contest in a sing-off with favourite Michelle Gayle through a public vote. As one of the 'Big 4' countries, UK automatically qualified for the final on 24 May 2008. In the final, Abraham performed second following Romania and preceding Albania. He came last with only 14 points. Following Eurovision tie-breaking rules, the United Kingdom was placed last overall as it had fewer 12-point votes than Germany and fewer 10-point votes than Poland.

In April 2015, Abraham appeared on stage in the musical Godspell. The show concluded in May.

== Personal life ==
Andy is married and has two children named Tara and Jacob.

Andy returned to working as a binman during the second UK COVID Lockdown and mentioned this in an interview with Metro in November 2020. Detailing the reason why he returned to non-performing forms of work, he said: ‘It’s early mornings, it’s a little bit of helping the community, it’s keeping busy myself, because, as you well know, there is no live work whatsoever out there because of the restrictions.’

== Discography ==
=== Albums ===
Year	Album details	Chart peak positions		Certifications
Year	Album details	UK	IRE	Certifications
2006	The Impossible Dream: Released: 20 March 2006; Label: Sony BMG; Format: CD, digital download	2	1	UK: Platinum
2006	Soul Man: Released: 13 November 2006; Label: Sony BMG; Format: CD, digital download	19	22	UK: Gold
2008	The Very Best Of: Released: 19 May 2008; Label: Sony BMG; Format: CD, digital download	–	–	
2008	Even If: Released: 2 June 2008; Label: B line Records; Format: CD, digital download	–	–	

=== Singles ===
Year	Song	Chart positions		Album
Year	Song	UK	IRE	Album
2006	"Hang Up"	63	14	The Impossible Dream
2006	"December Brings Me Back to You"	18	-	Soul Man
2008	"Even If"	67	-	Even If

Preceded by Scooch with "Flying the Flag (For You)"	United Kingdom in the Eurovision Song Contest; 2008	Succeeded by Jade Ewen with "It's My Time"
