= Coach Trip series 5 =

Coach Trip
- Series 5
- No. of days: 30
- Winners: Maggie & Chris
- Runners-up: Glenn & Becca

Release
- Original network: Channel 4
- Original release: 30 August – 8 October 2010

Additional information
- Filming dates: May 2010 – June 2010

Series chronology
- ← Previous; Series 4 Next → Series 6

Coach Trip 5 is the fifth series of Coach Trip in the United Kingdom which was filmed from May until June 2010 (after the Iceland volcanic ash cloud was dissipating) and aired from 30 August to 8 October 2010. The show's format changed slightly from previous series and with weekends included, from Day 2 of that the couple who received a yellow card the previous day would be immune from the following vote the next day. The series involves seven couples traveling on a one-month tour centering on Northern European countries for the first time, with visits to Denmark, Finland, Sweden, Norway, Latvia and Estonia. Tour guide Brendan Sheerin, coach driver Paul Donald and the MT09 MTT registration all returned for this series, which airs on Channel 4. Dave Vitty was the narrator for the first time. This was the first series to feature couples that lasted for the entire trip.

== Contestants ==
Couple were aboard the coach	Couple got yellow carded	Couple were removed from the coach
Couple were immune from votes	Couple got red carded
Couple left the coach	Couple were not present at the vote

Couple	Relationship	Trip Duration (Days)																													
Couple	Relationship	1	2	3	4	5	6	7	8	9	10	11	12	13	14	15	16	17	18	19	20	21	22	23	24	25	26	27	28	29	30
Maggie & Chris (replaced Sam & Charlie)	Grandmother & Grandson	Not on coach																						Yellow card							Winners on 8 October 2010
Glenn & Becca (original 7)	Best Friends				Yellow card																										Second on 8 October 2010
Amanda & Nicki (original 7)	Best Friends		Yellow card																												Third on 8 October 2010
John & Gwen (replaced Phil & Celia)	Husband & Wife	Not on coach																													Fourth on 8 October 2010
Geoff & Jack (replaced James & Sophia)	Friends	Not on coach																							Yellow card						Fourth on 8 October 2010
Beryl & Janet (replaced Teresa & Katie)	Sisters	Not on coach																	Yellow card												Fourth on 8 October 2010
Kayley & Helena (replaced Carmel & Chris)	Best Friends	Not on coach																									Yellow card		Red card	Eliminated 10th on 6 October 2010	
Phil & Celia (replaced Paula & Miko)	Partners	Not on coach																								Yellow card		Red card	Eliminated 9th on 5 October 2010		
Paula & Miko (replaced Chris & Lauren)	Partners	Not on coach																			Yellow card		Red card	Eliminated 8th on 28 September 2010							
Carmel & Chris (replaced Nick & Mark)	Husband & Wife	Not on coach															Yellow card						Walked 3rd on 27 September 2010								
Sophia & James (replaced Martin & Margaret)	Partners	Not on coach																		Yellow card		Red card	Eliminated 7th on 27 September 2010								
Sam & Charlie (original 7)	Partners											Yellow card						Red card	Eliminated 6th on 21 September 2010												
Chris & Lauren (replaced Timo & Val)	Ex-Relations	Not on coach												Yellow card		Red card	Eliminated 5th on 17 September 2010														
Teresa & Katie (replaced Ray & Glenys)	Mother & Daughter	Not on coach											Yellow card		Red card	Eliminated 4th on 16 September 2010															
Martin & Margaret (original 7)	Husband & Wife										Yellow card				Red card	Removed 1st on 16 September 2010															
Nick & Mark (replaced Yasmin & Neelofer)	Friends	Not on coach								Yellow card				Walked 2nd on 14 September 2010																	
Ray & Glenys (replaced Marg & Mo)	Partners	Not on coach					Yellow card		Red card	Eliminated 3rd on 8 September 2010																					
Timo & Val (original 7)	Partners					Yellow card		Red card	Eliminated 2nd on 7 September 2010																						
Marg & Mo (original 7)	Best Friends					Walked 1st on 2 September 2010																									
Yasmin & Neelofer (original 7)	Cousins	Yellow card		Red card	Eliminated 1st on 1 September 2010																										

== Voting history ==
Indicates that the couple received the most votes and received a yellow card
Indicates that the couple were red carded off the trip
Indicates that the couple left the coach due to other reasons than being voted off or being removed from the coach
Indicates that the couple had received a yellow card the previous day making them immune from any votes
Indicates that it was the couple's first vote meaning they could not be voted for
Indicates that the couple were voted as the most popular couple and won series
Indicates that the couple were voted as the second most popular couple
Indicates that the couple were voted as the third most popular couple
Indicates that the couple were voted as the fourth most popular couple

	Day																													
	1	2	3	4	5	6	7	8	9	10	11	12	13	14	15	16	17	18	19	20	21	22	23	24	25	26	27	28	29	30
Maggie Chris	Not on Coach																		James; Sophia	Carmel; Chris	James; Sophia	Miko; Paula	Nicki; Amanda	Jack; Geoff	Kayley; Helena	Kayley; Helena	Phil; Celia	Kayley; Helena	Glenn; Becca	Winners; 3 votes
Glenn Becca	Martin; Margaret	Timo; Val	Timo; Val	Sam; Charlie	Timo; Val	Ray; Glenys	Timo; Val	Ray; Glenys	Sam; Charlie	Martin; Margaret	Sam; Charlie	Chris; Lauren	Chris; Lauren	Teresa; Katie	Chris; Lauren	Carmel; Chris	Sam; Charlie	Beryl; Janet	James; Sophia	Miko; Paula	James; Sophia	Paula; Miko	Chris; Maggie	Geoff; Jack	Phil; Celia	Helena; Kayley	Phil; Celia	Kayley; Helena	Chris; Maggie	Second; 2 votes
Amanda Nicki	Yasmin; Neelofer	Mo; Marg	Yasmin; Neelofer	Timo; Val	Timo; Val	Ray; Glenys	Timo; Val	Ray; Glenys	Martin; Margaret	Martin; Margaret	Nick; Mark	Teresa; Katie	Chris; Lauren	Teresa; Katie	Chris; Lauren	Carmel; Chris	Sophia; James	Sophia; James	James; Sophia	Miko; Paula	James; Sophia	Miko; Paula	Maggie; Chris	Geoff; Jack	Phil; Celia	Helena; Kayley	Phil; Celia	Kayley; Helena	Glenn; Becca	Third; 1 vote
John Gwen	Not on Coach																											Amanda; Nicki	Chris; Maggie	Fourth; 0 votes
Geoff Jack	Not on Coach																						Beryl; Janet	Glenn; Becca	Phil; Celia	Kayley; Helena	Phil; Celia	Kayley; Helena	Nicki; Amanda	Fourth; 0 votes
Beryl Janet	Not on Coach															Carmel; Chris	Amanda; Nicki	Glenn; Becca	Miko; Paula	Paula; Miko	Glenn; Becca	Paula; Miko	Chris; Maggie	Jack; Geoff	Celia; Phil	Kayley; Helena	Jack; Geoff	Kayley; Helena	Maggie; Chris	Fourth; 0 votes
Kayley Helena	Not on Coach																							Glenn; Becca	Nicki; Amanda	Nicki; Amanda	Jack; Geoff	Nicki; Amanda	Red Carded (Day 28)	
Phil Celia	Not on Coach																							Jack; Geoff	Helena; Kayley	Amanda; Nicki	Jack; Geoff	Red Carded (Day 27)		
Miko Paula	Not on Coach																	Beryl; Janet	Amanda; Nicki	Janet; Beryl	Amanda; Nicki	Glenn; Becca	Red Carded (Day 22)							
Carmel Chris	Not on Coach													Charlie; Sam	Chris; Lauren	Glenn; Becca	Sam; Charlie	Beryl; Janet	James; Sophia	Paula; Miko	James; Sophia	Walked (end of Day 21)								
Sophia James	Not on Coach															Amanda; Nicki	Sam; Charlie	Glenn; Becca	Amanda; Nicki	Nicki; Amanda	Amanda; Nicki	Red Carded (Day 21)								
Sam Charlie	Yasmin; Neelofer	Glenn; Becca	Yasmin; Neelofer	Glenn; Becca	Martin; Margaret	Ray; Glenys	Timo; Val	Ray; Glenys	Nick; Mark	Martin; Margaret	Nick; Mark	Teresa; Katie	Chris; Lauren	Teresa; Katie	Chris; Lauren	Glenn; Becca	Beryl; Janet	Red Carded (Day 17)												
Chris Lauren	Not on Coach								Glenn; Becca	Martin; Margaret	Nick; Mark	Teresa; Katie	Charlie; Sam	Teresa; Katie	Glenn; Becca	Red Carded (Day 15)														
Teresa Katie	Not on Coach									Glenn; Becca	Charlie; Sam	Chris; Lauren	Chris; Lauren	Charlie; Sam	Red Carded (Day 14)															
Martin Margaret	Glenn; Becca	Sam; Charlie	Glenn; Becca	Glenn; Becca	Timo; Val	Ray; Glenys	Timo; Val	Ray; Glenys	Nick; Mark	Sam; Charlie	Chris; Lauren	Katie; Teresa	Chris; Lauren	^{See; Note 1}	Red Carded (Day 14)															
Nick Mark	Not on Coach			Sam; Charlie	Timo; Val	Ray; Glenys	Timo; Val	Martin; Margaret	Sam; Charlie	Amanda; Nicki	Sam; Charlie	Walked (Day 12)																		
Ray Glenys	Not on Coach				Martin; Margaret	Nick; Mark	Timo; Val	Glenn; Becca	Red Carded (Day 8)																					
Timo Val	Glenn; Becca	Martin; Margaret	Glenn; Becca	Glenn; Becca	Amanda; Nicki	Nick; Mark	Charlie; Sam	Red Carded (Day 7)																						
Marg Mo	Yasmin; Neelofer	Amanda; Nicki	Timo; Val	Walked (Day 4)																										
Yasmin Neelofer	Mo; Marg	Amanda; Nicki	Martin; Margaret	Red Carded (Day 3)																										
Walked	none			Marg; Mo	none							Nick; Mark	none								Carmel; Chris	none								
Removed	none													Martin; Margaret	none															
Voted Off	Yasmin; Neelofer; 3 votes	Amanda; Nicki; 2 votes	Yasmin; Neelofer; 2 votes	Glenn; Becca; 3 votes	Timo; Val; 4 votes	Ray; Glenys; 5 votes	Timo; Val; 6 votes	Ray; Glenys; 4 votes	Nick; Mark; 2 votes	Martin; Margaret; 4 votes	Sam; Charlie; 3 votes	Teresa; Katie; 4 votes	Chris; Lauren; 5 votes	Teresa; Katie; 4 votes	Chris; Lauren; 4 votes	Carmel; Chris; 3 votes	Sam; Charlie; 3 votes	Beryl; Janet; 3 votes	James; Sophia; 4 votes	Paula; Miko; 4 votes	James; Sophia; 4 votes	Miko; Paula; 4 votes	Chris; Maggie; 3 votes	Geoff; Jack; 5 votes	Phil; Celia; 4 votes	Kayley; Helena; 5 votes	Celia; Phil; 4 votes	Kayley; Helena; 5 votes	none	

=== Notes ===
- ^1 Martin & Margaret were removed with a red card on Day 14 as they canvassed for votes during the day due to being tired and annoyed with their fellow passengers.

No post-vote arrivals or timekeepers in series

== The trip day-by-day ==
Day	Location	Activity	
Day	Location	Morning	Afternoon
1	Hull	Maypole dancing	Hull aquarium
2	Amsterdam	Canal tour	Burlesque dancing
3	North Germany	Life drawing	
4	Bremen		
5	Hamburg	Submarine visit	Visit to Miniature Hamburg
6	Gothenburg	Fish market	Mini golf
7	Jönköping	Synchronised swimming	Bungee jumping
8	Norrköping	Souffle making class	Fire walking
9	Stockholm	Sightseeing	
10	Nuuksio Park	Folk dancing	
11	Helsinki	Ice hockey	Sauna
12	Tallinn	Stag party pt.1	Stag party pt.2
13	Pärnu	Glass-making	Sports day
14	Cēsis	Medieval games	Skydiving centre
15	Riga	Bobsleigh track (Sigulda)	Caviar tasting
16	Šiauliai	Hill of Crosses	Folk group party
17	Vilnius	KGB Museum	
18	Kaunas	Cookery lesson	Raft building
19	Curonia	Gutting and smoking fish	
20	Klaipėda	Sea museum	Beach scouring
21	Malmö	Rap lesson	
22	Copenhagen	City kayaking	
23	Odense	Hans Christian Andersen museum	
24	Aarhus		
25	Aalborg		Pig farm
26	Norway	Handball lesson	Zip wiring
27	Oslo	Munch museum	
28	Bergen	Fjord tour	Skiing
29	Voss	White water rafting	Abseiling
30	It's the journey home at the end of the current series, Brendan reminisces about the best and the worst of the last 30 days on the road.		
