= The Impossible Dream (Andy Abraham album) =

Studio album by Andy Abraham
- Released: 20 March 2006
- Recorded: 2006
- Genres: Jazz, soul, pop
- Label: Sony BMG
- Producers: Nigel Wright, Greg Curtis, Mark Hudson, Ashley Tabor (exec.)

Andy Abraham chronology
The Impossible Dream (2006)	Soul Man (2006)

Singles from The Impossible Dream
- 1. "Hang Up" Released: March 27, 2006

The Impossible Dream is the debut studio album from The X Factor UK series 2 runner-up Andy Abraham. It was released on 20 March 2006 and entered the UK Albums Chart on 26 March 2006 at number one, selling 176,689 copies in its first week.

== Track listing ==
All tracks produced by Nigel Wright, except "Sticky Situation" produced by Greg Curtis and Mark Hudson.

1. "Hang Up" – 3:46
2. "Me and Mrs Jones" – 4:46
3. "When a Man Loves a Woman" – 3:13
4. "Sticky Situation" – 2:57
5. "Can't Take My Eyes Off You" – 3:27
6. "Greatest Love of All" – 3:32
7. "Where Would I Be" – 4:06
8. "All Around the World" (Northern Line cover) – 2:57
9. "Unforgettable" – 3:42
10. "When I Fall in Love" – 3:51
11. "Lately" – 4:14
12. "If You Ever Go Away" – 4:09
13. "No One Could Love You Half as Much as Me" – 3:41
14. "The Impossible Dream" – 5:12

== Charts ==
=== Weekly charts ===
Chart (2006)	Peak position
Irish Albums (IRMA)	1
Scottish Albums (Official Charts)	2
UK Albums (Official Charts)	2

=== Year-end charts ===
Chart (2006)	Peak position
UK Albums (OCC)	65

== Certifications ==
Region	Certification	Certified units/sales
United Kingdom (BPI)	Platinum	300,000^{^}
^{^} Shipments figures based on certification alone.
