= I'm Ready (Cherie song) =

Single by Cherie

from the album Cherie
- Released: June 19, 2004
- Recorded: 2004
- Genre: Dance-pop
- Length: 3:21
- Label: Atlantic; Lava; WEA
- Songwriter(s): Lukas Burton; Kara DioGuardi; Jamie Hartman; Mick Jones; Sacha Skarbek
- Producer(s): Lukas Burton; Kara DioGuardi; Greg Wells

Cherie singles chronology
"Betcha Never" (2003)	"I'm Ready" (2004)	"Older Than My Years" (2004)

"I'm Ready" is a 2004 English language song by French pop singer Cherie from her self-titled album Cherie. The song sampled the bassline from Foreigner's song "Urgent". This was also used as the opening song for the 2004 film Confessions of a Teenage Drama Queen and it's included in its soundtrack, four months before being released as a single.

== Track listing ==
Single

1. "I'm Ready" – (3:21)
2. "Fool" – (3:40)

"I'm Ready" (The remixes)

1. "I'm Ready" (Dave Audé club mix) – (7:24)
2. "I'm Ready" (Mike Rizzo club mix) – (8:01)
3. "I'm Ready" (Dummies club mix) – (7:47)
4. "I'm Ready" (Silent Nick club mix) – (5:55)
5. "I'm Ready" (Dave Audé dub) – (8:37)
6. "I'm Ready" (Dummies dub) – (7:25)

Maxi CD

1. "I'm Ready" (Dave Aude club mix) – (7:24)
2. "I'm Ready" (Dummies club mix) – (7:47)
3. "I'm Ready" (Dummies dub) – (7:25)
4. "I'm Ready" (Mike Rizzo club mix) – (8:01)
5. "I'm Ready" (Silent Nick club mix) – (5:55)
6. "I'm Ready" (Dave Aude dub) – (8:37)
7. "I'm Ready" (Dave Aude edit) – (3:23)
8. "I'm Ready" (Dummies edit) – (3:23)
9. "I'm Ready" (Silent Nick edit) – (3:28)
10. "I'm Ready" (Mike Rizzo edit) – (3:39)
11. "I'm Ready" (Mike Rizzo Tribal dub) – (8:02)
12. "I'm Ready" (Mike Rizzo Grooveapella) – (7:03)

== Charts ==
It reached No. 1 on the US Hot Dance Music/Club Play chart, becoming her biggest hit.

Chart (2004)	Peak position
US Hot Dance Club Songs (Billboard)	1
US Billboard Hot 100	99
US Pop Songs (Billboard)	33

== See also ==
- List of number-one dance singles of 2004 (U.S.)
- List of artists who reached number one on the US Dance chart
