= For Sure (song) =

2000 single by Scooch

Single by Scooch

from the album Four Sure
- B-side: "Forever We'll Be Strong"
- Released: 24 July 2000
- Genre: Pop
- Length: 3:40
- Label: Accolade
- Songwriters: Mike Stock; Matt Aitken; Steve Crosby
- Producers: Mike Stock; Matt Aitken

Scooch singles chronology
"The Best Is Yet to Come" (2000)	"For Sure" (2000)	"Flying the Flag (For You)" (2007)

Music video
- "For Sure" on YouTube

"For Sure" is a pop song written by Mike Stock, Matt Aitken, and Steve Crosby and performed by British musical group Scooch. With production helmed by Stock and Aitken, "For Sure" was released on 24 July 2000 as the fourth single from Scooch's 2000 debut album, Four Sure, which was issued two weeks later. Caroline Barnes performs lead vocals on the song, describing how she communicates with her love interest during each day of the week except Sunday.

Upon the song's release, music critics responded positively to its composition but questioned the frequent vocoder usage. "For Sure" debuted and peaked at number 15 on the UK Singles Chart on 30 July 2000, becoming the group's last charting single until "Flying the Flag (For You)" in 2007. The song's music video features Scooch in a restaurant discussing Barnes' week, following along with the song's lyrics.

== Composition ==
"For Sure" possess a different sound than the band's usual work, having been described as a "Hi-NRG flamenco" pop track driven by cowbells and sporadically backed up by brass instruments. Lyrically, the song uses a "days of the week" motif, with the narrator describing how she and her love interest interact from Monday to Saturday during the verses. For the chorus, she proclaims her love for her crush, punctuated by the track's "ba-dup-bup-baya-ba-da-bup" hook. Unlike most Scooch tracks, Caroline Barnes sings lead vocals on the track instead of Natalie Powers, who supplies the days of the week. Vocoder effect are used frequently throughout the track.

== Release and chart performance ==
On 24 July 2000, Accolade Records issued "For Sure" as the fourth single from Four Sure, which was released two weeks later. Music website Can't Stop the Pop noted that releasing the single in this manner was a risky manoeuvre, citing the song's dissimilarity with other Scooch tracks and the sizeable impact it had to make to successfully benefit the album, which stalled at number 41 on the UK Albums Chart upon its release. Three formats of "For Sure" were distributed in the United Kingdom: two CD singles and a cassette single. The cassette contains the radio edit of "For Sure" plus B-side "Forever We'll Be Strong", as well as a karaoke version of the former track. The first UK CD replaces the karaoke version with a home movie from Scooch while the second CD, which was issued in Australia on 18 September 2000, contains various remixes of the song plus its video and a photo gallery.

Six days after its release, "For Sure" debuted at its peak of number 15 on the UK Singles Chart, staying within the top 100 for six weeks. Its British sales alone registered on the Eurochart Hot 100, where it debuted and peaked at number 51 on the issue of 12 August 2000. In Australia, the song reached number 181 on the ARIA Singles Chart on 25 September 2000. "For Sure" was the last single Scooch released before their initial split, but it would not be their final charting song in the UK.

== Critical reception ==
Can't Stop the Pop wrote that "For Sure" is a "brilliant" song, calling it a good summer track and highlighting its "frantic" production despite referring to it as a confusing shift in musical direction for the group, especially with Barnes on lead vocals. Reviewing the parent album, Pop Rescue labelled the track a "bouncy party song", calling the melody "catchy" but noting that the vocals sound too "processed" at times, comparing them to the vocals of Cher's "Believe". British trade paper Music Week reviewed the song on 15 July 2000, writing that the song "incorporate[s] every pop cliché" and sounds like an S Club 7 track. In his weekly UK chart review, British columnist James Masterton named the song Scooch's "catchiest" release.

== Music video ==
A music video was made to promote the song. It commences with Powers and Barnes in a restaurant lavatory, where they introduce the song's theme by discussing how Barnes has spent her week. Once the song begins, they exit the restroom and meet up with their male bandmates, David Ducasse and Russ Spencer, at a booth, where Barnes proceeds to tell everyone about her recent affairs. As she does, brief scenes of her working in an office are shown, implying that she met her love interest at work. Eventually, Barnes begins dancing on her seat, to the embarrassment of her colleagues. Interspersed throughout the video are clips of the band performing with their backup dancers in either a colorful room or a grey warehouse. The handclaps used during these interims are not muted.

== Track listings ==
UK CD1

1. "For Sure" (radio edit)
2. "Forever We'll Be Strong"
3. Exclusive Scooch home movie

UK CD2 and Australian CD single

1. "For Sure" (radio edit)
2. "For Sure" (Splash! extended pop 12-inch)
3. "For Sure" (Motiv8 Intrepid vocal club mix)
4. "For Sure" (Motiv8 Intrepid radio version)
5. Enhanced "For Sure" video and picture galley

UK cassette single

1. "For Sure" (radio edit)
2. "Forever We'll Be Strong"
3. "For Sure" (karaoke version)

== Personnel ==
Personnel are taken from the UK CD1 liner notes.

- Mike Stock – writing, production
- Matt Aitken – writing, production
- Steve Crosby – writing
- The M&M All Stars – backing vocals, instruments
- Lin Gardiner – mixing, engineering
- Jeff Kendrick – assistant engineering

== Charts ==
Chart (2000)	Peak position
Australia (ARIA)	181
Europe (Eurochart Hot 100)	51
Scottish Singles Sales (Official Charts)	9
UK Singles (Official Charts)	15

== Release history ==
Region	Date	Format(s)	Label(s)	Ref.
United Kingdom	24 July 2000	CD; cassette	Accolade	
Australia	18 September 2000	CD	Accolade	
