= Michael Underwood =

British television presenter (born 1975)

- Born: Michael Paul Underwood; 26 October 1975 (age 50); Northampton, England
- Occupations: Teacher, television presenter, radio DJ
- Years active: 1999–2006 (presenter); 2020–present (teacher)
- Spouse: Angellica Bell (m. 2010)
- Children: 2

Michael Paul Underwood (born 26 October 1975) is an English television presenter and teacher, best known as a children's TV presenter on CBBC and CITV. He can be seen as a fifteen-year-old in an episode of The Crystal Maze, then presented by Richard O'Brien. He presented the primetime ITV series Let Me Entertain You in 2014 and was a reporter for Real Stories with Ranvir Singh.

== Career ==
Underwood attended Weston Favell Academy in Northampton; he later graduated from the University of Plymouth's Rolle College, Exmouth with a BEd (Hons) in Drama & Performance.

Before winning a six-week CBBC presenting contract on the BBC television gameshow Whatever You Want (broadcast on Saturday 24th April 1999), Underwood had previously made it to the last four in interviews for the Blue Peter vacancy subsequently filled by Simon Thomas.

Underwood was an entertainment correspondent for the ITV Breakfast programme GMTV from 2005 until 2008. In 2006, Underwood duetted with The X Factor contestant Andy Abraham on the Christmas single, "December Brings Me Back To You".

Underwood competed in the 2008 series of Dancing on Ice, partnered by professional skater Melanie Lambert. However, he pulled out of the series following a broken ankle in the run-up to the third show. They took part in the show the following year for the fourth series.

Underwood presented on Heart FM from April 2013, filling in with Zoe Hanson. He left this role in December 2013.

In early 2014, he presented the ITV entertainment series Let Me Entertain You on Saturday nights. Underwood was a reporter on the ITV series Surprise Surprise until 2015 and Real Stories with Ranvir Singh until 2016. He has been a stand-in entertainment reporter on Good Morning Britain multiple times. He is a reporter on the Channel 5 series Do the Right Thing with Eamonn and Ruth.

He appeared in the music video for Wet Wet Wet's single "Too Many People".

In 2020, due to lack of work he announced that he was to retire from presenting and had become a teacher. However he returned to presenting shortly after hosting a single episode of the Channel 4 daytime show 'Tool Club'.

As of September 2024, Michael announced on LinkedIn that he was happy to be starting a new full-time position as a Key Stage (KS)2 Form Teacher, at King’s College School, Wimbledon.

However, he will continue to present his weekend morning show 10am - 2pm on Virgin Radio Chilled. Underwood joined digital station Virgin Radio Groove for its weekend line-up in the 10am-2pm slot after fronting Virgin Radio's 500 Words: Black Lives Matter children's writing competition alongside his wife Angellica Bell.

== Personal life ==
Underwood married his former CBBC co-star Angellica Bell in New York City in December 2010. They have a son and a daughter.

== Filmography ==
TV presenting

- Whatever You Want (1999)
- CBBC (1999–2002) – Continuity presenter
- The Make Shift – Presenter
- CITV (2002–2003) – Continuity presenter
- The White Knuckle Tour – Presenter
- The Big Bang (2002–2003) – Presenter
- Eliminator (2003–2004) – Presenter
- Starfinder (2003–2004) – Presenter
- Jungle Run (2003–2006) – Presenter
- Ministry of Mayhem (2004) – Presenter
- Junior Eurovision Song Contest 2005: British Final presenter (also in 2004)
- Junior Eurovision Song Contest 2005 – Commentator
- British Soap Awards: The After Party (2006, 2009–10) – Presenter
- ITV2 Celebrity Daredevils – "SAS Training"
- It Shouldn't Happen to a Showbiz Reporter (2005) – Showbiz reporter
- GMTV (2005–2008) – Entertainment correspondent
- Bingo Night Live (2008) – Presenter
- Live from Studio Five (2010) – Guest presenter
- The Zone (2010) – Co-presenter
- OK! TV – Guest presenter
- Let Me Entertain You (2014) – Presenter
- Surprise Surprise (2014–2015) – Reporter
- Real Stories with Ranvir Singh (2015–2016) – Reporter
- Good Morning Britain (2016–2017) – Stand-in entertainment reporter
- Do the Right Thing with Eamonn and Ruth (2018–2019) – Reporter
- Tool Club (2021) - Presenter (pilot episode only)

Other TV work

- The Crystal Maze (1990) – Team captain
- Hollywood 7 (2001) – Pizza Delivery Boy
- Dancing on Ice (2008, 2009) – Contestant
- All Star Mr and Mrs (2009) – Contestant, with Angellica Bell
- The Door (2010) – Contestant
- Born To Shine (2011) – Contestant
- Celebrity MasterChef (2012) – Contestant
- Celebrity Mastermind (2012) – Contestant
