= Weston Favell Academy =

Location
- Booth Lane South; Northampton, Northamptonshire, NN3 1CU; England
- 52°15′35″N 0°50′48″W

Information
- Type: Secondary academy
- Motto: Be Inspired, Take Pride
- Department for Education URN: 136948 Tables
- Ofsted: Reports
- Head teacher: Todd Johnson
- Gender: Mixed
- Age: 11 to 18
- Enrolment: 1414
- Website: Weston Favell Academy

Weston Favell Academy is a school in Northampton, England that caters for pupils aged 11 to 18. The academy was called Weston Favell Upper School prior to its takeover by the Greenwood Dale Foundation Trust (GDFT) on 1 September 2011.

== Inspection judgements ==
As the result of an Ofsted inspection in 2016 deeming the school 'inadequate', it was placed in special measures. In 2018 another inspection judged the school to require improvement.

== Notable former pupils ==
- Alan Carr, comedian
- Andrew Collins, broadcaster
- Clive Lewis, politician
- Michael Underwood, broadcaster
- Ivan Toney, footballer
