= More Than I Needed to Know =

2000 single by Scooch

Single by Scooch

from the album Four Sure
- B-side: "Don't Look Back"
- Released: 10 January 2000
- Genre: Pop
- Length: 3:30
- Label: Accolade; EMI
- Songwriters: Mike Stock; Matt Aitken; Steve Crosby
- Producers: Mike Stock; Matt Aitken

Scooch singles chronology
"When My Baby" (1999)	"More Than I Needed to Know" (2000)	"The Best Is Yet to Come" (2000)

Music video
- "More Than I Needed to Know" on YouTube

"More Than I Needed to Know" is a song by British pop group Scooch. The song was written by Mike Stock, Matt Aitken, and Steve Crosby and was produced by the former two. It was released on 10 January 2000 as the group's second single from their debut album, Four Sure (2000), and reached number five on the UK Singles Chart the same month, becoming the band's highest-charting single in their home country. It also reached number 50 in Ireland and number 62 in the Netherlands. A music video made for the song features the four band members searching for pieces of their logo.

== Critical reception ==
Music Week referred to "More Than I Needed to Know" as a "bright and breezy pop tune". Can't Stop the Pop named the song as Scooch's best single, calling it "killer", describing it as "dancefloor heartbreak", and noting the contrast of the song's wistful lyrics with its upbeat production, but criticised the international cover artwork, calling it a "Photoshop disaster". British columnist James Masterton wrote that the song is better than any track on rival British pop group Steps' 1999 album, Steptacular, and retrospectively commented that the song was the "greatest Eurovision Song Contest winner that never was".

== Chart performance ==
On the week starting 16 January 2000, "More Than I Needed to Know" debuted at its peak of number five on the UK Singles Chart, selling 20,900 copies during its first week. The track spent nine weeks on the UK chart and is Scooch's highest-charting single and only top-10 hit in their home country alongside their 2007 Eurovision entry, "Flying the Flag (For You)". In Ireland, the song reached number 50 on 20 January 2000, giving Scooch their first top-50 hit in Ireland. It is the band's only charting single in the Netherlands, where it peaked at number 62 in April 2000 and stayed on the Single Top 100 chart for two weeks. On the Eurochart Hot 100, the song debuted and peaked at number 27.

== Track listings ==
UK CD1

1. "More Than I Needed to Know"
2. "Don't Look Back"
3. "More Than I Needed to Know" (Splash mix)

UK CD2

1. "More Than I Needed to Know"
2. "When My Baby" (Almighty extended remix)
3. "More Than I Needed to Know" (Slewfoot & Grinder mix)
4. "More Than I Needed to Know" (enhanced video)

UK cassette single

1. "More Than I Needed to Know"
2. "When My Baby" (radio edit)
3. "Don't Look Back"

European CD single

1. "More Than I Needed to Know"
2. "More Than I Needed to Know" (Splash mix)

Japanese CD single

1. "More Than I Needed to Know"
2. "More Than I Needed to Know" (Splash mix)
3. "More Than I Needed to Know" (Slewfoot & Grinder mix)

== Personnel ==
Personnel are taken from the UK CD1 liner notes.

- Mike Stock – writing, production
- Matt Aitken – writing, production
- Steve Crosby – writing
- The M & M All Stars – backing vocals, musicians
- Lin Gardiner – engineering
- Jeff Kendrick – engineering assistant
- Pete Hammond – mixing

== Charts ==
Chart (2000)	Peak position
Europe (Eurochart Hot 100)	27
Ireland (IRMA)	50
Netherlands (Single Top 100)	62
Scottish Singles Sales (Official Charts)	5
UK Singles (Official Charts)	5

== Release history ==
Region	Date	Format(s)	Label(s)	Ref.
United Kingdom	10 January 2000	CD; cassette	Accolade; EMI	
Japan	7 June 2000	CD	Accolade; EMI	
