= Coach Trip series 4 =

Coach Trip
- Series 4
- No. of days: 50
- Winners: Ann & Graham
- Runners-up: Caroline & Naomi

Release
- Original network: Channel 4
- Original release: 15 February – 23 April 2010

Additional information
- Filming dates: 7 September – 27 October 2009

Series chronology
- ← Previous; Series 3 Next → Series 5

Coach Trip 4 is the fourth series of Coach Trip in the United Kingdom which that was filmed between 7 September and 27 October 2009 and aired from 15 February to 23 April 2010. The length of this series was longer than the previous or future instalments, increased from 30 to 50 days for a tour centred on European, Mediterranean, North African and West Asian countries on a coach like series 1, 2 and 3 attempting to vote off the least popular couples. Tour guide Brendan Sheerin, coach driver Paul Donald and narrator David Quantick all returned for this series, which aired on Channel 4. MT09 MTT was the registration number plate.

== Contestants ==
Couple were aboard the coach	Couple got yellow carded
Couple were immune from votes	Couple got red carded
Couple won a prize at the vote	Couple were not present at the vote	Couple were removed from the coach

Couple	Relationship	Trip Duration (Days)																																																	
Couple	Relationship	1	2	3	4	5	6	7	8	9	10	11	12	13	14	15	16	17	18	19	20	21	22	23	24	25	26	27	28	29	30	31	32	33	34	35	36	37	38	39	40	41	42	43	44	45	46	47	48	49	50
Graham & Ann	Husband & Wife	Not on coach																																																	Winners
Caroline & Naomi	Friends	Not on coach																																							Yellow card										Second
Nathan & Romane	Friends	Not on coach																																			Yellow card														Third
Jake & Eileen	Mother & Son	Not on coach																																											Yellow card						Fourth
Steph & Vickie	Friends & Groupies	Not on coach																																																	Fourth
Mukesh & Syreeta		Not on coach																																														Yellow card			Fourth
Sam & Donna		Not on coach																																															Yellow card		Fourth
Kim & Gary		Not on coach																																												Yellow card	Red card	Eliminated 19th			
Paul & Rob	Friends	Not on coach																																											Red card	Removed 3rd					
Darren & Miriam	Partners	Not on coach																																										Yellow card	Walked 4th						
Diane & Joan	Friends	Not on coach																																								Yellow card	Red card	Eliminated 18th							
Carla & Angie	Friends	Not on coach																																					Yellow card	Red card	Eliminated 17th										
Vin & Lin	Married Couple	Not on coach																						Yellow card														Red card	Eliminated 16th												
Caroline & Russell	Partners	Not on coach																																			Red card	Removed 2nd													
Sara & Vanessa	Sisters	Not on coach																																	Yellow card	Red card	Eliminated 15th														
Pat & Margaret	Twins	Not on coach																																		Walked 3rd															
Paul & Matt	Best Friends																										Yellow card							Red card	Eliminated 14th																
Ron & Debs	Sibling in-laws	Not on coach																															Yellow card	Red card	Eliminated 13th																
Tom & Dan	Friends	Not on coach																												Yellow card	Red card	Eliminated 12th																			
Gill & Dan	Mother & Son	Not on coach																										Yellow card	Red card	Eliminated 11th																					
Luke & Trish	Mother & Son-in-law	Not on coach																				Yellow card			Red card	Eliminated 10th																									
Lynn & Becky	Mother & Daughter	Not on coach																						Walked 2nd																											
Tam & Jayson	Friends													Yellow card							Red card	Eliminated 9th																													
Mark & Mary	Husband & Wife	Not on coach													Yellow card					Red card	Eliminated 8th																														
Janet & Pat	Friends	Not on coach																Yellow card	Red card	Eliminated 9th																															
Jenna & Jodie	Best Friends																	Walked 1st																																	
Anita & Lloyd	Husband & Wife	Not on coach												Yellow card			Red card	Eliminated 7th																																	
Dean & Jen	Husband & Wife	Not on coach										Yellow card				Red card	Eliminated 6th																																		
Bruce & Jon	Friends	Not on coach											Red card	Removed 1st																																					
Anne & Jenny	Mother & Daughter				Yellow card						Red card	Eliminated 5th																																							
Sel & Sheila	Husband & Wife	Not on coach						Yellow card		Red card	Eliminated 4rd																																								
Brenda & Madge	Friends					Yellow card			Red card	Eliminated 3rd																																									
Carol & Danny	Partners			Yellow card			Red card	Eliminated 2nd																																											
Glenys & Raymond	Partners	Yellow card	Red card	Eliminated 1st																																															

== Voting history ==
Indicates that the couple received the most votes and received a yellow card
Indicates that the couple were red carded off the trip
Indicates that the couple were removed from the coach
Indicates that the couple left the coach due to other reasons than being voted off or being removed from the coach
Indicates that it was the couple's first vote meaning they could not be voted for
Indicates that the couple did not take part in the vote, meaning they could neither vote nor be voted for
Indicates that the couple received a special treat due to being voted as the most popular couple
Indicates that the couple were voted as the most popular couple and won series
Indicates that the couple were voted as the second most popular couple
Indicates that the couple were voted as the third most popular couple
Indicates that the couple were voted as the fourth most popular couple

	Day																																																	
	1	2	3	4	5	6	7	8	9	10	11	12	13	14	15	16	17	18	19	20	21	22	23	24	25	26	27	28	29	30	31	32	33	34	35	36	37	38	39	40	41	42	43	44	45	46	47	48	49	50
Graham Ann	Not on Coach																																			Nathan; Romane	Vin; Lin	Carla; Angie	Carla; Angie	Jake; Eileen	Diane; Joan	Diane; Joan	Jake; Eileen	Jake; Eileen	Kim; Gary	Kim; Gary	Mukesh; Syreeta	Mukesh; Syreeta	Nathan; Romane	Winners; 4 votes
Caroline Naomi	Not on Coach																																						Darren; Mirian	Nathan; Romane	Jake; Eileen	Nathan; Romane	Darren; Mirian	Jake; Eileen	Kim; Gary	Kim; Gary	Jake; Eileen	Donna; Sam	Graham; Ann	Second; 2 votes
Nathan Romane	Not on Coach																																		Vin; Lin	Carla; Angie	Vin; Lin	Carla; Angie	Carla; Angie	Caroline; Naomi	Diane; Joan	Diane; Joan	Caroline; Naomi	Ann; Graham	Kim; Gary	Kim; Gary	Mukesh; Syreeta	Sam; Donna	Caroline; Naomi	Third; 1 vote
Jake Eileen	Not on Coach																																	Vin; Lin	Caroline; Russ	Vin; Lin	Vin; Lin	Darren; Mirian	Graham; Ann	Caroline; Naomi	Diane; Joan	Diane; Joan	Ann; Graham	Ann; Graham	Kim; Gary	Steph; Vickie	Mukesh; Syreeta	Sam; Donna	Graham; Ann	Fourth; 0 votes
Steph Vickie	Not on Coach																																											Ann; Graham	Nathan; Romane	Kim; Gary	Mukesh; Syreeta	Sam; Donna	Graham; Ann	Fourth; 0 votes
Mukesh Syreeta	Not on Coach																																													Kim; Gary	Steph; Vickie	Donna; Sam	Caroline; Naomi	Fourth; 0 votes
Sam Donna	Not on Coach																																														Nathan; Romane	Steph; Vickie	Graham; Ann	Fourth; 0 votes
Kim Gary	Not on Coach																																											Jake; Eileen	Nathan; Romane	Ann; Graham	Red Carded (Day 46)			
Paul Rob	Not on Coach																																						Nathan; Romane	Darren; Mirian	Diane; Joan	Nathan; Romane	Darren; Mirian	^{See; Note 3}	Red Carded/Removed (Day 44)					
Darren Miriam	Not on Coach																																				Vin; Lin	Jake; Eileen	Carla; Angie	Caroline; Naomi	Diane; Joan	Diane; Joan	Paul; Rob	Walked (end of Day 43)						
Diane Joan	Not on Coach																																							Paul; Rob	Nathan; Romane	Nathan; Romane	Red Carded (Day 42)							
Carla Angie	Not on Coach																Pat; Janet	Pat; Janet	Caroline; Russ	Caroline; Russ	Luke; Trish	Lynn; Becky	Vin; Lin	Luke; Trish	Pat; Margaret	Pat; Margaret	Gill; Dan	Gill; Dan	Tom; Dan	Tom; Dan	Ron; Debs	Ron; Debs	Paul; Matt	Sara; Vanessa	Sara; Vanessa	Nathan; Romane	Nathan; Romane	Nathan; Romane	Graham; Ann	Red Carded (Day 39)										
Vin Lin	Not on Coach																					Paul; Matt	Paul; Matt	Luke; Trish	Caroline; Russ	Paul; Matt	Pat; Margaret	Gill; Dan	Tom; Dan	Carla; Angie	Ron; Debs	Caroline; Russ	Paul; Matt	Sara; Vanessa	Jake; Eileen	Nathan; Romane	Jake; Eileen	Red Carded (Day 37)												
Caroline Russell	Not on Coach																	Mark; Mary	Mark; Mary	Tam; Jayson	Carla; Angie	Lynn; Becky	Vin; Lin	Luke; Trish	Pat; Margaret	Pat; Margaret	Gill; Dan	Gill; Dan	Tom; Dan	Tom; Dan	Ron; Debs	Vin; Lin	Sara; Vanessa	Sara; Vanessa	Sara; Vanessa	^{See; Note 2}	Red Carded/Removed (Day 36)													
Sara Vanessa	Not on Coach																															Paul; Matt	Caroline; Russ	Caroline; Russ	Vin; Lin	Red Carded (Day 35)														
Pat Margaret	Not on Coach																					Luke; Trish	Luke; Trish	Luke; Trish	Paul; Matt	Vin; Lin	Tom; Dan	Gill; Dan	Tom; Dan	Tom; Dan	Ron; Debs	Ron; Debs	Paul; Matt	Sara; Vanessa	Walked (end of Day 34)															
Paul Matt	Raymond; Glenys	Raymond; Glenys	Carol; Danny	Jenny; Anne	Brenda; Madge	Carol; Danny	Sel; Sheila	Brenda; Madge	Sel; Shiela	Jenny; Anne	Dean; Jen	Anita; Lloyd	Anita; Lloyd	Mark; Mary	Dean; Jen	Anita; Lloyd	Pat; Janet	Pat; Janet	Mark; Mary	Lynn; Becky	Luke; Trish	Lynn; Becky	Vin; Lin	Luke; Trish	Pat; Margaret	Tom; Dan	Gill; Dan	Gill; Dan	Tom; Dan	Tom; Dan	Ron; Debs	Pat; Margaret	Carla; Angie	Red Carded (Day 33)																
Ron Debs	Not on Coach																													Tom; Dan	Pat; Margaret	Vin; Lin	Red Carded (Day 32)																	
Tom Dan	Not on Coach																								Pat; Margaret	Paul; Matt	Gill; Dan	Pat; Margaret	Pat; Margaret	Pat; Margaret	Red Carded (Day 30)																			
Gill Dan	Not on Coach																									Paul; Matt	Carla; Angie	Tom; Dan	Red Carded (Day 28)																					
Luke Trish	Not on Coach																			Tam; Jayson	Lynn; Becky	Carla; Angie	Vin; Lin	Pat; Margaret	Red Carded (Day 24)																									
Lynn Becky	Not on Coach																Pat; Janet	Paul; Matt	Mark; Mary	Tam; Jayson	Matt; Paul	Luke; Trish	Walked (beginning of Day 23)																											
Tam Jayson	Raymond; Glenys	Raymond; Glenys	Carol; Danny	Carol; Danny	Jenny; Anne	Carol; Danny	Sel; Sheila	Brenda; Madge	Anita; Lloyd	Jenny; Anne	Dean; Jen	Jenna; Jodie	Anita; Lloyd	Mark; Mary	Dean; Jen	Anita; Lloyd	Pat; Janet	Pat; Janet	Mark; Mary	Lynn; Becky	Red Carded (Day 20)																													
Mark Mary	Not on Coach											Dean; Jen	Tam; Jayson	Paul; Matt	Dean; Jen	Pat; Janet	Paul; Matt	Lynn; Becky	Caroline; Russ	Red Carded (Day 19)																														
Pat Janet	Not on Coach													N/A	Mark; Mary	Jenna; Jodie	Paul; Matt	Tam; Jayson	Red Carded (Day 18)																															
Jenna Jodie	Raymond; Glenys	Raymond; Glenys	Carol; Danny	Brenda; Madge	Carol; Danny	Carol; Danny	Brenda; Madge	Brenda; Mage	Sel; Shiela	Jenny; Anne	Dean; Jen	Tam; Jayson	Dean; Jen	Mark; Mary	Dean; Jen	Pat; Janet	Walked (end of Day 16)																																	
Anita Lloyd	Not on Coach							Anne; Jenny	Tam; Jayson	Jenny; Anne	Paul; Matt	Jenna; Jodie	Jenna; Jodie	Mark; Mary	Paul; Matt	Mark; Mary	Red Carded (Day 16)																																	
Dean Jen	Not on Coach									Paul; Matt	Jenna; Jodie	Lloyd; Anita	Tam; Jayson	Mark; Mary	Paul; Matt	Red Carded (Day 15)																																		
Bruce Jon	Not on Coach										Paul; Matt	^{See; Note 1}	Red Carded/Removed (Day 12)																																					
Jenny Anne	Raymond; Glenys	Brenda; Madge	Brenda; Madge	Paul; Matt	Brenda; Madge	Carol; Danny	Brenda; Madge	Brenda; Madge	Anita; Lloyd	Lloyd; Anita	Red Carded (Day 10)																																							
Sel Sheila	Not on Coach		N/A	Jenny; Anne	Brenda; Madge	Carol; Danny	Brenda; Madge	Paul; Matt	Tam; Jayson	Red Carded (Day 9)																																								
Brenda Madge	Jenny; Anne	Raymond; Glenys	Jenny; Anne	Jenny; Anne	Paul; Matt	Sel; Sheila	Sel; Sheila	Jenna; Jodie	Red Carded (Day 8)																																									
Carol Danny	Raymond; Glenys	Raymond; Glenys	Tam; Jayson	Jenna; Jodie	Paul; Matt	Jenny; Anne	Red Carded (Day 6)																																											
Raymond Glenys	Carol; Danny	Tam; Jayson	Red Carded (Day 2)																																															
Walked	none															Jenna; Jodie	none						Lynn; Becky	none										Pat; Margaret	none								Darren; Mirian	none						
Removed	none											Bruce; Jon	none																							Caroline; Russ	none							Rob; Paul	none					
Voted Off	Raymond; Glenys; 5 votes	Raymond; Glenys; 5 votes	Carol; Danny; 3 votes	Jenny; Anne; 3 votes	Brenda; Madge; 3 votes	Carol; Danny; 5 votes	Sel; Sheila; 3 votes	Brenda; Madge; 5 votes	Sel; Sheila; 2 votes	Jenny; Anne; 4 votes	Dean; Jen; 3 votes	none	Lloyd; Anita & Tam; Jayson; 2 votes	Mark; Mary; 5 votes	Dean; Jen; 4 votes	Anita; Lloyd; 2 votes	Pat; Janet; 4 votes	Pat; Janet; 3 votes	Mark; Mary; 4 votes	Tam; Jayson; 3 votes	Luke; Trish; 2 votes	Lynn; Becky; 3 votes	Vin; Lin; 4 votes	Luke; Trish; 5 votes	Pat; Margaret; 4 votes	Paul; Matt; 3 votes	Gill; Dan; 4 votes	Gill; Dan; 5 votes	Tom; Dan; 5 votes	Tom; Dan; 5 votes	Ron; Debs; 5 votes	Ron; Debs; 2 votes	Paul; Matt; 3 votes	Sara; Vanessa; 4 votes	Sara; Vanessa; 2 votes	Nathan; Romane; 3 votes	Vin; Lin; 4 votes	Carla; Angie; 2 votes	Carla; Angie; 3 votes	Caroline; Naomi; 3 votes	Diane; Joan; 5 votes	Diane; Joan; 4 votes	Darren; Mirian; 2 votes	Jake; Eileen; 3 votes	Kim; Gary; 4 votes	Kim; Gary; 5 votes	Mukesh; Syreeta; 4 votes	Donna; Sam; 5 votes	none	

=== Notes ===
- ^1 Bruce & Jon were removed with a red card on Day 12 for breaking the rules regarding verbal and physical abuse as Bruce started to fight Tam & Jayson on the coach, they only arrived on Day 11 making them the shortest timed couple in the series. To raise the group's spirits, Brendan announced that the couple who received the most votes would win a prize. As the vote was tied between Anita & Lloyd and Jenna & Jodie, they had to draw straws to decide a winner which Anita & Lloyd won, however they gave their prize of a luxury stay in a penthouse to Jenna & Jodie.
- ^2 Caroline & Russ were removed with a red card on Day 36 as they canvassed for votes during the day due to being tired and annoyed with their fellow passengers (Nathan & Romane and Jake & Eileen) as they were extremely loud and singing all the way to their first destination.
- ^3 Paul & Rob were removed with a red card on Day 44 as they canvassed for votes during the day due to being tired and annoyed with their fellow passengers and they had to be back in England by Monday.

No timekeepers in series

== The Trip Day-by-Day ==
Day	Location	Activity	
Day	Location	Morning	Afternoon
1	Portsmouth	Visit to the Spinnaker Tower	Sailing on the Portsmouth coast
2	Caen & Bayeux	World War II museum	Archery lesson
3	Le Mans	Go-kart racing	Eating French delicacies
4	Chevreuse & Paris	Horse riding	Can-can lesson
5	Paris	Eiffel Tower	Fencing
6	Chablis	Rock climbing	Wine tasting
7	Dijon	Segways	Mustard making
8	Lausanne	Curling	Medieval castle tour
9	Saas-Fee	Cancelled due to weather conditions	Cable-car trip up the mountain
10	Milan	Visit the San Siro Stadium	Cathedral tour
11	Desenzano del Garda, Lake Garda	Sailing	Ice cream making
12	Bassano del Grappa, Vicenza	Stone carving	Grappa tasting
13	Venice	Gondola lesson	Beach visit
14	Ljubljana		
15	Maribor	River rafting	Rope swinging
16	Graz	Milking cows	Chocolate factory tour
17	Laz/Zagreb	Edible flower making class	Zoo visit
18	Slavonski Brod	Country pursuits	
19	Belgrade	Museum visit	Water-skiing
20	Niš		
21	Devil's Town	World heritage site visit	Spa
22	Sofia (Σοфiα)	Pottery class	Bagpipe lesson
23	Plovdiv (Πλοvδiv)	Cookery lesson	Medieval fighting
24	Edirne (Eδipnε)	Traditional steam bath	
25	Istanbul Part 1 (Iσtαnβυλ pt.1)	Blue Mosque	Grand Bazaar
26	Istanbul Part 2/Western Asia (Iσtαnβυλ pt.2/Wεσtεpn Aσiα)	Boat ride	
27	Istanbul Part 3/Tekirdag (Iσtαnβυλ pt.3/Tεkipδαг)	Golf lesson	Olive oil wrestling
28	Feres (Evros or Magnesia) (Φεpες (Evpoς op Mαгnεσiα)	Bird-watching	Painting lesson
29	Xanthi (Ξάnөh)	Canoeing trip	Mud bath
30	Thessaloniki (Θεσσαλοnίkh)		Cocktail making
31	Volos (Βόλος)		Canyoning
32	Delphi (Δελφοί)		
33	Athens (Αөήnα)	Theme Park	
34	Corinth or Corinthos (Κόpinөος)	Bungee jump	
35	Nafplio/Ouzo (Ναύпλiω/Ωυζω)		
36	Olympia (Ολυmпία)		
37	Patras (Πάtpας)	Go-kart track	
38	(Day XXXVIII) - Matera	Zip wiring	
39	(Day XXXIX) - Amalfi	Paper museum	Limoncello making
40	(Day XL) - Rome Part 1 (Pωmε pt.1)	Gladiator school	
41	(Day XLI) - Rome Part 2/Caserta (Pωmε pt.2/Kασεptα)	Olive oil farm	Mozzarella factory
42	(Day XLII) - Naples/Pompeii (Nαпωλi/Πomпεii)	Pizza making	
43	(Day XLIII) - South West Italy Part 1	Catacombs	Cannoli making
44	(Day XLIV) - Malta/South West Italy Part 2	Vintage tour bus	Honey farm visit
45	(Day XLV) - South West Italy Part 3	Mount Etna	
46	Tunisia Part 1 (Tυniσiα pt.1)	Souk visit	Spa
47	Tunisia Part 2 (Tυniσiα pt.2)	Making Goat head stew	Belly dancing lesson
48	Tυnisia part 3/Libya/Egypt (Tυniσiα pt.3/Λiβyα/Eгyпt)	Quad biking	Visit to an Oasis
49	The Sahara Deserts	Camel riding	Saharan party
50	The Last Day	Brendan looks back at all the activities, tourists and highs and lows of the series.	
