= Cyndi Almouzni =

French pop and dance music singer (born 1984)

- Also known as: Cherie; Cyndi; Cindy Alma
- Born: Cyndi Louise Almouzni; 10 October 1984 (age 41); Marseille, Provence-Alpes-Côte d'Azur, France
- Genres: Pop; dance
- Occupation: Singer
- Instrument: Vocals
- Years active: 2003–present
- Label: Lava (as Cherie)

Cyndi Louise Almouzni (French pronunciation: [sindi lwiz almuzni]; born 10 October 1984), best known at the beginning of her music career in the United States as Cherie, is a French pop and dance music singer coming from Marseille. Her 2004 hit "I'm Ready" hit number one on the Hot Dance Music/Club Play chart.

Later on she performed professionally with her real name Cyndi Almouzni and under her mononym Cyndi, most notably when she took part in the competition for UK entry to Eurovision Song Contest with "I'll Leave My Heart" coming second to the eventual entry "Flying the Flag (For You)" from Scooch.

== Career ==
When she was 14, Cyndi won a local talent contest and entered the national televised contest finals held in Paris. This was the start of her professional singing career. She has performed in many countries, including France, the UK and the US. She signed a worldwide recording contract in the US while continuing her studies.

=== As Cherie ===
Steve Allen, A&R at Sony BMG first discovered Cyndi after hearing her powerful vocals on a dance track recorded when she was just 14 years old. Allen was behind two previous Eurovision entries, Gina G with "Ooh Aah... Just a Little Bit" and the 1997 UK winning Eurovision entry in Dublin with "Love Shine a Light" by Katrina and the Waves.

In 2003, "Betcha Never" (that later appeared in the album Cherie) was used as a part of the soundtrack of the 2003 film Batman: Mystery of the Batwoman. In 2004, Cyndi while signed to Lava Records under the artistic name Cherie, she released a self-titled album she named Cherie which featured the lead-off single "I'm Ready" released in mid-2004. The song sampled the bassline from Foreigner's "Urgent" and made decent headway on the US charts reaching No. 1 on Hot Dance Club Songs in addition to No. 33 on US Pop Songs chart and cracked the Billboard Hot 100 at No. 99.

The follow-up single from the same album Cherie titled "Older Than My Years" was released in September 2004 and charted at Adult Contemporary chart. After these three hits, and aside from one holiday track that was sent to radio ("Merry Christmas Darling") Cherie seemingly disappeared altogether.

Cyndi also guest starred in five episodes of season 4 of the American sitcom One on One as Charlie, the new lead singer of the rock band created by actor Robert Ri’chard's character Arnaz, between 2004 and 2005. In addition to performing with the band, she also sang “I’m Ready” and “I Believe in You,” from her album Cherie.

=== As Cyndi Almouzni / Cyndi ===
Cherie resurfaced in the 2007 BBC selection for the 2007 Eurovision Song Contest, but no mention was made of "Cherie" again as Cyndi reverted to her family name.

On 17 March 2007 Cyndi Almouzni competed in the BBC's Eurovision: Making Your Mind Up contest to decide who would represent the United Kingdom at the 2007 Eurovision Song Contest in Helsinki, Finland. She sang the song "I'll Leave My Heart", which had been produced by renowned Grammy award-winning producer Brian Rawling.

Terry Wogan announced the winner to be Cyndi while, simultaneously, co-host Fearne Cotton revealed the winner to be Scooch. After several seconds of confusion from both contestants, it was revealed that Scooch were the true winners. It was later revealed by the BBC that Cyndi had received 47% of the vote to Scooch's 53%.

Her song was entered into the OGAE Second Chance Contest 2007 competition, and came second. Cyndi was known to be working on album material which was due for release in 2009. She made a comeback in 2012 when in Groovenut EP release. The Ep and the dance hit is "Lose Control" featuring Cyndi (as a mononym).

=== As Cindy Alma ===
In 2013, she released two singles with the Dutch DJ Armin van Buuren, most notably the hit single, "Beautiful Life" and "Don't Want to Fight Love Away". The ongoing collaboration has led to Cindy becoming a featured artist on Van Buuren's "Intense World Tour 2014".

In July 2017, she released a single, "Party Every Day". Then in November 2017, she released a single using the same music but different lyrics with a winter/Christmas theme, "Xmas Every Day".

== Discography ==
=== As Cherie ===
Albums

- 2004: Cherie

Singles

- 2003: "Betcha Never"
- 2004: "I'm Ready"
- 2004: "Older Than My Years"

=== As Cyndi ===
Singles

- 2007: "I'll Leave My Heart"

Featured in

- 2012: "Lose Control" (Groovenut feat. Cyndi)

=== As Cindy Alma ===
Singles

- 2013: "Beautiful Life" - Armin van Buuren featuring Cindy Alma
- 2013: "Don't Want to Fight Love Away" - Armin van Buuren featuring Cindy Alma
- 2016: "Sad Song”
- 2017: "Party Every Day”
- 2017: "Xmas Every Day”
- 2019: "Made of Steel”

== See also ==
- List of number-one dance singles of 2004 (U.S.)
- List of artists who reached number one on the US Dance chart
