= The Revelations =

British girl group

- Origin: London, England
- Genres: Pop; Soul
- Years active: 2005–2008
- Label: Crazy Dancer
- Past members: Annika Magnberg; Sarah Vitorino; Louise Masters

The Revelations were a British-based girl group formed in 2005.

The members were Annika Magnberg (born c. 1982), Sarah Vitorino (born c. 1985), and Louise Masters (born c. 1982). Magnberg came to the UK from Sweden. Their own record label, Crazy Dancer Records, was distributed by Poptones, the label run by Alan McGee, who served as DJ for them and described them as "ABBA meets Phil Spector".

The band was conceived by Adam Howarth, formerly of the surf-rock group Captain Soul, who wanted to put together a contemporary version of The Ronettes. Vitorino and Masters answered an ad in NME, and then Magnberg was brought in from near Gothenburg.

Their first single, in 2005, was "You're the Loser", on the indie label Fierce Panda Records. Their self-titled debut album was released in 2007.

In 2008, they entered the Eurovision - Your Decision finals, hoping to represent the UK at the Eurovision Song Contest with the song "It's You". They reached the second stage where their song was voted on by the public, but failed to make the final sing-off. Earlier in the evening they had been criticised by the judging panel for a weak vocal performance, with particular criticism being levelled at Magnberg who judge Carrie Grant accused of being too weak vocally to lead the song. They represented the UK at the OGAE Second Chance Contest, which is a contest of rejected songs from the national finals organised by fans. Despite gaining four sets of maximum points, they ultimately finished in 16th place. "It's You" was released as a single on 10 November 2008.
