= Russ Spencer =

English singer and TV presenter (born 1980)

- Born: Russell Spencer; 1 March 1980 (age 46); Bournemouth, England
- Genre: Pop
- Occupations: Singer, television presenter
- Years active: 1998 – present
- Labels: EMI, Warner Bros. Records

Russell Spencer (born 1 March 1980) is an English singer and television presenter.

== Scooch ==
Originally formed in 1998, Spencer first gained prominence as a member of pop group Scooch, who signed to EMI and gained four top-twenty hits, including their top-five single "More Than I Needed to Know", as well as the album Four Sure. Worldwide, Scooch scored number one singles in Japan and Australia. Scooch was dropped by EMI and the group disbanded after disappointing sales of Four Sure in 2000.

In 2007, Scooch reformed after seven years, to participate in the famous European television talent contest Eurovision: Making Your Mind Up, a BBC television contest to determine the United Kingdom's entry in the 2007 Eurovision Song Contest in Finland. They were chosen as the UK's entry, beating, amongst others, Justin Hawkins and Brian Harvey. Russ co-wrote the song "Flying the Flag (For You)", signed to Warner Bros. Records and released the song to the UK chart. The UK Eurovision entry automatically goes to the final, where the song received only 19 votes, coming joint 22nd out of 24 entries. However, the single was the highest charting Eurovision song in the UK since 1997 when Katrina and the Waves last won the contest for the country, reaching the number five position.

== Television ==
Spencer has hosted shows such as the ITV game show Make Your Play and presented three nights a week for The Great Big British Quiz on Channel 5. Other presenting credits include MTV, Disney Channel, Quiz Call, Quiz TV and Glitterball for ITV. He has also appeared on Never Mind the Buzzcocks, The Most Annoying Pop Moments... We Hate to Love and Generation X for the BBC. For VH1 he has appeared in Wannabe and Radio Ga Ga. Television acting work includes guest roles in series six of Shameless on Channel 4 and Footballers' Wives on ITV.

Spencer starred in the E4 series Boys Will Be Girls where a new band was formed, but the members had to pass themselves off as being female. Early in 2010, Spencer appeared alongside fellow Scooch band member and partner Caroline Barnes on the Channel 4 series Coach Trip. They were red-carded on day 36, after 19 days on the coach, for having broken the rules by asking others to vote them off.

== Theatre ==
Spencer trained at Laine Theatre Arts, and appeared in the original West End cast of Nine and on the UK tour of Chitty Chitty Bang Bang as The Child Catcher.

He created the role of Ricky St Clair in the UK tour of The Extra Factor, and appeared in Santa Claus – The Musical at the Alexandra Theatre in Birmingham. He has also been in Wayne Sleep's Explosive Dance and Andrew Lloyd Webber's Birthday Celebration, both at the Royal Albert Hall, and a world tour as lead vocalist with the New Zealand Symphony Orchestra and the Hawaii Symphony.

Since 2016 Russ has been associate director of Dirty Dancing - The Classic Story On Stage, while also acting as Company Manager for Dirty Dancing The Classic Story On Stage, Sting's The Last Ship and the 2024 production of Spirited Away at the London Coliseum.

== Radio ==
In 2008, Spencer was a DJ on the independent local radio station 107.8 Radio Jackie.
