= Scooch =

British Eurodance group

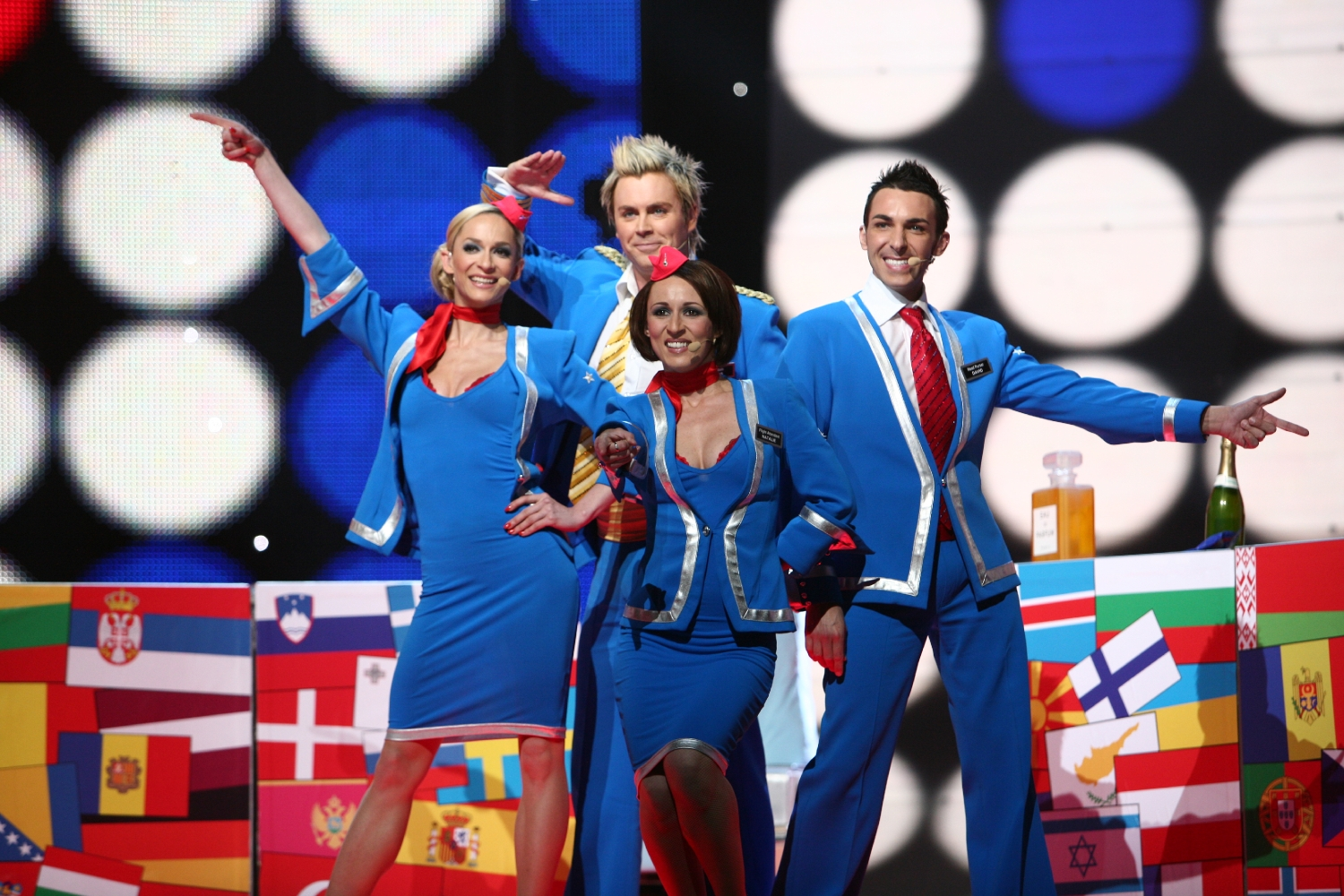
- Scooch performing in the Hartwall Arena in Helsinki, Finland on 12 May 2007 (ESC 2007).

Background information
- Origin: United Kingdom
- Genres: Dance-pop; Eurodance
- Years active: 1998–2001; 2004; 2007–present
- Labels: EMI; Warner Music
- Members: Natalie Powers; Caroline Barnes; David Ducasse; Russ Spencer

Scooch are a British pop group, comprising performers Natalie Powers, Caroline Barnes, David Ducasse and Russ Spencer.

Scooch represented the United Kingdom in the Eurovision Song Contest 2007 in Helsinki with their song "Flying the Flag (For You)", finishing joint 22nd out of 24 entries after receiving 19 points in the final. The song reached number 5 in the UK Top 40 Singles Chart on 13 May 2007 after having been available for download for two months before that.

== Formation ==
Auditions for an "all-singing, all-dancing pop group" were held between autumn 1997 and spring 1998 in front of the songwriters and producers Mike Stock and Matt Aitken and future manager Steve Crosby. Heidi Range auditioned for the group but was declined after it was revealed she was only 14 years old. The final foursome was formed in October 1998. For the first few months the group were kept low-key and spent time on their image and sound. The group's name comes from a term used to ask someone to move up or along a bench or sofa.

== Career ==
Scooch won a contest on BBC One's Saturday morning show Live & Kicking in 1999. They competed against the boy band Glitterbug, to have their single released. Even though the bands were already formed, this contest was unique as it pre-dates the format of the first music talent reality show to air in the United Kingdom, ITV programme Popstars in 2001.

Their debut single "When My Baby" charted within the Top 40. This prompted a tour supporting the Irish girl band B*Witched, and promoted their second and biggest single "More Than I Needed to Know". It entered the UK Singles Chart at number 5 and went on to see a global release (including Japan, where it hit the top of the record chart).

A promotional support tour for boy band Five provided the group with the foundation for their third single "The Best Is Yet to Come" which charted at number 12 in the UK. The group recorded their debut album "Welcome to the Planet Pop" which was released to Top 20 success in Japan. "More Than I Needed to Know" reached number one in Japan, and due to its popularity there, it was featured in the video game DDRMAX2: Dance Dance Revolution 7thMIX. Scooch performed at every arena in the UK and spent a year as Ambassadors for the Children's Health Authority.

Scooch's fourth single came in the form of the flamenco-inspired "For Sure", which made number 15 in the UK. It was followed by the UK version of their album entitled "Four Sure" which peaked just outside the UK Top 40. The band were dropped by their record label and privately split. The group briefly reformed in January 2004 to perform at G-A-Y's Gone But Not Forgotten night, the success of which prompted the band to do a tour of several gay venues and events around the UK.

== Other work ==
In 2006, Russ Spencer took part in the E4 reality show Boys Will Be Girls, in which he attempted, along with two other ex-boyband members, to pose as a girl-group. Spencer and his bandmates were given four weeks to record a single, make a pop video and play live, all the while posing as females. Spencer has also become a television presenter, presenting TV shows including Make Your Play for ITV. His theatre work includes starring as the Child Catcher in the UK National Tour of Chitty Chitty Bang Bang.

Caroline Barnes and Natalie Powers have both had various parts on the stage in the West End. Powers has also released two solo singles, "Music to My Heart" and "Unchained Melody", with Almighty Records.

David Ducasse established his own performing arts academy in the North East in 2000 training young performers. The school celebrated its 15th anniversary with a celebratory concert, which was performed in April 2015. He has also worked extensively as a producer, writer and director, and continues to perform. Recent roles include Dandini alongside Emmerdale actress Roxanne Pallet in Cinderella at the Newcastle Theatre Royal for Qdos Entertainment, Francis Fryer in the UK tour of Calamity Jane for Entertainment Unlimited. This Christmas, Ducasse will play the title role in Dick Whittington at Consett Empire.

Barnes and Spencer took part in Series 4 of Channel 4's Coach Trip and performed in Harry Hill's TV Burp as the finale performance on 12 March 2010 episode with the song "Flying the Flag (For You)" and the end of the performance, Harry (dressed as a German in Oktoberfest clothing) gives them a nul point.

== Eurovision Song Contest 2007 ==
=== Eurovision: Making Your Mind Up ===
On 28 February 2006, it was announced that Scooch were to reform for a Eurovision Song Contest bid.

The group appeared in the UK selection competition Eurovision: Making Your Mind Up on BBC One on Saturday 17 March 2007, singing and performing their song "Flying the Flag (For You)".

The show began with six songs selected by the BBC, which were reduced to two songs after the public had voted, the four songs with the fewest votes leaving the competition. The remaining two songs went head to head in a "sing-off" and the public voted again for the outright winner.

The show ended in controversy as the final result was announced. Fearne Cotton revealed the winner to be Scooch while, simultaneously in a much louder voice, co-host Terry Wogan announced the winner to be fellow entry Cyndi. After several seconds of confusion for the two acts, the crowd and TV viewers, it was revealed that Scooch were the actual winners of the competition and were to represent the United Kingdom in the Eurovision Song Contest 2007. A confused Cyndi was thanked and hurried off the stage by Cotton so Scooch could perform the winning song once again before the programme ended.

It was later revealed that Scooch received 53% of the public vote, with Cyndi receiving 47%.

=== Further controversy ===
Further controversy ensued when the Daily Mirror newspaper reported that the band had used two backing singers offstage as part of their performance on Eurovision: Making Your Mind Up, with the implication that this had given the group an advantage over rival entrants, although this was allowed. This led to false accusations of miming.

Rule 7 of Section 4 of "The Extracts From the Rules for the 2007 Eurovision Song Contest" states that "Artists shall perform live on stage, accompanied by a recorded backing-track which contains no vocals of any kind or any vocal imitations." So as long as the backing singers were live no rules were broken. It is common Eurovision practice to have additional singers offstage. For example, the Swedish entry in 2006 featured backing singers who did not appear onstage until the second half of the song. The rule is that a maximum number of six singers/performers can perform, but there is no rule to say that they must all be shown on stage.

In a video blog, released on Saturday 24 March 2007, singer-turned-TV presenter Charlotte Church claimed that Scooch were not worthy of winning Eurovision: Making Your Mind Up. Church referred to the UK's Eurovision entry, "Flying the Flag (for You)" by Scooch, as "absolute shit" and "embarrassing" for Britain. Church announced that she believed Cyndi should have won the competition instead. Natalie Powers of Scooch hit back saying, "As a mother of a young child myself I find her behaviour and language quite unacceptable. What kind of role model is this for a mum-to-be?" Russ Spencer added, "What a pity the voice of an angel has acquired the mouth of a sewer".

On 28 March 2007, Swedish singer Pandora claimed that the chorus of Scooch's entry for the Eurovision Song Contest, is a "clear cut" case of plagiarism of the chorus in her song "No Regrets" released in 1999. With the help of the Swedish Musicians' Union, she later contacted the EBU in an attempt to have Scooch's entry disqualified from the competition.

In response to the plagiarism claim by Pandora, the BBC issued a statement confirming that Scooch's song is "an original" and the writers "were never aware of Pandora or her songs". The BBC confirmed that there had been no duplication of her work.

On 3 April 2007, the Daily Mirror newspaper apologised to the BBC and EBU for an incorrect story it published stating that the EBU had confirmed that the BBC had breached the EBU's rules during the selection of the UK's Eurovision entry. The flawed story led to rumours of miming by Scooch on the Eurovision: Making Your Mind Up show and led to accusations of competition fixing by the BBC.

=== Promotion campaign ===
On 19 March 2007, Scooch appeared on Richard & Judy on Channel 4, revealing that their dance routine for "Flying the Flag (For You)" in the Eurovision Song Contest 2007 in Helsinki will be "camper than ever before" and "may involve strings". On 22 March, they appeared on This Morning on ITV and in the evening on The Graham Norton Show on BBC One, performing shortened versions of the song.

On 17 April, Scooch shot the music video for their Eurovision entry "Flying the Flag (For You)" in London. The video was released on 23 April 2007 and could be 'exclusively' seen on the BBC Eurovision 2007 website from 24 April 2007. On 18 April, it was announced that Scooch had been signed to the Warner Bros. record label. As part of the contract, Scooch recorded several different language versions of "Flying the Flag (For You)", in which the phrases in the song are spoken in French, German, Spanish, Bulgarian and Danish.

Throughout early May 2007, the group appeared on several British television programmes and radio programmes and took part in numerous media interviews to promote the song and themselves further. A "child-friendly" version of the song was performed on CBBC's Blue Peter with several spoken lines changed to reflect the target audience. Changes included "Would you like a snack sir?" instead of "Some salted nuts Sir?" and "Would you like some sweets Sir?" instead of "Would you like something to suck on for landing sir?". The quartet also performed on the National Lottery Draw on BBC One and on the ITV show Loose Women.

Scooch rehearsed in Helsinki for the Eurovision Song Contest Final from 6 to 11 May and altered several parts of their performance numerous times in the process.

=== Performance in the ESC Final ===
On the final night, Scooch finished joint 22nd out of 24 entries with 19 points; seven points from Ireland and the maximum twelve points from Malta. This was the first time since 2002 that a UK Eurovision entrant had received the maximum twelve points in the competition; Malta later stated that the twelve points was a protest at how many countries in Eurovision voted for their neighbours.

Although "Flying the Flag (for You)" did not attract major European attention, the song reached number 5 in the UK Singles Chart on 13 May 2007, making it the highest charting UK Eurovision entrant since Katrina and the Waves in 1997 and equalling the group's highest-charting song, "More Than I Needed to Know".

== After Eurovision ==
After Eurovision, Scooch announced that although they were staying together as a group, they had no plans to produce new material as they were too busy. However, they said they would be performing live performances and in the future, they will not rule out releasing more songs. They also stated that three of the individual members of Scooch would be performing in theatrical productions. Spencer would be playing The Child Catcher in the UK Tour of Chitty Chitty Bang Bang, Barnes would continue her role in The Producers, and Ducasse would be appearing as the lead-character in Jack and the Beanstalk in Newcastle upon Tyne. Powers, however, planned to take time out to look after her son.

Notably, a songwriter of Scooch's entry Morten Schjolin participated in the national selection again in 2008 with Michelle Gayle's entry on 1 March 2008.

In 2010, Caroline and Russ, who have subsequently started a relationship, were competitors on the fourth series of British reality show Coach Trip. They joined the show on day 18, and were evicted on day 36, making them one of the longest lasting couples of the series.

Since 2007, Scooch have continued to tour the UK and Europe, from 2011 performing their new "Scooch do Glee" show.

Whilst not performing in the band David continues his role as principal of the Performers Stage School in the North East, he also is Presenter on Pride World Radio. Natalie is a principal and vocal coach at Allstars Academy performing arts school in Hemel Hempstead, Caroline works in musical theatre as a performer and choreographer and Russ is a presenter and singer currently starring in the new touring musical The Heat Is On!.

In October 2011 it was announced that Scooch would be performing as a support act to The Mission, who were playing a 25th Anniversary concert at London's Brixton Academy. Scooch were included in the line-up alongside goth legends Fields of the Nephilim and their inclusion caused controversy among both sets of fans.

On 30 April 2024, an advert promoting Easyjet's sponsorship of the 2024 Eurovision contest was released on both the official Eurovision and Easyjet YouTube pages. The ad features Scooch performing the song All Aboard the Orange Plane (The Eurovision Song).

== Discography ==
=== Studio albums ===
Title	Album details	Peak chart positions
Title	Album details	UK
Four Sure (Note: In Japan, Four Sure was released under the title of Welcome to the Planet Pop with a modified tracklist in June 2000.)	Released: August 2000; Label: Accolade Records; Formats: CD, digital download	41

=== Singles ===
Title	Year	Peak chart positions			Album
Title	Year	UK	AUS	NLD	Album
"When My Baby"	1999	29	182	—	Four Sure / Welcome to the Planet Pop
"More Than I Needed to Know"	2000	5	—	62	Four Sure / Welcome to the Planet Pop
"The Best Is Yet to Come"	2000	12	—	—	Four Sure / Welcome to the Planet Pop
"For Sure"	2000	15	181	—	Four Sure / Welcome to the Planet Pop
"One of These Days"	2001	—	—	—	Four Sure / Welcome to the Planet Pop
"Zoom"	2001	—	—	—	Four Sure / Welcome to the Planet Pop
"Flying the Flag (For You)"	2007	5	—	—	Non-album single
"—" denotes a title that did not chart, or was not released in that territory.

== Notes ==
Awards and achievements
Preceded by Daz Sampson with "Teenage Life"	UK in the Eurovision Song Contest; 2007	Succeeded by Andy Abraham with "Even If"
