= Starfinder (game show) =

British children's game show

Starfinder was a British game show that aired on CITV from 2003 to 2004, presented by ex-US naval submarine commander Tom Zikas.

Four children are invited aboard a space station and start training for a week to be an astronaut by carrying out drills involving their practical skills, reactions, and hand–eye coordination. At the end of the week, the winning cadet would get to go to Star City in Russia for some real astronaut training.
