= Even If (Andy Abraham song) =

2008 song by Andy Abraham

Single by Andy Abraham

from the album Even If
- Released: 19 May 2008
- Recorded: 2008
- Genre: Pop; funk
- Label: B-line
- Songwriters: Andy Abraham; Paul Wilson; Andy Watkins

Andy Abraham singles chronology
"December Brings Me Back to You" (2006)	"Even If" (2008)

Music video
- "Even If" on YouTube

Eurovision Song Contest 2008 entry
- Country: United Kingdom
- Artist: Andy Abraham
- Language: English
- Composers: Andy Abraham; Paul Wilson; Andy Watkins
- Lyricists: Andy Abraham; Paul Wilson; Andy Watkins

Finals performance
- Final result: 23rd (joint last)
- Final points: 14

Entry chronology
- ◄ "Flying the Flag (For You)" (2007)
- "It's My Time" (2009) ►

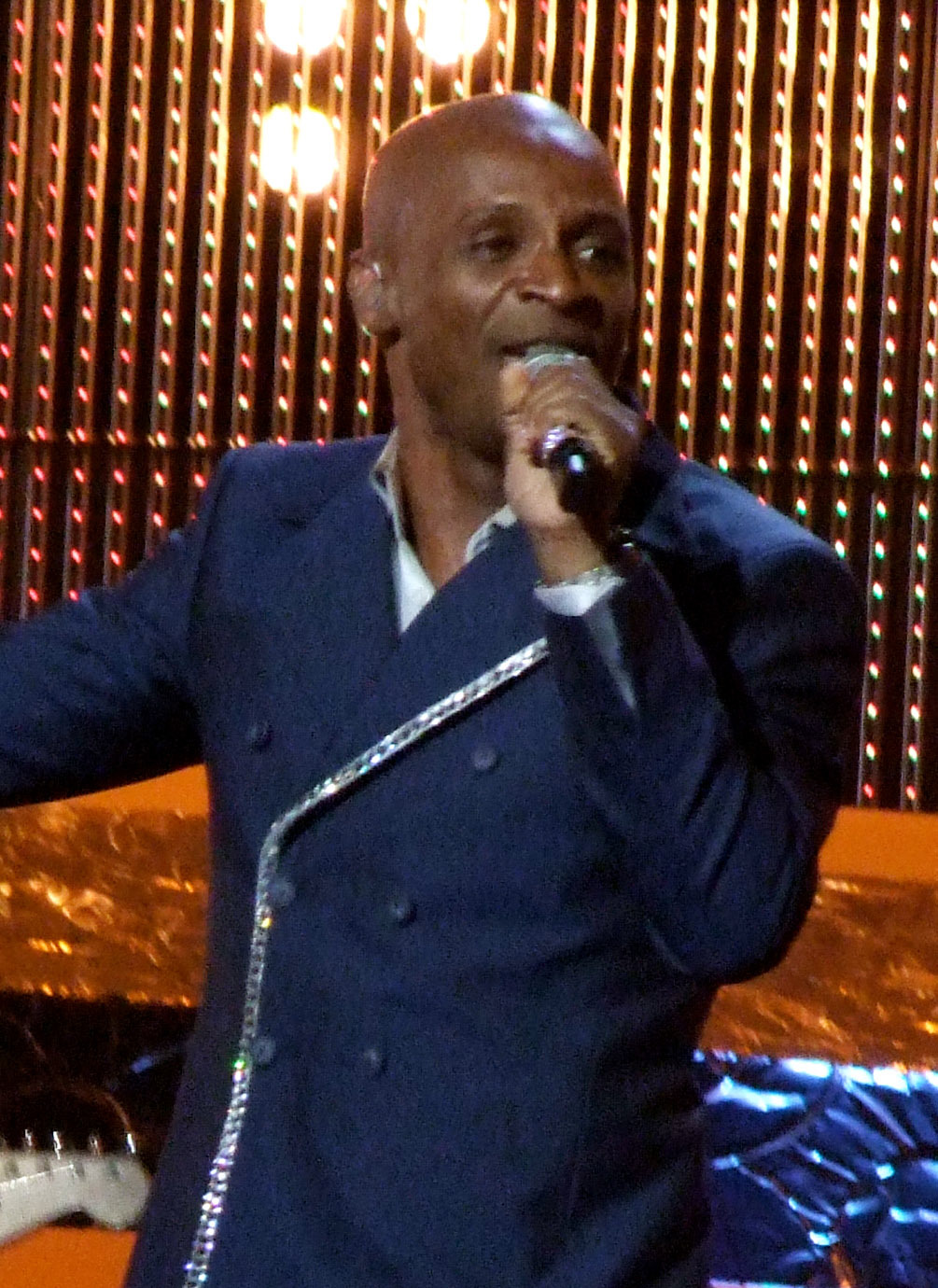
Abraham performing at the Eurovision Song Contest

"Even If" is an up-tempo soul-type song by Andy Abraham, the United Kingdom's entry for the Eurovision Song Contest 2008, which took place in Belgrade, Serbia. It was written by Abraham, Paul Wilson and Andy Watkins, and was released on 19 May 2008. The song finished in joint last place at 23rd, with 14 points.

The single reached #67 on the UK Singles Chart.

The song was succeeded as British representative at the 2009 contest by Jade Ewen with "It's My Time". The UK's 2009 performance was a significant improvement on 2008's last-place finish, with Jade Ewen coming 5th.

== Charts ==
Chart performance for "Even If"
Chart (2008)	Peak position
UK Singles (Official Charts)	67
UK Indie (Official Charts)	3

== Track listing ==
1. "Even If" (radio edit)
2. "Even If" (album version)
3. "Even If" (Manhattan Clique Remix, Radio Edit)
4. "Even If" (karaoke version)
5. "Even If" (music video; bonus)
