= Flying the Flag (For You) =

2007 song by Scooch

Single by Scooch

from the album Eurovision Song Contest 2007
- Released: 30 April 2007
- Genre: Bubblegum pop
- Length: 3:04
- Label: Warner Bros.
- Songwriters: Russ Spencer; Morten Schjolin; Andrew Hill; Paul Tarry

Scooch singles chronology
"For Sure" (2000)	"Flying the Flag (For You)" (2007)

Audio sample
- file; help

Music video
- "Flying the Flag" on YouTube

Eurovision Song Contest 2007 entry
- Country: United Kingdom
- Artists: Russ Spencer; Natalie Powers; Caroline Barnes; David Ducasse
- As: Scooch
- Language: English
- Composers: Russ Spencer; Morten Schjolin; Andrew Hill; Paul Tarry
- Lyricists: Russ Spencer; Morten Schjolin; Andrew Hill; Paul Tarry

Finals performance
- Final result: 22nd (equal)
- Final points: 19

Entry chronology
- ◄ "Teenage Life" (2006)
- "Even If" (2008) ►

"Flying the Flag (For You)" is a song performed by British bubblegum pop dance group Scooch. The official single version was available from 30 April 2007 and was released as a physical CD single in the following week, on 7 May 2007. The song debuted on the UK Singles Chart at No. 5 and peaked at this position. It also charted in Ireland at number 48.

The song was entered in and won the British national selection competition for the Eurovision Song Contest 2007, Eurovision: Making Your Mind Up, and subsequently represented the United Kingdom in the contest, held in Helsinki, Finland. The song came joint 22nd with a total of 19 points, the same score as France.

== Song information ==
Scooch had reformed in hope of performing at the Eurovision Song Contest 2007, and the song was specifically written for the contest; Eurovision rules state that the song must be an original composition and released no more than seven months before the contest. Spencer, as the captain, opens and closes the song with captain's announcements. Powers and Barnes sing the vocals of the song, as Ducasse offers passengers confectioneries. The lyrics are heavily based on actual experiences of flying. The song contains a liberal amount of sexual innuendo, the most overt being "...and blow into the mouthpiece" and "would you like something to suck on for landing, sir?" (the latter was omitted or changed for some tea-time television performances). The camp style was both praised and criticised – The Guardian noted that the song was, in terms of Eurovision, outdated and similar to Bucks Fizz's winning entry in 1981, while Tim Moore called the song "a fine song in Eurovision tradition".

== Music video ==
The original music video was their final performance on Eurovision: Making Your Mind Up; Scooch recorded a new version once their contract with Warner Bros. had been signed. Following the lyrics, the second video starts with the quartet in the front of the aeroplane, with Spencer as the captain. The video continues with all of the members as stewards walking up and down the plane, with a cameo appearance from Sister Mary McArthur, who was invited to take part after the band saw her lip sync video. Later in the video each member of the band is seen dancing in front of the flags of selected countries that are all participating in the Eurovision Song Contest 2007, in addition to the flag of Europe.

== "Flying the Flag" in Helsinki ==
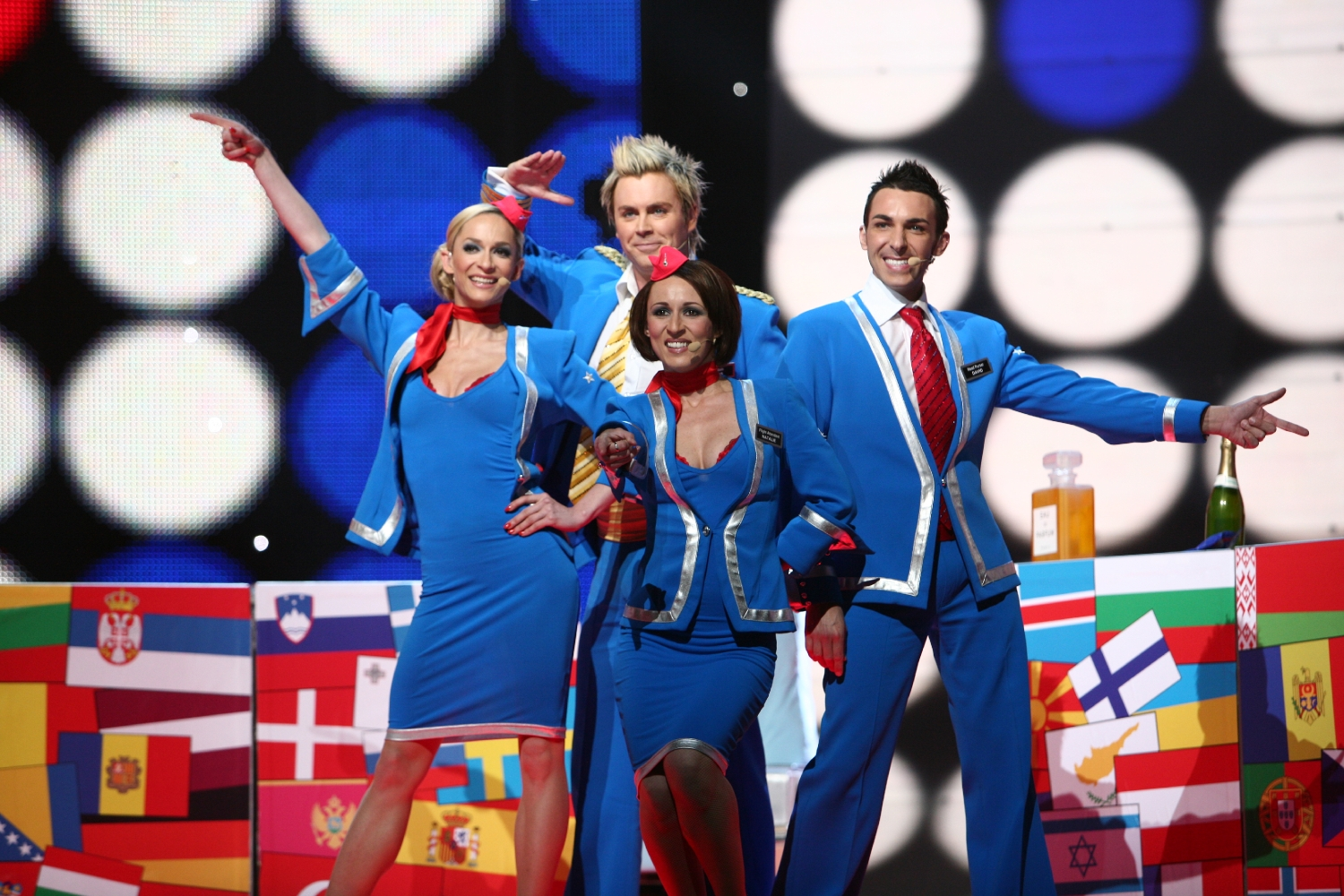
Scooch performing "Flying the Flag (for You)" for the United Kingdom.

"Flying the Flag (For You)" was the nineteenth song to be sung during the Eurovision Song Contest. The song scored only nineteen points: twelve from Malta, and seven from Ireland, two nations known for awarding points to the United Kingdom – although according to the Head of the Maltese Delegation, Malta voted twelve partly in protest to regional block voting which, had made the contest "not about the songs any more", an opinion shared by "five or six other countries". Due to the low score that Scooch had received — only the Irish entry "They Can't Stop the Spring" was lower on the scoreboard — the song received negative press by newspapers, in particular by The Sunday Mirror who stated that the song made the United Kingdom "the laughing stock of Europe", The Sunday Times referred to the song saying "it wasn't a disaster – more of a crash landing".

== International promotion ==
On 18 April 2007 it was announced that Scooch had been signed to the Warner Bros. label. This would help them to promote and release their single to a broader range of fans in the United Kingdom and abroad. As part of the contract, Scooch recorded certain phrases of the song in French, German, Spanish, Bulgarian, and Danish.

== Track listings and formats ==
CD

1. "Flying The Flag (For You)" [Eurovision 2007 Version] (3:04)
2. "Flying The Flag (For You)" [Karaoke Version] (3:04)

DVD

1. "Flying the Flag (For You)" [Video]
2. "How To" Special Scooch Dance Feature [Video]
3. "Flying the Flag (For You)" [Karaoke Version] [Video]
4. "Flying the Flag (For You)" [Audio]

== Charts ==
=== Weekly charts ===
Weekly chart performance for "Flying the Flag (For You)"
Chart (2007)	Peak position
Europe (Eurochart Hot 100)	17
Ireland (IRMA)	48
Scotland Singles (Official Charts)	2
UK Singles (Official Charts)	5

=== Year-end charts ===
Year-end chart performance for "Flying the Flag (For You)"
Chart (2007)	Position
UK Singles (OCC)	185
