= Coach Trip series 16 =

Coach Trip
- Season 16
- No. of days: 40
- Winners: Jack & Joe
- Runners-up: Shaquirah & Winnie

Release
- Original network: E4
- Original release: 24 July – 15 September 2017

Additional information
- Filming dates: 14 May – 12 June 2017

Series chronology
- ← Previous; Series 15 Next → Series 17

Coach Trip 16, also known as Coach Trip: Road to Zante is the sixteenth series of Coach Trip in the United Kingdom. The series was confirmed by E4 on 14 December 2016. Filming took place between 14 May 2017 and 12 June 2017. The series consists of 40 episodes, an increase of previous series, and follow the "Road to..." format. The series began airing on E4 on 24 July 2017 for 40 episodes and concluded on 15 September 2017.

== Contestants ==
Couple were aboard the coach	Couple got yellow carded	Couple won a prize at the vote
Couple were immune from votes	Couple got red carded	Couple refused to vote
Couple left the coach	Couple were not present at the vote

Couple	Relationship	Trip duration (days)																																							
Couple	Relationship	1	2	3	4	5	6	7	8	9	10	11	12	13	14	15	16	17	18	19	20	21	22	23	24	25	26	27	28	29	30	31	32	33	34	35	36	37	38	39	40
Joely & Liam (original 7)	Partners		Yellow card	Red card	Eliminated 1st on 26 July 2017																																				
Charlotte & Mark (original 7)	Friends	Yellow card			Red card	Eliminated 2nd on 27 July 2017																																			
Paul & Stuart (replaced Charlotte & Mark)	Solo travellers	Not on Coach								Yellow card		Red card	Eliminated 3rd on 7 August 2017																												
Mark & Mitch (original 7)	Friends												Yellow card	Walked 1st on 8 August 2017																											
Chantal & Hollye (original 7)	Solo travellers								Yellow card					Walked 2nd on 8 August 2017																											
Grant & Tash (original 7)	Friends					Yellow card								Red card	Eliminated 4th on 9 August 2017																										
Jae & Zhana (original 7)	Sisters							Yellow card								Red card	Eliminated 5th on 11 August 2017																								
Ash & Latham (original 7)	Friends						Yellow card											Red card	Eliminated 6th on 15 August 2017																						
Choon & Jamie (replaced Paul & Stuart)	Friends	Not on Coach																	Yellow card		Walked 3rd on 17 August 2017																				
Abbie & Dunstan (replaced Mark & Mitch)	Partners	Not on Coach															Yellow card			Red card	Eliminated 7th on 17 August 2017																				
Sarah & Shelley (replaced Joely & Liam)	Friends	Not on Coach									Yellow card										Red card	Eliminated 8th on 18 August 2017																			
Ben & Louise (replaced Ash & Latham)	Friends	Not on Coach																				Yellow card	Red card	Eliminated 9th on 22 August 2017																	
Bella & Molly (replaced Jae & Zhana)	Solo travellers	Not on Coach																						Yellow card	Red card	Eliminated 10th on 24 August 2017															
James & Rick (replaced Sarah & Shelley)	Friends	Not on Coach																								Yellow card	Red card	Eliminated 11th on 28 August 2017													
Chantal & Jacob (Chantal is an original 7) (Jacob replaced Hollye)	Solo travellers	Not on Coach																								Yellow card		Red card	Eliminated 12th on 29 August 2017												
Callum & Ryan (replaced Grant & Tash)	Friends	Not on Coach																											Red card	Removed 1st on 30 August 2017											
Lucia & Taylor (replaced Bella & Molly)	Friends	Not on Coach																												Yellow card	Red card	Eliminated 13th on 1 September 2017									
Larissa & Paige (replaced Ben & Louise)	Friends	Not on Coach																														Yellow card				Red card	Eliminated 14th on 8 September 2017				
Jess & Nic (replaced Callum & Ryan)	Friends	Not on Coach																																	Yellow card		Red card	Eliminated 15th on 11 September 2017			
Pav & Tre (replaced Chantal & Jacob)	Solo travellers	Not on Coach																															Yellow card					Red card	Eliminated 16th on 12 September 2017		
Danny & Fiona (replaced James & Rick)	Partners	Not on Coach																																Yellow card						Red card	Eliminated 17th on 14 September 2017
Allysha & Beth (replaced Jess & Nic)	Friends	Not on Coach																																							Third on 15 September 2017
Lizzie & Owen (replaced Larissa & Paige)	Friends	Not on Coach																																							Third on 15 September 2017
Phil & Sam (replaced Lucia & Taylor)	Friends	Not on Coach																																					Yellow card		Third on 15 September 2017
Shaquirah & Winnie (replaced Abbie & Dunstan)	Friends	Not on Coach																											Yellow card												Second on 15 September 2017
Jack & Joe (replaced Choon & Jamie)	Friends	Not on Coach																																							Winners on 15 September 2017

== Voting history ==
Couple won the series	Couple were yellow carded	Couple were not present at the vote
Couple were runners up	Couple were red carded	Couple won a prize at the vote
Couple were third	Couple were immune from votes	Couple refused to vote
Couple were fourth	Couple left the coach

	Day																																								
	1	2	3	4	5	6	7	8	9	10	11	12	13	14	15	16	17	18	19	20	21	22	23	24	25	26	27	28	29	30	31	32	33	34	35	36	37	38	39	40	
Jack Joe	Not on Coach																				Ben; Louise	Ben; Louise	Bella; Molly	Bella; Molly	James; Rick	James; Rick	Chantal; Jacob	Shaquirah; Winnie	Shaquirah; Winnie	Shaquirah; Winnie	Shaquirah; Winnie	Pav; Tre	Pav; Tre	Jess; Nic	Pav; Tre	Pav; Tre	Pav; Tre	Phil; Sam	Danny; Fiona	Shaquirah; Winnie	First (3 votes)
Jack Joe	Not on Coach																				Ben; Louise	Ben; Louise	Bella; Molly	Bella; Molly	Chantal; Jacob	James; Rick	Chantal; Jacob	Shaquirah; Winnie	Shaquirah; Winnie	Shaquirah; Winnie	Shaquirah; Winnie	Pav; Tre	Pav; Tre	Jess; Nic	Pav; Tre	Pav; Tre	Pav; Tre	Phil; Sam	Danny; Fiona	Shaquirah; Winnie	First (3 votes)
Shaquirah Winnie	Not on Coach																					Callum; Ryan	Callum; Ryan	Bella; Molly	James; Rick	James; Rick	Chantal; Jacob	Larissa; Paige	Lucia; Taylor	Jack; Joe	Larissa; Paige	Larissa; Paige	Jess; Nic	Jess; Nic	Phil; Sam	Jess; Nic	Pav; Tre	Phil; Sam	Danny; Fiona	Jack; Joe	Second (2 votes)
Shaquirah Winnie	Not on Coach																					Callum; Ryan	Callum; Ryan	Bella; Molly	Callum; Ryan	James; Rick	Chantal; Jacob	Larissa; Paige	Lucia; Taylor	Jack; Joe	Larissa; Paige	Larissa; Paige	Jess; Nic	Jess; Nic	Phil; Sam	Jess; Nic	Pav; Tre	Phil; Sam	Danny; Fiona	Jack; Joe	Second (2 votes)
Phil Sam	Not on Coach																																Danny; Fiona	Shaquirah; Winnie	Pav; Tre	Jess; Nic	Pav; Tre	Danny; Fiona	Danny; Fiona	Jack; Joe	Third (0 votes)
Lizzie Owen	Not on Coach																																				Pav; Tre	Phil; Sam	Phil; Sam	Shaquirah; Winnie	Third (0 votes)
Allysha Beth	Not on Coach																																				Pav; Tre	Phil; Sam	Phil; Sam	Jack; Joe	Third (0 votes)
Danny Fiona	Not on Coach																											Shaquirah; Winnie	Lucia; Taylor	Lucia; Taylor	Larissa; Paige	Pav; Tre	Jess; Nic	Larissa; Paige	Larissa; Paige	Pav; Tre	Pav; Tre	Phil; Sam	Phil; Sam	Red Carded (Day 39)	
Pav Tre	Not on Coach																													Jack; Joe	Larissa; Paige	Larissa; Paige	Jack; Joe	Jack; Joe	Larissa; Paige	Phil; Sam	Danny; Fiona	Red Carded (Day 37)			
Jess Nic	Not on Coach																														Shaquirah; Winnie	Larissa; Paige	Danny; Fiona	Danny; Fiona	Shaquirah; Winnie	Phil; Sam	Red Carded (Day 36)				
Larissa Paige	Not on Coach																									James; Rick	Chantal; Jacob	Shaquirah; Winnie	Lucia; Taylor	Lucia; Taylor	Shaquirah; Winnie	Pav; Tre	Shaquirah; Winnie	Danny; Fiona	Danny; Fiona	Red Carded (Day 35)					
Lucia Taylor	Not on Coach																										Callum; Ryan	Shaquirah; Winnie	Larissa; Paige	Danny; Fiona	Red Carded (Day 30)										
Callum Ryan	Not on Coach														Ash; Latham	Choon; Jamie	Ash; Latham	Choon; Jamie	Abbie; Dunstan	Sarah; Shelley	Ben; Louise	Ben; Louise	Bella; Molly	Bella; Molly	James; Rick	James; Rick	Shaquirah; Winnie	Refused	Removed (Day 28)												
Callum Ryan	Not on Coach														Ash; Latham	Choon; Jamie	Ash; Latham	Choon; Jamie	Abbie; Dunstan	Sarah; Shelley	Ben; Louise	Ben; Louise	Bella; Molly	Bella; Molly	Shaquirah; Winnie	James; Rick	Shaquirah; Winnie	Refused	Removed (Day 28)												
Chantal Jacob	Not on Coach												Grant; Tash	None	Jae; Zhana	Abbie; Dunstan	Ash; Latham	Choon; Jamie	Abbie; Dunstan	Callum; Ryan	Ben; Louise	Ben; Louise	Bella; Molly	Bella; Molly	James; Rick	James; Rick	Shaquirah; Winnie	Red Carded (Day 27)													
Chantal Jacob	Not on Coach												Grant; Tash	None	Jae; Zhana	Abbie; Dunstan	Ash; Latham	Choon; Jamie	Abbie; Dunstan	Callum; Ryan	Ben; Louise	Ben; Louise	Bella; Molly	Bella; Molly	Shaquirah; Winnie	James; Rick	Shaquirah; Winnie	Red Carded (Day 27)													
James Rick	Not on Coach																						Callum; Ryan	Chantal; Jacob	Callum; Ryan	Callum; Ryan	Red Carded (Day 26)														
James Rick	Not on Coach																						Callum; Ryan	Chantal; Jacob	Chantal; Jacob	Callum; Ryan	Red Carded (Day 26)														
Bella Molly	Not on Coach																		Sarah; Shelley	Sarah; Shelley	Callum; Ryan	Ben; Louise	Callum; Ryan	Jack; Joe	Red Carded (Day 24)																
Ben Louise	Not on Coach																		Sarah; Shelley	Chantal; Jacob	Chantal; Jacob	Callum; Ryan	Red Carded (Day 22)																		
Sarah Shelley	Not on Coach				Ash; Latham	Ash; Latham	Jae; Zhana	Ash; Latham	Jae; Zhana	Ash; Latham	Ash; Latham	Jae; Zhana	Grant; Tash	None	Choon; Jamie	Abbie; Dunstan	Ash; Latham	Abbie; Dunstan	Abbie; Dunstan	Callum; Ryan	Red Carded (Day 20)																				
Abbie Dunstan	Not on Coach													None	Jae; Zhana	Sarah; Shelley	Ash; Latham	Chantal; Jacob	Sarah; Shelley	Red Carded (Day 19)																					
Choon Jamie	Not on Coach												Sarah; Shelley	None	Jae; Zhana	Ash; Latham	Ash; Latham	Callum; Ryan	Left	Walked (Day 19)																					
Ash Latham	Charlotte; Mark	Charlotte; Mark	Charlotte; Mark	Charlotte; Mark	Grant; Tash	Grant; Tash	Sarah; Shelley	Sarah; Shelley	Sarah; Shelley	Sarah; Shelley	Paul; Stuart	Grant; Tash	Grant; Tash	None	Choon; Jamie	Abbie; Dunstan	Callum; Ryan	Red Carded (Day 17)																							
Jae Zhana	Charlotte; Mark	Joely; Liam	Joely; Liam	Charlotte; Mark	Grant; Tash	Grant; Tash	Sarah; Shelley	Sarah; Shelley	Paul; Stuart	Sarah; Shelley	Paul; Stuart	Sarah; Shelley	Sarah; Shelley	None	Sarah; Shelley	Red Carded (Day 15)																									
Grant Tash	Charlotte; Mark	Chantal; Hollye	Ash; Latham	Jae; Zhana	Chantal; Hollye	Ash; Latham	Jae; Zhana	Ash; Latham	Paul; Stuart	Paul; Stuart	Ash; Latham	Ash; Latham	Ash; Latham	Red Carded (Day 13)																											
Chantal Hollye	Grant; Tash	Joely; Liam	Joely; Liam	Charlotte; Mark	Grant; Tash	Ash; Latham	Mark; Mitch	Mark; Mitch	Mark; Mitch	Mark; Mitch	Mark; Mitch	Mark; Mitch	Walked (Day 12)																												
Mark Mitch	N/A	Joely; Liam	Charlotte; Mark	Charlotte; Mark	Grant; Tash	Chantal; Hollye	Chantal; Hollye	Chantal; Hollye	Chantal; Hollye	Chantal; Hollye	Chantal; Hollye	Chantal; Hollye	Walked (Day 12)																												
Paul Stuart	Not on Coach						Jae; Zhana	Chantal; Hollye	Jae; Zhana	Jae; Zhana	Grant; Tash	Red Carded (Day 11)																													
Charlotte Mark	Ash; Latham	Mark; Mitch	Ash; Latham	Ash; Latham	Red Carded (Day 4)																																				
Joely Liam	Jae; Zhana	Mark; Mitch	Chantal; Hollye	Red Carded (Day 3)																																					
Notes	^{1}	None			^{2}	None	^{3}	None				^{4} ^{5} ^{6}	^{7}	^{8}	None				^{9}	None					^{10}	None		^{11}	None					^{12}		None					
Walked	None											Mark; Mitch	None						Choon; Jamie	None																					
Walked	None											Hollye	None						Choon; Jamie	None																					
Removed	None																											Callum; Ryan	None												
Voted Off	Charlotte; Mark; 3 votes	Joely; Liam; 3 votes	Joely; Liam; 2 votes	Charlotte; Mark; 4 votes	Grant; Tash; 4 votes	Ash; Latham; 3 votes	Jae; Zhana; 3 votes	Chantal; Hollye; 2 votes	Paul; Stuart; 2 votes	Sarah; Shelley; 2 votes	Paul; Stuart; 2 votes	Mark; Mitch; 1 vote	Grant; Tash; 3 votes	None	Jae; Zhana; 3 votes	Abbie; Dunstan; 3 votes	Ash; Latham; 5 votes	Choon; Jamie; 2 votes	Abbie; Dunstan; 3 votes	Sarah; Shelley; 2 votes	Ben; Louise; 3 votes	Ben; Louise; 4 votes	Bella; Molly; 3 votes	Bella; Molly; 4 votes	James; Rick; 4 votes	James; Rick; 5 votes	Chantal; Jacob; 3 votes	Shaquirah; Winnie; 4 votes	Lucia; Taylor; 3 votes	Lucia; Taylor; 2 votes	Larissa; Paige; 3 votes	Pav; Tre; 3 votes	Danny; Fiona; 2 votes	Jess; Nic; 2 votes	Larissa; Paige; 2 votes	Jess; Nic; 2 votes	Pav; Tre; 6 votes	Phil; Sam; 5 votes	Danny; Fiona; 3 votes	None	
Voted Off	Charlotte; Mark; 3 votes	Joely; Liam; 3 votes	Joely; Liam; 2 votes	Charlotte; Mark; 4 votes	Grant; Tash; 4 votes	Ash; Latham; 3 votes	Jae; Zhana; 3 votes	Chantal; Hollye; 2 votes	Paul; Stuart; 2 votes	Sarah; Shelley; 2 votes	Paul; Stuart; 2 votes	Mark; Mitch; 1 vote	Grant; Tash; 3 votes	None	Jae; Zhana; 3 votes	Abbie; Dunstan; 3 votes	Ash; Latham; 5 votes	Choon; Jamie; 2 votes	Abbie; Dunstan; 3 votes	Sarah; Shelley; 2 votes	Ben; Louise; 3 votes	Ben; Louise; 4 votes	Bella; Molly; 3 votes	Bella; Molly; 4 votes	Chantal; Jacob; 2 votes	James; Rick; 5 votes	Chantal; Jacob; 3 votes	Shaquirah; Winnie; 4 votes	Lucia; Taylor; 3 votes	Lucia; Taylor; 2 votes	Larissa; Paige; 3 votes	Pav; Tre; 3 votes	Danny; Fiona; 2 votes	Jess; Nic; 2 votes	Larissa; Paige; 2 votes	Jess; Nic; 2 votes	Pav; Tre; 6 votes	Phil; Sam; 5 votes	Danny; Fiona; 3 votes	None	

=== Notes ===
^1 On Day 1, Mark & Mitch were not present at the vote as they were in hospital due to Mitch being injured in the morning activity.

^2 On Day 5, a couple was randomly selected and the couple that they voted for would receive a yellow card. The couple chosen was Mark & Mitch, meaning that Grant & Tash received a yellow card.

^3 On Day 7, Hollye was not present at the evening's vote after injuring her foot during the morning activity, resulting in her going to hospital. Her partner, Chantal, still delivered their vote.

^4 On Day 12, the vote resulted in no couple receiving a majority as all couples received one vote. The group had to discuss which couple would receive a yellow card. If the group did not reach an agreement, each couple would receive a yellow card, meaning five of the six couples on the coach would be eliminated. The yellow card was awarded to Mark & Mitch.

^5 Shortly after the vote on Day 12, Mark & Mitch announced that they had to return home and walked from the coach.

^6 Following Mark & Mitch's departure, Hollye announced that she had to return home and walked from the coach. Chantal decided to remain on the coach as she began the trip as a solo traveller.

^7 On Day 13, Chantal took part in the vote as an individual as she awaited the arrival of her new partner. She continued to have a yellow card after Chantal & Hollye were voted on Day 8.

^8 On Day 14, the new couples, Choon & Jamie and Abbie & Dunstan, were given the opportunity to remove one couple's yellow card at the vote. Each couple was given the chance to say why they wanted their yellow card removed.

^9 As the couples boarded the coach on Day 19, Brendan announced that Choon & Jamie had decided to walk from the coach. Therefore, they were not present at the evening's vote.

^10 On Day 25, each couple voted for the two couples that they wanted to receive a yellow card. The two couples with the most votes received a yellow card.

^11 On Day 28, Callum & Ryan refused to vote. As voting is mandatory, Brendan had to automatically present the couple with a red card. Larissa & Paige had already voted for Callum & Ryan before their refusal to vote, which therefore became void. Alternatively, each couple was given a chance to discuss the couple that they wanted to vote for following Callum & Ryan's removal.

^12 On Day 34, Brendan announced that the next couple to receive a red card would choose a couple to have immunity until the final day. On Day 35, Larissa & Paige received a red card and chose Jack & Joe to receive immunity.

== The trip by day ==
Day	Location	Activity	
Day	Location	Morning	Afternoon
1	Nice	Blobbing	Photo shoot
2	Monaco	Rock climbing	Helicopter ride
3	Sanremo	Snorkeling	Life drawing
4	Savona	Prehistoric games	Treasure hunt
5	Genoa	Pesto making	Donkey sanctuary
6	Genoa	Thai massage	Penalty shootout
7	La Spezia	Kayaking	Henna tattooing
8	Parma	Car racing	Bubble football
9	Bologna	Cookery class	Aerial acrobatics class
10	Rimini	Castle water fight	Beach tennis
11	Ancona	Wakeboarding	Volleyball
12	Split	Traditional dancing	Sea bobbing
13	Hvar	Human table football	Craft beer brewery
14	Hvar	Paddleboard yoga class	Banana boat ride
15	Split	Waterfall visit	Quad biking
16	Split	Picigin	Cliff jumping
17	Omiš	Pirate roleplay	Klapa singing
18	Makarska	Parasailing	Zip wire
19	Brač	Barbecue	Jet skiing
20	Brač	Stone carving class	Inflatable assault course
21	Zaostrog	Language class	Olympic beach games
22	Neretva Valley	Ladja boat race	Village games
23	Ston	Oyster tasting	Salt flats visit
24	Dubrovnik	Abseiling	Semi-submarine trip
25	Dubrovnik	Sea kayaking	Water polo
26	Bari	Pole dancing	Golf
27	Ostuni	Pottery class	Birds of prey display
28	Taranto	Goat milking	Pizza making
29	Guagnano	Paddleboarding	Wine tasting
30	Gallipoli	Water park	Hammam spa
31	Lecce	Quidditch	Go-kart racing
32	Monopoli	Water sports	Pedalo ride
33	Bari	Octopus curling	Graffiti art
34	Patras	Deck games	Fitness class
35	Patras	Contact improvisation	Chicken catching
36	Olympia	Laughter yoga	Beekeeping
37	Kyllini	Windsurfing	Mud bath
38	Zakynthos	Beach rounders	Greek dancing
39	Zakynthos	Mini-golf	Body painting
40	Zakynthos	Flyboarding	Pool Party
