= Coach Trip series 11 =

Coach Trip
- Series 11
- No. of days: 20
- Winner: Grace & Corene
- Runner-up: Jack & Adam

Release
- Original network: Channel 4
- Original release: 24 November – 19 December 2014

Additional information
- Filming dates: August 2014 – September 2014

Series chronology
- ← Previous; Series 10 Next → Series 12

Coach Trip is a British reality television game show that involves ordinary couples, with a pre-existing relationship, board a coach and travel to destinations around Europe on a 20-day tour. Those who board the coach have to try to avoid votes from the other couples on board, voting takes place at the end of each day of the trip. Series 11 began on 24 November 2014, airing weekdays at 17:30 on Channel 4. Brendan Sheerin returned as tour guide, as in all previous editions.

This was the second block of 20 episodes out of the 80 commissioned in 2014.

== Contestants ==
Couple were aboard the coach	Couple got yellow carded
Couple were immune from votes	Couple got red carded
Couple left the coach

Couple	Relationship	Trip Duration (Days)																			
Couple	Relationship	1	2	3	4	5	6	7	8	9	10	11	12	13	14	15	16	17	18	19	20
Jane & Nick (original 7)	Friends		Yellow card	Red card	Eliminated 1st on 26 November 2014																
Dave & Phil (original 7)	Friends	Yellow card			Red card	Eliminated 2nd on 27 November 2014															
Louise & Wendy (replaced Dave & Phil)	Mother & Daughter	Not on coach						Yellow card	Walked 1st on 2 December 2014												
Alex & Maz (replaced Jane & Nick)	Friends	Not on coach					Yellow card			Red card	Eliminated 3rd on 4 December 2014										
Sabina & Sil (Replaced Louise & Wendy)	Brother & Sister	Not on coach									Yellow card		Red card	Eliminated 4th on 9 December 2014							
Becca & Neil (original 7)	Partners					Yellow card								Red card	Eliminated 5th on 10 December 2014						
Elena & Jodie (original 7)	Friends								Yellow card						Red card	Eliminated 6th on 11 December 2014					
Betty & Mo (replaced Becca & Neil)	Husband & Wife	Not on coach																Yellow card		Red card	Eliminated 7th on 18 December 2014
Dotty & Sam (original 7)	Friends											Yellow card								Red card	Eliminated 8th on 18 December 2014
Dan & Kelly (Replaced Elena & Jodie)	Partners	Not on coach																	Yellow card		Third on 19 December 2014
Darren & Tommy (Replaced Alex & Maz)	Father & Son	Not on coach														Yellow card					Third on 19 December 2014
Dylan & Holly (Replaced Sabina & Sil)	Friends	Not on coach															Yellow card				Third on 19 December 2014
Adam & Jack (original 7)	Friends										Yellow card										Second on 19 December 2014
Corene & Grace (original 7)	Mother & Daughter														Yellow card						Winners on 19 December 2014
