= Coach Trip series 14 =

Coach Trip
- Series 14
- No. of days: 30
- Winner: Holmest & Lauryn
- Runner-up: Alex & Rochelle

Release
- Original network: E4
- Original release: 25 July – 2 September 2016

Additional information
- Filming dates: May 2015 – July 2015

Series chronology
- ← Previous; Series 13 Next → Series 15

Coach Trip 14, also known as Coach Trip: Road to Ibiza, is the fourteenth series of Coach Trip in the United Kingdom, the series was moved to E4 compared to previously broadcast on Channel 4. The filming took place between May and July 2015, the series began airing 25 July 2016 for 30 episodes, concluding on 2 September 2016. The first set of seven couples were revealed on 19 July 2016.

On 23 August 2016, Channel 4 confirmed that a fifteenth series of Coach Trip had been commissioned with filming starting in October 2016.

== Voting system ==
The Voting system on this series was:

Days 1 to 26 was a yellow card
Days 27 to 29 an automatic red card due to all couples canvassing for future votes before the vote on day 24

Similar system to Celebrity Coach Trip.

== Contestants ==
Couple were aboard the coach	Couple got yellow carded	Couple refused to vote
Couple were immune from votes	Couple got red carded	Couple were not present at the vote
Couple left the coach	Couple banned from voting	Couple won a prize at the vote

Couple	Relationship	Trip Duration (Days)																													
Couple	Relationship	1	2	3	4	5	6	7	8	9	10	11	12	13	14	15	16	17	18	19	20	21	22	23	24	25	26	27	28	29	30
Holmest & Lauryn (replaced Gina & Lisa)	Friends	Not on coach																		Yellow card											Winners on 2 September 2016
Alex & Rochelle (replaced Ellie & Tash)	Friends	Not on coach											Yellow card																		Second on 2 September 2016
Andy & Dan (replaced Hannah & Mike)	Solo travellers	Not on coach																	Yellow card												Third on 2 September 2016
Alex & James (replaced Daniel & Hannah)	Brothers	Not on coach																													Fourth on 2 September 2016
Charlotte & Laura (replaced Ellie & Kat)	Friends	Not on coach																													Fourth on 2 September 2016
Ashley & Georgia (replaced Gareth & Mason)	Friends	Not on coach																												Red card	Eliminated 11th on 1 September 2016
Aaron & Nick (replaced Alex & Ed)	Friends	Not on coach																									Yellow card		Red card	Eliminated 10th on 31 August 2016	
Ellie & Kat (replaced Holly & Lauren)	Friends	Not on coach																										Red card	Eliminated 9th on 30 August 2016		
Gareth & Mason (replaced Josh & Liam)	Twins	Not on coach																							Yellow card	Red card	Eliminated 8th on 26 August 2016				
Daniel & Hannah (replaced Ashleigh & Debbie)	Twins	Not on coach																					Yellow card	Red card	Eliminated 7th on 24 August 2016						
Holly & Lauren (replaced Abi & Jess)	Friends	Not on coach																				Yellow card	Red card	Eliminated 6th on 23 August 2016							
Alex & Ed (replaced Danny & Faye)	Study buddies	Not on coach															Yellow card				Red card	Eliminated 5th on 19 August 2016									
Josh & Liam (replaced Emma & Hannah)	Friends	Not on coach																				Walked 4th on 19 August 2016									
Ashleigh & Debbie (replaced Liam & Sam)	Friends	Not on coach																		Walked 3rd on 17 August 2016											
Abi & Jess (replaced Enzo & Michelina)	Partners	Not on coach											Yellow card					Red card	Eliminated 4th on 16 August 2016												
Hannah & Mike (replaced Jake & Jordan)	Friends	Not on coach												Yellow card	Red card	Eliminated 3rd on 11 August 2016															
Gina & Lisa (replaced Dylan & Matt)	Friends	Not on coach									Yellow card	Red card	Eliminated 2nd on 8 August 2016																		
Liam & Sam (original 7)	Solo travellers		Yellow card						Red card	Removed 5th on 3 August 2016																					
Jake & Jordan (original 7)	Friends				Yellow card				Red card	Removed 4th on 3 August 2016																					
Emma & Hannah (original 7)	Friends							Yellow card	Red card	Removed 3rd on 3 August 2016																					
Dylan & Matt (original 7)	Partners						Yellow card		Red card	Removed 2nd on 3 August 2016																					
Danny & Faye (original 7)	Partners								Red card	Removed 1st on 3 August 2016																					
Enzo & Michelina (replaced Amber & George)	Brother & sister	Not on coach								Walked 2nd on 3 August 2016																					
Ellie & Tash (original 7)	Workmates					Yellow card		Walked 1st on 1 August 2016																							
Amber & George (original 7)	Friends	Yellow card		Red card	Eliminated 1st on 27 July 2016																										

== Voting history ==
Couple won the series	Couple were yellow carded	Couple banned from voting
Couple were runners up	Couple were red carded	Couple were not present at the vote
Couple were third	Couple were immune from votes	Vote was cancelled
Couple were fourth	Couple refused to vote	Couple won a prize at the vote
Couple left the coach

	Day																														
	1	2	3	4	5	6	7	8	9	10	11	12	13	14	15	16	17	18	19	20	21	22	23	24	25	26	27	28	29	30	
Holmest Lauryn	Not on Coach													Hannah; Mike	Josh; Liam	Alex; Ed	Ashleigh; Debbie	Alex; Ed	Andy; Dan	Alex; Ed	Daniel; Hannah	Holly; Lauren	Daniel; Hannah	Gareth; Mason	Gareth; Mason	Aaron; Nick	Ellie; Kat	Aaron; Nick	Ashley; Georgia	Alex; Rochelle	Winners (2 votes)
Holmest Lauryn	Not on Coach													Hannah; Mike	Josh; Liam	Alex; Ed	Ashleigh; Debbie	Alex; Ed	Andy; Dan	Alex; Ed	Daniel; Hannah	Gareth; Mason	Daniel; Hannah	Gareth; Mason	Gareth; Mason	Aaron; Nick	Ellie; Kat	Aaron; Nick	Ashley; Georgia	Alex; Rochelle	Winners (2 votes)
Alex Rochelle	Not on Coach							Liam; Sam	Cancelled	Gina; Lisa	Gina; Lisa	Abi; Jess	Hannah; Mike	Hannah; Mike	Josh; Liam	Alex; Ed	Abi; Jess	Andy; Dan	Andy; Dan	Alex; Ed	Holly; Lauren	Holly; Lauren	Daniel; Hannah	Gareth; Mason	Andy; Dan	Aaron; Nick	Andy; Dan	Ashley; Georgia	Ashley; Georgia	Holmest; Lauryn	Second (2 votes)
Alex Rochelle	Not on Coach							Liam; Sam	Cancelled	Gina; Lisa	Gina; Lisa	Abi; Jess	Hannah; Mike	Hannah; Mike	Josh; Liam	Alex; Ed	Abi; Jess	Andy; Dan	Andy; Dan	Alex; Ed	Holly; Lauren	Gareth; Mason	Daniel; Hannah	Gareth; Mason	Andy; Dan	Aaron; Nick	Andy; Dan	Ashley; Georgia	Ashley; Georgia	Holmest; Lauryn	Second (2 votes)
Andy Dan	Not on Coach															Alex; Ed	Alex; Ed	Holmest; Lauryn	Holmest; Lauryn	Holmest; Lauryn	Holly; Lauren	Holly; Lauren	Daniel; Hannah	Gareth; Mason	Gareth; Mason	Aaron; Nick	Ellie; Kat	Aaron; Nick	Ashley; Georgia	Holmest; Lauryn	Third (1 vote)
Andy Dan	Not on Coach															Alex; Ed	Alex; Ed	Holmest; Lauryn	Holmest; Lauryn	Holmest; Lauryn	Holly; Lauren	Daniel; Hannah	Daniel; Hannah	Gareth; Mason	Gareth; Mason	Aaron; Nick	Ellie; Kat	Aaron; Nick	Ashley; Georgia	Holmest; Lauryn	Third (1 vote)
Alex James	Not on coach																								Gareth; Mason	Aaron; Nick	Ellie; Kat	Aaron; Nick	Ashley; Georgia	Alex; Rochelle	Fourth (0 votes)
Charlotte Laura	Not on coach																											Alex; Rochelle	Alex; James	Andy; Dan	Fourth (0 votes)
Ashley Georgia	Not on coach																									Alex; Rochelle	Alex; Rochelle	Alex; James	Alex; Rochelle	Red Carded (Day 29)	
Aaron Nick	Not on coach																						Alex; Rochelle	Alex; Rochelle	Andy; Dan	Andy; Dan	Alex; James	Ashley; Georgia	Red Carded (Day 28)		
Ellie Kat	Not on coach																								Gareth; Mason	Holmest; Lauryn	Holmest; Lauryn	Red Carded (Day 27)			
Gareth Mason	Not on coach																			Alex; Ed	Holly; Lauren	Holly; Lauren	Alex; Rochelle	Alex; Rochelle	Andy; Dan	Red Carded (Day 25)					
Gareth Mason	Not on coach																			Alex; Ed	Holly; Lauren	Holmest; Lauryn	Alex; Rochelle	Alex; Rochelle	Andy; Dan	Red Carded (Day 25)					
Daniel Hannah	Not on Coach																		Alex; Ed	Andy; Dan	Holly; Lauren	Holly; Lauren	Holmest; Lauryn	Red Carded (Day 23)							
Daniel Hannah	Not on Coach																		Alex; Ed	Andy; Dan	Holly; Lauren	Holmest; Lauryn	Holmest; Lauryn	Red Carded (Day 23)							
Holly Lauren	Not on Coach																		Alex; Rochelle	Alex; Ed	Daniel; Hannah	Daniel; Hannah	Red Carded (Day 22)								
Holly Lauren	Not on Coach																		Alex; Rochelle	Alex; Ed	Daniel; Hannah	Andy; Dan	Red Carded (Day 22)								
Alex Ed	Not on Coach								Cancelled	Gina; Lisa	Alex; Rochelle	Alex; Rochelle	Alex; Rochelle	Josh; Liam	Abi; Jess	Holmest; Lauryn	Abi; Jess	Andy; Dan	Holmest; Lauryn	Holmest; Lauryn	Red Carded (Day 20)										
Josh Liam	Not on Coach											Hannah; Mike	Hannah; Mike	Hannah; Mike	Alex; Rochelle	Abi; Jess	Abi; Jess	Holmest; Lauryn	Holmest; Lauryn	Left	Walked (Day 20)										
Ashleigh Debbie	Not on Coach									Gina; Lisa	Gina; Lisa	Abi; Jess	Hannah; Mike	Hannah; Mike	Alex; Rochelle	Abi; Jess	Abi; Jess	Left	Walked (Middle of Day 18)												
Abi Jess	Not on Coach								Cancelled	Alex; Rochelle	Alex; Ed	Alex; Rochelle	Ashleigh; Debbie	Josh; Liam	Alex; Ed	Josh; Liam	Josh; Liam	Red Carded (Day 17)													
Hannah Mike	Not on Coach									Gina; Lisa	Gina; Lisa	Ashleigh; Debbie	Alex; Ed	Josh; Liam	Red Carded (Day 14)																
Gina Lisa	Not on Coach								Cancelled	Alex; Ed	Alex; Rochelle	Red Carded (Day 11)																			
Liam Sam	Amber; George	Banned	Amber; George	Dylan; Matt	Ellie; Tash	Dylan; Matt	Emma; Hannah	Refused	Removed (Day 8)																						
Jake Jordan	Ellie; Tash	Liam; Sam	Danny; Faye	Ellie; Tash	Ellie; Tash	Ellie; Tash	Enzo; Michelina	Refused	Removed (Day 8)																						
Emma Hannah	Amber; George	Amber; George	Ellie; Tash	Dylan; Matt	Ellie; Tash	Dylan; Matt	Enzo; Michelina	Refused	Removed (Day 8)																						
Dylan Matt	Amber; George	Liam; Sam	Liam; Sam	Jake; Jordan	Danny; Faye	Danny; Faye	Emma; Hannah	Refused	Removed (Day 8)																						
Danny Faye	Amber; George	Liam; Sam	Amber; George	Jake; Jordan	Ellie; Tash	Dylan; Matt	Emma; Hannah	Refused	Removed (Day 8)																						
Enzo Michelina	Not on Coach				Emma; Hannah	Jake; Jordan	Dylan; Matt	Left	Walked (Day 8)																						
Ellie Tash	Amber; George	Amber; George	Emma; Hannah	Jake; Jordan	Jake; Jordan	Emma; Hannah	Walked (End of Day 6)																								
Amber George	Liam; Sam	Liam; Sam	Emma; Hannah	Red Carded (Day 3)																											
Notes	None	^{1}	^{2}	None	^{3}	^{4}	None	^{5}	^{6}	None					^{7}	None		^{8}	None	^{9}	None	^{10}	None				^{11}			None	
Walked	None					Ellie; Tash	None	Enzo; Michelina	None									Ashleigh; Debbie	None	Josh; Liam	None										
Removed	None							^{See Note 5}	None																						
Voted Off	Amber; George; 5 votes	Liam; Sam; 4 votes	Amber; George; 2 votes	Jake; Jordan; 3 votes	Ellie; Tash; 4 votes	Dylan; Matt; 3 votes	Emma; Hannah; 3 votes	^{See Note 5}	None	Gina; Lisa; 4 votes	Gina; Lisa; 3 votes	Abi; Jess; 2 votes	Hannah; Mike; 3 votes	Hannah; Mike; 4 votes	None	Alex; Ed; 3 votes	Abi; Jess; 4 votes	Andy; Dan; 2 votes	Holmest; Lauryn; 3 votes	Alex; Ed; 4 votes	Holly; Lauren; 4 votes	Holly; Lauren; 5 votes	Daniel; Hannah; 3 votes	Gareth; Mason; 3 votes	Gareth; Mason; 4 votes	Aaron; Nick; 4 votes	Ellie; Kat; 3 votes	Aaron; Nick; 3 votes	Ashley; Georgia; 4 votes	None	
Voted Off	Amber; George; 5 votes	Liam; Sam; 4 votes	Amber; George; 2 votes	Jake; Jordan; 3 votes	Ellie; Tash; 4 votes	Dylan; Matt; 3 votes	Emma; Hannah; 3 votes	^{See Note 5}	None	Gina; Lisa; 4 votes	Gina; Lisa; 3 votes	Alex; Rochelle; 2 votes	Hannah; Mike; 3 votes	Hannah; Mike; 4 votes	None	Alex; Ed; 3 votes	Abi; Jess; 4 votes	Andy; Dan; 2 votes	Holmest; Lauryn; 3 votes	Alex; Ed; 4 votes	Holly; Lauren; 4 votes	Daniel; Hannah; 2 votes	Daniel; Hannah; 3 votes	Gareth; Mason; 3 votes	Gareth; Mason; 4 votes	Aaron; Nick; 4 votes	Ellie; Kat; 3 votes	Aaron; Nick; 3 votes	Ashley; Georgia; 4 votes	None	

=== Notes ===
^1 Liam & Sam were banned from voting, but they were eligible to being voted for, due to them waking up late and ended up receiving a yellow card.

^2 Brendan changed the voting for this episode, everyone was able to vote as normal but at the end Brendan would choose whose vote counted. This vote was Danny and Faye's vote, resulting in Amber and George receiving their second yellow card followed by their red card.

^3 Brendan stated that the winner of the afternoon challenge would be immune from the vote.

^4 After the voting had taken place, Tash received a call from her work. Which resulted in the couple having to leave the coach.

^5 On Day 8, Enzo & Michelina left the coach for personal reasons directly before the vote. Danny & Faye and Dylan & Matt won a paddleboarding race, and were awarded immunity for the vote. With the exception of Rochelle & Alex, who were new to the coach, all other contestants chose to refuse to vote. Due to their choice, all five couples were awarded red cards, including the two couples who were immune.

^6 Due to everyone on the coach are new, they are all immune from votes which resulted in no votes being made and therefore Brendan cancelled the vote.

^7 On Day 15 the couples were voting for their most popular couple to win a three-day immunity pass from the vote, Alex & Rochelle and Josh & Liam tied on 2 votes and the rest of the group decided to give Alex & Rochelle immunity until Day 19.

^8 After the first activity of the day Ashleigh & Debbie received a phone call from their work, which meant that they had to leave to coach to head back home.

^9 Brendan had received news from Josh & Liam, so he went to speak to them. They informed Brendan that they had to leave the coach as they were needed back at work.

^10 Brendan announced that tonights vote was a double yellow vote. Every couple had to vote for two couples, the two couples with the highest votes would receive a yellow card.

^11 Brendan announced that the voting from tonight would change. Which ever couple got the most votes would receive instant red card due to all couples canvassing for future votes on day 24. The system was similar to Celebrity Coach Trip.

== The Trip by Day ==
Day	Location	Activity	
Day	Location	Morning	Afternoon
1	Magaluf, Majorca	Rodeo bull riding	Catamaran ride
2	Alcúdia	Pirate acrobatics	Cliff jumping
3	Porto Cristo	Caves of Drach	Party games
4	Barcelona	Paella cooking	Flamenco dancing
5	Barcelona	Beach yoga	Life drawing
6	Girona	Goat-herding	Off-road Segways
7	Perpignan	Snail eating	Kite surfing
8	Agde	Paddleboarding	Caricature drawing
9	Montpellier	Blobbing	Pottery class
10	Lyon	Handball	Acting class
11	Marseille	Snorkeling	Pole dance lesson
12	Toulon	Bubble football	Street art festival
13	Fréjus	Wakeboarding	Scenic plane trip
14	Nice	Mime class	Escape Rooms
15	Monte Carlo	Sofaboating	Visited Monaco
16	Sanremo	Mixed Martial Arts	Pesto making
17	Genoa	Natural History Museum	Mini Golf
18	Portofino	Kayaking	Bowling
19	Pisa	Leaning Tower of Pisa	Windsurfing
20	Lucca, Tuscany	White Water Rafting	Tandem bicycle ride
21	Florence	Sculpting class	Pizza cooking class
22	Siena	Opera singing	Wine tasting
23	Bolsena	Natural thermal spring	Dissecting fish
24	Rome	Gladiator training school	Buggy ride tour
25	Tarragona	Zip wiring	Water park
26	Sitges	Mermaid/Merman school	Drag queens
27	Catalonia	Jet skiing	Sumo wrestling
28	Ibiza	Surf machine	Body painting
29	Ibiza	Sea bobbing	Go karting
30	Ibiza	Inflatable obstacle course	Pool party
