= Coach Trip series 12 =

Coach Trip
- Series 12
- No. of days: 20
- Winners: Joe & Nikki

Release
- Original network: Channel 4
- Original release: 2 March – 27 March 2015

Additional information
- Filming dates: October 2014 – November 2014

Series chronology
- ← Previous; Series 11 Next → Series 13

Coach Trip 12 is the twelfth series of Coach Trip in the United Kingdom. The series began airing on 2 March 2015 for 20 episodes, concluding on 27 March 2015.

It began on 2 March 2015, airing weekdays at 17:30 on Channel 4. The twelfth series saw Brendan Sheerin return as tour guide, as in all previous editions and Paul Donald continued as coach driver with MT09 MTT as the registration of the coach once again and Jackie Clune narrated the series. Filming took place between October and November 2014. The twelfth series lasted only 20 days.

== Contestants ==
Couple were aboard the coach	Couple got yellow carded
Couple were immune from votes	Couple got red carded
Couple left the coach	Couple were removed from the coach

Couple	Relationship	Trip Duration (Days)																			
Couple	Relationship	1	2	3	4	5	6	7	8	9	10	11	12	13	14	15	16	17	18	19	20
Megan & Tony (original 7)	Husband and wife	Yellow card	Red card	Eliminated 1st on 3 March 2015																	
Grace & Rachel (original 7)	Friends			Yellow card		Walked 1st on 5 March 2015															
Fiona & Matthew (original 7)	Husband and wife				Yellow card	Red card	Eliminated 2nd on 6 March 2015														
Rudi & Spencer (Replaced Megan & Tony)	Husband and wife	Not on coach						Yellow card	Red card	Eliminated 3rd on 11 March 2015											
Billie & Bobby (original 7)	Friends						Yellow card			Red card	Eliminated 4th on 12 March 2015										
Jess & Amy (Replaced Fiona & Matthew)	Friends	Not on Coach									Yellow card	Red card	Eliminated 5th on 16 March 2015								
Deccy & Louie (original 7)	Friends											Red card	Removed 1st on 16 March 2015								
Karima & Jamal (Replaced Jess & Amy)	Friends	Not on Coach													Yellow card	Red card	Eliminated 6th on 20 March 2015				
Arminel & Oliver (Replaced Deccy & Louie)	Mother & Son	Not on Coach															Yellow card	Red card	Eliminated 7th on 24 March 2015		
Sally & Sue (Replaced Karima & Jamal)	Friends	Not on coach																		Yellow card	Third on 27 March 2015
Barry & Christian (Replaced Billie & Bobby)	Friends	Not on coach											Yellow card								Third on 27 March 2015
Chloe & Ryan (Replaced Rudi & Spencer)	Couple	Not on coach																	Yellow card		Third on 27 March 2015
Carly & Charlie (original 7)	Friends										Yellow card										Third on 27 March 2015
Andy & Ruth (original 7)	Friends																			Yellow card	Second on 27 March 2015
Joe & Nikki (Replaced Grace & Rachel)	Friends	Not on coach												Yellow card							Winners on 27 March 2015

== The Trip by Day ==
Day	Location	Activity	
Day	Location	Morning	Afternoon
1	Split	Frotress tour	
2	Omis	Rock climbing	Local Flat Pie
3	Makarska	Inflatable assault course	Mandarin grove
4	Mostar	War tour	
5	Dubrovnik	Paddle boarding	A capella singing class
6	Herceg Novi	Squid ink cooking	Snorkelling
7	Budva	Tree-top rope course	Cocktail making
8	Bar	Beekeeping	
9	Bari	Octopus curling	
10	Taranto	Sea fishing	Caricature sculpture
11	Taranto	Milking olive trees	Pizza making
12	Lecce	Photo challenge	Folk dancing
13	Corfu	Aerobics class	Jet skiing
14	Corfu		Sailing
15	Ioannina	Frogs legs and eel sampling	Kayaking
16	Arta	Painting class	
17	Messolonghi	Language lesson	Spa
18	Patras	Wrestling	Winery
19	Loutraki	Yoga class	Pie making
20	Athens	Percussion lesson	Sea turtle sanctuary
