= Coach Trip series 10 =

Tenth series of Coach Trip

Coach Trip
- Series 10
- No. of days: 20
- Winners: Cherelle & Dino; Bill & Carol
- Runner-up: Craig & Will

Release
- Original network: Channel 4
- Original release: 27 October 2014

Additional information
- Filming dates: July 2014 – August 2014

Series chronology
- ← Previous; Series 9 Next → Series 11

Coach Trip is a British reality television game show that involves ordinary couples, with a pre-existing relationship, board a coach and travel to destinations around Europe on a 20-day tour. Those who board the coach have to try to avoid votes from the other couples on board, voting takes place at the end of each day of the trip. Series 10 began on 27 October 2014, airing weekdays at 17:30 on Channel 4, Brendan Sheerin return as tour guide, as in all previous editions. Filming took place between July and August 2014.

== Contestants ==
Couple were aboard the coach	Couple got yellow carded
Couple were immune from votes	Couple got red carded
Couple left the coach	Couple won a prize at the vote
Couple were removed from the coach

Couple	Relationship	Trip Duration (Days)																			
Couple	Relationship	1	2	3	4	5	6	7	8	9	10	11	12	13	14	15	16	17	18	19	20
Cherelle and Dino (Replaced Gregory and Liam)	Partners	Not on coach																Yellow card			Winners on 21 November 2014
Bill and Carol (Replaced Belinda and Paul)	Partners	Not on coach																	Yellow card		Winners on 21 November 2014
Craig and Will (original 7)	Friends																	Yellow card			Second on 21 November 2014
Lauren and Sharon (Replaced Jane and Sharran)	Mother & Daughter	Not on coach																Yellow card			Third on 21 November 2014
Jo and Lorna (Replaced Bernard and Diane)	Friends	Not on coach																			Third on 21 November 2014
Sapphire and Zedd (Replaced Alex and Laura)	Partners	Not on coach																		Yellow card	Third on 21 November 2014
Bradley and Ottavio (Replaced Joe and Robin)	Friends	Not on coach																Red card	Eliminated 8th on 18 November 2014		
Alex and Laura (Replaced Rebecca and Stephen)	Friends	Not on coach						Yellow card										Red card	Removed 1st on 18 November 2014		
Bernard and Diane (Replaced Ann and Carole)	Friends	Not on coach													Yellow card		Red card	Eliminated 7th on 17 November 2014			
Belinda and Paul (Replaced Julie and Terry)	Partners	Not on coach										Yellow card				Red card	Eliminated 6th on 14 November 2014				
Jane and Sharran (Replaced Caitlin and Natasha)	Friends	Not on coach											Yellow card	Red card	Eliminated 5th on 12 November 2014						
Joe and Robin (Replaced Emma and Mike)	Uncle & Nephew	Not on coach											Walked 3rd on 10 November 2014								
Ann and Carole (original 7)	Friends										Yellow card		Walked 2nd on 10 November 2014								
Georgy and Liam (original 7)	Friends	Yellow card								Red card	Eliminated 4th on 6 November 2014										
Caitlin and Natasha (original 7)	Friends								Red card	Eliminated 3rd on 5 November 2014											
Emma and Mike (original 7)	Partners			Yellow card			Red card	Eliminated 2nd on 3 November 2014													
Julie and Terry (original 7)	Husband and wife				Yellow card		Walked 1st on 31 October 2014														
Rebecca and Stephen (original 7)	Twins		Yellow card		Red card	Eliminated 1st on 30 October 2014															

== Voting history ==
Couple won the series	Couple were yellow carded	Couple won a prize at the vote
Couple were runners up	Couple were red carded	Couple were not present at the vote
Couple were third	Couple were immune from votes	Couple left the coach

	Day																				
	1	2	3	4	5	6	7	8	9	10	11	12	13	14	15	16	17	18	19	20	
Cherelle Dino	Not on Coach																Bradley; Ottavio				Winners
Bill Carol^{See Note 3}	Not on Coach																Bradley; Ottavio				Winners
Craig Will	Georgy; Liam	Rebecca; Stephen	Julie; Terry	Julie; Terry							Belinda; Paul						Bradley; Ottavio			Dino; Cherelle	Second
Lauren Sharon	Not on Coach																Bradley; Ottavio			Bill; Carol	Third
Jo Lorna	Not on Coach																Bradley; Ottavio			Will; Craig	Third
Sapphire Zedd	Not on Coach																				Third
Bradley Ottavio	Not on Coach																Craig; Will	Red Carded (Day 17)			
Alex Laura	Not on Coach										Belinda; Paul						^{See; Note 2}	Removed (Day 17)			
Bernard Diana	Not on Coach																Red Carded (Day 16)				
Belinda Paul	Not on Coach										Craig; Will				^{1}	Red Carded (Day 15)					
Jane Sharran	Not on Coach										Belinda; Paul			Red Carded (Day 13)							
Joe Robin	Not on Coach										Belinda; Paul	Walked (End of Day 11)									
Ann Carole	Georgy; Liam	Georgy; Liam	Julie; Terry	Emma; Mike								Walked (Beginning of Day 11)									
Georgy Liam	Ann; Carol	Rebecca; Stephen	Emma; Mike	Rebecca; Stephen						Red Carded (Day 10)											
Caitlin Natasha	Emma; Mike	Rebecca; Stephen	Emma; Mike	Rebecca; Stephen					Red Carded (Day 9)												
Emma Mike	Georgy; Liam	Ann; Carol	Caitlin; Natasha	Julie; Terry			Red Carded (Day 6)														
Julie Terry	Georgy; Liam	Rebecca; Stephen	Craig; Will	Ann; Carol		Walked (Beginning of Day 5)															
Rebecca Stephen	Terry; Julie	Georgy; Liam	Craig; Will	Caitlin; Natasha	Red Carded (Day 4)																
Walked	None				Julie; Terry	None					Carole; Ann	None									
Walked	None				Julie; Terry	None					Joe; Robin	None									
Removed	None																Alex; Laura	None			
Voted Off	Georgy; Liam; 4 votes	Rebecca; Stephen; 4 votes	Emma; Mike; 2 votes	Rebecca; Stephen; 2 votes	None	Emma; Mike; 4 votes	Natasha; Caitlin; 2 votes	Natasha; Caitlin; 3 votes	Georgy; Liam; 3 votes	Ann; Carole; 3 votes	Belinda; Paul; 4 votes	Jane; Sharran; 3 votes	Jane; Sharran; 3 votes	Bernard; Diane; 3 votes	Belinda; Paul; 4 votes	Bernard; Diane; 4 votes	Bradley; Ottavio; 5 votes	Bill; Carol; 4 votes	Sapphire; Zedd; 4 votes	None	
Voted Off	Georgy; Liam; 4 votes	Rebecca; Stephen; 4 votes	Emma; Mike; 2 votes	Julie; Terry; 2 votes	None	Emma; Mike; 4 votes	Natasha; Caitlin; 2 votes	Natasha; Caitlin; 3 votes	Georgy; Liam; 3 votes	Ann; Carole; 3 votes	Belinda; Paul; 4 votes	Jane; Sharran; 3 votes	Jane; Sharran; 3 votes	Bernard; Diane; 3 votes	Belinda; Paul; 4 votes	Bernard; Diane; 4 votes	Bradley; Ottavio; 5 votes	Bill; Carol; 4 votes	Sapphire; Zedd; 4 votes	None	

=== Notes ===
- ^1 On Day 15, it was revealed that the couple with the most votes would receive a red card. It was also revealed that no couples were immune, including Lauren and Sharran, who had joined that morning. This couple happened to be Belinda and Paul.
- ^2 On Day 17, every couple received a yellow card as some couples were being disorderly, and damaged some of the hotel property. This led to Laura and Alex being removed, despite the fact that they did not seem to be involved in the incident, as they were the only couple already on a yellow card. Bradley and Ottavio received a second yellow card at the vote, thus also leaving the coach.
- ^3 Bill & Carol previously appeared in series 9, but walked after only a few hours on the coach for medical reasons.

== The Trip Day-by-Day ==
Day	Location	Activity	
Day	Location	Morning	Afternoon
1	Scarborough	Chip shop catering	Caricature class
2	Rotterdam	Kangoo tour	Dutch gin museum
3	Arnhem	Open-air museum	Skateboarding lesson
4	Münster	Boating	Zoo visit
5	Bielefeld	Bossaball	Hammam
6	Hanover	Coffee bean tasting	Ice-hockey
7	Magdeburg	Summer tobogganing	Clown museum
8	Berlin	Cabaret class	Beer bike tour
9	Szczecin	Bowling	Cold war bunker
10	Myślibórz	Goat milking	Raft building
11	Poznań	Lollipop making	Language lesson
12	Konin	Fencing lesson	Chocolate bath
13	Łódź	Urban art class	Go-karting
14	Warsaw	Football stadium visit	History lesson
15	Łomża	Boat tour	Breakdancing class
16	Gołdap	Hay models	Baking Polish cakes
17	Alytus	Horse photography class	Zip-wiring
18	Vilnius	Sculpture park	Soviet-era bunker
19	Viciunai	Tai Chi class	Swamp hike
20	Riga	Opera singing	Segways
