= Coach Trip series 15 =

Coach Trip
- Season 15
- No. of days: 30
- Winners: Bradley & Kevin
- Runners-up: Faye & Holly

Release
- Original network: E4
- Original release: 16 January – 24 February 2017

Additional information
- Filming dates: October 2016 – November 2016

Series chronology
- ← Previous; Series 14 Next → Series 16

Coach Trip 15, also known as Coach Trip: Road to Marbs, is the fifteenth series of Coach Trip in the United Kingdom. The filming took place between October and November 2016. Production company 12 Yard confirmed that the series is a second "Road to..." version of Coach Trip. The series began airing on E4 on 16 January 2017 for 30 episodes concluding on 24 February 2017.

== Contestants ==
Couple were aboard the coach	Couple got yellow carded	Couple won a prize at the vote
Couple were immune from votes	Couple got red carded
Couple left the coach	Couple were not present at the vote

Couple	Relationship	Trip Duration (Days)																													
Couple	Relationship	1	2	3	4	5	6	7	8	9	10	11	12	13	14	15	16	17	18	19	20	21	22	23	24	25	26	27	28	29	30
Amber & Bex (original 7)	Friends	Yellow card		Red card	Eliminated 1st on 18 January 2017																										
Adam & Dhillan (original 7)	Friends		Yellow card		Red card	Eliminated 2nd on 19 January 2017																									
Kai & Modina (original 7)	Partners					Yellow card	Red card	Eliminated 3rd on 23 January 2017																							
Adam & Olivia (original 7)	Solo travellers					Yellow card		Red card	Eliminated 4th on 24 January 2017																						
Danny & John (replaced Amber & Bex)	Workmates	Not on coach							Yellow card	Red card	Eliminated 5th on 26 January 2017																				
Charlotte & Felicity (replaced Adam & Dhillan)	Sisters	Not on coach									Yellow card			Walked 1st on 31 January 2017																	
Grace & Kath (replaced Kai & Modina)	Solo travellers	Not on coach										Yellow card		Red card	Eliminated 6th on 1 February 2017																
Dani & Klara (replaced Grace & Kath)	Friends	Not on coach																	Yellow card	Red card	Eliminated 7th on 9 February 2017										
Kieran & Sam (original 7)	Workmates																Yellow card			Red card	Eliminated 8th on 9 February 2017										
Calvin & Conrad (original 7)	Friends															Yellow card					Red card	Eliminated 9th on 10 February 2017									
Anthony & Jestina (replaced Charlotte & Felicity)	Partners	Not on coach																				Yellow card	Red card	Eliminated 10th on 14 February 2017							
Becky & Chris (replaced Kieran & Sam)	Husband & wife	Not on coach																							Yellow card			Walked 2nd on 20 February 2017			
Amina & Breeny (replaced Calvin & Conrad)	Friends	Not on coach																						Yellow card				Red card	Eliminated 11th on 21 February 2017		
Alex & Tom (replaced Dani & Klara)	Friends	Not on coach																								Yellow card					Fourth on 24 February 2017
Adam & Adrianna (replaced Anthony & Jestina)	Solo travellers	Not on coach																											Yellow card		Fourth on 24 February 2017
Charley & Stacey (replaced Becky & Chris)	Sisters	Not on coach																												Yellow card	Fourth on 24 February 2017
Jake & Sophie (replaced Adam & Olivia)	Friends	Not on coach											Yellow card																		Third on 24 February 2017
Faye & Holly (original 7)	Friends																	Yellow card													Second on 24 February 2017
Bradley & Kevin (replaced Danny & John)	Partners	Not on coach													Yellow card																Winners on 24 February 2017

== Voting history ==
Couple won the series	Couple were yellow carded	Couple were not present at the vote
Couple were runners up	Couple were red carded	Couple won a prize at the vote
Couple were third	Couple were immune from votes
Couple were fourth	Couple left the coach

	Day																														
	1	2	3	4	5	6	7	8	9	10	11	12	13	14	15	16	17	18	19	20	21	22	23	24	25	26	27	28	29	30	
Bradley Kevin	Not on Coach											Jake; Sophie	Kieran; Sam	Calvin; Conrad	Calvin; Conrad	Kieran; Sam	Faye; Holly	Anthony; Jestina	Anthony; Jestina	Calvin; Conrad	Anthony; Jestina	Anthony; Jestina	Amina; Breeny	N/A	Alex; Tom	Faye; Holly	Adam; Adrianna	Adam; Adrianna	Adam; Adrianna	Faye; Holly	Winners (3 votes)
Faye Holly	Kai; Modina	Kai; Modina	Kai; Modina	Kai; Modina	Kai; Modina	Kai; Modina	Adam; Olivia	Danny; John	Danny; John	Charlotte; Felicity	Grace; Kath	Jake; Sophie	Grace; Kath	Calvin; Conrad	Kieran; Sam	Kieran; Sam	Anthony; Jestina	Dani; Klara	Anthony; Jestina	Calvin; Conrad	Anthony; Jestina	Anthony; Jestina	Becky; Chris	Becky; Chris	Alex; Tom	Jake; Sophie	Adam; Adrianna	Adam; Adrianna	Adam; Adrianna	Bradley; Kevin	Second (2 votes)
Faye Holly	Kai; Modina	Kai; Modina	Kai; Modina	Kai; Modina	Adam; Olivia	Kai; Modina	Adam; Olivia	Danny; John	Danny; John	Charlotte; Felicity	Grace; Kath	Jake; Sophie	Grace; Kath	Calvin; Conrad	Kieran; Sam	Kieran; Sam	Anthony; Jestina	Dani; Klara	Anthony; Jestina	Calvin; Conrad	Anthony; Jestina	Anthony; Jestina	Becky; Chris	Becky; Chris	Alex; Tom	Jake; Sophie	Adam; Adrianna	Adam; Adrianna	Adam; Adrianna	Bradley; Kevin	Second (2 votes)
Jake Sophie	Not on Coach								Danny; John	Charlotte; Felicity	Charlotte; Felicity	Calvin; Conrad	Grace; Kath	Bradley; Kevin	Calvin; Conrad	Kieran; Sam	Faye; Holly	Dani; Klara	Dani; Klara	Anthony; Jestina	Anthony; Jestina	Anthony; Jestina	Amina; Breeny	Becky; Chris	Alex; Tom	Faye; Holly	Amina; Breeny	Adam; Adrianna	Charley; Stacey	Faye; Holly	Third (1 vote)
Charley Stacey	Not on Coach																										Amina; Breeny	Adam; Adrianna	Adam; Adrianna	Bradley; Kevin	Fourth (0 votes)
Adam Adrianna	Not on Coach																								Becky; Chris	Jake; Sophie	Amina; Breeny	Bradley; Kevin	Charley; Stacey	Jake; Sophie	Fourth (0 votes)
Alex Tom	Not on Coach																				Anthony; Jestina	Anthony; Jestina	Amina; Breeny	Becky; Chris	Becky; Chris	Bradley; Kevin	Amina; Breeny	Adam; Adrianna	Charley; Stacey	Bradley; Kevin	Fourth (0 votes)
Amina Breeny	Not on Coach																				Bradley; Kevin	Jake; Sophie	Bradley; Kevin	Becky; Chris	Becky; Chris	Faye; Holly	Adam; Adrianna	Red Carded (Day 27)			
Becky Chris	Not on Coach																				Anthony; Jestina	Faye; Holly	Amina; Breeny	Faye; Holly	Alex; Tom	Left	Walked (Day 26)				
Anthony Jestina	Not on Coach													Jake; Sophie	Kieran; Sam	Faye; Holly	Calvin; Conrad	Dani; Klara	Dani; Klara	Calvin; Conrad	Bradley; Kevin	Bradley; Kevin	Red Carded (Day 22)								
Calvin Conrad	Amber; Bex	Amber; Bex	Amber; Bex	Adam; Dhillan	Adam; Olivia	Kai; Modina	Adam; Olivia	Danny; John	Danny; John	Charlotte; Felicity	Charlotte; Felicity	Jake; Sophie	Grace; Kath	Bradley; Kevin	Faye; Holly	Kieran; Sam	Faye; Holly	Anthony; Jestina	Faye; Holly	Anthony; Jestina	Red Carded (Day 20)										
Calvin Conrad	Amber; Bex	Amber; Bex	Amber; Bex	Adam; Dhillan	Kai; Modina	Kai; Modina	Adam; Olivia	Danny; John	Danny; John	Charlotte; Felicity	Charlotte; Felicity	Jake; Sophie	Grace; Kath	Bradley; Kevin	Faye; Holly	Kieran; Sam	Faye; Holly	Anthony; Jestina	Faye; Holly	Anthony; Jestina	Red Carded (Day 20)										
Kieran Sam	Amber; Bex	Adam; Dhillan	Kai; Modina	Adam; Dhillan	Kai; Modina	Kai; Modina	Adam; Olivia	Danny; John	Danny; John	Grace; Kath	Grace; Kath	Jake; Sophie	Grace; Kath	Bradley; Kevin	Calvin; Conrad	Faye; Holly	Faye; Holly	Dani; Klara	Dani; Klara	Red Carded (Day 19)											
Kieran Sam	Amber; Bex	Adam; Dhillan	Kai; Modina	Adam; Dhillan	Adam; Olivia	Kai; Modina	Adam; Olivia	Danny; John	Danny; John	Grace; Kath	Grace; Kath	Jake; Sophie	Grace; Kath	Bradley; Kevin	Calvin; Conrad	Faye; Holly	Faye; Holly	Dani; Klara	Dani; Klara	Red Carded (Day 19)											
Dani Klara	Not on Coach															Anthony; Jestina	Anthony; Jestina	Faye; Holly	Anthony; Jestina	Red Carded (Day 19)											
Grace Kath	Not on Coach							Danny; John	Danny; John	Charlotte; Felicity	Kieran; Sam	Jake; Sophie	Kieran; Sam	Red Carded (Day 13)																	
Charlotte Felicity	Not on Coach						Calvin; Conrad	Danny; John	Danny; John	Calvin; Conrad	Faye; Holly	Left	Walked (End of Day 12)																		
Danny John	Not on Coach					Kai; Modina	Kieran; Sam	Faye; Holly	Charlotte; Felicity	Red Carded (Day 9)																					
Adam Olivia	Adam; Dhillan	Adam; Dhillan	Amber; Bex	Adam; Dhillan	Kieran; Sam	Kai; Modina	Calvin; Conrad	Red Carded (Day 7)																							
Adam Olivia	Adam; Dhillan	Adam; Dhillan	Amber; Bex	Adam; Dhillan	Calvin; Conrad	Kai; Modina	Calvin; Conrad	Red Carded (Day 7)																							
Kai Modina	Faye; Holly	Faye; Holly	Amber; Bex	Adam; Dhillan	Faye; Holly	Kieran; Sam	Red Carded (Day 6)																								
Kai Modina	Faye; Holly	Faye; Holly	Amber; Bex	Adam; Dhillan	Kieran; Sam	Kieran; Sam	Red Carded (Day 6)																								
Adam Dhillan	Kai; Modina	Adam; Olivia	Kai; Modina	Adam; Olivia	Red Carded (Day 4)																										
Amber Bex	Adam; Olivia	Kai; Modina	Calvin; Conrad	Red Carded (Day 3)																											
Notes	None							^{1}	None			^{2}	None		^{3}	None								^{4}	None	^{5}	None		^{6}	None	
Walked	None											Charlotte; Felicity	None													Becky; Chris	None				
Voted Off	Amber; Bex; 2 votes	Adam; Dhillan; 2 votes	Amber; Bex; 3 votes	Adam; Dhillan; 4 votes	Kai; Modina; 3 votes	Kai; Modina; 5 votes	Adam; Olivia; 3 votes	Danny; John; 6 votes	Danny; John; 6 votes	Charlotte; Felicity; 4 votes	Grace; Kath; 2 votes	Jake; Sophie; 5 votes	Grace; Kath; 4 votes	Bradley; Kevin; 3 votes	Calvin; Conrad; 3 votes	Kieran; Sam; 4 votes	Faye; Holly; 4 votes	Dani; Klara; 4 votes	Dani; Klara; 3 votes	Calvin; Conrad; 3 votes	Anthony; Jestina; 5 votes	Anthony; Jestina; 4 votes	Amina; Breeny; 4 votes	Becky; Chris; 4 votes	Alex; Tom; 4 votes	None	Amina; Breeny; 4 votes	Adam; Adrianna; 5 votes	Charley; Stacey; 3 votes	None	
Voted Off	Amber; Bex; 2 votes	Adam; Dhillan; 2 votes	Amber; Bex; 3 votes	Adam; Dhillan; 4 votes	Adam; Olivia; 3 votes	Kai; Modina; 5 votes	Adam; Olivia; 3 votes	Danny; John; 6 votes	Danny; John; 6 votes	Charlotte; Felicity; 4 votes	Grace; Kath; 2 votes	Jake; Sophie; 5 votes	Grace; Kath; 4 votes	Bradley; Kevin; 3 votes	Calvin; Conrad; 3 votes	Kieran; Sam; 4 votes	Faye; Holly; 4 votes	Dani; Klara; 4 votes	Kieran; Sam; Chosen by Dani & Klara	Calvin; Conrad; 3 votes	Anthony; Jestina; 5 votes	Anthony; Jestina; 4 votes	Amina; Breeny; 4 votes	Becky; Chris; 4 votes	Alex; Tom; 4 votes	None	Amina; Breeny; 4 votes	Adam; Adrianna; 5 votes	Charley; Stacey; 3 votes	None	

=== Notes ===
^1 For winning the Segway Polo activity in the morning Charlotte & Felicity were given a "Double Vote" meaning that whoever they voted for would get two votes instead of one.

^2 For winning the raft-building activity in the afternoon, Grace & Kath, Kieran & Sam and Faye & Holly were awarded immunity from the vote. Charlotte & Felicity left as the vote was about to commence, meaning that only Calvin & Conrad and Jake & Sophie were eligible to be voted for

^3 On Day 15, Brendan announced that the next couple to receive a red card would be able to choose another couple to send home alongside them. This would be continuous until a couple gained a red card. This happened to be Dani & Klara on Day 19, who opted to send Kieran & Sam home.

^4 On Day 24, Bradley & Kevin were ill and did not participate in any of the day's activities, including the vote. They returned the next day.

^5 On Day 26, Brendan announced that this vote would be a 'Golden Card Vote' - the couple who received the most votes would be immune for the rest of the trip. This happened to be Faye & Holly.

^6 On Day 29, Brendan announced that this vote would be an anonymous vote - no-one would know who voted for whom. Each couple revealed their vote in an interview after that vote had taken place.

== The trip by day ==
Day	Location	Activity	
Day	Location	Morning	Afternoon
1	Majorca	Pole dancing	Water park
2	Majorca	Flyboarding	Ostrich farm
3	Majorca	Chorizo making	Rock climbing
4	Majorca	Quad biking	Massage
5	Balearic Sea	Caricatures	Dance fitness
6	Valencia	Science museum	Water balling
7	Valencia	Wrestling competition	Abseiling
8	Dénia	Segway polo	Bike tour
9	Xàbia	Jet skiing	Spa
10	Benidorm	Candle making	Go-karting
11	Benidorm	Benidorm circus	Parasailing
12	Alicante	Footgolf	Raft making
13	Torrevieja	Paddleboarding	Rhythmic gymnastics
14	San Pedro del Pinatar	Mud bath	Lifeguarding with dogs
15	San Pedro del Pinatar	Bootcamp	Spanish lesson
16	Águilas	Weaving	Yoga class
17	Almería	Transparent kayaking	Bolero dancing & clarinet playing
18	Tabernas	Camel riding	Cowboys & cowgirls
19	Alpujarras	Tapas making	Natural lagoons
20	Motril	Belly dancing	Beach games
21	Málaga	Flying	Clay modelling
22	Málaga	Theme park	The art of magic
23	Fuengirola	Zoo	Doughnuts in the sea
24	Antequera	Roller skating	Wolf farm
25	Seville	Glassblowing	Flamenco dancing
26	Jerez de la Frontera	Wakeboarding	Sherry tasting
27	Cádiz	Surfing	City tour challenge
28	Tarifa	Bushcraft	Blokarting
29	Estepona	Milking goats	Bossaball
30	Marbella	Beauty salon	Boat party
