= Coach Trip series 17 =

Coach Trip
- Season 17
- No. of days: 40
- Winners: Ali & Jon
- Runners-up: Ella & Simon; James & Matt; Amber & Jack

Release
- Original network: E4
- Original release: 8 January – 2 March 2018

Additional information
- Filming dates: 1 September – 22 October 2017

Series chronology
- ← Previous; Series 16 Next → Series 18

Coach Trip 17, also known as Coach Trip: Road to Tenerife, is the seventeenth series of Coach Trip in the United Kingdom. The series was confirmed by E4 during the last series (Road to Zante). Filming took place between 1 September and 22 October 2017. The series once again consists of 40 episodes, the same as the previous series, and follow the "Road to..." format. The series aired on E4 from 8 January to 2 March 2018 for 40 episodes. The first seven couples were confirmed on 29 December 2017.

== Contestants ==
Couple were aboard the coach	Couple got yellow carded	Couple won a prize at the vote
Couple were immune from votes	Couple got red carded	Couple refused to vote
Couple left the coach	Couple banned from voting	Couple were not present at the vote

Couple	Relationship	Trip duration (days)																																							
Couple	Relationship	1	2	3	4	5	6	7	8	9	10	11	12	13	14	15	16	17	18	19	20	21	22	23	24	25	26	27	28	29	30	31	32	33	34	35	36	37	38	39	40
Chloe & Samirah (original 7)	Friends	Yellow card	Walked 1st on 9 January 2018																																						
Hoogy & Jake (original 7)	Friends		Yellow card				Red card	Eliminated 1st on 15 January 2018																																	
Korey & Nathan (original 7)	Friends				Yellow card			Red card	Eliminated 2nd on 16 January 2018																																
Hannah & Helen (original 7)	Mother & daughter								Yellow card	Red card	Eliminated 3rd on 18 January 2018																														
Ellie & Ryan (original 7)	Friends					Yellow card						Walked 2nd on 19 January 2018																													
Adam & Lewis (replaced Hoogy & Jake)	Friends	Not on Coach									Yellow card	Red card	Eliminated 4th on 22 January 2018																												
Ben & Teleka (original 7)	Friends			Yellow card								Red card	Eliminated 5th on 22 January 2018																												
Jimmy & Jodie (original 7)	Solo travellers												Yellow card	Red card	Eliminated 6th on 24 January 2018																										
Deejay & Karis (replaced Adam & Lewis)	Friends	Not on Coach														Yellow card	Red card	Eliminated 7th on 29 January 2018																							
Connor & Tyler (replaced Ben & Teleka)	Friends	Not on Coach																Yellow card	Red card	Eliminated 8th on 31 January 2018																					
Jess & Sarah (replaced Jimmy & Jodie)	Solo travellers	Not on Coach																		Yellow card	Red card	Eliminated 9th on 2 February 2018																			
Lorna & Sam (replaced Hannah & Helen)	Friends	Not on Coach													Yellow card								Red card	Eliminated 10th on 6 February 2018																	
Kamen & Remus (replaced Ellie & Ryan)	Friends	Not on Coach																				Yellow card	Red card	Eliminated 11th on 6 February 2018																	
Pearl & Ruby (replaced Chloe & Samirah)	Sisters	Not on Coach																Yellow card									Walked 3rd on 9 February 2018														
DeDe & Princess (replaced Jess & Sarah)	Friends	Not on Coach																							Yellow card	Red card	Eliminated 12th on 9 February 2018														
Shaun & Troy (replaced Korey & Nathan)	Friends	Not on Coach																						Yellow card				Red card	Eliminated 13th on 13 February 2018												
Lisa & Rachel (replaced Lorna & Sam)	Friends	Not on Coach																									Yellow card	Red card	Eliminated 14th on 13 February 2018												
Chante & King (replaced Pearl & Ruby)	Friends	Not on Coach																											Yellow card		Red card	Eliminated 15th on 16 February 2018									
Jake & Jordan (replaced Shaun & Troy)	Friends	Not on Coach																														Yellow card	Red card	Eliminated 16th on 20 February 2018							
Alicia & Angelique (replaced Lisa & Rachel)	Solo travellers	Not on Coach																																Yellow card	Red card	Eliminated 17th on 22 February 2018					
Akin & Stanley (replaced Jake & Jordan)	Friends	Not on Coach																																			Yellow card	Red card	Eliminated 18th on 27 February 2018		
Charlotte & Paige (replaced Alicia & Angelique)	Friends	Not on Coach																																					Yellow card	Red card	Eliminated 19th on 1 March 2018
Becca & Jenn (replaced DeDe & Princess)	Friends	Not on Coach																																							Third on 2 March 2018
Amber & Jack (replaced Chante & King)	Husband & wife	Not on Coach																																		Yellow card					Second on 2 March 2018
James & Matt (replaced Kamen & Remus)	Partners	Not on Coach																																							Second on 2 March 2018
Ella & Simon (replaced Connor & Tyler)	Partners	Not on Coach																																							Second on 2 March 2018
Ali & Jon (replaced Deejay & Karis)	Friends	Not on Coach																																							Winners on 2 March 2018

== Voting history ==
Couple won the series	Couple were yellow carded	Couple banned from voting
Couple were runners up	Couple were red carded	Couple won a prize at the vote
Couple were third	Couple were immune from votes	Couple were not present at the vote
Couple were fourth	Couple left the coach	Couple refused to vote

	Day																																								
	1	2	3	4	5	6	7	8	9	10	11	12	13	14	15	16	17	18	19	20	21	22	23	24	25	26	27	28	29	30	31	32	33	34	35	36	37	38	39	40	
Ali Jon	Not on Coach																			Kamen; Remus	Shaun; Troy	Lorna; Sam	Shaun; Troy	DeDe; Princess	DeDe; Princess	Lisa; Rachel	James; Matt	N/A	Ella; Simon	Chante; King	Jake; Jordan	Jake; Jordan	Alicia; Angelique	Alicia; Angelique	Amber; Jack	Akin; Stanley	Akin; Stanley	Charlotte; Paige	Charlotte; Paige	Ella; Simon	Winners (2 votes)
Ali Jon	Not on Coach																			Kamen; Remus	Shaun; Troy	Lorna; Sam	Shaun; Troy	DeDe; Princess	DeDe; Princess	Lisa; Rachel	Lisa; Rachel	N/A	Ella; Simon	Chante; King	Jake; Jordan	Jake; Jordan	Alicia; Angelique	Alicia; Angelique	Amber; Jack	Akin; Stanley	Akin; Stanley	Charlotte; Paige	Charlotte; Paige	Ella; Simon	Winners (2 votes)
Ella Simon	Not on Coach																			Shaun; Troy	Lorna; Sam	Lorna; Sam	Shaun; Troy	DeDe; Princess	DeDe; Princess	Lisa; Rachel	Lisa; Rachel	N/A	Ali; Jon	Chante; King	Becca; Jenn	Becca; Jenn	Alicia; Angelique	Alicia; Angelique	Amber; Jack	Akin; Stanley	Akin; Stanley	Becca; Jenn	Becca; Jenn	Ali; Jon	Second (1 vote)
Ella Simon	Not on Coach																			Shaun; Troy	Lorna; Sam	Lorna; Sam	Shaun; Troy	DeDe; Princess	DeDe; Princess	Lisa; Rachel	Shaun; Troy	N/A	Ali; Jon	Chante; King	Becca; Jenn	Becca; Jenn	Alicia; Angelique	Alicia; Angelique	Amber; Jack	Akin; Stanley	Akin; Stanley	Becca; Jenn	Becca; Jenn	Ali; Jon	Second (1 vote)
James Matt	Not on Coach																								DeDe; Princess	Shaun; Troy	Lisa; Rachel	N/A	Ella; Simon	Chante; King	Jake; Jordan	Jake; Jordan	Alicia; Angelique	Alicia; Angelique	Amber; Jack	Akin; Stanley	Akin; Stanley	Charlotte; Paige	Charlotte; Paige	Amber; Jack	Second (1 vote)
James Matt	Not on Coach																								DeDe; Princess	Shaun; Troy	Shaun; Troy	N/A	Ella; Simon	Chante; King	Jake; Jordan	Jake; Jordan	Alicia; Angelique	Alicia; Angelique	Amber; Jack	Akin; Stanley	Akin; Stanley	Charlotte; Paige	Charlotte; Paige	Amber; Jack	Second (1 vote)
Amber Jack	Not on Coach																															Jake; Jordan	Alicia; Angelique	Alicia; Angelique	Becca; Jenn	Akin; Stanley	Akin; Stanley	Charlotte; Paige	Charlotte; Paige	James; Matt	Second (1 vote)
Becca Jenn	Not on Coach																											Chante; King	Chante; King	Chante; King	Jake; Jordan	Jake; Jordan	Alicia; Angelique	Amber; Jack	Amber; Jack	Akin; Stanley	Akin; Stanley	Charlotte; Paige	Charlotte; Paige	Ali; Jon	Fifth (0 votes)
Becca Jenn	Not on Coach																											Ali; Jon	Chante; King	Chante; King	Jake; Jordan	Jake; Jordan	Alicia; Angelique	Amber; Jack	Amber; Jack	Akin; Stanley	Akin; Stanley	Charlotte; Paige	Charlotte; Paige	Ali; Jon	Fifth (0 votes)
Charlotte Paige	Not on Coach																																			Amber; Jack	Becca; Jenn	Ali; Jon	James; Matt	Red Carded (Day 39)	
Akin Stanley	Not on Coach																																	Amber; Jack	Ali; Jon	James; Matt	Ali; Jon	Red Carded (Day 37)			
Alicia Angelique	Not on Coach																														Ali; Jon	Jake; Jordan	Ali; Jon	Amber; Jack	Red Carded (Day 34)						
Jake Jordan	Not on Coach																											James; Matt	Ella; Simon	Chante; King	Ali; Jon	James; Matt	Red Carded (Day 32)								
Jake Jordan	Not on Coach																											Chante; King	Ella; Simon	Chante; King	Ali; Jon	James; Matt	Red Carded (Day 32)								
Chante King	Not on Coach																									Ella; Simon	Shaun; Troy	N/A	James; Matt	Jake; Jordan	Red Carded (Day 30)										
Chante King	Not on Coach																									Ella; Simon	Ali; Jon	N/A	James; Matt	Jake; Jordan	Red Carded (Day 30)										
Lisa Rachel	Not on Coach																							Ella; Simon	DeDe; Princess	Ali; Jon	Shaun; Troy	Red Carded (Day 27)													
Lisa Rachel	Not on Coach																							Ella; Simon	DeDe; Princess	Ali; Jon	Ella; Simon	Red Carded (Day 27)													
Shaun Troy	Not on Coach								Hannah; Helen	Jimmy; Jodie	Jimmy; Jodie	Jimmy; Jodie	Jimmy; Jodie	Lorna; Sam	Deejay; Karis	Deejay; Karis	Connor; Tyler	Connor; Tyler	Jess; Sarah	Jess; Sarah	Kamen; Remus	Banned	Ali; Jon	DeDe; Princess	DeDe; Princess	Lisa; Rachel	James; Matt	Red Carded (Day 27)													
Shaun Troy	Not on Coach								Hannah; Helen	Jimmy; Jodie	Jimmy; Jodie	Jimmy; Jodie	Jimmy; Jodie	Lorna; Sam	Deejay; Karis	Deejay; Karis	Connor; Tyler	Connor; Tyler	Jess; Sarah	Jess; Sarah	Kamen; Remus	Banned	Ali; Jon	DeDe; Princess	DeDe; Princess	Lisa; Rachel	Lisa; Rachel	Red Carded (Day 27)													
DeDe Princess	Not on Coach																					Lorna; Sam	Shaun; Troy	Ella; Simon	Ali; Jon	Red Carded (Day 25)															
Pearl Ruby	Not on Coach		Hoogy; Jake	Hoogy; Jake	Ellie; Ryan	Hoogy; Jake	Ellie; Ryan	Ellie; Ryan	Ellie; Ryan	Adam; Lewis	Adam; Lewis	Jimmy; Jodie	Jimmy; Jodie	Kamen; Remus	Deejay; Karis	Deejay; Karis	Connor; Tyler	Connor; Tyler	Jess; Sarah	Jess; Sarah	Kamen; Remus	Kamen; Remus	Ella; Simon	N/A	Left	Walked (Day 25)															
Kamen Remus	Not on Coach											Jimmy; Jodie	Jimmy; Jodie	Lorna; Sam	Deejay; Karis	Deejay; Karis	Connor; Tyler	Jess; Sarah	Jess; Sarah	Jess; Sarah	Shaun; Troy	Banned	Red Carded (Day 22)																		
Lorna Sam	Not on Coach										Adam; Lewis	Jimmy; Jodie	Shaun; Troy	Shaun; Troy	Deejay; Karis	Deejay; Karis	Connor; Tyler	Connor; Tyler	Jess; Sarah	Jess; Sarah	Kamen; Remus	Banned	Red Carded (Day 22)																		
Jess Sarah	Not on Coach															Deejay; Karis	Connor; Tyler	Connor; Tyler	Lorna; Sam	Lorna; Sam	Red Carded (Day 20)																				
Connor Tyler	Not on Coach														Kamen; Remus	Pearl; Ruby	Pearl; Ruby	Jess; Sarah	Red Carded (Day 18)																						
Deejay Karis	Not on Coach												Pearl; Ruby	Lorna; Sam	Lorna; Sam	Pearl; Ruby	Red Carded (Day 16)																								
Jimmy Jodie	Chloe; Samirah	Hoogy; Jake	Ben; Teleka	Hoogy; Jake	Ben; Teleka	Hoogy; Jake	Korey; Nathan	Ben; Teleka	Hannah; Helen	Adam; Lewis	Shaun; Troy	Shaun; Troy	Lorna; Sam	Red Carded (Day 13)																											
Ben Teleka	Chloe; Samirah	Jimmy; Jodie	Korey; Nathan	Korey; Nathan	Jimmy; Jodie	Hannah; Helen	Korey; Nathan	Hannah; Helen	Hannah; Helen	Adam; Lewis	Adam; Lewis	Red Carded (Day 11)																													
Adam Lewis	Not on Coach							Hannah; Helen	Ben; Teleka	Jimmy; Jodie	Jimmy; Jodie	Red Carded (Day 11)																													
Ellie Ryan	Chloe; Samirah	Hoogy; Jake	Ben; Teleka	Korey; Nathan	Pearl; Ruby	Korey; Nathan	Korey; Nathan	Pearl; Ruby	Pearl; Ruby	Left	Walked (Day 10)																														
Hannah Helen	Chloe; Samirah	Ben; Teleka	Ben; Teleka	Korey; Nathan	Ben; Teleka	Korey; Nathan	Korey; Nathan	Ben; Teleka	Jimmy; Jodie	Red Carded (Day 9)																															
Korey Nathan	Ben; Teleka	Ben; Teleka	Hoogy; Jake	Ben; Teleka	Ellie; Ryan	Hoogy; Jake	Hannah; Helen	Red Carded (Day 7)																																	
Hoogy Jake	Jimmy; Jodie	Korey; Nathan	Jimmy; Jodie	Jimmy; Jodie	Jimmy; Jodie	Pearl; Ruby	Red Carded (Day 6)																																		
Chloe Samirah	Ben; Teleka	Walked (Day 1)																																							
Notes	None					^{1}	None				^{2}	None					^{3}	None				^{4}	None			^{5} ^{6}	^{7}	^{8}	^{9}	^{10}	None						^{11}	None			
Walked	Chloe; Samirah	None								Ellie; Ryan	None														Pearl; Ruby	None															
Voted Off	Chloe; Samirah; 4 votes	Hoogy; Jake; 2 votes	Ben; Teleka; 3 votes	Korey; Nathan; 3 votes	Ellie; Ryan; 2 votes	Hoogy; Jake; 3 votes	Korey; Nathan; 4 votes	Hannah; Helen; 2 votes	Hannah; Helen; 3 votes	Adam; Lewis; 3 votes	Adam; Lewis; 3 votes	Jimmy; Jodie; 4 votes	Jimmy; Jodie; 3 votes	Lorna; Sam; 3 votes	Deejay; Karis; 4 votes	Deejay; Karis; 5 votes	Connor; Tyler; 5 votes	Connor; Tyler; 4 votes	Jess; Sarah; 4 votes	Jess; Sarah; 4 votes	Kamen; Remus; 3 votes	Lorna; Sam; 3 votes	Shaun; Troy; 3 votes	DeDe; Princess; 3 votes	DeDe; Princess; 5 votes	Lisa; Rachel; 4 votes	Shaun; Troy; 4 votes	Chante; King; 2 votes	None	Chante; King; 5 votes	Jake; Jordan; 3 votes	Jake; Jordan; 5 votes	Alicia; Angelique; 5 votes	Alicia; Angelique; 4 votes	Amber; Jack; 4 votes	Akin; Stanley; 5 votes	Akin; Stanley; 1 vote	Charlotte; Paige; 4 votes	Charlotte; Paige; 4 votes	None	
Voted Off	Chloe; Samirah; 4 votes	Hoogy; Jake; 2 votes	Ben; Teleka; 3 votes	Korey; Nathan; 3 votes	Ellie; Ryan; 2 votes	Hoogy; Jake; 3 votes	Korey; Nathan; 4 votes	Hannah; Helen; 2 votes	Hannah; Helen; 3 votes	Adam; Lewis; 3 votes	Ben; Teleka; Chosen by Adam & Lewis	Jimmy; Jodie; 4 votes	Jimmy; Jodie; 3 votes	Lorna; Sam; 3 votes	Deejay; Karis; 4 votes	Deejay; Karis; 5 votes	Pearl; Ruby; 1 vote	Connor; Tyler; 4 votes	Jess; Sarah; 4 votes	Jess; Sarah; 4 votes	Kamen; Remus; 3 votes	Kamen; Remus; Chosen by Lorna & Sam	Shaun; Troy; 3 votes	DeDe; Princess; 3 votes	DeDe; Princess; 5 votes	Lisa; Rachel; 4 votes	Lisa; Rachel; 4 votes	Chante; King; 2 votes	None	Chante; King; 5 votes	Jake; Jordan; 3 votes	Jake; Jordan; 5 votes	Alicia; Angelique; 5 votes	Alicia; Angelique; 4 votes	Amber; Jack; 4 votes	Akin; Stanley; 5 votes	Akin; Stanley; 1 vote	Charlotte; Paige; 4 votes	Charlotte; Paige; 4 votes	None	

=== Notes ===
^1 On Day 6, Ellie & Ryan were immune from the vote after winning the mornings activity.

^2 On Day 11, Brendan announced that the couple that received a yellow card at the vote would be able to select another couple to automatically receive a yellow card. Dan & Lewis received their second yellow card, eliminating them from the trip and they chose Ben & Teleka to receive a yellow card which also eliminated them from the trip.

^3 On Day 17, Brendan announced that the two couples with the most votes would receive a yellow card.

^4 On Day 22, Brendan announced that the next couple to receive a red card would be able to choose another couple to receive a red card also. On that same day, Lorna & Sam received a red card and they chose Kamen & Remus to also receive a red card.

^5 On Day 26, Brendan announced that there would be a twist in every vote this week.

^6 On Day 26, Brendan announced that the winners of the morning activity, would be able to cast a double vote. Ella & Simon and James & Matt won the activity, therefore their votes were counted twice.

^7 On Day 27, Brendan announced that the vote would be a double yellow card vote, meaning each couple would vote twice.

^8 On Day 28, Brendan announced that only the new couples would vote, and that they would vote twice.

^9 On Day 29, Brendan announced that the couple with the most votes would win immunity until the end of the trip.

^10 On Day 30, Brendan announced that the couple with the most votes would receive an instant red card.

^11 On Day 37, Brendan announced that all couples would vote as normal, however only one couple's vote selected at random would count, and that the couple they had voted for would receive an instant red card.

== The trip by day ==
Day	Location	Activity	
Day	Location	Morning	Afternoon
1	Biarritz	Aqua jumping	Giant paddleboarding
2	San Sebastián	Jai alai	Bodyboarding
3	Bilbao	Sheep milking	Boat trip
4	Santander	Flyboarding	Forest assault course
5	Gijón	Traditional cider pouring	Asturian dancing
6	Laviana	Archery	Aerial yoga
7	A Coruña	Piscasso style painting	Judo
8	Santiago de Compostela	Showjumping	Flower arranging
9	Vigo	Catamaran sailing	Seafood tasting
10	Melgaço	White water rafting	Bridge jumping
11	Porto	Wakeboarding	Breakdancing
12	Porto	Wine tasting	Portuguese folk music
13	Coimbra	Pottery making	Alpaca grooming
14	Nazaré	Beach yoga	Beach football
15	Lisbon	Skateboarding	Helicopter ride
16	Lisbon	Mosaic making	Parkour
17	Lisbon	Custard tart making	Bubble football
18	Colares	Surfing	Paragliding
19	Sesimbra	Coasteering	Golf
20	Sines	Reflexology	Spikeball & frisbee
21	Odemira	Canoeing	Chocolate decorating
22	Aljezur	Zumba class	Hovercrafting
23	Lagos	Caldeirada making	Dolphin watching
24	Portimão	Cockerel sculpting	Jet skiing
25	Albufeira	Beach rounders	Sandcastle making
26	Almancil	Footgolf	Tai chi
27	Faro	Go-karting	Lawn bowls
28	Tavira	Paddleboarding	Tennis
29	Tavira	Mud spa	Zip wire
30	Seville	Scavenger hunt	Flamenco dancing
31	Lanzarote	Sea trekking	Quadracycling
32	Lanzarote	Beach volleyball	Diving competition
33	Lanzarote	Parasailing	Drag class
34	Lanzarote	Chocolate massage	Dune buggy ride
35	Lanzarote	Kayak polo	Belly dancing class
36	Gran Canaria	Sofa boating	Clown workshop
37	Gran Canaria	Rock climbing	Personal growth workshop with horses
38	Tenerife	Pedal boarding	Camel riding
39	Tenerife	Beach boot camp	Mermaid school
40	Tenerife	Water park	Boat party
