= Coach Trip series 9 =

Coach Trip
- Series 9
- No. of days: 30
- Winner: Emily & Annabelle
- Runners-up: Darren & James; Roy & Julia; Raz & Elv

Release
- Original network: Channel 4
- Original release: 27 January – 8 March 2014

Additional information
- Filming dates: September 2013 – October 2013

Series chronology
- ← Previous; Series 8 Next → Series 10

Coach Trip is a British reality television game show that involves ordinary couples, with a pre-existing relationship, board a coach and travel to destinations around Europe. Those who board the coach must also try to avoid periodic eliminations. The show was renewed for a ninth series following a lengthy hiatus; the eighth series aired back in 2012 before the London 2012 Summer Olympics and Paralympics.

It began on 27 January 2014, airing weekdays at 17:30 on Channel 4 from episodes 1 to 15, however was moved to an earlier timeslot of 17:00 from episodes 16 to 29 due to Superstar Dogs: Countdown to Crufts. Due to the 2014 Winter Paralympics opening ceremony on Channel 4, episode 30 was instead aired on More4 at 12:10 on 8 March 2014. The ninth series saw Brendan Sheerin return as tour guide, as in all previous editions and Paul Donald continue as coach driver, with MT09 MTT the registration of the coach once again. Filming took place between September and October 2013. The ninth series includes visits to Sardinia, being the first series to do so.

== Contestants ==
Indicates the couple were aboard the coach
Indicates that the couple were voted as the most popular couple and won series
Indicates that the couple were voted as the second most popular couple
Indicates that the couple were voted as the third most popular couple
Indicates the couple got a yellow card
Indicates the couple got a red card

Couple	Relationship	Trip Duration (Days)																													
Couple	Relationship	1	2	3	4	5	6	7	8	9	10	11	12	13	14	15	16	17	18	19	20	21	22	23	24	25	26	27	28	29	30
Kevin & Steve (original 7)	Executives from Folkestone				Yellow card	Red card	Eliminated 1st on 31 January 2014																								
Glen & Wendy (original 7)	Old friends from Nottingham			Yellow card			Red card	Eliminated 2nd on 3 February 2014																							
Kelly & Mark (original 7)	Partners from Manchester		Yellow card					Red card	Eliminated 3rd on 4 February 2014																						
Bill & Carol (replaced Glen & Wendy)	Friends from Ilkley	Not on coach									Walked 1st on 6 February 2014																				
Sandra & Silvana (original 7)	Mother and son's partner from East London								Yellow card	Red card	Eliminated 4th on 6 February 2014																				
Mandy & Margy (replaced Kelly & Mark)	Mother and daughter from Merseyside	Not on coach										Yellow card	Red card	Eliminated 5th on 11 February 2014																	
James & Tom (original 7)	Friends from Cowley	Yellow card												Red card	Eliminated 6th on 12 February 2014																
James & Nicole (replaced James & Tom)	Friends from Crawley	Not on coach															Yellow card		Walked 2nd on 18 February 2014												
Ceci & Denise (replaced Sandra & Silvana)	Friends from Argyll	Not on coach														Yellow card				Walked 3rd on 19 February 2014											
Debbie & Nikki (replaced Mandy & Margy)	Friends from Birmingham	Not on coach																	Yellow card	Red card	Eliminated 7th on 20 February 2014										
Ian & Karen (replaced James & Nicole)	Partners from Wrexham	Not on coach																			Yellow card	Red card	Eliminated 8th on 24 February 2014								
Ben & Nick (replaced Kevin & Steve)	Friends from Billericay	Not on coach																Yellow card					Red card	Eliminated 9th on 25 February 2014							
Noreen & Stacey (replaced Ceci & Denise)	Friends from Manchester	Not on coach																						Yellow card		Walked 4th on 27 February 2014					
Donna & Penelope (replaced Ian & Karen)	Friends	Not on coach																							Yellow card		Walked 5th on 28 February 2014				
Ravinder & Zack (replaced Ben & Nick)	Partners from Bridlington	Not on coach																								Yellow card	Red card	Eliminated 10th on 3 March 2014			
Liam & Victoria (replaced Donna & Penelope)	Colleagues	Not on coach																													Third
Georgina & Leah (replaced Noreen & Stacey)	Friends	Not on coach																										Yellow card			Third
Darren & James (original 7)	Partners from Penzance										Yellow card																				Second
Roy & Julia (replaced Bill & Carol)	Partners from Essex	Not on coach																													Second
Elv & Raz (replaced Debbie & Nikki)	Old friends	Not on coach																											Yellow card		Second
Emily & Annabelle (original 7)	Sisters from Sunderland														Yellow card																Winners

== Voting History ==
Indicates that the couple received a yellow card
Indicates that the couple was red carded off the trip
Indicates that the couple left the coach due to other reasons than being voted off or being removed from the coach
Indicates that the couple was immune from any votes cast against them due to it either being their first vote or winning immunity from the vote
Indicates that the couple were voted as the most popular couple and won series
Indicates that the couple were voted as the second most popular couple
Indicates that the couple were voted as the third most popular couple
Indicates that the couple were voted as the fourth most popular couple

	Day																													
	1	2	3	4	5	6	7	8	9	10	11	12	13	14	15	16	17	18	19	20	21	22	23	24	25	26	27	28	29	30
Emily Annabelle	Mark; Kelly	Glen; Wendy	Mark; Kelly	Mark; Kelly	Kevin; Steve	Glen; Wendy	Mark; Kelly	Silvana; Sandra	Ben; Nick	Ben; Nick	Margy; Mandy	Margy; Mandy	James; Tom	Ceci; Denise	Debbie; Nikki	Debbie; Nikki	Ceci; Denise	Debbie; Nikki	Debbie; Nikki	Ian; Karen	Ian; Karen	Ben; Nick	Noreen; Stacey	Donna; Penelope	Ravinder; Zack	Ravinder; Zack	Roy; Julia	Raz; Elv	Darren; James	Winners; 3 votes
Darren James	Glen; Wendy	Kevin; Steve	Glen; Wendy	Kevin; Steve	Kevin; Steve	Glen; Wendy	Mark; Kelly	James; Tom	Silvana; Sandra	Ben; Nick	Margy; Mandy	Ben; Nick	James; Tom	Debbie; Nikki	Ben; Nick	Debbie; Nikki	Ben; Nick	Debbie; Nikki	Debbie; Nikki	Ben; Nick	Ian; Karen	Ben; Nick	Noreen; Stacey	Donna; Penelope	Raz; Elv	Roy; Julia	Raz; Elv	Raz; Elv	Emily; Annabelle	Second; 1 vote
Roy Julia	Not on Coach									James; Tom	Margy; Mandy	Margy; Mandy	James; Tom	Emily; Annabelle	Ceci; Denise	James; Nicole	Debbie; Nikki	Debbie; Nikki	Debbie; Nikki	Ian; Karen	Ian; Karen	Ben; Nick	Noreen; Stacey	Donna; Penelope	Ravinder; Zack	Ravinder; Zack	Georgina; Leah	Raz; Elv	Emily; Annabelle	Second; 1 vote
Raz Elv	Not on Coach																				Ian; Karen	Ben; Nick	Noreen; Stacey	Donna; Penelope	Ravinder; Zack	Ravinder; Zack	Liam; Victoria	Darren; James	Emily; Annabelle	Second; 1 vote
Georgina Leah	Not on Coach																									Darren; James	Liam; Victoria	Roy; Julia	Raz; Elv	Third; 0 votes
Liam Victoria	Not on Coach																									Ravinder; Zack	Georgina; Leah	Raz; Elv	Roy; Julia	Third; 0 votes
Ravinder Zack	Not on Coach																							Emily; Annabelle	Roy; Julia	Raz; Elv	Red Carded (Day 26)			
Donna Penelope	Not on Coach																						Noreen; Stacey	Emily; Annabelle	Walked (Beginning of Day 25)					
Noreen Stacey	Not on Coach																			Ben; Nick	Ian; Karen	Darren; James	Raz; Elv	Walked (Beginning of Day 24)						
Ben Nick	Not on Coach					Mark; Kelly	Mark; Kelly	Silvana; Sandra	Silvana; Sandra	Darren; James	Margy; Mandy	Margy; Mandy	Emily; Annabelle	Ceci; Denise	Darren; James	James; Nicole	Ceci; Denise	Debbie; Nikki	Debbie; Nikki	Ian; Karen	Darren; James	Raz; Elv	Red Carded (Day 22)							
Ian Karen	Not on Coach																		Roy; Julia	Emily; Annabelle	Ben; Nick	Red Carded (Day 21)								
Debbie Nikki	Not on Coach												James; Tom	Emily; Annabelle	Darren; James	James; Nicole	Roy; Julia	Emily; Annabelle	Roy; Julia	Red Carded (Day 19)										
Ceci Denise	Not on Coach										Emily; Annabelle	Ben; Nick	James; Tom	Emily; Annabelle	Debbie; Nikki	James; Nicole	Ben; Nick	Walked (Beginning of Day 18)												
James Nicole	Not on Coach														Ceci; Denise	Ben; Nick	Walked (Day 17)													
James Tom	Kevin; Steve	Mark; Kelly	Mark; Kelly	Glen; Wendy	Kevin; Steve	Mark; Kelly	Mark; Kelly	Silvana; Sandra	Silvana; Sandra	Darren; James	Margy; Mandy	Margy; Mandy	Darren; James	Red Carded (Day 13)																
Margy Mandy	Not on Coach									Emily; Annabelle	Darren; James	Ben; Nick	Red Carded (Day 12)																	
Silvana Sandra	Mark; Kelly	Mark; Kelly	Glen; Wendy	Mark; Kelly	Kevin; Steve	Glen; Wendy	Mark; Kelly	Ben; Nick	James; Tom	Red Carded (Day 9)																				
Carol Bill	Not on Coach							Silvana; Sandra	Walked (Beginning of Day 9)																					
Mark Kelly	James; Tom	Emily; Annabelle	James; Tom	Kevin; Steve	Silvana; Sandra	Emily; Annabelle	James; Tom	Red Carded (Day 7)																						
Glen Wendy	Emily; Annabelle	Silvana; Sandra	James; Tom	Kevin; Steve	Silvana; Sandra	Emily; Annabelle	Red Carded (Day 6)																							
Kevin Steve	James; Tom	James; Tom	Darren; James	Glen; Wendy	Silvana; Sandra	Red Carded (Day 5)																								
Walked	none								Carol; Bill	none							James; Nicole	Ceci; Denise	none					Noreen; Stacey	Donna; Penelope	none				
Voted Off	James; Tom; 2 votes	Mark; Kelly; 2 votes	Glen; Wendy; 2 votes	Kevin; Steve; 3 votes	Kevin; Steve; 4 votes	Glen; Wendy; 3 votes	Mark; Kelly; 5 votes	Silvana; Sandra; 4 votes	Silvana; Sandra; 3 votes	Darren; James; 2 votes	Margy; Mandy; 5 votes	Margy; Mandy; 4 votes	James; Tom; 5 votes	Emily; Annabelle; 3 votes	Ceci; Denise; 2 votes	James; Nicole; 4 votes	Ben; Nick; 2 votes	Debbie; Nikki; 4 votes	Debbie; Nikki; 4 votes	Ian; Karen; 3 votes	Ian; Karen; 5 votes	Ben; Nick; 4 votes	Noreen; Stacey; 5 votes	Donna; Penelope; 4 votes	Ravinder; Zack; 3 votes	Ravinder; Zack; 4 votes	Georgina; Leah; 2 votes	Raz; Elv; 4 votes	none	

No post-vote arrivals, timekeepers or removals in series

== The Trip Day-by-Day ==
Day	Location	Activity	
Day	Location	Morning	Afternoon
1	Flanders Fields	World War I memorial	Belgian
2	Brussels	Chocolate tasting	Scuba diving
3	Luxembourg	Pottery lesson	Segway tour
4	Nancy	Giant foosball	Zip wire ride
5	Dijon	Kite museum	Blackcurrant museum
6	Lyon	Sausage making lesson	Aikido
7	Chambéry	Dairy farm	Micro-lighting
8	Turin	Hitball	Museum tour
9	Genoa	Pesto making	Go-karting
10	Livorno	Pizza-making lesson	Vespa museum
11	Sardinia (Part 1)	Italian lesson	Sea kayaking
12	Sardinia (Part 2)	Tree-top assault course	Sardinian delicacies
13	Nice	Tennis lesson	Marine park
14	Cannes	Mime class	Ballroom dancing
15	Aix-en-Provence	Hot air balloon ride	Painting class
16	Montpellier & Sète	Violin lesson	Pottery lesson
17	Perpignan	Snail farm	Banana boating
18	L'Estartit		Volleyball
19	Barcelona		Iconic Olympic venue
20	Salou	Fish gutting	Pole dancing
21	Valencia	Paella class	Bungee jumping
22	Benidorm	Circus training	Jet skiing
23	Alicante	Yoga class	Synchronised swimming lesson
24	Almeria	Archery lesson	Rug-making
25	Guadix		Modern-day cave dwellers
26	Granada	Flamenco class	Alhambra Palace
27	Antequera & Cordoba	Olive picking	Spanish folk singing
28	Golf lesson	Picasson art class	
29	Marbella	Dune buggy racing	Cocktail making
30	As the remaining tourists prepare to make the long journey home, Brendan looks back on his favourite and funniest moments of their six-week trip round Europe.		
