= Coach Trip series 13 =

Coach Trip
- Series 13
- No. of days: 20
- Winners: Jordan & Micky
- Runners-up: Barbara & James; Clemmie & Olivia

Release
- Original network: Channel 4
- Original release: 30 March – 24 April 2015

Additional information
- Filming dates: November 2014 – December 2014

Series chronology
- ← Previous; Series 12 Next → Series 14

Coach Trip 13 is the thirteenth series of Coach Trip in the United Kingdom. The series began airing on 30 March 2015 for 20 episodes, 3 days after the twelfth series concluded, concluding on 24 April 2015. These were the last 20 episodes of the original 80 that were commissioned in April 2014.

== Voting system ==
The Voting system on this series was:

The couple who got the most votes received a yellow card
If a couple already had a yellow card and got the most votes they received a second yellow card resulting in a red card

== Contestants ==
Couple were aboard the coach	Couple got yellow carded	Couple were removed
Couple were immune from votes	Couple got red carded	Couple weren't present
Couple walked	Vote was cancelled

Couple	Relationship	Trip Duration (Days)																			
Couple	Relationship	1	2	3	4	5	6	7	8	9	10	11	12	13	14	15	16	17	18	19	20
Maureen & Michael (original 7)	Fiancés	Yellow card	Red card	Eliminated 1st on 31 March 2015																	
Dan & Nikki (original 7)	Mother and son			Yellow card	Red card	Eliminated 2nd on 2 April 2015															
Clive & Kevin (replaced Maureen & Michael)	Friends	Not on coach					Yellow card	Red card	Eliminated 3rd on 7 April 2015												
Gill & Julie (original 7)	Work friends									Walked 1st on 8 April 2015											
David & Mandy (original 7)	Friends					Yellow card					Walked 2nd on 9 April 2015										
Graham & Nimm (replaced Clive & Kevin)	Husband and wife	Not on coach											Walked 3rd on 13 April 2015								
Amy & James (original 7)	Friends									Yellow card			Red card	Removed 1st on 14 April 2015							
Josh & Ollie (original 7)	Best friends										Yellow card		Red card	Removed 2nd on 14 April 2015							
Christabel & Melissa (original 7)	Partners				Yellow card									Walked 4th on 14 April 2015							
Lauren & Lizzy (replaced Dan & Nikki)	Friends	Not on coach							Yellow card					Red card	Eliminated 4th on 15 April 2015						
Sue & Yvonne (replaced Graham & Nimm)	Friends	Not on coach													Yellow card	Red card	Eliminated 5th on 17 April 2015				
Christina & Karen (replaced Gill & Julie)	Friends	Not on coach																Walked 5th on 20 April 2015			
Angela & Jerry (replaced Sue & Yvonne)	Husband and wife	Not on coach																Yellow card			Third on 24 April 2015
Quin & Shelina (replaced Christabel & Melissa)	Best friends	Not on coach																	Yellow card		Third on 24 April 2015
Jamal & Richard (replaced David & Mandy)	Best friends	Not on coach										Yellow card									Third on 24 April 2015
Clemmie & Olivia (replaced Josh & Ollie)	Mother and daughter	Not on coach															Yellow card				Second on 24 April 2015
Barbara & James (replaced Lauren & Lizzy)	Mother and son	Not on coach																		Yellow card	Second on 24 April 2015
Jordan & Micky (replaced Amy & James)	Friends	Not on coach														Yellow card					Winners on 24 April 2015

== Voting history ==
Couple won the series	Couple were yellow carded	Couple were not present at the vote
Couple were runners up	Couple were red carded	Vote was cancelled
Couple were third	Couple were immune from votes
Couple left the coach	Couple were removed from the coach

	Day																				
	1	2	3	4	5	6	7	8	9	10	11	12	13	14	15	16	17	18	19	20	
Jordan Micky	Not on Coach												Karen; Christina	Sue; Yvonne	Christina; Karen	Clemmie; Olivia	Angela; Jerry	Quin; Shelina	Barbara; James	Clemmie; Olivia	Winners (4 votes)
Barbara James	Not on Coach															Clemmie; Olivia	Angela; Jerry	Quin; Shelina	Quin; Shelina	Jordan; Micky	Second (1 vote)
Clemmie Olivia	Not on Coach												Karen; Christina	Sue; Yvonne	Sue; Yvonne	Quin; Shelina	Angela; Jerry	Barbara; James	Barbara; James	Jordan; Micky	Second (1 vote)
Jamal Richard	Not on Coach									Amy; James	Josh; Oli		Lauren; Lizzy	Sue; Yvonne	Sue; Yvonne	Quin; Shelina	Angela; Jerry	Barbara; James	Barbara; James	Barbara; James	Third (0 votes)
Quin Shelina	Not on Coach														Clemmie; Olivia	Clemmie; Olivia	Jamal; Richard	Angela; Jerry	Angela; Jerry	Jordan; Micky	Third (0 votes)
Angela Jerry	Not on Coach															Clemmie; Olivia	Barbara; James	Quin; Shelina	Quin; Shelina	Jordan; Micky	Third (0 votes)
Christina Karen	Not on Coach									Josh; Oli	Christabel; Melissa		Lauren; Lizzy	Sue; Yvonne	Jordan; Micky		Walked (Day 16)				
Sue Yvonne	Not on Coach												Lauren; Lizzy	Christina; Karen	Jordan; Micky	Red Carded (Day 15)					
Lauren Lizzy	Not on Coach					Clive; Kevin	Clive; Kevin	Josh; Oli	Amy; James	Josh; Oli	Jamal; Richard		Jamal; Richard	Red Carded (Day 13)							
Christabel Melissa	Maureen; Michael	David; Mandy	Dan; Nikki	Dan; Nikki	David; Mandy	Clive; Kevin	Clive; Kevin	Lauren; Lizzy	Amy; James	Josh; Oli	Jamal; Richard		Walked (Middle of Day 12)								
Josh Oli	Dan; Nikki	Maureen; Michael	Dan; Nikki	Christabel; Melissa	David; Mandy	Clive; Kevin	Clive; Kevin	Lauren; Lizzy	Lauren; Lizzy	Amy; James	Jamal; Richard		Removed (Beginning of Day 12)								
Amy James	Maureen; Michael	Maureen; Michael	Dan; Nikki	Dan; Nikki	David; Mandy	Clive; Kevin	Clive; Kevin	Lauren; Lizzy	Josh; Oli	Josh; Oli	Jamal; Richard		Removed (Beginning of Day 12)								
Graham Nimm	Not on Coach									Josh; Oli		Walked (Beginning of Day 11)									
David Mandy	Maureen; Michael	Maureen; Michael	Dan; Nikki	Christabel; Melissa	Amy; James	Clive; Kevin	Clive; Kevin	Josh; Oli		Walked (Beginning of Day 9)											
Gill Julie	Dan; Nikki	Maureen; Michael	Dan; Nikki	Amy; James	David; Mandy	Clive; Kevin	Clive; Kevin		Walked (End of Day 8)												
Clive Kevin	Not on Coach				David; Mandy	David; Mandy	Amy; James	Red Carded (Day 7)													
Dan Nikki	Maureen; Michael	N/A	Christabel; Melissa	Gill; Julie	Red Carded (Day 4)																
Maureen Michael	Dan; Nikki	David; Mandy	Red Carded (Day 2)																		
Notes	None	^{1}	None					^{2}	^{3}	None	^{4}	^{5} ^{6} ^{7}	None			^{8}	None				
Walked	None							Gill; Julie	David; Mandy	None	Graham; Nimm	Christabel; Melissa	None			Christina; Karen	None				
Removed	None											Amy; James	None								
Removed	None											Josh; Oli	None								
Voted Off	Maureen; Michael; 4 votes	Maureen; Michael; 4 votes	Dan; Nikki; 5 votes	Dan; Nikki; 2 votes	David; Mandy; 5 votes	Clive; Kevin; 6 votes	Clive; Kevin; 6 votes	Lauren; Lizzy; 3 votes	Amy; James; 2 votes	Josh; Oli; 5 votes	Jamal; Richard; 4 votes	None	Lauren; Lizzy; 6 votes	Sue; Yvonne; 4 votes	Sue; Yvonne; 2 votes	Clemmie; Olivia; 4 votes	Angela; Jerry; 4 votes	Quin; Shelina; 3 votes	Barbara; James; 3 votes	None	
Voted Off	Maureen; Michael; 4 votes	Maureen; Michael; 4 votes	Dan; Nikki; 5 votes	Christabel; Melissa; 2 votes	David; Mandy; 5 votes	Clive; Kevin; 6 votes	Clive; Kevin; 6 votes	Lauren; Lizzy; 3 votes	Amy; James; 2 votes	Josh; Oli; 5 votes	Jamal; Richard; 4 votes	None	Lauren; Lizzy; 6 votes	Sue; Yvonne; 4 votes	Jordan; Micky; 2 votes	Clemmie; Olivia; 4 votes	Angela; Jerry; 4 votes	Quin; Shelina; 3 votes	Barbara; James; 3 votes	None	

=== Notes ===
^1 Due to Nikki's injury in the afternoon skiing session, she and Dan both had to leave for hospital before the vote. This meant that they could not cast a vote or receive any votes. The announcement that Dan and Nikki are returning was announced during the third episode on 1 April 2015.

^2 Julie had to go to the hospital to take a look at her swollen ankle, the doctor informed her that she had to rest it for 48 hours meaning that they had to leave the coach.

^3 David and Mandy had to leave the coach due to work related problems back in the UK. The couple informed Brendan and the other couples before everyone boarded outside the hotel.

^4 Graham and Nimm had made up their mind that because Nimm was tired during the afternoon activity the day before that she did not want to continue on the trip.

^5 Amy & James and Josh & Oli were both yellow carded due to keeping Brendan up during the night, this resulted in them being removed from the coach.

^6 Christabel and Melissa had to leave due to Christabel falling ill.

^7 Due to 3 of the couples leaving the coach that day, Brendan cancelled the vote.

^8 One of the couple received a message from home informing them that someone had fallen ill resulting in them having to leave the coach.

== The Trip by Day ==
Day	Location	Activity	
Day	Location	Morning	Afternoon
1	Prague	Puppet workshop	Beer bottling
2	Pelhřimov	Museum of curiosity and records	Grass skiing
3	Brno	Contact improvisation	Ossuary
4	Mistelbach	21st Century yodelling	Museum of pre-history, ancient history and medieval archeology
5	Vienna	Chocolate factory	Viennese Waltz class
6	Győr	Interactive science museum	Water polo
7	Budapest (Part 1)	Escape room	Massage lesson
8	Budapest (Part 2)	Hungarian language lesson	Bicycle tour
9	Siófok	Folk dancing lesson	Fish gutting lesson
10	Maribor	Toboggan ride	Grape crushing
11	Zagreb	Museum of broken relationships	Knight school
12	Karlovac	Aerial silk dancing	Eco-plastering
13	Rijeka	Aquaspeed	Majorette lesson
14	Novigrad, Istria County	Deep sea fishing	Clay pigeon shooting
15	Grado, Friuli-Venezia Giulia	Sandcastle competition	Ballet lesson
16	Venice	Venetian mask painting lesson	Gondola ride
17	Ferrara	Castle tour	Balloon sculpting
18	Bologna (Part 1)	Cooking lesson	Gelato making lesson
19	Bologna (Part 2)	Farm visit & Sheep shearing	Opera singing
20	Florence	Sculpting lesson	Walking tour of Florence
