= Coach Trip series 18 =

Coach Trip
- Series 18
- No. of days: 30
- Winners: Andy & James
- Runners-up: Kamesha & Shanice; Isaac & Dec; Chelsea & Stelle

Release
- Original network: E4
- Original release: 28 January – 8 March 2019

Additional information
- Filming dates: 6 May – 8 July 2018

Series chronology
- ← Previous; Series 17

Coach Trip 18, also known as Coach Trip: Road to Barcelona, is the eighteenth and final series of Coach Trip in the United Kingdom. The series was confirmed by E4 in 2018 with filming taking place between 6 May 2018 and 8 July 2018, before the filming started on Celebrity Coach Trip: Road to Benidorm. The series aired for 30 episodes from 28 January 2019 to 8 March 2019.

== Contestants ==
Couple were aboard the coach	Couple got yellow carded	Couple won a prize at the vote
Couple were immune from votes	Couple got red carded
Couple left the coach	Couple banned from voting	Couple were not present at the vote

Couple	Relationship	Trip Duration (Days)																													
Couple	Relationship	1	2	3	4	5	6	7	8	9	10	11	12	13	14	15	16	17	18	19	20	21	22	23	24	25	26	27	28	29	30
David (original 7)	Solo travellers	Yellow card			Walked 1st on 30 January 2019																										
Jasmine (original 7)	Solo travellers	Yellow card		Red card	Eliminated 1st on 30 January 2019																										
Connie & Jamie (original 7)	Partners		Yellow card				Red card	Eliminated 2nd on 4 February 2019																							
Ali & Kat (original 7)	Friends					Yellow card			Red card	Eliminated 3rd on 6 February 2019																					
Melissa & Poppy (original 7)	Friends										Walked 2nd on 7 February 2019																				
Brandon & Luke (original 7)	Partners							Yellow card			Red card	Eliminated 4th on 8 February 2019																			
Cem & Nuriye (original 7)	Brother & sister				Yellow card									Red card	Eliminated 5th on 13 February 2019																
Jess & Kiana (replaced David & Jasmine)	Friends	Not on Coach													Walked 3rd on 13 February 2019																
Goffy & James (original 7)	Friends									Yellow card					Red card	Eliminated 6th on 14 February 2019															
Cheri & Rachel (replaced Melissa & Poppy)	Friends	Not on Coach															Yellow card		Walked 4th on 19 February 2019												
Kyle & Milan (replaced Ali & Kat)	Partners	Not on Coach											Yellow card					Red card	Eliminated 7th on 19 February 2019												
Amelia & Luca (replaced Brandon & Luke)	Friends	Not on Coach																	Yellow card		Red card	Eliminated 8th on 22 February 2019									
Olivia & Tommy (replaced Jess & Kiana)	Cousins	Not on Coach																		Yellow card		Red card	Eliminated 9th on 25 February 2019								
Jamie & Louis (replaced Goffy & James)	Friends	Not on Coach																			Yellow card					Red card	Eliminated 10th on 1 March 2019				
Danii & Kay (replaced Olivia & Tommy)	Partners	Not on Coach																										Red card	Eliminated 11th on 5 March 2019		
Annabel & Rachel (replaced Cheri & Rachel)	Friends	Not on Coach																						Yellow card						Red card	Eliminated 12th on 7 March 2019
Charley & Charlie (replaced Jamie & Louis)	Friends	Not on Coach																													Third on 8 March 2019
Chelsea & Stelle (replaced Amelia & Luca)	Solo travellers	Not on Coach																							Yellow card						Second on 8 March 2019
Kamesha & Shanice (replaced Cem & Nuriye)	Friends	Not on Coach																					Yellow card								Second on 8 March 2019
Dec & Isaac (replaced Connie & Jamie)	Friends	Not on Coach										Yellow card																			Second on 8 March 2019
Andy & James (replaced Kyle & Milan)	Brothers	Not on Coach																													Winners on 8 March 2019

== Voting history ==
Couple won the series	Couple were yellow carded	Couple banned from voting
Couple were runners up	Couple were red carded	Couple won a prize at the vote
Couple were third	Couple were immune from votes	Couple were not present at the vote
Couple were fourth	Couple left the coach

	Day																														
	1	2	3	4	5	6	7	8	9	10	11	12	13	14	15	16	17	18	19	20	21	22	23	24	25	26	27	28	29	30	
Andy James	Not on Coach																		Olivia; Tommy	Amelia; Luca	Olivia; Tommy	Kamesha; Shanice	Annabel; Rachel	Chelsea; Stelle	Annabel; Rachel	Dec; Isaac	Danii; Kay	Chelsea; Stelle	Charley; Charlie	Dec; Isaac	Winners (2 votes)
Dec Isaac	Not on Coach							Ali; Kat	Brandon; Luke	Brandon; Luke	Jess; Kiana	Kyle; Milan	Cem; Nuriye	Kyle; Milan	Kyle; Milan	Amelia; Luca	Amelia; Luca	Amelia; Luca	Kamesha; Shanice	Kamesha; Shanice	Kamesha; Shanice	Kamesha; Shanice	Annabel; Rachel	Chelsea; Stelle	Annabel; Rachel	Andy; James	Danii; Kay	Andy; James	Charley; Charlie	Andy; James	Second (1 vote)
Kamesha Shanice	Not on Coach														Dec; Isaac	Cheri; Rachel	Kyle; Milan	Amelia; Luca	Dec; Isaac	Jamie; Louis	Andy; James	Dec; Isaac	Jamie; Louis	Jamie; Louis	Danii; Kay	Annabel; Rachel	Andy; James	Andy; James	Charley; Charlie	Chelsea; Stelle	Second (1 vote)
Chelsea Stelle	Not on Coach																					Dec; Isaac	Annabel; Rachel	Andy; James	Dec; Isaac	Andy; James	Danii; Kay	Annabel; Rachel	Annabel; Rachel	Andy; James	Second (1 vote)
Charley Charlie	Not on Coach																										Annabel; Rachel	Andy; James	Chelsea; Stelle	Kamesha; Shanice	Third (0 votes)
Annabel Rachel	Not on Coach																		Olivia; Tommy	Amelia; Luca	Olivia; Tommy	Andy; James	Dec; Isaac	Chelsea; Stelle	Jamie; Louis	Kamesha; Shanice	Danii; Kay	Dec; Isaac	Chelsea; Stelle	Red Carded (Day 29)	
Danii Kay	Not on Coach																						Dec; Isaac	Dec; Isaac	Andy; James	Kamesha; Shanice	Dec; Isaac	Red Carded (Day 27)			
Jamie Louis	Not on Coach																Kamesha; Shanice	Amelia; Luca	Olivia; Tommy	Amelia; Luca	Olivia; Tommy	Kamesha; Shanice	Annabel; Rachel	Chelsea; Stelle	Annabel; Rachel	Red Carded (Day 25)					
Olivia Tommy	Not on Coach														Dec; Isaac	Cheri; Rachel	Kyle; Milan	Amelia; Luca	Jamie; Louis	Jamie; Louis	Annabel; Rachel	Red Carded (Day 21)									
Amelia Luca	Not on Coach												Dec; Isaac	Goffy; James	Kyle; Milan	Cheri; Rachel	Kyle; Milan	Olivia; Tommy	Dec; Isaac	Jamie; Louis	Red Carded (Day 20)										
Kyle Milan	Not on Coach								Jess; Kiana	Cem; Nuriye	Dec; Isaac	Cem; Nuriye	Cem; Nuriye	Goffy; James	Cheri; Rachel	Amelia; Luca	Olivia; Tommy	Red Carded (Day 17)													
Cheri Rachel	Not on Coach										Dec; Isaac	Cem; Nuriye	Cem; Nuriye	Dec; Isaac	Dec; Isaac	Amelia; Luca	Left	Walked (Day 17)													
Goffy James	David; Jasmine	Brandon; Luke	Jasmine	Banned	Ali; Kat	Connie; Jamie	Brandon; Luke	Ali; Kat	Jess; Kiana	Brandon; Luke	Jess; Kiana	Jess; Kiana	Cem; Nuriye	Kyle; Milan	Red Carded (Day 14)																
Jess Kiana	Not on Coach				Brandon; Luke	Connie; Jamie	Melissa; Poppy	Goffy; James	Goffy; James	Dec; Isaac	Goffy; James	Goffy; James	Goffy; James	Walked (Day 13)																	
Cem Nuriye	David; Jasmine	Connie; Jamie	Jasmine	Banned	Connie; Jamie	Connie; Jamie	Brandon; Luke	Ali; Kat	Goffy; James	Brandon; Luke	Dec; Isaac	Kyle; Milan	Goffy; James	Red Carded (Day 13)																	
Brandon Luke	Ali; Kat	Cem; Nuriye	Goffy; James	Cem; Nuriye	Ali; Kat	Melissa; Poppy	Cem; Nuriye	Goffy; James	Goffy; James	Dec; Isaac	Red Carded (Day 10)																				
Melissa Poppy	David; Jasmine	Connie; Jamie	Jasmine	Connie; Jamie	Ali; Kat	Goffy; James	Ali; Kat	Jess; Kiana	Left	Walked (Day 9)																					
Ali Kat	David; Jasmine	Connie; Jamie	Brandon; Luke	Melissa; Poppy	Goffy; James	Connie; Jamie	Goffy; James	Melissa; Poppy	Red Carded (Day 8)																						
Connie Jamie	Ali; Kat	Cem; Nuriye	Jasmine	Cem; Nuriye	Melissa; Poppy	Brandon; Luke	Red Carded (Day 6)																								
Jasmine	Ali; Kat	Melissa; Poppy	Goffy; James	Red Carded (Day 3)																											
David	Ali; Kat	Melissa; Poppy	Left	Walked (Day 3)																											
Notes	None		^{1}	^{2}	^{3} ^{4}	None				^{5}	None		^{6}	None	^{7}	None				^{8}	^{9} ^{10}	^{11}	^{12}	^{13}	None						
Walked	None		David	None					Melissa; Poppy	None			Jess; Kiana	None			Cheri; Rachel	None													
Voted Off	David; Jasmine; 4 votes	Connie; Jamie; 3 votes	Jasmine; 4 votes	Cem; Nuriye; 2 votes	Ali; Kat; 3 votes	Connie; Jamie; 4 votes	Brandon; Luke; 2 votes	Ali; Kat; 3 votes	Goffy; James; 3 votes	Brandon; Luke; 4 votes	Dec; Isaac; 3 votes	Kyle; Milan; 2 votes	Cem; Nuriye; 4 votes	Goffy; James; 2 votes	None	Cheri; Rachel; 3 votes	Kyle; Milan; 3 votes	Amelia; Luca; 4 votes	Olivia; Tommy; 3 votes	Amelia; Luca; 3 votes	Olivia; Tommy; 3 votes	Kamesha; Shanice; 3 votes	Annabel; Rachel; 4 votes	Chelsea; Stelle; 4 votes	Jamie; Louis; 1 vote	None	Danii; Kay; 4 votes	None	Annabel; Rachel; Chosen by Charley & Charlie	None	
Voted Off	David; Jasmine; 4 votes	Connie; Jamie; 3 votes	Jasmine; 4 votes	Cem; Nuriye; 2 votes	Ali; Kat; 3 votes	Connie; Jamie; 4 votes	Brandon; Luke; 2 votes	Ali; Kat; 3 votes	Goffy; James; 3 votes	Brandon; Luke; 4 votes	Dec; Isaac; 3 votes	Kyle; Milan; 2 votes	Cem; Nuriye; 4 votes	Goffy; James; 2 votes	None	Cheri; Rachel; 3 votes	Kyle; Milan; 3 votes	Amelia; Luca; 4 votes	Olivia; Tommy; 3 votes	Jamie; Louis; Chosen by Amelia & Luca	Olivia; Tommy; 3 votes	Kamesha; Shanice; 3 votes	Annabel; Rachel; 4 votes	Chelsea; Stelle; 4 votes	Jamie; Louis; 1 vote	None	Danii; Kay; 4 votes	None	Annabel; Rachel; Chosen by Charley & Charlie	None	

=== Notes ===
^1 On Day 3, David left the coach before the vote, as she was a solo traveller Jasmine remained on the coach and at the evenings vote the couples could vote for her. She received her second yellow card after getting 4 votes and was eliminated from the trip.

^2 On Day 4, Cem & Nuriye and Goffy & James were banned from voting due to unacceptable behaviour the previous night. Cem & Nuriye would subsequently receive their first yellow card at the vote.

^3 On Day 5, Brendan announced that there would be a twist in the vote every Friday.

^4 On Day 5, Brendan announced that the couple that received the yellow card at the evenings vote would choose another couple to give immunity to at Day 6's vote, Ali & Kat were given the yellow card and granted Cem & Nuriye immunity, meaning they would be immune from the vote for the second consecutive day.

^5 On Day 10, Brendan announced that the winners of the morning activity, would be able to cast a double vote. Dec & Isaac, Jess & Kiana and Kyle & Milan won the activity, therefore their votes were counted twice.

^6 On Day 13, Jess & Kiana left the coach as they were outraged that Cem & Nuriye had been voted off.

^7 On Day 15, Brendan announced that the couple with the most votes would win three days immunity. This ended up being Isaac & Dec.

^8 On Day 20, Brendan announced that the couple that received a yellow card at the vote would be able to select another couple to automatically receive a yellow card. Amelia & Luca received their second yellow card and chose Jamie & Louis to receive their first yellow card.

^9 On Day 25, Brendan announced that all couples would vote as normal, however only one couple's vote selected at random would count, and that the couple they had voted for would receive a yellow card. This ended up being Annabel & Rachel's vote, sending Jamie & Louis home.

^10 On Day 26, Brendan announced that there would be a twist in every vote this week.

^11 On Day 26, Brendan announced that the couple with the most votes would win immunity until the end of the trip. Kamesha & Shanice received the most votes and received immunity for the rest of the trip.

^12 On Day 27, Brendan announced that the couple with the most votes would receive an instant red card. This ended up being Danii & Kay, who subsequently stormed out during the vote.

^13 On Day 28, Brendan announced that the couple with the most votes would win immunity until the end of the trip, as well as this, the couple with the most votes would also choose another couple to win immunity until the end of the trip also. Andy & James and Isaac & Dec received immunity for the rest of the trip.

^14 On Day 29, Brendan announced that the couple with the most votes would win immunity until the end of the trip, as well as this, the couple with the most votes would also choose a couple to receive an instant red card. Charley & Charlie received immunity and they sent Annabel & Rachel home.

== The trip by day ==
Day	Location	Activity	
Day	Location	Morning	Afternoon
1	Split	Ballet class	Picigin
2	Split	Catamaran ride	Penalty shootout
3	Šibenik	Falconry	Silent circle dancing
4	Vodice	Helicopter ride	Beach volleyball
5	Zadar	Kayaking	Traditional Croatian games
6	Pag	Standup paddleboarding	Mud bath
7	Pag	Quad biking	Sea slider inflatable
8	Selce	Glass art workshop	Dog training
9	Rijeka	Sumo wrestling	LARPing
10	Rabac	Ultimate frisbee	Parasailing
11	Pula	Cliff jumping	Gladiator battle
12	Pula	Segway jousting	Human catapult
13	Poreč	Nature workshop	Istrian cookery lesson
14	Koper	Octopush	Apitherapy
15	Trieste	Conscious movement dancing	Italian lesson
16	Jesolo	Go-karting	Wakesurfing
17	Venice	Opera singing	Gondoliering
18	Verona	Love sonnets	Tiramisu making
19	Lake Garda	Theme park	Motorboating
20	Bergamo	Fencing	Circus skills
21	Milan	Bubble football	Aerial gymnastics
22	Voghera	Supercar driving	Cowboys & cowgirls
23	Genoa	Pesto making	Christopher Columbus treasure hunt
24	Olbia	Snorkeling	Military boot camp
25	Olbia	Windsurfing	Wine tasting
26	San Teodoro	Pottery class	Aqua aerobics
27	Olbia	Cheese tasting	Yoga
28	Castelldefels	Water obstacle course	Krav Maga
29	Barcelona	Shark cage diving	Roller blading
30	Barcelona	Final showdown games	Pool party
