= Semi-submarine =

Boat with underwater windows

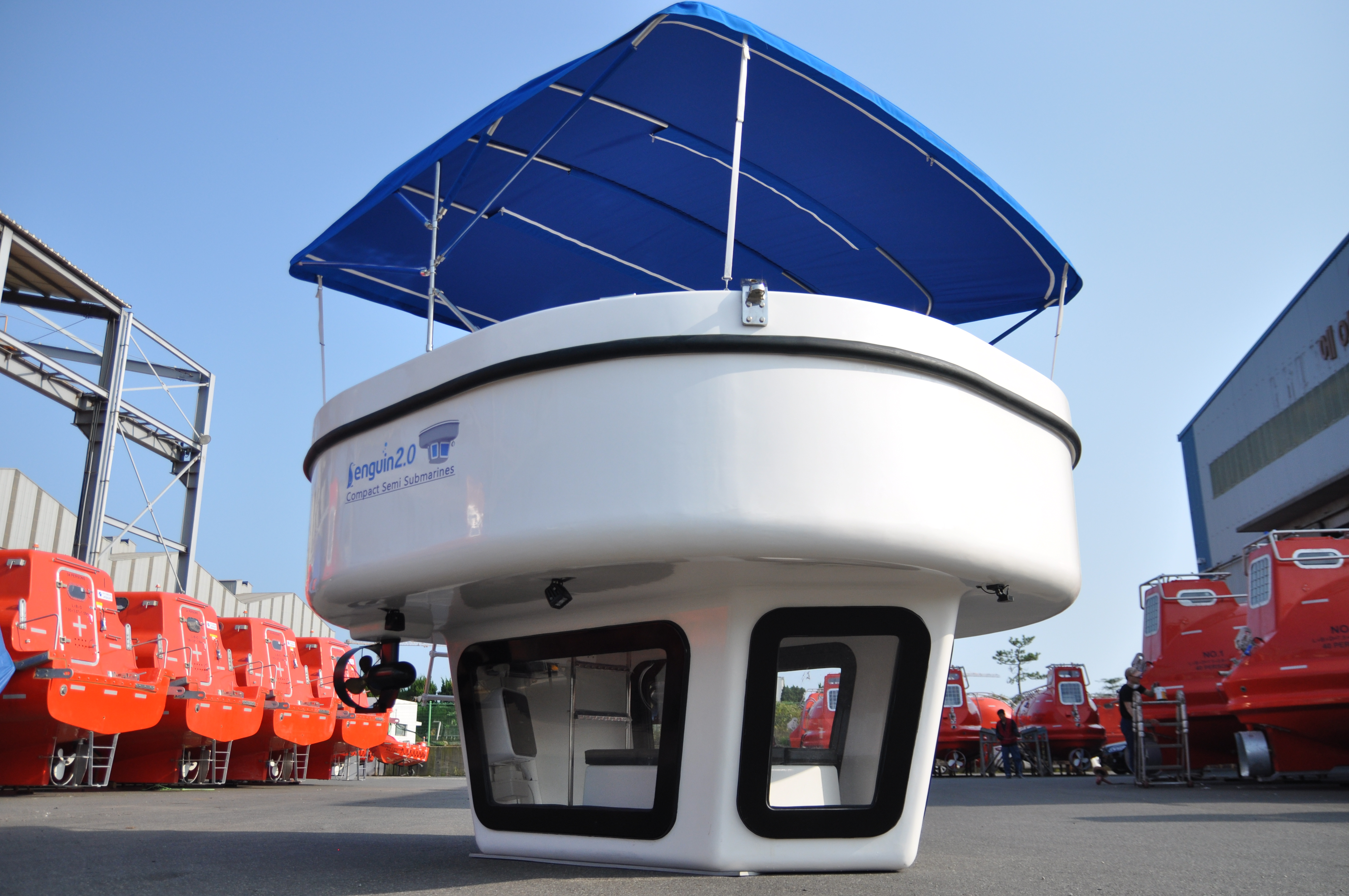
A semi-submarine, taken out of the water

A semi-submarine (semi-sub) is a surface vessel that is not capable of diving, but has accommodation space below the waterline featuring underwater windows. The watercraft is similar to glass-bottom boats, but with deeper draft. Both types of boats are mainly used to provide sight-seeing trips for tourists in clear, calm, and often shallow waters.

== Design ==
The most common design is similar to a small ship. The passenger cabin is deep within the hull, a few meters below the waterline. The cabin is equipped with large underwater windows, so the passengers can observe the marine environment that is passed during the voyage.

There are significant engineering differences between a true submarine and a semi-submarine. Submarines are human-occupied pressure vessels subjected to high external pressure, while semi-submarines are only subjected to the same pressures as other surface vessels of similar draft operating in similar conditions. As the hydrostatic pressure close to the water surface is relatively low, the viewing windows can be large. In some designs, the windows enclose the majority of the immersed hull. Passengers can climb up from the submerged cabin to the unsubmerged deck level at any time.

Since the semi-sub interior is always open to the atmosphere, no special measures must be taken to assure a supply of breathable air to its occupants.

== Use ==
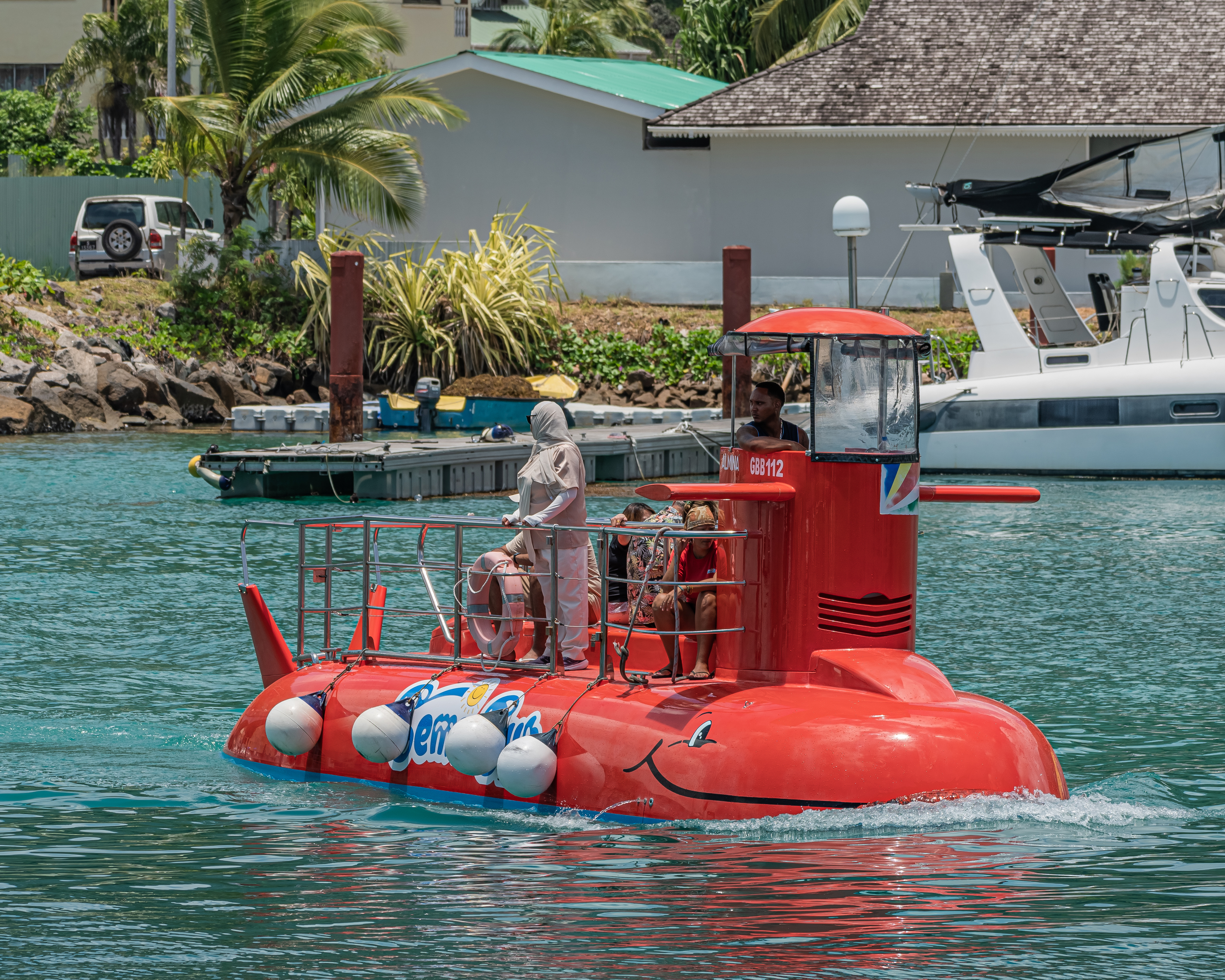
A tourist semi-submarine in Seychelles

Semi-submarines can be used for research, but they are most commonly used in the tourism business. However, large tourism-oriented semi-submarines should not be confused with narco-submarines which are smaller home-made semi-submarines used to smuggle drugs.

== Legal status ==
Semi-submarines do not have an international classified status. Their operating range from the native port might be limited by the local authorities.

== See also ==
- Semi-submersible naval vessel
