= Blobbing =

Water activity

Flying on the Blob

Blobbing is an outdoor water activity in which a participant sits on the end of a partly inflated air bag (known as a water trampoline or blob) and is launched into the water when another participant jumps onto the air bag from a platform on the opposite side. The activity is popular at summer camps in North America. Various tricks may also be performed while the participant is in the air. The air bag is approximately 10 meters (33 feet) long by 2 meters (6.6 feet) wide. The recommended height for the tower is 15 feet above the water surface, or 10 feet above the air bag.

== History ==
The original blobs used were military surplus items. The "blob" was nothing other than a floating fuel tank that ships could tow. Since oil and gas floats on top of water, the fuel-filled bladders floated next to the ships. The first blobbers were the sailors who would jump from the ship, onto the "blob," although the first recorded use of the blob was in Camp Longhorn, a summer camp near Austin, Texas in which the founders' sons used the blob in the camp's canoe bay. Tex Robertson, Pat Robertson, and Bill Johnson, founders of Camp Longhorn, revised the blob for the summer camp.

The first Blobs were made by a company in Texas. They decided to no longer manufacturer them. Spike White of Kanakuk Kamps in Branson, Missouri brought an old single ply version of the Blob that had been made in Texas to Jack and Lorie Hunt with Springfield Special Products in 1985 to see if they could manufacture it. They took it and made changes to the design that the Blob has today. It is a two ply heavy weight coated vinyl that comes in 25', 30', 35' and 40'. The Blobs are sold all over the world. There are distributors in several countries.

Springfield Special Products holds the national registration for the names The Blob and Waterblob in the US.

== Blobbing Battle ==
In 2011, the organizer Blob Europe arranged the first championships in Blobbing, called Blobbing Battle. The first year took place only in Austria, and from 2012 onward in other countries too. Teams (2 Jumpers & 1 Blobber) battled against each other on a knock-out basis. Blobbing Battle 2011 takes place on 7 tourstops through Austria.

== World record ==
The current official Guinness World Record "greatest height achieved by being launched from an airbag" is 22 meters (72 feet 2 inches) and was set on 7 June 2012 by Christian "Elvis" Guth, Christian von Cranach and Patrik Baumann, a German blob team in Hamburg/Norderstedt (D).
