= Brendan Sheerin =

TV presenter

- Born: 23 February 1959 (age 67); Leeds, West Yorkshire, England
- Occupations: Travel guide, television presenter
- Years active: International tour guide (1980–present); TV personality (2005–present)
- Employer: Channel 4
- Television: Coach Trip (2005–2022)
- Partner: Leslie (1976–2001; his death)
- Website: Official website

Brendan Sheerin (born 23 February 1959) is a British international tour guide, television personality, pantomime actor and author, who appeared on the reality TV show Coach Trip (2005–2022) on Channel 4.

== Career ==
=== Television ===
Since 2005, Sheerin has appeared in the Channel 4 television series Coach Trip. He acts as a travel guide for the contestants, commentator on their conduct and coordinator of the vote off.

In 2012, Sheerin signed a deal to host a new dating show for Channel 4, titled Brendan's Love Boat. Brendan's Love Cruise began on More4 on 2 December 2013. A temporary replacement show for Coach Trip, Brendan's Magical Mystery Tour, aired on Channel 4 in June and July 2013. After a one-year break, Coach Trip returned in 2014 for a ninth series.

=== Other projects ===
Sheerin appeared in pantomime for the first time in December 2010, and in 2012 played the part of the baron at the Alhambra Theatre in Bradford opposite Lynda Bellingham. Sheerin is the former entertainments manager of The Spa, Scarborough.

In 2011, Sheerin released his autobiography "My Life: A Coach Trip Adventure".

== Personal life ==
Sheerin was born into a Roman Catholic family of Irish extraction, in Leeds in the North of England. He attended Corpus Christi high school. His home is in Málaga, Spain. Sheerin is a fluent Spanish speaker and also speaks a good level of French.

Sheerin is gay and was in a 25-year relationship until his life partner Leslie died of heart failure on 28 December 2001 at their home in Flixton, North Yorkshire.
