= Celebrity Big Brother (British TV series) =

British reality television series

- The Celebrity Big Brother 24 eye
- Genre: Reality competition
- Based on: Big Brother by John de Mol Jr.
- Presented by: Davina McCall; Brian Dowling; Emma Willis; AJ Odudu; Will Best
- Starring: Celebrity Big Brother Housemates
- Narrated by: Marcus Bentley
- Theme music composer: Elementfour
- Opening theme: "Big Brother UK TV Theme"
- Country of origin: United Kingdom
- Original language: English
- No. of series: 24
- No. of episodes: 650

Production
- Production locations: 3 Mills Studios (2001); Elstree Studios (2002–18); Garden Studios (2024); Versa Studios (2025–)
- Production companies: Bazal (series 1); Endemol UK Productions (series 2–3); Brighter Pictures (series 4–6, Celebrity Hijack); Remarkable Television (series 7); Initial (series 8–present)

Original release
- Network: Channel 4
- Release: 9 March 2001 – 27 January 2010
- Network: Channel 5
- Release: 18 August 2011 – 10 September 2018
- Network: ITV1
- Release: 4 March 2024 – present

Related
- Big Brother

Celebrity Big Brother is a British television reality television based on the Dutch show Big Brother, created by producer John de Mol Jr. in 1997, which aired from 9 March 2001 to 10 September 2018, and again since 4 March 2024. The show follows a number of celebrity contestants, known as housemates, who were isolated from the outside world for an extended period of time in a custom-built house. Each week, one of the housemates is evicted by a public vote, with the last housemate named the winner. The series takes its name from the character in George Orwell's 1949 novel Nineteen Eighty-Four.

Celebrity Big Brother began as a one-time spin-off series to the original Big Brother UK and premiered on Channel 4 on 9 March 2001. Following the successful first series, the show returned the following year for a second series. Though the show did not air for the next two years, it returned in 2005 and 2006. Following the highly controversial fifth series in 2007, the show did not return in 2008. It did air in 2009, but it was officially axed after the seventh series in 2010 when Channel 4 chose to cancel the programme as well as the main series. Despite this, it was picked up by Channel 5, and Celebrity Big Brother returned in 2011. Between 2012 and 2018, two editions of Celebrity Big Brother aired each year, with one airing in January and one airing following the conclusion of the civilian series in August. The show was initially hosted by Davina McCall from its inception to its cancellation by Channel 4. Despite being offered the position of host following the show's move to Channel 5, McCall chose not to return. Brian Dowling, who had won on Big Brother 2 and Ultimate Big Brother, replaced McCall as the host of the series. Dowling hosted the eighth to eleventh series, before being replaced by Emma Willis from the twelfth series until the show's cancellation on Channel 5 following the twenty-second series. Following the show's relaunch on ITV in March 2024, AJ Odudu and Will Best will host the show from the twenty-third series onwards. Marcus Bentley has narrated the series since its inception in 2001.

Much like its predecessor, Celebrity Big Brother was met with commercial success and has also received extensive media coverage and publicity since it premiered. It has been covered in spin-off series such as Big Brother's Big Mouth and Big Brother's Bit on the Side, which also covered the main series. Similar to the parent series, Celebrity Big Brother has been the source of much controversy and criticism, most notably during the 2007 series. Following this, a spin-off series known as Big Brother: Celebrity Hijack aired in 2008 in the place of Celebrity Big Brother. It has been noted that numerous celebrities who have appeared on the series have become more prominent figures in the media than before.

On 14 September 2018, Channel 5 announced that Big Brother and Celebrity Big Brother would not be returning to the channel after the end of the nineteenth regular series. The twenty-second series of Celebrity Big Brother ended on 10 September 2018 and was the final series to air on Channel 5.

In August 2022, ITV plc announced that they were reviving Big Brother. The series relaunched in October 2023, which subsequently led to media speculation as to whether they would revive the celebrity version. In November 2023, ITV announced the relaunch of Celebrity Big Brother, beginning with the twenty-third series airing in March 2024 on ITV (ITV1 and STV). The show was rested in 2026, but was reportedly set to return in 2027. However, in July 2026, there have been unconfirmed reports that ITV had made the decision not to bring the show back for another series due to challenges ITV have been facing signing up big names to take part in the show.

== History ==
=== Main series ===
==== Channel 4 (2001–2010) ====
In 2000, the reality series Big Brother premiered in the United Kingdom and immediately became a ratings success. Following the success of the first series, it was confirmed that a celebrity edition of the show was in the works. Celebrity Big Brother aired in March 2001 as a one-time special on Channel 4 in association with the BBC's Comic Relief charity telethon. Due to the tie-in with Comic Relief, the first series was partly broadcast on BBC One in the week leading up to the telethon. It lasted for eight days, and was ultimately won by comedian Jack Dee. With the first series proving to be a success, a second series was later confirmed. Celebrity Big Brother 2 premiered on 20 November 2002, and concluded when Mark Owen was crowned the winner after 10 days in the house. Celebrity Big Brother did not air for the next two years, with Channel 4 choosing to air the spin-off series Teen Big Brother: The Experiment in 2003 and Big Brother Panto in 2004. In 2005, the show officially returned with its third series, which launched on 6 January. Lasting for a total of eighteen days, the series was won by Mark "Bez" Berry. The fourth edition of the show premiered on 5 January 2006 and was won by Chantelle Houghton, who ironically enough was the only housemate to not be a celebrity. The fifth series launched on 3 January 2007. This series saw Jade Goody, who had risen to fame after appearing on Big Brother 3, enter the house as a housemate. The fifth series became the most controversial series to date, when accusations of racism towards housemate Shilpa Shetty arose against Goody and other housemates. Shetty ultimately went on to win the series, while Goody was evicted after spending two weeks in the house. Following the controversy surrounding the fifth series, Celebrity Big Brother did not air in 2008. It did, however, return in 2009 and 2010, with the 2010 series being announced as the final one.

==== Channel 5 (2011–2018) ====
After Richard Desmond bought Channel 5 in 2010, he said he was keen to acquire both Big Brother and Celebrity Big Brother. Meanwhile, Endemol had been granted permission to keep the Big Brother House at the Elstree TV Studios until 30 September 2013. On 2 April 2011, The Daily Star, a newspaper owned by Desmond's Northern & Shell company, reported that Big Brother would be returning on Channel 5 in August 2011 with a Celebrity edition, followed by a main edition in September. Four days later, Channel 5 formally confirmed that it had signed a £200 million two-year contract with Endemol to screen Big Brother from 18 August 2011. Big Brother 2 winner Brian Dowling was announced as the new host. McCall declined the offer to host, having said goodbye to the show in 2010. Celebrity Big Brother 8 officially launched on 18 August 2011, and was won by Paddy Doherty. Beginning with the ninth series in 2012, two editions of Celebrity Big Brother were aired annually. The first series premiered in January, while the second premiered in the summer, either preceding or following the conclusion of the civilian series. Following the eleventh series, it was confirmed that Dowling had been axed as the host of both Big Brother and Celebrity Big Brother. Emma Willis was later revealed to be the new host of the show, and hosted from the twelfth until the twenty-second series, before the cancellation of Big Brother and Celebrity Big Brother on Channel 5 was announced on 14 September 2018.

==== ITV (2024–present) ====
In August 2022, ITV announced that they were reviving Big Brother in 2023. However, it was not initially confirmed as to whether they were planning to revive Celebrity Big Brother alongside it. In October 2023, the twentieth civilian series launched on ITV2 presented by AJ Odudu and Will Best, and several reports of a revival of Celebrity Big Brother began to circulate. In November 2023, during a live eviction episode of the civilian series, it was announced that Celebrity Big Brother would return on ITV in March 2024, presented by Odudu and Best. Unlike the civilian series, which is broadcast on ITV2, the celebrity series will air exclusively on ITV1 and STV. The show's spin off series Celebrity Big Brother: Late & Live will air on ITV2, with the Celebrity Big Brother: Live Stream airing daily on ITVX.

On 21 August 2025, ITV announced that Celebrity Big Brother would move from ITV1 to ITV2 for its twenty-fifth celebrity series and air in spring 2027.

=== Spin-offs ===
Celebrity Big Brother has been host to various spin-off series throughout the years. Most notably, Big Brother: Celebrity Hijack aired in 2008 following the racism controversy surrounding the fifth series. The series lasted for a total of 26 days, with John Loughton being crowned the winner on the final day. Despite the success of Celebrity Big Brother, the spin-off series provided poor ratings and was not renewed. Ultimate Big Brother was the final series to air on Channel 4, and featured fourteen of the most memorable housemates from both Big Brother and Celebrity Big Brother competing in the series. Numerous other spin-offs have occurred throughout the series such as Big Brother's Big Mouth, hosted by Russell Brand, and Big Brother's Little Brother hosted by Dermot O'Leary. Following the show's move to Channel 5, Big Brother's Bit on the Side was the only spin-off series. For ITV's revival, Late and Live will remain as the main spin-off series, hosted by AJ Odudu and Will Best, and continue airing on ITV2 and ITVX as with the civilian series.

== Format ==
(Celebrity) "Big Brother House, this is Davina. You are live on Channel 4; please do not swear. (nominated housemates' names), the lines are closed; the votes have been counted and verified, and I can now reveal that the nth person to be evicted from the (Celebrity) Big Brother House is...(evicted housemate's name). You have 30 seconds to say your goodbyes; I'm coming to get you!"

— McCall's speech when announcing the evicted housemate, which has been slightly altered by future hosts.

Big Brother is a game show in which a group of celebrity contestants, referred to as housemates, live in isolation from the outside world in a custom built "house", constantly under video surveillance. During their time in the House, the housemates are required to nominate two of their fellow contestants for potential eviction, and the two or more with the most votes would be nominated. This process is mandatory for all housemates, and failure to comply could result in expulsion from the House. During the show's broadcast on Channel 4, the viewers would vote to evict one of the nominated housemates, and the housemate with the most votes would be removed from the House. The third series, however, did see the viewers vote to save one of the celebrities. Series 8–12, which aired under Channel 5, saw the public voting to save a housemate, and the housemate with the fewest votes would be evicted. The voting process can be done via telephone or online. When the final week arrives, the viewers vote for which of the remaining celebrities should win the series, and the housemate with the most votes becomes the winner. Unlike the main series, the celebrities are competing for the charity of their choice. The third series was the only series to see the celebrities competing for a prize fund for themselves.

During their time in the House, housemates are given weekly tasks to perform. The housemates wager a portion of their weekly shopping budget on the task, and either win double their wagered fund or lose the wagered fund depending on their performance in the task. The housemates are required to work as a group to complete their tasks, with the format of the tasks varying based on the number of remaining housemates. Throughout the series, some housemates have been given secret tasks that must either be completed individually or with a small group; failure to do so can result in the housemate being nominated or punished in the House. Should the housemates run out of the food provided for them, an emergency ration was available to them. The housemates are forbidden from discussing nominations, and doing so could result in punishment. The format of the series is mainly seen as a social experiment, and requires housemates to interact with others who may have differing ideals, beliefs, and prejudices. Housemates are also required to make visits to the Diary Room during their stay in the House, where they are able to share their thoughts and feelings on their fellow housemates and the game.

== Series overview ==
Series	Days	Housemates	Winner	Runner-up	Episodes	Originally released			Average viewers (millions)
Series	Days	Housemates	Winner	Runner-up	Episodes	First released	Last released	Network	Average viewers (millions)
1	8	6	Jack Dee	Claire Sweeney	8	9 March 2001	16 March 2001	Channel 4, BBC One	5.2
2	10	6	Mark Owen	Les Dennis	12	20 November 2002	29 November 2002	Channel 4	4.36
3	18	9	Bez	Kenzie	18	6 January 2005	23 January 2005	Channel 4	4.22
4	23	11	Chantelle Houghton	Michael Barrymore	28	5 January 2006	27 January 2006	Channel 4	4.88
5	26	14	Shilpa Shetty	Jermaine Jackson	30	3 January 2007	28 January 2007	Channel 4	4.6
Hijack	26	12	John Loughton	Emilia Arata	28	3 January 2008	28 January 2008	E4	0.7
6	22	11	Ulrika Jonsson	Terry Christian	28	2 January 2009	29 January 2009	Channel 4	3.02
7	27	12	Alex Reid	Dane Bowers	32	3 January 2010	29 January 2010	Channel 4	3.34
8	22	10	Paddy Doherty	Kerry Katona	23	18 August 2011	8 September 2011	Channel 5	2.8
9	23	12	Denise Welch	Frankie Cocozza	25	5 January 2012	27 January 2012	Channel 5	2.6
10	24	13	Julian Clary	Coleen Nolan	26	15 August 2012	7 September 2012	Channel 5	2.2
11	23	11	Rylan Clark	Heidi Montag & Spencer Pratt	23	3 January 2013	25 January 2013	Channel 5	2.8
12	23	13	Charlotte Crosby	Abz Love	26	22 August 2013	13 September 2013	Channel 5	2.3
13	27	12	Jim Davidson	Dappy	27	3 January 2014	29 January 2014	Channel 5	3.1
14	26	14	Gary Busey	Audley Harrison	26	18 August 2014	12 September 2014	Channel 5	2.1
15	31	15	Katie Price	Katie Hopkins	32	7 January 2015	6 February 2015	Channel 5	3.1
16 (Note: Also known as Celebrity Big Brother: UK vs USA)	29	14	James Hill	Austin Armacost	29	27 August 2015	24 September 2015	Channel 5	1.9
17	32	16	Scotty T	Stephanie Davis	36	5 January 2016	5 February 2016	Channel 5	2.8
18	30	15	Stephen Bear	Ricky Norwood	33	28 July 2016	26 August 2016	Channel 5	2.1
19 (Note: Also known as Celebrity Big Brother: All-Stars vs. New Stars)	32	18	Coleen Nolan	Jedward	36	3 January 2017	3 February 2017	Channel 5	2.4
20	25	15	Sarah Harding	Amelia Lily	25	1 August 2017	25 August 2017	Channel 5	1.8
21 (Note: Also known as Celebrity Big Brother: Year of the Woman)	32	16	Shane Jenek/Courtney Act	Ann Widdecombe	37	2 January 2018	2 February 2018	Channel 5	1.9
22 (Note: Also known as Celebrity Big Brother: Eye of the Storm)	26	13	Ryan Thomas	Kirstie Alley	28	16 August 2018	10 September 2018	Channel 5	2.0
23	19	12	David Potts	Nikita Kuzmin	17	4 March 2024	22 March 2024	ITV1	2.50
24	19	13	Jack P. Shepherd	Danny Beard	17	7 April 2025	25 April 2025	ITV1	N/A

=== Timeline of hosts and narrator ===
Person	Series																									
Person	1	2	3	4	5	Hijack	6	7	8	9	10	11	12	13	14	15	16	17	18	19	20	21	22	23	24	25
Host
Davina McCall																										
Dermot O'Leary																										
Brian Dowling																										
Emma Willis																										
AJ Odudu																										
Will Best																										
Narrator
Marcus Bentley																										

== Sponsorships ==
=== Channel 4 (2001–2010) ===
Series	Sponsor	Slogan	Notes	Year(s)
1	Dubble Chocolate Bar	With added Comic Relief		2001
2	O2	Get connected		2002
3	TalkTalk	Get together		2005
4	Carphone Warehouse	Get star treatment	See note 1	2006
5	Carphone Warehouse	Get star treatment	See note 2	2007
Celebrity Hijack	Virgin Mobile	For a Happy House		2008
6	Dreams	Britain's leading bed specialist	See note 3	2009
7	Dreams	Everything for a great night's sleep		2010

=== Channel 5 (2011–2018) ===
Series	Sponsor	Slogan	Notes	Year(s)
8	Freederm	Well worth a closer look		2011
9	Plusnet	—N/a		2012
10	Schwarzkopf Live Color XXL	If you've got the attitude, we've got the colour		2012
11	Dreams	Britain's favourite bed specialist		2013
12	SuperCasino	Feel it for real	See note 4	2013
13	SuperCasino	Feel it for real	See note 4	2014
14	SuperCasino	—N/a	See note 4	2014
15	Gumtree	—N/a		2015
16	Lucozade Energy	—N/a		2015
17	—N/a	—N/a	See note 5	2016
18	Pink Casino	—N/a		2016
19	Pink Casino	—N/a		2017
20	Castle Jackpot	—N/a		2017
21	Pink Casino	—N/a		2018
22	Pink Casino	—N/a		2018

=== ITV (2024–present) ===
Series	Sponsor	Slogan	Notes	Year(s)
23	William Hill	…sponsors Celebrity Big Brother		2024
24	DUSK Furniture	…sponsors Celebrity Big Brother		2025

- ^1The Carphone Warehouse is the parent company of TalkTalk, the previous sponsor. It also had a deal of £2.5m-a-year to sponsor the Big Brother franchise
- ^2Due to the race row, the sponsorship was cut off halfway through the series
- ^3The cost of this sponsorship was £800,000
- ^4This sponsorship was only shown after 9.00 pm
- ^5Celebrity Big Brother 17 had no sponsorship, making it the first ever series of both Big Brother and Celebrity Big Brother not to have a sponsor.

== Controversy and criticism ==
Since its inception, Celebrity Big Brother has come under fire for reports of bullying, racism, and the physical and mental strain of appearing on the series.

== See also ==
- Big Brother franchise
- List of Celebrity Big Brother housemates
- Celebrity Big Brother (American TV series)
- The Surreal Life, a programme similar to Celebrity Big Brother in the United States, on which Traci Bingham, Caprice Bourret, Janice Dickinson, Brigitte Nielsen, Dennis Rodman and Verne Troyer have also appeared.
