= Celebrity Big Brother (British TV series) series 1 =

Coordinates: 51°31′39″N 0°0′11″W

Celebrity Big Brother
- Series 1
- Series one logo
- Presented by: Davina McCall
- No. of days: 8
- No. of housemates: 6
- Winner: Jack Dee
- Runner-up: Claire Sweeney
- Related show: Red Nose Day 2001
- No. of episodes: 8

Release
- Original network: Channel 4; BBC One
- Original release: 9 March – 16 March 2001

Series chronology
- Next → Series 2

Celebrity Big Brother 1, also referred to as Celebrity Big Brother 2001, is the first series of the British reality television show Celebrity Big Brother. The show is based on an originally Dutch TV series of the same name created by producer John de Mol Jr. in 1997. In honour of Comic Relief, six celebrities entered the Big Brother house.

The series premiered on 9 March 2001, and lasted for a total of eight days. It concluded on 16 March 2001 when comedian Jack Dee was crowned the winner. The series revolved around a group of celebrities living in a custom-built house with no contact with the outside world. Each week, the housemates are required to nominate two people for eviction. The two or more people with the most votes were nominated to leave the House. The viewers then decided which of the nominees should leave, with the selected person leaving during a live show. This process continued until only three housemates remained, at which time the public voted for which of them should win the series. Unlike the original show, Celebrity Big Brother saw the housemates competing for charity.

On 17 March 2023, a special twenty-second anniversary show aired as part of the 2023 Comic Relief event. The show titled When Comic Relief Did Big Brother was broadcast at 10pm on BBC Two. It featured interviews with five of the six housemates (Chris Eubank did not participate) with a look back on the series and their time in the house. Marcus Bentley narrated the episode.

== Format ==
Celebrity Big Brother is a game show in which a group of celebrity contestants, referred to as housemates, live in isolation from the outside world in a custom built "house", constantly under video surveillance. During their time in the House, the housemates are required to nominate two of their fellow contestants for potential eviction, and the two or more with the most votes would be nominated. This process is mandatory for all housemates, and failure to comply could result in expulsion from the House. The public then vote, with one of those celebrities evicted from the house. When the final week arrives, the viewers vote for which of the remaining celebrities should win the series, and the housemate with the most votes becomes the winner.

During their time in the House, housemates are given weekly tasks to perform. The housemates wager a portion of their weekly shopping budget on the task, and either win double their wagered fund or lose the wagered fund depending on their performance in the task. The housemates are required to work as a group to complete their tasks, with the format of the tasks varying based on the number of remaining housemates. Throughout the series, some housemates have been given secret tasks that must either be completed individually or with a small group; failure to do so can result in the housemate being nominated or punished in the House. Should the housemates run out of the food provided for them, an emergency ration was available to them. The housemates are forbidden from discussing nominations, and doing so could result in punishment. The format of the series is mainly seen as a social experiment, and requires housemates to interact with others who may have differing ideals, beliefs, and prejudices. Housemates are also required to make visits to the Diary Room during their stay in the House, where they are able to share their thoughts and feelings on their fellow housemates and the game.

== Housemates ==
Celebrity	Age on entry	Notability	Day entered	Day exited	Result
Jack Dee	39	Comedian	1	8	Winner
Claire Sweeney	29	Brookside actress	1	8	Runner-up
Keith Duffy	26	Boyzone member	1	8	3rd place
Anthea Turner	40	Former Blue Peter presenter	1	6	Evicted
Vanessa Feltz	39	TV presenter, broadcaster & journalist	1	4	Evicted
Chris Eubank	34	Professional boxer	1	2	Evicted

== Nominations table ==
	Day 1	Day 2	Day 4	Day 8 Final		Nominations received
Jack	Anthea, Chris	Vanessa, Anthea	Anthea, Keith	Winner (Day 8)		8
Claire	Anthea, Chris	Vanessa, Jack	Jack, Keith	Runner-up (Day 8)		2
Keith	Chris, Jack	Jack, Vanessa	Anthea, Claire	Third place (Day 8)		6
Anthea	Chris, Keith	Keith, Jack	Jack, Keith	Evicted (Day 6)		6
Vanessa	Chris, Jack	Keith, Jack	Evicted (Day 4)			3
Chris	Claire, Anthea	Evicted (Day 2)				5
Note	none			1		
Against public vote	Anthea, Chris	Jack, Vanessa	Anthea, Jack, Keith	Claire, Jack, Keith		
Evicted	Chris; 66% to evict	Vanessa; 71% to evict	Anthea; 52% to evict	Keith; 16% (out of 3)	Claire; 41% (out of 2)	
Evicted	Chris; 66% to evict	Vanessa; 71% to evict	Anthea; 52% to evict	Jack; 59% to win		

Notes

- ^1: The public were voting for the Housemate they wanted to win rather than to evict.

== Weekly summary ==
Day 1
Day 1	Entrances	Anthea, Chris, Claire, Jack, Keith and Vanessa entered the house.
Day 1	Nominations	Housemates nominated for the first time. Anthea and Chris received the most votes and faced the public vote.
Day 2
Day 2	Tasks	For their first task, the housemates had to customize a pair of pants for another fellow housemate. They then had to perform a fashion show with their creations. They passed the task and Big Brother played Westlife's Comic Relief song into the house.
Day 2	Exits	Chris was the first housemate evicted from the house after receiving 66% of the public vote to evict.
Day 2	Nominations	After Chris' eviction, the housemates nominated for a second time. Jack and Vanessa received the most votes and faced the public vote.
Day 3
Day 3	Tasks	The housemates were given their second task, in which each housemate had to memorize 10 facts about each other. They were then asked three questions at random later in the day. They passed and won a luxury shopping budget.
Day 4
Day 4	Tasks	The housemates were given their third task, in which they had to make a topiary model. They passed the task and won a film to watch
Day 4	Exits	Vanessa was the second housemate evicted from the house after receiving 71% of the public vote to evict.
Day 4	Nominations	After Vanessa's eviction, the housemates nominated for a second time. Anthea, Jack and Keith received the most votes and faced the public vote.
Day 5
Day 5	Tasks	The housemates were given their fourth task, in which they had to write an original song about their time in the house. They passed and won a takeaway dinner.
Day 6
Day 6	Tasks	The housemates were given their fifth task, in which they had to take part in an assault course. They passed and won a luxury shopping budget.
Day 6	Exits	Anthea was the third housemate evicted from the house after receiving 52% of the public vote to evict.
Day 7
Day 7	Tasks	Housemates were given their sixth task, in which they all had to take care of baby simulators called "Juanita" to test their parenting skills. They passed and won a Wild West themed party.
Day 8
Day 8	Tasks	Housemates were given their seventh and final task, in which they had to paint their favorite view of the house.
Day 8	Exits	Keith left the house in third place. Jack was announced as the winner, leaving Claire as the runner-up.

== Production ==
=== Broadcasts ===
The series premiered on 9 March 2001, on Channel 4. The contestants were recorded 24 hours a day with cameras fixed around the house, and had to wear portable microphones. Due to the tie-in with Comic Relief, the first series was partly broadcast on BBC One in the week leading up to the telethon. Channel 4 broadcast a daily 30-minute highlights show, and from the second day on there was a live eviction show hosted by Davina McCall, where the evicted housemate was interviewed. In the nightly highlight episodes, viewers are shown various highlights of a specific day in the house. BBC One's coverage consisted of a behind-the-scenes launch show hosted by McCall and 10-minute-long updates each day. Due to the length of the series, the psychologists featured in the main series did not return for Celebrity Big Brother 1, but did continue to appear in the main series. The series ended on 16 March (Red Nose Day) and the finale was broadcast live on both Channel 4 and BBC One as part of the evening's Comic Relief telethon. In total, the series lasted for a total of 8 days. Initially, Celebrity Big Brother was meant to be a one-time series, but due to the success it was later brought back as an annual event, airing while the main series was completed. Celebrity Big Brother 1 was the first season in the UK edition of Big Brother to feature a live premiere, something that would be used from Big Brother 3 onward.

=== Prizes ===
The six celebrities in the game are competing for charity, rather than a grand prize for themselves. While in the house, the housemates attempted to complete various tasks assigned by Big Brother in exchange for a grocery budget, which they used to buy food and luxuries; this included buying things such as alcohol and cigarettes. Celebrity Big Brother 1, much like the main series, did not feature luxury competitions or prizes throughout the season.

== House ==
For the first season, Celebrity Big Brother used the house that was used in Big Brother 1, which was located in Bow, London near the 3 Mills Studios. The House remained relatively unchanged from its appearance in the debut season. A living room was featured in the house, with blue walls lining it and the kitchen, which featured a stove and sink, along with the fridge. The house featured two nearly identical bedrooms, one for the men and one for the women. Each room featured five beds, with matching sheets and furniture. There was a shower room and toilet in the house as well. Housemates could communicate with producers in the room known as the "Diary Room". The Diary Room for the first season featured a simple design, being a small chair with a white background. Future seasons of the series would feature more elaborate Diary Rooms. The Diary Room was where nominations took place, and where housemates could reveal their thoughts. As seen in the third week, housemates could be seen by a medical professional in the Diary Room if necessary. The outside of the house featured a chicken coop with various chickens inside, from which the housemates collect eggs. Unlike other editions of the show, Big Brother 1 did not feature a swimming pool or hot tub for the housemates to use. There was also a garden in the backyard, which featured a vegetable patch which the housemates could use. Various two way mirrors are in the house, with a camera crew behind them. There are also various cameras and microphones throughout the house, providing the housemates with no privacy.

== Viewership ==
These viewing figures are taken from BARB.

Day	Viewers (millions)
Fri	4.58
Sat	4.01
Sun	4.41
Mon	4.93
Tue	6.11
Wed	6.60
Thu	5.69
Series average	5.2m
