= Big Brother (British TV series) series 21 =

Big Brother
- Series 21
- Series twenty-one logo
- Hosted by: AJ Odudu; Will Best
- No. of days: 41
- No. of housemates: 16
- Winner: Ali Bromley
- Runner-up: Marcello Dentamaro
- Companion show: Big Brother: Late & Live
- No. of episodes: 36

Release
- Original network: ITV2
- Original release: 6 October – 15 November 2024

Series chronology
- ← Previous; Series 20 Next → Series 22

Big Brother 2024, also known as Big Brother 21, is the twenty-first series of Big Brother. It was the second series of Big Brother to air on ITV2 after ITV plc gained the rights to the format, and the third series to air on the network overall. The series began on 6 October 2024 and was again co-presented by AJ Odudu and Will Best, who also returned to host the companion show, Big Brother: Late & Live.

The series concluded on 15 November 2024, when Ali Bromley was announced as the winner with Marcello Dentamaro finishing as the runner-up. At 41 days, this was the shortest-running civilian series of Big Brother in the UK, surpassing the previous series which ran for 42 days.

== Format ==
The series is set retained the same format from the previous series, running for 36 episodes and airing six nights a week from Sunday to Friday. Unlike the previous civilian series, the launch show was live, and as a result the series ran for 41 days, the shortest series in the show's history. ITV confirmed that the series would again feature a "new cast of carefully selected housemates, from all walks of life" [...] with "cameras capturing [the housemates'] every move, and the nation following every twist and turn." Shopping tasks, nominations and live evictions will return, with the public once again voting throughout the series and ultimately determining the winner, who will walk away with a cash prize. Hosts Odudu and Best also teased that the tasks for this series would be "taken up a notch".

== Housemates ==
On 6 October 2024, the day of launch show, the Big Brother social media accounts posted close-up teasers of the sixteen housemates' eyes several hours prior to the launch.

Name	Age on entry	Hometown	Day entered	Day exited	Result	Ref.
Ali Bromley	38	Leicester	1	41	Winner	
Marcello Spooks	34	East London	1	41	Runner-up	
Emma Morgan	53	Altrincham	1	41	3rd place	
Hanah Haji	24	Acton	1	41	4th place	
Nathan King	24	Sanquhar	1	41	5th place	
Segun Shodipo	25	Watford	1	41	6th place	
Thomas Atkinson	20	Carlisle	1	37	Evicted	
Sarah Griffiths	27	Bayston Hill	1	37	Evicted	
Rosie "Baked Potato" Williams	29	Calstock	1	36	Evicted	
Khaled Khaled	23	Manchester (originally from Lebanon)	1	34	Evicted	
Lily Benson	20	Warrington	1	34	Evicted	
Dean Quinton	35	Walthamstow	1	27	Evicted	
Martha Jones	26	Scarborough	1	24	Evicted	
Izaaz Miah	29	Swansea	1	20	Evicted	
Adaeze "Daze" Aghaji	24	Limehouse Basin	1	13	Evicted	
Ryan Bradshaw	28	Blackpool	1	6	Evicted	

== Head of House ==
Starting in Week 2, the Head of House was introduced. Each week, the housemates competed in the Head of House competition. The winner of the competition would be the Head of House for the week. The Head of House would be immune from eviction, be able to influence nominations, and sleep in a special bed. Each week after the nominations, the Head of House would have the opportunity to use either a Killer Nomination Power, or a Save and Replace Power. The Killer Nomination Power would automatically put one housemate up for eviction. While the Save and Replace Power would save one nominated housemate, and replace them with another housemate. The housemates could only win Head of House once during the series.

Week	Head of House	Head of House Power
Week 2	Khaled	Killer Nominate Martha
Week 3	Ali and Dean	Save Hanah and Lily, replace them with Khaled and Marcello
Week 4	Emma	Nominate Ali, Khaled, Martha and Thomas for an instant eviction
Week 4	Emma	Save Nathan, replace him with Dean
Week 5	Marcello	Save Thomas, replace him with Baked Potato

== Nominations table ==
	Week 1	Week 2	Week 3	Week 4		Week 5	Week 6 Final		Nominations received
	Week 1	Week 2	Week 3	Day 23	Day 26	Week 5	Week 6 Final		Nominations received
Ali	Housemate	Sarah, Segun	Khaled & Marcello, Khaled & Marcello	Not eligible	Marcello, Hanah	Sarah, Emma	Winner (Day 41)		10
Marcello	Housemate	Ali, Daze	Izaaz & Nathan	Not eligible	Not eligible	Ali, Lily, Baked Potato	Runner-up (Day 41)		3
Emma	Housemate	Izaaz, Lily	Hanah & Lily	Martha, Thomas, Khaled, Ali	Dean, Hanah, Dean	Lily, Ali	Third place (Day 41)		4
Hanah	Housemate	Ali, Lily	Izaaz & Nathan	Not eligible	Not eligible	Emma, Ali	Fourth place (Day 41)		5
Nathan	Non- Housemate	Sarah, Izaaz	Hanah & Lily	Not eligible	Not eligible	Banned	Fifth place (Day 41)		8
Segun	Housemate	Daze, Lily	Izaaz & Nathan	Not eligible	Nathan, Lily	Lily, Ali	Sixth place (Day 41)		3
Thomas	Housemate	Daze, Lily	Hanah & Lily	Not eligible	Lily, Baked Potato	Emma, Lily	Evicted (Day 37)		4
Sarah	Housemate	Ali, Nathan	Hanah & Lily	Not eligible	Not eligible	Lily, Khaled	Evicted (Day 37)		5
Rosie Baked Potato	Non- Housemate	Thomas, Ali	Hanah & Lily	Not eligible	Not eligible	Khaled, Thomas	Evicted (Day 36)		1
Khaled	Housemate	Lily, Ali, Martha	Izaaz & Nathan	Not eligible	Lily, Nathan	Lily, Nathan	Evicted (Day 34)		5
Lily	Housemate	Emma, Segun	Izaaz & Nathan	Not eligible	Not eligible	Thomas, Khaled	Evicted (Day 34)		18
Dean	Non- Housemate	Sarah, Daze	Khaled & Marcello, Khaled & Marcello	Not eligible	Marcello, Sarah	Evicted (Day 27)			2
Martha	Housemate	Segun, Nathan	Izaaz & Nathan	Not eligible	Evicted (Day 24)				2
Izaaz	Housemate	Lily, Daze	Hanah & Lily	Evicted (Day 20)					6
Daze	Housemate	Izaaz, Dean	Evicted (Day 13)						5
Ryan	Non- Housemate	Evicted (Day 6)							N/A
Notes	1	none	2	3	4	5	6, 7		
Against public vote	Baked Potato, Dean, Nathan, Ryan	Ali, Daze, Lily, Martha	~~Hanah~~, Izaaz, Khaled, ~~Lily~~, Marcello, Nathan	Ali, Khaled, Martha, Thomas	Dean, Hanah, Lily, Marcello, ~~Nathan~~	Ali, Baked Potato, Emma, Khaled, Lily, ~~Thomas~~	Ali, Baked Potato, Emma, Hanah, Marcello, Nathan, Sarah, Segun, Thomas		
Evicted	Ryan; Most votes to evict	Daze; Most votes to evict	Izaaz; Most votes to evict	Martha; Most votes to evict	Dean; Most votes to evict	Lily; Most votes to evict	Baked Potato; 0.33% (out of 3)	Nathan; 3.67% (out of 6)	
Evicted	Ryan; Most votes to evict	Daze; Most votes to evict	Izaaz; Most votes to evict	Martha; Most votes to evict	Dean; Most votes to evict	Lily; Most votes to evict	Sarah; 0.45% (out of 8)	Hanah; 8.3% (out of 4)	
Evicted	Ryan; Most votes to evict	Daze; Most votes to evict	Izaaz; Most votes to evict	Martha; Most votes to evict	Dean; Most votes to evict	Lily; Most votes to evict	Thomas; 0.59% (out of 8)	Emma; 12.12% (out of 3)	
Evicted	Ryan; Most votes to evict	Daze; Most votes to evict	Izaaz; Most votes to evict	Martha; Most votes to evict	Dean; Most votes to evict	Khaled; Most votes to evict			
Evicted	Ryan; Most votes to evict	Daze; Most votes to evict	Izaaz; Most votes to evict	Martha; Most votes to evict	Dean; Most votes to evict	Khaled; Most votes to evict	Segun; 2.41% (out of 6)	Marcello; 20.28% (out of 2)	
Evicted	Ryan; Most votes to evict	Daze; Most votes to evict	Izaaz; Most votes to evict	Martha; Most votes to evict	Dean; Most votes to evict	Khaled; Most votes to evict	Ali; 51.85% to win		

Notes

- ^Note 1: On Day 1, the housemates had to choose whether to stand on the red side or the blue side, and that whichever side they chose would have consequences. After all housemates had entered, they were told that the one side would be housemates, whilst the other side would be "non-housemates" and would ultimately be sent into storage. The blue side were revealed as housemates, whilst the red side were non-housemate. Once in storage, both sides of the house were informed that they would compete in battles with members of the opposing side in order to switch places and gain housemate status, with those left in storage facing the public vote. On Day 2, Martha won the first battle against Ryan, ultimately gaining housemate status and chose Hanah and Rosie to move into the main house with her. Ryan was sent to storage. Segun won the second battle against Daze, and remained a housemate. Thomas won the third battle against Rosie, with the former gaining housemate status and chose Marcello and Sarah to move with him, whilst the latter moved back to storage. Daze won the final battle of endurance to secure housemate status, and chose Emma and Lily to join the house with her, leaving Baked Potato, Dean, Nathan and Ryan to face the first public vote.
- ^Note 2: For this week, there were two "Heads of House". Additionally, the housemates nominated in pairs, which had been chosen by "Heads of House" Ali and Dean. The pairs were Hanah and Lily, Marcello and Khaled, Izaaz and Nathan, Martha and Segun, Sarah and Baked Potato, and Emma and Thomas.
- ^Note 3: On Day 23, as "Head of House", Emma was given sole responsibility of deciding which housemates would face an instant eviction. She chose Martha, Thomas, Khaled and Ali.
- ^Note 4: For this week's shopping task, housemates were divided into two teams, the "Vampires" and the "Villagers". The winning team received a luxury shopping budget and the ability to nominate, whereas the losing team received basic rations and were unable to nominate.
- ^Note 5: On Day 28, as punishment for discussing nominations, Nathan was ineligible to become "Head of House" and was banned from nominating this week.
- ^Note 6: On Day 34, the voting lines opened for the public to vote for the winner. On Day 36, voting was frozen and later that day, the housemate who selected the gold envelope; Segun, subsequently had to choose three housemates to enter "The Vault" alongside him; Ali, Baked Potato and Nathan. Of the three housemates chosen, Baked Potato, who received the fewest votes to win, was evicted via the back door. On Day 37, the vote to win re-opened and the two housemates with the fewest votes, Sarah and Thomas; entered "The Vault" and were evicted via the back door.
- ^Note 7: The voting percentages reflect the overall share of the vote when the lines closed for good, and do not account for intermittent voting freezes throughout the final week. Ali won with 71.88% of the votes between her and Marcello.

== Weekly summary ==
The main events in the Big Brother 21 house are summarised in the table below.

Week 1	Entrances	On Day 1, Rosie, Emma, Segun, Nathan, Daze, Khaled, Martha, Lily, Ali, Thomas, Ryan, Hanah, Izaaz, Sarah, Marcello and Dean entered the house.
Week 1	Twists	On Day 1, upon the first six housemates entering the house, they were told they would have to stand on either the red side or the blue side, and that whichever side they chose would have consequences at the end of the night. Emma, Nathan and Daze chose the red side, whilst Rosie, Segun and Khaled opted for the blue side. Martha and Lily subsequently chose the red side, whilst Ali opted for the blue side. Thomas chose the red side. Hanah was told upon her entrance that after picking a side, she would be able to choose another housemate from the opposing side to join her. She chose the red side, and brought Rosie over also. Izaaz chose the blue side, whilst Sarah, Marcello and Dean chose the red side. After all of the housemates entered, they were told that the one side would be housemates, whilst the other side would be "non-housemates" and would ultimately be sent into storage. The blue side were revealed as housemates, whilst the red side were non-housemates. Once in storage, both sides of the house were informed that they would compete in battles with members of the opposing side in order to switch places and gain housemate status. Those left in storage would face the public vote. Following the battles, Baked Potato, Dean, Nathan and Ryan failed to gain housemate status and therefore faced the public vote.
Week 1	Tasks	On Day 2, the non-housemates in storage were told that they would have to decide amongst them who would compete in the first battle. They chose Martha, who in turn had to decide which housemate from the opposing side she would compete against in a game of strategy. She selected Ryan. They had to sit in a room in which a cake exploded in front of them and they subsequently had to convince Ali, who had been chosen by the housemates as the best judge of character, that they were not responsible. Ali decided that Martha was telling the truth, who earned housemate status and was able to choose two housemates to join her in the house. She chose Hanah and Rosie. Meanwhile, Ryan was sent to storage. Later that day, the second battle commenced in which the non-housemates had to decide which housemate would compete in a challenge where they would have to be the "most loveable". They chose Daze, who in turn chose to battle against Segun who she thought was the "most unlovable". The task featured a dog who was placed in the centre of the garden and whoever the dog went to first would win. The dog went to Segun who maintained housemate status. The next battle was to determine who was the most competitive. Thomas was chosen by the non-housemates, who chose to compete against Rosie, determining her as the least competitive housemate. This battle was a game of dares. Taking it in turns, they had to turn over a card a complete a dare. Thomas agreed to place a bucket on his head, wear a stench scarf and shave off one of his eyebrows, whilst Rosie was dared to change her name by deed poll to "Baked Potato", eat liquidised food until further notice, and smash chewing gum in her hair. Thomas' final dare was to shred three of his housemates' personal photos, which he accepted and chose to shred Daze, Marcello and Ryan's letters. Rosie refused her final dare of having to make all her nominations public for the remainder of the series. Therefore Thomas gained housemate status and chose Marcello and Sarah to join him, whilst Baked Potato returned to storage. The final opportunity for non-housemates to gain housemate status was an endurance competition in which they had to keep their arm raised above their head for longest. Daze won the competition, earning housemate status and ultimately chose Lily and Emma to join her also. As a result of her decision, Baked Potato, Dean, Nathan and Ryan failed to gain housemate status and were remained up for eviction.; On Day 4, the housemates took part in their first shopping task. The house was transformed in to a holiday resort "Coconut Eye Land". Dean was appointed resort manager, whilst Hanah, Khaled, Lily, Marcello and Sarah took on the role of staff. The staff had to decide which of the remaining housemates would receive an "all-inclusive wristband" and which housemates would receive a "half board wristband". Ali, Baked Potato, Martha, Segun and Thomas received the former, whilst Daze, Emma, Izaaz, Nathan and Ryan received the latter. In order to pass the shopping task, the staff had to remain polite at all times in order to maintain the resorts' 5 star rating, whilst guests were only able consume food and drink that had been prepared for their particular guest ranking. Housemates could incur no more than 5 fails. During the task, Dean was informed by Big Brother of a secret mission, in which Hanah would have to get one of the guests to complain. She was successful in doing so, as Ryan made a complaint. The housemates incurred a total of 51 fails throughout the duration of the task, which included staff member Marcello eating watermelon from the "all-inclusive" buffet, Ryan eating two sausages from the "all-inclusive" buffet despite having a "half-board" wristband, staff member Sarah insulting guests during the aqua aerobics class, and staff member Lily eating a sausage from the "all-inclusive" buffet, sitting on the laps of guests and falling asleep during her shift. They therefore failed the shopping task and ultimately received an economy shopping budget.; On Day 5, housemates took part in "The Circuit", in which housemates had to figure out the "common connections" between each other. On each podium listed a different interest, experience or opinion that at least two housemates had shared with Big Brother prior to entering the house. After correctly completing the circuit, housemates were rewarded with a Chinese takeaway voucher. However due to housemates failing the shopping task, only five housemates would receive the voucher and they had to collectively decide amongst them who would receive the reward. They chose Hanah, Khaled, Lily, Marcello and Sarah.
Week 1	Exits	On Day 6, Ryan became the first housemate to be evicted.
Week 2	Nominations	On Day 8, housemates nominated for the first time. Ali, Daze and Lily received the most nominations and therefore faced the public vote, alongside Martha who had received a killer nomination from "Head of House" Khaled.
Week 2	Punishments	On Day 6, as punishment for discussing nominations, Daze and Lily were chained to the staircase until further notice.; On Day 7, as punishment for Ali, Baked Potato, Emma and Nathan discussing and speculating about nominations, the hot water and electrical appliances were switched off for the whole house.; On Day 9, as punishment for discussing and speculating about nominations, Lily and Martha were sent to jail in the garden. The hot water and electrical appliances were also switched off again.; On Day 12, as punishment for housemates attempting to communicate in code by writing messages on the wall of the smoking area, Big Brother halved the luxury shopping budget, and as a result confiscated the tea and coffee, biscuits, sweets, as well as 140 packets of crisps.
Week 2	Twists	On Day 7, Big Brother introduced the "Head of House" competition, in which housemates would compete for luxuries, power and immunity from eviction.; On Day 8, as "Head of House", Khaled was given the opportunity to influence nominations and was able to pick from two options, either "Save and Replace", saving one of the nominees and replacing them with another housemate of his choice, or "Killer Nomination", leaving nominations the same and choosing one housemate to automatically face the public vote. He chose the latter and ultimately chose to nominate Martha.
Week 2	Tasks	On Day 7, housemates took part in the first "Head of House" competition of the series, titled "Murder on the Dancefloor", in which they had to dance until the music stopped, before stepping on a circle with a certain number on, which determined how many people could stand on said circle. Izaaz and Khaled were the final two housemates standing, after which each housemate was asked to line-up behind the housemate they wanted to become "Head of House". Ali, Hanah, Lily, Martha, Rosie and Sarah chose the former, whilst Daze, Dean, Emma, Marcello, Nathan, Segun and Thomas chose the latter, meaning with 7 votes, Khaled became the first "Head of House" of the series.; On Day 9, housemates took part in a task where they were given a character statement and had to decide out of two housemates chosen at random, who the statement related to best. Meanwhile, "Head of House" Khaled and Segun were in the diary room, and had to correctly predict which housemate the majority had chosen. They successfully passed the task with 4 out of 7 guesses correct, and as a result, the hot water and electrical appliances were switched back on.; On Day 10, housemates began their next shopping task. The house was transformed into Downing Street and a government was formed consisting of "Head of House" Khaled, who took on the role of Prime Minister, whilst Daze, Emma and Nathan were appointed ministers. The government were given a budget of £100,000,000, and had the opportunity to spend this money on necessities that would make the tasks easier. The first task saw Ali, Baked Potato, Dean, Lily and Marcello take on the role of road workers who had to fix the roads by filling in potholes. The government chose not to spend any of the budget on better tools or more time for the workers, however they successfully completed the road and passed this The second task was completed by Martha, who had to blow continuously on windmills to generate 20 minutes worth of clean energy. The government opted to spend £10,000,000 of the budget to ensure she had 10 minutes extra time, meaning she had 40 minutes to complete the task instead of 30, and was ultimately successful in doing so. For the next task, the government had to choose two citizens to act as police officers to guard Downing Street overnight. They chose Izaaz and Thomas, and ultimately decided not to spend £20,000,000 on an extra police officer, which would have enabled them to rotate shifts. The officers remained stationed outside Downing Street overnight and therefore passed this part of the task. On Day 11, the government were asked whether or not they wanted to spend £30,000,000 of the budget in order for the hot water to be switched back on. They decided to decline the offer. For the next part of the task, Big Brother hosted a radio show in which the government were asked questions by Big Brother, before taking phone calls from the citizens who in turn had the chance to respond to the government's answers. Big Brother was satisfied that the government did not dodge any questions and they therefore passed this part of the task. For the final part of the shopping task, to combat the nation's butter shortage, housemates had 30 minutes to milk a cow, churn the milk into butter, and then pack eight blocks of butter ready for sale. Hanah and Sarah were chosen by default to compete in the task, Big Brother then gave the government the option to pay for up to three extra workers to take part in the task, at a cost of £20,000,000 per worker. They could choose from Izaaz, Segun and Thomas and decided to pay for all three of them to take part. The housemates were successful in completing the final task, and Big Brother subsequently announced that they had passed this week's shopping task and would therefore receive a luxury shopping budget. The hot water and electrical appliances were also switched back on as a result.; On Day 12, housemates competed in "Alphabet Soup" in which they each had to wear a letter of the alphabet and spell out a word within an allotted time. They were successful and won an alphabet themed disco for that evening.
Week 2	Exits	On Day 13, Daze became the second housemate to be evicted.
Week 3	Nominations	On Day 15, housemates nominated in pairs as chosen by "Heads of House" Ali and Dean. Each pair was required to nominate one other pair for eviction. Hanah and Lily, and Izaaz and Nathan received the most nominations. However, Hanah and Lily were subsequently saved from eviction by the "Heads of House" and were replaced by Khaled and Marcello, who ultimately faced the public vote alongside Izaaz and Nathan. Despite nominating in pairs, housemates were told that they would face eviction as individuals.
Week 3	Punishments	On Day 16, as a result of multiple rule breaks regarding the discussions of nominations, which included conversations between Ali and Nathan, as well as Khaled, Hanah and Segun, housemates were stripped of their luxury shopping budget and could only eat porridge until further notice.
Week 3	Twists	On Day 14, "Heads of House" Ali and Dean were informed by Big Brother that housemates would be nominating in pairs and were instructed to choose the pairings. They paired Hanah and Lily, Marcello and Khaled, Izaaz and Nathan, Martha and Segun, Sarah and Baked Potato, and Emma and Thomas.; On Day 15, as "Heads of House", Ali and Dean were given the opportunity to influence nominations and were able to pick from two options, either "Save and Replace", saving a pair of nominees and replacing them with another pair of their choice, or "Killer Nomination", leaving nominations the same and choosing one pair to automatically face the public vote. They decided to save Hanah and Lily, before choosing Khaled and Marcello to take their place and therefore face eviction.
Week 3	Tasks	On Day 14, housemates embarked on the next "Head of House" competition. One at a time, housemates would enter a room and smash the portrait of the housemate that they did not want to become the next "Head of House". They would then select the next housemate to enter the room. As outgoing "Head of House", Khaled entered the room first and chose to smash Lily's portrait, Segun smashed Izaaz's portrait, Martha smashed Baked Potato's portrait, Emma smashed Khaled's portrait, Thomas smashed Sarah's portrait, Izaaz smashed Nathan's portrait, Ali smashed Marcello's portrait, Hanah smashed Martha's portrait, Lily smashed Emma's portrait, Baked Potato smashed Segun's portrait, Dean smashed Hanah's portrait and Nathan smashed Thomas' portrait. Ali and Dean's portraits were left intact, therefore they became joint "Heads of House" and as a result both won immunity for the week.; On Day 17, housemates embarked on their next shopping task, in which the house was transformed into the "R.A.T (Rodent Assessment Testing) Lab". For this task, "Heads of House" Ali and Dean took on the roles of science professors whilst Hanah and Lily served as their lab interns. The remaining housemates became "lab rats" and were situated inside cages in the living area. To pass the task, the scientists had to correctly guess the outcome of several experiments undertaken by the lab rats. The first experiment was a test to see whether the lab rats would work better under pressure, which the scientists predicted they would. Baked Potato and Sarah competed in a "high pressured" environment in which the interns would hurl insults and give them electric shocks if they made an error, whilst Izaaz and Nathan took on the task in a "calm" environment and were given encouragement and praise from the professors. The latter pair completed the task first, meaning scientists incorrectly predicted the outcome of the experiment and they therefore failed this part of the task. For the next experiment, the scientists had to predict whether or not the lab rats could resist temptation. Emma and Thomas were called to the diary room and were faced with a variety of sweet treats, whilst Khaled and Marcello were offered fried chicken and chips. Both pairs were asked if they wanted to partake in eating the food, however were warned that it would come at a cost to their fellow lab rats. They all resisted temptation, and as a result the scientists' prediction was correct and they passed this part of the task. For the final experiment, the scientists had to predict which sex had the better intuition, male or female. Martha and Segun took part in this task, and were faced with testing stations containing the same objects, however one would be good and one would be bad. For the first choice, Segun selected the "good" doughnut, whilst Martha selected the "bad" doughnut which contained spicy sauce. The second choice saw Martha choose an envelope containing the words "good egg" and was able to eat a chocolate egg, whilst Segun chose the envelope containing "bad egg" and had to crack an egg on his head. For the final choice, they each had to select a bin, which in turn was poured over them by the professors. Martha chose the correct bin and had confetti poured over her, whilst Segun chose the bin containing "bin juice" which in turn was poured over him. Martha chose the majority of "good" objects and was therefore deemed to have the best intuition. As the scientists had predicted that women had better intuition, they passed the final part of the task. At the end of the shopping task, Big Brother announced that the scientists had correctly predicted the outcome of 2 out of 3 experiments correctly. As a result, housemates passed this week's shopping task and therefore received a luxury shopping budget.; On Day 18, Baked Potato and Sarah were set a secret mission by Big Brother in which they had to start a rumour that Nathan was a multi-millionaire who owned a super yacht. To pass the mission, they had to tell one housemate who in turn would have to spread the rumour to at least half of the house. As several housemates suspected they were on a secret mission, Baked Potato and Sarah failed and therefore did not win a reward for the house.; On Day 19, housemates played a game in which they had to either answer a "spicy question" about their fellow housemates or take a shot of hot sauce as a forfeit.
Week 3	Exits	On Day 20, Izaaz became the third housemate to be evicted.
Week 4	Nominations	On Day 23, "Head of House" Emma nominated Ali, Khaled, Martha and Thomas for eviction, who subsequently faced a flash public vote.; On Day 26, following the result of this week's shopping task, only the winning team, "The Vampires", consisting of Ali, Dean, Emma, Khaled, Segun and Thomas, had the ability to nominate. They were also required to nominate face-to-face. Lily, Hanah, Marcello and Nathan received the most nominations. However "Head of House" Emma subsequently decided to save Nathan from eviction, and replaced him with Dean, who ultimately faced the public vote.
Week 4	Twists	On Day 23, "Head of House" Emma was told that as part of "Hallo-Week", her reign would be "evil" and that she would be solely responsible for deciding which housemates faced eviction. She chose Ali, Khaled, Martha and Thomas.; On Day 26, as "Head of House", Emma was given the opportunity to influence nominations and was able to pick from two options, either "Save and Replace", saving one of the nominees and replacing them with another housemate of her choice, or "Killer Nomination", leaving nominations the same and choosing one housemate to automatically face the public vote. She chose the former and opted to save Nathan, before ultimately replacing him with Dean.
Week 4	Tasks	On Day 21, Segun was called to the diary room whilst all other housemates were gathered at the sofas. They were informed by Big Brother that various events would occur throughout the day and that they would have to ensure Segun remained oblivious to them. The first of which was housemates having to pop all the balloons in the living area before Segun left the diary room. For the next task, they had to get David Potts who was dressed as a plant pot in the garden, into the diary room without Segun noticing. Marcello was then tasked with keeping a giant chicken on his person until the oven timer went off, before ten housemates had to partake in a rave inside the bathroom for ten minutes. Segun remained oblivious throughout and housemates therefore passed the task. They were rewarded with Segun's favourite food, apple and blackberry crumbles as a reward.; On Day 22, at various points throughout the day, the house phone would ring and housemates would have to complete the call by responding to tasks set by Big Brother. Sarah answered the first call and was given 15 minutes to give a makeover to the housemate of her choice. She chose Marcello. Martha answered the phone next and was informed that there had been a mix up with the shopping list, and was asked to bring several listed items to the diary room which included sweets, tea bags and jars of coffee. However this transpired to be a "scam call" and the housemates therefore lost said items from the shopping. Baked Potato was next to answer the phone and was told she had won a prize, however to do so, had to confirm her name. She was unsuccessful as the automated call did not recognise her name and she therefore did not win a prize. For the next part of the task, the housemates played the giveaway game "Clues for Booze", in which a housemate was given either a question via the phone, and they had to pass the phone to the housemate they thought the question was about. The final phone calls of the day were calls from Dean and Ali's partners, which were answered by Sarah and Lily respectively.; On Day 23, the house was transformed into "Camp Big Brother" which saw the beginning of "Hallo-Week" and a new competition to become "Head of House". The housemates were dressed as "cheerleaders" and "jocks" and had to compete in a number of challenges with housemates being eliminated each round until a new "Head of House" was determined. The housemates were gathered in the living area, where they would have to read from the "Story of Camp Big Brother" and fill in the blanks with a housemate name, who in turn would have to complete the action listed in the book. The book was then passed on to another housemate who would do the same. The final sentence from the story read out by Nathan saw him have to choose the housemate who he thought was least worthy of becoming "Head of House"; he chose Martha who was eliminated from the competition. For the next part of the task, Big Brother announced that six protective amulets were hidden around the house, and that those who found them would be protected from becoming the next eliminated from the competition. The amulets were found by Sarah, Lily, Marcello, Segun, Emma and Baked Potato respectively. Those who found amulets then had to collectively decide which two remaining housemates would progress alongside them. They chose Nathan and Thomas, meaning Ali, Dean, Hanah and Khaled were eliminated from the competition. Later that day, "Claire the Crow" in the garden began secretly conversing with Baked Potato and Dean in the garden, however they were told that the crow could only speak to one of them, which was ultimately Dean. The crow told Dean that he would be responsible for eliminating the next two housemates from the competition; he chose to eliminate Marcello and Segun. For the final part of the competition, the remaining housemates; Baked Potato, Emma, Lily, Nathan, Sarah and Thomas were each given a torch at random, and were informed that only one of the torches would work and that it would determine the winner. Emma's torch lit up and she therefore became the new "Head of House".; On Day 24, housemates took part in the "Trick or Treat" game, in which four housemates at a time would stand inside gallows in the garden in different positions chosen by "Head of House" Emma, who would give housemates either a "trick" or a "treat". Housemates had to decide whether to trust the position Emma had placed them in, or swap with another housemate. Baked Potato, Dean, Lily and Nathan faced the first "trick or treat" decision, with Lily receiving a trick and being gunged. The next housemates to step up were Hanah, Marcello, Segun and Sarah. Segun opted to swap positions with Marcello, the latter of whom was gunged. The final part of the task saw Ali, Khaled, Martha and Thomas take to the gallows, who unbeknownst to them, had been nominated for eviction by "Head of House" Emma. They were then informed that the public had been voting and that the housemate with the most votes would be evicted. Khaled, Ali and Thomas were announced as safe respectively, whilst Martha was gunged and became the next housemate to be evicted.; On Day 25, housemates were split into two teams for the next shopping task, the "Vampires" and the "Villagers". For this week's task, the aim was for each team to collect more blood than their rivals, and the winning team would receive a luxury shopping budget, whilst the losing team would receive basic rations. In addition to this, only the winning team would be able to nominate. As "Head of House" Emma was appointed leader of the "Vampires" team by default, and selected Ali, Dean, Khaled, Segun and Thomas to join her. Meanwhile, Baked Potato, Hanah, Lily, Marcello, Nathan, Sarah formed the "Villagers" team. The "Vampires" had to reside in their lair during the day and could only enter other areas of the house with permission from the "Villagers". For the first part of the task, Ali, representing the "Vampires" and Sarah, representing the "Villagers", entered Big Brother's dungeon and went head to head in a competition in which they had to suck the blood from corpses and transfer it into a vial with their team's name on. Sarah collected the most blood for the "Villagers" and won this part of the task. For the next part of the task, Dean for the "Vampires", and Nathan for the "Villagers" were faced with "Big Brother's Bad Blood Board" where they were faced with questions about their fellow housemates, and in order for the blood to flow from the board so they could collect in their vial, they had to "spill the bad blood" about their housemates and answer the question to Big Brother's satisfaction before they place a stake through a heart on the board. Dean collected the most blood, leading the "Vampires" to win this part of the task. For the final part of the task, Baked Potato and Segun entered the dungeon and had to stand whilst balancing a pole on their back which held receptacles containing the blood already collected by their respective teams. During the task, the lights were turned out and they were confronted by scary creatures with their aim being not to spill any of the blood or else it would be lost. They both managed to maintain composure and did not spill any blood. As the task concluded, the "Vampires" managed to collect the most blood and therefore received a luxury shopping budget and the right to nominate, whilst the "Villagers" were forced to live off basic rations and were unable to nominate this week.
Week 4	Exits	On Day 24, Martha became the fourth housemate to be evicted, via the back door.; On Day 27, Dean became the fifth housemate to be evicted.
Week 5	Nominations	On Day 31, housemates nominated again. Ali, Emma, Khaled, Lily and Thomas received the most nominations. However, Thomas was subsequently saved from eviction by the "Head of House" Marcello, and was replaced by Baked Potato, who ultimately faced the public vote.
Week 5	Punishments	On Day 28, due to several housemates from the losing team of this week's shopping task consuming food and drink from the luxury shopping budget, meant only for the winning team, the whole house were resorted to basic rations.; On Day 28, as punishment for discussing nominations, Nathan became ineligible to become "Head of House" and was subsequently banned from nominating this week.; On Day 33, as punishment for discussing nominations, Lily was prohibited from adding any items to the luxury shopping list.
Week 5	Twists	On Day 30, outgoing "Head of House" Emma was asked to gather the remaining previous "Heads of House" Khaled and Ali to convene in the secret basement, where they were told that they would each be able to choose one other housemate to put forward to become the final "Head of House". Ali chose Lily, Khaled chose Marcello, and Emma chose Sarah. Lily, Marcello and Sarah's photos were subsequently placed on a Catherine wheel in a garden which would decide the winner. The wheel landed on Marcello, who ultimately became the final "Head of House" of the series.; On Day 31, as "Head of House", Marcello was given the opportunity to influence nominations and was able to pick from two options, either "Save and Replace", saving one of the nominees and replacing them with another housemate of his choice, or "Killer Nomination", leaving nominations the same and choosing one housemate to automatically face the public vote. He ultimately chose to "Save and Replace", and opted to save Thomas from eviction, before replacing him with Baked Potato.
Week 5	Tasks	On Day 29, housemates took part in "Big Brother Nature's Flower Show" in which "Head of House" Emma was appointed the role of "Head Gardener" and chose Baked Potato as her groundskeeper. For this task, they had to categorise the other housemates by assigning them as different plants based on their behaviour in the house. Khaled and Lily were chosen as the "Weeds" and had to sit on the compost heap in the garden and spend time writing a self improvement speech, Ali and Marcello were appointed the "Wallflowers" and had to create and perform a dance routine, Hanah and Nathan were chosen as the "Stinging Nettles" and had to be nice to their fellow housemates and give them compliments before apologising for their past actions, Segun and Thomas were the "Ivy" and had to sit on the fence in the garden and were only able to get off if they delivered a critical opinion about another housemate. Sarah was chosen as the "Rose" and had to advise the other housemates on how to improve and become more like her. At the end of the task, after the plants had showcased their performances, Emma and Baked Potato had to decide which pair had shown the "most growth". They chose Ali and Marcello, who were given the title "Best in Show" and were subsequently awarded with a tea party in the greenhouse alongside the head gardener and groundskeeper.; On Day 32, housemates began their final shopping task in which the house was transformed into a "criminal underworld". Housemates were segregated into three rival crews, "The Biker Bandits" consisting of Ali, Hanah and Nathan, "The Moustache Mob" which was made up of Emma, Thomas and Segun, and "The Grifter Geezers" which featured Baked Potato, Khaled and Sarah. Meanwhile "Head of House" Marcello was appointed the "Big Boss", whilst Lily was given the role of his "right-hand woman". The housemates were informed that one of the crews would become "saboteurs" and that they would only win the shopping task if they were correctly identified by Marcello and Lily. However, this was a lie and unbeknownst to the other housemates "The Biker Bandits" were told that as the saboteurs, they would have to remain undetected during a series of heists in the museum in order to pass the task. The first heist was undertaken by Baked Potato, Nathan and Segun who had to surpass laser beams in order to transport vases from the plinths into their heist bags. They were unable to touch the vases with their hands and could only move them using ropes. If they triggered the laser beams, the time they had to complete the heist would subsequently be reduced. They managed to secure one vase. The second heist was completed by Emma, Hanah and Khaled who had to answer a series of a questions about their fellow housemates, as well as their time in the house that would spell out letters and numbers to form a code which in turn would open the display cases holding various artefacts. They were only able to guess each code by typing it into the keypad once. At the end of the heist, they only managed to crack one of the codes and therefore could only secure one of the artefacts. After the heists, "Head of House" Marcello, alongside Lily; had to interrogate the housemates, before deciding which of the three crews they thought were the saboteurs. They incorrectly guessed "The Grifter Geezers", and as a result "The Biker Bandits" were successful in avoiding detection. Housemates therefore passed this week's shopping task and received a luxury shopping budget.; On Day 33, as part of Lily's punishment for discussing nominations, housemates were required to take part in "Big Brother's Bootcamp", with the luxury shopping budget being withheld until they did so. The task was overseen by "Head of House" Marcello, who acted as the "drill sergeant". Housemates first were required to complete an assault course, in which they had to march through tires, before crawling under a net and finally completing a lap of the garden whilst jogging continuously. For the next part of the task, housemates had to rank each other based on various characteristics in a series of categories by lining up from "Most to Least". The categories included "Who is biggest rule breaker?", "Who is the most annoying?" and finally "Who is most likely to win Big Brother?". As the "Head of House", Marcello was not included in the rankings, however was given the opportunity to change the line-up as he wished before submitting the result. As further punishment for her rule break, Lily had to complete 10 press ups.
Week 5	Exits	On Day 34, Lily and Khaled became the sixth and seventh housemates to be evicted.
Week 6	Twists	On Day 36, Big Brother opened "The Vault". Housemates each selected an envelope, and were told that whoever chose the envelope containing the gold card with a '£' sign on would have the opportunity to enter "The Vault" and win up to £10,000 from the prize fund. Segun received the gold card, and was then called to the Diary Room, where he was informed that he would have to select three housemates to enter "The Vault" alongside him and that whichever one of the three he chose had the fewest votes to win would be evicted. He chose Ali, Baked Potato and Nathan. Once inside "The Vault", each housemate stood in front of their respective plinths, of which Segun's contained £10,000 in two stacks of £5,000 bundles. He was told to place the money on the housemate(s) he thought would receive the most votes and would therefore be safe. If the housemate(s) Segun placed the money in front of survived, he would get to keep the money, however if he placed the money in front of the evicted housemate, the money would be lost and therefore deducted from the prize fund. He chose to place all £10,000 on Ali, who was subsequently saved from eviction alongside Nathan. Baked Potato received the fewest votes to win out of three housemates chosen to enter "The Vault" and was ultimately evicted.; On Day 37, housemates were gathered at the sofas with Nathan, Sarah, Segun and Thomas subsequently being asked to stand and were informed that they would be entering "The Vault". They were then told that out of the four of them, only two would return to the house, with the other two being evicted. After they had entered "The Vault", the remaining housemates were told that they would have to correctly predict which two housemates would be evicted or else they would lose £10,000 from the prize fund. They collectively predicted that it would be Sarah and Thomas, who ultimately became the ninth and tenth housemates to be evicted respectively after receiving the fewest votes to win. As housemates correctly predicted the eviction result, they kept the money and the prize fund remained at £90,000.
Week 6	Tasks	On Day 35, at various intervals throughout the day, the house phone would ring and housemates would have to stay on the line in order to win a prize. Thomas answered the phone first and remained on hold before ultimately winning an ice cream. Emma answered the phone next and was given the opportunity to win a glass of wine; however she decided not to accept and ended the call. The final housemate to answer the phone was Nathan, who was told he would be able to spy on one housemate by listening to them in the diary room whilst Big Brother asked them questions about certain subjects in the house. He chose Sarah and opted to hear about her first impressions and opinions on relationships in the house. To avoid detection from fellow housemates, Nathan was awarded with tea and a scone.; On Day 37, Marcello was given a secret task in which housemates would be led to believe that they were receiving fan mail from the outside world, however the letters would instead be written by him. If Marcello was successful and the housemates believed the fan mail was genuine, he would win the reward of having his own song "True Colours" played into the house. He avoided detection and therefore passed the task.; On Day 38, the house phone rang and was answered by Hanah. She was told to choose one other housemate to secretly accompany her into "The Vault". She chose Marcello. Once they had entered "The Vault", they were told that later that day, housemates would receive voice messages from their friends and family, however in order to determine who would receive their messages, Hanah and Marcello had to distribute coins accordingly as to whether they wanted a housemate to receive their full message or half of their message. As they had entered "The Vault", Hanah and Marcello automatically received two coins each and received their full message. They had 5 coins to split between their fellow housemates and ultimately gave Emma two coins, meaning she could listen to her full message, whilst they gave Ali, Nathan and Segun one coin each, who therefore could only listen to half of their messages.; On Day 39, Big Brother set Emma and Hanah a task to become beauty therapists and provide a series of spa treatments on their fellow housemates. Ali and Nathan were treated by Hanah, whilst Marcello and Segun were with Emma.; On Day 39, housemates took part in "Big Brother's Badges of Honour" in which they had to pick out a badge from the box at random, each of which contained a different statement or characteristic related to their time in the house, some of which included "Most Embarrassing Moment", "Biggest Regret" and "Biggest Transformation". Housemates then had to provide a fact or story as to why they should be awarded with the badge, before the housemates collectively decided as a group who would claim it.
Week 6	Exits	On Day 36, Baked Potato became the eighth housemate to be evicted, via the back door.; On Day 37, Sarah and Thomas became the ninth and tenth housemates to be evicted, via the back door.; On Day 41, Segun and Nathan finished in sixth and fifth place respectively. Hanah finished in fourth place whilst Emma finished in third. Ali was then announced as the winner, leaving Marcello as the runner-up.

== Production ==
In August 2023, prior to the beginning of the twentieth series, which was the first to be commissioned by ITV following the programme's revival on the channel, ITV's commissioning editor Paul Mortimer confirmed at the Edinburgh International Television Festival that the show would return for a twenty-first series in 2024, stating that the show had been confirmed for "two six-week runs" and also hinted at a revival of Celebrity Big Brother, which in turn was also commissioned and aired its first series on ITV, the twenty-third series of Celebrity Big Brother, in March 2024. Applications for the series opened on 17 November 2023, during the final of the previous series, and closed on 31 July 2024.

=== House ===
In April 2024, it was reported that the Big Brother house was set to be moved from Garden Studios due to it being situated next to a canal, which in turn had resulted in disruption from the public and boat users. However these rumours were later debunked a month later, with planning applications revealing that the house would remain at Garden Studios, with the live set and garden situated in the same place as it was for the previous series. On 4 October 2024, two days before the show's launch, Richard Arnold conducted a tour of the kitchen and living area on Good Morning Britain, before ITV revealed photos of the house on social media later that day. The house maintained a similar structure to the previous series, but with updated colour schemes, as well as decor that resembled dripping paint throughout the house which adapted the theme of the eye logo. The diary room chair also followed the same theme, with multi-coloured cushioning and the outside frame taking the shape of dripping paint.

=== Eye logo ===
On 29 July 2024, the official eye logo for the series was revealed in a 20-second teaser trailer, which aired during the ad-break of the final of the eleventh series of Love Island. The eye depicts different coloured paint mixed together which in turn, drips down to the bottom of the screen.

=== Promotion ===
The official trailer for the series was released on 13 September 2024. It featured a smaller model of the previous series' house, filled with guinea pigs who are seen in different rooms undertaking various activities, all of which are being overseen by hosts Odudu and Best who peer inside. A further promotional teaser on social media featured a person walking towards the London Eye, which features the new eye logo inside it. The series was also promoted via billboards featuring the guinea pigs from the trailer.

== Ratings ==
Official 7-day consolidated ratings in the table below are taken from Thinkbox and include +1, but exclude viewership on devices.

	Viewers (millions)					
	Week 1	Week 2	Week 3	Week 4	Week 5	Week 6
Sunday	1.31	1.12	0.99	1.07	1.03	1.05
Monday	1.22	1.05	1.05	0.99	1.08	1.09
Tuesday	1.07	1.01	0.99	0.99	1.01	1.06
Wednesday	1.15	1.00	1.05	0.98	1.19	1.08
Thursday	1.02	0.97	1.11	1.04	1.11	1.09
Friday	1.07	1.03	1.17	1.12	1.09	1.00
Weekly average	1.14	1.03	1.06	1.03	1.09	1.06
Running average	1.14	1.09	1.08	1.07	1.07	1.07
Series average	1.07					
blue-coloured boxes denote live shows.

=== Late & Live ===
	Viewers (millions)					
	Week 1	Week 2	Week 3	Week 4	Week 5	Week 6
Sunday	0.50	0.30	0.34	0.29	0.34	0.49
Monday	0.36	0.33	0.46	0.33	0.35	0.59
Tuesday	0.32	0.30	0.34	0.34	0.34	0.41
Wednesday	0.28	0.31	0.32	0.45	0.39	0.38
Thursday	0.23	0.30	0.34	0.34	0.35	0.35
Friday	0.35	0.51	0.58	0.64	0.72	0.61

== Controversy and criticism ==
"Big Brother does not allow any personal items into the House that could be deemed harmful. "

"We regret that the implications of this particular item of clothing were not fully understood in our bag checks or prior to broadcast of last night’s show. We apologise to any viewers who have been offended by the broadcast and assure viewers that Big Brother was unaware of the implications of this image."

"The item of clothing has been removed from the House. The Housemate has been spoken to and they have expressed that they are unaware of the implications and did not wish to cause any harm or offence."

"Any offensive messaging associated with the image does not reflect the values or beliefs of Big Brother."

— A spokesperson for Big Brother published a statement following the episode being reinstated.

On Day 17, during the episode broadcast on 22 October 2024, housemate Ali Bromley was shown to be wearing a black t-shirt with a watermelon in the shape of the region of Palestine, with the fruit being used a symbol of solidarity with the State of Palestine in the wake of the Israeli–Palestinian conflict.

Following the airing of that night's highlight programme, both it and the accompanying Late & Live episode were taken down from ITVX following a complaint to the regulator Ofcom by Campaign Against Antisemitism. Following the re-upload of both programmes, Bromley's t-shirt was censored, with the watermelon removed.
