= Teen Big Brother =

Teen Big Brother may refer to:

- Teen Big Brother: The Experiment
- Pinoy Big Brother: Teen Edition
