= Dirty Money (game show) =

- Genre: Game show
- Narrated by: Marcus Bentley
- Country of origin: United Kingdom
- Original language: English
- No. of series: 1
- No. of episodes: 30

Production
- Running time: 30 minutes (inc. adverts)
- Production company: 12 Yard

Original release
- Network: Sky One
- Release: 15 April – 24 May 2002

Dirty Money is a British game show that aired on Sky One from 15 April to 24 May 2002 and is hosted by Marcus Bentley.

== Format ==
The six contestants were each given £500 to start the game. They participated in five rounds of 90 seconds duration each, and had to buzz in to answer questions read by the host. In each of the first four rounds, a correct answer entitled a contestant to steal £50 from an opponent and add it to their own score, while a incorrect answer forced them to give £50 to an opponent. In either case, the responding contestant chose the affected opponent. When time ran out, the contestant with the lowest total was eliminated from the game and forfeited their money. After each of the first three rounds, the eliminated contestant gave their money to the opponent of their choice; after the fourth round, the contestant could divide their money among the two remaining opponents as they wished, in multiples of £50. The fifth round followed the same rules as the first three, but the question value was doubled to £100.

The last remaining contestant, who then held the entire £3,000 initially distributed at the start of the game, had to answer six questions correctly in 75 seconds to keep it. Failure to do so meant they had to give the money to the opponent of their choice.
