= Big Brother (British TV series) =

British version of the Big Brother television series

- The Big Brother 23 eye
- Genre: Reality competition
- Based on: Big Brother by John de Mol Jr.
- Presented by: Davina McCall; Brian Dowling; Emma Willis; AJ Odudu; Will Best
- Starring: Big Brother Housemates
- Narrated by: Marcus Bentley
- Theme music composer: Elementfour
- Opening theme: "Big Brother UK TV Theme"
- Country of origin: United Kingdom
- Original language: English
- No. of series: 23
- No. of episodes: 1654

Production
- Production locations: 3 Mills Studios (2000–2001); Elstree Studios (2002–2018); Garden Studios (2023–2024); Versa Studios (2025–present)
- Production company: Banijay UK (Note: Currently produced under Initial since Series 12. The series was previously produced by Bazal (series 1–2), Endemol UK Productions (series 3–6, Teen), Endemol West (Panto), Brighter Pictures (series 7–10) and Remarkable Television (series 11, Ultimate))

Original release
- Network: Channel 4
- Release: 18 July 2000 – 10 September 2010
- Network: Channel 5
- Release: 9 September 2011 – 5 November 2018
- Network: ITV2
- Release: 8 October 2023 – present

Related
- Celebrity Big Brother

Big Brother is the British version of the international reality television franchise Big Brother created by producer John de Mol Jr. in 1997. Broadcast yearly from 18 July 2000 to 5 November 2018, and again from 8 October 2023, the show follows the format of other national editions, in which a group of contestants, known as "housemates", live together in a specially constructed house that is isolated from the outside world. Live television cameras and personal audio microphones continuously monitor them. The titular name and concept of surveillance of the housemates derives from George Orwell’s famous dystopian novel Nineteen Eighty-Four. However unlike in the novel Big Brother acts as a authoritative voice more akin to O’Brien in Orwell’s novel almost interrogating the housemates in a separate room. Throughout the competition, housemates are "evicted" from the house by public televoting. The last remaining housemate wins the competition and a cash prize.

The series premiered in 2000 on Channel 4 and immediately became a ratings hit. It featured a 24-hour live feed in which fans could view inside the house at any time. Big Brother aired for eleven series on Channel 4, followed by one final special edition, Ultimate Big Brother, which ended in 2010. Channel 5 then acquired the rights to the series and relaunched it in 2011. On the day of the nineteenth series launch in 2018, Channel 5 announced that Big Brother would not be returning to the channel after the series had concluded. In 2020, E4 aired previous episodes of Big Brother in a series titled Big Brother: Best Shows Ever to mark the 20th anniversary of the programme. Two years later, it was announced by ITV that Big Brother be relaunched on ITV2. It premiered in 2023 and has aired annually on ITV2 since.

The programme was initially presented by Davina McCall from its inception in July 2000 until its cancellation by Channel 4 ten years later. McCall declined to return as presenter following the programme's move to Channel 5 and the role was taken up by former series winner Brian Dowling. He remained as presenter throughout the twelfth and thirteenth series. Emma Willis later replaced Dowling from the fourteenth series, until its cancellation from Channel 5. Since the series' launch on ITV, AJ Odudu and Will Best have hosted both the main show and a "nightly spin-off" show. Marcus Bentley has served as the off-screen narrator of all series since the show premiered in 2000. Big Brother has had numerous spin-off series occur since its premiere, most notably Celebrity Big Brother, a shorter version of the main series wherein the cast is composed solely of celebrities. Numerous other spin-off series that are not competition based have aired, with Dermot O'Leary, Russell Brand, George Lamb, Emma Willis and Rylan Clark all presenting spin-offs.

== Format ==
"Big Brother house, this is Davina. You are live on Channel 4; please do not swear. (nominated housemates' names), the lines are closed; the votes have been counted and verified, and I can now reveal that the nth person to be evicted from the Big Brother House is...(evicted housemate's name(s)). (Evicted housemate's name), you have 30 seconds to say your goodbyes; I'm coming to get you!"

— McCall's speech when announcing the evicted housemate. Future presenters altered this.

Big Brother is a game show in which a group of contestants, referred to as housemates, live in isolation from the outside world in a custom-built "house", constantly under video surveillance. During their time in the house, the housemates are required to nominate two of their fellow contestants for potential eviction, and the two or more with the most votes would be nominated. This process is mandatory for all housemates, and failure to comply could result in expulsion from the house. During the show's broadcast on Channel 4, the viewers would vote to evict one of the nominated housemates. The housemate with the most votes would be removed from the house. The twelfth and thirteenth series, the first two to air under Channel 5, saw the public voting to save a housemate, and the housemate with the fewest votes would be evicted. Beginning with the fourteenth series, the vote to evict format returned to the series. During the eighteenth series, both vote to save and vote to evict were used. The voting process can be done via telephone or online. When the final week arrives, the viewers vote for which of the remaining housemates should win the series, and the housemate with the most votes becomes the winner. The prize fund has varied throughout the series, ranging from £50,000 to £150,000.

During their time in the house, housemates are given weekly tasks. The housemates wager a portion of their weekly shopping budget on the task and either win double their wagered fund or lose the wagered fund depending on their performance. The housemates are required to work as a group to complete their tasks, with the format of the tasks varying based on the number of remaining housemates. Throughout the series, some housemates have been given secret tasks that must be completed individually or with a small group; failure to do so can result in the housemate being nominated or punished. Should the housemates run out of the food provided for them, an emergency ration is available to them. The housemates are forbidden from discussing nominations, and doing so could result in punishment. The format of the series is mainly seen as a social experiment, and requires housemates to interact with others who may have differing ideals, beliefs, and prejudices. Housemates are also required to make visits to the diary room during their stay in the house, where they are able to share their thoughts and feelings on their fellow housemates and the game.

== History ==
=== Main series ===
==== Channel 4 (2000–2010) ====
The Big Brother reality series was created by John de Mol Jr. and premiered in the Netherlands. Following the success of the initial series, it was confirmed that editions for both the United Kingdom and the United States were in the works. In March 2000, it was revealed that the series would be broadcast by Channel 4 and E4; casting began shortly afterward, and Davina McCall MBE was later revealed to be the presenter. The first series premiered on 18 July 2000, and ended when housemate Craig Phillips was crowned the winner after 64 days in the House. The series proved to be a hit early in its run, leading to a second series.

Big Brother 2 premiered on 25 May 2001 and continued the success of the previous series. The series concluded on 27 July 2001, when Brian Dowling was crowned the winner. The third series premiered on 24 May 2002, and was the first series to feature a live premiere. Much like the previous series, the show lasted for 64 days and saw Kate Lawler win the prize. With the third series finding even more success than its predecessors, a fourth series began on 23 May 2003. The series was one of the first to feature numerous twists throughout the series, including nominations on the first night and swapping a housemate with a housemate from the African edition of the series. The series concluded after 64 days, with Cameron Stout being crowned the winner. Despite the fourth series seeing a decrease in viewership and voting numbers, a fifth series began on 28 May 2004. The series became one of the most controversial series at the time, mainly due to events such as "Fight Night" and the expulsion of two housemates. The series lasted for 71 days, with Nadia Almada becoming the first transgender housemate to win the series.

Following the success of the fifth series, the sixth series began on 27 May 2005 and lasted for a total of 78 days. The series was met with much controversy surrounding housemates Anthony Hutton and Makosi Musambasi, the former of which went on to win the series. The seventh series premiered on 18 May 2006, and became the first series to feature over twenty housemates. It became the first series to last longer than 90 days. It was met with much controversy after allowing previously evicted housemate Nikki Grahame to return to the game with the chance of winning. Pete Bennett was ultimately crowned the winner of the series. The eighth series premiered on 30 May 2007 and became the longest series to date at 94 days. The series featured a set of twins in the house, who competed initially as individuals but later became one housemate. Brian Belo was crowned the winner of the series. Belo was the only black housemate to win the programme. The ninth series featured a "Heaven and Hell" theme, and premiered on 5 June 2008. Rachel Rice was the winner of the series after spending 93 days in the house. On 4 June 2009, the tenth series premiered and saw housemates having to complete tasks in order to earn housemate status. Sophie Reade was the winner of the series, which lasted for a total of 93 days.

9 June 2010 saw the premiere of the eleventh series. It was also confirmed that 2010 would be the final year of Big Brother on Channel 4 with McCall. The series lasted for a total of 77 days, with Josie Gibson being crowned the winner. Merely minutes after BB11 concluded, a special edition titled Ultimate Big Brother, featuring memorable former housemates competing for the title of "Ultimate Housemate". Big Brother 2 winner Brian Dowling, won the series after 18 days in the house.

==== Channel 5 (2011–2018) ====
After Richard Desmond bought Channel 5 in 2010, he stated that he was keen to acquire Big Brother. Meanwhile, Endemol had been granted permission to keep the Big Brother house at the Elstree TV Studios until 30 September 2013. On 2 April 2011, Channel 5 formally confirmed that they had signed a £200 million two-year contract with Endemol to screen Big Brother from 18 August 2011. Big Brother 2 and Ultimate winner Brian Dowling was announced as the new presenter. McCall declined the offer to present, having said goodbye to the show in 2010. On 3 May 2011, Endemol and Channel 5 officially opened the process for people to apply to be on the show. The twelfth series officially launched on 9 September 2011. Aaron Allard-Morgan was crowned the winner after spending 64 days in the house. The thirteenth series premiered on 5 June 2012, and was won by Luke Anderson. The thirteenth series was also Dowling's last appearance as host.

On 2 April 2013, it was confirmed that Dowling would be replaced by Emma Willis, who had previously presented a spin-off series for the show. The fourteenth series premiered on 13 June 2013, and was won by Sam Evans. The fifteenth series launched on 5 June 2014 and was won by Helen Wood, making her the first female winner since the show's revival on Channel 5. The sixteenth series began on 12 May 2015, the earliest Big Brother launch to date. Chloe Wilburn was announced as the winner of that series. The seventeenth series launched on 7 June 2016, it was the first Big Brother series to feature two separate houses. The winner was stunt double Jason Burrill. He was the oldest housemate to win the main series to date. The eighteenth series launched on 5 June 2017 and was won by Isabelle Warburton. She was the first woman to win Big Brother as a late entrant, and at just 38 days in the house, she has also spent the least amount of time in the house for a winner of the regular series.

On 14 September 2018, Channel 5 announced that the nineteenth series would be the last on Channel 5. Cameron Cole was the winner of the final series and the programme's youngest. Big Brother ended on Channel 5 in November 2018. The nineteenth series was also Willis' last appearance as host.

==== ITV2 (2023–present) ====
In April 2022, it was reported that ITV Studios were in talks with Banijay, who own the rights to Big Brother, to revive the show in 2023. On 1 August 2022, ITV aired a teaser trailer during the final of the eighth series of Love Island, officially confirming that the series would return for a new series in 2023 on ITV2 and ITVX, which resulted the switch from its usual summer slot to an autumn slot instead, to avoid the scheduling clash with the rival reality show Love Island. The series was confirmed to run for "up to six weeks" with housemates coming from "all walks of life". Eight months after the new series was announced, it was revealed that AJ Odudu and Will Best would co-host both the main show and sideshow. Odudu and Best's appointment marked the first appearances of double hosts, instead of a single host format from the past nineteen series. The twentieth series began on 8 October 2023, and comprised 36 episodes, with the live final taking place on 17 November 2023, where Jordan Sangha was crowned the winner of the series.

The twenty-first series of Big Brother began on 6 October 2024, once again comprising 36 episodes. The live final aired on 15 November 2024, when Ali Bromley was announced as the winner. The twenty-second series began on 28 September 2025. The series was extended by a week. With a run of 48 days, concluding on 14 November 2025, Richard Storry was announced as the oldest-ever winner of the series. ITV renewed Big Brother for a twenty-third series, which aired in late 2026; it was once again extended and ran for eight weeks.

== Hosts and narrator ==
Person	Series																									
Person	1	2	3	4	Teen	5	Panto	6	7	8	9	10	11	Ultimate	12	13	14	15	16	17	18	19	20	21	22	23
Host
Davina McCall																										
Dermot O'Leary																										
Jeff Brazier																										
Brian Dowling																										
Emma Willis																										
AJ Odudu																										
Will Best																										
Narrator
Marcus Bentley																										

== Series overview ==
Series	Host(s)	Days	Housemates	Winner	Runner-up	Average viewers (millions)	Episodes	Originally released		
Series	Host(s)	Days	Housemates	Winner	Runner-up	Average viewers (millions)	Episodes	First released	Last released	Network
1	Davina McCall	64	11	Craig Phillips	Anna Nolan	4.44	52	18 July 2000	15 September 2000	Channel 4
2	Davina McCall	64	11	Brian Dowling	Helen Adams	4.59	55	25 May 2001	27 July 2001	Channel 4
3	Davina McCall	64	14	Kate Lawler	Jonny Regan	5.89	72	24 May 2002	26 July 2002	Channel 4
4	Davina McCall	64	13	Cameron Stout	Ray Shah	4.57	73	23 May 2003	25 July 2003	Channel 4
Teen	Dermot O'Leary	10	8	Paul Brennan	Caroline Cloke	2.60	5	13 October 2003	17 October 2003	Channel 4
5	Davina McCall	71	13	Nadia Almada	Jason Cowan	5.03	82	28 May 2004	6 August 2004	Channel 4
Panto	Jeff Brazier	11	10	—N/a	—N/a	—N/a	12	20 December 2004	5 January 2005	Channel 4, E4
6	Davina McCall	78	16	Anthony Hutton	Eugene Sully	4.55	90	27 May 2005	12 August 2005	Channel 4
7	Davina McCall	93	22	Pete Bennett	Glyn Wise	4.68	107	18 May 2006	18 August 2006	Channel 4
8	Davina McCall	94	22	Brian Belo	Amanda & Sam Marchant	3.83	96	30 May 2007	31 August 2007	Channel 4
9	Davina McCall	93	21	Rachel Rice	Michael Hughes	3.29	108	5 June 2008	5 September 2008	Channel 4
10	Davina McCall	93	22	Sophie Reade	Siavash Sabbaghpour	2.24	108	4 June 2009	4 September 2009	Channel 4
11	Davina McCall	77	21	Josie Gibson	Dave Vaughan	2.60	86	9 June 2010	24 August 2010	Channel 4
Ultimate	Davina McCall	18	14	Brian Dowling	Nikki Grahame	2.93	22	24 August 2010	10 September 2010	Channel 4
12	Brian Dowling	64	15	Aaron Allard-Morgan	Jay McKray	1.55	71	9 September 2011	11 November 2011	Channel 5
13	Brian Dowling	70	17	Luke Anderson	Adam Kelly	1.63	73	5 June 2012	13 August 2012	Channel 5
14	Emma Willis	68	14	Sam Evans	Dexter Koh	1.70	69	13 June 2013	13 August 2013	Channel 5
15	Emma Willis	72	19	Helen Wood	Ashleigh Coyle	1.57	72	5 June 2014	15 August 2014	Channel 5
16	Emma Willis	66	18	Chloe Wilburn	Joel Williams	1.40	66	12 May 2015	16 July 2015	Channel 5
17	Emma Willis	50	19	Jason Burrill	Hughie Maughan	1.60	50	7 June 2016	26 July 2016	Channel 5
18	Emma Willis	54	22	Isabelle Warburton	Raph Korine	1.24	54	5 June 2017	28 July 2017	Channel 5
19	Emma Willis	53	16	Cameron Cole	Akeem Griffiths	1.07	45	14 September 2018	5 November 2018	Channel 5
20	Will Best; AJ Odudu	42	16	Jordan Sangha	Olivia Young	1.71	36	8 October 2023	17 November 2023	ITV2
21	Will Best; AJ Odudu	41	16	Ali Bromley	Marcello Spooks	1.07	36	6 October 2024	15 November 2024	ITV2
22	Will Best; AJ Odudu	48	17	Richard Storry	Elsa Rae	0.90	42	28 September 2025	14 November 2025	ITV2
23	Will Best; AJ Odudu	54	17	Rochelle Rackham	Lucinda "Twinks" Burnett	1.07	47	13 September 2026	5 November 2026	ITV2

== Production ==
=== Broadcast ===
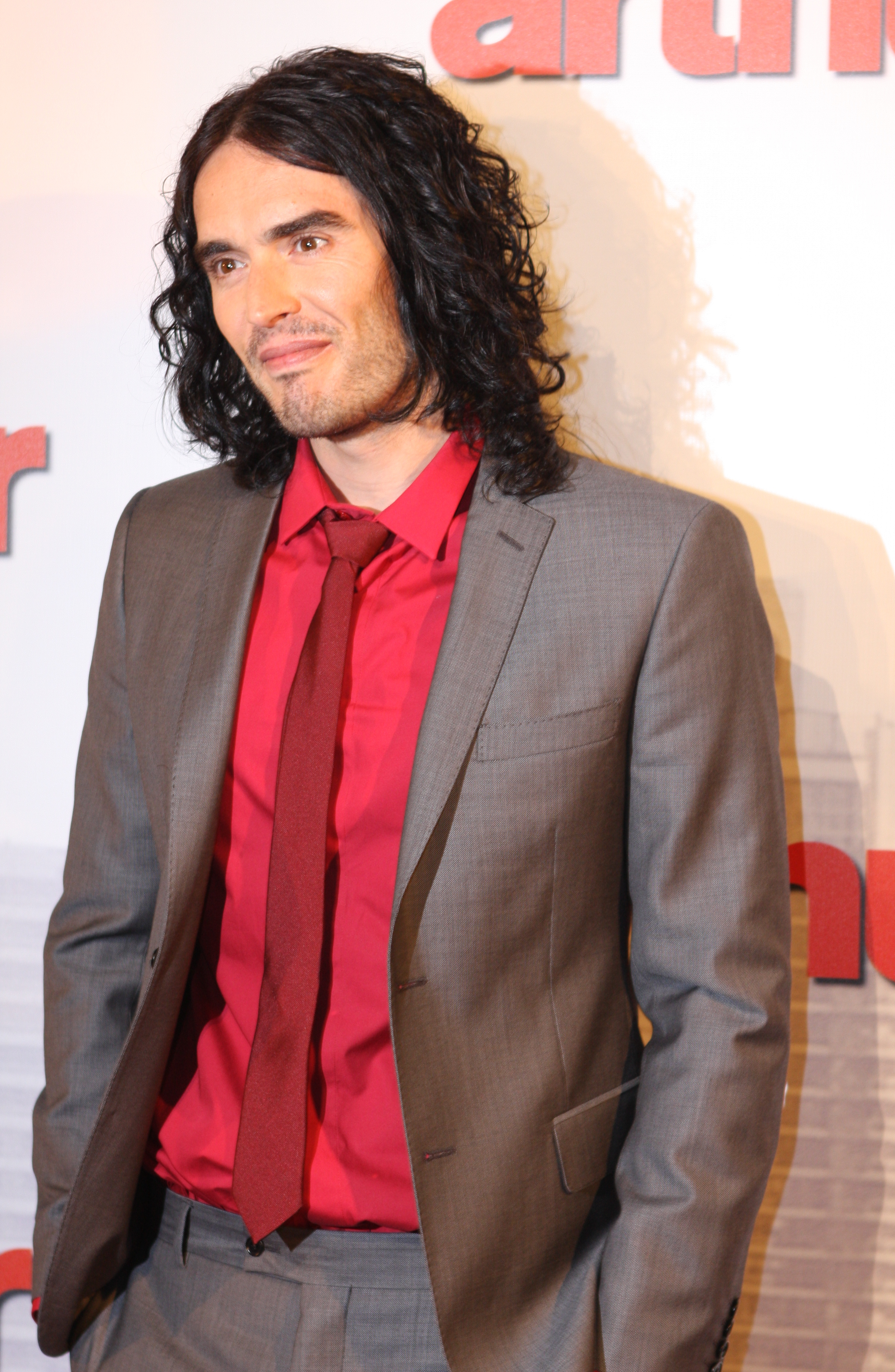
Russell Brand (above) presented the spin-off series Big Brother's Big Mouth.

During the premiere series, the show aired six nights a week, being every night excluding Saturday. The eviction episodes and final aired on Fridays; after series presenter McCall announced the evictee, they had two hours to pack their belongings and exit the house during a second episode airing that night. The remaining five weekly shows were highlight episodes, which lasted an hour in length; the Sunday episode featured a group of psychologists discussing the events of the house. The second series aired six nights a week during the premiere week, though was reduced to only five days afterwards, not airing on Saturday or Sunday. This series featured two eviction episodes as well, though only featured a ninety-minute gap between the two. Big Brother 3 was the first series to air every night each week, and every series after that featured only thirty minutes between eviction episodes. The third series was the first in the main series to feature a live launch, with all subsequent series featuring a live launch. The series continued to air for seven nights a week until Big Brother 8, which aired every night excluding Saturday. The ninth series re-introduced the seven episodes per week format, which has been continued throughout all future series. When the series premiered, it was aired in a 4:3 aspect ratio instead of the more common 16:9 widescreen format seen by other series at the time. Beginning in 2006 with the seventh series, the show was broadcast in the 16:9 format. Following the show's move to Channel 5, it was broadcast in HD. The series can be viewed on Demand 5, a branch of Channel 5, after it airs.

Aside from the main series, the show featured a live feed into the house where viewers could watch the housemates at any time. With the series debut in 2000, the twenty-four-hour live feed was introduced which was available at any time to viewers for free. The live feed featured an estimated ten-minute delay to comply with broadcasting standards. Beginning with the second series, the live feed became available on E4 as well. In 2009, it was confirmed that the live feeds would not return for the tenth series due to a "small uptake" of subscriptions in the previous year. The feeds did return the following year, though required viewers to pay a fee, for what was at the time slated to be the show's final series. Following the show's move to Channel 5, the live feeds have not been featured for any subsequent series. In 2013, it was announced that the live feed would return in the form of a two-hour nightly show that featured a live look into the House; the show was cancelled in June of that year, reportedly due to low ratings. Despite this, the feed was re-instated onto the official Channel 5 website for the remainder of the fourteenth series.

Numerous spin-off series have aired immediately after or shortly following the highlight and live episodes. Big Brother's Big Mouth, aired following the highlight shows. The show was initially presented by Russell Brand from 2004 to 2007, but he did not return for subsequent series which featured a different presenter weekly. Big Brother's Big Mouth did not return following the show's move to Channel 5. Throughout the third, fourth, and fifth series' there were no weekly tasks, and the housemates instead participated in tasks during the Saturday Night Live weekly show. Big Brother's Big Brain also aired once per week, and featured a more psychological analysis of the series; it aired for two series, being renamed Big Brother: On the Couch for its second and final series. Big Brother's Bit on the Side was aired seven nights a week on Channel 5 and 5*, either immediately following or an hour after the nightly episode. Live from the House, which features a live feed into the house, airs immediately following the live eviction episode.

Big Brother theme song.
A 17 second audio sample of the series' theme song.

The opening theme for the series was both written and produced by Elementfour, which was a collaboration between Paul Oakenfold and Andy Gray. Following the success of the first series, the theme was released as a single on 28 August 2000. The single proved to be successful, reaching number 4 on the UK Singles Chart. The theme was also featured on the soundtrack for the first series, which was released that same year. Since the series premiered, there have been numerous remixes and changes made to the song. The original theme by Oakenfeld and Gray was used through the first five series, however was later replaced by a revamped version from the sixth series onward. The song was remixed with a Christmas theme to promote Big Brother Panto in 2004, while a carnival themed edition was made to promote the final series to air on Channel 4. The intro to each series, which featured the theme song, was often based on the twist or theme of the house for the year. Each series was promoted with a different eye logo, with the logo also representing the theme of the house. The eye logo is meant to symbolize the phrase "Big Brother is watching" taken from the Orwell novel. The logo for the first series was a close-up of housemate Melanie Hill's eye, while the logos for the second through eleventh series' were created by Daniel Eatock. Design team Hello Charlie, who had previously created the series intros, created the eye logo for the twelfth and thirteenth series following the show's move to Channel 5. The fourteenth to eighteenth series logos were created by the design studio Shop.

=== House ===
For the first two series, the house was located in Bow, London, near the 3 Mills Studios. After planning permission expired in 2002, Newham London Borough Council ordered the complex to be returned to a natural habitat. The house had been located at Elstree Studios, Borehamwood, Hertfordshire since Big Brother 3 in 2002. Following a break in during the second series, it was reported that security had increased to the point that the house was more secure than Buckingham Palace. The interior of the house has changed each year, reflecting a certain theme or twist in the game. The fifth series, which featured stricter rules and consequences, featured a harsh colour scheme and a claustrophobic setting. The third series featured a "Rich and Poor" twist, thus a row of bars was placed in the centre of the house to divide the housemates. The diary room features a different design each year, and was frequently the last room of the house to be revealed to the public. Each series has featured a garden in the house, which has included outdoor furniture, a Jacuzzi, and on some occasions other luxuries. The seventh series featured an "inside out" theme for the house, thus items such as the dining table were located in the garden. Similarly, the eighth series' refrigerator was located in the garden, as part of its "modernistic sur-reality" theme.

On 2 February 2016, a planning application to Hertsmere Borough Council revealed that Endemol had applied to build a new extension to the house, which would be its biggest renovation since it was built in 2002. The documents teased a second house with another garden and a new exterior set and interview studio. The old eviction set and eye studio were both demolished following the conclusion of Celebrity Big Brother 17. It was later announced on 18 March 2016 that permission had been granted with no objections. Despite the overall extension, the new outdoor set was smaller than before, holding a capacity of just 400 compared to 470 beforehand.

From Celebrity Big Brother 19 in 2017 until the show's cancellation on Channel 5 the following year, "The Other House" used in the seventeenth regular series was referred to as "The Task Building" making it the house's third task room along with the small and large task room.

In January 2019, two months after the conclusion of the nineteenth series, work began to demolish the house at Elstree Studios. On 17 February 2019, former presenter Emma Willis posted a photo on her Instagram account showing that demolition work on the house was complete.

Following the announcement of the ITV reboot, speculation began as to where the new house would be built. In May 2023, it was confirmed that the house would be located at Garden Studios in North London and included "versatile staging", as well as an "in-house virtual production studio".

On 17 December 2024, ITV announced that the house would be relocated from Garden Studios to a new site in preparation for the 2025 celebrity series. The following month, it was announced that the house would be built at Titan Studios, rendering it the fourth house to be used for the series since the show's inception.

=== Sponsorships ===
==== Channel 4 (2000–2010) ====
Series	Sponsor	Slogan	Notes	Year(s)
1	Southern Comfort	—N/a		2000
2	BT Cellnet	It's the Buzz		2001
3	O_{2}	Get Connected	See note 1	2002
4	O_{2}	Get Connected		2003
Teen	O_{2}	Get Connected		2003
5	TalkTalk	Get Together		2004
Panto	TalkTalk	Get Together		2004–05
6	TalkTalk	Get Together		2005
7	The Carphone Warehouse	Get Together		2006
8	Virgin Media	For a Happy House		2007
9	Virgin Mobile	For a Happy House	See note 2	2008
10	Lucozade Energy	Little Brother vs. Big Brother		2009
11	Freederm	Skincare for spot-prone skin		2010
Ultimate	Freederm	Skincare for spot-prone skin		2010

==== Channel 5 (2011–2018) ====
Series	Sponsor	Slogan	Notes	Year(s)
12	Freederm	Well worth a closer look		2011
13	Schwarzkopf Live Color XXL	If you've got the attitude we've got the colour		2012
14	SuperCasino	Feel it for real	See note 3	2013
15	SuperCasino	#supercass	See note 3	2014
16	Lucozade Energy	Find Your Flow		2015
17	Betway	...Sponsors tonight's Big Brother		2016
18	Castle Jackpot	...Sponsors tonight's Big Brother		2017
19	Pink Casino	...Sponsors tonight's Big Brother		2018

==== ITV2 (2023–present) ====
Series	Sponsor	Slogan	Notes	Year(s)
20	Vinted	An eye for pre-loved fashion		2023
21	Vinted	An eye for pre-loved fashion		2024
22	Mr.Vegas	Woah Mr.Vegas		2025
23	Mr.Vegas	Woah Mr.Vegas		2026

Notes

- ^1In 2002 BT Cellnet changed its name to O2, the sponsor is therefore the same as the previous series
- ^2Although the change of the name of the sponsor, it is still the same company and the same sponsor adverts were used
- ^3This sponsorship is only shown after 9.00pm

== Controversies and criticism ==
Since its inception, Big Brother has come under fire for reports of bullying, racism, rigging, and the physical and mental strain of appearing on the series.

In October 2024, ITV edited an episode of the series to remove all images of a watermelon symbol that appeared on the shirt of contestant Ali Bromley. Watermelon, which shares the same colours as the flag of Palestine, has been used as a symbol of Palestinian solidarity since the 1960s. Writing for The Intercept, Nikita Mazurov compared the action to George Orwell's dystopian science-fiction novel Nineteen Eighty-Four, from which the show Big Brother takes its name, arguing that the editing of the episode represented a "key [tenet] of the novel: old media being edited and original versions destroyed, leaving no trace of any modification having taken place."

== Legacy ==
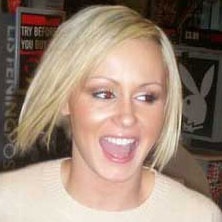
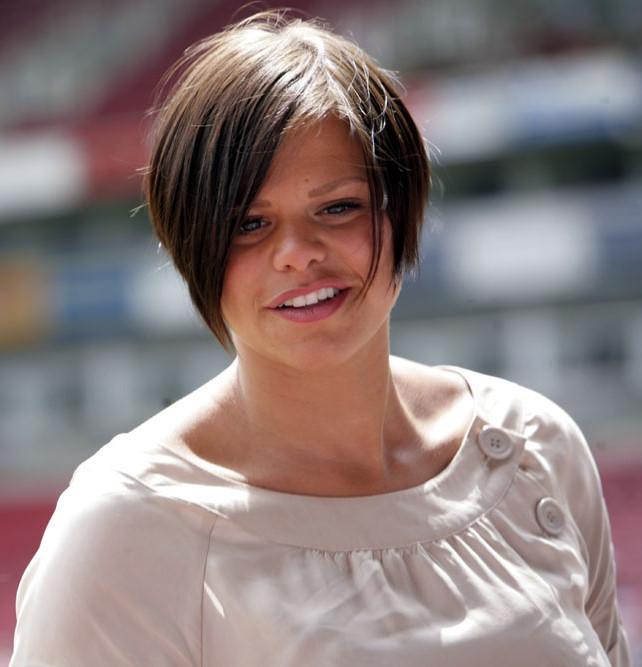
Housemates Chanelle Hayes (left) and Jade Goody (right) were among several housemates who enjoyed much media attention after their respective series.

Since its premiere, Big Brother has been the centre of much publicity, and has received much media attention. The series often receives coverage from tabloid newspapers, magazines, and online bloggers. The series has been a ratings success since it premiered, with the first eviction tally receiving 387,000 votes. The eviction episode itself received a total of 3.4 million viewers. The series continued to have successful viewership, with the third series finale reaching over 9.9 million viewers. The vote for the third series finale saw over 8.6 million viewers voting for whom should win the series. A number of books have been written about the series, including Big Brother: The Official Unseen Story by Jean Ritchie (ISBN 978-0-7522-1912-7), The Psychology of Big Brother by Dan Jones (ISBN 978-1-4092-2825-7), and Visible Thought: The New Psychology of Body Language by Geoffrey Beattie (ISBN 978-0-415-30810-6). Narinder Kaur, who had previously appeared as a housemate in the second series, went on to release Big Brother: The Inside Story (ISBN 978-0-7535-1294-4).

Following their appearance on the series, numerous former housemates enjoyed moderate fame and success in the public eye. Most notably, Big Brother 3 housemate Jade Goody went on to have a successful career in reality television and later went on to appear in the fifth edition of Celebrity Big Brother. Goody died in 2009 due to cancer. Following her appearance on the series, Goody has frequently been referred to as one of the most successful former housemates. Following the initial conclusion of the series in 2010, a special titled Jade Goody: Ultimate Housemate aired on Channel 4 in memory of Goody. Housemates such as Alison Hammond, Brian Dowling, and Aisleyne Horgan-Wallace have enjoyed considerable success appearing in television series and reality television following their appearance on Big Brother. Housemates Nadia Almada, Craig Phillips, and Nichola Holt all released music following their appearance on the series, with Phillips ultimately having the most success. Nikki Grahame, who rose to fame in the seventh series, had her own television series titled Princess Nikki that ran for six weeks on E4. She later went on to appear in numerous reality television series. Chanelle Hayes, who appeared on the eighth series, went on to release a single, work as a model, and receive her own reality television series.

The series has gone on to be spoofed and parodied by comedians such as Alan Carr, Justin Lee Collins, and Ricky Gervais. The series has been parodied and re-enacted on programs such as The Friday Night Project, an episode of Doctor Who ("Bad Wolf"), and Extras. The Ben Elton novel Dead Famous, published in 2001, is a murder-mystery novel in a setting similar to that of Big Brother. In October 2008, E4 aired the horror series Dead Set which was set during a fictional series of Big Brother. The series featured numerous former housemates, as well as presenter Davina McCall in various roles throughout the series.

== Spin-offs ==
Since its inception, Big Brother has seen numerous spin-offs and tie-in series launches on both Channel 4 and Channel 5. The most notable spin-off, Celebrity Big Brother, began initially as a one-time series and involved six celebrities staying in the house for eight days. Following the success of the series, Celebrity Big Brother went on to become an annual production, much like the main series. Following widespread media attention involving racism during the fifth series, the show was not broadcast the following year. The show returned in 2009, and the final series to air on Channel 4 aired in 2010. Following the show's move to Channel 5, Celebrity Big Brother began airing two series per year until its cancellation alongside the regular series in September 2018. In 2023, ITV announced they were bringing it back in 2024 alongside the civilian series, but this time the main show will be on ITV1 and STV rather than ITV2.

The show has also had various other spin-off series occur since its premiere. The first spin-off, Teen Big Brother: The Experiment, premiered on 13 October 2003 and lasted ten days. The series was met with much controversy, which was later heightened when two of the cast members had sex in the house. Big Brother Panto, which aired in 2004, saw the return of ten former housemates who re-enacted their rendition of Cinderella. Ultimate Big Brother was the final series to air on Channel 4, and featured fourteen of the most memorable housemates from both the main series and Celebrity Big Brother competing in the series. Brian Dowling became the only housemate to win a series twice after winning Ultimate Big Brother. Numerous other spin-offs have occurred throughout the series such as Big Brother's Big Mouth, presented by Russell Brand, and Big Brother's Little Brother presented by Dermot O'Leary. Following the show's move to Channel 5, Big Brother's Bit on the Side and Celebrity Big Brother were the only spin-off series now airing.

== Awards and nominations ==
Year	Award show	Category	Nominee(s)	Result
2000	Royal Television Society Craft & Design Awards	Design & Craft Innovation	Colin Pigott	Nominated
2000	Royal Television Society Craft & Design Awards	Lighting, Photography & Camera - Multicamera Work	Michael Lingard, Simon Staffurth	Won
2000	Royal Television Society Craft & Design Awards	Team	Richard Hopkins, Ruth Wrigley, Conrad Green	Won
2001	British Academy Television Awards	Innovation Award	Big Brother 1	Won
2001	Royal Television Society Programme Awards	Features Primetime	Big Brother 1	Won
2001	Royal Television Society Programme Awards	Presenter	Davina McCall	Nominated
2001	Royal Television Society Programme Awards	Team	Production team	Nominated
2001	Royal Television Society Craft & Design Awards	Production Design - Entertainment & Non-Drama Productions	Colin Piggot	Won
2001	National Television Awards	Most Popular Factual Programme	Big Brother 2	Won
2002	National Television Awards	Most Popular Factual Programme	Big Brother 3	Won
2002	National Television Awards	Most Popular Entertainment Presenter	Davina McCall	Nominated
2003	National Television Awards	Most Popular Factual Programme	Big Brother 4	Nominated
2003	National Television Awards	Most Popular Entertainment Presenter	Davina McCall	Nominated
2004	National Television Awards	Most Popular Reality Programme	Big Brother 5	Won
2004	National Television Awards	Most Popular Entertainment Presenter	Davina McCall	Nominated
2004	National Television Awards	Most Popular Entertainment Presenter	Dermot O'Leary	Nominated
2005	National Television Awards	Most Popular Reality Programme	Big Brother 6	Won
2005	National Television Awards	Most Popular Entertainment Presenter	Davina McCall	Nominated
2006	National Television Awards	Most Popular Reality Programme	Big Brother 7	Won
2006	National Television Awards	Most Popular Reality Programme	Celebrity Big Brother 4	Nominated
2006	National Television Awards	Most Popular TV Contender	Nikki Grahame	Won
2006	National Television Awards	Most Popular TV Contender	Pete Bennett	Nominated
2006	National Television Awards	Most Popular TV Contender	Chantelle Houghton	Nominated
2006	National Television Awards	Most Popular Entertainment Presenter	Davina McCall	Nominated
2007	British Academy Television Awards	Pioneer Audience Award	Celebrity Big Brother 5	Nominated
2007	National Television Awards	Most Popular Entertainment Programme	Big Brother 8	Nominated
2008	National Television Awards	Most Popular Entertainment Programme	Big Brother 9	Nominated
2009	Digital Spy Reality TV Awards 2009	Sexiest Male	Stuart Pilkington	Nominated
2009	Digital Spy Reality TV Awards 2009	Sexiest Male	Dale Howard	Won
2009	Digital Spy Reality TV Awards 2009	Love to Hate Award	Rex Newmark	Won
2009	Digital Spy Reality TV Awards 2009	Best Reality TV Moment	Luke Marsden and Rebecca Shiner kiss	Nominated
2009	Digital Spy Reality TV Awards 2009	Most Memorable Moment	Mohamed and Kathreya's eviction	Nominated
2009	Digital Spy Reality TV Awards 2009	Best Presenter	Davina McCall	Won
2009	Digital Spy Reality TV Awards 2009	Best Reality Show	Big Brother 9	Nominated
2009	Digital Spy Reality TV Awards 2009	Reality TV Legend Award	Davina McCall	Won
2010	National Television Awards	Most Popular Entertainment Programme	Big Brother 10	Nominated
2011	National Television Awards	Most Popular Entertainment Presenter	Davina McCall	Nominated
2011	National Television Awards	Most Popular Entertainment Programme	Big Brother 11	Nominated
2015	National Television Awards	Most Popular Entertainment Programme	Celebrity Big Brother	Nominated
2016	National Television Awards	Most Popular TV Presenter	Rylan Clark-Neal	Nominated
2024	National Television Awards	Reality Competition	Celebrity Big Brother 23	Nominated

== See also ==
- Big Brother franchise
- List of Big Brother housemates
