= Big Brother (British TV series) series 19 =

Big Brother
- Series 19
- Series nineteen logo
- Hosted by: Emma Willis
- No. of days: 53
- No. of housemates: 16
- Winner: Cameron Cole
- Runner-up: Akeem Griffiths
- Companion show: Big Brother's Bit on the Side
- No. of episodes: 45

Release
- Original network: Channel 5
- Original release: 14 September – 5 November 2018

Series chronology
- ← Previous; Series 18 Next → Series 20

Big Brother 2018, also known as Big Brother 19, is the nineteenth series of Big Brother, and the final series to air on Channel 5. The series launched four days after the final of Celebrity Big Brother 22 on 14 September 2018 and lasted for 53 days with the final episode airing on 5 November 2018. The series is the eighth regular and twenty-third series of Big Brother to air on Channel 5 since 2011; it was also the final series of Big Brother in the three-year contract that was announced on 19 March 2015, which guaranteed that the show would air on Channel 5 until 2018.

On 14 September 2018, it was confirmed that this series would be the final series to air on Channel 5.

On 5 November 2018, Cameron Cole was announced as the winner of the series, beating Akeem Griffiths who finished as runner-up. At 19 years old, Cole is the youngest winner of Big Brother in the UK series' eighteen-year history. Much like Ultimate Big Brother, the final Channel 4 series, the series ended with the words "Big Brother will get back to you".

Following Channel 5's decision in 2018 not to renew their contract with Endemol/Initial TV to show the series, ITV2 bought the rights to Big Brother in the United Kingdom, where it was broadcast from 8 October 2023, currently hosted by AJ Odudu and Will Best.

This marked the last regular appearance of Emma Willis as presenter after six series.

== Format ==
On several occasions in the run-up to Celebrity Big Brother 22, various news reports and Big Brother alumni hinted at the series going back to its roots, with less producer manipulation and a focus on the show as a social experiment.

The shows' producers also met with several fansites to discuss the direction of the show, with it being heavily reported that the show will bring back weekly shopping tasks and a consistent nominations format.

== Housemates ==
In an interview with fansite "BBSpy", creative director Paul Osborne stated that the team were actively trying to find "totally unknown" housemates for the series. In the past, some housemates had previously appeared on reality shows such as The Valleys, Ibiza Weekender and Ex on the Beach.

On 10 September 2018, during the final of Celebrity Big Brother 22, a trailer was released showing close-ups of each of the fourteen housemates with their occupation, age and home town, and the public were granted the power to give one of them an early advantage in the series by voting in a poll.

Name	Age on entry	Hometown	Day entered	Day exited	Result
Cameron Cole	18	Norwich	1	53	Winner
Akeem Griffiths	26	Treorchy	1	53	Runner-up
Zoe Jones	31	Halifax	1	53	3rd place
Cian Carrigan	23	Clonmel	1	53	4th place
Sîan Hamshaw	25	Barnsley	1	50	Evicted
Brooke Berry	21	London	1	50	Evicted
Tomasz Wania	31	Preston (originally from Poland)	1	43	Evicted
Lewis Flanagan	27	Stockton-on-Tees	1	43	Ejected
Isabella Farnese	23	Great Yarmouth	22	36	Evicted
Hussain Ahmed	25	Birmingham	22	36	Evicted
Kenaley Amos-Sissons	24	Nottingham	1	29	Evicted
Isaac Jagroop	23	Mildenhall	1	22	Evicted
Ksenia "Kay Lovelle" Lavrentieva	32	London (originally from Georgia)	1	19	Walked
Lewis Gregory	26	London	1	15	Evicted
Anamélia Silva	31	London (originally from Brazil)	1	8	Evicted
Ellis Hillon	19	Glasgow	1	2	Ejected

== Nominations table ==
	Week 1	Week 2	Week 3	Week 4	Week 5		Week 6	Final Week 7		Nominations received
	Week 1	Week 2	Week 3	Week 4	Day 31	Day 36	Week 6	Final Week 7		Nominations received
Cameron	No nominations	Kay, Kenaley	Kay, Akeem	Akeem, Kenaley	Hussain, Isabella	Isabella, Sîan	Lewis F, Tomasz	Winner (Day 53)		6
Akeem	No nominations	Lewis G, Lewis F	Isaac, Cameron	Lewis F, Cameron	Tomasz, Cameron	Lewis F, Isabella	Cameron, Sîan	Runner-up (Day 53)		16
Zoe	No nominations	Lewis G, Sîan	Sîan, Akeem	Sîan, Kenaley	Cian, Sîan	Akeem, Isabella	Brooke, Cameron	Third place (Day 53)		1
Cian	No nominations	Isaac, Lewis G	Isaac, Kay	Lewis F, Akeem	Tomasz, Hussain	Lewis F, Akeem	Zoe, Sîan	Fourth place (Day 53)		3
Sîan	No nominations	Lewis G, Tomasz	Kay, Lewis F	Lewis F, Akeem	Zoe, Hussain	Lewis F, Akeem	Brooke, Cian	Evicted (Day 50)		6
Brooke	No nominations	Lewis G, Lewis F	Kay, Tomasz	Lewis F, Akeem	Tomasz, Hussain	Isabella, Lewis F	Zoe, Lewis F	Evicted (Day 50)		3
Tomasz	No nominations	Lewis G, Lewis F	Akeem, Lewis F	Akeem, Lewis F	Cian, Brooke	Cian, Lewis F	Cameron, Zoe	Evicted (Day 43)		7
Lewis F	No nominations	Isaac, Lewis G	Isaac, Tomasz	Kenaley, Sîan	Hussain, Isabella	Tomasz, Akeem	Brooke, Cameron	Ejected (Day 43)		20
Isabella	Not in House			Exempt	Akeem, Brooke	Akeem, Brooke	Evicted (Day 36)			6
Hussain	Not in House			Exempt	Lewis F	Evicted (Day 36)				5
Kenaley	No nominations	Lewis G, Lewis F	Kay, Cameron	Lewis F, Akeem	Evicted (Day 29)					6
Isaac	No nominations	Lewis F, Kenaley	Kay, Akeem	Evicted (Day 22)						7
Kay	No nominations	Isaac, Cameron	Cameron, Isaac	Walked (Day 19)						7
Lewis G	No nominations	Lewis F, Kenaley	Evicted (Day 15)							8
Anamélia	No nominations	Evicted (Day 8)								N/A
Ellis	Ejected (Day 2)									N/A
Notes	1	2, 3	2	2, 4	2, 5	6	2, 7, 8	9		
Nominated (pre-save)	none	Isaac, Lewis F, Lewis G	Akeem, Brooke, Isaac, ~~Kay~~, Kenaley	Akeem, Kenaley, Lewis F	Hussain, Isabella, Lewis F, Tomasz	Akeem, Isabella, Lewis F	Akeem, Brooke, Cian, Sîan, Tomasz	none		
Gamechanger Winner	none	Kenaley	Kenaley	Lewis F	Isabella	Lewis F	Sîan	none		
Against public vote	Anamélia, Kay, Sîan	Lewis F, Lewis G	Akeem, Brooke, Isaac	Akeem, Kenaley	Hussain, Lewis F, Tomasz	none	Akeem, Cian, Tomasz	Akeem, Brooke, Cameron, Cian, Sîan, Zoe		
Ejected	Ellis	none					Lewis F	none		
Walked	none		Kay	none						
Evicted	Anamélia; Most votes to evict	Lewis G Most votes to evict	Isaac; Most votes to evict	Kenaley; Most votes to evict	Hussain; Most votes to evict	Isabella; Cameron's choice (out of 2) to evict	Tomasz; Most votes to evict	Brooke; Fewest votes (out of 6)	Zoe; Fewest votes (out of 4)	
Evicted	Anamélia; Most votes to evict	Lewis G Most votes to evict	Isaac; Most votes to evict	Kenaley; Most votes to evict	Hussain; Most votes to evict	Isabella; Cameron's choice (out of 2) to evict	Tomasz; Most votes to evict	Sîan; Fewest votes (out of 6)	Zoe; Fewest votes (out of 4)	
Evicted	Anamélia; Most votes to evict	Lewis G Most votes to evict	Isaac; Most votes to evict	Kenaley; Most votes to evict	Hussain; Most votes to evict	Isabella; Cameron's choice (out of 2) to evict	Tomasz; Most votes to evict	Sîan; Fewest votes (out of 6)	Akeem; Fewest votes (out of 2)	
Evicted	Anamélia; Most votes to evict	Lewis G Most votes to evict	Isaac; Most votes to evict	Kenaley; Most votes to evict	Hussain; Most votes to evict	Isabella; Cameron's choice (out of 2) to evict	Tomasz; Most votes to evict	Cian; Fewest votes (out of 4)	Akeem; Fewest votes (out of 2)	
Evicted	Anamélia; Most votes to evict	Lewis G Most votes to evict	Isaac; Most votes to evict	Kenaley; Most votes to evict	Hussain; Most votes to evict	Isabella; Cameron's choice (out of 2) to evict	Tomasz; Most votes to evict	Cameron; Most votes to win		

Notes

- ^Note 1: In the first week, there were no nominations. Instead, housemates were tasked with collecting "Big Coins". The three housemates with the fewest faced the public vote.
- ^Note 2: This housemate was nominated by the public, as they received the fewest votes in an app poll.
- ^Note 3: Week 2 introduced the Gamechanger. Each week, six Housemates participated in the Gamechanger Competition for the Gamechanger Power - the ability to save a nominee from eviction. The nominees and the richest housemate would be guaranteed to play, with the remaining slots being allocated by the richest housemate to the housemates of their choice.
- ^Note 4: As new housemates, Hussain and Isabella were exempt from the nomination process. Tomasz bought immunity at the weekly auction but could still nominate.
- ^Note 5: Hussain won the "Absolute Power Nomination" in a secret auction, and was, therefore, able to anonymously choose a housemate to face eviction. He nominated Lewis F, who was also ineligible to play in the Gamechanger and could not be saved by the gamechanger.
- ^Note 6: This week was a double eviction. Following the first eviction on Day 36, the remaining Housemates played a week's worth of Big Brother — including nominations (though housemates were not required to give a reason), the Gamechanger competition and ceremony during the remainder of the live eviction show, culminating in a second eviction for the night. Cameron, as the richest housemate, had immunity for this second eviction, as well as the power to evict either of the Final nominees (Akeem or Isabella) from the house.
- ^Note 7: This week was positive nominations. As such, housemates were nominating who they wanted to stay rather than leave. The housemates with the fewest nominations would be nominated.
- ^Note 8: Week 6 was the final week in which the Gamechanger Power was in play. Additionally, the Final Gamechanger had the power to save two nominees, as opposed to one.
- ^Note 9: There were no nominations in Week 7. Instead, the phone lines opened for the public to vote for the winner. The phone lines froze on Day 50, and the two housemates with the fewest votes were evicted.

== Weekly summary ==
The main events in the Big Brother 19 house are summarised in the table below. A typical week begins with nominations, followed by the shopping task, and then the eviction of a Housemate during the live Friday episode. Evictions, tasks, and other events for a particular week are noted in order of sequence.

Week 1	Entrances	On Day 1, Cian, Anamélia, Lewis F, Kenaley, Tomasz, Cameron, Sîan, Ellis, Isaac, Brooke, Akeem, Kay, Zoe and Lewis G entered the house.
Week 1	Twists	On Day 1, it was revealed that nominations will not take place for the first week. Instead, housemates would collect "Big Coins", and the three housemates with the least coins would face the public vote. Sîan received 100 coins from a Big Brother poll in the week leading-up to the launch. The same night, 900 coins were dropped from the ceiling for the housemates to collect.; It was also revealed during the launch that the housemate who sleeps in "Bed 13" would receive a special advantage; the chance to switch BigCoin totals with another housemate of her choice at the end of the task. Zoe won this power, and swapped coin totals with Lewis G.
Week 1	Exits	On Day 2, Ellis was removed from the house after old social media posts from 2014 came to light which producers of the show deemed to be "offensive and unacceptable that references the 9/11 terror attacks".; On Day 8, Anamélia became the first housemate to be evicted.
Week 2
Week 2	Nominations	On Day 10, housemates nominated for the first time. Lewis F and Lewis G received the most nominations this week. Unaware to the housemates, the public were voting to save. Issac being the one with fewest votes to save was nominated as well.
Week 2	Tasks	On Day 12, Kenaley won this week's Game Changer competition and saved Isaac from eviction.; This week's shopping task involved the housemates counting chickens - both real and fake - released in the house over two days. If housemates came within a margin of error of 35 from the actual total they would win a luxury shopping budget. Housemates failed this task.
Week 2	Punishments	On Day 9, Lewis G received a verbal warning for "cross-contaminating" food despite alarm being raised by Cameron and Akeem, and a formal warning for invading the personal space of Lewis F.; On Day 10, Isaac received a verbal warning for saying that he would "smack" Lewis G on the outside world.; On Day 13, as punishment for discussing nominations, Big Brother deducted 100 Big Coins from Lewis F's total.
Week 2	Exits	On Day 15, Lewis G became the second housemate to be evicted.
Week 3
Week 3	Nominations	On Day 17, housemates nominated for the second time. Akeem, Issac, and Kay received the most nominations. Brooke and Kenaley received the fewest votes from the public.
Week 3	Tasks	On Day 19, the nominated housemates, and Cian and Cameron took part in the Game changer task, which was a game of true or false based on their party from the previous night. Kenaley won this task and chose to save herself from eviction.; On Day 20, this week's shopping task began involving the housemates going on a 'trip' to China and completing a variety of tasks throughout the trip without surpassing the undisclosed number of fails allowed. Tasks involved understanding Mandarin, performing Chinese dances and surviving the flight to and from China. Housemates were successful in this task.
Week 3	Exits	In the early hours of Day 19, Kay decided to voluntarily leave the house.; On Day 22, Isaac became the third housemate to be evicted
Week 3	Entrances	On Day 22, Isabella and Hussain entered the house.
Week 4	Punishments	On Day 23, as punishment for discussing nominations, Big Brother deducted 100 Big Coins from Lewis F's total.
Week 4	Nominations	On Day 24, housemates nominated for the third time. New housemates Hussain and Isabella could not nominate or be nominated. Tomasz was also immune, having bought it at this week's auction. Akeem, and Lewis F received the most nominations, meaning they faced eviction alongside Kenaley who received the fewest votes in the viewer nomination poll.
Week 4	Tasks	On Day 26, the third Gamechanger took place, where housemates had to stack a line of dominos. Nominees, Akeem, Kenaley, and Lewis F took part alongside richest housemate Cian, and Zoe and Sîan. Lewis F won this task and saved himself from eviction.
Week 4	Exits	On Day 29, Kenaley became the fourth housemate to be evicted
Week 5
Week 5	Nominations	On Day 31, housemates nominated for the fourth time. Lewis F received the absolute nomination meaning he would automatically face the public vote and could not participate in this week's Gamechanger nor be saved. Hussain and Tomasz received the most nominations, meaning they'd face eviction alongside Isabella who received the fewest votes in the viewer nomination poll.; On Day 36, following Hussain's eviction, housemates instantly nominated once more in a "Week in a Day" twist. Akeem, Isabella and Lewis F received the most nominations and therefore faced eviction.
Week 5	Punishments	On Day 32, because of several housemates breaking fundamental rules of Big Brother, such as discussing nominations, ignoring Big Brother's instructions, and ignoring alarms, housemates were given basic rations and were without hot water or electrical appliances.; On Day 33, for discussing information from the outside world, Isabella was deducted 150 Big Coin from her total.
Week 5	Tasks	On Day 33, the fourth Gamechanger took place, where housemates had to hang on to a giant yoga ball. Nominees, Hussain, Isabella, and Lewis F took part alongside richest housemate Cameron, and Zoe and Tomasz. Isabella won this task and saved herself from eviction.
Week 5	Twists	On Day 36, immediately after Hussain's eviction, housemates were told they were going to take part in the "Week in a Day" twist. Housemates all nominated, and the fifth Gamechanger then took place where housemates had to unlock a series of three locks with keys to push a buzzer. Nominees, Akeem, Isabella, and Lewis F took part alongside richest housemate Cameron, and Zoe and Tomasz. Lewis F won this task and saved himself from eviction. As the housemate with the highest number of Big Coins, it was up to Cameron to decide who was to be evicted between Akeem and Isabella. He chose to evict Isabella.
Week 5	Exits	On Day 36, Hussain became the fifth housemate to be evicted.; Following the "Week in a Day" twist, on Day 36, Isabella became the sixth housemate to be evicted.
Week 6
Week 6	Nominations	On Day 38, housemates nominated for the sixth time. However, this week was positive nominations; meaning, that each housemate nominated who they would like to stay in the house rather than who they would like to see leave. Akeem and Cian received the fewest nominations therefore faced eviction, alongside Brooke, Sîan, and Tomasz who received the fewest votes in the viewer nomination poll.
Week 6	Punishments	On Day 39, as punishment for discussing nominations, Cian, Lewis F, and Zoe were chained together.
Week 6	Exits	On Day 43, Lewis F was removed from the house for unacceptable language that contravenes the rules. Whilst the incident did not air, Lewis himself later revealed the reason for his departure was because he accidentally said "Auschwitz" instead of "outfits" and he made an impression of Adolf Hitler.; On Day 43, Tomasz became the seventh housemate to be evicted.
Week 7
Week 7	Tasks	On Day 48, Big Brother "quit", leaving former housemates Josie Gibson, Kim Woodburn and Nikki Grahame in charge – before later returning that day.
Week 7	Exits	On Day 50, Brooke and Sîan became the eighth and ninth housemates to be evicted respectively.
Week 7	Exits	On Day 53, Cian and Zoe finished in fourth and third place respectively. The lines then opened one last time and Cameron was announced as the winner of the series, leaving Akeem as the runner-up.

== Big Coins ==
For this series, Big Coins were introduced to the housemates as house currency. Throughout the series, housemates were able to earn, steal and collect Big Coins in a number of tasks, which would ultimately give them power and the right to buy privileges.

	Place	1	2	3	4	5	6	7
Cameron	1	377	352	452	452	852	935	1623
Akeem	2	1167	892	592	592	592	12	112
Zoe	3	780	730	830	830	830	1047	1017
Cian	4	613	553	853	853	703	796	986
Sian	5	315	290	540	540	590	880	1080
Brooke	6	494	469	469	469	619	732	1732
Tomasz	7	589	779	739	690	0	288	
Lewis F	8	565	440	455	90	140	765	
Isabella	9				250	450		
Hussain	10				0	0		
Kenaley	11	371	346	546	546			
Isaac	12	772	722	501				
Kay	13	348	323	173				
Lewis G	14	404	379					
Anamélia	15	126						
Ellis	16							

=== Week 1 ===
- Ahead of the launch, the viewers were able to give one housemate an early advantage in the game by voting in a public vote for their favourite housemate based on just their occupation, age and home town. They chose "The Waitress" Sîan, who began the game with 100 Big Coins. On launch night, the housemates were told that they'd be competing against each other to collect Big Coins with the three poorest housemates ultimately facing the first eviction. Zoe, the occupant of Bed 13, was also given the secret power of swapping coin totals with another housemate of her choice, and chose Lewis G. At the end of the week, Anamélia, Kay and Sîan faced eviction. Following Anamélia's eviction, she decided to donate her coins to Tomasz.

=== Week 2 ===
- The second week featured housemates taking part in an auction, where they could bid for luxuries with their coins. With Akeem being the richest housemate at the time of nominations, he was able to take part in the Gamechanger task alongside the nominees and two housemates of his choice. As punishment for discussing nominations, Lewis F was deducted 100 Big Coins. Tomasz was also given the opportunity to secretly earn himself more coins by putting the luxury shopping task at risk. Following Lewis G's eviction, he decided to donate his coins to Isaac.

=== Week 3 ===
- The third week featured housemates going into the task room one by one where each housemate's stack of coins were shown. Each housemate had 90-seconds to decide where to distribute the coins by taking some from coins from a housemate's stack and placing them somewhere else. Another auction then took place where housemates could spend their coins. With Cian the richest housemate at the time, he was able to play the Gamechanger alongside the nominees. Following Isaac's eviction, he decided to donate his coins to Tomasz.

=== Week 4 ===
- The fourth week featured another auction where immunity from the next set of nominations was on offer. As punishment for discussing nominations, Lewis F was deducted 100 coins from his total. The housemates were told that they could give a 250 Big Coin advantage to one of the new housemates; Hussain or Isabella, who were currently bankrupt. They chose Isabella. However, Isabella was then asked which housemate she'd like to take the coins from, choosing Tomasz, the richest housemate at the time. With Cian being the richest housemate at the time of nominations, he was able to play the Gamechanger alongside the nominees. Following Kenaley's eviction, she decided to donate her coins to Hussain.

== Production ==
=== Creative team ===
Endemol confirmed that a new creative team had been formed ahead of the series. Paul Osborne, executive producer of Big Brother 7, returns to overlook the new series as Creative Director. Trevor Boris was also later hired as a senior producer after co-producing Big Brother Canada since its inception.

=== Eye logo ===
It was confirmed by creative director Paul Osborne that the series would have a "separate identity" from the Celebrity Big Brother 22. The eye was revealed on 4 September 2018, with Osborne commenting on its look of "a vast luminous orb of colours".

=== Cancellation ===
On 24 August 2018, while speaking at the Edinburgh International Television Festival, Channel 5 controller Ben Frow announced that he was planning for a year without the Big Brother franchise on Channel 5 in 2019, confirming that the current three-year contract expires at Christmas 2018. Frow had previously stated at the 2017 event that he'd be much happier with a channel without Big Brother on it. On 14 September 2018, Channel 5 confirmed that both Big Brother and Celebrity Big Brother had been axed and that this series would be "the end of the game".

== Ratings ==
Official ratings are taken from BARB.

	Viewers (millions)								
	Week 1		Week 2	Week 3	Week 4	Week 5	Week 6	Week 7	Week 8
Sunday		1.34	1.1	1.08	1.03	0.96	0.98	1.11	0.97
Monday		1.27	1.06	1.09	1.01	0.98	1.11	1.03	1.01
Tuesday		1.21	1.11	1.03	0.99	0.98	1.12	0.99	
Wednesday		1.19	1.08	1.05	0.96	0.98	1.11	0.97	
Thursday		1.24	1.1	1.14	0.96	0.99	1.11	1.0	
Friday	1.31	1.17	1.1	1.04	0.96	0.99	1.11	1.05	
Weekly average	1.25		1.09	1.07	0.99	0.98	1.09	1.03	0.99
Running average	1.25		1.18	1.14	1.1	1.08	1.08	1.07	1.07
Series average	1.07								
