= Freederm =

Brand of acne and skin care medication

- Industry: Skin care
- Headquarters: United Kingdom
- Products: Skin care, Cosmetics
- Website: www.freederm.co.uk

Freederm is a UK brand of acne and skin care medication manufactured by Diomed Developments Limited.

== Products ==
The products include Nicotinamide as an active ingredient, which is claimed by the company to be "clinically proven to help get rid of inflamed red spots".

== Sponsorship ==
The brand has been heavily involved in television sponsorship in recent years, sponsoring series 11 & 12 of reality television show Big Brother and its Celebrity and Ultimate spin-offs in a reported "multi-million pound deal". It was also the sponsor for the second series of ITV dating game show Take Me Out, and teenage vampire drama The Vampire Diaries.

== See also ==
- Clearasil
- Neutrogena
