= Marcus Bentley =

British actor, broadcaster and voice-over artist

- Born: 4 October 1967 (age 59); Darlington, County Durham, England
- Education: East 15 Acting School
- Occupations: Actor, voice-over artist, media personality, broadcaster, continuity announcer
- Years active: 1990s–present
- Employer(s): Channel 4 Channel 5 ITV2; ITV1
- Television: Big Brother
- Spouse: Jools Bentley (m. 1997)
- Children: 3

Marcus Bentley (born 4 October 1967) is a British actor, broadcaster and voice-over artist. Bentley is most known for narrating the British version of the Dutch reality television programme Big Brother since its inception in 2000. He also did other continuity announcements for Channel 4 until he left in July 2011 to continue narrating the revived Big Brother on Channel 5. Bentley's voice-over work and distinctive Geordie accent has led to him becoming one of Britain's most recognised voices.

Bentley has also appeared on stage and in London's Burning. Although he rarely makes public appearances, his public profile has been raised since Big Brother's revivals on Channel 5 and ITV.

== Early life ==
Bentley was born in Hurworth, near Grants house, and brought up in Stockton-on-Tees.

== Big Brother ==
Bentley was selected as the narrator of the Channel 4 (2000–2010), Channel 5 (2011–2018) and ITV2 (2023–) reality television programme Big Brother, which originated in the Netherlands, and this remains his best-known work. The producers of Big Brother gave him the job of narrator because they liked the way he said "Chickens". His most notable catchphrase is "Day [x] (in the Big Brother house...)". Bentley has narrated all twenty-one series of the show to date, as well as the spin-off shows Celebrity Big Brother, Teen Big Brother, Celebrity Hijack and Ultimate Big Brother.

== Other work ==
Before Big Brother, Bentley starred in several TV adaptations of Catherine Cookson's novels where he honed his now familiar Tyne and Wear accent. He also starred in several TV commercials as well as minor parts in feature films, such as Mad Dogs and Englishmen, which starred Joss Ackland, C. Thomas Howell, and Elizabeth Hurley.

In the Christmas special of Extras, Bentley voiced the narrator for Celebrity Big Brother.

Aside from Big Brother, Bentley could be heard on Channel 4 as a continuity announcer until he left after ten years, when he reprised his Big Brother narrator role on the revived Channel 5 series.

Another of Bentley's roles is the unseen question master on Sky One quiz show, Dirty Money.

=== Channel 5 ===
From December 2011, Bentley began doing continuity links on Channel 5, complementing his role as narrator of Big Brother on the same channel.

== Personal life ==
Bentley married his wife Jools in 1997. The couple have three children, and live in Kent.
