= Teen Big Brother: The Experiment =

Coordinates: 51°39′23″N 0°16′02″W

- Logo for Teen Big Brother: The Experiment
- Presented by: Dermot O'Leary
- No. of days: 10
- No. of housemates: 8
- Winner: Paul Brennan
- Runner-up: Caroline Cloke
- No. of episodes: 5

Release
- Original network: Channel 4
- Original release: 13 October – 17 October 2003

Additional information
- Filming dates: 30 July – 8 August 2003

Teen Big Brother: The Experiment also known as Teen Big Brother is a British reality television spin off of the show Big Brother where a group of teenagers lived in the Big Brother House for ten days. It was pre-recorded on 30 July - 8 August 2003 shortly after the fourth series of Big Brother ended and was aired on Channel 4 over five nights on 13–17 October 2003. The programme consisted of five episodes, each approximately 60 minutes long including adverts, with Elaine Hackett serving as executive producer for Endemol UK Productions. Channel 4 announced the series on 22 May 2003 for the broadcaster's educational division 4Learning with the aim of transmitting the series in late 2003 or early 2004. The series was controversial as some felt the broadcaster was exploiting the teenagers while the programme featured the first sexual act between two contestants in the history of the British adaptation of Big Brother.

The series followed a similar format to its parent show where the contestants, known as Housemates, lived inside a specially built compound known as the Big Brother House at Elstree Studios. The Housemates were constantly filmed during their time in the House and were not permitted to speak with those filming them. Due to the pre-recorded nature of the programme, the viewing public was unable to vote during evictions or to decide the winner; instead the Housemates did all the voting themselves during their time in the House. The Housemates competed to win a trip around the world worth £30,000 which was won by Paul Brennan after he was crowned the winner with a majority vote from his Housemates. Brennan chose to share his prize with Caroline Cloke, the runner-up.

== Format ==
The format was changed slightly from previous series of Big Brother. Housemates were incarcerated in the Big Brother House with no contact to and from the outside world. During their time in the House, the housemates took part in a compulsory task that determined the amount of money they were allocated to spend on their shopping; if they passed, they received a luxury budget and they were allocated a basic budget if they failed. Housemates were instructed to nominate two fellow Housemates for eviction. This compulsory vote was conducted in the privacy of the Diary Room and housemates were not allowed to discuss the nomination process or influence the nominations of others. The two or more housemates who gathered the most nominations were then nominated for eviction and the remaining Housemates that were safe from eviction had to decide which nominee would be evicted. On the final day the remaining Housemates voted for who they wanted to win Teen Big Brother. Housemates could voluntarily leave the House at any time and those who broke the rules could have been ejected by Big Brother. The teen Housemates were not allowed to have cigarettes or alcohol during their stay in the House.

== Housemates ==
All the Housemates in this edition were eighteen years old when they entered the Big Brother House.

| Name | Hometown | Day entered | Day exited | Result | Ref |
|---|---|---|---|---|---|
| Paul Brennan | Letterkenny, County Donegal, Ireland | 1 | 10 | Winner | |
| Caroline Cloke | Ashford, Kent | 1 | 10 | Runner-up | |
| Tracey Fowler | Cheshire | 1 | 10 | 3rd place | |
| Jade Dyer | Lowestoft | 1 | 10 | 4th place | |
| Tommy Wright | Weymouth, Dorset | 1 | 10 | 4th place | |
| James Kelly | Paisley, Glasgow | 1 | 10 | Disqualified | |
| Shaneen Dawkins | Leeds | 1 | 8 | Evicted | |
| Hasan Shah | London | 1 | 5 | Evicted | |

== Episodes ==
| No. overall | No. in series | Title | Days | Original release date | Filming dates | UK viewers (millions) |
|---|---|---|---|---|---|---|
| 1 | 1 | "Episode 1" | Days 1–2 | 13 October 2003 | 30–31 July 2003 | 2.5 |
Caroline, Hasan, Jade, James, Paul, Shaneen, Tommy, and Tracey entered the House on Day 1. As a test for the housemates, Big Brother blocked the toilet and the housemates had to unblock it themselves. For the rest of the first day the Housemates spent their day unpacking, relaxing and getting to know each other. The next day Big Brother set the teenagers their shopping task, that would determine their budget for the next eight days. The Housemates had to fully crew a simulated flight from London to Birmingham without crashing. Housemates gambled 75% of their shopping budget on the task. They failed the task as they crashed on landing.
| 2 | 2 | "Episode 2" | Days 3–4 | 14 October 2003 | 1–2 August 2003 | 2.8 |
Tensions are continuing to mount inside the House between the teenagers. They nominated for the first time on the third day but were unaware how Big Brother would carry out the eviction process. During nominations Hasan was undecided about his nominations and took a while in the Diary Room. Tommy and Tracey were reprimanded by Big Brother for discussing nominations. The following day, Big Brother announced Hasan and Shaneen received the most nominations from their fellow Housemates and would face eviction. All housemates were split into pairs and each person had to teach something personal to them to their partner in 5 hours. At the end of the 5 hours, Big Brother tested them on their new skills. The pairs were Shaneen/Caroline, Tommy/Hasan, Tracey/James and Paul/Jade. Everyone passed the task and they won two food hampers.: Note: This episode aired on E4 on 13 October 2003.
| 3 | 3 | "Episode 3" | Days 5–6 | 15 October 2003 | 3–4 August 2003 | 1.9 |
Big Brother called the non-nominated housemates into a separate room, where they would have to decide who between Hasan and Shaneen would be evicted. By an impromptu vote by 4 to 2 suggested by Tracey, Hasan was the first housemate to be evicted from the Teen Big Brother House on Day 5 with Tracey and Tommy being the only votes to evict Shaneen. The following day Big Brother provided every housemate with a boiler suit and they were only allowed to wear this suit and underwear. Housemates were also only allowed a toothbrush, one toothpaste and a bottle of shower gel each until further notice. The reasoning for this was because at 18, the housemates's personalities are defined by what they wear.: During the day, Big Brother set housemates a series of mini-tasks to challenge gender stereotypes. Housemates would be eliminated if they lost their match and in the end there would be one winner of the task.; 1. Tracey and James played a game of basketball to challenge their aim and accuracy. James theoretically should have won due to the stereotype, but Tracey won the game.; 2. Tracey and Jade were challenged to build a tower of building blocks, with the tallest tower winning. Jade won and picked Tommy to challenge her in the next round.; 3. Jade and Tommy had to play a game of tag. Jade won the game.; 4. Caroline defeated Jade in a test of awareness but the details of this task are unknown, other than it involved watching something on the plasma screen.; 5. In the final challenge, Caroline faced Paul at answering a series of questions to get the combinations of a number of safes. Caroline was able to open the most safes, winning the task and the reward, which was to be pampered by her fellow housemates with various beauty products and exemption from the eviction process in the next round of nominations.; After the Housemates went to bed Tommy and Jade shared a bed and had sex under the covers and were the first Housemates to do so in the British Big Brother House.: Note: This episode aired on E4 on 14 October 2003. The scene between Tommy and Jade was omitted from the version that aired during Channel 4's 4Learning block in January 2004.
| 4 | 4 | "Episode 4" | Days 7–8 | 16 October 2003 | 5–6 August 2003 | 2.4 |
Tommy and Jade deal with the aftermath of the previous night with both feeling they shouldn't have had sex. Elaine Hackett, the executive producer, broke with the programme's usual format and addressed Tommy and Jade directly in the Diary Room providing them comfort. The teenagers were provided medical and professional counseling after the incident. Big Brother gave the Housemates back their personal belongings and they changed out of their boiler suits. The Housemates were gathered on the sofas to nominate for a second time. Big Brother informed each Housemate privately in the Diary Room the process had changed. Each Housemate had to choose someone to save from eviction, and the Housemate with the fewest votes would be evicted. The following day the Housemates had to paint a group portrait to test their interpretation skills. Shaneen was the second Housemate evicted from the Teen Big Brother House after receiving no votes to save in the nominations.: Note: This episode aired on E4 on 15 October 2003.
| 5 | 5 | "Episode 5" | Days 9–10 | 17 October 2003 | 7–8 August 2003 | 2.0 |
On the morning of Day 9, Big Brother ordered the Housemates to clean the House thoroughly. In the afternoon, Housemates were required to form a pop group and write and perform a song in Spanish. Housemates passed this task and won a party. On the final day James was disqualified from winning because he had received three official warnings from Big Brother. Big Brother allowed him to stay until the end and vote for the winner, since it was the last day. Paul became the first winner of Teen Big Brother: The Experiment, receiving an all expense paid trip around the world worth £30,000. Caroline was the runner-up with Tracey in third place while Jade and Tommy tied for fourth and fifth place. Big Brother asked Paul to come to the Diary Room and choose another housemate to share the prize, he chose Caroline. Shortly after the final six Housemates exit the Teen Big Brother House.: Note: This episode aired on E4 on 16 October 2003.

== Nomination and voting history ==
| | Day 3 | Day 5 | Day 7 | Day 10 | | Nominations received |
| | Day 3 | Day 5 | Day 7 | Vote | Result | Nominations received |
|---|---|---|---|---|---|---|
| Paul | Tracey, Hasan | Hasan | Jade | Caroline | Winner (Day 10) | 3 |
| Caroline | Paul, Jade | Hasan | Exempt | Paul | Runner-up (Day 10) | 0 |
| Tracey | Paul, Shaneen | Shaneen | Tommy | Paul | Third place (Day 10) | 2 |
| Jade | Hasan, Tommy | Hasan | Paul | Paul | Fourth place (Day 10) | 2 |
| Tommy | Jade, Shaneen | Shaneen | Tracey | Tracey | Fourth place (Day 10) | 1 |
| James | Hasan, Shaneen | Hasan | Tommy | Caroline | Disqualified (Day 10) | 0 |
| Shaneen | Hasan, Tracey | Nominated | James | Evicted (Day 8) | | 6 |
| Hasan | Shaneen, Paul | Nominated | Evicted (Day 5) | | | 8 |
| Notes | 1 | 2 | 3, 4 | 5 | | |
| Up for eviction | none | Hasan, Shaneen | Jade, James, Paul, Shaneen, Tommy, Tracey | Caroline, Jade, Paul, Tommy, Tracey | | |
| Disqualified | none | | | James | | |
| Evicted | Shaneen; 8 of 16 votes to nominate | Hasan; 4 of 6 votes to evict | Shaneen; 0 of 6 votes to save | Jade; 0 votes to win | Tommy; 0 votes to win | |
| Evicted | Shaneen; 8 of 16 votes to nominate | Hasan; 4 of 6 votes to evict | Shaneen; 0 of 6 votes to save | Tracey; 1 vote to win | | |
| Evicted | Hasan; 8 of 16 votes to nominate | Hasan; 4 of 6 votes to evict | Shaneen; 0 of 6 votes to save | Caroline; 2 votes to win | | |
| Evicted | Hasan; 8 of 16 votes to nominate | Hasan; 4 of 6 votes to evict | Shaneen; 0 of 6 votes to save | Paul; 3 votes to win | | |

Notes

- ^Note 1: Housemates were required to nominate two housemates for eviction.
- ^Note 2: As Hasan and Shaneen received the most nominations on Day 3, the housemates had to vote for either Hasan or Shaneen to evict on Day 5.
- ^Note 3: Each housemate had to choose someone to save from eviction, and the housemate with the fewest votes was evicted.
- ^Note 4: Caroline was exempt from nominating and immune from eviction after winning a task.
- ^Note 5: Each housemate was asked to vote for who they wanted to win. James was disqualified from winning, although he could still vote. Big Brother asked Paul, who was the winner, to choose another housemate to share the prize, he chose Caroline.

== Production ==
Channel 4 announced it had commissioned Teen Big Brother: The Experiment from Endemol UK Productions shortly prior to the launch of the fourth series of Big Brother. The programme was part of an effort to produce educational programming that was aimed at a young adult market. The programme was revealed by Heather Rabbatts from Channel 4's educational division, 4Learning, at the World Education Market in Lisbon. The audition process used to select the Housemates was similar to the one Endemol used in the past for Big Brother. Elaine Hackett served as the executive producer for the series while Marcus Bentley returned to narrate the series. In a change Dermot O'Leary, host of Big Brother's Little Brother presented the series instead of Davina McCall.

=== Broadcast ===
The main television coverage for Teen Big Brother was screened during five episodes, each approximately 60 minutes long including adverts, on Channel 4 from 13 October to 17 October 2003 at 10pm. E4 previewed each episode a day before they were transmitted on Channel 4. Due to the pre-recorded nature of the programme there was no live streaming or any spin-off shows that aired during the original broadcast. The show was later re-aired as part of Channel 4's 4Learning programme block in January 2004.

== Controversy and criticism ==
The series attracted criticism for Channel 4 after the press began to report about two of the Housemates having sex inside the House. The Learning and Skills Council gave Channel 4 advice as part of its work enhance education contents of their programmes which included Teen Big Brother. In an interview with The Guardian in September 2003, Channel 4 confirmed that incident would not air as part of its 4Learning educational arm but references to the incident would not be cut out. At the time Channel 4 had not confirmed any other plans for the programme. After the broadcaster decided to show Teen Big Brother in primetime it began receiving criticism from the media. The episode which featured the incident was watched by 1.9 million viewers on Channel 4 and was the lowest rated out of all five. A Channel 4 spokeswoman said "the broadcaster was happy with the show's ratings."

== See also ==
- Pinoy Big Brother: Teen Edition
