= List of Big Brother (British TV series) housemates =

Since Big Brother began in 2000, there have been a total of 392 civilian, 10 Panto, 8 teen, 12 Celebrity Hijack and 14 ultimate housemates; 186 men and 206 women. There have been 22 winners of Big Brother; 13 men and 9 women. The first male winner was Craig Phillips in Big Brother 1 and the first female winner was Kate Lawler in Big Brother 3. The youngest winner is Cameron Cole, who was 19 at the time of winning Big Brother 19, and the oldest winner is Richard Storry, who was 60 when he won Big Brother 22.

A total of 326 housemates have been evicted, 16 housemates have been ejected, and 26 housemates have walked from the Big Brother house, whilst Andrew Cruickshanks who competed in Big Brother 18 left the house during the final after becoming the winning "Second Chance" housemate. Farida Khalifa is the only housemate to compete in two separate civilian series, on Big Brother 20 and Big Brother 22 respectively. Only one housemate, Nikki Grahame, has been voted back into the house after being evicted. Grahame, Jade Goody, Nick Bateman and Victor Ebuwa are the only housemates to appear on three different series' of the show. Goody is, to date, the only housemate to have competed in both Big Brother and Celebrity Big Brother, as well as appearing in Big Brother Panto. Furthermore Goody and Grahame are the only housemates to compete on international versions of the show, appearing on Big Boss 2 and Big Brother Canada 4 in 2008 and 2016 respectively. In 2010, Big Brother 2 winner Brian Dowling was crowned Ultimate Champion over the first 11 series of Big Brother on Channel 4. The show was revived on Channel 5 in 2011, and ran for a further eight series until it was axed in 2018. More contestants began competing in the series when the programme was revived for the second time on ITV2 in 2023.

== Housemates ==
Key

Winner
Runner-up
Third place
Walked
Ejected
Left
Participating

Series	Name	Age (Note: Ages at the time the housemate entered the house)	Nationality	Hometown	Occupation (Note: Occupation at the time the housemate entered the house)	Status
1	Sada Walkington	28	Scotland	Edinburgh	Writer	11th - Evicted
1	Andrew Davidson	23	England	Hertfordshire	Marketing product manager	10th - Evicted
1	Caroline O'Shea	37	England	Birmingham	Marital aids seller	9th - Evicted
1	Nick Bateman	32	England	Kent	Broker	8th - Ejected
1	Nichola Holt	28	England	Bolton	Teacher	7th - Evicted
1	Tom McDermott	31	Northern Ireland	County Tyrone	Farmer	6th - Evicted
1	Claire Strutton	25	England	Buckinghamshire	Florist	5th - Evicted
1	Melanie Hill	26	England	London	Computer saleswoman	4th - Evicted
1	Darren Ramsay	23	England	London	Millennium Dome assistant	3rd - Third place
1	Anna Nolan	29	Ireland	Dublin	Office manager	2nd - Runner-up
1	Craig Phillips	28	England	Liverpool	Builder	1st - Winner
2	Penny Ellis	33	England	London	Teacher	11th - Evicted
2	Stuart Hosking	36	England	Oxford	Director of communications company	10th - Evicted
2	Narinder Kaur	28	England	Leicester	Medical rep	9th - Evicted
2	Paul "Bubble" Ferguson	24	England	Surrey	Warehouse operative	8th - Evicted
2	Amma Antwi-Agyei	23	England	London	Table dancer	7th - Evicted
2	Josh Rafter	32	England	London	Property manager	6th - Evicted
2	Paul Clarke	25	England	Reading	CAD designer	5th - Evicted
2	Elizabeth Woodcock	26	England	Cumbria	Website designer	4th - Evicted
2	Dean O'Loughlin	37	England	Birmingham	Self-employed internet company manager	3rd - Third Place
2	Helen Adams	22	Wales	South Wales	Hairdresser	2nd - Runner-up
2	Brian Dowling	22	Ireland	County Kildare	Air steward	1st - Winner
3	Sunita Sharma	25	England	London	Trainee barrister	14th - Walked
3	Lynne Moncrieff	36	Scotland	Aberdeen	Student	13th - Evicted
3	Alison Hammond	27	England	Birmingham	Cinema team leader	12th - Evicted
3	Sandy Cumming	43	Scotland	London	Personal shopper/stylist	11th - Walked
3	Lee Davey	21	England	Leicester	Fitness instructor	10th - Evicted
3	Spencer Smith	22	England	Cambridge	Ski shop assistant	9th - Evicted
3	Sophie Pritchard	24	England	Buckinghamshire	Recruitment consultant	8th - Evicted
3	Adele Roberts	23	England	Southport	PA/DJ	7th - Evicted
3	PJ Ellis	22	England	Birmingham	Student	6th - Evicted
3	Tim Culley	23	England	Worcester	Tennis coach	5th - Evicted
3	Jade Goody	20	England	London	Dental nurse	4th - Evicted
3	Alex Sibley	23	England	London	Model	3rd - Third Place
3	Jonny Regan	29	England	County Durham	Firefighter	2nd - Runner-up
3	Kate Lawler	22	England	London	Technical support administrator	1st - Winner
4	Anouska Golebiewski	20	England	Manchester	Nursery assistant	13th - Evicted
4	Justine Sellman	27	England	Leeds	Sales assistant	12th - Evicted
4	Sissy Rooney	26	England	Liverpool	Store assistant	11th - Evicted
4	Federico Martone	23	Scotland	Glasgow	Waiter	10th - Evicted
4	Jon Tickle	29	England	Surrey	Unemployed	9th - Evicted
4	Tania do Nascimento	22	England	London	Shop assistant	8th - Evicted
4	Gos Gosal	31	England	London	Chef	7th - Evicted
4	Lisa Jeynes	35	Wales	South Wales	Shop manager	6th - Evicted
4	Nush Nowak	23	England	Worcester	Fine art student	5th - Evicted
4	Steph Coldicott	28	England	Worcester	Visual merchandiser	4th - Evicted
4	Scott Turner	27	England	Liverpool	Waiter	3rd - Third Place
4	Ray Shah	25	Ireland	Dublin	IT systems administrator	2nd - Runner-up
4	Cameron Stout	32	Scotland	Orkney	Fish trader	1st - Winner
5	Kitten Pinder	24	England	Brighton	Anarchist/human and animal rights activist	13th - Ejected
5	Emma Greenwood	20	England	Manchester	Administrative assistant	12th - Ejected
5	Vanessa Nimmo	26	South Africa	Leeds	Archery champion	11th - Evicted
5	Marco Sabba	21	England	Middlesex	Student	10th - Evicted
5	Becki Seddiki	33	Morocco	London	Singer/songwriter	9th - Evicted
5	Ahmed Aghil	44	Somalia	Liverpool	Property developer	8th - Evicted
5	Victor Ebuwa	23	England	London	Singer/songwriter	7th - Evicted
5	Michelle Bass	23	England	Newcastle	Mortgage advisor	6th - Evicted
5	Stuart Wilson	20	England	Cheshire	Student	5th - Evicted
5	Shell Jubin	22	England	Glasgow	Student	4th - Evicted
5	Daniel Bryan	30	England	Hull	Hairdresser	3rd - Third Place
5	Jason Cowan	30	Scotland	South Lanarkshire	Air steward	2nd - Runner-up
5	Nadia Almada	27	Portugal	London	Store assistant	1st - Winner
6	Mary O'Leary	30	Ireland	Dublin	Psychic advisor/writer/white witch	16th - Evicted
6	Lesley Sanderson	19	England	Huddersfield	Sales assistant	15th - Evicted
6	Sam Heuston	23	England	London	Student	14th - Evicted
6	Roberto Conte	32	Italy	Liverpool	Teacher	13th - Evicted
6	Saskia Howard-Clarke	23	England	London	Promotions girl	12th - Evicted
6	Maxwell Ward	24	England	London	Maintenance engineer	11th - Evicted
6	Vanessa Layton-McIntosh	19	England	London	Student	10th - Evicted
6	Kieron "Science" Harvey	22	England	Leeds	Entertainment entrepreneur	9th - Evicted
6	Kemal Shahin	19	Turkey	London	Student/male belly dancer	8th - Evicted
6	Orlaith McAllister	26	Northern Ireland	Belfast	Student/model	7th - Walked
6	Derek Laud	40	England	London	Speech writer	6th - Evicted
6	Craig Coates	20	England	Norfolk	Hair stylist	5th - Evicted
6	Kinga Karolczak	20	Poland	London	Market researcher	4th - Evicted
6	Makosi Musambasi	24	Zimbabwe	Buckinghamshire	Cardiac nurse	3rd - Third Place
6	Eugene Sully	27	England	Crawley	Student	2nd - Runner-up
6	Anthony Hutton	23	England	Newcastle	70s dancer	1st - Winner
7	Shahbaz Chauhdry	37	Scotland	Glasgow	Unemployed	22nd - Walked
7	Dawn Blake	38	England	Birmingham	Exercise scientist	21st - Ejected
7	Bonnie Holt	20	England	Loughborough	Care worker	20th - Evicted
7	George Askew	19	England	London	Student	19th - Walked
7	Sezer Yurtseven	26	North Cyprus	London	Stock broker/property developer	18th - Evicted
7	Sam Brodie	19	Scotland	Ayr	Nail technician	17th - Evicted
7	Grace Adams-Short	20	England	London	Dance teacher	16th - Evicted
7	Lisa Huo	27	China	Manchester	Upholsterer	15th - Evicted
7	Jonathan Leonard	24	England	Cumbria	Doorman	14th - Evicted
7	Lea Walker	35	England	Nottingham	Porn star/model	13th - Evicted
7	Jayne Kitt	36	England	Berkshire	Recruitment adviser	12th - Evicted
7	Michael Cheshire	23	England	Manchester	Student	11th - Evicted
7	Spiral Coroner	22	Ireland	Dublin	DJ/rapper	10th - Evicted
7	Mikey Dalton	22	England	Liverpool	Software developer/model	9th - Evicted
7	Susie Verrico	43	England	Kent	Model	8th - Evicted
7	Imogen Thomas	23	Wales	Llanelli	Bar hostess	7th - Evicted
7	Jennie Corner	18	England	Liverpool	Barmaid/student	6th - Evicted
7	Nikki Grahame	24	England	London	Model/dancer	5th - Evicted
7	Richard Newman	33	Canada	Northampton	Waiter	4th - Evicted
7	Aisleyne Horgan-Wallace	27	England	London	Model/promotions girl	3rd - Third Place
7	Glyn Wise	18	Wales	North Wales	Student/lifeguard	2nd - Runner-up
7	Pete Bennett	24	England	Brighton	Singer	1st - Winner
8	Emily Parr	19	England	Bristol	Student	22nd - Ejected
8	Lesley Brain	60	England	Gloucestershire	Retired headhunter	21st - Walked
8	Shabnam Paryani	22	England	London	Receptionist	20th - Evicted
8	Seány O'Kane	25	Northern Ireland	Derry	Charity worker	19th - Evicted
8	Billi Bhatti	25	England	London	Model	18th - Evicted
8	Jonathan Durden	49	England	London	Entrepreneur	17th - Walked
8	Laura Williams	23	Wales	South Wales	Nanny	16th - Evicted
8	Nicky Maxwell	27	India	Hertfordshire	Bank worker	15th - Evicted
8	Charley Uchea	21	England	London	Unemployed	14th - Evicted
8	Chanelle Hayes	19	England	Wakefield	Student	13th - Walked
8	Shanessa Reilly	26	Wales	Cardiff	Care assistant/stripper	12th - Evicted
8	David Parnaby	25	Scotland	Ayr	Visual manager	11th - Evicted
8	Amy Alexandra	21	England	Grimsby	Glamour model	10th - Evicted
8	Gerry Stergiopoulos	31	Greece	London	Gallery researcher	9th - Evicted
8	Tracey Barnard	36	England	Cambridge	Cleaner	8th - Evicted
8	Kara-Louise Horne	22	England	London	Student	7th - Evicted
8	Jonty Stern	36	England	London	Museum assistant	6th - Evicted
8	Carole Vincent	53	England	London	Sexual health worker	5th - Evicted
8	Ziggy Lichman	26	England	London	Model	4th - Evicted
8	Liam McGough	22	England	County Durham	Tree surgeon	3rd - Third Place
8	Amanda Marchant	18	England	Stoke-on-Trent	Student	2nd - Runner-up
8	Sam Marchant	18	England	Stoke-on-Trent	Student	2nd - Runner-up
8	Brian Belo	19	Nigeria	Essex	Data clerk	1st - Winner
9	Stephanie McMichael	19	England	Liverpool	Student	21st - Evicted
9	Alexandra De-Gale	23	England	Surrey	Accounts clerk	20th - Ejected
9	Dennis McHugh	23	Scotland	Edinburgh	Dance teacher	19th - Ejected
9	Sylvia Barrie	21	Sierra Leone	London	Student	18th - Evicted
9	Jennifer Clark	22	England	County Durham	Model	17th - Evicted
9	Mario Marconi	43	England	Cheshire	Civil servant	16th - Evicted
9	Belinda Harris-Reid	44	Uganda	Exeter	Theatre director	15th - Evicted
9	Rebecca Shiner	21	England	Coventry	Nursery nurse	14th - Evicted
9	Maysoon Shaladi	28	Syria	Hertfordshire	Model	13th - Walked
9	Luke Marsden	20	England	Bolton	Student	12th - Evicted
9	Dale Howard	21	England	Liverpool	Student/part time DJ	11th - Evicted
9	Stuart Pilkington	25	England	Manchester	Personal trainer/property developer	10th - Evicted
9	Nicole Cammack	19	England	Surrey	Student	9th - Evicted
9	Lisa Appleton	40	England	Cheshire	Beauty and tanning sales rep	8th - Evicted
9	Mohamed Mohamed	23	Somalia	London	Toy demonstrator	7th - Evicted
9	Kathreya Kasisopa	30	Thailand	Kent	Massage therapist	6th - Evicted
9	Darnell Swallow	26	United States	Suffolk	Songwriter	5th - Evicted
9	Rex Newmark	24	England	London	Chef	4th - Evicted
9	Sara Folino	27	Australia	London	Personal assistant	3rd - Third Place
9	Mikey Hughes	33	Scotland	Glasgow	Radio producer	2nd - Runner-up
9	Rachel Rice	24	Wales	Torfaen	Trainee teacher/actress	1st - Winner
10	Beinazir Lasharie	28	Pakistan	London	Receptionist	22nd - Evicted
10	Saffia Corden	27	England	Nottingham	Dental nurse	21st - Walked
10	Sophia Brown	26	England	London	Private banking assistant	20th - Evicted
10	Cairon Austin-Hill	18	United States	London	Student	19th - Evicted
10	Angel McKenzie	35	Russia	London	Professional boxer	18th - Evicted
10	Sree Desari	25	India	Hertfordshire	Student union president	17th - Evicted
10	Kris Donnelly	24	England	Manchester	Visual merchandiser	16th - Evicted
10	Karly Ashworth	21	Scotland	Fife	Unemployed/model	15th - Evicted
10	Kenneth Tong	24	Canada	Edinburgh	Self-employed	14th - Walked
10	Tom Oliver	27	England	Northampton	Yacht importer	13th - Walked
10	Noirin Kelly	25	Ireland	Dublin	Retail manager	12th - Evicted
10	Isaac Stout	23	United States	Ohio, United States	Bar manager	11th - Walked
10	Hira Habibshah	25	Pakistan	Dublin	Fashion designer	10th - Evicted
10	Freddie Fisher	23	England	Shropshire	Web programmer	9th - Evicted
10	Bea Hamill	24	England	Bristol	Recruitment consultant	8th - Evicted
10	Marcus Akin	35	England	London	Carpenter/glazier	7th - Evicted
10	Lisa Wallace	41	England	Birmingham	Unemployed	6th - Evicted
10	Rodrigo Lopes	23	Brazil	Manchester	Student	5th - Evicted
10	Charlie Drummond	22	England	Newcastle	Employment agency advisor	4th - Evicted
10	David Ramsden	28	England	Dewsbury	Clothing recycler	3rd - Third Place
10	Siavash Sabbaghpour	23	Iran	London	Event organiser/stylist/model	2nd - Runner-up
10	Sophie Reade	20	England	Cheshire	Model	1st - Winner
11	Rachael White	25	England	Nottingham	Hair stylist	21st - Evicted
11	Govan Hinds	21	England	Leicester	Voluntary worker	20th - Evicted
11	Sunshine Martyn	24	England	Peterborough	Medical student	19th - Evicted
11	Shabby Katchadourian	24	England	London	Film maker	18th - Walked
11	Nathan Dunn	25	England	Bradford	Joiner	17th - Evicted
11	Ife Kuku	25	England	Milton Keynes	Dancer	16th - Evicted
11	Caoimhe Guilfoyle	22	Ireland	Dublin	DJ	15th - Walked
11	Keeley Johnson	30	England	Manchester	Travel agency manager	14th - Walked
11	Laura McAdam	20	England	Warwickshire	Sales assistant	13th - Walked
11	Ben Duncan	30	England	London	Writer and broadcaster	12th - Evicted
11	Rachel Ifon	28	England	Liverpool	Flight attendant	11th - Evicted
11	Jo Butler	41	England	Luton	Makeup artist	10th - Evicted
11	Steve Gill	40	England	Leicester	Unemployed	9th - Evicted
11	Corin Forshaw	29	England	Manchester	Retail worker	8th - Evicted
11	Sam Pepper	21	England	Kent	Graffiti artist	7th - Evicted
11	John James Parton	24	Australia	Melbourne, Australia	Vehicle bodybuilder	6th - Evicted
11	Andrew Edmonds	19	England	Dorset	Student	5th - Evicted
11	JJ Bird	23	England	London	Professional boxer/barman	4th - Evicted
11	Mario Mugan	28	Italy	Essex	Unemployed	3rd - Third Place
11	Dave Vaughan	39	Wales	Torfaen	Minister	2nd - Runner-up
11	Josie Gibson	25	England	Bristol	Financial sales rep	1st - Winner
12	Tashie Jackson	21	England	Oxford	Singer/actress	15th - Evicted
12	Rebeckah Vaughan	28	England	Wirral	Hostess/entrepreneur	14th - Evicted
12	Heaven Afrika	30	England	London	Model/holistic healer	13th - Evicted
12	Mark Henderson	28	England	London	Sales	12th - Walked
12	Maisy James	19	England	Kent	Store assistant	11th - Evicted
12	Aden Theobald	19	England	London	Student	10th - Evicted
12	Anton Murphy	23	England	London	Musician	9th - Evicted
12	Jemma Palmer	28	England	Tamworth	Professional wrestler	8th - Walked
12	Harry Blake	23	England	Cheshire	Marketing director/business investor	7th - Evicted
12	Faye Palmer	22	England	Tamworth	Professional wrestler	6th - Evicted
12	Tom O'Connell	20	England	Birmingham	Sales assistant	5th - Evicted
12	Louise Cliffe	25	England	Manchester	Model/actress	4th - Evicted
12	Alex Lee	18	England	Newcastle	McDonald's staff member	3rd - Third Place
12	Jay McKray	27	England	Newcastle	Plumber/fitness instructor/DJ/barber	2nd - Runner-up
12	Aaron Allard-Morgan	30	England	Weston-super-Mare	Contract manager	1st - Winner
13	Victoria Eisermann	41	England	Reading	Model/animal rights campaigner	17th - Evicted
13	Chris James	21	England	Luton	Doorman	16th - Evicted
13	Benedict Garrett	32	England	Manchester	Stripper/porn star	15th - Evicted
13	Lydia Louisa	25	England	Cheshire	Dancer	14th - Evicted
13	Arron Lowe	23	England	Manchester	Model	13th - Evicted
13	Shievonne Robinson	28	England	London	Shop assistant manager	12th - Evicted
13	Lauren Carre	20	Jersey	Jersey	Student	11th - Evicted
13	Caroline Wharram	20	England	London	Unemployed	10th - Evicted
13	Becky Hannon	19	England	Blackburn	Student	9th - Evicted
13	Conor McIntyre	24	Northern Ireland	Derry	Personal trainer	8th - Walked
13	Scott Mason	21	England	Cheshire	Student	7th - Evicted
13	Ashleigh Hughes	20	England	Essex	Retail sales supervisor	6th - Evicted
13	Luke Scrase	24	England	Stoke-on-Trent	Nightclub promoter	5th - Evicted
13	Sara McLean	22	Scotland	Edinburgh	Student/model	4th - Evicted
13	Deana Uppal	23	India	Sandwell	Model	3rd - Third Place
13	Adam Kelly	27	United States	Dudley	Unemployed	2nd - Runner-up
13	Luke Anderson	31	South Africa	North Wales	Development chef	1st - Winner
14	Sallie Axl	26	England	Wirral	Glamour model	14th - Evicted
14	Jemima Slade	41	England	London	Dating website owner	13th - Evicted
14	Wolfy Millington	20	England	Bolton	Student	12th - Evicted
14	Daley Ojuederie	28	England	London	Professional boxer	11th - Ejected
14	Jackie Travers	59	England	Hertfordshire	Dance instructor	10th - Evicted
14	Dan Neal	33	England	London	Unemployed	9th - Evicted
14	Callum Knell	28	England	Kent	Sports coach	8th - Evicted
14	Hazel O'Sullivan	24	Ireland	Dublin	Glamour model	7th - Evicted
14	Sophie Lawrence	20	England	London	Dental nurse	6th - Evicted
14	Charlie Travers	26	England	Hertfordshire	Receptionist	5th - Evicted
14	Jack and Joe Glenny	18	England	Hertfordshire	Supermarket checkout assistants	4th - Evicted
14	Gina Rio	24	England	London	Socialite	3rd - Third Place
14	Dexter Koh	28	Singapore	London	Celebrity publicist	2nd - Runner-up
14	Sam Evans	23	Wales	Llanelli	Stockroom assistant	1st - Winner
15	Tamara Stewart-Wood	24	England	London	Oil and gas headhunter	19th - Evicted
15	Pauline Bennett	49	England	Wolverhampton	Dance teacher	18th - Evicted
15	Toya Washington	29	Nigeria	London	Blogger	17th - Evicted
15	Matthew Davies	23	England	Hertfordshire	Media graduate	16th - Evicted
15	Jale Karaturp	33	England	Surrey	Customer adviser	15th - Evicted
15	Marlon Wallen	22	England	Croydon	Optics worker	14th - Evicted
15	Biannca Lake	31	England	Chigwell	Stripper/exotic dancer	13th - Evicted
15	Danielle McMahon	25	Scotland	Glasgow	Model	12th - Evicted
15	Kimberly Kisselovich	23	United States	California	Businesswoman	11th - Walked
15	Steven Goode	23	England	Bushey	Managing director	10th - Evicted
15	Zoe Birkett	29	England	Durham	Musical theatre singer	9th - Evicted
15	Mark Byron	24	England	Liverpool	Visual merchandiser	8th - Evicted
15	Winston Showan	27	England	Brentwood	Development manager	7th - Evicted
15	Pav Paul	22	England	Ilford	Property business manager	6th - Evicted
15	Chris Wright	33	England	New Forest	Actor	5th - Evicted
15	Ash Harrison	26	England	Manchester	Model	4th - Evicted
15	Christopher Hall	23	Northern Ireland	Enniskillen	Journalist	3rd - Third place
15	Ashleigh Coyle	18	Northern Ireland	Derry	Boutique shop worker	2nd - Runner-up
15	Helen Wood	27	England	Bolton	Beautician	1st - Winner
16	Adjoa Mensah	22	Netherlands	Manchester	Student	18th - Evicted
16	Aaron Frew	24	England	Northampton	Model	17th - Ejected
16	Amy and Sally Broadbent	27	England	Manchester	Nightclub host and personal trainer	16th - Evicted
16	Harriet Jackson	22	England	London	Café worker	15th - Evicted
16	Kieran McLeod	30	England	Birmingham	Radio presenter	14th - Evicted
16	Sarah Greenwood	24	England	Manchester	Student	13th - Evicted
16	Eileen Daly	51	England	London	Singer	12th - Evicted
16	Jade-Martina Lynch	24	Ireland	Dublin	Model and student	11th - Evicted
16	Simon Gross	46	England	Kent	Theatre company owner	10th - Evicted
16	Marc O'Neill	29	Ireland	Kildare	Stripper and student	9th - Evicted
16	Harry Amelia Martin	22	England	Loughborough	Model	8th - Evicted
16	Sam Kay	27	Scotland	Cardiff	Personal trainer	7th - Evicted
16	Cristian MJC	20	England	London	Model and student	6th - Evicted
16	Nick Henderson	19	England	Hertford	Unemployed	5th - Evicted
16	Jack McDermott	23	England	Plymouth	Floor manager	4th - Evicted
16	Danny Wisker	29	England	Margate	Demolition man	3rd - Third place
16	Joel Williams	19	Wales	Cardiff	Student	2nd - Runner-up
16	Chloe Wilburn	25	England	Doncaster	Office administrator	1st - Winner
17	Victoria Jensen	30	England	Chigwell	Model and DJ	19th - Walked
17	Andrew Tate	29	United States	Chicago	Professional kickboxer	18th - Ejected
17	Marco Pierre White Jr.	21	England	London	Model	17th - Evicted
17	Natalie Rowe	52	England	Bradford	Dominatrix/author	16th - Evicted
17	Georgina Cantwell	24	England	Kent	Unemployed	15th - Evicted
17	Emma Jensen	30	England	Chigwell	Model and DJ	14th - Ejected
17	Charlie Doherty	31	England	Folkestone	Dancer and entertainer	13th - Evicted
17	Chelsea Singh	48	England	Chelsea	Entrepreneur	12th - Evicted
17	Lateysha Grace	23	Wales	Port Talbot	Model and singer	11th - Evicted
17	Ryan Ruckledge	24	England	Blackpool	Energy broker	10th - Evicted
17	Laura Carter	30	England	Bradford	Model and club hostess	9th - Evicted
17	Alex Cannon	27	England	Liverpool	Model and personal trainer	8th - Evicted
17	Sam Giffen	23	England	Lytham	Hair stylist	7th - Evicted
17	Jayne Connery	49	England	Buckinghamshire	Private investigator	6th - Evicted
17	Evelyn Ellis	20	Australia	Sydney	Nightclub hostess	5th - Evicted
17	Andy West	34	England	Milton Keynes	Journalist	4th - Evicted
17	Jackson Blyton	24	England	Nottingham	Model	3rd - Third place
17	Hughie Maughan	21	Ireland	Dublin	Traveller and youth worker	2nd - Runner-up
17	Jason Burrill	45	England	Brighton	Property developer and salon owner	1st - Winner
18	Mandy Longworth	51	England	Doncaster	Antiques dealer	22nd - Evicted
18	Arthur Fulford	24	England	Exeter	Unemployed	21st - Walked
18	Imran Javeed	39	England	Leeds	Entrepreneur	20th - Evicted
18	Sukhvinder Javeed	38	England	Leeds	Entrepreneur	19th - Walked
18	Kayleigh Morris	28	Wales	Port Talbot	Clothing concession manager	18th - Ejected
18	Rebecca Jane	32	England	Clitheroe	Detective agency owner	17th - Evicted
18	Lotan Carter	28	England	Essex	Stripper and dancer	16th - Ejected
18	Savannah O'Reilly	26	Ireland	The Liberties	Singer	15th - Evicted
18	Joe Quaranta	56	England	London	Nightclub owner	14th - Evicted
18	Simone Reed	28	England	Teesside	Unemployed	13th - Evicted
18	Sue Evans	48	England	Bedfordshire	Television producer	12th - Evicted
18	Sam Chaloner	24	England	Derbyshire	Construction worker	11th - Evicted
18	Chanelle McCleary	24	England	Manchester	Model and carer	10th - Evicted
18	Ellie Young	23	England	Castleford	Till assistant	9th - Evicted
18	Charlotte Keys	24	England	Doncaster	Estate agent	8th - Evicted
18	Hannah Agboola	23	Nigeria	London	Make-up store host	7th - Evicted
18	Kieran Lee	25	England	Lancashire	CCTV installation engineer	6th - Evicted
18	Andrew Cruickshanks	25	Scotland	Glasgow	Hairdresser	5th - Left
18	Tom Barber	21	Wales	Swansea	Nightclub worker	4th - Evicted
18	Deborah Agboola	25	Nigeria	London	Digital analyst	3rd - Third place
18	Raph Korine	22	United States	Exeter	Student	2nd - Runner-up
18	Isabelle Warburton	21	England	Warrington	Unemployed	1st - Winner
19	Ellis Hillon	19	Scotland	Glasgow	Fast food worker	16th - Ejected
19	Anamélia Silva	31	Brazil	London	Spiritual advisor	15th - Evicted
19	Lewis Gregory	26	England	London	Bricklayer	14th - Evicted
19	Kay Lovelle	32	Georgia	London	Artist	13th - Walked
19	Isaac Jagroop	23	England	Suffolk	Semi-pro footballer	12th - Evicted
19	Kenaley Amos-Sissons	24	England	Nottingham	Call centre worker	11th - Evicted
19	Hussain Ahmed	25	England	Birmingham	Physiotherapist	10th - Evicted
19	Isabella Farnese	23	England	Great Yarmouth	Race horse jockey	9th - Evicted
19	Lewis Flanagan	27	England	Stockton-on-Tees	Bartender	8th - Ejected
19	Tomasz Wania	31	Poland	London	Cleaner	7th - Evicted
19	Brooke Berry	21	England	London	Graphics designer	6th - Evicted
19	Sîan Hamshaw	25	England	Barnsley	Waitress	5th - Evicted
19	Cian Carrigan	23	Ireland	County Tipperary	Farmer	4th - Evicted
19	Zoe Jones	31	England	Halifax	Carer	3rd - Third place
19	Akeem Griffiths	26	Wales	Rhondda Valley	Consultant	2nd - Runner-up
19	Cameron Cole	18	England	Norwich	Vlogger	1st - Winner
20	Farida Khalifa	50	England	Wolverhampton	Hairstylist and make-up artist	16th - Evicted
20	Zak Srakaew	28	Thailand	Manchester	Model	15th - Evicted
20	Hallie Clarke	18	England	Streatham	Youth worker	14th - Evicted
20	Kerry Riches	40	England	Great Dunmow	NHS manager	13th - Evicted
20	Paul Blackburn	23	England	Liverpool	Security officer	12th - Evicted
20	Dylan Tennant	39	England	Coventry	DJ	11th - Evicted
20	Chanelle Bowen	29	Wales	Llanelli	Dental therapist	10th - Evicted
20	Trish Balusa	33	Congo	Luton	Stay-at-home mum	9th - Evicted
20	Tom Bryant	21	England	Limington	Butcher	8th - Evicted
20	Jenkin Edwards	25	England	Bridgend	Barman/cleaner	7th - Evicted
20	Matty Simpson	24	Isle of Man	Ramsey	Doctor	6th - Evicted
20	Noky Simbani	26	Zimbabwe	Derby	Banker	5th - Evicted
20	Yinrun Huang	25	China	Harrogate	Customer support agent	4th - Evicted
20	Henry Southan	25	England	Toddington	Food writer	3rd - Third place
20	Olivia Young	23	Scotland	Glasgow	Dancer	2nd - Runner-up
20	Jordan Sangha	25	England	Scunthorpe	Lawyer	1st - Winner
21	Ryan Bradshaw	28	England	Blackpool	Marketing and events assistant	16th - Evicted
21	Daze Aghaji	24	England	London	Climate activist	15th - Evicted
21	Izaaz Miah	29	Wales	Swansea	Estate agent	14th - Evicted
21	Martha Jones	26	England	Scarborough	NHS administrator	13th - Evicted
21	Dean Quinton	35	England	Walthamstow	Barber	12th - Evicted
21	Lily Benson	20	England	Warrington	Chinese takeaway server	11th - Evicted
21	Khaled Khaled	23	Lebanon	Manchester	Sales manager	10th - Evicted
21	Rosie Weber	29	England	Cornwall	Dental assistant	9th - Evicted
21	Sarah Griffiths	27	England	Church Stretton	Spa account manager	8th - Evicted
21	Thomas Atkinson	20	England	Carlisle	Amputee footballer	7th - Evicted
21	Segun Shodipo	25	England	Watford	Charity videographer	6th - Evicted
21	Nathan King	24	Scotland	Sanquhar	Pork salesman	5th - Evicted
21	Hanah Haji	24	England	Acton	HR manager	4th - Evicted
21	Emma Morgan	53	England	Altrincham	Aesthetics practitioner	3rd - Third place
21	Marcello Dentamaro	34	England	East London	Youth mentor	2nd - Runner-up
21	Ali Bromley	38	England	Leicester	Forensic psychologist	1st - Winner
22	Gani Khan	39	India	Bromley	Pizza restaurant manager	17th - Evicted
22	George Gilbert	23	England	Braintree	Parish councillor	16th - Ejected
22	Cameron Barnes	25	England	Bolton	Personal trainer	15th - Evicted
22	Feyisola Akintoye	33	England	Croydon	Financial advisor	14th - Evicted
22	Farida Khalifa	52	England	Wolverhampton	Hairstylist and make-up artist	13th - Evicted
22	Zelah Glasson	25	England	South London	Personal trainer	12th - Evicted
22	Sam Ashby	27	England	Skipton	Zumba instructor and singer	11th - Evicted
22	Nancy Nocerino	22	Italy	Glasgow	Graduate	10th - Evicted
22	Caroline Monk	56	England	Canvey Island	PR company owner	9th - Evicted
22	Marcus John	22	England	Manchester	Mechanical engineer	8th - Evicted
22	Teja Dalphy	18	England	Bristol	Cleaner	7th - Evicted
22	Tate Reynolds	27	Scotland	Falkirk	Buff butler business owner	6th - Evicted
22	Emily Hewertson	25	England	Northampton	Political events manager	5th - Evicted
22	Cameron Kinch	22	England	Taunton	Farmer	4th - Evicted
22	Jenny Baird	20	Northern Ireland	Derry	Make-up artist	3rd - Third place
22	Elsa Rae	21	England	Essex	Content creator	2nd - Runner-up
22	Richard Storry	60	England	South London	Composer and author	1st - Winner
23	Millie Jarrett	19	Scotland	Paisley	Bartender	17th - Evicted
23	Chelsey Ammari	29	England	Grimsby	Social worker	16th - Evicted
23	Charlotte Nott	18	England	Cowley	Student	15th - Walked
23	Johanne Cade	44	United States	Salford	Online marketer and influencer	14th - Evicted
23	Pauline Adeyemo	31	England	Essex	Carer	13th - Evicted
23	Rob Stirzaker	25	England	Bideford	Radio presenter	12th - Evicted
23	Harry Benton-Symonds	30	England	Croydon	Online fitness coach	11th - Evicted
23	Philip Regan	53	England	Liverpool	Content creator	10th - Evicted
23	Rhianna Collins	21	Russia	Belgravia	Socialite and reality TV star	9th - Evicted
23	Omar El Mayer	21	England	London	Jewellery seller and rapper	8th - Evicted
23	Frankie Carter	23	England	Eltham	Marketing manager	7th - Evicted
23	Catrin Richards	23	Wales	Aberdare	Teaching assistant	6th - Evicted
23	Lynx Noumey	24	Cameroon	Wolverhampton	Property developer	5th - Evicted
23	Samuel Keen	21	England	Slough	Administrative apprentice	4th - Evicted
23	Yasmin Graham	29	England	Manchester	Teacher	3rd - Third place
23	Twinks Burnett	36	England	East London	Fashion stylist and hype girl MC	2nd - Runner-up
23	Rochelle Rackham	57	England	Essex	Housewife and nail technician	1st - Winner

== Specials ==
Series	Name	Age	Nationality	Hometown	Occupation	Status
Teen	Hasan Shah	18	England	London	Student	8th - Evicted
Teen	Shaneen Dawkins	18	England	Leeds	Student	7th - Evicted
Teen	James Kelly	18	Scotland	Glasgow	Student	6th - Ejected
Teen	Jade Dyer	18	England	Suffolk	Student	5th - Evicted
Teen	Tommy Wright	18	England	Dorset	Student	4th - Evicted
Teen	Tracey Fowler	18	England	Cheshire	Student	3rd - Third Place
Teen	Caroline Cloke	18	England	Kent	Student	2nd - Runner-up
Teen	Paul Brennan	18	Northern Ireland	Belfast	Student	1st - Winner
Panto	Anouska Golebiewski	22	England	Manchester	Participated in BB4	Not competing
Panto	Jade Goody	23	England	London	Participated in BB3	Not competing
Panto	Kitten Pinder	25	England	Brighton	Participated in BB5	Not competing
Panto	Marco Sabba	21	England	Middlesex	Participated in BB5	Not competing
Panto	Melanie Hill	30	England	London	Participated in BB1	Not competing
Panto	Narinder Kaur	32	England	Leicester	Participated in BB2	Not competing
Panto	Nick Bateman	37	England	Kent	Participated in BB1	Not competing
Panto	Spencer Smith	25	England	Cambridge	Participated in BB3	Not competing
Panto	Tim Culley	25	England	Worcester	Participated in BB3	Not competing
Panto	Victor Ebuwa	23	England	London	Participated in BB5	Not competing
Celebrity Hijack	Jade Eden	21	England	London	Beauty queen	12th - Evicted
Celebrity Hijack	Liam Young	19	England	Liverpool	Entrepreneur	11th - Evicted
Celebrity Hijack	Victor Arata	19	England	Birmingham	Circus performer	10th - Evicted
Celebrity Hijack	Latoya Satnarine	19	England	London	Dancer	9th - Evicted
Celebrity Hijack	Jay Wilson	19	England	London	Fashion designer	8th - Evicted
Celebrity Hijack	Calista Robertson	19	England	London	Classical musician	7th - Evicted
Celebrity Hijack	Nathan Fagan-Gayle	21	England	London	Singer/songwriter	6th - Evicted
Celebrity Hijack	Jeremy Metcalfe	19	England	Hampshire	Racing driver	5th - Evicted
Celebrity Hijack	Anthony Ogogo	19	England	Suffolk	Boxer	4th - Evicted
Celebrity Hijack	Amy Jackson	21	England	Oxford	Conceptual artist	3rd - Third Place
Celebrity Hijack	Emilia Arata	18	England	Birmingham	Circus performer	2nd - Runner-up
Celebrity Hijack	John Loughton	20	Scotland	Edinburgh	Politician	1st - Winner
Ultimate	Josie Gibson	25	England	Bristol	Participated in BB11	14th - Walked
Ultimate	John McCririck	70	England	London	Participated in CBB3	13th - Evicted
Ultimate	Coolio	47	United States	Pennsylvania, U.S.	Participated in CBB6	12th - Ejected
Ultimate	Makosi Musambasi	29	Zimbabwe	Buckinghamshire	Participated in BB6	11th - Evicted
Ultimate	Nadia Almada	33	Portugal	London	Participated in BB5	10th - Evicted
Ultimate	Michelle Bass	29	England	Newcastle	Participated in BB5	9th - Evicted
Ultimate	Vanessa Feltz	48	England	London	Participated in CBB1	8th - Evicted
Ultimate	Ulrika Jonsson	43	Sweden	Buckinghamshire	Participated in CBB6	7th - Evicted
Ultimate	Preston	28	England	Brighton	Participated in CBB4	6th - Evicted
Ultimate	Nick Bateman	42	England	Kent	Participated in BB1	5th - Evicted
Ultimate	Victor Ebuwa	29	England	London	Participated in BB5	4th - Evicted
Ultimate	Chantelle Houghton	27	England	Essex	Participated in CBB4	3rd - Third Place
Ultimate	Nikki Grahame	28	England	London	Participated in BB7	2nd - Runner-up
Ultimate	Brian Dowling	32	Ireland	County Kildare	Participated in BB2	1st - Winner

== See also ==
- List of Celebrity Big Brother (British TV series) housemates
