= BB20 =

BB20 may refer to:

- Big Brother 20 (disambiguation), a television program in various versions
- USS Vermont (BB-20), a United States Navy battleship
