= Big Brother 22 =

Big Brother 22 is the twenty-second season of various versions of television show Big Brother and may refer to:

- Big Brother 22, the 2020 edition of the U.S. version
- Big Brother Brasil 22, the 2022 edition of the Brazilian version
- Big Brother 22 (UK), the 2025 edition of the British version
