= Big Brother 20 =

Big Brother 20 is the twentieth season of various versions of television show Big Brother and may refer to:

- Big Brother 20 (U.S.), the 2018 edition of the U.S. version
- Big Brother Brasil 20, the 2020 edition of the Brazilian version
- Big Brother 20 (UK), the 2023 edition of the British version
