= Farida Khalifa =

British television personality (born 1972)

- Born: 29 December 1972 (age 53); Wolverhampton, England
- Occupations: Television personality; hairstylist; make-up artist
- Years active: 2009–present
- Known for: Big Brother

Farida Khalifa (born 29 December 1972) is a British television personality and TikToker, as well as a hairstylist and make-up artist. She was a housemate on the twentieth series of Big Brother in 2023, and returned as a housemate for the twenty-second series in 2025, placing 16th and 13th respectively. She also has appeared as a contestant on Come Dine with Me (2009) and Blankety Blank (2023).

== Life and career ==
Khalifa was born on 29 December 1972 in Wolverhampton, England and works as a hairstylist and make-up artist. She is of Indian descent and is a practicing Muslim. She made her first appearance on television as a contestant on the Channel 4 competition Come Dine with Me in August 2009. She ultimately finished in third place with 17 points. In September 2023, Khalifa appeared on an episode of Blankety Blank. She was eliminated in the first round.

In October 2023, Khalifa entered the Big Brother house as a housemate on the twentieth series following its revival on ITV. Khalifa had confrontations with several of her fellow housemates including Olivia Young, after eating salmon off her plate, as well as Kerry Riches, whom she faced the first eviction alongside, receiving 8 nominations in the first week. Khalifa became the first housemate to be evicted from the series on 13 October. Two years later, Khalifa re-entered the house as a housemate on the twenty-second series in October 2025, alongside Emily Hewertson who had been evicted first in said series. Khalifa is the first person in the history of Big Brother UK to compete as a housemate in two separate series of the civilian version. She was evicted on Day 34 of the series, finishing 13th of 17 housemates.

== Filmography ==
As herself
Year	Title	Role	Ref.
2009	Come Dine with Me	Contestant; 4 episodes	
2023	Blankety Blank	Contestant; 1 episode	
2023	Big Brother	Housemate; series 20	
2025	Big Brother	Housemate; series 22	
