= Big Brother (British TV series) series 20 =

Big Brother
- Series 20
- Series twenty logo
- Hosted by: AJ Odudu; Will Best
- No. of days: 42
- No. of housemates: 16
- Winner: Jordan Sangha
- Runner-up: Olivia Young
- Companion show: Big Brother: Late & Live
- No. of episodes: 36

Release
- Original network: ITV2; ITV1 (Note: The Launch, the fourth and fifth Live Evictions and the Live Final were the only episodes aired on ITV1.)
- Original release: 8 October – 17 November 2023

Additional information
- Filming dates: 7 October – 17 November 2023

Series chronology
- ← Previous; Series 19 Next → Series 21

Big Brother 2023, also known as Big Brother 20, is the twentieth series of Big Brother to air in the United Kingdom. It is the first series to air on ITV2 after ITV gained the rights to the series in August 2022, almost four years since it last aired on Channel 5. The series began on 8 October 2023, with a launch show airing simultaneously on both ITV (ITV1 and STV) and ITV2, with the remainder of the series broadcasting primarily on the latter channel. It is co-presented by AJ Odudu and Will Best, who also front the companion show, Big Brother: Late & Live.

On 17 November 2023, Jordan Sangha was announced as the winner of the series, beating Olivia Young who finished as runner-up. At 42 days, this was the shortest-running regular series of Big Brother in the UK, surpassing the seventeenth series, which lasted 50 days. This was surpassed by the succeeding series, which ran one day shorter.

== Format ==
Following the commissioning of the show, ITV announced that the series would feature a new cast of carefully selected housemates, from all walks of life. The series is set to run for up to six weeks, with "cameras capturing [the housemates'] every move, and the nation following every twist and turn." Shopping tasks, nominations and live evictions returned, with the public once again voting throughout the series and ultimately determining the winner, who would walk away with a £100,000 cash prize.

== Housemates ==
On 7 October 2023, a day prior to the airing of the launch show, the Big Brother social media accounts posted close-up teasers of the sixteen housemates' eyes.

Name	Age on entry	Hometown	Day entered	Day exited	Result	Ref.
Jordan Sangha	25	Scunthorpe	1	42	Winner	
Olivia Young	23	Glasgow	1	42	Runner-up	
Henry Southan	25	Toddington	1	42	3rd place	
Yinrun Huang	25	Harrogate (originally from China)	1	42	4th place	
Noky Simbani	26	Derby (originally from Zimbabwe)	1	42	5th place	
Matty Simpson	24	Ramsey, Isle of Man	1	40	Evicted	
Jenkin Edwards	25	Bridgend	1	39	Evicted	
Tom Bryant	21	Limington	1	39	Evicted	
Trish Balusa	33	Luton (originally from the Democratic Republic of the Congo)	1	35	Evicted	
Chanelle Bowen	29	Llanelli	1	35	Evicted	
Dylan Tennant	39	Coventry	1	28	Evicted	
Paul Blackburn	23	Liverpool	1	28	Evicted	
Kerry Riches	40	Great Dunmow	1	24	Evicted	
Hallie Clarke	18	Streatham	1	21	Evicted	
Zak Srakaew	28	Manchester (originally from Thailand)	1	14	Evicted	
Farida Khalifa	50	Wolverhampton	1	7	Evicted	

=== Future Appearances ===
In 2025, Farida Khalifa returned as a late-entrant housemate during series 22.

== Nominations table ==
	Week 1	Week 2	Week 3	Week 4		Week 5	Week 6			Nominations received
	Week 1	Week 2	Week 3	Day 23	Day 25	Week 5	Day 37	Final Day 42		Nominations received
Jordan	Paul	Paul, Noky	Hallie, Jenkin	Not eligible	Jenkin, Noky	Chanelle, Olivia	Jenkin, Olivia	Winner (Day 42)		8
Olivia	Farida	Matty, Henry	Dylan, Matty	Not eligible	Trish, Noky	Banned	Matty, Jordan	Runner-up (Day 42)		10
Henry	Farida	Zak, Paul	Paul, Noky	Not eligible	Dylan, Paul	Noky, Olivia	Jenkin, Noky	Third place (Day 42)		8
Yinrun	Kerry	Kerry, Noky	~~Hallie~~, ~~Kerry~~	Not eligible	Dylan, Paul	Chanelle, Noky	Jenkin, Tom, Tom	Fourth place (Day 42)		1
Noky	Kerry	Henry, Jordan	Chanelle, Dylan	Dylan, Kerry, Olivia	Paul, Dylan	Chanelle, Tom	Henry, Tom	Fifth place (Day 42)		16
Matty	Kerry	Olivia, Kerry	Olivia, Kerry	Not eligible	Olivia, Dylan	Olivia, Jordan	Jenkin, Olivia, Tom	Evicted (Day 40)		5
Jenkin	~~Olivia~~, Farida	Henry, Zak	Hallie, Trish	Not eligible	Dylan, Noky	Jordan, Trish	Jordan, Henry	Evicted (Day 39)		6
Tom	Farida	Hallie, Jordan	Trish, Hallie	Not eligible	Noky, Trish	Trish, Noky	Noky, Jordan	Evicted (Day 39)		5
Trish	Paul	Kerry, Paul	Chanelle, Dylan	Dylan, Kerry, Olivia	Dylan, Paul	Chanelle, Tom	Evicted (Day 35)			16
Chanelle	Kerry	Zak, Trish	Hallie, Noky	Not eligible	Dylan, Trish	Trish, Yinrun	Evicted (Day 35)			6
Dylan	Farida	Matty, Henry	Trish, Kerry	Not eligible	Trish, Noky	Evicted (Day 28)				12
Paul	Farida	Trish, Jordan	Trish, Noky	Not eligible	Trish, Noky	Evicted (Day 28)				10
Kerry	Farida	Zak, Matty	Trish, Dylan	Not eligible	Evicted (Day 24)					11
Hallie	Farida	Zak, Trish	Henry, Tom	Evicted (Day 21)						6
Zak	Henry	Hallie, Olivia	Evicted (Day 14)							5
Farida	Kerry	Evicted (Day 7)								8
Notes	1, 2	none	3	4	5	6	7	8		
Against public vote	Farida, Kerry	Henry, Zak	Dylan, Hallie, Trish	Dylan, Kerry, Olivia	Dylan, Noky, Paul, Trish	Chanelle, Jenkin, Noky, Olivia, Trish	Jenkin, Jordan, Tom	Henry, Jordan, Matty, Noky, Olivia, Yinrun		
Evicted	Farida; Most votes to evict	Zak; Most votes to evict	Hallie; Most votes to evict	Kerry; Most votes to evict	Paul; Most votes to evict	Chanelle; Most votes to evict	Tom; Most votes to evict	Matty; Fewest votes (out of 6)	Henry; 19.64% (out of 3)	
Evicted	Farida; Most votes to evict	Zak; Most votes to evict	Hallie; Most votes to evict	Kerry; Most votes to evict	Paul; Most votes to evict	Chanelle; Most votes to evict	Tom; Most votes to evict	Noky; 5.28% (out of 5)	Olivia; 20.16% (out of 2)	
Evicted	Farida; Most votes to evict	Zak; Most votes to evict	Hallie; Most votes to evict	Kerry; Most votes to evict	Dylan; Most votes to evict	Trish; Most votes to evict	Jenkin; Most votes to evict	Yinrun; 17.14% (out of 4)	Olivia; 20.16% (out of 2)	
Evicted	Farida; Most votes to evict	Zak; Most votes to evict	Hallie; Most votes to evict	Kerry; Most votes to evict	Dylan; Most votes to evict	Trish; Most votes to evict	Jenkin; Most votes to evict	Jordan; 37.8% to win		

Notes

- ^Note 1: Olivia was initially nominated for eviction after being chosen as the hardest housemate to live with by Jenkin in the Launch Night twist. She later won immunity after not being ranked the least entertaining.
- ^Note 2: This week housemates were required to nominate only one housemate for eviction instead of two.
- ^Note 3: As a punishment for discussing nominations, Yinrun's nominations were voided.
- ^Note 4: As part of the Halloween task, Noky became "possessed." She then had to select one housemate to help decide which three housemates would be nominated for eviction. Noky chose Trish. A flash vote was held on Day 24, during Big Brother: Late & Live, and the evicted housemate left through the back door.
- ^Note 5: For Day 28's double eviction, the four or more housemates with the most nominations faced the public vote.
- ^Note 6: On Day 29, as part of the Hunger Games task, Chanelle was chosen to be given immunity by her winning team, while Jenkin was chosen to be nominated by his losing team. As a punishment for discussing nominations, Chanelle's immunity was later revoked and Olivia was banned from nominating.
- ^Note 7: On Day 37, housemates nominated face-to-face and the three housemates with the most nominations were "fake evicted". As a rule of the face-to-face nominations three housemates had to be nominated, as the housemates with the least nominations Matty & Yinrun had to break the tie between Henry, Noky, Olivia & Tom. Unbeknownst to the remaining housemates, the evictees moved Next Door and a public vote would result in two housemates being evicted and the surviving housemate re-entering the house.
- ^Note 8: On Day 39, the voting lines opened for the public to vote for the winner. On Day 40, voting was frozen and Matty, the housemate with the fewest votes, was evicted via the back door. The voting percentages for the finalists reflect their overall share of the final vote, and do not reflect the regular voting freezes that took place during the final. Jordan won with 65.22% of the vote over Olivia's 34.78%.

== Weekly summary ==
The main events in the Big Brother 20 house are summarised in the table below.

Week 1	Entrances	On Day 1, Jenkin, Farida, Tom, Hallie, Trish, Yinrun, Jordan, Zak, Chanelle, Dylan, Noky, Matty, Paul, Henry, Olivia and Kerry entered the house.
Week 1	Twists	On Day 1, Olivia was automatically nominated to face the first eviction by Jenkin. Later, Big Brother revealed that she would have the chance to win immunity if she was not ranked least entertaining in the next task. On Day 2, she ultimately was not ranked least entertaining in the task and earned immunity from this week's eviction.
Week 1	Nominations	On Day 6, housemates nominated for the first time. This time, however, the housemates only had to nominate one housemate for eviction. Farida and Kerry received the most nominations and therefore faced the public vote.
Week 1	Tasks	On Day 1, throughout launch night housemates took part in a variety of party games. The first was "Musical Statues", and as Yinrun was the winner she rewarded with breakfast in bed and had to choose one housemate to prepare it for her the next morning; she chose Jenkin. The housemates were then told they were playing "Hide and Seek" and had to hide in an area of the house. Upon Matty's entrance, he had to declare which housemate he found first, which he said to be Jenkin, who subsequently lost privileges to hot water for the next 24 hours. Once all housemates had entered, they took part in "Pass the Parcel" and each layer contained a question. Paul was asked which housemate he would least like to share a bed with; he chose Dylan who was then forced to sleep on the floor. Kerry was asked which housemate she thought had the "Most Questionable Dress Sense"; she chose Jenkin who therefore lost access to his suitcase. Jenkin was asked which housemate he thought would be the "Hardest to Live With"; he chose Olivia who was told she would face the first public vote.; On Day 2, housemates took part in a task where they would rank each other based on various characteristics. However, Olivia was given a secret mission to earn herself immunity from the first eviction. Olivia was told that she would have to not be ranked least entertaining to earn herself immunity. She ultimately was not ranked least entertaining, and earned herself immunity from this week's eviction.; On Day 3, housemates took part in a task where they had to last the longest laying on an oversized bed. Dylan, Matty, Paul and Zak lasted the longest and won themselves a private cocktail party.; On Day 4, the housemates took part in their first shopping task "Big Bro's Ltd", in which the housemates were split into a hierarchal format in an office and had to complete various tasks within the company. Henry, Trish and Yinrun served as the "Big Wigs", followed by Farida, Jordan, Kerry, Matty and Zak as "Middle Management", ultimately leaving Chanelle, Dylan, Hallie, Jenkin, Noky, Paul and Tom as the "Bottoms". Jordan was appointed "Fire Warden" and had to guide the housemates through an evacuation procedure which they had to complete within a certain time limit, housemates successfully followed the procedure twice and passed this part of the task. Throughout the duration of the task, the "Bottoms" had to separate paper clips. For the next part of the task, Paul and Zak visited "BB's Post Room" in which they had to organise letters by using the map and placing them in the correct pigeon hole, however they were unable to complete the task to Big Brother's satisfaction and failed this part of the task. Paul was later promoted to "Middle Management" and Farida was demoted to the "Bottoms". The next task consisted of Kerry and Noky visiting the "Finance Department" where they had to count the amount of coins that fell down a chute, to which they succeeded. For the final part of the task in the I.T department, "Bottoms" Olivia and Tom had to untangle wires to find the correct plugs and hand them to Matty in "Middle Management" who would place the plug in the correct socket, all whilst receiving electric shocks. The housemates passed the shopping task on Day 5 after successfully completing four out of five tasks, and were subsequently rewarded with a luxury shopping budget.
Week 1	Exits	On Day 7, Farida became the first housemate to be evicted.
Week 2	Nominations	On Day 11, housemates nominated for the second time. Housemates were now required to nominate two housemates for eviction instead of one in the previous week. Henry and Zak received the most nominations and therefore faced the public vote.
Week 2	Punishments	On Day 12, as punishment for writing secret messages on each others backs and discussing nominations, Hallie and Olivia were sent to jail in the garden.; On Day 13, Hallie received a further punishment from Big Brother for her discussion of nominations, and was forced to wear a sign with "Warning: Rule Breaker" written on it, as well as a cone hat.
Week 2	Tasks	On Day 8, Chanelle was given a secret mission to give backhanded compliments to the other housemates. She passed her secret mission and won the housemates a huge jar of sweets.; On Day 9, housemates took part in their second shopping task, "Big Brother's Happy Happy Happy Camp", in which housemates had to spend the night camping in the garden whilst completing a series of tasks as well as remaining happy at all times. The first of which included two teams, the orange team consisting of Hallie, Henry and Zak and the green team consisting of Olivia, Paul and Trish. One member of each team had to read instructions; Henry and Olivia respectively, whilst the other members had to pitch a tent in the mud and stormy weather within 40 minutes. They passed this part of the task, and as the green team pitched their tent the fastest, they won access to sleep inside the "VIP Glamping" area inside the house, however with only two tickets available, Olivia and Paul were chosen whilst Trish had to remain outside. For the next part of the task, the remaining housemates Chanelle, Dylan, Jenkin, Jordan, Kerry, Matty, Noky, Tom and Yinrun had to withstand the downpour of rain in the garden, which they completed and collectively chose Jenkin and Kerry to receive tickets to join the "VIP Glamping" area. On Day 10, housemates took part in "laughter yoga" for the next part of the task in which they had to laugh simultaneously for five minutes, but they did not pass as several housemates failed to do so. As a result of multiple housemates failing to remain happy throughout the duration of "Big Brother's Happy Happy Happy Camp", they failed the shopping task, after only completing two out of four challenges and therefore received an economy shopping budget.; On Day 13, housemates took part in "Big Brother's Fast Food" in which Chanelle and Jenkin had to prepare various disgusting food items which were delivered by Tom and had to be eaten by the other housemates. They passed this task and were awarded with a takeaway.
Week 2	Exits	On Day 14, Zak became the second housemate to be evicted.
Week 3	Nominations	On Day 18, housemates nominated for the third time. Trish received five nominations, as did Hallie. However as a result of Yinrun's rule break, her nominations were subsequently voided and thus her nomination for Hallie was revoked. Dylan and Hallie were therefore tied on four nominations and faced the public vote alongside Trish.
Week 3	Punishments	On Day 18, as punishment for discussing nominations, Yinrun was sent to jail in the garden. Her nominations were also voided.
Week 3	Tasks	On Day 16, housemates took part in their next shopping task, in which the Big Brother house was transformed into an ant kingdom. Housemates were split into two colonies: The blue colony consisting of Jenkin, Jordan, Kerry, Noky, Olivia, Paul and Trish, and the orange colony consisting of Chanelle, Dylan, Hallie, Henry, Matty, Tom and Yinrun. Each team had to appoint a "Queen Ant" to lead their colony, and chose Noky and Chanelle respectively. At random intervals during the day, ant eggs would drop through chutes and housemates would have to be the first to grab the egg and transfer it to their team's nest. Throughout the shopping task, the colonies competed in challenges to gain advantages in the final task. The first task entailed three housemates from each team having to hold giant pretend food items above their head in a test of endurance, with Jenkin, Olivia and Paul competing for the blue colony and Dylan, Matty and Tom competing for the orange colony. The blue colony lasted the longest and won the first advantage. The second challenge was completed by Henry and Kerry in which they entered a dark room had to identify various items using only their smell. Henry identified the most items correctly and won an advantage for the orange colony. On Day 17, for the final task, each colony had to assemble a map puzzle using directions from their teams "Queen Ant". To earn the luxury shopping budget, each colony had to complete the puzzle in under 15 minutes. The orange team completed their puzzle in time and therefore won the control the shopping list, however the blue colony failed to complete their puzzle in under 15 minutes, meaning that the housemates failed the shopping task and received an economy shopping budget.; On Day 19, housemates took part in "The Runway" in which they had step on various tiles along a catwalk to identify the correct path in order to win access to a VIP Party. Should they get the path wrong, they would be splattered with gunge. Only the first eight housemates to complete the runway would win access to the party, which transpired to be Chanelle, Dylan, Hallie, Jordan, Matty, Noky, Olivia and Trish.; On Day 20, housemates took part in a "Kiss Cam" which entailed them having to demonstrate their best kiss on a perspex screen in the diary room. Each housemate then had to vote for who they thought was the best kisser. Hallie and Paul received the most votes and won a pamper party.
Week 3	Exits	On Day 21, Hallie became the third housemate to be evicted.
Week 4	Nominations	On Day 24, in the early hours, Noky and Trish gave killer nominations to Dylan, Kerry and Olivia, who therefore faced a flash public vote.; On Day 25, housemates nominated for the fourth time. Dylan, Noky, Paul and Trish received the most nominations and faced this week's double eviction.
Week 4	Twists	On Day 23, Noky became possessed. Big Brother informed her that she must recruit another housemate as an accomplice to complete a secret task; she chose Trish. In the early hours of the morning, they would have to say the words "Halloween" into the bathroom mirror three times to open Big Brother's secret passage. If successful, they would gain the power to give killer nominations to three housemates. If caught, they would both suffer consequences. They remained undetected and successfully gained access.
Week 4	Tasks	On Day 22, housemates visited the "Venting Machine" in which they each had to vent their frustrations in order to win a snack of their choice from the vending machine. The more they vented, the higher the portion of their snack would be.; On Day 23, housemates began their next shopping task. They were told by "Evil Big Brother" that they must endure their biggest fears in Big Brother's Room 101. For their first task, housemates were presented with a ouija board, in which they had to state their evicted housemates' names five times to summon their spirit. They subsequently faced visits from Farida, Zak and Hallie, who each delivered a warning message about one of the housemates. On Day 24, housemates re-entered Room 101 to face their fears. Jenkin, Tom and Yinrun had to remain still in a room with an evil clown, whilst Chanelle and Jordan had to complete an apple bobbing-style task where they had to retrieve fish guts using only their mouth, in which they all succeeded. Henry, Matty, Noky, Paul and Trish each had to put their hand in a box with an unknown object and identify the number written on the side and add them up to declare a total. Henry got his number wrong, meaning they were unsuccessful in this part of the task. Dylan, Kerry and Olivia then entered Room 101 and were told they would have to face the biggest fear for any housemate; eviction. Following Kerry's eviction, housemates were told on Day 25 that they had successfully completed this week's shopping task and would therefore receive a luxury shopping budget.; On Day 26, "Big Brother's Big Button" was placed in the living area. At various points throughout the day the button would light up and the first housemate to press it would receive either a prize or a punishment. Dylan and Olivia won the house a barista-made drink and a music party respectively, whilst Henry won a luxury dining experience for himself and a housemate of his choice, for which he chose Jordan. Matty won the opportunity to privately discuss nominations with another housemate for ten minutes, and he selected Olivia. Meanwhile, Jenkin received the punishment of having to become the housekeeper until further notice, whilst Chanelle had to be handcuffed to the housemate she had spoken to the least over the last 24 hours, which transpired to be Yinrun. After Trish pushed the button, she was asked to name the housemate she felt was the most "easily led". She subsequently chose Tom who was then forced to become "Big Brother's Little Lost Sheep" and ultimately had to remain in a pen in the garden.; On Day 27, Yinrun was set a secret mission by Big Brother in which she had to become emotional and cry in front of three housemates to win her own party that she could invite six housemates of her choice to. She succeeded in her mission and ultimately chose Chanelle, Dylan, Jenkin, Noky, Tom and Trish to attend.
Week 4	Exits	On Day 24, Kerry became the fourth housemate to be evicted, via the back door.; On Day 28, Paul and Dylan became the fifth and sixth housemates to be evicted.
Week 5	Nominations	On Day 29, as a result of losing "Big Brother's Hunger Games", District B had to vote for a housemate to be automatically nominated for eviction. The majority voted for Jenkin, who therefore faced the public vote.; On Day 32, housemates nominated for the fifth time. Chanelle, Noky, Olivia and Trish received the most nominations and thus faced this week's double eviction, along with Jenkin.
Week 5	Punishments	Due to discussing nominations on Day 31, Chanelle's immunity was revoked whilst Olivia was banned from nominating this week and had to write out the words "I must not break the rules" 600 times whilst wearing shock pads.
Week 5	Twists	On Day 29, as a result of winning "Big Brother's Hunger Games", District A were able to grant immunity to one housemate; they chose Chanelle.
Week 5	Tasks	On Day 29, housemates competed in "Big Brother's Hunger Games" in a series of tasks worth points for each round. Housemates were split into two districts; District A consisted of Chanelle, Henry, Matty, Noky and Tom, whilst District B included Jenkin, Jordan, Olivia, Trish and Yinrun. The first task was completed by Chanelle and Olivia for their districts, in which they had to balance rocks on a platform by placing them one at a time. The first tribute to tip the platform would lose the game for their district. Olivia tipped the platform, meaning Chanelle won 10 points for District A. The second task was completed by Jenkin and Tom and was a test of strength and endurance, in which they had to keep a net of rocks suspended in the air by holding on to them for the longest time. Tom held on for the longest and won another 10 points for District A. For the final task, the remaining tributes from each district; Henry, Matty and Noky for District A, and Jordan, Trish and Yinrun for District B had to collect as many roses from the ground in their district's colour as they could in two minutes. At the end of the task, District A were announced as the winners with 301 points and were told they could grant immunity to one housemate, whilst District B were announced as the losers with 270 points and subsequently had to choose one housemate to nominate for eviction.; On Day 30, housemates competed in a task in which they had to stand behind a plinth that had an ice cube on top of it with a key frozen inside. The first housemate to melt down their ice cube, retrieve the key and take it to the Diary Room would win £1,000. Henry melted his ice cube first and ultimately won the cash prize.; On Day 31, housemates competed as security guards in order to "eject" intruders who all had connections to each housemate for this week's shopping task. In pairs, housemates took turns in the "Security Hut" to decide which intruder to eject, therefore letting the other intruder gain access to the house. Housemates must not communicate and face away from their loved one in order to pass the shopping task and risked receiving an economy budget or basic rations if they failed. Jenkin and Jordan ejected Noky's sister, gaining access for Chanelle's dad; Matty and Olivia ejected Jordan's cousin for Henry's sister; Noky and Yinrun ejected Tom's best friend for Jenkin's mum; Chanelle and Trish ejected Matty's boyfriend for Yinrun's boyfriend, and Henry and Tom ejected Trish's sister for Olivia's sister. Housemates passed the task and therefore won a luxury shopping budget.; On Day 32, housemates embarked on "Big Brother's Big Dance Challenge". At various points throughout the day, a noise would be played into the house and the names of four housemates would appear on screen. Those housemates then had to make it to the dance floor in the garden within 30 seconds. Housemates passed the task and won a feast for that evening.; On Day 33, Big Brother launched its own podcast series "Real Talk" in which housemates served as guests to discuss a variety of topics. Henry, Matty and Trish debated about politics, whilst Chanelle, Noky, Tom and Yinrun took part in "Women's Half Hour". Jenkin, Jordan and Olivia's topic was "Advice", and they had to read out and answer questions provided anonymously from the housemates.; On Day 34, housemates visited "Big Brother's Big Barn" to take part in the task "Clucking Hell" which entailed two housemates being chosen as foxes; Matty and Noky, whilst the rest of the housemates were dressed as chickens. If the foxes caught all of the chickens within the time limit they would win a takeaway for that evening, however if they failed; the remaining surviving chickens would win the takeaway. Chanelle and Tom avoided being caught and therefore won the takeaway for themselves.; On Day 34, Jenkin hosted the "Big Bingo Bonanza" in which he would select a ball from the machine and any housemate with that number on their bingo card had to complete a task. Trish was declared the winner and won some ice cream.
Week 5	Exits	On Day 35, Chanelle and Trish became the seventh and eighth housemates to be evicted.
Week 6	Nominations	On Day 37, the housemates nominated for the final time. They were required to nominate face-to-face and only the three housemates with the most nominations would face eviction. Jenkin and Jordan received the most nominations, however Henry, Olivia, Noky and Tom were tied, prompting Matty and Yinrun; who received the fewest nominations, to break the tie. They ultimately chose Tom, resulting in Jenkin, Jordan and Tom facing eviction.
Week 6	Twists	On Day 37, as part of "The Final Reckoning" twist, Jenkin, Jordan and Tom were told that they had been evicted after receiving the most nominations. However they were then informed that this was a "fake eviction" and unbeknownst to their fellow housemates, they would reside in a secret room next door where they had the opportunity to watch live footage from inside the house, and were able to influence tasks and question the housemates. They were then told that all three of them would face the public vote, with the two with the most votes being evicted, whilst the housemate who survived eviction would return to the house. On Day 39, the twist was revealed to the housemates and Jenkin, Jordan and Tom were imprisoned in the garden as "The Outlaws" and were given the opportunity to deliver a final message before the result was announced. Tom and Jenkin became the ninth and tenth housemates to be evicted respectively, meaning Jordan ultimately returned to the house.
Week 6	Tasks	On Day 36, housemates woke up to the aftermath of "Big Brother's Big House Party" and were told that for today's task every time they were faced with a "messy situation" they would have to clean up the mess as quickly as possible and dispose of it via the chute in the garden. The "messes" included the housemates having to clean out thousands of ball pit balls that had flooded the house, as well as emptying the bathroom after it was filled with bubble bath foam. Finally, they had to clean up after two llamas in the garden by mucking out the hay and excrement. Housemates were successful in completing the task, and ultimately won an evening of pampering and spa treatments.; On Day 37, the housemates were split into faculty and students at "Big Brother's Academy" with Noky serving as Deputy Head Teacher, whilst Jordan and Henry were appointed as "Head of Departments" in their subjects of "Law for Beginners" and an "Introduction to Wine" respectively. The remaining housemates acted as students, with Big Brother holding a school disco later that evening.; On Day 38, Henry was set a secret mission in which he had to "say yes" to everything Big Brother asked. Unbeknownst to him however, it was "fake evicted" housemates Jenkin, Jordan and Tom who were in control of setting the tasks. To pass his mission, he had to obey the instructions given by Big Brother through an earpiece, which included having to flirt with Matty, spill water over Yinrun and then ignore her for the duration of task, ask Olivia for a dance lesson but critique it, and pour Noky's oat milk away. He failed his mission after being detected by his fellow housemates, and the prize of caviar blinis and champagne was awarded to the fake evicted housemates instead.; On Day 38, the housemates took part in a talent show in which they had to demonstrate their talents to what they thought was being judged live by the public, however it was actually "fake evicted" housemates Jenkin, Jordan and Tom who had to decide whether to "cheer" or "boo" the performance. At the end of the task, Noky was chosen as the most entertaining, whilst they selected Yinrun as least entertaining.; On Day 39, housemates became "cowboys" and "cowgirls" for a task in which they had had to complete various challenges in order to win American refreshments. For their first challenge, each housemate had to ride a mechanical bull and stay on it for as long as possible. In order to pass this part of the task, the house had to collectively spend over five minutes riding the bull, and they succeeded with a time of 5 minutes and 24 seconds. For the next part of the task, housemates had to slide a shot glass along the bar which would land in a segment that represented a drink, either pickle juice, hot sauce, pineapple juice, Worcestershire sauce, mustard, vinegar or diet cola, and all shots must be drank in order for the housemates to pass. They were successful and won the refreshments for the house.; On Day 40, housemates had the opportunity to experience "7 Minutes in Heaven". Each housemate would enter the diary room and have to decide whether they wanted to enter heaven themselves, or choose another housemate to enter instead. Noky chose to enter and eat a sushi buffet, therefore sacrificing Yinrun's afternoon tea. Matty chose to enter where he was able to dance to music, therefore sacrificing Olivia's chance to listen to karaoke songs and drink a Cosmopolitan. Meanwhile Jordan gave up the opportunity to listen to classical music and drink wine, in order for Henry to spend time with his dog. Later that evening, housemates were awarded their letters from home. Noky and Olivia read each other's letters, as did Jordan and Henry. Matty read Yinrun's letter, and she read his; in which it was announced that Matty had become the eleventh housemate to be evicted.
Week 6	Exits	On Day 39, Tom and Jenkin became the ninth and tenth housemates to be evicted, via the back door.; On Day 40, Matty became the eleventh housemate to be evicted via the back door after receiving the fewest votes to win.; On Day 42, Noky finished in fifth place and Yinrun finished in fourth place whilst Henry finished in third. Jordan was then announced as the winner, leaving Olivia as the runner-up.

== Production ==
In April 2022, it was reported in several tabloid newspapers that ITV Studios were in talks with production company Banijay, who own the rights to Big Brother, to revive the series in 2023, following a five-year hiatus. On 1 August 2022, during the final of the eighth series of Love Island, a 20-second teaser trailer aired on ITV2, with ITV subsequently confirming that the show would return for a new series in 2023. ITV are the third network to gain the rights to the series, following the cancellations of the show on Channel 4 and Channel 5 in 2010 and 2018 respectively.

Following the announcement of the series, Paul Mortimer, the director of Reality Commissioning and Acquisitions said: "This refreshed, contemporary new series of Big Brother will contain all the familiar format points that kept viewers engaged and entertained the first time round [...] We're beyond excited to bring this iconic series to ITV2 and ITVX where it should especially engage with our younger viewers." Ian Katz, the chief content officer for Channel 4, who originally broadcast the show from 2000 until 2010 said of the show's revival that whilst it was a "wonderful show" [...] that "there [was] something depressing about this microwave moment of TV of shows being reheated."

Speaking at the Edinburgh International Television Festival, Kevin Lygo, the Managing Director of Media and Entertainment at ITV said that the success of Love Island influenced the network's decision to recommission Big Brother, saying that "We look at Love Island and we see this extraordinarily successful show that defies all current logic and goes against what people say, that young people don't watch terrestrial television." However, he noted that the series was unlikely to "skew [an audience] as young as Love Island does" due to the former show's legacy, and called it "arguably the sort of best thing there's ever been on television, or most extraordinary thing, that shaped most television afterwards". Lygo also added that the key to Big Brother was to keep it like it was in its "golden period".

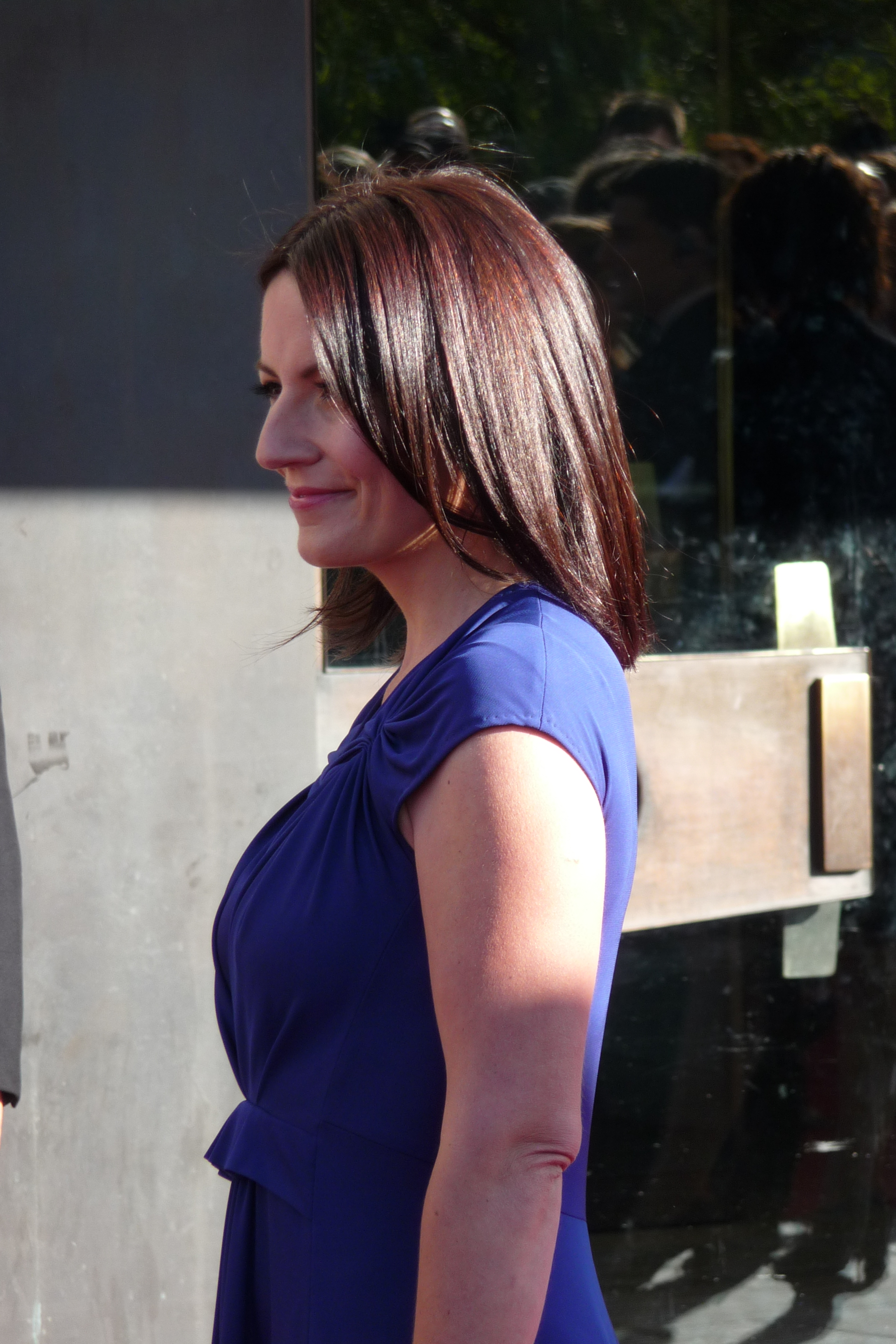
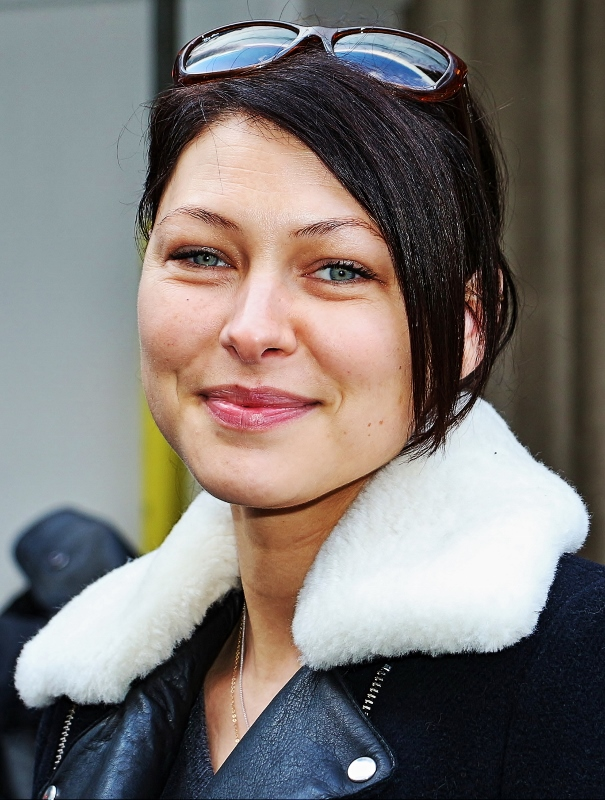
Former hosts Davina McCall and Emma Willis denied rumours of hosting the revival but said that they were happy to see its return.

Davina McCall, who presented the programme on Channel 4 from the show's inception until its original cancellation in 2010, ruled out a return as presenter. She stated that although she "loved the show with all her heart" and had the best 11 years of [her] life [...] and that whoever [hosts the show]... she [would] be supporting it with every fibre in her body", she added that she didn't think it would be her [presenting]. McCall later stated in an interview on Radio X that she would have returned to present the series had she been asked, but maintained her stance that the show was in "safe hands". She did however express interest in filming a cameo prior to the show's opening titles to state her infamous phrase "Fancy another one", which she would use on double eviction nights. Emma Willis, the presenter of the programme prior to its cancellation on Channel 5, also ruled out the possibility of her returning as host saying that she "loved [her] time on the show" but "very much kind of said goodbye to it back then because [she] thought it was over". Willis did however express interest in appearing as a guest panellist on the series' spin-off show. Former Big Brother's Little Brother presenter Dermot O'Leary said that whilst he was sure the new series would be a "hit with viewers", added that the show needed to be "less of a popularity contest" and go back to how it was in the early days as "more of a social experiment". Rylan Clark, who won the eleventh series of Celebrity Big Brother and went on to present the spin-off show Big Brother's Bit on the Side between 2013 and 2018 said he was "devastated" not to be involved in the show's reboot [...] adding that he had "naively assumed that he would have been asked back [as presenter].

It was initially reported that the series was set to launch in March 2023, following the conclusion of the ninth series of Love Island. However, it was later confirmed that the series would launch in autumn 2023. This was said to be due to the high influx of reality television programming on the broadcaster earlier in the year and to avoid clashing with the upcoming series of Love Island and I'm a Celebrity... South Africa, with Big Brother receiving a "more prominent slot" in the autumn schedule. It was also confirmed that the series would be accompanied by a spin-off show. Applications for the series opened online on 10 October 2022. They were originally set to close on 27 January 2023, however, following the announcement of the series being delayed until the autumn, the application window was extended a further three times until 30 June and 14 July, before ultimately closing on 27 July 2023. Over 30,000 applications were received for the series, with producers shortlisting around 500 applicants to conduct in-person interviews.

Following the announcement of the reboot, speculation as to who would be presenting the series began, with the media reporting various potential hosts including Mo Gilligan, Emily Atack, Vick Hope, Olivia Attwood and Roman Kemp, the latter of whom confirmed he had been "in talks" with producers of the series. In April 2023, ITV announced that AJ Odudu and Will Best would be presenting the series. Odudu previously co-presented Big Brother's Bit on the Side alongside Clark in 2013, whilst Best regularly appeared as a panellist on the show. Upon her appointment as presenter, Odudu said she was "so excited to finally be able to say that, yes: [she is] hosting Big Brother! I couldn't be happier" adding that "following in the footsteps of some of [her] favourite broadcasting legends to front such an iconic show is an absolute honour - and to do it alongside my amazing friend Will is the icing on the cake.", whilst Best said he "grew up with Big Brother so getting a chance to host it with [his] mate AJ is a dream come true. I can't wait to tell some housemates not to swear."; in reference to former presenter McCall's catchphrase.

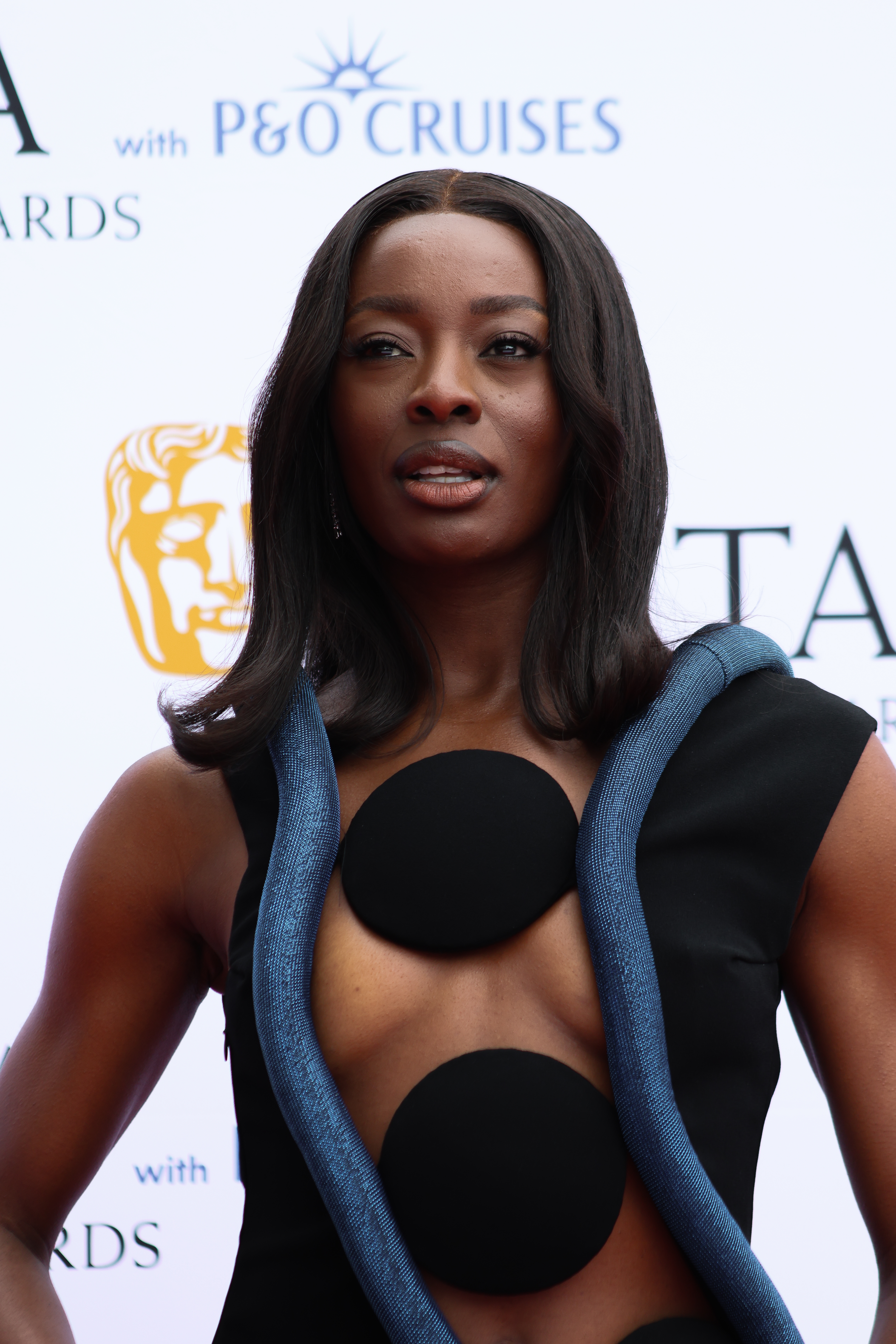
AJ Odudu was announced as one of the new presenters in April 2023.

In June 2023, it was reported that the show's theme song, which had been used since its inception in 2000, could be axed following accusations of sexual harassment allegations against Paul Oakenfold made earlier in the month. However a remixed version of the original theme tune was used in the series' eye reveal, which ultimately served as the theme tune for the series. In July 2023, several news outlets reported that the series was planning to bring back former housemates in a bid to "recapture the magic" of the original series, however ITV later confirmed the reports were false.

"Big Brother house, it's AJ and Will. You are live on ITV2; please do not swear. (nominated housemates' names), the viewers have spoken and we can now reveal that the nth housemate to be evicted from the Big Brother House is...(evicted housemate's name(s)). (Evicted housemate's name), your time in the Big Brother house is over. Say your goodbyes, it's time to leave."

— Odudu & Best's speech when announcing the evicted housemate.

=== Broadcast ===
The series began on 8 October 2023, with a 90-minute pre-recorded launch show airing simultaneously on ITV1 and ITV2, with the remainder of the series being broadcast six nights a week on the latter channel. The launch show took place the day before on 7 October, with the housemates entering the house in front of a live studio audience. It ran for 42 days, the shortest civilian series in the show's history and was covered over 36 episodes, airing six nights a week from Sunday to Friday at 9pm, immediately followed by the live companion show Big Brother: Late & Live at 10pm (or in the case of extended episodes, immediately following the conclusion of the main show). In contrast to previous series on Channel 4 and Channel 5, eviction interviews took place on the companion show. Following this, the Big Brother: Live Stream covered live feed from the house "into the small hours every night" on the broadcaster's new streaming service ITVX. The streaming aired seven nights a week from 11pm until 2am from Sunday from Friday, and from 9pm until 2am on Saturdays. The series concluded with a 90-minute finale episode, where the finalists left the house in the order of their placing, and were interviewed (with the exception of the winner, whose interview took place on Big Brother: Late & Live).

It was announced on 28 October 2023 that from the coming Friday onward, all live evictions and the final would, like the launch show, broadcast simultaneously on ITV1 & ITV2, filling a gap in the Friday evening schedule following the conclusion of the 2023 Rugby World Cup, which had taken up the vast majority of ITV1's weekend schedule through September and October.

=== House ===
The location for the series was not initially confirmed, but it was teased as "an iconic Big Brother house" which would be given "its own contemporary new look ready for this reimagining of the show." A week after the announcement of the series returning, media outlets reported that the series was set to be filmed at ITV Studios Bovingdon after planning applications were submitted for three new studios, as well as a backlot for temporary studios with outdoor filming. It was later speculated that ITV were planning to build a "standalone house" for the series, with Radio Times reporting that a "brand new house built on a huge airfield in the countryside" was in the works. In May 2023, it was confirmed that the house would be located at Garden Studios in North London and was said to boast "versatile staging", as well as an "in-house virtual production studio". On 6 October 2023, ITV revealed photos of the garden on social media, with Richard Arnold conducting a tour of it on Good Morning Britain. Later that day, the Big Brother social media accounts posted a video which depicted the construction of the house, before subsequently revealing the Diary Room chair that evening, a red, orange and yellow chair made from post-consumer recycled polyester and shaped like the Big Brother eye logo - with a smaller eye in the centre and curved neon coloured lights on the top. The following day, full photos of the new house were released, which for the first time included a mezzanine overlooking the living area, as well as a lift, to ensure that [the house] is "fully accessible to all housemates."

=== Eye logo ===
During the 20-second teaser aired in August 2022, it depicted numerous ITV2 logos forming into the shape of a Big Brother eye. However, the host reveal trailer and the official social media accounts feature the same shaped eye with the ITV2 colour scheme of purple. In July 2023, the official eye logo for the series was revealed in the ad break during the final of the tenth series of Love Island. The eye features multi-coloured icons with various symbols, and the words "Big Brother", it also includes a smaller eye in the centre.

=== Promotion ===
In September 2023, the first set of promotional trailers for the series began airing across ITV channels, both of which featured presenters Best and Odudu. The first trailer saw the pair impersonating narrator Marcus Bentley, whilst the other saw them singing along to the show's theme tune. Later that month, a further set of trailers was revealed, which featured members of the public in "real-life" situations which included a woman attempting to climb out of a toilet window after regretting getting back on the dating apps; a man failing to fit in with his new group of housemates after eating a raw onion from the fridge; a dog licking his owner; a woman who is due back at work after a disastrous eyebrow appointment, and a sperm travelling towards an egg depicting the fertilisation process and representing a couple who had "put the kids to bed early". Each advert begins with narrator Bentley stating the timestamp and concludes with him reiterating the tagline "Big Brother sees it all". The series was also promoted on billboards in various cities around the UK, as well as various posters in PureGym branches, beer mats in pubs and adverts on food delivery company Deliveroo that featured the tagline observing the public undertaking activities.

== Viewing figures ==
Official 7-day consolidated ratings in the table below are taken from Thinkbox and include +1, but exclude viewership on devices.

The first episode was simulcast on ITV1 and ITV2; the rating listed is both added together (2.436m and 0.954m respectively).

This series is the highest-rated civilian series of Big Brother since the eleventh series in 2010, rating higher than any series aired on Channel 5.

	Viewers (millions)					
	Week 1	Week 2	Week 3	Week 4	Week 5	Week 6
Sunday	3.39	1.57	1.45	1.58	1.56	1.65
Monday	2.25	1.69	1.68	1.57	1.50	1.69
Tuesday	1.97	1.60	1.62	1.73	1.56	1.53
Wednesday	1.94	1.62	1.62	1.52	1.54	1.42
Thursday	1.79	1.67	1.68	1.69	1.56	1.47
Friday	1.73	1.50	1.57	2.06	1.80	1.60
Weekly average	2.18	1.61	1.65	1.69	1.59	1.56
Running average	2.18	1.90	1.81	1.78	1.74	1.71
Series average	1.71					
blue-coloured boxes denote shows aired on ITV1 and ITV2.

=== Late & Live ===
	Viewers (millions)					
	Week 1	Week 2	Week 3	Week 4	Week 5	Week 6
Sunday	0.56	0.35	0.32	0.47	0.45	0.59
Monday	0.56	0.37	0.35	0.46	0.43	0.56
Tuesday	0.39	0.33	0.40	0.76	0.52	0.77
Wednesday	0.43	0.35	0.33	0.46	0.53	0.43
Thursday	0.43	0.44	0.41	0.63	0.47	0.57
Friday	0.79	0.74	0.79	0.85	0.99	0.87
