= Big Brother (British TV series) series 22 =

Big Brother
- Series 22
- Series twenty-two eye
- Hosted by: AJ Odudu; Will Best
- No. of days: 48
- No. of housemates: 17
- Winner: Richard Storry
- Runner-up: Elsa Rae
- Companion show: Big Brother: Late & Live
- No. of episodes: 42

Release
- Original network: ITV2
- Original release: 28 September – 14 November 2025

Series chronology
- ← Previous; Series 21 Next → Series 23

Big Brother 2025, also known as Big Brother 22, was the twenty-second series of Big Brother. It was the third civilian series of Big Brother to air on ITV2 after ITV plc gained the rights to the format, and the fifth series to air on the network overall. The series began on 28 September 2025 and was again co-presented by AJ Odudu and Will Best, who also returned to host the companion show, Big Brother: Late & Live, whilst Marcus Bentley returned to narrate the show, having done so since its inception in 2000.

The series was extended by a week, with a run of 48 days, making it the longest series to air on ITV to date. Due to financial issues, Virgin Media Television in Ireland did not broadcast this series, as it had done since the sixteenth series in 2015, leading to backlash amongst Irish fans. It concluded on 14 November 2025, when Richard Storry was announced as the winner of the series, with Elsa Rae finishing as the runner-up. At 60 years old, Storry became the oldest winner of the civilian version of Big Brother in the United Kingdom.

== Format ==
The series retained a similar format to the previous two civilian series on ITV, however was confirmed to run for a week longer in celebration of the show's 25th anniversary, instead running for 42 episodes, airing six nights a week from Sunday to Friday, with a 90-minute launch show and finale episode. The series ran for 48 days and began on 28 September 2025. ITV announced that the series would again feature a new cast of carefully selected housemates, from all walks of life with "cameras capturing [the housemates'] every move, and the nation following every twist and turn." Shopping tasks, nominations and live evictions will return, with the public once again voting throughout the series and ultimately determining the winner, who will walk away with a cash prize. Following the first eviction, it was announced that for the first time since the thirteenth series, the public would be voting to save rather than voting to evict. Big Brother: Late & Live followed afterwards on ITV2, airing from 10pm until 11pm from Sunday to Friday. The "house guest" panelists for this series consisted of Danny Beard, David Potts, Angellica Bell, Harriet Rose, Chloe Burrows, Oti Mabuse and JoJo Siwa respectively, who each appeared in a week's worth of episodes. Following this, the Big Brother: Live Stream covered live feed from the house on ITVX, which aired seven nights a week from 11pm until 2am from Sunday to Friday, and from 9pm until 2am on Saturdays. Due to the effects of Storm Amy, the first live eviction episode of the series was held from the Big Brother: Late & Live studio, with the evicted housemate being met by host Will Best at the entrance corridor, before leaving via the back door.

== Housemates ==
Twelve housemates entered the house on Day 1, during the live launch. A further four entered the house on Day 2, which were revealed on Big Brother: Late & Live that evening. Emily Hewertson, who was evicted from the house on the first day following a twist, re-entered the house on Day 20, alongside Farida Khalifa, who was the first evictee of the twentieth series. They resided alongside the fake evictee in the secret room prior to returning to the house.

Name	Age on entry	Hometown	Day entered	Day exited	Result	Ref.
Richard Storry	60	South London	2	48	Winner	
Elsa Rae	21	Essex	1	48	Runner-up	
Jenny Baird	20	Derry	1	48	3rd place	
Cameron Kinch	22	Taunton	1	48	4th place	
Emily Hewertson	25	Northampton	1	1	5th place (Note: Emily was selected by the public as one of three housemates to be given a "cursed eye", and ultimately became the first housemate to be evicted following a majority decision between them on Day 1. Emily later re-entered the house, via the secret room on Day 20.)	
Emily Hewertson	25	Northampton	20	48	5th place	
Tate Reynolds	27	Falkirk	1	48	6th place	
Teja Dalphy	18	Bristol	1	46	Evicted	
Marcus John	22	Manchester	1	46	Evicted	
Caroline Monk	56	Canvey Island	1	41	Evicted	
Nancy Nocerino	22	Glasgow (originally from Italy)	1	41	Evicted	
Sam Ashby	27	Skipton	1	38	Evicted	
Zelah Glasson	25	South London	1	34	Evicted	
Farida Khalifa	52	Wolverhampton	20	34	Evicted	
Feyisola Akintoye	33	Croydon	2	27	Evicted	
Cameron Barnes	25	Bolton	2	13	Evicted	
George Gilbert	23	Finchingfield	2	11	Ejected	
Gani Khan	39	Bromley (originally from India)	1	6	Evicted	

== Nominations table ==
	Week 1		Week 2	Week 3	Week 4	Week 5	Week 6		Week 7			Nominations received
	Day 1	Days 2–3	Week 2	Week 3	Week 4	Week 5	Day 37	Day 39	Day 44	Final		Nominations received
Richard	Not in House	Zelah, Gani	Cameron B, Elsa	Nancy, Elsa	Feyisola, Zelah	Caroline, Farida	Nancy, Caroline	Nancy, Jenny	No nominations	Winner (Day 48)		8
Elsa	Not eligible	Not eligible	Cameron B, Jenny	Sam, Zelah	Zelah, Tate	Cameron K, Richard	Sam, Nancy	Caroline, Nancy	No nominations	Runner-up (Day 48)		7
Jenny	Not eligible	Not eligible	George, Elsa	Sam, Nancy	Tate, Nancy	Emily, Elsa	Sam, Nancy	Caroline, Nancy	No nominations	Third place (Day 48)		15
Cameron K	Not eligible	Not eligible	Cameron B, Nancy	Nancy, Sam	Marcus, Nancy	Caroline, Nancy	Sam, Caroline	Caroline, Nancy	No nominations	Fourth place (Day 48)		8
Emily	Caroline	Evicted (Day 1)			Teja, Marcus	Teja, Jenny	Jenny, Sam	Teja, Jenny	No nominations	Fifth place (Day 48)		4
Tate	Not eligible	Not eligible	Cameron K, Jenny	Sam, Teja	Jenny, Feyisola	Sam, Jenny	Sam, Nancy	Nancy, Emily	No nominations	Sixth place (Day 48)		15
Teja	Not eligible	Not eligible	George, Tate	Tate, Nancy	Tate, Nancy	Farida, Tate	Caroline, Sam	Caroline, Nancy	No nominations	Evicted (Day 46)		9
Marcus	Not eligible	Not eligible	Sam, Zelah	Nancy, Sam	Nancy, Sam	Farida, Emily	Sam, Nancy	Caroline, Emily	No nominations	Evicted (Day 46)		6
Caroline	Emily	Not eligible	Elsa, Nancy	Richard, Feyisola	Teja, Feyisola	Richard, Teja, Zelah	Jenny, Richard	Jenny, Cameron K	Evicted (Day 41)			10
Nancy	Not eligible	Not eligible	George, Cameron K	Jenny, Cameron K	Jenny, Teja	Richard, Farida	Jenny, Cameron K	Jenny, Cameron K	Evicted (Day 41)			26
Sam	Emily	Not eligible	George, Marcus	Tate, Teja	Feyisola, Jenny	Tate, Richard	Tate, Marcus	Evicted (Day 38)				16
Zelah	Not eligible	Not eligible	Cameron B, Marcus	Nancy, Tate	Tate, Marcus	Farida, Nancy	Evicted (Day 34)					5
Farida	Not in House				Teja, Elsa	Tate, Richard	Evicted (Day 34)					5
Feyisola	Not in House	Zelah, Gani	George, Tate	Tate, Nancy	Tate, Richard	Evicted (Day 27)						5
Cameron B	Not in House	Zelah, Gani	George, Cameron K	Evicted (Day 13)								4
George	Not in House	Zelah, Gani	Elsa, Sam	Ejected (Day 11)								6
Gani	Not eligible	Not eligible	Evicted (Day 6)									1
Notes	1	2	3, 4	5, 6, 7	6, 8	9, 10	11	12	13	14		
Against public vote	none	Gani, Zelah	Cameron B, Elsa, ~~George~~, Richard	Nancy, Sam	Feyisola, Nancy, Tate, Teja	Farida, Richard, ~~Tate~~, Zelah	Nancy, Sam	Caroline, Jenny, Nancy	Elsa, Emily, Jenny, Marcus, Richard, Tate, Teja	Cameron K, Elsa, Emily, Jenny, Richard, Tate		
Ejected	none		George	none								
Evicted	Emily; 2 of 3 votes to evict	Gani; Fewest votes to save	Cameron B Fewest votes to save	Sam; Most votes to move	Feyisola; Fewest votes to save	Farida; Fewest votes to save	Sam; Fewest votes to save	Nancy; Fewest votes to save	Marcus; Fewest votes to save	Tate; 3.54% (out of 6)	Jenny; 17.63% (out of 3)	
Evicted	Emily; 2 of 3 votes to evict	Gani; Fewest votes to save	Cameron B Fewest votes to save	Sam; Most votes to move	Feyisola; Fewest votes to save	Farida; Fewest votes to save	Sam; Fewest votes to save	Nancy; Fewest votes to save	Marcus; Fewest votes to save	Emily; 3.74% (out of 5)	Elsa; 28.36% (out of 2)	
Evicted	Emily; 2 of 3 votes to evict	Gani; Fewest votes to save	Cameron B Fewest votes to save	Sam; Most votes to move	Feyisola; Fewest votes to save	Zelah; Fewest votes to save	Sam; Fewest votes to save	Caroline; Fewest votes to save	Teja; Fewest votes to save	Cameron K 10.41% (out of 4)	Elsa; 28.36% (out of 2)	
Evicted	Emily; 2 of 3 votes to evict	Gani; Fewest votes to save	Cameron B Fewest votes to save	Sam; Most votes to move	Feyisola; Fewest votes to save	Zelah; Fewest votes to save	Sam; Fewest votes to save	Caroline; Fewest votes to save	Teja; Fewest votes to save	Richard; 39.15% to win		

=== Notes ===
- ^Note 1: On Day 1, upon entering the house, each housemate was given an eyeball to carry in with them. After all housemates had entered, a vote opened for the public to decide which housemate they wanted to grant an "Evil Eye" to, ultimately putting them at risk of eviction. Caroline, Emily and Sam received the most votes, and therefore entered the "Exit Room" where they each had to vote for the housemate they wanted to evict.
- ^Note 2: On Day 2, after entering the house, the new housemates Cameron B, Feyisola, George and Richard were told that over the next two days, they would have to choose two housemates to grant an "Evil Eye" to, ultimately nominating them for eviction. They granted them to Zelah and Gani respectively, who therefore faced the public vote.
- ^Note 3: On Day 8, after becoming the recipient of the "cursed eye", Richard automatically faced the public the vote and was required to nominate face-to-face this week.
- ^Note 4: On Day 11, following George's ejection from the house, the vote was cancelled and was re-opened the next day between the remaining nominees Cameron B, Elsa and Richard, whilst previous votes cast did not count.
- ^Note 5: On Day 13, it was announced that this week's eviction would be fake, and that the fake evicted housemate would enter a secret house next door alongside the two new housemates. Sam was fake evicted on Day 20, and entered the secret room alongside returning housemate Emily, and new housemate Farida.
- ^Note 6: On Day 15, after bidding the highest amount of eyes in the "Eyedeal Mini Mart", Caroline bought herself immunity for the next two weeks.
- ^Note 7: On Day 16, Tate was required to nominate face-to-face this week after Marcus purchased the face-to-face nomination card in the "Eyedeal Mini Mart" and opted to give it to him.
- ^Note 8: On Day 22, Emily, Farida and Sam returned from the secret room, and as a result Emily and Farida were immune for this week.
- ^Note 9: On Day 30, housemates were required to nominate face-to-face.
- ^Note 10: On Day 29, Caroline placed the winning and only bid for a "Save and Replace" token in the "Eyedeal Minute Mart". After nominations the following day, she opted to save Tate and chose Zelah as the replacement, who therefore faced the public vote.
- ^Note 11: On Day 38, a flash vote opened at the end of the programme and closed during Big Brother: Late & Live, with the evicted housemate leaving via the back door.
- ^Note 12: On Day 39, as part of "The Perfect Day" task, the housemates were given seven minutes to nominate; if they failed to do so, the day would reset, and they would be required to give their nominations again.
- ^Note 13: On Day 44, Cameron was awarded a pass to the final following a series of challenges. A vote subsequently opened at the end of that evening's show and closed the following morning. The two housemates with the fewest votes were evicted via the back door.
- ^Note 14: The public were voting to win, rather than to save. The voting percentages listed are the finalists' share of the total votes when the lined closed for good; they do not account for intermittent vote freezes during the live final. Richard won with 58% of the vote versus Elsa at 42%.

== Weekly summary ==
The main events in the Big Brother 22 house are summarised in the table below.

Week 1	Entrances	On Day 1, Gani, Cameron K, Nancy, Caroline, Zelah, Teja, Emily, Marcus, Tate, Elsa, Sam and Jenny entered the house.; On Day 2, Cameron B, Feyisola, George and Richard entered the house.
Week 1	Twists	On Day 1, prior to entering the house, each housemate was given an eye to take in with them. It was subsequently revealed that one housemate would be evicted on that evening. After all housemates entered, voting was opened for the public to choose the housemate they wanted to grant an "Evil Eye" to, putting them at risk for eviction. Cameron K, Caroline, Emily, Nancy and Sam were named as candidates for eviction, and were asked by Big Brother to stand behind a podium and place their eye on top. If their eye turned green, that housemate would be spared from eviction; however if their eye turned red, they would be cursed with an "Evil Eye" and therefore nominated for eviction. Cameron K and Nancy were saved, leaving Caroline, Emily and Sam at risk of being evicted. They subsequently entered the "Exit Room" where they had to decide which one of them would be evicted. Each of them had to plead their case on why they should remain in the house, before two eyeballs containing the name of their fellow housemates was placed in front of them, and they had to select the eyeball of the housemate they wanted to evict. Emily chose to evict Caroline, whilst Caroline and Sam both chose Emily, who was ultimately evicted.; On Day 2, after entering the house, the new housemates Cameron B, Feyisola, George and Richard were told by Big Brother that over the next two days, they would have to choose two housemates to grant an "Evil Eye" to, ultimately nominating them for eviction. They opted to give them to Zelah and Gani respectively, who therefore faced the public vote.
Week 1	Tasks	On Day 4, housemates took part in their first shopping task in which the house was transformed in to "Eye-Con Industries" with them taking on the role of factory workers. Big Brother became the "Big Boss" and in order to pass the task, housemates had to manufacture enough eyeballs to meet Big Boss' production target with each of them taking on different roles within the factory. Big Brother also announced that housemates would also be earning wages, paid out in eyes that could be used to buy treats, privileges and advantages within the game. Teja was responsible for transporting the eyes between the departments in a delivery vehicle, whilst George and Richard were in charge of quality control, ensuring that the eyeballs were up to standard. For the first part of the task Cameron K, Jenny, Marcus and Sam had to pump to dispense the liquid formula before transporting it along the line, with the final housemate pouring it into the eyeball mould trays. For the next part of the task, Cameron B, Caroline, Tate and Zelah were on the assembly line and were responsible for glue dispensing, glue distributing, assembling and product sorting using the eyeball clutcher respectively, with the conveyor belt gaining speed throughout and housemates having to avoid using the "pink eyes" that would travel along amongst the regular eyeball halves. Elsa, Feyisola, Gani and Nancy worked on the detailing department for the next part of the task, where they had to carefully paint the eyeballs to match the design documents. Big Brother then called for one housemate to come to the office; Zelah did so and was told that Big Brother would pay out a total of 300 eyes, with each housemate having to take the amount they thought they deserved, before choosing the next housemate to enter and so on. Zelah took 20, and chose Feyisola who took 30. She chose Teja who took 50, then Elsa who took 20, followed by Marcus and Tate who took 25 each. Richard followed and took 50, Cameron K took 36 and Jenny took 20, followed by Caroline who took 4. Nancy took 7, before Sam took the remaining 13, leaving Cameron B, Gani and George without any eyes. At the conclusion of the task, Big Brother revealed the production target was 50 eyeballs, however as the housemates only successfully produced 7, they failed the shopping task and therefore received an economy shopping budget for the week.
Week 1	Exits	On Day 1, Emily became the first housemate to be evicted, via the back door, following a majority decision from her fellow housemates in the "Exit Room".; On Day 6, Gani became the second housemate to be evicted, after receiving the fewest votes to save. Due to the effects of Storm Amy, he was evicted via the back door with host Will Best meeting him from the entrance corridor.
Week 2	Nominations	On Day 9, housemates nominated for the first time. As a result of receiving the "cursed eye", Richard was required to nominate face-to-face and automatically faced eviction. Cameron B, Elsa and George received the most nominations, and therefore joined him in facing the public vote.
Week 2	Punishments	On Day 8, as punishment for discussing nominations, Jenny was sent to jail in the garden.; On Day 8, George was given a formal warning for using unacceptable language and gestures towards Sam.; On Day 10, Caroline was given a formal warning for using unacceptable language towards Zelah and Nancy.
Week 2	Twists	On Day 8, "Big Brother's Mystery Box" was placed in the living area and one housemate was invited to open it. Caroline did so and was ultimately given the "cursed eye", which meant she would have to give her nominations face-to-face and automatically faced the public vote. However, she had the option to pass on the "cursed eye" to another housemate for the cost of one eye. She chose to pass it on to Richard, who was then given the option to pass it on again for the cost of two eyes. He refused and therefore accepted the "cursed eye" and its consequences.
Week 2	Tasks	On Day 7, for the task, housemates had to follow a set of rules given by Big Brother which included having to remain within marked lanes when travelling around the house, spinning around 10 times when passing a roundabout, a housemate having to remain on the "stand here" spot in the garden at all times, protective wear being worn whilst eating, no ball games being allowed in the house, no swearing, no lying down in the bedroom, walking backwards in corridors, no sitting down for more than 10 minutes, having to wear seatbelts whilst sitting on the sofas, as well as not back chatting the wardens. Failure to follow the rules would result in housemates being fined one eye from their accumulated totals for each rule break. Cameron B and George, as the housemates with the fewest eyes, were appointed wardens and had to hand out the fines to housemates, and would earn commission from each fine, with the eyes being placed into a penalty pot. Meanwhile, housemates could earn eyes for themselves by reporting the rule breaks to wardens. At the end of the task, the wardens handed out a total of 28 fines, therefore accumulating 28 eyeballs which they opted to split between themselves.; On Day 10, as part of the repercussions of receiving the "cursed eye", Richard had to eat a "cursed lunch" consisting of a spicy curry and rice.; On Day 11, housemates began their next shopping task, in which the house was transformed into a gaming room to play Big Brother's new console, the "Eye Game 3000". They were split into pairs with one housemate becoming the gamer and the other being the avatar. Cameron K, Cameron B, Jenny, Teja, Marcus and Nancy were selected as the gamers, with their respective avatars being Tate, Zelah, Feyisola, Elsa, Caroline and Sam. As the recipient of the "cursed eye", Richard was appointed an "NPC" and therefore spent the day in the "Game Over Zone" in the garden. In their pairs, housemates went head-to-head in a series of multi-player games, with the highest scoring pair in each game earning five eyes each for their accumulated eye totals, whilst the losing pair were sent to the "Game Over Zone". For the first game "Eye-Mazing", the avatar was blindfolded and had to navigate a maze and be given direction by their gamer whilst collecting neon blocks worth 100 points each, all whilst avoiding the "eye-lien". Sam took part first and was guided by Nancy. He managed to collect four blocks totalling 400 points points before being caught by the "eye-lien". Caroline played next being controlled by Marcus and collected five blocks, ultimately winning and scoring 500 points that was added to the total. For the next game "Eye Drops", Feyisola and Tate were controlled by Jenny and Cameron K, who had to answer multiple choice questions about their fellow housemates. They had to direct their avatar to their chosen answer square and if correct, four shaped blocks would fall each worth 50 points each. At the end of the game, Feyisola and Jenny scored 550 points, whilst Tate and Cameron K scored 600, which was ultimately added to the total. For the final game "Eye Kart", Cameron B and Teja had to navigate Zelah and Elsa respectively, who had to ride go-karts blindfolded whilst having to try and raise their teams flag. Each raised flag was worth 150 points each. Teja and Elsa raised one flag totalling 150 points, whilst Cameron B and Zelah raised five flags totalling 750 points, which was added to the total. After the completion of each game, the winning pairs' totals were combined and to pass the task they needed to reach a total score of 2000 points or higher to secure a luxury shopping budget. A score of at least 1500 would result in an economy budget, whilst a score lower than 1000 would result in a basic budget. The housemates scored a total of 1850 points, resulting in them receiving an economy shopping budget for the week.; On Day 12, Nancy was called to the diary room and was set a secret mission in which she, along with Caroline, as the two housemates' with the lowest eye totals, were tasked with stealing a list of belongings, each from a different housemate, as requested by Big Brother in exchange for eyes. They were successful and each earned 23 eyes for their total. The housemates' stolen items were then placed in "Big Brother's Pawn Shop", and they were given the option of buying them back for a certain number of eyes as disclosed by Big Brother. As Nancy and Caroline stole a different item of Jenny's to what Big Brother requested, she received it back automatically.
Week 2	Exits	On Day 11, George was removed from the house following further use of unacceptable language and behaviour.; On Day 13, Cameron B became the third housemate to be evicted, after receiving the fewest votes to save.
Week 3	Entrances	On Day 20, Emily and Farida entered the secret room.
Week 3	Nominations	On Day 16, housemates nominated for the second time. Following the visit to the "Eyedeal Mini Mart", Tate had to nominate face-to-face after being given the "Face-to-Face nominations" card by Marcus, whilst Caroline was immune following her winning bid for the "Buy One Get One Free" immunity pass. Nancy and Sam received the most nominations and therefore faced the public vote. Unbeknownst to the housemates, this week was a fake eviction.
Week 3	Punishments	On Day 14, as punishment for communicating in code, Nancy and Sam's eye totals were reduced to 0.
Week 3	Twists	On Day 13, it was announced that this week's eviction would be fake, and that the evicted housemate would move into a secret room next door, alongside the two new housemates. Sam was fake evicted on Day 20, and moved into the secret room alongside Emily, who returned after being evicted on the first day and Farida, who was the first evictee of the twentieth series. They resided in the secret room until Day 22, before returning to the main house.
Week 3	Tasks	On Day 14, the housemates entered the "Twist of Fate" room one-by-one, where they were faced with twelve cards each holding different powers, which included "Swap", giving the housemate an opportunity to swap their eyes with another player. "Take", meaning they could take 10 eyes from one housemate and add them to their total, "Move", meaning they could take 10 eyes and give them to another housemate, "Lose" meaning a housemate would lose 10 eyes, "Bankrupt" meaning the housemate would lose all their eyes, or "Stick" meaning they would keep their current total. They selected a card before choosing the next housemate to enter. As the richest housemate, Nancy entered first and chose to "Stick", Sam was next and chose to "Swap" his total with Cameron K, Jenny entered next and chose to "Swap" with Richard. Cameron K entered next and chose to "Swap" back with Sam. Richard then entered and chose to "Take" from Nancy, before Tate decided to "Stick". Marcus decided to "Move" from Jenny and give to Sam, whilst Elsa decided to "Move" from Cameron K and give to Marcus. Teja then decided to "Take" from Cameron K, before Caroline decided to "Bankrupt" Richard. Feyisola and Zelah were left with the "Lose" cards and chose Teja and Nancy respectively.; On Day 17, housemates played a game in which they would take turns to choose a question from the box, and would have to answer it honestly before taking a shot of tequila.; On Day 18, housemates began their next shopping task "BB General Hospital" in which the house was transformed into a hospital ward. Caroline, Jenny and Marcus were appointed doctors, Cameron K and Feysiola became nurses, whilst Richard became the ward matron. Elsa, Nancy, Sam, Tate, Teja and Zelah assumed the role of patients. To pass the task, housemates had to earn enough rating points to ensure the hospital achieved an exceptional standard of care. The doctors had to diagnose the patients with different illnesses before administering a various treatments. Patients could upgrade to "luxury private healthcare" for 5 eyes, which Tate, Teja and Zelah opted to do so. Elsa was diagnosed with "Lazy Bones syndrome" and when an alarm sounded, had 60 seconds to gather all the falling pills in the garden and place them in boxes before the timer ran out, Teja was given "Whing-itis" and had to be administered a disgusting medicine. Tate was said to require a "Personality Transplant", for which part of the task, the doctors were tasked with moving different personality traits along a buzz wire, which if touched would give Tate an electric shock. They earned 30 rating points. Sam was diagnosed with "Chronic Spineless Disorder" and was probed with questions from the doctors about his fellow housemates which he had to answer honestly, in order for the bar to move up the spine on the X-ray, he was successful and earned 30 rating points. Meanwhile Nancy and Zelah were both diagnosed with a "Broken Funny Bone" and were forced to dress up as clowns. The medical staff received a total of 5 out of 20 rating points on offer for maintaining their duties to Big Brother's standard, losing points for several cases of unprofessional behaviour. The other patients received 20 rating points for completing their various treatments. Housemates accumulated a total of 85 rating points, the exact pass mark needed to secure a luxury shopping budget, which they therefore received.
Week 3	Exits	On Day 20, Sam was fake evicted from the house, after receiving the most votes to move into the secret room.
Week 4	Nominations	On Day 23, housemates nominated for a third time. Caroline remained immune as a result of purchasing her "Buy One Get One Free" immunity passes, whilst as new housemates, Farida and Emily were also immune from being nominated. Feyisola, Nancy, Tate and Teja received the most nominations and therefore faced the public vote.
Week 4	Punishments	On Day 24, as punishment for discussing nominations, Elsa was sent to jail in the garden.
Week 4	Tasks	On Day 21, the housemates were told that Big Brother had assumed the role of "ChatBBT" and would be ranking the housemates in a series of categories based on analysis of them in the house. However unbeknownst to them, the results were chosen by housemates Emily, Farida and Sam in the secret room. They first had to rank them from "Most to Least" popular, intelligent, interesting, powerful and memorable. For the next part of the task, the housemates were given a series of questions, and whoever the secret housemates decided to answer would have to complete a dare. The questions included and "Who is the most rubbish housemate?", which they gave to Elsa who then had to sit in a bin, "Who is the wildest housemate?", given to Richard who had to impersonate a lion, "Who are the two biggest enemies?", which they have to Caroline and Richard who were then chained together, "Who has the biggest potty mouth?", given to Jenny who had to place five of her eyes in a swear jar, a "Who is the biggest coward", given to Tate who had to dress as a chicken. At the end of the task Big Brother told the secret housemates Emily, Farida and Sam that a total of 50 eyes would be distributed for completion of the task, and they would be responsible for deciding how many to award to the secret house, and how many to keep. They decided to give 11 eyes to the house, splitting the rest between themselves.; On Day 25, housemates began their next shopping task in which the house was transformed into BB International Airport, with them taking on various different roles. Cameron was appointed pilot and Feyisola as co-pilot, Jenny and Sam became flight attendants, whilst the remaining housemates became passengers with Caroline, Richard and Zelah becoming members of a stag party, Farida and Nancy were tourists, Elsa and Emily were returning backpackers and Tate and Teja were businesspeople, whilst Marcus was a single dad. The flight attendants had the opportunity to upgrade two passengers to first class, choosing Nancy and Richard respectively. After checking in, housemates boarded the "British Eyeways" flight and to pass the task and receive a luxury shopping budget, they had to endure the tenure of the flight and clap when they thought the time was up for the task to end. The flight was initially scheduled, however for each rule break, the flight time was extended. Several rule breaks included baggage being left unattended at the airport, cabin crew eating food meant for the passengers, and passengers getting up during the flight whilst the seatbelt signs were on. The final flight time they had to endure was 5 hours and 15 minutes, however housemates decided to forfeit the task and exit the flight before the time was up, ultimately receiving basic rations for the week.; On Day 26, housemates had to collectively decide which of them would receive a 50 eye bonus, who in turn could choose three further housemates to receive 10 eyes each. They had 5 minutes to each write a name on their whiteboard and reach a consensus, or else five eyes would be lost from the potential bonus. They failed to reach a decision twice, and the total was ultimately reduced to 40 eyes. On the third round of voting, they all agreed on Jenny, who decided to give 10 eyes each to Caroline, Teja and Zelah respectively.
Week 4	Exits	On Day 27, Feyisola became the fourth housemate to be evicted, after receiving the fewest votes to save.
Week 5
Week 5	Nominations	On Day 30, housemates nominated for the fourth time and were required to nominate face-to-face. Each housemate had a container of 30 eyes, and for each nomination they received, 5 eyes were deducted from their total. Farida, Richard and Tate received the most nominations. After placing the winning and only bid for the "Save and Replace" token in the "Eyedeal Minute Mart", Caroline decided to save Tate and chose Zelah as a replacement, who therefore faced the public vote alongside Farida and Richard.
Week 5	Punishments	On Day 28, as punishment for Caroline and Nancy discussing nominations, the hot water and hair appliances were switched off and the hot tub was out of bounds until further notice.; On Day 29, as punishment for Zelah eating jam whilst on basic rations, he had to keep his hands in giant jam jars until further notice. His eye total was also reduced to 0, the bottle of crévant he had purchased from the "Eyedeal Minute Mart" was confiscated and he was banned from attending the pizza party Teja had invited him to. As they were aware of or had consumed the jam Cameron K, Emily and Jenny also had their eye totals reduced to 0.; On Day 30, as punishment for housemates who were not invited consuming food from the pizza party whilst on basic rations, hot water and hair appliances were switched off, and the hot tub was rendered out of bounds until further notice again. As they did not break the rules, Cameron K and Richard were awarded with a meal and treats in the snug, whilst all housemates except for them had to return their food purchases from the "Eyedeal Minute Mart".; On Day 31, as punishment for consuming honey whilst on basic rations, Sam was forced to complete a "honey makeover" which entailed him smearing a giant jar of honey over himself.
Week 5	Tasks	On Day 28, housemates took part in "Three of a Kind" in which the housemates were split into four teams of three and were stood in a human fruit machine where they were asked three questions about their fellow housemates and each had to hold up the photo of the housemate they thought was the answer. If all three housemates held up the same answer, each of the team would receive 10 eyes. As there were an odd number of housemates, Farida opted to sit out of the game. Jenny, Cameron K and Zelah went first and got 0 correct. Caroline, Nancy and Sam went next and got 1 question correct, earning 10 eyes each. Elsa, Emily and Teja were next and got 0 correct, followed by Marcus, Richard and Tate who got 2 out 3 questions correct, therefore earning 20 eyes each.; On Day 31, Farida was called to the diary room and was set a secret mission in which she had an hour to convince five of her fellow housemates that she held a variety of different jobs including a lollipop lady, a mime artist, a martial arts instructor, a hand model and a zookeeper. She was successful in doing so and earned a takeaway meal of choice for the house.; On Day 32, housemates began their next shopping task in which Big Brother was locked away in the garden and instead was taken over by "Bad Brother". In order to release Big Brother and pass the task, they had to complete Bad Brother’s twisted tests in order to win up to 20 keys available, only one of which would unlock the chains and set Big Brother free. Farida, Richard and Teja were appointed Bad Brother's henchmen who dined on luxury meals and assisted in ensuring the housemates had a bad day. They first poured bags of rubbish into the living area which the housemates had to tidy up. For the next part of the task, Jenny, Marcus, Nancy and Sam were taken to Bad Brother's Basement, in which quotes from their fellow housemates were displayed on the screen and they each took turns to guess who had said it. If they answered correctly, they could choose another housemate to be gunged, if they guessed incorrectly, they themselves would be gunged. At the end of the challenge, they guessed 5 quotes correctly, therefore earning 5 keys. For the final part of the task, Big Brother's henchmen were called to the basement where they had to decide who would receive "Bad Credit"; they chose Caroline, who lost all of her eye currency and had to throw them over the garden wall. They then had to decide who would receive "Bad Smell"; they chose Sam who had to wear a stink suit and had to be accompanied by Nancy. They then chose Caroline to receive "Bad Luck", who had to spin a wheel to decide when she would lose her ability to nominate, lose her bed, or lose her photo from home. She landed on the latter and had to give her photo away. The final decision was "Bad News"; they chose Emily who had her letter from home shredded. They received 10 keys for this part of the task. After accumulating a total of 15 keys, they had to test them one by one to try and free Big Brother. They were successful in doing so and therefore won a luxury shopping budget.; On Day 33, housemates competed in "Bobbing for Eyes", an apple bobbing style competition in which one by one, they would bob for an eye using only their mouths. After they had retrieved an eye, they read out the question written on the back and if they were willing to answer it, they could keep the red eyes which were worth 5 eyes to add to their currencies.
Week 5	Exits	On Day 34, Farida and Zelah became the fifth and sixth housemates to be evicted respectively, after receiving the fewest votes to save.
Week 6
Week 6	Nominations	On Day 37, housemates nominated again. Nancy and Sam received the most nominations and therefore faced a flash public vote.; On Day 39, housemates nominated for the final time. As part of the shopping task, they each had to nominate within 7 minutes. Caroline, Jenny and Nancy received the most nominations and therefore faced public vote.
Week 6	Punishments	On Day 36, as punishment for discussing nominations, Caroline, Nancy and Sam were sent to jail in the garden, and their eye currencies reduced to 0.
Week 6	Tasks	On Day 35, housemates visited the "Bank of Big Brother" cashpoint, where they were given access to their eye currency balance, as well as the other housemates' balances. One by one, they had to enter and choose one housemate's account to empty and add it to their own balance. If the account they selected had not already been chosen by another housemate, the transaction would become pending, whereas if they chose an account that had already been picked, the transaction would be blocked. The housemates who had been targeted then had to identify who had tried to empty the account, if they answered correctly, the transaction was blocked and their eyes would remain, however if they failed to identify them correctly, the eyes would be added to the balance of the housemate who had stolen them. Teja entered and chose to steal from Marcus, Caroline chose to steal from Cameron K, Richard entered and also tried to steal from Marcus but was unsuccessful. Tate entered and stole from Emily, Marcus then stole from Tate and Elsa stole from Jenny. Emily and Sam then tried to steal from Jenny, unsuccessfully. Nancy then unsuccessfully chose Tate. Jenny stole from Teja, before Cameron K unsuccessfully chose Emily. As the targeted housemates, Cameron K, Elsa, Emily, Jenny, Marcus and Tate each failed to identify who had voted for them, their eye currencies were stolen.; On Day 37, housemates took part in "Spin the Firework", where they had to spin a wheel and whichever housemate it landed on would have to choose an "explosive" question relating to another housemate. They were successful and won a firework party for that evening.; On Day 39, housemates embarked on their final shopping task in which they had to have "The Perfect Day". Throughout the day, they were set a series of tasks with Big Brother expecting "perfection". If housemates made any mistakes, the day would reset and they would have to start again from the beginning. They first had to complete the "Perfect Wake Up", in which housemates each had to find one of the 10 alarm clocks hidden around the house and bring them to the sofas within 2 minutes. They next had to compete "The Perfect Breakfast", in which all housemates bar Tate were given a full English breakfast, whilst Tate had to stand in a circle and catch his breakfast items which were fired by Marcus from Big Brother's "Splat-apult". Housemates next had to complete "The Perfect Nominations", in which they were given 7 minutes for each housemate to come to the diary room and nominate two housemates for eviction. For the final part, they had to compete "The Perfect Task" in which each housemate was assigned a different role and had to transport an eye within an obstacle course throughout the house. Housemates ultimately failed to complete "The Perfect Day" after 16 attempts and therefore received an economy shopping budget.
Week 6	Exits	On Day 38, Sam became the seventh housemate to be evicted, via the back door, after receiving the fewest votes to save.; On Day 41, Nancy and Caroline became the eighth and ninth housemates to be evicted respectively, after receiving the fewest votes to save.
Week 7
Week 7	Tasks	On Day 42, housemates competed in "Eye-deal Eyeballs" for their final opportunity to win eye currency within the game. To win they had to claim one of eyeballs that fell down the chute in the garden, open it and complete the "Eye-dea" inside. ther says, Cameron K selected a "Good Eye-dea", and was told that eyes would be flying over the garden wall and however many he could catch would be added to his eye total. He accumulated 31 eyes. Elsa received a "Bad Eye-dea" and had to dress up as a frog, hop around and say "Ribbit" whenever she spoke until further notice. Furthermore, when a frog noise was played into the house, she had to hop over to her lily pad in the garden, sit on the fishing chair and place her rod in the water. She was successful and won 20 eyes. Marcus received a "Bad Eye-dea" eye and in order to win 20 eyes, he had to name the housemate he thought was the most "jarring". He chose Emily who was therefore sent to Big Brother's "Jarring Jar" in the garden until further notice. Marcus and Tate received a "Good Eye-dea" and competed in "Big Brother's House Hop", a space hopper race. Tate won and therefore received 20 eyes. Teja then received a "Bad Eye-dea" and in order to win 20 eyes, had to identify out of the remaining housemates who had nominated her throughout the series, however she failed to do so. For the final eyeball, Emily received a "Good Eye-dea" and had to bankrupt one housemate's eye currency and add it to her own. She ultimately chose Teja.; On Day 45, as the first finalist, Cameron K was appointed the "King of the Big Brother House", and had to wear a royal cloak, a crown and sit upon a throne. As King, he also had to appoint various roles to the other housemates. He made Jenny his "Royal Aid", who had to play a recorder to announce the King's entrance whenever he entered a room, Marcus as the "Court Jester", who had to keep the King entertained, Tate as the "Royal Comforter", who had to become his personal footrest, and Emily as the "Royal Cook", who was in charge of cooking Cameron K and his "Royal Aid" Jenny their meals. King Cameron K was later given the opportunity to send one of his subjects to jail; He chose Tate, and selected Emily as the subject to throw rotten tomatoes at him. Elsa, Teja and Richard subsequently competed in a horse race in the garden, with the latter winning. Later that evening, housemates had to take part in "Big Brother's Royal Talent Show" to entertain the King. Emily, Marcus, Teja and Elsa had to perform a dance routine, Tate had to deliver a royal roast, whilst Jenny and Richard had to perform a duet to "Sweet Caroline" by Neil Diamond. King Cameron K subsequently selected Tate as the winner.; On Day 46, housemates embarked on their final task that was themed around the film Wicked: For Good in which the house was transformed into Emerald City with them becoming "Citizens of Oz". For the task, they competed in pairs; Cameron K and Marcus, Elsa and Tate, Emily and Jenny and Richard and Teja, with them competing to win an Emerald City party that evening. Pairs had to remain together at all times, not leaving each other's side, no swearing, no acting in anger and no bringing gloom to the Emerald City, with any rule breaks resulting in penalties following the competition. When housemates heard the sound of trumpets, pairs had to race by marching to take their place on the raised platforms in the garden, with the winning pair earning a time advantage in the competition. The public were asked to vote in a series of polls on Instagram, which included "Which housemate(s) has changed for good the Most/Least", "Which housemate(s) is the Most/Least wicked", "Which housemate(s) is the Most/Least loyal, and Which housemate(s) always does the Right/Wrong thing". In their pairs, housemates had to rebuild the yellow brick road accurately and as quickly as possible, until they reached the end of the path. Along the way, they were faced with construction stop signs, and when they reached one, they had to answer one of the questions that had been put to the public, and find the yellow brick with the name they thought was the answer. Once the yellow brick road had been built, housemates could stop their timer by pressing the "Oz" token at the end. Following the addition of time penalties for behaviour during the task, Emily and Jenny were the slowest pair to complete the yellow brick road. They therefore failed to earn their invitations to the Emerald City Party and were servers for the party. Later that evening, housemates returned to the yellow brick road where they each received a gift from the Wizard. They were instructed to stand behind their podium to each open their gifts, and the two housemates who received a ticket home were evicted via the backdoor. This was ultimately Marcus and Teja.
Week 7	Twists	On Day 44, housemates were given the chance to win a pass to the final in which they competed in a series of rounds until the recipient was chosen. For the first round, they had to place white eyeballs in the jars of the housemates they felt had a positive impact on the house, and red eyeballs in the jar of the housemates they felt had a negative impact on the house. Each housemate was given three of each colour to distribute amongst their fellow housemates and could award more than one if they wished. Big Brother subsequently revealed that all eyeballs, both positive and negative were worth one point. As Marcus and Richard received the fewest eyeballs, they were out of the running for the pass. For the next part, the remaining housemates had to compete in pairs to hold up an inflatable eyeball using only their heads. Elsa and Teja, and Tate and Emily dropped their eyeballs first, therefore Cameron and Jenny, the final two housemates still in the running, were interrogated by their fellow housemates and had to answer various questions as to why they deserved the pass. The other housemates then had to collectively decide who would be awarded the pass to the final. They chose Cameron K.
Week 7	Exits	On Day 46, Marcus and Teja became the tenth and eleventh housemates to be evicted respectively, via the back door.; On Day 48, Tate and Emily finished in sixth and fifth place respectively. Cameron K finished in fourth place whilst Jenny finished in third. Richard was then announced as the winner, leaving Elsa as the runner-up.

== Eyes ==
For this series, Eyes were introduced to the housemates as house currency. Throughout the series, housemates were able to earn, steal and collect Eyes in a number of tasks, which would ultimately give them power and the right to buy treats, privileges and, advantages within the game. The table below lists the housemates' eye totals at the end of each corresponding week.

	Place	1	2	3	4	5	6	7
Richard	1	50	31	0	21	23	23	1
Elsa	2	15	12	0	1	31	5	0
Jenny	3	10	11	17	52	25	26	1
Cameron K	4	36	31	17	14	30	0	1
Emily	5				10	25	8	0
Tate	6	20	24	9	30	21	11	1
Teja	7	20	20	10	25	30	18	0
Marcus	8	20	12	0	21	38	6	4
Caroline	9	4	28	0	21	5	0	
Nancy	10	7	30	0	11	26	0	
Sam	11	13	9	0	23	31	0	
Zelah	12	20	25	10	21	35		
Farida	13				6	16		
Feyisola	14	22	19	3	4			
Cameron B	15	0	14					
George	16	0	14					
Gani	17	0						

=== Week 1 ===
- Following the shopping task on Day 4, Big Brother called for one housemate to come to the office; Zelah did so and was told that Big Brother would pay out a total of 300 eyes, with each housemate having to take the amount they thought they deserved, before choosing the next housemate to enter and so on. On Day 5, housemates entered the "Eyedeal Mini Mart" where they had the opportunity to spend their eye currencies. Teja purchased a chinese banquet voucher for four housemates costing 15 eyes, as well as a coffee hamper for 10 eyes and crisps for 5 eyes. Feyisola bought olives for 8 eyes. Marcus bought salted caramel crispies, Tate bought a melon and Elsa bought popcorn for 5 eyes each respectively. Meanwhile, Jenny bought a pamper hamper for 10 eyes. Caroline, Cameron K, Nancy, Richard, Sam and Zelah opted not to buy anything, whilst Cameron B, Gani and George were unable to enter due to their totals being 0.

=== Week 2 ===
- For the task on Day 7, Cameron B and George, as the housemates with the fewest eyes, were appointed wardens and had to hand out the fines to housemates, and would earn commission from each fine, with the eyes being placed into a penalty pot. Meanwhile, housemates could earn eyes for themselves by reporting the rule breaks to wardens. At the end of the task, the wardens handed out a total of 28 fines, therefore accumulating 28 eyeballs which they opted to split between themselves. Following Cameron B's eviction on Day 13, he decided to donate his eyes to Nancy.

=== Week 3 ===
- On Day 15, housemates re-entered the "Eyedeal Mini Mart" where they could spend their eye currencies. On offer was a "buy one get one free" immunity pass which would mean they'd be immune from the next two evictions. As the richest housemate, Caroline entered and placed the highest bid, ultimately winning. Zelah chose to spend 10 eyes on a protein hamper. Tate chose the "Send a housemate to jail card" for 10 eyes and chose to imprison Marcus for the evening. Marcus spent 10 eyes on a "Face-to-Face nominations" card and gave it to Tate, meaning he had to deliver his next nominations face-to-face, as well as a "Meal for Two" pass which he used for him and Elsa for 8 eyes, and Pick 'n' Mix for 4 eyes. Jenny bought a bar of chocolate for 5 eyes. Cameron K bought crisps for 4 eyes, and placed a bid on immunity for 2 eyes. Teja bought a bar of chocolate for 5 eyes, and bid on the immunity for 10 eyes. Feyisola bought a bottle of wine for 10 eyes, and a birthday music playlist pass for that evening's party, costing 6 eyes, as well as bidding on the immunity for 1 eye. Elsa bought Pick 'n' Mix, crisps and cookies, each costing 4 eyes each. Richard, Nancy and Sam were unable to enter due to their totals being 0.

=== Week 4 ===
- On Day 25, during the shopping task, new housemates Farida and Emily entered the "Eyedeal Duty Free" store ahead of the shopping task, where Farida purchased a neck pillow and an energy drink, costing 5 and 2 eyes respectively and Emily bought sour cream crisps costing 3 eyes. Following Feyisola's eviction on Day 27, she opted to give her eyes to Teja.

=== Week 5 ===
- On Day 29, housemates entered the "Eyedeal Minute Mart" again. As the richest housemates, Jenny and Tate entered first. Jenny purchased a phone call from home for 30 eyes, doughnuts for 8 eyes, chocolate for 5 eyes and Pick 'n' Mix for 4 eyes. Tate purchased a chicken, salt and pepper and an energy drink. Caroline, Teja and Zelah entered next. Caroline placed the only and winning bid of 21 eyes for a "Save and Replace" token, which could be used to save a nominated housemate and replace them with another following the next nominations. Teja purchased a pizza party token for her and three other housemates costing 20 eyes. Sam bought a bottle of wine, honey, chocolate biscuits and Pick 'n' Mix. Marcus bought popcorn and Pick 'n' Mix for 5 and 4 eyes respectively, whilst Zelah bought a bottle of crévant for 8 eyes, which was later confiscated following a rule break. Nancy bought a weaving kit for 10 eyes, whilst Emily bought a bottle of rosé for 8 eyes. Cameron K purchased Pick 'n' Mix and a watermelon for 4 and 3 eyes respectively. Richard, Farida and Elsa did not make any purchases. Following Farida and Zelah's evictions on Day 34, they chose to donate their eyes to Caroline and Cameron K respectively.

=== Week 6 ===
On Day 36, housemates entered the "Eyedeal Minute Mart" again. Teja placed the winning bid of 26 eyes for a video call with a loved one, and also purchased a nail hamper and Elsa's toy mouse for 10 eyes each, as well as a bag of popcorn for 4 eyes. Jenny purchased a Chicken Tikka Masala for 5 eyes. Elsa purchased a "Dinner for Two" voucher for 20 eyes, however unbeknownst to her, had to eat it alongside one of the housemates she nominated the previous week; she chose Richard. Tate chose to buy Caroline's photo back for 7 eyes. Marcus purchased a token that would send a housemate to the stocks; he chose Tate, whilst Richard placed an unsuccessful bid of 23 eyes for the video call from a loved one. Cameron K, Caroline, Emily, Nancy, and Sam did not have any eyes and were unable to enter.

=== Week 7 ===
On Day 43, housemates entered the "Eyedeal Minute Mart" for the final time. Housemates were able to combine their eyes for this week's purchases. Tate and Cameron entered first and purchased their letters from home, as well as Teja's for 20 eyes each. Jenny and Marcus entered next, with Jenny purchasing her letter from home for 20 eyes and a book featuring photos of the housemates' highlights for 5 eyes, whilst Marcus bought Emily's shredded letter and sellotape for 22 eyes. Richard and Elsa entered last and purchased their letters, as well as a block of cheese, alongside Emily who bought Marcus' letter for a combined 65 eyes.

== Production ==
In November 2024, prior to the final of the previous series, it was announced that Big Brother would return on ITV in 2025, as well as a twenty-fourth celebrity series, which aired throughout April 2025, in celebration of Big Brother's 25th anniversary, with Odudu and Best returning as presenters. Speaking on the recommissioning of the programme, Paul Mortimer, Director of Reality Commissioning and Acquisitions said: Big Brother programming has firmly established itself across ITV's platforms and become a favourite with our viewers. Together, Big Brother and Celebrity Big Brother have grown audiences on ITV1 and ITV2 and amassed almost 100 million streams on ITVX. We're therefore very excited to be able to throw open the house doors once again for another series of both Big Brother and Celebrity Big Brother in 2025 which are sure to promise more unmissable entertaining and captivating moments.", whilst Katy Manley, Managing Director of Initial, added: "We are so excited to be coming back with more Celebrity Big Brother and Big Brother. Both series have really resonated with audiences, and we can't wait to make more. As always, viewers can look forward to Big Brother keeping housemates – celebrities and civilians alike – on their toes. Applications for the series opened on 14 November 2024, a day prior to the final of the previous series, and remained open until 8 August 2025.

=== Eye logo ===
The official eye logo for the series was revealed during the initial trailer that aired on 4 August 2025. It depicts a purple background with various different coloured mazes, amongst them is 25 eyeballs, as a nod to the 25th anniversary of the show. Also featured are two sets of stairs and several doors. The purple, orange and white eyeball in the centre is surrounded by an orange and green spiral pattern similar to that used for the third series of Big Brother.

=== House ===
In December 2024, it was reported that ITV would move from the house located at Garden Studios to a new location in London ahead of the twenty-fourth celebrity series. The following month, it was announced that the house would be built at Titan Studios, rendering it the fourth house to be used for the series since the show's inception. The spin-off show Big Brother: Late & Live will be filmed in the neighbouring Versa Studios, who also acquired Titan Studios as a part of their expansion prior to the launch. Speaking on the new location, Jody Collins, director of Initial, the production company behind the show, said "The most iconic house on television has found a new home, and we couldn't be more delighted. The needs of the production are substantial and Versa [Studios] is uniquely equipped to meet these demands. Expect a season filled with exceptional and unforgettable reality moments—we cannot wait!". Meanwhile, Charlie Ingall, the executive director of the studios, said: "Versa's expansion in London has been part of our ambitious growth strategy, and it further elevates our business as a first choice for large scale, high profile productions such as Big Brother. The significant investment we have made in this expansion gives us the ability to create long term homes for our clients, and in turn support the television and film community."

On 26 September 2025, two days before the show's launch, Richard Arnold conducted a tour of the kitchen and living area on Good Morning Britain whilst interviewing winner of the previous series Ali Bromley, with host Will Best subsequently conducting a further tour of the house on This Morning, before ITV revealed photos of the house on social media later that day. The corridor leading into the house featured hand ornaments coming from the wall holding light up eyeballs. The house maintained a similar structure to the twenty-fourth celebrity series, but with updated colour schemes. The living area and kitchen consisted of predominantly orange, turquoise, dark pink and purple furniture, with a new sofa design for the first time since the ITV revival, which was made of up separate blue and dark pink seating joined together as one. The dining table formed the shape of the series eye logo which was printed on top of it. The bedroom used a similar colour palette, with the room primarily consisting of blue and dark pink decor. The vanity station featured stool seating, one of which was shaped like a pair of hands, and mirrors with the eyeball from the centre of the eye logo printed on the back. The bathroom was mainly yellow and orange, with added blue and green decor, as well as stripy seats and a cushioned seating area near the bath. It has two toilets and two showers, as well as three sinks. The garden features artificial grass and has a cushioned seating area which primarily follows a blue and yellow theme, as well as a hot tub. The walls were made up of a variety of colours, and featured both a wooden effect with a cloud filled sky above, as well as an artificial plant wall. The eye at the bottom of the garden was turquoise with an orange border, and had a green and orange centre surrounding the two-way mirror, with sun loungers in front of it. The snug from the twenty-fourth celebrity series returned, which had an artificial plant wall on the outside, with wooden walls and two turquoise armchairs inside. The series theme was maintained throughout the house, with various ornaments and lights taking the shape of eyeballs and hands similar to those used in the trailer, as well as runs along the wall with eyeballs inside them, as in that of the eye logo. Several artificial plants are also featured in the house and in the garden. The corridor leading to the diary room was orange and green, with spherical white lights inside the walls. The diary room chair was revealed the following day, and was a circular chair that took the shape of the centre of the eye logo, featuring the same orange and green spiral pattern, with the purple, orange and white eyeball in the centre. The cushioning and the frame of the chair was pink, and was surrounded by a yellow outer frame that takes the shape of a run, with several eyeballs inside it.

=== Promotion ===
On 4 August 2025, the first 20-second teaser trailer aired during the ad-break of the final of the twelfth series of Love Island. The trailer features a yellow hand emerging from a pool of eyeballs, which subsequently picks up one of the eyeballs and throws it across the screen. A moving CCTV camera is then shown, depicting an eyeball as the lens. The eyeball is then released and bounces onto the ground, whilst another eyeball falls into its place. Further eyeballs are released from a chute within the wall, some of which bounce into a teacup with a picture of an eyeball in. Several of the eyeballs are then seen travelling along a metal ramp, before the eye in itself is revealed. A further trailer began airing on 9 September 2025, which featured shots of various locations and buildings in Britain, including the Tyne Bridge, The Shard and The O2 Arena, some of which had the eye logo projected onto them. Pedestrians were also seen walking along and members of the public watching clips from the previous series on mobile phones was accompanied by the voice of Big Brother who teased "more shocks, more strategy and more drama", which was followed up by a person with their feet up at home watching a clip of Big Brother featuring Odudu and Best, the latter of whom says "that's right" in agreement. A blueprint of the floor plan of the Big Brother house is depicted with the voice adding "The house is ready, the nation is ready, the question is; are you ready?". Odudu and Best respond with "ready, Big Brother" and "excited" respectively, before the voice concludes by stating the tagline "the game is changing" and that "Big Brother is here to play". Throughout the trailer, the eye logo is seen in motion, with the eye in the centre narrowing it's eyelids and blinking, whilst the eyeballs roll around the maze of the eye.

Shorter versions of the trailer aired co-currently, one of which featured the voice asking Odudu and Best to "come to the Big Brother house", with the former telling Big Brother they have missed him, whilst the latter asks Big Brother if he has missed them, the eye then narrows with Odudu adding "I'll take that as a no". Another featured the voice asking Odudu and Best to "pick a number between 1 and 30" with Best picking 21 and Odudu choosing 15, before the voice responds "Incorrect. 28.", subsequently revealing that the series would begin on 28 September 2025. A further trailer featured the voice saying "The new housemates are about to arrive; they don't know what awaits them. Big Brother does." Best interjects by saying "And so do we", with the voice responding "No you don't" before Odudu questions "We don't?". The voice answers "no". Another version of the trailer featured the voice teasing "The house is ready; 52 microphones, 93 cameras, 1 Diary Room and more eyeballs than ever before." Odudu then says "You what. What does that mean Big Brother?". The voice addresses Odudu and Best and replies "You'll find out at the same time as everyone else.", before Best responds "I thought we were special." Another version featured the voice addressing the viewer saying "If you; yes you, are sitting on the left hand side of the sofa, you have been evicted. You must leave the room immediately". A final version of the trailer featured the voice saying "You are about to go head to head in a staring competition" with the eye logo narrowing it's eyelid before blinking. After which the voice says "Congratulations, you have beaten Big Brother". Each of the trailers concluded with the tagline. A social media teaser depicted a 3D version of the eye and the words "Big Brother Returns. 28th September. 9pm", whilst an eyeball rolls along metal ramps before dropping off and hitting coloured xylophone keys on the way down, which in turn light up and play the Big Brother theme tune. ITV also posted a promotional teaser on social media featuring Alan Carr in which Odudu's voice is heard saying "Big Brother dares you to do an 80's inspired dance", which Carr subsequently completed. Several teaser videos of Odudu and Best lip syncing to viral quotes were also posted in the lead up to the series.

== Ratings ==
Official 7-day consolidated ratings in the table below are taken from Thinkbox and include +1, but exclude viewership on devices.

	Viewers (millions)						
	Week 1	Week 2	Week 3	Week 4	Week 5	Week 6	Week 7
Sunday	0.90	1.00	0.90	0.94	0.87	0.87	0.86
Monday	1.07	0.99	0.92	1.00	0.95	0.79	0.89
Tuesday	1.02	1.01	0.85	0.92	0.89	0.82	0.81
Wednesday	1.07	0.94	0.86	0.88	0.74	0.92	0.90
Thursday	1.00	0.94	0.87	0.91	0.77	0.80	0.81
Friday	1.03	0.98	0.90	0.90	0.82	0.80	0.82
Weekly average	1.02	0.98	0.88	0.93	0.84	0.83	0.85
Running average	1.02	0.99	0.96	0.95	0.93	0.91	0.90
Series average	0.90						
blue-coloured boxes denote live shows.

=== Late & Live ===
	Viewers (millions)						
	Week 1	Week 2	Week 3	Week 4	Week 5	Week 6	Week 7
Sunday	0.29	0.22	0.22	0.22	0.23	0.26	0.27
Monday	0.30	0.18	0.23	0.25	0.24	0.25	0.28
Tuesday	0.20	0.22	0.22	0.21	0.24	0.32	0.23
Wednesday	0.23	0.21	0.20	0.21	0.21	0.34	0.22
Thursday	0.22	0.20	0.13	0.16	0.19	0.20	0.32
Friday	0.31	0.41	0.36	0.29	0.50	0.37	0.41
Weekly Average	0.26	0.24	0.23	0.22	0.27	0.29	0.29
Running Average	0.26	0.25	0.24	0.24	0.24	0.25	0.26
Series Average	0.26						
