= Me Ol' Bamboo =

Song written by the Sherman Brothers

"Me Ol' Bamboo" is a song written by the Sherman Brothers for the motion picture Chitty Chitty Bang Bang. It was originally written to be choreographed as a morris dance for the film by Marc Breaux and Dee Dee Wood (Mary Poppins, The Happiest Millionaire, The Sound of Music) and adapted for the stage by choreographer Gillian Lynne who also created the choreography for Cats and The Phantom of the Opera.

The song and dance are performed by Dick Van Dyke and about fifteen other men. On Remembering Chitty Chitty Bang Bang with Dick Van Dyke, Van Dyke says that "Me Ol' Bamboo" was the most difficult dancing act he ever undertook.

In the film, Caractacus Potts does the dance to escape an angry victim of his malfunctioning hair-cutting machine. The dance involves the use of bamboo sticks as props. At the end of the dance, Potts collects enough money to buy Chitty.

The song is a light-spirited song about different people and their various usages of cane-like apparatuses. Songwriter/lyricist Robert B. Sherman was inspired to write the song by his own use of a bamboo walking stick, which he used after a World War II knee injury.

It is very similar to the song "Step in Time" from Mary Poppins, also written by the Sherman brothers, with a dance choreographed by Breaux and Wood, and performed by Van Dyke. Both songs are also loosely based on the popular British music hall (vaudeville) repetitive action song "Knees Up Mother Brown".

== In popular culture ==
- In the 1975 film Smile, the Young American Miss Pageant contestants, while doing a routine with bamboo sticks, sing the song off-key while Michael Kidd tries to choreograph the routine.
- The tune was used in the Family Guy episode "420" for the song "A Bag of Weed".
- In Big Brother 10 (UK) contestants had to memorize and perform the dance routine from this song in order to earn a luxury shopping budget during the third week.
- The song was featured in a medley tribute to Dick Van Dyke during a 1998 episode of The Rosie O'Donnell Show.
