= Sophie Reade =

English model (born 1989)

- Born: Sophie Victoria Reade; 18 May 1989 (age 37); Nantwich, Cheshire, England
- Occupations: Reality star; model; pornographic actress
- Television: Big Brother
- Partner: Mario Balotelli (2010–2011)
- Children: 1

Sophie Victoria Reade (born 18 May 1989) is an English reality television star, model and pornographic actress. She is best known for winning the tenth series of Big Brother in 2009.

== Modelling career ==
Reade worked as a promotions model and a glamour model, appearing in Hot Shots Calendar and multiple magazines such as; Nuts and Zoo.

After appearing on Big Brother, Reade posed for Playboy, she was the official 2009 August Cyber Girl.

== Big Brother ==
In 2009, Reade entered the tenth series of Big Brother. During the first week of the show she legally changed her name via deed poll to "Dogface" in order to become an official housemate. Reade broke the main rule of Big Brother on multiple occasions throughout the show, including on Day 33, when Big Brother told her that she must remain silent until 2am as punishment for discussing nominations, which she failed, therefore faced the public vote. On Day 39, she alongside fellow housemate Siavash Sabbaghpour, spoke about nominations, Big Brother told them they were not allowed to swear before 3pm; they both failed this and faced eviction again. On Day 72, as a special prize, Reade legally changed her name back to Sophie from Dogface. Reade was the bookies' favourite to win the series from Day 88, which she did winning the show on Day 93.

Reade formed a romantic relationship with fellow housemate Kris Donnelly during her time in the house.

== Pornography career ==
Reade began modelling regularly for Babestation and in 2023 she began uploading content on OnlyFans.

In 2023 she made her pornographic debut for Brazzers, in Big Titty Yoga Babe. Her first sex scene titled Busty Babe Fucks Boyfriend's Brother, featured pornstars Danny D and Keiran Lee. Reade has gone on to make multiple films for Brazzers and in 2024, began performing for ManyVids.

== Personal life ==
Reade dated footballer Mario Balotelli between 2010 to 2011, the couple split after Reade claimed Balotelli cheated on her. She was also linked with footballers Adam Johnson and Cristiano Ronaldo.

Reade has one child, with the footballer David Goodwillie.

== Filmography ==
Film and television
Year	Title	Role	Notes
2009	Big Brother	Self; housemate	Winner, 108 episodes
2009	Big Brother's Little Brother	Self; ex-housemate	2 episodes
2009	Playboy Cybergirl's	Self; cybergirl	1 episode
2010	Snog, Marry, Avoid?	Self; contestant	1 episode
2010	Come Dine with Me	Self; contestant	1 episode
2011	UK Centrefolds	Self; model	TV special
2012	Big Brother's Bit on the Side	Self; ex-housemate	1 episode
2015	O'Brien	Self; guest	1 episode
2023-	Porn Box	Self; pornstar	Recurring role, 13 episodes
2023-	Brazzers Exxtra	Self; pornstar	Recurring role, 7 episodes
2024	2024 XBIZ Europa Awards	Self; guest	TV special

Pornographic films
Year	Title	Role	Notes
2023	Big Titty Yoga Babe	Self; actress	Pornography debut
2023	Busty Babe Fucks Boyfriend's Brother	Self; actress	
2023	Evermore	Self; actress	Non-sex scene
2024	Big Brother UK Winner - Sophie Reade - Squirts on Me	Self; actress	
2024	Big Step-Brother Winner Sophie Reade Gets Fucked By Truck Driver	Self; actress	
2024	Game Room Threesome	Self; actress	
2024	Pay Per View Plumber	Self; actress	
2024	Sexual Obsession	Self; actress	
2024	Suited and Booty	Self; actress	
2024	Thickest Facial Load for Sophie Reade	Self; actress	
2024	Jenna Hoskins Bondage	Self; actress	
2025	Get Wet	Self; actress	
2025	Sophie Reade's Red Lingerie Balcony Tease	Self; actress	

Preceded by Rachel Rice	Big Brother UK Winner; Series 10 (2009)	Succeeded by Josie Gibson
