= Night Train to Venice =

1993 German gothic-horror film

- Theatrical release poster
- Directed by: Carlo U. Quinterio
- Written by: Toni Hirtreiter; Leo Tichat
- Produced by: Toni Hirtreiter
- Starring: Hugh Grant; Tahnee Welch; Malcolm McDowell; Rachel Rice; Kristina Söderbaum
- Cinematography: Armando Nannuzzi
- Edited by: Wiktor Grodecki
- Music by: Wolfgang Hammerschmid
- Distributed by: International Video Pictures
- Release date: 1 June 1995 (Wide)
- Running time: 98 minutes
- Country: Germany
- Language: English

Night Train to Venice (also released as Train to Hell) is a 1993 German contemporary gothic-horror film directed by Carlo U. Quinterio. This international production was a cooperation of British, Italian, and German artists, including Hugh Grant, Malcolm McDowell, Tahnee Welch, Evelyn Opela, Kristina Söderbaum and Rachel Rice. It was filmed in 1993 and released worldwide in 1995.

The film has been criticized for the non-linear plot it follows and the obvious references to the Gothic genre. In a radio interview in 2002, Hugh Grant deemed the film the worst he has ever been in.

The thriller presents a labyrinthine combination of sexual transgression, darkness and intrigue, bearing a strong similarity to other Gothic texts, including Dracula. The story itself features obscure icons, such as the constant appearance of a woman and child dressed in white, ferocious Rottweilers with a taste for human flesh, Venetians in strange masks and recurring figures of the Commedia dell'arte; all of these elements wrapped in a dream-like atmosphere.

== Plot ==
The young Scottish journalist Martin Gimmle (Grant) is traveling to Venice by train to drop off a copy of his book on European neo-Nazism to an unknown publisher. A neo-Nazi skinhead gang sneaks after him on the train; on the train, Martin meets a bevy of odd characters. Among them is the Stranger (McDowell), an illusive and evil character, who has mysterious powers over people, even their dreams. He also encounters Vera (Welch), a performer who is travelling home with her daughter, and falls in love with her. Martin and Vera are both afflicted with strange and threatening visions that relate to the Stranger; in Martin's case, recurrent visions of savage dogs. While on the train, the skinheads surveil and then attack Martin; Martin leaves a piece of his research materials with Vera to safeguard it.

Upon arriving in Venice, Martin stays with Vera, but continues to see the Stranger. Leaving to visit the publisher, Martin finds the building abandoned, only to find a dog eating a human corpse in one of the rooms. After running out, he is chased by the gang of neo-Nazis and their dogs. During the chase, the Stranger uses his powers on Martin, causing him to crash and lose his memories. The only persons who can help him to go back to his former self are Vera and her daughter. With the research materials returned to him by Vera, he recovers his memories. Martin saves Vera's daughter from a fall, tying back to a vision recurrent throughout the film.

== Cast ==
- Hugh Grant as Martin
- Tahnee Welch as Vera
- Malcolm McDowell as Stranger
- Kristina Söderbaum as Old Woman (Euphemia)
- Rachel Rice as Pia
- Evelyn Opela as Tatjana
- Robinson Reichel as Skinhead Udo
