= Not All Dogs Go to Heaven =

- Family Guy episode
- Stewie with the cast of Star Trek: The Next Generation
- Episode no.: Season 7 Episode 11
- Directed by: Greg Colton
- Written by: Danny Smith
- Production code: 6ACX17
- Original air date: March 29, 2009

Guest appearances
- Patrick Stewart as himself; LeVar Burton as himself; Gates McFadden as herself; Michael Dorn as himself; Wil Wheaton as himself; Denise Crosby as herself; Marina Sirtis as herself; Brent Spiner as himself; Jonathan Frakes as himself; Adam West as Mayor West and himself; Rob Lowe as himself

Episode chronology
← Previous "Fox-y Lady"	Next → "420"
- Family Guy season 7

"Not All Dogs Go to Heaven" is the 11th episode of the seventh season of the American animated television series Family Guy. It originally aired on the Fox network in the United States on March 29, 2009. The episode was directed by Greg Colton and written by Danny Smith. In the episode, Quahog hosts its annual Star Trek convention and the cast members of Star Trek: The Next Generation are guests. After he was unable to ask the actors any questions at a Q&A session, Stewie builds a transporter in his bedroom to beam the cast over and spend the day with them. Meanwhile, Meg becomes a born-again Christian and tries to convert the atheist Brian to Christianity.

The episode received mixed reviews from critics and received a 4.8/7 Nielsen rating. Star Trek: The Next Generation's Patrick Stewart, Jonathan Frakes, Brent Spiner, LeVar Burton, Gates McFadden, Michael Dorn, Wil Wheaton, Denise Crosby, and Marina Sirtis all guest-starred as themselves, and Adam West and Rob Lowe appear at the end of the episode in a live-action scene.

== Plot ==
Meg catches the mumps when the Griffins attend Quahog's annual Star Trek convention, because Peter forced her to stand next to an irresponsible attendee with the mumps to take a picture, believing him to be in costume as an alien. While recovering in bed, Meg becomes a born-again Christian after watching Kirk Cameron on television and begins irritating everyone with her beliefs. Meg is horrified to learn that Brian is an atheist and attempts to persuade him to repent and convert to Christianity, but he repeatedly refuses. Finally taking drastic measures, Meg spreads the word of Brian's atheism around Quahog, which generally hates atheists, turning him into a pariah.

Upon being made a pariah, Brian is banned from every bar and convenience store in Quahog, making it impossible for him to drown his sorrows. Desperate for alcohol Brian fakes his repentance and persuades Meg to cease all hostilities against him so he can get back to drinking, but she takes him to burn books that are "harmful to God" (including On the Origin of Species by Charles Darwin, A Brief History of Time by Stephen Hawking, and a book titled Logic for First Graders). A disgusted Brian admits his bluff and attempts to convince Meg that what she is doing is wrong. When Meg refuses to listen, Brian points out to her that if there were truly a loving God, then he would not have created Meg to have an attractive mother like Lois but have her to more physically resemble Peter, and that she would not be brought into a world where everyone holds her in contempt. Feeling ashamed, Meg concedes to Brian's argument and apologizes for her behavior, confessing that she does not know how she can feel loved. Brian then assures her that the answers are inside herself, and the real meaning of their existence is out there somewhere. Afterward, it is revealed that the entire Family Guy universe takes place within the molecules of a lampshade in the shared bedroom of Adam West and Rob Lowe.

Meanwhile, furious that he did not get a chance to ask the cast of Star Trek: The Next Generation any questions at the convention, and the fact that they instead answered questions completely unrelated to Star Trek, Stewie builds an authentic Star Trek transporter and beams the cast over to interview them (in a nod to the TNG episode "Skin of Evil", Denise Crosby is killed in a show of force). Stewie decides to spend the whole day with the cast, which includes stealing Cleveland's van, having lunch at McDonald's, going bowling, and going to a carnival. However, they prove extremely obnoxious, much to Stewie's annoyance, and he beams everyone back after stating that they have ruined Star Trek: The Next Generation for him.

== Production ==
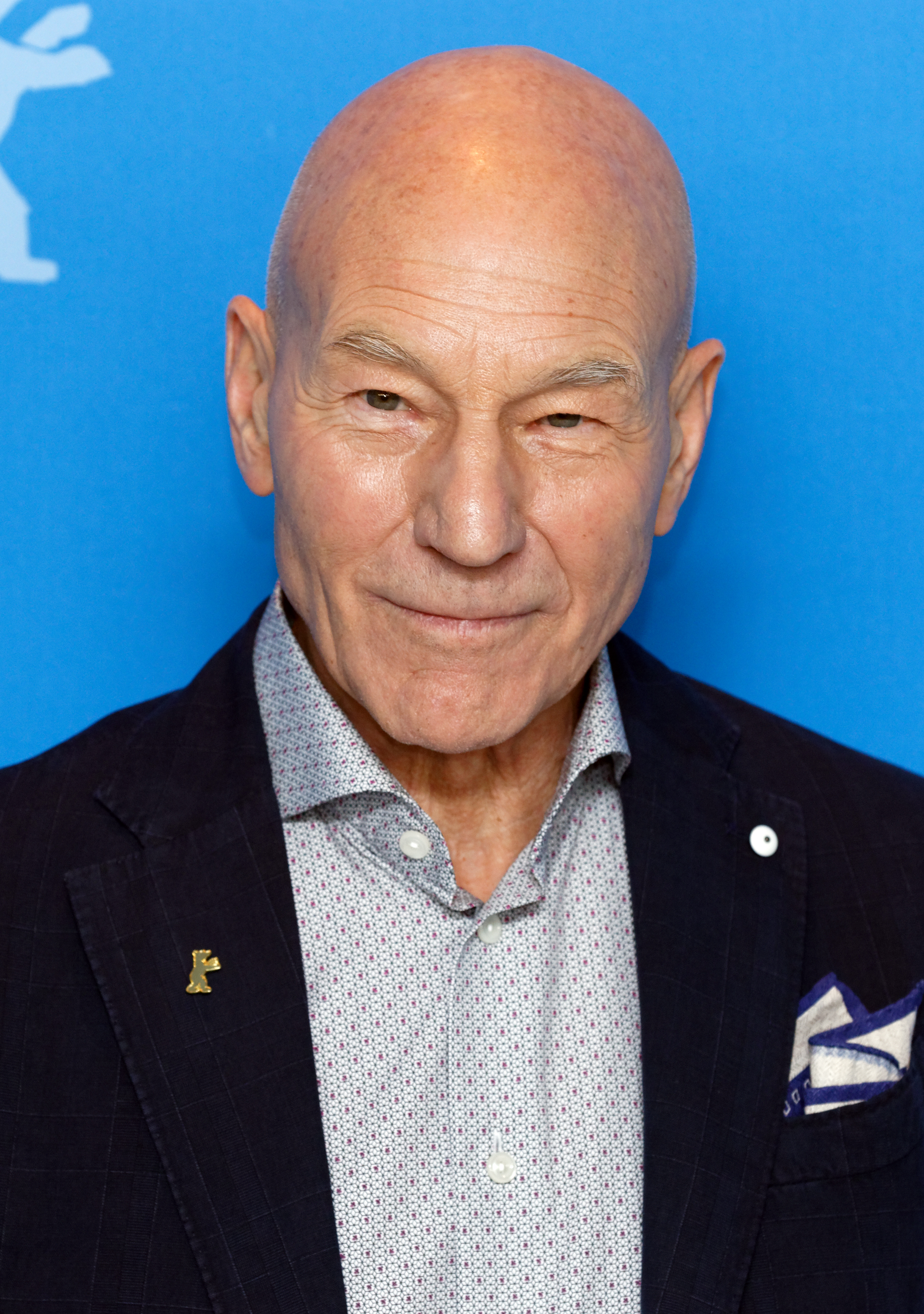
Patrick Stewart (pictured in 2017) voices himself in this episode

"Not All Dogs Go to Heaven" was directed by series regular Greg Colton, in his second episode of the season (his first one being "Road to Germany"). It was written by regular writer and recurring voice actor Danny Smith, in his first episode of the season. Series regulars Peter Shin and James Purdum served as supervising directors. Seth MacFarlane, Family Guy's creator and executive producer, is a fan of Star Trek and made two guest appearances as engineer Ensign Rivers on Star Trek: Enterprise, in "The Forgotten" (season 3, episode 20) and "Affliction" (season 4, episode 15). Former Star Trek: The Next Generation cast members have also made other appearances in Family Guy: Patrick Stewart, for example, briefly voiced Peter Griffin (normally played by MacFarlane) in "No Meals on Wheels" (season 5, episode 14), his American Dad! character, Avery Bullock in "Lois Kills Stewie" (season 6, episode 5), and his Star Trek: The Next Generation character Captain Jean-Luc Picard in "Peter's Got Woods" (season 4, episode 11); Jonathan Frakes, Michael Dorn and Marina Sirtis also appeared in "Peter's Got Woods" as their respective Star Trek: The Next Generation characters William Riker, Worf, and Counsellor Deanna Troi.

"Not All Dogs Go to Heaven" features the entire original cast of Star Trek: The Next Generation: Stewart as Captain Picard; Frakes as Riker; Gates McFadden as Doctor Beverly Crusher; Brent Spiner as Lieutenant Commander Data; Dorn as Worf; Sirtis as Troi; LeVar Burton as Chief Engineer Geordi La Forge; Wil Wheaton as Wesley Crusher; and Denise Crosby, whose character Tasha Yar died during Star Trek: The Next Generation's first season. It is also the first time the cast, minus Crosby, has worked together since the 2002 feature film Star Trek Nemesis, although the actors did not meet when they recorded their speaking parts. Including Crosby, the last time that the entire cast worked together was the 1990 episode "Yesterday's Enterprise".

Wil Wheaton, who played Wesley Crusher on Star Trek: The Next Generation, recorded his parts for the episode on September 20, 2007. Seth MacFarlane directed the recording sessions with the guest stars.

== Reception ==
"Not All Dogs Go to Heaven" received a 4.8/7 Nielsen Rating.

Ahsan Haque of IGN called the episode "surprisingly refreshing", saying the scenes with the Star Trek cast lived up to expectations. He also found "Meg's journey of seeking acceptance through religion" well handled. Steve Heisler of The A.V. Club gave the episode a C grade, criticized "Not All Dogs Go to Heaven" as boring and formulaic and stated that the writers "have no idea how to best use Meg".
