= Big Brother (British TV series) series 10 =

Coordinates: 51°39′23″N 0°16′02″W

Big Brother
- Series 10
- Series ten logo
- Presented by: Davina McCall
- No. of days: 93
- No. of housemates: 22
- Winner: Sophie Reade
- Runner-up: Siavash Sabbaghpour
- Companion shows: Big Brother's Little Brother; Big Brother's Big Mouth; Big Brother Live
- No. of episodes: 108

Release
- Original network: Channel 4
- Original release: 4 June – 4 September 2009

Series chronology
- ← Previous; Series 9 Next → Series 11

Big Brother 2009, also known as Big Brother 10, is the tenth series of the British reality television series Big Brother. The show followed a total of twenty-two contestants, who were isolated from the outside world for an extended period of time in a custom built House. Each week, one or more of the housemates were evicted by a public vote. The last remaining housemate, Sophie Reade, was declared the winner, winning a cash prize of £71,320.

The series launched on Channel 4 on 4 June 2009 and ended on 4 September 2009, lasting 93 days – the joint-second longest British edition of Big Brother to date (together with the seventh and ninth series, and one day shorter than the eighth series). Davina McCall returned as presenter for her tenth consecutive year. Sixteen housemates entered on launch night, with an additional six being introduced in later weeks.

Big Brother 10 was watched by an average of 2.5 million viewers. It was the lowest rated series of the show since its inception, becoming the first series to draw an average of less than 3 million, and remains the lowest rated series of Big Brother to be broadcast on Channel 4. During the series, Channel 4 announced that it would not be renewing its contract to show the series with Endemol once it expired in 2010, meaning that the subsequent eleventh series would be the last to be broadcast on Channel 4.

== Format ==
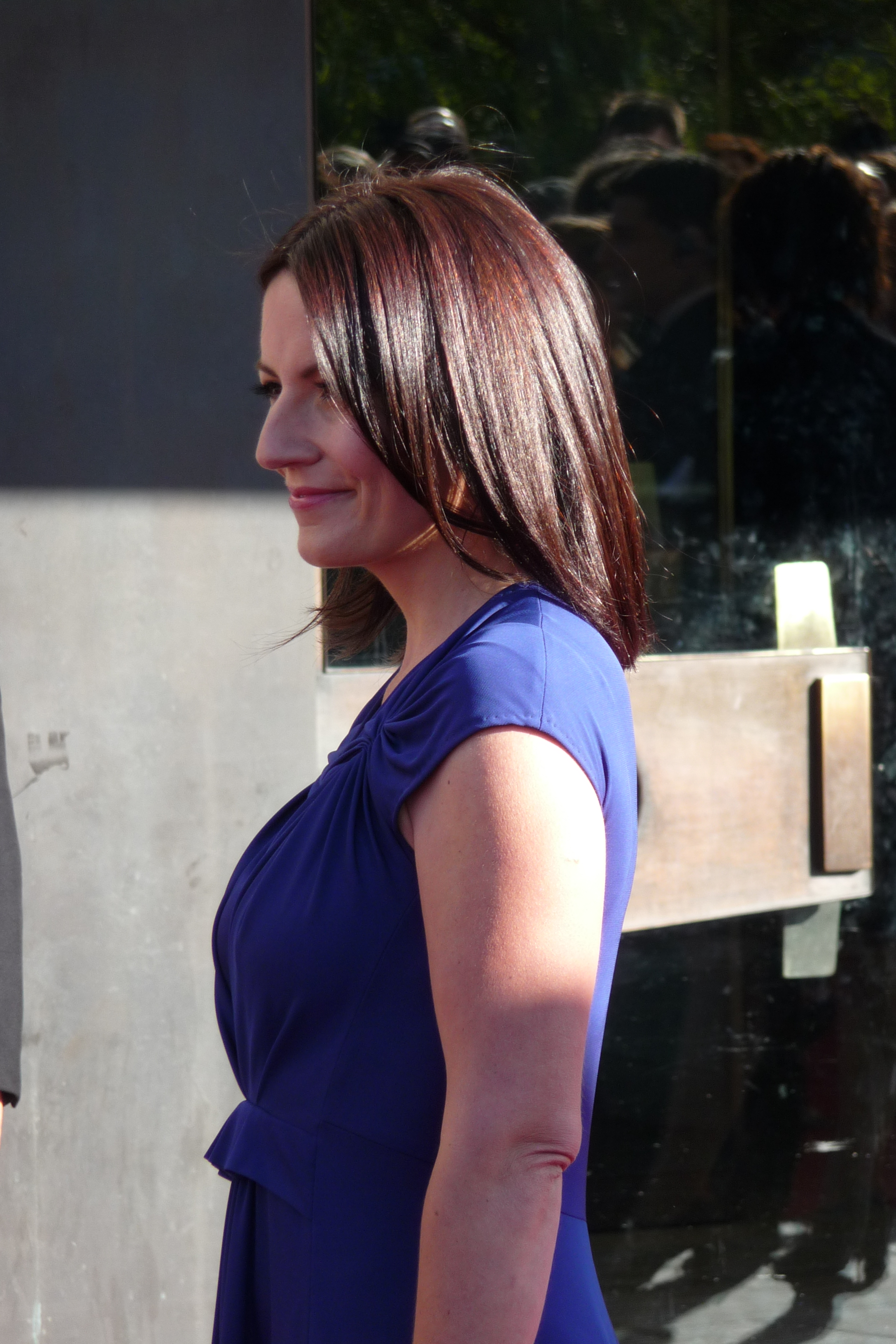
After a housemate was evicted, they were subject to an interview with Davina McCall.

The format remained largely unchanged from previous series. Housemates were incarcerated in the Big Brother House with no contact to and from the outside world. Each week, the housemates took part in a compulsory task that determined the amount of money they were allocated to spend on their shopping; if they passed, they received a luxury budget and they were allocated a basic budget if they failed. Housemates were instructed to nominate two fellow housemates for eviction each week. This compulsory vote was conducted in the privacy of the Diary Room and housemates were not allowed to discuss the nomination process or influence the nominations of others. On Day 68, Big Brother changed the rules to allow housemates to discuss nominations until further notice. The two or more housemates who gathered the most nominations per week faced a public vote and the housemate receiving the most votes was evicted from the House on the Friday and interviewed by Davina McCall. Housemates could voluntarily leave the House at any time and those who broke the rules could have been ejected by Big Brother.

In a change from previous series, Channel 4 announced that it would no longer donate any of its income from the premium-rate telephone lines, by which viewers vote for whom they would like to see evicted or win the programme, to charitable organisations. The broadcaster said that the current economic downturn is to blame for this decision and that the change would bring Big Brother into line with other programmes of its kind, such as The X Factor and Strictly Come Dancing. The format of the live eviction interview programme was altered for this series. Unlike previous series in which McCall interviewed evicted housemates by herself, she was instead joined by two guest panellists to "interrogate" the evictee. Panellists included former housemates, journalists, psychologists, and fans of the programme. A new rule was added to the programme at the start of the series; "fake romances" were not permitted.

== Housemates ==
Big Brother 10 saw 22 contestants competing to win. Sixteen participants entered the House on Day 1 and an additional five housemates entered the House on Day 44, followed by one other on Day 56.

Name	Age on entry	Hometown	Day entered	Day exited	Result	Refs
Sophie "Dogface" Reade	20	Nantwich, Cheshire	1	93	Winner	
Siavash Sabbaghpour	23	London (originally from Iran)	1	93	Runner-up	
David Ramsden	28	Dewsbury	44	93	3rd place	
Charlie Drummond	22	Newcastle	1	93	4th place	
Rodrigo Lopes	23	Leeds (originally from Brazil)	1	93	5th place	
Lisa Wallace	41	Birmingham	1	90	Evicted	
Marcus Akin	35	London	1	86	Evicted	
Rebecca "Bea" Hamill	24	Bristol	44	79	Evicted	
Freddie "Halfwit" Fisher	23	Market Drayton	1	72	Evicted	
Hira Habibshah	25	Dublin (originally from Pakistan)	44	65	Evicted	
Isaac Stout	23	Cleveland, United States	56	58	Walked	
Nóirín Kelly	25	Dublin	1	58	Evicted	
Tom Oliver	27	Northampton	44	53	Walked	
Kenneth Tong	24	Edinburgh (originally from Hong Kong)	44	50	Walked	
Karly Ashworth	21	Fife	1	44	Evicted	
Kris Donnelly	24	Shrewsbury	1	37	Evicted	
Sreedhara "Sree" Dasari	25	Hatfield (originally from India)	1	30	Evicted	
Elena "Angel McKenzie" Chebotareva	35	London (originally from the Russian Federation)	1	23	Evicted	
Cairon Austin-Hill	18	London (originally from the United States)	1	16	Evicted	
Sophia Brown	26	London	1	9	Evicted	
Saffia Corden	27	Nottingham	1	8	Walked	
Beinazir Lasharie	28	London (originally from Pakistan)	1	4	Evicted	

== Nominations table ==
	Week 1		Week 2	Week 3	Week 4	Week 5	Week 6	Week 7	Week 8	Week 9	Week 10	Week 11	Week 12	Week 13			Nominations received
	Day 4	Day 6	Week 2	Week 3	Week 4	Week 5	Week 6	Week 7	Week 8	Week 9	Week 10	Week 11	Week 12	Day 88	Final		Nominations received
Sophie Dogface	Housemate	Charlie, Sree	Halfwit, Marcus	Angel, Halfwit	Halfwit, Marcus	Halfwit, Marcus	Marcus, Nóirín	Marcus	Hira, Marcus	~~Marcus,~~; ~~Halfwit~~	Marcus, Halfwit	Rodrigo, Bea	David, Marcus	Refused	Winner (Day 93)		6
Siavash	Non- Housemate	Charlie, Halfwit	Charlie, Lisa	Angel, Sree	Sree, Kris	Charlie, Lisa	Nóirín, Karly	Charlie, Lisa	Hira, Lisa	Refused	Bea, David	Bea, Sophie	Charlie, Sophie	Refused	Runner-up (Day 93)		20
David	Not in House							Failed mission	Nóirín, Marcus	~~Marcus,~~; ~~Bea~~	Halfwit, Marcus	Siavash, Marcus	Siavash, Marcus	~~Siavash,~~; ~~Sophie~~	Third place (Day 93)		14
Charlie	Housemate	Sophia, Halfwit	Halfwit, Marcus	Banned	Halfwit, Siavash	Marcus, Rodrigo	Marcus, Nóirín	Halfwit, Siavash	Nóirín, Siavash	~~Siavash,~~; ~~Halfwit~~	Halfwit, Marcus	Siavash, Marcus	Siavash, Marcus	Refused	Fourth place (Day 93)		10
Rodrigo	Housemate	Cairon, Siavash	Cairon, Halfwit	Halfwit, Sree	Sree, Halfwit	Marcus, Halfwit	Lisa, Karly	Nóirín, Marcus	Nóirín, Marcus	~~Marcus,~~; ~~Bea~~	Halfwit, Marcus	Bea, David	Siavash, Marcus	Lisa, David	Fifth place (Day 93)		5
Lisa	Housemate	Halfwit, Karly	Marcus, Halfwit	Angel, Halfwit	Marcus, Halfwit	Marcus, Halfwit	Nóirín, Marcus	Halfwit, Nóirín	Nóirín, Bea	~~Bea,~~; ~~Marcus~~	Halfwit, Marcus	Bea, Marcus	Siavash, Marcus	~~Siavash,~~; Rodrigo	Evicted (Day 90)		26
Marcus	Non- Housemate	Lisa, Sree	Lisa, Halfwit	Sree, Lisa	Sree, Lisa	Lisa, Halfwit	Lisa, Karly	Lisa, Charlie	Hira, Nóirín	~~Dogface,~~; ~~David~~	David, Bea	David, Bea	David, Sophie	Evicted (Day 86)			46
Bea	Not in House							Failed mission	David, Lisa	~~David,~~; ~~Lisa~~	Marcus, David	Rodrigo, David	Evicted (Day 79)				12
Freddie Halfwit	Housemate	Sree, Lisa	Sree, Lisa	Kris, Sree	Sree, Lisa	Nóirín, Lisa	Lisa, Karly	Charlie, Lisa	Charlie, Lisa	~~Lisa,~~; ~~David~~	Marcus, David	Evicted (Day 72)					45
Hira	Not in House							Failed mission	Marcus, Siavash	~~Bea,~~; ~~Marcus~~	Evicted (Day 65)						3
Isaac	Not in House									Walked (Day 58)							N/A
Nóirín	Housemate	Halfwit, Sophia	Halfwit, Cairon	Angel, Halfwit	Halfwit, Sree	Halfwit, Siavash	Karly, Lisa	Rodrigo, Lisa	Marcus, Lisa	Evicted (Day 58)							15
Tom	Not in House							Failed mission	Walked (Day 53)								N/A
Kenneth	Not in House							Failed mission	Walked (Day 50)								N/A
Karly	Housemate	Halfwit, Marcus	Halfwit, Angel	Angel, Halfwit	Halfwit, Marcus	Halfwit, Marcus	Nóirín, Marcus	Evicted (Day 44)									6
Kris	Housemate	Halfwit, Sophia	Halfwit, Angel	Angel, Halfwit	Halfwit, Siavash	Halfwit, Siavash	Evicted (Day 37)										2
Sree	Non- Housemate	Sophia, Marcus	Cairon, Halfwit	Halfwit, Siavash	Marcus, Nóirín	Evicted (Day 30)											16
Angel	Non- Housemate	Dogface, Sophia	Cairon, Siavash	Sree, Siavash	Evicted (Day 23)												9
Cairon	Housemate	Sree, Charlie	Angel, Sree	Evicted (Day 16)													5
Sophia	Non- Housemate	Saffia, Nóirín	Evicted (Day 9)														6
Saffia	Housemate	Sophia, Marcus	Walked (Day 8)														1
Beinazir	Non- Housemate	Evicted (Day 4)															N/A
Notes	1	none		2	none	3	4	5	none	6	7	8	9	10	11		
Against public vote	Angel, Beinazir, Marcus, Siavash, Sophia, Sree	Halfwit, Sophia	Cairon, Halfwit	Angel, Halfwit	Halfwit, Sree	Charlie, Dogface, Halfwit, Kris, Marcus	Dogface, Karly, Nóirín, Siavash	Bea, Charlie, David, Dogface, Halfwit, Hira, ~~Kenneth~~, Marcus, Nóirín, Siavash, Tom	Marcus, Nóirín	Bea, Charlie, David, Dogface, Halfwit, Hira, Lisa, Marcus, Rodrigo, Siavash	Halfwit, Marcus	Bea, David, Marcus	Marcus, Siavash	Charlie, David, Lisa, Rodrigo, Siavash, Sophie	Charlie, David, Rodrigo, Siavash, Sophie		
Walked	none	Saffia	none					Kenneth	Tom, Isaac	none							
Evicted	Beinazir; 6.8% to be a housemate	Sophia; 91.2% to evict	Cairon; 73.2% to evict	Angel; 81.0% to evict	Sree; 85.0% to evict	Kris; 63.0% to evict	Karly; 50.4% to evict	Eviction cancelled	Nóirín; 60.0% to evict	Hira; 5.7% to save	Freddie; 53.6% to evict	Bea; 88.2% to evict	Marcus; 64.0% to evict	Lisa; 68.6% to evict	Rodrigo; 11.0% (out of 5)	Charlie; 13.2% (out of 5)	
Evicted	Beinazir; 6.8% to be a housemate	Sophia; 91.2% to evict	Cairon; 73.2% to evict	Angel; 81.0% to evict	Sree; 85.0% to evict	Kris; 63.0% to evict	Karly; 50.4% to evict	Eviction cancelled	Nóirín; 60.0% to evict	Hira; 5.7% to save	Freddie; 53.6% to evict	Bea; 88.2% to evict	Marcus; 64.0% to evict	Lisa; 68.6% to evict	David; 19.0% (out of 3)	Siavash; 25.6% (out of 2)	
Evicted	Beinazir; 6.8% to be a housemate	Sophia; 91.2% to evict	Cairon; 73.2% to evict	Angel; 81.0% to evict	Sree; 85.0% to evict	Kris; 63.0% to evict	Karly; 50.4% to evict	Eviction cancelled	Nóirín; 60.0% to evict	Hira; 5.7% to save	Freddie; 53.6% to evict	Bea; 88.2% to evict	Marcus; 64.0% to evict	Lisa; 68.6% to evict	Sophie; 74.4% to win		
Source																	

Notes

- ^Note 1: As they did not achieve housemate status by successfully completing a challenge, Angel, Beinazir, Marcus, Siavash, Sophia and Sree faced a public vote on Day 4 to decide which five remaining non-housemates would be given housemate status. Beinazir received the fewest votes and was therefore evicted.
- ^Note 2: Siavash, playing King Henry VIII in the week's shopping task, was called upon to ban one housemate from nominating and to grant another immunity. He chose Charlie and Marcus respectively.
- ^Note 3: As punishment for discussing nominations, Charlie, Dogface and Kris had to remain silent for several hours or they would automatically face eviction. All three failed this task and automatically faced eviction.
- ^Note 4: As punishment for discussing nominations, Dogface and Siavash were told not to swear for several hours or they would automatically face eviction. They failed to do so and therefore automatically faced eviction. As this took place before nominations, they were ineligible to be nominated by their fellow housemates.
- ^Note 5: As new housemates, Bea, David, Hira, Kenneth and Tom could not nominate and could not be nominated by their fellow housemates. However, they were set a secret mission, in which they had to get Halfwit and Nóirín (who were randomly chosen by Hira) nominated for eviction by the other housemates. Failure meant automatically facing the public vote. Charlie and Lisa received the most nominations, therefore the new housemates failed their mission and faced eviction themselves. As punishment for discussing nominations, Charlie, Dogface (who also failed to nominate the required two people for eviction this week), Halfwit, Marcus, Nóirín and Siavash also faced the public vote and Big Brother voided all nominations. Therefore, Lisa and Rodrigo were the only two housemates not to face eviction this week. The eviction was later cancelled due to Kenneth walking from the house. During the time the lines were available to vote, Kenneth had received the most votes.
- ^Note 6: Bea and Marcus received the most nominations, however Big Brother declared the result void due to Marcus attempting to influence his fellow housemates on several occasions and Siavash refusing to nominate. As punishment, all housemates faced the public vote. Unlike previous weeks, this week was a vote to save.
- ^Note 7: On Day 72, Big Brother announced to Halfwit and Dogface that they would revert their names back by deed poll to Freddie and Sophie respectively. As he was evicted on the evening of that same day, the table lists Freddie and not Halfwit as the tenth person to be evicted.
- ^Note 8: Siavash and Sophie both refused to nominate. As punishment Big Brother decided, without telling them, that the first two housemates with whom Siavash made physical contact and the first two that Sophie named after leaving the Diary Room would be deemed to be their nominations. Siavash touched Bea and Sophie, and Sophie named Rodrigo and Bea. Therefore, Bea received an additional two nominations and Sophie and Rodrigo each received one extra nomination.
- ^Note 9: As a warning to anyone considering to disrupt the nominations process this week, Big Brother chose Charlie and Sophie at random and announced to the House that they would each automatically receive one nomination from anyone refusing to nominate.
- ^Note 10: Any housemate who refused to nominate this week was automatically put up for eviction.
- ^Note 11: There were no nominations after Lisa's eviction on Day 90. The public voted for whom they wanted to win, rather than evict.

== Weekly summary ==
Week 1	Entrances	On Day 1, Freddie, Lisa, Sophie, Kris, Nóirín, Cairon, Angel, Karly, Marcus, Beinazir, Sophia, Rodrigo, Charlie, Saffia, Sree and Siavash entered the house.
Week 1	Twists	On Day 1, it was revealed that the 16 people in the house were non-housemates and had to earn their housemate status in order to stay in the house. Over the next three days, the non-housemates would face a series of tasks, with those completing it earning housemate status and full access to the house. All non-housemates were to wear a special uniform to designate their status and had to wear it at all times. Any housemate who did not succeed at these tasks would face a public vote on Day 4, with viewers deciding on who would become a housemate; the person with the fewest votes would be unceremoniously evicted.
Week 1	Tasks	Rodrigo had to convince Nóirín to have him shave her eyebrows and apply a curly mustache and glasses on her face with a permanent marker. Nóirín had to reapply this drawing on her face when necessary until further notice. They successfully passed this task and earned housemate status.; Lisa answered a ringing phone in the communal area. After gaining housemate status, she then had 15 minutes to select another person to become a housemate. She chose Kris, and he also became a housemate.; Charlie and Saffia had to walk barefoot over broken sugar glass, believing it to be real glass. They successfully passed this task and earned housemate status.; Karly was tricked in to believing that a motorbike was being ridden over her stomach. She successfully passed this task and earned housemate status.; Freddie and Sophie agreed to change their names by deed poll and be legally known as Halfwit and Dogface respectively until further notice. They then earned housemate status.; The remaining non-housemates competed in a biscuit dunking competition, where they had to dunk a biscuit into tea for as long as possible without it disintegrating. Cairon dunked his biscuit in his tea for the longest time and earned housemate status.; Because Angel, Beinazir, Marcus, Siavash, Sophia and Sree failed to earn housemate status, they all faced the public vote.
Week 1	Tasks	This week's shopping saw Kris negotiate his way through a field of laser beams to retrieve the "Emerald of Hope", with one of his fellow housemates being soaked by a bursting balloon full of gunge whenever he interrupted a beam. He completed the task successfully, earning a luxury budget.
Week 1	Punishments	As punishment for Marcus, Sophia and Sree discussing nominations, Big Brother doubled the price of every item on the shopping list.
Week 1	Nominations	For failing to earn housemate status, Angel, Beinazir, Marcus, Siavash, Sophia and Sree faced the public vote.; On Day 6, the housemates nominated for the first time. Halfwit and Sophia received the most nominations and faced the public vote.
Week 1	Exits	On Day 4, Beinazir was evicted from the house, receiving 6.8% of the public vote to become a housemate.; On Day 8, Saffia walked from the house.; On Day 9, Sophia was evicted from the house, receiving 91.2% of the public vote to evict.
Week 2
Week 2	Tasks	This week's shopping task required the housemates to learn and perform the song and dance routine "Me Ol' Bamboo" from the film Chitty Chitty Bang Bang. They passed and won a luxury shopping budget of £5 per person per day.; On Day 10, housemates participated in a task where Cairon and Charlie were blindfolded and dressed as a pantomime bull. Guided by Siavash's voice (who was seated in the dining room), they had 2 minutes to enter the task room—which was lined with red and white ceramic plates—and smash at least 10 red plates to win four tokens. Having smashed 19 red plates, the group passed the task.; On Day 11, six housemates were transformed into dancing flowers. They had to dance for at least 3 hours, 27 minutes, 8 seconds (of which this time was not made privy to them) to win four tokens for the group. As the dancing flowers danced for 5 hours, 45 minutes, they passed the task.
Week 2	Nominations	On Day 12, the housemates nominated for the second time. Cairon and Halfwit received the most nominations and faced the public vote.
Week 2	Exits	On Day 16, Cairon was evicted from the house, receiving 73.2% of the public vote to evict.
Week 3
Week 3	Tasks	On Day 17, Big Brother set the housemates a Russian task, where they had to translate sentences and phrases correctly in Russian to win two tokens. As a native Russian speaker, Angel could help with revision and could also participate in the task. The group passed their task.; On Day 18, Big Brother threw a day-long, hippie and summer solstice-themed celebration of Halfwit's 24th birthday. All housemates had to participate in all events of Halfwit's birthday celebrations to Big Brother's satisfaction to win eight tokens for the group. They passed, winning the eight tokens as well as food and drink for a party later that day.; This week's shopping task was Tudor-themed, where housemates had to portray historic figures and partake in activities of that time period, like singing a madrigal, and dancing the volta. Housemates failed all tasks involved and won a basic shopping budget for the week.
Week 3	Twists	As part of his birthday celebrations, Big Brother presented Halfwit with the "Gift of Normality," in which he could keep for himself or give to Nóirín or Dogface. Halfwit chose Nóirín, freeing her from the obligation to draw a moustache and glasses on her face every day.; As part of the Tudor-themed shopping task, Siavash, playing the part of Henry VIII, was called to ban one housemate from nominating and grant another immunity from eviction. He chose Charlie and Marcus respectively.
Week 3	Nominations	On Day 21, the housemates nominated for the third time. Angel and Halfwit received the most nominations and faced the public vote.
Week 3	Exits	On Day 23, Angel was evicted from the house, receiving 81% of the public vote to evict.
Week 4
Week 4	Tasks	On Day 25, housemates competed in an extreme Sports Day task; they were split into two teams and competed in a best-of-five-event match. The team of Nóirín, Sophie, Lisa, Charlie and Rodrigo won themselves a school disco party. Marcus, as referee of the games, was also invited, having correctly predicted who would win the Sports Day. However, as all housemates participated to Big Brother's satisfaction, the group was awarded 3 tokens.; This week's shopping task was Italian-themed. Siavash played the role of a fashionista who was required to change his outfit at Big Brother's request and strike a pose whenever Madonna's "Vogue" was played into the House. Karly, Halfwit and Rodrigo had to perform Nessum dorma in the style of the Three Tenors. Sree and Dogface's contribution was to run a 24-hour ice cream delivery service, while Marcus and Nóirín created paintings based on the works of Leonardo da Vinci and Sandro Botticelli. Charlie and Kris played Italian footballers and Lisa had to predict football scores correctly. Housemates passed and won a luxury shopping budget for the week.
Week 4	Nominations	On Day 26, the housemates nominated for the fourth time. Halfwit and Sree received the most nominations and faced the public vote.
Week 4	Exits	On Day 30, Sree was evicted from the house, receiving 85% of the public vote to evict.
Week 5
Week 5	Tasks	On Day 31, Rodrigo was given a secret mission to convince one housemate to get on their hands and knees and bark like a dog within 30 minutes. As he successfully convinced Dogface, Rodrigo won a hamper of goodies and one token.; On Day 32, housemates competed to see who was the fastest, with a crash test simulator set up in the garden and housemates grouped in teams to compete against each other. The team of Dogface, Halfwit and Kris won a party for themselves, where they had to eat burgers, drink alcohol, and continuous dance for one hour to win tokens for the house. They won five tokens.; The housemates had a circus-themed shopping task for this week. Having failed it, they received a basic shopping budget.
Week 5	Punishments	On Day 33, as punishment for discussing nominations, Charlie, Dogface and Kris were told to keep quiet for the rest of the day, or face the public vote. Having failed to keep quiet, they joined Halfwit and Marcus up for eviction.
Week 5	Nominations	The housemates nominated for the fifth time. Halfwit and Marcus received the most nominations and faced the public vote. As a punishment for discussing nominations, Charlie, Dogface and Kris also faced the public vote.
Week 5	Exits	On Day 37, Kris was evicted from the house, receiving 63.0% of the public vote to evict.
Week 6
Week 6	Tasks	For their shopping task, as part of the 10th anniversary celebrations of Big Brother, housemates competed against former housemates in tasks featured in the nine previous civilian series. Housemates failed, and received a basic shopping budget for the week.
Week 6	Punishments	On Day 39, as punishment for discussing nominations the week prior, Dogface and Siavash were told not to swear for five and a half hours or face the public vote. As they both failed to do so, they joined Karly and Nóirín in facing eviction.
Week 6	Nominations	The housemates nominated for the sixth time. Karly and Nóirín received the most nominations and faced the public vote. Due to discussing nominations, Dogface and Siavash also faced the public vote.
Week 6	Exits	On Day 44, Karly was evicted from the house, receiving 50.4% of the public vote to evict.
Week 7
Week 7	Entrances	On Day 44, Bea, David, Hira, Kenneth and Tom entered the house.
Week 7	Twists	Shortly after their entry on Day 44, Big Brother set the new housemates a secret mission to avoid facing eviction next week: to ensure that Halfwit and Nóirín (randomly selected by Hira in the Diary Room) received the most nomination votes. If they failed, they would all face eviction.
Week 7	Tasks	As a conclusion to the 10th anniversary celebrations that took place last week, Big Brother treated the housemates to a party on Day 45.; Housemates took part in a Greek-themed shopping task with a twist, which involved learning choreography by Stavros Flatley—a dance duo featured on Britain's Got Talent—running a kebab shop, learning the movements of the Greek presidential guards, and portraying Greek gods. However, playing Zeus, Halfwit was the only housemate aware of the true nature of the shopping task. In each of three challenges he had to ensure, while still keeping the secret, that his chosen champion defeated the appropriate Greek god. As he failed, housemates received a basic shopping budget.
Week 7	Punishments	On Day 50, as punishment for aiding Kenneth in escaping the house through the roof, Big Brother sent Marcus to the jail in the garden.; On Day 51, as punishment for discussing nominations, Big Brother sent Tom to jail.
Week 7	Nominations	The housemates nominated for the seventh time. Charlie and Lisa received the most nominations and faced the public vote. However, as Bea, David, Hira, Kenneth and Tom failed their secret mission in ensuring Halfwit and Nóirín received the most nominations, they faced eviction. Furthermore, as punishment for Charlie, Dogface, Marcus, Nóirín and Siavash discussing nominations (as well as Dogface failing to nominate two people for eviction), Big Brother voided all nominations, and all housemates, except for Lisa and Rodrigo, faced the public vote.
Week 7	Exits	On Day 49, Kenneth walked from the house. As a result, the eviction scheduled for the following day was cancelled.
Week 8
Week 8	Entrances	On Day 56, Isaac entered the house.
Week 8	Tasks	On Day 53, housemates took part in a quiz to win items for a party later that day. They also won four tokens, but forfeited them due to Marcus calling Big Brother a wanker and destroying the task props.; For the shopping task, the housemates split into two groups, creating human puppets with one housemate providing the head and feet and another providing the arms, and making them dance to music by Girls Aloud and Take That. Visitors to the Big Brother web site decided by voting that the housemates had failed the task.
Week 8	Nominations	The housemates nominated for the eighth time. Marcus and Nóirín received the most nominations and faced the public vote.
Week 8	Exits	On Day 52, Tom walked from the house.; On Day 57, Nóirín was evicted from the house, receiving 60% of the public vote to evict.; On Day 58, Isaac walked from the house.
Week 9
Week 9	Tasks	On Day 59, housemates held a talent competition, and voted on who they thought was most and least entertaining. Hira and Dogface won these awards respectively.; The shopping task was based on Lewis Carroll's Victorian children's novel Alice's Adventures in Wonderland in which Hira, in the role of Alice, having first been "shrunk" in the Diary Room, spent more than five hours searching for a key buried inside a giant cupcake using only her face. The housemates passed the task and received a luxury shopping budget.
Week 9	Nominations	The housemates nominated for the ninth time. Bea, David and Marcus received the most nominations and faced the public vote.
Week 9	Punishments	As punishment for Marcus attempting to influence nominations and for Siavash refusing to nominate, Big Brother voided all nominations this week, and all housemates instead faced the public vote. Housemates were unaware that the public would instead be voting to save, not evict.
Week 9	Exits	On Day 65, Hira was evicted from the house, receiving 5.7% of the public vote to save.
Week 10
Week 10	Tasks	The housemates took part in a "Best of British" shopping task in which they had to bog snorkel, play the bagpipes and convince Rodrigo he had met the Queen, who was in fact the impersonator Janette Charles. Housemates won £240 for the shopping budget. Furthermore, as a reward for passing, housemate received letters from home, and each housemate won a personalized prize. These included: Rodrigo winning a personal letter and teacup from Buckingham Palace; Marcus being given one hour to recreate his housemate profile photo, as well as fan mail which he would reply to with a signed copy of his new profile photo; Charlie receiving 30 minutes of Girls Aloud music in the Diary Room; and Halfwit and Dogface legally changing their names back to Freddie and Sophie respectively.
Week 10	Twists	Following continuous rule breaking by a number of housemates, Big Brother decided to permit the discussion of nominations until further notice.
Week 10	Punishments	On Day 72, as punishment for not wearing her microphone, Big Brother sent Bea to jail.
Week 10	Nominations	The housemates nominated for the tenth time. Halfwit and Marcus received the most nominations and faced the public vote.
Week 10	Exits	On Day 72, Freddie was evicted from the house, receiving 53.6% of the public vote to evict.
Week 11
Week 11	Tasks	On Day 73, housemates participated in an alphabet-themed task, where they had name as many words as possible in 60 seconds beginning with a randomly selected letter of the alphabet. Siavash won this task, and was rewarded with a hamper of items beginning with S, the letter he randomly selected.; In the House of Horrors-themed shopping task Charlie, in the role of Dr Frankenstein, played a version of the game Operation in which Bea, playing his Monster, received a shock whenever his hand faltered. Housemates passed the overall task and won a luxury shopping budget for the week.
Week 11	Punishments	As punishment for refusing to nominate, Big Brother decided, without telling them, that the first two housemates that Siavash made physical contact with and the first two housemates Sophie named would be their nominations for the week.
Week 11	Nominations	The housemates nominated for the eleventh time. Bea, David and Marcus received the most nominations and faced the public vote.
Week 11	Exits	On Day 79, Bea was evicted from the house, receiving 88.2% of the public vote to evict.
Week 12
Week 12	Tasks	On Day 80, housemates took part in an oil wrestling championship. Siavash won and received a championship belt.; On Day 81, housemates took part in a task where they had to brush their teeth for one minute with disgusting food items, like stinky cheese, pureed cat food, and shrimp paste. Housemates won six tokens, but lost out on a collection of their favourite music, due to Sophie failing to complete the task to Big Brother's satisfaction.; On Day 82, Sophie took part in a geography quiz, identifying countries of the world on a map. She won music for Rodrigo and Charlie to be played into the house later that day.; The housemates participated in a future-related shopping task during week twelve, in which Sophie and Rodrigo learned a robotic dance routine to Daft Punk's song "Harder, Better, Faster, Stronger,"Lisa and David left the House with instructions to have photographs taken by members of the public in front of three London landmarks whilst dressed as aliens, Charlie was tested on his knowledge of constellations and Siavash and Marcus had to create an effigy of Big Brother with recycled materials as well as compose and perform an original song. All housemates had to also ensure a light bulb was continuously illuminated by pedalling a stationary bicycle for about seven hours. Housemates passed all aspects of the tasks and won a luxury shopping budget.; During the shopping task on Day 83, Big Brother tasked Charlie, Siavash, Marcus, Rodrigo and Sophie to be entertaining, after finding them boring. They then decided to attempt to escape the house. As housemates succeeded in their task, but breached rules to do so, housemates were not given a reward.; Housemates were given the chance over the next ten days to win back money to the prize fund.; On Day 85, housemates won a £20 cheque after requesting a mystery prize from the weekly shopping list. However, Marcus rejected a £15,000 offer to cut off his ponytail, and the group rejected a £1,500 offer to swim 1,500 lengths of the pool.; On Day 85, Siavash accepted an offer of £10,000 towards the prize fund for exchanging all his clothes with an outfit provided by Big Brother, that he had to wear until he left the house, and the amount would then be added to the prize fund. As Siavash finished runner-up and left the house in the outfit given to him by Big Brother, £10,000 was added to the prize fund during the live final show.; On Day 86, Rodrigo won £6,000 out of a possible £10,000 towards the prize fund by correctly guessing the regional locations of three animals after listening to a series of sound effects.
Week 12	Punishments	As punishment for refusing to nominate, Big Brother allocated Siavash's nominations to Sophie and Charlie, two housemates randomly chosen to receive votes on behalf of anyone attempting to disrupt the nominations.; Whilst Lisa and David were away from the house for their task, the remaining housemates attempted to break out of the house. Big Brother punished them by depleting the prize fund from £100,000 to £0, and let them know they had opportunities to win back the money over the course of the next few days.
Week 12	Nominations	The housemates nominated for the twelfth time. Marcus and Siavash received the most nominations and faced the public vote.
Week 12	Exits	On Day 86, Marcus was evicted from the house, receiving 64% of the vote to evict.
Week 13
Week 13	Tasks	The housemates continued attempting tasks to win back money to the prize fund.; On Day 87, housemates took in a "task with no name", where the housemates had four hours to solve several challenges and puzzles in the task room. They were unaware that these were mere diversions. The real task was to leave the room within four hours. They passed and successfully won £10,000 to the prize fund.; On Day 88, Big Brother showed the housemates a video compilation of their previous nominations, and set them a quiz on what they had seen in order to add money to the prize fund. The group answered 53 of the 60 questions correctly, gaining £5,300 to the prize fund.; On Day 91, Charlie, Rodrigo, Siavash and Sophie were instructed to rank themselves in different categories. David, who was isolated in the diary room, had to answer questions based on their answers. David answered 4 of the 10 questions correctly, gaining £40,000 to the prize fund.; On Day 89, the housemates were shown the episode of Big Brother which documented Day 50 in the House and were told to re-enact it over a five-hour period. They passed this task, earning a luxury shopping budget.; On Day 90, the housemates had to replicate the music video of "Single Ladies (Put a Ring on It)", a song by Beyoncé, in order to win a screening of the task they filmed yesterday. The group were successful, with David portraying Knowles, and were therefore rewarded with a screening of the task later that day, after the eviction.
Week 13	Nominations	On Day 88, the housemates nominated for thirteenth and final time. Big Brother warned housemates that anyone refusing to nominate would automatically face the public vote. Charlie, Siavash and Sophie refused to nominated, and Lisa, David and Rodrigo each received one nomination vote. As a result, all housemates faced the public vote.
Week 13	Exits	On Day 90, Lisa was evicted from the house, receiving 68.6% of the public vote to evict.; On Day 93, Rodrigo left the house in fifth place, Charlie left the house in fourth place and David left the house in third place. It was then revealed that Sophie was the winner, leaving Siavash as the runner-up.

== Production ==
This series was filmed at Elstree Studios.

Big Brother 10 was produced by Brighter Pictures, a division of Endemol. This series of the programme had been confirmed since 2006 as part of a £180 million contract between Endemol and Channel 4. Phil Edgar-Jones was the creative director of the series whilst Sharon Powers was the executive producer. Open auditions for the programme, which were confirmed during the final of Celebrity Big Brother 6, began on 3 January 2009 in Edinburgh and ended on 7 February in Manchester. Internet auditioning via YouTube, which saw 2,600 apply, ended on 3 February 2009. Auditionees were subjected to three interviews with various producers, additional meetings with a psychologist and a psychiatrist and a final "talk of doom", in which they were warned about the negative impact that appearing on Big Brother could have on their lives. In the weeks preceding the series, the selected housemates were put into "hiding" with no access to the outside world. Housemates were offered aftercare from the production team for up to six months after they left the programme.

=== Eye logo ===
The programme's logo, the Big Brother Eye, is based on a black, purple and blue thumbprint and was released on 11 May. It was designed by Daniel Eatock. From 19 May, Channel 4 began uploading teaser clips to the official Big Brother UK YouTube channel; these were also aired during commercial breaks on Channel 4 and its related channels. The series was sponsored by Lucozade Energy and the promotional break bumpers were created by M&C Saatchi and are based upon a 'little brother versus big brother' scenario. The programme began on 4 June, with a 95-minute special programme which introduced the initial 16 participants, and was broadcast on Channel 4 and E4 over a period of 93 days, concluding with the final on 4 September.

=== Broadcasts ===
The main television coverage of Big Brother 10 was screened using daily highlights programmes, narrated by Marcus Bentley. These episodes summarised the events of the previous day in the House. Alongside these highlights shows were spin-off programmes, Big Brother's Big Mouth and Big Brother's Little Brother, that commented on fandom, cultural reaction to the events within the House and included interviews with celebrities, former housemates and family and friends of housemates. On Fridays, a live eviction programme was hosted by Davina McCall in which the evicted contestant left the house and received an interview from McCall and two guests. For 2009, BBLB returned with George Lamb presenting five weekday evening programmes and one Sunday edition per week. Big Mouth was also fronted by McCall and was broadcast on E4 on Friday nights for an hour after the main eviction programme.

==== Interview panel ====
In a change to normal eviction interviews this series saw McCall and the evictee on a panel joined by two celebrity fans or psychologists, joining them were:

- Sophia Judi James and Dom Joly
- Cairon Iain Lee and Vanessa Feltz
- Angel Anthea Turner
- Sree Kelly Osbourne
- Kris Mel Blatt
- Karly Judi James and Kathy Burke
- Kenneth Terry Christian
- Nóirín Judi James and Jo Whiley
- Hira Emma Kennedy and Bob Mortimer
- Freddie Judi James and John McCririck
- Bea Ulrika Jonsson
- Marcus Grace Dent
- Lisa Dave Schneider and Kim Woodburn

The panel was not used for the finale, however, Judi James made a recorded segment about each finalist. The panel format was scrapped for the following celebrity and regular series, where McCall interviewed the evictee in the traditional format.

=== House ===
As with each series since Big Brother 2002, the programme was filmed at Elstree Studios in Borehamwood, Hertfordshire. A total of 27 editing suites, staffed by over 300 members of the production, were situated in the "George Lucas Stage" to produce the programme. In the 18 May issue of Star magazine, aerial photographs of the House were published, showing the garden under construction. Official pictures of the House interior were released by Channel 4 on 1 June, showing the entrance stairway, living room and garden. The entrance stairway had images of insects on its walls whilst the garden and living room had a science fiction theme; the former included a bus stop as the designated smoking area. On 3 June, Metro published an image of the Diary Room, which has a multicoloured chair and wall pattern. There was also a shipping container-based bathroom, a sitting room with red sofas, a wood panelled kitchen with purple, black and white fittings and a bedroom with splats of paint covering the walls. The house contained 44 cameras, 75 two-way mirrors and 57 fixed microphones, as well as individual microphones for each housemate.

=== Tenth year commemorations ===
==== Additional programming ====
Three special, one-off programmes aired on E4 before the launch to commemorate ten years of the programme. The first of which, entitled Jade: As Seen On TV aired on 26 May and commented on the life of Big Brother 2002 contestant Jade Goody and the infamy that surrounded her. The most successful Big Brother housemate worldwide, Goody died of cervical cancer two months before the programme aired. The programme was watched by 305,000 people; 1.8% of the TV audience.

Big Brother's Big Quiz, hosted by Davina McCall, aired on 29 May and featured celebrity team captains singer Jamelia, TV presenter and Celebrity Big Brother winner Ulrika Jonsson and comedians Danny Wallace and Jack Whitehall. It also featured former Big Brother housemates such as Craig Phillips and Sam and Amanda Marchant.

Big Brother: A Decade in the Headlines was transmitted on 30 May and looked back at the social, political and cultural changes that Big Brother had made to society since it began. The documentary was hosted by Grace Dent and featured participation from Mark Frith, Carole Malone, Oona King, Peter Tatchell, Krishnan Guru-Murthy and Ian Hyland.

Spin-off programme Big Brother's Little Brother featured new competitions and features to mark the event. The first, The George Lamb Quiz of the Decade, was launched on 7 June. The participants had to show their knowledge of the programme by participating in a quiz relating to every series of Big Brother. Another competition was established as part of the Greek-themed task in week eight. Here, male Big Brother's Little Brother viewers were asked to apply to become a date for Bea Hammill, who was playing the role of Aphrodite. The contestant chosen was Robin from Bristol. The programme also offered a viewer the chance to become Big Brother and talk to the housemates via the Diary Room on the final day of the programme; this was won by Simon "Jobby" Jobson, a 22-year-old DJ from Alnwick, Northumberland. Former housemates, such as Nadia Almada and Rachel Rice, also appeared as guests to mark the occasion.

=== Week seven shopping task ===
The shopping task for week seven saw housemates from the previous nine series temporarily return, as current housemates competed against them in a series of "classic" tasks. Former housemates were not paid; a donation was made to Jade Goody's trust fund instead. Phillips was drafted in after "Nasty" Nick Bateman withdrew. Later that day, Lisa competed in a task to build a sugar cube tower alongside Dean O'Loughlin of series two. Day 41 saw Alex Sibley, Sophie Pritchard and Lee Davey from the programme's third edition compete in a re-creation of the egg and spoon race task with Rodrigo trying to predict the outcome. Later that day, Federico Martone from series four participated in a gymkhana competition against Nóirín using fake horses and Dogface and Michelle Bass both sang Pie Jesu, which featured in the wedding task of series five, with viewers deciding which performance was the best. On Day 42, Craig Coates and Makosi Musambasi challenged Siavash to the box task from the sixth series and series seven's Nikki Grahame reenacted her silent disco task alongside Karly. The task drew to a close on Day 43 when Rex Newmark from the previous series returned to participate in the electric shock task with Marcus, in which the rest of housemates were subjected to shocks. The housemates failed to pass the required minimum of seven of the nine challenges and therefore failed the overall task.

== Reception ==
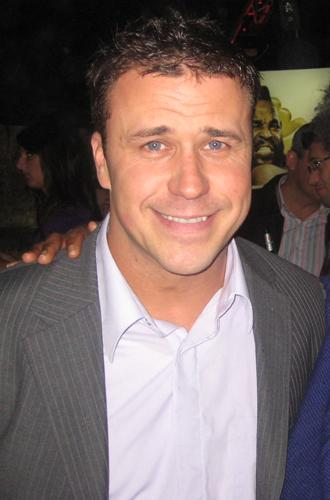
Craig Phillips, winner of the first series of Big Brother, defended this edition of the programme from its critics.

In comparison with other contemporary reality television programmes and previous editions of Big Brother, this series has received lower viewing figures and less press coverage. One Bookmaker reported the series had attracted the lowest amount of bets placed in a single day for any reality programme in the last decade. Four weeks before the programme began, former chat show presenter Michael Parkinson was critical of the programme; "I object to the exploitation of the underclass in shows like Big Brother. It is the modern version of Bedlam, where you pay to see the poor benighted people making asses of themselves". Charlie Brooker of The Guardian said that the series contained forgettable participants and that the producers were alienating the viewers with confusing tasks that seemed to take place "every four minutes". Simmy Richman of The Independent wrote that the programme had become predictable after ten editions and that it had a "here-we-go-again feel". They also complained that the format had become clichéd and the housemates stereotypical, and they criticised the producers for enrolling participants who were using the programme as "a springboard to a Heat magazine cover and temporary free entry to dodgy nightclubs". Maggie Brown, writing in her book A Licence to be Different — The Story of Channel 4, believed that the programme limited its broadcaster as the cost to produce the programme were not justified by the number of viewers it attracted. Mark Lawson, also writing in The Guardian, suggested that the lack of viewers linked with a tired format and minimal press coverage, claiming that the newspapers had become preoccupied with stories such as the outbreak of swine flu, death of Michael Jackson and MPs' expenses scandal. Lawson also believed that the death of Big Brother 2002 participant Jade Goody prior to the launch of Big Brother 2009 contributed to the low viewing figures. Journalist James Donaghy branded the programme a "sorry atrocity" and celebrity gossip blogger Darryn Lyons said that the series had been "massively disappointing", pinpointing Isaac Stout's entrance as a "desperate stunt" to attract viewers. Despite returning to the House to participate in a task, former housemate Dean O'Loughlin has also been critical of this series, describing it as "way too superficial".

However, the series has also received praise from various parties. For example, Gerard Gilbert of The Independent argued that in comparison to contemporary TV dramas, Big Brother provides much more entertainment, psychological depth and social impact. Gilbert also commented that the storylines of the programme were equal to that of the works of Samuel Beckett. Craig Phillips, the winner of the first series of Big Brother, and the programme's presenter Davina McCall have responded to the criticisms of the programme's decreasing viewing figures, respectively arguing that the programme achieves low numbers due to the different way in which viewers can watch the programme and that the programme is achieving well considering its timeslot and broadcaster. Brian Dowling, who won the second edition of Big Brother in 2001, defended both the programme and the reality genre as a whole, telling BBC Breakfast that producers were simply providing viewers what they want, such as extreme participants. The Guardian's Heidi Stephens also complimented the series by claiming that it has "seen the emergence of some truly fascinating personalities" and welcomed the return to the basic format of the programme. Stephens went on to compare the storylines and characters of the programme with that of a John Hughes film. Aisleyne Horgan-Wallace, who came third in the seventh series, and Big Brother 2003 winner Cameron Stout praised the selection of housemates, both claiming that the quality of the programme had improved on previous years. Entertainment website Digital Spy was also complimentary of the series, naming Sophie "Dogface" Reade and Kris Donnelly as two of the sexiest housemates of the past ten years and Angel McKenzie as one of the most outrageous. Towards the end of the programme's airing, Neil Boom of The Independent argued that the series is "one of the best ever" despite a decline in the number of viewers. He claimed that there was still high interest on internet forums and that the lower television ratings might be due to the removal of the 24-hour live feed. He praised the selection of housemates and highlighted Siavash, Freddie and Marcus as particular examples. Following the end of the series, Davina McCall also considered Big Brother 10 to be "Big Brother at its best."

=== Viewing figures ===
These viewing figures are taken from BARB.

	Week 1		Week 2	Week 3	Week 4	Week 5	Week 6	Week 7	Week 8	Week 9	Week 10	Week 11	Week 12	Week 13
Saturday		2.06	1.62	1.66	1.43	1.57	1.52	1.75	1.67	1.83	1.59	1.8	1.73	1.58
Sunday		2.03	2.18	2.14	1.84	2.01	1.7	2.28	2.19	2.06	2.13	2.1	2.01	1.82
Monday		2.16	2.13	2.12	1.63	2.11	2.3	2.28	2.23	2.24	2.36	2.24	2.18	2.18
Tuesday		2.27	2.26	2.02	2.08	1.92	2.42	2.47	2.38	2.25	2.2	2.34	2.08	2.69
Tuesday		2.27	2.26	2.02	2.08	1.92	2.42	2.47	2.38	2.25	2.2	2.34	2.08	2.32
Wednesday		2.44	2.19	1.95	2.06	2.18	2.16	2.22	2.09	2.02	1.97	2.17	2.33	2.07
Wednesday		2.44	2.19	2.01	2.06	2.18	2.16	2.22	2.09	2.02	1.97	2.17	2.33	2.07
Thursday	5.15	2.18	2.11	1.99	1.91	2.12	2.35	2.31	2.45	2.15	2.64	2.33	2.36	2.14
Friday	3	2.9	2.38	2.12	2.51	2.24	2.9	2.29	2.73	2.67	2.61	2.7	2.49	2.88
Friday	3	2.14	2.31	1.93	2.46	2.5	2.97	2.12	2.75	2.64	2.58	2.75	2.55	3.23
Weekly average	2.63		2.15	1.99	1.99	2.08	2.29	2.22	2.31	2.23	2.26	2.3	2.22	2.32
Running average	2.63		2.42	2.28	2.21	2.19	2.2	2.2	2.22	2.22	2.18	2.18	2.23	2.24
Series average	2.24													
