= 420 (Family Guy) =

- Family Guy episode
- Episode no.: Season 7 Episode 12
- Directed by: Julius Wu
- Written by: Patrick Meighan
- Production code: 6ACX16
- Original air date: April 19, 2009

Guest appearances
- Phil LaMarr as Ollie Williams; Kerrigan Mahan as various characters

Episode chronology
← Previous "Not All Dogs Go to Heaven"	Next → "Stew-Roids"
- Family Guy season 7

"420" (also known as "Episode 420") is the 12th episode in the seventh season of the American animated television series Family Guy. It premiered on Fox in the United States on April 19, 2009. The title of the episode is a reference to the term "420" used in cannabis culture; "420" premiered on bicycle day, April 19, the day before April 20 (4/20), on which a counterculture holiday is celebrated centering on the consumption of cannabis. "420" focuses on the character Brian after he is arrested for drug possession, which prompts him to launch a campaign to legalize cannabis with help from Stewie; the liveliness of their campaign convinces Mayor West to legalize the drug, and most of Quahog's population begins using it.

The episode was written by Patrick Meighan and directed by Julius Wu. it received mixed reception from critics for its story line and cultural references, it also generated controversy from the Venezuelan government for its topic and received criticism from the Parents Television Council during a rerun. According to Nielsen ratings, it was viewed in 7.40 million homes in its original airing. The episode featured guest performances by Phil LaMarr and Kerrigan Mahan, along with several recurring guest voice actors for the series.

== Plot ==
Peter, Brian, Cleveland and Joe are annoyed when Quagmire adopts a stray cat named James and prefers to spend more time with him than with them. When Quagmire goes to Vermont to buy him a birthday present, they decide to shave James as prank, but it backfires when Peter accidentally kills him. He and Brian decide to hide his body, but are pulled over by the police who, after ignoring Peter's blood stains and beer, arrest Brian when they find him in possession of cannabis. He is bailed out by the family and put on probation for drug use. He attempts to use Stewie's urine when Joe arrives to perform a drug test, only to be caught by Lois, who chastises him for going to such lengths and tells him that he has to change if he intends on doing so. However, Brian decides to start a campaign to legalize cannabis in Quahog. He and Stewie perform an enthusiastic musical number, and soon after the entire town rallies behind them in their cause.

Mayor West passes a law to legalize the drug, and everyone (except for Lois, her father Carter, and the kids) starts smoking it; the town has improved as a result, with milestones such as an increase in productivity and a decrease in crime. However, Carter begins to lose money in the timber industry since hemp is being used to manufacture many products, particularly paper, and he bribes Peter to help him with an anti-marijuana campaign. Lois, however, points out that their methods are uninspired, explaining that Brian only succeeded because he was passionate about legalizing cannabis. Carter decides to bribe Brian to join his cause by publishing and shipping his novel, Faster Than the Speed of Love. Brian resists at first, but Stewie suggests he at least perform a number about the health risks of cannabis, since the book does not have enough merit to sell on its own. Brian reluctantly complies, and the drug becomes illegal once more.

Unfortunately for Brian, when his novel is released, it is universally panned by literary critics and does not sell a single copy. Brian laments that he sacrificed his core beliefs for nothing, but Lois intervenes because he helped ban cannabis (and she also points out how Stewie got to build a nice fort from all of Brian's unsold books). A distraught Quagmire arrives at the household and informs Peter that he is still looking for James and offers a reward of $50; before Quagmire has a chance to react, Peter nonchalantly takes the money, admits that he killed him and slams the door shut.

== Production ==
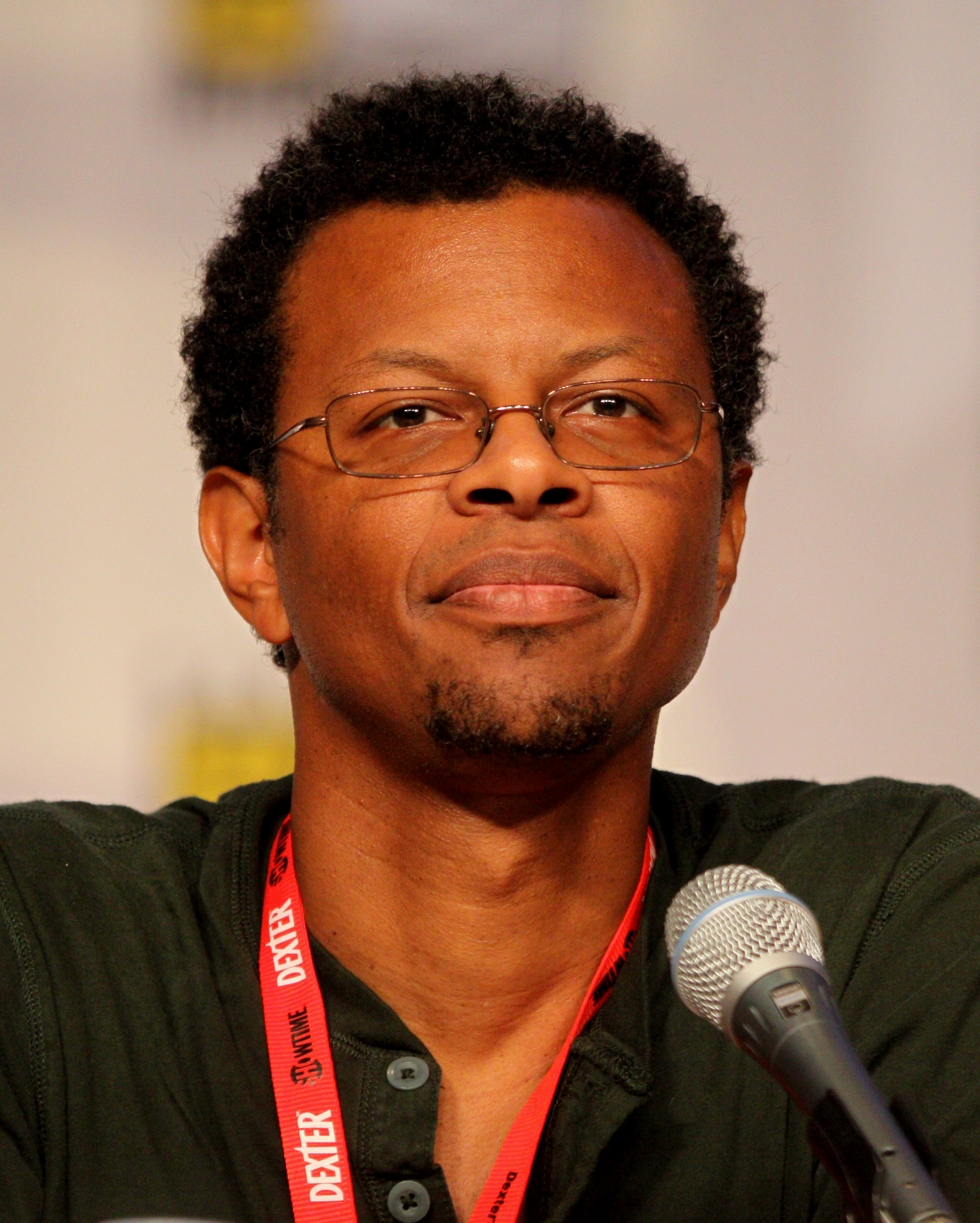
Phil LaMarr provided the voice of recurring character Ollie Williams.

The episode was written by series writer Patrick Meighan for his second writing credit of the season, the first being "Road to Germany", and directed by former King of the Hill and The Oblongs director Julius Wu before the conclusion of the series' seventh production season.

During the episode's production, the character of James the cat was originally colored white, but MacFarlane decided that it bear orange fur after he thought that white was a fairly dull color. The featured musical number "A Bag o' Weed" was based on "Me Ol' Bamboo" from Chitty Chitty Bang Bang.

In addition to the regular cast, voice actor Phil LaMarr and voice actor Kerrigan Mahan guest starred in the episode. Recurring guest voice actors Lori Alan, Chris Cox, actor Ralph Garman, writer Danny Smith, writer Alec Sulkin and writer John Viener also made minor appearances.

"420", along with the seven other episodes from Family Guy's eighth season and seven from the seventh season, was released on a three-disc DVD set in the United States on June 15, 2010. The DVDs included brief audio commentaries by Seth MacFarlane and various other crew and cast members from several episodes, a collection of deleted scenes, a special mini-feature that discussed the process behind animating "Road to the Multiverse", and a mini-feature entitled Family Guy Karaoke. The set also includes a reprint of the script for the episode.

== Cultural references ==
Peter, who tries to shave Quagmire's cat in the episode, ends up killing it and cutting it six times because of the legend of cats having nine lives. One cutaway sees Peter stating he gets excited when the title of a film is said within the film, with such examples including Clear and Present Danger, As Good as It Gets, and Superman IV: The Quest for Peace; this joke returns during Brian's arrest for marijuana possession; as one police officer is arresting Brian, he states that he doesn't tolerate drug users since he is a "family guy", to Peter's amusement.

In their campaign, Brian and Stewie perform their musical number, '"A Bag o' Weed", to the tune of "Me Ol' Bamboo" as featured in the film Chitty Chitty Bang Bang. During the song, a picture of actor Woody Harrelson (who has also famously advocated for the legalization of marijuana) is shown. Towards the end of the musical number, Shaggy from the television show Scooby-Doo can be seen among the crowd, referencing a number of jokes about his stoned-like demeanor. After cannabis is legalized, its effects include phenomenal ratings for Doctor Who.

Peter then tries to set up a cutaway joke but can't due to being high, and ends up listing the names of celebrities whom he does not like in a text crawl. While helping out with Carter's smear campaign, Peter comes up with an advertisement that involves Adolf Hitler claiming that the Holocaust was started by smoking cannabis. The campaign is then dropped after Carter informs Peter that Fox News holds Hitler's image rights and they cannot smear it. He later tries to film a new advertisement which informs that unlike the events of the film Harold & Kumar Go to White Castle, he made it there earlier since he was not stoned.

He then says Neil Patrick Harris was cast on How I Met Your Mother based on his work in that film, and brings up a point that confuses him: since Josh Radnor is already an adult, why is the narrator of the show voiced by Bob Saget? Carter later tells Brian that he will release his novel with an Oprah's Book Club induction. The crudely animated cutaway featuring a man smoking a joint and his dog trying to encourage him to give up the drug refers to similarly animated anti-marijuana advertisements sponsored by the Office of National Drug Control Policy and the Partnership for a Drug-Free America.

== Reception ==
"420" was viewed by 7.40 million viewers on its original airdate, receiving a rating of 4.3/6 in Nielsen ratings. The character Brian was awarded the 2009 Stoner of the Year award by the magazine High Times due to this episode, marking the first time an animated character received the honor.

The episode received generally mixed reviews from critics. Ahsan Haque of IGN rated the episode an 8.5/10, commenting that it "worked out quite well mainly due to the superb musical number". He called the storyline "pretty cohesive" with a "very few truly random jokes thrown in here", though he did criticize the killing of the cat as "over-the-top" and the large amount of blood which he called "disturbing". Genevieve Koski of The A.V. Club stated that the episode "showed admirable restraint [...] with its pot-centric plot", and called the musical number "truly spectacular". She graded the episode B, behind the Simpsons episode “The Good, the Sad, and the Drugly” which received a rating of B+; and the American Dad! episode “Delorean Story-an” which received a rating of A. The TV Critic's Robin Pierson gave the episode a 54/100; in his review, he appreciated the plot structure, especially the randomness of Peter's list of hated cultural icons. He did, however, criticize the featured musical number; he referred to it as a "waste of time" and claimed that "jokes about Texans, Michael Jackson, and Helen Keller are so obvious."

The Parents Television Council, a frequent critic of Family Guy and series creator Seth MacFarlane, branded a June 6, 2009 re-airing their "Worst TV Show of the Week", due to its emphasis on the legality of cannabis.

=== Controversy ===
The Venezuelan government reacted negatively to the episode and banned Family Guy from airing on their local networks, which generally syndicate American programming. Local station Venevisión was threatened with financial sanctions for broadcasting the show, which was avoided by airing an episode of Baywatch instead and they aired public service films as an apology. Justice Minister Tareck El Aissami stated that any cable stations which refuse to stop airing the series would be fined and he also claimed that it promoted the use of cannabis. The government then displayed the clip of which featured Brian and Stewie performing the featured number and then stated that Family Guy is an example of how the United States supports cannabis use.
