= Step in Time =

Song by the Sherman Brothers

Song by Dick Van Dyke

from the album Mary Poppins: Original Cast Soundtrack
- Released: 1964
- Label: Walt Disney
- Songwriter(s): The Sherman Brothers

"Step in Time" is a song and dance number from Walt Disney's 1964 film Mary Poppins which was composed by the Sherman Brothers. The choreography for this song was provided by Marc Breaux and Dee Dee Wood. It is sung by Bert, the chimney sweep (Dick Van Dyke) and the other chimney sweeps on the rooftops of London. It is similar to the old British music hall song "Knees Up Mother Brown".

== In the 1964 film Mary Poppins ==
In the 1964 film Mary Poppins, during the first part of the song, the lines Bert says in the verses are "kick your knees up", "'round the chimney", "flap like a birdie", "up on the railing", "over the rooftops" and "link your elbows" followed by an interlude. The interlude continues with Bert, Mary Poppins, Michael, Jane and all the chimneysweeps dancing around the rooftops and as Admiral Boom, the Banks family's next-door neighbour, looks at them with the telescope, he thinks that they're Hottentot robbers, so he orders his assistant, Mr. Binnacle, to make them scram with colorful fireworks.

In the second part, as all the chimneysweeps get in the house of George Banks, Mrs. Brill walks into the living room looking at them and screams, "They're at it again!" and she runs away trying to strike one of the chimneysweeps with a frying pan. As Jane, Michael, Mary Poppins and Bert get in the same place, Ellen runs around the dining room with an "OW!!!" and the chimney sweepers flip her. The other phrases in the rest of the musical number are "votes for women," "it's the master," and "what's all this?"

== Later versions ==
"Step in Time" appears in the 2004 Mary Poppins stage musical, with a similar purpose. The main difference, however, is that Bert walks upside down on the proscenium arch. In this version of the song, Jane and Michael are shown that chimney sweeps are also guardian angels.

A shortened version is also present on the Disney's Sing Along Songs video "Disneyland Fun".

A rendition also appears on the 1982 exercise album Mousercise, but with mostly different lyrics. This version was also seen as an episode of D-TV on the Disney Channel.

== Similar songs ==
The song "Me Ol' Bamboo" from the 1968 film Chitty Chitty Bang Bang, also written by the Sherman brothers and performed by Van Dyke, is very similar to Step in Time. Both songs are loosely based on the repetitive physical action song "Knees Up Mother Brown", popular in British music halls and Cockney pubs, especially during World War II.
