= Big Brother (British TV series) series 9 =

Coordinates: 51°39′23″N 0°16′02″W

Big Brother
- Series 9
- Series nine logo
- Presented by: Davina McCall
- No. of days: 93
- No. of housemates: 21
- Winner: Rachel Rice
- Runner-up: Michael Hughes
- Companion shows: Big Brother's Little Brother; Big Brother's Big Mouth; Big Brother Live; Diary Room Uncut
- No. of episodes: 108

Release
- Original network: Channel 4
- Original release: 5 June – 5 September 2008

Series chronology
- ← Previous; Series 8 Next → Series 10

Big Brother 2008, also known as Big Brother 9, is the ninth series of the British reality television series Big Brother. The show followed twenty-one contestants, known as housemates, who were isolated from the outside world for an extended period of time in a custom-built House. Each week, one or more of the housemates were eliminated from the competition, and left the House. The last remaining housemate, Rachel Rice, was declared the winner, winning a cash prize of £100,000.

The series launched on Channel 4 on 5 June 2008 and ended on 5 September 2008, lasting 93 days - the joint-second longest British edition of Big Brother to date (together with the seventh and tenth series, and one day shorter than the eighth series). Davina McCall returned as presenter for her ninth consecutive year. Sixteen housemates entered on launch night, with an additional five being introduced in later weeks. The series was watched by an average of 3.6 million viewers.

Big Brother 9 was the subject of viewer complaints and press attention regarding a variety of controversial scenes, including the ejection of two housemates for breaking rules regarding unacceptable behaviour, in separate incidents.

== Housemates ==
A total of 21 housemates entered the Big Brother house in this series. On Day 1, the original sixteen housemates entered the Big Brother House. Alexandra De-Gale was ejected on Day 14. Stuart Pilkington, entered the House on Day 16 as a replacement for Alexandra. For the first time since Big Brother 5, a second housemate, Dennis McHugh, was ejected on Day 23. Sara Folino, Maysoon Shaladi and Belinda Harris-Reid entered the house on Day 30, to replace Dennis. Maysoon walked on Day 56 and was replaced two days later by Nicole Cammack, Rex's girlfriend, who entered on Day 58.

| Name | Age on entry | Hometown | Day entered | Day exited | Result |
|---|---|---|---|---|---|
| Rachel Rice | 24 | Torfaen | 1 | 93 | Winner |
| Michael Hughes | 33 | Glasgow | 1 | 93 | Runner-up |
| Sara Folino | 27 | London (originally from Australia) | 30 | 93 | 3rd place |
| Rex Newmark | 24 | London | 1 | 93 | 4th place |
| Darnell Swallow | 26 | Ipswich | 1 | 93 | 5th place |
| Kathreya Kasisopa | 30 | Welling (originally from Thailand) | 1 | 90 | Evicted |
| Mohamed Mohamed | 24 | London (originally from Somalia) | 1 | 90 | Evicted |
| Lisa Appleton | 40 | Warrington, Cheshire | 1 | 86 | Evicted |
| Nicole Cammack | 19 | Surrey | 58 | 79 | Evicted |
| Stuart Pilkington | 25 | Manchester | 16 | 72 | Evicted |
| Dale Howard | 21 | Liverpool | 1 | 65 | Evicted |
| Luke Marsden | 20 | Wigan, Greater Manchester | 1 | 58 | Evicted |
| Maysoon Shaladi | 28 | Hertfordshire (originally from Syria) | 30 | 56 | Walked |
| Rebecca Shiner | 21 | Coventry | 1 | 51 | Evicted |
| Belinda Harris-Reid | 44 | Exeter, Devon | 30 | 44 | Evicted |
| Shaun "Mario Marconi" Astbury | 42 | Warrington, Cheshire | 1 | 37 | Evicted |
| Jennifer Clark | 22 | Chester-le-Street, County Durham | 1 | 30 | Evicted |
| Sylvia Barrie | 21 | London (originally from Sierra Leone) | 1 | 23 | Evicted |
| Dennis McHugh | 23 | Edinburgh | 1 | 23 | Ejected |
| Alexandra De-Gale | 23 | Croydon, Surrey | 1 | 14 | Ejected |
| Stephanie McMichael | 19 | Liverpool | 1 | 9 | Evicted |

== Head of House ==
The Head of House is responsible for doing the shopping list and deciding who does what in the shopping task. The Head of House is immune from being nominated for the week they hold the title, but they can still nominate others. The Head of House does not participate in any of the weekly shopping tasks, but supervises instead. Once a housemate has been Head of House they could not stand a second time, but could compete to stay in heaven. After the divide was removed, only eligible housemates competed to become Head of House, except for Week 12 when all housemates were eligible. On Day 88 all previous Heads of House joined Mohamed Mohamed in becoming Head of House for one day, putting an end to the role of Head of House.

- In week 6, on Day 38, housemates elected their Head of House. Dale, Luke Marsden and Darnell Swallow stood for election. Darnell won and was crowned first Head of House.
- In week 7, on Day 45, three housemates were chosen to compete for Head of House in a competition. They had to hang from a tyre for as long as possible, with the one staying for the longest time winning the title. Dale won and was crowned second head of House.
- In week 8, on Day 52, Big Brother called all housemates individually to the diary room, and gave each eight chili peppers to eat. Each chili pepper was assigned a certain number of points. The housemate that scored the most points by eating the peppers would win the title of Head of House. Stuart Pilkington won and was crowned the third Head of House.
- In week 9, on Day 59, Big Brother called all housemates individually to the Diary Room, to take part in the challenge of saying the alphabet backwards. The eligible housemate that did it in the fastest time would become Head of House, Rachel was second fastest after Darnell and became the fourth Head of House.
- In week 10, on Day 66, housemates from Hell and housemates from Heaven had to make cakes resembling famous London landmarks, with Hell recreating the Millennium dome and Heaven recreating Saint Paul's Cathedral. Head of House Rachel had to choose which cake was best and picked Hell's. As a result, housemates from Hell had to decide which one of them would become the next head of house, they chose Michael to become the fifth Head of House.
- In week 11, on Day 73, housemates eligible to become Head of House (Kathreya Kasisopa, Lisa Appleton, Mohamed, Nicole Cammack, Rex Newmark and Sara Folino) had to paint themselves with the paint and sponges provided to look like statues. They had to stay still as a statue until one of them was left and they would become the new Head of House. Rex won and became the sixth Head of House.
- In week 12, on Day 82, housemates voted for who they wanted to be the next HoH, instead of nominating for eviction. Mohamed received 4 votes and as HoH was immune from eviction that week. Unlike previous weeks all housemates were eligible for HoH.
- On Day 88 the role of Head of House finished.

Colour key
Won the title of Head of House
Eligible to become Head of House
Not in the house at the time
Was not eligible to become Head of House, having previously been Head of House.

| Housemate | Week 6 | | | Week 7 | Week 8 | | Week 9 | | Week 10 | Week 11 | Week 12 | |
| Housemate | Voted for | Votes | Side | Side | Points | Side | Time | Side | Side | Place | Voted for | Votes |
|---|---|---|---|---|---|---|---|---|---|---|---|---|
| Rachel | Darnell | – | Heaven | Hell | 0 | Hell | 1:05 | Heaven | Hell | – | Kathreya, Mohamed | 2 |
| Michael | Darnell | – | Hell | Hell | 30 | Heaven | 15:23 | Hell | Heaven | – | Lisa, Rachel | 1 |
| Sara | Darnell | – | Hell | Hell | 24 | Hell | 4:43 | Heaven | Hell | 6th | Lisa, Mohamed | 1 |
| Rex | Darnell | – | Heaven | Heaven | 26 | Heaven | 2:24 | Heaven | Hell | 1st | Darnell, Kathreya | 1 |
| Darnell | Dale | 9 | Heaven | Hell* | 10 | Hell | 0:51 | Heaven | Hell | – | Mohamed, Kathreya | 2 |
| Kathreya | Darnell | – | Heaven | Hell* | 20 | Hell | 8:05 | Hell | Heaven | 5th | Rachel, Mohamed | 3 |
| Mohamed | Darnell | – | Heaven | Hell* | 28 | Heaven | ? | Heaven | Hell | 2nd | Darnell, Rex | 4 |
| Lisa | Darnell | – | Hell | Hell | 9 | Hell | ? | Heaven | Hell | 4th | Sara, Michael | 2 |
| Nicole | | | | | | | 10:13 | Hell | Heaven | 3rd | | |
| Stuart | Dale | – | Hell | Heaven | 34 | Heaven** | 4:52 | Heaven | Hell | | | |
| Dale | Dale | 3 | Heaven | Heaven | 5 | Hell | ? | Heaven | | | | |
| Luke | Darnell | 2 | Hell | Heaven | 0 | Hell | | | | | | |
| Maysoon | Darnell | – | Heaven | Heaven | 9 | Hell | | | | | | |
| Rebecca | Luke | – | Hell | Heaven | | | | | | | | |
| Belinda | Luke | – | Hell | | | | | | | | | |

(*) Darnell, Kathreya and Mohamed all ate a banana from the gorilla task, therefore their punishment was living in Hell the upcoming week.
(**) Stuart was stripped of his Head of House title after discussing nominations. He was not replaced as Head until Rachel took over.

== Nominations table ==
| | Week 1 | Week 2 | Week 3 | Week 4 | Week 5 | Week 6 | Week 7 | Week 8 | Week 9 | Week 10 | Week 11 | Week 12 | Week 13 Final | | Nominations received |
|---|---|---|---|---|---|---|---|---|---|---|---|---|---|---|---|
| Rachel | No nominations | Alexandra, Sylvia | Sylvia, Luke | Jennifer, Rebecca | Luke, Rebecca | Lisa, Luke | Luke, Rebecca | Luke, Lisa | Lisa, Stuart | Lisa, Nicole | Lisa, Nicole | Lisa, Rex | Winner (Day 93) | | 22 |
| Michael | No nominations | Alexandra, Dennis | Sylvia, Rex | Darnell, Rex | Rebecca, Rex | Belinda, Rex | Darnell, Kathreya | Dale, Rex | Not eligible | Rex, Nicole | Nicole, Sara | Rex, Sara | Runner-up (Day 93) | | 6 |
| Sara | Not in house | | | | Exempt | Mohamed, Rachel | Mohamed, Rachel | Mohamed, Rachel | Mohamed, Dale | Mohamed, Rachel | Mohamed, Rachel | Rachel, Darnell | Third place (Day 93) | | 11 |
| Rex | No nominations | Alexandra, Mario | Mario, Sylvia | Rebecca, Jennifer | Mario, Lisa | Lisa, Belinda | Lisa, Michael | Dale, Luke | Dale, Stuart | Stuart, Rachel | Lisa, Sara | Sara, Lisa | Fourth place (Day 93) | | 30 |
| Darnell | No nominations | Mario, Lisa | Sylvia, Jennifer | Mario, Jennifer | Mario, Rebecca | Rex, Rebecca | Rebecca, Luke | Dale, Luke | Banned | Stuart, Nicole | Nicole, Sara | Sara, Lisa | Fifth place (Day 93) | | 16 |
| Kathreya | No nominations | Alexandra, Sylvia | Sylvia, Jennifer | Jennifer, Rebecca | Mario, Luke | Lisa, Rebecca | Luke, Rebecca | Luke, Lisa | Not eligible | Lisa, Stuart | Sara, Lisa | Lisa, Sara | Evicted (Day 90) | | 5 |
| Mohamed | No nominations | Alexandra, Dennis | Sylvia, Dennis | Rebecca, Jennifer | Rebecca, Mario | Rebecca, Stuart | Rebecca, Stuart | Dale, Luke | Stuart, Dale | Stuart, Rachel | Sara, Lisa | Sara, Michael | Evicted (Day 90) | | 26 |
| Lisa | Failed; Task | Jennifer, Sylvia | Rebecca, Sylvia | Rebecca, Jennifer | Darnell, Stuart | Rachel, Rex | Rex, Darnell | Rex, Dale | Rex, Stuart | Rachel, Rex | Rachel, Nicole | Rex, Rachel | Evicted (Day 86) | | 21 |
| Nicole | Not in house | | | | | | | | Exempt | Stuart, Rachel | Rachel, Mohamed | Evicted (Day 79) | | | 7 |
| Stuart | Not in house | | Exempt | Rex, Rachel | Rachel, Mario | Belinda, Mohamed | Mohamed, Darnell | Darnell, Maysoon | Michael, Sara | Rachel, Kathreya | Evicted (Day 72) | | | | 13 |
| Dale | No nominations | Mario, Alexandra | Rex, Mohamed | Rex, Mohamed | Rex, Mohamed | Belinda, Lisa | Mohamed, Darnell | Mohamed, Darnell | Mohamed, Darnell | Evicted (Day 65) | | | | | 9 |
| Luke | Failed; Task | Mohamed, Mario | Mohamed, Sylvia | Darnell, Rex | Kathreya, Darnell | Mohamed, Rex | Darnell, Mohamed | Kathreya, Rachel | Evicted (Day 58) | | | | | | 12 |
| Maysoon | Not in house | | | | Exempt | Belinda, Rebecca | Rebecca, Stuart | Dale, Rex | Walked (Day 56) | | | | | | 1 |
| Rebecca | No nominations | Alexandra, Darnell | Mohamed, Michael | Rex, Rachel | Mohamed, Rachel | Mohamed, Rex | Mohamed, Darnell | Evicted (Day 51) | | | | | | | 20 |
| Belinda | Not in house | | | | Exempt | Rex, Rachel | Evicted (Day 44) | | | | | | | | 5 |
| Mario | Failed; Task | Sylvia, Dennis | Sylvia, Rebecca | Rex, Mohamed | Rex, Darnell | Evicted (Day 37) | | | | | | | | | 14 |
| Jennifer | No nominations | Mario, Lisa | Michael, Mohamed | Rachel, Kathreya | Evicted (Day 30) | | | | | | | | | | 9 |
| Sylvia | No nominations | Alexandra, Mario | Rex, Michael | Evicted (Day 23) | | | | | | | | | | | 13 |
| Dennis | No nominations | Mario, Alexandra | Rex, Mohamed | Ejected (Day 23) | | | | | | | | | | | 5 |
| Alexandra | No nominations | Rex, Dennis | Ejected (Day 14) | | | | | | | | | | | | 9 |
| Stephanie | Failed; Task | Evicted (Day 9) | | | | | | | | | | | | | N/A |
| Notes | 1 | 2 | 3 | 4 | 5 | 6 | 7 | 8 | 9 | 10 | 11 | 12 | 13 | | |
| Against public vote | Lisa, Luke, Mario, Stephanie | Alexandra, Mario | Mohamed, Sylvia | Jennifer, Rex | Mario, Rebecca | Belinda, Rex | Darnell, Mohamed, Rebecca | Dale, Darnell, Kathreya, Luke, ~~Maysoon~~, Mohamed, Rachel, Rex, Stuart | Dale, Stuart | Rachel, Stuart | Lisa, Nicole, Sara | Lisa, Sara | Darnell, Kathreya, Michael, Mohamed, Rachel, Rex, Sara | | |
| Walked | none | | | | | | | Maysoon | none | | | | | | |
| Ejected | none | Alexandra | Dennis | none | | | | | | | | | | | |
| Evicted | Stephanie; 48% to evict | Eviction cancelled | Sylvia; 90.2% to evict | Jennifer; 89.7% to evict | Mario; 77% to evict | Belinda; 65% to evict | Rebecca; 65.4% to evict | Luke; 37% to evict | Dale; 63% to evict | Stuart; 59% to evict | Nicole; 94.9% to evict | Lisa; 52.6% to evict | Mohamed; 1.8% (out of 7) | Kathreya; 4.9% (out of 7) | |
| Evicted | Stephanie; 48% to evict | Eviction cancelled | Sylvia; 90.2% to evict | Jennifer; 89.7% to evict | Mario; 77% to evict | Belinda; 65% to evict | Rebecca; 65.4% to evict | Luke; 37% to evict | Dale; 63% to evict | Stuart; 59% to evict | Nicole; 94.9% to evict | Lisa; 52.6% to evict | Darnell; 14.9% (out of 5) | Rex; 22.5% (out of 4) | |
| Evicted | Stephanie; 48% to evict | Eviction cancelled | Sylvia; 90.2% to evict | Jennifer; 89.7% to evict | Mario; 77% to evict | Belinda; 65% to evict | Rebecca; 65.4% to evict | Luke; 37% to evict | Dale; 63% to evict | Stuart; 59% to evict | Nicole; 94.9% to evict | Lisa; 52.6% to evict | Sara; 30.1% (out of 3) | Michael; 48.7% (out of 2) | |
| Evicted | Stephanie; 48% to evict | Eviction cancelled | Sylvia; 90.2% to evict | Jennifer; 89.7% to evict | Mario; 77% to evict | Belinda; 65% to evict | Rebecca; 65.4% to evict | Luke; 37% to evict | Dale; 63% to evict | Stuart; 59% to evict | Nicole; 94.9% to evict | Lisa; 52.6% to evict | Rachel; 51.3% to win | | |

Notes

- ^Note 1: There were no nominations in Week 1. Instead, the result of the secret mission given to Mario, Lisa, Stephanie and Luke determined whether they or the remaining 12 housemates would face the public vote. As they failed the task, the four of them faced eviction.
- ^Note 2: Because Alexandra was ejected, the second eviction was cancelled. During the time the lines were available to vote, Alexandra had received 87% of the public vote.
- ^Note 3: As a new housemate, Stuart could not nominate and could not be nominated by his fellow housemates.
- ^Note 4: As punishment for discussing nominations, Big Brother sent Luke to jail, meaning he could not nominate. However, Rebecca used a "Get Out of Jail Free" card – one of Big Brother's Ever Changing Special Prizes bought in the weekly shopping Budget, to get out of jail. He was then allowed to nominate.
- ^Note 5: As new housemates, Belinda, Maysoon and Sara could not nominate and could not be nominated by their fellow housemates.
- ^Note 6: As Darnell was Head of House he could nominate but could not be nominated by his fellow housemates. Hell Housemates had to peel potatoes to nominate.
- ^Note 7: As Dale was Head of House he could nominate but could not be nominated by his fellow housemates. Hell Housemates had to chop onions to nominate.
- ^Note 8: Dale and Luke were nominated for eviction by their fellow housemates. However, Darnell, Kathreya, Maysoon, Mohamed, Rachel, Rex and Stuart discussed nominations in secret code, so as a punishment they also faced the public vote. At the time of nominations Stuart was Head of House and could nominate, but could not be nominated by his fellow housemates. Therefore, Lisa, Michael and Sara were the only housemates not to face eviction this week. After the phone lines were opened Maysoon decided to walk from the House, her line was therefore closed.
- ^Note 9: As a new housemate, Nicole could not nominate and could not be nominated by her fellow housemates. As Rachel was Head of House, she also could not be nominated by her fellow housemates, but could still nominate. Housemates from Hell Kathreya and Michael failed to eat a container of Brussels Sprouts and were unable to nominate. As punishment for crossing the divide to hell, Darnell was banned from nominating.
- ^Note 10: As Head of House, Michael could nominate but could not be nominated by his fellow housemates.
- ^Note 11: As Head of House, Rex could nominate, but could not be nominated by his fellow housemates.
- ^Note 12: The housemates voted for who they wanted to become the new Head of House. Mohamed was voted as new Head of House and guaranteed a place in the final week. Housemates then nominated face-to-face using whiteboards and pens. The two housemates with the most nominations, Lisa and Sara, took part in a task in which they could win some of the prize money. Lisa and Sara chose to share half of the prize fund and won £25,000 each.
- ^Note 13 There were no nominations in the final week. The public voted for who they want to win, rather than evict. On Day 90, there was a surprise double eviction during a party. Mohamed and Kathreya were evicted, leaving Darnell, Michael, Rachel, Rex and Sara on the final night.

== Weekly summary ==
| Week 1 | Entrances | On Day 1, Mario, Lisa, Luke, Stephanie, Rachel, Dale, Sylvia, Dennis, Michael, Alexandra, Rex, Mohamed, Rebecca, Darnell, Jennifer and Kathreya entered the house. |
| Week 1 | Tasks | On Day 1 the first four housemates to enter the house, Mario, Lisa, Luke and Stephanie, were given a secret mission by Big Brother before any other housemates entered. The group had to keep secret the fact that Lisa and Mario are a real couple, and instead convince the other housemates that Mario was in a relationship with Stephanie. As they failed the task, the four faced eviction.; On Day 6, housemates had to complete a task of endurance where they had to hold a panel above their heads. Dennis and Rachel were the two housemates to hold their panels above their heads for the longest time and were therefore awarded a picnic in the garden, which they refused to eat. As the winners, they were required to perform the week's shopping task: they must guide a wand around a wire sneaking throughout the house that shocks the other housemates whenever the wand hits the wire. After two hours, the housemates failed the task because they ran out of time having already incurred two fails because Alexandra and Sylvia took off their costumes. |
| Week 1 | Nominations | Since Mario, Lisa, Luke and Stephanie failed their secret mission, they faced the public vote, and no nominations took place. |
| Week 1 | Exits | On Day 9, Stephanie was evicted from the house, receiving 48% of the public vote to evict. |
| Week 2 | Tasks | On Day 10, Big Brother asked the most musical housemate to come to the Diary Room in order to receive the next task. The housemates were each given an instrument on which to learn a tune ("When the Saints Go Marching In"). As the most musical housemate, Darnell was assigned the role of conductor. The housemates will periodically play the instruments as an ensemble throughout their time in the house. The task will last the duration of the housemates' time in the Big Brother house. The housemates failed at their first attempt at this task, with Big Brother branding them "atrocious".; On Day 11, the housemates were asked to sort 6.25 kg of crisps by flavour merely by licking them. If the housemates came within a five percentage point margin of error for each flavour, Big Brother would give the housemates one token. The housemates failed the task and were not given any reward.; On Day 13, the housemates were assigned their second shopping task, Japanorama. As part of the task, they were required to learn Japanese, proper chopstick etiquette, karate, and perform karaoke. The housemates passed the task on Day 14. |
| Week 2 | Punishments | On Day 15, Rebecca opened an envelope containing a "Go to Jail" card and was sent to the jail cell in the garden. During her time in jail, Rebecca used make-up to write out a sign saying "Big Brother is a Beast". As punishment for breaking the house rule against writing, Big Brother extended Rebecca's stay in the jail by one hour. |
| Week 2 | Nominations | The housemates nominated for the first time. Alexandra and Mario received the most nominations and faced the public vote. |
| Week 2 | Exits | On Day 14, Alexandra was ejected from the house after unacceptable language. The eviction scheduled between Alexandra and Mario was eventually cancelled. |
| Week 3 | Entrances | On Day 16, Stuart entered the house. |
| Week 3 | Tasks | On Day 18, Big Brother conducted "Big Brother's Life Class", wherein housemates had to either paint or sculpt new housemate Stuart nude. If Big Brother appreciated the housemates' art, they would be granted one token. Stuart chose Jennifer's portrait of him as his favourite.; On Day 20, Big Brother assigned housemates with their shopping task, in which the housemates had to recreate the video of "Here It Goes Again" by OK Go, by hopping around the treadmills in unison. Housemates were allowed a maximum of three mistakes. The housemates passed the task on Day 21. |
| Week 3 | Incidents | Early in the morning on Day 23, a major argument began when Rex smudged a piece of pizza on Jennifer's winning drawing of Stuart from the life drawing task earlier in the week. The resulting argument, involving many of the housemates, caused not only the live feed of the house to be suspended, but the ejection of Dennis. |
| Week 3 | Punishments | On Day 19, Dennis, Jennifer, Kathreya, Rebecca, Rex, Stuart and Sylvia were punished for discussing the audition process by being forced to select two of the culprits to spend time in jail. They chose Dennis and Jennifer to be imprisoned.; On Day 19, Mohamed and Rex were sent to jail for twenty hours as punishment for talking about nominations. They were released on Day 20.; On Day 21, Darnell and Dennis were sent to jail as punishment for discussing nominations. |
| Week 3 | Nominations | The housemates nominated for the second time. Mohamed and Sylvia received the most nominations and faced the public vote. |
| Week 3 | Exits | On Day 23, Dennis was ejected from the house for unacceptable behaviour after he spat on Mohamed.; On Day 23, Sylvia was evicted from the house, receiving 90.2% of the public vote to evict. |
| Week 4 | Tasks | On Day 24, housemates had to trim topiaries into various randomly selected shapes. If the housemates were able to trim their plants to the required standard, Big Brother would grant them one token. The housemates failed the task and were not given any reward.; On Day 25, housemates were paired together by Michael, and one housemate in each pair would be blindfolded for three hours, while their partner leads them around. After three hours, the other housemate in the pair would be blindfolded for three hours. Michael would assist and advise the group in this task. Housemates would fail it the blindfolded partner took off their blindfold, unless instructed to by Big Brother. If the housemates passed the task, they would receive one token. Big Brother decided that housemates completed this task to a satisfactory level, so the housemates got one token.; On Day 27, the housemates took part in their weekly shopping task. All housemates had to dress up as animals and take part in separate tasks without incurring more than two fails. Lisa and Stuart were flamingos and had to stand on one leg for twenty minutes. Jennifer and Rebecca were seals who had fishy water thrown on them by zookeeper Mario every time Big Brother played a snippet from the song "Kiss from a Rose" by Seal. Elephants Luke and Michael had to memorize an excerpt from Rudyard Kipling's "The Elephant's Child". Darnell and Mohamed were rabbits and had to eat one carrot every fifteen minutes. Dale and Rex were kangaroos and had to take part in a boxing demonstration. Kathreya and Rachel were a two-headed llama and had to stay inside their costume together for the duration of the task. On Day 28, it was revealed that the housemates passed the task and therefore earned a luxury shopping budget. |
| Week 4 | Punishments | On Day 24, Mario and Michael were sent to jail for discussing nominations.; On Day 26, Luke was sent to jail for discussing and trying to influence nominations. He was also banned from nominating. However, because he used a "Get Out of Jail Free" card, he was allowed to nominate.; On Day 29, Rebecca was sent to jail for discussing nominations. |
| Week 4 | Nominations | Housemates nominated for the third time. Jennifer and Rex received the most nominations and faced the public vote. |
| Week 4 | Exits | On Day 30, Jennifer was evicted from the house, receiving 89.7% of the public vote to evict. |
| Week 5 | Entrances | Sara, Maysoon and Belinda entered the House on Day 30. |
| Week 5 | Tasks | On Day 31, the housemates took part in a task that required them to depict new housemates Belinda, Maysoon and Sara nude, in the medium of graffiti art. Housemates were paired up for this task. After the drawings were completed, the pairs presented their work, and Belinda, Maysoon and Sara had to decide whose "street art" was the best. Ultimately, they chose Michael and Rachel as the winning pair.; On Day 32, housemates were divided into teams of five by captains Belinda, Maysoon and Sara and instructed to fight their way out of large paper bags. If all housemates fought their way out of all paper bags within twenty minutes, the house would receive one token. Housemates were able to escape their bags within the time limit, but did not receive a token due to breaches of the rules by Belinda, Kathreya, Rebecca and Sara. The team of Dale, Luke, Mario, Maysoon and Mohamed received a special reward for being the only team to complete the task whilst following all rules.; On Day 34, Big Brother announced that for this week's shopping task, housemates must learn a traditional Irish dance as a group. Dale was chosen as choreographer, Belinda, Luke, Mario and Michael were drummers, and the rest of the housemates danced. Housemates failed this task on Day 35, due to three mistakes from the drummers, and countless mistakes from the dancers.; On Day 36, housemates had to express themselves entirely in song for one hour. They completed this task, and Big Brother rewarded them with alcohol and lemonade. |
| Week 5 | Punishments | On Day 32, Michael was sent to jail for discussing nominations. |
| Week 5 | Nominations | Housemates nominated for the fourth time. Mario and Rebecca received the most nominations and faced the public vote. |
| Week 5 | Exits | On Day 37, Mario was evicted from the house, receiving 77% of the public vote to evict. |
| Week 6 | Tasks | On Day 38, housemates elected Big Brother's first Head of House. In addition to making important decisions regarding food and tasks, the Head of House would be immune from the week's eviction. Dale, Darnell and Luke were selected as the candidates to run for the position. Darnell was elected Head of House, and subsequently had to choose six housemates to live in "Heaven" with him, gaining exclusive access to the Luxury Bedroom and Bathroom and the ability to exchange tokens. Darnell chose Dale, Kathreya, Maysoon, Mohamed, Rachel and Rex to join him in "Heaven", sending the remaining housemates to "Hell". The housemates completed the task and were given the right to nominate. As a reward for the housemates from Hell's hard work, Big Brother gave the "Heavenly housemates" fish and chips for the evening meal.; On Day 41, housemates had to participate in a French-themed shopping task for which Darnell assigned roles. Kathreya and Rex participated in a French food challenge by attempting to eat a five-foot-long baguette, Dale and Mohamed had to identify wine by taste and bouquet, and Maysoon and Rachel had to master the craft of mime. The "housemates from Hell" had to pedal a total of 1040 km on two stationary bikes (later reduced to 520 km due to one of the bikes not working). As Head of House, Darnell did not participate in the task, nor did Luke, who was suffering an illness. Housemates passed the mime and biking tasks, but failed the wine and food tasks and were given a basic shopping budget.; On Day 43, the "housemates from Hell" had to transport a large pile of manure across the yard using trowels and a wheelbarrow. They passed this task, and in addition to winning the promised tokens, they earned the "Heavenly housemates" an evening of barbecue and water pistols. After the task results were announced, Belinda was given an envelope which directed her to send a "Heavenly housemate" to "luxury jail". Belinda chose to send Darnell. |
| Week 6 | Punishments | On Day 43, Stuart was sent to jail for telling other housemates to nominate him. |
| Week 6 | Nominations | Housemates nominated for the fifth time. Belinda and Rex received the most nominations and faced the public vote. |
| Week 6 | Exits | On Day 44, Belinda was evicted from the house, receiving 65% of the public vote to evict. |
| Week 7 | Tasks | On Day 45, housemates had to choose three of their number to compete in a task to replace outgoing Head of House Darnell. The selected housemates would have to hang on a tire swing dressed as gorillas, with nothing to eat but bananas. Whoever could hang on the longest would win. The housemates chosen to compete were Dale, Maysoon and Rebecca, the latter of whom fell from her swing in under five minutes. Dale eventually won the task and was named Head of House for Week 7. He chose Luke, Maysoon, Rebecca, Rex and Stuart to join him in Heaven.; On Day 47, the housemates from Hell were forced to peel and chop onions in order to earn the right to nominate. They passed this task and were therefore allowed to nominate.; On Day 48, housemates engaged in a shopping task based around the theme of "time". Housemates from Hell had to, at regular intervals, find the ringing alarm clock in the Task Room, which had been filled with clocks, and turn it off. Housemates from Hell also had to continually refill a large egg timer with sand to ensure it never ran out. Luke, Rebecca and Rex had to unearth various objects in an archaeological dig and determine when they were created. Maysoon and Stuart had to construct a large pocket watch using components provided by Big Brother. In addition, all housemates except Dale had to form a "human clock" in the garden, with each housemate assigned a number on a large clock face and estimating in turn when five minutes had passed. As Head of House, Dale had to oversee the tasks but was not allowed to participate in any of them. Though housemates failed the archaeological dig and human clock tasks, they passed the remaining tasks and as such were given a luxury shopping budget for the week. |
| Week 7 | Punishments | During the "Hanging Around" task on Day 45, Kathreya and Mohamed crossed the fence into Hell to eat the bananas that were being used as decor for the task. As housemates had been explicitly warned not to do this, Kathreya and Mohamed were forced to spend the week in Hell as punishment. Big Brother also confiscated their suitcases and their possessions. Later during the task, Darnell also consumed a banana and disqualified himself from living in Heaven for the week.; On Day 48, Darnell was sent to jail as punishment for discussing nominations. |
| Week 7 | Nominations | Housemates nominated for the sixth time. Darnell, Mohamed and Rebecca received the most nominations and faced the public vote. |
| Week 7 | Exits | On Day 51, Rebecca was evicted from the house, receiving 65.4% of the public vote to evict. |
Week 8
| Week 8 | Tasks | On Day 52, housemates were called to the diary room in alphabetical order to participate in the next Head of House competition. Housemates had five minutes to eat a variety of chili peppers worth one to eight points, with eight points being the hottest and one point being the mildest. Whichever housemate finished with the most points would be the new Head of House.; On Day 54, housemates from Hell were informed that in order to nominate, they would have to separate approximately fourteen thousand hundreds-and-thousands into six different colours.Housemates completed the task to Big Brother's satisfaction and were allowed to nominate.; On Day 55, housemates undertook a "cops and robbers" themed challenge, with Heavenly housemates as cops and housemates from Hell as robbers. Heavenly housemates had to participate in a "stakeout", ensuring that two cops were in the police car set up in the garden at all times, and that all food and drink brought into the car was consumed. Lisa and Luke had to identify Mohamed's brother and Rex's girlfriend from a police line-up of seven people. Kathreya, Rachel and Sara were required to print $100,000 worth of counterfeit money. Dale, Darnell and Maysoon had to work out arithmetic equations in order to crack a safe. In a second, secret task, Dale and Maysoon also had to cross the fence into Heaven, steal a token, and hide it in Hell. It was revealed that this secret task alone would actually determine the shopping budget. Housemates failed this task as the cops figured out that Dale and Maysoon were responsible for taking the token. As a result of failure, housemates received their usual basic shopping budget. However, Michael and Rex chose to buy 57 of Big Brother's Ever Changing Special Prize Tokens from the shopping list, along with tea, coffee, milk, sugar and a packet of custard creams. Some of the special prizes included jam, ham, Spam, Babycham, a pram, a carcass of lamb and a record voucher for a song by Wham!. |
| Week 8 | Incidents | Lisa attempted to escape the house on Day 58. Lisa did not leave the Big Brother compound, and was allowed to return to the House, via the Diary Room, shortly after her departure, and went unpunished. |
| Week 8 | Punishments | On Day 55, Big Brother punished Darnell, Kathreya, Maysoon, Mohamed, Rachel, Rex and Stuart for discussing nominations in code by announcing that these housemates would face the public vote. They joined Dale and Luke, who were already up for eviction after receiving the most nominations. In addition, Stuart was stripped of his status as Head of House. |
| Week 8 | Nominations | Housemates nominated for the seventh time. Dale and Luke received the most nominations and faced the public vote. Due to discussing nominations, Darnell, Kathreya, Maysoon, Mohamed, Rachel, Rex and Stuart were also nominated. |
| Week 8 | Exits | On Day 56, Maysoon walked from the house.; On Day 58, Luke was evicted from the house, receiving 37% of the public vote to evict. |
| Week 9 | Entrances | On Day 58, Nicole entered the house. |
| Week 9 | Tasks | On Day 59, housemates were called to the Diary Room and asked to recite the alphabet backwards. The housemate who completed this task in the shortest amount of time would be the new Head of House, and the three housemates who took the longest would spend the week in Hell. Rachel won the title of Head of House, while Kathreya, Michael and Nicole were the slowest and were sent to Hell.; On Day 60, Kathreya led the housemates in an exercise class at the behest of Big Brother.; On Day 60, housemates from Hell had to sort 1,007 letters into piles marked "Heaven" and "Hell". Among these letters were letters for each of the Heavenly housemates. Head of House Rachel was called to the Diary Room and told to choose between receiving her own letter from home or giving the housemates from Hell their own letters from home. She chose to reward the housemates from Hell.; On Day 61, housemates from Hell had to consume three hundred Brussels sprouts collectively in order to earn the right to nominate. Housemates from Hell were unable to complete the task and were banned from nominating.; On Day 62, housemates started a puppetry-themed shopping task. While Heavenly housemates had to complete a table tennis-themed performance in the style of Bunraku, housemates from Hell had to perform multiple puppet shows using hand puppets of the various housemates illustrating their experiences in the Big Brother house. Housemates passed the task and earned a luxury shopping budget.; Day 65 fell on 8 August 2008, the luckiest date on the Chinese calendar. To celebrate the occasion, Big Brother pitted nominees Dale and Stuart against each other in a "bad luck" obstacle course that included opening umbrellas indoors, walking under ladders, spilling salt and cracking mirrors. By completing the obstacle course, Dale and Stuart won housemates a party to take place after that night's eviction. Though Stuart broke more superstitions during the task, Dale was evicted on Night 65, which led Big Brother to conclude that superstitions were "nothing more than mumbo-jumbo". |
| Week 9 | Punishments | Upon entering the house on Day 58, Nicole jumped the fence dividing Heaven and Hell. As punishment, on Day 59, Big Brother confiscated her suitcase and her personal belongings.; On Day 61, Big Brother punished Darnell for jumping the divide in the house the night before by revoking his right to nominate for the week.; On Day 62, Big Brother chastised Head of House Rachel for washing up around the House, and warned her to continue to do so "at her peril". When Rachel continued to clean up the House on Day 63, Big Brother punished the housemates from Hell by instructing them to clean up a trolley full of dirty dishes, each labelled with the word "peril".; On Day 64, Big Brother sent Stuart to jail as punishment for discussing nominations. |
| Week 9 | Nominations | Housemates nominated for the eighth time. Dale and Stuart received the most nominations and faced the public vote. |
| Week 9 | Exits | On Day 65, Dale was evicted from the house, receiving 63% of the public vote to evict. |
Week 10
| Week 10 | Tasks | On Day 66, housemates were instructed to bake cakes in the image of famous London landmarks, with Heavenly housemates creating a cake version of St Paul's Cathedral and housemates from Hell creating the Millennium Dome. Outgoing Head of House Rachel judged the winner based on taste and visual similarity to the actual landmark. Rachel chose the Millennium Dome cake, and Michael was chosen from among the winning team to be the new Head of House. Big Brother then announced that the winning team of Kathreya, Michael and Nicole would be sole occupants of Heaven that week, relegating the other housemates to Hell. The fence between Heaven and Hell, however, came down the following morning.; On Day 67, housemates had to fill a jar with hair in order to win a special prize. Michael chose Lisa as the house hairdresser, which meant only she was allowed to cut the hair off the other housemates. housemates passed the task and won a hamper full of alcohol and wigs.; The Weekly Shopping Task was the "Big Brother Games", in theme of the Olympics. All housemates, except Head of House Michael, took part in events including the feather-throwing event. The real task was that Michael had to guess at least 3 of 5 winners of the events correctly as he sat in the diary room for the housemates to win a luxury shopping budget. Michael correctly guessed 3 of the winners, so the housemates passed the shopping task. |
| Week 10 | Punishments | During the task on Day 67, Kathreya and Lisa broke the rules when Kathreya cut Lisa's hair, despite the rule stating that only Lisa was allowed to do so. As punishment, housemates were forced to empty the jar of hair and start over. |
| Week 10 | Nominations | Housemates nominated for the ninth time. Rachel and Stuart received the most nominations and faced the public vote. |
| Week 10 | Exits | On Day 72, Stuart was evicted from the house, receiving 59% of the public vote to evict. |
Week 11
| Week 11 | Tasks | On Day 73, Housemates were set their task for head of house. The housemates had to paint themselves and pose as statues the housemate that lasted the longest without moving was declared "Head of House". Rex lasted the longest and became Head of House.; On Day 74, to celebrate the appointment of Rex as Head of House, the rest of the housemates had to create mosaics of him using bubblegum. Rex had to split the housemates into teams of two. He chose Lisa and Michael, Kathreya and Rachel, Darnell and Mohamed, and Nicole and Sara. Rex would choose the winner to have a party with him in the diary room. He chose Nicole and Sara's mosaic as the best.; On Day 76, Big Brother gave the housemates news of the latest shopping task. Housemates had to perform a dance to "Thriller" by Michael Jackson. The Head of House, Rex would choreograph. They performed it on Day 77 and passed to Big Brother's satisfaction |
| Week 11 | Punishments | On Day 77, Kathreya was sent to jail for discussing nominations, but was released shortly before the 'Thriller' dance task.; On Day 79, Mohamed was sent to jail for discussing nominations. |
| Week 11 | Nominations | Housemates nominated for the tenth time. Lisa, Nicole and Sara received the most nominations and faced the public vote. |
| Week 11 | Exits | On Day 79, Nicole was evicted from the house, receiving 94% of the public vote to evict. |
Week 12
| Week 12 | Tasks | On Day 82, Big Brother changed the nominations. Instead of nominating the housemates that they wanted to face eviction this week, housemates nominated who they wanted to be Head of House. Mohamed received the most votes, therefore became the Head of House, and had a secure place in the final week.; On Day 83, Big Brother told housemates that this week's task was "Viva Las Vegas", in which housemates take part in Las Vegas themed tasks to win a luxury budget. Big Brother told them that they had passed but did not tell them that the next day they would have to gamble their winnings on slot machines in ten-pence-pieces. Despite successfully losing all the coins in the slot machines the housemates failed the task due to Mohamed cheating. Mohamed was later offered the chance to win alcohol and Vegas show tunes by attempting to eat an entire Vegas style buffet, consisting of burgers, fried chicken, fries, milkshakes, doughnuts and pancakes, he failed to eat it all. |
| Week 12 | Twists | On Day 84, the housemates were forced to nominate two housemates face-to-face in front of the housemates. Sara and Lisa received the most nominations and were thus due to face the public vote. They then took part in a special game (essentially the prisoner's dilemma) in the task room in which they had to show up either a "share" card or a "take" card. The jackpot was £50,000. If one chose "share" and the other "take," the one with "take" would get all £50,000. If both chose "share," the prize was split equally, while if they both chose "take," they would both leave empty handed. As both held up "share" cards, the £50,000 was split between them. |
| Week 12 | Nominations | Housemates nominated for the eleventh and final time. Lisa and Sara received the most nominations and faced the public vote. |
| Week 12 | Exits | On Day 86, Lisa was evicted from the house, receiving 52.6% of the public vote to evict. |
Week 13
| Week 13 | Exits | On Day 90, Mohamed and Kathreya were evicted from the house, receiving 1.8% and 4.9% of the public vote to win, respectively.; On Day 93, Darnell left the house in fifth place, Rex left the house in fourth place and Sara left the house in third place. It was then revealed that Rachel was the winner, leaving Michael as the runner-up. |

== Production ==
=== Broadcasts ===
The series was launched on 5 June 2008, and ran for 13 weeks until 5 September 2008. This series started later than normal. It was rumoured that this was so that it did not clash with Britain's Got Talent, which was being aired on ITV during May. Auditions were held from 21 November 2007 to 25 January 2008. The main show for the programme was a highlights show, shown at 10 pm on Monday to Wednesday, then at 9 pm on Thursday to Sunday, with each programme lasting an hour. Each Friday a housemate was evicted, the announcement of the loser of the public vote was announced live by Davina McCall at the end of the first of two programmes shown on the Friday. There was then a second programme at 10.30 pm when McCall interviews the evictee, this second programme usually lasted until 11.00 pm, unless there was a change in plans (such as new housemates going in or a double eviction) then the programme was longer. For the first time since Big Brother 4 all of McCall's interactions with the house (except for the final night) took place in a studio to stop the crowd chants from influencing the housemates and to enforce the fundamental rule of "no contact with the outside world." This new medium of communicating with the house would continue into the next celebrity and civilian series.

In the final week, the Monday programme was moved to 9 pm, there were two programmes broadcast on the Tuesday, both hosted by McCall, the first at 8 pm and the second at 10 pm, when two Housemates were evicted. On Wednesday and Thursday the highlights show was shown at 9 pm. Then for the finale there were two programmes starting at 8 pm and 10.30 pm with an hour and half-hour break in between. Live streaming on E4 of events in the house was again missing because of the decision to keep E4 Music during the series' run rather than taking a break until the series is over. For the first time in the show's history, there was no live web stream. The series was accompanied with the shows Big Brother's Big Mouth, Big Brother's Little Brother and Diary Room Uncut. Zezi Ifore and George Lamb replaced Dermot O'Leary as the hosts of Big Brother's Little Brother whilst Big Brother's Big Mouth was hosted by a different guest host each week, beginning with Jack Whitehall. Chris Moyles took over for the first full week inside the Big Brother House. The weekly podcast made by the housemates in BB8 was axed for BB9, with a 60-minute radio show Big Brother's Big Ears as its replacement. Like the podcast, it was available for download on the Channel 4 website and was hosted by Iain Lee and Gemma Cairney. It aired twice a week on a Tuesday and Friday (after the Live Eviction) at 11.30 pm.

=== Logo ===
The official eye motif was revealed on 12 May 2008, on the official Big Brother website. This year's eye had a shattered effect, leading to some speculation that Big Brother was going to be evil again, just like BB5. It was later announced that BB9's theme was to be 'zero tolerance', which confirmed some speculation of a somewhat harsher Big Brother. In 2011, it was ranked the public's favourite Big Brother eye ever. Each Big Brother show shared the same logo but with a different coloured shard to reflect the show; Big Brother's Big Mouth was green, Big Brother Live and Diary Room Uncut were red, Big Brother's Little Brother was orange and Big Brother's Big Ears was purple.

=== House ===
Host Davina McCall tours the 2008 house. On her left is the main door (leading to the exit and Diary Room), to her right is the sitting area and dining table and ahead of her is the bathroom. Behind the camera is the kitchen.

As with all Big Brother series' since Big Brother 3 in 2002, the House was located in Borehamwood, Hertfordshire, just north of London, and was completely rebuilt with a new look for the 2008 series. The first images of the House were released in late May and showed the kitchen, living area, bathroom, one of the two bedrooms, and parts of the garden. The initial set of pictures revealed a lavish, Romanesque bathroom and a red kitchen fitted with triangular furniture and wall slats facing inwards, The bedroom shown (which the housemates nicknamed "B-Block") contains only eight beds surrounded by lockers and the garden was enlarged with vibrant colours and an ashtray in which housemates may smoke. The dining table had only eight seats when first shown to the public; it was later shown during the launch that there was a second adjoining table. On 4 June 2008, only one day before the launch of the series, Channel 4 released images of the luxury bedroom and for the first time before the launch show in the programme's history, the Diary Room. The luxury bedroom was accessed via the garden and contains eight double beds with an oval wardrobe built into the back. The Diary Room was in between the two sets of stairs by which housemates entered and exited the House (they join at the top). This meant that the housemates had to exit the House through the main doorway to enter the Diary Room; however, the Diary Room button that the housemates used to notify Big Brother of their intent to go to the Diary Room was located next to the main door inside the House. Outside the bathroom were tokens, which housemates bought from the shopping list and gave to Big Brother if they wanted to use hot water or get rewards. The tokens were not returned afterwards. When the house was split into Heaven and Hell, the garden had to be modified, with a new outside bathroom in "hell" and the seating area in heaven was located as the smoking area. Other areas in the House included, for the first time, a jail for housemates who break the rules. Located in a wall of the garden, the jail had a door which locked automatically when housemates entered and was exposed to the elements but did have bars so that housemates could not escape. On launch night, Davina McCall revealed that the House also featured a solitary confinement space for housemates who continued to break rules, accessible via the Diary Room. However, it was never used for this purpose and was instead used as a 'task room' for various tasks. In addition, a Nominations Pod was placed outside the luxury bedroom. Once housemates entered the pod, they were free to discuss nominations; however, upon exiting the pod, the regular rules regarding nominations applied. Early in the morning of Day 32 (6 July 2008), the Big Brother house was evacuated because of a bomb scare. All housemates were removed for their own safety while Hertfordshire Police carried out a thorough search of the premises at around 1:15 am. The scare was eventually declared a hoax and the housemates returned and the show resumed. The live feed was cut during the evacuation and search and did not resume until 4:00 am. The House has been used after the series for the shooting of graphics for the home page of the Big Brother horror spin off Dead Set.

==== House split ====
On Day 37, after Mario Marconi's eviction, McCall announced that over the weekend housemates will elect a Head of House, who would be in control of the whole house. It was also revealed that the house would be split in two, with one side being 'heaven' and the other 'hell'. Heaven had all the best seats, the entire swimming pool, sole access to the luxury bedroom and bathroom. Heavenly housemates had the right to smoke wherever they wish, as long as they remained in the garden, as well as sole right to the prison. Hell, on the other hand, had few seats, no swimming pool, sole access to the kitchen, meaning they had to cook for the "Heavenly" housemates as well, "B-Block" (the basic bedroom) and outdoor cold showers. Hellish housemates must also earn their right to nominate.

On Day 65, after Dale Howard's eviction, McCall announced that the divide between Heaven and Hell would be removed. Despite this, a new Head of House was appointed the next day and the housemates re-allocated between Heaven and Hell. The next day, the fence came down.

== Controversy ==
=== Removal of Alexandra ===
Within the first week of the series, media watchdog Ofcom and Channel 4 had collectively received over 433 complaints about alleged bullying from housemate Alexandra, after an argument broke out between her and the other housemates regarding oven chips. Channel 4 defended its housemate selection, claiming that the production team were closely watching the housemates as they normally do to ensure the safety of the housemates. The broadcaster also noted that Alexandra had been warned that her behaviour could be deemed threatening. On Day 14 she was ejected from the house after apparently threatening to have housemates who nominated her for eviction dealt with by her "gangster friends".

=== Removal of Dennis ===
Early in the morning on Day 23, at around 12:30am, an argument broke out when Rex rubbed a piece of pizza on Jennifer's winning drawing of Stuart from the life drawing task earlier in the week, causing it to smudge. Upset by this, Jennifer retreated to the luxury bedroom and was comforted by Dennis.

Rex apologized to Jennifer shortly afterwards but despite seemingly accepting that he was sorry, Jennifer became increasingly agitated and upset by his actions. This attracted a large number of housemates to the luxury bedroom including Lisa, Dale, Stuart, Rebecca, Sylvia and Luke to continue to express sympathy for Jennifer. Dale and Stuart in particular became very angry at the situation and both confronted Rex separately about the incident, seemingly unaware that Rex had already spent several minutes apologising to her.

Rex then returned to the luxury bedroom with Mohamed to once again apologise to Jennifer, during which time he came under intense criticism from Dale, Lisa, Stuart and Rebecca. Mohamed would stick up for Rex during the argument at which point Dale, Stuart and Rebecca became angry at him for getting involved in the discussion. Mohamed was then confronted by both Rebecca and Dale and whilst arguing with Dale, Dennis became extremely angry and shouted "fuck off" to Mohamed several times before appearing to spit in his face. Dennis was immediately called to the Diary Room by Big Brother and at the same time Mario escorted an upset and shaken Mohamed to the bathroom to wash his face.

Whilst waiting to enter the Diary Room, Dennis, clearly under the influence of alcohol taunted Mohamed over claims that he was homophobic, something which Mohamed had strenuously denied. Dennis then entered the Diary Room and was told to remain there by Big Brother until he calmed down.

Darnell, who was aware of the incident with the painting but unaware of what had occurred between Dennis and Mohamed, became enraged upon discovering this information. He then returned to the luxury bedroom to confront the other housemates as they were all seemingly supportive of Dennis. Darnell had to be restrained and calmed down by Dale, Lisa and Sylvia before Dale escorted him back to the other bedroom. However Mohamed and Dale then had another heated exchange before they were finally separated. The live feed of the House was then cut at this point, but most of the argument, its build-up and repercussions were included in the highlights the following night.

After a conversation with Big Brother, Dennis was allowed to return to the house, and the housemates were split into two groups with Mohamed, Rex, Darnell and Mario being instructed to stay in the main bedroom and all the other housemates in the luxury bedroom, where they remained until the morning.

At 1.17pm, Dennis was then summoned back into the Diary Room where Big Brother informed him that by spitting in Mohamed’s face he had broken strict rules regarding unacceptable behaviour and was subsequently removed from the house with immediate effect.

Several of the other housemates, including Dale, Stuart, Darnell, Jennifer and Mohamed had one-on-one conversations with Big Brother about the incident throughout the day, after which they all made peace with one another and put the incident to bed.

=== Bullying of Sara ===
During Week 12, Darnell and Rex both received warnings of unacceptable behaviour from Big Brother after they appeared to be bullying Sara. This was after more than 1,500 people complained to Ofcom about their alleged sexist behaviour.

== Ratings ==
All ratings are taken from British Audience Research Board, a consortium that announces viewing figures that are considered "official".

| | Week 1 | | Week 2 | Week 3 | Week 4 | Week 5 | Week 6 | Week 7 | Week 8 | Week 9 | Week 10 | Week 11 | Week 12 | Week 13 |
|---|---|---|---|---|---|---|---|---|---|---|---|---|---|---|
| Saturday | – | 2.74 | 2.07 | 2.47 | 2.51 | 3.68 | 2.2 | 2.68 | 2.07 | 2.32 | 2.54 | 2.66 | 2.48 | 2.36 |
| Sunday | – | 3.51 | 2.67 | 2.68 | 2.69 | 3.05 | 3.26 | 3.2 | 2.69 | 2.96 | 3.05 | 2.89 | 2.77 | 2.82 |
| Monday | – | 3.61 | 2.98 | 3.06 | 3.2 | 3.14 | 2.9 | 3.1 | 3.32 | 3.37 | 3.47 | 3.22 | 3.15 | 3 |
| Tuesday | – | 3.81 | 3.57 | 3.55 | 3.58 | 3.4 | 3.44 | 3.37 | 3.53 | 3.47 | 3.66 | 3.3 | 3.45 | 3.44 |
| Tuesday | – | 3.81 | 3.57 | 3.55 | 3.58 | 3.4 | 3.44 | 3.37 | 3.53 | 3.47 | 3.66 | 3.3 | 3.45 | 4.04 |
| Wednesday | – | 3.01 | 3.26 | 3.26 | 3.47 | 3.35 | 3.66 | 3.27 | 3.07 | 3.27 | 2.83 | 2.98 | 3.63 | 3.36 |
| Wednesday | – | 3.01 | 3.26 | 3.26 | 3.47 | 3.35 | 3.66 | 3.27 | 3.07 | 3.27 | 2.83 | 2.98 | 3.89 | 3.36 |
| Thursday | 5.59 | 3.18 | 3.82 | 3 | 3.36 | 3.25 | 3.16 | 3.06 | 3.32 | 3.27 | 2.96 | 3.31 | 3.38 | 3.44 |
| Friday | 3.76 | 3.85 | 3.52 | 4.14 | 3.92 | 3.64 | 3.72 | 3.86 | 3.8 | 3.77 | 3.79 | 4.09 | 3.52 | 4.06 |
| Friday | 3.76 | 3.18 | 3.62 | 3.04 | 4.03 | 4.01 | 2.88 | 3.45 | 3.87 | 3.17 | 3.33 | 3.67 | 3.37 | 5.17 |
| Weekly average | 3.62 | | 3.19 | 3.15 | 3.35 | 3.32 | 3.15 | 3.25 | 3.21 | 3.2 | 3.2 | 3.27 | 3.29 | 3.52 |
| Running average | 3.62 | | 3.43 | 3.34 | 3.34 | 3.34 | 3.31 | 3.3 | 3.29 | 3.28 | 3.27 | 3.27 | 3.27 | 3.29 |
| Series average | 3.29 | | | | | | | | | | | | | |
