= Knees Up Mother Brown =

Pub song originating in East London

"Knees Up Mother Brown" is a pub song, believed to date back as early as the 1800s, but first published in 1938, and with origins in the East End of London.

With its origins in public houses of East London, it was associated with Cockney culture. At the end of the First World War, it is documented to have been sung widely in London on 11 November 1918 (Armistice Night). The 1938 version was attributed to Bert Lee, Harris Weston and I. Taylor. During the Second World War it was performed frequently by Elsie and Doris Waters. It was also later performed on television by Noel Harrison and Petula Clark.

The expression "knees-up" means a "noisy party usually with dancing" - often accompanied by drinking.

== Lyrics ==
The most familiar version of the song is:

Knees up Mother Brown
Knees up Mother Brown
Under the table you must go
Ee-aye, Ee-aye, Ee-aye-oh
If I catch you bending
I'll saw your legs right off
Knees up, knees up
don't get the breeze up
Knees up Mother Brown

Other less common variations include:

'Ee-aye Ee-aye,
don't get a bree-aye'

In place of the more common:

'Knees up, knees up
don't get the breeze up'

A final, partly self-deprecating refrain is usually added as a chorus, particularly during a merry session at a pub or party:

Oh my, what a rotten song
What a rotten song
What a rotten song
Oh my, what a rotten song
And what a rotten singer too-oo-oo!

There is also a version of the song for children, with accompanying dance. The lyrics are:

There came a girl from France
Who didn't know how to dance
The only thing that she could do was
Knees up Mother Brown

Oh, knees up Mother Brown
Knees up Mother Brown
Knees up, knees up, never let the breeze up
Knees up Mother Brown

Oh, hopping on one foot
Hopping on one foot
Hopping, hopping, never stopping
Hopping on one foot

Oh, knees up Mother Brown
Knees up Mother Brown
Knees up, knees up, never let the breeze up
Knees up Mother Brown

Oh, hopping on the other
Hopping on the other
Hopping, hopping, never stopping
Hopping on the other

And whirling round and round
Whirling round and round
Whirling, whirling, never twirling
Whirling round and round

== In popular culture ==
The song is associated with West Ham United Football Club, with fans singing the song at the Boleyn Ground from at least the 1950s. It is also the name of an internet forum related to the club.

In the 1964 Disney film Mary Poppins, the song "Step in Time" written by the Sherman Brothers, was based on "Knees Up Mother Brown". According to Richard Sherman, the "Knees Up Mother Brown" dance was taught to Walt Disney, Tony Walton, and others by Peter Ellenshaw (the Disney Studio's head of special effects) and the Sherman Brothers witnessed them doing the dance and got the idea for "Step in Time".

Monty Python's 1971 album Another Monty Python Record features a track where The Spanish Inquisition bursts into the room and begins to quickly sing the song before the track fades out.

In the 2024 film The Rule of Jenny Pen, the character Dave Crealy (John Lithgow) terrorises residents of a care home with a hand puppet called Jenny Pen, including dancing to "Knees Up Mother Brown".
