= Rachel Rice =

Welsh television personality (born 1984)

Rachel Jenkins
- Born: Rachel Rice; 7 March 1984 (age 42); Pontypool, Wales, United Kingdom
- Occupations: Television personality; model; actress; teacher
- Years active: 1993–present
- Television: Big Brother UK
- Spouse: Richard Jenkins (m. 2011)
- Children: 2
- Website: rachel-rice.co.uk

Rachel Jenkins (née Rice; born 7 March 1984) is a Welsh actress, model and reality television star from Pontypool, Wales. She is best known for winning the ninth series of the [then] Channel 4 reality television programme Big Brother UK. Rice became the first Welsh contestant to win the show across its entire run and only Welsh winner during its years on Channel 4.

== Acting career ==
Rice worked as an actress from a young age, her most notable role was alongside Hugh Grant in the 1993 gothic horror, Night Train to Venice, when she was eight years old. She was most active between the years of 1993-1996; also having roles in The Memoirs of Sherlock Holmes and The Prince and the Pauper. She also took part in multiple television advertisements including Sony Handicam's infamous Fairies at the Bottom of the Garden, in 1991.

== Modelling career ==
Rice was the runner up in the 2003 Miss Wales beauty contest, which was won by Imogen Thomas; who coincidentally appeared as a housemate in series seven of Big Brother UK. She competed for both South and North Wales in Miss Great Britain.

In 2004, she won the Wales on Sunday newspaper's Welsh Idol contest, she was also a finalist in the 2005 More magazine's Most Fanciable Girl in the UK contest.

== Big Brother UK ==
In 2008, Rice entered the ninth series of Big Brother UK. She survived two evictions, the first in Week 8, where she and 9 other housemates faced eviction as a punishment for breaking the rules, and the second on Week 10, where she survived over Stuart Pilkington, with 41% of the vote. Rice won the show on Day 93, becoming the shows first Welsh winner. She won with 51.3% of the final vote against Michael Hughes.

During her time in the house, she was the only female to hold the position of Head of House in Week 9 after being the fastest person to recite the alphabet backwards in 1 minute and 5 seconds. Although Darnell Shallow did it faster in 51 seconds, he was ineligible to win as he had won Head of House in Week 6. During her time as HoH, she refused her own message from home in favour of those in Hell (who didn't receive theirs), but ultimately ended up receiving a video from home later on. On Day 62, she was chastised by Big Brother for cleaning and warned if she continued it would be at her "own peril", but continued doing so on Day 63, meaning Hell housemates were forced to clean a stack of dirty dishes each labeled "peril" later that evening. She also claimed that there were 352 days in a year, leading to criticism from fellow housemate Rex Newmark.

After winning, she revealed on Big Brother's Little Brother, that she planned to spend her £100,000 prize money on paying student debts, buying a new car and donated £10,000 to charity. She confirmed this on a 2009 episode of T4, while discussing her first impressions of the Big Brother series 10 housemates.

== Personal life ==
Rice is married to Richard Jenkins, they married in 2011. They have 2 sons. She has a degree in Drama and English, she began teaching full-time in 2013 at Croesyceiliog Comprehensive School.

== Filmography ==
Film and television
Year	Title	Role	Notes
1990	Wales Playhouse	Young Sara	1 episode
1993	Night Train to Venice	Pia	
1994	The Memoirs of Sherlock Holmes	Marina Savage	1 episode
1994	The Lifeboat	Debbie	1 episode
1995	Mister Dog	Giulia	
1996	The Prince and the Pauper	Prissy	1 episode
2001	Happy Now	Contestant #2	
2005	Anthem	Party Hostess	Short film by S4C
2007	The History of Mr Polly	Christabel's Friend	
2008	Big Brother	Self; housemate	Winner, 108 episodes
2008	Big Brother's Little Brother	Self; ex-housemate	1 episode
2008	The Sunday Night Project	Self; guest	1 episode
2009	Michael McIntyre's Comedy Roadshow	Self; audience reaction	1 episode
2012	Missed Connections	Hottie #1	
2013	Big Brother's Bit on the Side	Self; ex-housemate	1 episode
