= Stella Parton discography =

- Studio albums: 21
- Live albums: 2
- Compilation albums: 9
- Singles: 31
- Music videos: 5
- Remix albums: 1

The discography of American singer and songwriter, Stella Parton, contains 21 studio albums, nine compilation albums, two live albums, one remix album, 31 singles and five music videos. Her first recordings were released in 1972 as a studio collection called Stella (and the Gospel Carrolls). Her debut single, "I Want to Hold You in My Dreams Tonight", reached the top-10 on the US Hot Country Songs chart, peaking at number nine in 1975. Her second studio album of the same name reached number 24 on the US Top Country Albums chart. She had three more singles reach the top 20 on the US country chart during the late 1970s: "The Danger of a Stranger", "Standard Lie Number One" and "Four Little Letters". "The Danger of a Stranger" also made the top-40 on the UK Singles Chart. They were issued on the studio albums Country Sweet (1977) and Stella Parton (1978), which both also made the Top Country Albums top-40.

In 1979, Parton's fifth studio album titled Love Ya was released. The disc featured three top-40 US country singles, including "Steady as the Rain", which reached number 13 on Canada's RPM Country Singles chart. In 1982, her sixth studio album was released called So Far...So Good, which featured the charting US country songs "I'll Miss You" and "Young Love". Her final charting single to date was 1988's "I Don't Miss You Like I Used To". Her seventh studio album was not released until 1990 and was a collection of re-recordings called Favorites, Vol. 1. The Raptor label issued 11 studio albums by Parton during the 1990s and 2000s including Appalachian Blues (2001) and Testimony (2008). In 2013, the label issued a remix album titled Resurrection and a live album in 2013 called Live at Dollywood. Her most recent release was the 2018 studio collection titled Survivor.

== Albums ==
=== Studio albums ===
List of studio albums, with selected chart positions and other relevant details
Title	Album details	Peak chart positions	
Title	Album details	US Cou.	CAN Cou.
Stella (and the Gospel Carrolls)	Released: 1972; Label: Inspiration; Formats: LP	—	—
I Want to Hold You in My Dreams Tonight	Released: September 1975; Label: Soul, Country and Blues; Formats: LP, 8-track	24	—
Country Sweet	Released: July 1977; Label: Elektra; Formats: LP, 8-track	27	—
Stella Parton	Released: March 1978; Label: Elektra; Formats: LP, 8-track, cassette	38	21
Love Ya	Released: April 1979; Label: Elektra; Formats: LP, 8-track, cassette	—	—
True to Me	Released: 1980; Label: Stella Parton; Formats: Cassette	—	—
So Far...So Good	Released: April 1982; Label: Accord/Townhouse; Formats: LP, cassette	—	—
Favorites, Vol. 1 (re-recordings)	Released: 1990; Label: Montana Country; Formats: CD	—	—
A Woman's Touch (Note: A Woman's Touch was re-released in 2002 under the title Blue Heart by Raptor Records but removed four tracks.)	Released: August 1995; Label: SPPI; Formats: CD	—	—
Appalachian Blues	Released: January 19, 2001; Label: Raptor; Formats: CD	—	—
Appalachian Gospel	Released: October 14, 2003; Label: Raptor; Formats: CD	—	—
Holiday Magic	Released: December 2, 2008; Label: Raptor; Formats: CD	—	—
Testimony	Released: December 2, 2008; Label: Raptor; Formats: CD	—	—
Always Tomorrow	Released: March 17, 2009; Label: CD Baby; Formats: CD	—	—
American Coal	Released: March 9, 2010; Label: Raptor; Formats: CD	—	—
Buried Treasures	Released: September 30, 2014; Label: Raptor; Formats: CD, digital	—	—
Last Train to Memphis	Released: January 7, 2015; Label: Raptor; Formats: CD, digital	—	—
Mountain Songbird: A Sister's Tribute	Released: January 19, 2016; Label: Raptor; Formats: CD, digital	—	—
Nashville Nights	Released: July 25, 2016; Label: Raptor; Formats: CD, digital	—	—
Old Time Singing	Released: September 26, 2017; Label: Raptor/Stella Parton; Formats: Digital	—	—
Survivor	Released: September 26, 2017; Label: Raptor/Stella Parton; Formats: CD, digital	—	—
"—" denotes a recording that did not chart or was not released in that territory.

=== Compilation albums ===
List of compilations albums, showing all relevant details
Title	Album details
The Best of Stella Parton	Released: 1979; Label: Elektra; Formats: LP, cassette
Picture in a Frame	Released: 1993; Label: Eagle; Formats: CD
Anthology	Released: October 13, 1998; Label: Renaissance; Formats: CD
Romantic Moments	Released: April 28, 2003; Label: Raptor; Formats: CD
Favorites, Vol. 2	Released: 2004; Label: Raptor; Formats: CD
Favorites, Vol. 3	Released: 2005; Label: Raptor; Formats: CD
Hits Collection	Released: April 23, 2009; Label: Raptor; Formats: CD
Tell It Sister, Tell It	Released: June 1, 2011; Label: Raptor; Formats: CD
Then and Now	Released: June 1, 2016; Label: Raptor; Formats: CD

=== Live albums ===
List of live albums, showing all relevant details
Title	Album details
Mountain Rose: Live in Norway	Released: September 29, 2009; Label: Raptor; Formats: CD
Live at Dollywood	Released: August 19, 2013; Label: Raptor; Formats: CD, digital

=== Remix albums ===
List of remix albums, showing all relevant details
Title	Album details
Resurrection	Released: October 1, 2013; Label: Raptor; Formats: CD, digital

== Singles ==
List of singles, with selected chart positions, showing other relevant details
Title	Year	Peak chart positions			Album
Title	Year	US Cou.	CAN Cou.	UK	Album
"I Want to Hold You in My Dreams Tonight"	1975	9	—	—	I Want to Hold You in My Dreams Tonight
"It's Not Funny Anymore"	1975	56	—	—	I Want to Hold You in My Dreams Tonight
"Long Legged Truck Drivers"	1975	—	—	—	I Want to Hold You in My Dreams Tonight
"The Mood I'm In"	1976	—	—	—	I Want to Hold You in My Dreams Tonight
"You've Crossed My Mind"	1976	—	—	—	—N/a
"Neon Women" (with Carmol Taylor)	1976	87	—	—	—N/a
"I'm Not That Good at Goodbye"	1977	60	—	—	Country Sweet
"The Danger of a Stranger"	1977	15	38	35	Country Sweet
"Standard Lie Number One"	1977	14	20	—	Country Sweet
"Four Little Letters"	1978	20	36	—	Stella Parton
"Undercover Lovers"	1978	28	22	—	Stella Parton
"Stormy Weather"	1978	21	36	—	Love Ya
"Steady as the Rain"	1979	26	13	—	Love Ya
"The Room at the Top of the Stairs"	1979	36	35	—	Love Ya
"I'll Miss You"	1982	65	—	—	So Far, So Good
"Young Love"	1982	75	—	—	So Far, So Good
"Goin' Back to Heaven" (with Kin Vassy)	1984	—	—	—	Rhinestone
"Cross My Heart"	1987	86	—	—	—N/a
"Legs"	1988	—	—	—	—N/a
"I Don't Miss You Like I Used To"	1988	74	—	—	Always Tomorrow
"Picture in a Frame"	1993	—	—	—	Picture in a Frame
"Up in the Holler"	2001	—	—	—	Appalachian Blues
"I Draw from the Well"	2001	—	—	—	Appalachian Blues
"Smooth Talker"	2002	—	—	—	Blue Heart
"Keep on the Firing Line"	2002	—	—	—	Appalachian Gospel
"Family Ties"	2009	—	—	—	Testimony
"More Power to Ya" (with Dolly Parton)	2016	—	—	—	Mountain Songbird: A Sister's Tribute
"Dirty Rotten Dog"	2018	—	—	—	Survivor
"Like a Rock"	2018	—	—	—	Survivor
"It Can Be an Illusion"	2018	—	—	—	Survivor
"Stand by Me"	2026	—	—	—	—N/a
"—" denotes a recording that did not chart or was not released in that territory.

== Music videos ==
Title	Year
"Cross My Heart"	1987
"Up in the Holler"	2002
"Dirty Rotten Dog"	2018
"Like a Rock"	2018
"It Can Be an Illusion"	2018
