= Stormy Weather (Stella Parton song) =

Single by Stella Parton

from the album Love Ya
- B-side: "Lie to Linda"
- Released: September 1979
- Genre: Country
- Length: 3:13
- Label: Elektra
- Songwriters: Leo Sayer; Tom Snow
- Producer: David Malloy

Stella Parton singles chronology
"Undercover Lovers" (1978)	"Stormy Weather" (1979)	"Steady as the Rain" (1979)

"Stormy Weather" is a song originally recorded by American singer-songwriter, Stella Parton. Released as a single in 1978, it reached the US and Canadian top-40 on their corresponding country charts. It was later included on the 1979 album, Love Ya.

== Background, composition and recording ==
Dolly Parton's sister, Stella, established a music career in her own right, with a string of country hits during the 1970s, including the top-40 entry, "Stormy Weather". Despite having the same title as the 1943 song, Parton's was actually a new tune written by Leo Sayer and Tom Snow. "My version is strictly country. It's about a couple who don't get along too well together. Isn't that a strictly country situation?," she explained to Record World. The track was produced by David Malloy.

== Release, critical reception and chart performance ==
"Stormy Weather" was released as a single by Elektra Records in September 1978 and was distributed as a seven-inch vinyl record. It featured a B-side titled "Lie to Linda". Billboard reviewed it favorably, praising its "rhythmic delivery" and "crisp production". Cashbox named it among its "Singles to Watch" in October 1978. "Stormy Weather" entered the US Billboard Hot Country Songs chart in the fall of 1978, rising to the number 21 position that year. It was Parton's sixth US top-40 entry in her career. It also rose into the number 36 position on the Canadian RPM Country Tracks chart the same year. It was later featured on Parton's 1979 studio album, Love Ya.

== Track listing ==
7" vinyl single

1. "Stormy Weather" – 3:13
2. "Lie to Linda" – 2:52

== Charts ==
Chart (1978)	Peak position
Canada (Country 75 Singles)	36
US Hot Country Songs (Billboard)	21
