= Country Sweet =

Studio album by Stella Parton
- Released: July 1977
- Genre: Country
- Label: Elektra
- Producers: David Malloy; Jim Malloy

Stella Parton chronology
I Want to Hold You in My Dreams Tonight (1975)	Country Sweet (1977)	Stella Parton (1978)

Singles from Country Sweet
- 1. "I'm Not That Good at Goodbye" Released: March 1977; 2. "The Danger of a Stranger" Released: May 1977; 3. "Standard Lie Number One" Released: November 1977

Country Sweet is a studio album by American singer and songwriter, Stella Parton. It was released in July 1977 by Elektra Records and featured ten tracks. This included three penned by Parton herself, along with songs composed by others including a cover of a Burl Ives tune. It received positive reviews from Billboard, Cashbox and AllMusic in the years that followed. The album also spawned three singles, including the US top-20 songs "The Danger of a Stranger" and "Standard Lie Number One".

== Background ==
Although the younger sister of Dolly Parton, Stella carved out her own music career in the 1970s and had a string of hit singles during the decade. Her breakthrough came with 1975's "I Want to Hold You in My Dreams Tonight", a top-10 US country song that was issued on her own recording label. Parton's agent, Joe Taylor, then arranged for her to meet with Jim Malloy who signed her to his recording label, Elektra, in 1976. The label then agreed to begin recording her next studio album later that year.

== Recording and content ==
Country Sweet was co-produced by David Malloy and Jim Malloy in Nashville, Tennessee. The album consisted of ten tracks in total. Three of the songs on the project were composed by Parton herself: "If You're a Dream", "I've Got to Have You for Mine" and "The More the Change". It also features a song written by Shel Silverstein called "The Danger of a Stranger". Also included is a cover of Burl Ives's "A Little Bitty Tear". Its production was described by Greg Adams of AllMusic as incorporating elements of country disco and by Billboard as having "loud, upfront steel [guitar] licks".

== Critical reception ==
Professional ratings
Review scores
Source	Rating
AllMusic	3/5 stars

Country Sweet received a positive reception by critics and music publications. Billboard named it among its "Top Album Picks" in July 1977, finding that it had a "strictly country mood" while also having a variety of song tempos. Cashbox compared her vocals to that of her sister but noted that Stella had distinct production and writing. "Another younger sister success story by virtue of a strong talent and will of her own," they wrote. AllMusic's Greg Adams rated the album three out of five stars and found its album cuts to be stronger offerings than the singles spawned from it.

== Release, chart performance and singles ==
Country Sweet was preceded by the release of the single "I'm Not That Good at Goodbye" in March 1977, which rose to number 60 on the US Hot Country Songs chart. The album itself was officially released in July 1977 and was offered as either a vinyl LP or an 8-track cartridge. It was among several albums that launched Elektra's Nashville division in the late 1970s, along with products by Eddie Rabbitt and Vern Gosdin. Country Sweet peaked at number 27 on the US Billboard Top Country Albums chart in 1977, becoming her second release to make the chart and one of three to do so in her career. Another single off the album was "The Danger of Stranger", which was issued by Elektra in June 1977 and rose to number 15 on the US country songs chart. It would also spawn "Standard Lie Number One" as a single in November 1977 and it reached number 14 on the US country chart. The latter singles also reached positions on Canada's RPM Country chart, with "Standard Lie Number One" being the highest-peaking, rising to number 20.

== Track listing ==
Side one
No.	Title	Writer(s)	Length
1.	"Easy to Love"	Eddie Rabbitt; Even Stevens	2:05
2.	"Charlie's Baby"	Dave Hall	2:10
3.	"A Little Bitty Tear"	Hank Cochran	2:17
4.	"If You're a Dream"	Stella Parton	2:55
5.	"I'm Not That Good at Goodbye"	Bob McDill; Don Williams	2:32

Side two
No.	Title	Writer(s)	Length
1.	"Standard Lie Number One"	Dennis Wilson	2:37
2.	"The Danger of a Stranger"	Stevens; Shel Silverstein	2:35
3.	"I've Got to Have You for Mine"	Parton	2:48
4.	"It's the Little Things"	David Malloy; Stevens	1:53
5.	"The More the Change"	Parton	3:37

== Personnel ==
All credits are adapted from the liner notes of Country Sweet.

- Anne Garner – Design
- Tony Lane – Art direction
- David Malloy – Producer, arrangement
- Jim Malloy – Producer
- Hope Powell – Cover photo

== Charts ==
Chart (1977)	Peak position
US Top Country Albums (Billboard)	27

== Release history ==
Release history and formats for Country Sweet
Region	Date	Format	Label	Ref.
Various	July 1977	Vinyl LP; 8-track cartridge	Elektra	
Various	Circa 2017	Compact disc (CD)	Man in the Moon	
Various	Circa 2020	Music download; streaming	Elektra	
