= The Danger of a Stranger =

Single by Stella Parton

from the album Country Sweet
- B-side: "The More the Change"
- Released: June 1977
- Genre: Country; country disco
- Length: 2:12
- Label: Elektra
- Songwriters: Even Stevens; Shel Silverstein
- Producer: Jim Malloy

Stella Parton singles chronology
| "I'm Not That Good at Goodbye" (1977) | "The Danger of a Stranger" (1977) | "Standard Lie Number One" (1977) |

"The Danger of a Stranger" is a song originally recorded by American singer-songwriter, Stella Parton. It was released as a single by Elektra Records in June 1977 and became a top-20 hit on the US country chart that year. It was also a top-40 hit in Canada and the UK.

== Background and content ==
Dolly Parton's sister, Stella, became a musical artist in her own right during the 1970s. After the success of her breakthrough single, "I Want to Hold You in My Dreams Tonight", she signed a recording contract with Elektra in 1976. Among her hits at the label was "The Danger of a Stranger". The song was penned by Even Stevens and Shel Silvertstein, while the recording was produced by Jim Malloy. It was one of seven country singles on the radio in 1977 that were penned by Even Stevens. The song was classified by AllMusic's Greg Adams as "country-disco".

== Release and chart performance ==
"The Danger of a Stranger" was released as a single by Elektra Records in June 1977 and was offered as a seven-inch vinyl disc. It also featured a B-side titled "The More the Change". "The Danger of a Stranger" made its debut on the US Billboard Hot Country Songs chart on August 27, 1977 and spent five weeks on the chart. It later peaked at the number 15 position there, becoming her second single to make the Billboard country top-40. It was also one of three consecutive top-20 Billboard country singles she would have between 1977 and 1978. It also made the top-40 on Canada's RPM Country Singles chart, rising to number 38. It also made the UK Singles Chart, selling 17,000 copies over the course of a five-day period. It eventually reached number 35 in the UK, becoming her only single to chart there. "The Danger of a Stranger" was included on Parton's 1977 Elektra album, Country Sweet.

== Track listing ==
7" vinyl single

1. "The Danger of a Stranger" – 2:12
2. "The More the Change" – 3:37

== Charts ==
| Chart (1977) | Peak position |
|---|---|
| Canada Country Tracks (RPM) | 38 |
| UK Singles (Official Charts) | 35 |
| US Hot Country Songs (Billboard) | 15 |
