= Undercover Lovers (song) =

Single by Stella Parton

from the album Stella Parton
- A-side: "There's a Rumor Going Round"
- Released: June 1978
- Genre: Country
- Length: 1:52
- Label: Elektra
- Songwriters: Even Stevens; Sherry Grooms
- Producers: David Malloy; Jim Malloy

Stella Parton singles chronology
"Four Little Letters" (1978)	"Undercover Lovers" (1978)	"Stormy Weather" (1978)

"Undercover Lovers" is a song originally recorded by American singer-songwriter, Stella Parton. It was released as a single in 1978 by Elektra Records and became her fifth top-40 entry on the US Hot Country Songs chart. It was given positive attention from Billboard and Cashbox.

== Background and recording ==
Stella Parton (Dolly Parton's sister) had a music career in her own right, including a string of top-20 country singles for the Elektra label during the 1970s. In addition, she had a series of top-40 singles during the same time period, including "Undercover Lovers". The song was co-written by Even Stevens and Sherry Grooms. It was co-produced by David Malloy and Jim Malloy.

== Release, critical reception and chart performance ==
"Undercover Lovers" was released as a single by Elektra Records in June 1978 as a seven-inch vinyl record and featured the B-side, "There's a Rumor Going Round". Billboard gave the track a positive response, writing, "Parton provides a slick presentation of this uptemponumberthat carries the 'undercover' theme all the way through." Cashbox placed it in their list of "Singles to Watch" in June 1978. "Undercover Lovers" debuted on the US Billboard Hot Country Songs chart on July 29, 1978 and spent four weeks there. It eventually peaked at the number 28 position, becoming Parton's fifth top-40 US country single. It also reached number 22 on the Canadian RPM Country Singles chart. It was included on Parton's second Elektra studio album, which was released in 1978 and titled Stella Parton.

== Track listing ==
7" vinyl single

1. "Undercover Lovers" – 1:52
2. "There's a Rumor Going Round" – 2:32

== Charts ==
Chart (1978)	Peak position
Canada Country Tracks (RPM)	22
US Hot Country Songs (Billboard)	28
