= Ode to Olivia =

Single by Stella Parton

from the album I Want to Hold You in My Dreams Tonight
- B-side: "I Want to Hold You in My Dreams Tonight"
- Released: April 1975
- Genre: Country
- Length: 3:24
- Label: Country Soul
- Songwriters: Stella Parton; Bob G. Dean
- Producer: Bob G. Dean

Stella Parton singles chronology
"Ode to Olivia" / "I Want to Hold You in My Dreams Tonight" (1975)	"It's Not Funny Anymore" (1975)

"Ode to Olivia" is a song recorded by American singer-songwriter Stella Parton. It appears on Parton's debut solo album, I Want to Hold You in My Dreams Tonight, released in 1975. Written by Parton and Bob G. Dean, "Ode to Olivia" is a response to the criticism Australian singer Olivia Newton-John was receiving at the time by some artists of the American country music community for allegedly not being a "true" country singer. The song contains references to a number of Newton-John songs. "Ode to Olivia" was released as Parton's debut single, by Country Soul Records. The song was, however, overshadowed by its single's B-side, "I Want to Hold You in My Dreams Tonight", which became Parton's first hit.

== Background and controversy ==
It's all music. Country music has a style and I love it for the simplicity. But I also believe you can't put a passport on music. It doesn't belong to one section of the country. Music is international. The notes, the sounds, belong to anyone who can sing them.

— Newton-John reflections over the controversy.

The early 1970s saw a big controversy in the country music scene over the success of country pop, a subgenre which was deemed "not real country" by country traditionalists. The height of this controversy happened in 1974, when Australian singer Olivia Newton-John won a Country Music Association Award for Female Vocalist of the Year and a Grammy Award Best Country Vocal Performance, Female for her 1973 hit single "Let Me Be There". Angered for a recognition of this level being given for a non-American singer who wasn't considered country by many purists, a number of members of Nashville music fraternity protested over her winning. This event caused the creation of the short-lived Association of Country Entertainers (ACE), dedicated to "preserving and recognising the basic and traditional country singers." Parton then composed and released "Ode to Olivia" because she was "embarrassed for all my country cousins and sisters here in town [Nashville]." The singer further expanded her point about the controversy:

I was trying to apologise to her [Newton-John] ... I thought it was embarrassing that they got so irate that they had gone to such trouble ... I never will forget I played that song ["Ode to Olivia"] in the studio for [my sister] Dolly and she said, 'Oh Lord, Stella, don't let Porter hear that'. I said, 'Screw Porter, I don't care what he thinks.' ... They [ACE] just got all ticked off because none of them won that year.

Dolly, who initially aligned herself with the traditionalists, later approached and supported Newton-John. As a way to thank her, Newton-John recorded a cover version of Dolly's composition "Jolene", which was included on her 1976 album Come On Over. To date, Newton-John remains the only non-American singer to win a CMA Award for Female Vocalist of the Year.

== Composition ==
"Ode to Olivia" is a country song written by Parton and Dean, and produced by the latter. Lyrically, it affirms the country music community "ain't got the right" to say Newton-John isn't a "country girl" just because she's not from Tennessee, and also praises the Australian singer for her uniqueness and for crossing over into country music. The song makes references to Nudie Cohn and six songs recorded by Newton-John: "You Ain't Got the Right", "Country Girl", "Let Me Be There", "Have You Never Been Mellow", "The River's Too Wide" and "I Honestly Love You". (Note: Newton-John originally released "You Ain't Got the Right" and "Let Me Be There" on her 1973 album Music Makes My Day / Let Me Be There; "Country Girl", "The River's Too Wide" and "I Honestly Love You" on Long Live Love (1974) and "Have You Never Been Mellow" on her 1975 album of the same name. In the United States, however, four of these six songs ("You Ain't Got the Right", "Country Girl", "I Honestly Love You", "The River's Too Wide" and "You Ain't Got the Right") were first known as a part of her album If You Love Me, Let Me Know, released in 1974 at the country controversy apex, which is presumably why most of the songs references came from it.)

== Release ==
Recorded on Country Soul Records and distributed by International Record Distributing Association, "Ode to Olivia" was released as a single in April 1975, with "I Want to Hold You in My Dreams Tonight" as its B-side. Nevertheless, after the latter found success on country radios, the sequence was switched for the Australian single release, with "Ode to Olivia" now as the B-side. In the United Kingdom the song wasn't released in any single, being replaced as the B-side by "Truck Driving Mother". Billboard speculated the song could "fan again flames of controversy of the past."

== Track listing ==
- US 7" single
1. "Ode to Olivia" – 3:24
2. "I Want to Hold You in My Dreams Tonight" – 4:04
- Australia 7" single
1. "I Want to Hold You in My Dreams Tonight" – 4:04
2. "Ode to Olivia" – 3:24

== Credits and personnel ==
- Stella Parton – writer, vocals
- Bob G. Dean – writer, producer, background vocals, drums
- Vic Jordan – banjo
- Bennie Kennerson – piano
- Jack Ross – bass
- Paul Yandell – guitar

Credits adapted from the I Want to Hold You in My Dreams Tonight album's liner notes.

== Bibliography ==
- Ewbank, Tim (2011), Olivia: The Biography of Olivia Newton-John, Little, Brown, ISBN 978-0-749-90984-0
- Miller, Stephen (2008), Smart Blonde: Dolly Parton, Omnibus Press, ISBN 978-1-846-09760-7
