= I Want to Hold You in My Dreams Tonight (album) =

Studio album by Stella Parton
- Released: September 1975
- Genres: Country; MOR
- Labels: Soul, Country and Blues
- Producer: Bob G. Dean

Stella Parton chronology
Stella (and the Gospel Carrolls) (1972)	I Want to Hold You in My Dreams Tonight (1975)	Country Sweet (1977)

Singles from I Want to Hold You in My Dreams Tonight
- 1. "I Want to Hold You in My Dreams Tonight" Released: May 1975; 2. "It's Not Funny Anymore" Released: August 1975; 3. "Long Legged Truck Drivers" Released: late 1975; 4. "The Mood I'm In" Released: January 1976

I Want to Hold You in My Dreams Tonight is a studio album by American singer-songwriter, Stella Parton. It was released in September 1975 by Soul, Country and Blues Inc. and was her second studio offering. Its title track became her first major hit and was among ten songs on the album. Many of the songs were co-written by Parton herself and featured a diverse range of material. Among the self-written material was "Ode to Olivia", a song written in tribute to Olivia Newton-John. It received positive critical attention from magazines like Billboard and spawned four singles.

== Background ==
Dolly Parton's younger sister, Stella, found success as a country artist in her own right in the 1970s and her first hit was 1975's "I Want to Hold You in My Dreams Tonight". The song was issued on a label she helped create called Country Soul Records. Its success led to the label merging into a larger company, which was titled Soul, Country and Blues Records. Under the new label, Parton would make a studio album which would hold the same title as her hit single.

== Recording and content ==
I Want to Hold You in My Dreams Tonight was produced by Bob G. Dean and consisted of ten tracks. Eight of its tracks were either written or co-written by Parton herself and eight tracks were co-written by Bob Dean. It featured both ballads and uptempo recordings. Several of the selections were categorized as truck driving country songs such as "Long Legged Truck Drivers" and "Truck Driving Mother". In her memoir, Parton said she wrote these songs because it was trendy to record them in the mid 1970s. Another tune, "Ode to Olivia", was written in response to the criticism Olivia Newton-John's country records faced from the Nashville establishment.

== Release and critical reception ==
I Want to Hold You in My Dreams Tonight was released in September 1975 by Soul, Country and Blues Records Inc. as both an vinyl LP and an 8-track cartridge. The disc was leased in Canada to Boots Records Inc. and in the UK to the Mint Julep label. The album received a positive response from music publications. Billboard named it one of its "Top Album Picks" in its September 20th issue, writing, "A good mixture of material, all self-written or co-written but one, Stella shows some of the same talents of her sister, Dolly." Cashbox praised the variety of material found throughout the album and highlighted the track "Truck Driving Mother". AllMusic did not provide a written review but gave it a four-star rating out of five.

== Chart performance and singles ==
I Want to Hold You in My Dreams Tonight rose to the number 24 position on the US Billboard Top Country Albums chart, becoming her first album to make the list and her highest-peaking disc there as well. A total of four singles were part of the album, its earliest being the title track which was first issued in May 1975. It rose to the number nine position on the US Hot Country Songs chart in 1975. It was followed in August 1975 by "It's Not Funny Anymore", which reached number 56 on the Hot Country Songs chart. The third single issued was "Long Legged Truck Drivers" in late 1975, followed by "The Mood I'm In" in January 1976. Both singles failed to make the Billboard country chart.

== Track listing ==
All songs were co-written by Bob G. Dean and Stella Parton, except where noted.

Side one
No.	Title	Writer(s)	Length
1.	"I Want to Hold You in My Dreams Tonight"		4:10
2.	"Don't Do It Again"	Dean; Paul Overstreet	2:10
3.	"Long Legged Truck Drivers"	Parton	2:18
4.	"When the Fire Went Out Last Night"		2:47
5.	"I've Got to Get Back on the Right Side with God"	Dean; Overstreet	2:47

Side two
No.	Title	Writer(s)	Length
1.	"It's Not Funny Anymore"		2:30
2.	"Ode to Olivia"		3:20
3.	"Truck Driving Mother"		1:52
4.	"You Kiss the Fire Out of Me"		2:05
5.	"The Mood I'm In"	Parton	2:48

== Personnel ==
All credits are adapted from the liner notes of I Want to Hold You in My Dreams Tonight.

Musical personnel

- Jim Baker – Steel guitar
- Brenton Banks – Violin
- George Binkley III – Violin
- Jannie Brannon – Background vocals
- Susie Callaway – Background vocals
- Marcy Cates – Violin
- Marjorie Cates – Violin
- Bob G. Dean – Drums, trumpet
- Dottie Deleonibus – Background vocals
- Ronnie Drake – Background vocals
- Joe Edwards – Violin
- Rita Figlio – Background vocals
- D. J. Fontana – Drums
- Randy Goodrum – Synthesizer
- Allen Henson – Background vocals
- Vic Jordan – Dobro
- Bennie Kennerson – Clarinet, piano
- Charlie McCoy – Harmonica
- Allen Moore – Background vocals
- Stella Parton – Lead vocals, background vocals
- Willie Rainsford – Piano
- Jack Ross – Bass
- Dale Sellers – Guitar
- Buddy Spicher – Violin
- Gary Vanosdale – Violin
- Paul Yandell – Guitar

== Charts ==
Chart (1975)	Peak position
US Top Country Albums (Billboard)	24

== Release history ==
Release history and formats for I Want to Hold You in My Dreams Tonight
Region	Date	Format	Label	Ref.
US	September 1975	LP; 8-track cartridge	Soul, Country and Blues Inc.	
Canada and UK	Circa 1976	LP	Boots Inc.; Mint Julep	
Various	Circa 2020	Music download; streaming	Raptor	
