= Appalachian Blues =

Studio album by Stella Parton
- Released: January 19, 2001
- Recorded: 2000
- Genres: Country, gospel
- Label: Raptor Records

Stella Parton chronology
| Anthology (1998) | Appalachian Blues (2001) | Appalachian Gospel (2003) |

Appalachian Blues is the fifth studio album by singer Stella Parton. It is a plaintive collection of songs which combine country with hints of blues, gospel and folk.

== Critical reception ==
Professional ratings
Review scores
| Source | Rating |
|---|---|
| Entertainment Weekly | B |

Alanna Nash, writing for Entertainment Weekly, praised the album, describing it as a "disarmingly sweet set of songs". She also noted the "uncluttered mountain arrangements" and the fact that Stella Parton wrote many of the songs herself.

== Tracks ==
1. "Up In The Hollar" – 3:49
2. "Child Of My Body" – 2:58
3. "Lover's Dream" – 2:57
4. "Wayfaring Stranger" – 3:45
5. "The Missing Part" – 3:43
6. "I'll Think About Shadows" – 3:08
7. "I'll Draw From The Well" – 4:12
8. "One Honest Love" – 2:58
9. "Songbird's Heart" – 2:53
10. "Satisfied Mind" – 4:17
