= Stevenson High School =

Stevenson High School may refer to:

- One of the following Adlai E. Stevenson High Schools in the United States:
  - Stevenson High School (Lincolnshire, Illinois)
  - Adlai E. Stevenson High School (Livonia, Michigan)
  - Adlai E. Stevenson High School (New York City)
  - Adlai E. Stevenson High School (Sterling Heights, Michigan)
- Stevenson High School (Stevenson, Washington)
- Stephenson High School, a public school in DeKalb County, Georgia, United States
- George Stephenson High School, a secondary school in Killingworth, North Tyneside, United Kingdom.
