= Cameron Stout =

British reality TV personality

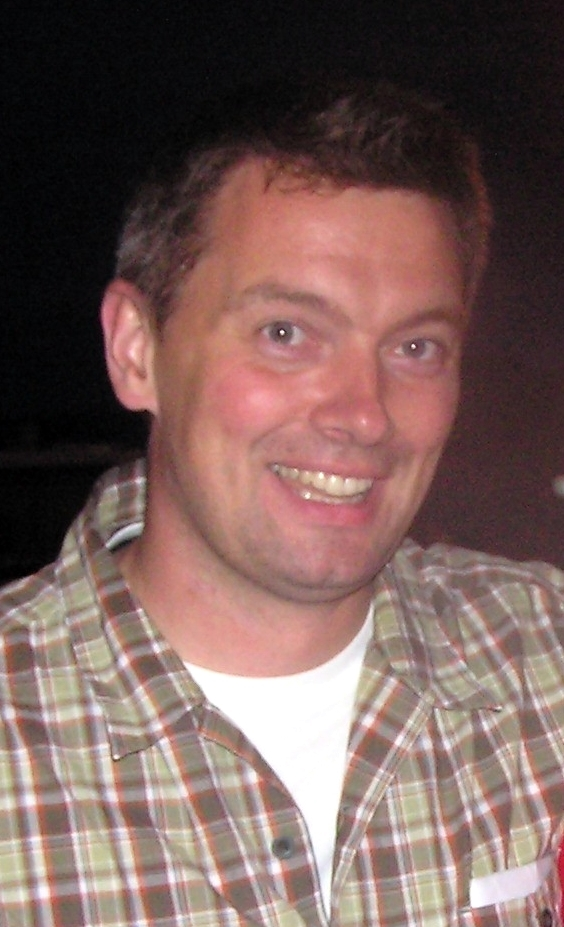
- Born: 8 March 1971 (age 55); Stromness, Orkney, Scotland
- Presenting career
- Stations: BBC Radio Orkney, BBC Radio Scotland
- Style: Radio presenter and journalist
- Country: Scotland

Cameron Stout (born 8 March 1971) is a Scottish journalist and presenter for BBC Radio Orkney and the winner of Big Brother 2003. He received 1.9 million votes, 500,000 more than runner-up Ray Shah. Cameron is the elder brother of television and radio presenter Julyan Sinclair.

== Big Brother ==
Before the contest, Stout had worked as a fish trader for an American company in Orkney in Scotland. Stout was known for his strong evangelical Christian beliefs and was proud in admitting his virginity. For this, and his belief that sex should only take place within marriage, he was mocked by the British tabloid press as a 'bible basher'.

During his time in the Big Brother house Cameron was involved in a swap with the Big Brother Africa house. He swapped places with Big Brother Africa housemate Gaetano Kagwa. Cameron gained immunity from eviction for a period of two weeks.

== Subsequent media work ==
Stout later became a spokesman for the Hall of Clestrain in the BBC television series Restoration, and has also co-presented the BBC Scotland series Teen Commandments in 2004 with Edith Bowman. He has also stood in for Robbie Shepherd and Gary Innes on BBC Radio Scotland.

Stout writes regular columns for The Sunday Post and the Aberdeen Evening Express, plus a guest column for The Sunday Post, when Big Brother is on air in the UK. He has appeared in pantomime in Aberdeen and Glasgow and is involved with various charitable events.

In 2004, Cameron was a judge at the Bridge of Don Academy Talent Show.

Stout is currently a journalist and presenter at BBC Radio Orkney in Orkney, Scotland.

In 2004, Stromness Museum opened an exhibition about Stout's times in the Big Brother house. Objects included in the display include his letter of acceptance and his suitcase.

In January 2008, Stout was preparing for an overland trip to China, called Paisley – Peking, with Alex Richards. They aimed to use the trip as a fund-raiser for the Glasgow-based charity, Sanctuary in the city.
