= Helen Adams =

Welsh reality television contestant (born 1978)

Helen Adams (born 30 May 1978) is a Welsh television personality who rose to fame in the United Kingdom when she was chosen to be a contestant on the second series of the reality television show Big Brother UK, in 2001.

== Big Brother ==
Adams was born in Cwmbran. Originally a hairdresser for Classy Cutz, Newport, and part-time dance instructor, Adams gained celebrity status in the UK due to her on-screen relationship with fellow Big Brother contestant Paul Clarke, a car designer from Reading. During their time in the Big Brother house, their relationship captivated the nation's interest, with millions of viewers tuning in to see the latest development in their soap opera–like romance. Adams was noted for her spontaneous tendency to blurt out whatever came into her head, which often tended to be bizarrely illogical and were referred to as "Helenisms" by fans and the tabloid press. Despite being the bookies' early favourite for eviction, she went on to take second place in the contest, losing to Brian Dowling in the final. Dowling polled 4,231,660 votes (58%) out of a total 7,255,094, while 2,680,463 viewers (37%) voted for Adams.

== Media career ==
After leaving the Big Brother house Adams was employed as a beauty advisor for Lorraine Kelly's topical chat show on Sky television, Lorraine. However, she was dropped from the line-up a few months later.

In 2001, she released a fitness DVD called Dance Workout with Helen, which was tailored to include humour and a sense of fun in the work-out, much in keeping with Helen's ditzy personality.

Since this time she has appeared as a guest panelist on the topical chat-show Loose Women (2003); several times as a Big Brother reporter for the breakfast show GMTV; as a celebrity chef on Ready, Steady, Cook, as well as featuring in several other Big Brother related documentaries.

In 2003, Adams appeared in the comedy gambling gameshow Banzai and in 2004 she was a contestant on Celebrity Fear Factor UK, along with Paul Clarke and Big Brother 3 contestant, Spencer Smith.

In 2008, she guest starred as herself along with several other Big Brother housemates in Charlie Brooker's Big Brother-inspired drama, Dead Set.

For the 2011 Red Nose Day Helen appeared alongside many other famous Welsh celebrities in a parody song called "Newport State of Mind".

== Personal life ==
Adams has revealed that she has dyslexia. She has since lent her support to a government literacy campaign.

Before entering the Big Brother house, Adams was romantically involved with a Welsh sales engineer, Gavin Cox; however, he publicly dumped her after watching her antics with her fellow housemate, Paul Clarke. Adams and Clarke began a relationship shortly after the Big Brother final in July 2001. The couple lived together in Barnet, north London, and their relationship was periodically featured in celebrity based magazines, particularly Heat, which interviewed the couple every few years to see how their relationship had developed.

During her time as a panelist on Loose Women, Adams indicated that she was approached about the possibility of filming a fly-on-the-wall documentary series about her life together with Clarke. The couple turned down the offer, opting to stay out of the limelight and concentrate on a normal life together.

However, in June 2006, Adams and Clarke confirmed they had split up after a five-year relationship. The couple told Heat magazine that they realised they got on better as friends and also blamed the pressure of fame for the break-up. Clarke claimed the last few months had been "hell" and Adams commented that they would stay close friends.

Following her split from Clarke, Adams moved to Portishead where she works as a stylist for Saks.
