= Standard Lie Number One =

Single by Stella Parton

from the album Country Sweet
- B-side: "The More the Change"
- Released: November 1977
- Genre: Country
- Length: 2:37
- Label: Elektra
- Songwriter: Dennis Wilson
- Producer: Jim Malloy

Stella Parton singles chronology
"The Danger of a Stranger" (1977)	"Standard Lie Number One" (1977)	"Four Little Letters" (1978)

"Standard Lie Number One" is a song written by Dennis Wilson that was first recorded by American singer-songwriter, Stella Parton. Released as a single by Elektra Records, it became a US-Canadian top-20 country hit in 1978. It was one of several top-20 singles Parton had in her career and was given positive reviews by music publications.

== Background, recording and content ==
Stella Parton (the sibling of Dolly Parton) had a music career in her own right, with a series of top-40 country songs in the 1970s. Among them were three top-20 recordings, including "Standard Lie Number One". The song was written by Dennis Wilson and was produced by Jim Malloy. According to Billboard, the premise of "Standard Lie Number One" is about how two people in a romantic relationship play "word games" with one another.

== Release, critical reception and chart performance ==
"Standard Lie Number One" was issued as a single by Elektra Records in November 1977 and was distributed as a seven-inch vinyl disc. It included the B-side, "The More the Change". Billboard compared her vocals to Dolly's but said that she "comes through with a strong singing job". Cashbox called her "a dependable country artist" and found the song's production was "tailored" to her singing. "Standard Lie Number One" debuted on the US Billboard Hot Country Songs chart on December 5, 1977. Spending ten weeks there, it climbed to the number 14 position by January 1977, becoming Parton's second top-20 single in a row and third to make the top-40. In Canada, it made a similar position on the RPM Country Singles chart, peaking at number 20 around the same period. It was included on Parton's 1977 album for the Elektra label titled Country Sweet.

== Track listing ==
7" vinyl single

1. "Standard Lie Number One" – 2:37
2. "The More the Change" – 3:37

== Charts ==
Chart (1977–1978)	Peak position
Canada Country Tracks (RPM)	20
US Hot Country Songs (Billboard)	14
