= Appalachian Gospel =

Studio album by Stella Parton
- Released: October 4, 2003
- Recorded: 2002
- Genres: Country, gospel
- Label: Raptor Records

Stella Parton chronology
Appalachian Blues (2001)	Appalachian Gospel (2003)	Romantic Moments (2008)

Appalachian Gospel is the sixth studio album by singer Stella Parton.

== Track listing ==
The track listing is as follows:

1. Amazing Grace
2. Leaning On The Everlasting Arms
3. Farther Along
4. Keep On The Firing Line
5. Precious Memories
6. In The Sweet Bye And Bye
7. Power In The Blood (Medley)
8. What A Friend We Have In Jesus
9. Pass Me Not O Gentle Saviour
10. This Little Light Of Mine (Medley)
11. He Set Me Free
12. Just A Little Talk With Jesus
13. Somebody Touched Me (Medley)
