= Big Brother (Australian TV series) season 3 =

Big Brother
- Season 3
- Presented by: Gretel Killeen
- No. of days: 86
- No. of housemates: 16
- Winner: Regina Sorensen
- Runner-up: Chrissie Swan
- Companion shows: Big Brother Nominations; Big Brother: Uncut; Big Brother: UpLate; The Insider
- No. of episodes: 122 (+ 55 UpLate + 2 specials)

Release
- Original network: Network Ten
- Original release: 27 April – 21 July 2003

Season chronology
- ← Previous; Season 2 Next → Season 4

The third season of the Australian reality television series, Big Brother, also known as Big Brother 2003, lasted 86 days, starting on 27 April 2003 and ending on 21 July 2003. The winner of season 3 was Regina Bird. Regina earned public admiration with her down-to-earth charm and work ethic. Chrissie Swan was the runner-up for the season and has excelled as an entertainment and media personality since. Bird was the first female winner of the show. Peter Abbott, the show’s executive producer, also served as the voice of Big Brother, with this season being the last in which he performed the role.

== Format ==
The season follows the same basic format as the prior season, however the twist for the season had housemates starting their Big Brother experience in two separate houses - a "Round House" and a "Square House". On Night 22, all Housemates were locked into their respective bedrooms and a construction crew spent the night merging the two houses and revealing the hidden swimming pool and kitchen that had been in between the two smaller houses. Housemates were released into their new combined house on the morning of Day 23. Later in the day, a bathroom linking the two bedrooms was revealed. This was also the first season in which cameras were completely hidden from the Housemates. Previously some cameras were visible to housemates and at times housemates were aware of the camera tracking their movements. The season was the last to permit housemates to read books in the house, reflecting the more lenient rules of the early seasons before stricter restrictions were introduced from 2004 onwards.

=== New programs ===
Two new shows were introduced:

- UpLate hosted by Mike Goldman. Mike Goldman was best known for doing the voiceovers in the daily show. UpLate was broadcast late at night showing live vision from the house with minimal editing.
- The Insider hosted by Tim Ferguson was a panel-type show with additional gossip and discussion about the show. Frequently the week's evicted housemate would be one of the show's guests.

=== Opening sequence ===
The Tower of Terror is displayed, and the logos of Dreamworld, Big Brother Australia, Network Ten and a map of Australia turns into a housemate-selection machine. We go through the orange bedroom, through the blue bathroom for a shower, through to the blue control room, to the edit section where footage from the diary room is being edited to be shown on the show before progressing to the garden (or the Big Brother Australia yellow stage for Nominations and Evictions). We then go to the purple kitchen, and three housemates are up for nomination the red housemate gets the most votes. The pink dining room is broadcast to a person on the internet at home. After 85 days, a winner is selected.

== Housemates ==
Fourteen Housemates entered during the first week of the series and were sent to one of two houses - the Square house (which was on the right of the compound) originally featured Belinda, Jaime, Irena, Carlo and Claire with Vincent and Saxon joining later in the week. After Ben entered the Round house on Day 1, Joanne, Regina, Chrissie, Daniel, Patrick and Leah were progressively admitted over the first week.

Name	Age on entry	Original House	Day entered	Day exited	Result
Regina Bird	29	Round House	3	86	Winner
Chrissie Swan	29	Round House	4	86	Runner-up
Daniel McInnes	28	Round House	4	85	Evicted
Patrick Flanagan	29	Round House	3	78	Evicted
Vincent Amato	29	Square House	2	71	Evicted
Jamie O'Brien	22	—N/a	37	64	Evicted
Daniel "Saxon" Small	19	Square House	5	57	Evicted
Kim-Marie "Kim" Drury	21	—N/a	37	57	Evicted
Joanne Ashton	23	Round House	2	50	Evicted
Claire Bellis	24	Square House	1	43	Evicted
Benjamin "Ben" Archbold	28	Round House	1	36	Evicted
Belinda Thorpe	20	Square House	1	31 (Note: Belinda briefly returned on Day 37, to properly farewell her Housemates and to introduce the Intruders.)	Walked
Leah White	18	Round House	5	29	Evicted
Carlo Melino	21	Square House	1	22	Evicted
Jaime Cerda	18	Square House	1	20	Evicted
Irena Bukhshtaber	29	Square House	1	15	Evicted

=== Future appearances ===
Regina Bird returned to compete again on Big Brother 2022, and won, making Regina the first player of Big Brother Australia to win twice.

In February 2015, Chrissie Swan appeared on the first season of I'm a Celebrity Get Me Out of Here!, finishing in third place. She also appeared on Celebrity MasterChef Australia, being first to be eliminated.

Regina Bird appeared on the 11th season of I'm a Celebrity Get Me Out of Here!, and finished as runner-up.

=== House guests ===
On Day 68, Anouska Golebiewski, the first evictee on Big Brother UK 4 entered the Big Brother Australia house. She left on Day 78, having stayed for 10 days, 2 days longer than her time as a Housemate in the Big Brother UK House.

== Episodes ==
No. overall	No. in season	Title	Day (Note: Denotes the real-time Day in the house at the time each episode aired.)	Original release date	Network
Week 1
221	1	In They Go (Note: In 2003, the Launch episode was broadcast live for the first (and so far only) time in Australia, as opposed to being pre-recorded 24-hours in advance.)	Day 1	27 April 2003	Ten
222	2	Daily Show 1	Day 2	28 April 2003	Ten
223	3	Live Surprise - Day 2	Day 2	28 April 2003	Ten
224	4	Daily Show 2	Day 3	29 April 2003	Ten
225	5	The New Housemates Live - Day 3	Day 3	29 April 2003	Ten
226	6	Daily Show 3	Day 4	30 April 2003	Ten
227	7	Round House Surprise Live - Day 4	Day 4	30 April 2003	Ten
228	8	Daily Show 4	Day 5	1 May 2003	Ten
229	9	The Final Housemates Live - Day 5	Day 5	1 May 2003	Ten
230	10	Daily Show 5	Day 6	2 May 2003	Ten
231	11	The Insider 1	Day 6	2 May 2003	Ten
232	12	The Party’s Over	Day 8	4 May 2003	Ten
Week 2
233	13	Daily Show 6	Day 9	5 May 2003	Ten
234	14	Live Nominations 1	Day 9	5 May 2003	Ten
235	15	UpLate 1	Day 9	5 May 2003	Ten
236	16	Daily Show 7	Day 10	6 May 2003	Ten
237	17	UpLate 2	Day 10	6 May 2003	Ten
238	18	Daily Show 8	Day 11	7 May 2003	Ten
239	19	UpLate 3	Day 11	7 May 2003	Ten
240	20	Daily Show 9	Day 12	8 May 2003	Ten
241	21	Uncut 1	N/A	8 May 2003	Ten
242	22	UpLate 4	Day 12	8 May 2003	Ten
243	23	Daily Show 10	Day 13	9 May 2003	Ten
244	24	The Insider 2	Day 13	9 May 2003	Ten
245	25	UpLate 5	Day 13	9 May 2003	Ten
246	26	Daily Show 11	Day 15	11 May 2003	Ten
247	27	Live Eviction 1	Day 15	11 May 2003	Ten
Week 3
248	28	Daily Show 12	Day 16	12 May 2003	Ten
249	29	Live Nominations 2	Day 16	12 May 2003	Ten
250	30	UpLate 6	Day 16	12 May 2003	Ten
251	31	Daily Show 13	Day 17	13 May 2003	Ten
252	32	UpLate 7	Day 17	13 May 2003	Ten
253	33	Daily Show 14	Day 18	14 May 2003	Ten
254	34	UpLate 8	Day 18	14 May 2003	Ten
255	35	Daily Show 15	Day 19	15 May 2003	Ten
256	36	Uncut 2	N/A	15 May 2003	Ten
257	37	UpLate 9	Day 19	15 May 2003	Ten
258	38	Daily Show 16 / Intruder Eviction	Day 20	16 May 2003	Ten
259	39	The Insider 3	Day 20	16 May 2003	Ten
260	40	UpLate 10	Day 20	16 May 2003	Ten
261	41	Daily Show 17	Day 22	18 May 2003	Ten
262	42	Live Eviction 2	Day 22	18 May 2003	Ten
Week 4
263	43	Daily Show 18	Day 23	19 May 2003	Ten
264	44	Live Nominations 3	Day 23	19 May 2003	Ten
265	45	UpLate 11	Day 23	19 May 2003	Ten
266	46	Daily Show 19	Day 24	20 May 2003	Ten
267	47	UpLate 12	Day 24	20 May 2003	Ten
268	48	Daily Show 20	Day 25	21 May 2003	Ten
269	49	UpLate 13	Day 25	21 May 2003	Ten
270	50	Daily Show 21	Day 26	22 May 2003	Ten
271	51	Uncut 3	N/A	22 May 2003	Ten
272	52	UpLate 14	Day 26	22 May 2003	Ten
273	53	Daily Show 22	Day 27	23 May 2003	Ten
274	54	The Insider 4	Day 27	23 May 2003	Ten
275	55	UpLate 15	Day 27	23 May 2003	Ten
276	56	Daily Show 23	Day 29	25 May 2003	Ten
277	57	Live Eviction 3	Day 29	25 May 2003	Ten
Week 5
278	58	Daily Show 24	Day 30	26 May 2003	Ten
279	59	Live Nominations 4	Day 30	26 May 2003	Ten
280	60	UpLate 16	Day 30	26 May 2003	Ten
281	61	Daily Show 25	Day 31	27 May 2003	Ten
282	62	UpLate 17	Day 31	27 May 2003	Ten
283	63	Daily Show 26	Day 32	28 May 2003	Ten
284	64	UpLate 18	Day 32	28 May 2003	Ten
285	65	Daily Show 27	Day 33	29 May 2003	Ten
286	66	Uncut 4	N/A	29 May 2003	Ten
287	67	UpLate 19	Day 33	29 May 2003	Ten
288	68	Daily Show 28	Day 34	30 May 2003	Ten
289	69	The Insider 5	Day 34	30 May 2003	Ten
290	70	UpLate 20	Day 34	30 May 2003	Ten
291	71	Daily Show 29	Day 36	1 June 2003	Ten
292	72	Live Eviction 4	Day 36	1 June 2003	Ten
Week 6
293	73	Daily Show 30	Day 37	2 June 2003	Ten
294	74	Live Nominations 5	Day 37	2 June 2003	Ten
295	75	UpLate 21	Day 37	2 June 2003	Ten
296	76	Daily Show 31 (The New Housemates)	Day 38	3 June 2003	Ten
297	77	UpLate 22	Day 38	3 June 2003	Ten
298	78	Daily Show 32	Day 39	4 June 2003	Ten
299	79	UpLate 23	Day 39	4 June 2003	Ten
300	80	Daily Show 33	Day 40	5 June 2003	Ten
301	81	Uncut 5	N/A	5 June 2003	Ten
302	82	UpLate 24	Day 40	5 June 2003	Ten
303	83	Daily Show 34	Day 41	6 June 2003	Ten
304	84	The Insider 6	Day 41	6 June 2003	Ten
305	85	UpLate 25	Day 41	6 June 2003	Ten
306	86	Daily Show 35	Day 43	8 June 2003	Ten
307	87	Live Eviction 5	Day 43	8 June 2003	Ten
Week 7
308	88	Daily Show 36	Day 44	9 June 2003	Ten
309	89	Live Nominations 6	Day 44	9 June 2003	Ten
310	90	UpLate 26	Day 44	9 June 2003	Ten
311	91	Daily Show 37	Day 45	10 June 2003	Ten
312	92	UpLate 27	Day 45	10 June 2003	Ten
313	93	Daily Show 38	Day 46	11 June 2003	Ten
314	94	UpLate 28	Day 46	11 June 2003	Ten
315	95	Daily Show 39	Day 47	12 June 2003	Ten
316	96	Uncut 6	N/A	12 June 2003	Ten
317	97	UpLate 29	Day 47	12 June 2003	Ten
318	98	Daily Show 40	Day 48	13 June 2003	Ten
319	99	The Insider 7	Day 48	13 June 2003	Ten
320	100	UpLate 30	Day 48	13 June 2003	Ten
321	101	Daily Show 41	Day 50	15 June 2003	Ten
322	102	Live Eviction 6	Day 50	15 June 2003	Ten
Week 8
323	103	Daily Show 42	Day 51	16 June 2003	Ten
324	104	Live Nominations 7	Day 51	16 June 2003	Ten
325	105	UpLate 31	Day 51	16 June 2003	Ten
326	106	Daily Show 43	Day 52	17 June 2003	Ten
327	107	UpLate 32	Day 52	17 June 2003	Ten
328	108	Daily Show 44	Day 53	18 June 2003	Ten
329	109	UpLate 33	Day 53	18 June 2003	Ten
330	110	Daily Show 45	Day 54	19 June 2003	Ten
331	111	Uncut 7	N/A	19 June 2003	Ten
332	112	UpLate 34	Day 54	19 June 2003	Ten
333	113	Daily Show 46	Day 55	20 June 2003	Ten
334	114	The Insider 8	Day 55	20 June 2003	Ten
335	115	UpLate 35	Day 55	20 June 2003	Ten
336	116	Daily Show 47	Day 57	22 June 2003	Ten
337	117	Live Eviction 7	Day 57	22 June 2003	Ten
Week 9
338	118	Daily Show 48	Day 58	23 June 2003	Ten
339	119	Live Nominations 8	Day 58	23 June 2003	Ten
340	120	UpLate 36	Day 58	23 June 2003	Ten
341	121	Daily Show 49	Day 59	24 June 2003	Ten
342	122	UpLate 37	Day 59	24 June 2003	Ten
343	123	Daily Show 50	Day 60	25 June 2003	Ten
344	124	UpLate 38	Day 60	25 June 2003	Ten
345	125	Daily Show 51	Day 61	26 June 2003	Ten
346	126	Uncut 8	N/A	26 June 2003	Ten
347	127	UpLate 39	Day 61	26 June 2003	Ten
348	128	Daily Show 52	Day 62	27 June 2003	Ten
349	129	The Insider 9	Day 62	27 June 2003	Ten
350	130	UpLate 40	Day 62	27 June 2003	Ten
351	131	Daily Show 53	Day 64	29 June 2003	Ten
352	132	Live Eviction 8	Day 64	29 June 2003	Ten
Week 10
353	133	Daily Show 54	Day 65	30 June 2003	Ten
354	134	Live Nominations 9	Day 65	30 June 2003	Ten
355	135	UpLate 41	Day 65	30 June 2003	Ten
356	136	Daily Show 55	Day 66	1 July 2003	Ten
357	137	UpLate 42	Day 66	1 July 2003	Ten
358	138	Daily Show 56	Day 67	2 July 2003	Ten
359	139	UpLate 43	Day 67	2 July 2003	Ten
360	140	Daily Show 57	Day 68	3 July 2003	Ten
361	141	Guess Who’s Coming To Dinner?	Day 68	3 July 2003	Ten
362	142	Uncut 9	N/A	3 July 2003	Ten
363	143	UpLate 44	Day 68	3 July 2003	Ten
364	144	Daily Show 58	Day 69	4 July 2003	Ten
365	145	The Insider 10	Day 69	4 July 2003	Ten
366	146	UpLate 45	Day 69	4 July 2003	Ten
367	147	Daily Show 59	Day 71	6 July 2003	Ten
368	148	Live Eviction 9	Day 71	6 July 2003	Ten
Week 11
369	149	Daily Show 60	Day 72	7 July 2003	Ten
370	150	Live Nominations 10	Day 72	7 July 2003	Ten
371	151	UpLate 46	Day 72	7 July 2003	Ten
372	152	Daily Show 61	Day 73	8 July 2003	Ten
373	153	UpLate 47	Day 73	8 July 2003	Ten
374	154	Daily Show 62	Day 74	9 July 2003	Ten
375	155	UpLate 48	Day 74	9 July 2003	Ten
376	156	Daily Show 63	Day 75	10 July 2003	Ten
377	157	UpLate 49	Day 75	10 July 2003	Ten
378	158	Daily Show 64	Day 76	11 July 2003	Ten
379	159	The Insider 11	Day 76	11 July 2003	Ten
380	160	UpLate 50	Day 76	11 July 2003	Ten
381	161	Daily Show 65	Day 78	13 July 2003	Ten
382	162	Live Eviction 10	Day 78	13 July 2003	Ten
Week 12
383	163	Daily Show 66	Day 79	14 July 2003	Ten
384	164	The Final Countdown	Day 79	14 July 2003	Ten
385	165	UpLate 51	Day 79	14 July 2003	Ten
386	166	Daily Show 67	Day 80	15 July 2003	Ten
387	167	UpLate 52	Day 80	15 July 2003	Ten
388	168	Daily Show 68	Day 81	16 July 2003	Ten
389	169	UpLate 53	Day 81	16 July 2003	Ten
390	170	Daily Show 69	Day 82	17 July 2003	Ten
391	171	UpLate 54	Day 82	17 July 2003	Ten
392	172	Daily Show 70	Day 83	18 July 2003	Ten
393	173	The Insider 12	Day 83	18 July 2003	Ten
394	174	UpLate 55	Day 83	18 July 2003	Ten
395	175	Daily Show 71	Day 85	20 July 2003	Ten
396	176	Live Eviction 11	Day 85	20 July 2003	Ten
Week 13
397	177	The Final Eviction (Live Finale)	Day 86	21 July 2003	Ten

=== Specials ===
No.	Title	Original release date
398	Reggie Rules	28 July 2003
A post-season special celebrating third season winner Reggie, featuring footage from the days following her win, as well as its impact on her hometown. The special also featured exclusive interviews with Reggie, her family, friends and former Housemates. It was narrated by Mike Goldman.
399	Would You? Could You? Should You?	4 December 2003
A special that aired after the third season, featuring audition tips, advice and information about the casting process for the then-forthcoming fourth season. It was hosted by Gretel Killeen.

== Nominations table ==
Colour key:

Winner
Runner-up
Nominated
Walked
Immune
No Nominations
Intruder Vote
Evicted
Original Round Housemate
Original Square Housemate

	Week 2		Week 3		Week 4	Week 5	Week 6	Week 7	Week 8	Week 9	Week 10	Week 11	Week 12		Nomination points received
	Evict	Stay	Nominations	Intruder Eviction	Week 4	Week 5	Week 6	Week 7	Week 8	Week 9	Week 10	Week 11	Day 85	Finale	Nomination points received
Regina	Leah; Joanne	2–Patrick; 1–Daniel	2–Leah; 1–Daniel	Nominated	2–Vincent; 1–Leah	2–Vincent; 1–Joanne	2–Joanne; 1–Vincent	2–Joanne; 1–Daniel	~~2–Saxon~~; ~~1–Chrissie~~	2–Jamie; 1–Patrick	2–Vincent; 1–Patrick	2–Daniel; 1–Patrick	No nominations	Winner (Day 86)	16
Chrissie	Leah; Ben	2–Daniel; 1–Regina	2–Leah; 1–Ben	Jaime	2–Leah; 1–Patrick	2–Ben; 1–Saxon	2–Claire; 1–Saxon	2–Regina; 1–Saxon	~~2–Vincent~~; ~~1–Patrick~~	2–Vincent; 1–Patrick	2–Vincent; 1–Patrick	2–Patrick; 1–Regina	No nominations	Runner-Up (Day 86)	21
Daniel	Leah; Patrick	2–Chrissie; 1–Ben	2–Ben; 1–Leah	Jaime	2–Leah; 1–Saxon	2–Ben; 1–Vincent	2–Saxon; 1–Vincent	2–Joanne; 1–Patrick	~~2–Vincent~~; ~~1–Saxon~~	2–Patrick; 1–Vincent	2–Patrick; 1–Vincent	2–Patrick; 1–Regina	No nominations	Evicted (Day 85)	35
Patrick	Leah; Chrissie	2–Joanne; 1–Regina	2–Leah; 1–Chrissie	Claire	2–Leah; 1–Daniel	2–Ben; 1–Belinda	2–Saxon; 1–Chrissie	2–Saxon; 1–Chrissie	~~2–Saxon~~; ~~1–Chrissie~~	2–Chrissie; 1–Jamie	2–Chrissie; 1–Regina	2–Chrissie; 1–Regina	Evicted (Day 78)		26
Vincent	Saxon; Irena	2–Carlo; 1–Belinda	2–Belinda; 1–Carlo	Regina	2–Belinda; 1–Daniel	2–Ben; 1–Regina	2–Daniel; 1–Saxon	2–Chrissie; 1–Regina	~~2–Patrick~~; ~~1–Kim~~	2–Jamie; 1–Patrick	2–Regina; 1–Chrissie	Evicted (Day 71)			26
Jamie	Not in House							Exempt	~~2–Kim~~; ~~1–Vincent~~	2–Daniel; 1–Vincent	Evicted (Day 64)				9
Saxon	Vincent; Jaime	2–Carlo; 1–Claire	2–Jaime; 1–Belinda	Jaime	2–Belinda; 1–Daniel	2–Belinda; 1–Chrissie	2–Patrick; 1–Daniel	2–Daniel; 1–Regina	~~2–Jamie~~; ~~1–Kim~~	Evicted (Day 57)					21
Kim	Not in House							Exempt	~~2–Jamie~~; ~~1–Vincent~~	Evicted (Day 57)					4
Joanne	Leah; Daniel	2–Patrick; 1–Chrissie	2–Leah; 1–Daniel	Jaime	2–Leah; 1–Daniel	2–Ben; 1–Daniel	2–Daniel; 1–Claire	2–Daniel; 1–Regina	Evicted (Day 50)						9
Claire	Saxon; Belinda	2–Carlo; 1–Vincent	2–Belinda; 1–Jaime	Nominated	2–Belinda; Daniel	2–Belinda; 1–Ben	2–Daniel; 1–Saxon	Evicted (Day 43)							9
Ben	Leah; Chrissie	2–Patrick; 1–Regina	2–Daniel; 1–Chrissie	Nominated	2–Daniel; 1–Belinda	2–Chrissie; 1–Belinda	Evicted (Day 36)								17
Belinda	Vincent; Carlo	2–Jaime; 1–Claire	2–Carlo; 1–Vincent	Claire	2–Saxon; 1–Leah	2–Saxon; 1–Ben	Walked (Day 31)								22
Leah	Ben; Daniel	2–Patrick; 1–Regina	2–Daniel; 1–Ben	Ben	2–Daniel; 1–Joanne	Evicted (Day 29)									19
Carlo	Vincent; Belinda	2–Claire; 1–Irena	2–Belinda; 1–Jaime	Jaime	Evicted (Day 22)										13
Jaime	Saxon; Carlo	2–Vincent; 1–Claire	Carlo; 1–Belinda	Nominated	Evicted (Day 20)										6
Irena	Belinda; Vincent	2–Carlo; 1–Claire	Evicted (Day 15)												1
Notes	1		2	3	4	5	none	6	7	none			8	9	
Nominations	Belinda, Ben, Irena, Leah, Saxon		Ben, Claire, Jaime, Regina	Belinda, Carlo, Daniel, Leah	Belinda, Daniel, Leah	~~Belinda,~~; Ben, Chrissie, Saxon, Vincent	Claire, Daniel, Saxon	Daniel, Joanne, Regina	Chrissie, Daniel, Jamie, Kim, Patrick, Regina, Saxon, Vincent	Jamie, Patrick, Vincent	Chrissie, Patrick, Regina, Vincent	Chrissie, Daniel, Patrick, Regina	Chrissie, Daniel, Regina	Chrissie, Regina	
Walked	none					Belinda	none								
Evicted	Irena; 33% to evict		Carlo; 66% to evict	Jaime; 5 of 9 votes to evict	Leah; 41% to evict	Ben; 73% to evict	Claire; 60% to evict	Joanne; 86% to evict	Kim; 29.07% to evict	Jamie; 50% to evict	Vincent; 62% to evict	Patrick; 50% to evict	Daniel; 51% to evict	Chrissie; 72% to evict	
Evicted	Irena; 33% to evict		Carlo; 66% to evict	Jaime; 5 of 9 votes to evict	Leah; 41% to evict	Ben; 73% to evict	Claire; 60% to evict	Joanne; 86% to evict	Saxon; 18.83% to evict	Jamie; 50% to evict	Vincent; 62% to evict	Patrick; 50% to evict	Daniel; 51% to evict	Chrissie; 72% to evict	
Saved	Ben; 32% Leah; 22% Belinda; 8% Saxon; 5%		Leah; 15% Belinda; 12% Daniel; 7%	Claire; 2 votes Ben; 1 vote Regina; 1 vote	Belinda; 35% Daniel; 24%	Vincent; 8% Chrissie; 8% Saxon; 7% ~~Belinda~~; ~~4%~~	Saxon; 28% Daniel; 12%	Daniel; 9% Regina; 5%	? 18.72%	Vincent; 31% Patrick; 19%	? 20% ? 10% ? 8%	? 22% ? 20% ? 8%	Chrissie; Regina	Regina; 28% to evict	

=== Notes ===
- ^Note 1: Housemates could only nominate others from their respective house. This week, Housemates nominated to evict and to stay. However, the nominations to evict had no value, and the Housemates nominated for eviction were the ones with the fewest points to stay.
- ^Note 2: On Day 17, both houses were tasked with choosing a male and female Housemate who were not nominated to be Intruders to the other house - all four Intruders would face eviction, but the survivors would have immunity the following week. Ben and Regina were sent to the Square House, while Claire (by default) and Jamie were sent to the Round House. After the swap, the Intruders were secretly told that the Intruder Evicted would also receive a consolation prize of $10,000. On Day 19, the Housemates voted in the Intruder Eviction; ranking the Intruders in the order they wished to evict, resulting in Jamie's eviction on Day 20.
- ^Note 3: Housemates could only nominate others from their respective house.
- ^Note 4: The Houses merged on the morning of Day 22. As a result of surviving the Intruder Eviction, Ben, Claire, and Regina were immune from eviction this week.
- ^Note 5: Belinda was nominated for Week 4's Eviction but left the house on Day 31. Her 4% vote tally reflects the votes received before she left.
- ^Note 6: Intruders Jamie and Kim did not vote in Nominations, they were also Immune.
- ^Note 7: Week 8's nominations were fake, and it was revealed after voting that all housemates were nominated for a Double Eviction.
- ^Note 8: There were no Nominations in Week 12. The final three housemates automatically faced Australia's Vote.
- ^Note 9: For the finale, Australia voted to evict between the final two housemates. The winner of Big Brother Australia 2003 and the $250,000 grand prize would be the finalist with the fewest votes to evict.

== Controversies and incidents ==
=== Sixteenth housemate withdrawal ===
Approximately 45 minutes before the live premiere, Queensland police detective Brett Jensen withdrew from the series after being advised by Police Commissioner Bob Atkinson that taking part would be “unprofessional” and not in the interests of the service. Despite knowing of his withdrawal, Network Ten did not initially inform viewers or media outlets, and Jensen was still described as the “official” sixteenth housemate. Tamara, a travel agent and the 16th housemate, appeared on the Launch show but did not enter the house as she was a decoy for the public. Both were from Queensland.

=== "Belindagate" ===
A major incident during the 2003 series involved a scandal surrounding housemate Belinda Thorpe, later referred to by the media as “Belindagate.” After a night of drinking, Thorpe confided to fellow contestant Carlo and Vincent that her younger sister had been involved in the murder of a homosexual man, and gave a graphic account of the circumstances of the victim's death. The conversation was not initially audible to production due to whispering, but when Carlo relayed the information to the other housemates, the details including the use of her sister's name were captured on the live internet stream. Because identifying a minor involved in an active court case is illegal in Queensland, the broadcast was cut within seconds and left blank for several hours, but only after the information had aired. Disturbed by the account, other participants repeatedly questioned Thorpe for further information.

The concern did not stem from Thorpe's graphic reference to the homicide itself—proceedings against her sister were already underway—but rather from her disclosure of her underage sister's identity, which constituted a legal violation by publicly identifying a minor involved in an active trial. The revelation caused a legal crisis for Endemol Southern Star and Network Ten and online discussion about the incident quickly spread. A few weeks later, Belinda withdrew from the house, though not solely as a result of the incident, becoming the first contestant in the program’s history to leave voluntarily. The episode subsequently triggered a surge of complaints and hostile correspondence directed at the show's official website. Producers later acknowledged the event in Daily Show 13, and an edited version was included in Big Brother Uncut except in Queensland, where it was omitted entirely. Thorpe’s sister was later convicted and sentenced to six years in prison.

=== Hot tub scene uproar ===
Former UK contestant Anouska Golebiewski, who had been evicted from the British edition after one week, entered the house on day 68. Shortly after entering the house, she participated in a scene in the hot tub with fellow contestants Patrick and Vincent. During the interaction, Golebiewski removed her bikini top and engaged in playful and flirtatious behavior with the two housemates, including close physical contact such as nibbling their ears and briefly placing Vincent's head against her chest. The male contestants allegedly appeared awkward during the interaction, showing some hesitation as Golebiewski engaged in flirtatious behavior. The scene received significant attention in British media coverage of the program due to its provocative nature, particularly as Golebiewski was reported to be in a relationship at the time.

== Special episodes ==
In addition to the above post season specials, a number of special episodes also aired during the original run of the season. These included:

- Live Surprise
- The New Housemates
- Round House Surprise
- The Final Housemates
- The Party's Over
- Meet The Neighbours – Housemates were introduced to their newly combined house on the morning of Day 23, and later that day a connecting bathroom between the two bedrooms was unveiled.
- Intruder Eviction
- Intruder Alert
- Guess Who's Coming To Dinner? – Anouska Golebiewski from the Big Brother 4 (UK) house joins the house as a guest.
- The Final Countdown
