= Big Brother (British TV series) series 4 =

Coordinates: 51°39′23″N 0°16′02″W

Big Brother
- Series 4
- Series four logo
- Presented by: Davina McCall
- No. of days: 64
- No. of housemates: 13
- Winner: Cameron Stout
- Runner-up: Ray Shah
- Companion shows: Big Brother's Little Brother; Big Brother Live; Nominations Uncut; Saturday Night Live
- No. of episodes: 73

Release
- Original network: Channel 4
- Original release: 23 May – 25 July 2003

Series chronology
- ← Previous; Series 3 Next → Series 5

Big Brother 2003, also known as Big Brother 4, is the fourth series of the British reality television series Big Brother. The show followed thirteen contestants, known as housemates, who were isolated from the outside world for an extended period of time in a custom built House. Each week, one or more of the housemates were evicted by a public vote. The last remaining housemate, Cameron Stout, was declared the winner, winning a cash prize of £70,000.

As with the previous three series, Big Brother 4 lasted 64 days. It launched on Channel 4 on 23 May 2003 and ended on 25 July 2003. Davina McCall returned as presenter for her fourth consecutive year. Twelve housemates entered on launch night, with one additional housemate being introduced in the sixth week. The series was watched by an average of 4.6 million viewers, the fourth highest viewed series of the show to date (joint with Big Brother 6).

Big Brother 4 has since been regarded as one of the most "boring" series of the British edition of the show. It did, however, become memorable for a bomb scare that led to the temporary evacuation of the House, and for being the first UK series of Big Brother to feature a double eviction, foreign housemate exchange and a return of a previously evicted housemate.

== Housemates ==
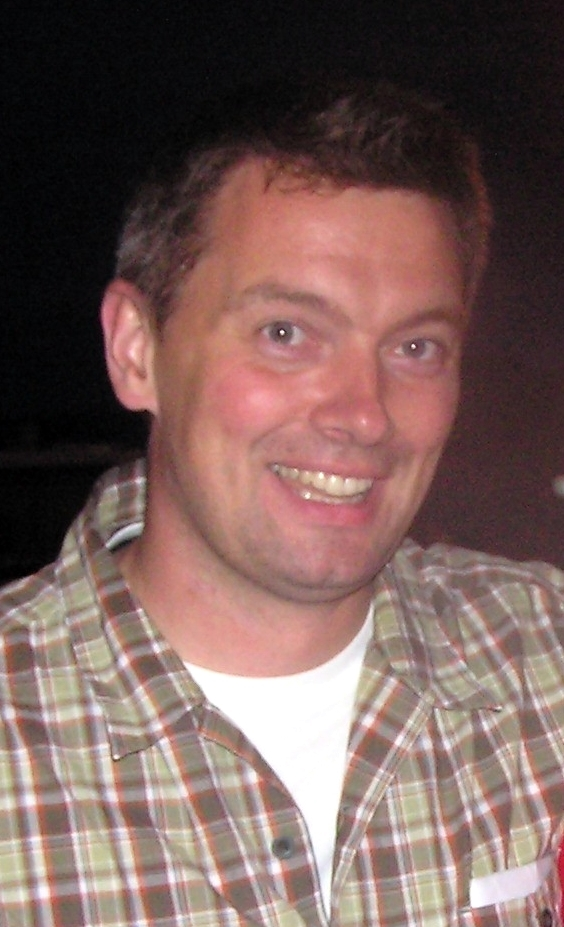
Cameron Stout

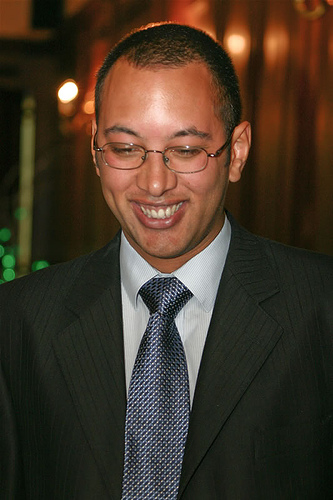
Jonathan "Jon" Tickle

Name	Age on entry	Hometown	Day entered	Day exited	Result
Cameron Stout	32	Stromness, Orkney	1	64	Winner
Ray Shah	25	Dublin	1	64	Runner-up
Scott Turner	27	Liverpool	1	64	3rd place
Steph Coldicott	27	Redditch	1	64	4th place
Annuszka "Nush" Nowak	23	Worcestershire	1	57	Evicted
Lisa Jeynes	35	South Wales	37	50	Evicted
Herjender "Gos" Gosal	31	London	1	44	Evicted
Tânia do Nascimento	22	London	1	36	Evicted
Jonathan "Jon" Tickle	29	Staines	1	29	Evicted (Note: Jon re-entered the House as a guest not eligible to win on Day 50 after winning a public vote to return. He stayed in the House as a guest until the live final on Day 64.)
Federico Martone	23	Glasgow	1	29	Evicted
Joanne "Sissy" Rooney	26	Toxteth	1	22	Evicted
Justine Sellman	27	Leeds	1	15	Evicted
Anouska Golebiewski	20	Greater Manchester	1	8	Evicted

=== Future Appearances ===
Housemates from Big Brother 4 failed to make many appearances in future regular series' since their evictions. However, the first evictee, Anouska, would continue to make regular appearances on the Big Brother franchise, first as a guest on Big Brother Australia 3, as a houseguest for 10 days in the final weeks of the season. Her stay was 2 days longer than her time as a housemate in the UK. Then she was a participant in the 2004 spin-off series Big Brother Panto, along with other housemates from the first five series'. Housemate Federico later appeared in Big Brother 10, participating in a task celebrating ten years of the series, and Ultimate Big Brother saw housemate Lisa make an appearance participating in a task inspired by her time in Big Brother 4, and Jon also made a short appearance in a task.

== Nominations table ==
	Week 1	Week 2	Week 3	Week 4	Week 5	Week 6	Week 7	Week 8	Week 9 Final		Nominations received
Cameron	Anouska	Jon, Tânia	Jon, Federico	Jon, Federico	Tânia, Nush	Nush, Ray	Not eligible	Nush, Ray	Winner (Day 64)		11
Ray	Jon	Jon, Justine	Jon, Cameron	Jon, Cameron	Tânia, Steph	Nush, Gos	Cameron, Lisa, Steph	Nush, Cameron	Runner-up (Day 64)		11
Scott	Anouska	Steph, Jon	Steph, Jon	Jon, Cameron	Steph, Tânia	Gos, Steph	Not eligible	Steph, Cameron	Third place (Day 64)		7
Steph	Federico	Scott, Federico	Jon, Sissy	Federico, Ray	Ray, Nush	Ray, Nush	Not eligible	Scott, Nush	Fourth place (Day 64)		11
Nush	Scott	Ray, Jon	Jon, Federico	Federico, Jon	Gos, Steph	Steph, Gos	Not eligible	Steph, Cameron	Evicted (Day 57)		11
Lisa	Not in House					Exempt	Not eligible	Evicted (Day 50)			1
Gos	Anouska	Justine, Jon	Federico, Sissy	Federico, Scott	Ray, Nush	Ray, Nush	Evicted (Day 44)				5
Tânia	Jon	Cameron, Sissy	Jon, Sissy	Cameron, Jon	Gos, Scott	Evicted (Day 36)					6
Jon	Anouska	Justine, Federico	Sissy, Nush	Federico, Ray	Evicted (Day 29)			Guest (Day 50–64)			21
Federico	Jon	Justine, Tânia	Cameron, Steph	Tânia, Cameron	Evicted (Day 29)						12
Sissy	Anouska	Ray, Scott	Scott, Federico	Evicted (Day 22)							5
Justine	Anouska	Jon, Ray	Evicted (Day 15)								4
Anouska	Jon	Evicted (Day 8)									6
Notes	1	none		2	3	4	5	6	6, 7		
Against public vote	Anouska, Federico, Jon, Scott	Jon, Justine	Federico, Jon, Sissy	Cameron, Federico, Jon	Nush, Steph, Tânia	Gos, Nush, Ray	Cameron, Lisa, Steph	Cameron, Nush	Cameron, Ray, Scott, Steph		
Evicted	Anouska; 46% to evict	Justine; 57% to evict	Sissy; 45% to evict	Federico; 40% to evict	Tânia; 72% to evict	Gos; 46% to evict	Lisa; 82% to evict	Nush; 67% to evict	Steph; 7% (out of 4)	Scott; 27% (out of 3)	
Evicted	Anouska; 46% to evict	Justine; 57% to evict	Sissy; 45% to evict	Jon; 37% to evict	Tânia; 72% to evict	Gos; 46% to evict	Jon; 62% to return	Nush; 67% to evict	Ray; 43% (out of 2)	Cameron; 57% to win	

Notes

- ^Note 1: On Launch Night, shortly after entering the house, all housemates had to nominate one fellow housemate based on first impressions. Any housemate who received a nomination automatically faced eviction.
- ^Note 2: Week 4 was a double eviction. The three or more housemates with the most nominations faced the public vote, and the two people with the most votes to evict left the house on Day 29.
- ^Note 3: Cameron made his nominations from the Big Brother House in South Africa over the phone to Gaetano. Even though he could nominate, none of his fellow housemates could nominate him.
- ^Note 4: As a new housemate, Lisa could not nominate and could not be nominated by her fellow housemates. As Cameron had only recently returned to the house from South Africa, he also could not be nominated by his fellow housemates, however he could still nominate. Due to a bomb scare on Day 43, the scheduled eviction for Week 6 was postponed to the following day. That week's evictee, Gos, left the house to no crowd outside the house.
- ^Note 5: Ray, as leader of the house in Week 7, was the only one who could nominate, and had to nominate three people. Following Lisa's eviction on Day 50, voting lines opened for the public to vote for an evicted housemate (either Justine, Sissy, Federico, Jon, Gos, or Lisa) to return to the house. As a guest in the Big Brother Australia house, Anouska was ineligible to go back, neither was Tania, who refused to return. As the chosen ex-housemate, Jon was granted re-entry into the house, but was ineligible to win.
- ^Note 6: Because Jon was a guest in the house, and was not eligible to win, he could not nominate and could not be nominated by his fellow housemates.
- ^Note 7: There were no nominations in the final week. The public voted for who they wanted to win, rather than evict.

== Weekly summary ==
Week 1	Entrances	On Day 1, Anouska, Cameron, Federico, Gos, Jon, Justine, Nush, Ray, Scott, Sissy, Steph and Tânia entered the house.
Week 1	Twists	Upon entering the house, Davina told the housemates that they would all be nominating one housemate for eviction. If a housemates received at least one vote, they would automatically be nominated for eviction.
Week 1	Tasks	On Day 3, the housemates were given their first shopping task. They were required to power a pedalo non-stop for 72 hours. The housemates wagered 50% of their weekly shopping budget on the task. The housemates failed their shopping task.
Week 1	Nominations	Anouska, Federico, Jon and Scott received at least one nomination and faced the public vote.
Week 1	Exits	On Day 8, Anouska was evicted from the house, receiving 46% of the public vote to evict.
Week 2	Tasks	On Day 9, the housemates were given a task to earn entry into the reward room. The housemates were split into two teams to play a game of tug of war. The green team consisted of Gos, Jon, Justine, Scott and Steph. The yellow team consisted of Cameron, Federico, Nush, Ray and Tânia. Sissy was the umpire. The green team won the challenge and gained access to the reward room.; On Day 10, the housemates were given their next weekly shopping task, in which the housemates were given a chance to become honorary members of the Cub Scouts. The housemates wagered 65% of their weekly shopping budget on the task. The housemates failed their shopping task.
Week 2	Nominations	The housemates nominated for the second time. Jon and Justine received the most nominations and faced the public vote.
Week 2	Exits	On Day 15, Justine was evicted from the house, receiving 57% of the public vote to evict.
Week 3	Tasks	On Day 16, the housemates took part in a game of pass the parcel to decide who would earn entry into the reward room. Cameron, Federico, Gos, Jon, Nush, Scott and Tânia all won access to the reward room.; On Day 17, the housemates were given their next weekly shopping task, in which they had to memorize and perform a musical tune on a set of handbells. The housemates wagered 65% of their weekly shopping budget on the task. The housemates failed their shopping task.; On Day 20, the housemates were given a task in which they had to name the tune that they had been performing as part of their shopping task. The housemates passed this task and earned a Chinese takeaway.
Week 3	Nominations	The housemates nominated for the third time. Federico, Jon and Sissy received the most nominations and faced the public vote.
Week 3	Exits	On Day 22, Sissy was evicted from the house, receiving 45% of the public vote to evict.
Week 4	Tasks	On Day 23, the housemates took part in a game of charades to decide who would earn entry into the reward room. Cameron, Federico, Nush, Ray, Steph and Tânia all won access to the reward room.; On Day 24, the housemates were given their next weekly shopping task, in which they had to create superhero alter egos and perform tasks within their chosen alter ego. The housemates wagered 85% of their weekly shopping budget. The housemates passed their shopping task.
Week 4	Nominations	The housemates nominated for the fourth time. Cameron, Federico and Jon received the most nominations and faced the public vote.
Week 4	Exits	On Day 29, Federico and Jon were both evicted from the house, receiving 40% and 37% of the public vote to evict, respectively.
Week 5	Entrances	On Day 32, Gaetano, from the Big Brother House in South Africa, entered the house as a surprise international Big Brother swap.
Week 5	Twists	On Day 31, Cameron was chosen to travel to the Big Brother House in South Africa. He was swapped with Big Brother Africa housemate Gaetano. Cameron returned to the house on Day 36.
Week 5	Tasks	On Day 30, the housemates took part in a geography quiz to determine who would earn entry into the reward room. Cameron won the task and chose Gos, Ray, Scott, Steph and Tania to join him.; On Day 33, the housemates were given their next weekly shopping task, in which they had to memorize facts about each other. The housemates wagered 95% of their weekly shopping budget. The housemates passed their shopping task.
Week 5	Nominations	The housemates nominated for the fifth time. Nush, Steph and Tânia received the most nominations and faced the public vote.
Week 5	Exits	On Day 35, Gaetano left the Big Brother UK house and returned to the Big Brother Africa house.; On Day 36, Tânia was evicted from the house, receiving 72% of the public vote to evict.
Week 6	Entrances	On Day 37, Lisa entered the house.
Week 6	Tasks	On Day 37, the housemates each drew straws to determine who would earn entry into the reward room. All housemates earned entry into the reward room.; On Day 38, the housemates were given their next weekly shopping task, in which they had to take part in gymkhana. The housemates wagered 100% of their weekly shopping budget. The housemates passed their shopping task.
Week 6	Nominations	The housemates nominated for the sixth time. Gos, Nush and Ray received the most nominations and faced the public vote. Due to being a new housemate, Lisa was exempt from the nomination process.
Week 6	Exits	On Day 44, Gos was evicted from the house, receiving 46% of the public vote to evict.
Week 7	Entrances	On Day 50, Jon was chosen by the public to re-enter the house as a guest. He would stay until the final day, but would be ineligible to win.
Week 7	Tasks	On Day 45, housemates had to choose a robot animal to represent them in a race. Ray won the challenge and became the Head of House. Cameron lost the challenge and was the only housemate not permitted to enter the reward room.; On Day 48, the housemates were given their next weekly shopping task, in which Ray had to gamble money from the shopping budget on the spin of a roulette wheel. Ray won the group a shopping budget of £2.
Week 7	Nominations	Due to being the Head of House, Ray was the only housemate permitted to nominate this week. He nominated Cameron, Lisa and Steph, and they faced the public vote.
Week 7	Exits	On Day 50, Lisa was evicted from the house, receiving 82% of the public vote to evict.
Week 8	Tasks	On Day 51, the housemates played a game of bingo to determine who would earn entry into the reward room. Ray won the task and chose Cameron to join him in the reward room.; On Day 52, the housemates played another game of bingo to determine who would earn entry into the reward room. Scott won the task and chose Nush to join him in the reward room.; On Day 54, the housemates were given their next weekly shopping task, in which the housemates had to write and perform six songs based on their experiences in the house. The housemates passed their shopping task and earned a luxury shopping budget.
Week 8	Nominations	The housemates nominated for the eighth and final time this season. Cameron and Nush received the most nominations and faced the public vote.
Week 8	Exits	On Day 57, Nush was evicted from the house, receiving 67% of the public vote to evict.
Week 9	Tasks	On Day 58, the housemates had five minutes to find five needles in a hay stack that Big Brother had placed in the garden. The housemates found two needles in the hay stack and earned two nights in the reward room.; On Day 59, the housemates were given their final weekly shopping task, in which they were given various topics to discuss about for a minimum of ten minutes. The housemates failed their shopping task.
Week 9	Exits	On Day 64, Steph left the house in fourth place and Scott left the house in third place. It was then revealed that Cameron was the winner, leaving Ray as the runner-up.

== Production ==
=== Auditions ===
Potential housemates applied by sending producers a home video that stated why they should be housemates. Successful candidates were invited to further rounds of auditions. This was the last year to feature this audition format as from Big Brother 5, open auditions were used to select housemates.

Big Brother 4 had more than 10,000 applicants apply to be a housemate.

=== Presenters ===
Davina McCall continued to host the main show and Dermot O'Leary continued to host the spin-off show, Big Brother's Little Brother. Marcus Bentley continued to narrate the show.

=== Promotion ===
This series was promoted as being a 'Back to Basics' edition; following the twists to the format introduced within the past series.

=== Eye logo ===
The shape of the eye remained the same as the previous year, but a different art design was used. The eye was multi-coloured with black and white stripes beaming from the pupil of the eye.

=== Sponsorship ===
The series was the last to be sponsored by O2. The mobile network had sponsored Big Brother since Big Brother 2 in 2001.

=== Promotion controversy ===
To promote the series, a large 210ft hill figure of the eye logo was painted on the top of White Horse Hill, Oxfordshire, right above the famous Uffington White Horse, believed to be around 3,000 years old. The eye first appeared on 1 May 2003 and was created by seven circlemakers. Although permission for the figure's construction was agreed to by The National Trust, the figure angered local residents. It was washed off the day after completion.

This figure was one of several examples of the eye being presented as a geoglyph to promote the fourth series. Others included another hill figure, approximately half the size of that at Uffington, being placed next to Urquhart Castle, Loch Ness, Scotland, which appeared from 3–5 May, alongside a crop circle in a secret location in Southern England and as a depiction on a beach in Kidwelly, Wales.

=== Broadcasts ===
The series premiered on 23 May 2003, on Channel 4. The contestants were recorded 24 hours a day with cameras fixed around the house, and the wearing of portable microphones mandatory. Big Brother 4 was the second regular series to feature a live launch. The series ended on 25 July 2003, lasting for a total of 64 days. Channel 4 broadcast a 30-minute highlights show nightly, with each Friday episode being a live episode that saw one of the housemates evicted from the house. Live coverage from the house also remained a huge part of E4's daily and nightly schedule. A new show named Nominations Uncut was broadcast on E4 every Tuesday, in which it would show housemates nominations in full, rather than edited clips as seen in the main show. During Cameron's visit to Africa, E4 showed highlights of his stay straight after the main Channel 4 show.

=== House ===
The Big Brother house has been located at Elstree Studios, Borehamwood, Hertfordshire since the third series of the show. The house featured a completely new look compared to the previous series. The living room for this series was one-third smaller than the one featured in the previous series, and features red and green couches and chairs. The kitchen remained simple in design, with only necessities such as an oven, fridge, and sink included. The dining table was located beside the kitchen and was coloured yellow and white. The Diary Room featured a soft pink coloured background and contained a large blue chair. Like previous editions of the series, there were two bedrooms in this series, with the two being located beside one another for the first time. Big Brother 4 saw the return of the chicken coop in the garden, a feature used in the first two series. The chickens were used as a source of food (eggs), thus the housemates were not required to buy eggs as a part of their weekly shopping list. The house garden also included a large seating area and a vegetable patch which the housemates could use to grow plants and vegetables to eat. This series introduced the Rewards Room, where the winning housemates of the weekly live task were invited and were often thrown a party.

=== Format changes ===
Big Brother 4 featured an opening night twist, like the previous two series. Housemates had to nominate one housemate for eviction on the first night, and any housemates who received even one nomination were automatically up against the public vote.

Later in the series, housemate, Cameron Stout, accepted a challenge from Big Brother and discovered it meant spending a week in the Big Brother Africa house. Housemate Gaetano spent time in the Big Brother 4 house while Cameron was in Africa.

Big Brother 4 was the first series to feature a double eviction, with two out of the three nominated housemates being evicted on Day 29. On Day 37, Lisa entered the house as part of a twist. This series was also the first to allow previously evicted housemates to return, with ex-housemate Jon entering the house for a second time on Day 50. He remained in the house until the finale, but was ineligible to win the grand prize.

== Reception ==
Big Brother 4 averaged a total of 4.6 million viewers throughout the course of the series, a decrease from the 5.8 million series average from Big Brother 3, however Big Brother 4 did have a slightly higher series average than the first two series of Big Brother UK.

The series is often regarded the 'most boring' series to be broadcast in the United Kingdom. Weekly ratings for each show on Channel 4. All numbers are in millions and provided by BARB.

Viewers (in millions)
	Week 1		Week 2	Week 3	Week 4	Week 5	Week 6	Week 7	Week 8	Week 9
Saturday	–	–	3.28	3.39	3.62	3.30; 3.28	4.04; 4.39	3.16	3.23	–
Sunday	–	4.50	4.37	3.67	3.54	3.57	3.84	3.78	3.69	2.41
Monday	–	3.41	4.69	5.00	5.07	5.70	4.92	4.55	4.48	4.89
Tuesday	–	5.10	4.64	4.64	5.13	5.38	5.07	5.01	4.73	4.76
Wednesday	–	3.62	4.40	4.59	4.55	5.01	4.54	4.84	4.52	4.42
Thursday	–	4.54	4.25	4.46	4.66	4.51	4.84	4.95	5.31	4.91
Friday	7.05	3.53	3.78	4.09	4.30	4.69	–	4.67	4.43	6.34
Friday	5.11	5.03	5.41	5.27	5.75; 4.54	5.67	–	6.17	5.45	7.23
Weekly average	4.65		4.35	4.39	4.57	4.57	4.52	4.64	4.48	4.99
Running average	4.65		4.50	4.46	4.49	4.51	4.51	4.53	4.52	4.57
Series average	4.57									

== Bomb scare ==
On Day 43, a sniffer dog found a suspect package near to the house and directly near the stage where Davina McCall interviewed evicted housemates. The package was believed to contain a bomb and was found during a routine security check.

Just before 20:00, housemate Scott was informed in the Diary Room by Big Brother that all housemates were to go to the boys bedroom and remain there until further notice. Around 20:45, Hertfordshire Constabulary police force advised that all housemates were to be evacuated. Production staff and a camera crew entered the house, made them aware of the security alert and evacuated them. They were taken to a secure area on the perimeter of the studio complex, with high levels of security accompanying them.

At 21:35, Marcus Bentley informed the viewers that the Big Brother gallery, where the production crew monitored the house, also had to be evacuated, all filming was required to stop and as a result, cameras were turned off and all filming of the housemates in the secure area wasn't permitted, however they were still required to follow the rules of the show.

A 100-metre cordon was put into force around the house by police where the press and audience were required to wait for their safety. Bomb disposal police carried out a controlled explosion of the suspect package around 22:00 and turned out to be a false alarm. The all clear was given by police around 00:00. Just before 01:00 on Day 44, housemates were permitted by police to re-enter the house.

Two live shows at 20:30 and 22:00, where a housemate was due to be evicted, were cancelled by Channel 4 at short notice and instead, an episode of Friends was broadcast in its place. The eviction went ahead on Day 44 without an outdoor crowd.
