= Four Little Letters =

Single by Stella Parton

from the album Stella Parton
- B-side: "Fade My Blues Away"
- Released: March 1978
- Genre: Country
- Length: 2:10
- Label: Elektra
- Songwriters: Dan Tyler; Even Stevens
- Producers: David Malloy; Jim Malloy

Stella Parton singles chronology
"Standard Lie Number One" (1977)	"Four Little Letters" (1978)	"Undercover Lovers" (1978)

"Four Little Letters" is a song originally recorded by American singer-songwriter, Stella Parton. It was released as a single by Elektra Records in 1978 and made the top-20 on the US country songs chart. It was one of several top-20 singles Parton had in the late 1970s. It was given a positive reception by music publications and was released on her 1978 studio album, Stella Parton.

== Background, recording and content ==
Stella Parton had a music career of her own apart from her sister, Dolly, having a string of top-40 country songs during the 1970s. In the second half of the decade, she had three top-20 songs including "Four Little Letters". The song was composed by Dan Tyler and Even Stevens, along with co-production from David Malloy and Jim Malloy. The track was described by Cashbox as being a "love song".

== Release, critical reception and chart performance ==
"Four Little Letters" was released as a single by Elektra Records in March 1978 and was distributed as a seven-inch vinyl record. It included a B-side titled "Fade My Blues Away". Billboard called it "a sensitive song" that was "delivered convincingly" while Cashbox found it had "a relaxed mood throughout". "Four Little Letters" debuted on the US Billboard Hot Country Songs chart on April 15, 1978 and spent five weeks there, rising to the number 20 position. It became Parton's third consecutive top-20 US country song and fourth to make its top-40 chart. In Canada, it climbed to number 36 on the RPM Country Tracks chart during the same time frame. It was included on Parton's second Elektra studio album, which was released in 1978 and titled Stella Parton.

== Track listing ==
7" vinyl single

1. "Four Little Letters" – 2:10
2. "Fade My Blues Away" – 2:39

== Charts ==
Chart (1978)	Peak position
Canada Country Tracks (RPM)	36
US Hot Country Songs (Billboard)	20
