= Stella Parton (album) =

Studio album by Stella Parton
- Released: March 1978
- Genre: Country
- Label: Elektra
- Producers: David Malloy; Jim Malloy

Stella Parton chronology
Country Sweet (1977)	Stella Parton (1978)	Love Ya (1979)

Singles from Stella Parton
- 1. "Four Little Letters" Released: March 1978; 2. "Undercover Lovers" Released: June 1977

Stella Parton is an eponymous studio album by American singer-songwriter, Stella Parton. It was released in March 1978 by Elektra Records and consisted of ten tracks. The country album featured songs written by Parton herself and Shel Silverstein. Among them were two singles, including the US top-20 song, "Four Little Letters". The album itself made positions on the US and Canadian country LP's charts.

== Background, recording and content ==
Dolly Parton's younger sister, Stella, became a music artist in her own right during the 1970s with several songs that found commercial success on the country charts. Among them was "Four Little Letters", a top-20 single that was found on her 1978 self-titled studio album. The eponymous collection was co-produced by David Malloy and Jim Malloy at Quadraphonic Sound Studios in Nashville, Tennessee, US. According to Billboard, the album featured "songs about love and life" with "spicy fiddling and guitar playing". It consisted of ten tracks, including two that were composed by Parton herself: "Lie to Linda" and "Fade My Blues Away". The final cut, "Down to Earth" and featured vocal harmonies from her family, including Dolly. The third track, "The Late Late Late Show", was written by Shel Silverstein.

== Release and critical reception ==
Stella Parton was released by Elektra Records in March 1978 and was one of several issued by the label that month including discs by Vern Gosdin and Eddie Rabbitt. It was offered in three formats in its original release: a vinyl LP, 8-track cartridge or a cassette. The album received a positive reception. Billboard named it among its "recommended LP's", praising her "lilting voice" and its lively production. Cashbox wrote, "For sure, Stella Parton can stand on her own without any help from sister Dolly. Her confidence has visibly grown on each record, and Stella can work effectively with any kind of material." AllMusic rated it three out of five stars but did not provide a written review.

== Chart performance and singles ==
Stella Parton reached the number 38 position on the US Billboard Top Country Albums chart in 1978. It became her third album to make the chart and final to do to date. It also made Canada's RPM Country Albums chart in 1978, reaching number 21. It is Parton's only album to make the RPM chart in her career. The lead single was "Four Little Letters", which was released in March 1978. It reached number 20 on the US Hot Country Songs chart and number 36 on the Canadian RPM Country Tracks chart. "Undercover Lovers" was then spawned as a single from the collection in June 1978, peaking at number 28 on the US country chart and number 22 on the Canadian country chart.

== Track listing ==
Side one
No.	Title	Writer(s)	Length
1.	"Four Little Letters"	Dan Tyler; Even Stevens	2:10
2.	"Undercover Lovers"	Stevens; Sherry Grooms	1:52
3.	"The Late Late Late Show"	Shel Silverstein	2:43
4.	"Love Is a Word"	Otha Young	2:32
5.	"There's a Rumor Going 'Round"	Bill S. Graham	2:32

Side two
No.	Title	Writer(s)	Length
1.	"Haven't You Heard"	Red Lane; Wayne Kemp	2:19
2.	"Lie to Linda"	Billy Smith; Stella Parton	2:54
3.	"Wishing Well"	Chip Hardy; Sam Lorber	2:24
4.	"Fade My Blues Away"	Parton	2:39
5.	"Down to Earth"	Stevens; Grooms	3:30

== Charts ==
Chart (1978)	Peak position
Canada Country Albums/CD's (RPM)	21
US Top Country Albums (Billboard)	38

== Release history ==
Release history and formats for Stella Parton
Region	Date	Format	Label	Ref.
Various	March 1978	Vinyl LP; cassette; 8-track cartridge	Elektra	
Various	Circa 2017	Compact disc (CD)	Man in the Moon	
Various	Circa 2020	Music download; streaming	Elektra	
