= Celebrity Jigs 'n' Reels =

- Genre: Talent show
- Presented by: Marty Whelan
- Country of origin: Ireland
- Original language: English

Original release
- Network: RTÉ One
- Release: March 2006 – 31 December 2006

Celebrity Jigs n' Reels was an Irish reality entertainment television show broadcast on RTÉ One. It was produced by Mind The Gap Films.

== Broadcast ==
Celebrity Jigs n' Reels originally ran from March 2006 to December 2006.

On 31 December 2006, Celebrity Jigs n'Reels returned with a live New Year show on RTÉ One. Seven celebrities danced for one night only to raise money for charity and bring in 2007. The format differed from the original run in that no celebrity represented a specific charity; instead all the money raised went to Focus Ireland and The Simon Community, both of which look after the homeless. Hilda Fay (from Fair City) was crowned champion, beating former Big Brother star Ray Shah, model Celia Holman Lee, GAA All Star Oisín McConville, and ex Pogues bassist Cait O'Riordan.

== Reception ==
Despite its audience reach, the show attracted some negative reviews. In one, Liam Fay of The Sunday Times wrote, "A three-ring ballet of farce, Celebrity Jigs'n'Reels is a thoroughly ill-conceived effort at creating an Irish version of the celebrity dance tournaments that are so successful on British TV." However, The Irish News's Bill Foley called the show "a cracker", saying, "It could only be watched in 10-minute bursts, but had wonderful powers of cheering up a quite evening." The Sunday Times review of the New Year's special was negative, with Liam Fay writing, "In conception and execution, Celebrity Jigs'n'Reels is a shambles, a doomed attempt to marry the convivial free-for-all of the ceilidh with the stuffy conventions of the ballroom dancing contest."
