= Testimony (Stella Parton album) =

Studio album by Stella Parton
- Released: December 2, 2008
- Recorded: 2007
- Genres: Country, gospel
- Length: 36:40
- Label: Raptor
- Producer: Stella Parton

Stella Parton chronology
In the Spirit (2008)	Testimony (2008)

Singles from Testimony
- 1. "Family Ties" Released: April 2009

Testimony is the seventh studio album by singer Stella Parton. This is her third album since signing with Raptor Records. Coincidentally, it was released the same year as her older sister, Dolly Parton's Backwoods Barbie. It is an inspirational work that includes all original and new songs, highlighting Parton's gifts of the spirit. The track, "I Will Arise", was co-written by her son, Timothy C. Rauhoff.

== Track listing ==
Tracks written by Parton except where noted. The track listing is as follows:

1. Family Ties (Stella Parton, R. Jones)
2. Tell It Sister Tell It
3. No Pride at All (Parton, Jones)
4. I Will Arise (Parton, Timothy Rauhoff)
5. Name Above Every Name (Parton, Jones)
6. Trophy Of Your Grace (Parton, Jones)
7. Keep On Walkin' (Parton, Jones)
8. I Press On (Parton, Jones)
9. I Love My Country (Parton, Jones)
10. Daughter of the King
11. Virtuous Woman (Bonus Track)
