= Narinder Kaur =

English television personality, broadcaster and social commentator (born 1972)

- Born: 3 September 1972 (age 54); West Bromwich, England
- Occupations: Television personality; broadcaster; social commentator
- Years active: 1999–present
- Known for: Big Brother
- Spouse: Jatinder Punia (m. 1995)
- Children: 2
- Website: www.narinderkaur.com

Narinder Kaur (born 3 September 1972) is a British television personality, broadcaster and social commentator. After appearing as a housemate on the second series of Big Brother in 2001, she presented the dating series Undercover Lovers the following year, and has been a guest on programmes including Jeremy Vine, Good Morning Britain, and GB News. Kaur is left-wing and has commentated on various subjects including social issues and immigration, as well as writing pieces for news outlets such as The Times, Glamour UK, and The Daily Mirror.

== Early life and career ==
Kaur was born on 3 September 1972 in West Bromwich, England, to Sikh parents of Punjabi descent. She was raised in Killingworth, North Tyneside and attended George Stephenson High School, where Kaur says she suffered racist bullying.

Kaur moved to Leicester and worked as a medical sales representative.

== Film and media career ==
In 1999, she had a minor role in the Bollywood film Dillagi. In May 2001, Kaur entered the Big Brother house as a housemate on the second series. She was the first British-Indian contestant to appear on the show. She became the third housemate to be evicted on Day 29 of the series after receiving 62% of the vote to evict. Following her time in the house, she published a book Big Brother: The Inside Story in 2007, which was updated and re-published in 2025.

Kaur went on to present the dating series Undercover Lovers for Trouble in 2002. She later returned for the spin-off series Big Brother Panto, which aired between December 2004 and January 2005 and featured former housemates recreating the pantomime Cinderella. In 2012, she had a minor role in two episodes of the Polish series Misja Afghanistan.

Kaur has appeared as a guest on programmes such as Good Morning Britain, GB News, and The Wright Stuff. She became a frequent panellist on Jeremy Vine on Channel 5. In 2025, Kaur appeared as a panellist on several episodes of Vanessa. She has written opinion pieces on identity, racism, and women's empowerment for publications including The Times, Glamour UK, and The Daily Mirror.

== Personal life ==
Kaur married Jatinder Punia in 1995, and they have two children. She developed a friendship with Brian Dowling on Big Brother and was bridesmaid at his wedding.

=== Upskirting ===
In April 2024, actor Laurence Fox posted an intimate "upskirting" image of Kaur, taken over 15 years earlier without her consent, on X (formerly Twitter). Kaur described the incident as "unimaginably mortifying" and waived her right to anonymity to speak out. Fox apologised but maintained the photo's existence was not his fault. The Metropolitan Police charged Fox under section 66A of the Sexual Offences Act 2003. Fox filed a counter-complaint against Kaur for "malicious communication", which was dropped by police in July 2024. Kaur's solicitor accused Fox of attempting to "silence" her. A provisional trial date was set for December 2027.

== Filmography ==
| Year | Title | Role | Notes |
|---|---|---|---|
| 1999 | Dillagi | —N/a | Film role |
| 2001 | Big Brother | Herself | Housemate |
| 2001 | The Big Breakfast | Herself | Guest; 1 episode |
| 2001 | Live & Kicking | Herself | Guest; 1 episode |
| 2002 | Undercover Lovers | Herself | Presenter |
| 2004 | The Pilot Show | Herself | Guest; 2 episodes |
| 2004–2005 | Big Brother Panto | Herself | Housemate |
| 2007 | BBC Breakfast | Herself | Guest |
| 2011–2012 | Big Brother's Bit on the Side | Herself | Guest; 3 episodes |
| 2012 | Misja Afganistan | Woman | 2 episodes |
| 2022–2023 | GB News | Herself | Guest |
| 2022–2024 | Jeremy Vine | Herself | Guest panellist |
| 2025 | Vanessa | Herself | Guest panellist |
