= Ray Shah =

Irish radio and TRV presenter

- Born: 31 January 1978 (age 48); Essex, England
- Occupations: Radio presenter, reality television star
- Years active: 2003–present
- Television: Big Brother UK

Ray Shah (born 31 January 1978) is an Irish reality television star and radio presenter. He is best known for taking part in the fourth series of Big Brother UK.

== Television career ==
In 2003, Shah entered the fourth series of Big Brother UK on Day 1, exiting on Day 64, placing in second place overall.

Shah presented his own television show titled; On The Box, on Dublin's City Channel, he interviewed guests including Dave Couse and former Eurovision contestant Mickey Joe Harte. He participated in RTÉ's New Year's Eve special edition of Celebrity Jigs 'n' Reels.

== Radio career ==
Prior to appearing on Big Brother UK Shah worked as DJ. After leaving the Big Brother house, Shah became a presenter on Dublin's Q102 radio station, and also worked as a presenter on 4fm. He also presented a show on iRadio.

== Personal life ==
In 2012, Shah set up his own business selling sports nutrition supplements.

In 2016, he got engaged to his girlfriend of four years.

== Filmography ==
Television
Year	Title	Roles	Notes
2003	Big Brother UK series 4	Self; housemate	2nd place, 73 episodes
2003	RI:SE	Self; guest	2 episodes
2003	The Panel	Self; guest	1 episode
2004	Football Challenge	Self; Celebrity FC	TV special
2005	Global Beats	Self; presenter	
2005	Ireland AM	Self; guest	1 episode
2006	The Podge and Rodge Show	Self; guest	1 episode
2006	Celebrity Jigs 'n' Reels	Self; contestant	1 episode
2009	Xposé	Self; guest	3 episodes
2010	Friday Night Lock In	Self; guest	1 episode
