= George Stephenson High School =

Location
- Southgate; Killingworth, Tyne and Wear, NE12 6SA; England; 55°01′59″N 1°34′02″W

Information
- Type: Foundation school
- Established: 1953
- Local authority: North Tyneside
- Trust: North Tyneside Learning Trust
- Department for Education URN: 108639 Tables
- Headteacher: P Douthwhaite
- Gender: Coeducational
- Age: 11 to 18
- Enrolment: 1200
- Former name: George Stephenson Grammar School
- Website: Official website

George Stephenson High School is a coeducational secondary school located in Killingworth, North Tyneside, England.

== History ==
=== Grammar school ===
It was called the George Stephenson Grammar School in 1953, at which time it was built on Benton Lane (the Great Lime Road) in West Moor. (George Stephenson lived nearby in a cottage when he worked at Killingworth Colliery.) The current school site in Killingworth is a replacement that opened in 1956, and was originally known as Killingworth High School, a comprehensive, but eventually took the George Stephenson name from the old school.

The headmaster since the opening of the old school in 1953 was Tom W. King, BA. He became headmaster of the new school and finally retired in 1980. When he died in 2010 at the age of 94, a plaque reading "Here, from 1956 to 2004, stood a Place of Learning" was placed on the wall of the West Moor Residents Association Community Centre, which now stands on the site of the old grammar school.

The popularity of the grammar school was such that it had expanded over the years from about 350 pupils (the capacity of the original main building) to about 600 (by the addition of prefabricated classrooms at the rear of the school).

Until 1970 the school had regular morning assemblies for all pupils. The school hymn was "Guide Me O Thou Great Redeemer". The school motto was Praesis Ut Prosis, "Lead in order to serve."

=== Comprehensive ===
It became a comprehensive school in 1970 with the move from the West Moor site to the Killingworth site.

The school was rated Good by Ofsted in November 2019.

== Alumni ==
=== George Stephenson Grammar School ===
- Jack Colback, Footballer at Newcastle United
- Scott Davidson (legal scholar)
- John Sadler (historian)
- Narinder Kaur (television personality)

== See also ==
- Stephenson College, Durham
