= Undercover Lovers =

- Starring: Narinder Kaur
- Country of origin: United Kingdom
- No. of episodes: 15

Production
- Executive producers: Remy Blumenfeld; Gavin Hay
- Running time: 30 mins

Original release
- Network: Trouble
- Release: 2002 – 2002

Undercover Lovers is a British reality show presented by Narinder Kaur, a former Big Brother housemate.

The show featured eight participants (four male and four female), six of whom were contestants, the other two actors hired by the show's producers. The six contestants consisted of three couples with pre-existing relationships, and their task was to live together in a house for five days, concealing their relationship from the other contestants. The two actors were charged with trying to stir up trouble among the housemates. Each series would run over the course of a week (five days) and on the fifth each player would guess one potential couple from among the contestants. At stake was prize money of £5,000.

Disappointing ratings meant that the initial run of three five-part series were the only shows to be produced.

It ran on Trouble in 2002.
