= Big Brother (British TV series) series 2 =

Coordinates: 51°31′39″N 0°0′11″W

Big Brother
- Series 2
- Series two logo
- Presented by: Davina McCall
- No. of days: 64
- No. of housemates: 11
- Winner: Brian Dowling
- Runner-up: Helen Adams
- Companion shows: Big Brother's Little Brother; Big Brother Live
- No. of episodes: 55

Release
- Original network: Channel 4
- Original release: 25 May – 27 July 2001

Series chronology
- ← Previous; Series 1 Next → Series 3

Big Brother 2001, also known as Big Brother 2, is the second series of the British reality television series Big Brother. The show followed eleven contestants, known as housemates, who were isolated from the outside world for an extended period of time in a custom-built House. Each week, one or more of the housemates were evicted by a public vote. The last remaining housemate, Brian Dowling, was declared the winner, winning a cash prize of £70,000.

As with the previous series, Big Brother 2 lasted 64 days. It launched on Channel 4 on 25 May 2001 and ended on 27 July 2001, with Davina McCall returning as presenter. Ten housemates entered on launch night, with one additional housemate being introduced in the third week. The series was watched by an average of 4.5 million viewers, matching the average viewership of the first series. The Final however attracted Big Brother's biggest audience, with 13.7 million viewers - making it Channel 4's second most watched broadcast. It also spawned Big Brother's first ancillary show entitled Big Brother's Little Brother, presented by Dermot O'Leary.

== Format ==
"The show is all about human interactions. It's people who are, loving each other, hating each other. They fight, they cry, they laugh -- all emotions, we'll see in the house."

— Paul Romer, co-creator of the original show, on the social experiment aspect of the series.

Big Brother was a game show in which a group of contestants, referred to as housemates, lived in isolation from the outside world in a custom built "house", constantly under video surveillance. During their time in the House, the housemates were required to nominate two of their fellow contestants for potential eviction, and the two or more with the most votes would be nominated. This process was mandatory for all housemates, and failure to comply could result in ejection from the house. Despite this, should a housemate enter the House following the launch, they are immune from the first round of nominations they are present for. The public, through a vote conducted by phone, would vote to evict one of the nominated housemates from the House, and the housemate with the most votes from the viewers would be evicted from the House. When only four housemates remained, the public would vote for which of them should win the series, and the housemates with the most votes would become the winner. The housemates were competing for a £70,000 cash prize. Books, allowed in Series 1, were banned in Series 2. During their time in the House, housemates were given weekly tasks to perform. The housemates would wager a portion of their weekly shopping budget on the task, and would either win double their wagered fund or lose the wagered fund depending on their performance in the task. The housemates were required to work as a group to complete the task, with the format of the tasks varying based on the number of remaining housemates. Should the housemates run out of the food provided for them, an emergency ration was available to them. The housemates were forbidden from discussing nominations, and doing so could result in punishment. The format of the series was mainly seen as a social experiment, and required housemates to interact with others who may have differing ideals, beliefs, and prejudices. Housemates were also required to make visits to the Diary Room during their stay in the House, where they were able to share their thoughts and feelings on their fellow housemates and the game. While in the House, the housemates are free to leave at any time, however, will not be allowed to return to the House. Similarly, a housemate can be removed from the House by production should they repeatedly break the rules set for the housemates. Should a housemate choose to leave the House or be ejected, a replacement housemate will enter the House sometime after their departure. Upon entering the House, new housemates are exempt from the first round of nominations they are present for.

== Housemates ==
Name	Age on entry	Hometown	Day entered	Day exited	Result
Brian Dowling	22	Rathangan	1	64	Winner
Helen Adams	22	Cwmbran, South Wales	1	64	Runner-up
Dean O'Loughlin	37	Birmingham	1	64	3rd place
Elizabeth Woodcock	26	Cumbria	1	63	Evicted
Paul Clarke	25	Reading	1	57	Evicted
Josh Rafter	32	London	16	50	Evicted
Amma Antwi-Agyei	23	London	1	43	Evicted
Paul "Bubble" Ferguson	24	Surrey	1	36	Evicted
Narinder Kaur	28	Leicester	1	29	Evicted
Stuart Hosking	36	Oxfordshire	1	22	Evicted
Penny Ellis	33	London	1	15	Evicted

== Nominations table ==
	Week 2	Week 3	Week 4	Week 5	Week 6	Week 7	Week 8	Week 9 Final		Nominations received
Brian	Helen, Elizabeth	Stuart, Helen	Paul, Amma	Paul, Amma	Paul, Amma	Paul, Josh	Paul, Helen	Winner (Day 64)		8
Helen	Bubble, Narinder	Narinder, Bubble	Brian, Narinder	Bubble, Brian	Josh, Dean	Dean, Josh	Dean, Elizabeth	Runner-up (Day 64)		16
Dean	Narinder, Penny	Narinder, Paul	Paul, Narinder	Paul, Helen	Paul, Amma	Helen, Josh	Paul, Helen	Third Place (Day 64)		4
Elizabeth	Penny, Helen	Paul, Stuart	Narinder, Paul	Paul, Brian	Paul, Helen	Paul, Helen	Paul, Helen	Evicted (Day 63)		4
Paul	Amma, Helen	Amma, Bubble	Brian, Bubble	Amma, Bubble	Amma, Elizabeth	Brian, Josh	Brian, Elizabeth	Evicted (Day 57)		25
Josh	Not in House	Exempt	Narinder, Bubble	Paul, Bubble	Amma, Brian	Brian, Helen	Evicted (Day 50)			8
Amma	Paul, Penny	Paul, Stuart	Narinder, Paul	Paul, Dean	Paul, Josh	Evicted (Day 43)				12
Bubble	Paul, Penny	Paul, Helen	Narinder, Josh	Paul, Josh	Evicted (Day 36)					10
Narinder	Helen, Bubble	Stuart, Helen	Amma, Bubble	Evicted (Day 29)						12
Stuart	Penny, Narinder	Amma, Narinder	Evicted (Day 22)							4
Penny	Helen, Amma	Evicted (Day 15)								5
Notes	1	2	none					3		
Against public vote	Helen, Penny	Paul, Stuart	Narinder, Paul	Bubble, Paul	Amma, Paul	Helen, Josh	Helen, Paul	Brian, Dean, Elizabeth, Helen		
Evicted	Penny; 58% to evict	Stuart; 86% to evict	Narinder; 62% to evict	Bubble; 53% to evict	Amma; 64% to evict	Josh; 84% to evict	Paul; 84% to evict	Elizabeth; 2% (out of 4)	Dean; 5% (out of 3)	
Evicted	Penny; 58% to evict	Stuart; 86% to evict	Narinder; 62% to evict	Bubble; 53% to evict	Amma; 64% to evict	Josh; 84% to evict	Paul; 84% to evict	Helen; 39% (out of 2)	Brian; 61% to win	

Notes

- ^Note 1: On Day 8, housemates were required to make their nominations during a live broadcast.
- ^Note 2: As a new housemate, Josh could not nominate and could not be nominated by his fellow housemates.
- ^Note 3: There were no nominations in the final week as the public were voting for who they wanted to win rather than to evict. On Day 63, the voting lines were frozen, and a vote count was made. The housemate with the fewest votes to win, Elizabeth, was evicted. The voting lines for the remaining three housemates then re-opened, and were closed for good during the final on Day 64.

== Weekly summary ==
Week 1	Entrances	On Day 1, Bubble, Amma, Helen, Narinder, Stuart, Dean, Brian, Penny, Paul and Elizabeth entered the house.
Week 1	Twists	Upon entering the house, the housemates found a dummy with a note in the den, stating that an eleventh housemate would enter the house shortly after the first eviction. The public then learned that they could vote for either Anne, Josh or Natasha to enter the game.
Week 1	Tasks	On Day 2, the housemates were given their first weekly task, in which they were required to build a fire in the backyard by noon. They then had to keep it lit for a consecutive 120 hours (5 days). The fire had to be watched by two or more housemates at all times. The housemates wagered 30% of their weekly shopping budget on the task. The housemates failed their shopping task.; On Day 6, Helen celebrated her 23rd birthday. She was given a choice of two presents: a Gucci handbag, or a party for the house. She chose to take the party for the house, which they had later that night.
Week 2	Twists	On Day 8, it was revealed that the public had chosen Josh to enter the game. He would remain cut off from the outside world until he entered the game.
Week 2	Tasks	On Day 9, the housemates were given their next weekly shopping task, in which they had to learn first-aid. The housemates had to treat injured "people" on the assessment day. The housemates wagered 60% of their weekly shopping budget on the task. The housemates passed their shopping task.
Week 2	Nominations	On Day 8, the housemates nominated for the first time. Helen and Penny received the most nominations and faced the public vote.
Week 2	Exits	On Day 15, Penny was evicted from the house, receiving 58% of the public vote.
Week 3	Entrances	On Day 16, Josh entered the house through the diary room.
Week 3	Tasks	On Day 17, the housemates were given their next weekly shopping task, in which they all had to learn ten facts about their fellow housemates. The housemates wagered 40% of their weekly shopping budget on the task. The housemates passed their shopping task.
Week 3	Nominations	On Day 18, the housemates nominated for the second time. As a new housemate, Josh was exempt from making nominations or being nominated this week. Stuart and Paul received the most nominations and faced the public vote.
Week 3	Exits	On Day 22, Stuart was evicted from the house, receiving 86% of the public vote to evict.
Week 4	Tasks	On Day 23, the housemates were given their next weekly shopping task, in which they had to adopt an individual dance and perform it on request from big brother at any time between 8:00 a.m. and 2:00 a.m. for 5 days. Each housemate would grab a partner when instructed, and would have 20 minutes to make it to the stage. Each housemate would pick a genre, and had to be outside for that genre. Each genre of music also had a specific dance move that the participants had to perform at least three times during the dance. The housemates wagered 10% of their weekly shopping budget on the task. The housemates failed their shopping task.; On Day 27, the housemates performed a task in which they had to design hats for one another. They later earned food and drinks for the task.
Week 4	Nominations	On Day 25, the housemates nominated for the third time. Narinder and Paul received the most nominations and faced the public vote.
Week 4	Exits	On Day 29, Narinder was evicted from the house, receiving 62% of the public vote to evict.
Week 5	Tasks	On Day 30, the housemates were given their next weekly shopping task in which they had to attempt to set a new Guinness World Record by the end of the week. There were four records in total that they could break. They would perform one task each day in attempt to break the record. The housemates would only pass the task if they broke one or more of the records. The housemates wagered 10% of their weekly shopping budget on the task. The housemates passed their shopping task.
Week 5	Nominations	On Day 32, The housemates nominated for the fourth time. Bubble and Paul received the most nominations and faced the public vote.
Week 5	Exits	On Day 36, Bubble was evicted from the house, receiving 53% of the public vote to evict.
Week 6	Tasks	On Day 37, the housemates were given their next weekly shopping task, in which a dog, named Paddy, would be released into the house for four hours every day. While Paddy was in the house, they were required to teach him tricks. The housemates randomly selected eight tricks. They were provided with a clicker and pieces of chicken to help train Paddy. The housemates wagered 50% of their weekly shopping budget on the task. The housemates failed their shopping task.; On Day 38, the housemates were given the task of making a soap opera based on their time in the house.; On Day 40, two intruders got into the backyard, causing a lockdown to be held. The intruders were immediately taken off the premises, and had no contact with the other housemates.
Week 6	Nominations	On Day 39, the housemates nominated for the fifth time. Amma and Paul received the most nominations and faced the public vote.
Week 6	Exits	On Day 43, Amma was evicted from the house, receiving 64% of the public vote to evict.
Week 7	Tasks	On Day 44, the housemates were given their next weekly shopping task, in which they had to dismantle a drum kit, move it over an obstacle course, and then reassemble it. They were required to complete this task in eight minutes and fifteen seconds, otherwise they would fail the task. The housemates wagered 36.4% of their weekly shopping budget on the task. The housemates passed their shopping task.
Week 7	Nominations	On Day 46, the housemates nominated for the sixth time. Helen and Josh received the most nominations and faced the public vote.
Week 7	Exits	On Day 50, Josh was evicted from the house, receiving 84% of the public vote to evict.
Week 8	Tasks	On Day 51, the housemates were given their last weekly shopping task, in which they had to play playground games. Games included skipping, riding a pogo stick, using a hula-hoop, and using a space hopper. Housemates had 6 minutes to complete the task. The housemates wagered 40% of their weekly shopping budget. The housemates failed their shopping task.
Week 8	Nominations	On Day 53, the housemates nominated for the seventh and final time this season. Helen and Paul received the most nominations and faced the public vote.
Week 8	Exits	On Day 57, Paul was evicted from the house, receiving 84% of the public vote to evict.
Week 9	Exits	On Day 63, in a surprise eviction, Elizabeth was evicted from the house, after only receiving 2% of the public vote to win.; On Day 64, Dean left the house in third place. It was then revealed that Brian was the winner, leaving Helen as the runner-up.

== Production ==
=== Development ===
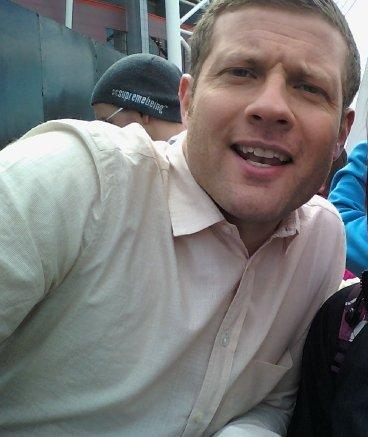
Dermot O'Leary presented the Big Brother's Little Brother spin-off.

Big Brother first began airing in the Netherlands, while editions in countries such as Germany proving to be hits with the public. Following the success of the show, it was confirmed that editions for the United States and the United Kingdom were in the works. Big Brother 1 (2000) proved to be a ratings success for Channel 4, leading to the announcement of a second series. Prior to Big Brother 2, a celebrity edition of the show aired on Channel 4. Rumors of a second series began in September 2000, when it was confirmed that Channel 5 and ITV were both interested in acquiring the series. Casting for Big Brother 2 began in late 2000. Candidates for the new series were able to apply by sending in a video audition. In December 2000, it was reported that more than 250,000 applications had been sent in; the first season received an estimated 40,000 applications. The live feed returned for this series, with a total of four feeds available on the Channel 4 site. The feed was cut for an estimated two hours nightly, and featured a delay for privacy reasons.

Davina McCall returned to present the series after presenting the previous series. The original ten housemates entered the house on 25 May 2001. Amongst the cast this series was Amma Antwi-Agyei, a stripper who wanted to "show Britain that not all strippers are the Jerry Springer stereotype." Housemate Elizabeth Woodcock was dating an older man prior to appearing on the series, while Dean O'Laughlin had been in a band that toured across the United States before being dropped by their record label. Brian Dowling was the first openly gay male to appear on the series, with Josh Rafter also being gay. This season featured a total of five women and six men.

The series launched on 25 May 2001 on Channel 4. There were a total of four highlight shows airing Monday through Thursday, with Friday being a live eviction episode presented by Davina McCall. Two episodes of the series aired on Friday. During the first episode, viewers were shown the highlights from the previous day and McCall revealed the housemate who had been evicted from the House. Two hours following this, the second episode of the night aired which saw the evicted housemate exit the House and participate in an interview with McCall. One of the highlight episodes per week featured a team of psychologists discussing the events of the previous week from their viewpoint. The series lasted for 64 days, concluding on 27 July 2001. There were a total of 55 episodes this series. This was the first season to feature the spin-off series Big Brother's Little Brother (2001–10), presented by Dermot O'Leary; Natalie Casey co-presented the series with O'Leary during the first week. Big Brother Reveals More (2001) aired solely during this series, and saw the major plot points of the past week being recapped.

The series was the first to be sponsored by BT Cellnet (who have, since 2002, been called O2) they remained sponsors until the fourth series in 2003.

=== House ===
For the first two series, the house was located in Bow, London near to the 3 Mills Studios. The second series had a bigger budget, and the house used was renovated for a new look. Despite a similar layout to the original house, the decorations and furniture were completely different. The new House had a "Cabin fever" theme, referring to the housemates' potential emotional reaction to being locked in a house for nine weeks. With this theme, there were wooden walls throughout the majority of the house. The living room was wider and more spacious this year. The kitchen remained simple, with only necessities such as an oven, fridge and sink. The "Diary Room", in which housemates may speak privately and reveal their true feelings to the public, had walls resembling the appearance of a garage door, with the Big Brother eye logo imprinted on it. Like the previous series, there was a men's and women's bedroom, each with five beds in them. One of the five in each room is larger than all of the others. Unlike the previous series, however, the rooms were not necessarily allocated to a specific gender. The outside of the house featured a chicken coop, with seven hens and one rooster. The housemates were to care for the chickens during their stay in the house, and must also use the eggs from the chickens to eat, lest they used part of their shopping budget to buy eggs. The house also featured a garden, which the housemates used to grow plants and vegetables to eat. The Housemates were later given a hot tub to use in the backyard, placed close to the garden. A new feature this year was the addition of the den outside, a small area in the backyard in which housemates could enter to lounge and speak to one another. There were no couches or seats, but there were various pillows scattered around.

== Ratings ==
Weekly ratings for each show on Channel 4. All numbers are in millions and provided by BARB.

Viewers (in millions)
	Week 1		Week 2	Week 3	Week 4	Week 5	Week 6	Week 7	Week 8	Week 9
Monday		3.52	2.91	4.43	4.38	4.66	4.88	3.87	5.03	5.02
Monday			4.35							
Tuesday		3.86	4.27	4.57	4.64	4.78	4.39	4.44	5.39	4.9
Wednesday		4.39	4.13	4.43	4.86	4.95	4.21	4.88	4.9	4.89
Thursday		3.93	3.56	4.44	4.46	4.77	4.25	5.19	5	4.19
Thursday										5.69
Friday	3.53	2.67	3.34	3.5	3.31	3.65	3.46	4.6	4.68	13.74
Friday	3.53	4.43	4.5	4.62	4.51	5.02	4.59	5.56	6.12	13.74
Weekly average	3.76		3.87	4.33	4.36	4.64	4.3	4.76	5.19	6.41
Running average	3.76		3.81	3.97	4.06	4.17	4.19	4.27	4.38	4.59
Series average	4.59									

== Controversy and criticism ==
In the fifth week, when Bubble was nominated against Paul for eviction, Bubble was evicted from the house. His eviction was seen as controversial, when it was uncovered that a phone number posted on the internet advertising news for rival football clubs had actually been falsely set-up, and would register voters to evict Bubble from the House. The vote to evict Bubble was only 53%, thus excluding the votes that were falsely cast, Bubble could have stayed in the game over Paul, who went on to receive fifth place in the series. In total, Bubble received 534,574 votes, while Paul received 470,059. This marked the second time in the series that the voting process had been tampered with, when last series a mass email was sent out that featured a link to evict Housemate Melanie, though it appeared to be a link to claim a free vacation.

Much like the previous series, this season had controversial moments due to outside interference. A few days before the first round of nominations, two fireworks were let off near the house, and the housemates were immediately sent inside for fear that it could be a secret message for a Housemate. In the fifth week of the game, two intruders broke into the house, and got into the hot tub. The remaining Housemates were put on lockdown, and security removed the intruders from the house immediately. The intrusion led to more security being put on the house. Some controversy also affected the Housemates personal lives. Penny, who was a teacher before entering the house, reportedly upset her boss, who felt her showering nude in the house "set a bad example for her pupils."
