= I Want to Hold You in My Dreams Tonight =

Single by Stella Parton

from the album I Want to Hold You in My Dreams Tonight
- A-side: "Ode to Olivia"
- Released: April 1975
- Genre: Country
- Length: 3:20
- Label: Country Soul
- Songwriters: Bob G. Dean; Stella Parton
- Producer: Bob Dean

Stella Parton singles chronology
| "I Want to Hold You in My Dreams Tonight" (1975) | "It's Not Funny Anymore" (1975) |

"I Want to Hold You in My Dreams Tonight" is a song co-written and originally recorded by American singer-songwriter, Stella Parton. Unable to sign with a major record label, Parton formed her own company to release the song as a single in 1975. It became her first and only top-10 hit on the US country songs chart and prompted the release of an album with the same title.

== Background, content and recording ==
The younger sibling of Dolly Parton, Stella Parton forged her own music career in the 1970s. Her first single and commercial success was "I Want to Hold You in My Dreams Tonight". The song was inspired by her son who was a young child at the time and Parton wrote it while touring in the 1970s. In an interview, Parton said she was more focused on writing truck-driving songs at the time in belief she would find success with them. However, after recording "I Want to Hold You in My Dreams" in the studio, fellow studio personnel told her they believed the song to be a hit if it was released as a single. "I Want to Hold You in My Dreams Tonight" was also credited to Bob G. Dean as Parton's co-writer and he is also credited as the song's producer.

== Release and critical reception ==
In an effort to get "I Want to Hold You in My Dreams Tonight" recorded, Parton shopped it to various country music record labels in Nashville but was rejected by all of them. Instead, she created her own recording company in an effort to get the single out to the public. "I Want to Hold You in My Dreams Tonight" was released as a single via Country Soul Records in April 1975 and was originally the B-side to the tune "Ode to Olivia". It eventually served as the title track to her second album of the same name. Cash Box gave it a positive response, calling it a "soft melodious ballad with lilting vocals" in May 1975.

== Sales and chart performance ==
By October 1975, Cash Box reported that the single had sold 150,000 units, which prompted Bob Dean to form her label into a larger label called Soul, Country and Blues Records. The B-side became the charting release, rising to the number nine position on the US Billboard Hot Country Songs chart in 1975. "I Want to Hold You in My Dreams Tonight" ultimately became Parton's first (and only) top-10 US country song in her career and the first of several charting singles through the late 1980s on Billboard.

== Track listing ==
- US 7" single
1. "Ode to Olivia" – 3:24
2. "I Want to Hold You in My Dreams Tonight" – 4:04
- Australia 7" single
1. "I Want to Hold You in My Dreams Tonight" – 4:04
2. "Ode to Olivia" – 3:24

== Charts ==
| Chart (1975) | Peak position |
|---|---|
| US Hot Country Songs (Billboard) | 9 |
