= Stella Parton =

American country singer (born 1949)

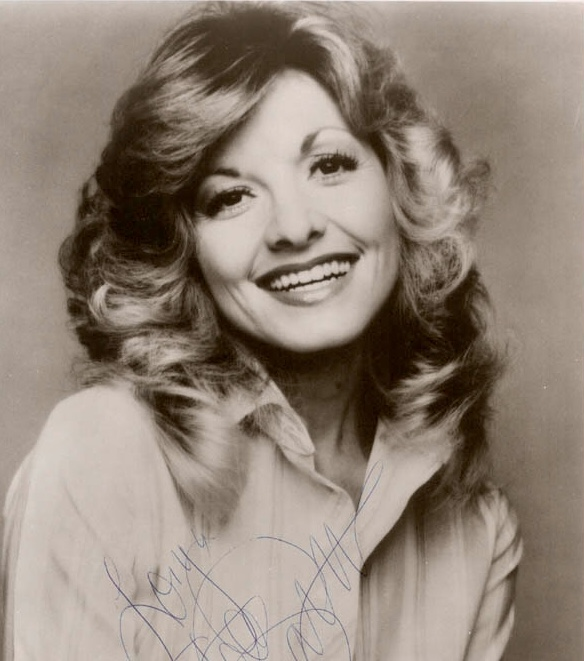
- Autographed photo of Stella Parton; late 1970s

Background information
- Born: Stella Mae Parton; May 4, 1949 (age 77); Sevierville, Tennessee, U.S.
- Genres: Country; gospel
- Occupations: Singer; songwriter
- Instrument: Vocals
- Years active: 1967–present
- Labels: Elektra; Soul, Country and Blues; Raptor
- Website: stellaparton.com

Stella Mae Parton (born May 4, 1949) is an American country singer and songwriter widely known for a series of country singles that charted during the mid-to-late-1970s, her biggest hit being "I Want to Hold You in My Dreams Tonight" in 1975. She is the younger sister of singer-songwriter Dolly Parton, the older sister of actress Rachel Parton George and Randy Parton, and the aunt of singer Heidi Parton.

== Early life ==
Stella Mae Parton was born on May 4, 1949 in Sevierville, Tennessee, and was one of 12 children born to Avie Lee and Robert Lee Parton. Her brothers and sisters included Dolly, Randy and Rachel. In the lineup, Stella was born near the middle of the siblings. Parton explained in her memoir that her parents were "self-reliant" due to their limited resources. The family lived in a four-room home in the foothills of Tennessee's Great Smoky Mountains with no running water or electricity. The home had coal oil lamps for light at night and her mother used a nearby stream to wash clothes. She and her siblings shared beds made of straw because her parents could not afford store-bought sheets and mattresses. An aunt helped provide clothes for the family, which came from donations from a Catholic church in Knoxville, Tennessee.

When Stella was seven, Dolly began her career and Stella saw very little of her. Around the same time, her eldest sister, Willadeene, left home after marrying. Because Stella was the eldest sister, she was directed to care for her younger siblings due to her mother's battles with mental health and her father's long periods away from home. "My parents had unhealthy patterns that the rest of us had to endure," she explained. At age ten, Parton herself fell ill after contracting hepatitis and was unable to be hospitalized because her family could not afford the medical bills. Instead, a missionary doctor treated her at home and she eventually made a full recovery.

In her childhood, Parton had aspirations of becoming a missionary and attending Lee Bible College in Tennessee. Instead, she married during her final year of high school, became a mother and enrolled in a cosmetology school in hopes of opening her own hair salon. Writing and singing songs had purely been a hobby for Parton up to this point but she was continually encouraged to become a country singer. She then agreed to working at a nightclub in Alexandria, Virginia and moved there with her husband and son.

== Recording career ==
In 1967, Parton released her first album, In the Garden (a gospel project with Willadeene, Cassie and their mother). Shortly thereafter, she moved to Washington, D.C., and began performing at the Hillbilly Heaven club. Later moving to Nashville, she started her own record label, Soul, Country and Blues, in 1975 and released her first solo album, I Want to Hold You in My Dreams Tonight. Its title track was a substantial national hit, climbing into the country top ten. Its success earned her a major-label deal with Elektra in 1976. Her 1977 duet with Carmol Taylor, "Neon Woman", was somewhat successful, and she had three top 20 hits over 1977–1978 with "The Danger of a Stranger" (also a top 40 hit in the UK), "Four Little Letters" and "Standard Lie Number One". She had an additional top-40 hit with her sister Dolly's composition, "Steady as the Rain", in 1979. She recorded three albums for Elektra up to 1979. In 1984, Stella performed a song with Kin Vassey for the soundtrack of the movie Rhinestone, in which Dolly starred.

Though her chart success tapered off after leaving Elektra in 1980, she continued to record, releasing albums for several independent labels, including Accord/Townhouse and Airborne. She is currently with Raptor Records. To date, she has released 22 albums and has had 28 charting singles. Parton has released a DVD, Live in Nashville, of footage from a 1990 concert in Nashville taken from the Attic Entertainment archives. It is the first of a planned Vintage Collection Series. In 2019, Parton released an album, Survivor. In addition to eight original songs, Survivor has a cover version of "Wake Me Up" by Avicii and Parton's interpretation of the Bob Seger classic, "Like a Rock".

== Television and film work ==
In 1970, Parton appeared on The Porter Wagoner Show. Parton performed George Hamilton IV's "Break My Mind" with sisters Dolly and Cassie. She performed "Cotton Fields" later in the show. In 1979, Parton starred in The Dukes of Hazzard episode titled "Deputy Dukes" as Mary Beth Malone, a woman who impersonates a police officer to settle a family score with a prisoner who ends up being transported by Bo (John Schneider) and Luke (Tom Wopat) during a change of venue.

During the 1980s and early 1990s, she starred in several Broadway touring musicals, including Seven Brides for Seven Brothers, Pump Boys & Dinettes, Best Little Whorehouse In Texas and Gentlemen Prefer Blondes. Parton also wrote and staged several Dollywood shows the opening season, as well as appearing on The Dukes of Hazzard (the first country artist to have a dramatic role on the series), Live with Regis and Kathie Lee, The Today Show and Good Morning America. She has been on several international radio programs, including Get Focused Radio with host Kate Hennessy.

Parton appeared with Gena Rowlands and Louis Gossett in the 2000 TV movie The Color of Love: Jacey's Story which was nominated for a Primetime Emmy award. In 2006, Parton made appearances in two films, A Dance for Bethany and Ghost Town, both scheduled for release in 2007. Each film also includes her music on the soundtrack. Also ready for release in 2007 was her 21st album, which is a collection of original contemporary Christian songs. Followed in 2008, was her 22nd album, Testimony. She played Corla Bass in Dolly Parton's Coat of Many Colors, an NBC made-for-TV movie based on Dolly's song of the same name that was first broadcast on NBC in December 2015.

In 2016, Parton appeared in Dolly Parton's Christmas of Many Colors: Circle of Love, reprising her role as Corla Bass. The NBC TV movie was nominated for a Primetime Emmy award for Outstanding Television Movie. In 2018, Parton took part in the BBC's Celebrity Masterchef series. Parton appeared as a mystery guest on To Tell the Truth hosted by Anthony Anderson in 2021, and none of the panelists guessed her as the real sibling of Dolly Parton., In 2022, Parton appeared in the Pure Flix film Nothing is Impossible, starring David A.R. White, which was filmed in Tennessee.

== Social work ==
She devotes much of her time to causes such as domestic violence and teaches at the New Opportunity School for Women at Berea College, Kentucky, using her knowledge of hair and make-up to help women build self-esteem. Parton is a national spokesperson for Mothers Against Drunk Driving and the Christian Appalachian Project and National Honorary Country Music Ambassador to the American Cancer Society. Parton went viral on Twitter in December 2020 with a tweet criticizing "old moldy politicians" over the COVID-19 vaccine rollout in the United States.

== Other ventures ==
Parton has a consulting business, Attic Entertainment Artist Development and Entertainment Consulting, which teaches stage presence, hair, make-up, wardrobe techniques and video coaching. She has also written three cookbooks, including State Fairs and Church Bazaars.

== Discography ==
- Stella (And the Gospel Carrolls) (1972)
- I Want to Hold You in My Dreams (1975)
- Country Sweet (1977)
- Stella Parton (1978)
- Love Ya (1979)
- True to Me (1980)
- So Far, So Good (1982)
- Always Tomorrow (1989)
- A Woman's Touch (1995)
- Appalachian Blues (2001)
- Blue Heart (2002)
- Appalachian Gospel (2003)
- Songwriter Sessions (2006)
- Holiday Magic (2008)
- Testimony (2008)
- American Coal (2010)
- Buried Treasure (2014)
- Last Train to Memphis (2015)
- Mountain Songbird (2016)
- Nashville Nights (2016)
- Old Time Singing (2017)
- Survivor (2018)

== Bibliography ==
- Parton, Stella (2011). Tell It Sister, Tell It. Attic Entertainment. ISBN 978-0615443140.
