= Big Brother (British TV series) series 15 =

Coordinates: 51°39′23″N 0°16′02″W

Big Brother
- Series 15
- Series fifteen logo
- Presented by: Emma Willis
- No. of days: 72
- No. of housemates: 19
- Winner: Helen Wood
- Runner-up: Ashleigh Coyle
- Companion shows: Big Brother's Bit on the Side
- No. of episodes: 72

Release
- Original network: Channel 5
- Original release: 5 June – 15 August 2014

Series chronology
- ← Previous; Series 14 Next → Series 16

Big Brother 2014, also known as Big Brother 15 and Big Brother: Power Trip, is the fifteenth series of the British reality television series Big Brother, hosted by Emma Willis and narrated by Marcus Bentley. It began on 5 June 2014 on Channel 5 and lasted for 72 days ending on 15 August 2014, making it the longest series to air on Channel 5. It was the fourth regular series and the tenth series of Big Brother overall to air on the channel. The series was officially confirmed on 3 April 2012 when Channel 5 renewed the show until 2014. It was therefore the final regular series to be included under the then contract.

The series was controversially won by Helen Wood who won the £100,000 prize fund beating bookies' favourite Ashleigh Coyle by a margin of 4,631 votes. Wood became the first woman to win the competition since the show's inception on Channel 5. It was then revealed that just 1.2% of the vote, separated Helen and Ashleigh, making it one of the closest results in Big Brother history. This was the first series of Big Brother UK where both the runner-up and the winner were women.

== Format ==
The fifteenth series of the show introduced several changes to the format, with the theme of the series being "Power Trip". This gives housemates who hold power influence over events in the house. An insider said, "This year Big Brother is offering housemates the ultimate prize... Power! Whoever has the power will be able to influence, twist and control events in the house like never before in Big Brother: Power Trip. Big Brother: Power Trip will initiate on launch night with Emma Willis and it will dominate the house for the summer. Housemates will have to be ruthless to seize power, keep it and impose their will on the rest of the house. The housemates aren't the only ones – viewers will also be given the power to manipulate housemates throughout the series."

== Housemates ==
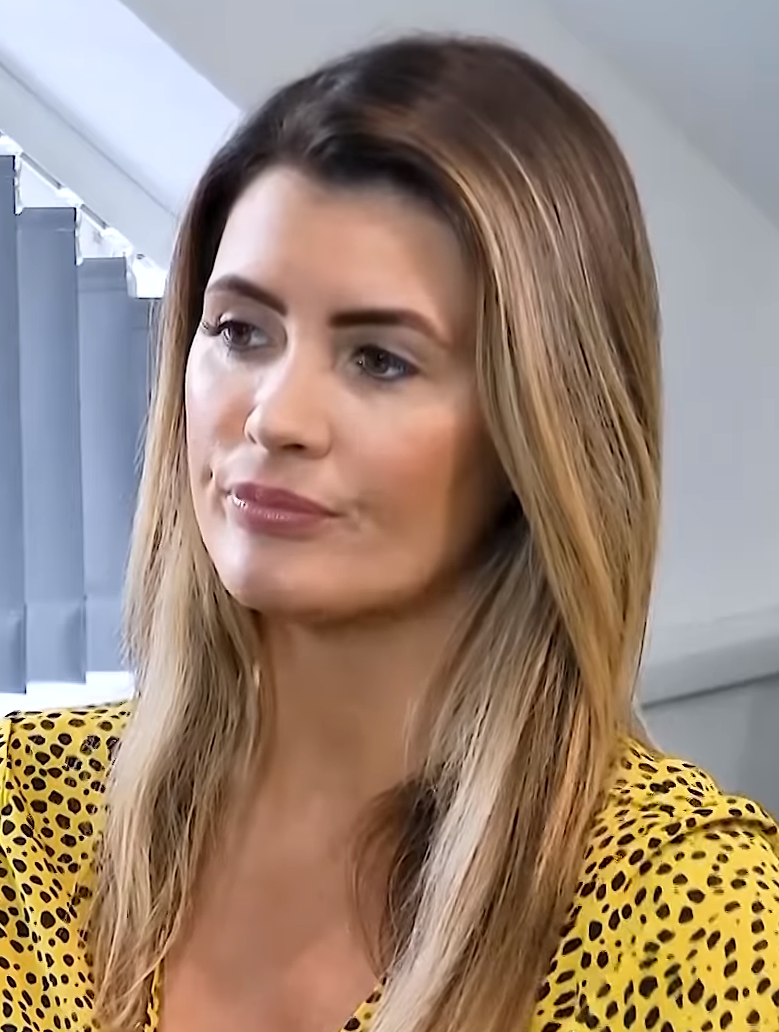
Helen Wood

On Day 1, 10 housemates entered the house, and a further 6 entered on Day 2. On Day 40, 3 new housemates entered. Overall, this brings the total housemates that have participated in this series to 19 (the most since the show moved to Channel 5).

Name	Age on entry	Hometown	Day entered	Day exited	Result
Helen Wood	27	Bolton	1	72	Winner
Ashleigh Coyle	18	Derry	2	72	Runner-up
Christopher Hall	23	Enniskillen	1	72	3rd place
Ash Harrison	26	Manchester	2	72	4th place
Christopher "Chris" Wright	33	New Forest	2	72	5th place
Pavandeep "Pav" Paul	22	Ilford	40	72	6th place
Winston Showan	27	Brentwood	1	65	Evicted
Mark Byron	24	Liverpool	1	65	Evicted
Zoe Birkett	29	Durham	40	58	Evicted
Steven Goode	23	Bushey	1	51	Evicted
Kimberly Kisselovich	23	London (originally from the United States)	1	45	Walked
Danielle McMahon	25	Glasgow	1	44	Evicted
Biannca Lake	31	Chigwell	40	44	Evicted
Marlon Wallen	22	Croydon	2	40	Evicted
Jale Karaturp	33	Surrey	2	37	Evicted
Matthew Davies	23	Hertfordshire	1	30	Evicted
Toya Washington	29	North London	2	23	Evicted
Pauline Bennett	49	Dudley	1	16	Evicted
Tamara Stewart-Wood	24	London	1	9	Evicted

Future Appearances

Helen Wood would later return the following year in Big Brother 16 as part of a secret twist that saw her and two other "legendary" former Housemates, Brian Belo and Nikki Grahame, re-enter the House as part of "Time Warp" week. In addition, Mark Byron and Matthew Davies also made an appearance in a shopping task.

== Power Housemate ==
The Power Housemate is responsible for making important decisions in the house regarding nominations. The Power Housemate is immune from being nominated for the week they hold the title, but they can still nominate others.

- On Day 1, Pauline was voted as the Power Housemate by the public just moments after entering the house. Her first big decision was to decide which housemate should be punished, and which should be rewarded based on first impressions. Respectively, she punished Matthew and rewarded Mark. Her next big decision came on Day 2 where she had to decide which of her housemates should be rewarded a pass to the final. She chose Helen. Pauline's final Power Housemate decision came on Day 4 where she was told to give someone a Killer Nomination. This meant that whoever received this would face eviction every week they remain in the house. She chose Jale. Pauline's reign of Power Housemate ended after the reveal of the Killer Nomination on Day 4.
- On Day 8, the public voted Chris as the next Power Housemate however his identity remained a secret to the remaining housemates. Instead, over the days he was Power Housemate he had to decide five housemates to nominate. His first and second nomination came on Day 9 after the first eviction where he chose Pauline and Christopher. His third nomination was Steven on Day 10, followed by Ash on Day 11. Chris' final nomination was Marlon on Day 12, and his Power Housemate status was never revealed to the house.
- On Day 15, the housemates voted for who they wanted to become their next Power Housemate. As Ash, Christopher, Jale, Marlon, Pauline and Steven were nominated, they could not be chosen. The housemates chose Toya and the results were revealed to the house on Day 16 after the eviction. Toya's first decision was to choose someone else to be Power Housemate with her and be part of the Power Couple. She chose Matthew. They then had to decide as a pair who would definitely face the next eviction. They chose Christopher. On Day 17, they were told they could veto three housemates' nominations. They chose Ash, Marlon and Steven and unknowingly saved Kimberly from eviction. However a further twist took place on Day 18 as Matthew and Toya were asked to save a nominated housemate from eviction. After choosing Steven, he was then asked to choose one of Power Couple Matthew and Toya to be his replacement. He chose Toya, meaning she would face eviction.
- On Day 23, it was announced that the girls – Ashleigh, Danielle, Helen, Jale and Kimberly – would become Girl Power and that all of the boys would face eviction. Despite Jale being the holder of the Killer Nomination, she was immune from eviction this week along with the other girls. On Day 26, the girls chose to save Chris, Marlon and Steven from eviction.
- On Day 40, the three new housemates – Biannca, Pav and Zoe – were told that they would have the power to choose one original housemate to be evicted. This power had to remain secret from the other housemates. However, unbeknownst to them, they also faced eviction as the public were voting for who they wanted to stay. Biannca received the fewest votes so was evicted on Day 44 leaving the eviction decision down to Pav and Zoe. They chose to evict Danielle.
- On Day 46, the public selected Ashleigh as the next Power Housemate via a poll on the Big Brother app. The identity of Ashleigh as the Power Housemate was kept a secret from the other housemates. On Day 47, Ashleigh chose Chris to join her as Power Housemate, forming the Power Alliance. Ashleigh and Chris then nominated Steven before selecting Mark to join the Power Alliance. Later that day, the Power Alliance nominated Ash. On Day 48, the Power Alliance were allowed 60 seconds to speak to each of former housemates Biannca, Danielle and Matthew to receive advice on their next nominations. Following this, the Power Alliance nominated Pav and Zoe and their Power Trip ended. However, in a shock twist, Big Brother then revealed the Power Alliance to the house and gave nominated housemates the opportunity to save one of themselves from eviction and swap with a Power Alliance member. Ash was saved and replaced with Ashleigh.
- On Day 51, the power was given to the public as People Power. Their first decision was to decide which housemate should be immune from the next eviction by voting in a poll via the Big Brother app. The public chose Ashleigh. The next decision was which housemate should be in control of who gets their letters from home. This housemate was Winston. The public also played a role in this week's shopping task; 'Housemates vs the Internet'. Via the Big Brother app, the public had to choose which housemate was "most..." in a series of categories. Housemates then had to correctly identify who had received the most and fewest votes. On Day 57, housemates watched a focus group where members of the public gave their honest opinions on the housemates.
- On Day 58, it was revealed that housemates would be given the opportunity to increase the prize fund by £25,000 to a total of £125,000 in the Power of Money twist. This was revealed to the housemates on Day 61 immediately after face-to-face nominations. On Day 62, the first opportunity to add to the prize fund will take place as the remaining housemates eligible to face eviction will each choose an envelope, one containing £1,000, another containing £5,000 and the final containing £10,000. The already nominated housemate then chose one of the remaining housemates to join them in facing eviction, with the amount in their envelope being added to the overall prize fund. Chris was chosen, with £10,000 being added to the fund. Ash and Winston were also given the chance to add £1,000 to the prize fund each by entering Helen's Salon. After making mistakes whilst cutting Christopher and Mark's hair in the past, Helen will be given the opportunity to cut Ash and Winston's in the same way if they choose to accept. They refused, therefore no more money was added. The next chance to add to the prize fund was given to the housemates that did not receive their letters from home; Chris, Christopher and Mark as they were to be told they can spend time with one of their family members. Before spending time with them, they were given £6,000 towards the fund, but were told for every second they spend with their loved ones, the money will go down by £20. All three drained the money therefore no more was added to the fund. A further £500 was added to the fund after some housemates drank a stinky tofu cocktail. On Day 63, Mark missed out on £1,500 after he failed his psychic powers task, predicting the wrong bowl a meerkat would eat out of. However, the housemates then banked a further £5,000 by unlocking a vault by identifying what housemates said about them from the quotes read out to them. The public then voted for who they thought was the best judge of character. They chose Ashleigh. For the last part of the Power of Money twist, all housemates except Ashleigh were told they had been selected by the public to face a dilemma: take the banked £15,500 for themselves, or leave it for the winner. However this was a lie, but Ash, Chris and Mark all said they would take the money. Ashleigh's role in the task was then revealed as she had to predict the three housemates who said they would take it. As she failed the predict all three, she failed the task and lost the extra money meaning the prize fund stayed at £100,000.
- On Day 68, in the Power of Knowledge, the Power returned for the final time, this time to Ash and Christopher. These were selected by Big Brother as they are the only housemates who have not been Power Housemate before. Their first mission was to choose two questions for Big Brother to ask the other housemates in the Diary Room. Following Helen's "surprise eviction" on Day 69, Ash and Christopher were then given the power to evict one more housemate. They chose Chris. However, unbeknownst to them and the other housemates, Chris and Helen had not really been evicted and were actually living in Big Brother's Spare Room. In the Spare Room they were able to watch the other housemates' every move. Chris and Helen returned to the house on Day 69.

Colour key
Won the title of Power Housemate
Eligible to become Power Housemate
Not in the house at the time when the Power Housemate was decided
Was not eligible to become Power Housemate

Housemate	Day 1–4	Day 8–12	Day 16–18		Day 23–26	Day 40–44	Day 46–48	Day 51–58	Day 61–63	Day 68–69
Housemate	Public vote	Public vote	Voted for	Votes received	Girl Power	Armageddon	Power Alliance	People Power	Power of Money	Power of Knowledge
Housemate	Public vote	Public vote	Power Couple		Girl Power	Armageddon	Power Alliance	People Power	Power of Money	Power of Knowledge
Helen			Toya	1						
Ashleigh			Toya	1						
Christopher			Matthew	–						
Ash			Helen	–						
Chris			Danielle	1						
Pav										
Winston			Matthew	1						
Mark			Toya	1						
Zoe										
Steven			Kimberly	–						
Kimberly			Mark	3						
Danielle			Ashleigh	1						
Biannca										
Marlon			Winston	–						
Jale			Kimberly	–						
Matthew			Kimberly	2						
Toya			Chris	4						
Pauline	49.3%		Toya	–						
Tamara										

== Nominations table ==
	Week 1	Week 2	Week 3	Week 4	Week 5	Week 6		Week 7	Week 8	Week 9	Week 10 Final		Nominations received
	Week 1	Week 2	Week 3	Week 4	Week 5	Day 39	Day 44	Week 7	Week 8	Week 9	Week 10 Final		Nominations received
Helen	Jale, Ashleigh	Not eligible	Danielle, Chris	Power; Housemate	Ashleigh, Christopher	Marlon, Ashleigh	Not eligible	Not eligible	Pav, Zoe	Pav, Christopher	Winner (Day 72)		N/A
Ashleigh	Tamara, Winston	Not eligible	Ash, Winston	Power; Housemate	Ash, Kimberly	Ash, Kimberly	Not eligible	Steven, ~~Ash~~, Pav, Zoe	Pav, Zoe	Pav, Christopher	Runner-up (Day 72)		12
Christopher	Danielle, Matthew	Not eligible	Chris, Marlon	No nominations	Steven, Winston	Marlon, Ash	Not eligible	Not eligible	Zoe, Pav	Winston, Pav	Third place (Day 72)		12
Ash	Danielle, Ashleigh	Not eligible	~~Chris,~~; ~~Danielle~~	No nominations	Ashleigh, Danielle	Ashleigh, Danielle	Not eligible	Not eligible	Pav, Christopher	Christopher, Pav	Fourth place (Day 72)		12
Chris	Tamara, Winston	Pauline, Christopher, Steven, Ash, Marlon	Steven, Winston	No nominations	Marlon, Steven	Steven, Marlon	Not eligible	Steven, ~~Ash~~, Pav, Zoe	Pav, Zoe	Pav, Mark	Fifth place (Day 72)		14
Pav	Not in House						Danielle	Not eligible	Ash, Chris	Winston, Mark	Sixth place (Day 72)		15
Winston	Marlon, Danielle	Not eligible	Danielle, Kimberly	No nominations	Chris, Ashleigh	Marlon, Danielle	Not eligible	Not eligible	Pav, Zoe	Christopher, Pav	Evicted (Day 65)		8
Mark	Kimberly, Jale	Not eligible	Chris, Danielle	No nominations	Kimberly, Marlon	Marlon, Kimberly	Not eligible	~~Ash~~, Pav, Zoe	Pav, Chris	Pav, Chris	Evicted (Day 65)		4
Zoe	Not in House						Danielle	Not eligible	Chris, Christopher	Evicted (Day 58)			6
Steven	Jale, Chris	Not eligible	~~Chris,~~; ~~Danielle~~	No nominations	Ashleigh, Chris	Marlon, Ashleigh	Not eligible	Not eligible	Evicted (Day 51)				9
Kimberly	Tamara, Ash	Not eligible	Chris, Marlon	Power; Housemate	Ashleigh, Danielle	Marlon, Ashleigh	Not eligible	Walked (Day 45)					7
Danielle	Matthew, Steven	Not eligible	Chris, Ash	Power; Housemate	Christopher, Marlon	Ash, Chris	Not eligible	Evicted (Day 44)					11
Biannca	Not in House						Power; Housemate	Evicted (Day 44)					N/A
Marlon	Toya, Mark	Not eligible	~~Ashleigh,~~; ~~Kimberly~~	No nominations	Ashleigh, Christopher	Mark, Winston	Evicted (Day 40)						15
Jale	Steven, Tamara	Not eligible	Steven, Ash	Power; Housemate	Chris, Ash	Evicted (Day 37)							6
Matthew	Danielle, Jale	Not eligible	Christopher	No nominations	Evicted (Day 30)								2
Toya	Marlon, Christopher	Not eligible	Christopher	Evicted (Day 23)									1
Pauline	Jale	Not eligible	Evicted (Day 16)										1
Tamara	Jale, Kimberly	Evicted (Day 9)											4
Notes	1, 2	1, 2, 3	1, 2, 4	1, 5	2, 6	2, 7	1, 2, 8, 9	1, 2, 10	2, 11	2, 12	13		
Against house vote	none					Ash, Ashleigh, Marlon	Ash, Ashleigh, Chris, Christopher, Danielle, Mark, Steven, Winston	none					
Against public vote	Danielle, Jale, Tamara	Ash, Christopher, Jale, Marlon, Pauline, Steven	Ash, Chris, Christopher, Danielle, Jale, Marlon, Toya, Winston	Ash, Christopher, Mark, Matthew, Winston	Ashleigh, Chris, Christopher, Jale	none	Biannca, Pav, Zoe	Ashleigh, Pav, Steven, Zoe	Chris, Pav, Zoe	Chris, Christopher, Mark, Pav, Winston	Ash, Ashleigh, Chris, Christopher, Helen, Pav		
Walked	none							Kimberly	none				
Evicted	Tamara; Most votes to evict	Pauline; 79.4% (out of 4) to evict	Toya; Most votes (out of 5) to evict	Matthew; Most votes (out of 3) to evict	Jale; Most votes (out of 2) to evict	Marlon; 7 of 10 nominations	Biannca; Fewest votes to save	Steven; Most votes (out of 3) to evict	Zoe; Most votes to evict	Mark; Most votes to evict	Pav; Fewest votes (out of 6)	Christopher; Fewest votes (out of 3)	
Evicted	Tamara; Most votes to evict	Pauline; 79.4% (out of 4) to evict	Toya; Most votes (out of 5) to evict	Matthew; Most votes (out of 3) to evict	Jale; Most votes (out of 2) to evict	Marlon; 7 of 10 nominations	Biannca; Fewest votes to save	Steven; Most votes (out of 3) to evict	Zoe; Most votes to evict	Mark; Most votes to evict	Chris; Fewest votes (out of 6)	Christopher; Fewest votes (out of 3)	
Evicted	Tamara; Most votes to evict	Pauline; 79.4% (out of 4) to evict	Toya; Most votes (out of 5) to evict	Matthew; Most votes (out of 3) to evict	Jale; Most votes (out of 2) to evict	Marlon; 7 of 10 nominations	Biannca; Fewest votes to save	Steven; Most votes (out of 3) to evict	Zoe; Most votes to evict	Mark; Most votes to evict	Chris; Fewest votes (out of 6)	Ashleigh; 49.4% (out of 2)	
Evicted	Tamara; Most votes to evict	Pauline; 79.4% (out of 4) to evict	Toya; Most votes (out of 5) to evict	Matthew; Most votes (out of 3) to evict	Jale; Most votes (out of 2) to evict	Marlon; 7 of 10 nominations	Danielle; Pav & Zoe's choice to evict	Steven; Most votes (out of 3) to evict	Zoe; Most votes to evict	Winston; Most votes to evict	Ash; Fewest votes (out of 4)	Ashleigh; 49.4% (out of 2)	
Evicted	Tamara; Most votes to evict	Pauline; 79.4% (out of 4) to evict	Toya; Most votes (out of 5) to evict	Matthew; Most votes (out of 3) to evict	Jale; Most votes (out of 2) to evict	Marlon; 7 of 10 nominations	Danielle; Pav & Zoe's choice to evict	Steven; Most votes (out of 3) to evict	Zoe; Most votes to evict	Winston; Most votes to evict	Helen; 50.6% to win		

Notes

- ^Note 1: This housemate was the current Power Housemate and could not be nominated for eviction through the standard nomination process that week. Despite not being able to be nominated, in some cases, Power Housemates could face the public vote and be evicted, see note 4 & note 8.
- ^Note 2: On Day 2, Power Housemate Pauline granted Helen a pass to the final, granting her immunity from every eviction of the series and therefore could not be nominated by her fellow housemates. On Day 4, as housemates nominated for the first time, Pauline was told she'd make one Killer Nomination and that whoever she chose would automatically face every eviction of the series until they were evicted. Pauline decided to give the Killer Nomination to Jale, meaning she also could not be nominated by her fellow housemates in following weeks.
- ^Note 3: On Day 9, Big Brother announced that this week's nominations were cancelled and only the secret Power Housemate, Chris, was eligible to nominate. Chris nominated Pauline and Christopher on Day 9, Steven on Day 10, Ash on Day 11, and Marlon on Day 12. On Day 15, Big Brother announced that Housemates would be choosing the next Power Housemate. All Housemates were eligible to receive the power except for those who were currently facing the public vote.
- ^Note 4: Toya was voted the Power Housemate by the group on Day 16, and she chose Matthew to join her in forming the Power Couple. Together they picked Christopher to automatically face the third eviction. All other housemates later nominated as normal, but before they did, Toya and Matthew had the chance to cancel three housemates’ nominations. They chose Ash, Marlon and Steven. Had this not happened Kimberly would have also faced the public vote. On Day 18, Toya and Matthew were able to save one of the nominees (excluding Christopher and Jale). They chose Steven, who in return had to put either Toya or Matthew up for eviction. He chose Toya.
- ^Note 5: After Toya's eviction, Big Brother announced Girl Power, with the female housemates getting control of the house and immunity for the week. As a result of this, Jale was given a one-week reprieve from her Killer Nomination and all male housemates were automatically put up for eviction. Before the lines opened, the girls were allowed to save three of the boys. They saved Chris, Marlon and Steven.
- ^Note 6: Marlon was originally nominated alongside Ashleigh, Chris, Christopher and Jale, however he won safety in the Battery Power shopping task meaning he no longer faced eviction.
- ^Note 7: On Day 39, housemates nominated as normal, unaware that as part of "Armageddon Week" the housemate who received the most nominations would be instantly evicted the next day. Marlon received the most nominations (7 out of a possible 10 nominations) and was therefore evicted.
- ^Note 8: Unbeknownst to them, new housemates Biannca, Pav and Zoe all faced the public vote this week. Unlike previous weeks, this week was a vote to save.
- ^Note 9: After Marlon's eviction, Big Brother told the rest of the housemates that they all faced the public vote this week. In reality, Big Brother handed the power to the new housemates, who had to decide whom to evict. As Helen had a free pass to the final, she could not be chosen. Kimberly also could not be chosen as she temporarily left the house on Day 44 due to an illness. Following Biannca's eviction, Pav and Zoe had 30 seconds to decide who to evict, and they unanimously decided to evict Danielle.
- ^Note 10: On Day 46, Ashleigh was chosen by the public to become the next Power Housemate. On Day 47, she chose Chris to join her in forming a Power Alliance. Together they decided to nominate Steven and selected Mark to join the Alliance, which then nominated Ash. On Day 48, the Power Alliance nominated Pav and Zoe. In a further twist, the nominated housemates were told to decide between them which of them should be saved from eviction and which of the Power Alliance to replace themselves with. The nominated housemates decided to save Ash from eviction and replaced him with Ashleigh.
- ^Note 11: On Day 51, the power was given to the public. Via the Big Brother app, the public voted for Ashleigh to be immune from eviction this week and therefore, she could not be nominated.
- ^Note 12: On Day 61, housemates nominated face-to-face. On Day 62, as part of Big Brother's "Power of Money" scheme, the remaining housemates eligible to face the public vote (Ash, Ashleigh and Chris) each chose an envelope: one containing £1,000, another containing £5,000, and the final containing £10,000. The already nominated housemates had to choose one of the remaining housemates to join them in facing eviction, with the amount in their envelope supposedly added to the prize fund. They chose Chris, and £10,000 was added to the fund (although all the money won in the Power of Money was not put in the prize fund as Ashleigh failed a task).
- ^Note 13: This week the public voted to win, rather than to evict. Whilst the public were voting to win, Helen and Chris were fake evicted on Day 68 and moved into the 'Spare Room', but they were still eligible to win. They returned to the house the following day.

== Weekly summary ==
The main events in the Big Brother 15 house are summarised in the table below. A typical week began with nominations, followed by the shopping task, and then the eviction of a housemate during the live Friday episode. Evictions, tasks, and other events for a particular week are noted in order of sequence.

Week 1	Tasks	On Day 3, housemates participated in the 'Crack the Category' task in order to win luxury ingredients for dinner that night. Power Housemate Pauline chose Christopher as 'most perceptive' Housemate and together they sat in the Diary Room while the other Housemates ranked themselves from most to least in various different categories such as fake, manipulative or obnoxious. Pauline and Christopher then had to guess from three choices what category the Housemates were ranking on. Pauline and Christopher correctly guessed four out of six categories, and therefore, passed the task.; On Day 4, the housemates without their suitcases had a chance to win them back by competing in a task. Chris and Ashleigh went head-to-head to see who was the most weird, Jale and Kimberly had to settle who was the most sexy, whilst Tamara and Toya, Ash and Marlon attempted to be most disgusting. The remaining housemates voted as to which housemate was best in the categories and chose Chris, Jale, Tamara and Toya to receive their suitcases.; On Days 6 and 7, housemates took part in their first shopping task of the series, entitled 'Power of Positivity'. Over these two days, housemates had to remain positive throughout the entire challenge, with any display of negativity incurring a fail. To make things more difficult, Big Brother set up mini-challenges (such as drinking disgusting 'cocktail' drinks) and banned certain products (such as cigarettes and beauty products) to make the task more difficult to complete. Housemates incurred 5 out of a maximum 10 fails, and therefore passed the task.; On Day 9, after claiming he was psychic, Mark's claims were put to the test as he had to predict the future in the house and answer questions from three housemates; Helen, Danielle and Winston.
Week 1	Twists	On Day 1, after the housemates entered, Pauline was voted as the Power Housemate by the public. She then had to enter the Control Room to make a decision. She was shown all the housemate's VTs and based on her impressions she had to reward a housemate and punish one. She chose to reward Mark and punish Matthew. As a result, Mark was given £5,000 and Matthew spent the first night in a box above the garden.; On Day 2, after the final six housemates entered, Pauline had to decide which housemate would win a free pass to the Final, granting them immunity from every single eviction. She chose Helen.; On Day 4, during nominations, Pauline was given a special Killer Nomination to give to any one housemate. The person who she used her Killer Nomination on will be automatically nominated for eviction every single week until they exit the house. She chose Jale. It was then announced that Pauline's Power Trip was over, and that the next Power Housemate will remain secret to the other housemates.
Week 1	Punishments	On Day 1, as part of the launch night twist, Pauline decided that Matthew should be punished. He spent the night in a box above the garden.
Week 1	Entrances	On Day 1, Tamara, Mark, Helen, Steven, Danielle, Winston, Matthew, Kimberly, Christopher and Pauline entered the house.; On Day 2, Toya, Chris, Ashleigh, Marlon, Ash, and Jale entered the house.
Week 1	Exits	On Day 4, Housemates nominated for the first time, and on Day 5, it was revealed that Danielle, Jale, and Tamara had received the most nominations from their fellow Housemates and were up for eviction. Housemates then learned that Power Housemate Pauline used her Killer Nomination on Jale. Because Jale received this nomination, it was revealed that she would face eviction every week that she remained in the House.; On Day 9, Tamara became the first housemate to be evicted.
Week 2	Tasks	On Day 10, Steven, Marlon and Ash were told that they'd be giving a lesson in how to flirt and would have to use these on the other housemates. However, the lesson was completely fake and all of the other housemates had to convince them that their flirting techniques worked. As housemates passed the task by successfully convincing the boys, Big Brother rewarded them with a romantic date.; On Day 12, the housemates began their second shopping task, in which the house was turned into a farm. The farmers (Christopher, Jale and Marlon) had to motivate the "cows" (Ashleigh, Chris, Toya and Winston), the "pigs" (Helen, Kimberly, Pauline and Steven) and the "chickens" (Ash, Danielle, Mark and Matthew) to make food to sell to Big Brother. The more food they sold, the more money they earned. If the money they earned exceeded the target, they would pass the task. The housemates passed the shopping task on Day 13.; On Day 16, the housemates were given a prison-themed task and the house was divided into guards and inmates. Mark and Pauline were the guards and forced the inmates to peel potatoes. However, this was not the real task and unbeknownst to Mark and Pauline, the inmates had to distract them whilst retrieving luxury items from the "evidence room".
Week 2	Twists	On Day 8, Chris was told that he had been voted as the next Power Housemate by the public.; On Day 9, Big Brother announced that this week's nominations were cancelled and only the Power Housemate would be allowed to nominate. That night, Power Housemate Chris secretly nominated Pauline for eviction. Followed by Christopher, Steven, Ash and Marlon until Day 12, where his Power Trip ended.
Week 2	Punishments	On Day 11, Marlon received a formal warning for making explicit remarks about Kimberly.; On Day 12, Helen received a caution over accusations that she was bullying Jale.
Week 2	Exits	On Day 9, Pauline and Christopher were nominated for eviction, and being the holder of the Killer Nomination, Jale was automatically nominated for eviction. On Day 10, Steven was nominated for eviction, Ash was nominated on Day 11 and on Day 12, Marlon was nominated for eviction.; Pauline left the house temporarily to visit a hospital after burning her hands whilst cooking.; On Day 16, Pauline became the second housemate to be evicted.
Week 3	Tasks	On Day 18, Matthew and Toya were told they could save one housemate from eviction. They watched the nominated housemates' VTs and spied on them in secret in the Pod.; On Day 19, Christopher, Danielle and Mark had to put their full trust in their fellow housemates, however this was fake. They were told that Ash, Ashleigh and Winston had to take part in a memory game where they had to remember particular numbers in order for the other to avoid a disgusting fate. Christopher, Mark and Danielle did not know that they are actually trying to fool them and whoever could string along their partner for the longest would win an award.; On Day 20, housemates began their third shopping task in which they had to think alike. Three housemates were asked into the "mind lab" at a time and were offered a task. If they all said Yes then they would earn 10 points and would have to complete the task, if they all said No then they'd earn 5 points but wouldn't take part in the task. However, if their answers did not match they would earn no points but the housemates that said Yes would still have to take part. The task continued on Day 21 and it was announced that they'd failed it.; On Day 22, Steven was given a secret mission. He was given made up words in which he had to throw into a conversation to describe his fellow housemates.
Week 3	Twists	On Day 16, it was revealed that Toya had become the new Power Housemate. Her first decision was to choose someone to join her. She chose Matthew and they became the Power Couple. They then had to choose someone to automatically nominate to face the public vote. They chose Christopher.; On Day 17, the housemates nominated. However Matthew and Toya were given the power to veto three housemates' nominations. They chose Ash, Marlon and Steven.; On Day 18, Matthew and Toya saved Steven from eviction. However, Steven was told he must choose one of the Power Couple to replace him. He chose Toya.
Week 3	Punishments	On Day 21, Helen received a formal warning for using threatening behaviour during an argument with Matthew.
Week 3	Exits	On Day 16, Christopher was nominated by the Power Couple, Matthew and Toya joining Jale who automatically faces eviction.; On Day 17, Ash, Chris, Danielle, Marlon, Steven and Winston were nominated by their fellow housemates, however Steven was saved on Day 18 and was replaced with Toya.; On Day 23, Toya became the third housemate to be evicted.
Week 4	Tasks	On Day 24, Ash, Marlon and Winston were asked to write a poem about one of the female housemates and present it to Danielle. She then showed them clips of their behaviour towards girls in the house and gave them ways to improve it.; On Day 25, the boys were asked to make cocktails for the girls which would represent their personality. Unbeknownst to them, the girls listened to their conversations whilst they were making the cocktails.; On Day 26, before the girls gave their verdict for who they wanted to save from eviction, the boys were asked to "Man Up" and give a speech as to why they think they should be saved.; On Day 27, housemates began their next shopping task where Ash, Jale and Steven became the secret assassins whilst Winston became the inspector. Their mission was to "kill off" their fellow housemates without Winston suspecting them. Between them they successfully killed off Christopher, Helen, Kimberly, Mark, Matthew and Marlon. When the housemates were killed off, they were sent to the morgue where they could secretly watch the other housemates. On Day 28, Winston correctly predicted the assassins therefore housemates passed the task, however Ash, Jale and Steven were told they'd live on basic rations.; On Day 29, Helen was given a secret mission to bring some humour to the house. After successfully telling jokes, sitting on a whoopee cushion and "accidentally" falling in the pool, she was rewarded with a clown costume and make-up.; On Day 30, Mark and Christopher were given the task of identifying childhood photos of their fellow housemates. If they were to guess the majority of the pictures, all housemates would receive pictures of family and friends, as well a hamper of sweets. The task was passed.
Week 4	Twists	On Day 23, shortly after Toya's eviction, Big Brother revealed that the female housemates had formed Girl Power for this week and were all holders of the power. Because of this, all the females were safe from this week's eviction and all of the males were automatically nominated to face the public vote.; On Day 26, the girls were able to save three of the male housemates from eviction. They chose Chris, Marlon, and Steven.
Week 4	Exits	On Day 23, it was revealed that all of the male housemates; Ash, Chris, Christopher, Mark, Marlon, Matthew, Steven and Winston would face the public vote.; On Day 26, Chris, Marlon and Steven were saved from eviction.; On Day 30, Matthew became the fourth housemate to be evicted.
Week 5	Tasks	On Day 31, Christopher became Father Christmas and each housemate was called to "Santa's grotto" (located in the diary room) where they had to give Christopher their wish list. He then had to choose who was on his nice list and who was on his naughty list. The 'nice' housemates were invited to a Christmas party with Christmas dinner, whereas the 'naughty' housemates weren't. Danielle, Helen and Marlon were put on Christopher's naughty list and were therefore not invited to the party.; On Day 33, housemates took part in their next shopping task where the house was powered on battery. Over the two days of the task, housemates were asked into the "app zone" where they were offered to use an app. If they used an app, the battery would drain. All housemates had to do was keep the battery above 0%. On Day 34, Big Brother offered the nominated housemates a chance to save themselves, but by doing this the battery would drain and the shopping task would be failed. Marlon chose to save himself therefore the housemates failed.; On Day 35, the housemates were matched with their "perfect partner" where they had to compete against the other couples to show which pair know each other best. Over a number of different rounds, couples were eliminated and the remaining couples were invited to a party.; On Day 36, Steven was given an earpiece and was asked to target a housemate for secret missions. However, he is unaware that Ashleigh also has an earpiece and must try and guess who Steven will target.; On Day 37, Helen, Mark and Winston were given 60-second-challenges to compete in. Helen had to get balls out of gunge using her mouth alone, Mark had to put pegs on his face, and Winston had to eat chillies. However, after completing these challenges, they were told they had each set their personal best and would have to take part again to beat this. As all three housemates were successful, they won a hamper of treats.
Week 5	Twists	On Day 34, Marlon saved himself from eviction.
Week 5	Exits	On Day 32, Ashleigh, Chris, Christopher and Marlon were nominated joining Killer Nominee Jale in facing eviction. However, on Day 34, Marlon saved himself from eviction.; On Day 37, Jale became the fifth housemate to be evicted.
Week 6: Armageddon Week	Tasks	On Day 38, the house was transformed into a post-apocalyptic wasteland for the beginning of Armageddon Week. In teams, housemates had to collect as many fish as possible from a sewage pipe and then had to scavenge for items in order to build a raft that could hold a housemate afloat for the longest time. Ashleigh's team (Ashleigh, Helen, Steven, Mark and Ash) won both tasks and were rewarded with a preview of the Dawn of the Planet of the Apes film.; On Day 40, housemates had to compete in a number of challenges to earn basic rations for the house.; On Day 41, original housemates competed against new housemates to win back their kettle and toaster (or luxury treats for the new housemates if they were to win). In 'On the Ledge', new housemates tried to knock original housemates off of a ledge by reducing the ledge's size through moving a wall. Original housemates had to remain on the ledge for the duration of the task. Later, in 'Fool the House', original housemates had to correctly identify whether statements (from newspaper stories, etc.) read by the new housemates were true or false. Original housemates won the task.; On Day 42, new housemates selected Christopher to act as a mole and via a hidden earpiece, Christopher had to ask original housemates questions set by the new housemates, who were watching and listening in the Luxury Pad. Original housemates did not discover Christopher was on a task, and new housemates and Christopher were rewarded with a meal in the garden. Later, in 'Judgement Time', original housemates had to correctly identify who new housemates had selected as the answers to a series of questions in VTs that were recorded before new housemates entered the house. Original housemates correctly identified the majority of the new hosuemates' answers and won back hot water and access to the bathroom.; On Day 43, Steven was set a task to interview the new housemates in 'Open Up to Steven'.; On Day 44, Helen was set a 'Puppet Therapy' task to encourage housemates to communicate openly with each other about their relationships and issues.
Week 6: Armageddon Week	Twists	On Day 39, as part of Armageddon Week the housemates nominated as usual to avoid suspicions from the housemates.; On Day 40, Big Brother revealed to the housemates that Ash, Ashleigh and Marlon were the three housemates that received the most nominations. Between the three of them, Marlon was the one with the most nominations and was therefore evicted.; Following Marlon's eviction, all the original housemates, excluding Helen, were nominated automatically for eviction. The three new housemates; Biannca, Pav and Zoe, decided which one of them was to be evicted on Day 44.; As new housemates, Biannca, Pav and Zoe faced the public vote to save one of them from eviction.
Week 6: Armageddon Week	Entrances	On Day 40, Biannca, Pav, and Zoe entered the Big Brother house.
Week 6: Armageddon Week	Exits	On Day 40, Marlon was the sixth housemate to be evicted after receiving the most nominations.; On Day 44, Biannca was seventh evicted from the house after receiving the fewest votes to save.; On Day 44, Pav and Zoe chose Danielle to be the eighth housemate to be evicted.
Week 7	Tasks	On Day 45, housemates took part in a copycat task with one team performing in a variety of categories and the other team having to copy the performance. Christopher judged each performance and selected Team A (Helen, Ash, Ashleigh, Zoe and Steven) as the winners. Them and Christopher received a takeaway reward.; On Day 46, housemates competed in teams in a festival-themed 'Bruvstock' task. Teams had to choreograph, practice and perform a headline act, with Big Brother selecting the winning team. For winning the task, Mark, Helen, Winston, Chris and Steven were rewarded with a VIP party. Zoe and Ash were selected as the winning team's groupies and also attended the party.; On Day 49, the housemates started their next shopping task and split into two teams; the blue team (Chris, Christopher, Pav, Steven and Zoe) and the red team (Ash, Ashleigh, Helen, Mark and Winston). The teams were pre-selected by Big Brother so that the most confident housemates were on the red team. The teams went head-to-head in a number of challenges, with the blue team believing that the team which won the most challenges would win a luxury shopping budget and the losing team would have only basic rations. However, the challenges were rigged so that the red team would always win, with the red team being aware that the real shopping task was to convince the blue team that they were all losers. On Day 50, the teams took part in the final, and only fair, challenge. If the red team won this challenge, all housemates would pass the shopping task, however, if they lost, they would all fail. After the reds won the task, the housemates received a luxury budget.; On Day 51, Ash was set a secret mission to become 'Angry Ash' and lose his temper with the other housemates. Big Brother deemed him to have failed this task.
Week 7	Twists	On Day 46, the public selected Ashleigh as the next Power Housemate via a poll on the Big Brother app.; On Day 47, Ashleigh chose Chris to join her as Power Housemate, forming the Power Alliance. Ashleigh and Chris then nominated Steven before selecting Mark to join the Power Alliance, which then nominated Ash.; On Day 48, the Power Alliance were allowed 60 seconds to speak to each of former housemates Biannca, Danielle and Matthew to receive advice on their nominations. Following this, the Power Alliance nominated Pav and Zoe. Big Brother then revealed the Power Alliance to the house and gave nominated housemates the opportunity to save one of themselves from eviction and swap with a Power Alliance member. Ash was saved and replaced with Ashleigh.
Week 7	Punishments	On Day 45, after losing a task, the losing team made up of Chris, Mark, Pav and Winston were sent to the 'naughty step' after eating some of the winning team's takeaway reward. Mark was later sent to the 'naughty step' a second time for continuing to eat the winners' reward.; On Day 51, Steven was punished for discussing nominations.
Week 7	Exits	On Day 44, Kimberly left the house temporarily due to an unknown illness, but on Day 45 it was revealed that she would not be returning. Kimberly later revealed that she had suffered an ectopic pregnancy after having had sex in the Big Brother house with fellow housemate Steven.; On Day 47, the Power Alliance chose Steven, and then Ash to face eviction. On Day 48, they also nominated Pav and Zoe. Later that day Steven, Ash, Pav and Zoe had to choose one of themselves to become safe and one Power Alliance member to replace them; they chose Ash to be saved and Ashleigh to face eviction.; On Day 51, Steven became the ninth housemate to be evicted.
Week 8	Tasks	On Day 52, the housemates split into two teams and competed in a Step Up-themed task. Housemates had to learn dance moves performed by professional dancers via a pre-recorded video. Via the Big Brother app, the public chose Ashleigh, Christopher, Ash and Mark as the winning team, who, along with Zoe who acted as a dance teacher, were rewarded with a Las Vegas-themed party.; On Day 54, as part of People Power, Winston was chosen by the public to be responsible for who got their letters from home. As he was voted for, Winston automatically received his letter, and then chose Ash, Ashleigh, Helen and Pav to receive their letters, therefore deleting Chris, Christopher, Mark and Zoe's.; On Day 55, housemates began the 'Housemates vs the Internet' shopping task. Housemates would gain 'hits' for completing a series of challenges, and if this exceeded a predetermined value, housemates would pass the task and win a luxury shopping budget. For the first part of the shopping task, housemates recorded 20-second videos which were then posted on the Big Brother website. Housemates passed this part of the task after the videos each received more than 1,000 hits. As Ash's video received the most hits, he won a bottle of champagne. In the next challenge, Ash, Chris, Mark and Zoe became a search engine and had to truthfully answer questions set to them by the public. They failed this part of the task. Later that day, Christopher, Pav and Winston became 'Webcam Boys' and had to obey demands set by Luisa Zissman. Housemates passed this challenge. On Day 56, for the final challenge, 'HousemateCompare.com', housemates had to correctly identify which housemates had been voted the "most" and "least" by the public in a series of categories. Housemates failed this challenge and failed the shopping task overall, meaning they received only basic food rations next week.; On Day 56, housemates gathered and were given questions to answer about their fellow housemates. They had to answer all questions honestly.; On Day 57, as part of People Power, housemates watched a viewers' focus group, presented by Matt Johnson, with members of the public giving their honest opinions on the housemates.; On Day 58, Zoe was set a secret mission to tell the other housemates made-up, showbiz stories. For passing her task, Zoe was rewarded with a showbiz cake.
Week 8	Twists	On Day 51, the power returned and was given to the public via the Big Brother app. Their first task was to decide who should be immune from eviction this week. They chose Ashleigh.
Week 8	Exits	On Day 51, Ashleigh was chosen by the public to be immune from this week's nominations in People Power, and on Day 53, Chris, Pav and Zoe were nominated for eviction.; On Day 58, Zoe became the tenth housemate to be evicted.
Week 9	Tasks	On Day 59, Helen, Mark and Winston competed in Big Brother's Strongest Housemate. They were faced with a number of different challenges to test their physical strength, mental strength and willpower. After all the challenges, Helen was announced as the strongest housemate overall. She was rewarded with a luxury meal and chose Mark to join her.; On Day 60, housemates took part in a wildlife task where they had to replicate whatever actions were described to them by a wildlife commentator. Big Brother was satisfied with their efforts and rewarded the housemates with a jungle themed party.; On Day 61, Ash had to perform a magic show for his fellow housemates.; On Day 62, in the Power of Money shopping task, Ash and Winston were given the chance to add to the prize fund by entering Helen's Salon. After previously making mistakes whilst cutting Christopher and Mark's hair, Helen was given the opportunity to cut Ash and Winston's in the same way if they chose to accept. However, as both Ash and Winston refused, no more money was added to the fund. The same day, the housemates who did not receive their letters from home; Chris, Christopher and Mark were given the chance to add £6,000 to the fund as they were told they can spend time with one of their family members. Before spending time with them, they were told for every second they spend with their loved ones, the money will go down by £20. All three let the money drain so nothing was added to the prize fund. A further £500 was added to the fund after some housemates drank a stinky tofu cocktail. The task continued to Day 63 where Mark lost out on banking £1,500 after wrongly predicting which bowl a meerkat would eat out of, but the group then earned £5,000 for unlocking a vault by identifying what housemates said about them by the quotes read out to them. The public then voted Ashleigh as the best judge of character. In the final part of the task, every housemate were individually told they had the chance to take the banked £15,500 for themselves or leave it for the winner. Ash, Chris and Mark all decided to take the money, however this was a lie. The real task was that Ashleigh, the best judge of character, had to predict which three would take the money. As she predicted incorrectly, the extra money was lost and the prize fund remained at £100,000.
Week 9	Twists	On Day 61, housemates nominated face-to-face. As Christopher, Mark, Pav and Winston received the most nominations, they face eviction.; On Day 62 and 63, as part of The Power of Money twist, the housemates were able to add up to £25,000 to the prize fund. They only secured £15,500. However, this was then lost by Ashleigh in the final task.
Week 9	Punishments	On Day 63, Helen was given her third warning after using threatening language when talking about Ashleigh.; On Day 64, Ash, Helen and Winston broke into the camera runs through a fire exit in the bedroom. They were swiftly returned to the house, but on Day 65, the housemates were told that as punishment for this rule break, the bedroom would be out of bounds, the hot water would be turned off and all of the basic kitchen rations were removed until further notice. As further punishment, Ash, Helen and Winston were put in stocks while the other housemates vented their anger towards them before throwing buckets of slop at them.
Week 9	Exits	On Day 61, Christopher, Mark, Pav and Winston were nominated by their fellow housemates face-to-face, then Chris joined them on Day 62 following a Power of Money twist.; On Day 65, Mark became the eleventh housemate to be evicted, followed by Winston, who became the twelfth housemate to be evicted.
Week 10	Tasks	On Day 66, the housemates were asked to create a CV about themselves with their qualities as to why they make a good housemate and therefore deserve a place in the final. They were then interviewed by Big Brother. They then faced the ultimate task to show their worthiness. This included a mystery box, gunge, a face-to-face nomination, hair removal and chilli eating. Big Brother judged housemates in the task based on entertainment and performance. Ash was announced as the winner, with Christopher second and Helen third.; On Day 67, the house turned into a courtroom and Ashleigh and Helen both stood trial as to who is the main cause of the divide in the house. Ash, Pav and ex-housemates Kimberly and Steven were supporting Helen's case, whilst Chris, Christopher and ex-housemates Danielle and Matthew supported Ashleigh's. Body language expert Judi James was the judge, and eventually gave her verdict that Helen was guilty of causing the divide.; On Day 68, Ashleigh and Pav became celebrity divas and had to give demands to their fellow housemates. The other housemates had to do everything the divas asked for. They then had to be papped by a photographer in a number of situations. These included Ashleigh in bed with whom she thought was the sexiest housemate and Pav smooching with the housemate he thought would win. They were then interviewed by a superfan, Lucy. However what they did not know was the interview was fake and the questions were actually being asked by Chris and Helen.; On Day 70, the finalists were taught with how to deal with life after Big Brother. The housemates were faced with questions from the public whilst ex-housemates Danielle and Zoe returned to give them media training and judging their answers. For the next part of the task, ex-housemates Biannca and Mark re-entered the house to teach the finalists how to make a memorable exit from the house. For the final part of the task, the housemates were taught how to promote different items in advertisements. Steven and Winston returned to teach them. As the housemates passed the overall task, they were rewarded with a party with ex-housemates Biannca, Danielle, Mark, Steven, Winston and Zoe.
Week 10	Twists	On Day 68, Helen was fake evicted. Hours later, Power Housemates, Ash and Christopher chose Chris to be evicted. Unbeknownst to them, Chris was also fake evicted and moved to Big Brother's spare room where he joined Helen. They returned to the house on Day 69. Big Brother then announced to the house that they were all in the final.
Week 10	Exits	On Day 68, Chris and Helen were fake evicted and moved to Big Brother's Spare Room. They returned to the house on Day 69.; On Day 72, Pav and Chris left the house in sixth and fifth, followed by Ash in fourth, then Christopher in third. Helen was then announced as the winner of Big Brother 2014, meaning Ashleigh finished second.

== Production ==
=== Auditions ===
Auditions for the series opened on 19 August 2013, the same day as the final of Big Brother 14. Like the previous series, there were no open auditions. Housemates were chosen from online applications. In order to become a housemate, applicants were required to record a 90-second video and complete an online application form.

=== Presenters ===
Emma Willis returned as the main presenter of the show. She also continued to present Big Brother's Bit on the Side, along with Celebrity Big Brother 11 winner Rylan Clark and Iain Lee. Celebrity Big Brother 13 housemate Luisa Zissman acted as a regular panellist on the show. Matt Johnson guest hosted an episode of Bit on the Psych in July.

=== Eye logo ===
The official eye logo was unveiled by Channel 5 on 9 May 2014. It had a futuristic look, which coincided with the futuristic themed house.

=== House ===
On 16 May 2014, it was announced that the house would be given a futuristic makeover. "The house has been given a futuristic makeover – renovated and redesigned to feature stark open spaces, sleek, clean lines and technology instead of the sumptuous furnishings and ornate decorations from the last home." Official house pictures were released on 2 June 2014. The new house had a dark, futuristic design with each area featuring its own monitor. Similar to the previous series, the Diary Room was at the top of the stairs. However the layout for the house remained almost identical to Big Brother 14, except for the bedroom, which was located where the Safe House was, and the bathroom, which replaced the bedroom. The bedroom included eight narrowly shaped double beds as well as a walk-in wardrobe for housemates to store their belongings. In the garden, the Treehouse was replaced by a spiral staircase leading to a "Gogglebox" pod where housemates could spy on each other. The garden also featured a large circular pool and a smoking area. Geometric heads were a common theme within the house as they served as ornaments, containers and planters.

A new addition to the House in the series was the Control Room, which was used as part of the series' Power theme. The Housemate who was equipped with the Power was able to access the Control Room and view various information about the other Housemates, such as their VTs, Diary Room entries and public opinions of them, in order to inform their decisions as the Power Housemate. The Control Room was occupied by a computerised female voice known as Iris, who communicated with the Power Housemate and talked them through their options.

=== Teasers ===
On 9 May 2014, Channel 5 released the first 10-second teaser for the new series hinting at the "Power" theme and also featured the new eye logo. On 16 May 2014, a second teaser was released confirming the new title for the series – Big Brother: Power Trip. A minute-long trailer confirming the new series title was revealed on 22 May 2014. The advert also featured Willis and Clark. The official countdown adverts began airing on 29 May 2014 with just seven days to go before the launch.

=== Sponsorship ===
SuperCasino remained the headline sponsor to the show after renewing their contract. The new contract covers both the fifteenth regular series and the fourteenth edition of Celebrity Big Brother, which will air three days afterwards. The deal marked the first time since 2011 that a summer sponsor of Big Brother has renewed their deal for a second term.

== Ratings and reception ==
=== Television ratings ===
Official ratings are taken from BARB.

	Viewers (millions)										
	Week 1		Week 2	Week 3	Week 4	Week 5	Week 6	Week 7	Week 8	Week 9	Week 10
Saturday		1.3	1.16	1.13	1.27	1.18	1.19	1.35	1.14	1.02	1.07
Sunday		1.67	1.43	1.42	1.34	1.32	1.1	1.63	1.34	1.29	1.4
Monday		1.38	1.67	1.54	1.36	1.62	1.79	1.66	1.51	1.49	1.46
Monday		1.18	1.67	1.54	1.36	1.62	1.79	1.66	1.51	1.49	1.46
Tuesday		1.71	1.49	1.45	1.33	1.38	1.53	1.39	1.44	1.29	1.48
Wednesday		1.56	1.65	1.41	1.51	1.49	1.63	1.45	1.57	1.46	1.63
Thursday	2.27	1.22	1.52	1.57	1.19	1.59	1.78	1.57	1.62	1.45	1.49
Friday	1.88	1.23	1.41	1.5	1.37	1.46	1.46	1.49	1.31	1.48	1.73
Friday	1.88	1.23	1.41	1.5	1.37	1.46	1.46	1.49	1.31	1.48	1.73
Weekly average	1.51		1.48	1.43	1.34	1.43	1.5	1.51	1.42	1.35	1.47
Running average	1.51		1.5	1.48	1.45	1.45	1.45	1.46	1.46	1.45	1.45
Series average	1.45										

=== Controversy and criticism ===
Ofcom received over 1,500 complaints for Helen Wood and Pauline Bennett bullying Jale Karaturp. Helen received a warning on Day 12 due to bullying Jale and Day 21 she received another warning due to using threatening behaviour to housemate Matthew Davies.

In Week 7, having become the latest Power Housemate, Ashleigh was told she would be exempt from this week's public vote. After she joined forces with Chris and Mark to become the Power Alliance, which would exclusively decide who would face eviction, Channel 5 announced to the public that all members of the Power Alliance would be immune from eviction. Despite this, on Day 48 the Power Alliance twist came to an end with Ashleigh being put up for eviction. Big Brother fans responded furiously to the news, accusing show bosses of lying and misleading both the housemates and the public. However, the broadcaster declined the opportunity to explain the twist, instead answering simply: "No comment."

Shortly after his eviction, ex-housemate Steven Goode criticised the show for unhygienic living conditions within the house, complaining of food and dirty clothes being left lying around, and a general bad smell in the house. Goode also criticised the show's medical staff after it emerged that his lover, ex-housemate Kimberly Kisselovich, had suffered from an ectopic pregnancy, as a result of sexual intercourse with him in the house. The show's producers have responded to his complaints with the statement "Housemates' welfare is our main priority and we applied that to Kimberly."

On 8 September 2014 Ofcom announced that 3,820 complaints had been rejected for Big Brother, 489 of the complaints aimed towards the allegations of the final being rigged in Helen's favour. Despite all this Ofcom also announced that an investigation will take place of the episode airing on 7 August 2014 which was Day 64 over the broadcast of offensive language before watershed. An Ofcom spokesperson said; "Ofcom is currently investigating the broadcast of offensive language before the watershed in an episode of Big Brother on August 7th. After carefully assessing viewer complaints about the rest of the series, Ofcom did not consider they raised issues warranting investigation under our rules."
