= Helen Wood (television personality) =

English television personality and journalist

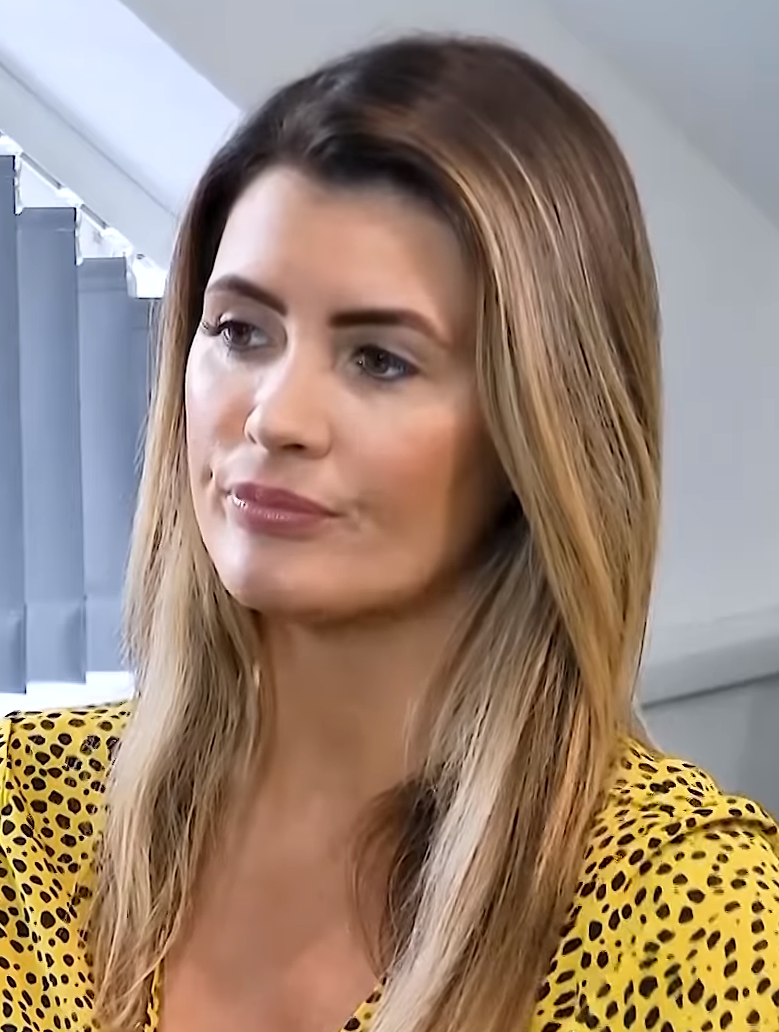
- Wood in 2019
- Born: Bolton Borough, England
- Occupations: Television personality; columnist; former escort
- Years active: 2014–2020
- Known for: Wayne Rooney affair
- Television: Big Brother UK
- Children: 1

Helen Wood is an English media personality, reality television star, columnist and former escort. She is best known for her extramarital affair with footballer Wayne Rooney and for her controversial win of the fifteenth series of Big Brother UK.

== Early life ==
Wood was born in Bolton and has two brothers. In her memoir she claimed she had a troubled upbringing and was placed in to foster care at the age of 14, after leaving home. While in school Wood became pregnant with her only child, born in 2003. She attended Thornleigh Salesian College.

== Career ==
In 2006, Wood was a single mother in debt and was recruited in to escort work by former friend, Jenny Thompson. In 2010, Thompson sold a story to the News of the World, claiming she and Wood were each paid £1,000 for a threesome with footballer Wayne Rooney in a Manchester hotel in July of 2008, whilst his wife Coleen Rooney was five months pregnant. It was reported that Rooney's solicitors unsuccessfully tried to fight the allegations when they originally surfaced in early August 2010. Wood allegedly attempted to gain support from Rooney's agent to suppress the story, however, Wood eventually sold her version of events for £40,000.

In 2011, an unnamed actor took out a court injunction to prevent Wood from revealing their relationship. The actor paid for Wood after booking her via an escorting agency in March 2008. Despite the injunction, the actor's name was revealed in the Irish and US press. Former publicist Max Clifford represented Wood at the time - shortly after the injunction was carried out, both Wood and Clifford appeared to no longer be associated.

In 2014, Wood entered the fifteenth series of Big Brother UK, which she controversially won. During her time on the show she was involved in multiple controversies, including receiving over 1,500 Ofcom complaints for bullying housemate Jale Karaturp, alongside fellow housemate Pauline Bennett. Wood received a warning on Day 12 for the bullying, she received a second warning on Day 21 for threatening fellow housemate Matthew Davies. She was involved in a feud with fellow housemate Danielle McMahon, after the series had finished, Wood was arrested in March 2015 following a physical altercation with McMahon. Wood won the show on Day 72, with 50.6% of the vote to win, leaving the house to boos from the crowd, being the only winner of the show to do so until Rochelle Rackham in 2026. After Wood's win fans of the show claimed the result was fixed, causing Channel 5 to respond.

Wood returned in the sixteenth series of Big Brother, for two weeks as a "Time Warp Housemate" alongside former housemates; Aisleyne Horgan-Wallace, Brian Belo and Nikki Grahame. Wood clashed with all three fellow Time Warp Housemates, specifically Brian Belo, branding him a psycho, comparing him to a murderer and telling him that he looked like a rapist. This led to Belo climbing over the Big Brother house wall and quitting the show. Subsequently, Wood received a formal and final warning. The incident between Belo and Wood caused over 2,000 Ofcom complaints, which launched an official Ofcom investigation.

Channel 5 boss, Ben Frow, released a statement following the controversy, banning her from appearing on Channel 5 programming again, he stated; "it was a mistake in allowing her to be a housemate for a second time".

After her appearances on Big Brother UK, Wood became a columnist for British tabloid newspaper, Daily Star. In 2016 she wrote a negative column on British reality television star, Jemma Lucy's appearance on MTV UK's Ex on the Beach series 5, branding Lucy a "dog" and "a fanny on legs", causing an online feud between the two.

In 2019, Wood released her autobiography A Man's World.

== Filmography ==
Film and television
Year	Title	Role	Notes
2011	This Morning	Self; guest	2 episodes
2011	Newsnight	Self; guest	1 episode
2014	Big Brother UK series 15	Self; housemate	Winner, 72 episodes
2014	Big Brother's Bit on the Side	Self; ex-housemate	2 episodes
2014	The Wright Stuff	Self; guest	1 episode
2015	Big Brother UK series 16	Self; houseguest	15 episodes
2016	Sam Delaney's News Thing	Self; guest	3 episodes
2019	Good Morning Britain	Self; guest	1 episode
