= Celebrity Coach Trip series 3 =

Celebrity Coach Trip
- Season 3
- No. of days: 10
- Winners: Derek Martin; John Altman
- Runners-up: Bobby Ball; Tommy Cannon

Release
- Original network: Channel 4
- Original release: 16 January – 27 January 2012

Additional information
- Filming dates: 4 July – 18 July 2011

Series chronology
- ← Previous; Series 2 Next → Series 4

Celebrity Coach Trip 3 was the third season of Celebrity Coach Trip, a British Channel 4 travel reality TV show. It aired from 16 January 2012. The series took place across the Mediterranean, starting off in Ljubljana, Slovenia. Famous passengers during the third season included Paul Burrell, the former butler to Princess Diana, and former Tory MP Edwina Currie.

== Production ==
Filming for the series took place from the 4th to the 18th of July 2011. The least popular couples were voted off and the remaining couple received a £1000 prize for charity.

== Voting system ==
The Voting system on this series was:

Days 1 to 6 a yellow card
Days 7 to 9 an automatic red card

== Contestants ==
Indicates that the couple were aboard the coach
Indicates that the couple were immune from votes
Indicates that the couple were voted as the most popular couple and won the series
Indicates that the couple were voted as the second most popular couple
Indicates that the couple were voted as the third most popular couple
Indicates that the couple got a yellow card
Indicates that the couple got a red card

Celebrity Couple	Trip Duration (Days)									
Celebrity Couple	1	2	3	4	5	6	7	8	9	10
Aisleyne & Nikki (original 5)	Yellow card		Red card	Eliminated 1st on 18 January 2012						
Edwina & John (original 5)		Yellow card		Red card	Eliminated 2nd on 19 January 2012					
Bruce & Scott (replaced Edwina & John)	Not on coach						Red card	Eliminated 3rd on 24 January 2012		
Jean & Paul (original 5)					Yellow card			Red card	Eliminated 4th on 25 January 2012	
Alison & Sharon (replaced Bruce & Scott)	Not on coach								Red card	Eliminated 5th on 26 January 2012
Mike & Pat (replaced Jean & Paul)	Not on coach									Third on 27 January 2012
Chantelle & Jude (replaced Aisleyne & Nikki)	Not on coach					Yellow card				Third on 27 January 2012
Bobby & Tommy (original 5)										Second on 27 January 2012
Derek and John (original 5)										Winners on 27 January 2012

== Voting history ==
Couple who won the series	Couple who were yellow carded
Couple who were runners up	Couple who were red carded
Couple who were third	Couple who were immune from votes

	Day										
	1	2	3	4	5	6	7	8	9	10	
Derek John	Edwina; John	Edwina; John	Aisleyne; Nikki	Jean; Paul	Jean; Paul	Chantelle; Jude	Bruce; Scott	Jean; Paul	Alison; Sharon	Bobby; Tommy	Winners; 3 votes
Bobby Tommy	Edwina; John	Aisleyne; Nikki	Aisleyne; Nikki	Edwina; John	Jean; Paul	Chantelle; Jude	Bruce; Scott	Chantelle; Jude	Alison; Sharon	Derek; John	Second; 1 votes
Chantelle Jude	Not on coach				Bobby; Tommy	Derek; John	Bruce; Scott	Jean; Jean	Bobby; Tommy	Derek; John	Third; 0 votes
Mike Pat	Not on coach								Chantelle; Jude	Derek; John	Third; 0 votes
Alison Sharon	Not on coach							Jean; Paul	Bobby; Tommy	Red Carded (Day 9)	
Jean Paul	Aisleyne; Nikki	Aisleyne; Nikki	Aisleyne; Nikki	Edwina; John	Derek; John	Chantelle; Jude	Bruce; Scott	Chantelle; Jude	Red Carded (Day 8)		
Bruce Scott	Not on coach					Bobby; Tommy	Jean; Paul	Red Carded (Day 7)			
Edwina John	Aisleyne; Nikki	Jean; Paul	Aisleyne; Nikki	Jean; Paul	Red Carded (Day 4)						
Aisleyne Nikki	Jean; Paul	Edwina; John	Jean; Paul	Red Carded (Day 3)							
Walked	None										
Voted Off	Aisleyne; Nikki; 2 votes	Edwina; John; 2 votes	Aisleyne; Nikki; 4 votes	Edwina; John; 2 votes	Jean; Paul; 2 votes	Chantelle; Jude; 3 votes	Bruce; Scott; 4 votes	Jean; Paul; 3 votes	Alison; Sharon; 2 votes	None	

== The trip by day ==
Day	Location	Activity		
Day	Location	Morning	Afternoon	
1	Ljubljana	Clown lesson	Trip to a farm	
2	Maribor	Frisbee lesson	Tobogganing	
3	Zagreb	Judo	Cookery lesson	
4	Plitvice National Park	Survival skills	Yoga	
5	Zadar	White water kayaking	Glass blowing	
6	Split	Croatian folk music	Cocktail making	
7	Riccione	Mini golf	Dolphin training	
8	Rimini	Life-drawing class	Beach trip	
9	Faenza	Chariot racing	Picture competition	
10	Rome	Bologna	Spaghetti bolognese cooking	Sewer rafting
