= Big Brother (British TV series) series 16 =

Big Brother
- Series 16
- Series sixteen logo
- Presented by: Emma Willis
- No. of days: 66
- No. of housemates: 18
- Winner: Chloe Wilburn
- Runner-up: Joel Williams
- Companion shows: Big Brother's Bit on the Side
- No. of episodes: 66

Release
- Original network: Channel 5
- Original release: 12 May – 16 July 2015

Series chronology
- ← Previous; Series 15 Next → Series 17

Big Brother 2015, also known as Big Brother 16 and Big Brother: Timebomb, is the sixteenth series of the British reality television series Big Brother, hosted by Emma Willis and narrated by Marcus Bentley. The series launched on Channel 5 in the United Kingdom and TV3 in the Republic of Ireland on 12 May 2015 and ended on 16 July 2015, a week earlier than planned. This was the earliest launch of a Big Brother series since the show's inception in 2000. It is the fifth regular series and the thirteenth series of Big Brother overall to air on Channel 5, and is the first regular series to air in May since Big Brother 8 in 2007. It is also the first series to air in Ireland since its move to Channel 5 in 2011. On 2 February 2015, it was revealed that Willis had stepped down as a host on the show's spin-off series Big Brother's Bit on the Side, though Rylan Clark continued.

It is the first and only regular series to credit Denis O'Connor as creative director. On Day 17, Aaron Frew was ejected from the House after flashing fellow Housemate Joel Williams. It is the second series to feature returning housemates after Ultimate Big Brother with Nikki Grahame, Aisleyne Horgan Wallace, Brian Belo and Helen Wood taking part as long-term houseguests.

The series was won by Chloe Wilburn, who won the £116,100 prize fund, the largest prize money in Big Brother UK history. She also won an additional £5,000 during Cash Bomb Week.

== Housemates ==
Ahead of the launch, on 7 May 2015 it was announced that the official list of Housemates would be released two days before the series begins. This was the first time that the Housemates entering was made public knowledge prior to the launch night; in previous series', the Housemates would be unveiled live on the night. Keeping with the Timebomb theme, a countdown began at 00:01 on 8 May 2015 on the official website. It ended two days later on 10 May, and the identities of fifteen Housemates were unveiled. Fifteen Housemates entered the House on Day 1. Three new housemates entered the house on Day 18.

Name	Age on entry	Hometown	Day entered	Day exited	Result
Chloe Wilburn	25	Doncaster	1	66	Winner
Joel Williams	19	Cardiff	1	66	Runner-up
Danny Wisker	29	Margate	1	66	3rd place
Jack McDermott	23	Plymouth	1	66	4th place
Nick Henderson	19	Hertford	1	66	5th place
Matthew "Cristian" Clarkson	20	London	1	66	6th place
Sam Kay	27	Dundee	18	60	Evicted
Harry Amelia Martin	22	Loughborough	18	60	Evicted
Marc O'Neill	29	Dublin	18	53	Evicted
Simon Gross	46	Beckenham	1	1	Evicted (Note: Simon was selected by the public as one of five Housemates to participate in the series' first Timebomb challenge, fast-forwarding to the first eviction of the series where Simon was evicted immediately. Simon later re-entered the House as a full Housemate eligible to win on Day 18 as a result of another Timebomb twist.)
Simon Gross	46	Beckenham	18	46	Evicted
Jade-Martina "Jade" Lynch	24	Dublin	1	39	Evicted
Eileen Daly	51	London	1	25	Evicted
Sarah Greenwood	24	Manchester	1	18	Evicted
Kieran McLeod	30	Birmingham	1	18	Evicted
Harriet Jackson	22	London	1	18	Evicted
Amy and Sally Broadbent	27	Manchester	1	18	Evicted
Aaron Frew	24	Northampton	1	17	Ejected
Adjoa Mensah	22	Manchester	1	11	Evicted

== House guests ==
Following the eviction on Day 25, Willis revealed that former Housemates would be returning on Day 32 as part of "Time Warp" week, joining a fake-evicted Housemate in the "Secret Lair", also known as the "Timebomb Bunker" for 48 hours. The returning Housemates will then enter the main house on Day 34 as "House guests". As well as these three, a number of other faces from Big Brother's past will return to the House to take part in classic tasks and twists. On 12 June 2015, hours before the fake eviction, it was confirmed that Brian Belo, Helen Wood and Nikki Grahame would be re-entering the House. These three were originally meant to leave the House on Day 39 but Big Brother decided to extend their stay for an extra week. On Day 43, Brian voluntarily left the House by climbing over the garden wall. On Day 44, Aisleyne Horgan-Wallace entered the House as the fourth Time Warp Housemate. On Day 46, Helen and Nikki both left the House. Shortly after this, Emma revealed that more famous faces would return to stay in Big Brother's Hotel from Hell. These guests included John McCirick, Charley Uchea, Jasmine Lennard, James Jordan and Dexter Koh.

Name	Big Brother history		Duration	Reason
Name	Series	Status	Duration	Reason
Brian Belo	Big Brother 8	Winner	Day 32–43	Time Warp Housemates
Helen Wood	Big Brother 15	Winner	Day 32–46	Time Warp Housemates
Nikki Grahame	Big Brother 7	Fifth place	Day 32–46	Time Warp Housemates
Nikki Grahame	Ultimate Big Brother	Runner-up	Day 32–46	Time Warp Housemates
Aisleyne Horgan-Wallace	Big Brother 7	Third place	Day 44–53	Time Warp Housemates
Rylan Clark	Celebrity Big Brother 11	Winner	Day 37, Day 38	Part of the "Let's Do the Time Warp" shopping task
Pete Bennett	Big Brother 7	Winner	Day 37	Part of the "Let's Do the Time Warp" shopping task
Craig Phillips	Big Brother 1	Winner	Day 37	Part of the "Let's Do the Time Warp" shopping task
Rachel Rice	Big Brother 9	Winner	Day 37	Part of the "Let's Do the Time Warp" shopping task
Glyn Wise	Big Brother 7	Runner-up	Day 37	Part of the "Let's Do the Time Warp" shopping task
Mark Byron	Big Brother 15	Evicted	Day 37	Part of the "Let's Do the Time Warp" shopping task
Caroline Wharram	Big Brother 13	Evicted	Day 37	Part of the "Let's Do the Time Warp" shopping task
Rebecca Shiner	Big Brother 9	Evicted	Day 37	Part of the "Let's Do the Time Warp" shopping task
Grace Adams-Short	Big Brother 7	Evicted	Day 37	Part of the "Let's Do the Time Warp" shopping task
Mario Mugan	Big Brother 11	Third place	Day 37	Part of the "Let's Do the Time Warp" shopping task
Jon Tickle	Big Brother 4	Evicted	Day 37	Part of the "Let's Do the Time Warp" shopping task
Ben Duncan	Big Brother 11	Evicted	Day 37	Part of the "Let's Do the Time Warp" shopping task
Kathreya Kasisopa	Big Brother 9	Evicted	Day 37	Part of the "Let's Do the Time Warp" shopping task
Victor Ebuwa	Big Brother 5	Evicted	Day 37	Part of the "Let's Do the Time Warp" shopping task
Victor Ebuwa	Ultimate Big Brother	Fourth place	Day 37	Part of the "Let's Do the Time Warp" shopping task
Lisa Appleton	Big Brother 9	Evicted	Day 37	Part of the "Let's Do the Time Warp" shopping task
Darnell Swallow	Big Brother 9	Fifth place	Day 37	Part of the "Let's Do the Time Warp" shopping task
Matthew Davies	Big Brother 15	Evicted	Day 37	Part of the "Let's Do the Time Warp" shopping task
Jack and Joe Glenny	Big Brother 14	Fourth place	Day 37	Part of the "Let's Do the Time Warp" shopping task
Alex Sibley	Big Brother 3	Third place	Day 37	Part of the "Let's Do the Time Warp" shopping task
Stuart Hosking	Big Brother 2	Evicted	Day 37	Part of the "Let's Do the Time Warp" shopping task
Charley Uchea	Big Brother 8	Evicted	Day 37; Day 49–50	Part of the "Let's Do The Time Warp" shopping task To stay in Big Brother's Hotel from Hell
Dexter Koh	Big Brother 14	Runner-up	Day 37; Day 50–51	Part of the "Let's Do The Time Warp" shopping task To stay in Big Brother's Hotel from Hell
John McCririck	Celebrity Big Brother 3	Evicted	Day 49–50	To stay in Big Brother's Hotel from Hell
John McCririck	Ultimate Big Brother	Evicted	Day 49–50	To stay in Big Brother's Hotel from Hell
Jasmine Lennard	Celebrity Big Brother 10	Evicted	Day 50–52	To stay in Big Brother's Hotel from Hell
James Jordan	Celebrity Big Brother 14	Third place	Day 51–52	To stay in Big Brother's Hotel from Hell

== Nominations table ==
	Week 1	Week 2	Week 3	Week 4	Week 5	Week 6	Week 7	Week 8	Week 9	Week 10 Final		Nominations received
Chloe	No nominations	Sarah, Cristian	Sarah, Cristian	Not eligible	Simon, Marc	Not eligible	Not eligible	Marc, Harry Amelia	Not eligible	Winner (Day 66)		3
Joel	No nominations	Adjoa, Sarah	Jade, Nick	Not eligible	Marc, Sam	Not eligible	Danny	Sam, Harry Amelia	Sam	Runner-up (Day 66)		10
Danny	No nominations	Joel, Jade	Jade, Joel	Not eligible	Marc, Sam	Not eligible	Nick	Marc, Sam	Harry Amelia	Third place (Day 66)		2
Jack	No nominations	Adjoa, Eileen	Jade, Eileen	Not eligible	Sam, Simon	Not eligible	Joel	Marc, Sam	Not eligible	Fourth place (Day 66)		6
Nick	No nominations	Adjoa, Sarah	Chloe, Aaron	Not eligible	Simon, Marc	Not eligible	Not eligible	Marc, Sam	Not eligible	Fifth place (Day 66)		5
Cristian	No nominations	Sarah, Chloe	Aaron, Jade	Not eligible	Simon, Marc	Not eligible	Sam	Marc, Harry Amelia	Nick	Sixth place (Day 66)		10
Sam	Not in House			Eileen, Jack, Joel	Joel, Simon	Not eligible	Harry Amelia	Harry Amelia, Jack	Jack	Evicted (Day 60)		13
Harry Amelia	Not in House			Exempt	Marc, Sam	Not eligible	Simon	Sam, Jack	Not eligible	Evicted (Day 60)		9
Marc	Not in House			Exempt	Harry Amelia, Joel	Harry Amelia, Chloe, Cristian, Jade	Exempt	Danny, Cristian	Evicted (Day 53)			12
Simon	No nominations	Evicted (Day 1)		Eileen, Jack, Joel	Jack, Harry Amelia	Not eligible	Jack	Re-evicted (Day 46)				7
Jade	No nominations	Cristian, Eileen	Eileen, Amy & Sally	Not eligible	Simon, Sam	Not eligible	Cristian	Evicted (Day 39)				12
Eileen	No nominations	Kieran, Jade	Jade, Kieran	Not eligible	Evicted (Day 25)							9
Sarah	No nominations	Joel, Nick	Joel, Eileen	Evicted (Day 18)								5
Kieran	No nominations	Eileen, Adjoa	Joel, Eileen	Evicted (Day 18)								3
Harriet	No nominations	Cristian, Eileen	Cristian, Jade	Evicted (Day 18)								0
Amy & Sally	No nominations	Jade, Cristian	Jade, Aaron	Evicted (Day 18)								2
Aaron	No nominations	Cristian, Amy & Sally	Jade, Nick	Ejected (Day 17)								3
Adjoa	No nominations	Kieran, Joel	Evicted (Day 11)									4
Time Warp Housemates
Aisleyne	Not in House							Marc, Sam	Left (Day 53)			N/A
Nikki	Not in House					Harry Amelia, Chloe, Cristian, Jade	Exempt	Left (Day 46)				N/A
Helen	Not in House					Harry Amelia, Chloe, Cristian, Jade	Exempt	Left (Day 46)				N/A
Brian	Not in House					Harry Amelia, Chloe, Cristian, Jade	Exempt	Walked (Day 43)				N/A
Notes	1	2, 3	2, 4	5	2, 6	7	8	2, 9	10, 11	12		
Against public vote	none	Adjoa, Eileen, Sarah	Amy & Sally, Chloe, Danny, Harriet, Kieran, Sarah	Eileen, Joel	Marc, Sam, Simon	Chloe, Cristian, Harry Amelia, Jade	Cristian, Danny, Harry Amelia, Jack, Joel, Nick, Sam, Simon	Harry Amelia, Jack, Marc, Sam	Chloe, Harry Amelia, Jack, Sam	Chloe, Cristian, Danny, Jack, Joel, Nick		
Ejected	none		Aaron	none								
Evicted	Simon; Evicted by timebomb	Adjoa; Most votes to evict	Amy & Sally; Most votes to evict	Eileen; Most votes to evict	Marc; Most votes to move	Jade; Most votes to evict	Simon; Most votes (out of 2) to evict	Marc; Most votes to evict	Harry Amelia; Most votes to evict	Cristian; Fewest votes (out of 6)	Danny; Fewest votes (out of 3)	
Evicted	Simon; Evicted by timebomb	Adjoa; Most votes to evict	Harriet; Most votes to evict	Eileen; Most votes to evict	Marc; Most votes to move	Jade; Most votes to evict	Simon; Most votes (out of 2) to evict	Marc; Most votes to evict	Harry Amelia; Most votes to evict	Nick; Fewest votes (out of 6)	Danny; Fewest votes (out of 3)	
Evicted	Simon; Evicted by timebomb	Adjoa; Most votes to evict	Harriet; Most votes to evict	Eileen; Most votes to evict	Marc; Most votes to move	Jade; Most votes to evict	Simon; Most votes (out of 2) to evict	Marc; Most votes to evict	Harry Amelia; Most votes to evict	Nick; Fewest votes (out of 6)	Joel; Fewest votes (out of 2)	
Evicted	Simon; Evicted by timebomb	Adjoa; Most votes to evict	Kieran; Most votes to evict	Eileen; Most votes to evict	Marc; Most votes to move	Jade; Most votes to evict	Simon; Most votes (out of 2) to evict	Marc; Most votes to evict	Sam; Housemates' choice to evict	Jack; Fewest votes (out of 4)	Joel; Fewest votes (out of 2)	
Evicted	Simon; Evicted by timebomb	Adjoa; Most votes to evict	Sarah; Most votes to evict	Eileen; Most votes to evict	Marc; Most votes to move	Jade; Most votes to evict	Simon; Most votes (out of 2) to evict	Marc; Most votes to evict	Sam; Housemates' choice to evict	Chloe; Most votes to win		

Notes

- ^Note 1: On launch night, the public voted for five housemates to participate in the series' first Timebomb challenge, fast-forwarding to the first eviction of the series. During the challenge, Jack won three immunity passes to use at any time during the series, Nick was forced to nominate face-to-face during every week of nominations, Jade won personal luxury, Adjoa received nothing and Simon was evicted immediately.
- ^Note 2: As part of the first Timebomb twist on launch night, Nick was forced to nominate face-to-face during this week of nominations.
- ^Note 3: This week the Housemates nominated face-to-face. Adjoa, Cristian, Eileen and Sarah received the most nominations. Jack was offered to give one of his immunity passes to one of the nominated housemates and he saved Cristian.
- ^Note 4: As well as finding out that they were nominated, Aaron, Cristian, Eileen, Jade, Joel, and Nick were shown who nominated them. Jack declined to give one of his immunity passes to one of the nominated housemates. It was later revealed that the real nominees were the housemates who had received the fewest nominations: Amy & Sally, Chloe, Danny, Harriet, Jack, Kieran, and Sarah. Jack was offered to give one of his immunity passes to one of the nominated housemates. He saved himself. Amy & Sally, Harriet, Kieran and Sarah were evicted on Day 18, and were replaced by Harry Amelia, Marc, Sam and Simon.
- ^Note 5: As new housemates, Harry Amelia, Marc, Sam and Simon were immune from the public vote this week. Two of the four new housemates, as chosen by an online poll, were solely responsible for nominating. The public chose Sam and Simon to nominate. As well as finding out that they were nominated, Eileen, Jack, and Joel were shown who nominated them. Jack, as one of the nominated housemates, was given the opportunity to use his final immunity pass. He chose to save himself from eviction.
- ^Note 6: The Housemates nominated face-to-face on Day 27. This week the public voted to move a Housemate rather than to evict. The chosen Housemate would move into the 'Timebomb Bunker' and would be joined by three former Housemates for the upcoming Timewarp Week. The public chose to send Marc to the Bunker.
- ^Note 7: This week Marc and the three former Housemates were the only Housemates able to nominate.
- ^Note 8: This week is nomination tag. If a Housemate receives a nomination they are automatically put up for eviction, and will then have to choose another to join them. That Housemate then must select another, and so on. This began as Jade decided to nominate Cristian after her eviction. As the final Housemate to be nominated, Nick did not have to nominate anyone else, leaving Chloe safe from the public vote. As Time Warp Week was put on pause, Marc was immune from nominations.
- ^Note 9: Aisleyne was required to nominate this week, she made her nominations face-to-face.
- ^Note 10: This week was "Cash Bomb nominations". The Housemates had to win immunity and the ability to choose one other Housemate to face eviction by pressing a button whenever the prize fund started to decrease. Joel, Danny, Cristian and Sam pressed the button and nominated Sam, Harry Amelia, Nick and Jack respectively. The nominated Housemates then had to bid money from the prize fund with the highest bidder saving themselves and being replaced by Chloe, the only eligible Housemate. Nick placed the highest bid and saved himself from eviction.
- ^Note 11: After Harry Amelia's eviction, the housemates were told that they had to evict a second housemate. The three remaining nominated housemates picked from one of three envelopes which had 1 of 3 amounts of money which would be added to the prize money in the event of the holders eviction. Jack had £1,000, Chloe had £10,000, Sam has £15,000. The house evicted Sam and £15,000 was added to the prize money.
- ^Note 12: For the final week, the public were voting for the housemate they wanted to win, rather than evict. Following the first vote count, Cristian and Nick were evicted and left the house together.

== Weekly summary ==
Week 1	Entrances	On Day 1, Chloe, Kieran, Simon, Jade, Joel, Cristian, Harriet, Jack, Amy & Sally, Adjoa, Nick, Danny, Sarah, Aaron, and Eileen entered the House.
Week 1	Twists	On Day 1, shortly after all the housemates entered the house, the public were able to vote in a poll on the Big Brother app who they wanted to face the first Timebomb twist. They selected Adjoa, Jack, Jade, Nick and Simon. They were then asked to randomly stand behind a Timebomb each in the garden, with every Timebomb holding different fates for the Housemates. Jack won three immunity passes to use at any time during the series; Nick was forced to nominate face-to-face during every week of nominations; Jade won a personal luxury shopping budget; Adjoa received nothing; and Simon was evicted immediately.; On Day 4, after a public poll on the Big Brother app, Jack was told he had been voted the winner of the series. As his prize, he was offered a BMW car worth £27,000 in exchange for his place in the House. In addition, if he took the car, the overall prize fund would disappear. He decided to stay in the House. Shortly afterwards, Nick was asked to make his first face-to-face nominations live.
Week 1	Tasks	On Day 2, the housemates were split into two teams, Girls vs Boys and were asked questions by Big Brother about their fellow housemates. To win the task, they had to correctly match the housemates with the correct clues, and they then had to explain their answers. As both teams finished with the same score, they both received rewards.; On Day 3, the housemates participated in their first shopping task. They were given four activities, and were required to endure each of them for the longest time, with the target being to collectively spend an hour performing the tasks overall. They passed, and thus won a luxury shopping budget.
Week 1	Exits	On Day 1, Simon was evicted from the house, due to the timebomb twist.
Week 2	Tasks	On Day 5, Eileen was set a secret mission to convince the housemates she is feeling a particular emotion instructed by Big Brother, and tell them a back story that justifies the emotion. As she successfully passed the task, the housemates won a party.; On Day 8, housemates were set their second shopping task, "In the Dark". The housemates each had to endure several different challenges whilst in the dark in order to pass the task. As part of the task, Danny, Eileen and Sally had to lie in bath tubs and attempt to guess what was falling on them, Cristian and Harriet had to transfer balls across a balance beam whilst avoiding swinging pendulums, and Chloe was given the secret mission of sabotaging the shopping task. She chose Aaron, Adjoa, Jack, Jade, Joel and Nick to spend a night with her in "the hole". Chloe's role as the "Dark Lord" was to ensure that at least three Housemates quit the task and returned to the Main House before sunrise. Only Jack managed to leave, and thus the housemates failed the task and received basic rations.; On Day 10, the housemates participated in a debate task. Big Brother deemed Aaron, Cristian, Harriet, Jack, Jade, Kieran, & Sarah the winners and they were treated to a dinner.
Week 2	Punishments	On Day 5, as punishment for discussing nominations, Nick was told that instead of attending a party won in a task, he would become a waiter attending the housemate's every need.; On Day 11, Amy & Sally received a formal warning, following dangerous drunken behaviour, which included intentionally throwing a cup.
Week 2	Nominations	The housemates nominated for the first time. Adjoa, Cristian, Eileen and Sarah received the most nominations and faced the public vote. Jack decided to use one of his immunity passes on Cristian, meaning that Cristian was then saved from eviction.
Week 2	Exits	On Day 11, Adjoa was evicted from the house, receiving the most votes to evict.
Week 3	Twists	On Day 11, shortly after Adjoa's eviction, Jade was asked to form a "Luxury Clique," as a result of the Timebomb that she opened on Day 1. Members of the Luxury Clique would receive large meals, access to hot water, exclusive access to the pool and Sky Room, and use of hair appliances. She chose Nick and Aaron to join her. On Day 12, she chose Joel to join the Clique, as well as Harriet, Jack and Sarah who joined through winning a task. Chloe, Cristian and Kieran joined on Day 14 by winning a task, and on Day 15, the Luxury Clique was dissolved.; Unbeknownst to the housemates, this week's nominations were reversed and this week's eviction was a quadruple eviction. On Day 15, Big Brother secretly informed Jack that the nominations were reversed to give him the opportunity to activate an immunity pass on a nominated housemate.
Week 3	Tasks	On Day 12, the housemates on basic rations competed in various tasks for an opportunity to join Jade's Luxury Clique. Harriet, Kieran, Sarah, Jack, and Amy & Sally passed their tasks. From these five, Jade chose Harriet, Jack, and Sarah to join the Clique.; On Day 14, the housemates on basic rations created original performances in teams of three, with judges Aaron, Harriet, and Jade selecting one team to join the Luxury Clique. They selected Chloe, Cristian, and Kieran as the winners over Amy & Sally, Danny, and Eileen. That afternoon, Big Brother threw a pool party for the Luxury Clique.; On Day 15, housemates were set their third shopping task, "Big Brother 2050". Housemates competed in three future-themed tasks, attempting to earn more time for the final task. Jack, Joel, and Sarah failed a telepathy task after housemates broke the rules. Aaron, Chloe, and Eileen tasted various foods and unsuccessfully attempted to guess their flavours and contents. On Day 16, Harriet, Kieran, and Nick hung on to the hands of giant clocks for as long as possible. In the end, Amy and Jade were able to complete the final task – locating clocks based on housemates' statements – in time to rebuild a time machine and pass the shopping task.
Week 3	Punishments	On Day 12, as punishment for Jade discussing nominations, Big Brother confiscated the housemates' beauty products.; On Day 17, Harriet received a formal warning for encouraging Aaron's inappropriate behaviour towards Joel.
Week 3	Nominations	The housemates nominated for the second time. Amy & Sally, Chloe, Danny, Harriet, Kieran and Sarah received the most nominations and faced the public vote.
Week 3	Exits	On Day 17, Aaron was ejected from the House for inappropriate behaviour.; On Day 18, Amy & Sally, Harriet, Kieran and Sarah were evicted from the house, respectively, after receiving the most votes to evict.
Week 4	Entrances	On Day 18, Harry Amelia, Marc and Sam entered the house. Simon then re-entered the house after a twist.
Week 4	Twists	As new housemates, Harry Amelia, Marc, Sam, and Simon were immune from the public vote this week. Two of the four new housemates, as chosen by an online poll, were solely responsible for nominating. On Day 20, the public chose Sam and Simon to nominate. Later that day, they nominated Eileen. The following day, they nominated Jack and Joel. However, Jack chose to save himself by using his last remaining immunity pass.
Week 4	Tasks	On Day 19, Joel interviewed Harry Amelia, Marc, Sam, and Simon and moderated questions from the original housemates. Big Brother rewarded housemates with snacks and alcohol for successful participation.; On Day 22, Big Brother formed an American fraternity as part of the fourth shopping task - "Beta Beta". Cristian, Harry Amelia, Marc, and Nick were the fraternity brothers and the rest of the housemates were pledges. Pledges had to obey every command from a brother and complete all the chores for the duration of the task. For the task, the pledges answered a series of questions posed by Big Brother and the brothers, during which the brothers could electrically shock any pledge for perceived dishonesty. Chloe and Simon were subsequently promoted to brother status. That evening, the pledges were asked to invent and perform humiliating stunts with a set of nasty props including yeast extract and a clown wig. The brothers selected Eileen and Danny to join them. The remaining pledges spent the night in the basement, where they secretly watched the brothers' party and listened to Marc and Simon in the Diary Room. On Day 23, pledges Jack, Jade, Joel, and Sam were set the final challenge of transferring cups of beer across a balance beam using paddles. For completing the task in the allotted time, housemates earned a luxury shopping budget.; On Day 24, Big Brother had Sam and Simon plan and host a farewell party for the two housemates whom they nominated, during which Simon led housemates in a dance routine while in drag.; On Day 25, Nick, Jack, Jade, Danny, and Simon each selected and opened a "gift" from Big Brother. Without revealing its contents to the other housemates, each had to offer his/her gift to a housemate who could accept or return it to the sender. Simon rejected Nick's gift which contained afternoon tea for two. Nick chose Harry Amelia to join him. Simon rejected Jack's gift, causing Jack to lose all his personal belongings except for a boiler suit. Jade offered Harry Amelia the gift of being handcuffed to another Housemate, which she accepted. Jade handcuffed Harry Amelia to Marc, who joined her and Nick on their date. Danny offered Sam the gift of being ignored for the entire day while wearing a bag over her head, which she accepted. Simon offered Chloe a message from home, which she rejected. That afternoon, Simon received a message from his mother in the Diary Room.
Week 4	Nominations	This week, the public voted for which two new housemates they wanted to see be the only people to nominate this week. The public chose Sam and Simon. Sam and Simon then nominated Eileen, Jack and Joel for eviction. Jack decided to use one of his immunity passes on himself, thus saving him from eviction. Due to being new housemates, Harry Amelia, Marc, Sam and Simon were immune from eviction.
Week 4	Exits	On Day 25, Eileen was evicted from the house, receiving the most votes to evict.
Week 5	Tasks	On Day 26, the housemates were told that the day had been reversed and that morning would become night, and night would become morning. Shortly after the housemates were woken up they attended a rave, and before they went to bed they were rewarded with a luxury breakfast.; On Day 27, the housemates were asked to write down some honest wishes about their fellow housemates giving them ways that they could improve their time in the house. Later on as each wish was read out to the housemates, they had to decide whether to own up to writing the wish or remain anonymous.; On Day 28, Jade was given a number of statements which she had to assign to different housemates based on her opinions. The housemates then had to correctly identify which statement was given to them. They passed the task.; On Day 29, the housemates began their next shopping task "In The Zone" where the house was split into five sections and the housemates had to take part of various tasks to take over each section. If they were successful in a zone, the housemates were allowed to roam free in it, however if they failed the task in the zone, the ones who took part were locked in. Chloe and Jack took on the Kitchen Zone where they had to eat pies until they found four numbers hiding within them. The four numbers were the combination to unlock the zone. They failed, and were then automatically locked in. Danny, Harry Amelia and Joel then took part in the Bathroom Zone by getting into a bath of disgusting things and were given statements in which they had to identify who they were about. They passed this part of the task. Next was the Bedroom Zone where Jade had to guide a blindfolded Nick and Simon across the bedroom to obtain a key to unlock the zone, avoiding obstacles, but failed this meaning they were locked in the bedroom. On Day 30, Joel and Marc took part in the Diary Room Zone where they had to guess who said what about who from quotes given to them by Big Brother, they failed this and were automatically locked in. Finally was the Garden Zone, and after only passing one challenge, Danny had just one chance to choose the luxury shopping budget box out of a choice of four. He picked the basic rations box therefore the Housemates failed the task.; On Day 31, Jack and Simon were given a secret mission to become "Night Ninjas" where they had to wait until Big Brother gave them a signal in the middle of the night then secretly cause havoc within the House by making as much mess as possible.
Week 5	Nominations	The housemates nominated for the third time. Marc, Sam and Simon received the most nominations and faced the public vote.
Week 5	Exits	On Day 32, Marc was evicted from the house. This however was a fake eviction. Marc then entered the "Timebomb Bunker". He was then joined by previous Big Brother contestants Brian Belo, Helen Wood, and Nikki Grahame.
Week 6	Entrances	On Day 32, Brian Belo, from Season 8, Helen Wood, from Season 15, and Nikki Grahame, from Season 7, entered the "Timebomb Bunker" as Time Warp Housemates with fake evicted housemate, Marc.
Week 6	Tasks	On Day 33, the housemates were given questions they thought were from the viewers, however they were actually asked by Brian, Helen, Marc and Nikki in the Timebomb Bunker. The Time Warp housemates then took over the Diary Room giving Harry Amelia, Nick and Sam further interrogation.; On Day 35, to help decide their next nominate, the Time Warp housemates interviewed the other housemates asking them questions about their time in the house so far.; On Day 36, housemates were split into two teams, the red team which featured Brian, Danny, Jack, Jade, Nikki and Sam, was captained by Marc went against Helen's blue team which included Chloe, Cristian, Harry Amelia, Joel, Nick and Simon. Each team had to send one member at a time to a sticky pit to collect a pocket watch whilst being showered with disgusting things. At the end of the task, the blue team had collected the most pocket watches and were therefore rewarded with luxury picnic.; On Day 37, the housemates took part in their next shopping task, "Let's Do The Time Warp" where housemates were asked to freeze when Big Brother activated his Time Warp machine. During this time, familiar faces returned to the house including ex-housemates. (see House guests) The task continued into Day 38 where the Housemates were told they'd passed the task.; On Day 38, the housemates were given the opportunity to get revenge on the Time Warp Housemates. They were given quotes about each other and were asked to guess which of the Time Warp housemates said it about them by pouring a bucket of gloop on the housemate they believe is the correct answer.
Week 6	Nominations	On Day 34, Marc returned to the house with Time Warp housemates Brian, Helen and Nikki. Upon arriving in the house, Big Brother told the other housemates that they would be the ones nominating this week. They chose to nominate Harry Amelia. On Day 35, they nominated Chloe. On Day 36, they nominated Cristian. On Day 37, they nominated Jade, meaning that Chloe, Cristian, Harry Amelia and Jade faced the public vote.
Week 6	Exits	On Day 39, Jade was evicted from the house, receiving the most votes to evict.
Week 7	Entrances	On Day 44, Aisleyne Horgan-Wallace, from Season 7, became the fourth Time Warp Housemate to enter the House.
Week 7	Twists	On Day 39, shortly after Jade's eviction, Big Brother announced that "Time Warp" week had been paused, meaning that the Time Warp housemates; Brian, Helen and Nikki were to remain in the House until further notice. This also meant that Marc continued to be a Time Warp housemate.
Week 7	Tasks	On Day 41, for Nick's birthday, Harry Amelia and Nikki were asked to compete for his affections throughout the day in order for him to decide who should be his guest of honour at his birthday party. He chose Harry Amelia meaning Nikki had to become the waitress for the party.; On Day 42, Sam was set a secret mission to brighten the nominated Housemates spirits by giving each of them a motivational speech and a hug. However, unbeknownst to Sam, the real secret mission was for the nominated Housemates to rebuff Sam's advances and tell her that she has actually made them feel worse. Sam failed to cheer any Housemates up or gain any hugs and therefore passed the task, meaning the nominated Housemates were rewarded with a picnic in the garden.; On Day 44, the Housemates took part in their next shopping task "A Year In A Day". The day began with New Year's Day, then moved onto Valentine's Day where Cristian had to go on dates with Chloe, Danny, Sam, and Simon, and answer questions correctly about each date. For Halloween, Helen, Jack, and Nikki were given a choice of three Tweets about them and had to guess which of them was genuine, and collect them by putting their head into a spooky box, blindfolded. Finally, for Christmas Day Housemates were delivered a gift from Santa's little helper; the fourth Time Warp Housemate Aisleyne. She had to choose which Housemates she wanted to deliver basic rations or a luxury budget to, for the week. She chose to give Chloe, Cristian, Danny, Harry Amelia, Jack, Nick, and Sam a luxury food budget, meaning Helen, Joel, Marc, and Simon received basic rations.
Week 7	Punishments	On Day 42, as punishment for Housemates sleeping during the day, Big Brother removed all duvets, pillows and cushions from the House.; On Day 43, as punishment for Housemates food fighting in the store room and disobeying Big Brother's calls to stop the previous night, they had to partake in Big Brother's "Community Service". With hi-vis jackets and litter pickers, Housemates had to tidy the garden, which had been filled with rubbish by Big Brother. After they had finished, the garden was re-filled with rubbish and Housemates had to continue to clean until the whole garden was tidy.; On Day 44, Helen and Marc both received formal warnings for using offensive language towards Brian.; On Day 46, Danny received a formal warning for using aggressive behaviour towards Marc.
Week 7	Nominations	This week was nomination tag. If a housemate receives a nomination, they are automatically put up for eviction, and will then have to choose another to join them. That housemate must then select another, and so on. This began and Jade decided to nominate Cristian after her eviction. As Time Warp week was put on pause, Marc was immune from this process. Jade nominated Cristian, Cristian nominated Sam, Sam nominated Harry Amelia, Harry Amelia nominated Simon, Simon nominated Jack, Jack nominated Joel, Joel nominated Danny, and Danny nominated Nick, meaning every housemate, besides Chloe and Marc, faced the public vote.
Week 7	Exits	On Day 43, Brian walked from the house.; On Day 46, Simon was evicted from the house, receiving the most votes to evict.; On Day 46, Helen and Nikki left the house.
Week 8	Tasks	On Day 47, the housemates voted Marc and Sam as the two most selfish housemates, therefore they had to spend as much time as possible in an "80's Hell" room and were told that the longer they spent in the room the longer they would enjoy an "80's Heaven" in an 80's themed party. Unbeknownst to them though, the other housemates were already enjoying the party. The pair had to endure tasks such as dancing to the "Birdie Song" on a loop and winding tape into old cassette tapes.; On Day 49, the Big Brother house was turned into a Hotel. In this task, six housemates had to become the members of the Big Brother Hotel staff, whilst three housemates, plus Time Warp Housemate Aisleyne would become their guests. As a VIP, Aisleyne had to choose which three housemates would join her in luxury. She chose Chloe, Danny, and Joel meaning Cristian, Harry, Jack, Marc, Nick and Sam became the staff. If the staff get good ratings from the guests then the whole house will be rewarded with a luxury shopping budget. John McCririck and Charley Uchea were the first guests to enter the house, and departed on Day 50 where they were replaced by Dexter Koh and Jasmine Lennard. Dexter left the house the following day but Jasmine remained where she was joined by James Jordan. On his arrival he decided to make Marc a guest and swap him with Aisleyne, making her staff. Jasmine and James both departed on Day 52 when the task came to an end. Big Brother then revealed that housemates had failed the task.; On Day 53, Aisleyne was given a "Know Yourself" task where she interviewed the housemates and gave them positive feedback and advice for their remaining time in the house.
Week 8	Nominations	The housemates nominated for the fourth time. Harry Amelia, Jack, Marc and Sam received the most nominations and faced the public vote.
Week 8	Exits	On Day 53, Aisleyne left the house.; On Day 53, Marc was evicted from the house, receiving the most votes to evict.
Week 9: Cash Bomb Week	Tasks	On Day 56, the housemates began their next shopping task "Cash Back" where they were faced with a number of opportunities to raise the prize fund. It began with Harry Amelia and Nick signing a restraining order, meaning they could not communicate until further notice, then Cristian, Chloe and Jack eating hot chilies. Later that day, the housemates were tempted with takeaway food, then had to answer questions correctly based on public perception.; On Day 57, the housemates took part in an endurance task in order to win mystery amounts of cash which was secretly allocated by Chloe, and were given the opportunity to buy back their suitcases which were previously lost as punishment.; On Day 59, the housemates were given a number of tweets and had to guess which ones were about them. However they did not know that Danny was responsible for writing half of them. As he remained undetected as the Twitter Troll, he earned £5,000 towards the prize fund.
Week 9: Cash Bomb Week	Twists	On Day 54, Cash Bomb week began where the overall prize fund would be put at risk. Housemates took part in Cash Bomb nominations. When the prize fund began to drop, Housemates had to race to press the button to stop the countdown, this would then earn them immunity. This came at a price however as they then had to nominate another Housemate face-to-face who would automatically face eviction. Over the course of the week, Housemates faced a number of tasks and dilemmas to earn and spend the prize fund cash.; On Day 58, Chloe, Jack, Joel and Sam were each offered £5,000 to take for themselves or to add to the prize fund. The remaining four had to guess what they thought each would do. Danny and Nick failed to predict that Chloe and Sam would take the money for themselves, Joel decided to add the money to the prize fund, and Harry Amelia correctly guessed that Jack would take the money therefore stole it and also decided to add it to the prize fund.; On Day 60, following Harry Amelia's eviction, the housemates were told that they had to evict a second housemate. The three remaining nominated housemates picked from one of three envelopes which had 1 of 3 amounts of money which would be added to the prize money in the event of the holders eviction. Jack had £1,000, Chloe had £10,000, Sam has £15,000. The house evicted Sam and £15,000 was added to the prize money.
Week 9: Cash Bomb Week	Punishments	On Day 54, as punishment for talking during Cash Bomb nominations, the prize fund dropped by £85,700. Also that day, for breaking into the camera runs, the Housemates had to give up all of their personal belongings.
Week 9: Cash Bomb Week	Nominations	This week was "Cash Bomb Nominations". The housemates had to win immunity and the ability to choose one other housemate to face eviction by pressing a button whenever the prize fund started to decrease. Cristian, Danny, Joel and Sam all pressed the button. They nominated Nick, Harry Amelia, Sam and Jack, respectively. The nominated housemates then had to bid money from the prize fund with the highest bidder saving themselves and being replaced by Chloe, the only eligible housemate. Nick placed the highest bid and saved himself from eviction, and instead Chloe was nominated.
Week 9: Cash Bomb Week	Exits	On Day 60, Harry Amelia was evicted from the house, receiving the most votes to evict.; On Day 60, Sam was evicted from the house. (see Twists)
Week 10	Exits	On Day 66, Cristian left the house in sixth place, Nick left the house in fifth place, Jack left the house in fourth place and Danny left the house in third place. It was then revealed that Chloe was the winner, leaving Joel as the runner-up.

== Cash Bomb ==
On 29 June 2015, it was confirmed that there would be a "Cash Bomb" twist for the penultimate week, although exact details were not revealed. On Day 53, following Marc's eviction, Emma announced that as part of the twist, the £150,000 prize fund would be put at risk.

Remaining	Reason	+/–
£150,000	—N/a	—N/a
£134,100	Housemates had to race to press a button to stop the cash countdown – in doing so, they won immunity, but had to nominate another	–£15,900
£48,400	Punishment for talking during nominations	–£85,700
£45,900	Joel purchased a pizza from Big Brother	–£2,500
£45,900	Jack negotiated for football scores, a fitting suit and Um Bongo but later changed his mind	~~–£4,000~~
£40,900	Nick bidded the highest to save himself from eviction – although doing so resulted in Chloe facing eviction instead	–£5,000
£45,900	Sam's "WIN" ball in the tombola earned the Housemates £5,000, however, they missed out on a further £20,000 by choosing letters from home rather than the cash	+£5,000
£46,100	Harry Amelia and Nick signed a restraining order meaning they could not communicate or be in the same room until further notice	+£200
£48,200	Chloe, Cristian and Jack competed in a task to eat a hot chilli. Cristian earned £2,000, Chloe earned £95 whilst Jack bagged £5	+£2,100
£48,300	Housemates resisted takeaway food	+£100
£51,300	Housemates correctly guessed answers from a viewer voted poll	+£3,000
£51,100	The Housemates had a chance to buy back their suitcases in an auction, only Jack and Sam took advantage paying £100 each	–£200
£72,100	An endurance task where Housemates had to raise a money bag in the air with mystery amounts inside. Chloe had secretly allocated amounts to each Housemate's bag based on who she thought would last the longest. Staying over the given time, Cristian earned £10,000, Danny added £6,000 whilst Sam earned £5,000	+£21,000
£82,100	Chloe, Jack, Joel and Sam were each offered £5,000 to take for themselves or to add to the prize fund. The remaining four had to guess what they thought each would do. Danny and Nick failed to predict that Chloe and Sam would take the money for themselves, Joel decided to add the money to the prize fund, and Harry Amelia correctly guessed that Jack would take the money therefore stole it and also decided to add it to the prize fund.	+£10,000
£87,100	Danny remaining undetected in the Twitter Troll task meaning he added to the prize fund	+£5,000
£102,100	Following Harry Amelia's eviction, the three remaining nominated Housemates each had to choose an envelope containing an amount of cash. The other Housemates then had to evict one of these, with the evicted Housemate adding their allocated amount of money to the overall prize fund. They evicted Sam and therefore added £15,000.	+£15,000
£102,100	The Housemates earned £23,900 across the day from doing the Conga, Jack getting five spray tans, Danny spelling "Canoe", and all Housemates answering questions correctly from a viewer based poll. However, Big Brother then told the Housemates that they would have an opportunity to steal the £23,900 before it gets added to the prize fund. They all had a minute to press a button to steal the cash, with the fastest taking it home. If none of them pressed within the time limit the money would be added to the prize fund. Jack pressed the button first therefore stole the money.	~~+£23,900~~
£116,100	After Jack took the money, Big Brother made Jack solely responsible for adding to it again for the final time. He took part in five different tasks including being submerged in sewage, receiving seven more spray tans and shaving a strip in his hair. By successfully competing all the challenges, he earned £14,000 towards the prize fund leaving the overall full amount at £116,100.	+£14,000

== Production ==
The theme of the series was Timebomb, with show bosses explaining that "with Big Brother playing with the concept of time, the tasks, secret missions and twists promise to have tension, drama and intrigue. Time may be a friend or an enemy and for some it may well run out." Emma Willis teased the new theme, stating that "days will turn into nights, time will stop, rewind and tasks will get turned on their heads."

=== Eye logo ===
The official eye logo was unveiled by Channel 5 on 29 April 2015. The eye has a gold metallic structure with a pulsating centre, coinciding with the theme of the series. Lucozade became the new sponsor for the show having previously sponsored the programme on Channel 4 during the tenth series.

=== House ===
The Big Brother house was totally revamped for the new series, developing a sophisticated and sleek 'Mad Men' 60s-style theme. Official house pictures were released on 5 May 2015. The kitchen was gold and had a 60's vibe to it; the living room was in the centre of the house and featured a large orange circular seating area to replicate the Big Brother eye; the bedroom was situated next to the living room and had four double beds and six single beds, and there was also a large dressing room and vanity mirror with a large table; the bathroom was coated in dark wood with a rocky glass shower and large bath with an aquatic wall; the garden went for a copper look with an outdoor seating area and a large glass door which leads into the main part of the house – the pool is also considerably larger than previous series', and is situated on its own island; the garden extends up a flight of stairs to a recreational 'sky room', similar to Big Brother 14's treehouse and Big Brother 15's pod.

Pictures of the diary room were unveiled on 11 May 2015, a day before the launch of the series. The egg-shaped chair has a red leather seating, cradled by a gold exterior. The wallpaper on either side of the room each resemble a clock face to replicate the interior of the Elizabeth Tower in London.

== Ratings ==
Official ratings are taken from BARB.

	Viewers (millions)									
	Week 1		Week 2	Week 3	Week 4	Week 5	Week 6	Week 7	Week 8	Week 9
Saturday		0.91	0.81	0.98	0.84	1	1.28	1.18	1.17	1.04
Sunday		1.25	1.11	1.37	1.26	1.43	1.2	1.33	1.2	1.07
Monday		1.37	1.08	1.36	1.36	1.44	1.27	1.34	1.24	1.31
Tuesday	1.95	1.27	1.2	1.45	1.35	1.45	1.36	1.47	1.38	1.28
Wednesday	1.39	1.32	1.13	1.33	1.34	1.22	1.45	1.14	1.43	1.28
Thursday	1.44	1.23	1.36	1.19	1.29	1.19	1.33	1.28	1.24	1.38
Friday	1.46	1.27	1.24	1.37	1.34	1.26	1.35	1.28	1.36	
Weekly average	1.35		1.13	1.29	1.25	1.28	1.32	1.29	1.29	1.23
Running average	1.35		1.27	1.27	1.27	1.27	1.28	1.28	1.28	1.28
Series average	1.28									
