= Brian Belo =

English entertainer and TV personality

- Born: Brian Belo; 10 July 1987 (age 39); Dulwich, London, England
- Occupations: Reality TV star; columnist; actor
- Years active: 2007–2018
- Television: Big Brother UK; Harry Hill's TV Burp

Brian Belo (born 10 July 1987) is an English reality television star, actor and columnist. He is best known for winning the eighth series of Big Brother UK. He was also a featured regular on Harry Hill's TV Burp.

== Big Brother UK ==
In 2007, Belo entered the eighth series of Big Brother UK, as a late entrant, arriving on Day 17, where he went on to win the show with 60% of the public vote, becoming the first black housemate to win and the youngest, until 2018, housemate to win the series. During his time in the Big Brother house he was noted for his apparent ignorance with regard to William Shakespeare, claiming he had never heard of the playwright. He also notably feuded with fellow housemate, Charley Uchea. After winning the show he became a regular panelist on Big Brother after show, Big Brother's Big Mouth.

In 2008, Belo returned to Big Brother, as a hijacker for a day in the spin-off series Big Brother: Celebrity Hijack.

In 2009, he returned as a guest in the tenth series of Big Brother UK, a part of the Big Brother UK tenth anniversary celebrations.

In 2012, when Big Brother, moved to Channel 5, he began appearing regularly as a panelist on after show, Big Brother's Bit on the Side.

In 2015, Belo returned in the sixteenth series of Big Brother, for two weeks as a "Time Warp Housemate" alongside former housemates; Aisleyne Horgan-Wallace, Helen Wood and Nikki Grahame. Belo clashed with fellow Time Warp Housemate Helen Wood. Wood branded him a psycho, comparing him to a murderer and telling him that he looked like a rapist, this led to Belo climbing over the Big Brother house wall, quitting the show, Wood received a formal and final warning for the incident. The incident between Belo and Wood caused over 2,000 Ofcom complaints, which launched an official Ofcom investigation.

== Other work ==
Within a month of leaving the Big Brother house, Belo made his stage debut as the Guardian Angel in The Vegemite Tales, opposite Blair McDonough and Jonathan Dutton, at The Venue off Leicester Square. He also made a cameo appearance in an episode of Hollyoaks. He performed segments of Shakespeare's plays as part of Stratford-Upon-Avon's Shakespeare's Aloud initiative in March 2008. In October of that year, he played himself in the television series, Dead Set.

In 2008, he released a single titled, Essex Boy, which failed to chart.

Belo became a regular on the ITV comedy series Harry Hill's TV Burp, where he gave his thoughts on the week's television. Alongside Harry Hill, he sang, "Ebony. And. Ivory. Side by Side by the piano keyboard. Oh Lord, why don't we..." and Harry would spray him with a stinger. In 2011, Belo was a contestant on Celebrity Coach Trip alongside former ex-housemate Spencer Smith, they finished in second place. He has made numerous other television appearances including; Celebrity Juice, 8 out of 10 Cats, The Weakest Link, Snog, Marry, Avoid?, Come Dine With Me, Celebrity Total Wipeout and Pointless Celebrities.

From June 2009, onwards, Belo became a columnist for Heat Magazine's website, reporting on Big Brother.

== Personal life ==
In 2012, Belo sued the producers of The Only Way Is Essex, claiming they had stolen his idea for the show, which Belo had pitched to them titled Totally Essex. The matter was settled in November 2013.

== Filmography ==
Film and television
Year	Title	Role	Notes
2007	Big Brother UK series 8	Self; housemate	Winner, 78 episodes
2007	TMi	Self; guest	1 episode
2007	Screenwipe	Self; guest	1 episode
2007	Hollyoaks	Cameo	1 episode
2007	Wannabe with Chanelle	Self; friend of Chanelle Hayes	1 episode
2007	The National Television Awards 2007	Self; audience member	TV special
2007	Big Fat Quiz of the Year	Self; contestant	TV special
2008-2010	Big Brother's Big Mouth	Self; regular panelist	22 episodes
2008-2011	Celebrity Juice	Self; guest	2 episode
2008-2011	8 out of 10 Cats	Self; guest	3 episodes
2008	The Weakest Link	Self; contestant	1 episode
2008	Harry Hill's TV Burp	Self; series regular	8 episodes
2008	Big Brother: Celebrity Hijack	Self; hijacker	1 episode
2008	Dead Set	Brian Belo	5 episodes
2009	The Justin Lee Collins Show	Self; guest	1 episode
2009	Big Brother UK series 10	Self; ex-housemate	1 episode
2009	Big Brother's Big Quiz	Self; ex-housemate	TV special
2009	Big Brother: A Decade In The Headlines	Self; ex-housemate	Documentary
2010	Popatron	Self; guest	6 episodes
2010	Xposé	Self; guest	1 episode
2010	Snog, Marry, Avoid?	Self; contestant	1 episode
2010	Big Brother's Big Award Show	Self; ex-housemate	TV special
2010	The 5 O'Clock Show	Self; guest	1 episode
2010	Come Dine With Me	Self; contestant	1 episode
2010	Davina McCall: Comedy Roast	Self; comedian	TV special
2011	24 Hour Panel People	Self; panelist	1 episode
2011	The Silent Library	Self; contestant	1 episode
2011	The Gadget Show	Self; guest	3 episodes
2011	Celebrity Total Wipeout	Self; contestant	1 episode
2011	Celebrity Coach Trip series 2	Self; contestant	2nd place,
2012	Celebrity Bedlam	Self; guest	1 episode
2012-2015	Big Brother's Bit on the Side	Self; regular panelist	9 episodes
2013	Fake Reaction	Self; guest	2 episodes
2015	Safeword	Self; contestant	1 episode
2015	Big Brother UK series 16	Self; houseguest	11 episodes
2016	8 out of 10 Cats Does Countdown	Self; contestant	2 episodes
2018	Pointless Celebrities	Self; contestant	1 episode
