= Aisleyne Horgan-Wallace =

English television personality, model, actress and columnist

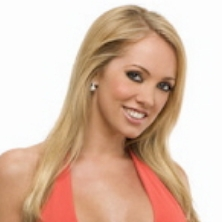
- Horgan-Wallace in 2007
- Born: 28 December 1978 (age 47); London, England
- Education: London College of Fashion
- Occupations: Model; magazine columnist; television personality; actress
- Television: Big Brother; Celebrity Coach Trip; The Challenge UK

Aisleyne Horgan-Wallace (/æʃˈliːn/ ash-LEEN; born 28 December 1978) is an English reality television star, media personality, broadcaster and columnist. She is best known for her appearance on seventh series of Big Brother UK.

== Television career ==
In 2006, Horgan-Wallace entered the seventh series of Big Brother UK, as a late entrant arriving on day 12, alongside fellow housemate Sam Brodie. This series of Big Brother was the third most watched in history with an average of 4.7 million viewers per episode. She became well known for her catchphrase; "you better know yourself" and for her rivalry with fellow housemates; Grace Adams-Short, Lea Walker and Nikki Grahame - she later became close friends with Grahame until her death in 2021. On Day 44, she was voted into the "House Next Door" by the public, a secret room, unknown to the other contestants, where she lived with five new housemates and had to choose four of them to enter the official Big Brother house. She reached the final and ultimately placed third overall with 22.0% of the public vote.

After her appearance on Big Brother, she made multiple appearances on different television shows such as; Big Brother's Big Mouth, Big Brother's Little Brother, Charlie Brooker's Screenwipe, Test the Nation, The Charlotte Church Show, The Friday Night Project, The Gadget Show and The Kevin Bishop Show. In December 2007 she appeared in multiple episodes of the Red TV reality television series; Celebrity Stars at Work, following this Horgan-Wallace signed a one-series contract with Red TV to film a self titled, four episode, fly-on-the-wall documentary. The documentary series titled Aisleyne, began airing on 5 March 2008. In 2009 she appeared on an episode of BBC Three reality television series; Snog, Marry, Avoid? That same year she was interviewed by Grace Dent, for the Channel 4 documentary; Big Brother: A Decade in the Headlines.

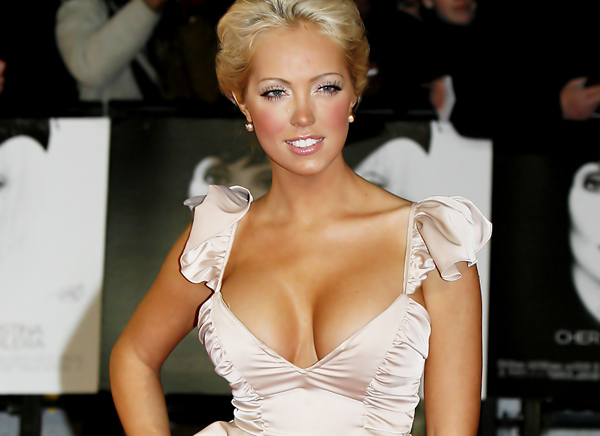
Horgan-Wallace at a red carpet event in 2012

In August 2010, Horgan-Wallace turned down an offer to compete as a housemate in Ultimate Big Brother in order to finish shooting her scenes for a minor role in the British comedy film, Anuvahood. Anuvahood was released in the United Kingdom on the 18 March 2011, but was not a success. She continued to appear in multiple reality television shows including; Wedding TV's Celebrity Hens and Stags and TV3 reality television series Celebrity Salon, finishing runner up behind television presenter Alan Hughes. In 2012 she was a contestant on the third series of Celebrity Coach Trip, alongside fellow ex Big Brother UK housemate Nikki Grahame.

In 2015, Horgan-Wallace appeared as a claimant on the ITV daytime court show; Judge Rinder, in a case against her fellow ex Big Brother UK housemate Michael Cheshire, alleging an unpaid debt, she won her case. She then went on to appear on the sixteenth series of Big Brother UK as a "Time Warp Housemate" alongside ex housemates; Brian Belo, Helen Wood and Nikki Grahame. During her time in the Big Brother house she became involved in a rivalry with fellow Time Warp Housemate, Helen Wood. She became a regular panelist on Big Brother after show - Big Brother's Bit on the Side. On the September 22 2015 episode, Horgan-Wallace appeared as a panelist and got in to a heated argument with evicted Celebrity Big Brother housemate Farrah Abraham. The show was taken off air ten minutes early after a physical altercation between Abraham and Horgan-Wallace. Abraham and Janice Dickinson were given police cautions and Horgan-Wallace was to face trial on charges of common assault and criminal damage, but according to the Daily Mirror, on 29 January 2016 the Crown Prosecution Service dropped all charges. After her appearance she appeared on the Channel 5 reality television show; Celebrity Botched Up Bodies, regarding her dental veneers.

Since 2017 Horgan-Wallace has become a regular guest on ITV morning show; Good Morning Britain. She also appeared on Channel 4's First Dates, then a week later she appeared on BBC2's Brexit Blind Dates, in which opposing voices in the Brexit debate met for dinner. Horgan-Wallace a support of "leave" debated the issue with Labour peer Professor The Lord Winston for "Remain". In 2020 she appeared on MTV UK's Celebrity Ex in the City and in 2023 she was a contestant on the first series of The Challenge UK.

== Other work ==
Horgan-Wallace began her career as an actress, in 2006 she had a cameo role in the film Rollin' with the Nines. After her appearance on Big Brother UK she cameoed in Channel 4's horror series, Dead Set, playing herself. She also played the role of Jasmine in British independent horror film; Serial Killer.

She began working as a columnist discussing Big Brother, for The Sun Online. She also wrote a weekly column covering Big Brother for Reveal magazine, for the eighth, ninth and tenth series of the show. She worked as an agony aunt for More magazine. She also began hosting a show for the online radio station Invincible in 2008 and was a regular guest commentator on BBC's Asian Network radio. In 2009 she co-hosted a radio show on SMUC Radio with Eamonn McCrystal. In 2019 she became a recurring guest on BBC Radio 5 Live's 10 o'clock show, hosted by Sarah Brett and Rick Edwards. In 2011 she was a guest judge in the Miss Universe Ireland beauty contest in Dublin.

In March 2014, Horgan-Wallace launched her own celebrity boot camp named Aisleyne's Booty Camp based in a Country House near Grantham, Lincolnshire.

Horgan-Wallace is a patron of Brain Tumour UK and acted as an ambassador for Club4Climate, an initiative based around parties in London's West End and elsewhere that aimed to prevent climate change. In 2007, she completed a London 10 kilometre run to raise money for Brain Tumour UK; she completed the same event on 6 July 2008. She has also been involved with the National Health Service 'Stop Smoking' campaign in association with Cancer Research UK, and has given her support to No Smoking Day each year since 2008. She also became involved in the "Put the Knives and Guns Down!" campaign, aimed at encouraging teenagers to get off the streets and stop shootings and stabbings.

== Personal life ==
Horgan-Wallace was friends with British musician Amy Winehouse. Kelly Osbourne was critical of Horgan-Wallace and other friends of Winehouse for talking to the press after her death.

It was announced on 24 April 2008 that Mainstream Publishing had bought the right to publish her autobiography, entitled Aisleyne: Surviving Guns, Gangs and Glamour.

In May 2022, Horgan-Wallace, alongside friend Nicola McLean were mugged on a night out. In April 2022, she crashed a go-kart, landing on her head leaving her almost paralysed. In 2025, she claimed she almost died after taking a fake weight-loss jab.

== Filmography ==
Film and television
Year	Title	Role	Notes
2006	Rollin' with the Nines	Clubber	Uncredited
2006	Big Brother UK series 7	Self; housemate	3rd place, 96 episodes
2006	Big Brother Uncut	Self; housemate	22 episodes
2006	Big Brother's Big Mouth	Self; ex-housemate	2 episodes
2006	Big Brother's Little Brother	Self; ex-housemate	10 episodes
2006	T4	Self; guest presenter	1 episode
2006	The Friday Night Project	Self; guest	2 episodes
2006	The Gadget Show	Self; guest	1 episode
2006	The Charlotte Church Show	Self; guest	1 episode
2007	Charlie Brooker's Screenwipe	Self; guest	4 episodes
2007	Deadline	Self; guest	3 episodes
2007	Sky News: Sunrise	Self; guest	1 episode
2007	Test the Nation: The National IQ Test 2007	Self; contestant	1 episode
2007	Celebrity Stars at Work	Self; cast member	3 episodes
2008	Aisleyne	Self; feature	Documentary, 4 episodes
2008	The Kevin Bishop Show	Self; guest	1 episode
2008	The Culture Show	Self; guest	1 episode
2008	The Most Annoying Couples We Love to Hate	Self; commentator	TV special
2008	Dead Set	Aisleyne Horgan-Wallace	2 episodes
2009	Snog, Marry, Avoid?	Self; contestant	1 episode
2009	Big Brother: A Decade in the Headlines	Self; ex-housemate	Documentary
2009	BBC News	Self; guest	1 episode
2010	Afternoon: Live with Kay Burley	Self; guest	1 episode
2010	Sunday Morning Live	Self; guest	1 episode
2010	8 out of 10 Cats	Self; guest	1 episode
2010	Ultimate Big Brother	Self; ex-housemate	2 episodes
2010	BBC Breakfast	Self; guest	1 episode
2011	This Morning	Self; guest	3 episodes
2011	Anuvahood	Maria	
2011	Celebrity Hens & Stags	Self; celebrity hostess	1 episode
2011	Celebrity Salon	Self; contestant	6 episodes
2011	Ireland: AM	Self; guest	1 episode
2011	The Saturday Night Show	Self; guest	1 episode
2012	Celebrity Coach Trip series 3	Self; contestant	9th place, 3 episodes
2012	Looser Women Live	Self; panelist	8 episodes
2013	Come Again	Self; guest	2 episodes
2013	Daybreak	Self; guest	1 episode
2014	What's the Score?	Cameo	
2014	Serial Killer	Jasmine	
2015	Judge Rinder	Self; claimant	1 episode
2015	Big Brother UK series 16	Self; houseguest	10 episodes
2015	Big Brother's Bit on the Side	Self; ex-housemate	27 episodes
2015	Big Brother's Countdown	Self; ex-housemate	4 episodes
2015	Fired by Mum & Dad	Self; cast member	1 episode
2015	Britain's Flashiest Families	Self; feature	2 episodes
2016	Celebrity Botched Up Bodies	Self; botched celebrity	1 episode
2017	When Celebrity Goes Horribly Wrong	Self; commentator	TV special
2017	When Reality TV Goes Horribly Wrong	Self; commentator	TV special
2017	Greatest Celebrity Windups Ever	Self; commentator	TV special
2018	First Dates	Self; contestant	1 episode
2018	Brexit Blind Date	Self; contestant	1 episode
2018	Victoria Derbyshire	Self; guest	2 episodes
2019	Britain's Got More Talent	Self; audience reaction	1 episode
2019	Just Tattoo of Us	Self; contestant	1 episode
2020	Big Brother: Best Shows Ever	Self; ex-housemate	Documentary, 1 episode
2020	Celebrity Ex in the City	Self; ex	1 episode
2022	Vanessa Feltz Drivetime	Self; guest	1 episode
2022	Mark Dolan Tonight	Self; guest	19 episodes
2023	The Challenge UK	Self; contestant	16th place, 1 episode
2023	Lee Anderson's Real World	Self; guest	1 episode
2023	Good Afternoon Britain	Self; guest	1 episode
2023	Big Brother: Late & Live	Self: ex-housemate	1 episode
2024	Nana Akua	Self; guest	1 episode
