= Princess Nikki =

British television series

- Starring: Nikki Grahame
- Opening theme: "Hey Nikki"
- Country of origin: United Kingdom
- Original language: English
- No. of series: 1
- No. of episodes: 6

Production
- Running time: 30 minutes

Original release
- Network: E4
- Release: 6 September – 11 October 2006

Princess Nikki is a reality television series that stars former Big Brother 7 housemate Nikki Grahame. It ran on Wednesday nights between 10:00 - 10:30pm on E4 from 6 September 2006, for a total runtime of 30 minutes. The show was devised by Endemol, the company that also devised Big Brother. It was narrated by the presenter and comedian, Alex Zane.

The format saw Grahame attempt several jobs, including various unpleasant tasks such as rubbish collecting, deep sea fishing, and waste management. The premise of the series was to see whether or not Grahame would perform the tasks given to her and keep her job for a day, or whether she would quit or be sacked due to her infamous tantrums. The concept of the series was taken from one of the tasks Grahame undertook while in the Big Brother House, in which she was assigned as Big Brother's personal assistant and had to carry out various duties, which often resulted in her throwing a tantrum and refusing to comply.

Contrary to rumours after the airing of the first series, a second series was never planned; creative director Philip Edgar-Jones later confirmed that the series was finished.

== Episodes ==
=== Episode 1 "Fisherwoman" (6 September 2006) ===
The first episode involved Nikki entering the fishing industry. She spent a day on the English Channel catching and gutting fish, and then returned to land to work in a fish and chips shop in nearby Folkestone. At the end of the show, her employers commented on her performance, enthusiasm, etc. The person who worked on the fishing boat praised Nikki for not leaving, but complained that she didn't actually do any work. Her fish and chips shop employer seemed to show obvious dislike for Nikki by calling her a Diva, a child, and stroppy (and suggesting she not be given any jobs that require thinking). This episode was watched by 530,001 individuals on average.

=== Episode 2 "Farmer" (13 September 2006) ===
In the second episode, Nikki was sent to Andrew Fuller's farm in Gloucestershire to assist as a farm hand. Her duties included cleaning a pig pen, tending the farm animals, and performing a rectal examination on a pregnant cow, which she screamed at and refused to do after the animal farted in her face. She later went to assist a butcher where she made sausages, and visited the shop's abattoir. Once again, Nikki failed to make a good impression on her employers with Andrew Fuller commenting that the only way he would employ Nikki is if she paid him. This episode had an overnight rating of 308,700 viewers.

=== Episode 3 "Waste Management Officer" (20 September 2006) ===
The third episode of the series had a 'waste' theme. Nikki was initially sent to work as refuse operative (dustman), collecting people's rubbish from the streets of west London. After two hours of working the streets, Nikki managed to lift only five bags of garbage. Nikki was then sent to assist a colon hydro therapist, to perform a colonic irrigation on one of her customers. Nikki didn't act very professionally and burst into laughter several times during the therapy. She was eventually asked to leave. Nikki's final job of the day was to work at a sewage works in Chelmsford, where she was forced to scrape old tampons, human excrement and condoms off a huge sewage plant roller. Again, Nikki failed to impress her employers with one of the binmen exclaiming "She’s on Anne Robinson tonight! She’s the fucking weakest link." This episode was watched by 343,001 individuals on average.

=== Episode 4 "Zoo Keeper" (27 September 2006) ===
This episode had an animal theme. Nikki was originally sent to work as a kennel maid at a dog kennel. Here she was made to clean out dog faeces from each kennel, before churning up the excrement in a blender for disposal. That part went well. She also groomed the dogs, but threw a tantrum when dog hair went up her nose, and then refused to finish her tasks. She later went to work as a zoo keeper at Bristol Zoo. Here she cleaned an Okapi pen, handled rats, and dressed as a seal in order to coax visitors to attend the seal feeding. Nikki managed to infuriate her bosses at the zoo by screaming loudly on several occasions. She was eventually prohibited from working with the animals as her screaming was deemed to be too upsetting for the animals, and she was removed. This episode had an overnight rating of 179,001 viewers.

=== Episode 5 "Mountain Rescuer" (4 October 2006) ===
This episode had an outdoor theme. First, Nikki was sent to the Lake District to help a mountain rescue team "rescue" a woman who had broken her leg (it was an actress for training purposes). She threw a tantrum when climbing out of the boat to shore as the leader of the team shoved her for her petulance. Nikki was more concerned about getting a tissue to blow her nose than helping the woman in distress. She then abseiled down the side of a small cliff, which she said was the activity she had enjoyed most in the series to date. Nikki was then coached in surviving outdoors by survival expert, Chris Caine. He showed her how to build a simple outdoor home made of trees and branches, how to dig a hole in the ground for a toilet, and how to fish. The instructor was easily annoyed by Nikki's behaviour, leading to the usual tantrums and arguments from her. This episode had an overnight rating of 236,000 viewers.

=== Episode 6 "Rugby Player" (11 October 2006) ===
In the final episode, Nikki visited the Harlequin Ladies Rugby team. Here she was made to train and play rugby with the women. It started off well enough, but then the team was instructed to roll around on the cold damp grass; she didn't. She saw one player go into a large container of iced water, in order to cool her muscles after the strenuous exercise. Eventually, the others dunked her into the bath, which Nikki didn't appreciate (describing the rugby players as "butch"). Her final assignment was to assist some environmental health contractors in cleaning a filthy, vermin-ridden house. Here she was made to remove maggots and cockroaches from the house, before cleaning a bath full of festering sewage. Nikki spent most of her time screaming and crying, although she did eventually manage to complete the tasks given to her.

At the end of the episode, Nikki was asked to summarise and reflect on her employment experiences, commenting: "I thought, when I got this series, that I would get nice jobs that would help me learn how to do a working day like you help me, learn about different trades and, give me, ideas what I can chose as a career, but it's been ghastly."

This episode had an overnight rating of 167,100 viewers .
