= Celebrity Coach Trip series 2 =

Celebrity Coach Trip
- Season 2
- No. of days: 10
- Winners: Gary Cockerill & Phil Turner

Release
- Original network: Channel 4
- Original release: 10 October – 21 October 2011

Additional information
- Filming dates: 9 April – 23 April 2011

Series chronology
- ← Previous; Series 1 Next → Series 3

Celebrity Coach Trip 2 was the second celebrity series of Coach Trip which aired from 10–21 October 2011. The series featured a variety of celebrity couples on a 10-day tour, the couples get to vote off the other couples that they do not get along with. On the last day of the coach trip the remaining couples vote for the couple that they want to win the £1000 prize for charity. This coach trip had a journey around the Mediterranean, with the starting location and pick up point in Paris, France, and the first destination was Monaco.

== Voting System ==
The Voting system on this series was:

Days 1 to 5 was a yellow card
Days 6 to 9 an automatic red card

== Contestants ==
Couple were aboard the coach	Couple got yellow carded
Couple won a prize at the vote	Couple got red carded
Couple were immune from votes	Couple banned from the vote

Couple	Trip duration (days)									
Couple	1	2	3	4	5	6	7	8	9	10
Gary and Phil (original 5)										Winners
Brian and Spencer (original 5)										Runners-up
Stavros and Wagner (replaced ? and ?)	Not on coach									Third
Helen and Sandra (replaced John and Jenny)	Not on coach									Fourth
Andrea and Stan (replaced Maurice and Michael)	Not on coach								Red card	Eliminated 5th
Emma and Lizzie (original 5)							Red card	Eliminated 4th		
Maurice and Michael (original 5)						Red card	Eliminated 3rd			
Jenny and John (replaced Alex and Lembit)	Not on coach				Red card	Eliminated 2nd				
Alex and Lembit (original 5)	Yellow card	Red card	Eliminated 1st							

== Celebrity Voting History ==
Indicates that the couple received the most votes and received a yellow card
Indicates that the couple received the most votes and were red carded off the trip
Indicates that it was the couple's first vote meaning they could not be voted for
Indicates that the couple were voted as the most popular couple and won series
Indicates that the couple were voted as the second most popular couple
Indicates that the couple were voted as the third most popular couple

	Day									
	1	2	3	4	5	6	7	8	9	10
Gary; Phil										Winners votes
Brian; Spencer										
Emma; Lizzie										
Maurice; Michael										
Jenny; John	Not on coach									
Andrea; Stan	Not on coach									
Helen; Sandra	Not on coach									
Stavros; Wagner	Not on coach									
Alex; Lembit			Red carded (Day 2)							
Walked	None									
Voted Off	Alex; Lembit ? Votes	Alex; Lembit ? Votes								

== The trip by day ==
=== Arrival Day and Day 1 (10 October 2011) ===
Location: Monaco (Paris pick up point)
Morning Activity:
Afternoon Activity:

=== Day 2 (11 October 2011) ===
Location: Isola
Morning Activity: Snowboarding
Afternoon Activity:

=== Day 3 (12 October 2011) ===
Location: Cannes
Morning Activity:
Afternoon Activity:

=== Day 4 (13 October 2011) ===
Location: Hyères
Morning Activity: Sea kayaking
Afternoon Activity: Zoo trip

=== Day 5 (14 October 2011) ===
Location: Ajaccio
Morning Activity: Horse riding
Afternoon Activity:

=== Day 6 (17 October 2011) ===
Location: Corte
Morning Activity: White-water rafting
Afternoon Activity: Ravine zip-wiring

=== Day 7 (18 October 2011) ===
Location: Livorno
Morning Activity:
Afternoon Activity:

=== Day 8 (19 October 2011) ===
Location: Florence
Morning Activity:
Afternoon Activity:

=== Day 9 (20 October 2011) ===
Location: Verona
Morning Activity: Juliet's balcony
Afternoon Activity: Opera lesson

=== Day 10 and The Last Day (21 October 2011) ===
Location: Orvieto
Morning Activity: Pizza making
Afternoon Activity: Segway tour around Rome
