= Nikki Grahame =

English television personality and author (1982–2021)

- Grahame in 2009
- Born: Nicola Rachele-Beth Grahame; 28 April 1982; Northwood, London, England
- Died: 9 April 2021 (aged 38); Stanmore, London, England
- Education: Northwood School, London
- Occupations: Television personality; author
- Years active: 2003–2021
- Height: 5 ft 1 in (155 cm)

Nicola Rachele-Beth "Nikki" Grahame (28 April 1982 – 9 April 2021) was an English television personality and author. She was a contestant on the seventh series of the reality show Big Brother in 2006, which she finished in fifth place. Following the show, she starred in her own reality series Princess Nikki, and won a National Television Award for Most Popular TV Contender. In 2010, Grahame was runner-up in Ultimate Big Brother, and in 2015, she appeared as a guest housemate on the sixteenth series of Big Brother. In 2016, she competed in the fourth season of Big Brother Canada, finishing in sixth place.

Grahame suffered from anorexia nervosa throughout her life. She released the books Dying to Be Thin (2009) and Fragile (2012), both of which are based on her experiences with the illness. Grahame died from complications of the eating disorder on 9 April 2021, aged 38.

== Early life ==
Nicola Rachel-Beth Grahame was born on 28 April 1982 in Northwood, London, England. She described her early childhood as the "happiest ever" Grahame attended Northwood School, London.

== Career ==
=== 2003–2005: Early media appearances ===
Before Grahame appeared on Big Brother, she appeared as an extra in the BBC One soap opera EastEnders and played a footballer's wife in Sky One's Dream Team. In 2003, she was a contestant on the ITV dating show Blind Date. Grahame, who had earned an NVQ in beauty therapy, took part in the 2004 Miss Hertfordshire pageant, where she came fourth.

=== 2006: Big Brother 7 ===
In May 2006, Grahame registered as a contestant on the seventh series of the Channel 4 reality television series Big Brother, in which she became known for her behaviour such as temper tantrums, Diary Room theatrics, and becoming romantically linked to Pete Bennett, the winner of the series. During her Big Brother tenure, tabloid newspapers reported Grahame had suffered from anorexia nervosa for most of her adolescence and several times had attempted suicide by taking an overdose of paracetamol. Media criticised the programme's decision to include a contestant with prior mental health issues; experts said she should not have been allowed to take part. However, Grahame herself admitted in her autobiography that she intentionally withheld her diagnoses and psychiatric history from the Big Brother team, and only admitted the truth when she was already in the House and struggling.

During her first stay in the Big Brother house, Grahame was nominated for eviction four times and was eventually evicted on Day 58 after gaining 37.2% of the public vote. Less than four weeks after her exit, she and three other ex-housemates were voted into the "House Next Door" by 63% of the voting public. The remaining contestants chose Grahame to return to the main house, although she had already been evicted. Grahame was reinstated as an eligible housemate and was again given the opportunity to receive the show's £100,000 prize; prompting 2,700 viewers to complain to the premium-rate telephone watchdog ICSTIS.

After she was nominated for eviction by Susie Verrico, who had just moved into the house, Grahame furiously shouted in the Diary Room, "Who is she?! Who is she?! Who is she?! Where did you find her?". The outburst became an iconic moment in the show's history.

Grahame finished the show in fifth place with 6.5% of the final vote. The crowd response was less positive than it had been at her prior eviction, when she departed to unanimous chanting and cheers. Host Davina McCall attempted to interview Grahame but she was reluctant to speak, saying she was scared and shocked by the booing from the crowd. Grahame's live interview was cut short and she was led off the stage.

=== 2007–2009: After Big Brother 7 ===
After leaving the Big Brother House, Grahame presented the "Celebrity Spotting" section on one episode of The Friday Night Project that was normally presented by Debra Stephenson. Grahame has also co-presented several episodes of Celebrity Soup, alongside Iain Lee on the satellite channel E! Entertainment Television.

After her first eviction, a reality television series similar to Simple Life in which Grahame would star was announced. The programme followed her attempts to hold an everyday job and was inspired by her unsuccessful stint as a personal assistant in a Big Brother task. Princess Nikki premiered on E4 on 6 September and ran for six weeks.

Grahame made personal appearances, which included participation in various television shows such as Celebrity Scissorhands and 8 out of 10 Cats, and appearances at student nights and clubs. On 24 March 2007, Grahame appeared on a special "Goodies and Baddies" edition of the game show The Weakest Link. During round three, she was the strongest link of the team (answered the most questions correctly and earned the most money), but was eliminated in round five after then becoming the weakest link of the team. Grahame took part in the Soccer Six charity tournament at Wrexham's Racecourse Ground in May 2007.

In June 2007, Grahame returned to the Big Brother franchise as a reporter for the spin-off show Big Brother's Little Brother. Known as "The B-Team", Grahame and several other former housemates were sent to interview people about their opinions of Big Brother 8. She also wrote a Big Brother column in the magazine OK!. In September 2007, Grahame was given a regular column in OK!'s "Hot Stars" section.

=== 2010: Ultimate Big Brother ===
On 24 August 2010, Grahame competed in Ultimate Big Brother, in which she was the only housemate to represent Big Brother 7. Grahame was nominated for a double eviction in the second week of the show's run alongside five of her housemates. Grahame survived the public vote after polling fewer votes than at least two of the other nominees. On 10 September, Grahame became the show's runner-up, receiving a positive reaction from the audience after losing to Big Brother 2 winner Brian Dowling in the final vote. Grahame finished the show three places higher than her placing in Big Brother 7.

During Grahame's time in Ultimate Big Brother, she appeared to be more comfortable discussing her anorexia; in particular, she conversed with Vanessa Feltz, who has also had problems with her weight.

=== 2015–2021: Big Brother Canada 4 and final projects ===
In 2015, Grahame participated in the sixteenth series of Big Brother as a "time warp housemate". In September 2015, she collaborated with JYY London to design a range of fashion garments for petite women. In an interview with Reveal magazine, Grahame stated:

I've been on buying trips and been designing a lot of things myself. From the very start I said I wanted to be really hands on, from picking fabrics to designing labels and I feel like I've succeeded. I'm excited that it's a petite collection because sizing is always something I struggle with.

On 23 February 2016, Grahame was announced as one of four 'international wildcards' representing Big Brother UK who could be voted into the Big Brother Canada house via an online vote. Following the series' first eviction on 3 March 2016, it was revealed Grahame, along with Tim Dormer, the winner of the tenth series of Big Brother Australia, had been voted into the house. They both became immune from eviction for that week. On 14 April, Grahame was voted in the top two Canadian choices to become the Head of Household (HoH) for the week but she lost a competition to fellow house guests Nick & Phil Paquette. On 24 April, HoH Cassandra nominated Grahame for eviction as a "pawn" to evict a bigger target. On 28 April, she survived this eviction attempt when Jared Kesler was evicted in a 3:1 eviction vote. In a double-eviction twist, however, Grahame was again nominated for eviction alongside Dormer by the HoHs Nick and Phil. Dormer was vetoed off the block and was replaced by Joel Lefevre. Grahame then became the tenth house guest to be evicted in a 3:0 eviction vote and received a standing ovation from the studio audience. Grahame was evicted on Day 63, her 34th birthday. As a result of her eviction, Grahame was the fifth member of the nine-person jury who decided the season's winner on Finale Night. She, along with six other jurors, voted for Nick and Phil to be the winners of the series.

In August 2017, Grahame appeared on the Channel 5 documentary "In Therapy", which aired on 3 August 2017. The programme features Grahame in intensive, on-camera therapy sessions with psychotherapist Mandy Saligari, during which Grahame spoke about her depression and anorexia.

Grahame often appeared on the panel of Big Brother's Bit on the Side. In 2017, Grahame was a special guest at the Big Brother Canada awards. In 2018, Grahame entered the Big Brother house for the final time. Speaking about it being the last series, Grahame said:

There is something about this house where nothing else matters. Big Brother has played such a huge part of my life, it changed my life for the better. I don't have one regret, not one. It will always have a place in my heart. Thank you Big Brother for everything. Literally, everything.

== Illness and death ==
Grahame developed an eating disorder that resulted in her parents having her admitted to the children's eating disorders unit at the Maudsley psychiatric hospital. She was an in-patient for six weeks but after her release, she resumed under-eating and several months later, she was rushed to an emergency unit at Hillingdon Hospital, where she was force-fed through a nasal tube. She was then transferred to Collingham Gardens child and family psychiatric unit in west London, where her weight was increased. After eight months, she was allowed to return home. For 18 months, Grahame remained at home and attended Northwood secondary school in Hillingdon, west London, before she started losing weight again. She was readmitted to Collingham Gardens, where she stayed for six months, and was then taken to Great Ormond Street Hospital, where she was placed on a psychiatric and eating disorders ward.

Grahame refused to willingly accept treatment and commented; "I was on a mission to starve myself to death ... I was obsessed". This culminated in several suicide bids. At the age of twelve, she stole a packet of paracetamol tablets from the hospital's supplies and swallowed some. Shortly after, her weight drastically dropped and she fell into a coma; at one stage, her doctors predicted she was minutes from death. After this incident, Grahame was force-fed through a tube that was stitched inside her stomach but when she regained consciousness, she continuously tried to remove the feeding apparatus.

Grahame was eventually admitted to Rhodes Farm, an eating disorders clinic in Mill Hill, North London, and after six months, she began showing signs of improvement. She commented; "I woke up one morning and thought, 'What are you doing to yourself?' " At the age of 16, her weight had increased and she was released from the clinic. Grahame relapsed when she was 18, and spent time in an adult eating disorder ward. In the process of overcoming her eating disorder, she developed obsessive–compulsive disorder involving a chronic fear of germs.

At the age of 18, Grahame was given wrongly given breast implants on the National Health Service because her anorexia had left her flat-chested. She had to pay for this procedure. In April 2007, Grahame said she had undergone corrective plastic surgery on her breast implants to fix "ripples" left by the first operation.

In October 2011, Grahame confirmed she had relapsed and was again suffering from anorexia, stating she had checked into her 11th institution. In 2012, Grahame was sectioned following an overdose.

In March 2021, Grahame's family announced she had again relapsed, that she "constantly feels weak and is struggling on a day to day basis", and that she wanted to recover but felt it was "impossible". They opened a GoFundMe fundraiser to pay for private treatment because the National Health Service (NHS) treatments had "failed". The family said they had "exhausted every avenue possible" and raised over £60,000 for Grahame's treatment. On 24 March, following a fall Grahame entered Dorset County Hospital, where she remained until she was discharged on 8 April. The next day, she was found dead in her Stanmore flat; she had died from complications of anorexia nervosa at the age of 38. She had been due to enter a private facility in Devon to receive specialist treatment the following week. At the time of her death, Grahame weighed less than 30 kg (66 lb).

The week following Grahame's death, her GoFundMe page was re-opened to raise money for her funeral and for eating disorder charities.

=== Reactions and tributes ===
Following Grahame's death, friends and celebrities paid tribute, including actress Gemma Oaten, presenters Davina McCall , Arisa Cox, Paddy McGuinness, and Rylan Clark-Neal, drag queen Cheryl Hole, Big Brother narrator Marcus Bentley, media personality Katie Price, actor Daniel Brocklebank, singer Joe McElderry, television personality Bobby Norris, television presenter and Ultimate Big Brother cast mate Vanessa Feltz, and former Big Brother housemates Aisleyne Horgan-Wallace, Imogen Thomas, Glyn Wise, and winner of their series Pete Bennett.

Channel 4 and Big Brother Canada would also pay tribute to Grahame via Twitter and at the start of episode 18 of Big Brother Canada 9.

== Filmography ==
Year	Show	Role	Notes
2003	EastEnders	Extra	
2003	Dream Team	Footballer's Wife	Minor role
2003	Blind Date	Contestant	1 episode
2006	Big Brother UK 7	Contestant	Originally Evicted Day 58, Returned Day 83, Finished in 5th place
2006	Princess Nikki	Herself	Lead role; one series
2006	The Jeremy Kyle Show	Herself	1 episode
2006	Big Brother Uncut	Herself	
2006	The Friday Night Project	Guest Presenter	1 episode
2006, 2009, 2010	TMi	Herself	3 episodes
2006–2020	This Morning	Herself	Guest; 6 episodes
2007	8 Out of 10 Cats: Big Brother Special	Guest Panellist	1 episode
2007	Weakest Link	Contestant	Celebrity special, 1 episode
2007	Celebrity Soup	Guest Co-presenter	3 episodes
2007–2010	Big Brother's Little Brother	Panellist	
2007–2009	Big Brother's Big Mouth	Panellist	
2008	Balls of Steel	Herself	1 episode
2008	CelebAir	Herself	1 episode
2008	Supersize vs Superskinny	Herself	1 episode
2008	Celebrity Juice	Herself	Guest; 1 episode
2010	Ultimate Big Brother	Contestant	Finished in 2nd place
2011–2018	Big Brother's Bit on the Side	Panellist	
2011–2018	Celebrity Big Brother's Bit on the Side	Panellist	
2012	Celebrity Coach Trip	Herself	Paired with Aisleyne; eliminated first
2015	Big Brother	Guest Housemate	16th series
2015	The Family Outing	Nina	Film
2015	Pointless Celebrities	Contestant	1 episode
2016	Big Brother Canada 4	Contestant	Finished in 6th place
2016	Loose Women	Herself	Guest; 1 episode
2017	In Therapy	Herself	1 episode
2018	The Story of Reality TV	Herself	Television documentary
2019	Britain's Got More Talent	Herself	1 episode, with Aisleyne
2020	Big Brother: Best Shows Ever	Herself	Guest appearance
2022	Nikki Grahame: Who Is She?	Subject	Channel 4 documentary documenting Grahame's life and battle with anorexia

== Awards ==
Year	Award	Category	Result
2006	National Television Awards	Most Popular TV Contender	Won

== Books ==
- 2009: Dying to Be Thin (autobiography)
- 2012: Fragile (autobiography)
