= Sam Evans (television personality) =

British Big Brother contestant

- Born: Llanelli, Wales, United Kingdom
- Occupations: Reality TV star, footballer, activist
- Years active: 2013–present
- Television: Big Brother UK, Deal or no Deal

Sam Evans is a British reality television star, footballer and disability activist from Llanelli, Wales. He is best known for winning the fourteenth series of Big Brother UK.

== Television career ==
In 2012 Evans was a contestant on the daytime game show Deal or No Deal. He won £7,000 and week's holiday for two in Egypt.

In 2013 Evans entered the fourteenth series of Big Brother UK, which he won. Evans was the second Welsh housemate to win the series after series nine winner, Rachel Rice. Evans was the third disabled housemate in Big Brother UK history, as he was born with 70-80% hearing loss. He won the show on day 68 winning the £100,000 cash prize, after his victory he announced he intended to return to work in his original job as a stock assistant at Debenhams. After his appearance on Big Brother, he became a regular guest on Big Brother after show; Big Brother's Bit on the Side.

In 2014 Evans took part in the S4C reality television series, Cariad@iaith:love4language, learning to speak the Welsh language, alongside other Welsh celebrities.

== Football career ==
Evans began to play in the Deaf Champions League for London based St John's Deaf FC. In 2024 the team placed fourth places in the finals. He played for Wales, competing at the 2024 European Deaf Football Championships in Turkey. He officially became the captain of the Wales Deaf Football team in 2024.

He currently helps coach Deaf children in Wales to play Football.

== Personal life ==
Evans is a disability activist, mainly for deaf people, he was born with 70-80% of hearing loss. In 2015 he visited Malawi to help build audiology services for deaf children in need, he also helped to raise money for the charity.

== Filmography ==
Film and television
Year	Title	Role	Notes
2012	Deal or no Deal	Self; contestant	Winner
2013	Big Brother UK series 14	Self; housemate	Winner, 69 episodes
2013	Big Brother's Bit on the Psych	Self; ex-housemate	8 episodes
2013-2014	Big Brother's Bit on the Side	Self; ex-housemate	Recurring role, 36 episodes
2014	Cariad@iaith:love4language	Self; contestant	9 episodes
2015	Breakfast Live Malawi	Self; guest	1 episode
2016	First Love	Zach	Short film
