= Christian Howes (presenter) =

English presenter (born 1973)

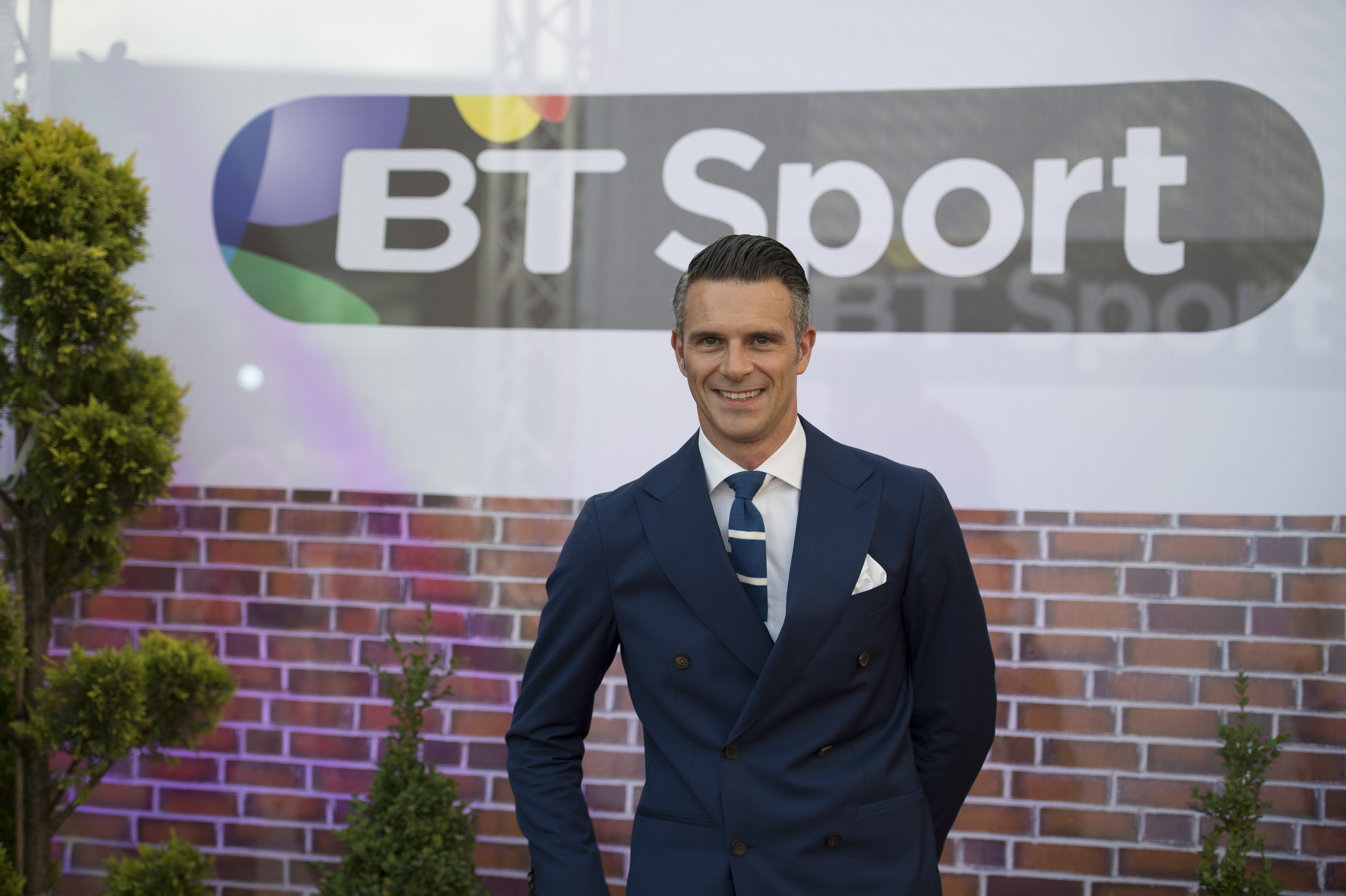
- Howes at the BT Sport Launch
- Born: 16 January 1973 (age 53); Hampshire, England
- Occupation: Presenter
- Years active: 2009–present
- Employer(s): BT Sport, ITV
- Television: Bit on the Side; The National Lottery Draws; This Morning; BT Sports Panel; The Clare Balding Show; BT Sport Live

Christian Howes (born 16 January 1973) is a public speaker and English television social media pundit, best known for working on the Big Brother spin-off show Bit on the Side, providing a weekly update with Emma Willis.

== Television ==
=== Big Brother's Bit on the Side ===
For Big Brother 12, Howes provided a weekly update on the sofa with Emma Willis. Christian analyses social media data and creates visualisations to provide content and discussion around what television audiences think of programmes and shows.

Howes continued his analysis role in Big Brother 13 in 2012. He also wrote a blog for the Big Brother website and Facebook page. Howes has also blogged for the fansite BBSpy.

=== BT Sport ===
From 1 August 2013, Howes will appear on three shows each week; including The Clare Balding Show, BT Sports Panel and BT Sport Live on Mondays and Fridays.

=== This Morning ===
In 2013, Christian appeared three times a week on This Morning Summer providing analysis for the viewers at home, of the topics that were discussed in show.

=== Other work ===
Howes has also started to do the same analysis for the National Lottery and appeared on EuroMillions shows alongside O.J. Borg on 18 May 2012 and Matt Johnson on 20 July 2012 And more recently appeared on Channel4's alternative election night in 2015

He has also used the same social data to analyse public opinion to world events.
