= Big Brother (British TV series) series 14 =

Coordinates: 51°39′23″N 0°16′02″W

Big Brother
- Series 14
- Series fourteen logo
- Presented by: Emma Willis
- No. of days: 68
- No. of housemates: 14
- Winner: Sam Evans
- Runner-up: Dexter Koh
- Companion shows: Big Brother's Bit on the Side
- No. of episodes: 69

Release
- Original network: Channel 5
- Original release: 13 June – 19 August 2013

Series chronology
- ← Previous; Series 13 Next → Series 15

Big Brother 2013, also known as Big Brother 14 and Big Brother: Secrets and Lies, is the fourteenth series of the British reality television series Big Brother. It launched on 13 June 2013 on Channel 5 and 5*, and lasted for 68 days, ending on 19 August 2013. It was part of a new two-year contract with Endemol, which secured the show until 2014. It was the third regular series to air on Channel 5 and the seventh series of Big Brother to air on the channel since they acquired the show. The series was won by 23-year-old Sam Evans from Llanelli. He won the full £100,000 prize fund, making him the first winner since 2010 to do so.

Eight housemates entered on launch night, including a set of twins becoming one housemate; with another six, including a mother and daughter, entering the house the following night. Unbeknownst to the housemates, an actor controlled by the viewers, Michael Dylan - otherwise known as "The People's Puppet" - entered the house on launch night, and this was revealed to them upon his departure on Day 9. On Day 33, after a confrontation between housemates Daley Ojuederie and Hazel O'Sullivan, Daley became the first housemate to be ejected from the Big Brother House since Big Brother moved to Channel 5. For the first time in regular Big Brother history, no new housemates entered the house following the two launch nights.

The fourteenth series saw the return of viewers voting to evict, rather than voting to save alike the two previous series. This way of voting had not been used since Ultimate Big Brother.

This was the first series of Big Brother to be presented by Big Brother's Bit on the Side co-host Emma Willis and the first presenter change since Brian Dowling took over from Davina McCall in 2011. Willis continued to host Bit on the Side along with Rylan Clark and AJ Odudu, who replaced Jamie East and Alice Levine. This season also use some of the game mechanics from the Secret Story franchise.

This is the most watched Channel 5 series of Big Brother UK averaging 1.7 million.

== Format ==
The fourteenth series of Big Brother introduced several changes to the format. One of the changes implemented in the fourteenth series was the return of "Vote to Evict". This way of voting had not been used since Ultimate Big Brother. Another change was Big Brother sometimes revealing the number of nominations each nominee received to the housemates, and it also saw the three or more housemates with the most nominations facing the public vote each week, with the nominated housemate who had the fewest votes to evict after lines had been frozen usually being saved during a live segment in the Wednesday highlights show. Voting lines then reopened. During the live eviction show, for the first time, nominated housemates were given thirty seconds to broadcast a 'plea' explaining why they think they should stay in the house.

== Housemates ==
On Day 1, eight housemates entered the house. The first two housemates, Jack and Joe, entered as a joint housemate. A further six housemates entered on Day 2, including a mother and daughter duo (Charlie & Jackie) competing as two individual housemates.

Dan Neal had appeared in the first series of former reality show Lads' Army in 2002.

Name	Age on entry	Hometown	Day entered	Day exited	Result
Sam Evans	23	Llanelli	1	68	Winner
Dexter Koh	28	London	1	68	Runner-up
Gina Rio	24	London	2	68	3rd place
Jack and Joe Glenny	18	Cheshunt	1	68	4th place
Charlie Travers	26	Berkhamsted	2	68	5th place
Sophie Lawrence	20	London	1	65	Evicted
Hazel O'Sullivan	24	Dublin	2	58	Evicted
Callum Knell	28	Maidstone	1	51	Evicted
Daniel "Dan" Neal	33	London	2	44	Evicted
Jackie Travers	59	Berkhamsted	2	37	Evicted
Daley Ojuederie	28	London	2	33	Ejected
Ainsley "Wolfy" Millington	20	Bolton	1	30	Evicted
Jemima Slade	41	London	1	16	Evicted
Sallie Axl	26	Wallasey	1	9	Evicted

== House guests ==
29-year-old Michael Dylan from Cork entered the house as "The People's Puppet" on Day 1, and was hired by Big Brother as a housemate who was controlled by the viewers. Unlike every other housemate, Michael did not have genuine housemate status and is referred to as a non-housemate or a houseguest – but this was unknown to the housemates. Michael's true identity as "The People's Puppet" was revealed on Day 9, and he then left the house.

Name	Age on entry	Hometown	Day entered	Day exited
Michael Dylan	29	Cork	1	9

== Nominations table ==
	Week 1	Week 2	Week 3	Week 4	Week 5	Week 6	Week 7	Week 8	Week 9	Week 10 Final		Nominations received
Main Housemates
Sam	Not eligible	Dexter, Gina	Dexter, Sophie	Wolfy, Sophie	Dexter, Gina	In Safe; House	Sophie, Dexter	Dexter, Sophie	Dexter, Sophie	Winner (Day 68)		5
Dexter	Nominated	Dan, Jack & Joe	Banned	In Safe; House	Callum, Gina	No nominations	Callum, Jack & Joe	Jack & Joe, Hazel	Jack & Joe, Sam	Runner-up (Day 68)		34
Gina	Nominated	Jemima, Dexter	Hazel, Jackie	In Safe; House	Jackie, Jack & Joe	No nominations	Hazel, Jack & Joe	Hazel, Charlie	Jack & Joe, Charlie	Third place (Day 68)		19
Jack & Joe	Not eligible	Dexter, Gina	Dexter, Gina	Charlie, Wolfy	Dexter, Callum	No nominations	Dexter, Callum	Dexter, Charlie	Charlie, Dexter	Fourth place (Day 68)		12
Charlie	Not eligible	Jemima, Dexter	Dexter, Wolfy	Wolfy, Callum	Callum, Jack & Joe	No nominations	Callum, Jack & Joe	Hazel, Jack & Joe	Jack & Joe, Gina	Fifth place (Day 68)		6
Sophie	Not eligible	Dexter, Gina	Dexter, Sam	Sam, Hazel	Callum, Dexter	In Safe; House	Callum, Hazel	Hazel, Sam	Sam, Dexter	Evicted (Day 65)		6
Hazel	Not eligible	Gina, Dexter	Gina, Dexter	Callum, Wolfy	Gina, Callum	No nominations	Callum, Dexter	Gina, Sophie	Evicted (Day 58)			10
Callum	Not eligible	Jemima, Gina	Dexter, Dan	Wolfy, Hazel	Dexter, Jackie	No nominations	Dexter, Hazel	Evicted (Day 51)				17
Dan	Not eligible	Dexter, Wolfy	Wolfy, Dexter	Wolfy, Callum	Callum, Jack & Joe	In Safe; House	Evicted (Day 44)					4
Jackie	Not eligible	Gina, Dexter	Dexter, Gina	Wolfy, Callum	Gina, Callum	Evicted (Day 37)						3
Daley	Not eligible	Gina, Jemima	Gina, Dexter	Callum, Wolfy	Ejected (Day 33)							0
Wolfy	Not eligible	Dexter, Jemima	Dexter, Dan	Charlie, Dan	Evicted (Day 30)							11
Jemima	Not eligible	Dexter, Gina	Evicted (Day 16)									5
Sallie	Nominated	Evicted (Day 9)										1
People's Puppet
Michael	Gina, Dexter, Sallie	Left (Day 9)										N/A
Notes	1	2	3	4	5	6	7	8	9	10		
Against public vote	Dexter, Gina, Sallie	Dexter, Gina, Jemima	Dan & Wolfy, Dexter & Gina	Callum, Hazel, Jackie, Wolfy	Callum, Dexter, Gina, Jack & Joe, Jackie	Dan, Sam, Sophie	Callum, Dexter, Hazel, Jack & Joe	Charlie, Dexter, Hazel, Jack & Joe, Sophie	Charlie, Jack & Joe, Sam, Sophie	Charlie, Dexter, Gina, Jack & Joe, Sam		
Ejected	none				Daley	none						
Evicted	Sallie; Most votes (out of 2) to evict	Jemima; Most votes (out of 2) to evict	Dexter & Gina; Most votes to move	Wolfy; Most votes (out of 3) to evict	Jackie; Most votes (out of 2) to evict	Dan; Most votes to evict	Callum; Most votes (out of 3) to evict	Hazel; Most votes (out of 2) to evict	Sophie; Most votes (out of 3) to evict	Charlie; Fewest votes (out of 5)	Jack & Joe; Fewest votes (out of 4)	
Evicted	Sallie; Most votes (out of 2) to evict	Jemima; Most votes (out of 2) to evict	Dexter & Gina; Most votes to move	Wolfy; Most votes (out of 3) to evict	Jackie; Most votes (out of 2) to evict	Dan; Most votes to evict	Callum; Most votes (out of 3) to evict	Hazel; Most votes (out of 2) to evict	Sophie; Most votes (out of 3) to evict	Gina; Fewest votes (out of 3)	Dexter; Fewest votes (out of 2)	
Evicted	Sallie; Most votes (out of 2) to evict	Jemima; Most votes (out of 2) to evict	Dexter & Gina; Most votes to move	Wolfy; Most votes (out of 3) to evict	Jackie; Most votes (out of 2) to evict	Dan; Most votes to evict	Callum; Most votes (out of 3) to evict	Hazel; Most votes (out of 2) to evict	Sophie; Most votes (out of 3) to evict	Sam; Most votes to win		

Notes

- ^Note 1: The public decided on "The People's Puppet" Michael's behalf on who would face the first public vote, rather than nominations taking place as normal. The three housemates with the most votes were Gina, Dexter and Sallie and these were as a result Michael's three nominations. The phone lines froze on Day 7, and Michael was told by Big Brother that Dexter had the fewest votes and he therefore saved him from eviction. Voting then resumed for Gina and Sallie. After Sallie's eviction, it was revealed to the housemates that Michael was "The People's Puppet", and he then left the house.
- ^Note 2: The public vote to evict was frozen on Day 14 and Gina was saved, having received the fewest votes. Voting then resumed for Dexter and Jemima.
- ^Note 3: On Day 19, housemates had to nominate face-to-face, live on Channel 5. As punishment for discussing nominations earlier that day, Dexter was banned from nominating. Had Dexter been allowed to nominate, he would have nominated Wolfy and Jackie, meaning Dexter, Gina and Wolfy would have faced the public vote. This week was a "fake double eviction", in which the public voted for who they wanted to move into the Safe House, where the chosen pair would secretly live in luxury watching their fellow housemates' every move. The pairs were pre-selected by their nominations tally so either Dan and Wolfy (tied third) or Dexter and Gina (first and second) were "fake evicted". On Day 23, the two housemates chosen to enter the Safe House were Gina and Dexter.
- ^Note 4: Whilst Dexter and Gina were living in the Safe House, they could not nominate and could not be nominated by their fellow housemates, assuming them to be evicted and also unaware that Dexter and Gina were able to see their nominations. In a twist, Big Brother gave Dexter and Gina the opportunity to save one of the four nominees (who would live alongside them in luxury) and replace them with another housemate. Dexter and Gina chose to save Charlie and replaced her with Jackie.
- ^Note 5: On Day 30, after Wolfy's eviction, the lines opened for two housemates to move into the Safe House, in which they would be immune from the next eviction. The pairs were pre-selected so either Charlie and Dexter, Dan and Gina, Sam and Sophie, Jack and Joe, Daley and Hazel or Callum and Jackie would move into the Safe House. On Day 31, the two housemates chosen to move into the Safe House were Daley and Hazel, however, Daley was ejected from the house on Day 33. Due to Daley's ejection, a planned nominations twist was cancelled and normal nominations took place. As she was living in the Safe House, Hazel could nominate but could not be nominated by her fellow housemates.
- ^Note 6: There were no nominations in Week 6. Unbeknownst to the housemates, the housemates living in the Safe House would automatically face the public vote. Housemates chose Sam & Sophie to live in the Safe House, who were subsequently told that they could choose another housemate to live alongside them. On Day 40, Big Brother lied to the housemates, telling them that those not living in the Safe House were up for eviction. Sam & Sophie chose Dan to live in the Safe House, meaning he also faced the public vote this week.
- ^Note 7: As well as finding out they were nominated, Callum, Dexter, Hazel and Jack & Joe were shown who nominated them.
- ^Note 8: Rather than the housemates nominating this week, housemates' friends and family nominated on their behalf.
- ^Note 9: On Day 60, housemates were tasked with unanimously choosing one person to receive a free pass to the final. However, they failed to reach a consensus, and thus lost the pass. Housemates nominated face-to-face for the second time in a live broadcast on Day 61. On Day 63, following the Prize Fund Lie, Dexter became immune and had to choose one housemate to replace him to face the public vote. He chose Sophie.
- ^Note 10: The public were voting for the housemate they wanted to see win Big Brother.

== Weekly summary ==
Week 1	Entrances	Jack & Joe, Sallie, Jemima, Michael, Callum, Wolfy, Sam, Sophie and Dexter entered the House on Day 1.; Gina, Dan, Hazel, Daley, Charlie and Jackie entered the House on Day 2.
Week 1	Twists	On Day 1, Michael was revealed to the viewers as "The People's Puppet", a special non-Housemate controlled by the outside world.
Week 1	Tasks	On Day 1, Michael, "The People's Puppet" was given his first task, to be the first random housemate to be called into the Diary Room by Big Brother. Big Brother gave Michael Head Housemate status, which gave him the power to choose who would receive their suitcases. He had the option to shred his own suitcase to save everyone else's, or shred everyone else's suitcases to save his own. Michael chose to save his own, leaving everyone else's suitcases to be shredded in front of them in the garden. The housemates were unaware that this was a twist and that their genuine suitcases were still held by Big Brother.; On Day 2, the viewers were given the opportunity to vote for what they think Michael, "The People's Puppet", should do next. Once all six of the remaining housemates entered on Day 2, he was called to the Diary Room by Big Brother who told him that he had another decision to make, in relation to the six housemates who had just entered and their suitcases. Big Brother said that he could have a pizza and a cold beer if he decided to shred their suitcases too. Michael, carrying out what the public wanted, decided to turn down Big Brother's offer; unaware that his fellow housemates were watching.; On Day 3, housemates competed in the 'ABC-crets' task which would earn a meal for them all that night if they successfully guessed one another's secrets by stepping on the appropriate A, B or C circles. Michael's secret, that he left his fiancée the day before their wedding, was selected by the viewers in an online poll beforehand. Housemates did pass the task to earn the meal for the house that night, however, due to Sallie eating one of Michael's Head Housemate-only treats earlier in the day, the housemates did not receive this meal.; On Day 4, Michael secretly left the house to appear on Rylan's Supersized Celebrity Sunday where he was given another secret task. He was given 3 questions (voted for by the viewers) to ask his fellow housemates. These were "If you had the power to evict someone, who would it be?", To Sallie: "Who do you fancy the most?", and "Who is the biggest wannabe?". Michael was successful in his secret task despite Dan becoming suspicious of him.; On Day 5, Charlie and Jackie competed in a task in which they had three minutes to work together (with a 'blind-folded' Charlie being directed by Jackie) to build the word "tension" made up of a series of foam blocks. However, this was not the real task. Charlie received the real task beforehand, which was to make sure her mother lost the end of her tether during the task. As Charlie and Jackie later failed their task and Jackie lost her temper, this meant that Charlie had therefore passed her secret task and won a batch of massage oils for the house.; On Day 6, housemates competed in the first shopping task of the series; 'Stackable Shopping'. In this task, housemates had to work as a team and handle oversized pieces of shopping which were to be stacked to the required 'Pass' line in order for the housemates to earn a luxury shopping budget. Earlier that day however, Michael, "The People's Puppet", was instructed by Big Brother to carry out the wishes of the public once more - by sabotaging the shopping task. Michael was successful in his secret task and this therefore meant that the housemates did not receive a luxury shopping budget.; On Day 7, Big Brother placed a suggestion box in the house and encouraged housemates to share their views about their fellow housemates by placing a suggestion into the suggestion box. These anonymous suggestions were later read out to the house.; On Day 8, in order for Gina and Sallie to win invites to a party, they had to correctly guess which housemates Michael would label into a specific category, such as; "Least Attractive." However, as Michael was "The People's Puppet", he was labelling housemates to these categories in reflect of the viewers' voting. Gina and Sallie correctly guessed six of Michael's choices and therefore won a party for them and six housemates of their choice (Charlie, Dan, Hazel, Wolfy, Jack and Joe and Michael, whose invite was automatic as he was Head Housemate) later that night.
Week 1	Punishments	On Day 3, Gina received a formal warning following a heated argument with Sallie which resulted in Gina aggressively trying to remove Sallie's hat from her head.; On Day 3, the house did not receive the meal won during the 'ABC-crets' task due to Sallie eating one of Michael's Head Housemate-only treats earlier that day.; On Day 4, Jemima received a formal warning for using racial remarks in a conversation about the type of men she goes for. This then resulted in Gina being offended by the comments.
Week 1	Nominations	On Day 5, Michael nominated Dexter, Gina and Sallie for eviction on behalf of the public audience's majority decision.; On Day 7, Dexter was removed from the public vote after receiving the fewest votes to evict at that point. The public vote then continued on with Gina and Sallie.
Week 1	Exits	On Day 9, Sallie was evicted from the house, receiving the most votes to evict.; On Day 9, Michael's true identity as "The People's Puppet" was revealed to the housemates, and he then left the house. After Michael's exit, the housemates who entered on Day 1 still remaining in the house (Jack and Joe, Dexter, Callum, Sophie, Wolfy, Jemima and Sam) learned that their suitcases were not shredded in the first day's task. These housemates could then collect their suitcases.
Week 2	Tasks	On Day 10, housemates took part in the 'Remember To Remember' task in order to win a treat. In this task, housemates were divided into two teams of seven (Blue and Purple Brains) in a challenge of memory. Big Brother had placed in the house beforehand a series of objects which the house thought they would have to memorise for the task, however, it was later revealed that the task would be based on a series of conversations that took place earlier that day. The Blue Brains (consisting of; Charlie, Callum, Jack, Wolfy, Dan, Daley and Sophie) won the task and received some sweet treats later that day.; On Day 12, Jack and Joe were set the task 'Feast Like A Beast' by Big Brother. For the task, Jack and Joe had to successfully impersonate how a selection of animals eat their food. If housemates correctly guessed more than half of Jack and Joe's impersonations correctly, they would win a slap-up meal of their choice, to be delivered to the house later that day.; On Day 13, housemates were set their second weekly shopping task: 'Quarantine.' The task involved housemates being subjected to a fictional viral outbreak. Big Brother provided six gas masks which could save the six housemates who wore them from the infection. The housemates decided that Wolfy, Charlie, Hazel, Daley, Callum and Joe would wear the gas marks, leaving Jack, Jemima, Jackie, Dexter, Dan, Sam, Sophie and Gina to become infected and to enter the Quarantine room, away from the main house. The infected housemates were subjected to Big Brother's attempts at curing the virus, and if they were cured they could return to the main house in preparation for the final part of the task. The housemates would need to pass the final part of the task in order to receive a luxury shopping budget for the week. On Day 14, the housemates passed the final part of the task and earned the shopping they collected in the final part of the task. This task was inspired by Charlie Brooker's Dead Set.; On Day 15, housemates were set a secret task: to successfully hide from Jack and Joe in the store room, without them noticing. The housemates had to go to the store room one-by-one, in alphabetical order. The housemates passed their secret task later that day and earned a treat.; On Day 16, housemates were given a locked box, padlocked by three locks. The housemates were asked a series of questions relating to what they thought of their fellow housemates by Big Brother. Each question answered would earn a housemate the chance to unlock the locked box. However, one of the locks could only be unlocked if they selected the right key. The three housemates who selected the correct keys were Jackie, Wolfy and Gina, and by unlocking the locked box collectively, they all earned the chance to see exclusive footage of their fellow housemates' audition tapes.
Week 2	Punishments	On Day 11, as punishment for discussing nominations, Hazel, Jackie, Joe and Jemima were sent to the jail in the garden.; On Day 14, as punishment for stashing alcohol, Gina was sent to the jail in the garden.
Week 2	Nominations	On Day 11, the housemates nominated for the first time. Dexter, Gina and Jemima received the most nominations and faced the public vote.; On Day 14, Gina was removed from the public vote after receiving the fewest votes to evict at that point. The public vote then continued on with Dexter and Jemima.
Week 2	Exits	On Day 16, Jemima was evicted from the house, receiving the most votes to evict.
Week 3	Tasks	On Day 17, housemates competed in a battle of the sexes task, which saw the boys (Callum, Daley and Dexter) go up against the girls (Gina, Hazel and Sophie). For this task, the respective teams would have to follow the commands of Big Brother for as long as possible. The team who allotted the most time after all three team members of the team had had a turn would win the task. The boys emerged as the winners of the task, and therefore won a 'girls night-in' for all the male housemates later that night.; On Day 18, housemates competed in the 'Last Laugh' task. For this task, each housemate entered the Diary Room one-by-one where they found a 'funny' joke or object inside provided by Big Brother. The housemate who laughed the longest at Big Brother's joke and/or object would win the task. Sam laughed for over 15 minutes and won the task. As a reward, Big Brother gave him and two housemates of his choice a chance to watch Gina, Jackie and Wolfy's audition tapes. He chose Callum and Daley.; On Day 20, housemates began their third weekly shopping task; '5-4-3-2-1'. For this task, every time housemates heard the 5-4-3-2-1 countdown buzzer, they would report to Big Brother and be given a task that they would have to complete before the countdown clock ran out. Each task they successfully completed within the time limit would go towards the amount of money they could spend on the weekly shopping budget. Housemates successfully completed the series of tasks and won 60% of a luxury shopping budget for the week.; On Day 22, Wolfy was set a task in which she had to teach her fellow housemates to talk and gather information from a variety of animals Big Brother had placed in the garden. The other housemates had to use Wolfy's teachings to open up and tell one of the animals a secret. Once each housemate had given the animal a secret to keep, Wolfy then had to try and guess three housemates' secrets that they told to one of the animals. Each secret guessed correctly earned the house a reward. Wolfy guessed one secret correctly and as a reward won ingredients for a fish dinner for the house.; On Day 23, Sophie was told by Big Brother that the viewers had picked her as the housemate they would like to see wear a camera that would capture up-close a series of expressions from her. The rest of the housemates were tasked with trying to get Sophie to deliver these expressions. The housemates later passed the task.
Week 3	Twists	On Day 17, a mysterious tennis ball reading: "Dan is an actor" was found by Dexter in the garden's vegetable patch.
Week 3	Punishments	On Day 19, as punishment for discussing nominations, Dan, Dexter and Gina were sent to the jail in the garden.; On Day 19, as punishment for discussing nominations, Dexter was banned from nominating this week.; On Day 22, as punishment for discussing nominations, Sophie was sent to the jail in the garden.; On Day 22, Dan received a formal warning for using threatening behaviour against Callum.; On Day 23, Dexter received a formal warning for using offensive and inappropriate sexual comments.
Week 3	Nominations	On Day 19, the housemates nominated for the second time. Dan, Dexter, Gina and Wolfy received the most votes and faced the public vote.; On Day 21, Big Brother paired up Dan & Wolfy and Dexter & Gina to face a fake double eviction.
Week 3	Exits	On Day 23, Gina and Dexter were evicted from the house. This was however a fake eviction. Both Gina and Dexter were escorted backstage to be talked to by Big Brother in the Diary Room, before they both entered the Safe House.
Week 4	Tasks	On Day 24, Dexter and Gina were tasked with giving housemates of their choice tasks to fulfil. The housemates however were told by Big Brother that it was a 'viewers take over' day and that these tasks were chosen by the viewers. Gina and Dexter chose to send Daley and Wolfy to the jail in the garden, make Hazel clean the entire house, give Daley a nice lunch and Wolfy a nasty lunch, send Jack & Joe and Sophie to the treehouse to answer a series of questions, and give Dan and Sam afternoon tea. Housemates completed all tasks successfully and as a result won a Chinese takeaway.; On Day 26, housemates were set the task; 'Making Headlines'. Dexter and Gina were called to the Diary Room prior to the task's announcement, and were tasked with matching a series of headlines to the name of a housemate of their choice. Having done this, the other housemates were told to do the same. However, the housemates did not know that they were being tested on how closely they matched Dexter and Gina's answers and that the headlines they had been given were not real. Each headline matched with the name of the correct housemate won the house a watergun and an ice lolly.; On Day 28, housemates began their fourth weekly shopping task; 'The Budget'. As residents of the Safe House, Charlie, Dexter and Gina were made Treasury members and had to make a series of budget cuts and avoid temptation in order to save as much money for the week's shopping budget as possible. Upon completion of the shopping task on Day 29, housemates earned a total of £280 towards their weekly shopping budget.; On Day 30, Dan was set the task of finding out who the house's secret saboteur was for the day. The other housemates were aware of this and that the saboteur was Sam, who was tasked with hiding Dan's toiletries in the vegetable patch and throwing his clothing into the pool. Sam completed these tasks, however, Dan successfully guessed that it was him who was the house's secret saboteur. For guessing correctly, Dan received the use of a variety of gym equipment for one hour. Sam was sent to the jail as punishment for not keeping his identity hidden.
Week 4	Twists	On Day 26, Dexter and Gina were told that they would have the power to save one of the four nominees and replace them with another housemate of their choice. They later chose to save Charlie and replace her with Jackie on Day 27. As Charlie was saved, she joined Dexter and Gina in the secret Safe House.; On Day 27, the Safe House twist was revealed to the other housemates. A hidden pool within the back garden was also unveiled.; On Day 30, it was announced that a new pre-selected duo of housemates would enter as new residents of the Safe House. Ex-residents Charlie, Dexter and Gina were still eligible to re-enter. Voting opened to the public as to which duo would enter the Safe House for its second week. The pairings for possible entry into the Safe House on Day 31 were: Jackie & Callum, Dexter & Charlie, Sam & Sophie, Hazel & Daley, Jack & Joe, or Gina & Dan.
Week 4	Punishments	On Day 26, as punishment for discussing nominations, Jackie, Sam and Sophie were sent to the jail in the garden.; On Day 30, Sam was sent to the jail as punishment for not keeping his identity hidden during the day's task (see tasks).
Week 4	Nominations	On Day 25, the housemates nominated for the third time. As Dexter and Gina were in the Safe House, they were unable to nominate or be nominated. Charlie, Callum, Hazel and Wolfy received the most nominations and faced the public vote.; On Day 26, Dexter and Gina had the power to save one of the nominees and replace them with another housemate. They chose to save Charlie and nominate Jackie in her place.
Week 4	Exits	On Day 24, Jackie broke her arm after slipping and falling on it in the garden. Big Brother arranged for her medical attention and she was escorted to a nearby hospital. Later that day she re-entered the Big Brother House.; On Day 30, Wolfy was evicted from the house, receiving the most votes to evict.
Week 5	Tasks	On Day 32, Safe House residents Hazel and Daley were tasked with becoming 'The Interviewers'; by interviewing their fellow housemates on their time in the house so far. Big Brother provided them with additional information files on their fellow housemates to assist them during this task.; On Day 34, housemates began their fifth weekly shopping task; 'The Remote Control'. For this task, Big Brother placed an oversized remote control in the house. The housemates were instructed to obey all instructions given by the remote control in order to pass the task and obtain a luxury shopping budget for the week. If they went below a pre-determined number of fails, the housemates would fail the weekly task. Big Brother sent in a series of distractions when housemates were carrying out the instructions of obeying the remote control, such as sending in a herd of sheep. On Day 35, housemates discovered that they had passed the task; having incurred 23 fails out of a possible 33. The housemates therefore won a luxury shopping budget for the week.; On Day 36, housemates were set 'The Impassible Task'. For this task, housemates thought they had to solve a dilemma, using a set of mysterious props and puzzles placed in the garden by Big Brother. A meter was placed in the garden to measure how close they were to passing and failing this task. Housemates were told they could come to the Diary Room to voluntarily quit the task at any time. However, housemates were unaware that Callum had been set the real task, which was to keep his fellow housemates trying to solve the dilemma for as long as possible. Callum passed his secret task, meaning the housemates won a game of football to play in the garden.
Week 5	Twists	On Day 31, Hazel and Daley were chosen next to enter the secret Safe House, meaning that they were, among their other privileges, immune from the weekly eviction. Following Daley's ejection on Day 33 (see exits), Hazel was the only housemate to be immune from the weekly eviction.; On Day 34, the housemates found two more tennis balls in the garden that contained supposed messages from the outside world; one of the tennis balls read "Daley has slaughtered Hazel on TV and in the press", whilst the other read "Jackie will go on Friday. It's 100%".; On Day 37, housemates voted for two housemates of their choice to enter the Safe House; thinking that they were to receive the same privileges as in previous weeks. However, this secretly meant that these housemates would actually be up for eviction. Housemates chose Sam and Sophie to enter the Safe House.
Week 5	Punishments	On Day 33, as punishment for discussing nominations, Charlie was sent to the jail in the garden.; On Day 33, Hazel was issued with her first formal warning as a result of intentionally pulling down fellow housemate Daley's underpants.; On Day 37, as punishment for jumping into the pool, Charlie, Callum, Dan and Gina were sent to the jail in the garden.
Week 5	Nominations	On Day 33, the housemates nominated for the fourth time. Callum, Dexter, Gina, Jack & Joe and Jackie received the most nominations and faced the public vote.
Week 5	Exits	On Day 33, Daley was ejected from the house following threatening and aggressive behavior towards Hazel.; On Day 37, Jackie was the fourth housemate to be evicted from the Big Brother House.
Week 6	Tasks	On Day 38, housemates' selfishness was tested in the task; 'Trash for Treats.' In this task, housemates were divided up into pairs, with each member of the pair told that by smashing a glass box in front of them, they would be rewarded with a treat. Big Brother then gave the pairs ten seconds, without discussing with their fellow housemates or each other, a chance to smash their box in order to claim their treat. However, if both members of the pair smashed their glass box, neither would receive their treat. If only one member of the pair smashed their glass box, they would be rewarded with their treat, whilst the losing member of the pair would not receive their treat and instead would head directly to jail. If neither member of the pair smashed their glass box, they would both be rewarded with a much smaller treat.; On Day 40, Big Brother tasked Callum with being the house therapist in the task; 'I'm All Ears.' Across the day, each housemate was told to visit Callum and express any thoughts or troubles to him.; On Day 41, housemates began their sixth weekly shopping task; 'The Right Answer.' For this task, all housemates had to do was give the correct answer to a question asked by Big Brother. Some of the questions asked were influenced by the viewers. Each correct answer would earn the housemates money toward their weekly shopping budget; the total amount in the totaliser at the end of Day 42 would be the total weekly shopping budget for the week. On Day 42, housemates earnt a total shopping budget of £76 for the week. As part of the task, Westlife star Shane Filan shared a conversation with Jack & Joe.; On Day 43, in the task: 'Don't Drop It!' Jack and Joe were asked to hold a series of items by Big Brother, such as a toy duck, for a reward of some pastries for them to share. Dropping any of the items would mean that they failed the task. They later passed their task, having kept their items in hand at all times, and therefore won the pastry reward.; On Day 44, in the task: 'Puntastic Prizes', housemates competed in pairs in a series of tasks and were told by Big Brother that if they as a pair passed their task they would win a 'treat' for the house, such as ten steaks. However, this was a lie; and as a result of passing the task, each pair would earn a worthless or disgusting prize that was another meaning of the word they had thought was a treat, such as letters from home actually meaning lettuce from home.
Week 6	Twists	On Day 40, Safe House residents Sam & Sophie were told to pick one of their fellow housemates to join them in the Safe House. Unbeknown to them and their fellow housemates, the person they chose would join them against the public vote this week. They later chose Dan to enter the Safe House.
Week 6	Nominations	Dan, Sam and Sophie faced the public vote.
Week 6	Exits	On Day 44, Dan was evicted from the house, receiving the most votes to evict.
Week 7	Tasks	On Day 45, housemates were set the 'Express Yourself' task. For this task, each housemate was given some paint and an easel and was told to paint a picture that represented their time in the house. If they were creative enough, they would pass the task and receive their letters from home as a reward. Housemates later passed the task and received their letters from home.; On Day 46, housemates were each set a task to follow one other housemate by Big Brother until further notice in a game of follow the leader. As each housemate successfully followed one another, each of them earned an ice cream.; On Day 47, in the task 'Mechanical Mannequins', housemates were divided into two teams, with each team required to pose for a particular event. Callum, Dexter, Gina and Sam were required to portray a day of fun at the beach, whilst Charlie, Hazel, Jack & Joe and Sophie were tasked with portraying a day in a park. The team that provided the best poses won a takeaway pizza; the team of Callum, Dexter, Gina and Sam won the task. However, as the other team ate the treat too later that evening, this pizza treat was voided for the winners (see punishments).; On Day 48, housemates began their seventh weekly shopping task; 'Nemesis.' For this task, each housemate was paired with their apparent nemesis in the house (i.e. the person they have the least in common with, or do not particularly favour). In their respective pairs, they were made to trash talk each other, and had to report to: 'the protein station', 'the posing station' and 'the exercise station' during the task. If the task was completed successfully, not only would housemates be rewarded with a luxury shopping budget, but, each housemate who won their battle would also receive a personal £20 budget for the week.Housemates earned three quarters of a luxury shopping budget and Callum, Hazel, Jack and Sam each won their own £20 shopping budget in addition to this.; On Day 50, Big Brother set the nominated housemates, Callum, Dexter, Hazel and Jack & Joe, the task of creating a campaign explaining why they should stay, and also creating a campaign to explain to the public why they should evict one of the other nominees over themselves.
Week 7	Punishments	On Day 47, as the losing team of Charlie, Hazel, Jack & Joe and Sophie ate some of the winning team's pizza reward following the day's task, the winning team of Callum, Dexter, Gina and Sam were sent to jail and forbidden to eat the rest of their reward as punishment for not stopping this.
Week 7	Nominations	On Day 46, the housemates nominated for the fifth time. Callum, Dexter, Hazel and Jack & Joe received the most nominations and faced the public vote.
Week 7	Exits	On Day 51, Callum was evicted from the house, receiving the most votes to evict.
Week 8	Tasks	On Day 52, Dexter performed a night of magic and mystery for his fellow housemates as tasked by Big Brother which included three tricks: showcasing his ability to read minds, transforming certain objects (suitcases), and making one housemate disappear (Sam).; On Day 53, Gina was set the task; 'Fake Mail'. For this task, she had to fabricate fan mail for herself and her fellow housemates and as she completed her task successfully, she won a reward.; On Day 54, Sophie was set the task of getting the majority of her fellow housemates to carry out tasks for her, such as giving her a high-five or a makeover. However, she was unaware that the rest of the house had been told of her task and that they had to sabotage her mission by refusing her requests. As the majority of housemates did not refuse Sophie's requests, they failed the task and earned no reward.; On Day 55, Jack and Hazel were sent to a secret area and were given the task of providing running commentary on the events of a day inside the Big Brother House. But, what they were not told of was that the rest of the housemates could hear this. The rest of the house had to pretend that they could and did not hear anything that had been said; in doing so, a reward would be earned. Housemates later passed the task.; On Day 56, Gina was selected to be Queen Bee for this week's shopping task, 'Busy Bees'. As Queen Bee, Gina chose Charlie to join her as Guard Bee. These were in charge of the other housemates, the worker bees, as they had to make jars of honey. To pass the task, they had to follow Gina's instructions and make a specific amount of honey. If Gina was not satisfied with the workers, she could give them all a sharp sting by giving them an electric shock. During the task, Gina was given the chance to make the worker bees work harder by making more jars of honey, by doing this Gina would receive special rewards such as a phonecall from home. The task continued on Day 57 and housemates won £280 towards their shopping budget, however as Hazel refused to wear shock pads, Big Brother deducted £100 from it leaving them with a total of £180 (see punishments).; On Day 58, Charlie was given a secret task. She had to have deep conversations with four of her fellow housemates. As she passed the task, she won beauty products for the group.
Week 8	Punishments	As Hazel refused to wear shock pads as part of this week's shopping task, Big Brother deducted £100 from the total shopping budget.
Week 8	Nominations	This week, the housemates family members nominated instead of the housemates themselves. Charlie, Dexter, Hazel, Jack & Joe and Sophie received the most nominations and faced the public vote.
Week 8	Exits	On Day 52, Gina was escorted to a nearby hospital after complaining of a hurt chest following the 'Nemesis' shopping task undertaken in the previous week. That same day, she returned to the Big Brother House (having been given the all-clear).; On Day 58, Hazel was evicted from the house, receiving the most votes to evict.
Week 9	Tasks	On Day 59, Marcus Bentley entered the house for a task. Instead of commentating on what is happening in the house, he delivered a script and the housemates had to follow his instructions. The housemates passed this task and won a Caribbean BBQ party.; On Day 60, in the task 'Aggy Adjectives', Sophie was tasked with thinking of as many adjectives as she possibly could for the word 'Grumpy'. For every correct adjective she gave, Sophie was rewarded with a treat. However, if Big Brother felt she had not made enough effort, then one item of her clothing would be forfeited. Sophie later passed the task and earned twenty-six treats.; On Day 61, Sam had to perform a night of stand-up comedy for his fellow housemates in the task: 'Sam's LOL Fest.' However, as he was aware, the more the housemates laughed the worse the treat would be. As most of the reception was good and the majority of housemates laughed, Sam won only a small cupcake later that day.; On Day 62, housemates took part in their final shopping task; 'Save the Shopping!'. For this task, housemates became the house's Rescue Squad and had to save their shopping from a series of dangers. The treehouse became Rescue HQ and in pairs, housemates would take it in turns to save their shopping from several dangerous fixtures in the garden, such as 'the burning building' or the 'bomb'. Among the shopping were golden tokens (special prizes) which could also be saved. On Day 63, once the task had finished, the shopping that was saved could be kept.; On Day 64, Gina had to become Big Brother's Best Friend by performing tasks that would assess if she was so or not. Her tasks included: insulting three other housemates' appearances, stealing something, revealing a big secret and who she wants to be evicted, staying away from one of her friends and throwing a strop at random. Gina passed her series of tasks above, and was rewarded with a treat at the end of the day for being a true friend to Big Brother.; On Day 65, in the task 'Gina Of The Lamp', Dexter and Gina became the genies of the Big Brother House for the day with a mission of making each of the evictee's potential last day in the house as comfortable as possible by granting any wishes they so desired. If they failed to carry out any evictee's wishes, they would risk losing the task. Later that day, the genies successfully completed all of the evictee's wishes and passed the task.
Week 9	Twists	On Day 60, housemates voted for the person they wanted to see in the final. It was revealed that the winning housemate (with the most votes) would receive a free pass to the final. However, it would only be given on the condition that the housemates made a unanimous decision.; On Day 63, the four nominated housemates were told that one of them would be leaving the house that night. The nominated housemates each had to choose how much money they would take in exchange from being evicted that day. Sam chose the full £100,000, Charlie chose £99,000, Jack and Joe opted for £96,850, and Dexter said he would leave for the lowest - at £88,800. Housemates were told the housemate who chose the lowest amount of money would be evicted, taking with them the amount of money they had chosen which would be deducted from the prize fund. However, this was a lie and Big Brother told Dexter that as he had been the least selfish housemate, he would be immune from the public vote but had to choose from the two remaining housemates, Sophie and Gina, someone to replace him and face the public vote this week. Dexter chose Sophie.
Week 9	Nominations	On Day 61, the housemates nominated for the seventh and final time. Charlie, Dexter, Jack & Joe and Sam received the most nominations and faced the public vote.; On Day 63, as part of the Prize Fund lie, Dexter became immune and chose Sophie to replace him, meaning Charlie, Jack & Joe, Sam and Sophie faced the public vote.
Week 9	Exits	On Day 65, Sophie was evicted from the house, receiving the most votes to evict.
Week 10	Tasks	On Day 66, housemates took part in the task: 'Big Brother's Press Conference.' For this task, each of the five finalists had to create a speech addressing why they should win the show, and why they deserve to do so. They had to present this speech to the rest of the house, who then had to query what they had said. Housemates also faced tweets from the public, received a phonecall from home, and had delivered to them a series of individually-tailored questions from celebrities including Vanessa Feltz, John McCririck and Sugababes singer Amelle Berrabah and ex-housemates Jemima, Wolfy, Dan, Callum, and Hazel. They all challenged what they had said in their respective speeches.
Week 10	Exits	On Day 68, Charlie left the house in fifth place, Jack & Joe left the house in fourth place and Gina left the house in third place. It was then revealed that Sam was the winner, leaving Dexter as the runner-up.

== Production ==
=== Auditions ===
On 11 December 2012, it was revealed that Big Brother producers had axed all open auditions for Big Brother 14, making this the first series since Big Brother 5 in 2004 to see housemates chosen only from online applications. In order to become a housemate, potential housemates had to record a 90-second video and fill out an online application form.

If bosses liked what they saw, the chosen few would be invited to 'callbacks', which took place in January and February 2013 in London and Manchester. A source said, "With only a few minutes to impress producers, only the best will get into the show this year. There won't be any second chances or opportunities to try again at another open audition. They have just one shot." However, from 13–15 December, "Talent Spotters" from Big Brother visited bars in Blackpool to find new housemates; they also visited Huddersfield on 14 December 2012.

=== Presenters ===
On 13 March 2013, it was reported that Brian Dowling had been removed from presenting Big Brother and that Emma Willis would be taking over. These rumours were confirmed on 2 April. It was also speculated that Rylan Clark would be taking over the role of hosting Big Brother's Bit on the Side after previously winning Celebrity Big Brother 11 in January 2013.

On 17 April, Alice Levine and Jamie East both announced via Twitter that they had left spin-off show Big Brother's Bit on the Side after six series. Clark initially denied he would be hosting the show, but Channel 5 officially confirmed on 14 May that Clark and AJ Odudu would join Willis as presenters of Big Brother's Bit on the Side; and that Willis would continue her Bit on the Side role in addition to taking over as host of the main show. Plus, Big Brother's Bit on the Psych aired on Saturday nights, with Odudu as the sole presenter, and included guests and psychologists examining housemates' behaviour during the week. Clark also hosted a Sunday lunchtime edition of Bit on the Side, called Rylan's Supersized Celebrity Sunday.

=== Eye logo ===
The alternate eye used as part of the Secrets and Lies theme for the series.

An alternate eye logo was officially unveiled on 24 May 2013. The dark eye sported a pupil built entirely of television screens, whilst the rest of the eye consisted of life-sized recycled doors, furniture and white fluorescent lights to coincide with the theme of the series, a stark contrast from the bright colours of the Big Brother 13 eye. The "official" eye logo, which features it on a white background with colour, was revealed on 4 June. Channel 5 admitted that they deliberately "fooled" fans by concealing the eye as a tie-in to the 'Secrets and Lies' theme of the series.

=== House ===
On 5 May 2013, it was reported that the House had been "completely redesigned". On 23 May 2013, it was confirmed that the house would be 'Eco' in design. The series was expected to show the objective of self-sufficiency and recycling throughout and this was represented throughout the house. Inside the house, as housemates entered, they were greeted by a huge wall containing recycled life-sized doors. Behind one of the doors was the Diary Room; a housemate could call to talk to Big Brother in this room from the bottom of the stairs. Inside the Diary Room was a metallic based chair, layered in slim red padding. Outside of the Diary Room, there was a sweeping staircase leading down to an eco-living room with producers desperate to make the housemates experience 'hell in a hell house'. The living room contained different coloured sofas and chairs and a plasma television. Beside the living room, there was a circular style kitchen for housemates to use. The housemates could store their food items and utensils obtained from the adjacent store room in a purpose-built cow. There was a round table for housemates to sit at and eat together at. Beside the living room, there was a small toilet, and the bedroom. The bedroom was colourful in design this year, and introduced a bike which powered the hair dryers and hair straighteners when active. Both the bedroom and the living area led out into the garden. This series, the garden had a barred prison for any housemates that misbehaved, as well as a treehouse for housemates to get cosy in and it included the returning vegetable patch which was last seen in Big Brother 4. Housemates had to shower outside; with one housemate having to spin a wheel that powered the only shower. The traditional mangle also made its return to the house. House pictures were officially unveiled in the Daily Star on 10 June 2013.

==== The Safe House ====
On 19 June 2013 episode of Big Brother's Bit on the Side, rumours arose of a secret bedroom visible in this year's house plan. It had an en suite with baths, a shower and a toilet. On 3 July 2013, it was confirmed that a duo of fake evicted housemates would re-enter a Big Brother House next door called the Safe House. These housemates lived under a lap of luxury and gained immunity from nominations for a whole week. They were allowed to spy on the other housemates with a television and headphones. This is similar to Big Brother 5 and Ultimate Big Brother's bedsit, Big Brother 12's crypt and Celebrity Big Brother 11's luxury basement.

=== Live feed ===
Channel 5 announced on 14 May 2013 that the live feed would be partly reinstated, for two hours per day. Big Brother: Live from the House aired each night from 7–9pm on 5* (except Sundays where only one hour was broadcast from 8–9pm). Live feed was also broadcast on Channel 5 after every live eviction show for 30 minutes, after Big Brother's Bit on the Side, to show how the housemates coped with the results of the weekly eviction. On 26 June 2013, Channel 5 announced that it would axe the nightly live feed on 5*, however, in effect after 30 June. The live feed later made a return online via channel5.com between midnight (11:30pm on Sundays) and 2am daily from 12 July 2013.

=== Teasers ===
On 17 May 2013, a six-second teaser aired on Channel 5 ahead of the new series asking viewers to guess "#whatsthesecret". On 19 May, a second teaser aired which featured two doors that were pink and blue, as well as asking viewers to guess "#whatsthesecret". These teasers led to speculation that the new series could be based on a similar premise to Secret Story, a spin-off format of Big Brother that has been successful worldwide. On 13 June 2013, prior to the launch, Channel 5 published 15 housemate teasers. This led to rumours that there would be sixteen housemates, as one teaser mentioned twin housemates. It was even rumored that a "viewers' puppet" controlled by viewers votes would enter the house.

=== Sponsorship ===
The series sponsor was casino website and TV programme (that airs nightly on Channel 5) SuperCasino. The series also featured product placement from Very.co.uk who supplied products for the house, along with Aquafresh, Weetabix, L'Oréal, Zeo and Levi Roots (on Day 59). Housemates ordered their shopping from online grocery business Ocado, using an iPad, as part of another product placement agreement.

== Ratings and reception ==
=== Television ratings ===
Official ratings were taken from BARB and include Channel 5 +1.

	Viewers (millions)										
	Week 1		Week 2	Week 3	Week 4	Week 5	Week 6	Week 7	Week 8	Week 9	Week 10
Saturday		1.48	1.43	1.16	1.53	1.42	1.83	1.4	1.38	1.35	1.37
Sunday		1.63	1.72	1.56	1.56	1.65	1.86	1.62	1.54	1.48	1.61
Monday		1.83	1.61	1.61	1.73	1.89	1.75	1.92	1.79	1.54	2.2
Monday		1.83	1.61	1.61	1.73	1.89	1.75	1.92	1.79	1.54	1.96
Tuesday		1.65	1.57	1.8	1.64	1.92	1.65	1.88	1.92	1.57	
Wednesday		1.55	1.52	1.64	1.67	1.94	1.69	1.61	1.53	1.38	
Thursday	2.19	1.57	1.63	1.77	1.75	1.79	1.81	1.79	1.92	1.87	
Friday	2.2	2.1	1.72	1.61	1.72	1.82	1.9	1.94	1.86	1.85	
Weekly average	1.8		1.59	1.59	1.66	1.78	1.78	1.74	1.69	1.58	1.79
Running average	1.8		1.71	1.67	1.67	1.69	1.7	1.71	1.71	1.69	1.7
Series average	1.7										

=== Controversy and criticism ===
More than 150 people complained to television watchdog Ofcom after Big Brother issued Jemima Slade a formal warning on Day 4 over her apparent offensive comments towards Gina Rio. Gina took offence to Jemima's comments about her disliking of dating black men and she deemed her to be racist.

On Day 33, Daley became the first housemate to be ejected from the Big Brother House since the show moved to Channel 5. The ejection was due to Daley's threatening behaviour towards Hazel. Channel 5 later chose to broadcast the footage that caused the ejection which showed Daley slap Hazel's behind, clasp her by her throat and pin her down against her bed. This resulted in Ofcom receiving a total of 60 complaints and it was later confirmed that they had launched an investigation. Daley was later banned from appearing on the show's final.

Over 200 complaints were received by Ofcom later on in the series pertaining to an argument which Gina had with Hazel. During the heated argument, Gina described Hazel as a 'skank' and a 'whore', continuously referring back to Hazel's relationship with Daley. Some viewers deemed Gina's actions as a form of bullying.
