= Jeff Kristian =

English actor, writer, singer, recording artist and television presenter

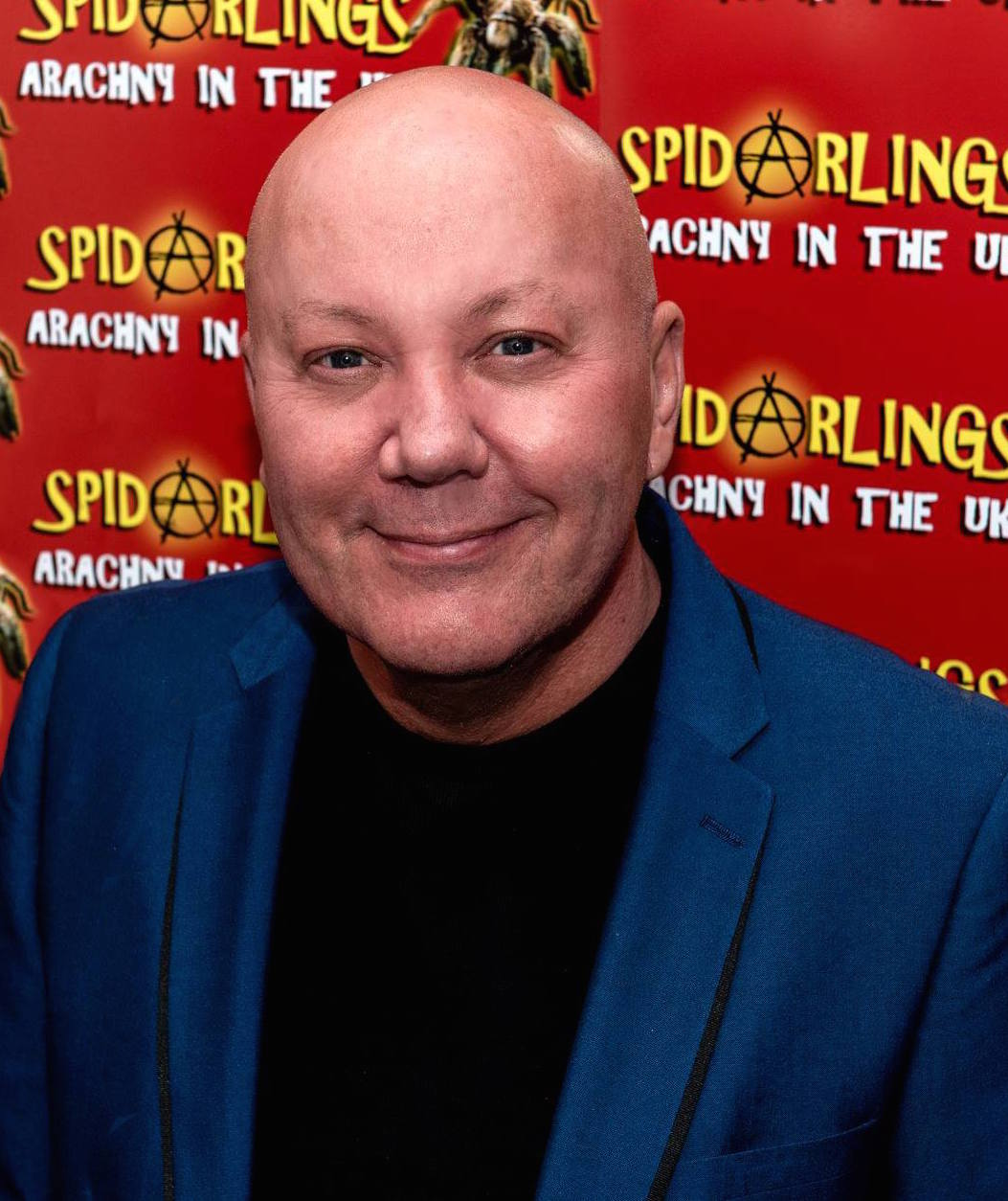
- Jeff Kristian at the Spidarlings Cast & Crew Premiere in 2016
- Born: Jeffrey William John Phillips; 11 May 1964 (age 61); Bermondsey, London, England
- Occupations: Singer; actor; writer; songwriter
- Years active: 1970–present
- Label: Mr Binks Media
- Website: http://www.jeffkristian.com/

Jeff Kristian (born Jeffrey William John Phillips, 11 May 1964) is an English recording artist, songwriter, actor, author, and television presenter. He is probably best remembered for his television role as Big Brother's Singing Drag Queen on Big Brother's Bit on the Side.

== Television ==
While attending school in Bermondsey, London in 1970, Kristian was cast as a Young Charlie Chaplin by entertainer Tommy Steele for his BBC vehicle, Tommy Steele in Search of Charlie Chaplin. In 1995, Kristian was interviewed for HTV's magazine programme Spotlight to promote his single Reach Out (I'll Be There). While filming Spotlight, he was almost arrested while waiting for the film crew at the station in Bristol. In costume, Police had mistaken him for a prostitute. 2003, he appeared on Channel 4's reality show The Salon. In 2012, he was cast as guest presenter Big Brother's Singing Drag queen on Channel 5's reality show Big Brother spin offs Big Brother's Bit on the Side and Celebrity Big Brother's Bit on the Side, alongside then presenter Emma Willis. From 2015, he was host and presenter on American television magazine programme London Calling.

== Film ==
Kristian's film debut was a short appearance as Queen of the Aliens in the 1998 Alexander Kauffman film Trouble on Earth, which featured at the Cannes Film Festival in 1999. Writer and director Eme Guitron cast him in the title roles in his short film Little Red Riding Hood: Uncensored in 2003 and Snow White: My Confidential Drawers in 2004, which featured at the Mexican Film Festival 2004. He was cast as The Man in the Gsus Lopez 2011 short Ephemeral Nature, which won Best Film at ASVOFF Barcelona 2012. Lopez also cast him as The Ice Cream Man in the 2013 short It Melts, which won Best Fashion Film at Charleston Fashion Week in 2014.

Kristian also starred as Mary in Lopez's short Out, which was nominated for The Dorothy Slipper Award 2014 and The European Short Film Award 2015. Kristian appeared as The Diva and The Jogger in Selene Kapsaski's feature Spidarlings. Kristian wrote and produced the film's soundtrack. His appearance in the film was described as the UK version of the great Divine (performer) and showcasing a versatility of genres of music as a songwriter.

== Stage ==
In 1979, Kristian became a founder member of The Spangles, a six-piece meet-and-greet group that followed Gary Glitter's entourage as he toured the UK university circuit before his later fall from grace under Operation Yewtree. From 1992 Kristian began touring the UK in cabaret, with his review The Kinky Hanky Panky Show. He followed this in 1993 with his female impersonation creation The Diva Show, which won Boyz Magazine's reader's poll award for Best Drag Act in 1994. The Stage Newspaper reviewed The Diva Show, stating: "There's no doubting his talent". He took up residency at Molly Moggs Theatre Bar in Soho, London with The Jeff Kristian Show, which at fifteen years was the longest running consecutive drag show in Soho's history.

== Recording ==
In 1985 Kristian became front man of R&B band Dooyah! Under Garry Winkler's Globaldale Management, they performed across the south-east of England, notably the 100 Club, Dingwalls, The Town and Country Club, The Rock Garden, The Mean Fiddler and The Cliffs Pavilion. A single Love's Where You Find It/Spend! Spend! Spend! was co-produced with Essex Radio DJ Roger Dexter. A live album of fifteen original songs produced by Stevie Wonder producer Malcolm Cecil at Westlake Studios in Hollywood was never released. In 1995, he released the EP single Reach Out (I'll Be There), an upbeat revival of the original 1966 Motown hit by The Four Tops.

In 2000, Maltese Eurovision star Chiara Siracusa recorded four songs written by Kristian for her album What You Want: Never Question Why, Stars, Fighting For My Love and Angel. In 2003, Kristian's 1995 single They Called It Love was recorded by family vocal group Next Of Kin and entered for the UK selection of The Eurovision Song Contest.

== Writing ==
Kristian has written features for several magazines, including LGBT History Month and Pinkwire, for which he has also written a regular light-hearted semi-autobiographical column since 2010 called Adventures of a Drag Queen. 2012 saw the publication of Kristian's debut novel Where D'Ya Put Yer Willy? September 2012, Kristian was invited to read from his book at The Polari Salon at London's Southbank Centre.

== Personal life ==
Kristian met his second partner, club-promoter David Warrior on Valentine's Day 1989, they created the men-only nightclub Attitude which ran for three years from 1993. In 1996, Kristian met his current partner, property developer Charlie Curtis.

== Activist ==
In 1994, Kristian publicly joined with a large group of Drag Queens including Lili Savage and Regina Fong to boycott the 1995 Gay Pride Festival, in relation to, "The committee's failure to meet any of our basic needs indicating the level of contempt in which we are obviously held." Between 1993 and 1995, Kristian and David Warrior created and co-owned Attitude, a controversial men only nightclub in Peckham, South London. The bar won three Capital Gay Readers' Poll Awards in 1995 for Best New Bar, Best Bar and Best Barman. In 2013, Kristian participated in an awareness campaign for registered charity The Katy Holmes Trust, along with Russell Watson, Wendi Peters and Tricia Penrose. In 2017, Kristian contributed to a charity single Love Is The Only Law to raise funds for The Albert Kennedy Trust, along with Samantha Fox, June Brown and Marcus Collins.
