= List of Big Brother (British TV series) shows =

This is a complete list of shows about and relating to Big Brother UK and Celebrity Big Brother. The civilian edition originally ran from 2000 to 2018, and again since 2023. The celebrity edition ran from 2001 to 2018, and again since 2024.

== Big Brother ==
Big Brother is the daily show, featuring highlights of events that have occurred in the Big Brother House on the previous day. From 2000 to 2010, during the Channel 4 broadcast, it was generally 60 minutes in length if aired at 9 pm, and 75 minutes if aired at 10 pm. The show was sometimes referred to as the "Channel 4 show", the "catch-up show", the "main show", or the "highlights show". On Fridays it was aired as the first part of the eviction show. The programme was broadcast by Channel 5 from 2011 to 2018 and aired each night for 60 minutes. There was no title of Big Brother during the opening sequence or after advert breaks, as the music and Big Brother Eye were expected to be known to most people. When the show relaunched for a second time on ITV2 in 2023, the highlights show will be broadcast from Sunday to Friday, with no episode on a Saturday.

=== Big Brother Eviction ===
Big Brother Eviction is a programme where a housemate is evicted from the Big Brother House.

==== Channel 4 ====
From 2000 to 2010, during the Channel 4 broadcast, it aired as a two-part show on Fridays from 9 pm, presented by Davina McCall. The first 60 minutes of the show were highlights of the previous day, shown in the same format as Big Brother.

The show returned at 10:35 pm for half an hour, when the Housemate with the largest percentage of the public vote was evicted and interviewed by McCall. At the end of the interview, the evictee is shown their "Time in the House", a compilation of their most memorable moments in the house. During Big Brother 10, two special guests such as celebrities and psychologists joined the evictee, giving their questions and views on how they fared in the House, however this was not carried through to any of the series that followed.

Eviction shows are often extended if something special is happening that night, such as new housemates, a double eviction, or a secret task. Timings were changed briefly in Big Brother 9 in order to achieve better ratings, however they soon reverted to normal.

==== Channel 5 ====
Celebrity Big Brother 8 saw only one eviction show airing at 9:00 pm on Friday. The first 45 minutes of this show was highlights from the previous day in the House.

The final 15 minutes of the same show is when the Housemate with the smallest percentage of the public vote to save is evicted and interviewed by Dowling. At the end of the interview, the evictee is shown their "Time in the House", a compilation of their most memorable moments in the house.

Since the start of the regular 2011 series of Big Brother, there have been two eviction shows airing, in the same format of the Channel 4 eviction shows. During the first show, the highlights of the previous day in the House are shown. In the second show, the Housemate with the fewest votes to save is evicted and interviewed by Brian Dowling. This is pre-recorded around half-hour before broadcast.

Celebrity Big Brother 9 took the same eviction show format as the eighth celebrity series, apart from the final week where two episodes aired. The first show aired at 9 pm with the highlights and an eviction. The second aired at 11 pm and saw another eviction and interview.

Big Brother 13 started with Eviction shows in the same length as the Celebrity Big Brother 8 episodes for the first four evictions, with Live Feed airing for half an hour afterwards on 5*. However, Channel 5 reverted to the 9 pm and 11 pm schedule from Week 5 to 7, with the Highlights and Eviction announcement airing at 9 pm and the eviction and interview taking place during the 11 pm show.

During Big Brother 14, eviction shows took on a 90-minute format airing between 9 pm and 10:30 pm on Channel 5. This format was followed throughout the series. The eviction show was followed by Big Brother's Bit on the Side at 10:30 pm and Big Brother: Live from the House at 11:30 pm.

The first week of Big Brother 15 saw the original two show format (at 9 for highlights and 11 pm for the eviction of Tamara Stewart-Wood) but from the second week the one 90-minute show format was reinstated with the eviction taking place just after 10 pm.

==== ITV2 ====
Big Brother: Live Eviction takes place on Fridays at 9pm and runs for an hour and a half. The evicted housemate is not immediately interviewed upon leaving the house and instead has their first interview on the spin-off show Big Brother: Late & Live.

Celebrity Big Brother: Live Eviction takes place on Tuesdays and Fridays at 9pm and runs for an hour and a half. As of the 24th series, the evicted housemate is interviewed upon leaving the house.

== Big Brother's Bit on the Side ==
Big Brother's Bit on the Side was the daily news/magazine based show about Big Brother which was presented by Rylan Clark-Neal every night of the week. Emma Willis previously presented the show on non-eviction nights, however as of February 2015, Clark became the sole presenter. The show is filmed in Stage 6 at Elstree Studios, which is only a short walk from the main house itself.

During Big Brother 14, the Saturday show was renamed Big Brother's Bit on the Psych with a focus on psychological analysis of the housemates and was presented by Clark with co-hosts Iain Lee and Luisa Zissman. The Sunday show was renamed Rylan's Supersized Celebrity Sunday during 2013 and focused on celebrity guests and entertainment. The Saturday and Sunday editions of Bit on the Side did not return for Celebrity Big Brother 15, meaning the show only aired 5 times a week. Prior to Big Brother 14, the show was presented by Emma Willis on weekdays, with Jamie East and Alice Levine on the weekend shows.

On 2 February 2015, it was announced that Emma Willis had decided to step down from her role on Bit on the Side in order to focus on presenting the main show and reduce her workload. The show's first episode aired on Channel 5 at 10:30 pm on 18 August, straight after the launch of the 2011 celebrity series with Alex Reid as the first panellist on the show.

=== Format ===
The show features debates and conversations about the latest goings on in the house with a studio audience and celebrity panel. During Big Brother 2011, Saturday's edition of the show took the form of a chat show with celebrity guests and Sunday's edition of the show was a 'Sunday game show', based on the weeks action from the House, with Josie Gibson and Jamie East as the regular team captains. Each daily edition also contains a news feature covering the day's action in the Big Brother House. The show also contains a round up of online activity which was hosted by a member of the digital team until January 2015. It is now incorporated into the main show and hosted by the presenter on that evening.

=== Show changes ===
On 17 April 2013, it was announced that Alice Levine and Jamie East would be departing the show. On 14 May, Channel 5 confirmed that Rylan Clark and AJ Odudu will present the show, alongside Willis from Tuesdays to Thursdays and post eviction each week. Clark would also present a Sunday lunchtime edition of the show. It is sub-titled Rylan's Supersized Celebrity Sunday.

Also a spin-off show, Big Brother's Bit on the Psych would be aired on Saturday nights (instead of BBBOTS), with guests and psychologists examining housemates' behaviour during the week, hosted by AJ and Iain Lee. This show is similar to other psychology-based shows that have previously aired, most notably Big Brother: On the Couch shown during BB8 and was hosted by McCall.

AJ did not return to Bit on the Side in January 2014 and was replaced by Rylan as the sole presenter on the days that Emma was not working. He also took over presenting Bit on the Psych alongside Iain Lee who was promoted to a regular co-host. During the January series, Carol McGiffin was a regular panellist however, she was replaced by Luisa Zissman from summer 2014.

For the 15th series of Celebrity Big Brother in January 2015, Bit on the Side was cut down from 6 episodes a week 5 episodes a week. During Big Brother 16, Channel 5 announced that the show would be given an extended slot on Monday evenings and would be renamed Big Brother's Bigger Bit on the Side; the show featured extra analysis of the housemates, more exclusives and more celebrity guests. There is no news on whether the extended editions will continue for Celebrity Big Brother 16.

In August 2015, it was revealed that Bit on the Side would revert to its original 7 nights a week format for the 16th edition of Celebrity Big Brother. The weekday episodes would air on Channel 5, with the weekend episodes airing on 5*. The Weekend Edition was titled Big Brother's Bit on the State Side and was presented by Rylan Clark-Neal.

=== Panellists ===
The weekday shows feature a panel of guests. Panellists that have appeared on the show, so far, have included many ex Big Brother and Celebrity Big Brother contestants, amongst other celebrities not directly linked to Big Brother such as Kate Walsh and Jay Camilleri from E4's Dirty Sexy Things. Former Bit on the Side co-host, AJ Odudu, had also appeared on occasions, as well as former hosts Jamie and Alice (on weekday shows).

==== Regular panellists and presenters of in-show features ====
- Kerry Katona (2011–18)
- Nikki Grahame (2011–18)
- Lisa Appleton (2011, 2013–18)
- Nicola McLean (2011–18)
- Sinitta (2011–14, 2016–18)
- Gemma Collins (2012–18)
- Denise Welch (2012–18)
- Rustie Lee (2012–18)
- Carol McGiffin (2012–18)
- Kim Woodburn (2012–18)
- Roman Kemp (2012–13, 2015, 2017–18)
- Charlotte Crosby (2013–18)
- Katie Price (2013–18)
- Christian Howes (2013–17)
- Stephanie Pratt (2013–18)
- Su Pollard (2013–18)
- Nina Wadia (2014–18)
- Eamonn Holmes (2014–18)
- Luisa Zissman (2014–18)
- Anthony Costa (2014–18)
- James Jordan (2014–18)
- Philip Olivier (2014–18)
- Michelle Visage (2014–18)
- Bobby-Cole Norris (2015–18)
- Dan Wootton (2015–18)
- Ricky Norwood (2015–18)
- Tyger Drew-Honey (2015–18)
- Tiffany Pollard (2016–18)
- Kieron Richardson (2016–18)
- Ola Jordan (2016–18)
- Andy West (2016–18)
- Ian "H" Watkins (2017–18)
- Trisha Goddard (2017–18)
- Tom Read Wilson (2017–18)
- Amy Childs (2011–13, 2015)
- Kian Egan (2011–12)
- Martin Kemp (2012–13)
- Coleen Nolan (2012–15)
- Aisleyne Horgan Wallace (2011–15)
- Gillian Taylforth (2013)
- Lee Ryan (2014)
- Jim Davidson (2014–15)
- Christopher Biggins (2014–16)
- Stephanie Davis (2017)

=== Broadcast ===
Series	Monday	Tuesday	Wednesday	Thursday	Friday	Saturday	Sunday
Celebrity Big Brother 8	Channel 5	5*		Channel 5		5*	
Big Brother 12	Channel 5	5*		Channel 5		5*	
Celebrity Big Brother 9	Channel 5					5*	
Big Brother 13	Channel 5					5*	
Celebrity Big Brother 10	Channel 5					5*	
Celebrity Big Brother 11	Channel 5						
Big Brother 14	Channel 5						
Celebrity Big Brother 12	Channel 5						
Celebrity Big Brother 13	Channel 5						—N/a
Big Brother 15	Channel 5						—N/a
Celebrity Big Brother 14	Channel 5						—N/a
Celebrity Big Brother 15	Channel 5					—N/a	—N/a
Big Brother 16	Channel 5					—N/a	—N/a
Celebrity Big Brother 16	5*		Channel 5				
Celebrity Big Brother 17	Channel 5					—N/a	—N/a
Big Brother 17	Channel 5					—N/a	—N/a
Celebrity Big Brother 18	Channel 5					—N/a	5Star
Celebrity Big Brother 19	Channel 5					—N/a	—N/a
Big Brother 18	Channel 5					—N/a	—N/a
Celebrity Big Brother 20	Channel 5					—N/a	5Star
Celebrity Big Brother 21	Channel 5					—N/a	—N/a
Celebrity Big Brother 22	Channel 5					—N/a	—N/a
Big Brother 19	Channel 5					—N/a	—N/a

=== Presenters ===
Series	Monday	Tuesday	Wednesday	Thursday	Friday	Saturday	Sunday
Celebrity Big Brother 8	Emma Willis; Jamie East	Emma Willis			Emma Willis; Jamie East	Alice Levine; Jamie East	
Big Brother 12	Emma Willis; Jamie East	Emma Willis			Emma Willis; Jamie East	Alice Levine; Jamie East	
Celebrity Big Brother 9	Emma Willis; Jamie East	Emma Willis			Emma Willis; Jamie East	Alice Levine; Jamie East	
Big Brother 13	Emma Willis; Jamie East	Emma Willis			Emma Willis; Jamie East	Alice Levine; Jamie East	
Celebrity Big Brother 10	Emma Willis; Jamie East	Emma Willis			Emma Willis; Jamie East	Alice Levine; Jamie East	
Celebrity Big Brother 11	Emma Willis; Jamie East	Emma Willis			Emma Willis; Jamie East	Alice Levine; Jamie East	
Big Brother 14	AJ Odudu; Rylan Clark	Emma Willis			AJ Odudu; Rylan Clark	AJ Odudu; Iain Lee	Rylan Clark
Celebrity Big Brother 12	Emma Willis		Rylan Clark; AJ Odudu	Emma Willis	AJ Odudu; Rylan Clark	AJ Odudu; Iain Lee	Rylan Clark
Celebrity Big Brother 13	Emma Willis		Rylan Clark	Emma Willis	Rylan Clark	Rylan Clark; Iain Lee	—N/a
Big Brother 15	Rylan Clark	Emma Willis			Rylan Clark	Rylan Clark; Iain Lee	—N/a
Celebrity Big Brother 14	Emma Willis		Rylan Clark	Emma Willis	Rylan Clark	Rylan Clark; Iain Lee	—N/a
Celebrity Big Brother 15	Emma Willis	Rylan Clark	Emma Willis		Rylan Clark	—N/a	—N/a
Big Brother 16	Rylan Clark					—N/a	—N/a
Celebrity Big Brother 16	Rylan Clark						
Celebrity Big Brother 17	Rylan Clark-Neal					—N/a	—N/a
Big Brother 17	Rylan Clark-Neal					—N/a	—N/a
Celebrity Big Brother 18	Rylan Clark-Neal					—N/a	Rylan Clark-Neal
Celebrity Big Brother 19	Rylan Clark-Neal					—N/a	—N/a
Big Brother 18	Rylan Clark-Neal					—N/a	—N/a
Celebrity Big Brother 20	Rylan Clark-Neal					—N/a	Rylan Clark-Neal
Celebrity Big Brother 21	Rylan Clark-Neal					—N/a	—N/a
Celebrity Big Brother 22	Rylan Clark-Neal					—N/a	—N/a
Big Brother 19	Rylan Clark-Neal					—N/a	—N/a

==== Notes ====
Celebrity Big Brother 8

- Willis hosted the 27 August 2011 show due to Levine attending a wedding.

Big Brother 12

- East and Levine hosted the 14 October 2011 show due to Willis taking an extended weekend break.
- Dowling guest hosted the show for the week commencing 31 October 2011.

Big Brother 13

- Levine hosted the 12 July 2012 show due to Willis taking a break.
- Willis was absent on 25–26 July and 30 August 2012 due to illness, so was replaced by East and Levine.
- Levine hosted the 27 July 2012 eviction show, due to Willis' continuing absence because of illness.

Big Brother 14

- From this series onwards, Saturday's edition of Big Brother's Bit on the Side was renamed Big Brother's Bit on the Psych, whilst Sunday's edition has been sub-titled Rylan's Supersized Celebrity Sunday.
- Clark and Odudu hosted the 13 June launch show, due to Willis hosting the main show.
- Odudu was brought in as cover for 30 June 2013, due to Clark performing in Belfast the night before. But, Clark made it back in time so it was double headed. Odudu still appeared on the show during one of the games.
- Matt Johnson co-hosted the 17 August Psych show with Odudu due to Lee being suspended.

Celebrity Big Brother 12

- Clark and Odudu hosted the 22 August launch show, due to Willis hosting the main show.
- For this series, Emma now hosts Monday night's edition whilst AJ and Rylan host Wednesday's, due to the mid-week evictions.
- The editions on 30 August and 6 September were 90 minutes long.
- Willis and Lee co-hosted the 13 September finale show alongside AJ and Rylan.

Celebrity Big Brother 13

- For this series, Emma continues to host Monday's, Tuesday's and Thursday's editions whereas Rylan hosts Wednesday's and Friday's editions with Emma for part of show due to the departure of AJ Odudu. He takes over Saturday's Psych show and co-hosts it with Lee, who is promoted from regular guest. Carol McGiffin joins Saturday's Psych edition as a regular guest, much like Lee's previous role.
- For this series, there is no longer a Sunday edition.
- Celebrity Super Spa host Laura Jackson acts as a roving reporter for this series.

Big Brother 15

- For this series, Emma hosts Tuesday–Thursday and Rylan hosts both Monday's and Friday's editions. Rylan co-hosts Saturday's Psych show with Iain. Luisa Zissman will serve as regular panellist, appearing throughout the week instead of just on a Saturday like Carol.
- Clark hosted the 5 June launch show, due to Willis hosting the main show.
- Matt Johnson hosted 26 July show with Iain Lee as Rylan was off

Celebrity Big Brother 14

- Rylan hosted the Monday edition and Emma hosted the Wednesday edition for the first week only. From week 2, Emma hosts Monday, Tuesday and Thursday, whilst Rylan will host Wednesday and Friday. Iain Lee, again, co-hosts Saturday with Rylan.
- Luisa returned as a regular panellist
- There was no episode on 30 August.
- Rylan hosted the 8 September edition due to Emma attending an awards show

Celebrity Big Brother 15

- Rylan now hosts the Tuesday and Friday editions as these are eviction nights, instead of Wednesday and Friday like the previous series. Emma will host Monday, Wednesday and Thursday. There is no Saturday edition for the first time.
- Luisa appeared four times as a panellist, unable to commit to more.
- Rylan hosted the 21 January edition due to Emma attending an award show.
- Emma hosted her final ever edition on 2 February. For the final week, Rylan hosted the Tuesday through to Friday editions.

Celebrity Big Brother 16

- The weekend editions were reintroduced and hosted on sister channel 5*.
- The 23 September edition aired on 5* instead of Channel 5

Celebrity Big Brother 17

- Rylan Clark is now credited as Rylan Clark-Neal, since he married Dan Neal on 7 November 2015

Celebrity Big Brother 20

- The 10 August edition aired on 5* instead of Channel 5

=== Experts and correspondents ===
Person(s)	Title
Judi James; Pam Spurr; Anna Williamson	Psychologists
Luisa Zissman; Various guest	Reporters
Alice Levine; Jamie East	Roving reporters (regular)
Jeff Kristian	Drag queen act
Kirk Norcross; John McCririck	Sex experts
Christian Howes	Social Media expert Housemate analysis
Nina Myskow	Media trainer
Lauren Harries; Pete Burns	Fashion experts
Ian Symes; Ian Roe; Helen Price; Louisa Emery; Charlotte James	BB Digital Reporter(s)
Victor Ebuwa	(Various)
Nikki Grahame; Linda Papadopoulos	Psychologists
Brian Dowling	Former Big Brother host

== Live from the House ==
Celebrity Big Brother: Live from the House was a one-hour show airing straight after the Live Eviction show on Channel 5, at 10 pm on 5*. The show focuses on the aftermath of the eviction. The show airs before spin-off show Big Brother's Bit on the Side, which airs at 11 pm. It first aired as part of Celebrity Big Brother 9's schedule. The programme featured one hour of "live" streaming, which was absent from both Celebrity Big Brother 8 and Big Brother 12.

=== 2012 ===
It returned for Big Brother 13, renamed Big Brother: Live from the House, as a 30-minute show on 6 July 2012 (four weeks into the series). For Celebrity Big Brother 10, the show moved to Channel 5 and now broadcasts twice-weekly for 30 minutes (or 60 minutes depending on schedule). An episode, featuring live nominations, on 17 August 2012 pulled in 2.22m viewers at 10 pm on Channel 5. This slightly outrated the night's highlights show which took 2.18m viewers. These two episodes were broadcast during the Celebrity Big Brother 10 series.

=== 2013 ===
Channel 5 announced on 14 May 2013 that the live feed will be partly reinstated, for two hours per day. Big Brother: Live from the House aired each night from 19:00 on 5* during Big Brother 14, except for Sundays which only featured one hour from 20:00. Both launch nights featured 30 minutes of live feed after Bit on the Side from 23:30 on Channel 5 and this will continue after every eviction during the series.

On 26 June, it was announced that the daily live feed on 5* would be axed and replaced with other programming, starting 6 July 2013. However, two days later, it emerged that the final daily instalment of Live from the House would now air on 30 June at 8 pm (a week earlier than originally planned).

=== 2014 ===
For Celebrity Big Brother 2014, Live from the House was axed online from midnight to 2 am and replaced with a 30-minute edition of live streaming every Friday night from 11:30 pm on Channel 5.

Channel 5 again axed Big Brother: Live from the House during the fifteenth edition of Big Brother. This was to make way for order for Channel 5's new dating show Stand By Your Man meaning as with Celebrity Big Brother 8 and Big Brother 12, live streaming was completely unavailable to viewers.

Prior to the launch of the fourteenth series of Celebrity Big Brother, Channel 5 announced that Big Brother: Live from the House would make a return to Channel 5 airing most nights from 12 midnight after Big Brothers Bit on the Side for the first week of the series.

=== 2015 ===
For the fifteenth series of Celebrity Big Brother in January 2015, Live from the House will again air after evictions on Channel 5. This then continued on for Big Brother 16.

Prior to launch of the sixteenth series of Celebrity Big Brother, Channel 5 announced that Live Feed would be reinstated on sister Channel 5* every week night for 1 hour at midnight until 1 am. This will also be joined by the 30 minutes of live feed on Channel 5 after each eviction night, meaning there will be 90 minutes of live feed every eviction night and 1 hour every other week night.

== Pre/post Big Brother shows ==
These are a collection of shows that are shown a couple of days before the live launch of an upcoming series. They are usually recaps of previous series and catchup of previous housemates. Dermot O'Leary was usually the host until his departure from the show in 2008.

Name	Series	Date aired	Description	Host
Big Brother's Biggest Best Bits	BB20	5 October 2023	AJ Odudu and Will Best relive their favourite moments from inside the Big Brother house, including their most memorable housemates, iconic tasks, and diary room rants.	AJ Odudu; Will Best
Celebrity Big Brother: Behind the Scenes	CBB21	24 January 2018	An in-depth look through the keyhole of the famous Celebrity Big Brother house, revealing a compelling glimpse at the work that goes on behind the scenes.	Marcus Bentley
Big Brother: The Good, the Bad and the Outrageous	CBB16	19 September 2015	A 60-minute best bits show airing on 5* showing some of the best moments from the past five civilian series of Big Brother on Channel 5.	Marcus Bentley
Celebrity Big Brother: Best Bits Series	CBB16	29 August – 12 September 2015	A series of best bits shows airing every Saturday during Celebrity Big Brother 16 on 5* at 9 pm. The shows will have a new theme each week and will look back at the best bits from Celebrity Big Brother on Channel 5.	Marcus Bentley
Celebrity Big Brother: The Best, The Worst and The Unforgettable	CBB15	1 January 2015	Adding to the buildup for Celebrity Big Brother 15, the show takes a look back at some of the best bits from the past fourteen series of Celebrity Big Brother	Emma Willis
Big Brother: The Auditions	BB13	5 June 2012	A look at the auditions for Big Brother 13, and the introduction of three potential wildcard housemates to complete the list of sixteen for the upcoming series.	Jamie East
Big Brother: The Winner's Story	BB12	16 November 2011	A look back on the winner of Big Brother 12 in the House.	Marcus Bentley
Celebrity Big Brother: The Winner's Story	CBB8	9 September 2011	A look back on the winner of Celebrity Big Brother 8 in the House.	Marcus Bentley
Big Brother: Silent Library	CBB8/BB12	16 August 2011	Six former Big Brother participants, who face the daunting challenges of the library in order to win money for Great Ormond Street Hospital. Former housemates who took part in the special were Spencer Smith from Big Brother 3, Big Brother 7 runner-up Glyn Wise, Big Brother 8 winner Brian Belo, Marcus Akin from Big Brother 10, Big Brother 11's Sam Pepper and Big Brother 11 winner Josie Gibson.	Zero Kazama
Big Brother Exposed: The Inside Story	BB11	28 May 2010	Behind-the-scenes documentary of all the series in Big Brother.	Davina McCall
Big Brother's Big Awards Show	BB11	22 May 2010	Celebrating the best moments of Big Brother from series 1–10.	Davina McCall
Top 20 Celebrity Big Brother Moments	CBB7	28 December 2009	A look back at the top twenty Celebrity Big Brother moments from its first six series, which were voted by viewers online.	Jack Whitehall
Big Brother: A Decade in the Headlines	BB10	30 May 2009	A look back at the impact Big Brother has had on the world.	Grace Dent
Big Brother's Big Quiz	BB10	29 May 2009	Involves ex-housemates and comedians answering questions all things Big Brother.	Davina McCall
Jade: As Seen on TV	BB10	26 May 2009	Programme looking back at Jade Goody's life	Patsy Palmer
Why I Love Celebrity Big Brother	CBB6	27 December 2008	Programme which shows the best parts of past series of Celebrity Big Brother, plus interviews from celebrity fans and past. housemates	George Lamb
The Big Brother Launch Night Project	BB9	5 June 2008	A special show on the Launch Night of Big Brother 9 links The Sunday Night Project to Big Brother.	Alan Carr; Justin Lee Collins
Big Brother: The Auditions	BB9	1 June 2008	2 part series showing a look at the 2008 auditions featuring ex-housemates, including Nikki Grahame, Michelle Bass and Charley Uchea	Mathew Horne
Big Brother: More Auditions	BB9	2 June 2008	2 part series showing a look at the 2008 auditions featuring ex-housemates, including Nikki Grahame, Michelle Bass and Charley Uchea	Mathew Horne
Big Brother: According to Russell Brand	BB8	25 May 2007	Russell Brand looks back at the history of Big Brother UK	Russell Brand
Big Brother: After They Were Housemates	BB7	25 May 2007	Dermot O'Leary chats to housemates about their life after their time in the house.	Marcus Bentley
Big Brother: Around the World	BB:CH	30 December 2007	The best of the housemates, the arguments, the romance, the twists and the controversies from across the globe.	Dermot O'Leary
Big Brother: Most Funniest Moments	BB6	May 2005	The Funniest Moments from series 1–5	Dermot O'Leary
Big Brother: Most Outrageous Moments	BB6	May 2005	The Most Outrageous Moments from series 1–5	Dermot O'Leary
Big Brother: The Love Stories	BB7	May 2006	Marcus Bentley up with the contests who created romance inside the house.	Marcus Bentley
Big Brother: Top 20 Housemates	BB6	May 2005	Dermot O'Leary takes us through the top 20 housemates from series 1 to 5	Dermot O'Leary
Big Brother: Top 20 Housemates	BB7	May 2006	Dermot O'Leary takes us through the top 20 housemates from series 1 to 6	Dermot O'Leary
Big Brother: Living With Evil	CBB3	5 January 2005	Dermot O'Leary brings us back through the series when Big Brother turned evil	Dermot O'Leary
Big Brother: Top 50 Moments	BB5	May 2004	Dermot O'Leary takes us through the top 50 moments from series 1 to 4	Dermot O'Leary
Big Brother: The Celebrity Years	CBB4	January 2006	Dermot O'Leary takes us through series 1 to 3 of the celebrity edition	Dermot O'Leary
The Best of Celebrity Big Brother 2006	CBB5	30 December 2006	Dermot O'Leary takes us back to CBB4	Dermot O'Leary
How Not To Get on Big Brother	BB3	May 2002	A look at how not to get chosen to enter the Big Brother UK house and behind the scenes at the BB3 auditions	Mackenzie Crook
Big Brother Hopefuls	Various	Various	Prior to some of the earlier series of Big Brother, potential housemates' audition tapes would be shown in the mornings on E4, during the timeslots Big Brother Live would be filling in the coming weeks.	—N/a
Big Brother: Small World	BB3	January 2002	The best of Big Brother from around the globe	Davina McCall
Inside Big Brother	BB2	May 2001	See how the first series in the UK was made	Adam Buxton
Big Brother: The World is Watching	BB1	September 2000	A look at the first ever Big Brother in the Netherlands and other versions	Tessa Wojtczak

== OK! TV: When 'Bruv Takes Over ==
OK! TV: When 'Bruv Takes Over was hosted by Jeff Brazier and Jenny Frost live from Elstree. The show launched from the Big Brother compound at Elstree Studios on 17 August 2011 with a preview of the new house. It provided updated news, gossip and discussion on events in the house with a variety of celebrity guests dropping in. However the show was axed due to low ratings and Channel 5's contract with ITN being withdrawn.

== Big Brother Live ==
Big Brother Live was live streaming from the House.

It aired mostly on E4 for the Channel 4 broadcast, and sometimes for 1 or 2 hours early in the morning on Channel 4.

The feed was presented as live, but was actually transmitted on a 15-minute delay to enable producers to censor any material that is inappropriate.

== Big Brother Special ==
A Big Brother Special is a general term that is used to describe any live non-eviction episode hosted by Davina McCall aired in place of the daily highlights. Big Brother Specials typically involve the introduction of a new housemate, a twist implemented by Big Brother, a culmination of a task, or live nominations. The Specials were discontinued in 2010.

== Big Brother's Little Brother ==
Big Brother's Little Brother (also known as BBLB) was a magazine television programme that aired from 2001 to 2010 on Channel 4 and E4, running in conjunction with each series of Big Brother. It was presented by Dermot O'Leary until January 2008, then by George Lamb from June 2008 – January 2010. For Channel 4's last series of the show, Emma Willis joined him.

Between 6 June and 25 July 2008, Zezi Ifore was a co-presenter, but was soon removed.

The programme looks at Big Brother-related activities outside the House and features interviews with celebrities, journalists and friends and family of housemates, and sometimes recently evicted housemates. It also gives updates to events in the House, including announcing on Mondays who is up for eviction. The show is filmed in The George Lucas Stage at Elstree Studios, which is only a short walk from the main house itself.

=== Broadcast ===
The show was first aired on 29 May 2001 as a part of Big Brother 2. Natalie Casey was a co-host with O'Leary for the first week that year. It was shown every Sunday morning as part of Channel 4's T4 slot as well as on E4 during the week.

For Celebrity Big Brother 4, broadcast in January 2006, Big Brother's Little Brother was moved to a morning slot of 8 am on Channel 4 and renamed Big Brother's Little Breakfast. It was moved back to its previous timeslot on E4 for Big Brother 7 and subsequent series.

=== Features ===
Over the years, Big Brother's Little Brother has had many features introduced, from quizzes to secret cameras. The following is a list of some of the items the show has launched:

- The George Lamb Diary Room Challenge – A quiz and challenge feature run during Celebrity Big Brother 6 to determine the ultimate BB Superfan. The winner gets the chance to have an access all areas tour, meet Davina, and go into the Diary room for a chat with Big Brother. The final round took place on Tuesday 20 January and featured the winners of the 2 semi-finals. Sonny Sleight from Canterbury was the first contestant to reach the final, eventually joined by Richard DeGottal. After first participating in a quiz which Sonny won, a 'superfan spacehopper race' took place outside the house itself. Richard pipped Sonny to the post and a chilli eating contest tie breaker took place. Richard eventually won but both contestants got the chance to meet Davina, enter the house and meet the housemates after the competition ended.
- The George Lamb Quiz of the Decade – A quiz feature during series 10 celebrating Big Brother's 10th Birthday and aiming to find the ultimate BB superfan from 3 viewers each week
- Big Brother's News 25 – 24 Hour News And Then Some – featured on series 10. Lamb reports on recent news items, with accompanying video clips. In Celebrity Big Brother 2010, this was changed to Hot News.
- Little Brother's Big Answer, formerly known as Little Brother's Big Shout and BBLB Forum – At the start of the show, viewers are invited to call, text, e-mail, and appear via webcam to give opinions on topical issues in the house. This is the final item on the show, and the discussion will usually include any celebrity guests that appear on the show. Zezi often complains about the computer not working. This feature did not reappear during series 10.
- The Insider – a man that stands behind a wall of frosted glass. The Insider often reveals exclusive news, such as nominations results and unexpected twists or tasks. The Insider's identity is unknown. He is not in BB9.
- A Hidden Camera section, where footage is shown from a camera hidden within an object in the house. The first of these was Fridge Cam, which appeared during the third Celebrity series. Gnome Cam followed in (BB6), where a hidden camera was placed within a garden gnome. Queen Cam was hidden in the eye of a portrait of Queen Elizabeth II, and, most recently, Bunny Cam was added to a rabbit-sculptured topiary. Bunny Cam was later destroyed by BB7 housemate Glyn as he used it to climb down from the roof of the house (not on show). In BB10 a toy helicopter was flown over the house several time throughout the season and contained a hidden camera. It was known as Heli Cam.
- The B-Team – A parody of the A-Team, four ex-housemates present a video clip, in which they interview people about their thoughts of the events in the house. It originated in Celebrity Big Brother 5 with former Big Brother 7 housemates Glyn Wise, Lea Walker, Shahbaz, and Spiral. For Big Brother 8, Walker was replaced with Nikki Grahame (not on show).
- That Gameshow Thing is a gameshow between Emma Willis and BBLB guests/ex-housemates.

BBLB was axed after the move to Channel 5, although it was initially said to return. It was replaced with Big Brother's Bit on the Side, which is said to be a combination of BBLB and BBBM.

== Big Brother's Big Mouth ==
Big Brother's Big Mouth, formerly named Big Brother's EFourum, was introduced with Big Brother 6 and was hosted by Russell Brand. The first series of the show was broadcast at 7:30 pm on E4 before being moved to a post-watershed slot, immediately after the Channel 4 highlights show, where it has since remained. A studio audience of fans and two celebrity guests discuss the latest happenings in the Big Brother House, while viewers are able to contribute via phone, e-mail, text polls, or by leaving a message on the 24-hour "Mouthpiece" rant line.

By 2007, Brand no longer presented this show and the guest presenters listed below hosted the series 8 programmes. James Corden and Mathew Horne fronted the show during January's Big Brother: Celebrity Hijack; only returning for Week 9 of the 2008 series. During this series, the show was temporarily renamed Big Mouth with Davina when it was fronted during the final week by Davina McCall. After his week one and twelve stints on the 2008 Big Mouth, Jack Whitehall presented the 2009 Celebrity Big Brother edition full-time. McCall was the host for the 2009 series, which had a revised format and was moved to a weekly hour-long slot after the eviction show. She then continued to host the programme for its final series in 2010.

Channel 5 announced that the programme would not return in 2011, but a replacement called Big Brother's Bit on the Side was created. It was a mixture of Big Brother's Big Mouth and Big Brother's Little Brother.

=== Spin-offs ===
A similar spin-off was introduced in the 2008 Australian version of Big Brother. However, Big Mouth has been used as a replacement of the "Adults Only" program, which has been broadcast at a later time slot, in an uncut and unrated presentation.

Big Brother's Big Mouth also had a Bulgarian version during Big Brother 3 Bulgaria, and it returned with a new concept for VIP Brother 3. In 2014, the show aired for the third time, covering VIP Brother 6 and Big Brother All Stars 3.

=== Characters ===
During the series presented by Brand, several regular characters were featured on the show.

That Whale: That Whale is an anthropomorphic whale who speaks with a Scouse accent. He shows little interest in Big Brother but seems adamant that he has a right to be on the show and still turns up regardless. Due to his obnoxious behaviour, he was asked by Brand to no longer come on the show. His trademark saying is "You Shithouse!" He only comes on the show now to find another male to make love with, since he came out as a homosexual.

Rosebud the Horse: Rosebud the Horse is a very polite and well-spoken character who allegedly lives with Brand in his home, in which he works as his slave and is often mistreated and forced to carry out perverted misdemeanours by members of the "Womanising Circuit" including Beppe di Marco, Dean Gaffney and David Walliams. He dresses in the style of a country gent, with tweed jacket, smart shirt and tie. He is often treated badly by Brand; in one episode he slapped him in the face.

Little Jon Connell: Little Jon Connell (born 1989 in Liverpool) normally appears in a scientist's lab coat to conduct a variety of experiments. His contraptions, which illustrate a number of Big Brother-related findings based on his scientific research, are regularly vilified and destroyed by Brand. Jon Connell is known as a Big Brother expert, having appeared on the show since the age of 15, first as a panellist on EFourum and then later in a regular slot entitled "The Connell Files".

Little Paul Scholes: Little Paul Scholes was a small doll with ginger hair, a nasal voice and snub nose, in a reference to the football player Paul Scholes. The doll was usually in the programme for a few minutes after the break in occasional shows and has a short conversation (often centring on his mistreatment) with Brand, usually resulting in him being hit off the bench or sat on. He died in the final Big Brother's Big Mouth of Celebrity Big Brother 2007 following the live final.

According to Brand, when he recorded a one-off special charting the previous seven series of the show, all of these characters have died. This was Brand's last time presenting as a Big Brother host.

Russell's ballbags: Russell's scrotum, which seems to live a sensational life separate from him. One of them is the "younger, shyer bag", and the other is the "older, more confident bag". They were characters throughout series 7 and were replaced by some new "Dicksacks" for the 2007 Celebrity edition of the show.

Big Kenneth: A friend of That Whale. Big Kenneth has appeared on the show once with That Whale in an attempt to beat up Brand and has also been round to Brand's house in an incident that may have led to an assault upon Beppe.

Big Brother 8 saw the introduction of the "Eyepiece", for which viewers were invited to send in their views via mobile phone video messaging. During this series, the show aired four nights a week with a series of guest presenters hosting the show for weekly stints. These were:

=== Presenters ===
Week 1		Week 2	Week 3	Week 4	Week 5	Week 6	Week 7	Week 8	Week 9	Week 10	Week 11	Week 12	Week 13
Big Brother (2004) – Celebrity Big Brother (2007)
Russell Brand
Big Brother (2007)
Chris Moyles	George Galloway	Alexa Chung	Keith Lemon	Russell Kane	John McCririck, The Booby, Copper	Dan Wright; Stephen Marsh	Thaila Zucchi	Peaches Geldof	Mathew Horne, James Corden	Emma Griffiths	Pete Burns	Jack Madeley, Chloe Madeley	Ian Wright
Big Brother: Celebrity Hijack'
Mathew Horne & James Corden
Big Brother (2008)
Jack Whitehall	Chris Moyles	Queens of Noize	Jeff Leach	Nick Grimshaw	Caroline Flack	Bianca Gascoigne	Michael McIntyre	Jamelia	Mathew Horne, James Corden	Keith Lemon	Rickie Haywood Williams, Melvin Odoom	Jack Whitehall	Davina McCall
Celebrity Big Brother (2009)
Jack Whitehall
Big Brother (2009) –Ultimate Big Brother (2010)
Davina McCall*

* Emma Willis hosted the 27 January 2010 show of the seventh celebrity series, due to Davina being inside the Big Brother House.

== Big Brother's Big i ==
Big Brother's Big i (first known as Celebrity Big Brother's Big i) was an internet web show hosted by Emma Willis where latest stories and exclusive specials like interviews, are introduced to viewers on Big Brother website and YouTube respectively.

The programme did not return for its eleventh series.

== Diary Room Uncut ==
Diary Room Uncut features events throughout the week, mostly through footage of Diary Room conversations. However, some clips on the show feature other parts of the house. It is narrated by Marcus Bentley. The show did not return for Big Brother 2010, and aired as a small part of the BBLB Show on Sundays. The show did not return with Celebrity Big Brother when the show moved to Channel 5 back in 2011, however the 2012 Sunday episode of Big Brother's Bit on the Side features a small segment.

== What the Housemates Did Next ==
A week after the Big Brother 3 to Big Brother 9 finales aired, a catchup show revealed what individual housemates had been up to since leaving the Big Brother house.

== Big Brother's Big Ears ==
Big Ears was introduced for Big Brother 9 as the Big Brother radio show. Hosted by Iain Lee and Gemma Cairney, Big Ears aired twice a week on the BB Website and often featured interviews from past housemates and the latest evictee as well as calls from fans.

== Big Brother: On the Streets ==
Also aired during Big Brother 9, Big Brother: On the Streets hosted by Tom Thurlow shows views on Big Brother from various places. It was broadcast on Channel 4's sister channel E4's website weekly.

== Big Brother Reveals More... ==
Big Brother Reveals More... was a show that saw a roundup of the week's footage. It only ran the one series during Big Brother 2 and has never appeared again. However, it can be likened to Diary Room Uncut.

== Saturday Night Live ==
Saturday Night Live was a show which saw Big Brother setting live tasks in order for housemate to get access to treats/reward rooms. It ran throughout Big Brother 3, Big Brother 4, and halfway through Big Brother 5. It was axed due to poor ratings.

== Nominations Uncut ==
Nominations Uncut was a show aired on the digital free-to-air channel E4. The show consisted of unedited footage of housemates making their weekly nominations. The show was broadcast throughout series 4, 5 and 6.

== Big Brother's Big Brain ==
Big Brother's Big Brain was a live discussion programme that aired from 22 May 2006 during Big Brother 7 until the end of Celebrity Big Brother 2007. It aired on Channel 4 every Monday at 11:05 pm. Presented by Dermot O'Leary, the show featured psychologists analysing the housemates' behaviour. This replaced the pre-recorded psychology clips shown on the Sunday night highlights show in previous series. BBBB was renamed Big Brother: on the Couch for Big Brother 8 with a new timeslot and Davina McCall replacing O'Leary as presenter.

== Big Brother's Efourum ==
Big Brother's Efourum was a live debate show, presented by Russell Brand, featuring a studio audience who would pose questions to a panel of celebrity guests and experts. The programme also introduced 15-year-old Jon Connell as a regular pundit on the panel. It aired from 31 May 2004 during Big Brother 5 until the end of Celebrity Big Brother 2005. The show was broadcast three nights a week at 7:00 pm on E4 with a late-night Channel 4 repeat. In 2005, Big Brother's Efourum was reformatted and renamed Big Brother's Big Mouth.

== Big Brother: On the Couch ==
Big Brother: On the Couch was a psychology show that aired during Big Brother 8. It lasted for an hour every week. The show was presented by Davina McCall.

== 8 Out of 10 Cats: Big Brother specials ==
8 Out of 10 Cats Big Brother specials were shown before the live final of the Channel 4 series of Big Brother. They featured evicted Big Brother housemates from the series at the time, plus housemates from the series previous to that.

Air date	Episode	Guest panellists	Studio guests
12 August 2005	Big Brother 6 Special	Jeremy Edwards, Liza Tarbuck, Derek Laud and Kieron "Science" Harvey	Nicholas Bateman, Michelle Bass, Kemal Shahin, Jade Goody, Maxwell Ward and Victor Ebuwa
18 August 2006	Big Brother 7 Special	Dom Joly, Jason Manford, Lea Walker and Grace Adams-Short	Eugene Sully, Nadia Almada, Jayne Kitt, Shahbaz Chauhdry, Mikey Dalton and Jade Goody
30 August 2007	Big Brother 8 Special	Charley Uchea, Danny Wallace, James Corden, and Gerry Stergiopoulos	Nikki Grahame, Lea Walker, Shabnam Paryani, Billi Bhatti, Tracey Barnard and Eugene Sully
5 September 2008	Big Brother 9 Special	Luke Marsden, Vanessa Feltz, Danny Wallace, Lisa Appleton and Mario Marconi	Nikki Grahame, Brian Belo, Charley Uchea, Ziggy Lichman, Belinda Harris-Reid and Rebecca Shiner
9 September 2010	Ultimate Big Brother Special	Charlie Brooker, Jarred Christmas, Josie Gibson and Brian Belo	Eugene Sully, Mario Marconi, Makosi Musambasi, Aisleyne Horgan-Wallace, John James Parton, Amanda and Sam Marchant

== Big Brother: Best Shows Ever ==
On 12 May 2020, Channel 4 announced that previous episodes of Big Brother and Celebrity Big Brother would be shown on E4, in a series titled Big Brother: Best Shows Ever to mark the 20th anniversary of the programme. The show began on 14 June 2020 for ten 75 minute episodes and was fronted by Davina McCall and Rylan Clark-Neal with guest appearances from Emma Willis, Dermot O'Leary and ex-housemates.

== Big Brother's Biggest Best Bits ==
Big Brother's Biggest Best Bits was a special compilation episode that aired on 5 October 2023. It saw new presenters AJ Odudu and Will Best look back at the history of Big Brother, prior to the relaunch of the series on ITV2. It was re-edited and repeated before the launch of the 2024 series.

== Big Brother: Late & Live ==
Big Brother: Late & Live and Celebrity Big Brother: Late & Live are the companion shows of Big Brother and Celebrity Big Brother following their relaunch on ITV in 2023 and 2024 respectively. They are both presented by AJ Odudu and Will Best and they air daily from Sunday to Friday after the main shows. Unlike the previous incarnations of the show on Channel 4 and Channel 5, the spin-off shows feature the first interview of the evicted housemate(s) upon their exit from house.

Big Brother: Late & Live was launched on 8 October 2023 and the guests were Kimberly Wyatt, Jordan Stephens and The Vivienne. Celebrity Big Brother: Late & Live was launched on 4 March 2024 and the guests were Oti Mabuse, Tom Allen, Judi Love and Big Brother 20 winner Jordan Sangha.

In November 2025, in days following the conclusion of Big Brother 22, it was reported among British tabloids that the show had been axed due to low ratings.

== Big Brother: Live Stream ==
Big Brother: Live Stream is a live feed of the Big Brother house, aired exclusively on ITVX, YouTube (and STV Player for Celebrity Big Brother) from 11pm to 2am from Sunday to Friday, and from 9pm to 2am on Saturdays.

The Day 23 live stream was officially listed on ITVX from 23:00 to 00:00 on 30 October 2023, though in reality no live stream was broadcast to avoid eviction spoilers. In its place ran a message informing viewers that there was no live stream that night.

On 2 November 2023, the live stream was stopped after an argument between housemates Paul and Trish. Instead airing footage of the house with bird sounds. No housemates were shown.

In the last civilian series, the stream had to be stopped because of the fire alarm. Footage of the house was broadcast instead with bird sounds.

Celebrity Big Brother: Live Stream accompanied Celebrity Big Brother from 2024.

In August 2026, it was announced that the live stream had been axed and would not return for the twenty-third series.

== Big Brother: The Group Chat ==
In August 2026, it was announced that Big Brother: The Group Chat, a podcast alternative hosted by GK Barry and Kate Lawler, the latter of whom won the third series of Big Brother, would accompany the twenty-third series.
