= Big Brother (British TV series) series 13 =

Coordinates: 51°39′23″N 0°16′02″W

Big Brother
- Series 13
- Series thirteen logo
- Presented by: Brian Dowling
- No. of days: 70
- No. of housemates: 17
- Winner: Luke Anderson
- Runner-up: Adam Kelly
- Companion shows: Big Brother's Bit on the Side
- No. of episodes: 73

Release
- Original network: Channel 5
- Original release: 5 June – 13 August 2012

Series chronology
- ← Previous; Series 12 Next → Series 14

Big Brother 2012, also known as Big Brother 13, is the thirteenth series of the British reality television series Big Brother, and the second series to broadcast on Channel 5. The series premiered with a live launch on 5 June 2012 and ran for 70 days, concluding on 13 August 2012. The series was originally planned to run for thirteen weeks, but was cut back to ten weeks in order to accommodate Celebrity Big Brother 10. The series was won by Luke Anderson, who won half of the £100,000 prize fund, with the remainder taken by Conor McIntyre as part of the White Room twist. Anderson is the second transgender contestant to win the show, the first being Nadia Almada who won the show back in 2004. The runner-up was Adam Kelly. The series was announced in April 2011 when Channel 5 signed a two-year contract to air the show. With Big Brother 12 having been broadcast in autumn 2011, this is the first series to air in the show's regular summer period on Channel 5 since it acquired the show from Channel 4 in 2011.

There were 16 original housemates, eight men and eight women, who all entered the house on Day 1. Shortly after the first eviction of the series, Becky Hannon, one of three wildcard housemates, was chosen by the public to enter the house on Day 4. For the first time since Big Brother 4, all housemates left the house as part of the game - no housemate left the House walked from the house for personal reasons or by being ejected. The only housemate not to be evicted by the viewer's Vote was Conor, who was bribed out of the house with half of the £100,000 prize fund as part of a Dilemma in the White Room.

Brian Dowling returned to host the main show, with Emma Willis, Alice Levine and Jamie East also returning to host spin-off show Big Brother's Bit on the Side. This series was sponsored by hair product brand Schwarzkopf Live Color XXL. Though overall ratings were higher than the previous series, the episode broadcast on Friday 27 July recorded the lowest figures in the programme's history at just 615,000 (being broadcast at the same time as the opening ceremony of the 2012 Olympics), then the episode broadcast on 12 August recorded even lower figures at just 483,000 (being broadcast at the same time as the closing ceremony).

This series sparked much controversy, with Ofcom receiving a total of 2,085 complaints regarding the bullying and intimidating behaviour from Conor McIntyre, and 50 more complaints about the same from Caroline Wharram.

== Housemates ==
On Day 1, sixteen housemates entered the House on launch night. The first housemate to enter was Deana who was chosen by random draw. She earned immunity from eviction in Week 1. On Day 4, Becky, one of three potential "wildcard" housemates, was chosen by the public to enter the House after the first evictee.

Name	Age on entry	Hometown	Day entered	Day exited	Result
Luke Anderson	31	Mynydd Isa (originally from South Africa)	1	70	Winner
Adam Kelly	27	Birmingham (originally from the United States)	1	70	Runner-up
Deana Uppal	23	Wednesbury	1	70	3rd place
Sara McLean	22	Edinburgh	1	70	4th place
Luke Scrase	24	Stoke-on-Trent	1	70	5th place
Ashleigh Hughes	20	Romford	1	67	Evicted
Scott Mason	21	Macclesfield	1	67	Evicted
Conor McIntyre	24	Derry	1	60	Bribed (Note: Conor accepted a bribe of half of the prize fund (£50,000) however by accepting the offer he had to leave the House immediately.)
Becky Hannon	19	Blackburn	4	60	Evicted
Caroline Wharram	20	Kingston upon Thames	1	53	Evicted
Lauren Carre	20	Jersey	1	46	Evicted
Shievonne Robinson	28	London	1	39	Evicted
Arron Lowe	23	Manchester	1	32	Evicted
Lydia Louisa	25	Cheshire	1	25	Evicted
Benedict Garrett	32	Manchester	1	18	Evicted
Chris James	21	Luton	1	11	Evicted
Victoria Eisermann	41	Reading	1	4	Evicted

== Nominations table ==
	Week 1	Week 2	Week 3	Week 4	Week 5	Week 6	Week 7	Week 8	Week 9	Week 10			Nominations received
	Week 1	Week 2	Week 3	Week 4	Week 5	Week 6	Week 7	Week 8	Week 9	Day 63	Final		Nominations received
Luke A.	Not eligible	Sara, Luke S	Luke S, Caroline	Luke S, Caroline	Luke S, Conor	Not eligible	Caroline, Becky	Caroline, Conor	Becky, Ashleigh	Ashleigh, Scott	Winner (Day 70)		19
Adam	Not eligible	Arron, Ashleigh	Becky, Ashleigh	Caroline, Shievonne	Caroline, Arron	Caroline, Shievonne	Caroline, Ashleigh	Caroline, Sara	Ashleigh, Becky	Ashleigh, Scott	Runner-up (Day 70)		12
Deana	Conor, Victoria, Lydia	Arron, Luke S	Arron, Lauren	Conor, Luke S	Arron, Becky	Conor, Shievonne	Conor, Ashleigh	Conor, Caroline	Conor, Ashleigh	Ashleigh, Scott	Third place (Day 70)		31
Sara	Not eligible	Lydia, Benedict	Lauren, Benedict	Luke A, Luke S	Conor, Arron	Not eligible	Luke A, Lauren	Luke S, Ashleigh	Becky, Scott	Scott, Adam	Fourth place (Day 70)		6
Luke S.	Not eligible	Chris, Deana	Luke A, Deana	Lydia, Deana	Deana, Lauren	Adam, Deana	Lauren, Luke A	Adam, Deana	Luke A, Adam	Deana, Luke A	Fifth place (Day 70)		13
Ashleigh	Not eligible	Chris, Lauren	Benedict, Lauren	Lydia, Lauren	Deana, Lauren	Not eligible	Lauren, Deana	Luke A, Deana	Adam, Luke A	Deana, Adam	Evicted (Day 67)		11
Scott	Not eligible	Chris, Benedict	Benedict, Lauren	Lydia, Adam	Conor, Luke S	Conor, Luke S	Lauren, Deana	Luke S, Deana	Luke A, Deana	Adam, Deana	Evicted (Day 67)		8
Conor	Not eligible	Deana, Lydia	Deana, Lydia	Deana, Lydia	Deana, Becky	Not eligible	Deana, Lauren	Deana, Sara	Deana, Luke A	Bribed (Day 60)			15
Becky	Not in House	Chris, Lydia	Benedict, Lauren	Lydia, Deana	Arron, Conor	Conor, Shievonne	Luke A, Lauren	Luke A, Deana	Luke A, Deana	Evicted (Day 60)			10
Caroline	Not eligible	Chris, Lauren	Benedict, Lauren	Adam, Luke A	Lauren, Adam	Not eligible	Luke A, Lauren	Adam, Luke A	Evicted (Day 53)				14
Lauren	Not eligible	Arron, Luke S	Sara, Caroline	Luke S, Deana	Arron, Scott	Not eligible	Caroline, Becky	Evicted (Day 46)					19
Shievonne	Not eligible	Caroline, Arron	Benedict, Luke A	Scott, Adam	Becky, Luke A	Not eligible	Evicted (Day 39)						5
Arron	Not eligible	Sara, Luke A	Lydia, Deana	Lydia, Deana	Becky, Deana	Evicted (Day 32)							13
Lydia	Not eligible	Arron, Deana	Arron, Deana	Conor, Shievonne	Evicted (Day 25)								12
Benedict	Not eligible	Scott, Sara	Not eligible	Evicted (Day 18)									8
Chris	Not eligible	Arron, Caroline	Evicted (Day 11)										5
Victoria	Not eligible	Evicted (Day 4)											1
Notes	1	2	3	none		4	5	6	7	7, 8	9		
Against public vote	Conor, Lydia, Victoria	Chris, Arron	Benedict, Lauren	Deana, Lydia	Arron, Becky, Conor, Deana	Conor, Shievonne	Lauren, Luke A	Adam, Ashleigh, Caroline, Conor, Deana, Luke A, Luke S, Sara	Ashleigh, Becky, Deana, Luke A	Adam, Ashleigh, Deana, Scott	Adam, Deana, Luke A, Luke S, Sara		
Walked	none								Conor (Bribed)	none			
Evicted	Victoria; 17.01% to save	Chris; 38.37% to save	Benedict; 37.64% to save	Lydia; 34.39% to save	Arron; 12.80% to save	Shievonne; 19.67% to save	Lauren; 46.20% to save	Caroline; 6.65% (out of 2) to save	Becky; 5.31% to save	Scott; 12.30% to save	Luke S 6.07% (out of 5)	Sara; 16.62% (out of 4)	
Evicted	Victoria; 17.01% to save	Chris; 38.37% to save	Benedict; 37.64% to save	Lydia; 34.39% to save	Arron; 12.80% to save	Shievonne; 19.67% to save	Lauren; 46.20% to save	Caroline; 6.65% (out of 2) to save	Becky; 5.31% to save	Ashleigh; 12.46% to save	Deana; 21.47% (out of 3)	Adam; 30.89% (out of 2)	
Survived	Lydia; 17.95% Conor; 65.04%	Arron; 61.63%	Lauren; 62.36%	Deana; 65.61%	Conor; 20.44% Becky; 21.30% Deana; 45.46%	Conor; 80.33%	Luke A 53.80%	Luke S 7.85% Ashleigh; 6.07% Conor; 14.05% Sara; 14.87% Adam; 16.66% Deana; 19.69% Luke A 23.23%	Ashleigh; 6.41% Deana; 33.72% Luke A 54.56%	Adam; 35.41% Deana; 40.11%	Luke A 35.27% to win		

Voting results here .

Notes

- ^Note 1: On launch night, Deana was randomly selected to become the first housemate to enter the house, and was immune from the first eviction. However, as part of a twist, she had to nominate three people for eviction immediately after everyone entered the house. The three housemates chosen (Conor, Lydia and Victoria) faced eviction on Day 4. Due to bad weather, the main stage outside was abandoned, and Victoria left the house via diary room. Following the eviction, a wildcard housemate was chosen by the public to enter the house as the seventeenth official housemate.
- ^Note 2: When Becky entered the house, she was set a secret mission. When the housemates stated who their favourite housemate was, Becky had to receive at least one vote otherwise she would face eviction. As she succeeded in receiving one vote, Becky could nominate but could not be nominated by her fellow housemates.
- ^Note 3: On Day 13, Benedict lost his right to nominate as a forfeit in the Timebomb task.
- ^Note 4: For the majority of Week 5 and Week 6, the house was split into two teams, Blue and Green, for a Turf Wars task. On nominations day, the team who won the diary room were the only ones permitted to nominate in Week 6. As punishment for Conor, Caroline and Ashleigh discussing nominations, Big Brother voided the Blue team's claim of the Diary Room and gave it to the Green team. Therefore, only the Green team of Adam, Becky, Deana, Luke S and Scott were eligible to nominate this week. Arron was also a member of the Green team, however he was evicted before this round of nominations took place.
- ^Note 5: Luke S, Sara and Scott won immunity during the Gold Rush shopping task and could nominate but could not be nominated by their fellow housemates. Housemates nominated face-to-face this week round the campfire in the garden using a deck of cards to choose their desired nominated housemates.
- ^Note 6: As punishment for continuous rule-breaking, every housemate that received at least one nomination was automatically put up for eviction. This resulted in everyone except Becky and Scott facing eviction. Had this not happened then Caroline, Deana and Luke A would have faced eviction. Each nominated housemate's percentages reflect their share of the vote among all 8 nominees at the time of each voting freeze. Caroline received 45.86% of the votes to save to Luke S's 54.14%.
- ^Note 7: Rather than the housemates nominating this week, housemates' friends and family nominated on their behalf. On Day 57, the White Room was introduced in which Sara, Luke S and Conor competed for a pass to the final. On Day 58, Sara chose to leave the White Room. Shortly after Becky's eviction on Day 60, the remaining White Room residents, Conor and Luke S, were offered up to half of the £100,000 prize fund. However, whoever accepted the offer would have to leave the house immediately, while the other person won immunity from the next eviction and a free pass to the final. Conor chose to take the £50,000 and left the house, while Luke S was guaranteed a place in the live final.
- ^Note 8: Luke S, holder of a free pass to the final, could nominate but could not be nominated by his fellow housemates in the final round of nominations. On Day 67, there was a double eviction.
- ^Note 9: For the last four days, the public voted for the housemate they wanted to win, rather than save. Each finalist's percentages reflect their share of the vote among all five finalists at the time of each vote freeze. Luke A won the series with 53.31% of the votes to Adam's 46.69%.

== Weekly summary ==
Week 1	Entrances	On Day 1, Deana, Arron, Caroline, Shievonne, Conor, Lauren, Luke A, Adam, Sara, Scott, Ashleigh, Luke S, Lydia, Benedict, Chris and Victoria entered the house.; On Day 4, Becky entered the house.
Week 1	Tasks	On Day 1, Deana was randomly selected to enter as the first housemate and Big Brother rewarded her with immunity from the first eviction. In exchange for this reward, she had to nominate three housemates based solely on her first impression of them. She nominated Conor, Victoria, and Lydia.; On Day 2, Shievonne was set a task in which she had to perform an impression of each of her fellow housemates. The other housemates correctly identified all of the impressions and won a party.; On Day 3, housemates took part in an organised game of spin the bottle.; On Day 4, wildcard housemate Becky entered the house, and was immediately given a secret mission. On Day 6, housemates voted for their favourite housemate. To succeed in her mission, Becky had to try and receive at least one or more vote from any of her fellow housemates. She passed, and therefore won immunity from the next eviction.
Week 1	Nominations	As Deana was rewarded with immunity, she also had to nominate three housemates. She nominated Conor, Lydia and Victoria and they faced the public vote.
Week 1	Exits	On Day 4, Victoria was evicted from the house, receiving 17.01% of the public vote to save.
Week 2	Tasks	On Day 8, housemates were given their first weekly shopping task. The task was to spend two days in the house without laughing once. Latvian comedian Gatis Kandis was featured as part of this challenge. The sailor in the booth in the living area had the results of how many fails the housemates are limited to. If they pass on Day 10, they will win a luxury food budget. The housemates were only allowed to 25 fails, the housemates ended the task with 19 and therefore won a luxury shopping budget.; On Day 10, housemates were set the task "Risk it for a biscuit". They were called to the diary room one-by-one where they found a large biscuit tin on the table, and cannot see what is inside it. Housemates will have to take a risk in order to retrieve a biscuit.; On Day 11, Caroline was given a secret mission to try and convince two other housemates that she is really related to the royal family. As she was successful, Sara and Lauren, her two targets, joined her for afternoon tea.
Week 2	Nominations	On Day 7, housemates nominated for the first time. Arron and Chris received the most nominations and faced the public vote.
Week 2	Exits	On Day 9, Scott received news that a family member had died; for this reason he left the house for a short period of time and decided to return after hearing the news.; On Day 11, Chris was evicted from the house, receiving 38.37% of the public vote to save.
Week 3	Tasks	On Day 12, housemates took part in a dance-off hosted by Lydia. Each of the housemates battled it out in a round of head-to-head dance battles. Lydia and her chosen winners of each battle attended a special party put on by Big Brother. The remaining housemates got nothing.; On Day 13, housemates were set a 'ticking time bomb' game. Conor received a takeaway for two with karaoke, and chose Arron to join him for the evening. Benedict's punishment for removing a black layer meant that he was not allowed to nominate in the upcoming nominations. Luke A was given a trip to a sweet shop, while Sara was told she had become the new house cleaner. Shievonne won a date with the housemate of her choice, picking Adam to join her, who had already been given the task of wearing giant hands for the rest of the day. Ashleigh picked Luke S to accompany her to a gym session, while Caroline had to eat a fish eye in order for her fellow housemates to win their respective gifts.; On Day 15 and 16, the second weekly shopping task took place. The three most intelligent housemates (Benedict, Luke A, and Lydia) became scientists and the rest of the housemates were lab rats. The scientists had to correctly predict the majority of outcomes of certain "experiments" that the lab rats participated in. They were successful and won a luxury shopping budget of £840.; Lydia was set a secret individual task on her birthday (Day 16). She had to make a long, winding, narcissistic birthday speech to her housemates in order to receive a call from her fiancé. She passed the task.; On Day 18, hairdryers were banned after Arron broke a rule. In order to retrieve them back, Arron had to complete a secret task. In his task he had to bestow upon the house three acts of kindness. Big Brother noted that he did a pretty rubbish job, but because Big Brother was feeling nice, one hairdryer returned to the house.
Week 3	Twists	Despite the Welcome Pack informing housemates that the discussion of nominations were allowed, on Day 16, Big Brother announced to the housemates that nomination discussion was now forbidden until further notice, and any breach of this rule would result in severe repercussions.
Week 3	Punishments	Caroline and Conor were caught discussing nominations on Day 17. As a reprimand, Big Brother turned off all the hot water in the house until further notice.; Late on Day 17, Arron put talcum powder in the hairdryers. As a result, on Day 18 Big Brother announced to the housemates that due to a fire risk, hairdryers were banned until further notice.
Week 3	Nominations	On Day 14, the housemates nominated for the second time. Benedict and Lauren received the most nominations and faced the public vote.
Week 3	Exits	On Day 18, Benedict was evicted from the house, receiving 37.64% of the public vote to save.
Week 4	Tasks	On Day 19, it was Ashleigh's birthday, and she was asked to choose two housemates to become party planners for a task. She chose Conor and Shievonne, who each had to create rival parties, with different themes, food and ideas. Ashleigh then had to decide which party is better and the winners will get the chance to party until early hours with booze and extra party treats provided by Big Brother.; On Day 20, housemates were set the task 'Confusing Cuisine'. Housemates were presented with a collection of thirteen meals, and to pass the task, each housemate had to consume the delicious delight in front of them. However, the food does not look the same as it tastes. Caroline took the role of the waitress as she was feeling unwell, and could not eat any of the meals. All housemates consumed their meals except for Deana, and therefore Deana was ineligible from receiving the 'big prize'. The housemates chose Conor to receive a prize and he therefore became sole controller of the shopping list.; On Day 22, housemates were set their third shopping task. In order to receive a premium shopping budget, housemates had to obtain 100 points by the end of the task. However, housemates were set task where they could lose and win points for the group. On the night of Day 23, housemates earned to exactly 100 points and won the task. In addition to the premium shopping budget, Big Brother awarded Conor with his own personal luxury shopping list as his privilege from the Confusing Cuisine task earlier in the week.
Week 4	Punishments	On Day 19, as punishment for allowing Benedict to leave the house with a swivel chair, Big Brother removed all seating fixtures from the house (except the Diary Room chair) until further notice.; Late on Day 19, Shievonne and Ashleigh discussed nominations. Therefore, Big Brother once again removed hot water.; On Day 20, Conor received a formal warning for his violent and threatening language against Deana.; On Day 22, housemates were punished for talking about nominations. As punishment, Big Brother confiscated all alcohol from the house until further notice.; On Day 23, Caroline received her first formal warning regarding offending language against Adam in a conversation earlier that day.; On Day 25, Deana and Scott discussed nominations shortly after Lydia's eviction. As the punishment, Big Brother removed the outdoor table football game that Conor bought in yesterday's shopping budget.
Week 4	Nominations	On Day 21, the housemates nominated for the third time. Deana and Lydia received the most nominations and faced the public vote.
Week 4	Exits	On Day 25, Lydia was evicted from the house, receiving 34.39% of the public vote to save.
Week 5	Tasks	On Day 29, housemates became two teams for seven days. In the morning, housemates were told they had to pick their best friends, and Big Brother split the pairs to make two teams of six. Shievonne, as the thirteenth housemate, was able to choose which team she joins. She joined the blue team. The blue consisted of Ashleigh, Caroline, Conor, Lauren, Luke A, Sara and Shievonne. The green team consisted of Arron, Adam, Becky, Deana, Luke S and Scott. The two teams were told they were battling for control over an area of the house, a luxury food shopping budget, and most importantly, the ability to nominate in Week 6.
Week 5	Punishments	On Day 31, Arron of the green team invaded the blue team's territory by jumping in the pool. This resolved in housemates on the green team losing both the kitchen and bathroom, leaving all housemates on basic rations for the rest of the week as well as the following week.
Week 5	Nominations	On Day 28, the housemates nominated for the fourth time. Arron, Becky, Conor and Deana received the most nominations and faced the public vote.
Week 5	Exits	On Day 32, Arron was evicted from the house, receiving 12.8% of the public vote to save.
Week 6	Tasks	The Turf Wars task continued into this week. The blue team won a secret room, wherein they could watch and listen to one housemate's conversation with Big Brother in the Diary Room; the choice of housemate was at their discretion. The blue team originally won control of the Diary Room, but forfeited control to the green team.; This week's shopping task was called Rules Are For Fools. Big Brother established new rules – which were stringent and ridiculous – for the housemates to follow for the duration of the task; in addition, three housemates were made wardens to enforce obedience to the rules. If the wardens overlooked a violation of the rule, or unfairly handed out violation tickets, the whole house incurred a fail. Also, if any housemate acquired two violation tickets, they had to proceed to the punishment area to paint coal white, and then paint it black again. The housemate incurred three fails, however, because Big Brother allowed for zero fails, the house failed this week's shopping task, and earned an economy budget for the week. However, because Luke S was named the Employee of the Week for handing out the most violation tickets, he was given £50 to personally spend on a select list of luxury items. He chose a pamper treatment for Ashleigh.
Week 6	Punishments	As punishment for Conor, Caroline and Ashleigh discussing nominations, Big Brother voided the blue team's claim of the Diary Room and gave it to the green team. Therefore, only the green team of Adam, Becky, Deana, Luke S, and Scott was eligible to nominate this week.
Week 6	Nominations	On Day 35, only the green team was eligible to nominate this week. Conor and Sheivonne received the most nominations and faced the public vote.
Week 6	Exits	On Day 39, Sheivonne was evicted from the house, receiving 19.67% of the public vote to save.
Week 7	Tasks	Housemates competed in this week's shopping task: The Good, The Bad, and The Really Ugly. Housemates were divided into three teams: The Good (Luke S, Sara, Scott), The Bad (Adam, Deana, Ashleigh), and The Really Ugly (Luke A, Lauren, Becky), with Conor and Caroline being Sheriff and Deputy respectively, to compete in a gold-panning challenge, with the amount of time they are given depending on how well they do in three mini-challenges. Each win would add 30 seconds to their base time of 1 minute in the final challenge. The winners of the final challenge would receive immunity from this week's eviction. However, if the house collectively pans an amount of gold that exceeds a predetermined amount set by Big Brother, they will pass the shopping task, and earn a premium shopping budget. They failed this part of the task, and as a result received an economy shopping budget for the week.; Task / Synopsis / Winners; Raw Hide / The housemates took part in a shoot-em-up task. The winner was decided by the Sheriff and Deputy, based on who they thought hit their target the most times in 15 seconds. / The Good; The Hoedown / The teams had to choreograph their own individual dance routine to a live ukulele band, with the winner decided by the Sheriff. The music for the dance routine was Ring of Fire performed by D'Ukes ukulele band. The band had also pre-recorded a version of the song which the housemates listened to in order to rehearse their dance routines. / The Really Ugly; Spaghetti Western / The teams had to consume as much spaghetti as they possibly could, with the winners being the ones who ate the most. / The Good; Gold Rush / The teams were given a set amount of time to pan for gold in a makeshift river. The Good were given 2 minutes, The Really Ugly were given 1 minute 30 seconds, and The Bad were given 1 minute. / The Good; On Day 43, Becky was set a secret mission to hide tokens around the house. Scott was also given a secret mission to find these tokens and bring them back to the diary room. Scott only found one in the hour he was given and failed his mission. This task was not broadcast on Channel 5 during the episode on Wednesday 18 July.; On Day 44, Sara was set a task 'Speed Dater' in which she had to go on dates with all the male housemates and was told that she had to buzz a housemate when she did not want to continue with the date. However, the real task, 'Speed Hater', was revealed to all male housemates in which the housemate buzzed out the quickest will win a 'Lads Night In' with the person of their choice. Luke A won the task with only 17 seconds and chose Adam to join him in the task room with food and entertainment.
Week 7	Punishments	As punishment for Conor and Deana discussing nominations after Shievonne's eviction on Day 39, Big Brother made them in charge of washing all their housemates' laundry.; As punishment for housemates discussing nominations on four occasions on Day 42, Big Brother once again removed the hot water from the house.; On Day 42, Deana was given her first formal warning after using possibly offensive language towards fellow housemate Adam.; Sara and Lauren were forced to wear T-shirts that said "I Can't Be Trusted" and "I Discuss Nominations" as punishment for discussing nominations on Day 43.; On Day 43, Caroline was given a second formal warning after bullying and intimidating behaviour towards fellow housemate Luke A.; On Day 44, Ashleigh was given her first formal warning after a possibly offensive impersonation of Deana. Scott was also given his third and final warning for the same reasons.
Week 7	Nominations	All the housemates nominated for the fifth time. Due to winning immunity in the "Gold Rush" task, Luke S, Sara and Scott were immune from being nominated. Lauren and Luke A received the most nominations and faced the public vote.
Week 7	Exits	On Day 46, Lauren was evicted from the house, receiving 46.20% of the public vote to save.
Week 8	Tasks	For this week's shopping task, the housemates were tasked to engage in various "party"-themed tasks, like a slumber party pillow fight, a highbrow discussion dinner party, an all-night dance party, and political debates and election. They also were required to celebrate the "New Year" whenever Big Brother played a countdown into the house. They passed the task and received a premium shopping budget, which Caroline spent entirely on chocolate.; On Day 48, housemates had the chance to win letters from home, in the 'Letter Dilemmas' task. Housemates were set various tasks, including Caroline having to eat a fish eye, Luke A not being allowed to smoke, Conor having to wear a gag, Scott having to talk in a Macclesfield accent, and Sara having to dress as Queen Elizabeth II for a day. Ashleigh was the only person to not pass her task, as she swore within less than a minute. As a result of this, she did not win Deana's letter. However, during the housemates' pool party, Ashleigh was set a task to become a clown and entertain her fellow housemates. She passed this task, and won Deana's letter.; On Day 53, Conor celebrated his birthday in the house. To win a football-themed birthday party, he had to lie to all of his fellow housemates (the lies included, 'I once won a talent show with my comedy version of Riverdance', 'I once worked as a male escort' and 'I plan to move to Hollywood to be an action hero'). He successfully passed this task and won the party.; On Day 54, housemates participated in the 'Standing on the Shoulders of Prizes' endurance task, which saw the housemates try to stand on boxes for the longest time possible. Before the task, Adam was given the task of choosing which prize would go to which housemate. Adam won the task after Deana stepped off her box after thirteen hours, and won himself a 50-inch TV.
Week 8	Nominations	The housemates nominated for the sixth time. Adam, Ashleigh, Caroline, Conor, Deana, Luke A, Luke S and Sara received the most nominations and faced the public vote.
Week 8	Exits	On Day 53, Caroline was evicted from the house, receiving 6.65% (out of 2) of the public vote to save.
Week 9	Tasks	On Day 57, Big Brother asked the four housemates (Conor, Luke S, Sara, and Scott) with the least nomination votes that week to decide which three of them would enter the White Room. Conor, Luke S, and Sara participated. Their task was to remain in the White Room for as long as possible; anyone deciding to leave must push a red button signalling their desire to exit. Whilst in the White Room, they were to only wear white clothes, and eat white food. The housemate who lasted the longest in the White Room would receive an automatic pass to the final.; The housemates in the main house competed against the housemates in the White Room in a trio of challenges for this week's shopping task. As the main house failed to beat the White Room housemates, the shopping task was failed, and an economy shopping budget was allotted for the week.; On Day 58, the White Room housemates had to choose one of them to voluntarily leave and forfeit a chance at a pass to the final. Sara chose to leave.; On Day 58, the housemates were set a Musical Charades task, in which the main house had to act out the lyrics to certain songs, with the White Room housemates guessing them. Success meant a special reward for the White Room, whilst failure would result in punishment. The White Room failed, and were forced to cut up onions and fit them into a tube for one hour as punishment.; Shortly after Becky's eviction on Day 60, the two remaining housemates in the White Room – Conor and Luke S – were offered the chance to steal up to half of the prize fund in exchange for leaving the house. If neither of them chose to take the money, then the prize fund would have remained at £100,000, and the main house would determine who would win the pass to the final.
Week 9	Punishments	On Day 58, Scott was given another warning from Big Brother after again mocking Deana's Indian culture.
Week 9	Nominations	This week, the housemates' friends and family nominated on their behalf. Ashleigh, Becky, Deana and Luke A received the most nominations and faced the public vote.
Week 9	Exits	On Day 60, Becky was evicted from the house, receiving 5.31% of the public vote to save.; After Becky's eviction, Conor (whilst in the White Room) chose to take £50,000 out of the prize fund in exchange for leaving the house immediately.
Week 10	Tasks	On Day 61, the housemates were set a task called "Magic Potions". Each housemate except Adam and Scott (who decided not to participate) was given a 'magic potion' to take, unknown to what power they have been given. To pass the task, they must correctly guess the potion they consumed according to each of the other housemates behaviour.; Also this week, Scott was set a secret task. He had to pretend that he had been working for Big Brother from day one. He fooled his fellow housemates and passed the task, winning a party with naked butlers for himself, Adam, Luke A and Sara. (Ashleigh, Deana and Luke S were banned as they discussed nominations).; Housemates participated in 'The Nommy Awards', based on the housemates' nominations. As Luke S received the most awards, he won a meal cooked by Atul Kochhar for himself and three other housemates. He chose Ashleigh, Sara and Scott.; For the final shopping task of the series, Scott and Sara portrayed museum guards, with Adam, Ashleigh, Deana, Luke A and Luke S portraying the museum exhibits. Scott and Sara believed the aim of the task was to make sure the exhibits remained still and silent, but the other housemates knew the true aim. They were allowed to have several treats, including a meal and a silent disco, but had to do so without the guards finding out (they were watching looped footage). The housemates failed the task after the guards discovered the looped footage and therefore received an economy budget for the final week.
Week 10	Punishments	On Day 63, Deana discussed nominations by communicating with housemates Adam and Luke A in code. While other housemates were nominating, Ashleigh and Luke S also discussed nominations on separate occasions. Therefore, Ashleigh, Deana and Luke S could not attend a party later that night.
Week 10	Nominations	On Day 63, the housemates nominated for the seventh and final time. Adam, Ashleigh, Deana and Scott received the most nominations and faced the public vote.
Week 10	Exits	On Day 67, Scott and Ashleigh were evicted from the house, receiving 12.3% and 12.46% of the public vote to save.; On Day 70, Luke S left the house in fifth place, Sara left the house in fourth place and Deana left the house in third place. It was revealed that Luke A was the winner, leaving Adam as the runner-up.

== Production ==
=== Auditions ===
Auditions for the series returned to London and Manchester, as well as Glasgow and Cardiff for the first time since the show's move to Channel 5, in February 2012. Auditionees could also submit a video to YouTube to be fast-tracked to the producers interviews. On 10 May, pictures were released of potential housemates being moved into a café in London, whilst having blankets over their heads and bodies to hide their identity. Jamie East and Brian Dowling were also there.

=== Trailers ===
On 15 May, Channel 5 aired a 60-second advert for the series. It features an Olympic-style theme promoting the 2012 Summer Olympics in London, with famous Big Brother tasks being included and Dowling, East, Emma Willis and Alice Levine overlooking a Big Brother stadium before Dowling calls "Let the fun and games begin!".

On 1 June, during an interview on Loose Women, Dowling and Willis announced that 16 housemates would enter on launch night. A further housemate will be chosen by public vote from a choice of three "wildcards" selected by East and will enter the house during a live show on Day 4. The three potential contestants – Becky, Bhavesh and Anthony – were announced and confirmed during the Big Brother: The Auditions broadcast. The title sequence for the series consisted of a series of spinning coloured blocks which included the original sixteen housemates faces. Becky Hannon, the wildcard was not included in the titles due to her entrance on Day 4.

=== Sponsorships ===
The series sponsor was hair product brand Schwarzkopf Live Color XXL. The deal was reportedly worth £2 million. During the opening titles, a product placement logo is visible in the upper-right hand corner, and at the end of the closing credits, it is seen that not only is the hair product brand Schwarzkopf used as product placement, but also the supermarket Morrisons, which is where the housemates receive their weekly shopping from.

=== Eye Logo ===
For Series 13 the eye was exactly the same shape and size as the previous series. The centre of the eye was a 3D purple sphere that had a white glowing pupil. The rest of the eye was separated into multi-coloured sections that would rotate and spin during the title sequence, at the beginning and end and also when the day and time was being announced by narrator Marcus Bentley.

=== The House ===
The house followed a completely different theme from its previous celebrity series, following a glitzy Las Vegas theme, and was announced to be the largest Big Brother House ever. The House stairs featured another make-over with the spiral stairs being removed from 2011 and the previous Celebrity Series, and replaced by a straight staircase. The Diary Room is situated below the stairs as with every series since 2008, featuring a royal themed Diary Room Chair. The Living Area features a set of sofa seats, as well as the Memory Wall which features squares for Housemates Faces. Each time a housemate was evicted, their face on the Memory Wall went red to signify their eviction.

The Kitchen is to the right of the Dining Table, where the 2011 Bathroom was situated. It features a black design with a breakfast bar and the Store Room. The Bedroom is accessed via the Garden or Corridor in the Living Area. The Bedroom carries a Vegas Showgirl theme throughout with the walls being covered in images of showgirls and shiny textures. There is space for 16 Housemates. The Bathroom is directly opposite the bedroom through the Garden and can only be accessed via the Garden. It features a cave like wall design as well as a posh royal design. It has a Shower and Bathtub.

The Garden structure remains mainly unchanged from 2011, with the pool being situated in the same place. A Hot Tub has been added near the end of the pool, while the Smoking Area is directly at the bottom. There is an outdoor Dining Area, seating area and water feature in the Garden.

During the 'Turf Wars' task, a secret room was revealed to the Blue Team situated off the Living Area. The room was used again as part of the Museum shopping task where Housemates were instructed to go in order to receive treats. The House still features the Large Task Room which is situated in the Garden, and the Small Task Room which is accessed via the Diary Room.

==== The White Room ====
Situated in the corner of the garden, a mysterious 'White Corridor' appeared on Day 57 in which three housemates were to compete in order to win a free pass to the Final. In receiving the fewest nomination votes that week, Conor, Luke S, Sara and Scott had to decide which three of them would move into the white room. With Scott dropping out, Conor, Luke S and Sara entered The White Room. Soon after entering The White Room, the white housemates competed against the main house in several challenges. If the housemates in the main house failed to win 2 out of the 3 challenges, the housemates will only receive an economy shopping budget. The three challenges are as follows:

- In the first challenge the main housemates and the white housemates were shown a diagram of 26 cups, with some of them including paint balls. All housemates had to do was hit the cups that didn't have the paint balls in them. The white housemates won.
- In the second challenge white housemates took on the main housemates in a mind test in which they were given statements housemates made on their application forms. Ashleigh won the task for the main housemates.
- With the current scores tied, the third challenge took place, in which Deana and Luke S went head to head in a test of agility in which they had to pour milk into a long glass tube whilst in body wire which made it hard for housemates to move. Luke S won and therefore the main housemates received an economy shopping budget, whilst the white housemates, Conor, Luke S and Sara won luxury white foods.

On Day 58, housemates in The White Room were told they now had to eliminate someone from the group. Sara volunteered to leave and therefore Conor and Luke S remained in The White Room. As a result, for losing a task in which the white housemates had to guess what the main housemates were dancing to, Conor and Luke S received a punishment: slicing onions and putting them in a bucket in the middle of the room until it reached the top.

On Day 60, the true nature of the White Room task was revealed, when Conor and Luke S were faced with a dilemma. The two housemates were presented with half of the winner's £100,000 prize fund, and were informed that pressing their button would allow them to receive some of the money, at the price of their place in the house. Not accepting the offer would result in the housemate returning to the house with a guaranteed pass to the final night. Starting at £0, the amount of money that one of the two would receive rose over one minute, before reaching a five-second countdown at £50,000. The first housemate to hit his buzzer would leave the house with the amount displayed at the time he pressed the button. Despite initially seeming to encourage Luke S to hit the buzzer, upon seeing his opponent prepare to hit the buzzer, Conor swiped at the last moment, winning £50,000 and leaving the house moments later. For being the last housemate to hit his button Luke S earned a guaranteed pass to the final night of the series.

=== Wildcard housemates ===
Eight potential wildcards were moved to a nearby café in London to take part in several memorable Big Brother challenges, more significantly the Electric Shock task from Big Brother 9. Jamie East and Big Brother 7 housemate Nikki Grahame were present during the run. When all challenges were completed, Jamie had to choose three wildcards to become potential housemates. He chose flute-player Anthony, 'Indian Brian Dowling' Bhavesh, and Becky, who is nicknamed 'The Hurricane' by her friends. All three faced a vote held via the Channel 5 website in which Becky received the most votes to enter the house and therefore entered on Day 4.

== Ratings and reception ==
=== Television ratings ===
Official ratings are taken from BARB.

	Week 1		Week 2	Week 3	Week 4	Week 5	Week 6	Week 7	Week 8	Week 9	Week 10
Saturday		1.58	1.4	1.58	1.3	1.34	1.38	1.05	1.18	0.94	1.17
Sunday		1.67	1.6	1.16	1.48	1.62	1.14	1.42	1.42	1.22	0.79
Monday		1.75	1.64	1.48	1.63	1.63	1.51	1.22	1.36	1.3	1.72
Tuesday	2.93	1.83	1.69	1.66	1.69	1.64	1.44	1.41	1.64	1.38	
Wednesday	1.8	1.76	1.74	1.54	1.81	1.56	1.49	1.4	1.46	1.21	
Thursday	1.85	1.92	1.8	1.74	1.51	1.62	1.41	1.54	1.44	1.46	
Friday	1.67	1.83	1.58	1.58	1.84	1.8	1.59	1.02	1.66	1.39	
Friday					1.48	1.43	1.29				
Weekly average	1.87		1.64	1.53	1.59	1.58	1.41	1.29	1.45	1.27	1.23
Running average	1.87		1.78	1.71	1.68	1.66	1.62	1.58	1.57	1.54	1.52
Series average	1.52										

=== Controversy and criticism ===
Since Day 1, housemates could openly discuss nominations. This decision was highly criticised. The nominations rule has previously made appearances in the first week of Celebrity Big Brother 8, from the fifth week in Big Brother 12 onwards, and the whole series of Celebrity Big Brother 9. On 20 June, a poll was released on to channel5.com for the public to vote whether or not housemates should discuss nominations. With over 90% of the vote saying housemates should not discuss nominations, the rule was changed back to housemates being forbidden from discussing nominations as revealed to the housemates on Day 16.

Two housemates in Big Brother 13, Conor McIntyre and Caroline Wharram, have been criticised with numerous accounts of bullying between other fellow housemates. Media regulator Ofcom received nearly 1,000 complaints. According to Broadcast, media regulator Ofcom received 356 complaints about Conor's comments towards Deana on 25 June episode by midnight on the night of transmission, and the figure later rose to over 1,000.

Furthermore, Caroline received criticism when she branded Adam "a gorilla" after a task which saw him spinning her around on a roundabout. Caroline moaned about the former LA gangster: "Adam is just a gorilla, he's not even funny. He snores like a family of dragons, it's just rude."

Talking about her Sick n' Mix task with Adam, Caroline told Scott Mason: "I just don't understand why he had to do it, fucking wanker. He's horrible. He's just a ridiculous gorilla, bowl haircut, no sanitation, he's just disgusting." Ofcom has confirmed that they received 50 complaints over the jibe, despite Big Brother's formal warning to Caroline over the remarks. The show's executive producer said on 29 June: "There would be very serious consequences for Conor or for any housemate if they were to continue to use language that was unacceptable like that within the House."
