= Finglas =

Outer suburb of Dublin, Ireland

Finglas Fionnghlas (Irish)
- Suburb
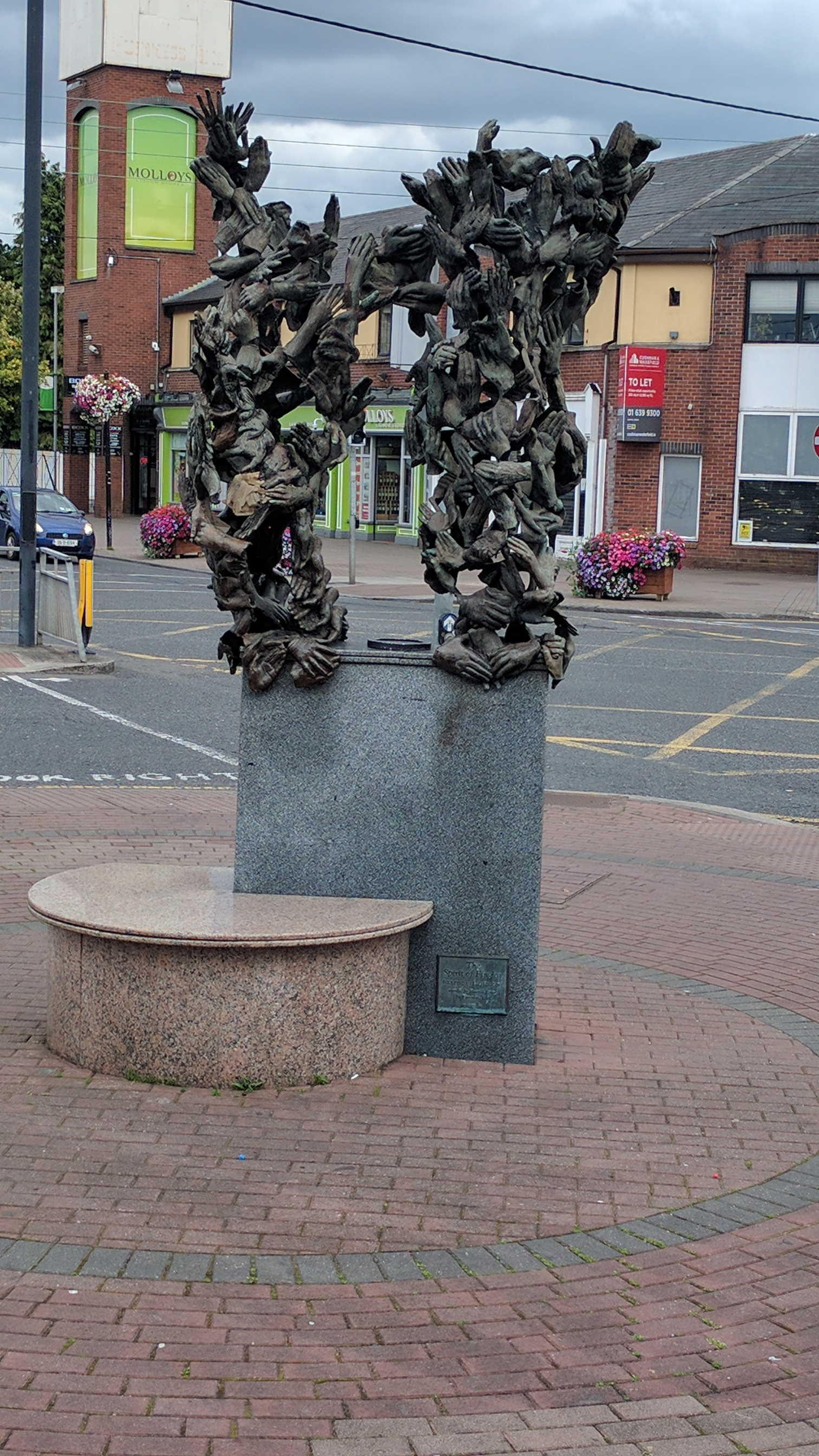
- The Spirit of Finglas sculpture

- Location in Ireland Finglas (Dublin)
- Coordinates: 53°23′25″N 6°17′59″W
- Country: Ireland
- Province: Leinster
- Local government area: Dublin City Council

Population
  - Estimate (2019): 32,000
- Eircode routing key: D11

Finglas (/ˈfɪŋɡləs/; Irish: Fionnghlas, meaning 'clear streamlet') is a northwestern outer suburb of Dublin, Ireland. It lies close to Junction 5 of the M50 motorway, and the N2 road. Nearby suburbs include Glasnevin and Ballymun; Dublin Airport is seven km (4.3 mi) to the north. Finglas lies mainly in the postal district of Dublin 11.

Finglas is the core of a civil parish of the same name in the barony of Castleknock.

== Name ==
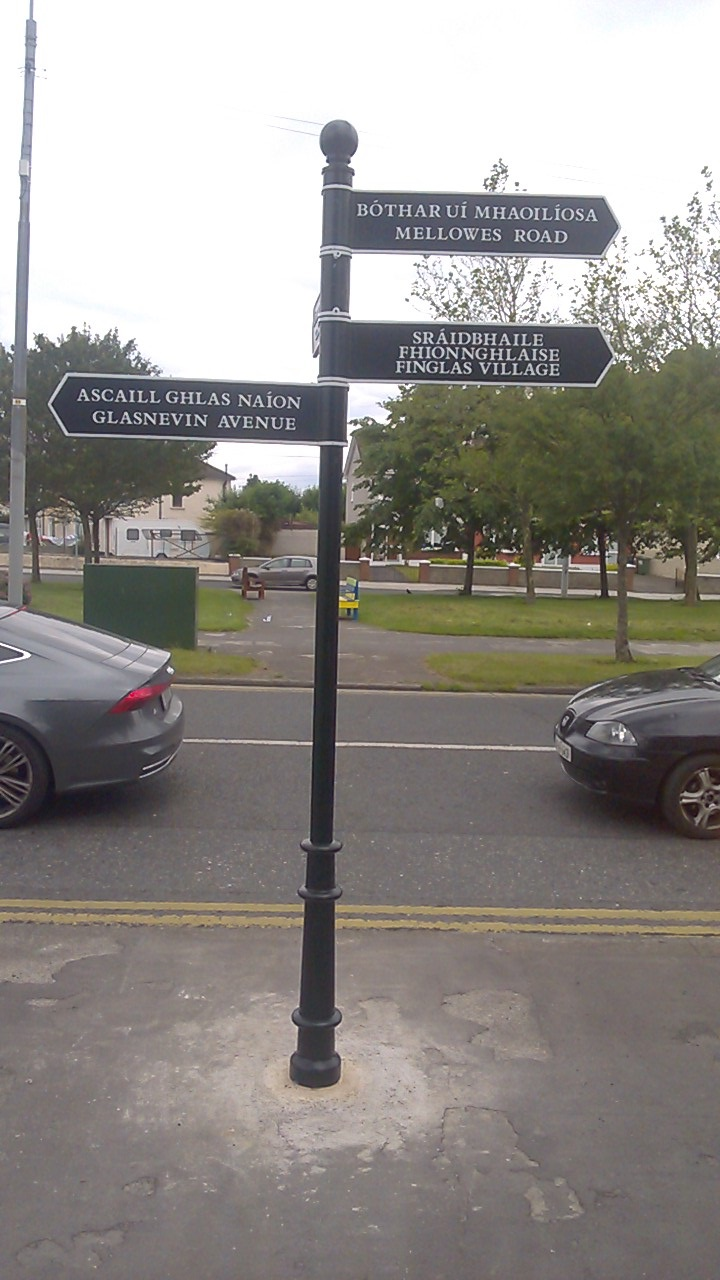
Bilingual signs in Finglas

The name Finglas (Irish: Fionnghlas), meaning clear streamlet, is derived from the Finglas River, which passed through the historic settlement.

== Geography ==
The centre of Finglas lies on a rise overlooking the valley of the River Tolka, at an altitude of 59 metres (194 ft). The Tolka runs through western and southern Finglas, and forms part of the boundary between Finglas and Glasnevin. Flowing from the north is the stream, the Finglas River, for which the area is named, forming in turn from branches from the townlands of Grange and Kildonan to the north. After meeting a tributary, the St. Margaret's Road Stream, the Finglas flows through the village centre in a culvert, and along the eastern side of Finglas Road, joining the Tolka at Finglas Bridge. To the west of the village centre rises the Finglaswood Stream, which joins the River Tolka via an Integrated Constructed Wetland near a small civic golf course.

=== Climate ===
Finglas has an oceanic climate (Köppen: Cfb).

Climate data for Finglas
Month	Jan	Feb	Mar	Apr	May	Jun	Jul	Aug	Sep	Oct	Nov	Dec	Year
Mean daily maximum °C (°F)	8.1 (46.6)	8.6 (47.5)	9.9 (49.8)	11.9 (53.4)	14.7 (58.5)	17.3 (63.1)	18.8 (65.8)	18.6 (65.5)	16.9 (62.4)	13.8 (56.8)	10.5 (50.9)	8.6 (47.5)	13.1 (55.7)
Daily mean °C (°F)	6.1 (43.0)	6.3 (43.3)	7.2 (45.0)	9.0 (48.2)	11.7 (53.1)	14.4 (57.9)	15.9 (60.6)	15.7 (60.3)	14.0 (57.2)	11.4 (52.5)	8.4 (47.1)	6.6 (43.9)	10.6 (51.0)
Mean daily minimum °C (°F)	4.0 (39.2)	4.0 (39.2)	4.6 (40.3)	6.1 (43.0)	8.6 (47.5)	11.3 (52.3)	13.0 (55.4)	13.0 (55.4)	11.4 (52.5)	9.1 (48.4)	6.2 (43.2)	4.6 (40.3)	8.0 (46.4)
Average precipitation mm (inches)	59.6 (2.35)	53.3 (2.10)	53.3 (2.10)	54.9 (2.16)	66.0 (2.60)	67.6 (2.66)	74.9 (2.95)	76.4 (3.01)	67.5 (2.66)	82.3 (3.24)	80.6 (3.17)	71.9 (2.83)	808.3 (31.83)
Source: Weather.Directory

== History ==
=== Early history ===
Finglas was originally the site of an Early Christian abbey, the origin of which has been associated, from early times, with the name of St. Cainnech, or Canice, the patron of Kilkenny, said to have founded it in 560 A.D. According to an ancient legend, the ground on which Finglas stands had been sanctified by St. Patrick, who is said to have uttered a prophecy that a great town would arise at the ford of hurdles in the vale beneath. The Nethercross from the first abbey can be seen today in the old graveyard.

St. Canice is said to have been born at Glengiven near Derry. Several primary schools and churches in the area have been named after Canice, including the local Church of Ireland church (built in 1843) and Roman Catholic church (built in 1920 on the site of a much earlier mass house).

=== Early modern period ===
The Finglas or Finglass family, who were prominent in the legal profession and in politics in the sixteenth century, took their name from the district. The family were recorded in Termonfeckin and Dublin but many of them had by the mid-1700s taken up residence in Drogheda (where they participated in the 1798 Rebellion); newspaper accounts report their opening up the Boyne River for salmon fishing.

In 1649, the Duke of Ormonde used Finglas as a staging post for his army before launching an unsuccessful Siege of Dublin.

Following the Battle of the Boyne in 1690, Finglas was used as a camp for four days by William of Orange en route to Dublin city. While there he issued the Declaration of Finglas, offering a pardon for many of James II's defeated supporters.

For almost two centuries, Finglas was well known for its "May Games" to celebrate May Day and the coming of spring, and its maypole "was one of the last to survive in Dublin", according to historian Michael J. Tutty. Throughout the eighteenth century, the Finglas maypole was at the centre of a week of festivity which included "the playing of games, various competitions, and, according to one account the crowning of 'Queen of the May'." In a letter written by Major Sirr dated 2 May 1803, he writes:

"Godfrey and I went to Finglass and found everything in order. Major Wilkinson, who resides, there, waited upon me... and told me there was not the smallest occasion for military aid nor was there the least possibility of any disturbance... I ordered the guard to return to Dublin and these gentlemen and their families seemed quite rejoiced that the old custom of Maying was not to be interrupted in Finglass where that amusement has been kept up for a century past without ever being curbed before".

=== 20th century onwards ===
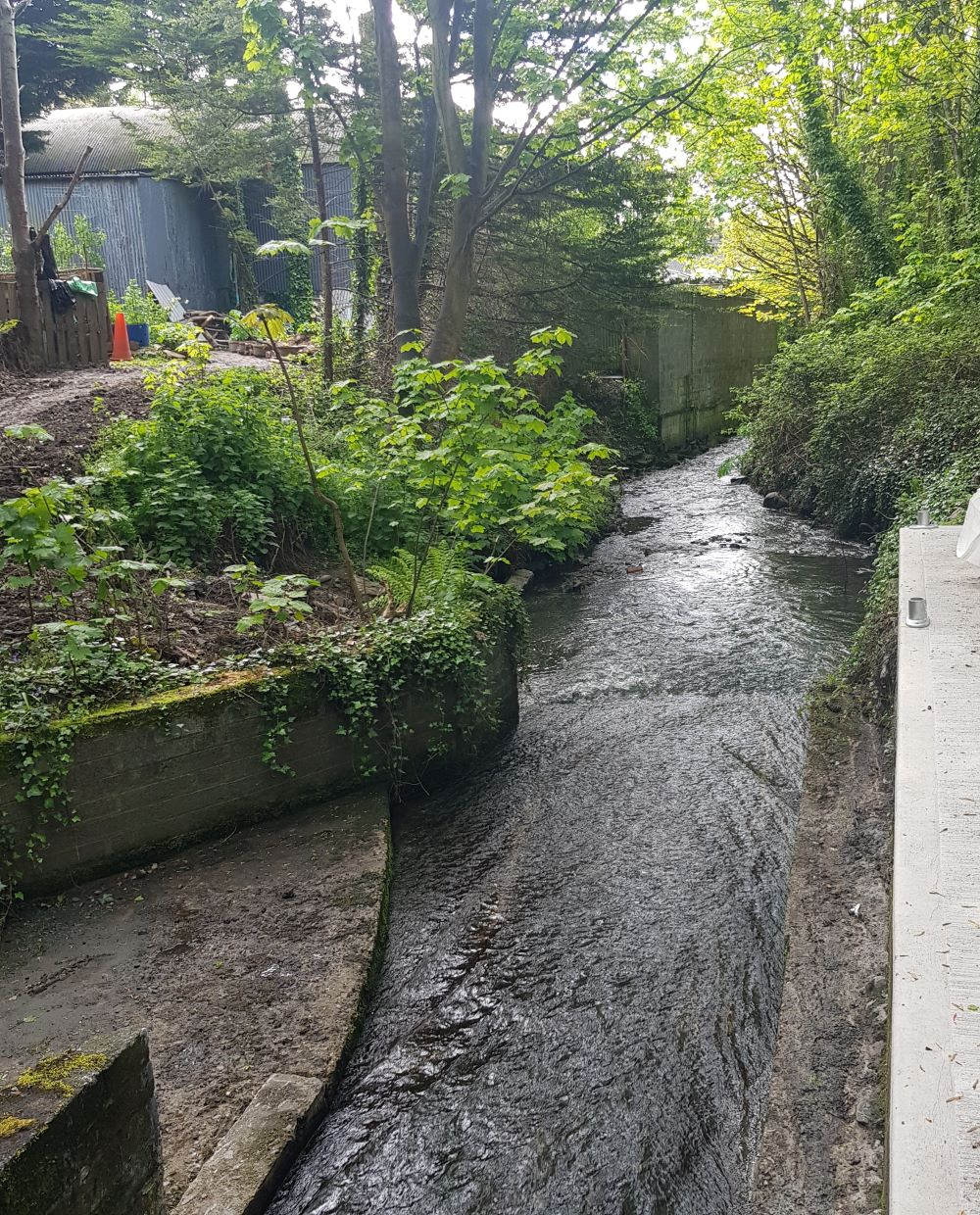
The Finglas River, for which the area is named; a tributary of the Tolka

In 1932, Ireland's first commercial airport was set up at Kildonan in Finglas. It was the site for the first Irish commercial aircraft, a Desoutter Mark II aircraft "EI-AAD", and the first commercial air taxi service, the Iona National Air Taxis and Flying School.

In the 1950s, Finglas was developed with extensive housing estates, to rehouse many north inner-city Dublin residents. Many of these estates, particularly in Finglas West, were named after prominent Irish republicans from early 20th-century Irish history, including Barry, Casement, Plunkett, Mellows, McKee, Clune and Clancy.

== Amenities ==
In the village centre is a range of shops, including one of the first-established Superquinn stores (since rebranded as SuperValu), banking facilities, pubs and restaurants. To the north are several light industrial estates.

Charlestown Shopping Centre and Clearwater Shopping Centre, are located outside the village core, to the north and south of Finglas respectively.

Finglas is home to one of Dublin's four Road Safety Authority Driving Testing Centres, which is located in Jamestown Business Park.

The Finglas Maypole Arts Festival was launched in 2019. In its first year, the festival committee was part of a steering group that got the first blue plaque in Finglas – to honour the uileann piper Séamus Ennis.

== Education ==
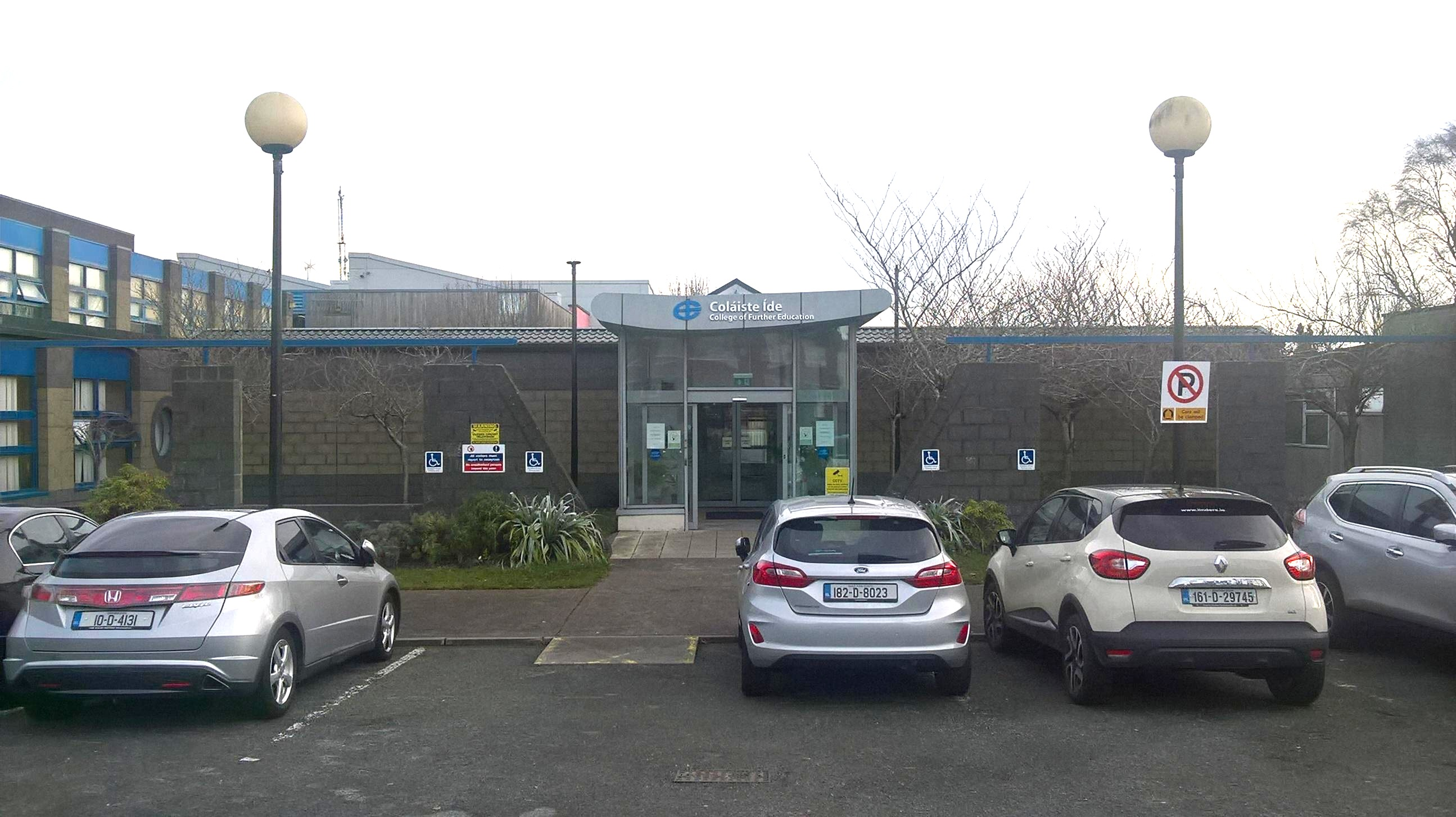
City of Dublin FET College Íde

There are 13 primary and national schools in the Finglas area, and 6 secondary schools. Coláiste Íde College of Further Education is located in Finglas West and offers third-level courses.

== Economy ==
Finglas has a mixed local economy encompassing retail, light industrial, logistics, and service-sector employment. The area is home to several business parks, including Jamestown Business Park and Finglas Business Centre, which support warehousing, small-scale manufacturing, and commercial logistics. Retail employment is concentrated around the Charlestown and Clearwater shopping centres. Strategic planning initiatives have identified the Jamestown area as a priority zone for regeneration, compact growth, and enhanced economic development.

== Sports ==
The Rugby Union club Unidare RFC and the GAA club Erin's Isle are based in the area. Soccer clubs include Tolka Rovers F.C., Valley Park United, WFTA Football Club, Willows FC, Finglas Celtic FC, Rivermount Football Club and Beneavin F.C.

== Transport ==
Finglas is served by a number of bus routes operated by Dublin Bus and Go-Ahead Ireland. These include the 23, 24, L89, F1, F2, F3, N2, N4, N6, 40D, 40E, & 220. The main route serving the area is the number F3 which runs between Charlestown Shopping Centre and Limekiln Avenue via Dublin city centre. The 40E was introduced from Tyrellstown to provide a direct link to the extended Luas Green Line in Broombridge. The 88N Nitelink service also serves the area. Two Bus Éireann routes serve Finglas, passing along the main Finglas Road, including the 103 from Duleek/Kilmoon Cross/Ashbourne to the city centre.

== Representation and governance ==
Finglas is in the jurisdiction of Dublin City Council, and for local elections it is part of the Finglas-Ballymun local electoral area.

Finglas is part of the Dublin North-West constituency for elections to Dáil Éireann.

The civil parish of Finglas is a civil parish in the barony of Castleknock.

== Notable people ==
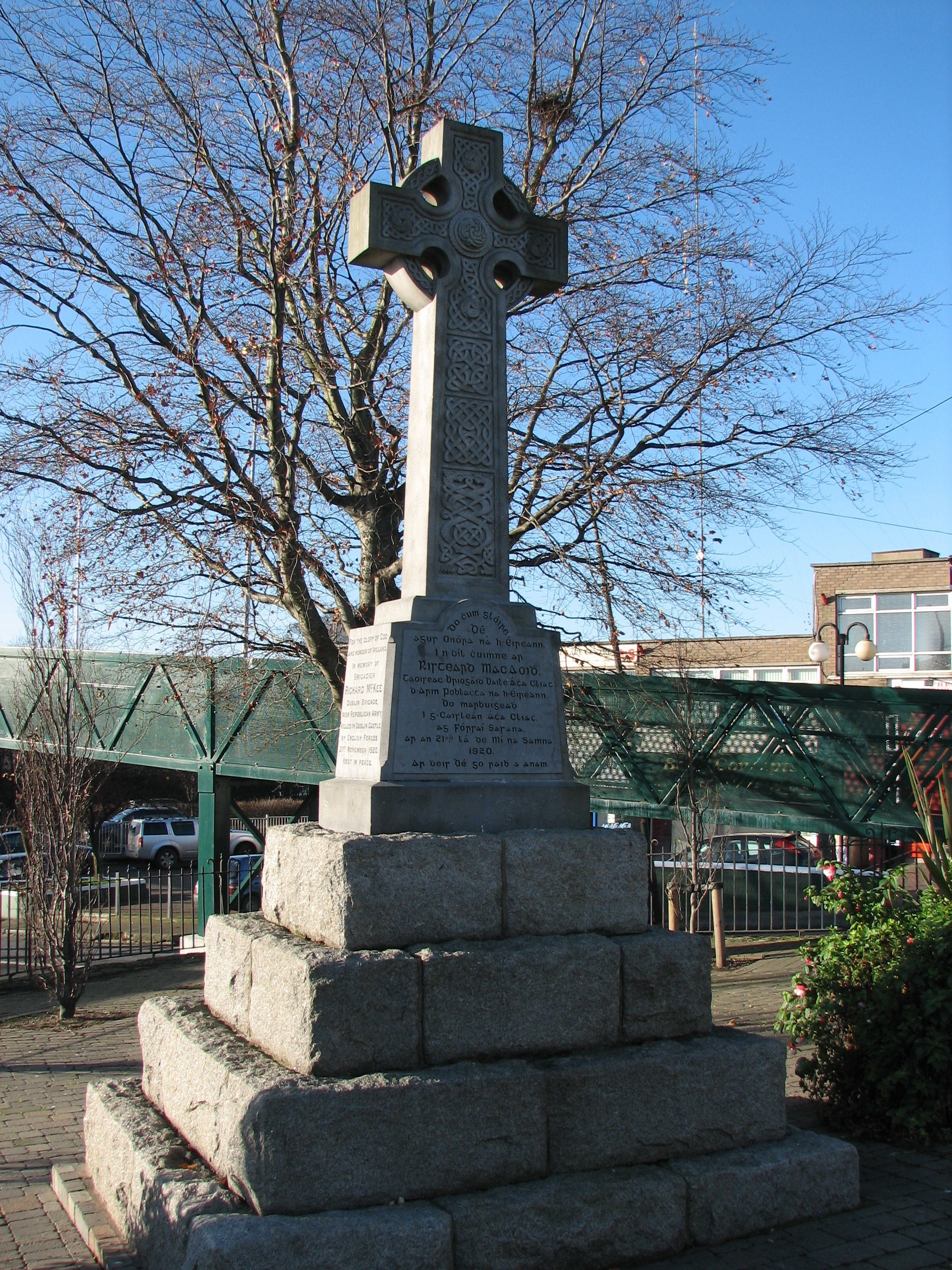
Dick McKee Memorial Finglas Village

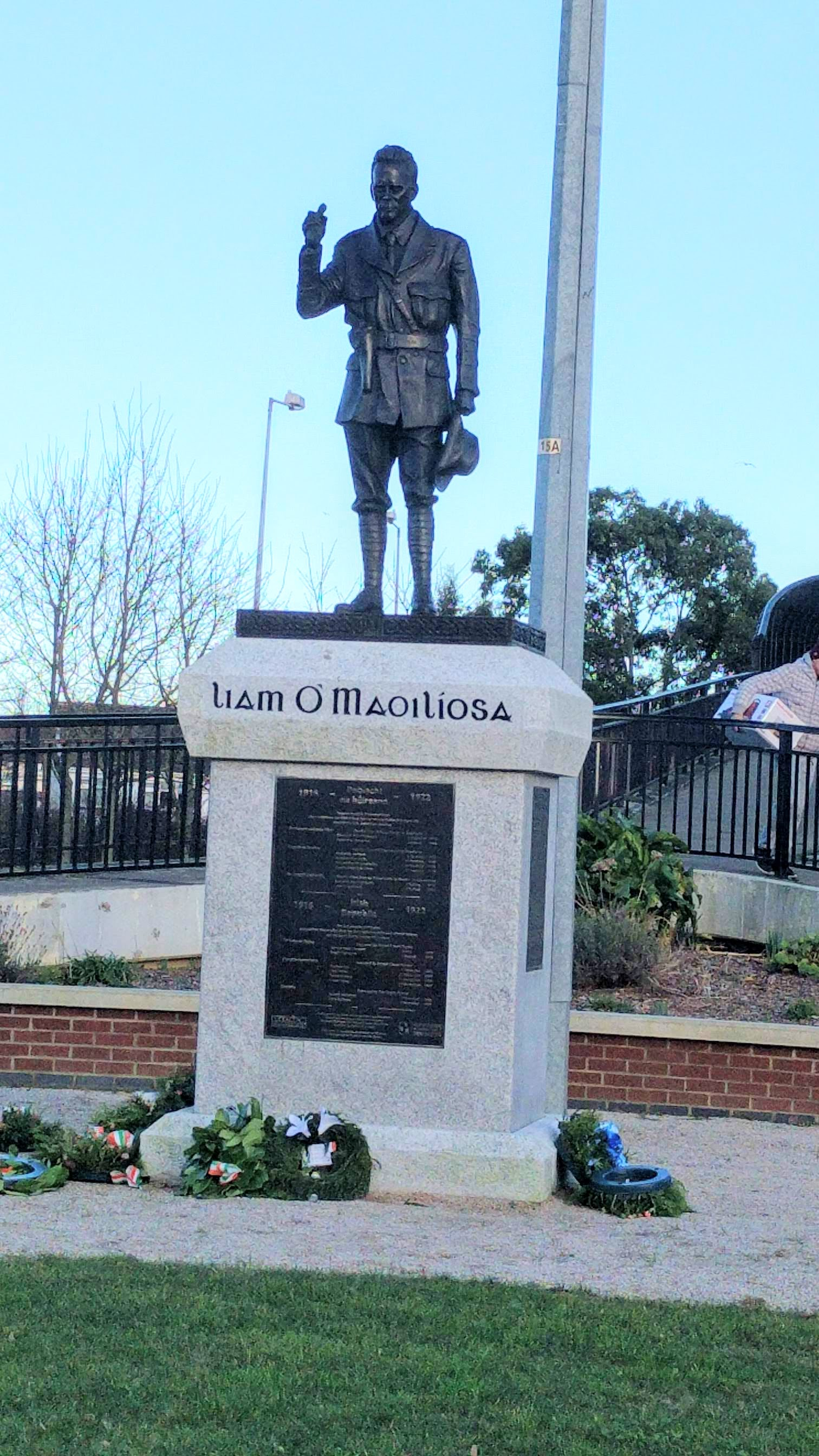
Liam Mellows memorial

Finglas has been the home of a number of notable figures, including:

- Dermot Bolger, writer and poet, whose novels The Woman's Daughter and Night Shift are set in Finglas
- Bono, lead singer of U2
- Achmet Borumborad, con-artist who operated in late 18th-century Dublin
- Charles Bowden, criminal
- Gerard Byrne (born 1958), artist
- Peter Byrne, sportswriter
- Declan Cassidy, filmmaker, television producer and author
- Patrick Clarke, filmmaker
- Christy Dignam, Joe Jewell, and Alan Downey, Aslan musicians
- Elayne Harrington, poet and visual artist
- Martin Doherty, volunteer for the Provisional Irish Republican Army
- Regina Doherty, Fine Gael MEP and former Minister for Social Protection
- Eamon Dunne, Irish crime boss
- Dessie Ellis, Sinn Féin TD
- Séamus Ennis, uilleann piper
- Mairead Farrell, radio and television personality
- Pat Fenlon, football manager
- Tony Fenton, DJ
- Patrick Finglas (died 1537), Lord Chief Justice of Ireland
- John Fogarty, superior general of the Congregation of the Holy Spirit
- Niamh Kavanagh, Eurovision Song Contest 1993 winner
- Paul J Kenny, neuroscientist
- Dick McKee, volunteer for the Irish Republican Army
- Glenn Meade, author and playwright
- Colm Meaney, actor
- Robert Winston, jockey
- Paula Meehan, poet and playwright
- Brendan O'Carroll, comedian and actor
- Stephen O'Rahilly, endocrinologist and scientist
- Paul Reid, public servant and former chief executive of Fingal County Council
- Spiral, a former Big Brother contestant, who wrote, performed and released a song about Finglas
- John William Stubbs, mathematician and clergyman

And in sport:

- Irish international footballers: Ronnie Whelan, Frank Stapleton, David O'Leary, Alan Moore, Mark Kinsella, Stephen Kelly, and footballers John Keogh, Cliff Byrne, Ricky McEvoy, Derek Geary, Shaun Maher, Stephen Geoghegan, Gavin Peers, Martin Russell, Shane Farrell, Kameron Ledwidge, Paddy Madden, James Talbot and Derek Brazil.
- All Ireland winning Dublin GAA players: James McCarthy, Charlie Redmond, Barney Rock and Jason Sherlock

== In popular culture ==
The BBC sitcom, Mrs. Brown's Boys, is set in Finglas.

== See also ==
- List of towns and villages in Ireland
- List of abbeys and priories in Ireland (County Dublin)

== Sources ==
- Tutty, Michael J. (1 March 1973). "Finglas". Dublin Historical Record. 26 (2). Dublin: Old Dublin Society: 66–73. JSTOR 30082560.
