= Martin Doherty (disambiguation) =

Martin Doherty (born 1982) is a musician with the band Chvrches.

Martin Doherty may also refer to:

- Martin Doherty (Irish republican) (1958–1994), volunteer in the Provisional Irish Republican Army
- Martin Doherty (historian), British historian

== See also ==
- Martin Docherty-Hughes (born 1971), Scottish politician
