= Dignam =

Dignam is a surname. Notable people with the surname include:

- Basil Dignam (1905–1979), English character actor
- Mark Dignam (1909–1989), English actor, brother of Basil
- Arthur Dignam (1939-2020), Australian actor
- Christy Dignam (1960-2023), lead singer of the Irish rock band Aslan

Dignam, fictional character in the book, Ulysses, by James Joyce. The plot revolves in large part about traveling to his funeral.

== Fictional people ==
- Sean Dignam, character in the 2006 American crime thriller film The Departed
