= Glyn Wise =

British television personality and minister

- Born: 9 January 1988 (age 38); Blaenau Ffestiniog, Wales
- Occupations: Reality TV star, politician, radio presenter, minister, deacon
- Television: Big Brother UK

Glyn Wise (born 9 January 1988) is a Welsh reality television star, politician, radio presenter and Church in Wales Minister, from Blaenau Ffestiniog, Wales. He is best known for appearing on the seventh series of Big Brother UK in 2006.

== Early life ==
Wise was born in Blaenau Ffestiniog to an English father and Welsh mother. His first language is Welsh. He attended Ysgol Dyffryn Conwy in Llanrwst, where he was head boy. He missed his A-level exams due to appearing on Big Brother. Prior to entering the Big Brother house, he worked as a lifeguard and had hoped to study Welsh at Bangor University.

In 2003, aged 15, he began presenting on BBC Radio Cymru show, Radio Blaenau. He later returned to radio and became a regular presenter on BBC Radio Cymru from 2006, until 2012.

== Television career ==
In 2006, Wise was a housemate on the seventh series of British reality television series Big Brother UK. This series of Big Brother was the third most watched in history with an average of 4.7 million viewers. Wise entered Day 1 and was the runner-up of the show, losing to Pete Bennett.

During his time on the show he was involved in a controversy, after he was reprimanded for communicating in his first language, Welsh, with fellow housemate Imogen Thomas. Big Brother deemed this as a form of "code" issuing Wise with a formal warning, who retorted with; "but Welsh is a British language?". Following the incident the Welsh Language Society complained to Channel 4, Ofcom and S4C. After this, Wise and Thomas continued to converse in Welsh and such discussions were broadcast with English-language subtitles.

In 2010, he appeared on Ultimate Big Brother, in the "Bubble Hold Me" task. Between 2012 and 2014, he also made regular appearances on Big Brother's Bit on the Side.

After appearing on Big Brother, Wise appeared on multiple television shows including; The Charlotte Church Show, Ready Steady Cook and Richard & Judy. He also appeared on numerous Welsh television shows including; Wedi 7 and Uned 5 he was also a guest presenter on S4C's children's show Planed Plant.

In 2025, it was announced that Wise was a contestant in the second series of Netflix's reality series; Squid Game: The Challenge.

== Political career ==
As a long-time supporter of the Welsh Nationalist party Plaid Cymru, in July 2015, Wise was announced as their candidate in Cardiff Central for the 2016 National Assembly for Wales election. He told the Press Association; "I can relate to the young people and the issues affecting them very well. Young people deserve more of a voice in politics. Plus, I've always been passionate about my country and wanted the best for Wales - as does Plaid Cymru." Wise finished in fourth place in the Cardiff Central in May 2016.

Three months later, he quit Plaid Cymru due to the party's support for the European Union. Wise tweeted the following statement; "Decided to leave Plaid Cymru today as we don't share the same vision / direction for our country any more". He pledged his support for the Brexit Party (now Reform UK) at the 2019 European Parliament election.

== Church in Wales ==
In 2022, Wise announced that he was training to become an ordained minister in the Church of Wales. He has been a Christian since attending Sunday School as a child. He claimed that moving to China had a big impact on his decision, claiming he wanted to bring the good word back to Wales, that he'd heard while visiting South Korea. He was officially ordained in 2022.

He ran the 2022 London Marathon to raise money for the Salvation Army, he did it again in 2024 in aid of two North Wales churches.

== Personal life ==
In 2007, he released his book titled Blwyddyn Fawr Glyn Wise (Glyn Wise's Big Year).

In 2012, he began working as a Welsh language teacher at Ysgol Gyfun Rhydywaun secondary school in Penywaun. After teaching there for two years, he became a tutor at Cardiff University, where he worked until 2016.

== Filmography ==
Television
Year	Title	Role	Notes
2006	Big Brother UK series 7	Self; housemate	2nd place; 107 episodes
2006	Big Brother Uncut	Self; housemate	25 episodes
2006	Big Brother's Little Brother	Self; ex-housemate	1 episode
2006	Richard & Judy	Self; guest	1 episode
2006	Uned 5	Self; guest	1 episode
2006	Wedi 7	Self; guest	1 episode
2006	Planed Plant	Self; guest presenter	1 episode
2006	The Charlotte Church Show	Self; guest	1 episode
2006	Ready Steady Cook	Self; guest	1 episode
2009	Michael McIntyre's Comedy Roadshow	Self; audience member	1 episode
2010	Ultimate Big Brother	Self; ex-housemate	3 episodes
2011	The Silent Library	Self; contestant	1 episode
2012–2014	Big Brother's Bit on the Side	Self; ex-housemate	4 episodes
2013	Zombies From Ireland	Glyn	
2022	This Morning	Self; guest	1 episode
2024	Rob Beckett's Smart TV	Self; guest	1 episode
2025	Squid Game: The Challenge series 2	Self; Player 036	
