= Unidare RFC =

Irish rugby union club

(Ireland) Unidare RFC
- Full name: Unidare Rugby Football Club
- Nickname: Ravens
- Founded: 1958
- Location: Dublin, Republic of Ireland
- Ground(s): Ballycuris Park, Ballymun, Dublin, Ireland
- Coach: Colm Finnegan
- Captain: Kevin Ryan
- League: Dublin Metropolitan J4 League
- 2010-11: 5th
Team kit

Official website
- www.unidarerfc.com

Unidare Rugby Football Club, commonly known as Unidare RFC, is a Rugby union club founded in 1958. The club currently plays at Balcurris park, Ballymun in Dublin city, Ireland. The club's emblem is a Raven and they play in Black and Red. The club plays in the Junior (J4) section of the Leinster Branch Metropolitan League.

== History ==
=== Foundation ===
Unidare Rugby Football Club was founded in 1958 by workers of the Unidare Works in Finglas, which is now defunct. During the foundation years (1958–1977) the club participated in the Business Houses Cup Competition and took part in friendly matches during the rest of the season. The club did not have their own grounds, but were given the use of a playing field and dressing rooms in Blackrock College by Father Shields.

=== Business Houses League ===
In 1977 the Business Houses League was formed. At that time Unidare Rugby Football Club was given grounds in Unidare Industrial estate on Jamestown Road, Finglas. The grounds were developed further by the club with dressing rooms, training lights, etc. The club did well in the Business Houses League, winning it for the first time in the 1980-1981 season. AIB had won the competition for the first three seasons of the competition. The club continued to participate in this competition during the 1980s.

=== Recent developments ===
In 1990 the club lost its playing fields when Unidare plc sold the land for development, and the club was hosted by Suttonians RFC and Malahide RFC for different seasons. In 2005, the club formed an alliance with Dublin City University Sports to play and train in the Ballymun grounds. As of 2011, Unidare played 21 seasons without a permanent home. Unidare in conjunction with The Dublin City Council were allocated the use of Balcurris Park as their new home ground.

=== Youth Section ===
In recent years, the club has undergone a revival in interest and membership and has focused in particular on the development of its youth teams. In the 2007/08 season, the club's first competitive under-age side created history by coming runners-up in the Dublin Metro U-18 League, at their very first attempt. The club currently fields youth sides at U-14, U-16, & U-18 and has ten fully qualified coaches currently working in their underage section.

== 2007/2008 Season ==
=== 2007/2008 J4 Metropolitan League Fixtures/Results ===
Date	Home team	Score	Away team	Venue	Match Report
13 October 2007	De La Salle Palmerston RFC	20 - 24	Unidare RFC	Kilternan	
20 October 2007	Unidare RFC	94 - 05	Malahide RFC	DCU Sportsground	
3 November 2007	AIB RFC	17 - 00	Unidare RFC	DCU Sportsground	...
10 November 2007	Dundalk RFC	11 - 10	Unidare RFC	Dundalk	...
17 November 2007	Clontarf RFC	8 - 00	Unidare RFC	Clontarf	...
1 December 2007	Unidare RFC	53 - 00	Emerald Warriors	DCU Sportsground	...
8 December 2007	CYM	05 - 10	Unidare RFC	Terenure	
5 January 2008	Unidare RFC	05 - 29	De La Salle Palmerston RFC	DCU Sportsground	...
12 January 2008	Malahide RFC	13 - 18	Unidare RFC	Estuary Road	...
27 January 2008	Unidare RFC	07 - 20	Dundalk	DCU Sportsground	...
16 February 2008	Unidare RFC	07 - 49	Clontarf	DCU Sportsground	...

=== 2007/2008 Friendly Fixtures/Results ===
Date	Home team	Score	Away team	Venue
15 September 2007	Stillorgan RFC	36 - 14	Unidare RFC	Bird Avenue
24 November 2007	Unidare RFC	00 - 29	Stillorgan RFC	DCU Sportsground

== 2011/2012 Season ==
=== 2011/2012 J4 Metropolitan League Fixtures/Results ===
Date	Home team	Score	Away team
1 October 2011	Tallaght	13 - 23	Unidare RFC
8 October 2011	St. Mary's College B	22 - 21	Unidare RFC
15 October 2011	Normans	00 - 32	Unidare RFC
22 October 2011	Malahide	32 - 13	Unidare RFC
5 November 2011	Milmount House	P - P	Unidare RFC
26 November 2011	Railway Union	23 - 03	Unidare RFC
3 December 2011	Parkmore	32 - 13	Unidare RFC
10 December 2011	Unidare RFC	08 - 03	Tallaght
7 January 2012	Unidare RFC	07 - 13	St. Mary's College B
14 January 2012	Unidare RFC	46 - 0	Normans
28 January 2012	Malahide	59 - 10	Unidare RFC
4 February 2012	Unidare RFC	P - P	Millmount House
11 February 2012	Unidare RFC	P - P	Millmount House
18 February 2012	Railway Union	58 - 10	Unidare RFC
3 March 2012	Unidare RFC	A - A	Parkmore

== See also ==
- Leinster Branch
