= Imogen Thomas =

Welsh model and television personality

- Born: Imogen Mary Thomas; Llanelli, Wales, UK
- Occupations: Model; television personality
- Years active: 2003–present
- Known for: Miss Wales, Big Brother
- Television: Big Brother
- Partner: Adam Horsley (2011–2018)
- Children: 2

Imogen Mary Thomas is a British model and reality television star from Llanelli, Wales. She is best known as the winner of Miss Wales 2003, representing her country at Miss World 2003 and for her time as a housemate on the seventh series of the [then] Channel 4 reality television programme Big Brother UK in 2006.

== Modelling career ==
Thomas was born in Llanelli. She began working as a model at the age of 13, moving to London at the age of 17 to become a professional model, she was rejected by most modelling agencies due to her height (5 ft. 6").

In 2003 Thomas entered Pageant Modelling and was crowned Miss Wales, defeating future Big Brother UK series 9 winner Rachel Rice who placed third. She represented Wales at Miss World China. She returned to London to venture in to glamour modelling. In January, 2007 she was on the cover of Maxim magazine.

== Television career ==
In 2006 Thomas was a housemate on the seventh series of the then Channel 4 reality television series Big Brother UK. This series of Big Brother was the third most watched in the history of the British version with an average of 4.7 million viewers. Thomas entered day 1 and was evicted on day 86 with 62% of the public vote, placing seventh overall.

During her time on the show she was involved in a controversy after fellow contestant Glyn Wise was reprimanded for communicating in his first language, Welsh, with Thomas. Big Brother deemed this as a form of "code" issuing Wise with a formal warning, who retorted with; "but Welsh is a British language?". Following the incident the Welsh Language Society complained to Channel 4, Ofcom and S4C. After this, Wise and Thomas continued to converse in Welsh and such discussions were broadcast with English-Language subtitles.

Thomas has made several other television appearances since Big Brother including; Big Brother's Little Brother, Big Brother's Big Mouth, Richard & Judy, Planed Plant, Pobol y Cwm, Dead Set and Celebrity Ex in the City.

== Personal life ==
In 2011, her alleged extramarital affair with former Manchester United and Wales international footballer, Ryan Giggs was the subject of a gagging order in England and Wales, receiving heavy press coverage.

She has two children with her ex-boyfriend Adam Horsley. Their first daughter, Ariana Siena Horsley, was born February 2013, their second daughter was born in 2015.

== Filmography ==
Film and television
Year	Title	Role	Notes
2003	Miss World 2003 Pageant	Self; Miss Wales	TV special
2003	RI:SE	Self; Miss Wales	1 episode
2006	Big Brother UK series 7	Self; housemate	7th place, 101 episodes
2006	Big Brother: Uncut	Self; housemate	24 episodes
2006	Big Brother's Little Brother	Self; ex-housemate	1 episode
2006	Big Brother's Big Mouth	Self; ex-housemate	1 episode
2006	Richard & Judy	Self; guest	1 episode
2006	Uned 5	Self; guest	1 episode
2006	Planed Plant	Self; ghost hunter	1 episode
2006	Pobol y Cwm	Self; cameo	1 episode
2008	Russell & Ross: What The F*** Was All That About?	Self; cameo	TV film
2008	Dead Set	Imogen Thomas	4 episodes
2009	Celebrity Shock List 2009	Self; commentator	Documentary
2010	Ultimate Big Brother	Self; ex-housemate	1 episode
2010	Celebrity Coach Trip	Self; contestant	6 episodes
2011	Comic Relief: Red Nose Day 2011	Self	TV special
2011	Britain's Got More Talent	Self; co-host	2 episodes
2011	That Sunday Night Show	Self; guest	1 episode
2011	Beer & Pizza Club	Self; guest	1 episode
2011	Most Shocking Celebrity Moments of 2011	Self; commentator	Documentary
2012	Celebrity Come Dine with Me	Self; contestant	1 episode
2012	Loserville	Mother	
2012-2013	Big Brothers: Bit on the Side	Self; panelist	3 episodes
2018	Celebrity Dinner Date	Self; contestant	1 episode
2021	Celebrity Ex in the City series 2	Self; cast member	8 episodes
2022	Nikki Grahame: Who is She?	Self	Documentary
2022	Hot Property	Self; contestant	1 episode

== See also ==
- 2011 British privacy injunctions controversy
