= Wobble Jaggle Jiggle =

- Origin: Brighton, England
- Genres: Neo-psychedelia, space rock, progressive rock
- Years active: 1989-2000
- Labels: Wobble Jaggle Jiggle, Delerium Records, Magic Gnome, September Gurls

Wobble Jaggle Jiggle were an English psychedelic rock band active in Brighton, England, during the 1990s.

== History ==
The group were formed in 1989 by Robert 'Wobbly Bob' Chambers (guitar, bass, vocals), Ivor Vasquez (drums) and Ben 'The Bass' Jackson (bass, vocals), with Caroline Davey (vocals, keyboards, harmonica) joining in 1991. They recorded and produced a series of home-made cassette albums which they sold locally, and made their first vinyl appearance when they contributed the professionally recorded song "Thoughts of the Sky" to the 1992 Delerium Records compilation "Fun With Mushrooms". Jackson then left, from which point Chambers played bass in their recordings while other bassists played live with the band, including Niall Hone (from Mandragora, 1993) and Dan Chapman (1994-95). Their third cassette, "Overflowing Bowl Of Green Jelly", received a limited vinyl reissue on the Magic Gnome label in 1994, and the 1999 September Gurls label LP/CD "It Came From Nowhere" brought together archive tracks from a number of different line-ups. Vasquez left the band in 1996, replaced by 'Trippy Fish', and Davey left in 1997 before Chambers ended the group around 2000.

The style and image of Wobble Jaggle Jiggle was based heavily on 1960s psychedelia and heavy drug references. The band's name was taken from Chambers' description of a drug experience, and many of his lyrics alluded to counter-culture lifestyle of "getting stoned and wearing groovy clothes". Chambers was also a prolific artist and created all of the band's album artwork and additional comic strip bonus material. Caroline Davey's vocals were frequently compared to Grace Slick. Chambers' guitar playing was influenced by the likes of Jimi Hendrix and Syd Barrett, and the band were part of the late-1980s/early 1990s British acid rock revival alongside bands like Spacemen 3, Sun Dial and The Bevis Frond. The rarity of their deliberately lo-fi cassette tape releases meant that it was only with the advent of the internet that their albums reached a wider audience and developed a cult following after the group had already split.

Caroline Davey also sang with the bands Cherokee Mist and Mandragora and continues to perform as a solo artist.

In September 2003 Wobbly Bob (guitar, vocals) formed the group 'Daddy Fantastic', named after a Wobble Jaggle Jiggle song which was in turn named after one of his cartoon character creations. He was joined by 'The Baron' (bass, vocals) and 'Nimbus' (drums, also of Crawlspace). In August 2004 they added Pete 'The Daddy' Bennett (vocals) and developed a live show involving performance artists. In 2006 Bennett left the band to launch a solo career. The original members continued to perform until Rob Chambers died in December 2008, aged 41.

== Discography ==
- 1991 Fresh Today - cassette (Music & Elsewhere)
- 1991 Kingdom of the Big White Rabbit - cassette (Wobble Jaggle Jiggle)
- 1992 Overflowing Bowl Of Green Jelly - cassette (Wobble Jaggle Jiggle) / 1994 reissue - LP (Magic Gnome)
- 1993 Rockadelic Reefer - cassette (Wobble Jaggle Jiggle)
- 1993 Sock It To Me - cassette (Wobble Jaggle Jiggle)
- 1994 Spiralize Surprize - cassette (Wobble Jaggle Jiggle)
- 1996 Strange Tales From The Electric Beyond - double cassette (Wobble Jaggle Jiggle)
- 1999 It Came From Nowhere - LP/CD (September Gurls)
