= Finglas (song) =

Single by Spiral
- Released: 2006
- Recorded: 2006
- Genre: Rap
- Label: Inspire L Productions
- Songwriter: Glen "Spiral" Coroner

"Finglas" is a rap song by Irish Big Brother UK series 7 contestant Glen "Spiral" Coroner. It was written and released by Spiral before his appearance on the reality television show.

The video was first seen on British television on Big Brother's Little Brother. The song is about Spiral's hometown of Finglas.

The song re-entered the Irish Singles Chart on 10 August 2006 at #9, after his profile had risen due to leaving the Big Brother House, the song had initially peaked at #38 on 16 March 2006 .
