= Dignam & Goff =

Dignam & Goff was the project of Christy Dignam, the lead singer of the band Aslan, and the guitarist Conor Goff in the early 1990s before Aslan reunited in 1993.

Goff was the guitarist of Fast Boys and his project called Conor Goff and The Crash had a top 20 hit in Ireland in 1987 with "America". Dignam & Goff made a number of recordings including "Hand Of Love", "Martin", "Rain", "Feel It In My Heart", "Sacrianna Falls" and "Walk On Water".

No official Dignam and Goff CD was released due to Aslan overshadowing popularity over the duo's short-lived career. However, a CD titled Christy Dignam: The Singles 1984-1991 was released on Solid Records in 1991. This is still available in Irish record stores and contains many Dignam & Goff singles as well as Aslan's earlier singles. Their unreleased album is known as Dead Blue Fish.

Dignam went on front Aslan again. Goff is believed to be involved in the building industry in the Monkstown.
