= Aslan (band) =

Irish rock band

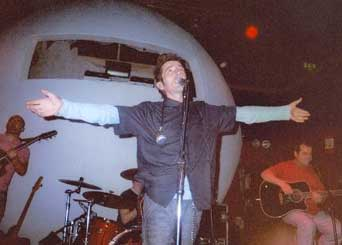

Background information
- Origin: Finglas, Dublin, Ireland
- Genres: Rock, celtic rock
- Years active: 1982–1988, 1993–present
- Labels: EMI, BMG, Rubyworks Records, Dolphin Records
- Members: Joe Jewell; Billy McGuinness; Alan Downey; Lee Tomkins
- Past members: Christy Dignam; Eamo Doyle; Tony McGuinness; Rodney O'Brien
- Website: aslan-news.co.uk

Aslan are an Irish rock band from Dublin who formed in 1982. Composed originally of Christy Dignam, Joe Jewell, Tony McGuinness, Billy McGuinness, and Alan Downey, the band has released six studio albums: Feel No Shame (1988), Goodbye Charlie Moonhead (1994), Here Comes Lucy Jones (1997), Waiting For This Madness To End (2001), For Some Strange Reason (2007) and Nudie Books and Frenchies (2012).

== History ==
Aslan took their name from the fictional lion in C.S. Lewis's series of books chronicling the land of Narnia (Aslan is the Turkish word for "Lion"). The band came from the working class areas of Finglas and Ballymun in Dublin's Northside, in the mid-1980s. They released a demo single, "This Is", in the spring of 1986. It was a success and a popular single on Ireland's pop radio station, RTÉ 2fm.

In the summer of 1986, they played a series of shows in the UK and Melody Maker noted: "Lucky the label that signs this band!" Janice Long at BBC Radio 1 recorded Aslan in session and it aired three times in the subsequent weeks. At the end of 1986, Aslan were awarded The Stag/Hot Press "Most Promising New Band" award and signed to EMI.

=== Feel No Shame and breakup (1988) ===
In 1988, Aslan recorded their debut album, Feel No Shame, which went to number one on the Irish Albums Chart. Within a couple of months it was certified Gold, and the band embarked on a promotional U.S. tour. However, in August 1988 after the option for their second album had been picked up, and just before Feel No Shame was due to be released Stateside, Dignam's spiralling heroin addiction led to him being fired from the band. The remaining members recruited singer Eamo Doyle, who previously played with Dublin band The Lookalikes, but according to drummer Alan Downey in the Made In Dublin DVD: "it was like U2 trying to go on without Bono... it was just never going to work". Eamo Doyle then played with Les Binks from Judas Priest. Christy Dignam went on to form Dignam & Goff with guitarist Conor Goff, whilst the other members went on to form The Precious Stones.

=== Reunion ===
On 11 July 1993, Aslan played what was planned as a one-time charity performance in Finglas. Rather, they decided to reunite proper and then landed a new record deal with BMG. The first single "Crazy World" entered the Irish Singles Chart at number four and stayed in the chart for three months. "Crazy World" also won the "Single of the Year" at 1993's Hot Press Awards. A few months later the follow-up single, "Where's The Sun", reached number three on the chart.

The latter part of 1994 was spent touring in Ireland and recording their album Goodbye Charlie Moonhead, which was released in Ireland at the end of 1994 and charted at number one, going on to be certified Gold weeks later. But by 1995, the band were dropped by their record label BMG. In April 1996, Aslan began recording a new album without a record label. This album, Here Comes Lucy Jones was released in October 1997 and the album went into the Irish Albums Chart at number fourteen. Aslan were nominated in seven categories of the 1997 Hot Press readers poll.

Shame About Lucy Moonhead, a compilation of the best of Aslan's recorded work on EMI, was released in July 1998. It reached number one in the Irish albums chart and was later certified double platinum. In March 1999, Aslan played five sell-out shows at Ireland's Vicar Street venue, during which their live album and video concert movie/DVD Made In Dublin were recorded. Both reached number one in their first week of release. The album went platinum within three weeks and remained in the top ten for eight weeks. Towards the end of 1999 Aslan sold out Ireland's largest indoor venue (9,000 capacity), the Point Theatre on 26 December, sharing the billing with Picture House.

In the summer of 2000, Aslan toured Australia for the first time to promote the release of the album Shame About Lucy Moonhead and sold-out shows in Sydney and Melbourne. Aslan ended 2000 by playing for the first time in the Netherlands to a sellout crowd. Afterwards, they returned to Ireland to sell out the Point Theatre on 27 December.

In early 2001, Aslan recorded a single, "She's So Beautiful" (featuring Sinéad O'Connor on backing vocals), which entered the Irish Singles Chart at number nine on the week ending 26 July 2001 and peaked at number eight the following week. The band released the follow-up "Different Man", which charted at number seven. In September 2001, Aslan's studio album, Waiting for This Madness to End entered the Irish Album Chart at number one, and reached platinum sales certification after only four weeks. During Christmas 2001, Aslan again sold out the 9,000 capacity Point Theatre. In 2002 Aslan were nominated for eight categories in the Hot Press readers' poll.

In October 2005, the band released a 48-track CD, named Platinum. The album contains the singles, b-sides and rarities of their career. The Platinum collection went into the charts at number three and after several weeks achieved platinum sales. The band played yet another headlining gig at the Point Theatre on 27 December 2005.

The band helped write and perform "How Can I Protect You", the tenth track for Alabama 3 on their 2006 album, Outlaw. Their next album, For Some Strange Reason, was released in October 2007 and debuted at number eight in the Irish Albums Chart. This was their first album based solely on new material not to debut in top spot since 1997's Here Comes Lucy Jones. Two singles, "Here Comes the Sun" and "Jealous Little Thing" were released prior to the album. Singer Damien Dempsey makes an appearance on the new album on the track "Bullets and Diamonds".

On 15 February 2008, Aslan won the award for Best Irish Band at the 2008 Meteor Awards. Soon afterwards, Tony McGuinness announced on the band's website that he would be moving to Australia for one year with his family, and would be replaced by Rodney O'Brien as bass player for Aslan during that time. On 7 November 2008, Aslan performed "Always" on a balcony overlooking Dame Street, in Dublin for the music viral show BalconyTV. In May 2009, Aslan released "Uncased" and reached number two in the Irish Singles Chart. The band toured Australia in December 2011 playing to large crowds of predominantly expatriates. Their album Nudie Books and Frenchies was released in April 2012 and reached number one in the Irish Albums Chart.

Aslan released their next single "Secret Smile" on 10 July 2015. They also released their single "Now I Know" in 2018, with a 30th anniversary version of Feel No Shame on vinyl and CD. In early 2019, they released a 25th anniversary edition of Goodbye Charlie Moonhead on vinyl, excluding the track "Maybe I'm Obsessed".

=== Death of Christy Dignam ===
Christy Dignam died at his home on 13 June 2023 at the age of 63, from complications associated with amyloidosis and myeloma.

In February 2024, Aslan announced new singer Lee Tomkins as they prepared to embark on an Irish tour.

== Band members ==
Current

- Joe Jewell – lead guitar, backing vocals (1982–1988, 1993–present)
- Billy McGuinness – keyboards, harmonica, guitar (1982–1988, 1993–present)
- Alan Downey – drums, percussion (1982–1988, 1993–present)
- Lee Tomkins - lead vocals (2024-present)

Former

- Christy Dignam – lead vocals (1982–1987, 1993–2023; died 2023)
- Tony McGuinness – bass guitar (1982–2008)
- Rodney O'Brien (2009–2022) -bass
- Andreas Amthor (1997-2007) - guitar vocals
- Eamonn 'Eamo' Doyle – lead vocals (1988–1989)

== Discography ==
=== Studio albums ===
Year	Album details	Peak chart positions	Certifications (sales thresholds)
Year	Album details	IRE	Certifications (sales thresholds)
1988	Feel No Shame: Released: 1988; Label: EMI Ireland; Formats: CD, LP, Cassette	1	IRE: Gold
1994	Goodbye Charlie Moonhead: Released: 1 October 1994; Label: BMG; Formats: CD, Cassette, LP	1	IRE: Gold
1997	Here Comes Lucy Jones: Released: October 1997; Label: Solid (RO #19); Formats: CD, Cassette, LP	14	IRE: Gold
2001	Waiting For This Madness To End...: Released: September 2001; Label: EMI (SLAM #01); Formats: CD, Cassette, LP	1	IRE: Platinum x2
2007	For Some Strange Reason: Released: 5 October 2007; Label: EMI Ireland (SLAM #07); Formats: CD, Cassette, LP	7	IRE: Gold
2009	UNCASE'd: Released: 22 May 2009; Label: EMI Ireland (SLAM #09); Formats: CD, Cassette, LP	2	
2012	Nudie Books and Frenchies: Released: 20 April 2012; Label: EMI Ireland; Formats: CD, Cassette, LP	1	
2018	Feel No Shame 30th Anniversary: Released 7 September 2018; Label: Beaumex; Format: CD	N/A	

=== Live albums ===
Year	Album details	Peak chart positions	Certifications (sales thresholds)
Year	Album details	IRE	Certifications (sales thresholds)
1999	Made in Dublin – Live at Vicar Street: Released: 1999; Label: EMI Ireland; Formats: CD, LP	1	IRE: Platinum x3

=== Compilation albums ===
Year	Album details	Peak chart positions	Certifications (sales thresholds)
Year	Album details	IRE	Certifications (sales thresholds)
1998	Shame About Lucy Moonhead – The Best of Aslan: Released: July 1998; Label: EMI Ireland; Formats: CD, LP, Cassette	1	IRE: Platinum x2
2005	The Platinum Collection: Released: October 2005; Label: EMI Ireland (SLAM #05); Formats: CD, Cassette, LP	3	IRE: Platinum x3

=== Singles ===
Year	Single	Peak chart positions	Album
Year	Single	IRE	Album
1986	"This Is"	2	Feel No Shame
1986	"Loving Me Lately"		Feel No Shame
1987	"Pretty Thing"	14	Feel No Shame
1987	"Please Don't Stop"	7	Feel No Shame
1988	"Loving Me Lately (Re-Issue)"	20	Feel No Shame
1988	"This Is (Re-Issue)"		Feel No Shame
1989	"Don't Make Me Cry... Again"	18	non album single
1989	"Strangelove"		non album single
1993	"Crazy World"	4	Goodbye Charlie Moonhead
1994	"Where's the Sun?"	3	Goodbye Charlie Moonhead
1995	"Rainman"		Goodbye Charlie Moonhead
1997	"Lucy Jones Part 2"	17	Here Comes Lucy Jones
1997	"Hurt Sometimes"	35	Here Comes Lucy Jones
1998	"Lucy Jones Part 1"		Here Comes Lucy Jones
1998	"This Is '98"	7	Shame About Lucy Moonhead
1998	"Crazy World '98"	22	Shame About Lucy Moonhead
2001	"She's So Beautiful"	8	Waiting For This Madness To End...
2001	"Different Man"	9	Waiting For This Madness To End...
2001	"Love Is All You Need"		Waiting For This Madness To End...
2002	"Six Days To Zero"	19	Waiting For This Madness To End...
2004	"Shine A Light"	4	The Platinum Collection
2004	"Crazy World (Re-Issue)"	3	The Platinum Collection
2005	"Fall On Me"	9	The Platinum Collection
2007	"Here Comes The Sun"	5	For Some Strange Reason
2007	"Jealous Little Thing"	22	For Some Strange Reason
2009	"Jealous Guy"		UNCASE'd
2012	"Too Late For Hallelujah"	24	Nudie Books and Frenchies
2014	"I Need a Little Time"	22	
2015	"Secret Smile"	--	
2023	"Fields of Athenry"	--	
2025	"Hear Your Call"	--	
2025	"A Hand to Hold"	--	

=== DVD ===
- Made In Dublin – Unplugged and Documented (1999)
- "Please Don't Stop" (2013)

== Bibliography ==
- Damien Corless: Aslan's Crazy World, Verge-Brunswick Press, 1998. ISBN 978-0-9532285-0-8
