= Joe Jewell =

Irish rock musician

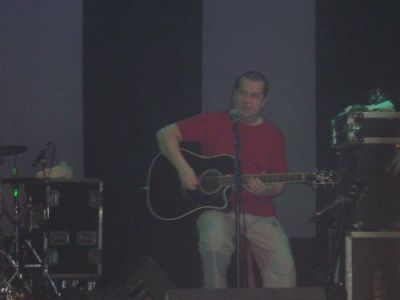
- Joe Jewell performing at a festival in Belfast with Aslan

Background information
- Born: 25 December 1958 (age 66); Dublin, Ireland
- Genres: Rock
- Occupation: Musician
- Instrument(s): Guitar, Vocals
- Years active: 1982–present

Joe Jewell (born 25 December 1958, Dublin) is an Irish singer and lead guitarist of the rock band Aslan. His career of over twenty-five years has been characterized by numerous successes on the Irish charts. He co-wrote many of the band's songs including "Crazy World", "This Is", "Where's The Sun?", and "Hurt Sometimes". He also wrote the memorable riffs behind the songs and is the falsetto backing vocalist behind Christy Dignam in the band.
