= Peter Byrne (sportswriter) =

Irish sportswriter and author (1935–2022)

- Born: 4 October 1935; Finglas, Dublin, Ireland
- Died: 10 August 2022 (aged 86); Blanchardstown, Dublin, Ireland
- Burial place: St. Fintan's Cemetery, Sutton
- Occupation: Sportswriter
- Spouse: Tina Byrne
- Children: 3

Peter Byrne (4 October 1935 – 10 August 2022) was an Irish sportswriter. Known as "the Doyen", he covered soccer, boxing and athletics during a 38-year career with the Irish Times.

== Early life ==
Born in Dublin on 4 October 1935, Byrne was brought up in the northside suburb of Finglas. His father Billy worked in the transport sector with CIÉ. Byrne spent three years as a scholarship student at St Macartan's College in Monaghan, but later transferred to O'Connell School in Dublin after taking his Intermediate Certificate exam.

== Career ==
Byrne's career in sports journalism began when he was still a secondary school student. He would attend boxing matches at the National Stadium, write his reports at home and drop off the article at the offices of the Evening Mail before going on to school. Byrne also wrote for the Sunday Review. He supplemented his freelance journalism earnings by taking a day job as a clerk with British Rail, where one of his colleagues was Jimmy Magee.

After the closure of both the Evening Mail and the Sunday Review, Byrne joined the staff of the Irish Times in 1963. Over the course of the following 38 years he covered soccer, boxing and athletics, including six FIFA World Cups and eight Olympic Games. Byrne also contributed many pieces to Britain's the Daily Telegraph and the News of the World as their Irish sports stringer. He was the recipient of the Sportswriter of the Year award on five occasions between 1973 and 1981.

Byrne collaborated on three books with Jack Charlton, including his 1996 autobiography. He also wrote a history of the Football Association of Ireland to celebrate their 75th anniversary. Byrne retired from the Irish Times in 2001.

== Death ==
Byrne died at Connolly Hospital in Blanchardstown on 10 August 2022, at the age of 86.

== Works ==
- Byrne, Peter (3 December 2013). From The Press Box: 70 Years of Great Moments in Irish Sport. Dublin: Liberties Press. ISBN 978-1909718159.
