= Crazy World (Aslan song) =

Single by Aslan

from the album Goodbye Charlie Moonhead
- A-side: "Crazy World"
- B-side: "Down On Me, Crazy World Live"
- Released: July 1993
- Recorded: Ropewalk Studios, Dublin.
- Genre: Rock
- Label: BMG Ireland
- Songwriter(s): Aslan
- Producer(s): Chris O’Brien and Aslan

Aslan singles chronology
"Strangelove" (1989)	"Crazy World" (1993)	"Where's the Sun?" (1994)

"Crazy World" is a single by Irish Dublin-based group Aslan, released in July 1993 by BMG Ireland. Taken from the album Goodbye Charlie Moonhead, the song reached number four on the Irish Singles Chart and stayed in the charts for three months, becoming one of the most played songs on Irish radio in 1993. It also won "Single of The Year" at 1993's Hot Press Awards.

== Charts ==
Chart (1993)	Peak position
Europe (Eurochart Hot 100)	89
Ireland (IRMA)	4
