= Paul J. Kenny =

Interim Director of the Friedman Brain Institute

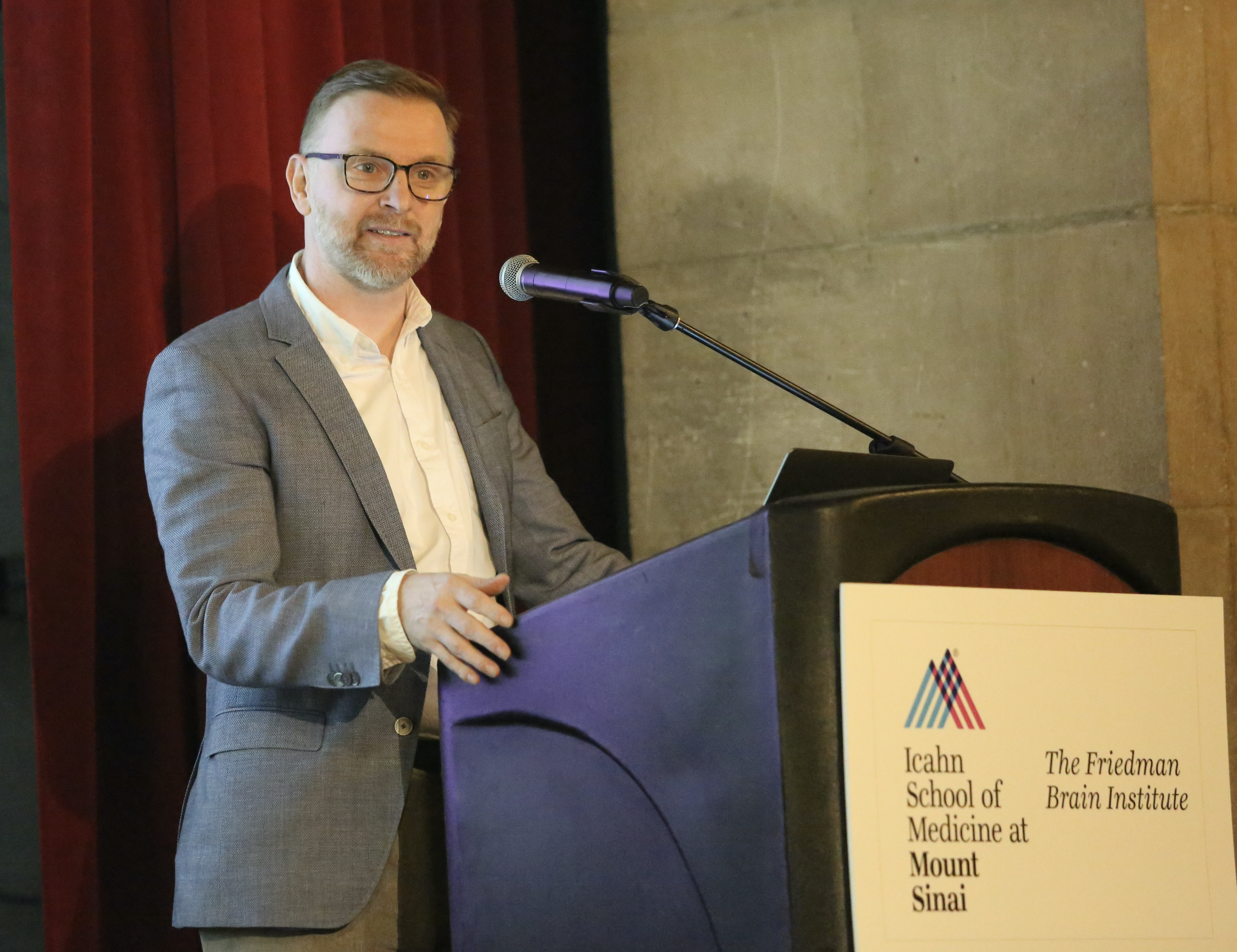
- Kenny in 2025
- Citizenship: Irish
- Education: King's College London
- Employer: Icahn School of Medicine at Mount Sinai
- Known for: neurobiology of obesity and drug addiction
- Website: https://labs.neuroscience.mssm.edu/project/kenny-lab/

Paul J. Kenny is the Nash Family Professor of Neuroscience and Director of the Friedman Brain Institute at the Icahn School of Medicine at Mount Sinai (ISMMS) in New York City. Kenny also serves as Director of the Drug Discovery Institute and the NIDA T32 Training Program in Substance Use Disorders at ISMMS.

Dr. Kenny's research focuses on the neurobiology of addiction, obesity, and psychiatric disorders. He has published over 150 peer-reviewed papers and has an h-index of 71 with over 20,000 citations.

== Biography ==
=== Education ===
Kenny earned a Bachelor of Arts in Biochemistry from Trinity College Dublin in 1996, followed by a Ph.D. in Neuropsychopharmacology from King’s College London in 2000. He subsequently moved to the United States for postdoctoral research in neuropharmacology at The Scripps Research Institute, La Jolla, California (2000–2005).

=== Career ===
After completing his postdoctoral fellowship, Kenny joined The Scripps Research Institute as a staff scientist (2005–2006), later rising to Assistant Professor (2006), Associate Professor (2008), and Associate Professor with tenure (2011) in the Department of Molecular Therapeutics. In 2014, Kenny joined the Icahn School of Medicine at Mount Sinai, serving as Professor and Chair of the Department of Pharmacology and Systems Therapeutics before becoming Chair of the Nash Family Department of Neuroscience in 2016. He currently holds the Nash Family Professorship of Neuroscience and directs both the Drug Discovery Institute and the NIDA-funded T32 Training Program in Substance Use Disorders. In 2025, Kenny was appointed Interim Director of the Friedman Brain Institute. Kenny is a Fellow of the American College of Neuropsychopharmacology and has served on multiple National Institutes of Health advisory councils, editorial boards, and scientific advisory committees. Kenny is also a co-founder of Eolas Therapeutics, Inc., a biotechnology company developing novel therapeutics for substance use disorders.

=== Research ===
Kenny's research examines the neurobiological mechanisms underlying substance use disorders, overeating and obesity, and psychiatric disorders, including the role of nicotinic acetylcholine receptors. The Kenny Laboratory at the Icahn School of Medicine at Mount Sinai was among the first to identify the role of glucagon-like peptide-1 (GLP-1) receptors in the neurobiology of substance use disorders.

=== Affiliations and Positions ===
Kenny has served in editorial and advisory capacities within the neuroscience and pharmacology communities. He is a member of the Editorial Boards of several scientific journals and is Deputy Editor of Biological Psychiatry.

At the national level, Kenny has served on National Institutes of Health (NIH) study sections and advisory councils, including the advisory councils of the National Institute on Drug Abuse (NIDA) and the National Institute on Alcohol Abuse and Alcoholism (NIAAA). He also served on the NIH Council of Councils (CoC), which provides strategic guidance and broad oversight across the entire agency. Kenny was also an invited scientific delegate to the Neuroscience Caucus of the US Congress.

In addition to his NIH service, Kenny has participated on scientific advisory boards for research foundations and biotechnology companies focused on addiction and neuropsychiatric therapeutics. He is also a Fellow of the American College of Neuropsychopharmacology (ACNP) and is a member of the ACNP Council.

=== Awards and Honors ===
Partial list:

- 2025 Jacobi Medallion, Mount Sinai Alumni Association and Icahn School of Medicine at Mount Sinai
- 2020 Alton Ochsner Award Relating Smoking and Disease, Ochsner Health
- 2018 Daniel H. Efron Research Award, American College of Neuropsychopharmacology
- 2018 MERIT Award, National Institute on Drug Abuse
- 2015 Tom Connor Distinguished Investigator Award, Neuroscience Ireland
- 2012 Mathilde Solowey Lecture Award in Neurosciences, NIH/FAES
- 2010 Jacob P. Waletzky Memorial Award, Society for Neuroscience
- 2010 Jarvik-Russell Award, Society for Research on Nicotine and Tobacco

== Books and publications ==
=== Books ===
- 2020 Pierce, R. Christopher; Unterwald, Ellen; Kenny, Paul J., eds. (2020). Addiction, Second Edition (Perspectives CSHL). Cold Spring Harbor Laboratory Press. ISBN 978-1-621823-50-6.
- 2020 Nestler, Eric J.; Kenny, Paul J.; Russo, Scott J.; Shaefer, Anne, eds. (2020). Molecular Neuropharmacology: A Foundation for Clinical Neuroscience, Fourth Edition. McGraw Hill. ISBN 9781260456912.

=== Publications ===
- Carty, JRE; Devarakonda, K; O'Connor, RM; Krek, A; Espinoza, D; Jimenez-Gonzalez, M; Alvarsson, A; Hampton, RF; Li, R; Qiu, Y; Petri, S; Shtekler, A; Rajbhandari, A; Conner, K; Bayne, M; Garibay, D; Martin, J; Lehmann, V; Wang, L; Beaumont, K; Kurland, I; Yuan, GC; Kenny, PJ; Stanley, SA (2025). "Amygdala-liver signalling orchestrates glycaemic responses to stress". Nature. 646 (8085): 697–706. Bibcode:2025Natur.646..697C. doi:10.1038/s41586-025-09420-1. PMC 12527908. PMID 40903586.
- Duncan, A; Heyer, MP; Ishikawa, M; Caligiuri, SPB; Liu, XA; Chen, Z; Micioni Di Bonaventura, MV; Elayouby, KS; Ables, JL; Howe, WM; Bali, P; Fillinger, C; Williams, M; O'Connor, RM; Wang, Z; Lu, Q; Kamenecka, TM; Ma'ayan, A; O'Neill, HC; Ibanez-Tallon, I; Geurts, AM; Kenny, PJ (2019). "Habenular TCF7L2 links nicotine addiction to diabetes". Nature. 574 (7778): 372–377. Bibcode:2019Natur.574..372D. doi:10.1038/s41586-019-1653-x. PMC 9851388. PMID 31619789.
- Faghihi, Mohammad Ali; Modarresi, Farzaneh; Khalil, Ahmad M; Wood, Douglas E; Sahagan, Barbara G; Morgan, Todd E; Finch, Caleb E; St Laurent III, Georges; Kenny, Paul J; Wahlestedt, Claes (2008). "Expression of a noncoding RNA is elevated in Alzheimer's disease and drives rapid feed-forward regulation of beta-secretase". Nat Med. 14 (7): 723–730. doi:10.1038/nm1784. PMC 2826895. PMID 18587408.
- Fowler, CD; Lu, Q; Johnson, PM; Marks, MJ; Kenny, PJ (2011). "Habenular α5 nicotinic receptor subunit signalling controls nicotine intake". Nature. 471 (7340): 597–601. Bibcode:2011Natur.471..597F. doi:10.1038/nature09797. PMC 3079537. PMID 21278726.
- Hollander, JA; Im, HI; Amelio, AL; Kocerha, J; Bali, P; Lu, Q; Willoughby, D; Wahlestedt, C; Conkright, MD; Kenny, PJ (2010). "Striatal microRNA controls cocaine intake through CREB signalling". Nature. 466 (7303): 197–202. Bibcode:2010Natur.466..197H. doi:10.1038/nature09202. PMC 2916751. PMID 20613834.
- Johnson, PM; Kenny, PJ (2010). "Dopamine D2 receptors in addiction-like reward dysfunction and compulsive eating in obese rats". Nature Neuroscience. 13 (5): 635–641. doi:10.1038/nn.2519. PMC 2947358. PMID 20348917.
- Kenny, Paul J; Voren, George; Johnson, Paul M (2013). "Dopamine D2 receptors and striatopallidal transmission in addiction and obesity". Curr Opin Neurobiol. 23 (4): 535–538. doi:10.1016/j.conb.2013.04.012. PMC 3799805. PMID 23726225.
- Kenny, Paul J (2011). "Reward mechanisms in obesity: new insights and future directions". Neuron. 69 (4): 664–679. doi:10.1016/j.neuron.2011.02.016. PMC 3057652. PMID 21338878.
- Lepack, AE; Werner, CT; Stewart, AF; Fulton, SL; Zhong, P; Farrelly, LA; Smith, ACW; Ramakrishnan, A; Lyu, Y; Bastle, RM; Martin, JA; Mitra, S; O'Connor, RM; Wang; Molina, H; Turecki, G; Shen, L; Yan, Z; Calipari, ES; Dietz, DM; Kenny, PJ; Maze, I (2020). "Dopaminylation of histone H3 in ventral tegmental area regulates cocaine seeking". Science. 368 (6487): 197–201. Bibcode:2020Sci...368..197L. doi:10.1126/science.aaw8806. PMC 7228137. PMID 32273471.
- Mathis, VP; Williams, M; Fillinger, C; Kenny, PJ (2021). "Networks of habenula-projecting cortical neurons regulate cocaine seeking". Science Advances. 7 (45) eabj2225. Bibcode:2021SciA....7.2225M. doi:10.1126/sciadv.abj2225. PMC 8570600. PMID 34739312.
- Smith, ACW; Ghoshal, S; Centanni, SW; Heyer, MP; Corona, A; Wills, L; Andraka, E; Lei, Y; O'Connor, RM; Caligiuri, SPB; Khan, S; Beaumont, K; Sebra, RP; Kieffer, BL; Winder, DG; Ishikawa, M; Kenny, PJ (2024). "A master regulator of opioid reward in the ventral prefrontal cortex". Science. 384 (6700) eadn0886. doi:10.1126/science.adn0886. PMC 11323237. PMID 38843332.
- Smith, ACW; Jonkman, S; Difeliceantonio, AG; O'Connor, RM; Ghoshal, S; Romano, MF; Everitt, BJ; Kenny, PJ (2021). "Opposing roles for striatonigral and striatopallidal neurons in dorsolateral striatum in consolidating new instrumental actions". Nature Communications. 12 (1) 5121. Bibcode:2021NatCo..12.5121S. doi:10.1038/s41467-021-25460-3. PMC 8387469. PMID 34433818.
- Tuesta, LM; Chen, Z; Duncan, A; Fowler, CD; Ishikawa, M; Lee, BR; Liu, XA; Lu, Q; Cameron, M; Hayes, MR; Kamenecka, TM; Pletcher, M; Kenny, PJ (2017). "GLP-1 acts on habenular avoidance circuits to control nicotine intake". Nature Neuroscience. 20 (5): 708–716. doi:10.1038/nn.4540. PMC 5541856. PMID 28368384.
