= Big Brother (British TV series) series 7 =

Seventh series of the British reality Big Brother

Coordinates: 51°39′23″N 0°16′02″W

Big Brother
- Series 7
- Series seven logo
- Presented by: Davina McCall
- No. of days: 93
- No. of housemates: 22
- Winner: Pete Bennett
- Runner-up: Glyn Wise
- Companion shows: Big Brother's Little Brother; Big Brother's Big Mouth; Big Brother's Big Brain; Big Brother Live; Diary Room Uncut
- No. of episodes: 107

Release
- Original network: Channel 4
- Original release: 18 May – 18 August 2006

Series chronology
- ← Previous; Series 6 Next → Series 8

Big Brother 2006, also known as Big Brother 7, is the seventh series of the British reality television series Big Brother. The show followed a total of twenty-two contestants, known as housemates, who were isolated from the outside world for an extended period of time in a custom built house. Each week, one or more of the housemates were eliminated from the competition and left the House. The last remaining housemate, Pete Bennett, was declared the winner, winning a cash prize of £100,000.

The series launched on Channel 4 on 18 May 2006 and ended on 18 August 2006, lasting 93 days - the joint-second longest British edition of Big Brother to date (together with the ninth and tenth series, and one day shorter than the eighth series). Davina McCall returned as presenter for her seventh consecutive year. Fourteen housemates entered on launch night, with an additional eight being introduced in later weeks. The series was watched by an average of 4.7 million viewers, the third highest viewed series of the show to date. It was also the first series since the show's inception to be broadcast in 16:9 aspect ratio, as opposed to 4:3.

Big Brother 7 was the subject of viewer complaints and press attention regarding a variety of controversial issues, including the wellbeing of certain participants and the decision to re-instate evicted housemates with a chance to win. In 2010, the series was voted the British public's favourite series of Big Brother.

== Housemates ==
Fourteen housemates entered the House on launch night, and eight other housemates entered the House later during the series, making a total of twenty-two housemates competing in Big Brother 7. Two of these eight housemates were replacement housemates Sam and Aisleyne, arriving on Day 12, who were introduced to the housemates as part of the Meal or No Meal task after the departure of Shahbaz and Dawn. George decided to leave the House of his own will, a rule all housemates are allowed to take advantage of at any time, on Day 13. On Day 23, Susie entered the House as Big Brother's lucky Golden Ticket winner. Five more housemates entered on Day 44 (Jonathan, Spiral, Jennie, Michael and Jayne) to the House Next Door.

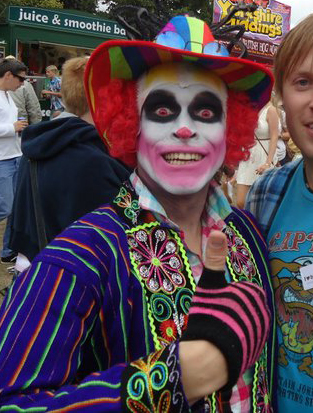
Pete Bennett

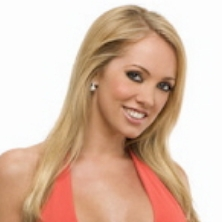
Aisleyne Horgan-Wallace

Name	Age on entry	Hometown	Day entered	Day exited	Result
Pete Bennett	24	Brighton	1	93	Winner
Glyn Wise	18	Blaenau Ffestiniog	1	93	Runner-up
Aisleyne Horgan-Wallace	27	London	12	93	3rd place
Richard Newman	33	London (originally from Canada)	1	93	4th place
Nikki Grahame	24	Hertfordshire	1	58	5th place (Note: The public voted for which four ex-housemates they would like to move into the House Next Door on Day 79. George, Shahbaz, Dawn and Jonathan were not eligible to re-enter as they had not left the House via a public vote. Bonnie and Sezer were also not eligible for legal reasons. Grace, Lea, Mikey and Nikki moved into the House Next Door on Day 83. On Day 86, the housemates in the main house chose Nikki to re-enter the house, where she became eligible to win. Grace, Lea and Mikey were therefore re-evicted.)
Nikki Grahame	24	Hertfordshire	83	93	5th place
Jennie Corner	18	Liverpool	44	93	6th place
Imogen Thomas	23	Llanelli	1	86	Evicted
Susie Verrico	43	Kent	23	79	Evicted
Mikey Dalton	23	Liverpool	1	79	Evicted
Mikey Dalton	23	Liverpool	83	86	Evicted
Glen "Spiral" Coroner	22	Dublin	44	72	Evicted
Michael Cheshire	23	Manchester	44	72	Evicted
Jayne Kitt	36	Slough	44	65	Evicted
Lea Walker	35	Nottingham	1	51	Evicted
Lea Walker	35	Nottingham	83	86	Evicted
Jonathan Leonard	24	Cumbria	44	49	Evicted
Lisa Huo	27	Manchester (originally from China)	1	37	Evicted
Grace Adams-Short	20	London	1	30	Evicted
Grace Adams-Short	20	London	83	86	Evicted
Sam Brodie	19	Ayrshire (originally from Indonesia)	12	23	Evicted
Sezer Yurtseven	26	London	1	16	Evicted
George Askew	19	London	1	13	Walked
Bonnie Holt	20	Loughborough	1	9	Evicted
Dawn Blake	38	Birmingham	1	8	Ejected
Shahbaz Chauhdry	37	Glasgow	1	6	Walked

== Nominations table ==
	Week 1	Week 2	Week 3	Week 4	Week 5	Week 6	Week 7	Week 8	Week 9	Week 10	Week 11	Week 12	Week 13 Final		Nominations received
Pete	In Big; Brotherhood	Imogen, Sezer	Lisa, Nikki	Not eligible	Imogen, Lisa	Susie, Aisleyne	Banned	No nominations	Spiral, Michael	Michael	Imogen, Aisleyne	Imogen, Glyn	Winner (Day 93)		3
Glyn	Not in Big; Brotherhood	Grace, Richard	Sam, Nikki	Not eligible	Nikki	Richard, Aisleyne	Pete, Lea	No nominations	Susie, Jayne	Susie	Susie, Richard	Richard, Pete	Runner-up (Day 93)		6
Aisleyne	Not in House	Exempt	Nikki, Sam	Not eligible	Lisa, Mikey	Lea, Nikki	Jonathan	No nominations	Jayne, Richard	Spiral	Mikey, Glyn	Richard, Glyn	Third place (Day 93)		12
Richard	In Big; Brotherhood	Imogen, Sezer	Lisa, Grace	Not eligible	Imogen, Glyn	Imogen, Aisleyne	Imogen, Glyn	No nominations	Aisleyne, Spiral	Michael	Mikey, Imogen	Aisleyne, Imogen	Fourth place (Day 93)		25
Nikki	In Big; Brotherhood	Lea, Grace	Richard, Sam	Not eligible	Lisa	Aisleyne, Susie	Richard, Lea	No nominations	Evicted (Day 58)			Next; Door	Fifth place (Day 93)		10
Jennie	Not in House						Next; Door	No nominations	Michael, Jayne	Spiral	Susie, Imogen	Aisleyne, Imogen	Sixth place (Day 93)		5
Imogen	In Big; Brotherhood	Banned	Banned	Not eligible	Lea	Richard, Susie	Richard, Lea	No nominations	Richard, Jayne	Michael	Richard, Jennie	Richard, Pete	Evicted (Day 86)		15
Susie	Not in House			Nikki, Grace	Lisa, Mikey	Nikki, Imogen	Lea, Glyn	No nominations	Michael, Spiral	Michael	Mikey, Jennie	Evicted (Day 79)			13
Mikey	In Big; Brotherhood	Richard, Lisa	Sam, Aisleyne	Not eligible	Lea, Susie	Richard, Susie	Richard, Nikki	No nominations	Richard, Susie	Susie	Susie, Jennie	Next; Door	Re-evicted (Day 86)		5
Spiral	Not in House						Next; Door	No nominations	Jennie, Richard	Richard	Evicted (Day 72)				4
Michael	Not in House						Next; Door	No nominations	Jennie, Richard	Richard	Evicted (Day 72)				7
Jayne	Not in House						Exempt	No nominations	Aisleyne, Imogen	Evicted (Day 65)					5
Lea	In Big; Brotherhood	Sezer, Lisa	Nikki, Richard	Not eligible	Imogen	Aisleyne, Susie	Susie, Richard	Evicted (Day 51)				Next; Door	Re-evicted (Day 86)		11
Jonathan	Not in House						Next; Door	Evicted (Day 49)							1
Lisa	In Big; Brotherhood	Lea, Richard	Banned	Not eligible	Nikki	Evicted (Day 37)									8
Grace	In Big; Brotherhood	Lea, Richard	Aisleyne, Sam	Not eligible	Evicted (Day 30)							Next; Door	Re-evicted (Day 86)		4
Sam	Not in House	Exempt	Lea, Richard	Evicted (Day 23)											5
Sezer	In Big; Brotherhood	Banned	Evicted (Day 16)												3
George	In Big; Brotherhood	Not eligible	Walked (Day 13)												N/A
Bonnie	Not in Big; Brotherhood	Evicted (Day 9)													N/A
Dawn	Not in Big; Brotherhood	Ejected (Day 8)													N/A
Shahbaz	In Big; Brotherhood	Walked (Day 6)													N/A
Nomination note	1	2	3	4	5	6	7	8	none	9	10	11, 12	13		
Against public vote	Bonnie, ~~Dawn,~~; Glyn	Lea, Richard, Sezer	Nikki, Sam	Grace, Nikki	Imogen, Lisa, Mikey, Nikki	Aisleyne, Susie	Lea, Richard	Aisleyne, Glyn, Imogen, Jennie, Michael, Mikey, Nikki, Pete, Richard, Spiral, Susie	Jayne, Richard	Imogen & Susie, Michael & Spiral, Pete & Richard	Imogen, Jennie, Mikey, Susie	Imogen, Richard	Aisleyne, Glyn, Jennie, Nikki, Pete, Richard		
Walked	Shahbaz	George	none												
Ejected	Dawn	none													
Evicted	Bonnie; 78% to evict	Sezer; 91.6% to evict	Sam; 53.7% to evict	Grace; 87.9% to evict	Lisa; 60.3% to evict	Aisleyne; 67.3% to move	Jonathan; Aisleyne's choice to evict	Nikki; 37.2% to evict	Jayne; 67.1% to evict	Michael & Spiral; 9.7% to save	Mikey; 48.5% (out of 4) to evict	Imogen; 62% to evict	Jennie; 0.9% (out of 6)	Aisleyne; 22.0% (out of 3)	
Evicted	Bonnie; 78% to evict	Sezer; 91.6% to evict	Sam; 53.7% to evict	Grace; 87.9% to evict	Lisa; 60.3% to evict	Aisleyne; 67.3% to move	Jonathan; Aisleyne's choice to evict	Nikki; 37.2% to evict	Jayne; 67.1% to evict	Michael & Spiral; 9.7% to save	Mikey; 48.5% (out of 4) to evict	Imogen; 62% to evict	Nikki; 6.5% (out of 5)	Aisleyne; 22.0% (out of 3)	
Evicted	Bonnie; 78% to evict	Sezer; 91.6% to evict	Sam; 53.7% to evict	Grace; 87.9% to evict	Lisa; 60.3% to evict	Aisleyne; 67.3% to move	Jonathan; Aisleyne's choice to evict	Nikki; 37.2% to evict	Jayne; 67.1% to evict	Michael & Spiral; 9.7% to save	Mikey; 48.5% (out of 4) to evict	Imogen; 62% to evict	Nikki; 6.5% (out of 5)	Glyn; 38.8% (out of 2)	
Evicted	Bonnie; 78% to evict	Sezer; 91.6% to evict	Sam; 53.7% to evict	Grace; 87.9% to evict	Lisa; 60.3% to evict	Aisleyne; 67.3% to move	Lea; 53.8% to evict	Nikki; 37.2% to evict	Jayne; 67.1% to evict	Michael & Spiral; 9.7% to save	Susie; 59.4% (out of 3) to evict	Nikki; House's choice to re-enter	Richard; 9.2% (out of 4)	Glyn; 38.8% (out of 2)	
Evicted	Bonnie; 78% to evict	Sezer; 91.6% to evict	Sam; 53.7% to evict	Grace; 87.9% to evict	Lisa; 60.3% to evict	Aisleyne; 67.3% to move	Lea; 53.8% to evict	Nikki; 37.2% to evict	Jayne; 67.1% to evict	Michael & Spiral; 9.7% to save	Susie; 59.4% (out of 3) to evict	Nikki; House's choice to re-enter	Pete; 61.2% to win		

Notes

- ^Note 1: There were no nominations in Week 1. Instead, all housemates except Bonnie, Dawn and Glyn formed the Big Brotherhood and were immune from eviction, while the housemates excluded from the Brotherhood did not receive their suitcases and faced the public vote. Because Dawn was ejected from the house, it was only Bonnie and Glyn that faced the public vote.
- ^Note 2: As punishment for discussing nominations, Sezer and Imogen were banned from nominating. As new housemates, Aisleyne and Sam could not nominate and could not be nominated by their fellow housemates. George had walked before nominations were made.
- ^Note 3: Imogen was banned from nominating on Day 15 because the night before, she had disclosed to her fellow housemates the fact that she was unable to nominate the previous week. Lisa was also banned on Day 18 after telling Imogen who she nominated in the previous week.
- ^Note 4: As the Golden Housemate, only Susie was eligible to nominate this week. Lisa could not be nominated, having won a task set by Big Brother. The two housemates Susie nominated were Grace and Nikki.
- ^Note 5: During the previous week, Glyn, Imogen, Lea, Lisa and Nikki discussed nominations. As punishment, the five of them had to each nominate one of their fellow rule-breakers in front of their fellow housemates. The one or more housemate(s) with the most nominations would face eviction; Nikki was chosen. The remaining housemates nominated as normal, selecting from everyone except Nikki.
- ^Note 6: This week's public vote was not to evict a housemate, but to vote them into the House Next Door. The housemates nominated as usual, but were unaware of the fake eviction or of the House Next Door. Aisleyne was not evicted, but instead moved next door.
- ^Note 7: Aisleyne was told that she had to evict four of the five new housemates who were living in the House Next Door. However, she was not told that the first three housemates she chose would join the others in the main house. Her fourth nomination, for Jonathan, was for real, and he was evicted. Aisleyne, Jennie, Jonathan, Michael and Spiral were in the House Next Door during the nominations, and therefore did not take part. As a new housemate, Jayne could not nominate and could not be nominated by her fellow housemates. As punishment for telling Aisleyne he had nominated her the previous week, Pete was banned from nominating.
- ^Note 8: As punishment for Jayne discussing the outside world, nominations were cancelled and everyone except Jayne automatically faced the public vote.
- ^Note 9: The housemates were put into pairs of "Best Friends": these were Aisleyne & Jennie; Glyn & Mikey; Imogen & Susie; Pete & Richard and Michael & Spiral. Each pair nominated one housemate. The housemates with the most nominations faced eviction with their "Best Friend". Unlike previous weeks, this week was a vote to save.
- ^Note 10: As part of an ongoing task, housemates had to nominate using an 'Automated Big Brother' phone system. Whilst announcing nominations, 'Automated Big Brother' "broke down", having only announced Imogen's name. Unbeknownst to the housemates, this week was a double eviction.
- ^Note 11: After Susie's eviction on Day 79, the public voted for which 4 ex-housemates they would like to move into the House Next Door. George, Shahbaz, Dawn and Jonathan were not eligible to re-enter as they had not left the House via a Public vote. Bonnie and Sezer were also not eligible for legal reasons. On Day 83, Grace, Lea, Mikey and Nikki moved into the House Next Door.
- ^Note 12: Jennie won a task set by Big Brother and was given a guaranteed place in the final. On Day 86, the housemates in the main house (excluding Glyn, who was punished for attempting to enter the House Next Door after hearing former housemates were in there) chose Nikki to re-enter the house, where she became eligible to win. Grace, Lea and Mikey were therefore re-evicted.
- ^Note 13 There were no nominations in the final week. The public were voting for the housemate they wanted to win, rather than evict.

== Weekly summary ==
Week 1	Entrances	On Day 1, Bonnie, Pete, George, Shahbaz, Lea, Imogen, Mikey, Dawn, Glyn, Richard, Grace, Lisa, Sezer and Nikki entered the house.
Week 1	Twists	This week no nominations took place. Instead, housemates were put into a group, known as "The Big Brotherhood". They were elected by group leaders Lisa and Shahbaz. Throughout the week, Lisa and Shahbaz picked housemates to join "The Big Brotherhood". These housemates received their suitcases and immunity from eviction.
Week 1	Nominations	Bonnie, Dawn and Glyn were not selected to join "The Big Brotherhood" and were nominated for eviction. After Dawn was ejected from the house on Day 8, the nominations remained the same with Bonnie and Glyn still facing the public vote.
Week 1	Exits	On Day 6, Shahbaz walked from the house.; On Day 8, Dawn was ejected from the house after she revealed that she was using a code to receive information from the outside world.; On Day 9, Bonnie was evicted from the house, receiving 78% of the public vote to evict.
Week 2	Entrances	On Day 12, Aisleyne and Sam entered the house.
Week 2	Tasks	The housemates were given a task in which they had to answer various questions in order to win sections of a luxury food budget they had ordered, in a game show-style "Meal or No Meal".; On Day 13, Pete was given a task in which he was asked the questions that were answered incorrectly from the "Meal or No Meal" task. Answering questions right would result in prizes. Getting three out of four right, Pete won the house toilet rolls, miscellaneous shopping list items, and new housemates Aisleyne and Sam.
Week 2	Punishments	Due to discussing nominations, Imogen and Sezer were banned from nominating this week.
Week 2	Nominations	The housemates nominated for the first time. Lea, Richard and Sezer received the most nominations and faced the public vote. Due to being new housemates, Aisleyne and Sam were exempt from the nomination process.
Week 2	Exits	On Day 14, George walked from the house.; On Day 16, Sezer was evicted from the house, receiving 91.6% of the public vote to evict.
Week 3	Tasks	On Day 18, the housemates were set a task in which they had to "shout" a word the loudest to win a luxury reward. Richard won the task and chose Imogen to share a dinner with him.; The housemates were given their next shopping task, in which the housemates had to work at Big Brother's Temp Agency, where housemates were given different jobs, such as lifeguard, chef, toilet attendant, and PA. The housemates failed their shopping task and received basic rations for the week.
Week 3	Punishments	Due to discussing nominations, Imogen and Lisa were banned from nominating this week.
Week 3	Nominations	The housemates nominated for the second time. Nikki and Sam received the most nominations and faced the public vote.
Week 3	Exits	On Day 22, Sam was evicted from the house receiving 53.7% of the public vote to evict.
Week 4	Entrances	On Day 23, the housemates were told about the "Golden Ticket" competition, and that a housemate would randomly select a new housemate from the various winners to enter the house. Susie was randomly selected and entered the house.
Week 4	Tasks	On Day 25, the housemates were given a task called "The Waiting Game", where they all had to stand on a podium to win a reward in the Box of Good Things. Housemates were permitted to quit if they put their hands up and state their reasons. If the housemates' feet touched the floor, they were automatically out of the game. After drawing straws with Grace, Lisa was the housemate on her podium the longest, with a total of 10 hours and 12 minutes. Her prize ended up being immunity from this week's eviction.; The housemates were given their next weekly shopping task, in which Big Brother turned the house into "The State of Susie". The house was adorned with images and statues of Susie. Susie was given the role of "dictatorship" and the other housemates as her followers. The housemates were allowed three fails to be able to pass the task. The housemates failed their task, four hours after it began, with a total of 33 fails.
Week 4	Nominations	As a new housemate, Susie was the only housemate allowed to nominate this week. As Lisa won immunity for the week, she was not allowed to be nominated. Susie nominated Grace and Nikki to face the public vote.
Week 4	Exits	On Day 30, Grace was evicted from the house, receiving 87.9% of the public vote to evict.
Week 5	Tasks	The housemates were given their next weekly shopping task, in which they had to perform a baton routine, dressed up as majorettes. Glyn was appointed leader and led the housemates. The housemates passed their shopping task, and received a luxury shopping budget for the week.
Week 5	Punishments	On Day 34, Glyn, Imogen, Lea, Lisa and Nikki were announced to have been discussing nominations. As a punishment, each housemate would name the housemate "rule-breaker" they believe should automatically face the public vote. Glyn and Lisa chose Nikki, Imogen chose Lea, Lea chose Imogen, and Nikki chose Lisa. As Nikki received the most votes, she automatically faced the public vote.
Week 5	Nominations	The housemates nominated for the third time. Imogen, Lisa and Mikey received the most nominations and faced the public vote with Nikki.
Week 5	Exits	On Day 37, Lisa was evicted from the house, receiving 60.3% of the public vote to evict.
Week 6	Tasks	The housemates were given a task in which they had to rub another housemate with soap until all of the soap was gone. Glyn, Imogen and Susie won the task and won a prize of a luxury spa.; The housemates were given a task in which they had to stop milk from emptying out of a tank within a 48-hour period. Imogen was given a secret mission, in which she had to sabotage the task by letting the milk empty below the red line point, without the other housemates knowledge. Imogen passed her secret mission, and the housemates received a luxury shopping budget for the week.; On Day 43, the housemates were given a task in which they had to write in a suggestion box ways that the other housemates could improve. The following day, these suggestions were read aloud, and the housemates were provided with things to help them better themselves. If the housemates could last the next few hours bettering themselves, they would receive a prize. The housemates passed this task and won a karaoke party.
Week 6	Nominations	The housemates nominated for the fourth time. Aisleyne and Susie received the most nominations and faced the public vote.
Week 6	Exits	On Day 45, Aisleyne was evicted from the house, receiving 67.3% of the public vote to evict. This however was a fake eviction. Aisleyne then entered the "House Next Door".
Week 7	Entrances	On Day 45, Jayne, Jennie, Jonathan, Michael and Spiral entered the "House Next Door".
Week 7	Tasks	On Day 45, the housemates in the Main House were given a silent disco dancing task, in which the housemates had to stay on a spot dancing along to three songs on repeat whilst blindfolded. The person who lasted the longest would win a prize from the Box of Good Things. Glyn won the task and was given a small trophy.; On Day 50, the housemates were given their next weekly shopping task, in which they had to work together to untangle themselves from a giant knot in the garden within 3 hours. Each housemates was attached to a belt to an individual piece of rope. A television screen displayed £672, double a luxury shopping budget. This money decreased by £10, every 3 minutes they carried out the task. The housemates completed this task in 44 minutes, and earned £532 for their shopping budget this week.
Week 7	Twists	During the week, Aisleyne had to decide which housemates to evict from the "House Next Door", unaware that she was sending them into the Main House. On Day 46, she evicted Jayne. On Day 48, she evicted Michael and Jennie. On Day 49, Aisleyne then had to decide which housemate left in the "House Next Door", she wanted to permanently evict from the house.
Week 7	Nominations	The housemates nominated for the fifth time. Lea and Richard received the most nominations and faced the public vote.
Week 7	Exits	On Day 49, Aisleyne was forced to evict either Jonathan or Spiral. The housemate she evicted would permanently be evicted from the house. She chose to evict Jonathan. Aisleyne and Spiral then entered the Main House shortly after.; On Day 51, Lea was evicted from the house, receiving 53.8% of the public vote to evoct.
Week 8	Tasks	On Day 54, the housemates were given a task in which they participated in the "Big Brother Tennis Championship", where the housemates played a game of tennis against Big Brother. The housemates won seven games, and were rewarded with a party.; On Day 56, the housemates were given a task in which each housemate had one minute to perform as many burps as they could. If the house collectively performed 200 burps, then they would receive a prize. The housemates performed 252 burps collectively, and won a children's party.
Week 8	Punishments	Following Jayne relaying her impressions of the other housemates from before she had entered the house, all of the housemates, except for her, were nominated for eviction.; On Day 56, following further rule breaking by Jayne, concerning discussions of information from the outside world, the weekly shopping task was cancelled, and the housemates would not be allowed to buy any items from the shopping list. Instead, they received basic food rations.
Week 8	Nominations	Due to multiple rule-breaking by Jayne, this week's nominations were cancelled, and everyone, except for Jayne, faced the public vote.
Week 8	Exits	On Day 58, Nikki was evicted from the house, receiving 37.2% of the public vote to evict.
Week 9	Tasks	On Day 59, after multiple rule-breaking from Jayne, the housemates were given a Rule School task. They had to answer an exam paper with eighteen questions regarding the rules of Big Brother. All housemates had to pass with 100% to avoid further punishment. The housemates ended up failing, which eventually ended up with the swimming pool being out of bounds.; On Day 61, the housemates were given a walking task. Each housemate was given a pedometer and was asked to walk around the house for two hours. It was revealed that Glyn had walked the most steps, and received a luxury meal of his choice. It was then revealed to him that the meal that he ordered, was given to him in the form of a smoothie, which he was forced to taste.; The housemates were given a task, in which they had to complete an assault course. The housemates passed this task and won an 80's-themed party, along with a luxury shopping budget for the following week.
Week 9	Nominations	The housemates nominated for the sixth time. Jayne and Richard received the most nominations and faced the public vote.
Week 9	Exits	On Day 65, Jayne was evicted from the house, receiving 67.1% of the public vote to evict.
Week 10	Tasks	The housemates were given their next weekly shopping task, in which the "House Next Door", became a prison. The housemates passed their shopping task and earned a luxury shopping budget, along with letters from home.
Week 10	Twists	This week, the housemates were each paired up with their "best friends". The pairs were: Aisleyne & Jennie, Glyn & Mikey, Imogen & Susie, Michael & Spiral and Pete & Richard. Each pair would have to choose a single fellow housemate to nominate for eviction. Big Brother then announced that the nominated housemates, along with their "best friends", would be up for eviction. The pair with the lowest share of the public vote would be evicted.
Week 10	Nominations	The housemates nominated for the seventh time. Michael, Richard, Spiral and Susie received the most nominations, meaning that Imogen & Susie, Michael & Spiral and Pete & Richard faced the public vote.
Week 10	Exits	On Day 72, Michael and Spiral were evicted from the house, receiving 9.7% of the public vote to save.
Week 11	Tasks	On Day 75, Big Brother went on holiday, leaving the housemates with an automated service as a temporary replacement. Housemates were told to make postcards for Big Brother. The housemates passed the task and were rewarded with a sleepover and pajama party.; The housemates were given their next weekly shopping task, in which they had to learn five different things, similar to a university course. The housemates passed their shopping task and earned a luxury shopping budget for the next week. The graduation was celebrated with a party.
Week 11	Nominations	The housemates nominated for the eighth time. Imogen, Jennie, Mikey and Susie received the most nominations and faced the public vote.
Week 11	Exits	On Day 79, Mikey and Susie were evicted from the house, receiving 48.5% and 59.4% of the public vote to evict, respectively.
Week 12	Entrances	On Day 84, previously evicted housemates Grace, Lea, Mikey and Nikki entered the "House Next Door".
Week 12	Twists	After Grace, Lea, Mikey and Nikki entered the "House Next Door", they were told that one of them would re-enter the house and be eligible to win. On Day 86, Nikki was chosen by the other housemates to return to the house. Grace, Lea and Mikey left the Big Brother compound later that night.; After Imogen and Richard were told that they faced the public vote, they moved into the "House Next Door" until one of them was evicted. Richard re-entered the house after being saved by the public vote.
Week 12	Tasks	The housemates were given a task called the "Big Brother Board Game". Jennie was the winner of this task and was rewarded with a bottle of champagne and a place in the final.; The housemates were given a task in which they had to pretend to be DJs. The housemates passed this task and was awarded with a luxury shopping budget.
Week 12	Punishments	Glyn was reprimanded by Big Brother after climbing on the roof and trying to get into the "House Next Door" after hearing news that four ex-housemates were living there.
Week 12	Nominations	The housemates nominated for the ninth and final time. Due to Jennie winning a place in the final, she was unable to be nominated, but could still nominate. Imogen and Richard received the most nominations and faced the public vote.
Week 12	Exits	On Day 86, Imogen was evicted from the house, receiving 62% of the public vote to evict.
Week 13	Tasks	The housemates were given a task in which they had to compete in a slow bicycle race. Pete won the race and was rewarded with a disco for one in the diary room with free alcohol.; The housemates were given a task in which they had to form a dance troupe. They passed the task and were rewarded with two bottles of wine.; The housemates were given a task called "Before They Were Housemates".; The housemates were given a task in which they had to write a "future autobiography".; The housemates were given a task of becoming "Political Campaigners". Each housemate was required to convince the audience that another housemate should win Big Brother.
Week 13	Exits	On Day 93, Jennie left the house in sixth place, Nikki left the house in fifth place, Richard left the house in fourth place, and Aisleyne left the house in third place. It was then revealed that Pete was the winner, leaving Glyn as the runner-up.

== Production ==
=== Eye logo ===
The eye this year featured two spiral shapes, one black and one yellow.

=== Title sequence ===
The title sequence contained phrases such as, at the very beginning with a screen resembling an FBI Anti-Piracy Warning: "This is the title sequence for Big Brother", "In agreeing to take part in Big Brother you agree to abide by the rules. Big Brother reserves the right to change the rules at any time." "NOT FOR TRANSMISSION", "Big Brother's decision is final", and a copyright year of 1903 (written MCMIII), the birth year of George Orwell. Parts of the sequence include CCTV-style footage of the Wandsworth Underpass featured at the start of the film version of A Clockwork Orange. The time and date displayed at the bottom keep repeating the digit seven, signifying the seventh series of the show. Other words flashed on screen included "You are being observed", and, in sequence the text "cam 01", "cam 09", "cam 08" and "cam 04" was shown at the top of the screen, making 1984, another reference to Nineteen Eighty-Four.

=== Broadcasts ===
Davina McCall hosted the main eviction show, as well as the live launch and finale. She would also host the main Channel 4 show on other nights, that may involve a twist or a new housemate arriving. The nightly highlight shows were once again narrated by Marcus Bentley. This was the last series to feature a highlights show the night after the finale, showing the housemates last day in the house.

Dermot O'Leary returned as host of Big Brother's Little Brother on Channel 4, he also hosted Big Brother's Big Brain, a new psychology show broadcast late on Monday nights on Channel 4, usually after the main show.

For the first time since BB launched, live action was available exclusively online, with paid subscription, through the official Channel 4 website; Channel 4 claimed that the decision to cease any live streaming to terrestrial, cable or satellite channels, was as a direct result of the public outrage which followed the "Fight Night" incident in last years show, however many fans were of the belief that this was simply Channel 4 and programme makers Endemol 'cashing in'. Diary Room Uncut returned and was extended to one hour and broadcast on Saturday nights, as well as a half hour segment on Monday nights.

Russell Brand returned for Big Brother's Big Mouth in a new late-night time slot, straight after the Channel 4 show, having previously obtained this slot during the previous celebrity series. As a result of the time slot, the show had a more adult theme. It was broadcast Tuesday to Friday.

=== Sponsor ===
The Carphone Warehouse remained as sponsor.

=== House ===
House plan with the House Next Door highlighted

The interior of the house was much smaller than the year before. The living room was brought back inside the house, with two glass doors separating it from the main floor area. On Launch Night, McCall said the room will change colour depending on what mood the housemates were in, however the walls only changed colour on eviction nights. The bedroom was across from the living room, and featured a waterbed. The bathroom was accessed through the bedroom, and featured a bath, shower and also a toilet. The kitchen was small and beside the door leading to the garden. In the garden, which was much larger than the house, was a barbecue, a pool, a seating area and a bridge titled The Bridge to Nowhere which led to another seating area. The interior stairs remained closed off once again, and had a yellow and black theme.

==== The House Next Door ====
The House Next Door was a group of rooms connected to the original house via the Diary Room. On Day 44, five new housemates entered this house. The public, instead of voting for a housemate to be evicted, voted to transfer one of the current housemates to also live in the new house. Aisleyne was voted to be moved into the House Next Door along with 5 new housemates; Jonathan, Spiral, Jennie, Michael and Jayne. Over the course of her stay in the House Next Door, Aisleyne was required to 'evict' three of her fellow housemates (Jayne, Michael and Jennie respectively), unaware this was an eviction from the House Next Door to the main house. Before returning to the main house on Day 49, she then had to evict one final housemate, whose eviction would be for real. She evicted Jonathan over Spiral. The House Next Door was also used later on in the series. In Week 10 it featured in the "Prison Task" and in Week 12 it housed four previous evictees - Grace, Mikey, Lea and Nikki - all of whom had been voted by the public to re-enter the House.

=== Golden tickets ===
During the first three weeks of the series, Channel 4 conducted a promotion in conjunction with Nestle to distribute 100 "golden tickets" randomly throughout Kit Kat chocolate bars, in a style reminiscent of the story Charlie and the Chocolate Factory. Members of the public finding these tickets were permitted to use them to give themselves a chance to become a Big Brother housemate and bypass the standard auditions process. Golden ticket holders were invited to a television show where one of them, Susie Verrico, was chosen to enter the House by housemate Aisleyne picking a ball out of a machine at random. This contest caused some controversy, with the Advertising Standards Authority saying that the terms and conditions of the draw should have been made clearer in related advertisements, and that an independent adjudicator should have been present before and during the draw.

== Ratings ==
These viewing figures are taken from BARB.

	Week 1		Week 2	Week 3	Week 4	Week 5	Week 6	Week 7	Week 8	Week 9	Week 10	Week 11	Week 12	Week 13
Sat		3.64	3.26	3.17	3.66	3.51	3.24	3.21	3.18	2.87	2.61	3.05	2.78	2.92
Sun		4.67	3.44	3.7	4.95	4.97	4.03	4.87	4.62	3.75	2.41	4.22	3.81	4.82
Mon		4.8	4.98	4.65	5.02	5	4.88	5.56	4.86	4.4	4.22	4.44	4.39	4.85
Tue		5.05	4.24	4.78	4.95	5.04	4.79	4.6	4.86	4.32	4.07	4.45	5.49	4.73
Wed		5.67	5.07	5.05	5.4	3.11	5.33	5.52	4.73	4.58	4.74	4.4	5.15	4.51
Wed		5.67	5.07	5.05	5.4	4.82	5.33	5.52	4.73	4.58	4.74	4.4	5.15	4.51
Thu	7.14	5.17	4.44	4.77	4.79	4.31	4.97	5.08	5.3	4.12	4.94	4.51	4.6	4.5
Fri	5.75	4.55	4.57	4.43	4.76	5.14	4.65	4.93	4.71	4.46	4.7	5.03	5.59	6.43
Fri	5.75	4.78	5.43	5.19	6.35	5.77	6.24	5.82	6.16	4.95	4.68	5.89	5.74	8.2
Weekly average	5.12		4.43	4.47	4.98	4.63	4.77	4.95	4.8	4.18	4.05	4.5	4.69	5.12
Running average	5.12		4.81	4.71	4.77	4.74	4.74	4.77	4.77	4.65	4.63	4.64	4.64	4.68
Series average	4.68													

== Criticism and controversy ==
=== Selection of certain housemates ===
The programme attracted criticism on 31 May for putting several vulnerable people in the Big Brother House. Pete has Tourette syndrome. Shahbaz threatened to take his own life on live television. He was being monitored by production team psychologists after commenting on how he intended to take his own life whilst in the house. Many of the housemates were bullying Shahbaz. He left the house on Day 6. Shahbaz admitted after leaving the house that he downplayed his mental condition during the selection process.

Lea suffers from body dysmorphic disorder; Sam has admitted to being shunned by family members because of their homosexuality and gender identity; and Nikki has suffered from anorexia and been sectioned in the past due to the condition.

=== Welsh language criticism ===
Further criticism arose when Welsh contestant Glyn Wise was reprimanded for communicating in his first language, Welsh, with fellow Welsh housemate Imogen Thomas. Big Brother deemed this a form of 'code' and issued a warning to Glyn, who retorted "But Welsh is a British language". Following the incident, the Welsh Language Society complained to Channel 4, the regulator Ofcom and S4C. Clearly, it was no longer a problem after this as Glyn and Imogen continued to converse in Welsh. Such discussions were broadcast with English-language subtitles.

=== Return of ex-housemates ===
On Day 83, four previous evictees entered the 'House Next Door' following a public vote between ten previous Housemates. Nikki received 63% of the vote, whilst Grace got 8.4%, and Lea and Mikey 7.3% each. Their presence was revealed to the other housemates and Imogen and Richard, who were up for eviction that week, joined them. Nikki was chosen by the remaining housemates to return to the Big Brother House and become eligible to win the £100,000 prize money and Grace, Mikey and Lea left the House Next Door.

This decision to allow previous evictees to become eligible to win the show was criticised. Channel 4 received 500 complaints from viewers about this matter and Media watchdog Ofcom confirmed that it had received over 1,000 complaints, and referred viewers to ICSTIS. Soon after the four ex-housemates entered the House Next Door, ICSTIS released a statement confirming that it was dealing with over 2,500 complaints and launched an official investigation. On 5 October 2006, they ruled that Channel 4 had breached its code and imposed £50,000 'administrative charges'.

On the day prior to the voting results being announced, however, Channel 4 stated that it still considered the vote to be a success as they had already received 400,000 votes, making it the most successful of the series. 36p from each call and 26p from each text also went to charity, raising over £250,000 for charity on the vote alone. The money was split among three charities: Shelter, The Teenage Cancer Trust and the winning housemate's chosen charity, which Pete chose as the Tourette's Association.
