= Pete Bennett =

English television personality and actor

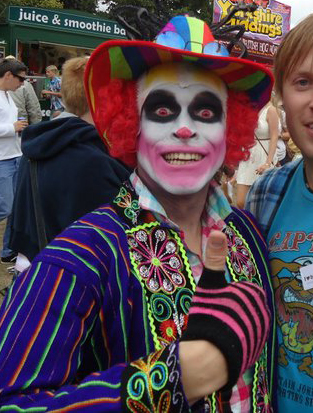
- Bennett at Brighton Pride in 2010
- Born: Peter Alexander Bennett; 22 March 1982 (age 43); London, England
- Occupations: Television personality; actor; musician
- Years active: 2006–present
- Television: Big Brother 7
- Spouse: Gemma Costin (m. 2010; div. 2021)

Peter Alexander Bennett (born 22 March 1982) is an English television personality, actor and musician, who rose to fame after winning the seventh series of the Channel 4 reality series Big Brother in 2006. He has Tourette syndrome.

== Career ==
In 2006, Bennett was selected as one of the original 14 housemates for the seventh series. He won the series with 61.2% of the final vote.

A TSA spokesperson said the series "has put Tourette's on the map".

Later in 2006, Bennett was nominated for a National Television Award in 2006 for "Most Popular TV Contender"; however, this was awarded to fellow Big Brother contestant Nikki Grahame.

Bennett's autobiography, Pete: My Story, was published in hardback in November 2006 and reissued in paperback in 2007 as My Journey with Tourettes.

Bennett was also the lead singer in a band called Daddy Fantastic, but he left the band after agreeing with a record label that he should become a solo artist. He then wrote music with songwriter and record producer Guy Chambers. Bennett went on to form another band, Pete Bennett and the Love Dogs, which played at Glastonbury, and venues such as IndigO2 and The Cavern Club.

In 2013, he guest starred on the web series GIFTED in the pilot episode.

In 2016, he set up a cleaning business called Celebriclean which folded in 2018.

== Filmography ==
Television and film roles
Year	Title	Role	Notes
2006	Big Brother	Himself	Winner
2006	Friday Night with Jonathan Ross	Himself	Guest
2007	The Friday Night Project	Himself	Guest
2010	The Story of F***	Himself	
2011	Big Brother's Bit on the Side	Himself	1 episode; panelist
2014	Mind Set	Himself	Short film
2014	The Mothertown	Reporter	Film
2015	XD Junction	Overlord Corson	1 episode
2015	The Slayers	Vampire	Film
2016	Female Zombie Riot	Bertie Dumble	Film
2016	Clown Syndrome	Frizbee	Television special
2016–2017	London Calling	Himself	2 episodes
2017	Crispy's Curse	Steve Smith	Film
2018	I Need Help	Roger	Short film
2018	Jack Southeast	Billy	Short film
2018	Coulrophobia	Twitch Grock	Short film
2019–2022	Green Fingers	Des	TV series
2019	Tales of the Creeping Death	TBA	Film
2019	Rotten Cotton	TBA	Film
2022	The Nan Movie	Bradley	Film
