= Martin Doherty (historian) =

Martin A. Doherty is a British academic who has been Head of the Department of History, Sociology and Criminology at the University of Westminster since 2011.

== Career ==
Doherty studied history and politics at the London School of Economics and Political Science, the Queen's University Belfast, Central London Polytechnic (later the University of Westminster) and the University of Kent at Canterbury. Doherty's PhD focused on British public opinion in World War II and Nazi propaganda attempts in Britain. He was appointed to a teaching position at the University of Westminster in 1993 and since 2011 has been head of its Department of History, Sociology and Criminology.

== Research ==
Doherty's research focuses on wartime propaganda and nineteenth-century Irish history, with an emphasis on sectarian grievances and propaganda during the Irish War of Independence. His later work has focused on the Troubles and anti-terrorist policy in Northern Ireland. His published works include:

- Nazi Wireless Propaganda: Lord Haw-Haw and British Public Opinion in the Second World War (Edinburgh: Edinburgh University Press, 2000).
- "Kevin Barry and the Anglo-Irish Propaganda War", Irish Historical Studies, 32:126 (2000), pp. 217–231.
- "The attack on the Altmark: a case study in wartime propaganda", Journal of Contemporary History, 38:2 (2003), pp. 187–200.
- "Religion, community relations and constructive unionism: the Arlow disturbances of 1890-1892", in Murphy, J. H. (ed.), Evangelicals and Catholics in Nineteenth-Century Ireland (Dublin: Four Courts Press, 2005), pp. 223–234.
- "Tackling the terrorists: the experience of internment without trial in Northern Ireland", Journal on European History of Law, 6:1 (2015), pp. 76–83.
