= Martin Doherty (Irish republican) =

Provisional IRA volunteer (1958–1994)

- Born: 11 July 1958; Finglas, Dublin, Ireland
- Died: 21 May 1994 (aged 35); Widow Scallans pub, Dublin, Ireland
- Burial place: Glasnevin Cemetery
- Military career
- Paramilitary: Provisional Irish Republican Army
- Unit: Dublin Brigade
- Conflict: The Troubles

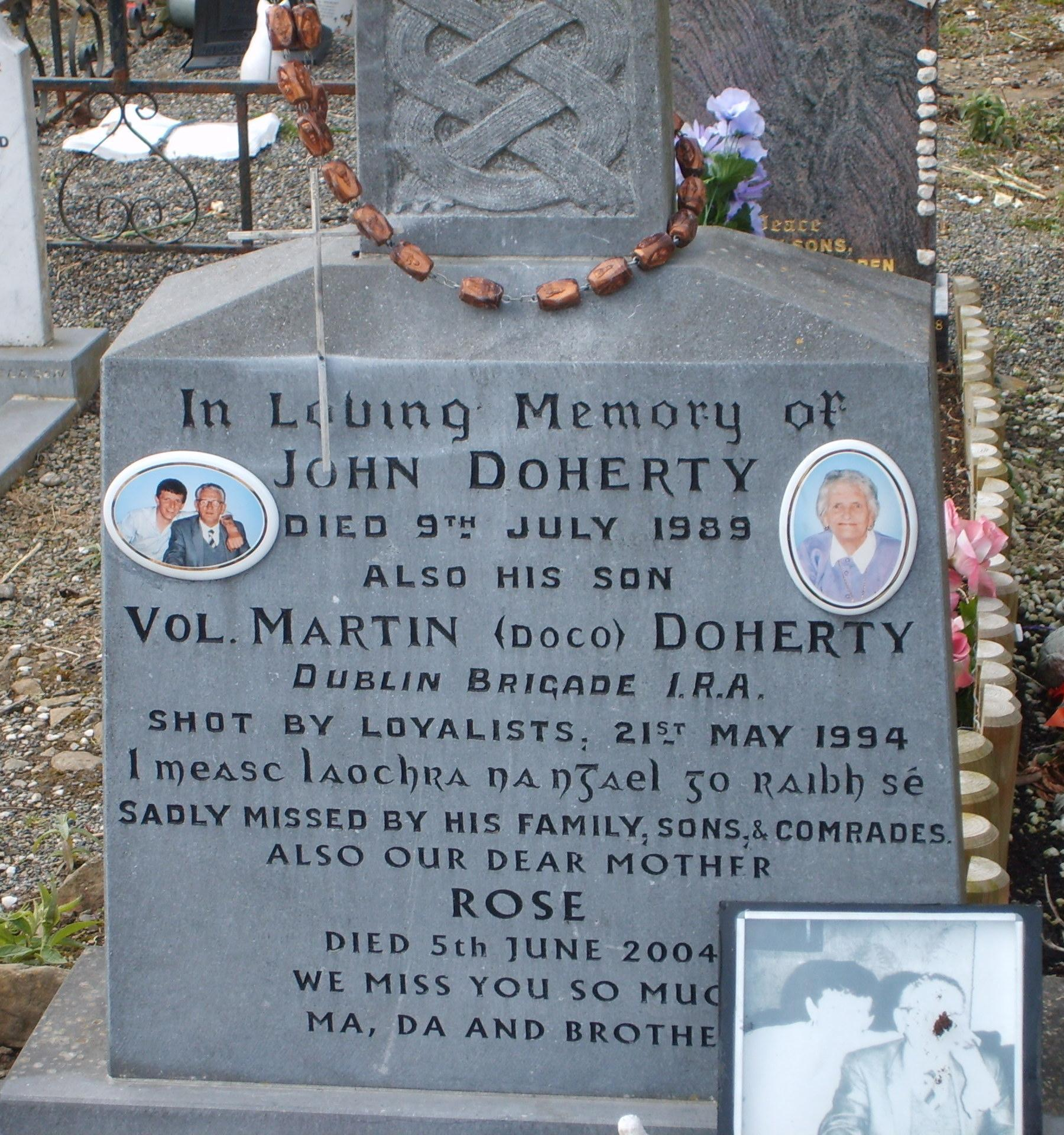
Doherty's gravestone in Glasnevin Cemetery.

Martin "Doco" Doherty (11 July 1958 – 21 May 1994) was a volunteer in the Provisional Irish Republican Army (IRA), who was shot dead while attempting to prevent a bombing by the Ulster Volunteer Force (UVF) at a pub in Dublin, Ireland. Doherty was the first person to be killed in the Republic by the UVF since 1975.

== Background and IRA activity ==
Doherty was born on 11 July 1958 in the Finglas area of Dublin, into a family of five brothers and six sisters. He played soccer for a club in Dunsink, in addition to Gaelic football. He joined the Provisional IRA's Dublin Brigade following the death of ten Irish republican hunger strikers in the 1981 Irish hunger strike. In 1982 Doherty was arrested and imprisoned in Portlaoise Prison due to the actions of a Garda informant, and was released in 1988. Following his release from prison Doherty began working as a labourer in the construction industry. He also returned to active service in the Provisional IRA's armed campaign in England. Doherty was arrested on his second visit to England and charged with conspiring to cause explosions, before being released in January 1991 due to lack of evidence and returning home. He was served with an exclusion order preventing him from entering the United Kingdom.

== Death ==
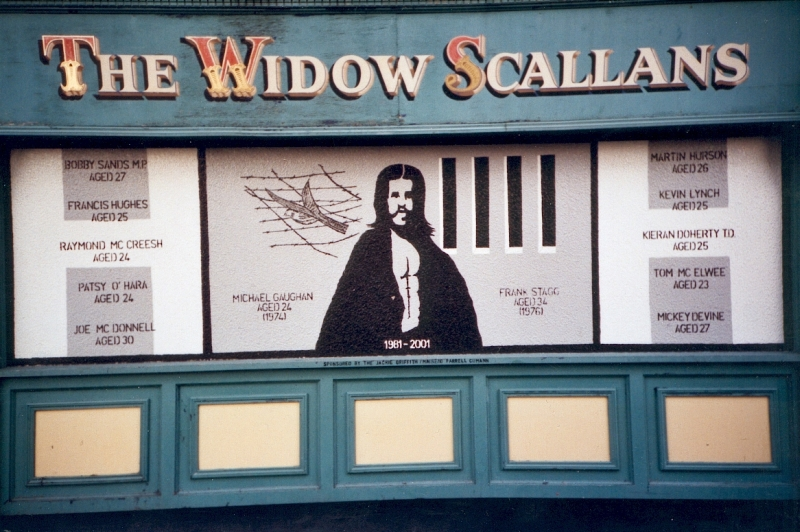
The Widow Scallans pub in Dublin

On 21 May 1994 an event was organised by Sinn Féin's Prisoner of War Department featuring rebel band The Irish Brigade to raise funds for the families of IRA prisoners at the Widow Scallans pub in Dublin's Pearse Street. Doherty was working as a doorman at the pub, and became suspicious of two men attempting to enter the pub carrying a holdall at 11 pm. Doherty challenged the men to prevent them entering the pub, was shot three times and later died in the hospital. Another doorman was seriously injured when he was shot in the throat through the door of the pub after he closed it to prevent the gunmen entering. The gunmen left the scene in a car driven by a third man, leaving behind the holdall which contained an 18 lb bomb. The bomb's detonator exploded as people attended to Doherty and the other injured doorman, but the main explosives failed to ignite. The Gardaí stated a massacre had been avoided due to the bomb failing to explode properly.

The attempted bombing was the first in Dublin since the 1970s, and Doherty was the first person killed in the Republic by the UVF since November 1975. The UVF issued a statement claiming responsibility for the shootings and attempted bombing, saying they had "struck at the very heart of the republican movement in its own back yard" and that "the UVF would warn the IRA and the Dublin government that the Ulster people will neither be coerced nor persuaded and will remain masters of their own destiny".

== Aftermath ==
Annual Commemoration march for IRA Volunteer Martin "Doco" Doherty, May 2010. The event is organised by Sinn Féin.

The IRA issued a statement that Doherty had been a member of the organisation, saying that he "died heroically in the defence of others at Widow Scallans . . . his courage and quick thinking during the attack undoubtedly saved many lives". As Doherty's coffin was being removed from his home in Finglas a paramilitary display took place, with a ten-strong IRA colour party dressed in leather jackets and berets saluting his coffin, which was draped in the Irish Tricolour with a beret and pair of black gloves placed on top. Doherty was buried at Glasnevin Cemetery, where Martin McGuinness gave the oration, stating:

We have come to bury a brave republican Volunteer . . . As far as I am concerned he was a freedom fighter, a freedom seeker. He was trying to bring about a democratic Ireland. The opposition parties are nothing short of Quislings and West Brits. They don't want to talk about the causes of the conflict. Sinn Féin is trying to get all the parties involved in a Peace Process. We will not be distracted from that process.

Photos of the paramilitary display at Doherty's funeral appeared in Irish newspapers causing John Bruton, the leader of opposition party Fine Gael, to criticise the government during a debate in Dáil Éireann. Bruton called the display "appalling, provocative and dangerous for everybody living in this city", and demanded the government enforce the law, which resulted in the debate being adjourned for thirty minutes in "uproar". A spokesman for the Fianna Fáil government stated that similar displays had occurred when Fine Gael were in power.

An inquest into Doherty's death in November 2004 returned a verdict of unlawful killing by person or persons unknown. In 2006 a Garda superintendent stated the investigation into Doherty's death was ongoing, and that "We still have an unsolved murder and the file remains open. To date, no one has been made amenable". Doherty's family believe the Irish authorities are withholding key information about the case, and are demanding answers from the Irish government. Sinn Féin justice spokesman Aengus Ó Snodaigh pledged to raise this issue with the Minister for Justice, Equality and Law Reform, stating "Clearly the Irish government has very serious questions to answer about the ability of unionist death squads, led frequently by British agents, to attack and target Irish citizens with apparent impunity in this jurisdiction".

In September 2026 Doherty's family launched proceedings against Fiosrú, the Garda Ombudsman, alleging a failure to investigate incidents that occurred during the Troubles. Doherty is regarded as a martyr by Irish republicans, with the Clonakilty cumann of Sinn Féin and the Martin Doherty Republican Flute Band named after him in Govan Glasgow, as well as the Nassau County chapter of the Irish Northern Aid Committee in the United States. An annual commemoration march from the Dick McKee memorial in Finglas village to nearby Glasnevin Cemetery takes place each year.

== See also ==
- List of unsolved murders (1980–1999)
