= Christy Dignam =

Irish singer

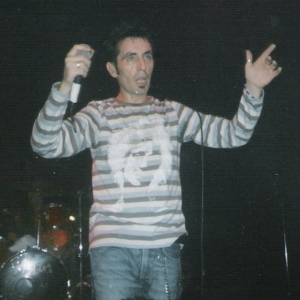
- Dignam onstage circa 2004

Background information
- Born: Christopher Dignam; 23 May 1960; Finglas, Dublin, Ireland
- Died: 13 June 2023 (aged 63)
- Genres: Rock
- Occupations: Musician; songwriter
- Instrument: Vocalist
- Years active: 1980–2023
- Label: EMI
- Formerly of: Aslan; Dignam & Goff
- Website: aslan.ie

Christopher Dignam (23 May 1960 – 13 June 2023) was an Irish singer who was best known as the lead singer of the popular Irish rock band Aslan. His career of over 40 years was characterised by numerous successes on the Irish charts as well as recurring problems with drug addiction and recovery.

== Early life ==
Dignam was born in the National Maternity Hospital on Holles Street in Dublin on 23 May 1960. His father, Christopher Dignam Sr, worked for CIÉ as an upholsterer. He grew up in the north Dublin suburb of Finglas, attending Naomh Feargal primary school and Patrician College. At the age of six, he was raped by a neighbour. That continued to occur over a three-year period until at the age of nine, Dignam sought help from his best friend's brother, a man in his twenties. During the meeting with his best friend's brother, Dignam talked about his situation and he was then raped by that man as well. Dignam later suggested his drug addiction may have resulted from the psychological trauma caused by the events.

He studied the classical art of bel canto singing with teacher Frank Merriman at the Bel Canto House School of Singing in Dublin, attending lessons alongside Hothouse Flowers frontman Fiachna Ó Braonáin.

== Music career ==
In 1980, Dignam and his childhood friend Joe Jewell formed a precursor to Aslan, named Meelah XVIII. The band, named for Leon Uris's novel Mila 18, created a recording for The Dave Fanning Show on RTÉ Radio 2 in 1980. The Meelah XVIII songs "Toy Soldier" and "Meelah Pt. 2" were included on the Aslan triple CD, The "Rarities" disc from The Platinum Collection. The band later recruited Alan Downey and Billy McGuinness to form Aslan.

As Aslan singles "This Is", "Please Don't Stop", "Loving Me Lately", "Pretty Thing" and "Feel No Shame" and the album "Feel No Shame" became popular, the band's record label EMI funded the band's tour of America, but Dignam's relationship with his bandmates was becoming strained due to his problems with heroin addiction and this became a contributing factor to him leaving the band.

On 7 September 1988, The Star newspaper ran with the headline "ASLAN: IT'S THE END", informing the public of Dignam's separation from Aslan. The remaining members of the band continued as Aslan for some time with new lead singer Eamon Doyle, before the band changed its name to Precious Stones with vocalist Dave McGinly. Dignam went solo with guitarist Conor Goff, forming Dignam & Goff.

However, on 11 July 1993, Aslan reformed, for what was supposed to be a "once off gig" at a friend's party in Finglas. With a reignited spark and new material, Aslan continued to become one of Ireland's most successful bands. Their studio albums include Feel No Shame, Goodbye Charlie Moonhead, Here Comes Lucy Jones and Waiting for the Madness To End. They have had two "best of" albums: Shame About Lucy Moonhead and the triple album The Platinum Collection. They have also had a best-selling live album Made in Dublin and an official bootleg album (available at gigs) called Aslan Live at the Olympia, which featured appearances from Jerry Fish, Relish and Damien Rice.

In October 2021, his debut solo album The Man Who Stayed Alive was released by Sony Music Ireland and charted at number 7 on the Official Charts Company's Irish Albums Chart Top 50.

== Personal life ==
Dignam met his wife Kathryn at the age of 14, and the couple married in 1988. They were married for 37 years up until Dignam's death, and had a daughter. He wrote an autobiography (with Damian Corless), My Crazy World, published worldwide by Simon & Schuster in September 2019.

== Health ==
Dignam started using LSD and marijuana at 15, and heroin in his 20s. He developed an addiction to heroin which he battled for many years, and was arrested in a Garda raid during the late 1980s. His involvement with the drug caused conflicts which led to his eventual departure from Aslan. He entered multiple drug treatment programmes, including a stint in a rehab programme in a Buddhist monastery, Wat Tham Krabok, in Thailand in 2004. This was featured in the documentary Heroin: Facing The Dragon. He also suffered at times from a crack cocaine addiction.

Dignam recounted his story of drug addiction in his autobiography, This is Christy Dignam, co-written by journalist Neil Fetherstonhaugh and published by Merlin Publishing. One reviewer said it "should be required reading for anyone hovering on the edges of the drug culture."

=== Diagnoses ===
Dignam was initially admitted to hospital with a suspected chest infection; this progressed to pneumonia.

After numerous tests were carried out in March 2013, he was diagnosed with both amyloidosis, in which amyloid proteins build up in the body's organs, and myeloma, a cancer that attacks plasma cells in the bone marrow.

Upon returning to consciousness, Dignam spoke of having had a near-death experience that prompted doctors to inject him with two shots of adrenaline. Dignam said, "There was a blockage in my arm where the adrenaline was going in, so they had to slit the side of my neck, straight into the jugular and right down into my heart. I felt like I had died for a minute or so, nothing seemed to matter, then suddenly the adrenaline restarted my heart." He underwent chemotherapy for the condition, and as of September 2017, was continuing to receive chemotherapy.

From 2013, he was in receipt of treatment for amyloidosis however he continued to perform and make public appearances until his condition worsened.

On 16 January 2023, his family announced that Dignam was home since December 2022 and receiving palliative care.

=== Death ===
Dignam died at home on 13 June 2023, at the age of 63. Numerous public figures paid tribute to Dignam following his death, including President of Ireland Michael D. Higgins and U2 frontman Bono.
