= The Sunday Night Project =

British comedy-variety show

- Opening titles from 2008–2009
- Also known as: The Friday Night Project
- Presented by: Alan Carr (2006–2009); Justin Lee Collins (2006–2009); Jimmy Carr (2005); Sharon Horgan (2005); Lucy Montgomery (2005); Rob Rouse (2005)
- Opening theme: "Light in the Sky" by Steve Hillage
- Ending theme: House Performer
- Country of origin: United Kingdom
- No. of series: 8
- No. of episodes: 73

Production
- Executive producers: Sebastian Scott; Richard Ackerman
- Production location: The London Studios
- Running time: 65 minutes
- Production company: Princess Productions

Original release
- Network: Channel 4
- Release: 4 February 2005 – 8 February 2009

Related
- Alan Carr: Chatty Man; The Justin Lee Collins Show

The Sunday Night Project is a British comedy-variety show by Princess Productions that first aired on Channel 4 in February 2005 under the title The Friday Night Project. Originally broadcast on Friday nights, the show moved to Sunday nights for its seventh series in 2008.

Each week, the regular hosts (from series 2 onwards) Justin Lee Collins and Alan Carr are joined by a celebrity guest host. These guests provide an opening monologue, are interviewed by Alan and Justin and take questions from the studio audience. They also take part in comedy sketches, hidden camera stunts and a game show where someone from the audience is selected to win prizes.

When the show was called The Friday Night Project, it was not live: it was recorded at The London Studios on the night before broadcast on Channel 4. When the show became The Sunday Night Project, the Thursday-night taping schedule was retained.

== Episode list ==
=== Series 1 ===
Original regular hosts Lucy Montgomery, Jimmy Carr, Sharon Horgan and Rob Rouse

The Friday Night Project was originally presented by comics Jimmy Carr, Rob Rouse, Sharon Horgan and, as a roving reporter, Lucy Montgomery, with sporadic appearances from Abi Titmuss. The first series began on 4 February 2005 and ran for 8 weeks.

The guest hosts for the series were:

Episode number	Air date	Guest host	Musical guest (song performed)	Celebrity guest stars
Pilot	Filmed in 2004	Gordon Ramsay	Razorlight	
1	4 February 2005	Vinnie Jones	Fightstar (Palahniuk's Laughter)	Bez and Jeff Brazier
2	11 February 2005	Neil Morrissey	The Futureheads (Hounds of Love)	Richard Blackwood and Maureen Rees
3	18 February 2005	Kelly Osbourne	The Bravery (An Honest Mistake)	Christine Hamilton and Jean-Christophe Novelli
4	25 February 2005	Jordan	Kaiser Chiefs (Oh My God)	Romeo and Keith Harris
5	4 March 2005	Brigitte Nielsen	Moby (Lift Me Up)	John McCririck and Pat Sharp
6	11 March 2005	Eamonn Holmes	The Others (William)	Charles Ingram and Dick and Dom
7	18 March 2005	Boy George	Kinky Rowland & Boy George (Here Come The Girls)	Eddie 'the Eagle' Edwards and Bella Emberg
8	25 March 2005	Sadie Frost	The Thrills (The Irish Keep Gate-Crashing)	Abi Titmuss and Paul Rawson

=== Series 2 ===
The show returned on 6 January 2006 for 8 weeks with new hosts comedians Justin Lee Collins and Alan Carr (who worked together on late night show Flipside), with Debra Stephenson replacing Lucy Montgomery for the Celebrity Spotting segment. The episode featuring Billie Piper was awarded the 2006 Golden Rose of Montreux for best variety show.

The guest hosts for the series were:

Episode Number	Air Date	Guest Host	Musical Guest (Song performed)	Who knows the most about the guest host? panelists
1	6 January 2006	Billie Piper	Texas (Sleep)	Jade Goody and Kenzie
2	13 January 2006	Lorraine Kelly	Editors (Munich)	Myleene Klass and Phil Tufnell
3	20 January 2006	Christian Slater	The Kooks (You Don't Love Me)	Lady Isabella Hervey and Fearne Cotton
4	27 January 2006	Denise van Outen	Boy Kill Boy (Back Again)	Bez and Nadia Almada
5	3 February 2006	Michael Barrymore	The Ordinary Boys (Boys Will Be Boys)	Nancy Sorrell and Samia Smith
6	10 February 2006	Jamie Oliver	Kubb (Grow)	Tara Palmer-Tomkinson and Chantelle Houghton
7	17 February 2006	Jessie Wallace	Hard-Fi (Hard to Beat)	Caprice Bourret and Hilda Braid
8	24 February 2006	Trisha Goddard	The Automatic (Raoul)	Faria Alam and Pete Burns

=== Series 3 ===
The third series of the show ran from 16 June 2006 for 11 weeks, and one special, whilst Big Brother was shown during summer 2006. Justin Lee Collins and Alan Carr returned as hosts and the format is exactly the same as the second series. Paul O'Grady was due to host but had to pull out due to a heart attack one week before his episode was to start filming. Cilla Black was also due to host an episode, but had to pull out.

The guest hosts for the series were:

Episode Number	Air Date	Guest Host	Musical Guest (Song performed)	Who knows the most about the guest host? panelists
1	16 June 2006	Jerry Springer	Orson (Bright Idea)	Zöe Lucker and Sam Brodie
2	23 June 2006	Patsy Kensit	Placebo (Infra-Red)	Jeremy Edwards and Grace Adams-Short
3	30 June 2006	Rob Lowe	The Zutons (Valerie)	Jennifer Ellison and Kirsty Gallacher
4	7 July 2006	Mischa Barton	Dirty Pretty Things (Deadwood)	Camille Coduri and Harry Judd
5	14 July 2006	Ian Wright	Feeder (Just A Day)	Sally Lindsay and Lea Walker
6	21 July 2006	Jade Goody	Razorlight (In The Morning)	Dominic Wood and Nikki Grahame
7	28 July 2006	Justin Hawkins	Kasabian (Empire)	Holly Willoughby and Jayne Kitt
8	4 August 2006	Rupert Everett	Primal Scream (Dolls (Sweet Rock and Roll))	Jennie McAlpine and Sarah Beeny
9	11 August 2006	Carol Vorderman	The Automatic (Recover)	Gary Lucy and Susie Verrico
10	18 August 2006	Ross Kemp	The Feeling (Never Be Lonely)	Matt Willis and Chantelle Houghton
11	25 August 2006	Cheryl Cole, Kimberley Walsh and Sarah Harding	The Fratellis (Chelsea Dagger)	Aisleyne Horgan-Wallace and Glyn Wise

=== Series 4 ===
The fourth series of The Friday Night Project started on Channel 4 on 5 January 2007 and ran for 7 weeks, with hosts Justin Lee Collins and Alan Carr returning. The format was almost identical to the previous series, with the exception of 'Celebrity Spotting with Debra Stephenson', which was not featured. A new feature was that the coat of cash is sometimes worn by a celebrity guest, rather than Justin, Alan, the guest host or a panelist.

The guest hosts for the series were:

Episode Number	Air Date	Guest Host	Musical Guest (Song performed)	Who knows the most about the guest host? panelists	Coat Of Cash Wearing Celebrity
1	5 January 2007	David Tennant	Amy Winehouse (You Know I'm No Good)	Amy Winehouse and George Galloway	Lauren Harries
2	12 January 2007	Tamzin Outhwaite	Just Jack (Starz in Their Eyes)	Kate Thornton and Tito Jackson	Bradley McIntosh
3	19 January 2007	James Nesbitt	Mika (Grace Kelly)	Leo Sayer and Kirstie Allsopp	Shahbaz Chauhdry
4	26 January 2007	Noel Edmonds	Fall Out Boy (This Ain't a Scene, It's an Arms Race)	Kelly Osbourne and Jason Donovan	Jason Donovan
5	2 February 2007	Jamie Oliver	Klaxons (Golden Skans)	Jermaine Jackson and Nora Sands	Ian "H" Watkins
6	9 February 2007	Steven Seagal	Ghosts (Stay The Night)	Gemma Atkinson and Jamelia	Steven Seagal
7	16 February 2007	Ashley Jensen	The Gossip (Standing In The Way Of Control)	Duncan James and Kim Woodburn	Alan Carr

=== Series 5 ===
The fifth series began on 1 June 2007 and ran for 14 weeks, double that of the previous series. This was because the third series of The Charlotte Church Show was delayed, due to Church's pregnancy. In Series 5, 'The Friday Night News' was re-vamped and 'The Big Fun Gameshow' replaced 'Famous Five'. There were also questions on VT in the 'Ask Me Anything' segment from celebrity friends of the Guest Host. Comedian Ronnie Corbett and Actress Daryl Hannah were slated to host an episode, but both pulled out.

The guest hosts for the series were:

Episode Number	Air Date	Guest Host	Musical Guest (Song performed)	"Who knows the most about the guest host?" Panelists	"Coat of Cash" Wearing Celebrity
1	1 June 2007	David Walliams	Mutya Buena (Real Girl)	Anthony Head and Kathleen Williams	Pete Bennett
2	8 June 2007	Chris Moyles	The Twang (Either Way)	Jo Whiley and Edith Bowman	Aled Haydn Jones
3	15 June 2007	Sharon Osbourne	Calvin Harris (The Girls)	Louis Walsh and Ozzy Osbourne	Ben James-Ellis
4	22 June 2007	Melanie C	The Enemy (Had Enough)	Richard E Grant and Katie Hopkins	Shabnam Paryani
5	29 June 2007	Lily Allen	Mark Ronson and Lily Allen (Oh My God)	Alex James and Myleene Klass	Seány O'Kane
6	6 July 2007	Paula Abdul	Avril Lavigne (Hot)	Jason Gardiner and Arlene Phillips	Billi Bhatti
7	13 July 2007	Beth Ditto	Kate Nash (Foundations)	Wendi Peters and Thaila Zucchi	Laura Williams
8	20 July 2007	Rupert Everett	Manic Street Preachers (Autumnsong)	Les Dennis and Kate Ritchie	Les Dennis
9	27 July 2007	John Barrowman	The Coral (Who's Gonna Find Me)	Andi Peters and Zoe Tyler	Nicky Maxwell
10	3 August 2007	Joanna Lumley	Amy Macdonald (Mr Rock & Roll)	Nigel Havers and Charley Uchea	Charley Uchea
11	10 August 2007	David Gest	Hard-Fi (Suburban Knights)	Tito Jackson and Matt Willis	Shanessa Reilly
12	17 August 2007	Kanye West	Kanye West (Stronger)	Tim Westwood and Jamelia	Amy Alexandra
13	24 August 2007	Kim Cattrall	Rihanna (Shut Up and Drive)	Shaggy and Gok Wan	Gerry Stergiopoulos
14	31 August 2007	Cilla Black	Reverend and the Makers (He Said He Loved Me)	Jenni Falconer Marcus Harrison and Bruno Tonioli	Kara-Louise Horne and Tracey Barnard

=== Series 6 ===
Series 6 of The Friday Night Project began on 21 March 2008 and ran for six weeks.

The guest hosts for the series were:

Episode Number	Air Date	Guest Host	Musical Guest (Song performed)	"Who knows the most about the guest host?" Panelists	Coat Of Cash Wearing Celebrity
1	21 March 2008	Elle Macpherson	Estelle (American Boy)	Jason Donovan and Alesha Dixon	Rhino
2	28 March 2008	David Tennant	The Wombats (Backfire at the Disco)	Suzanne Shaw and Freema Agyeman	Nicholas de Lacy-Brown
3	4 April 2008	Mariah Carey	Mariah Carey (Touch My Body)	Matt Di Angelo and Antony Cotton	Matt Di Angelo
4	11 April 2008	Elijah Wood	Heloise and the Savoir Faire (Illusions)	Reggie Yates and Kelly Osbourne	Ian Stringer
5	18 April 2008	Geri Halliwell	Sam Sparro (Black and Gold)	Joe Dempsie and Shaggy	Caroline Pearce
6	25 April 2008	Gok Wan	One Night Only (It's About Time)	Joanna Page and Konnie Huq	Lindi Mngaza

The show then took a 1½ month break and returned on 8 June 2008 to film a 7-part series. The show moved to Sundays and became known as The Sunday Night Project. Naomi Campbell was originally slated to host an episode this series but had to pull out.

=== Series 7 ===
The guest hosts for the series were:

Episode Number	Air Date	Guest Host	Musical Guest (Song performed)	"Who knows the most about the guest host?" Panelists	Coat of Cash Wearing Celebrity
1	8 June 2008	Katie Price and Peter Andre	The Courteeners (No You Didn't, No You Don't)	Cerys Matthews and Michelle Dewberry	Andy Abraham
2	15 June 2008	Pamela Anderson	Five O'Clock Heroes feat. Agyness Deyn (Who)	Paul Daniels and Danny Dyer	Ricky Whittle
3	22 June 2008	Mark Ronson	N.E.R.D. (Everyone Nose)	Pharrell Williams and Miquita Oliver	Stephanie McMichael
4	29 June 2008	Ronan Keating, Stephen Gately, and Shane Lynch	Estelle (No Substitute Love)	Lulu and Estelle	Carly Stratton
5	6 July 2008	David Hasselhoff	The Feeling (Turn It Up)	Scott Mills and Sally Lindsay	Sylvia Barrie
6	13 July 2008	Barbara Windsor	The Ting Tings (Shut Up and Let Me Go)	Patsy Palmer and Anna Karen	Jennifer Clark
7	20 July 2008	Will Young	Scouting for Girls (It's Not About You)	Suranne Jones and Jane McDonald	Mario Marconi

=== Series 8 ===
Series 8 began on 14 December 2008. The series consisted of 8 episodes. This series saw the introduction of a segment called SNP Local News which, like the Sunday Night News, took a satirical look at the week's news headlines from the home town of that week's guest host. Also, The Big Fun Gameshow was axed for this series, with Who Knows The Most About The Guest Host and My Question Time moved to the final segment of the show. Razorlight were scheduled to be the musical guests for episode 4 but they pulled out at the last minute.

The guest hosts for the series were:

Episode Number	Air Date	Guest Host	Musical Guest (Song performed)	"Who knows the most about the guest host?" Panelists	Coat Of Cash Wearing Celebrity
1	14 December 2008	Tom Jones	none	David Van Day & Gethin Jones	Timmy Mallett
2	21 December 2008	Simon Pegg	Kaiser Chiefs (Never Miss a Beat)	Katie Pegg and Gill Pegg	There was no coat of cash. Money was thrown by Alan Carr, Justin Lee Collins and Simon Pegg
3	4 January 2009	Kirstie Allsopp and Phil Spencer	Glasvegas (Flowers & Football Tops)	Dani Behr and Jack Whitehall	Rachel Rice
4	11 January 2009	James Corden	VV Brown (Crying Blood)	Rachel Stevens and Joe Swash	Steffan Rhodri
5	18 January 2009	Catherine Tate	Lady Gaga (Just Dance)	Bernard Cribbins and Lacey Turner	Barri Griffiths
6	25 January 2009	Anne Robinson	Snow Patrol (Crack the Shutters)	Tina Malone and Michelle Heaton	Anthony Quinlan
7	1 February 2009	Martin Sheen	Daniel Merriweather (Change)	Catherine Tate and Mark Ronson	Terry Christian
8	8 February 2009	Lily Allen	Lily Allen (The Fear)	Coolio and Harry Enfield	Coolio

=== Cancellation ===
Carr said on This Morning on 25 June that the show would at least return at the end of the year for Christmas specials. However, Carr later confirmed that the Christmas specials had been scrapped as well and he would not be returning to the show. A new DVD named The Sunday Late Night Project was released 16 November. It was stated by Justin Lee Collins and Alan Carr that they would not be returning for any new series and new hosts would take over. Beginning in March 2009, The Justin Lee Collins Show aired Thursday nights on ITV2. After Collins's solo series ended, Alan Carr: Chatty Man began airing on Channel 4 in June 2009, during The Sunday Night Project's original timeslot.

== Specials ==
The Friday Night Christmas Project 2006 on 24 December 2006 showed highlights from both of the 2006 series. Two specials aired in December 2007. They took the format of normal shows each with their own different Guest Host. On 5 June 2008, a special Big Brother episode aired to coincide with the launch of the new series.

Episode Number	Air Date	Guest Host	Musical Guest/Song performed	Who knows the most about the guest host? panelists	Coat Of Cash Wearing Celebrity
The Friday Night Christmas Project 2006	24 December 2006	Various	None	Various	None
The Friday Night Christmas Project 2007	21 December 2007	Girls Aloud (Cheryl Cole, Nadine Coyle, Sarah Harding, Nicola Roberts and Kimberley Walsh)	Girls Aloud (Santa Claus is Coming to Town & Can't Speak French)	Alex Zane and Christopher Biggins	There was no coat of cash. Money was thrown by Alan Carr, Justin Lee Collins, Alex Zane, Christopher Biggins and Girls Aloud
The Friday Night New Year Project 2007	28 December 2007	Davina McCall	Stereophonics (My Friends)	Chris Moyles and Fearne Cotton	Brian Belo
The Big Brother Launch Night Project	5 June 2008	Aisleyne Horgan-Wallace, Nikki Grahame, Pete Bennett, Charley Uchea, Lea Walker, Chanelle Hayes, Ziggy Lichman, Brian Belo, Nadia Almada, Carole Vincent, Brian Dowling, Kinga Karolczak, Glyn Wise	Mystery Jets (Two Doors Down)	George Lamb and Zezi Ifore	Anthony Hutton

== Big Brother ==
When the show returned in 2006 with Alan and Justin, the show was repackaged around Big Brother. The two series were scheduled at the same time as both Celebrity Big Brother and Big Brother. During the summer series, there would be several mentions of the show. The guest hosts would always mention in their monologue which housemate got evicted that night. During the Friday Night News, there would often be a taped segment (from Alan's supposed housemaid "Juanita") where Justin, Alan and the guest host would dress up as the housemates, making fun of them. Finally, the previous week's evicted housemate would always show up during the "Who Knows the Most about the Guest Host" segment as a contestant or to wear "The Coat of Cash".

== Features ==
=== Opening monologue ===
The guest host of the show appears after being announced by Justin Lee Collins in the title sequence, after applause, the guest host makes jokes about the funnier side of the weeks news, things frequently mentioned are celebrity mishaps and Big Brother, while funny pictures are often shown as well. After a few jokes, the week's musical guest is introduced by the guest host. The musical guest is usually an up-and-coming band, though established bands have appeared on a few occasions. After the introduction of the musical guest, the guest host sits down and talks with Justin and Alan, often about themselves, before they talk about how they met up and did something together in the previous week.

=== Bonding ===
A clip is displayed of Alan and Justin's visit to meet the guest host earlier in the week. Justin and Alan usually greet the celebrity, before they take part in an activity. The activities are very different each week, ranging from cruising in Hampstead Heath with Rupert Everett (Series 3, Episode 8), to recording a song with Girls Aloud (Series 3, Episode 11). At the end of the meet, Justin and Alan fantasize about something, usually related to the guest host.

=== Dream Sequence Sketch ===
Justin, Alan and the guest host participate in a sketch of some sort, usually related to something that the guest host is famous for, sketches have ranged from Alan and Justin being TV detectives (Series 4, Episode 3), Alan and Justin having their own television shows called the AC and the JLC (Series 3, Episode 4) and Alan and Justin running a hotel Fawlty Towers style (Series 4, Episode 2). Alan often has a complaint about how the sketch has been carried out, while Justin often gets the leading role. After the sketch, the action returns to the studio, where the guest host calls a commercial break.

=== "The Friday/Sunday Night News" ===
Alan Carr and Mischa Barton during the Friday Night News segment of the show.

After the break, Justin announces that they will be going over to Alan and the guest host for The (Friday) Sunday Night News. Some news stories of the week are read out, which Alan comments on in a humorous way (such as Hug-A-Hoodie, where Alan commented that he would like to hug the hoodie, except that he cannot move as the hoodie has just beaten him up). After the news has been read, Alan makes a penis reference, which the guest host often takes the wrong way, before chastising the guest host for being dirty and bringing out his topical barometer. Alan identifies "what's hot and what's not", making comments on each item. In Series 3 Episode 11, Alan used Sarah Harding as the barometer. On some occasions, there is a spoof sketch of recent events, usually Big Brother. After this, the action returns to the sofa and into the next section.

=== "SNP Local News" ===
New for series 8, SNP Local News took a satirical look at the week's news from wherever the guest host was from.

=== "Who Knows The Most About The Guest Host?" ===
In this section, the guest host will host a quiz where all of the questions are about them. There are two teams, with Alan and a celebrity making up one team, and Justin and another celebrity making up the other. The celebrities are often Big Brother contestants, soap actors, 'it-celebrities' or someone who has a personal or professional link to the guest host. In the first round, questions are asked by the host and one of the players has to buzz in and answer correctly. The second round was different each week, and often saw the two teams competing against each other in a ludicrous activity, such as miming sex positions (Series 4, Episode 1) and doing Shrek Impressions (Series 3, Episode 8). In later series, Round 2 involves the Word Association Round in which contestants must give a word that directly relates to the Guest Host. If an unrelated or repeated word is given or a contestant hesitates to answer, they are promptly given an electric shock via panels which they must place their hands on, connected by a control box held by the Guest Host. The last contestant standing wins the point for their team. The team with the most points wins the game. Previously, the winner of the quiz, either Justin or Alan, would run into the audience wearing "The Coat Of Cash", a coat covered in five pound notes (or sometimes the currency of the guest host's home country). However, in recent series, a guest celebrity has worn the coat. Members of the audience are free to grab the celebrity to get the money, with the guest host often looking on, horrified. After this section, another break is called. From series 8, this segment becomes the climax of the show.

=== "Watch Out, (Guest Host)'s About" ===
After the break, the guest host talks to Justin and Alan on the sofa, before showing video footage of them playing a prank on an unsuspecting member of the public, similar to Beadle's About. These pranks have ranged from a man unveiling a bust of Ian Wright only to break it, and Mischa Barton asking a man to break into her car to get her dog out, only for the car's real owner to come along. Celebrity Spotting sometimes replaces this. A segment of Smile Like You Mean It by The Killers plays during the opening of this segment.

=== "My Question Time" ===
- When more than one host, it is called Our Question Time
- Previously called Ask me Anything

In this section, members of the audience are invited to ask the guest host some questions. These questions range from simple things about the guest hosts career, to cruder questions about topics such as the host's sex life, or if they have a criminal record etc. Justin sits with the guest host choosing people from the audience to ask questions while Alan goes into the audience with a microphone, often making sarcastic/derogatory comments about - or even flirting with - various audience members or complaining about the distance he must go to reach the person chosen.

Since series 8, this has been extended by several minutes and is the last segment of the show, after which the guest host thanks Justin and Alan, any celebrity guests and the audience before introducing that night's musical guest.

=== Live musical performance ===
The week's musical guest performs a song, generally their latest single, towards the end of the song, Justin, Alan and the guests can be seen dancing, while the credits roll.

=== "The Abi Titmuss Mystery Sex Tape Test" ===
In series 1, every week model Abi Titmuss, who famously had a sex tape in 2004, would appear in a sex tape scenario, e.g. in a hotel room, with a mystery celebrity. Glimpses of the celebrity secret lover would appear, and viewers texted to guess his or her identity, from three name options, to win £1,000.

=== "Famous Five" ===
In this section, the guest host tried to win up to five prizes for a member of the audience, five different styles of questions were answered, with the first four often being things such as answering a question set by Stephen Hawking, guessing who Alan is imitating and naming a certain number of things in a time limit. The fifth question is then a take on a popular game or gameshow, with games like Dysfunctional Family Fortunes (Family Fortunes), The Jerryation Game (The Generation Game), Bitchbusters (Blockbusters), Sveniata (Pinata), The Dartness (Bullseye) and C**tdown (Countdown), after this, everyone celebrates (if the big prize was won), or is downhearted (if the big prize wasn't won), the celebrity then says thanks to the audience, Justin, Alan and all the guests, before introducing the musical guest and the song that they will be singing.

=== "Celebrity Spotting With ..." ===
In series 1, Lucy Montgomery toured the streets where the guest host grew up trying to find celebrity lookalikes. For series 2-3 she was replaced by Debra Stephenson who toured the streets of Manchester, again looking for celebrity lookalikes, sometimes Debra would ask questions or ask the person to do something as if they were the celebrity they looked like. This segment of the show has also been done by Chantelle Houghton and Nikki Grahame when Debra was unavailable.

In the fifth series, Celebrity Spotting made a comeback, with Chris Moyles taking to the streets to find more lookalikes. This was in place of the usual "Watch out (Guest Host's) about". This segment returned briefly in Series 5 during the Chris Moyles, Beth Ditto and Rupert Everett episodes.

=== Bingo ===
Series 1 saw a game of bingo played midway through the show specifically designed around the guest host. An example of this includes in Episode 1 where a game of 'Hard Man Bingo' was played as Vinnie Jones was the guest host. Jimmy Carr and the guest host would stand around the bingo machine whilst the guest host would take out a ball with a message or catchphrase on it, as opposed to the traditional numbers. Rob Rouse would act as the bingo caller and add a humorous comment to go with the catchphrase on the ball. The entire audience would have their own bingo card and would cross off the phrase once it was called out. The winner would be the first person to have a completed bingo card and would receive a nice prize. In the event of multiple people completing the card at the same time a near impossible to get spot on tie-break question was asked, regarding the guest host's career or personality. This item was scrapped for Series 2 and hasn't returned since.

=== "Rob's Magic Moments" ===
Again a feature only appearing during the first series. This involved a pre-recorded outside broadcast in public places (such as a shopping centre or high street) in which Rob Rouse would aim to bring cheer into the unsuspecting public. This usually meant they were led into a false sense of insecurity only for Rob to appear and sing accompanied by several backing singers.

=== Ask Me Anything ===
In this section, members of the audience are invited to ask the guest host some questions. These questions range from simple things about the guest host's career, to cruder questions about topics such as the host's sex life, whether they have committed a crime etc. From Series 5 there were also questions on VT from celebrity friends of the guest host and from special guests in the audience. Another break is called, whilst the guest host goes into the audience to select someone to participate in the next section. This morphed into My Question Time after the removal of the next segment and leading directly into the musical guest performance.

=== "The Big Fun Gameshow" ===
As of Series 5, the fourth part of the programme was "The Big Fun Gameshow", a game show style section in a bright buzzing set. Justin acted as the host and the Guest Host played with the audience member for prizes. There were six prizes on offer and these were selected from a huge spinning wheel on the floor - with the audience member acting as the pointer (complete with costume). He or she were spun on the wheel until a prize was selected. Different games that relate to the Guest Host were played to win those prizes. After playing four games the contestant had the option of taking the prizes they have won or gamble them by answering one 'A or B' question about the Guest Host. If they answered correctly, they won all four prizes and a holiday,"Good Times", or they went home with nothing,"Bad Times". Following this, the host thanked everyone on the show and introduced the band who play their song. Through this segment's run all contestants chose to gamble and none lost. "The Big Fun Gameshow" was cut from series 8, instead being replaced with an extended My Question Time followed by the Band performance.

== Best of the Projects ==
Beginning on 3 May 2009, Alan and Justin presented a 10-part series containing the best clips from The Friday Night Project and The Sunday Night Project featuring guests hosts and shown on E4 in Best of the Projects.
