= Nickelodeon UK Kids' Choice Awards 2007 =

British entertainment awards ceremony

20th Kids' Choice Awards
- Date: 20 October 2007
- Location: ExCeL Exhibition Centre
- Hosted by: McFly

Television/radio coverage
- Network: Nickelodeon

The Nickelodeon UK Kids' Choice Awards was first announced in May 2007. It is the first ever Kids' Choice Awards for the UK Nickelodeon. The show was hosted at ExCeL Exhibition Centre, London which took place 20 October 2007 and was presented by pop band McFly.

The Nickelodeon UK Kids' Choice Awards is very similar to the Australian and American versions, kids get to vote by clicking on the Nickelodeon website. Whoever voted on the website had a chance to get tickets to attend the ceremony in London. Also, another competition was held about "Nickelodeon's Big Green Thing"; people who went online and did what the commercial told them to do could also win a family ticket for 4 to the ceremony.

== Guests ==
- Josh Peck
- John Cena
- David Walliams
- Brian Belo
- Chanelle Hayes
- Ziggy Lichman
- Matt Willis
- Amanda Marchant
- Samantha Marchant
- Devon Werkheiser

== Nominees ==
=== Best TV Actress ===
- Ashley Tisdale - Winner
- Emma Roberts
- Jamie Lynn Spears
- Miley Cyrus

=== Best Female Singer ===
- Avril Lavigne
- Cheryl Cole
- Hilary Duff - Winner
- Gwen Stefani

=== Best Reality Show ===
- The X Factor - Winner
- Big Brother
- Britain's Got Talent
- I'm a Celebrity... Get Me Out of Here!

=== Best Book ===
- Harry Potter and the Deathly Hallows – J. K. Rowling - Winner
- Care and the Feeding of Sprites (Spiderwick Chronicles) – Holly Black
- Blood Beast (The Demonata) – Darren Shan
- Jacky Daydream – Jacqueline Wilson

=== Best Movie Actress ===
- Cameron Diaz
- Dakota Fanning
- Emma Watson - Winner
- Keira Knightley

=== Funniest Person ===
- Jack Black - Winner
- Rowan Atkinson
- Catherine Tate
- Harry Hill

=== Best Sportsperson ===
- David Beckham
- John Cena - Winner
- Kelly Holmes
- Lewis Hamilton

(Even though after they announced Beckham as the winner, John Cena would not accept it and McFly awarded him the 'Most Injured Wrestler' award).

=== Best Movie Actor ===
- Johnny Depp - (Pirates of the Caribbean: At World's End) - Winner
- Daniel Radcliffe - (Harry Potter & the Order of the Phoenix)
- Orlando Bloom - (Pirates of the Caribbean: At World's End)
- Rowan Atkinson - (Mr. Bean's Holiday)

=== Best Male Singer ===
- Drake Bell - Winner
- Danny Jones
- Justin Timberlake
- Mika

=== Best TV Actor ===
- Zac Efron - Winner
- David Tennant
- Drake Bell
- Nat Wolff

=== Best TV Presenter ===
- Davina McCall
- Fearne Cotton
- Ugly Mark
- Ant and Dec - Winner

=== Best TV Show ===
- Doctor Who
- Drake & Josh - Winner
- H_{2}O: Just Add Water
- Hannah Montana

=== Best Cartoon ===
- The Fairly OddParents
- Recess
- The Simpsons
- SpongeBob SquarePants - Winner

=== Best Band ===
- Fall Out Boy
- Girls Aloud
- McFly - Winner (Hosts)
- Sugababes

=== MTV Hits Best Music Video ===
- "Cupid's Chokehold" by Gym Class Heroes
- "Girlfriend" by Avril Lavigne - Winner
- "Grace Kelly" by Mika
- "Listen" by Beyoncé
- "Ruby" by Kaiser Chiefs
- "Same Jeans" by The View
- "The Sweet Escape" by Gwen Stefani featuring Akon
- "Too Little Too Late" by Jojo
- "Umbrella" by Rihanna
- "What Goes Around... Comes Around" by Justin Timberlake

=== Best Video Game ===
- The Sims 2 - Winner
- FIFA 07
- Mario Strikers Charged Football
- Wii Sports

=== Best Movie of the Year ===
- Harry Potter and the Order of the Phoenix
- Pirates of the Caribbean: At World's End
- Shrek the Third
- The Simpsons Movie - Winner
