= Chanelle =

Chanelle is a feminine given name. It is a variant of the given name Chanel, which itself originated from the surname of Coco Chanel. It was among the most popular 1,000 names for newborn girls in the United States from 1987 to 1992, with a peak rank of 879th in 1991. People with this name include:

- Chanelle Charron-Watson (born 1984), Canadian swimmer
- Chanelle Hayes (born 1987), English television personality
- Chanelle Haynes (born 1978), singer and actress, formerly of gospel music group Trin-i-tee 5:7
- Chanelle Price (born 1990), American middle-distance runner
- Chanelle Scheepers (born 1984), South African tennis player
- Chanelle Sladics (born 1984), American snowboarder

== See also ==
- Chanel (disambiguation)
- Shanelle, given name
- Chanelle: Wannabe Popstar, 2008 British reality show
- Savannah–Chanelle Vineyards, vineyard located in the eastern foothills of the Santa Cruz mountains above Saratoga, California
- Chanelle, American singer born Charlene Mumford
