= Shanelle =

Shanelle is a female given name. Notable people with the name include:

- Shanelle Arjoon (born 1997), Trinidadian footballer
- Shanelle Jackson (born 1980), American politician
- Shanelle Nyasiase (born 1997), Ethiopian-born South Sudanese fashion model.
- Shanelle Porter (born 1972), American sprinter who specialized in the 400 metres
- Shanelle Workman (born 1978), American actress, voice actress, producer and director

== See also ==
- Shanell (born 1980), American musician
- Chanelle, given name
- Shonelle Jackson, American murderer
