= Northern Line (group) =

UK musical group

- Origin: United Kingdom
- Genres: Pop
- Years active: 1998–2000
- Label: Global Talent Ltd.
- Past members: Lee Baldry; Toby Campion; Dan Corsi; Spike Grimsey; Ziggy Lichman; Andy Love; Ian Mason; Warren Morris; Michael Sharpe

Northern Line were a British-based boy band, consisting originally of Lee Baldry, Dan Corsi, Andy Love, Ian Mason and Michael Sharpe with the later additions of Ziggy Lichman and Warren Morris in the line-up changes.

== History ==
The all-male vocal group were signed with Global Talent (Records) Ltd. and released three singles charting in the UK Singles Chart; "Run for Your Life" (#18 in October 1999), "Love on the Northern Line" (#15 in March 2000) and "All Around the World" (#27 in June 2000). Northern Line toured England with Steps in 2000, during Steps' 'Steptacular' tour.

They were managed by David Forecast for ABC Management in London.

== Members ==
Member	1998	1999	2000
Dan Corsi (1998–2000)			
Andy Love (1998–2000)			
Michael Sharpe (1998–2000)			
Lee Baldry (1998)			
Ian Mason (1998)			
Toby Campion (1998-1999)			
Ziggy Lichman (1998–2000)			
Warren Morris (1998–2000)			
Spike Grimsey (1998)			

== Singles discography ==
Release date	Song	UK Singles Chart
27 September 1999	"Run for Your Life"	#18
28 February 2000	"Love on the Northern Line"	#15
5 June 2000	"All Around the World"	#27
