= The World Is Outside =

Studio album by Ghosts
- Released: 11 June 2007 (UK)
- Genre: Indie pop, post-Britpop
- Length: 48:31
- Label: Atlantic
- Producer: Danton Supple

Professional ratings
Review scores
Source	Rating
AllMusic	3/5 stars
The Guardian	2/5 stars
Playlouder	4/5 stars
This Is Fake DIY	3/5 stars

The World Is Outside is the debut album by English band Ghosts, released in 2007.

== Track listing ==
1. "Stay the Night" – 3:42
2. "Musical Chairs" – 3:41
3. "The World Is Outside" – 3:35
4. "Ghosts" – 3:51
5. "Mind Games" – 3:29
6. "Something Hilarious" – 5:14
7. "Stop" – 4:05
8. "Over-Analysis" – 4:17
9. "Further and Further Away" – 4:07
10. "Wrapped Up in Little Stars" – 5:53
11. "Temporary" – 6:44
