= Wannabe (TV series) =

- Starring: Chanelle Hayes; Roseann McBride; Toby Anstis; David Laudat; Kenny Ho
- Country of origin: United Kingdom
- No. of series: 2
- No. of episodes: 14

Production
- Running time: 30 minutes

Original release
- Network: VH1
- Release: 23 November 2007 – present

Wannabe is a British reality and talent show with Toby Anstis and ex-Big Brother housemate Chanelle Hayes, David Laudat and Roseanne McBride. It is a search for a new girl group similar to the Spice Girls consisting of five women over 25 years old.

The Spice Girls's attorneys found out about the show and had conversations with the show's representatives. Originally called Wannabe: Spice Girls, the show was renamed to Wannabe to prevent a protracted legal dispute with the girl group.

== Broadcasts ==
It aired on VH1 and TMF in the United Kingdom.

== Format ==
The first episode showed auditions all over Britain. On the judging panel are music industry impresario Roseann McBride, who has worked with artists such as N'Sync and Britney Spears; Chanelle Hayes, celebrity vocal coach David Laudat, radio presenter Daryl Denham; and Spice Girls stylist Kenny Ho. Toby Anstis was also a guest judge during the London auditions and Daryl Dennen in Liverpool.

The show had six episodes, the first airing on 23 November 2007.

== Finalists ==
- Pollyanna Woodward
- Lisa
- Celena Amiria
- Sabrina
- Beverley
- Fiona

Three out of these girls made it to the final three, group LadyA: Sabrina, Beverly and Lisa.

== See also ==
- Chanelle: Wannabe Popstar (TV series)
