= I Want It =

Single by Chanelle Hayes

from the album Chanelle
- Released: 12 May 2008
- Recorded: 2008
- Length: 3:09
- Label: Eminence Records
- Songwriter(s): Ben Ofoedu, Jack Lucien
- Producer(s): Ben Ofoedu

"I Want It" is the debut single released by Chanelle Hayes. Her progress during the making of the song was filmed as the reality TV show Chanelle: Wannabe Popstar shown on the VH1 and TMF TV channels. The official remix video included on the single is the "7th Heaven Radio Mix" by Ministry of Sound. The single was released as both a physical CD and download version on Monday 12 May 2008 and entered the UK Singles Chart on 18 May 2008.

== Track listing ==
1. "I Want It" (original mix)
2. "I Want It" (7th Heaven radio mix)
3. "I Want It" (7th Heaven club mix)
4. "I Want It" (enhanced video) (7th Heaven radio mix)

== Charts ==
| Chart (2008) | Peak Position |
|---|---|
| UK Singles (OCC) | 63 |
| UK Physical Singles (OCC) | 17 |
