= Stan Bowles (song) =

Single by The Others

from the album The Others
- Released: 18 October 2004
- Recorded: 2004
- Genre: Indie rock
- Label: Mercury Records

The Others singles chronology
"This Is For The Poor" (2004)	"Stan Bowles" (2004)	"Lackey" (2005)

"Stan Bowles" is a song by English indie rock band The Others and is featured on their debut album, The Others. Released on 18 October 2004, it was the second single from the album and charted at number 36 on the UK Singles Chart. The lyrics concern footballer Stan Bowles. who was renowned for his skill on the pitch as well as his flamboyant lifestyle off it. The song reflects on Bowles' career and personality, capturing the admiration and controversy that surrounded him. Bowles played for several clubs, most notably Queens Park Rangers, and became a cult figure in English football during the 1970s.

== Track listing ==
1. "Stan Bowles"
2. "Boy Is a Girl"
3. "This Is for the Poor" (Original Demo)
