= This Is for the Poor =

Single by The Others

from the album The Others
- Released: 17 May 2004
- Recorded: 2004
- Genre: Indie rock
- Label: Mercury Records

The Others singles chronology
"This Is for the Poor" (2004)	"Stan Bowles" (2004)

"This Is for the Poor" is a song by English indie rock band, The Others, and is featured on their debut album, The Others. Released on 17 May 2004, it was the first single from the album and charted at #42.

== Track listing ==
1. "This Is for the Poor"
2. "How I Nearly Lost You"
3. "Almanac"
