= Lackey (song) =

2005 single by the Others

Single by The Others

from the album The Others
- Released: 17 January 2005
- Recorded: 2004
- Genre: Indie rock
- Label: Mercury Records

The Others singles chronology
"Stan Bowles" (2004)	"Lackey" (2005)	"William" (2005)

"Lackey" is a song by English indie rock band The Others and is featured on their debut album, The Others. Released on 17 January 2005, it was the third single from the album.

== Track listing ==
1. "Lackey"
2. "King Prawn"

== Charts ==
Chart (2005)	Peak position
UK Singles (OCC)	21
