= Ghosts (band) =

English pop band

- Origin: Cranleigh, Surrey, England
- Genres: Indie pop, post-Britpop
- Years active: 2006–2012
- Labels: Atlantic Records
- Past members: Simon Pettigrew; Jonny Harris; Robbie Smith; Mark Treasure

Ghosts were an English indie pop band, formed in Cranleigh in 2006. The band comprised singer-songwriter/guitarist Simon Pettigrew, drummer Jonny Harris, bassist Robbie Smith and keyboard player Mark Treasure.

A legal tussle with their label Atlantic Records resulted in the band being unable to record for two years. Despite plans for members Pettigrew, Harris and Smith to reform in 2011, it was confirmed in 2012 that the band had split up.

== History ==
Pettigrew, Harris and Treasure met at school in Cranleigh and played together in bands for a decade before forming Ghosts. The trio first played together in 1995 as Prodigal Sun, a band they would later describe as being terrible, who played Britpop covers and were once booed off stage, and Polanski, an electronica influenced act with frontman Andy Zuk and bassist Robbie Smith. Polanski were played on BBC Radio 1 and attracted nearly 100 A&R scouts to one gig in 2003, but failed to secure a record deal. After Zuk left, Hong Kong born Pettigrew began writing songs on guitar and singing and essentially took over the band before the band re-located to Sweden for two months to write.

The band signed to Atlantic Records in November 2006 and released their debut single "Musical Chairs" in January 2007 as a limited edition 7". The band's next (and first proper) single "Stay the Night" began gaining heavy national radio airplay in the same month on the Dermot O'Leary show on BBC Radio 2 before being released in March 2007. The band made their first television appearance on The Friday Night Project on 9 February 2007.

The band released their debut album The World Is Outside in June 2007 and toured the album, including a slot as the 4th act on the main stage of London's Hyde Park Calling Festival, to be followed by The Feeling, Crowded House and Peter Gabriel and support to Keane at O2 Arena in London on their last UK date of their Under the Iron Sea Tour.

On 23 April 2008, Pettigrew announced that the band had returned to Sweden, to the island of Marstrand to write for their second album. However, in 2011 Pettigrew stated that when trying to write new material, that "it was never quite right... I'd even lost the child-like joy of going to see a band and getting carried away" and revealed that the band were slowed down by legal tussles with their label and effectively split up after losing momentum. The band tried writing for other artists and auditioning for a new singer, but nothing worked out. However, on a trip to Singapore in January 2011 to see his younger brother, actor and television presenter Oli Pettigrew, was encouraged to get on stage at the city's TAB venue to play his first gig since 2007, which resulted in five-night residency at the venue. Despite publishing two new songs on their MySpace page in February 2011 and Pettigrew stating the band (minus keyboard player Mark Treasure) felt they had "got a fresh purpose" and were writing new material again, he announced the band's split in May 2012.

== Band members ==
- Simon Pettigrew – vocals/guitar
- Jonny Harris – drums
- Robbie Smith – bass
- Mark Treasure – keyboard

== Discography ==
=== Albums ===
- 2007 – The World Is Outside No. 18 (11 June 2007)

=== Singles ===
- 2007 – "Musical Chairs" / "Departure Lounge" (January 2007)
- 2007 – "Stay the Night" UK No. 25 (March 2007)
- 2007 – "The World Is Outside" UK No. 35 (June 2007)
- 2007 – "Ghosts" (13 August 2007)

=== Downloads ===
- 2006 – Tales from Studio Six
- 2007 – "Stay the Night (Sun Session Version)"/"Don't Cha"
- 2007 – Ghosts: AOL Sessions – EP
- 2007 – iTunes Festival: London (20 August 2008)
