= Chanelle: Wannabe Popstar =

- Starring: Chanelle Hayes
- Country of origin: United Kingdom
- No. of series: 1
- No. of episodes: 6

Production
- Running time: 30 minutes (with advertisements)

Original release
- Network: VH1
- Release: 18 April – 23 May 2008

Chanelle: Wannabe Popstar is a British reality show following former Big Brother contestant Chanelle Hayes as she attempts to become a singer and performer. The episodes follow her as she learns how to dance and improve her singing voice, hoping eventually to sign with a record company, record a song and release a video in the charts.

== Broadcasts ==
The show aired on VH1 in the United Kingdom, on Fridays at 9.30 pm. The show was repeated on TMF (Freeview) on Sundays at 5.00 pm, and on TMF, VH1 and MTV One in subsequent weeks.

== Format ==
=== Episode 1 ===
Following on from the VH1 show Wannabe, the first episode shows Hayes's home life in Wakefield and her life before Big Brother, including footage of Hayes as a child and interviews with her about her insecurities and concerns.

=== Episode 2 ===
Hayes discusses songwriting with Ben Ofoedu from Phats & Small. Vocal Coach David Laudat helps build her confidence and gives her technical advice with breathing and concentration. Hayes then falls ill, delaying recording of the song and causing irritation for her managers from Eminence Records, though she is able to get to the recording studio by the end of the episode.

=== Episode 3 ===
Choreographer K-Knight trains Hayes for the dance routine for the music video for her song "I Want It". She has to choose the dancers that will perform alongside her in the video, and also faces up to her doubts about her own dancing skills. Hayes is also seen house-hunting in outer London. She then chooses outfits for the video with the help of her stylist, visiting her home wardrobe and Divas Corsets to find an appropriate outfit. The episode ends with Hayes voicing doubts to her agent about the idea of shooting the video in a barn.

=== Episode 4 ===
Episode 4 charts the day of the video shoot, and Hayes travelling to Spain to pose for pictures for a 2009 calendar and take a short break.

=== Episode 5 ===
Hayes flies to Dublin, Ireland, for the first public performance of her single.

=== Episode 6 ===
Hayes performs at G-A-Y nightclub in London, and finds out the position of her single in the UK Singles Chart.

== See also ==
- Wannabe (TV series)
