= The Others (The Others album) =

Studio album by The Others
- Released: 31 January 2005
- Length: 44:44
- Label: Mercury

The Others chronology
| The Others (2005) | Inward Parts (2006) |

Professional ratings
Aggregate scores
| Source | Rating |
|---|---|
| Metacritic | 52/100 |
Review scores
| Source | Rating |
| AllMusic | 3/5 stars |
| Drowned in Sound | 6/10 |
| The Guardian | 2/5 stars |
| Playlouder | 4/5 stars |
| Stylus Magazine | F |

The Others is the debut studio album by English band The Others. The album was released on 31 January 2005 in the UK on Mercury Records. On its release it was awarded 8/10 from the NME and 10/10 from Vice Magazine. In 2010, Q included the album in their list "The Fifty Worst Albums Ever!"

== Critical reception ==
The Others was met with "mixed or average" reviews from critics. At Metacritic, which assigns a weighted average rating out of 100 to reviews from mainstream publications, this release received an average score of 52 based on 9 reviews.

In a review for AllMusic, Jason Damas wrote: "The Others' eponymous debut borrows from the sneering, dingy punk rock of the Sex Pistols, but slowed down and delivered more menacingly while opting for a scathing, unpretentious, and populist take on nu-new wave." Damas went on to say the tracks sound "unnecessarily limp and under-written, rendering the entire affair a mere display of this band's potential."

== Track listing ==
The Others track listing
| No. | Title | Length |
|---|---|---|
| 1. | "Lackey" | 3:31 |
| 2. | "In the Background" | 2:51 |
| 3. | "William" | 3:15 |
| 4. | "Almanac" | 2:56 |
| 5. | "How I Nearly Lost You" | 3:43 |
| 6. | "Stan Bowles" | 3:14 |
| 7. | "Community 853" | 3:39 |
| 8. | "Psychovision" | 3:43 |
| 9. | "Johan" | 4:53 |
| 10. | "Southern Glow" | 3:35 |
| 11. | "This Is for the Poor" | 4:23 |
| 12. | "Darren Daniel David" | 4:57 |
| Total length: | | 44:44 |

Japanese bonus tracks
| No. | Title | Length |
|---|---|---|
| 13. | "Boy Is a Girl" |
| 14. | "King Prawn" |

== Singles ==
Four singles were released from The Others, all of which charted on the UK Singles Chart.

Chart performance of singles from The Others
| Single | Release date | Chart peak |
|---|---|---|
| "This Is for the Poor" | 17 May 2004 | 42 |
| "Stan Bowles" | 18 October 2004 | 36 |
| "Lackey" | 17 January 2005 | 21 |
| "William" | 4 April 2005 | 29 |

== Charts ==
Chart performance for The Others
| Chart (2005) | Peak position |
|---|---|
| Scottish Albums (OCC) | 41 |
| UK Albums (OCC) | 51 |
