= The World Is Outside (song) =

2007 song by Ghosts

Single by Ghosts

from the album The World Is Outside
- B-side: "Hate This Music", "Further and Further Away", "Film Song #1"; "Mind Games"
- Released: 4 June 2007
- Genre: Indie pop, post-Britpop
- Length: 3:32
- Label: Tiny Consumer
- Songwriter(s): Ghosts
- Producer(s): Danton Supple, Ghosts

Ghosts singles chronology
"Stay the Night" (2007)	"The World Is Outside" (2007)	"Ghosts" (2007)

"The World Is Outside" is a song by English indie pop band Ghosts. It was the second single to be released from the band's first album, The World Is Outside. It was released on 4 June 2007 and reached a peak position of #35 in the UK Singles Chart.

== Track listings ==
All songs written and composed by Ghosts, except where noted.

=== Download 1 ===
No.	Title	Length
1.	"The World Is Outside"
2.	"The World Is Outside" (Alternate Radio)
3.	"The World Is Outside" (Meck Remix)
4.	"Hate This Music"

=== Download 2 ===
No.	Title	Length
1.	"The World Is Outside" (Olympic Session Version)

=== 7" vinyl ===
Side one
No.	Title	Length
1.	"The World Is Outside"

Side two
No.	Title	Length
1.	"Further and Further Away" (Live @ Olympic Studios)

=== CD single 1 ===
No.	Title	Length
1.	"The World Is Outside"
2.	"Hate This Music"

=== CD single 2 ===
No.	Title	Writer(s)	Length
1.	"The World Is Outside" (Alternate Radio Version)		3:26
2.	"Film Song #1"	Jonny Harris	4:16
3.	"Mind Games" (Live @ Olympic Studios, Video)
4.	"The World Is Outside" (Video)

=== promo CD single ===
No.	Title	Length
1.	"The World Is Outside" (Stuart Price Version)	3:35
2.	"The World Is Outside"	3:33

== Chart performance ==
Chart (2007)	Peak position
UK Singles Chart	35
GfK Dutch Charts	74
Ultratop Chart (Flemish Community)	27
