= Stay the Night (Ghosts song) =

Single by Ghosts

from the album The World Is Outside
- Released: 26 February 2007
- Genre: Indie pop
- Length: 3:44
- Label: Atlantic
- Songwriter(s): Ghosts
- Producer(s): Danton Supple, Ghosts

Ghosts singles chronology
"Musical Chairs" (2007)	"Stay the Night" (2007)	"The World Is Outside" (2007)

"Stay the Night" is a song by English act Ghosts. It was released as a download on 26 February 2007 and as two limited edition 7"s, and a CD single on 19 March that year. The single peaked at #25 in the UK Singles Chart.

== Track listings ==
=== Download #1 ===
No.	Title	Length
1.	"Stay the Night"
2.	"The World Is Outside" (exclusive interview/album preview)

=== Download #2 ===
No.	Title	Length
1.	"Stay the Night" (Acoustic Version)
2.	"Don't Cha"

=== 7" blue vinyl ===
Side one
No.	Title	Length
1.	"Stay the Night"

Side two
No.	Title	Length
1.	"Dark At 4"

=== 7" purple vinyl ===
Side one
No.	Title	Length
1.	"Stay the Night" (Demo Version)

Side two
No.	Title	Length
1.	"Mind Games" (Olympic Session)

=== CD ===
No.	Title	Length
1.	"Stay the Night"
2.	"Hold On"
