= The Others (band) =

British rock band

- Origin: England
- Genre: Indie rock
- Years active: 2002–present
- Labels: Lime; Mercury; Poptones
- Members: Dominic Masters; Johnny Others; Jimmy Lager; Joseph Gardiner-Lowe; Eddie Darko; Alex S Tower(Stef); Steve McCready

The Others are an English rock band. They signed to Poptones in July 2004 and their eponymous debut album was released on 31 January 2005.

== Career ==
The band formed in 2002 and quickly became renowned for their riotous live shows. By 2004, they had started to perform so-called "guerilla gigs", which saw them play on a Hammersmith & City line tube train, on the dodgems at the Leeds festival, and on the famous Abbey Road crossing in London.

2004 saw the band play a number of festivals including Glastonbury, Tin Pan Alley, Clapham Common, TDK and Reading and Leeds for the first time and complete 11 weeks of solid touring, interspersed with many additional concerts in between including parties for Vice Magazine in Berlin, New York, Stockholm and London, shows supporting the Libertines at Brixton Academy and a headline show at The Kentish Town Forum on New Year’s Eve for Frog.

They also played live sessions on Radio 1 for Lamacq Live and on XFM for John Kennedy.

The band, particularly lead singer Dominic Masters (born 12 December 1977), maintain a close relationship with their fanbase, affectionately known as the 853 Kamikaze Stage-Diving Division. The band are also known for accessibility which resulted in the popularity of the websites forum, which played a key part in keeping the fanbase together and organizing the following to collect together for gigs.

Their self-titled debut album divided critics and public alike on its release in 2005. Whilst NME gave it 8/10 and Vice Magazine gave it 10/10 Q rated it one of the worst albums of the year, mocking Masters' boastful attitude towards drug abuse. However, the album did spawn three Top 40 singles for the band; while debut single "This Is for the Poor", narrowly missed the top 40 on its release in April 2004, "Stan Bowles" reached No. 36 in November 2004.

In January 2005, their third single, "Lackey", reached No. 21 in January 2005 and in April of that year the NME awarded The Others the John Peel Innovation Award at the Brat Awards. Following this, "William" became the band's fourth and final single from their debut album charting at No. 29.

The rest of 2005 was spent writing material for their 2nd album and playing UK, European and Japanese festivals including Glastonbury, TDK, Reading and Leeds (for the second time), Roskilde, Lowlands, Pukkelpop, Frequency (Salzburg), Glasgow Smirnoff Experience, Orange Evolution (Newcastle), T in The Park, Download, Godiva (Coventry), Victoria Park Fusion Festival, Amsterdam Paradiso (London Calling), 02 Music Wireless Festival (Hyde Park), Mobtreaux Jazz Festival (Switzerland), Guilfest. Summer Sonic (Osaka/Tokyo - Japan). They also supported Psychedelic Furs at Shepherds Bush Empire.

The band also did two short, well received tours of Italy and ended the year with a 16 date UK tour to road test new material ending the year with their first show in Jersey.

In an interview with Phoenix FM in December 2005, the band confirmed that they had left Poptones.

2006 started with live shows in Zurich and South By South West Festival in Texas.

Upon their return to the UK the band signed a second album deal with Lime Records.

The summer was spent recording and mixing new songs in Kentish Town and in October 2006, the band released their second album, Inward Parts.

This was followed by a two week UK tour and more Italian live dates in December.

2007 started with a couple of UK shows followed by a short tour of Germany.

Three singles were released from this album, "The Truth That Hurts" (in 2006), "Always Be Mine" (2007) and "Probate" (2008).

In August 2007, drummer Martin Oldham left the band for health reasons.

Further UK and European live dates followed and in February 2008, the band went on a temporary hiatus.

After a quiet period, The Others played their first live show in three years, a sold-out show at The Lexington in London. One month later they decamped to a studio in Kent to record eight new songs. In April 2012, the band released the double A side single, "Hardly Know Me" / "I'll Keep You Safe"; their first new material in four years and this was accompanied by a two-week UK tour as well as dates at The Hippodrome in Kingston for the New Slang club night and a show headlining a bill for Sheffield Tramlines Festival.

On Christmas Eve 2012, the band gave away the demos for the third album; Songs for the Disillusioned for free. This news was subsequently covered by the NME. The response was tremendous, going viral and picking up coverage from the UK, as well as Spain, France, Germany, Argentina and Italy amongst others. The free download allocation was reached within two days and in order to meet demand and keep the tracks available for free, they had to be uploaded to four separate sites.

In January 2013, the band announced their decision to offer fans a free download package for every month of 2013. This news was subsequently reported by the digitalspy website.

As part of the band's comeback they returned to the Glastonbury Festival to play on the William's Green Stage. This was the first time the band had played the festival for eight years, ever since playing on The Other Stage in 2005. They followed this with a national UK tour in November, to promote the 3rd album in Sunderland, Glasgow, Manchester, Stoke, Northampton, London, Southampton.

On Christmas Eve 2013, the band followed their third album demos giveaway by giving away the re-recorded, remixed and properly produced version of Songs for the Disillusioned for free.

The band started work writing what would become their fourth album in 2014 and 2015, playing just one London show a year, before taking a break.

In June 2020, during Covid lockdown induced downtime and after Dominic was interviewed by the 22 Grand Pod Podcast, the band set up their own Youtube channel in order to bring their visual, archived material together in one place. Videos included their 2005 performance at Japan's Summer Sonic Festival.

In December 2021, after a 5 year hiatus, the band reconvened in a Brighton rehearsal room to finish writing songs for their fourth album. They also announced they would be playing a one off show at The Grace in Islington, on 30 April 2022 to mark the 20th anniversary of the band's formation. Selling out two months ahead of time and with 22 songs chosen from all three of the band's officially released albums (as well as a 6 song selection of tracks which were unreleased at that point), the show was well received and at over two hours was the longest the band had ever played.

The band spent the rest of 2023 finishing writing and recording their fourth album "Look At You All Now" at Brixton Hill Studios in London. The album was released on 23 March 2023 to positive reviews and was followed 2 days later by an album launch show at The Garage in Islington.

The rest of 2023 was spent writing, with the backing tracks for twenty new songs recorded in January 2024, once again in Brixton. Overdubs were recorded in April and May and the rest of the year was spent mixing what would become two new albums.

In September the band announced they would be playing a show at the 100 Club on Oxford Street marking the 20th anniversary of the release of their debut album. The band would play two sets, their debut album in its entirety followed by a selection of tracks from the 4th, 5th and 6th albums.

The 5th album was titled "Difficulties Understanding" and was released to bandcamp and all streaming platforms on 9 February 2025 (20 years and 9 days to the day of the band's debut album release). It was recorded and mixed at Brixton Hill Studios by Nick Howiantz in early 2024 and mastered by Christophe at Oxygen Music.

On 14 November the band played the "Shiiine On" weekender at Butlins in Minehead. Their first festival appearance since 2013.

The band also announced that in 2026, they would be celebrating the 20th Anniversary of their second album Inward Parts at The Grace in Islington on 20 March 2026. The show will consist of Inward Parts in full, followed by a second set of songs from their 5th and 6th albums.

In December 2025, https://Music-News.com reported on the forthcoming anniversary concert and announced that the band would be releasing their sixth album "When In Doubt" on 20 February 2026.

On 30 January 2026 The Others released "Met You In A Bar" becoming their first single for 14 years. The song and album received positive reviews, with the Travellers Tunes music blog describing the single as the punk-rock roar of the Buzzcocks with Charlatans and Stranglers-esque Hammond organ and describing the album as one that "can only stem from lived experience, from pained self-reflection and coming through, scarred but not beaten."

Also in January 2026, music blog, Edge of Arcady, reviewed an advance copy of the bands sixth album "When In Doubt" as "one of the most accomplished albums of their career." The album also received positive reviews from continental Europe with the Italian music review site "Indie For Bunnies" and the French music blog "La Critique Selon Moi" both awarding it 7.5/10.

== Members ==
=== Current ===
- Dominic Masters – vocals
- Johnny Others – guitar, bass
- Jimmy Lager – guitar
- Joseph Gardiner-Lowe – drums
- Eddie Darko – bass, guitar
- Alex S Tower (Stef) – keys
- Steve McCready – bass, guitar

=== Former ===
- James Le Masurier – drums
- Martin Oldham – drums
- James Moulson – drums, keyboards, electronics, guitar, bass

== Discography ==
=== Studio albums ===
- The Others (31 January 2005) UK number 51

Track List:
Lackey
In The Background
William
Almanac
How I Nearly Lost You
Stan Bowles
Community 853
PsychoVision
Johan
Southern Glow
This Is For The Poor
Darren Daniel Dave

- Inward Parts (30 October 2006)

Track List:
Truth That Hurts
Guard My Kind
Always Be Mine
Thick As Thieves
Looking For A Product
Desolate
Why Should I Try
Watch It
Got No Money
Probate

- Songs for the Disillusioned (24 December 2013)

Track List:
Hardly Know Me (Edit)
Superbok (2013 with brass)
Tic Tok
Books And DVDs
Penny Chews (2013 with brass)
Double Pernod
Where Is The Love (2013 with strings)
I'll Keep You Safe (2013 DND Remix)

- Look At You All Now (22 March 2023)

Track List:
Nowhere To Go
Disdain
Rights
Alibis
Decadent Clothes
Get Out
Rob Peter To Pay Paul
Who Cares
Don't Think You Know Me
Paranoid Times
New Part Of Town
Never Want To See You Again
I Know It Hurts
Billy

- Difficulties Understanding (9 February 2025)

Track List:
Everything You Say
What Is Right For You
Happy Song
For The Living
Nightmare
Brick Lane
Country Song
Right To Negotiate

- When In Doubt (20 February 2026)

Track List:
Never Thought it Would be This Difficult
No Holding Back
I Don't Mind
The Battle Of Menotomy
Don't Have To Be Alone
Met You In A Bar
Stagger To Your Feet
More Than Enough For Me
Chattering Classes
Wanted To Be
Who I Was
All The Things You Said

=== Demo album ===
- (Demos for) Songs for the Disillusioned (24 December 2012)

=== Singles ===
List of singles, with selected chart positions
Title	Year	Peak chart positions	Album
Title	Year	UK	Album
"This Is for the Poor"	May 2004	42	The Others
"Stan Bowles"	October 2004	36	The Others
"Lackey"	January 2005	21	The Others
"William"	April 2005	29	The Others
"The Truth That Hurts"	October 2006	—	Inward Parts
"Always Be Mine"	February 2007	—	Inward Parts
"Probate"	March 2008	—	Inward Parts
"Hardly Know Me"/"I'll Keep You Safe" (double A-side)	April 2012	—	Songs for the Disillusioned
"Met You In A Bar" (Promotional single)	January 2026	—	When In Doubt
