= Samanda =

Sam and Amanda Marchant
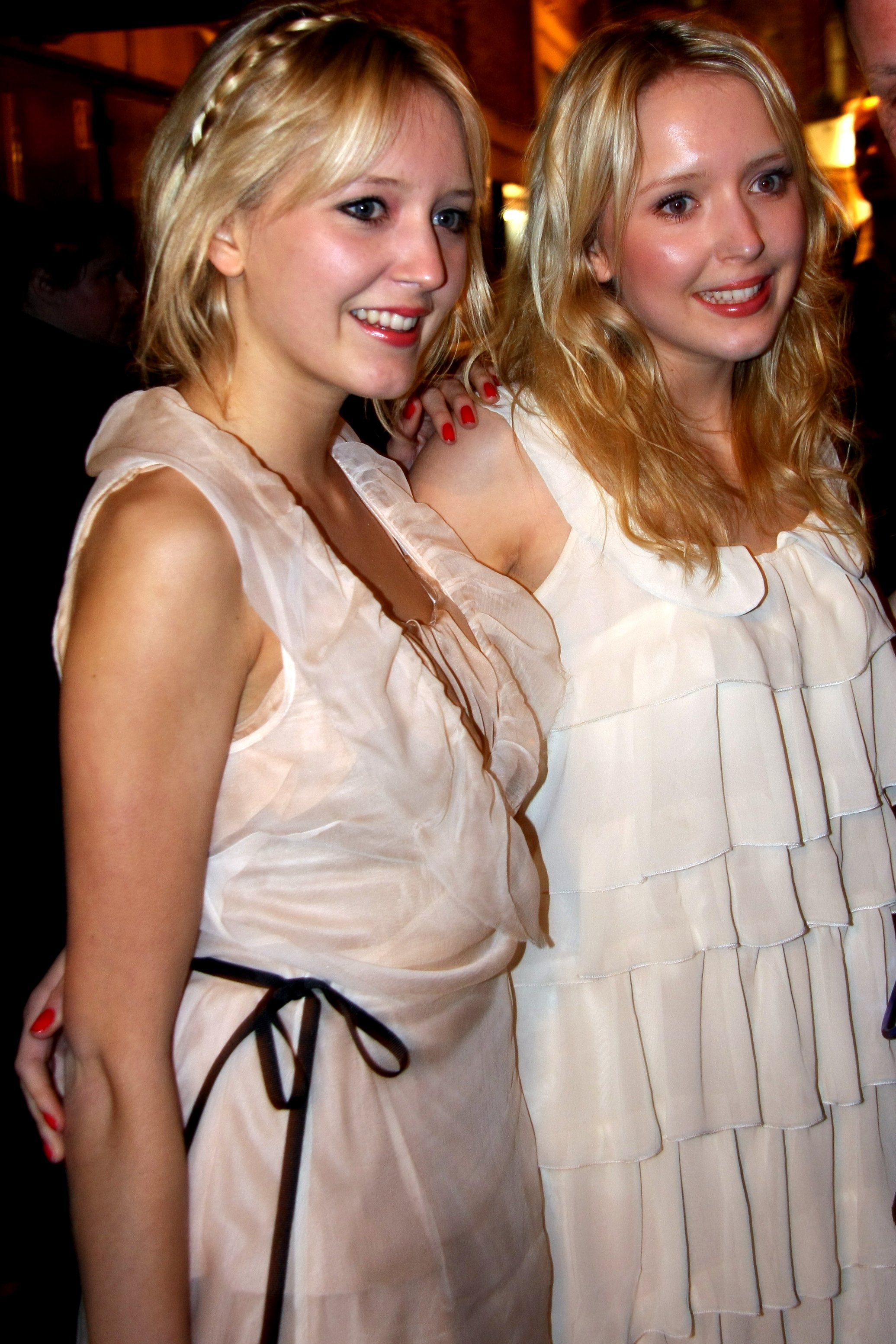
- Samanda at the premiere of Fool's Gold in London's Leicester Square in April 2008.
- Born: Amanda Louise Marchant; Samantha Joanne Marchant; 28 June 1988 (age 38); Knutton, Newcastle-under-Lyme, Staffordshire, England
- Other name: Samanda
- Education: Manchester Metropolitan University
- Occupations: Television personalities; models; singers; students
- Known for: Big Brother 8 contestants
- Musical career
- Genre: Pop
- Instrument: Vocals
- Years active: 2007–2010
- Label: Sony BMG

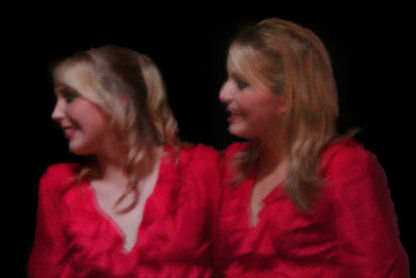
Samanda performing their debut single "Barbie Girl"

Amanda Louise Marchant and Samantha Joanne Marchant (born 28 June 1988), better known as Samanda, are a female duo, consisting of identical twin sisters who first came to fame on Big Brother in 2007, in which they jointly achieved second place.

They released their cover of Aqua's hit song "Barbie Girl" on 8 October 2007 and it entered the UK Singles Chart at number 26.

Their second single titled "Honey Love" entered the chart on 22 August 2008 at number 125. This song was a cover of Donny Osmond's Number One UK Hit "Puppy Love" and was a tie-in with Sugar Puffs cereal (as their mascot is the Honey Monster, who also appeared in the video).

As of 2019, they are both married and have one child each (both a few months apart and girls).

== Big Brother ==
Amanda and Sam finished runners up in the eighth series of Big Brother in the UK despite being bookmakers favourite to win the show in the run up to the final. During their time on the show they received the nickname "Samanda" by the press.

Before their fame they were social-care students at Manchester Metropolitan University. While they were still students at university, the girls took part in an advertising campaign for a new travelcard that offered half-price travel to students. To help publicise the cards, the girls took part in a photoshoot at Manchester Piccadilly railway station with a local magician who performed a double version of Sawing a woman in half, in which he sawed both girls in half and apparently switched their lower halves before reassembling them.

Samanda had previously held the longest duration as housemates spent in the house in Big Brother UK history, after being in the house for a total of 94 days. The current record belongs to Nikki Grahame after spending a total of 157 days in the big brother house. They are also the only housemates ever to reach the final of the series without receiving a nomination.

== Career ==
Amanda and Sam have their own skincare and fragrance range. Samanda by Young and Pure is aimed at girls aged 10–22 and was released on 5 November 2007. In January 2008 they signed a two-year contract with Young and Pure line of natural skin care products for teens worth between £40,000 and £150,000.

In 2008, the girls released a keep fit DVD entitled, Samanda - The Twins: Dance Workout. They were also signed by Hello Kitty as the faces of their social networking website as well as online bloggers for the site.

On GMTV with an interview with Ben Shepherd Sam and Amanda stated that they made over £1,000,000 between them. They have released two music singles since leaving Big Brother: a cover of Aqua's "Barbie Girl", and "Honey Love" which is a cover of Puppy Love by Donny Osmond with slightly different lyrics featuring the Honey Monster from the Sugar Puffs adverts.

A further unreleased song "Whistle for a hottie" has been leaked on YouTube. The duo were celebrity guest judges at the Miss and Miss Teen Galaxy UK pageant, at the Thistle hotel in Manchester on 29 March 2009. They hosted a Q&A session with their fans on 27 April 2009, and a proportion of revenues generated was donated to the Teenage Cancer Trust.

== Discography ==
=== Singles ===
Year	Single	Chart positions
Year	Single	UK
2007	"Barbie Girl"	26
2008	"Honey Love"	125
2010	"Whistle For A Hottie"	—
