= William (song) =

Single by The Others

from the album The Others
- Released: 4 April 2005
- Recorded: 2004
- Genre: Indie rock
- Label: Mercury Records

The Others singles chronology
| "Lackey" (2005) | "William" (2005) | "The Truth that Hurts" (2006) |

"William" is a song by English indie rock band The Others and is featured on their debut album, The Others. Released on 4 April 2005, it was the fourth single from the album and charted at number 29.

== Track listing ==
1. "William"
2. "This Is for the Poor"
3. "William"
4. "Psychovision"
5. "William"
6. "Stan Bowles"
7. "Community 853"

== Charts ==
| Chart (2005) | Peak position |
|---|---|
| UK Singles (OCC) | 29 |
