= Five O'Clock Heroes =

American rock band

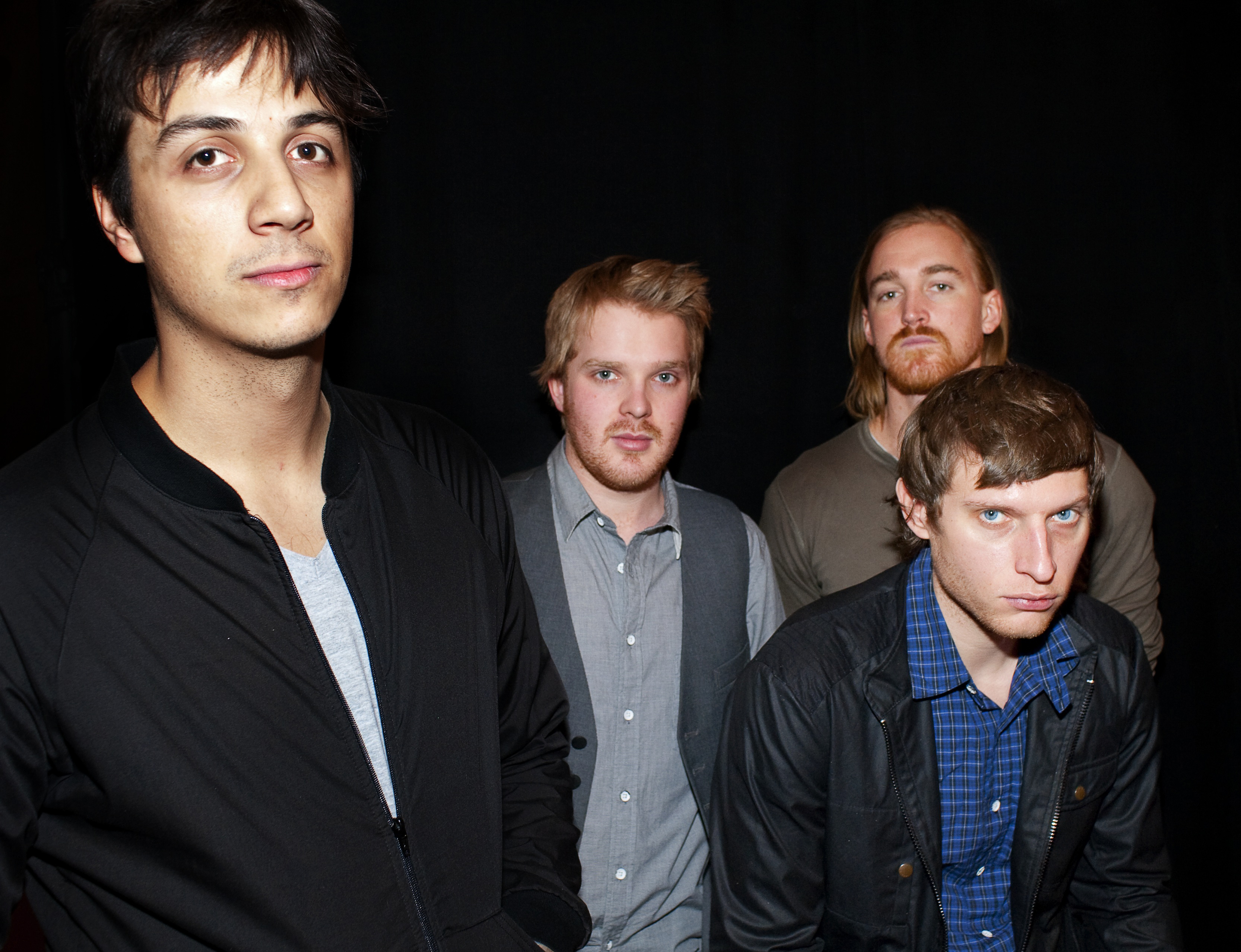

Background information
- Origin: New York City, United States
- Genres: Indie rock
- Years active: 2003–present
- Labels: Glaze Records, PIAS
- Members: Antony Ellis (guitar, lead vocals); Teddy Griffith (guitar); Adam Morse (bass); Tom Smith (drums)
- Past members: Michael Williams (drums); Patrick Fowler (drums); Elliot Thompson (guitar); Nader Kheirbek (bass); Sam Embery (drums)
- Website: www.thefiveoclockheroes.com

Five O'Clock Heroes are a new wave influenced indie rock band currently based in New York City. Lead singer Antony Ellis is originally from Northampton in the UK. They first formed in 2003 and to date have released five singles and three albums, Bend to the Breaks, Speak Your Language, and Different Times.

Their name comes from The Jam's song "Just Who Is The Five O'Clock Hero?", which appeared on their album The Gift of 1982. The band cite the likes of Elvis Costello, The Police, Joe Jackson and Dexys Midnight Runners as major influences, and have made a name for themselves, particularly in the UK, through charismatic and energetic live performances. Support slots with The Rakes, Brendan Benson, The Bravery, The Paddingtons, Jet and Albert Hammond Jr. have ensured their music has reached a considerable audience.

Signed in the UK to their own label Glaze Records and in Europe and Japan to PIAS, the band have received critical acclaim from the likes of NME, Drowned In Sound and musicOMH.com.

In 2022 the band began releasing a series of one off singles written by frontman Antony Ellis.

== Discography ==
- Bend to the Breaks, released September 18, 2006
- Speak Your Language, released July 7, 2008
- Different Times released February 15, 2011
