= Speak Your Language =

Studio album by Five O'Clock Heroes
- Released: July 7, 2008
- Recorded: 2007–2008
- Label: Glaze

Five O'Clock Heroes chronology
Bend to the Breaks (2006)	Speak Your Language (2008)	Different Times (2011)

Professional ratings
Review scores
Source	Rating
NME	(3/10)
The Sunday Times	1/5 stars

Speak Your Language is the second album by Five O'Clock Heroes, released on July 7, 2008 via Glaze Records. The album was leaked on the Internet in the first week of June 2008.

== Single ==
The song "Who" was the first single taken from the album, and is a duet recorded with Agyness Deyn. The video of this single was ready in the beginning of May 2008 and posted on Five O'Clock Heroes' website on May 5, 2008. The single itself was released on June 23, 2008. The single was poorly received by NME, giving it a 2/10 rating.

== Track listing ==
1. "Judas" – 3:09
2. "New York Chinese Laundry" – 3:42
3. "Who" (feat. Agyness Deyn) – 3:53
4. "Speak Your Language" – 2:58
5. "Alice" – 2:47
6. "Trust" – 2:44
7. "Don't Say Don't" – 4:03
8. "Everybody Knows It" – 3:11
9. "These Girls" – 2:58
10. "God & Country" – 2:57
11. "Radio Lover" – 3:55
12. "Happy Together" – 3:01
13. "Grab Me" – 2:29
