= Savannah–Chanelle Vineyards =

Savannah–Chanelle Vineyards is a 53-acre (210,000 m^{2}) vineyard located in the eastern foothills of the Santa Cruz mountains above Saratoga, California and the Silicon Valley. The vineyard was renamed Savannah-Chanel Vineyards in 1996 when the Congress Springs Vineyards were purchased by the Michael Ballard family, naming the vineyard after the family's two daughters.

The existing vines and winery itself have been located on the same hill for over a century.

== Lawsuit ==
In 1998 the Ballards were sued by Chanel cosmetics over the use of the name "Chanel" in the winery's name even though it had no relation to their corporation. Rather than fight a long costly court battle, the Ballards modified the vineyard name to Savannah–Chanelle Vineyards. The new name first appeared on their 1999 label wines.

== Wines ==
Savannah–Chanelle Vineyards is best known for their Pinot noir wines produced from both local and estate grapes. They also produce Zinfandel wines that are produced from the original estate Zinfandel vines planted in 1910. These vines are the oldest surviving Zinfandel vines in California. Cabernet Franc, planted in 1920, Port, Chardonnay and several other varietals are also produced by the vineyard.
