= Big Brother (British TV series) series 8 =

Coordinates: 51°39′23″N 0°16′02″W

Big Brother
- Series 8
- Series eight logo
- Presented by: Davina McCall
- No. of days: 94
- No. of housemates: 22
- Winner: Brian Belo
- Runner-up: Amanda & Sam Marchant
- Companion shows: Big Brother's Little Brother; Big Brother's Big Mouth; Big Brother Live; Diary Room Uncut; Big Brother: On the Couch
- No. of episodes: 96

Release
- Original network: Channel 4
- Original release: 30 May – 31 August 2007

Series chronology
- ← Previous; Series 7 Next → Series 9

Big Brother 2007, also known as Big Brother 8, is the eighth series of the British reality television series Big Brother. The show followed twenty-three contestants, known as housemates, who were isolated from the outside world for an extended period of time in a custom built House. Each week, one or more of the housemates were eliminated from the competition and left the House. The last remaining housemate, Brian Belo, was declared the winner, winning a cash prize of £100,000 (the second housemate to do so after Liam McGough was awarded the same amount in the third week).

The series launched on Channel 4 on 30 May 2007 and ended on 31 August 2007, lasting 94 days - the longest British edition of Big Brother to date. Davina McCall returned as presenter for her eighth consecutive year. Eleven women housemates entered on launch night, with an additional seven men being introduced by the time of the fourth week. The series was watched by an average of 3.9 million viewers, the lowest viewed series of the show at the time.

The first series of Big Brother to air since the highly controversial fifth celebrity series, Big Brother 8 was the subject of viewer complaints and press attention, mainly regarding the ejection of a housemate for the use of a racial slur.

== Housemates ==
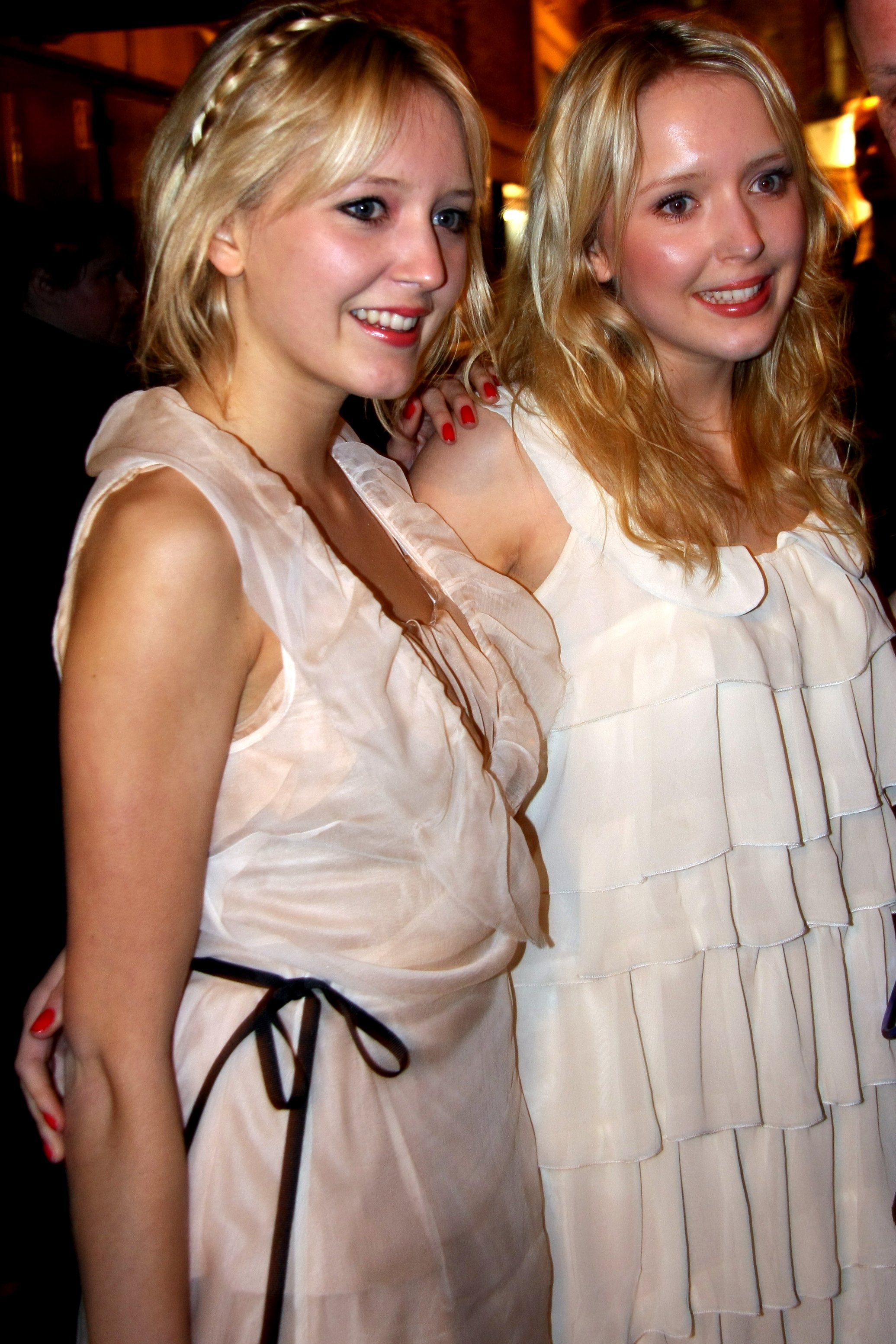
Amanda & Sam Marchant

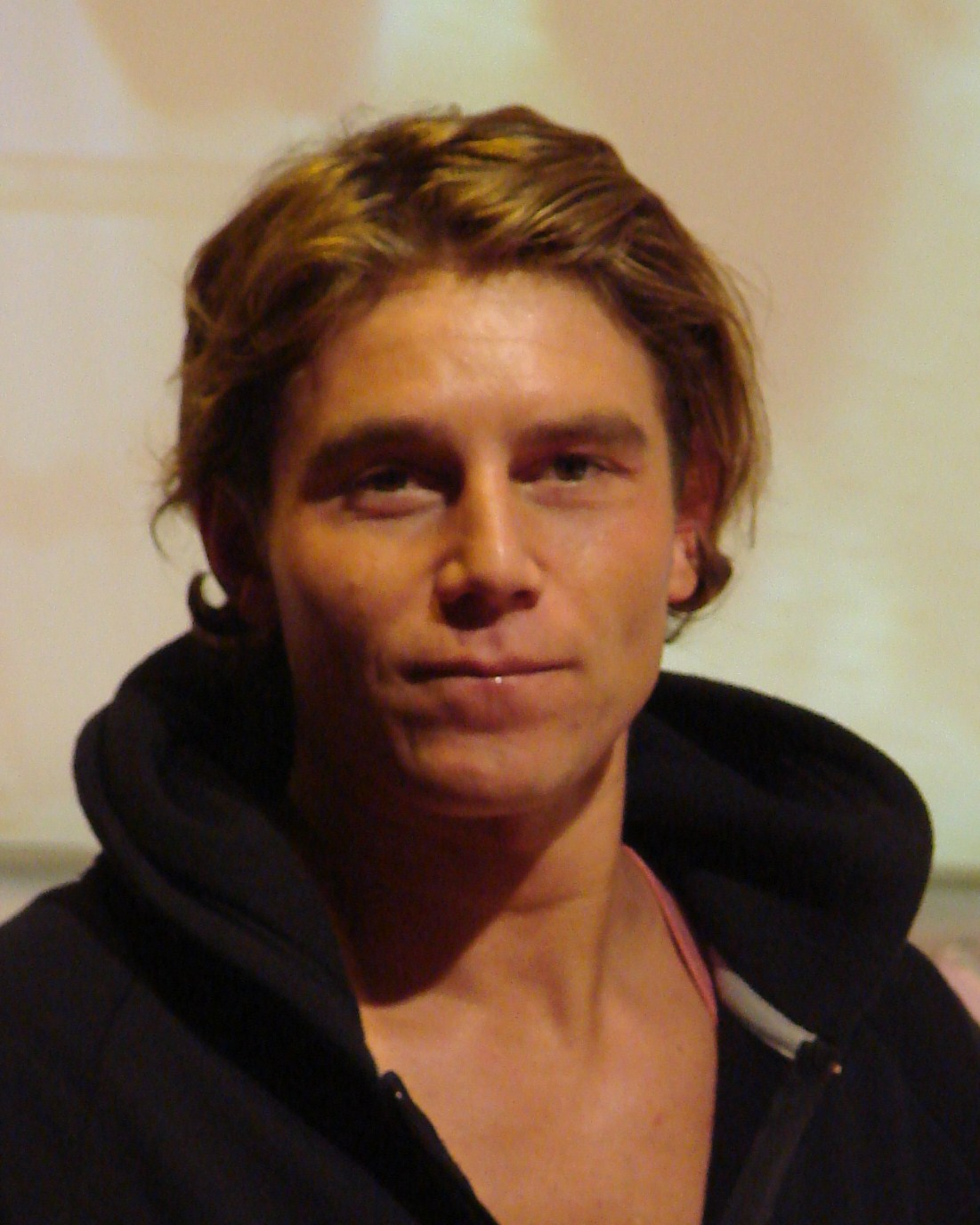
Ziggy Lichman

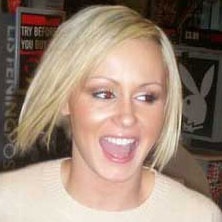
Chanelle Hayes

There were a total of 22 housemates in this series of Big Brother. Each week, two or more housemates were nominated to be evicted by the general public until the winner was left. All of the housemates that entered on the first day were female, then on the third day; a male housemate – Ziggy – entered the house. On 7 June 2007 it was announced on Big Brother's Big Mouth that Day 10 would see the addition of two male housemates, in replacement of the cancelled eviction. These two housemates were Gerry and Seány. On 15 June, four new male housemates entered the house. They were Billi, Jonathan, Liam, and Brian. Five new housemates, Amy, Jonty, Shanessa, David & Kara-Louise entered the house in a separate room called Halfway House on Day 59.

Name	Age on entry	Hometown	Day entered	Day exited	Result
Brian Belo	19	Essex (originally from Nigeria)	17	94	Winner
Amanda & Sam Marchant (Note: Amanda & Sam originally entered the House as individual Housemates. They accepted an offer from Big Brother on Day 69 to become a joint Housemate for the remainder of the series.)	18	Stoke-on-Trent	1	94	Runner-up
Liam McGough	22	County Durham	17	94	3rd place (Note: Seány, Carole and Jonathan had to choose one of their fellow Housemates to receive what they believed to be the £100,000 prize fund on Day 22. They chose Liam and he was awarded £100,000 separate from the eventual winner of the series.)
Zachary "Ziggy" Lichman	26	London	3	94	4th place
Carole Vincent	53	London	1	94	5th place
Jonathon "Jonty" Stern	36	London	59	94	6th place
Kara-Louise Horne	22	London	59	87	Evicted
Tracey Barnard	36	Cambridgeshire	1	87	Evicted
Gerasimos "Gerry" Stergiopoulos	31	London (originally from Greece)	10	94	Evicted
Amy Alexandra	21	Grimsby, Lincolnshire	59	73	Evicted
David Parnaby	25	Ayr	59	66	Evicted
Shanessa Reilly	27	Cardiff	59	66	Evicted
Chanelle Hayes	19	Wakefield	1	62	Walked (Note: Chanelle returned to the House as a guest not eligible to win on Day 89 as part of a task. She was allowed to remain in the House after the task, but as she broke a rule of discussing the outside world, she was asked to leave the house immediately.)
Charley Uchea	21	London	1	59	Evicted
Nicky Maxwell	27	Watford (Originally from India)	1	52	Evicted
Laura Williams	23	Rhondda Valleys	1	38	Evicted
Jonathan Durden	49	London	17	35	Walked
Nabeel "Billi" Bhatti	25	London	17	31	Evicted
Seán "Seány" O'Kane	26	Derry	10	24	Evicted
Shabnam Paryani	22	London	1	17	Evicted
Lesley Brain	60	Tetbury	1	11	Walked
Emily Parr	19	Bristol	1	9	Ejected

== House guests ==
Name	Age on entry	Hometown	Day entered	Day exited
Thaila "Pauline" Zucchi	26	Swindon	40	42

== Nominations table ==
	Week 1	Week 2	Week 3	Week 4	Week 5	Week 6	Week 7	Week 8	Week 9	Week 10	Week 11	Week 12	Week 13 Final		Nominations received
Brian	Not in House		Seány, Carole	Billi, Gerry	Gerry, Carole	Tracey, Carole	Gerry, Tracey	Gerry, Charley	No nominations	Jonty, Kara-Louise	No nominations	Jonty, Kara-Louise	Winner (Day 94)		3
Amanda	Not eligible	Carole, Nicky	Carole, Tracey	Tracey, Charley	Carole, Tracey	Carole, Nicky	Carole, Tracey	Carole, Tracey	No nominations	Jonty, Kara-Louise	No nominations	Jonty, Kara-Louise	Runners-up (Day 94)		0
Sam	Not eligible	Shabnam, Carole	Carole, Liam	Billi, Carole	Carole, Tracey	Carole, Charley	Carole, Tracey	Carole, Tracey	No nominations	Jonty, Kara-Louise	No nominations	Jonty, Kara-Louise	Runners-up (Day 94)		0
Liam	Not in House		Jonathan, Charley	Tracey, Billi	Tracey, Charley	Nicky, Charley	Charley, Nicky	Charley, Tracey	No nominations	Kara-Louise, Jonty	No nominations	Kara-Louise, Jonty	Third place (Day 94)		4
Ziggy	Shabnam, Emily	Not eligible	Charley, Nicky	Billi, Charley	Laura, Charley	Nicky, Charley	Nicky	Tracey, Charley	No nominations	Amy, Gerry	No nominations	Kara-Louise, Tracey	Fourth place (Day 94)		12
Carole	Not eligible	Not eligible	Laura, Nicky	Laura, Nicky	Laura, Chanelle	Nicky, Tracey	Nicky, Chanelle	Charley, Ziggy	No nominations	Amy, Kara-Louise	Nominated	Tracey, Ziggy	Fifth place (Day 94)		21
Jonty	Not in House								No nominations	Gerry, Kara-Louise	No nominations	Brian, Liam	Sixth place (Day 94)		9
Kara-Louise	Not in House								Halfway Housemate	Jonty, Amy	No nominations	Tracey, Liam	Evicted (Day 87)		11
Tracey	Not eligible	Not eligible	Seány, Jonathan	Carole, Billi	Ziggy, Chanelle	Ziggy, Gerry	Gerry, Ziggy	Gerry, Ziggy	Halfway Housemate	Amy, Gerry	No nominations	Kara-Louise, Jonty	Evicted (Day 87)		26
Gerry	Not in House	Shabnam, Tracey	Charley, Liam	Nicky, Tracey	Laura, Nicky	Charley, Nicky	Nicky, Charley	Charley, Tracey	No nominations	Amy, Jonty	Nominated	Evicted (Day 80)			17
Amy	Not in House								No nominations	Kara-Louise, Gerry	Evicted (Day 73)				5
David	Not in House								Halfway Housemate	Evicted (Day 66)					N/A
Shanessa	Not in House								Halfway Housemate	Evicted (Day 66)					N/A
Chanelle	Not eligible	Not eligible	Charley, Seány	Charley, Billi	Charley, Laura	Charley, Nicky	Charley	Charley, Tracey	Walked (Day 62)						9
Charley	Not eligible	Not eligible	Nicky, Seány	~~Billi,~~; ~~Chanelle~~	Chanelle, Brian	Chanelle, Gerry	Gerry, Ziggy	Chanelle, Gerry	Evicted (Day 59)						25
Nicky	Not eligible	Not eligible	Jonathan, Seány	Billi, Carole	Gerry, Ziggy	Gerry, Ziggy	Ziggy, Gerry	Evicted (Day 52)							20
Laura	Not eligible	Not eligible	Carole, Jonathan	Carole, Ziggy	Ziggy, Chanelle	Evicted (Day 38)									7
Jonathan	Not in House		Nicky, Tracey	Tracey, Nicky	Laura, Chanelle	Walked (Day 35)									5
Billi	Not in House		Carole, Jonathan	~~Nicky,~~; ~~Charley~~	Evicted (Day 31)										8
Seány	Not in House	Tracey, Shabnam	Brian, Tracey	Evicted (Day 24)											5
Shabnam	Not eligible	Not eligible	Evicted (Day 17)												4
Lesley	Not eligible	Walked (Day 11)													0
Emily	Not eligible	Ejected (Day 9)													1
Notes	1	2	none	3	none	4	5	none	6	7	8	9	10		
Against public vote	Emily, Shabnam	Carole, Shabnam, Tracey	Carole, Jonathan, Seány	Billi, Carole, Tracey	Chanelle, Laura	Charley, Nicky	Gerry, Nicky	Charley, Tracey	David, Kara-Louise, Shanessa, Tracey	Amanda & Sam, Amy, Jonty, Kara-Louise	Brian, Carole, Gerry, Jonty, Kara-Louise, Liam	Jonty, Kara-Louise, Tracey	Amanda & Sam, Brian, Carole, Jonty, Liam, Ziggy		
Walked	none	Lesley	none		Jonathan	none			Chanelle	none					
Ejected	Emily	none													
Evicted	Eviction cancelled	Shabnam; 81.4% to evict	Seány; 44.5% to evict	Billi; 55.1% to evict	Laura; 68.1% to evict	Charley; 75.8% to fake evict	Nicky; 76% to evict	Charley; 85.6% to evict	Shanessa; 38% to evict	Amy; 58% to evict	Gerry; 3 of 3 votes to evict	Tracey; 38.5% to evict	Jonty; 3.0% (out of 6)	Liam; 19.1% (out of 3)	
Evicted	Eviction cancelled	Shabnam; 81.4% to evict	Seány; 44.5% to evict	Billi; 55.1% to evict	Laura; 68.1% to evict	Charley; 75.8% to fake evict	Nicky; 76% to evict	Charley; 85.6% to evict	Shanessa; 38% to evict	Amy; 58% to evict	Gerry; 3 of 3 votes to evict	Tracey; 38.5% to evict	Carole; 4.9% (out of 6)	Liam; 19.1% (out of 3)	
Evicted	Eviction cancelled	Shabnam; 81.4% to evict	Seány; 44.5% to evict	Billi; 55.1% to evict	Laura; 68.1% to evict	Charley; 75.8% to fake evict	Nicky; 76% to evict	Charley; 85.6% to evict	Shanessa; 38% to evict	Amy; 58% to evict	Gerry; 3 of 3 votes to evict	Tracey; 38.5% to evict	Carole; 4.9% (out of 6)	Amanda & Sam; 39.7% (out of 2)	
Evicted	Eviction cancelled	Shabnam; 81.4% to evict	Seány; 44.5% to evict	Billi; 55.1% to evict	Laura; 68.1% to evict	Charley; 75.8% to fake evict	Nicky; 76% to evict	Charley; 85.6% to evict	David; 37% to evict	Amy; 58% to evict	Gerry; 3 of 3 votes to evict	Kara-Louise; 30.8% to evict	Ziggy; 15.3% (out of 4)	Amanda & Sam; 39.7% (out of 2)	
Evicted	Eviction cancelled	Shabnam; 81.4% to evict	Seány; 44.5% to evict	Billi; 55.1% to evict	Laura; 68.1% to evict	Charley; 75.8% to fake evict	Nicky; 76% to evict	Charley; 85.6% to evict	David; 37% to evict	Amy; 58% to evict	Gerry; 3 of 3 votes to evict	Kara-Louise; 30.8% to evict	Brian; 60.3% to win		

Notes

- ^Note 1: As the only male housemate, only Ziggy was eligible to nominate this week. The eviction was later cancelled due to Emily being ejected.
- ^Note 2: This week, new housemates Seány and Gerry were two of four housemates allowed to nominate, and together had to choose the other two housemates to nominate with them. They chose Sam and Amanda.
- ^Note 3: As punishment for discussing nominations, Billi and Charley's nominations were voided by Big Brother. Had this not happened Charley and Nicky would have faced the public vote with them.
- ^Note 4: Week 6 was Fake Week, and the "eviction" on Day 45 had the "evicted" housemate, Charley, interviewed by Davina - with the interview shown on the plasma screen in the house - and then put back in the house.
- ^Note 5: As punishment for discussing nominations, Chanelle and Ziggy were only allowed to nominate one housemate each.
- ^Note 6: After continuous swapping of housemates between the Main House and the Halfway House, the housemates remaining in the Halfway House automatically faced the public vote, in which there was a double eviction.
- ^Note 7: Amanda and Sam chose to become one housemate on Day 69. However, as a result they both automatically faced eviction. As well as finding out that they were nominated, Amy, Jonty and Kara-Louise were also able to see who nominated who.
- ^Note 8: For Week 11's shopping task those who won mini-tasks gained "guru status" and were immune from eviction. All other housemates automatically faced the public vote. The Gurus had to decide from the two housemates with the highest number of votes (Carole with 49% & Gerry with 24%) whom to evict. The Gurus unanimously decided to evict Gerry.
- ^Note 9: In Week 12, there was a double eviction. As such, the three or more housemates with the most nominations faced the public vote.
- ^Note 10: There were no nominations in the final week. The public were voting for the housemate they wanted to win, rather than evict.

== Weekly summary ==
Week 1	Entrances	On Day 1, Sam, Amanda, Lesley, Charley, Tracey, Chanelle, Shabnam, Emily, Laura, Nicky and Carole entered the house.; On Day 3, Ziggy entered the house.
Week 1	Tasks	On Day 2 the housemates were given a breakdancing task, they were split into two crews and competed against each other.
Week 1	Punishments	On Day 6, Shabnam was punished for discussing nominations. Big Brother made the bathroom off-limits to all housemates.; On Day 8, Ziggy and Emily were punished by being forced to pick another housemate to be punished on their behalf. They chose Shabnam. As a result, Shabnam's clothes, make-up, and belongings were confiscated by Big Brother.
Week 1	Nominations	This week, only Ziggy was allowed to nominate. He nominated Emily and Shabnam, and they faced the public vote.
Week 1	Exits	On Day 9, Emily was ejected from the house after using a racial slur. The eviction that was scheduled between Emily and Shabnam, was eventually cancelled.
Week 2	Entrances	On Day 10, Gerry and Seány entered the house.; On Day 17, Billi, Jonathan, Liam and Brian entered the house.
Week 2	Tasks	Big Brother gave the housemates a charades task with a twist of having to play it under water. As a prize for completing the task successfully, housemates were rewarded with a chinese take away meal.; On Day 12, Gerry and Seány were instructed by Big Brother to interview each of their fellow housemates in the "Big Brother Board Room" (the vestibule before the front door of the House) to decide which two housemates would be nominating alongside them.; On Day 14, the housemates were given a shopping task which instructed them to remain lying down (but moving), dressed in sardine suits in a sardine tin filled with brine and fish guts. The housemates failed the task after only remaining in the tin for one hour and 26 minutes. Hidden in a small sardine tin in the garden was the magic number, four hours and 20 minutes, this was the time limited Big Brother had set for the housemates to remain in the tin in order to win the task.; On Day 15, the house were given a pile of pork pies and tankards of beer, and a dart board. On the bottom of each pie, there was a conversation topic, and all housemates had to contribute to the discussions. Afterwards, all housemates had to nominate one person to put up a set of shelves in the Diary Room without instructions. The housemates chose Carole, who failed the task
Week 2	Twists	New housemates Gerry and Seány were told that them, and 2 other housemates would be the only housemates nominating this week. They had to choose 2 other housemates to nominate. They chose Amanda and Sam.
Week 2	Punishments	On Day 14, due to Gerry and other housemates discussing nominations, Big Brother took away the house's bathroom privileges.; On Day 15, Seány pushed a pork pie into the diary room camera, and as punishment Nicky had to clean the windows for two hours.
Week 2	Nominations	The housemates nominated for the second time. Amanda, Gerry, Sam and Seány were the only housemates to nominate. Carole, Shabnam and Tracey received the most nominations and faced the public vote.
Week 2	Exits	On Day 11, Lesley walked from the house.; On Day 17, Shabnam was evicted from the house, receiving 81.4% of the public vote to evict.
Week 3	Tasks	On Day 18, Billi, Jonathan, Liam and Brian successfully performed "YMCA" as 'The Big Brother Village People' and won a luxury shopping budget.; Housemates also had to swim the equivalent distance to the width of the English Channel in the swimming pool for this week's shopping task, which they successfully completed.; Amanda, for completing the most lengths, was given the task of completing the shopping list for this week, alone.; On Day 22, Seány, Carole and Jonathan had to choose a housemate to receive what the housemates believe is the £100,000 prize fund. They chose Liam.
Week 3	Punishments	After using written communication, Ziggy and Carole were given chalk and school ties, and were made to write "I must not participate in written communication within the Big Brother house. This is a fundamental breach of the Big Brother Rules, for which I apologise." and "I must not take writing materials lent to me in good faith by Big Brother and then use this writing material to communicate secret messages. Both acts are a fundamental breach of the Big Brother Rules, for which I apologise." 100 times.
Week 3	Nominations	The housemates nominated for the third time. Carole, Jonathan and Seány received the most nominations and faced the public vote.
Week 3	Exits	On Day 24, Seány was evicted from the house, receiving 44.5% of the public vote to evict.
Week 4	Tasks	On Day 25, the housemates had a Knobbly Knees Contest, in which Brian and Charley won. Their prize was a holiday in the Big Brother caravan.; On Day 26, they were told that for this week's task, the housemates must stay awake for 60 hours, and were only allowed 3 hours of sleep between them, and if someone closed their eyes for more than a minute, a clock on the wall would begin counting down. For a mini task on Day 27, Liam and Laura were dressed up as Little Bo Peep, and had to correctly count how many times the other housemates – who were dressed as sheep – jumped over fences placed in the garden. They completed this task successfully, and earned an extra hour on the sleep clock. However, the housemates voted and decided to quit the task, and subsequently failed the task.
Week 4	Punishments	For discussing nominations with other housemates, both Billi and Charley's nominations were cancelled.; For failing their sleep task, housemates were forced to live on a diet of 3 portions of slop a day.; After Billi and Charley continuously argued, they were sent to the happy room to cheer up.
Week 4	Nominations	The housemates nominated for the fourth time. Billi, Carole and Tracey received the most nominations and faced the public vote.
Week 4	Exits	On Day 31, Billi was evicted from the house, receiving 55.1% of the public vote to evict.
Week 5	Tasks	Carole had to match the seven deadly sins to housemates. She picked Laura as sloth, Tracey as greed, Ziggy as gluttony, Liam as lust, Amanda as pride, Nicky as envy, and Charley as wrath. Each housemate was given their own task. Four or more housemates must pass this task to receive a luxury shopping budget. All but Charley passed. As a reward, The contestants were given a party with a chocolate fountain, alcohol and "Seven Sin costumes" while Charley sat in the Sin Bin watching them and missing the party.
Week 5	Nominations	The housemates nominated for the fifth time. Chanelle and Laura received the most nominations and faced the public vote.
Week 5	Exits	On Day 35, Jonathan walked from the house.; On Day 38, Laura was evicted from the house, receiving 68.1% of the public vote to evict.
Week 6 (Fake Week)	Entrances	On Day 40, 'Pauline' entered the house.
Week 6 (Fake Week)	Tasks	Unbeknownst to the housemates, their task this week was to discover that their new housemate Pauline was really British actress Thaila Zucchi. They were successful, and received a luxury shopping budget. They also were given characters and a storyline, and had to perform their own soap opera, Housemates. They also had to perform Kylie Minogue's "Can't Get You Out of My Head". Other tasks including making quilt patches, banners and songs, and reading incorrect messages in different languages for a fake global initiative called Warmth Not Waste, made up by Big Brother.
Week 6 (Fake Week)	Punishments	As part of fake week, the housemates were punished for crimes they did not commit. Carole, Brian and Amanda had to glue sweetcorn back onto corn on the cob, Chanelle, Charley and Gerry had to measure 3 balls of string with a 3 cm ruler, Liam, Nicky and Sam had to paint a wall and watch it dry, and Ziggy, Tracey and Amanda had to cut grass with nail scissors. For talking about nominations, Charley and Nicky's suitcases, and all their clothes and makeup, were confiscated.
Week 6 (Fake Week)	Nominations	The housemates nominated for the sixth time. Charley and Nicky received the most nominations and faced the public vote.
Week 6 (Fake Week)	Exits	On Day 42, once her task was finished, 'Pauline' left the house. 'Pauline' left the House on Day 42 once she had finished her task.; On Day 45, Charley was evicted from the house, receiving 75.8% of the public vote to evict. However, as part of fake week, Charley was fake evicted. She was interviewed and then put back into the house.
Week 7	Tasks	Housemates had to have a party for Big Brother's birthday, where five housemates partied, and the remaining six provided the entertainment. They had to party until Big Brother told them to stop. Housemates passed this task.; Nicky had a personal task to perform a stand-up routine to win the housemates a takeaway and Gerry had to answer questions to win alcohol to go with the takeaway.
Week 7	Punishments	For discussing nominations, Chanelle and Ziggy were restricted to only one nomination each.
Week 7	Nominations	The housemates nominated for the seventh time. Gerry and Nicky received the most nominations and faced the public vote.
Week 7	Exits	On Day 52, Nicky was evicted from the house, receiving 76% of the public vote to evict.
Week 8	Tasks	On Day 53, the housemates were given the task of answering philosophical questions.; For their weekly task, housemates have to run a TV Channel, BBTV. After completing various TV shows (which included an X-Factor style talent show) and news bulletins (which featured messages from their families) the housemates passed the task.; On Day 58, the housemates were asked to match sounds they heard to different housemates. They passed the task, and were given toilet paper with their faces on as a prize. The housemates also got a chance to speak to the Final 4 Housemates in Big Brother Australia 7 House.
Week 8	Nominations	The housemates nominated for the eighth time. Charley and Tracey received the most nominations and faced the public vote.
Week 8	Exits	On Day 59, Charley was evicted from the house, receiving 85.6% of the public vote to evict.
Week 9	Entrances	On Day 59, Amy, Jonty, Shanessa, David and Kara-Louise entered the "Halfway House".
Week 9	Tasks	On Day 63, the halfway housemates had to sit in boxes and jump out at 8:10. The housemate who jumped the nearest to the time would be moved to the main house, and would need to pick a housemate to move to the halfway house. Shanessa won.
Week 9	Transfers	On Day 62, Kara-Louise and David moved into the main house after they were chosen by the current Housemates. The Housemates then had to choose one of themselves to move to the Halfway House, to which Ziggy said he wanted to go.; On Day 63, Shanessa entered the main house after winning the Jack-in-a-Box task, and had to choose a current Housemate to replace her. She chose Liam.; On Day 64, Amy, Jonty, Liam and Ziggy moved back into the house in exchange for David, Kara-Louise, Shanessa and Tracey.
Week 9	Nominations	This week, no nominations took place. Instead, the housemates who were moved into the "Halfway House" on Day 64 would be nominated. David, Kara-Louise, Shanessa and Tracey ended up in the "Halfway House" and therefore faced the public vote.
Week 9	Exits	On Day 62, Chanelle walked from the house.; On Day 66, Shanessa and David were evicted from the house, receiving 38% and 37% of the public vote to evict, respectively.
Week 10	Tasks	For this week's task, housemates have to 'travel through time' and each complete mini-tasks.: On Day 68, Sam and Amanda had to decide whether they would become one housemate. As a result, they were automatically put up for eviction this week.; Kara-Louise and Brian had to battle against Big Brother 3's Alex and Adele for their task. They also had to put on a fashion show to win alcohol and music.
Week 10	Nominations	The housemates nominated for the tenth time. Amy, Jonty and Kara-Louise received the most nominations and faced the public vote with Amanda & Sam.
Week 10	Exits	On Day 73, Amy was evicted from the house, receiving 58% of the public vote to evict.
Week 11	Tasks	On Day 74, housemates were each given a word and had to think of as many synonyms for that word as possible. They passed the task.; The weekly task involved the housemates performing various tasks, with those who improve the most during the task being granted 'guru' status, whilst the others will all face eviction.; On Day 79, Big Brother took Gerry and Jonty's toy monkeys, Freddie (Gerry's) and Munkitty Tunkitty (Jonty's), on an around the world journey, during which they "wrote" postcards from around the world. The housemates had to guess where the monkeys had been. If they correctly guess, they win a speciality dish from that country or place.
Week 11	Punishments	For drawing symbols using eyeliner, Amanda, Sam, Gerry, Jonty and Kara had to do all the cooking and cleaning for the house.; Because Carole hid some biscuits in her drawer and the housemates ate them, knowing they were confiscated, as well as Carole whisking eggs, despite the new rule saying that the above housemates were the only ones who could do this, the luxury shopping budget was reduced to a basic budget.
Week 11	Nominations	This week no nominations took place. Instead, The 'guru's' (Amanda & Sam, Tracey and Ziggy) were all immune from eviction. Brian, Carole, Gerry, Jonty, Kara-Louise and Liam were nominated.
Week 11	Exits	On Day 80, Gerry was evicted from the house, after 'guru's' Amanda & Sam, Tracey and Ziggy, voted to evict him.
Week 12	Tasks	On Day 82, housemates were given the week's shopping task. For this week's shopping task, housemates had to attend Big Brother's Finishing Academy where they were taught how to speak and act properly.
Week 12	Punishments	Amanda, who had broken her twelfth microphone, had to talk through a loud hailer.
Week 12	Nominations	The housemates nominated for the eleventh and final time. Jonty, Kara-Louise and Tracey received the most nominations and faced the public vote.
Week 12	Exits	On Day 87, Tracey and Kara-Louise were evicted from the house, receiving 38.5% and 30.8% of the public vote to evict, respectively.
Week 13	Tasks	On Day 88, the six remaining housemates performed duets. Carole and Jonty performed Dolly Parton and Kenny Rogers's "Islands in the Stream", Liam and Ziggy performed Kylie Minogue and Jason Donovan's "Especially for You" and Amanda, Sam and Brian performed Katie Price and Peter Andre's "A Whole New World".; On Day 89, The housemates took part in the Big Big Brother Quiz, which was based on events that had happened during the series. During this task, ex-housemate Chanelle returned as a mystery guest, who Carole and Ziggy had to identify through touch alone.; On Day 90, The housemates had to design a task in pairs, the best of which would be carried out later in the day. Liam and Brian won this task.; On Day 91, the housemates had to create 'Big Brother: The Movie', and were given costumes, props and a video camera in order to recreate their time in the house.; On Day 92, Big Brother took the day off, and left the house in charge of one housemate. The housemate chosen to become Big Brother for the day was Jonty.
Week 13	Punishments	Carole, Liam, and Ziggy were punished for discussing nominations. Their punishment came on Day 90 when Big Brother called, Jonty, Brian and The Twins to the diary room to nominate two of the three of the housemates. They nominated Ziggy and Carole but Big Brother later revealed they were playing a joke on them.
Week 13	Exits	On Day 94, Jonty and Carole left the house in sixth and fifth place, Ziggy left the house in fourth place and Liam left the house in third place. It was then revealed that Brian was the winner, leaving Amanda & Sam as the runners-up.

== Production ==
=== Auditions ===
The first round of auditions started on 6 January 2007 at the SECC in Glasgow, where there was a queue of three hundred people.

=== Sponsorship ===
On 8 March 2007, it was announced that The Carphone Warehouse would not return to sponsor Big Brother 8 after cancelling its sponsorship of Celebrity Big Brother 5, and on 21 March, that Virgin Media would sponsor the show, for a reported £3 million. Virgin Media's idents for the show use footage from Big Brother programmes from all around the world, including Germany, Brazil, Philippines and the Netherlands.

=== Eye logo ===
The iconic Big Brother eye has been redesigned to what has been described as a "centrifugal inter-locking RGB rainbow test card" by its designer Daniel Eatock.

=== Broadcasts ===
On Channel 4, Davina McCall remained as main host of the live shows such as live launch, evictions, finale and other special shows where there may be a twist taking place. Marcus Bentley returned as narrator of the nightly highlight shows. For the first time since Big Brother 5 in 2004, there were no highlight shows broadcast on Saturday nights. In the early years of Big Brother, a live stream would feature on Channel E4, however this was omitted from the schedule until the final series (BB11-2010). Sunday night's highlight show would show just a short amount of footage from Friday, and would instead focus more on Saturday's events in the house.

McCall also hosted Big Brother: On the Couch, a psychology show broadcast on Sunday before the main show. It was similar to Big Brother's Big Brain, which was broadcast the previous year before being axed. It did not return in any subsequent series' of Big Brother.

Dermot O'Leary returned to host Big Brother's Little Brother. On 28 November 2007 he announced his departure from the show. His last presenting role was for the following Big Brother: Celebrity Hijack in January 2008.

Diary Room Uncut returned in the same time slot as the previous year. On Fridays, housemates would make podcasts.

Big Brother's Big Mouth returned in the same late night timeslot, however Russell Brand did not return, having quit the show earlier in the year. No permanent replacement was made and a different presenter/host took control each week.

==== Ofcom statement ====
Before the launch programme, Channel 4 presented a statement from Ofcom explaining the racism incidents from Celebrity Big Brother earlier in the year.

Summary of findings from Ofcom

In January 2007, Ofcom received over 44,500 complaints, mainly about potentially racist material.

Ofcom has concluded that Channel 4 failed to handle appropriately the strong content it was transmitting. This resulted in breaches of the Ofcom Broadcasting Code, which is designed to ensure that when broadcasters show potentially offensive material, they do so in a way which offers adequate protection to the viewer.

Ofcom has found that Channel 4 breached the Code on three separate occasions. Its decision to repeat one of these incidents in its early morning show resulted in a further breach for failing to protect children.

There was also a serious failure in Channel 4's compliance processes which meant that it was not aware of all the relevant activity in the House at a particularly critical time. This compounded its failure to ensure compliance with the Code.

These are significant failings. Ofcom has therefore imposed a formal sanction on Channel Four, directing it to broadcast this statement. This ensures that the largest number of viewers will be made fully aware of the seriousness of Channel 4's failure to comply.

— Ofcom

This was followed immediately by a Channel 4 ident, and then the Big Brother titles. Channel 4 also broadcast the Ofcom statement on the morning of 31 May 2007 before the early morning repeat, and again immediately before the first eviction on Friday 15 June.

=== House ===
It was initially believed that this would be the last series to be aired from the house in Elstree Studios, with a new house set to be built in Hammersmith for 2008, although, Endemol decided to renew the lease at its current location for another two years. The layout of the house remained much the same as the previous series, although the kitchen moved to the other side of the main living area. One big theme in the house was annoyance; the kitchen appliances were scattered around the house, with the oven and heat proof surface in the bedroom and the fridge in the garden. As further annoyance, the bathtub was placed in an open space right next to the main living room. Where the oven was in the bedroom was approximately where the kitchen area was located in Big Brother 7. The bedroom contained a single, double and triple bed as well as two four-person beds. Outside the bedroom window, in the main living area, is a lip shaped sofa that the presenters of the show refer to as "the lips". The house also contains a salon/bathroom, which houses two large hair dryers and two steam suits.

==== Garden ====
As well as the kitchen fridge, the garden contained a swimming pool, a seating area and, due to the smoking ban that came into effect in all public places during the series, a smoking area which housemates had to use from Day 1, even though the smoking ban didn't come into play until 1 July. This was checked by health officials, and deemed acceptable. The grass from the previous series has been replaced with AstroTurf. The garden was one of the smallest this year, in comparison to the garden in Big Brother 7. On Day 25 it was revealed that a caravan was hidden behind a garden wall. The caravan came with two single beds and sleeping bags. Brian and Charley went "on holiday" to the caravan for one night. The caravan was again accessible from day 36, this time any of the housemates were allowed to use the room. An extension to the pool was revealed on Day 67, along with a bar area. The area was hidden behind the "wet" sign in the garden. "The Insider" on BBLB revealed that there was a fully functioning washing machine hidden in the garden, throughout the show. Dermot O'Leary revealed this to the housemates during the BBLB reunion show. Because of the Big Brother 7 water shortage, the garden included a water tower, which at the beginning of the series was full. The water tower was located next to the fridge and the mangle.

==== Vestibule ====
Between the entrance/exit stairs and the main house was a vestibule area. This was used for several tasks, rewards and punishments, such as Ziggy's dating task, Amanda and Sam's birthday party, the punishments on Day 43, and the "Sin Bin" which is the room Charley was made to stay in while the rest of the housemates had their sin party.

==== Diary Room ====
A corridor was added between the Diary Room door and the main house which changes colour from red to blue to green when the "eye" button to open the door is pressed. The diary room chair was changed to a much larger see-through chair which contains white neon lights. For Big Brother: Celebrity Hijack, the lights inside the chair were coloured purple, to keep up with E4's theme. The diary room resides in almost the same place as last year, but set back a bit, making the living area larger. As in recent years, the diary room was used for several tasks. The Time Machine from Big Brother's time machine task was in the diary room. It was also used for the Seven Deadly Sins task.

=== Hidden rooms ===
The House contained a number of hidden rooms that were accessed either through the diary room or through a store room off the living area. At various points in the show, all or part of these rooms were opened up for various tasks and twists.

- One of these rooms was slept in by Thaila Zucchi, in her role as "Pauline", and it was Australia-themed and contained a kangaroo statue, a surfboard, plants and beanbags. The bedroom also contained the dossier from which "Pauline" could find out things about her housemates. Only "Pauline" was allowed in the room at that time.
- The rooms were later on used to house five 'halfway housemates' as part of a twist. It included a dormitory, common room, wash room and kitchenette as well as a small garden.

Periodically throughout the series, housemates conducted various tasks in some of these rooms.

- For the BBTV task, a newsroom was built, where two housemates transmitted news to the rest of the house, such as messages from home. The rooms were also used as a studio for a gameshow and later a talent show.
- It was used as a "The Happy Room" to cheer up Charley and Billi, who were instructed to wear "happy" t-shirts and baseball caps for the duration of their stay. The room was full of red beanbags, and featured cheery slogans on the walls. While in the room, Big Brother played the tune, If You're Happy and You Know It.
- During the seven deadly sins task, it was turned into "The Room of Nicky" and contained pictures, books and footage of Nicky and also a sofa with cushions spelling N-I-C-K-Y. Nicky was instructed to stay in the room and learn to appreciate herself until Big Brother allowed her to leave.
- For Big Brother's birthday task, a Practice Room was built, where the entertainers had to practice. A party room was then provided with a ball pool, small stage, and an area for food. Amanda and Sam, Gerry, Nicky, and Ziggy were chosen as the party guests. Carole's job was the face painter. Chanelle and Liam performed magic. Charley and Tracey were clowns. Brian was the final musical performer.

==== Halfway House ====
On Day 59, five new housemates Amy, Jonty, Shanessa, David and Kara entered the house and were told they would live in the Halfway House which was reached by going through the store room or through the diary room and down a corridor. The Halfway Housemates and ordinary house mates were swapped around for different reasons. Day 59 Amy, David, Jonty, Kara and Shanessa enter the Halfway House. David visits the main house. Day 60 In the morning Amy visits the main house, followed by Jonty in the afternoon. Day 61 In the morning Shanessa visits the main house, followed by Kara in the afternoon. Day 62 Housemates in the main house choose David and Kara to enter the house swapped with Ziggy. Day 63 The Halfway Housemates have a task called Jack in a box to win a place in the main house. Shanessa won and was swapped with Liam who Shanessa chose. Day 64 The four Halfway housemates had to choose to swap with four housemates in the main house they chose David, Kara, Shanessa and Tracey who moved in halfway house and were automatically faced eviction. Day 65 The halfway housemates are given a last night to go into the main house for a few hours. Day 66 The first halfway housemate to be evicted is Shanessa, the second is David. Then Kara and Tracey re-enter the main house for good.

== Ratings ==
Official ratings are taken from BARB.

	Week 1		Week 2	Week 3	Week 4	Week 5	Week 6	Week 7	Week 8	Week 9	Week 10	Week 11	Week 12	Week 13
Sun	No show	3.79	2.85	3.34	3.6	2.43	3.66	3.79	3.44	3.77	3.53	3.33	3.52	2.75
Mon	No show	4.4	2.73	3.68	3.38	3.69	3.99	3.73	3.43	3.88	3.33	3.31	3.29	2.93
Tue	No show	4.35	4.2	3.97	4.01	4.15	4.28	3.39	3.68	4.14	3.53	3.33	3.27	3.2
Wed	6.59	4.4	2.31	3.31/4.04	4.14	3.93	3.85	3.92	3.46	3.77	3.82	3.47	2.84	3.53
Thu	4.26	5.06	2.79	3.9	3.94	3.74	3.5	3.87	3.72	3.93	3.5	3.91	3.6	3.56
Fri	3.5	4.3	3.27	3.99	3.71	4.26	4.94	4.26	4.57	3.86	3.81	4.21	3.96	5.42
Fri	5.02	4.89	3.34	4.09	3.9	4.59	5.99	4.29	5.28	3.78	4.04	4.3	3.85	5.6
Weekly average	4.6		3.07	3.79	3.81	3.83	4.32	3.89	3.94	3.88	3.65	3.69	3.48	3.86
Running average	4.6		4	3.82	3.82	3.82	3.90	3.90	3.91	3.90	3.89	3.86	3.83	3.83
Series average	3.83													

== Criticism and controversy ==
=== Racist language ===
Nine days into the series, Channel 4 was criticised for deciding to air the word "nigger" on their daily highlights show. After the criticism they received for not handling the Celebrity Big Brother racism allegations properly back in January, they were quick to intervene after Emily used the word in conversation with Charley. On the other hand, Charley and Nicky subsequently used the same contentious word several times, in reference to Emily's use. No action was seen to be taken against them. After Emily's disqualification from the competition was announced, 922 viewers complained to Ofcom, the British television regulator, believing that it was unfair. Another 270 people expressed dissatisfaction with Channel 4's decision to air the word "nigger" uncensored. Parr was invited on BBLB, which also caused disturbances, but postponed her appearance. The press and Dermot presumed she postponed due to the controversy, but as she revealed in her BBLB interview, it was not.

Furthermore, on Day 40, Channel 4 confirmed that Charley had been called to the Diary Room and reprimanded after using the word "nigger" twice on one night. This was not broadcast on the nightly highlights programme or the live feed, further inflaming rumours about favouritism towards Charley. A Big Brother spokesperson claimed "Charley used the N-word as a black woman to refer to another black person. We judged her use of the term different from Emily's. But Big Brother called her to the Diary Room to remind her that this word could cause offence."

On Day 93, Ziggy was also reprimanded by Big Brother for using the word "nigger" in reference to a 50 Cent song while playing a drinking game in the garden. He was called to the Diary Room, and was warned with an immediate ejection if he were to continue using the language. Upon his exit from the Diary Room, he apologised to Brian, who was present when he said the word, which he accepted. A spokesperson stated: "Channel 4 acted swiftly and appropriately to tell Ziggy that racially offensive language would not be tolerated under any circumstances. Ziggy was told that any further transgression would mean his immediate eviction. We gave careful consideration to the context of Ziggy's offence. Ziggy was repeating a lyric from a song and his words were not directed at anyone. Nobody in the house was offended and the incident was not broadcast, so no offence was caused to viewers."
