= Chanelle Hayes =

British adult content creator and model (born 1987)

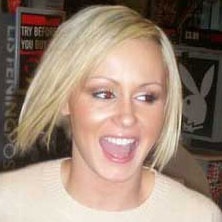
- Hayes in 2007
- Born: Chanelle Jade Sinclair; November 11, 1987 (age 39); Wythenshawe, Manchester, England
- Occupations: Content creator; model
- Years active: 2007–present
- Spouse: Dan Bingham (m. 2024)
- Partners: Ziggy Lichman (2007); Matthew Bates (2009–2010)
- Children: 2

Chanelle Jade Hayes (née Sinclair; born 11 November 1987) is a British content creator, model and reality television personality. She is best known for her appearance on the eighth series of the Channel 4 reality television series Big Brother UK in 2007.

== Early life ==
Hayes was born Chanelle Jade Sinclair in 1987, in Wythenshawe, Manchester, England. Her mother, Andrea Sinclair, was a 32-year-old prostitute who was murdered by a client named Keith Pollard on 5 April 1988, when Hayes was not quite five months old. Hayes was then put up for adoption and was brought up in Wakefield, West Yorkshire by adoptive parents, Christine and Harry Hayes.

== Television career ==
In 2007, Hayes was a housemate on the eighth series of Big Brother UK. During her time on the show she was involved in a relationship with fellow housemate, Ziggy Lichman, splitting up and getting back together multiple times during the show. She also infamously feuded with fellow housemate, Charley Uchea, throughout the series. During a task on the show each housemate underwent an IQ test, Hayes had one of the highest in the house, scoring 114. On Day 61, Hayes left the house and re-entered after consulting a psychologist. She officially quit the show at her own request on Day 62. She re-entered the house for a few minutes on Day 89, as part of a task.

In November 2007, it was revealed Hayes was voted the "Favourite Big Brother Housemate Ever" by the members of online forum Digital Spy. She was also voted the second "Sexiest Female Housemate Ever" losing to Big Brother UK series 7 housemate, Imogen Thomas. Shortly after appearing on Big Brother she released her own perfume range named "Mwah...".

In 2008, Hayes began writing a Big Brother UK column for the Daily Star, sharing her views on Big Brother UK series 9. She made a guest appearance on the Big Brother special of The Friday Night Project. She also appeared in advertisements for MTV UK's comedy, Fur TV. In 2009, she appeared as an audience member alongside many other ex-housemates in E4's special, Big Brother's Big Quiz.

In 2007, Hayes was an official judge in the short lived VH1 UK show, Wannabe. In which Hayes alongside the other judges put together a band of 25+ year old girls for a live concert. She also starred in her own reality television show for VH1 UK, titled; Wannabe: Popstar. The show premiered in April 2008, and followed her progress in making a debut single and music video. The show was put on hold and eventually cancelled by VH1 UK, she responded that her "fame" may be over. In May 2008, she topped a poll by Domino's Pizza, to find Britain's least talented celebrity. Later in 2008, she was featured in the BBC2 documentary by Griff Rhys Jones, Losing It-Griff Rhys Jones on Anger, where she discussed her issues with anger management.

Hayes went on to make various other television appearances including on; Celebrity Scissorhands, Loose Women, Ready Steady Cook, The Big Questions, This Morning and Totally Calum Best: The Best is Yet to Come. In March 2009, she was a guest panelist on Celebrity Juice and returned for an episode as a regular guest in 2011.

== Other ventures ==
=== Modeling ===
After her appearance on Big Brother UK, Hayes began to regularly appear on the cover of magazines including Nuts and Zoo. She began co-presenting live on Nuts TV alongside O.J. Borg, but stopped presenting on the channel to focus on her music career. She also appeared in a photoshoot for Playboy Plus. She released calendars in 2008, 2009, 2010 and 2014, with her 2008 calendar being the fourth best seller of the year.

She became the lead model for Diva Corsets, appearing regularly promoting the, Michelle for George, lingerie line. In 2009, she was the promotional model for the Nintendo Wii video game, MadWorld.

=== Music ===
Hayes signed with Eminence Records in mid 2008. She released her first single "I Want It" in 2008, which premiered alongside its music video on MTV UK. The song entered the official UK Singles Chart at No. 63. Ministry of Sound released a remix of the single in late 2008. The Ministry of Sound remix of the song reached top 10 in various dance club charts, peaking at No.2 in the UK Pop Club Charts in April, 2008. Hayes later discussed the possibility of recording a debut album.

In May 2008, BBC Radio 1 declined to add her debut single to the playlist, despite interviewing her on the Chris Moyles breakfast show. In August 2008, the event organisers of V Festival reportedly declined her request to perform.

Hayes went on to sign with the American record label; Next Plateau Entertainment, which was affiliated with Universal Republic Records. Her single "I Want It" was distributed across three promotional CDs.

The Ministry of Sound remix of "I Want It" was added to Dance Dance Revolution Encore arcade machines in 2009.

== Personal life ==
Hayes has a son with footballer, Matthew Bates and another son with her husband Ryan Oates, whom she married in 2024. She released an autobiography titled, Baring My Heart, in 2014.

In 2011, she opened a cake making business in Wakefield. In 2021, she had gastric sleeve surgery after gaining 9 stone due to food addiction. In 2024, she graduated from University and began working as a qualified nurse, but quit a year later to join OnlyFans.

== Filmography ==
Television
Year	Title	Role	Notes
2007	Big Brother UK series 8	Self; housemate	13th place, 67 episodes
2007	Big Brother Uncut	Self; housemate	17 episodes
2007-2008	Big Brother's Little Brother	Self; ex-housemate	6 episodes
2007	Screenwipe	Self; guest	1 episode
2007	Ready Steady Cook	Self; contestant	1 episode
2007	Wannabe	Self; judge	6 episodes
2007	The Most Annoying People of 2007	Self; feature	TV special
2008	Nuts TV	Self; presenter	Recurring role
2008	Fur TV	Self; guest	Advertisement
2008	Chanelle: Wannabe Popstar	Self; cast member	6 episodes
2008	The Friday Night Project	Self; guest	1 episode
2008	How TV Changed Britain	Self; commentator	TV special
2008	50 Ways to Leave Your TV Lover	Self; commentator	TV special
2008	Totally Calum Best: The Best is Yet to Come	Self; guest	1 episode
2008	The Most Annoying Couples We Love to Hate	Self; feature	TV special
2008	Losing It: Griff Rhys Jones on Anger	Self; feature	Documentary
2008	Celebrity Scissorhands series 3	Self; guest	1 episode
2009	The Big Questions	Self; feature	1 episode
2009-2011	Celebrity Juice	Self; panelist	2 episodes
2009	Big Brother's Big Quiz	Self; audience member	TV special
2014-2019	This Morning	Self; guest	2 episodes
2016-2021	Loose Women	Self; guest	7 episodes
2024	OK! TV	Self; bride	Web series, 1 episode
2024	Rob Beckett's Smart TV	Self; guest	1 episode

Video games
Year	Title	Role	Notes
2009	Dance Dance Revolution Encore	Music artist	

== Discography ==
Singles
Year	Title	Chart Position	Album
2008	"I Want It"	No. 63.	Non-album single
