= Ziggy Lichman =

British television personality

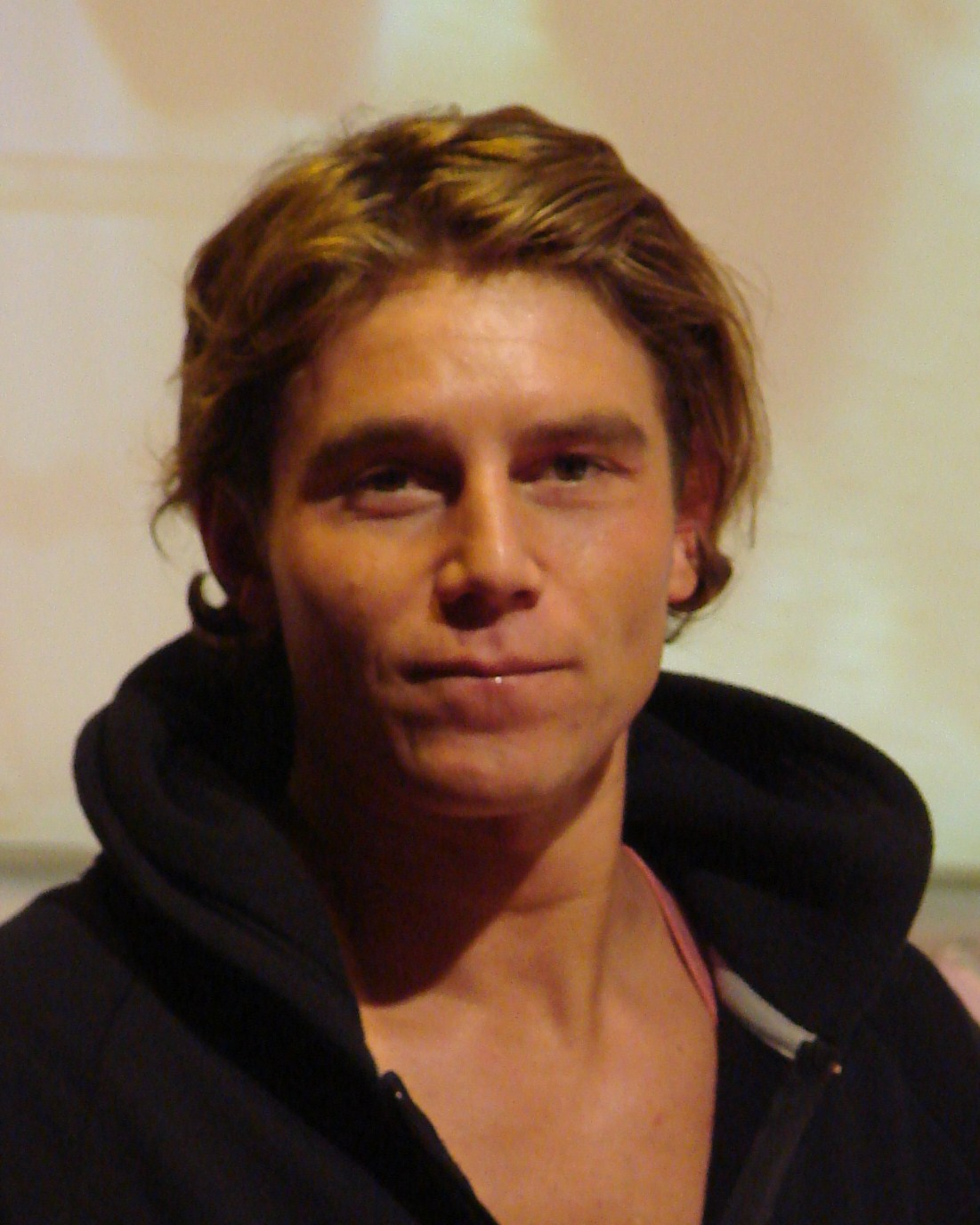
- Lichman in 2007
- Born: Zachary Sami P. Lichman; 5 January 1981 (age 45); Camden, London, England
- Education: University College School, London; The Haberdashers' Aske's Boys' School, Hertfordshire
- Television: Big Brother 8

Zachary Sami Lichman (born 5 January 1981) is a former member of the boy band Northern Line (1998–2000) and reality TV contestant, having appeared in the 8th series of the UK edition of Big Brother.

== Early life and education ==
Lichman grew up in a secular Jewish family in Totteridge. He was educated at two senior independent schools: at University College School in Hampstead in north west London, and Aldenham School, In Elstree in Hertfordshire.

== Career ==
Lichman has appeared as a contestant on television shows such as Five Go Dating on E4 and the 2007 edition of Big Brother in the United Kingdom. He was the first male to enter the house after an all-female launch on Day 3. He is commonly remembered for his on-again off-again relationship with fellow housemate Chanelle Hayes.

He was the only housemate allowed to nominate in Week 1, in which he nominated Emily Parr and Shabnam Paryani, with this eviction later being cancelled due to Emily's ejection from the house on Day 9.

During his time in the house, he never faced the public vote across the entire 13 weeks, and finished in fourth place on Day 94, with 15.3% of the public vote to win.

As of 2017, Lichman was working at Paper Soho and overseeing Favela Rocks in Knightsbridge.

With Lucien Laviscount, Lichman opened two Kensal Rise joints: The Shop NW10, a cocktail bar and café, in 2018 and The Wealthy Beggar, a dive bar with food from Gareth Drew, in 2022.

Laviscount and Lichman spearheaded a homelessness awareness campaign A Deed A Day with radio presenter Rio Fredrika and model Ana Tanaka. For Christmas 2018, the group ran a soup kitchen out of Laviscount and Lichman's The Shop NW10.
