= OK! =

British magazine

- 12 January 2016 cover
- Categories: Celebrity
- Frequency: Weekly
- Publisher: Reach plc
- First issue: April 1993; 33 years ago
- Country: United Kingdom
- Website: www.ok.co.uk

OK! is a British weekly magazine that primarily specialises in royal and celebrity news. It is owned by Reach plc. Originally launched as a monthly magazine, its first issue was published in April 1993. In September 2004, OK! launched in Australia as a monthly title – the magazine went weekly in October 2006. In 2005, an American version was launched, followed by an Indian edition in May 2006, a Spanish-language version in Mexico in 2006, a Bulgarian-language version in 2007 and a Spanish edition in 2008.

== OK! global distribution ==
=== OK! USA ===
In 2011, American Media Inc. bought OK! USA from Northern & Shell. In 2017, former editor James Heidenry stepped down, and was replaced by James Robertson. The Chief Content Editor of American Media, Dylan Howard, oversees the publication.

=== Other locations ===
OK! is the world's biggest celebrity lifestyle magazine, with more than 30 million readers worldwide, and now appears in 20 countries (Australia (readership of 158th as of June 2018), Austria, Azerbaijan, Bulgaria, China, Cyprus, Czech Republic, Germany, Greece, India, Indonesia, Ireland, Japan, Latvia, Malaysia, Mexico, Middle East, Mongolia, Pakistan, Romania, Russia, Slovakia, Slovenia, South Africa, Switzerland, Thailand, Turkey, Ukraine, the UK, the US, Venezuela and Vietnam).

OK!'s Australian edition was published by Bauer Media Australia and New Zealand. In July 2020, Bauer Media's Australian and New Zealand operations were acquired by the Sydney investment firm Mercury Capital, which cancelled the magazine due to declining advertising revenue and travel restrictions caused by the COVID-19 pandemic.

== Weddings ==
OK! is best known for its coverage of celebrity nuptials.

In 2000, OK! had exclusive rights to publish photographs of the wedding of Catherine Zeta-Jones and Michael Douglas, but its rival Hello! magazine published pictures as well, and OK! sued. It was awarded £1,033,156 in an initial judgment, but lost it on appeal.

In October 2005, three celebrity weddings took place on the same day: those of Katie Price and Peter Andre, Kate Garraway and Derek Draper, and Samia Ghadie and property developer Matthew Smith. OK! covered them all over separate issues. The biggest wedding of the three (Price and Andre) was covered over two bumper issues.

The same happened for the wedding of Ashley and Cheryl Cole, as well as Christina Aguilera's. OK! devoted an issue to photos of Tony Parker and Eva Longoria's wedding.

Other weddings covered by OK! include:

- Natasha Hamilton and Riad Erraji (November 2007)
- Kerry Katona and Mark Croft (February 2007)
- Holly Willoughby and Dan Baldwin (August 2007)
- Steven Gerrard and Alex Curran (June 2007)
- John Terry and Toni Poole (June 2007)
- Kym Marsh and Jack Ryder (August 2002)
- Melanie Brown and Jimmy Gulzar (September 1998)
- Wayne Rooney and Coleen McLoughlin (June 2008)
- Jack Tweed and Jade Goody (February 2009)
- Patsy Kensit and Jeremy Healy (April 2009)
- Kian Egan and Jodi Albert (May 2009)
- Samantha Janus and Mark Womack (May 2009)
- Hilary Duff and Mike Comrie (August 2010)
- Prince William and Catherine Middleton (April 2011)
- Tom Fletcher and Giovanna Falcone (May 2012)
- Victoria Adams and David Beckham (July 1999)

== Controversies ==
Prior to Jade Goody's cancer-related death in March 2009, OK! sparked controversy by publishing an "Official Tribute Issue" with the front-page captions "In Loving Memory" and "1981–2009," even though Goody was still alive when the issue went to press.

In June 2009, OK! ran another tribute issue, this time for Michael Jackson. The publication had paid a reported $500,000 for images of Jackson's body being retrieved after his death. The cover photo showed a deceased Jackson on a stretcher, in a neck brace and with an oxygen mask. "It’s a photo that captures the surprise and the upset and the moment of this breaking news story," Sarah Ivens, the magazine's editorial director, said. "I hope the cover will provoke readers."

In 2010, the magazine faced more criticism after running a cover story on Kourtney Kardashian's pregnancy. It published a cover photo of Kardashian holding her son, Mason, and claimed to feature an exclusive interview revealing the secrets to her weight loss. Kardashian tweeted in response, "One of those weeklies got it wrong again…they didn't have an exclusive with me. And I gained 40 pounds [18 kg] while pregs, not 26 [12 kg]…But thanks!" She also alleged that the body on the cover was not hers, and that OK! had Photoshopped her face onto someone else's body.

OK! was criticised again in July 2013 when it published an issue featuring Catherine, Duchess of Cambridge on the same day she left the hospital after giving birth to Prince George. The front cover of the 30 July issue advertised "Kate's Post-Baby Weight Loss Regime" [sic] and an "exclusive interview" with Catherine's trainer, who claimed that "[Kate's] stomach will shrink straight back" to its previous size. On Twitter the English TV presenter Katy Hill tweeted a photo of her own postnatal body and urged fellow mothers to boycott the magazine.

Hill gained support from other women who believed that the story had been posted too soon after Catherine gave birth and felt that OK! was "pressuring new moms to instantly lose the baby weight." The magazine's parent company, Northern & Shell, later issued an apology in a statement published in The Guardian: "Kate is one of the great beauties of our age and OK! readers love her. Like the rest of the world, we were very moved by her radiance as she and William introduced the Prince of Cambridge to the world. We would not dream of being critical of her appearance. If that was misunderstood on our cover it was not intended."

== Other media ==
OK! TV was an early-evening magazine program broadcast on Channel 5 as a brand extension of OK! Magazine. It replaced Live from Studio Five in February 2011 and was presented by Jenny Frost and Jeff Brazier, who replaced Kate Walsh and Matt Johnson in August 2011. An American version of OK! TV aired from 2013 to 2016.

OK! Insider is a weekly video podcast about the current issue of the magazine. It is written and presented by Layla Anna-Lee and Lizzie Cundy and produced by Simon Withington and is available on the OK! UK website.

== Editors ==
1995: Richard Barber
1998: Sharon Ring
1999: Martin Townsend
2002: Nic McCarthy
2004: Lisa Byrne
2012: Christian Guiltenane
2013: Kirsty Tyler
2019: Charlotte Seligman
2020-2025 : Caroline Waterston
2025 to date: Chloe Hubbard
