= Melinda Messenger =

English television presenter, model (born 1971)

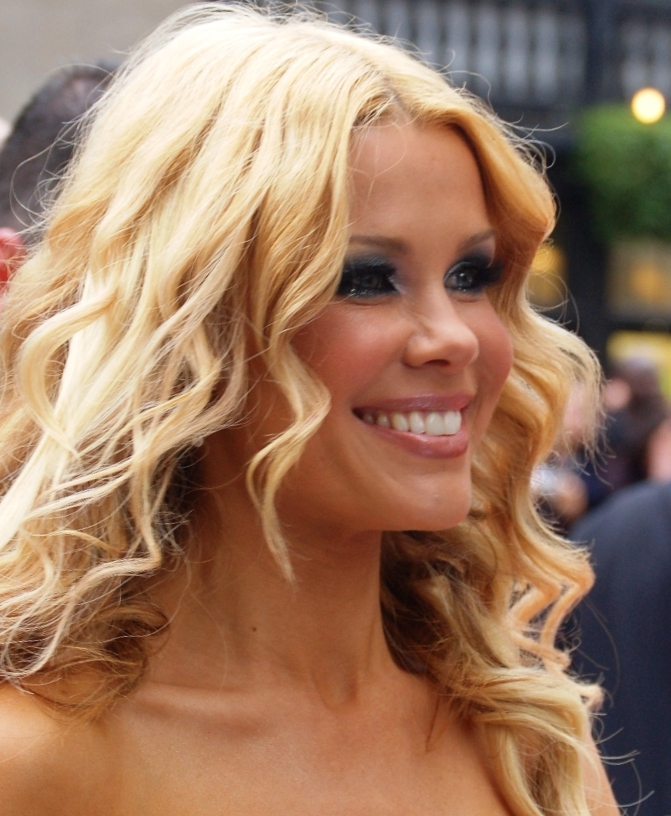
- Messenger in 2008
- Born: Melinda Jane Messenger; 23 February 1971 (age 55); Swindon, Wiltshire, England
- Occupations: Presenter; former glamour model
- Years active: 1997–present
- Television: Eurotrash; Fort Boyard; Celebrity Big Brother; Live from Studio Five
- Spouse: Wayne Roberts (m. 1998–2012)
- Children: 3

Melinda Jane Messenger (born 23 February 1971) is an English television presenter and former glamour model and Page Three girl. She presented the magazine programme Live from Studio Five and was formerly the co-presenter of the reality show Cowboy Builders.

== Early life ==
Messenger was born on 23 February 1971 in Swindon, Wiltshire. After attending different schools, one of which was Dorcan Technology College, she spent six months working as a flight attendant for Britannia Airways. She then joined a local marketing company and rose to become customer services manager, overseeing a staff of 50 employees.

== Career ==
=== Modelling ===
Messenger decided to become a model, and was advised by the Jason Paul Modelling Agency to enhance her breasts, which she enlarged from a 34C to a 34DD cup. She then took a job modelling for a Gloucester-based double glazing company, Glevum, dressed only in lingerie. As part of an advertising campaign called "Class Behind Glass", the posters quickly began disappearing from bus stops, having been taken by locals. After a complaint at the lack of clothes on Messenger, the Advertising Standards Authority banned the campaign, claiming they were not sufficiently "classy".

After local newspapers reported on this, the Daily Star ran the story on 28 January 1997 as a photo-shoot of Messenger, under the headline "Move Over Eva Herzigova".

Signed by modelling agent Yvonne Paul, who had represented Samantha Fox in the 1980s, Messenger's career accelerated. She posed for designers including Vivienne Westwood, then appeared on The Sun newspaper's Page Three; the publication later promoted Messenger as the "Girl of the Thrillenium!" Her work for the newspaper entailed visiting the Spanish coasts and English seaside resorts, an assignment known as "Mel's Big Bus Tour".

=== Acting ===
Messenger appeared in a cameo role in 1999's Virtual Sexuality as Superbra Girl, and costarred in the 2000 cult film The Mumbo Jumbo in the role of Princess Vanilla. She worked on Channel 4 cult show Eurotrash and became a popular pantomime actress, taking on roles such as Cinderella (2004–2005) and Aladdin (with Bobby Davro and John Rhys-Davies; Woking – 2005–2006).

=== Motherhood and becoming a presenter ===
Following the birth of her first child on 7 April 2000, by emergency caesarian section after she collapsed with pre-eclampsia, Messenger concentrated on developing her career as a television presenter.

Messenger released her Back into Shape Workout DVD, which was a six-week fitness programme designed to help new mothers recover their fitness. She appeared on Noel Edmonds – Gotcha! in which she was one of the subjects to receive the treatment from Noel and his team.

Messenger had her own issue of At Home With... magazine called "At Home With Melinda Messenger", which was aimed at parents. She joined with chef Antony Worrall Thompson in May 2008 and contributed some recipes for the cookbook The Sweet Life.

=== Presenting ===
Messenger's TV career began in 1997 on Channel 4's Eurotrash, where she featured as a "roving reporter" in erotic scenarios, including modelling fetish wear and acting as a nude magician's assistant.

==== Hosting and presenting ====
In 1998–99 she hosted her own show on Channel 5 called Melinda's Big Night In.

From 1998 to 2001, Messenger presented the Channel 5 game show Fort Boyard, which ran for four series. She joined ex-EastEnders star Leslie Grantham and Catweazle star Geoffrey Bayldon in the game show which tested contestants' physical agility and brainpower on the sea fortress in France.

In 1999, Messenger presented the game show Beat the Crusher with Freddie Starr.

She has since presented many TV programmes, including Loose Lips (with Richard Arnold), Baby Baby, Can We Still Be Friends, and Beat the Dealer.

In 2008, Messenger presented as host on programmes including the BBC's To Buy or Not to Buy, ITV's Bingo Night Live, and A Garden For Eden for ITV Westcountry.

Messenger's show Cowboy Builders started on Five on 8 January 2009, co-presented with Dominic Littlewood.

In 2009, Messenger, along with ex-footballer Ian Wright and The Apprentice runner-up Kate Walsh, began presenting a new show on Five called Live from Studio Five. It was announced on 29 January 2010 that Messenger was leaving her role on Live from Studio Five, to focus on other projects. Her last show was on 26 February and she was replaced by a series of guest hosts. The show was cancelled in February 2011.

She hosted The Health Lottery Draws on ITV and Channel 5 between 2011 and 2012.

==== Contestant ====
In 2002, she appeared on Celebrity Big Brother.

In 2004, she appeared on the "Age Swap" episode of Celebrity Swap as 83-year-old Margaret Doyle, supposedly Melinda's old ballet teacher, disguised with prosthetic make-up, a black lycra suit, a red-white wig and fake teeth.

Melinda was a contestant in the fourth series of Dancing on Ice, which began on 11 January 2009. She was eliminated in the seventh week after losing a surprise skate-off against Jessica Taylor. She had survived three previous skate-offs.

In September 2023, Channel 4 announced Messenger as one of the contestants on Celebrity SAS: Who Dares Wins.

==== Other ====
She did a voiceover for a viewer competition for ITV's Golden Balls series 3-6 between 2008 and 2009.

=== Psychotherapist ===
After leaving regular television work, Messenger undertook training in psychotherapy and has practised since 2015.

== Personal life ==
Having dated since they met at his local Swansea nightclub, Messenger married Wayne Roberts in Bali, Indonesia, on 26 November 1998. The couple have three children. Though Messenger expressed a desire for a large family, she decided not to have more children after suffering from post-natal depression after the births of her second and third children. In 2003, Messenger won Quality Street "Celebrity Mum of the Year" award. It was confirmed through her agent that the couple had separated amicably in 2008. They divorced in 2012.
