= The Apprentice 4 =

The Apprentice 4 can refer to:

- The Apprentice (UK Series 4)
- The Apprentice (US Season 4)
