= The Apprentice 5 =

The Apprentice 5 can refer to:

- The Apprentice (UK Series Five)
- The Apprentice (US Season 5)
