= Fishy Business =

Fishy Business may refer to:

- "Fishy Business" (The Apprentice), a 2008 reality television episode
- "Fishy Business" (Courage the Cowardly Dog), an episode of the cartoon television series
- Fishy Business: Salmon, Biology, and the Social Construction of Nature, a book by Rik Scarce on sociology concerning the human social view of what constitutes nature (using examples from biology and salmon habitats in particular)
