= Ian Wright =

English footballer and pundit (born 1963)

Ian Wright OBE
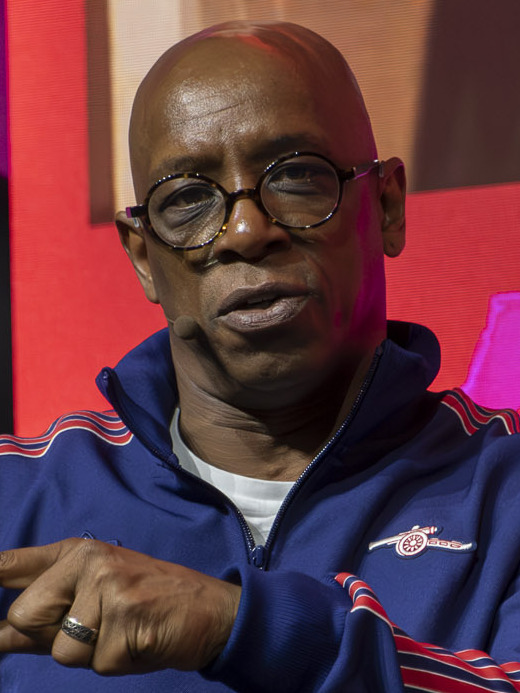
- Wright in 2025

Personal information
- Birth name: Ian Edward Wright
- Date of birth: 3 November 1963 (age 63)
- Place of birth: Woolwich, London, England
- Height: 5 ft 9 in (1.75 m)
- Position: Forward

Senior career*
Years	Team	Apps	(Gls)
1985	Greenwich Borough		
1985–1991	Crystal Palace	225	(90)
1991–1998	Arsenal	221	(128)
1998–1999	West Ham United	22	(9)
1999	→ Nottingham Forest (loan)	10	(5)
1999–2000	Celtic	8	(3)
2000	Burnley	15	(4)
Total		501	(239)

International career
1989–1992	England B	3	(0)
1991–1998	England	33	(9)
- * Club domestic league appearances and goals

Ian Edward Wright (born 3 November 1963) is an English media personality and former professional footballer.

Wright enjoyed success with London clubs Crystal Palace and Arsenal as a forward, spending six years with the former and seven years with the latter. With Arsenal he lifted the Premier League title, both the major domestic cup competitions, and the European Cup Winners Cup. Known for his speed, agility, finishing and aggression, he played 581 league games, scoring 287 goals for seven clubs in Scotland and England, while also earning 33 caps for the England national team, and scoring nine international goals.

Wright also played in the Premier League for West Ham United, the Scottish Premier League for Celtic and the Football League for Burnley and Nottingham Forest. As of 2025, he is Arsenal's second-highest scorer of all time and Crystal Palace's third-highest.

Wright has been active in the media following his retirement, usually in football-related TV and radio shows. Two of his sons, Bradley and Shaun, are retired professional footballers. Wright is also a well-known advocate for women's football, especially for Arsenal's women's team.

In 2025, Wright was named as the UK's second-most influential black person in the 2026 Powerlist.

== Early life ==
Ian Edward Wright was born to Jamaican parents in the Woolwich area of London on 3 November 1963. He grew up in Brockley. He has two older brothers. His father was absent and he was brought up by his mother, Nesta, and a stepfather who was abusive. He is a cousin of fellow footballer Jermaine Wright and actor Patrick Robinson.

Wright came to professional football relatively late. Despite having had trials at Southend United and Brighton & Hove Albion during his teens, he was unable to attract sufficient interest to win a professional contract offer. Reverting to playing for amateur and non-League teams, he was left disillusioned about his chances of a career as a professional footballer. After a spell of poverty during which his wife was expecting their first child, Wright spent 32 days in Chelmsford Prison for failing to pay fines for driving without tax or insurance. He recalls that after being locked in the cell, he burst into tears and vowed to God to do everything in his power to make it as a footballer.

Wright described his school teacher Sydney Pigden, who taught him to read and write, as "the first positive male figure" in his life. Having been incorrectly told that Pigden had died and believing it for many years, Wright and his former mentor were reunited in a 2005 episode of the BBC series With a Little Help From My Friends, with the clip of Wright crying and hugging Pigden often going viral years later. Growing up, Wright had an affinity for several London clubs. In his autobiography, he describes Millwall as "the first football team [he] fell in love with" and writes that he "genuinely had loved West Ham" since he was young, with their kit being the first he owned. He also had an early connection with Arsenal as he was close friends with club legend David Rocastle.

== Club career ==
=== Amateur and semi-professional ===
From being a teenager, until the age of 21, Wright played for Lewisham-based amateur Sunday league club Ten-em-Bee (a club his sons Bradley and Shaun also later played for) becoming the top scorer in the London and Kent Border Sunday League. In 1985 Wright was signed by semi-professional Greenwich Borough and got paid £30 a week (equivalent to £93 in 2025).

=== Crystal Palace ===
After a season at Greenwich, Wright was spotted by a Crystal Palace scout after a tip-off from Dulwich Hamlet manager Billy Smith and was invited for a trial at Selhurst Park. Having impressed then-manager Steve Coppell, he signed a professional contract with Palace in August 1985, just three months short of his 22nd birthday.

He quickly made his mark in his first season, scoring nine goals to finish as Palace's second-highest scorer. When Mark Bright arrived on the Palace scene the following year the duo soon established a successful striking partnership and it was largely their goals which took the club back to the top flight via the playoffs in 1989. Wright was particularly instrumental that season, scoring 24 goals in the Second Division and a total of 33 in all competitions.

Wright was called up for England B duty in December 1989 but a twice-cracked shin bone reduced his initial impact in the First Division. However, after recovering from the injury he made a dramatic appearance as a 'super-sub', in the 1990 FA Cup Final against Manchester United. He equalised for Palace a few minutes after coming onto the field forcing extra time, then putting them ahead in extra time. The eventual score was 3–3, but Palace lost the replay 1–0.

The next season, he gained full international honours, and reached a hundred goals for Crystal Palace, as the club finished in their highest ever league position of third place in the top flight. He also scored twice as Palace beat Everton to win the Full Members Cup at Wembley. Wright became renowned for his deadly striking ability, as shown when he scored a hat-trick in just eighteen minutes in Palace's penultimate game of the 1990–91 season away to Wimbledon.

Wright scored 117 goals in 253 starts and 24 substitute appearances over six seasons for The Eagles in all competitions, making him the club's record post-war goalscorer and third on the all-time list. In 2005, he was voted into their Centenary XI and was named as their "Player of The Century". In December 2023, during an appearance on The Overlap YouTube channel hosted by Gary Neville, Wright revealed he was bullied by teammate Jim Cannon until Cannon's departure from the club in 1988. Wright voiced his experiences with Cannon at the time to Coppell, which included Cannon berating Wright for eating communal food and Cannon "two-foot jumping [Wright]" in the back after he scored past Cannon during a training session. Cannon later disputed parts of Wright's account but admitted to giving him "a little slap".

=== Arsenal ===
Wright signed for Arsenal in September 1991 for £2.5 million, which at the time was a club record fee. He scored on his debut against Leicester City in a League Cup tie, produced a hat-trick on his league debut against Southampton, and in the final match of the season, scored another hat-trick against the Saints to take his total to 31 goals in all competitions. Wright's 29 league goals (24 for Arsenal, 5 for Palace) were enough to make him the league's top scorer. As of 2016–17, only Wright and Teddy Sheringham have led the top-flight scoring charts having scored for two clubs during the season in question.

Wright went on to be the club's top scorer for six seasons in a row. He played a major part in the club's success during the 1990s, winning an FA Cup and League Cup double in 1993; scoring in both the FA Cup Final itself and the replay against Sheffield Wednesday. Wright also helped Arsenal reach the 1994 European Cup Winners' Cup Final, although he was suspended for the final in which Arsenal beat Parma 1–0.

Behind every great goalkeeper there's a ball from Ian Wright.

— Nike slogan which appeared on billboards throughout England in the mid 1990s.

Wright scored in every round but the final of Arsenal's 1995 Cup Winners' Cup runners-up campaign, and scored freely in the Premier League, but it was a difficult time for Arsenal following the dismissal of manager George Graham over illegal payments, and under caretaker Stewart Houston they could only manage a 12th-place finish in the league.

The arrival of Bruce Rioch led to a bleaker time; the two did not get on, resulting in heated arguments in training, with Rioch berating Wright at half-time of a 5–0 pre-season victory over St Albans City (in which Wright scored). It caused Wright to hand in a transfer request, which he later retracted. The arrival of Dennis Bergkamp brought a brief but fruitful striking partnership: in their first season together, they helped Arsenal finish fifth in the league and qualify for the UEFA Cup. They also reached the League Cup semi-finals, which they lost on away goals to eventual winners Aston Villa.

By the time Arsène Wenger arrived at Arsenal in September 1996, Wright was nearly 33. Despite his age, he continued to score regularly, and was the second-highest Premier League scorer in the 1996–97 season with 23 goals. That season he also set a record by scoring against 17 of Arsenal's 19 opponents, a record for a 20 team Premier League season; scoring against every team but Sunderland and Manchester United. However this was equalled by Robin van Persie in 2012. On 13 September 1997, he broke Cliff Bastin's club record to become Arsenal's then-all-time top scorer with a hat-trick against Bolton Wanderers, and his memorable goal celebration saw him reveal a shirt with "Just Done It" written on it.

Wright's final goal at Highbury, on 4 October against Barnsley, was his 300th career goal for both Crystal Palace and Arsenal. He scored his final goal for the club on 6 January 1998 in a League Cup quarter-final victory against West Ham United at the Boleyn Ground. A hamstring injury ruled him out for much of the remainder of the season. In his absence, Arsenal were eliminated in the semi-final by Chelsea, ending their hopes of a domestic treble. He was an unused substitute as Arsenal won the 1998 FA Cup Final, and lifted his first Premier League title as the Gunners completed a league and cup double.

Wright scored 185 goals from 288 appearances (279 starts) for Arsenal, and scored eleven hat-tricks for them, a total surpassed only by Jimmy Brain and Jack Lambert. As of the 2022–23 season, he is Arsenal's second highest goalscorer of all time, behind Thierry Henry who broke his record in 2005. Wright was placed fourth in a 2008 poll of fans conducted on the club's website to select their 50 greatest players.

=== Later career ===
In July 1998, Wright moved to West Ham United for £500,000. He spent fifteen months as a West Ham player, scoring the winner on his debut against Sheffield Wednesday, without reaching the same form he had at Arsenal. During his spell there he made headlines when he vandalised the referee's dressing room at Upton Park after being sent off during a match against Leeds United. He had subsequent short spells at Nottingham Forest, Celtic, and Burnley (whom he helped to promotion to Division One) before retiring in 2000.

Whilst at Celtic, Wright became involved in a campaign by some fans calling for the removal of manager, John Barnes. Celtic's performances had been poor and Wright, Barnes and Regi Blinker were considered by some to be not sufficiently talented to improve the club. Wright and Blinker were consequently abused by some Celtic fans. Wright said of the incidents, "I felt I was caught up in a war crisis in Kosovo not involved in a football result that wrecked John Barnes' career as Celtic manager. Some so-called fans, a few morons who know nothing better, covered my car in spit, they were shouting obscenities at myself and Regi Blinker." Wright scored on his debut for Celtic as he had for Nottingham Forest. He finished his club career with 313 goals in all competitions.

== International career ==
Wright was overlooked for the 1990 World Cup but was handed his England debut by manager Graham Taylor in February 1991. He started in the 2–0 victory against Cameroon at Wembley and helped England reach the finals of Euro 1992 in Sweden. Despite the fact that his international career spanned eight years, 87 matches and three full-time managers, he only started 17 times and was a used substitute in 16 matches. In each of the seven seasons that followed the 1990 World Cup, Wright never scored fewer than 23 goals a season for his club. He scored 25 goals for Crystal Palace during the 1990–91 campaign before going on to break the 30 club-goal barrier five times in the following six seasons. Despite Wright's goalscoring feats, the highest number of games he started for England consecutively was three—something he only did twice.

Taylor, who became England manager after the 1990 World Cup in Italy and remained in charge for 38 matches, only handed Wright nine starts and seven substitute appearances. He opted instead to use a whole host of less prolific strikers, including Nigel Clough of Nottingham Forest, Paul Stewart of Tottenham Hotspur, David Hirst of Sheffield Wednesday and Brian Deane of Sheffield United. Wright did not make it into the squad for Euro 1992, with Clough, Gary Lineker of Tottenham Hotspur, Alan Shearer of Southampton and Arsenal teammates Alan Smith and Paul Merson preferred. This was particularly surprising as Wright had been the highest top division goalscorer in England that season.

Five of Wright's nine international goals were scored under Taylor's management; these included a vital late equaliser in a 1–1 away draw against Poland in May 1993 and four goals in the 7–1 away win against San Marino in Bologna, Italy, in November 1993, the final match of Taylor's reign as manager. Both matches were qualifiers for the 1994 World Cup in the US, for which England failed to qualify - missing out for the first time since 1978.

Terry Venables replaced Taylor as manager after the unsuccessful 1994 World Cup qualifying campaign but Wright's appearances in the side became even more limited. Despite featuring in four of the first five matches under Venables, albeit three times as a substitute, Wright never played under his management again. Ultimately, it cost Wright a place in the squad for Euro 1996, where England reached the semi-finals as the host nation. Venables vacated his position as England manager after the tournament and was replaced by Glenn Hoddle.

After being absent from international football for 21 consecutive matches, Wright was recalled to the England team by Hoddle in November 1996 when he came off the bench in a 2–0 1998 World Cup qualifying victory in Georgia. It had been over two years since Wright had made his previous England appearance in October 1994.

Four of Wright's nine international goals were scored under Hoddle's management. He scored the winner in a 2–1 friendly win against South Africa at Old Trafford in May 1997, and the opener a month later in a 2–0 victory over Italy in the Tournoi de France, and assisted Paul Scholes for England's second goal. England won the four-team tournament, staged as a warm-up event to the 1998 World Cup in France, which also included world champions Brazil as well as the hosts.

Wright went on to help England qualify for the 1998 World Cup, scoring two goals and assisting Paul Gascoigne in the 4–0 qualifying campaign victory against Moldova at Wembley in September 1997, before producing arguably his best performance for his country in the vital 0–0 draw in Italy, a month later, which secured his country's passage through to the finals. He missed out on the finals through injury.

Following the 1998 World Cup, Wright went on to play a further two times for England as a West Ham United player. He came on as a substitute in the Euro 2000 qualifier in Luxembourg, a match England won 3–0 in October 1998. He made his final international appearance, a month later, in a friendly against the Czech Republic at Wembley. England won the match 2–0 and it also turned out to be Hoddle's final game as manager.

Wright started seven matches and was used as a substitute on six occasions under Hoddle, who was manager for 28 matches. He made his first appearance under Hoddle aged 33 and his final appearance under him aged 35. England went on to qualify for Euro 2000 in Belgium and the Netherlands, by which time, Wright was approaching his 37th birthday and retired from club football shortly after the tournament. Only Mick Channon played more times for England without being selected for a World Cup or European Championships squad. However, during Channon's England career, which spanned the years 1972–1977, England failed to qualify for either of these tournaments, while during Wright's they qualified for two European Championships and one World Cup.

== Post-playing career ==
=== Ashford United ===
In March 2007, Wright was appointed Director of football strategy of Isthmian League team, Ashford Town, (now reformed as Ashford United) with him taking his place on the board of directors, following his purchase of a stake in the club.

=== Coaching career ===
On 18 May 2012, Wright was named as a first team coach at Milton Keynes Dons. He left the role in June 2013.

=== Baller League UK ===
In November 2024, it was announced that Wright was set to manage one of the 12 teams in the upcoming Baller League UK, a six-a-side football league. He became the co-manager of Wembley Rangers AFC alongside Arsenal Women winger Chloe Kelly.

== Media career ==
=== Television ===
Wright began his television career as a guest host on Top of the Pops. He was later signed up by ITV to present his own chat show, Friday Night's All Wright, on which he interviewed celebrities such as Elton John, Mariah Carey and Will Smith; it ran for two series.

Since then, he has gone on to present programmes such as Friends Like These, I'd Do Anything, The National Lottery Wright Ticket and What Kids Really Think. He took over from David Seaman in Autumn 2004 as a team captain on BBC game show They Think It's All Over, which ran until 2006.

Wright has also starred in Men & Motors show Wright Across America, where he fulfils a lifelong dream to travel coast to coast across America on a Harley-Davidson motorbike, a show famous for Wright's rocky relationship with co-host and legendary custom bike builder Nicky Bootz.

He also starred in Ian Wright's Excellent Adventure in which he travels to Greenland with a friend, 'Mrs C' (Novello Noades, wife of former Crystal Palace chairman Ron Noades), to scale the highest mountain in the Arctic, Gunnbjørn.

Wright appeared as a "celebrity hijacker" in the television series Big Brother: Celebrity Hijack.

On 12 March 2008, Wright was confirmed as one of the presenters of the new series of the popular game show Gladiators.

Wright was a presenter on Channel 5's early evening magazine programme Live from Studio Five, from its launch in September 2009, to August 2010. He originally co-presented the show alongside former model Melinda Messenger and the runner-up of The Apprentice, Kate Walsh. After Messenger left, Wright continued to present the show alongside Walsh and new presenter Jayne Middlemiss until 11 August 2010. At the beginning of the 12 August edition, Walsh and Middlemiss announced that Wright would not be presenting the show that evening. At the end of the programme, they revealed that he had left the show and would not be returning. Wright was also reported to be unhappy with other changes at the programme, such as its daily airtime being cut from 60 to 30 minutes. During an interview with Absolute Radio the next day, Wright stated: "It's just been arguments for the last couple of weeks." His contract was due to end in September 2010 and was not going to be renewed. The show was axed in February 2011.

Wright presented Football Behind Bars, a reality TV series aired on Sky1 about his programme to socialise young men incarcerated at Portland Young Offenders Institution in Dorset by organising them in a football academy. The program was an experiment with the prison authority with an eye to expanding it to other prisons if it was successful. The series ran 6 episodes, aired weekly from 7 September to 12 October 2009.

Wright featured on an episode of BBC's Top Gear in 2005, posting a 1.47.8 on the celebrity power lap times.

In November 2019, it was announced that Wright would be participating in the nineteenth series of I'm a Celebrity...Get Me Out of Here!.

In February 2021, it was announced that Wright would be hosting a new prime time game show for ITV called Moneyball.

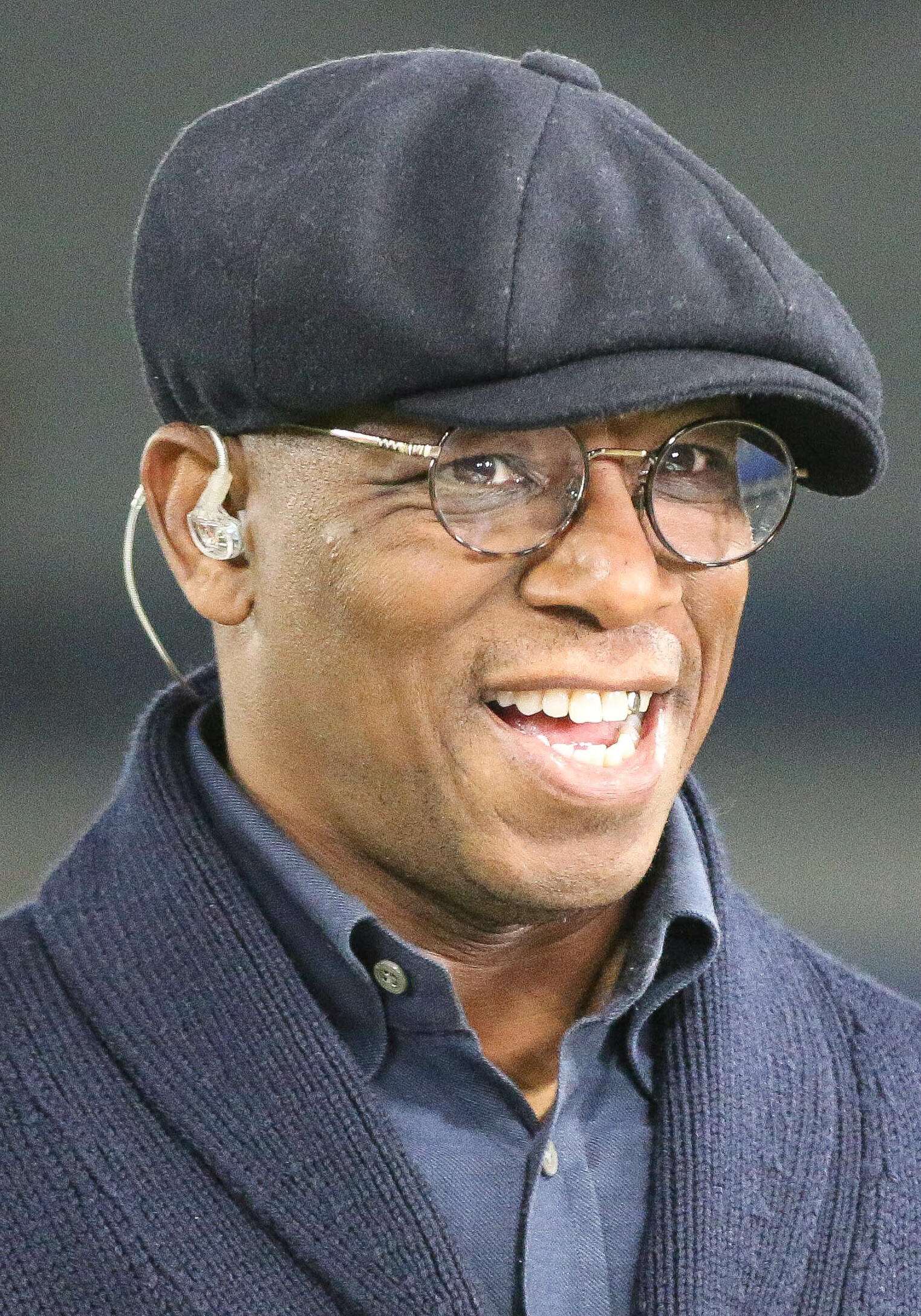
Wright in 2022

Wright makes a number of appearances in the Amazon Original sports docuseries All or Nothing: Arsenal, which documented the club by spending time with the coaching staff and players behind the scenes both on and off the field throughout their 2021–22 season.

On 10 March 2023, Wright announced he would boycott the next broadcast of Match of the Day in solidarity with presenter Gary Lineker, who stepped back from his duties amid a row over comment criticising the government's immigration policies. Wright made his last appearance on the show on 19 May 2024.

=== Radio ===
In 2001, Wright joined BBC Radio 5 to co-host The Wright & Bright Show with former Crystal Palace teammate Mark Bright.

Wright formerly co-hosted the drivetime slot (4–7 pm) Monday to Thursday on Talksport, with Adrian Durham. In 2010 Wright joined Absolute Radio, hosting Rock 'N' Roll Football, post match analysis and chat on Saturdays from 5 till 7. In August 2013, he joined Kelly Cates as the Sunday co-presenter on BBC Radio 5's 606 football phone-in programme.

=== Other media appearances ===
Wright appears in the Apple TV+ series Ted Lasso, alongside Seema Jaswal as the co-host of the fictional sports show, Forza Love of the Game.

Wright appears in the Netflix-distributed science fiction action drama film The Kitchen as Lord Kitchener, a pirate radio station DJ who broadcasts to the struggling community known as The Kitchen. The film debuted on Netflix on 12 January 2024, having premiered at the 67th BFI London Film Festival on 15 October 2023.

== Punditry ==
Since his retirement from football, Wright appeared as a pundit on BBC Sport's International Match of the Day and has been a pundit for the 2002 and 2006 World Cups and Euro 2004.

On 17 April 2008, Wright quit his job on Match of the Day and criticised the programme for using him as a "comedy jester", saying "Fans want people who are dressed like them. They've got no one to relate to on TV and that's why I've said to them I don't want to do the England games any more".

In 2013, he joined BT Sport as a studio analyst for their coverage of the Premier League, FA Cup, UEFA Champions League and UEFA Europa League. Since 2014, Wright has also been a regular studio pundit, along with Lee Dixon, for all England matches on ITV, and was one of the main studio pundits for their coverage of 2014 FIFA World Cup and Euro 2016.

Wright left BT Sport in 2017 to increase his role at the BBC, regularly appearing on Match of the Day and Match of the Day 2, as well as continuing to co-host the 606 phone in show on Sunday evenings alongside Kelly Cates. Wright also now co-hosts 5 Live Sport on a Monday evening, alongside Mark Chapman on BBC Radio 5 Live. He also appears every Tuesday on The Debate on Sky Sports' Premier League channel, once again teaming up with Kelly Cates. Wright also appears regularly as one of the BBC's lead pundits for live games, regularly working with Gary Lineker and Alan Shearer.

From October 2020, Wright co-hosted his own podcast, Wrighty's House, on The Ringer FC, with a rotating panel of guests including Musa Okwonga, Ryan Hunn, Jeanette Kwakye, Flo Lloyd-Hughes, Carl Anka and Mayowa Quadri. The last episode was 3 June 2025 - unknown if on permanent hiatus.

Since September 2024, Wright has co-hosted the Crossways football podcast with former England captain Steph Houghton.

In 2020, Wright was named TV/Radio Pundit of the Year by the Football Supporters' Association. He won the award for a second time in 2022 as well as Pundit of the Year at the Broadcast Sports Awards and World Soccer's Broadcaster of the Year.

== Commercials ==
Wright has appeared in television commercials for the chicken sauce, Chicken Tonight, Nescafé and Ladbrokes along with Chris Kamara, Ally McCoist and former Arsenal teammate Lee Dixon. Wright appeared in an advertisement for the Wii console where he was seen playing Mario Strikers Charged and Wii Sports with his son Shaun. In his playing career, Wright was sponsored by the sportswear company Nike, and appeared in Nike commercials. In October 1992, Ian Wright featured in the first TV commercial for Nike in the UK, entitled "Kick it". In 1996, he starred in a Nike commercial titled "Good vs Evil" in a gladiatorial game set in a Roman amphitheatre. Appearing alongside football players from around the world, including Ronaldo, Eric Cantona, Luís Figo, Patrick Kluivert, Paolo Maldini and Jorge Campos, they defend "the beautiful game" against a team of demonic warriors, which culminates with Cantona striking the ball and destroying evil. In 1997, he starred in Nike's "Park Life" commercial (set to the tune "Parklife" by Blur) where a group of pub league players playing amateur football at Hackney Marshes in east London are suddenly joined by top Premier League footballers, including Wright, Cantona, David Seaman and Robbie Fowler. In 2000, "Park Life" was ranked number 15 in Channel 4's poll of The 100 Greatest TV Ads.

Wright has also done work for Barclays.

== Writing ==
In 1993, Wright wrote and released the song "Do the Right Thing", which was co-written and produced by Pet Shop Boys member Chris Lowe. It reached No. 43 on the UK Singles Chart.

While he was still a professional footballer at Arsenal, Wright wrote his autobiography Mr Wright, which was published in hardback by Collins Willow in 1996.

Wright is also a columnist for tabloid newspaper The Sun.

In 2016, Wright wrote an updated version of his autobiography called A Life in Football, published by Constable.

In 2021, Wright and Musa Okwonga co-wrote Striking Out, his first novel. The book is aimed at children and young people and is inspired by many issues that Wright himself dealt with while growing up as a young, black, working-class footballer in London.

== Personal life ==
Wright adopted Shaun, the son of his then-girlfriend Sharon Phillips, when Shaun was three years old; Wright and Phillips later had another son together named Bradley. Both sons went on to become professional footballers, as did Shaun's son D'Margio. Wright also has a son from a different relationship.

In June 2014, whilst Wright was away in Brazil as a pundit for the 2014 FIFA World Cup, his wife Nancy was held at knifepoint as a gang burgled their home whilst their children were upstairs. He flew back to England but later returned to Brazil, where he served as a pundit on ITV for the match between Cameroon and Brazil.

== Honours and awards ==
Shortly after his retirement from playing, Wright was appointed Member of the Order of the British Empire (MBE) in the 2000 New Year Honours for services to football. This caused some surprise in view of Wright's poor disciplinary record. On 21 April 2022, Wright was inducted into the Premier League Hall of Fame.

He was appointed Officer of the Order of the British Empire (OBE) in the 2023 Birthday Honours for services to football and charity.

He was made a Freeman of the City of London on 1 November 2023, in recognition of his sporting achievements.

== Career statistics ==
=== Club ===
Appearances and goals by club, season and competition
Club	Season	League			National cup (Note: Includes FA Cup, Scottish Cup)		League cup (Note: Includes League Cup, Scottish League Cup)		Europe		Other		Total	
Club	Season	Division	Apps	Goals	Apps	Goals	Apps	Goals	Apps	Goals	Apps	Goals	Apps	Goals
Crystal Palace	1985–86	Second Division	32	9	1	0	1	0	—		2 (Note: Appearances in Full Members' Cup)	0	36	9
Crystal Palace	1986–87	Second Division	38	9	1	0	4	1	—		1	0	44	10
Crystal Palace	1987–88	Second Division	41	20	1	0	3	3	—		1	0	46	23
Crystal Palace	1988–89	Second Division	42	24	1	0	2	1	—		9 (Note: Five appearances and five goals in Full Members' Cup, four appearances and three goals in Second Division play-offs)	8	54	33
Crystal Palace	1989–90	First Division	26	8	4	2	4	1	—		3	2	37	13
Crystal Palace	1990–91	First Division	38	15	3	1	5	3	—		6	6	52	25
Crystal Palace	1991–92	First Division	8	5	—		—		—		—		8	5
Crystal Palace	Total		225	90	11	3	19	9	—		22	16	277	118
Arsenal	1991–92	First Division	30	24	0	0	3	2	0	0	—		33	26
Arsenal	1992–93	Premier League	31	15	7	10	8	5	—		—		46	30
Arsenal	1993–94	Premier League	39	23	3	1	4	6	6 (Note: Appearances in European Cup Winners' Cup)	4	1 (Note: Appearance in FA Charity Shield)	1	53	35
Arsenal	1994–95	Premier League	31	18	2	0	3	3	9	9	2 (Note: Appearances in European Super Cup)	0	47	30
Arsenal	1995–96	Premier League	31	15	2	1	7	7	—		—		40	23
Arsenal	1996–97	Premier League	35	23	1	0	3	5	2 (Note: Appearances in UEFA Cup)	2	—		41	30
Arsenal	1997–98	Premier League	24	10	1	0	1	1	2	0	—		28	11
Arsenal	Total		221	128	16	12	29	29	19	15	3	1	288	185
West Ham United	1998–99	Premier League	22	9	1	0	2	0	—		—		25	9
West Ham United	1999–2000	Premier League	0	0	—		0	0	1 (Note: Appearance in UEFA Intertoto Cup)	0	—		1	0
West Ham United	Total		22	9	1	0	2	0	1	0	—		26	9
Nottingham Forest (loan)	1999–2000	First Division	10	5	—		—		—		—		10	5
Celtic	1999–2000	Scottish Premier League	8	3	1	0	1	0	0	0	—		10	3
Burnley	1999–2000	Second Division	15	4	—		—		—		—		15	4
Career total			501	239	29	15	51	38	20	15	25	17	626	324

=== International ===
Appearances and goals by national team and year
National team	Year	Apps	Goals
England	1991	4	0
England	1992	3	0
England	1993	9	5
England	1994	4	0
England	1995	0	0
England	1996	1	0
England	1997	8	4
England	1998	4	0
Total		33	9

Scores and results list England's goal tally first, score column indicates score after each Wright goal.

List of international goals scored by Ian Wright
No.	Date	Venue	Opponent	Score	Result	Competition
1	29 May 1993	Silesian Stadium, Chorzów, Poland	Poland	1–1	1–1	1994 FIFA World Cup qualification
2	17 November 1993	Stadio Renato Dall'Ara, Bologna, Italy	San Marino	2–1	7–1	1994 FIFA World Cup qualification
3	17 November 1993	Stadio Renato Dall'Ara, Bologna, Italy	San Marino	4–1	7–1	1994 FIFA World Cup qualification
4	17 November 1993	Stadio Renato Dall'Ara, Bologna, Italy	San Marino	6–1	7–1	1994 FIFA World Cup qualification
5	17 November 1993	Stadio Renato Dall'Ara, Bologna, Italy	San Marino	7–1	7–1	1994 FIFA World Cup qualification
6	24 May 1997	Old Trafford, Manchester, England	South Africa	2–1	2–1	Friendly
7	4 June 1997	Stade de la Beaujoire, Nantes, France	Italy	1–0	2–0	1997 Tournoi de France
8	10 September 1997	Wembley Stadium, London, England	Moldova	2–0	4–0	1998 FIFA World Cup qualification
9	10 September 1997	Wembley Stadium, London, England	Moldova	4–0	4–0	1998 FIFA World Cup qualification

== Honours ==
Crystal Palace

- Football League Second Division play-offs: 1989
- Full Members' Cup: 1990–91
- FA Cup runner-up: 1989–90

Arsenal

- Premier League: 1997–98
- FA Cup: 1992–93, 1997–98
- Football League Cup: 1992–93
- European Cup Winners' Cup: 1993–94; runner-up: 1994–95

West Ham United

- UEFA Intertoto Cup: 1999

Burnley

- Football League Second Division runner-up: 1999–2000

Individual

- First Division Golden Boot: 1991–92
- Arsenal Player of the Season: 1991−92, 1992−93
- Crystal Palace Player of the Year: 1988–89
- PFA Team of the Year: 1988–89 Second Division, 1992–93 Premier League, 1996–97 Premier League
- FA Cup top scorer: 1992–93
- UEFA Cup Winners' Cup top scorer: 1994–95
- Football League Cup top scorer: 1995–96
- Premier League Player of the Month: November 1996
- Ballon d'Or Nominations: 1995, 1997
- English Football Hall of Fame: 2005
- Crystal Palace Centenary XI: 2005
- BBC Goal of the Season: 1989–90
- Crystal Palace Player of the Century
- Premier League Hall of Fame: 2022
- PFA Merit Award: 2023

=== Orders ===
- Order of the British Empire

== Television awards and nominations ==
Year	Award	Category	Nominee/work	Result	Ref.
2025	Royal Television Society Programme Awards	Best Sports Presenter, Commentator or Pundit	UEFA Euro 2024	Nominated	
