= Queensmead School =

Coordinates: 51.5578°N 0.3888°W

Location
- Queens Walk; South Ruislip, Middlesex, HA4 0LS; United Kingdom

Information
- Type: Academy
- Motto: Excellence Through Learning
- Established: 1953
- Local authority: Hillingdon
- Department for Education URN: 136711 Tables
- Head teacher: Rhona Johnston
- Age: 11 to 18
- Website: https://www.queensmeadschool.org.uk/

Queensmead School is a co-educational secondary school with academy status located on Queens Walk, South Ruislip, in the London Borough of Hillingdon, England. In 2009, Queensmead established a federation with Northwood School. It offers a wide range of subjects with multiple sports grounds.

== Academic standards ==
The school had an Ofsted inspection in March 2008 and was assessed as Outstanding, Grade 1 on a four-point scale. The school was assessed by Ofsted again in July 2022 and its rating was decreased to Good, Grade 2 on a four-point scale.

In 2008, 44% of students achieved 5 A*–C grades at GCSE.

== Notable former pupils ==
- Lee McQueen – winner of 2008 The Apprentice
- Scouting for Girls – band member
- Elyar Fox – singer
- Daniel Bramble – Professional athlete
- Daran Little – screenwriter
- Chris Mepham – footballer for West Bromwich Albion F.C. and the Wales national football team
- Tiff Stevenson – comedian and panellist
- Tariq Lamptey – footballer for Queens Park Rangers F.C. and the Ghana national football team
