= Josie Gibson =

English television personality (born 1985)

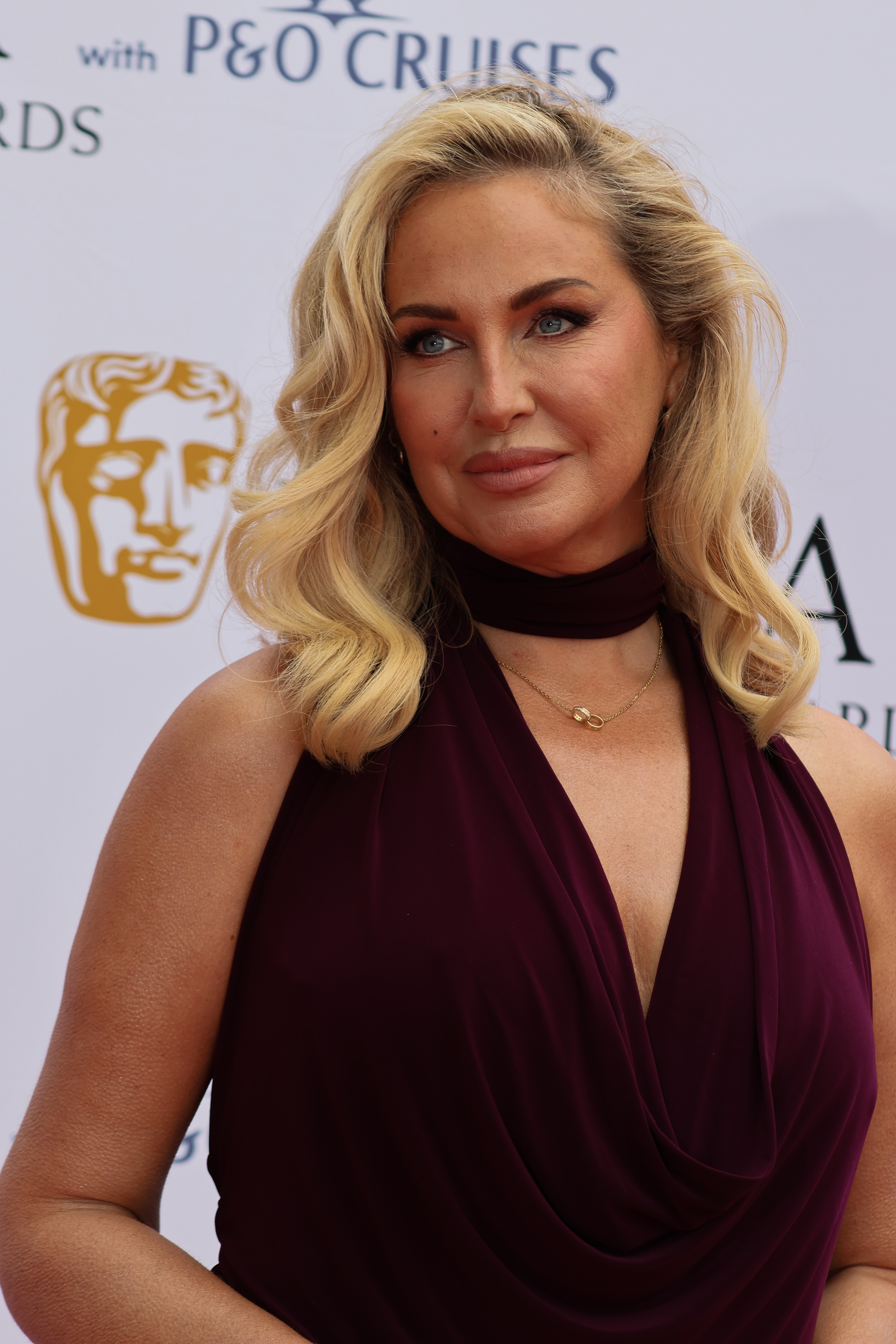
- Gibson at the 2026 British Academy Television Awards
- Born: Josephine Diane Shirley Gibson; 24 January 1985 (age 41); Bristol, England
- Education: Brimsham Green School
- Occupation: Television personality
- Years active: 2010–present
- Employer: ITV
- Children: 1

Josephine Diane Shirley Gibson (born 24 January 1985) is an English television personality. She rose to prominence in 2010 after winning the 11th series of the Channel 4 reality show Big Brother. Since 2019, Gibson has been a regular contributor to ITV's This Morning, initially appearing as a segment presenter and competition announcer, before becoming a relief co-presenter of the programme from 2021. In 2023, she was a contestant on the 23rd series of the reality show I'm a Celebrity...Get Me Out of Here! which she finished in fourth place.

== Early life ==
Daughter of Mandy Gibson, Josie is the eldest of six siblings (three brothers and three sisters). She is originally from South Gloucestershire and attended Brimsham Green School in Yate.

== Career ==
In 2010, Gibson entered the Big Brother house. Throughout her stay, she received five nominations for eviction, and never faced the public vote. She entered into a romantic relationship with fellow housemate John James Parton and upon leaving Big Brother, the couple confirmed that they were dating. On Day 66 of Big Brother 11, Gibson was selected by the other housemates to receive a ticket to the final. On Day 77 of Big Brother 11, she was announced as the winner with 77.5% of the public vote; the highest percentage out of any other Big Brother series.

After an interview with Davina McCall, she confirmed she was going to take part in Ultimate Big Brother, then re-entered the Big Brother house 18 minutes later. On Day 3 of Ultimate Big Brother, Gibson walked out of the house, while other housemates were nominating. It was confirmed that she was not returning to the Ultimate Big Brother house. She was reunited with Parton seconds after breaking out, as he was at the Big Brother compound recording a message for her. Her fellow housemates shared their sadness after her exit, with Ulrika Jonsson crying and eventual winner Brian Dowling predicting that she would have won if she had stayed.

In October 2010, she and Parton appeared in a one-off fly on the wall show following their lives together called Josie and John James: What Happened Next. In May 2011, she appeared in three-part reality TV series There's Something About Josie. Also in 2011, she split up with Parton.

=== Presenting and other projects ===
In early 2011, Gibson released a perfume called 'Josie'. She also released limited edition hoodie tops on her official website. She also became a spokesmodel for Curvissa Clothing. She did an implied nude photoshoot in August 2011. Gibson also wrote a regular column for Now magazine.

Gibson was a showbiz reporter for Channel 5 show OK! TV. She appeared on the series on Thursdays, and presented from the first episode in January 2011. She also guest presented the series when Jenny Frost was away. OK! TV ended on 16 December 2011. She was also a reporter for Big Brother's Bit on the Side from August to November 2011.

Gibson was a weekly animal reporter for Channel 5's Live With.... She appeared first on 8 March 2012, and was a regular feature on the show and appeared once every week. Beginning in April 2012, Gibson wrote a column in Now magazine called "Just Josie".

Gibson has appeared on numerous television series, such as: Celebrity Wedding Planner, Celebrity Impossible, Let's do Lunch with Gino & Mel, The Wright Stuff, Silent Library, Wagons Den, Celebrity Juice, Live from Studio Five, The Vanessa Show, OK! TV, Big Brother's Bit on the Side, Live with..., This Morning and Loose Women, as well as having her own reality shows John James and Josie: What happened Next and There's Something About Josie.

In January 2013, Gibson became the official new face of Pearlys, a UK nationwide cosmetic teeth whitening company. Later that month, she released a workout DVD called Josie Gibson: 30 Second Slim.

In 2016, Gibson appeared on the Celebrity version of Dinner Date, in which she went for meals at three men's houses and choose one for a second date with Jack, at the time she was single, one of them recognised her slim frame and face from Big Brother.

In 2017, she appeared as contestant on The Jump, but was the first celebrity eliminated after refusing to take part in the live ski jump. It was announced shortly after her departure from The Jump that she would be present a new dating show called Getting Jiggy With Josie, to air later in the year on Made TV.

In 2019, Gibson joined This Morning as a competition announcer. On 16 November 2021 she became a presenter on the show, filling in last minute for Holly Willoughby. It was subsequently confirmed that she would present the series as holiday cover. In 2023, she presented alongside Willoughby in the wake of Phillip Schofield's departure from the programme.

In 2022, Gibson was a contestant on the second series of Cooking with the Stars reaching the final. In October 2022 Gibson appeared as a panelist on Channel 4's The Great British Bake Off: An Extra Slice.

She participated in the twenty third series of I'm a Celebrity...Get Me Out of Here!. She was the seventh celebrity to be eliminated, finishing in fourth place and narrowly missing a spot in the final.

== Personal life ==
Gibson donated £20,000 of her winnings to Young Lives vs Cancer when she left Big Brother.

In September 2018, she gave birth to her son, Reggie-James.

== Filmography ==
Year	Title	Role	Note(s)
2010	Big Brother	Contestant	Winner (Day 77)
2010	Ultimate Big Brother	Contestant	Walked (Day 3)
2010	8 Out of 10 Cats	Guest	1 episode
2010	Josie and John James: What Happened Next	Presenter	
2011	OK! TV	Showbiz reporter	
2016	Loose Women	Panellist	
2017	The Jump	Contestant	
2019–2023	This Morning	Relief presenter	
2022	Cooking with the Stars	Contestant	Series 2
2023	I'm a Celebrity...Get Me Out of Here!	Contestant	Series 23
2023–present	This Morning	Rotating presenter	
2024	Ultimate Christmas Gift Guide with Josie Gibson	Presenter	
2024	The Masked Singer UK	Contestant (Christmas Cracker)	Christmas special
2025	Around the World in First Class	Presenter	Four-part series
2026	Josie Gibson’s Big Country Build	Presenter	Seven-part series
2026	Would I Lie to You?	Guest	Series 19
2026	How To Clean Up For Cash	Presenter	Six-part series
