= Mobexpert =

Romanian furniture retailer and manufacturer

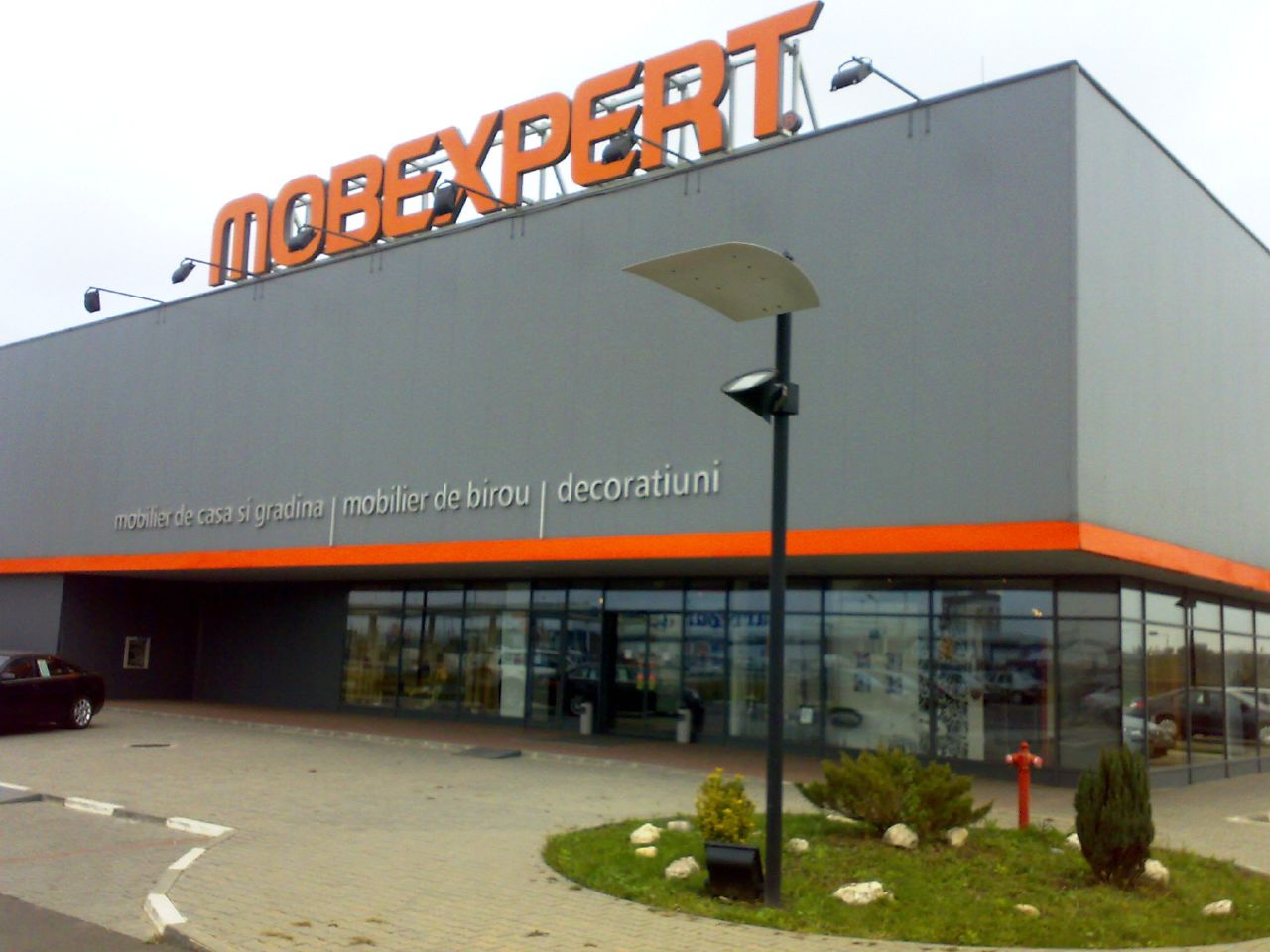
- Type: Private
- Industry: Retail
- Founded: 1993; 33 years ago
- Founder: Dan Șucu; Camelia Șucu
- Headquarters: Bucharest, Romania
- Number of locations: 27 (2026)
- Area served: Romania
- Key people: Adelina Badea (CEO)
- Products: Furniture, home furnishings and accessories
- Owner: Dan Șucu
- Number of employees: 2,100 (2026)
- Website: mobexpert.ro

Mobexpert is a Romanian furniture retailer and manufacturer headquartered in Bucharest. Founded in 1993 by Dan Șucu and Camelia Șucu, the group has an integrated business model encompassing furniture retail, manufacturing and logistics.

In 2026, Mobexpert's retail network comprised 27 stores in Romania: 12 large-format stores, eight smaller concept stores and seven partner stores. The group employed around 2,100 people.

== History ==
Mobexpert was established in 1993. Dan Șucu had previously entered the furniture business in 1991 with a business partner, before establishing Mobexpert as an independent company focused initially on office furniture. Dan and Camelia Șucu opened a 150 m² store in the Unirea Shopping Center in Bucharest, initially selling mainly imported office furniture. The store was later closed.

The company subsequently expanded into furniture manufacturing, initially producing office chairs and later sofas and modern melamine furniture. In 1995, Mobexpert began expanding its own retail network and distributing furniture imported from major European manufacturers. The group subsequently acquired majority stakes in several Romanian furniture manufacturers, including Samus Mex in Dej, Ilefor in Târgu Mureș and Mobstrat in Suceava, expanding its production and export operations.

In 1999, the group began developing its first large-format furniture and home furnishings store. The 13,000 m² store, located in the Pipera area of Bucharest, opened in 2001 and was followed by other large-format locations in Bucharest and elsewhere in Romania.

In 2006, Mobexpert opened its Băneasa store in Bucharest following an investment of €15 million. With an area of 15,000 m², it is the largest store in the network.

During the 2000s, Mobexpert continued to expand its retail and manufacturing operations. By 2009, the group employed around 3,500 people and included a number of separately managed retail, manufacturing, import and service companies.

Following the legal separation of Dan and Camelia Șucu, the two divided their business interests. In 2007, Camelia Șucu sold her approximately 40% stakes in 15 companies of the Mobexpert group to Dan Șucu for around €40 million and withdrew from the business.

The group later expanded its retail formats. Mobexpert launched its online store during the 2014, while in 2021 it introduced the smaller-format concept store, beginning with a location in Craiova. Further concept stores were subsequently opened in several Romanian cities.

In 2025, Mobexpert opened a new 10,000 m² store in the Pallady area of Bucharest and relocated its stores in Cluj-Napoca and Brașov.

== International expansion ==
Mobexpert expanded outside Romania in the 2000s through its office furniture division. Mobexpert Office entered Serbia and Bulgaria in 2005, operating stores in Belgrade and Sofia.

On 19 September 2007, Mobexpert opened its first large-format furniture store outside Romania in Sofia. The 11,000 m² store represented an investment of approximately €10 million. At the time, the company planned further expansion in Bulgaria and Serbia.

The group closed its stores in Serbia and Bulgaria in 2016 and refocused its expansion on Romania. Șucu said that international expansion had required greater financial resources than anticipated and that the company preferred to direct investment towards areas where returns were more predictable.

== Operations ==
Mobexpert combines furniture retail with manufacturing, logistics and services including delivery and assembly. The company operates several retail formats, ranging from large-format furniture stores, generally covering between approximately 8,000 and 14,000 m², to smaller concept stores of around 1,500–4,000 m². Some big stores also include outlet sections, while the company also operates an online store.

Among its Bucharest locations, the Băneasa store forms part of the Galeriile Mobexpert shopping gallery, which also houses several other furniture and home-furnishing showrooms, including BoConcept, Caracole, Ethan Allen and Kare, as well as an eMAG showroom. Caracole and Ethan Allen are operated in Romania by Select Design, a furniture business owned by Diana Șucu, the wife of Mobexpert owner Dan Șucu. The eMAG showroom, opened in 2018, occupies approximately 2,400 m² within the complex.

The group also operates five furniture factories in Romania, producing furniture for both the domestic market and export.

== Sponsorship ==
Mobexpert became an official partner of the youth academy of Rapid București in 2021 and later became one of the club's principal partners. Mobexpert owner Dan Șucu entered the club's shareholding in 2022 and became its majority shareholder in 2023. In 2025, Rapid announced the development of the Rapid–Mobexpert Training Centre in Ștefăneștii de Jos, Ilfov County.
