= Lisa Byrne =

British magazine editor

Lisa Lorraine Byrne (born 12 April 1970, Shrewsbury) was the Editor-in-Chief of the UK edition of the worldwide celebrity gossip magazine, OK!.

== Career ==
She began her career as the Editor of the Northallerton, Thirsk and Bedale Times in 1994 (the newspaper closed in 2008).

In 1995 she moved to London and became a freelance writer for the Mail on Sunday, Sunday Mirror, and the Sunday People.

=== OK! ===
From 1998 she was a features writer, then Senior Writer and Features Editor on OK!. In 2002 she became the deputy editor. She became Editor of OK! in 2004. OK! magazine is part of Express Newspapers group, owned by Northern & Shell and is based at 10 Lower Thames Street.

Media offices
Preceded by Nic McCarthy	Editor of OK! 2004–2012	Succeeded by Christian Guiltenane
