= Yasmina Siadatan =

British businesswoman (born 1981)

Yasmina Siadatan (born 1981) is a British businesswoman of British and Iranian descent. She was the winner of the fifth series of the British television show The Apprentice. As the winner, she was offered a job working for businessman Alan Sugar, who presents the show.

== Education ==
Siadatan was born in Hull in 1981. She attended Kendrick School, Reading and later studied economic history at the London School of Economics.

== Career prior to The Apprentice ==
In 2007, with the help of her brother, she set up the Myalacarte restaurant in Caversham, Reading which closed in 2017. Since then, a pizza restaurant has been on the site.

== The Apprentice ==
In 2009, Siadatan entered The Apprentice as one of sixteen contestants in its fifth series. She reached the final where she competed against Kate Walsh and was eventually hired as Alan Sugar's apprentice, taking a £100,000-a-year job with his company, Amscreen, where 2008's winner, Lee McQueen worked at the time.

== Personal life ==
Siadatan has two children, born in 2011 and 2012.

Preceded by Lee McQueen	The Apprentice winner Series 5 (2009)	Succeeded by Stella English
