= Brimsham Green School =

Location
- Broad Lane; Yate, Gloucestershire, BS37 7LB; England; 51°33′08″N 2°25′31″W

Information
- Type: Community school
- Motto: Inspiring all to Excel
- Local authority: South Gloucestershire
- Department for Education URN: 109319 Tables
- Ofsted: Reports
- Head Teacher: Kim Garland
- Gender: Mixed
- Age: 11 to 18
- Enrolment: 915
- Capacity: 1,235
- Website: http://www.brimsham.com

Brimsham Green School is a comprehensive secondary school in Yate, South Gloucestershire, England.

Situated toward the northern edge of Yate and serving both the town and adjacent South Gloucestershire villages, Brimsham Green School has modern facilities grouped within a single site. It has a humanities block (B), design and technology block (D), art block (D), mathematics block (J), science block (G), English block (M & L), music block (M), languages block (C), a study centre, sports hall, and reception (A), and they are all on one floor except for the humanities block which has a lift providing access to the first floor.

In recent years the school has undergone a number of modernisations including the building of a new Design Technology block where the cricket cages had previously been and with wide-ranging extensions made to the English and Music departments. The Administration block has also seen the library move out into the English block. The school operates a sixth form provision which offers A Levels and BTECs as programmes of study for students.

The school was considering Academy status, but the governors and staff decided that the school and pupils would not benefit from transferring due to the extra expense incurred during the transfer.

In a 2019 inspection the school was rated "Good" by Ofsted.

Notable former students include television personality Josie Gibson.
