= Lee McQueen =

British entrepreneur

Lee McQueen is a British entrepreneur and winner of series 4 of the UK version of the reality show The Apprentice in which 16 candidates fought to be the winner of a £100,000 a year job working for Alan Sugar. Prior to beating 20,000 candidates to become Sugar's Apprentice in 2008, McQueen spent 10 years in the recruitment industry. Since working for Sugar, McQueen has gone on to set up his own company, Raw Talent Academy and feature regularly in magazines, newspapers and television mostly with regard to his achievements with a lack of qualifications.

== Biography ==
McQueen, who is the son of a milkman, grew up in North London and was educated at Queensmead School in South Ruislip which is a state comprehensive where he left with a BTEC Diploma.

== The Apprentice ==
On his way to winning the Apprentice McQueen was on the losing team just three times whilst winning eight tasks, twice as the project manager, including the final and never having to face Alan Sugar in the boardroom as one of the bottom three. During the series McQueen was caught lying on his CV about the amount of time spent at university, something which even Prime Minister Gordon Brown commented on, as well as being notable for his "reverse pterodactyl" impression and his catchphrase "That's what I'm talking about!"

== Amscreen ==
McQueen started work helping to set up Amscreen as the development director. Amscreen forms a part of Sugar's holding company Amshold with Sugar's son Simon Sugar as the chief executive officer, McQueen secured his first deal with BP that saw the digital signage screens installed in 335 company-owned sites and offered to another 800 of BP's dealer partners. After 2 years in the role helping to set up Amscreen as an established company McQueen revealed in July 2010 that he was giving up his post and said "Having gained a huge amount of experience in my role at Amscreen, I felt now was the right time to start up on my own". On leaving, Sugar was quoted as saying McQueen had "made an important contribution to Amscreen and we wish him all the best".

== Raw Talent Academy ==
In September 2010 McQueen announced he had started his own company called Raw Talent Academy with the aim "to provide SMEs and corporate organisations with the vehicle to build internal sales academies into long term staffing plans". In June 2011 McQueen launched an academy in Bristol and featured on the local ITV News as well as the Bristol Evening Post as the academy looked to place 10 people in work with a local employer.

Raw Talent Academy, with McQueen as Director, have launched more sales academies across the UK in places like Watford, Birmingham and Windsor.

McQueen has also featured on ITV's Daybreak during the A-Level and GCSEs results period talking about his achievements with a lack of qualifications.

== Personal life ==
McQueen is married and lives in Oxfordshire with his wife and three daughters.

Preceded by Simon Ambrose	The Apprentice winner Series 4 (2008)	Succeeded by Yasmina Siadatan
