= OK! TV =

2011 UK celebrity TV series

- Genre: Entertainment and celebrity/News magazine
- Created by: OK! Channel 5
- Presented by: Matt Johnson; Kate Walsh; Jeff Brazier; Jenny Frost; Josie Gibson
- Country of origin: United Kingdom
- Original language: English
- No. of series: 1
- No. of episodes: 209 (list of episodes)

Production
- Producer: 5 News/Sky News
- Editors: David Kermode; David Betts
- Running time: 30–35 minutes (inc. adverts)

Original release
- Network: Channel 5
- Release: 14 February – 16 December 2011

Related
- Live from Studio Five

OK! TV is an early evening magazine programme which was broadcast on Channel 5 between 14 February 2011 and 16 December 2011. It was a brand extension of celebrity title OK! Magazine. It replaced the former magazine and discussion show Live from Studio Five on 1 February 2011, and was presented by Kate Walsh and Matt Johnson, both of whom later left the programme. Jeff Brazier and Jenny Frost replaced Walsh and Johnson in August 2011 and presented the show until its cancellation.

The show was made by the 5 News team and produced by Sky News for Channel 5. On 8 November 2011, it was announced that the show has been cancelled by Channel 5. The show aired its final edition on 16 December after ten months on air due to the contract for 5 News returning to ITN.

== Previous series ==
The show's first series was broadcast in 1999 on ITV. In 1999, Carlton Television poached the executive producer of This Morning to set up a celebrity department. The first production was OK! TV, a tie-in with the celebrity lifestyle magazine, which ran on Friday nights for six weeks from November to December 1999. Fiona Phillips hosted with Nigel Havers, Twiggy, Patsy Palmer and Tracie Bennett. Guests included Sharon Stone, Paula Yates and Tom Jones.

== Overview ==
OK! TV aired on weekdays from 18:25 to 19.00, and featured a mix of news, celebrity gossip, interviews, and chat. It replaced Live from Studio Five which was axed on 4 February 2011. Denise van Outen and Matt Johnson were announced as presenters of the programme on 3 February 2011. However, the following week, van Outen pulled out of presenting the show and was replaced by former Live from Studio Five host Kate Walsh.

On 5 April 2011, Walsh and Johnson announced that the launch of OK! TV Sunday from 10 April 2011, showing highlights of the previous week's episodes. The format was cancelled after a few weeks on air.

=== OK! TV: When 'Bruv Takes Over ===
On Wednesday 17 August 2011, Brazier and Frost presented a spin-off show devoted to Big Brother 12 and Celebrity Big Brother 8. It made its debut on the eve of the launch of CBB8. The format mixed showbiz news with reports on the previous day's events in the house along with some exclusive episode previews.

== Opening titles and set ==
The opening titles use the same logo as OK! magazine and feature various celebrities including Cheryl Cole and Kate Moss. The original set included a blue sofa where guests were interviewed and with a large OK! logo. For the duration of Big Brother 2011, the studio was moved to Elstree Studios.

== Launch ==
The debut show on 14 February 2011 contained an interview in the studio with Louis Walsh with Jenson Button acting as celebrity reporter.

=== Reception and ratings ===
Stuart Heritage of The Guardian was unimpressed with the programme's first edition. He dubbed it, "a remedial level One Show" and "colossally vapid". The ratings for the debut show showed an improvement on Live from Studio Five's low audience figures gaining 449,000 viewers (2.1%).

== Cancellation ==
In November 2011, it was announced that OKTV was to be axed from Channel 5's schedules as part of negotiations for ITN to take over as news producer for the channel in early 2012. It aired its final edition on 16 December 2011. This final edition contained a montage of clips from Brazier and Frost's time presenting the show but did not feature any material from Walsh and Johnson's interviews. The last live act to appear on the show was The Wombles who closed the very last edition of the show.

== On-air team ==
=== Presenters ===
Tenure	Presenter	Position
14 February 2011 – 16 August 2011	Matt Johnson	Main presenter(s)
14 February 2011 – 16 August 2011	Kate Walsh	Main presenter(s)
17 August 2011 – 16 December 2011	Jeff Brazier	Main presenter(s)
17 August 2011 – 16 December 2011	Jenny Frost	Main presenter(s)

=== Guest presenters ===
Dates	Presenter	Related note(s)
13–17, 20 June 2011	Jenny Frost	Kate Walsh holiday cover
4–5, 11–15 July 2011	Jeff Brazier	Matt Johnson absence
28 July; 4, 11 August 2011	Michael Underwood	Matt Johnson absence
30 August – 2 September 2011	Josie Gibson	Jenny Frost holiday cover
5–7 December 2011	Adam Rickitt	Jeff Brazier cover

=== Reporters ===
Tenure	Presenter	Notes
14 February 2011 – 16 December 2011	Josie Gibson	Social networking reporter
14 February 2011 – 16 December 2011	Minnie Stephenson	Showbiz reporter
14 February 2011 – 16 December 2011	Serene Branson	United States reporter
30 June 2011 – 16 August 2011	Jeff Brazier	Entertainment reporter
