= Your Face Sounds Familiar (British TV series) =

British television show

- Genre: Talent show
- Based on: Tu cara me suena
- Directed by: Nick Harris; Julian Smith
- Presented by: Alesha Dixon; Paddy McGuinness
- Judges: Emma Bunton; Julian Clary; Various guest judges
- Country of origin: United Kingdom
- Original language: English
- No. of series: 1
- No. of episodes: 6

Production
- Executive producers: Nic McNeilis; David Staite
- Running time: 75 minutes (inc. adverts)
- Production company: Initial

Original release
- Network: ITV
- Release: 29 June – 3 August 2013

Related
- Your Face Sounds Familiar; Stars in Their Eyes

Your Face Sounds Familiar is a British talent show based on the Spanish series of the same name (a more formal translation would be "Your Face Looks Familiar" however the chosen title achieved a unique and relevant play on words). The show began on 29 June 2013 on ITV and ended on 3 August 2013. The show was co-presented by Alesha Dixon and Paddy McGuinness, whilst the judging panel consisted of Emma Bunton, Julian Clary, and a different guest judge in each episode. Guest judges included Cilla Black, Donny Osmond, Denise van Outen, Kian Egan, and Peter Andre.

The show involved six celebrities (actors, television personalities and sportsmen) portraying various iconic singers each week to win £10,000 for their chosen charity. The winner of the series was actress Natalie Anderson; she received the £50,000 grand prize for her charity.

On 3 August 2013, Anderson was announced as the series winner. She also won Week 2, 3 and 5 of the competition (as Britney Spears, Kate Bush, and Bonnie Tyler, respectively) collecting £10,000 for each of those weeks. In total, she won £80,000 for her chosen charity over the six weeks. The other weekly winners were Cheryl Fergison, who won the first week as Dusty Springfield and Matt Johnson, winner of the fourth week as Freddie Mercury. Both received £10,000 for their charities.

In November 2014, McGuinness revealed that the show would not return for a second series as ITV had instead opted to revive Stars in Their Eyes.

== Format ==
The show challenged celebrities to perform as different iconic music artists every week, which were chosen by the show's "Randomiser". They were then judged by the panel of celebrity judges including Emma Bunton and Julian Clary. Each week, one celebrity guest judge joined Bunton and Clary to make up the complete judging panel. During the series, the celebrities were trained by vocal coach Yvie Burnett and choreographer Elizabeth Honan.

Each celebrity became transformed into a different singer each week, and performed an iconic song and dance routine well known by that particular singer. The 'randomiser' could choose any older or younger artist available in the machine, or even a singer of the opposite sex (except in week one), or a deceased singer, but it picked three out and the contestant then pressed the button to 'spin' the randomiser which selects their next singer.

=== Voting ===
The contestants were awarded points from the judges (and each other) based on their singing and dance routines. 15p from each viewer public vote was split equally between six chosen charities.

Judges award their points (up to 10 each, making a possible grand total of 30) to the contestants, while the contestants had to give 5 points to a fellow contestant of their choice (these are known as "Bonus" points) after all have performed. The total score of each contestant was then counted by summing the points from judges and contestant's voting with the points from the televoting.

Whoever was at the top of the leaderboard at the end of the each show, after the combination of the judges' and public votes, received a £10,000 cash prize for a charity of their choice and a further £50,000 grand prize for the "series champion" in the final week.

== Episode list ==
Show	Original air date	Weekly guest judge
1	29 June 2013	Donny Osmond
2	6 July 2013	Cilla Black
3	13 July 2013	Peter Andre
4	20 July 2013	Denise van Outen
5	27 July 2013	Kian Egan

== Contestants ==
On 13 June 2013, the contestant line-up was revealed. The six celebrities that took part were Denise Lewis, Matt Johnson, Alexander Armstrong, Cheryl Fergison, Natalie Anderson and Bobby Davro.

== Results summary ==
Contestant	Famous for	Week 1	Week 2	Week 3	Week 4	Week 5	Week 6	Tot	Avg	Rank by average
Natalie Anderson	Former Emmerdale actress	27	35	39	29	38	Winner	168	33.6	1
Cheryl Fergison	Former EastEnders actress	38	22	48	28	23	Runner-up	159	31.8	2
Alexander Armstrong	Presenter of Pointless	26	27	21	34	40	Runner-up	148	29.6	3
Matt Johnson	TV presenter	22	24	25	35	24	Runner-up	130	26	6
Bobby Davro	Comedian and actor	24	39	27	25	28	X	143	28.6	4
Denise Lewis	Former track and field sprinter	33	28	21	29	30	X	141	28.2	5

Color key:

indicates the winning contestant that week
indicates the runner-up contestants that week
indicates the series champion
indicates the two contestants eliminated
X indicates the contestant did not perform that week
Red numbers indicate the lowest-scoring contestant(s) that week
Green numbers indicate the highest-scoring contestant that week

=== Live show details ===
- Group performance: "It's Only Rock 'n Roll (But I Like It)" by The Rolling Stones

Contestants' performances on the first show
Order	Celebrity	Performing as	Song	Points (judges and contestants)				Total	Result
Order	Celebrity	Performing as	Song	Clary	Bunton	Osmond	Bonus	Total	Result
1	Denise Lewis	Tina Turner	"Nutbush City Limits"	7	7	9	10	33	Runner-up
2	Natalie Anderson	Katy Perry	"California Gurls"	7	7	8	5	27	Not in Top 3
3	Alexander Armstrong	Johnny Cash	"Ring of Fire"	6	8	7	5	26	Runner-up
4	Bobby Davro	Tom Jones	"Sex Bomb"	8	7	9	0	24	Not in Top 3
5	Cheryl Fergison	Dusty Springfield	"You Don't Have to Say You Love Me"	9	9	10	10	38	Winner
6	Matt Johnson	Jon Bon Jovi of Bon Jovi	"Livin' on a Prayer"	7	8	7	0	22	Not in Top 3

Bonus points

The points were then given out as follows:

- Denise gives her five points to Cheryl, taking her to 33
- Natalie gives her five points to Denise, taking her to 28
- Alexander gives his five points to Cheryl, taking her to 38
- Bobby gives his five points to Denise, taking her to 33
- Cheryl gives her points to Alexander, taking him to 26
- Matt gives his five points to Natalie, taking her to 27

==== Week 2 (6 July) ====
Contestants' performances on the second show
Order	Celebrity	Performing as	Song	Points (judges and contestants)				Total	Result
Order	Celebrity	Performing as	Song	Clary	Bunton	Black	Bonus	Total	Result
1	Matt Johnson	Taylor Swift	"We Are Never Ever Getting Back Together"	7	5	7	5	24	Not in Top 3
2	Alexander Armstrong	Johnny Rotten of Sex Pistols	"Pretty Vacant"	8	9	10	0	27	Runner-up
3	Cheryl Fergison	Anastacia	"Left Outside Alone"	8	6	8	0	22	Not in Top 3
4	Denise Lewis	Lenny Kravitz	"Are You Gonna Go My Way"	8	6	9	5	28	Not in Top 3
5	Natalie Anderson	Britney Spears	"Toxic"	9	8	8	10	35	Winner
6	Bobby Davro	Mick Jagger of The Rolling Stones	"(I Can't Get No) Satisfaction"	9	10	10	10	34	Runner-up

Bonus points

The points were then given out as follows:

- Matt gives his five points to Bobby, taking him to 34
- Alexander gives his five points to Natalie, taking her to 30
- Cheryl gives her points to Denise, taking her to 28
- Denise gives her five points to Natalie, taking her to 35
- Natalie gives her five points to Bobby, taking him to 39
- Bobby gives his five points to Matt, taking him to 24

==== Week 3 (13 July) ====
Contestants' performances on the third show
Order	Celebrity	Performing as	Song	Points (judges and contestants)				Total	Result
Order	Celebrity	Performing as	Song	Clary	Bunton	Andre	Bonus	Total	Result
1	Alexander Armstrong	Barry Manilow	"Copacabana"	6	7	8	0	21	Not in Top 3
2	Denise Lewis	Nicki Minaj	"Starships"	7	6	8	0	21	Not in Top 3
3	Matt Johnson	Elvis Presley	"Heartbreak Hotel" / "Blue Suede Shoes" / "Hound Dog"	8	9	8	0	25	Runner-up
4	Bobby Davro	Ozzy Osbourne of Black Sabbath	"Paranoid"	9	9	9	0	27	Not in Top 3
5	Natalie Anderson	Kate Bush	"Wuthering Heights"	10	10	9	10	39	Winner
6	Cheryl Fergison	Meat Loaf	"Bat Out of Hell"	9	9	10	20	48	Runner-up

==== Week 4 (20 July) ====
Contestants' performances on the fourth show
Order	Celebrity	Performing as	Song	Points (judges and contestants)				Total	Result
Order	Celebrity	Performing as	Song	Clary	Bunton	van Outen	Bonus	Total	Result
1	Natalie Anderson	Justin Bieber	"Baby"	8	8	8	5	29	Runner-up
2	Matt Johnson	Freddie Mercury of Queen	"Don't Stop Me Now"	10	10	10	5	35	Winner
3	Bobby Davro	Tammy Wynette	"Stand by Your Man"	7	6	7	5	25	Not in Top 3
4	Cheryl Fergison	Lulu	"Shout"	10	9	9	0	28	Runner-up
5	Alexander Armstrong	Morrissey of The Smiths	"Please, Please, Please, Let Me Get What I Want"	8	8	8	10	34	Not in Top 3
6	Denise Lewis	Beyoncé	"Single Ladies (Put a Ring on It)"	9	8	7	5	29	Not in Top 3

==== Week 5: Semi-final (27 July) ====
Contestants' performances on the fifth show
Order	Celebrity	Performing as	Song	Points (judges and contestants)				Total	Result
Order	Celebrity	Performing as	Song	Clary	Bunton	Egan	Bonus	Total	Result
1	Bobby Davro	Paul McCartney of The Beatles	"I Want to Hold Your Hand"	8	8	7	5	28	Eliminated
2	Denise Lewis	Gloria Gaynor	"I Will Survive"	9	8	8	5	30	Eliminated
3	Matt Johnson	Rod Stewart	"Da Ya Think I'm Sexy?"	8	8	8	0	24	Runner-up
4	Natalie Anderson	Bonnie Tyler	"Total Eclipse of the Heart"	10	9	9	10	38	Winner
5	Alexander Armstrong	Luciano Pavarotti	"Nessun dorma"	10	10	10	10	40	Runner-up
6	Cheryl Fergison	Madonna	"Material Girl"	9	7	7	0	23	Not in Top 3

==== Week 6: Final (3 August) ====
In this episode, the eliminated celebrities (Bobby Davro and Denise Lewis) performed as Mary J Blige and George Michael in a special duet.

Contestants' performances on the sixth show
Order	Celebrity	Performing as	Song	Result
1	Cheryl Fergison	Cher	"The Shoop Shoop Song"	Runner-up
1	Cheryl Fergison	Adele	"Someone Like You"	Runner-up
2	Matt Johnson	Bruce Springsteen	"Born in the USA"	Runner-up
2	Matt Johnson	Robbie Williams	"Let Me Entertain You"	Runner-up
3	Natalie Anderson	Jessie J	"Domino"	Winner
3	Natalie Anderson	Mariah Carey	"Without You"	Winner
4	Alexander Armstrong	Susan Boyle	"I Dreamed a Dream"	Runner-up
4	Alexander Armstrong	Frank Sinatra	"Fly Me to the Moon"	Runner-up

== Judges ==
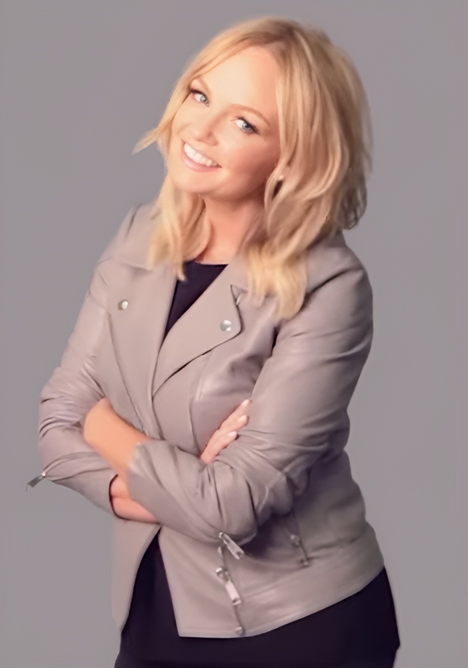
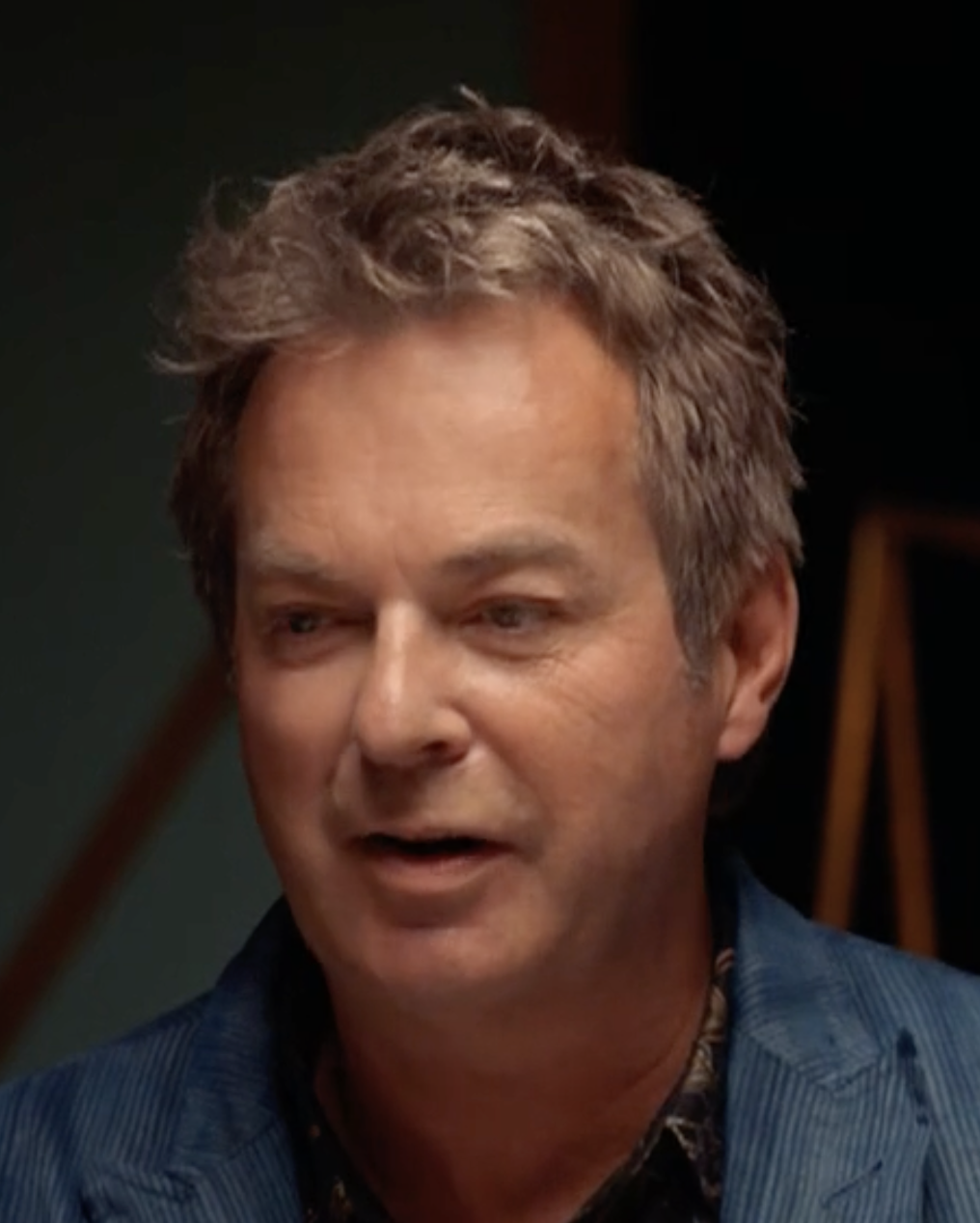
Judges Emma Bunton and Julian Clary

On 3 June 2013, singer and presenter Emma Bunton was announced as a judge on the show, of this she said "I love Saturday night television. Your Face Sounds Familiar is a great family show and what I love about the whole thing is the celebrities will have to deal with a great big production." She added "Being nasty is not fun - viewers are sick of people not being very nice to each other. It is about enjoying the acts. I am going to be fair. I know what it feels like to be in an audition and I want to pick up on the positive side."

On the same day, entertainer and comedian Julian Clary was announced as another judge on the show.

On each episode Bunton and Clary are joined by a guest judge who makes up the third judge on the panel. These have included Donny Osmond, Cilla Black, Peter Andre, Denise van Outen and Kian Egan.

== Presenters ==
On 3 June 2013, it was announced that Alesha Dixon and Paddy McGuinness would present the six episodes in the first series. Of this, Dixon said, "This show is going to be a lot of fun. I can't wait to see their transformations and spectacular performances. I know that Paddy [McGuinness] and I are going to have our work cut out keeping them all in line!", whilst McGuinness said, "To be given a live show on Saturday night TV is a massive honour. Hairbrushes at the ready, for a proper good old Saturday night sing along. It's an honour to be in the same company as Ant & Dec, Dermot O'Leary and lest we not forget, Russ Abbot."

Several sources announced prior to the show, that if McGuinness had to leave at any time (due to his wife Christine being in labour with twins), Stephen Mulhern would take over as the co-presenter on the show. However, this didn't need to happen.
