= Matt Johnson (TV presenter) =

Welsh television presenter

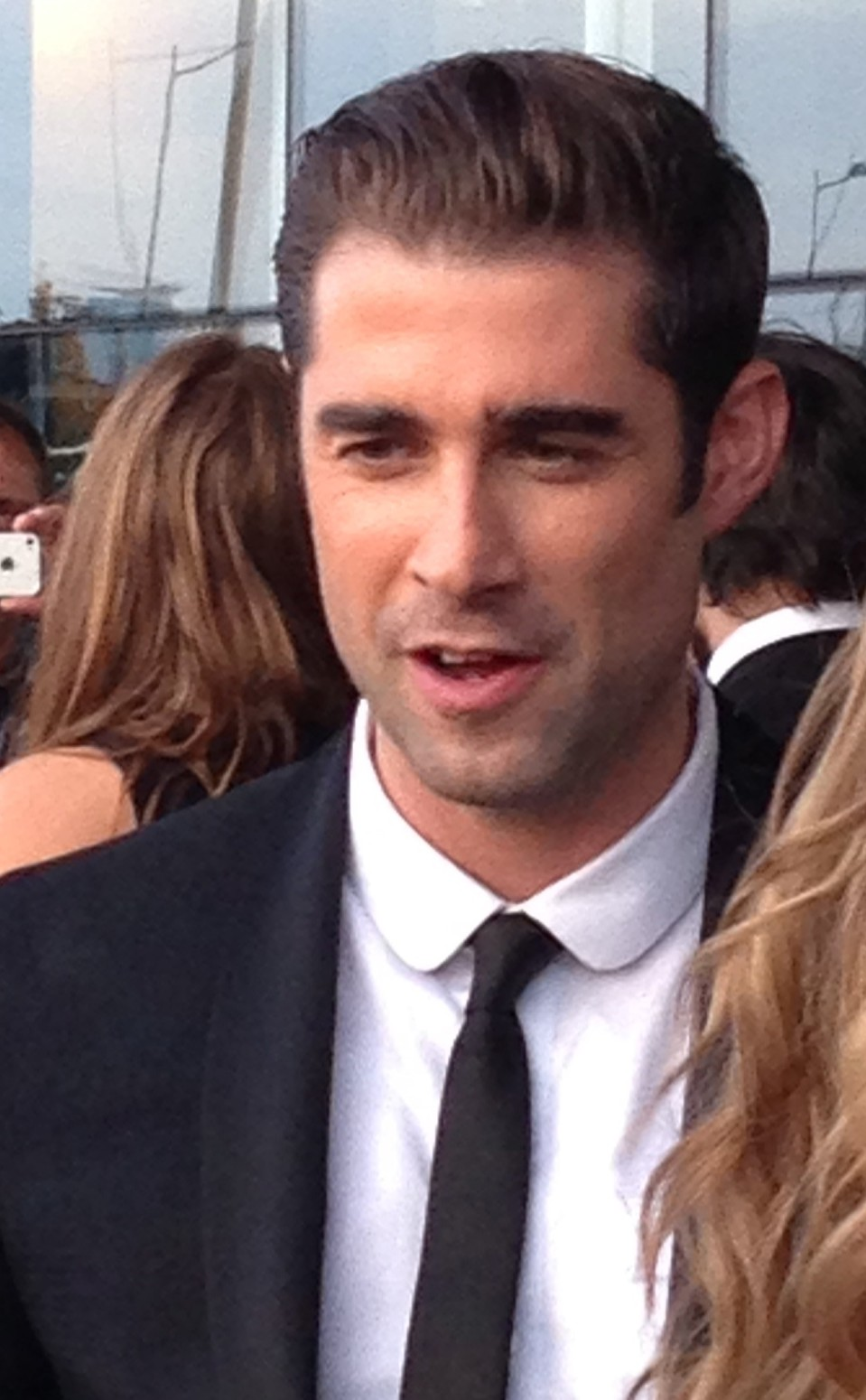
- Matt Johnson in 2013
- Born: Matthew Alan Johnson; 18 November 1982 (age 43); Caerphilly, Wales, UK
- Occupation: Presenter
- Notable credit(s): This Morning; OK! TV; Surprise Surprise
- Family: Pamela Johnson and Gary Johnson (parents)

Matthew Alan Johnson (born 18 November 1982) is a Welsh presenter and men’s mental health advocate from Caerphilly and is best known for hosting the interactive "Hub" on ITV's This Morning between 2010 and 2013 and for co-hosting Channel 5's OK! TV.

He has also presented The National Lottery Draws and has been a presenter for Surprise Surprise.

== Career ==
=== Television ===
Johnson joined ITV Cymru Wales in January 2009 presenting The Wales Show until December 2010.

In September 2010, Johnson joined the interactive "Hub" team on ITV's This Morning programme. On 3 June and 28 October 2011, he guest co-presented the main This Morning show on ITV. Johnson left This Morning in 2013 and presented his final show on 30 August.

From 14 February to 16 August 2011, Johnson was co-presenter of Channel 5's OK! TV. In 2012, Johnson appeared as a celebrity contestant on the Christmas edition of Take Me Out. In August 2013, he was a contestant on an episode of Tipping Point: Lucky Stars He appeared as a contestant on a celebrity episode of The Chase in December 2014.

Johnson occasionally presented The National Lottery Draws on BBC One. He also co-presented Hwb, a programme for Welsh learners, on Welsh-language channel S4C. In 2015, he became a reporter for the ITV series Surprise Surprise. In October 2016, Johnson took part in Celebrity Haunted Hotel Live, presented by Christine Bleakley.

In 2013, Johnson was a contestant on the ITV series Your Face Sounds Familiar, performing as different singers each week. Johnson finished as one of the runners-up to winner Natalie Anderson.

On 26 December 2022, he starred in an episode of Celebrity Dinner Date.

=== Acting ===
In 2007, Johnson appeared on an episode of Gavin & Stacey playing José, Stacey's brother Jason's boyfriend.

== Acknowledgements ==
In 2015, Johnson was in the top 50 most in-demand charity ambassadors in the world.

== Personal life ==
In May 2017, he presented Matt Johnson: Iselder a Fi (Depression and Me) on S4C, a Welsh-language personal documentary about issues of mental health, especially among young men, including his own story of struggling with depression.

== Filmography ==
- Wales Tonight (2009–10) – Reporter
- The Wales Show (–2010) – Presenter
- This Morning (2010–13) – Hub presenter & stand-in main presenter
- OK! TV (2011) – Presenter
- The National Lottery Draws (2012–2013) – Presenter
- Take Me Out: Celebrity Special (2012) – Contestant
- Tipping Point: Lucky Stars (2013) – Contestant
- Your Face Sounds Familiar (2013) – Contestant
- The Chase: Celebrity Special (2014) – Contestant
- Hwb – Presenter
- Surprise Surprise (2015) – Reporter
- Celebrity Haunted Hotel Live (2016) – Contestant
