= The Apprentice (British TV series) series 5 =

Fifth season of UK television series

The Apprentice
- Series 5
- Promo group shot of Alan Sugar standing before the candidates for series 5
- Starring: Alan Sugar; Nick Hewer; Margaret Mountford
- No. of episodes: 14

Release
- Original network: BBC One
- Original release: 25 March – 7 June 2009

Series chronology
- ← Previous; Series 4 Next → Series 6

The fifth series of British reality television series The Apprentice was broadcast in the UK on BBC One, from 25 March to 7 June 2009. Because of ITV's live coverage of a 2010 FIFA World Cup qualification match involving England, the final episode was broadcast three days earlier to avoid schedule clashing. It is the last series to feature Margaret Mountford as one of Alan Sugar's aides, after deciding to leave following the conclusion of the fifth series, although she would retain a occasional roles in the programme until the end of the ninth series. Alongside the standard twelve episodes, two specials were aired alongside this series – "The Final Five" on 3 June; and "Why I Fired Them" on 5 June.

Although sixteen applicants successfully earned a place on this series, one participant was forced to drop out before filming began, leaving production staff unable to replace them. As a result, fifteen candidates were left to take part in the fifth series, with Yasmina Siadatan becoming the overall winner. Excluding the specials, the series averaged around 8.37 million viewers during its broadcast.

== Series overview ==
Applicants took part in pre-production auditions and interviews throughout July 2008, across London, Glasgow, Manchester and Birmingham. Sixteen candidates were eventually selected to form the final line-up for the fifth series; but before production could begin on the first episode, one of the applicants, Adam Freemans was forced to drop out due to family reasons. As a result, production staff were left with no time to find a replacement, leading to the decision that filming go ahead with the remaining fifteen participants, with Alan Sugar required to refrain from multiple firings outside of the Interviews stage. As such, it is the only series in the show's history to feature an unbalanced mix of male and female candidates. This series' team names were Empire and Ignite. Filming of the boardroom scenes for the tenth episode was delayed until the day before work on the Interviews stage was to begin, due to candidate Kate Walsh requiring time off to attend a family funeral.

Following the previous series, Sugar deemed it unwise to continue using exotic locations abroad for the setting of tasks in the wake of the global economic recession that had begun in 2007. His decision led to any tasks set abroad to be limited to within the EU, until production of the ninth series in 2012. Another change for the show was the departure of Paul Kemsley, who chose not to return as an interviewer for the fifth series, leading to him being replaced with Alan Watts. After discussing with Sugar about her intention to leave the programme, Margaret Mountford confirmed the move in her column for The Daily Telegraph on 1 June 2009, with it also being discussed by both Mountford and Sugar during their appearance on You're Fired following the series finale.

Yasmina Siadatan was crowned the series' winner. A few weeks after conclusion of the series, she developed an office relationship with a fellow development manager, resulting in her getting pregnant. After spending time on maternity leave, she fell pregnant again in 2012, ultimately handing in her notice to Sugar that she would be leaving his employment, later acquiring a job under Dragons' Den judge James Caan.

=== Candidates ===
Candidate	Background	Age	Result
Yasmina Siadatan	Restaurateur	27	Winner
Kate Walsh	Licensing Development Manager	27	Runner-up
Debra Barr	Senior Sales Consultant	24	Fired after Interviews stage
Lorraine Tighe	National Accounts Manager	36	Fired after Interviews stage
James McQuillan	Senior Commercial Manager	32	Fired after Interviews stage
Howard Ebison	Retail Business Manager	24	Fired after tenth task
Ben Clarke	Trainee Stockbroker	22	Fired after ninth task
Mona Lewis	Senior Financial Manager	28	Fired after eighth task
Philip Taylor	Estate Agent	29	Fired after seventh task
Noorul Choudhury	Science Teacher	33	Fired after sixth task
Kimberly Davis	Marketing Consultant	33	Fired after fifth task
Paula Jones	Human Resources Consultant	29	Fired after fourth task
Majid Nagra	Business Development Manager	28	Fired after third task
Rocky Andrews	Sandwich Chain Owner	21	Fired after second task
Anita Shah	Business Strategist	35	Fired after first task
Adam Freeman	Internet Entrepreneur	30	Left prior to first task

=== Performance chart ===
Candidate	Task Number											
Candidate	1	2	3	4	5	6	7	8	9	10	11	12
Yasmina	LOSS	WIN	IN	BR	IN	LOSS	LOSS	WIN	LOSS	WIN	IN	HIRED
Kate	LOSS	IN	LOSS	LOSS	WIN	IN	BR	IN	IN	BR	IN	RUNNER-UP
Debra	BR	IN	WIN	LOSS	IN	BR	IN	LOSE	BR	IN	FIRED	
Lorraine	LOSS	IN	IN	IN	BR	IN	LOSE	IN	WIN	BR	FIRED	
James	IN	BR	LOSE	LOSS	IN	LOSS	IN	BR	LOSE	IN	FIRED	
Howard	WIN	BR	LOSS	IN	LOSS	IN	IN	LOSS	IN	FIRED		
Ben	IN	LOSS	BR	BR	IN	LOSE	LOSS	IN	FIRED			
Mona	LOSE	IN	IN	IN	LOSS	IN	WIN	FIRED				
Philip	IN	LOSS	IN	IN	BR	WIN	FIRED					
Noorul	IN	LOSS	IN	WIN	LOSS	FIRED						
Kimberly	LOSS	IN	LOSS	IN	FIRED							
Paula	LOSS	IN	IN	FIRED								
Majid	IN	LOSS	FIRED									
Rocky	IN	FIRED										
Anita	FIRED											
Adam	LEFT											

Key:

The candidate won this series of The Apprentice.
The candidate was the runner-up.
The candidate won as project manager on his/her team, for this task.
The candidate lost as project manager on his/her team, for this task.
The candidate was on the winning team for this task / they passed the Interviews stage.
The candidate was on the losing team for this task.
The candidate was brought to the final boardroom for this task.
The candidate was fired in this task.
The candidate lost as project manager for this task and was fired.
The candidate left the process.

== Episodes ==
No. overall	No. in series	Title	Original release date	UK viewers (millions)
57	1	"Scrubbing Up"	25 March 2009	8.71
Sir Alan's new search for an apprentice begins with a twist – a dropout before the process begins, leaving fifteen candidates vying for his job offer. For their first task, teams set up their own cleaning company with a budget of £200. The men focus on cleaning mini-cabs for the task, after dropping an initial idea to do shoe-shining. The women split to tackle cleaning limos and classic cars, yet good sales are hampered by poor quality work and overspending on equipment and supplies. In the boardroom, Empire secure a significantly higher profit than Ignite, leaving the team to make excuses over their performance. Of the final three, Anita Shah becomes the first to be fired, for overspending and demonstrating no business skills or initiative.
58	2	"A Hungry Business"	1 April 2009	7.16
This week's task is to offer a catering service to London professionals, as each team comes up with their own themed service. Ignite focus on tight budget control and a Mediterranean theme, achieving a steady profit. Empire focus on an "Olympic" theme, but face serious problems from overspending on food, missing out on lunchtime contracts, and performing poorly in their dinner service. Ignite secure victory, leaving Empire to face questions over the mistakes they made. In the losing team, Rocky Andrews is fired for the mistakes he made as leader, and for being deemed too inexperienced.
59	3	"Survival of the Fittest"	8 April 2009	8.04
This week, teams must design a brand new piece of portable fitness equipment, complete with poster campaign, and pitch their concept to retailers. Empire opt for a simple design, creating a small multi-gym kit, but their concept is criticised by potential clients, thus receiving few orders. Ignite create an exercise ball with attachments, with their concept well-received by the retailers, and thus receive considerable orders. Of the final three, Majid Nagra is fired for his lack of contributions and commitment to the process.
60	4	"A Soap Opera"	15 April 2009	7.86
This week, teams must create and sell a brand new bath and beauty product made with natural ingredients. Empire use seaweed to create their product, which receives good sales but is compromised by a mix up with ingredients and miscalculated measurements that cause them to overspend on manufacturing materials. Ignite use honeycomb in their creation yet, despite reasonable sales, the team face issues over the appeal of their design. In the boardroom, Empire's profit is greatly reduced by the team's manufacturing problems, leaving Ignite to win the task. Although all of the final three are held culpable for their team's loss, Paula Jones is fired for her ineffective management and chiefly contributing to the blunders that caused the team's loss.
61	5	"The Advertising Challenge"	22 April 2009	8.32
This week, teams must design and market a new cereal, complete with its own original character and TV advert, before pitching their concept to industry experts. Empire focus on a brand with a pirate theme, receiving praise for their presentation, yet face questions over the box's design and confusion over their target market. Ignite focus on a brand with a superhero character and an underwear theme, receiving positive feedback on their advert, but face criticism over an incomplete box design and poor pitching. Feedback from the experts leads Sir Alan to deem Empire's concept the best, leaving Ignite to face questions over their poorly-received brand. Of the final three, Kimberly Davis is fired over her poor leadership.
62	6	"Bric-a-Brac Race"	29 April 2009	8.29
This week, Sir Alan gives both teams a collection of items. Candidates must identify their value, find the right market, and negotiate a good price for each piece. Empire perform poorly on the task after misinterpreting the task's goal, selling most of their items for less than their actual value. Ignite manage to sell most of their items for above their market price yet, despite a good performance, one item is sold for less than its appraised value, cancelling out any profit they made. While both teams make a loss as a result, Ignite secure the victory, leaving Empire to face scrutiny over their disorganised effort. In the losing team, Noorul Choudhury is fired for his contributions on tasks, his behaviour and attitude to others, and his weak performance throughout the process.
63	7	"Heading North"	6 May 2009	8.45
Travelling north for their next challenge, each team must choose two innovative products, and then sell their choices to the right markets within two days. Empire select bespoke sleeping bags and dog leads, but struggle to find customers during the first day, restricting their sales efforts to the second day. Ignite select bicycle accessories and cat playhouses; despite securing a sale on the first day, they struggle to make many on the second day. In the boardroom, Empire are crowned victorious. Of the final three, Philip Taylor is fired for his lack of sales, his negativity and behaviour, and his attitude towards Sir Alan when discussing his performance on the task.
64	8	"Cool Margate"	13 May 2009	8.50
Teams work to rebrand the seaside resort of Margate for the 21st century, each creating a promotional concept, complete with posters and leaflets, before pitching their creations to local and industry experts. Empire create a gay resort theme for their rebranding, being praised over the potential of their design and making use of the resort's existing gay scene, yet face criticism over poorly designed posters and leaflets. Ignite create a family resort theme for their rebranding, which is praised for good execution, yet face questions over the lack of potential in their concept. Feedback from experts determine Ignite the winner, leaving Empire to face a review of their poorly-received concept. In the losing team, Mona Lewis is fired for letting her dislike of the theme affect her work on the task.
65	9	"Baby Love"	20 May 2009	8.90
The teams are tasked with selling baby products at Britain's biggest baby show. Empire choose a birthing pool and a hand-made rocking horse, but manage few sales throughout the task due primarily to the high price of the rocking horse. Ignite choose toddler helmets and pushchairs and, despite one of their choices being sold more cheaply elsewhere at the expo, they achieve decent sales and win the task. Of the final three, Sir Alan fires Ben Clarke over the team's choice of products, his lack of sales during the task, and his behaviour throughout the process.
66	10	"Car Crash TV"	27 May 2009	7.14
Sir Alan returns to an old favourite, as each team is given an airtime slot on a shopping channel to sell a range of products. Empire opt for a low-value assortment, including a head-wrap and an RC toy car, with the team selling well. Ignite opt for a more diverse range of products, ranging from low price to high-ticket items, but performed poorly. In the boardroom, Ignite face questions over their contributions, after Empire are deemed the winners. In the losing team, Sir Alan fires Howard Ebison for being an unexceptional performer with no notable skills.
67	SP–1	"The Final Five"	3 June 2009	5.06
As the finale draws closer, this special episode profiles the five remaining candidates. Discussing their backgrounds, experiences, personalities, strengths, and weaknesses, are candidates' friends, family and colleagues, as well as Sir Alan's aides, Nick Hewer and Margaret Mountford.
68	11	"Interviews"	3 June 2009	9.76
After facing ten tasks as teams, the five remaining candidates now compete as individuals in their next task – a series of tough, gruelling interviews with four of Sir Alan's most trusted associates. Each member faces scrutiny over their backgrounds, work experience and performance within the process. Sir Alan fires James McQuillan for his poor attitude and background, and both Lorraine Tighe and Debra Barr for displaying aggressive natures in the interviews; Yasmina Siadatan and Kate Walsh proceed to the final.
69	SP–2	"Why I Fired Them"	5 June 2009	N/A
As the final looms, Sir Alan takes a look back at the series so far. From the cartoonish characters made for breakfast cereals, to the soap manufacturing blunder and the Margate branding task, he relives all of the mistakes, doomed decisions, and other notable events that occurred during the process, providing his reasons behind each firing.
70	12	"The Final"	7 June 2009	9.31
After facing a multitude of business tasks and a tough interview, the two finalists now face one more challenge – helped by the fired candidates, each finalist must market a brand new box of chocolates, pitching their concept to a panel of experts. Kate opts for a romantic theme for her brand, incorporating quality flavours, but faces questions over the product's overall costs. Yasmina opts for unconventional flavours that can be bought on a budget, receiving praise for the box's design and promotional campaign, but criticism over the low quality and poor taste of the product. Reviewing the performance of both finalists, Sir Alan "hires" Yasmina Siadatan for her willingness to take risks, leaving Kate Walsh to finish as runner-up. Notes: As ITV was set to cover the 2010 World Cup qualifying match between England & Andorra on 10 June, this episode was aired three days earlier to avoid schedule clashing.

== Ratings ==
Official episode viewing figures are from BARB.

Episode no.	Airdate	Viewers (millions)	BBC One weekly ranking
1	25 March 2009	8.71	4
2	1 April 2009	7.16	5
3	8 April 2009	8.04	5
4	15 April 2009	7.86	4
5	22 April 2009	8.32	2
6	29 April 2009	8.29	2
7	6 May 2009	8.45	2
8	13 May 2009	8.50	2
9	20 May 2009	8.90	2
10	27 May 2009	7.14	3
11	3 June 2009	9.76	1
12	7 June 2009	9.31	2

Specials

Episode	Airdate	Viewers (millions)	BBC One weekly ranking
The Final Five	3 June 2009	5.06	17
Why I Fired Them	5 June 2009	—N/a	—N/a
