= BoConcept =

Danish retailer (1952)

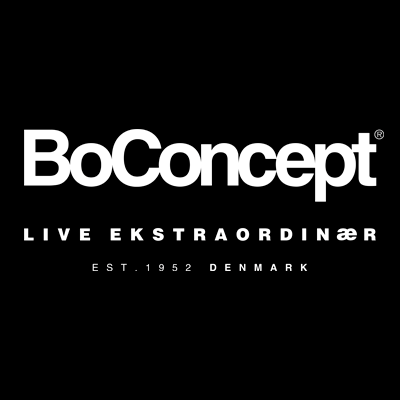
- Industry: Furniture
- Founded: Herning, Denmark; 1952
- Founder: Jens Ærthøj and Tage Mølholm
- Headquarters: Herning, Denmark
- Number of locations: 337 world-wide
- Key people: Mikael Kruse Jensen (CEO)
- Products: High-end Danish furniture
- Number of employees: 450
- Parent: 3i
- Website: www.boconcept.com

BoConcept is a Danish retail furniture chain. The first BoConcept. Store opened in Paris in 1993, but since 2006, all furniture has been sold through franchisees. BoConcept specializes in customizable modern furniture and accessories designed by international designers.

== History ==
The company was founded in 1952 by Jens Ærthøj and Tage Mølholm, both Danish craftsmen and cabinet makers. In 1954, the owners and the four employees moved into a new furniture factory. They were inspired by functionalism, which was popular amongst Danish design during the 1950s. In 1962, the founders opened another factory in Herning, where the company is still located.

In 1976, the company changed its name to Denka with the intent to enter the international market. The customization of furniture to the individual customer is an important part of their business model. The company was introduced on the Copenhagen Stock Exchange in 1984, and has been owned by 3i, a leading international investor, since 2016.

In 2022, the company was strongly criticised for continuing their activities in Russia, despite the invasion of Ukraine.

== Designers ==
BoConcept collaborates with designers in Denmark and further afield, including Morten Georgsen, Karim Rashid, and Henrik Pedersen.
