= Kate Walsh (businesswoman) =

English businesswoman and former reality television contestant

- Born: 17 June 1981 (age 44); Hednesford, Staffordshire, England
- Education: BSc
- Alma mater: Aston University
- Occupation: Businesswoman
- Years active: 2009–present
- Employer: BoConcept
- Known for: Reality TV contestant, TV presenter, business executive
- Television: The Apprentice; Live from Studio Five; OK! TV

Kate Walsh (born 17 June 1981) is an English business executive and former television personality. Walsh come to public attention in March 2009 whilst appearing as a candidate in the fifth series of The Apprentice. She subsequently co-hosted the Channel 5 evening entertainment show Live from Studio Five from to 2009 until 2011 and also its replacement show OK! TV during 2011.

In 2024, Walsh was appointed as Chief Retail Officer for BoConcept in Denmark.

== Early life ==
Walsh grew up in Staffordshire and attended Blake Valley Technology College. She graduated with a BSc degree in Psychology and Management from Aston University, Birmingham.

== The Apprentice ==
In 2009, Walsh took part in Series 5 of The Apprentice where she competed for a job working for Alan Sugar. She finished as runner-up to Yasmina Siadatan.

== TV presenting career ==
After her stint on The Apprentice, Walsh hosted a women's fashion segment on GMTV, appearing for a number of episodes.

In September 2009, Walsh joined Channel 5 to present Live from Studio Five. She presented the show alongside various co-presenters until its cancellation in February 2011. Walsh was the only presenter from the original line-up to remain with the programme from its launch. Walsh co-presented the entertainment show, OK! TV, from 14 February 2011 to August 2011.

== Business career ==
Before appearing on The Apprentice Walsh had worked in business including as a Licensing Development Manager for a coffee company.

After the TV presenting career, Walsh returned to working in the retail industry. She worked for around ten years at Pandora in a variety of roles ultimately as Senior Vice President Omnichannel Retail. In April 2024, Walsh was appointed as Chief Retail Officer for BoConcept.

== Filmography ==
Year	Film	Role
2009	The Apprentice	Contestant
2009	GMTV	Fashion presenter
2009	Ideal World	Presenter/Seller
2009–2011	Live from Studio Five	Presenter
2011	OK! TV	Presenter
2013	Dangerous Drivers' School	Participant
2013	Big Brother's Bit on the Side	Panelist
