= Live from Studio Five =

- Genre: News magazine
- Presented by: Kate Walsh; Jayne Middlemiss (2010); Ian Wright (2009–2010); Emma Willis (2010); Melinda Messenger (2009–2010); Brian Dowling (2011)
- Country of origin: United Kingdom
- Original language: English
- No. of series: 3

Production
- Producer: Sky News
- Running time: 35 minutes (2010–11); 60 minutes (2009–10)

Original release
- Network: Channel 5
- Release: 14 September 2009 – 4 February 2011

Related
- OK! TV (2011)

Live from Studio Five was an early-evening British magazine programme produced by Sky News for Channel 5. It was presented by Kate Walsh and a lineup of co-presenters. It featured interviews and discussions on topical issues, emphasizing show-business news and celebrity gossip after originally covering stories from a popular news agenda. It aired its final edition on 4 February 2011 and was replaced by OK! TV in February 2011.

== Overview ==
Live from Studio Five initially aired on weekdays from 18:30 (later 18.25) to 19:30, and featured a mix of news, celebrity gossip, interviews, and chat. There was also a news summary at 19:00 and a weather forecast at the end of the show. It replaced Channel 5's early evening news programme Five News at 7. It was reduced to a half-hour format in August 2010 when Five News at 7 was revived.

== History ==
From July 2010, Live from Studio Five began airing from 18:30 to 19:00, when Don't Stop Believers, a daily bulletin show, from Channel 5's talent show Don't Stop Believing, began occupying the 18:25 slot. On 2 August 2010, Live from Studio Five began airing from 18:25 to 19:00, cutting the show's duration from 65 minutes to 35 minutes. The change was made, to prevent the show from running at the same time as BBC One's The One Show, which is shown on weekdays, from 19:00 to 19:30. 5 News at 7 returned, airing directly after Live from Studio Five. On 23 August 2010, Live from Studio Five returned to its 18:25 slot, following the end of the series of Don't Stop Believing.

The programme celebrated its first birthday in September 2010 with a special edition featuring guests Kim Kardashian and her mother Kris Jenner, stars of Keeping Up with the Kardashians, and a live studio performance from Example. The birthday show also saw messages from some of the celebrities who had appeared on the programme and a look back at highlights of the first year.

In its final weeks on air, the show was presented by Kate Walsh, the only member of the original presenting team and guest presenters, including Natalie Pinkham and Brian Dowling. The programme aired its final edition on 4 February 2011, which ended with a five-minute montage of highlights from its 17 months on the air.

== Presenting team ==
Live from Studio Five, was originally presented by former model Melinda Messenger, former footballer Ian Wright, and The Apprentice runner-up Kate Walsh.

It was announced on 29 January 2010 that Messenger had quit her role to focus on other projects, with a series of guest hosts replacing her. Messenger later announced that she had left the show following a disagreement with fellow presenter Ian Wright. Messenger made her last appearance on the programme on 26 February 2010. The position of the third main presenter was not permanently filled until a month after Messenger's departure. During this period, guest presenters had stints in the post, including Emma Willis.

In 2010, it was announced that Willis would replace Melinda Messenger on the Channel 5 series Live from Studio Five, but after only two months, Willis announced she would be departing in order to co-present Big Brother's Little Brother and was therefore replaced by Jayne Middlemiss.

At the beginning of the 12 August 2010 edition of the programme, Walsh and Middlemiss announced that Wright was not presenting the show that evening. At the end of the broadcast, they said Wright was not returning, and would no longer present the programme. Channel 5 announced that Wright had left the programme after the station did not renew his contract. It was later revealed that Wright had been sacked from Live from Studio Five after falling out with the show's bosses over Channel 5's summer talent show Don't Stop Believing. Wright was also reported to be unhappy with other changes at the programme, such as its daily airtime being cut from 65 minutes to just 35 minutes. During a radio interview with Absolute Radio the day after he was axed, Wright stated, "It's just been arguments for the last couple of weeks." Wright's contract was due to end in September 2010, but show bosses decided not to renew it, and he made his final appearance on 11 August.

Wright was not replaced following his departure, and the programme continued with only two studio presenters. It was revealed live on air on 23 December 2010 that Middlemiss was to depart the show after seven months as presenter.

Brian Dowling co-hosted the final show with Walsh on 4 February 2011.

== Presenters ==
=== Main presenters ===
- Kate Walsh (2009–2011)
- Brian Dowling (2011)
- Jayne Middlemiss (2010)
- Emma Willis (2010)
- Ian Wright (2009–2010)
- Melinda Messenger (2009–2010)

=== Guest presenters ===
- Gloria De Piero (2009–2010)
- Natalie Pinkham (2009–2011)
- Calum Best (2010)
- Chloe Madeley (2010)
- Donna Air (2010)
- Jayne Middlemiss (2010)
- Jayne Sharp (2010)
- Ricky Whittle (2010)
- Michael Underwood (2010–2011)

=== Weather presenter ===
- Sian Welby (2010–2011)

== Opening titles and set ==
The original opening titles featured the three presenters of the time and were updated when a new presenter joined. From August 2010 the presenters no longer featured on the opening titles.

The original studio set was a desk with the three presenters sitting behind the desk until August 2010. After Wright's departure, the set was changed and the two presenters hosted the show from a sofa.

== Controversy and criticism ==
In April 2010, Minnie Stephenson, Live from Studio Five's long-running reporter, was soaked by a spitting Pete Doherty as she presented her link on the show. The incident left Stephenson shaken, and angered the show's host Ian Wright, who blasted the singer with the words: "I hate that geezer - what a complete mug he is." Stephenson later said: "Live TV is so unpredictable you never know what is around the corner and you have to be prepared for anything - a boy in a band's not going to throw me. "It's safe to say Pete Doherty is off my Christmas card list," she added.

The show met with strong criticism. In Yahoo!'s poll: "The Worst TV Shows of 2009", it fared as the third worst, receiving 11% of all the votes. Veteran broadcaster Michael Parkinson complained that he could not understand the show. He was quoted as saying "If there was a category for worst ever show, it would win hands down", whilst Jim Shelley of the Daily Mirror described it as being "excruciatingly awful", "amateurish" and "virtually pointless". Dom Joly nicknamed the presenters "Tits", "Teeth" and "Mouth". In Charlie Brooker's Screenwipe Review of 2009, TV critic Brooker described them as "Teeth", "Tits" and "Balls" (BBC4 3 January 2010 23:10). Brooker was also the most vocal in criticism, writing in his Guardian Screenburn column that the show plumbed new depths for television news.

Here is a TV show that makes any and all previous accusations of "dumbing down" seem like misplaced phony-war hysteria. A show with a running order Heat magazine would consider frighteningly lightweight. A show which, incredibly, boasts Melinda Messenger as its intellectual touchstone

- Charlie Brooker's description of the show

== Ratings ==
Live from Studio Five commenced on Monday, 14 September 2009 on Channel 5 amid much publicity in the media. The first episode fared poorly in the ratings, averaging a disappointing 476,000 viewers (2.6% of the television audience) over the hour, making it only the twelfth most-watched show on Five across Monday. This decreased to 434,000 on Tuesday, 370,000 on Wednesday, and 300,000 on Thursday. By 22 September 2009, the show had lost half its audience, attracting just 230,000 viewers.

On 15 April 2010, it was watched by 277,000 viewers and was beaten by a repeat of Britain's Got More Talent on ITV2 which had 600,000 viewers.

By January 2011, ratings were still around the 300,000 mark.
