= The Apprentice (British TV series) series 4 =

Fourth season of UK television series

The Apprentice
- Series 4
- Promo group shot of Alan Sugar standing amongst the candidates for series 4
- Starring: Alan Sugar; Nick Hewer; Margaret Mountford
- No. of episodes: 16

Release
- Original network: BBC One
- Original release: 26 March – 11 June 2008

Series chronology
- ← Previous; Series 3 Next → Series 5

The fourth series of British reality television programme The Apprentice was broadcast in the UK on BBC One, from 26 March to 11 June 2008. Over 20,000 applications were submitted, with the fourth series being the only one to date to feature more than two finalists moving forward beyond the Interviews stage. Alongside the standard twelve episodes, four specials were aired that year – "The Worst Decisions Ever" on 3 April; "Motor Mouths" on 18 April; "The Final Five" on 2 June; and "Why I Fired Them" on 8 June.

Sixteen candidates took part in the fourth series, with Lee McQueen eventually winning. Excluding the specials, the series averaged around 7.29 million viewers during its broadcast.

== Series overview ==
Applications opened in late spring 2007, towards the end of the third series' broadcast. The number of applications topped 20,000, leading to auditions and interviews being conducted regionally across London, Glasgow, Manchester and Bristol during the first two weeks of July. Once the sixteen candidates for the series were finalised, filming took place between September and October 2007. Although no major changes were made to the programme's format, the fourth series saw the introduction of another of Alan Sugar's close business associates, Karren Brady, as a fourth member of the interviewing panel, prior to her future role as Sugar's aide.

For the first task, the men named their team Renaissance, while the women named their team Alpha. Series winner, Lee McQueen, went on to initially work for Sugar's company AMSHOLD, and then for AMSCREEN as development director, under the employment of Sugar's son, Simon Sugar. He would eventually leave in 2010 to establish his own recruitment agency.

=== Candidates ===
Candidate	Background	Age	Result
Lee McQueen	Recruitment Sales Manager	30	Winner
Claire Young	Senior Retail Buyer	29	Runner-up
Helene Speight	Global Pricing Leader	32	Fired in the Final
Alex Wotherspoon	Regional Sales Manager	24	Fired in the Final
Lucinda Ledgerwood	Risk Manager	31	Fired after Interviews stage
Michael Sophocles	Telesales Executive	24	Fired after tenth task
Raef Bjayou	Entrepreneur	27	Fired after ninth task
Sara Dhada	International Car Trader	25	Fired after eighth task
Jennifer Maguire	Marketing Consultant	27	Fired after seventh task
Jenny Celerier	Sales Manager	36	Fired after seventh task
Kevin Shaw	Bank Manager	24	Fired after sixth task
Lindi Mngaza	Business Liaison Manager	22	Fired after fifth task
Simon Smith	Senior Satellite Television Engineer	35	Fired after fourth task
Ian Stringer	Software Sales Manager	26	Fired after third task
Shazia Wahab	Mosaic Artist and Company Director	35	Fired after second task
Nicholas de Lacy-Brown	Trainee Barrister, Artist and Property Developer	24	Fired after first task

=== Performance chart ===
Candidate	Task Number											
Candidate	1	2	3	4	5	6	7	8	9	10	11	12
Lee	LOSS	IN	LOSS	IN	LOSS	IN	WIN	IN	IN	WIN	IN	HIRED
Claire	WIN	LOSS	IN	BR	WIN	BR	BR	IN	BR	BR	IN	RUNNER-UP
Helene	IN	LOSS	IN	WIN	LOSS	IN	IN	LOSE	LOSS	BR	IN	FIRED
Alex	LOSE	IN	LOSS	BR	IN	LOSS	LOSS	LOSS	WIN	IN	IN	FIRED
Lucinda	IN	BR	IN	IN	LOSE	IN	IN	WIN	IN	IN	FIRED	
Michael	LOSS	IN	LOSS	LOSS	IN	WIN	BR	BR	BR	FIRED		
Raef	BR	WIN	LOSS	IN	LOSS	IN	IN	IN	FIRED			
Sara	IN	LOSS	WIN	LOSS	IN	BR	IN	FIRED				
Jennifer	IN	LOSS	IN	IN	BR	IN	FIRED					
Jenny	IN	LOSE	IN	LOSS	IN	LOSS	FIRED					
Kevin	LOSS	IN	BR	IN	IN	FIRED						
Lindi	IN	LOSS	IN	IN	FIRED							
Simon	LOSS	IN	BR	FIRED								
Ian	LOSS	IN	FIRED									
Shazia	IN	FIRED										
Nicholas	FIRED											

Key:

The candidate won this series of The Apprentice.
The candidate was the runner-up.
The candidate won as project manager on his/her team, for this task.
The candidate lost as project manager on his/her team, for this task.
The candidate was on the winning team for this task / they passed the Interviews stage.
The candidate was on the losing team for this task.
The candidate was brought to the final boardroom for this task.
The candidate was fired in this task.
The candidate lost as project manager for this task and was fired.

== Episodes ==
No. overall	No. in series	Title	Original release date	UK viewers (millions)
41	1	"Fishy Business"	26 March 2008	6.73
Sir Alan begins a new search for his next apprentice from a pool of sixteen candidates. Their first task sees each team attempting to sell £600 of seafood at markets across London. The women achieve decent sales and perform efficiently on the task, despite struggling to identify and price their stock. The men struggle to sell due to a delayed start, with some stock being incorrectly priced, while panic-selling reduces their profit margin further. In the boardroom, the women secure victory, leaving the men arguing over their team's sales strategy. Of the final three, Nicholas de Lacy-Brown becomes the first to be fired, for his mistakes with pricing the team's stock.
42	2	"A Dirty Job"	2 April 2008	6.73
This week, teams are tasked with operating a laundry service. Renaissance secures plenty of work from large companies and door-to-door canvassing, returning the laundry on time and to a high standard. Alpha focus on targeting businesses for custom but secure less work, while suffering a delayed start and losing some clients' belongings. In the boardroom, the men secure victory, while the women clash during discussions on their loss; Sir Alan fires Shazia Wahab for being responsible for losing items of clothing.
43	SP–1	"The Worst Decisions Ever"	3 April 2008	2.07
In a special episode, former candidates from the past three series and celebrity fans look back over some of the worst decisions made during tasks throughout the programme's history.
44	3	"Cooking with Gas"	9 April 2008	7.32
Pub cuisine is the basis for the next task, as each team host a themed lunch and dinner. Renaissance opt for an Italian theme, achieving good sales, yet face issues in sourcing their ingredients and lack proper cost control. Alpha opt for a Bollywood theme, earning a decent income from focused sales tactics and keeping costs low, despite not being able to make any lunchtime sales. Renaissance lose the task and, of the final three, Ian Stringer is fired over his inadequate leadership and lack of strategy on the task.
45	4	"Photo Finish"	16 April 2008	7.43
Teams are tasked with running a photography business. Alpha hire a celebrity look-a-like, managing to complete a majority of their orders despite technical and management issues. Renaissance focus on photos with a "glamour and beauty" theme, yet complete fewer orders due to problematic communication and clashes within the team. The fallout leaves Renaissance languishing, and Alpha win the task. Of the losing team, Simon Smith is fired over his failure to be a strong leader and for being the major contributor to the team's problems.
46	SP–2	"Motor Mouths"	18 April 2008	1.73
In a special episode, former candidates and celebrity fans look back upon those candidates who failed to impress Sir Alan across the past three series.
47	5	"Mid-Series Sales"	23 April 2008	7.85
Sir Alan tasks the candidates with creating new ice-cream flavours. Alpha creates both avocado-flavoured and toffee-apple flavoured ice-creams. They achieve mediocre orders, and are compromised by time-wasting and rule-breaking. Renaissance devise berries and cider-flavoured desserts, securing a large last-minute order, despite conducting market research without a focus group and struggling to secure sales elsewhere. Renaissance ultimately win the task and, of Alpha's final three, Lindi Mngaza is fired over arranging a deal that was later disqualified.
48	6	"Yours Truly, Angry Mob"	30 April 2008	7.28
The teams are tasked with making a new range of greeting cards, to later pitch to retailers. Alpha design cards for single people as an alternative to Valentine's Day, making a considerable number of orders despite two retailers criticising aspects of their concept. Renaissance conceive of an environmental theme, securing fewer orders due to contradictions about the theme, as well as aggressive pitching. Alpha win the task, leaving Renaissance to argue amongst themselves over the faulty pitching and card design. Of the final three, Kevin Shaw is fired over his arrogant attitude and his poor decisions as leader.
49	7	"Marrakesh"	7 May 2008	7.17
Sent abroad to Marrakesh, each team is given a list of ten items to procure at bargain prices. Alpha manage to secure all the items, with reasonable negotiations made on most. Renaissance manage to secure most of the items, yet some purchases are disallowed for not matching the list's specifications, while the team suffer from disorganisation and bad negotiations. Alpha win the task through their strategy and negotiating, leaving Renaissance to descend into a heated argument over who was to blame for their loss. The episode sees a rare double-firing, with Jenny Celerier getting fired after trying to bribe a supplier into not dealing with the other team and then being caught lying to Sir Alan about who was responsible for an incorrect purchase, before Jennifer Maguire is fired for her disorganised leadership of the team.
50	8	"Wedding Hell"	14 May 2008	7.11
This week's task is to sell wedding dresses and accessories at an National Exhibition Centre expo. Alpha opt for high-end dress and lingerie, making decent sales. Renaissance focus on mid-range dresses and cakes, managing to sell a good number of their dresses, but failed to sell any of their chosen accessories due to aggressive sales techniques. Alpha secure victory and, of the losing team, Sara Dhada is fired for her aggressive salesmanship, failure to sell accessories, not listening to others, and her poor contributions on previous tasks.
51	9	"Tissues"	21 May 2008	5.73
This week's task is to create a new tissue brand, complete with an advertising campaign and sales pitch to industry experts. Alpha devise a clever brand name and product-focused campaign that is well received by experts, yet face criticism over their box's design and TV advert. Renaissance devise a simplistic brand name with a box design that is praised for its appearance, yet face criticism over the choice of name and their TV advert. With the feedback from the experts, Alpha's concept is deemed the most effective, leaving Renaissance to face questions. Of the final three, Raef Bjayou is fired, after demonstrating a lack of focus on the task's requirements.
52	10	"Re-inventing the Wheel"	27 May 2008	6.84
This week's challenge is to rent out high-value cars. Alpha choose an Aston Martin and a Pagani Zonda and, while they struggle to make sales initially, they soon manage to strike up deals. Renaissance rent out a Ferrari and a Spyker, but make fewer sales. Alpha secure a far greater total of sales to achieve victory, leaving Renaissance to be questioned over their weak performance. Of the losing team, Sir Alan fires Michael Sophocles over his actions on the task and his overall performance in the process.
53	SP–3	"The Final Five"	2 June 2008	N/A
As this year's series of The Apprentice draws closer to its finale, this special episode profiles the five remaining candidates. Discussing their backgrounds, experiences, personalities, strengths, and weaknesses are candidates' friends, family and colleagues, as well as Sir Alan's aides, Nick Hewer and Margaret Mountford.
54	11	"Interviews"	4 June 2008	7.94
After facing ten tasks as teams, the five remaining candidates now compete as individuals in their next task – a series of tough, gruelling interviews with four of Sir Alan's most trusted associates. Each member faces scrutiny over their backgrounds, work experience and performance within the process. Feedback to Sir Alan, alongside observations by his aides, leaves him with a tough decision on who will be his finalists, eventually culminating in him only firing Lucinda Ledgerwood. Despite criticism, each of the remaining four move into the final – Lee McQueen, for being a good all-rounder; Claire Young, for receiving the best report from interviewers; Helene Speight, for her good business skills; and Alex Wotherspoon for his proficient sales skills.
55	SP–4	"Why I Fired Them"	8 June 2008	N/A
As the final looms, Sir Alan takes a look back to the tasks he set for this year's series of The Apprentice. From the shopping trip in Marrakesh, to the greeting cards designs and luxury rental car challenge, he relives all of the mistakes, doomed decisions, and other notable events that occurred during the process, and provides his reasons behind each firing.
56	12	"The Final"	11 June 2008	9.29
After facing a multitude of business tasks and a tough interview, the four finalists are split into two teams to face one more challenge – helped by the fired candidates, each team are tasked to market a new male fragrance. In the boardroom, Sir Alan fires Helene Speight for her performance on the task and her negative attitude throughout the process, and Alex Wotherspoon for demonstrating few other skills besides sales and his weak overall performance. Of the remaining two finalists, Sir Alan "hires" Lee McQueen, leaving Claire Young as runner-up.

== Ratings ==
Official episode viewing figures are from BARB.

Episode no.	Airdate	Viewers (millions)	BBC One weekly ranking
1	26 March 2008	6.73	8
2	2 April 2008	6.73	9
3	9 April 2008	7.32	6
4	16 April 2008	7.43	5
5	23 April 2008	7.85	5
6	30 April 2008	7.28	5
7	7 May 2008	7.17	5
8	14 May 2008	7.11	6
9	21 May 2008	5.73	9
10	28 May 2008	6.84	6
11	4 June 2008	7.94	4
12	11 June 2008	9.29	1

Specials

Episode	Airdate	Viewers (millions)	BBC Two/One weekly ranking
The Worst Decisions Ever	3 April 2008	2.07	15
Motor Mouths	18 April 2008	1.73	25
The Final Five	2 June 2008	—N/a	—N/a
Why I Fired Them	8 June 2008	—N/a	—N/a
