= List of OK! TV episodes =

OK! TV was an early evening magazine programme, broadcast Monday-Friday at 18:25 on Channel 5. It was presented by Jeff Brazier and Jenny Frost who replaced original hosts Kate Walsh and Matt Johnson on 17 August 2011, when the show moved to the Big Brother compound. It was produced by Sky News. The programme was first broadcast on 14 February 2011.

== Episodes ==
| No. | Studio guests, performers and notes | Original release date | Viewers |
|---|---|---|---|
| 1 | Louis Walsh | 14 February 2011 | 449,000 |
| 2 | Patsy Kensit | 15 February 2011 | 300,000 |
| 3 | Boy George | 16 February 2011 | 400,000 |
| 4 | JLS (also performed Eyes Wide Shut) | 17 February 2011 | N/A |
| 5 | Keith Lemon | 18 February 2011 | N/A |
| 6 | Mark Wright, Kayla Collins and Ashton Kutcher | 21 February 2011 | N/A |
| 7 | Janice Dickinson and Colin and Justin | 22 February 2011 | N/A |
| 8 | Matt Smith | 23 February 2011 | N/A |
| 9 | Coleen Nolan | 28 February 2011 | N/A |
| 10 | The Only Way Is Essex cast | 1 March 2011 | N/A |
| 11 | Josie Gibson | 2 March 2011 | 400,000 |
| 12 | Jedward (also performed Lipstick) | 3 March 2011 | N/A |
| 13 | Michael Ball | 4 March 2011 | N/A |
| 14 | Janice Dickinson | 7 March 2011 | 400,000 |
| 15 | Dane Bowers and Olly Murs (also performed Heart on My Sleeve) | 8 March 2011 | N/A |
| 16 | Shayne Ward, The Wanted and McFly (also performed That's The Truth) | 9 March 2011 | 300,000 |
| 17 | Deena Payne | 14 March 2011 | N/A |
| 18 | Craig Revel Horwood and Ed Westwick | 15 March 2011 | N/A |
| 19 | Gemma Arterton and Camilla Kerslake | 16 March 2011 | N/A |
| 20 | Jake Canuso | 17 March 2011 | 300,000 |
| 21 | Bradley Cooper and Denise Welch | 18 March 2011 | N/A |
| 22 | Mary Byrne and Jamie Bell | 21 March 2011 | 300,000 |
| 23 | Jay Sean and Eliza Doolittle (also performed Mr Medicine) | 22 March 2011 | N/A |
| 24 | N Dubz (also performed Morning Star) | 23 March 2011 | N/A |
| 25 | Josie Gibson | 24 March 2011 | N/A |
| 26 | Jeff Brazier and Dominic Cooper | 25 March 2011 | N/A |
| 27 | Carol McGiffin and The Hoosiers (also performed Bumpy Ride) | 28 March 2011 | 200,000 |
| 28 | Donna Air and Jessie J | 29 March 2011 | N/A |
| 29 | Joe Calzaghe | 30 March 2011 | N/A |
| 30 | Wynne Evans | 31 March 2011 | N/A |
| 31 | Channing Tatum | 1 April 2011 | N/A |
| 32 | Melanie Hill and Vanessa Hudgens | 4 April 2011 | N/A |
| 33 | Moby and Jodie Connor | 5 April 2011 | N/A |
| 34 | Josie Gibson, Christopher Biggins and The Overtones (also performed Rihanna's Only Girl (In The World)) | 6 April 2011 | N/A |
| 35 | Keith Duffy | 7 April 2011 | N/A |
| 36 | Amanda Seyfried and Katie Piper | 8 April 2011 | N/A |
| 37 | Matt Evers | 11 April 2011 | N/A |
| 38 | Jessica Lowndes | 12 April 2011 | N/A |
| 39 | Josie Gibson and Warwick Davis | 13 April 2011 | N/A |
| 40 | Laura Hamilton, Brooke Vincent and the cast of Merlin | 14 April 2011 | N/A |
| 41 | Stefanie Powers | 15 April 2011 | N/A |
| 42 | Laura Hamilton and Dionne Bromfield (also performed Yeah Right) | 18 April 2011 | 300,000 |
| 43 | Louie Spence and Jackie Collins | 19 April 2011 | N/A |
| 44 | Josie Gibson and Russell Brand | 20 April 2011 | N/A |
| 45 | Helen Mirren | 21 April 2011 | N/A |
| 46 | Royal Wedding special | 26 April 2011 | N/A |
| 47 | Royal Wedding special | 27 April 2011 | N/A |
| 48 | Royal Wedding special | 28 April 2011 | N/A |
| 49 | Royal Wedding special | 29 April 2011 | 500,000 |
| 50 | Ian Smith | 3 May 2011 | N/A |
| 51 | Gethin Jones | 4 May 2011 | N/A |
| 52 | Fiona Phillips | 5 May 2011 | N/A |
| 53 | Alison Hammond | 6 May 2011 | N/A |
| 54 | Sisco Gomez | 9 May 2011 | 300,000 |
| 55 | Sinitta and Danyl Johnson | 10 May 2011 | N/A |
| 56 | Brigitte Nielson | 11 May 2011 | N/A |
| 57 | Bucks Fizz | 12 May 2011 | N/A |
| 58 | Cast of The Only Way Is Essex | 13 May 2011 | N/A |
| 59 | Kimberly Wyatt | 16 May 2011 | 300,000 |
| 60 | Ashley Tisdale | 17 May 2011 | N/A |
| 61 | Josie Gibson | 18 May 2011 | N/A |
| 62 | Joey Essex | 19 May 2011 | N/A |
| 63 | Arabella Wier | 20 May 2011 | N/A |
| 64 | Harry Derbridge | 23 May 2011 | 300,000 |
| 65 | Trevor Donovan | 24 May 2011 | N/A |
| 66 | Jonathan Wilkes | 25 May 2011 | N/A |
| 67 | Phil Tufnell | 26 May 2011 | N/A |
| 68 | JLS | 27 May 2011 | N/A |
| 69 | Hanson | 31 May 2011 | N/A |
| 70 | Trevor Donovan | 1 June 2011 | N/A |
| 71 | Arlene Phillips | 2 June 2011 | N/A |
| 72 | Owain Yeoman and Phil Tufnell | 3 June 2011 | N/A |
| 73 | Claire Richards | 6 June 2011 | 300,000 |
| 74 | Lauren Goodger and Tom Hanks | 7 June 2011 | N/A |
| 75 | New Bounce and Wonderland | 8 June 2011 | N/A |
| 76 | Matthew Morrison | 9 June 2011 | N/A |
| 77 | Keri Hilson (also performs Pretty Girl Rock) | 10 June 2011 | N/A |
| 78 | Bruce Forsyth | 13 June 2011 | N/A |
| 79 | Nicole Scherzinger | 14 June 2011 | N/A |
| 80 | Shane Lynch and Amanda Holden | 15 June 2011 | N/A |
| 81 | Ryan Reynolds | 16 June 2011 | N/A |
| 82 | Henry Winkler | 17 June 2011 | N/A |
| 83 | Kim Kardashian | 20 June 2011 | N/A |
| 84 | Tony Blackburn | 21 June 2011 | N/A |
| 85 | Andy Bell | 22 June 2011 | N/A |
| 86 | Linda Robson | 23 June 2011 | N/A |
| 87 | Jason Derulo (also performed Don't Wanna Go Home) | 24 June 2011 | N/A |
| 88 | Tom Hanks | 27 June 2011 | N/A |
| 89 | Dom Joly and Cory Monteith | 28 June 2011 | N/A |
| 90 | Richard Blackwood | 29 June 2011 | N/A |
| 91 | Ian Watkins and Faye Tozer | 30 June 2011 | N/A |
| 92 | Charley Speed | 1 July 2011 | N/A |
| 93 | Lily Allen | 4 July 2011 | N/A |
| 94 | Jedward | 5 July 2011 | N/A |
| 95 | Shabby Katchadourian and Danni Orsi | 6 July 2011 | 300,000 |
| 96 | Peter Andre (also performed Perfect Night) | 7 July 2011 | N/A |
| 97 | Corey Feldman | 8 July 2011 | N/A |
| 98 | Beverley Knight | 11 July 2011 | N/A |
| 99 | Carol Vorderman | 12 July 2011 | N/A |
| 100 | Bunmi Mojekwu | 13 July 2011 | N/A |
| 101 | East 17 | 14 July 2011 | N/A |
| 102 | The Wanted (also performed Glad You Came) | 15 July 2011 | N/A |
| 103 | Jedward (also performed Bad Behaviour) | 18 July 2011 | N/A |
| 104 | Jon Lee | 19 July 2011 | N/A |
| 105 | Wagner | 20 July 2011 | N/A |
| 106 | Joe McElderry | 21 July 2011 | N/A |
| 107 | Lady Gaga and Brian Dowling | 22 July 2011 | N/A |
| 108 | Amy Winehouse Tribute Special | 25 July 2011 | N/A |
| 109 | Ben Shepherd | 26 July 2011 | N/A |
| 110 | Dan Ewing | 27 July 2011 | N/A |
| 111 | JLS (also performed She Makes Me Wanna) | 28 July 2011 | N/A |
| 112 | Katie Price | 29 July 2011 | N/A |
| 113 | Rhydian (also performed Parade) | 1 August 2011 | N/A |
| 114 | Shayne Ward | 2 August 2011 | N/A |
| 115 | Stuart Baggs | 3 August 2011 | N/A |
| 116 | Charlie Simpson (also performed Parachutes) | 4 August 2011 | N/A |
| 117 | Joe Jonas | 5 August 2011 | N/A |
| 118 | Nicki Chapman | 8 August 2011 | N/A |
| 119 | Darren Hayes | 9 August 2011 | N/A |
| 120 | Mary Jess | 10 August 2011 | N/A |
| 121 | Sam Pepper and Spencer Smith | 11 August 2011 | N/A |
| 122 | Tamara Ecclestone | 12 August 2011 | N/A |
| 123 | Jason Donovan | 15 August 2011 | N/A |
| 124 | Patricia Field (Sex and the City stylist) | 16 August 2011 | N/A |
| 125 | Emma Willis and Josie Gibson (Jeff Brazier and Jenny Frost's first episode) | 17 August 2011 | N/A |
| 126 | Brian Dowling, Alex Reid and Vanessa Feltz (Celebrity Big Brother launched this night at 9pm) | 18 August 2011 | N/A |
| 127 | Alice Levine and Jamie East | 19 August 2011 | N/A |
| 128 | Brian Belo and Olly Murs | 22 August 2011 | N/A |
| 129 | Vanessa Feltz and Joe McElderry | 23 August 2011 | N/A |
| 130 | Keith Lemon and Emma Willis | 24 August 2011 | N/A |
| 131 | David Hasselhoff and Nikki Grahame | 25 August 2011 | N/A |
| 132 | Gary Beadle and Charlotte-Letitia Crosby (from Geordie Shore) | 26 August 2011 | N/A |
| 133 | Sally Bercow | 30 August 2011 | N/A |
| 134 | Brian Dowling and Emma Willis | 31 August 2011 | N/A |
| 135 | Example | 1 September 2011 | N/A |
| 136 | Harry Derbidge | 2 September 2011 | N/A |
| 137 | Justin Timberlake and Mila Kunis (from Friends with Benefits) | 5 September 2011 | N/A |
| 138 | Chantelle Houghton | 6 September 2011 | N/A |
| 139 | Mark Wright | 7 September 2011 | N/A |
| 140 | Pamela Bach | 8 September 2011 | N/A |
| 141 | Jedward | 9 September 2011 | N/A |
| 142 | Kerry Katona and Amy Childs | 12 September 2011 | N/A |
| 143 | One Direction | 13 September 2011 | N/A |
| 144 | Lucien Laviscount | 14 September 2011 | N/A |
| 145 | Bobby Sabel, Vincent Simone and Flavia Cacace | 15 September 2011 | N/A |
| 146 | Kimberly Wyatt | 16 September 2011 | N/A |
| 147 | Tashie Jackson, Brian Belo, Liz McClarnon | 19 September 2011 | N/A |
| 148 | Vanessa Feltz, Alison Hammond, Britney Spears | 20 September 2011 | N/A |
| 149 | Dappy | 21 September 2011 | N/A |
| 150 | Kasabian | 22 September 2011 | N/A |
| 151 | The finalists of Britain and Ireland's Next Top Model | 23 September 2011 | N/A |
| 152 | Rebeckah Vaughan, Brian Belo | 26 September 2011 | N/A |
| 153 | Keith Lemon | 27 September 2011 | N/A |
| 154 | Lisa Scott-Lee | 28 September 2011 | N/A |
| 155 | Adele Silva | 29 September 2011 | N/A |
| 156 | The cast of Geordie Shore | 30 September 2011 | N/A |
| 157 | Heaven Afrika | 3 October 2011 | N/A |
| 158 | Clare Buckfield, John Pickard | 4 October 2011 | N/A |
| 159 | Emma Willis | 5 October 2011 | N/A |
| 160 | Mark Henderson | 6 October 2011 | N/A |
| 161 | Shayne Ward | 7 October 2011 | N/A |
| 162 | Katie Price | 10 October 2011 | N/A |
| 163 | Matt Cardle | 11 October 2011 | N/A |
| 164 | Emma Willis, Ray Meagher | 12 October 2011 | N/A |
| 165 | A1 | 13 October 2011 | N/A |
| 166 | Joe Jonas | 14 October 2011 | N/A |
| 167 | Sinitta | 17 October 2011 | N/A |
| 168 | Michelle Heaton | 18 October 2011 | N/A |
| 169 | Will Ferrell | 19 October 2011 | N/A |
| 170 | Brian Dowling, Rufus Hound | 20 October 2011 | N/A |
| 171 | Matt Goss | 21 October 2011 | N/A |
| 172 | Anton Murphy | 24 October 2011 | N/A |
| 173 | Goldie | 25 October 2011 | N/A |
| 174 | Emma Willis | 26 October 2011 | N/A |
| 175 | Jemma Palmer, Steps | 27 October 2011 | N/A |
| 176 | Ronan Parke | 28 October 2011 | N/A |
| 177 | Harry Blake, Brian Belo | 31 October 2011 | N/A |
| 178 | TBA | 1 November 2011 | N/A |
| 179 | Emma Willis, Tamara Ecclestone | 2 November 2011 | N/A |
| 180 | Beverley Knight | 3 November 2011 | N/A |
| 181 | Charlie Simpson | 4 November 2011 | N/A |
| 182 | Sinitta, Faye Palmer | 7 November 2011 | N/A |
| 183 | Darius Campbell | 8 November 2011 | N/A |
| 184 | Tinchy Stryder | 9 November 2011 | N/A |
| 185 | Gina G | 10 November 2011 | N/A |
| 186 | Brian Dowling, Tom O'Connell | 11 November 2011 | N/A |
| 187 | Nicola McLean, Aaron Allard | 14 November 2011 | N/A |
| 188 | Alex Lee, Sam Attwater | 15 November 2011 | N/A |
| 189 | Jay McKray, Louise Cliffe | 16 November 2011 | N/A |
| 190 | TBA | 17 November 2011 | N/A |
| 191 | Cliff Richard | 18 November 2011 | N/A |
| 192 | Dean Piper, Jedward | 21 November 2011 | N/A |
| 193 | TBA | 22 November 2011 | N/A |
| 194 | Russell Watson | 23 November 2011 | N/A |
| 195 | Status Quo | 24 November 2011 | N/A |
| 196 | Samantha Faiers, Harry Derbidge | 25 November 2011 | N/A |
| 197 | Kirk Norcross | 28 November 2011 | N/A |
| 198 | Hanson | 29 November 2011 | N/A |
| 199 | Michelle Williams | 30 November 2011 | N/A |
| 200 | Kerry Katona | 5 December 2011 | N/A |
| 201 | Charley Boorman | 6 December 2011 | N/A |
| 202 | Paddy Doherty | 7 December 2011 | N/A |
| 203 | Amy Childs | 8 December 2011 | N/A |
| 204 | Jessica-Jane Clement | 9 December 2011 | N/A |
| 205 | Joe McElderry | 12 December 2011 | N/A |
| 206 | Boy George | 13 December 2011 | N/A |
| 207 | James Argent, Lydia Rose Bright, Jessica Wright | 14 December 2011 | N/A |
| 208 | Matt Cardle | 15 December 2011 | N/A |
| 209 | Jessica Lowndes and The Wombles | 16 December 2011 | N/A |
