= Glamour Girl (novel) =

2008 novel by Kerry Katona and Fanny Blake

- First edition
- Author: Kerry Katona; Fanny Blake
- Language: English
- Genre: Novel
- Publisher: Ebury Press
- Publication date: 2 October 2008
- Publication place: United Kingdom
- Media type: Print (hardcover, paperback)
- Pages: 320
- ISBN: 978-0091923259
- Preceded by: The Footballer's Wife

Glamour Girl is a novel written by Kerry Katona and Fanny Blake. It is the third in a trilogy of novels written by Katona and Blake and is a follow-up from their first two novels Tough Love and The Footballer's Wife. It was released 2 October 2008. In June 2008, Katona admitted that she had not actually written Glamour Girl or her previous novels, in part because she is dyslexic.

== Plot introduction ==
Leanne has turned the tables on her career and is now managing her little sister Jodie's glamour career. Jodie will do anything to get to where she wants to be and is determined to be even more famous than Leanne ever was. So she hits all the parties with one thing in mind – get noticed. She decides that to top it all off she wants the perfect man – Ben Ridely, the owner of a leading property company. But she's too busy spending his money to realise that it's not coming in the legal way. Jodie needs to be careful because if she's not she could end up in big trouble.
