= When Paddy Met Sally =

- Genre: Factual
- Starring: Paddy Doherty; Sally Bercow
- Country of origin: United Kingdom
- Original language: English

Production
- Executive producer: Paul Coueslant
- Producer: Charlotte Fitzpatrick
- Camera setup: Multiple-camera setup
- Running time: 2 x 1-hour
- Production company: Endemol

Original release
- Network: Channel 5
- Release: 9 January – 16 January 2012

When Paddy Met Sally is a two-part television documentary shown on Channel 5 in the UK featuring Irish Traveller and Celebrity Big Brother 2011 winner Paddy Doherty and Sally Bercow, wife of the Speaker of the House of Commons. The show is similar to Wife Swap.

The pair met in the Big Brother house in August 2011 and became unlikely friends. For the two one-hour episodes of When Paddy Met Sally, Bercow moved into Doherty's chalet on his travellers' site in north Wales, living by his rules in episode one and hers in episode two. The programme first aired on 9 and 16 January 2012.

== Ratings ==
Episode No.	Airdate	Total viewers	Weekly channel ranking
1	9 January 2012	1.18m	17
2	16 January 2012	1.10m	25
