= The Footballer's Wife =

2008 novel by Kerry Katona and Fanny Blake

- Cover of the hardback edition
- Author: Kerry Katona; Fanny Blake
- Language: English
- Genre: Novel
- Publisher: Ebury Press
- Publication date: 3 April 2008
- Publication place: United Kingdom
- Media type: Print (hardcover, paperback)
- Pages: 320
- ISBN: 978-0-09-192324-2
- Preceded by: Tough Love
- Followed by: Glamour Girl

The Footballer's Wife is a novel written by Kerry Katona. It is a follow-up from her first novel Tough Love. It was released 3 April 2008. Originally called Rough Justice, Ebury made a last minute change of name to The Footballer's Wife, for undisclosed reasons.

== Plot ==
The original cover.

The story continues the events of Tough Love, focusing on Charley. Having recently married her husband, Joel Brady, she enjoys a luxurious lifestyle that includes high-society parties, financial independence through her husband's credit card, and a million-pound penthouse. However, behind closed doors, Charley experiences domestic abuse from Joel during arguments. Although she recognizes the need to leave the marriage, she struggles with lingering feelings for him and the pressure of having married hastily against her family's wishes.

== Critical reception ==
Heat magazine said of Katona:"If Jackie Collins had grown up on the Shameless estate, this is pretty much what we think she'd come up with... compulsive".
