= Jemma Palmer =

English model and professional wrestler

- Palmer in 2010 with Pro-Wrestling: EVE

Personal information
- Born: Jemma Sara Palmer; 10 April 1983 (age 43) Tamworth, Staffordshire, England

Professional wrestling career
- Ring name(s): Jemma Palmer; Inferno; Penelope Carwin
- Billed height: 5 ft 6 in (1.68 m)
- Billed weight: 128 lb (58 kg; 9.1 st)
- Trained by: Ultimate Pro Wrestling
- Debut: 2005
- Retired: 2011

Jemma Sara Palmer (born 10 April 1983) is an English businesswoman, television personality, model and former professional wrestler. She is best known by the name Inferno, which she used in the 2008 British television series Gladiators. She mainly worked on the British independent circuit during her professional wrestling career, with a brief stint at WWE, where she was assigned to their development territory Florida Championship Wrestling (FCW). She also appeared on the twelfth season of the UK version of Big Brother.

== Professional modelling career ==
Palmer grew up modelling under the encouragement of her mother, winning the Little Miss Midlands and Miss Littlesea competitions as a child. As an adult, she entered a number of competitions, becoming a finalist in the 2006 Musclemania Britain which she later won, Miss Hawaiian Tropic, Ms USA Dream Bikini Body and Miss Maxim UK competitions. She also came third in the Maxim Little Black Book UK modelling competition.

She went on to model in many publications including Muscle & Fitness, Nuts, Loaded, WWE Magazine, and FHM.

Following Palmer's success at gaining celebrity status within the fitness and entertainment industries, she now also judges the types of contests that launched her career. She announced that she would be judging the 2017 Bodypower model search.

== Television appearances ==
=== Gladiators ===
While her mother encouraged Palmer into modelling, her father encouraged her into athletics. She enrolled in the cadets where she began to train in climbing, abseiling and amateur wrestling. She would later gain a purple belt in submission wrestling.

As a fan of Gladiators growing up, when rumours mounted of a revival show in 2008, she began sending promotional material to television companies. Her wrestling manager landed her an audition for the similarly timed American Gladiators revival, but she received a call up for Sky1's British version days later and passed their fitness test. She performed in both series of Gladiators under the name Inferno, sporting red hair and a fiery, flirtatious personality. Despite not appearing on the American version, BBC America aired Gladiators in the United States. As a cadet, she also later appeared on Sky1's Battle of The Forces which pitted the British Army, Royal Navy and RAF against each other.

Some of the most popular Gladiators characters, including Gladiator Inferno, were imortalised as action figures for fans to purchase and are now collectables.

=== Big Brother ===
Palmer became a contestant on the twelfth series of Big Brother, replacing Mark Henderson, who chose to walk on Day 27. She was reunited with her sister Faye, who had been in the competition since the beginning. Much of her time in the house was centred around a feud with Aaron Allard-Morgan, who was dating her sister at the time. Despite this, she did not want to ruin her sister's experience in the house, and chose to walk on Day 48. As she had been up for eviction, this forced Big Brother to change course, and in a twist move, it was announced that any housemates who had been nominated (which included Faye), were now up for eviction. Ultimately, Faye was saved by the public, but was evicted from the house a week later.

Having previously stated that her age was 25, Big Brother outed Palmer's actual age as 28, following a shopping task in which housemates had to decipher the correct combination to secure the rationed food for the week. Big Brother's clue was "Jem's age (28) / the number of people whom Aaron had snogged" (Tom+Faye+Maisy = 3), giving the number 2803 which opened the lock. As she was lying about her age, the lock could not be opened, so the remaining three housemates walked from the task room, failing the task.

== Professional wrestling career ==
=== Independent circuit (2005–2011) ===
Along with her other exploits, Palmer also was a fan of professional wrestling, particularly the original incarnation of D-Generation X. In 2005, she began to appear for the Frontier Wrestling Alliance (FWA) mainly as a valet for Doug Williams. This led to her having a try out match with World Wrestling Entertainment (WWE), alongside Katarina Waters who went on to become Katie Lea Burchill. Although she was not signed, she was later offered a scholarship to train at Ultimate Pro Wrestling. During her time on the circuit, Palmer filmed a reality television show based on professional wrestling as one of the three lead stars.

After much training, she was booked for her debut match against Jetta at Pro-Wrestling: EVE's first show on 8 May 2010 in Sudbury, Suffolk. Before her match with Jetta, she suffered an injury in her hand but wrestled the match anyway, with a storyline written in that Jetta attacked her and goaded her into a match while she was explaining the injury to the crowd. The referee stopped the contest and awarded it to Jetta out of concern for Palmer's health.

Palmer joined the British wrestling company United Kingdom Wrestling (UKW), where she became the UKW Women's Champion. Here, she was introduced to the crowd as "Inferno Jemma Palmer" and was accompanied to the ring by her sister Faye.

=== WWE ===
On 29 June 2009, it was announced that Palmer had signed a contract with WWE. She was assigned to WWE's development territory Florida Championship Wrestling (FCW), and was set to wrestle under the ring name Penelope Carwin. However, visa issues prevented her from ever making an appearance for the promotion.

== Business interests ==
In October 2011, Palmer invested in a company called Buff Naked Butlers, which provides semi-naked butlers for events in Wales and England. She also part owns cocktail and events company Tipsy Parties.

In November 2017, Palmer launched tech company Infinitus Unlimited, a business consultancy providing business automation and workflow streamlining.

== Championships and achievements ==
- Pro Evolution Wrestling
  - Pro Evolution Women's Championship (1 time)
- United Kingdom Wrestling
  - UKW Women's Championship (1 time)
  - Pro EVW Women's Champion (1 time)
  - AWE Women's Champion (1 time)
