= Big Brother (British TV series) series 12 =

Coordinates: 51°39′23″N 0°16′02″W

Big Brother
- Series 12
- Series twelve logo
- Presented by: Brian Dowling
- No. of days: 64
- No. of housemates: 15
- Winner: Aaron Allard-Morgan
- Runner-up: Jay McKray
- Companion shows: Big Brother's Bit on the Side
- No. of episodes: 71

Release
- Original network: Channel 5
- Original release: 9 September – 11 November 2011

Series chronology
- ← Previous; Series 11 Next → Series 13

Big Brother 2011, also known as Big Brother 12, is the twelfth series of the British reality television series Big Brother and the first not to be broadcast on Channel 4. It was broadcast on Channel 5 for the first time since the show's transfer from Channel 4. It launched on 9 September 2011 with an hour and a half-long special launch show, the day after the final of Celebrity Big Brother 8. It was hosted by Brian Dowling, the winner of Big Brother 2 and Ultimate Big Brother. This was the first presenter change since the departure of Davina McCall in September 2010. The series ran for 64 days, ending on 11 November 2011 when the winner, Aaron Allard-Morgan, won half of the £100,000 prize fund, with the remainder split between the five finalists. The runner up was Jay McKray.

The series differed from the Channel 4 version in having the celebrity edition before the main series, with the latter running in the autumn rather than the traditional summer-long run. The series reverted to its traditional pattern a year later when Big Brother 13 aired in the summer of 2012. In 2018 the series reverted to the 2011 format again with Celebrity Big Brother 22 airing before Big Brother 19.

There were 14 original housemates, seven men and seven women all aged between 18 and 30. Much of the series concentrated on the romantic relationships that developed between the housemates during their time in the house.

The series was sponsored by skincare brand Freederm and was the first to use online voting via Facebook credits.

== Housemates ==
Jemma Palmer

Name	Age on entry	Hometown	Day entered	Day exited	Result
Aaron Allard-Morgan	30	Weston-super-Mare, Somerset	1	64	Winner
Jay McKray	27	Newcastle	1	64	Runner-up
Alex Lee	18	South Shields, Tyne and Wear	1	64	3rd place
Louise Cliffe	25	Manchester	1	64	4th place
Thomas "Tom" O'Connell	20	Solihull, West Midlands	1	63	Evicted
Faye Palmer	22	Tamworth, Staffordshire	1	57	Evicted
Harry Blake	23	Cheshire	1	50	Evicted
Jemma "Jem" Palmer	25	Birmingham	29	48	Walked
Anton Murphy	23	London	1	43	Evicted
Aden Theobald	19	Enfield, London	1	36	Evicted
Hannah "Maisy" James	19	Kent	1	29	Evicted
Mark Henderson	28	Berkshire	1	27	Walked
Heaven Afrika	30	London	1	22	Evicted
Rebeckah Vaughan	28	Liverpool	1	15	Evicted
Tashie Jackson	21	Oxford	1	8	Evicted

== House guests ==
=== Pamela Anderson ===
On 8 September, the evening before the launch night, presenter Brian Dowling confirmed a "surprise guest" twist involving Canadian model and Baywatch star Pamela Anderson who would enter the house on launch night to host a party and set a number of tasks for the housemates during a four-day stay.

=== Ex-housemates ===
On Day 31, ex-housemate Rebeckah re-entered the house to host a date with Tom who won the rendezvous with her as part of the day's 'Let's get smashed' task. She attempted to communicate with her former house "boyfriend" Aden who was listening outside the door with Anton. However, this was against the task rules and she was admonished by Big Brother. On Day 40, Tashie Jackson returned to the house to participate in the "Scream" shopping task, having previously returned covertly to do a bungee jump in Week 2.

=== Paranormal Activity 3 premiere night ===
On the night of Day 41, a number of ex-celebrity and main series housemates and other VIP guests re-entered the Big Brother house to preview the horror movie Paranormal Activity 3 at a special red carpet premiere showing of the film. They joined current housemates Aaron, Jem, Louise and Tom who had won places at the event during an earlier task. Guests attending the event included Celebrity Big Brother 8 winner Paddy Doherty and fellow housemates Bobby Sabel and Lucien Laviscount. Also attending were former Big Brother UK housemates Nikki Grahame and Imogen Thomas, Hollyoaks actors Kieron Richardson and Bronagh Waugh, singer Michelle Heaton and reality show star and author Katie Price.

=== Kim Woodburn ===
In the penultimate week of the series, on Day 55, celebrity cleaning expert and former How Clean Is Your House? presenter Kim Woodburn entered the house to inspect the state of domestic hygiene and to set a shopping task called It'll be all white to keep a pre-rewarded luxury budget of £300. She berated the housemates for their messy ways and ordered them to clean up the house. She also set them a shopping task to wear white outfits and keep them clean during a series of hazardous mini-tasks. She promised to return at the end of the day to judge their efforts with the cleaning and the shopping tasks, with money deducted for soiling the outfits. Having awarded a reduced shopping budget of £150, Woodburn awarded a bonus of £50 for the housemates' cleaning efforts.

== Nominations table ==
	Week 1	Week 2	Week 3	Week 4	Week 5	Week 6	Week 7	Week 8	Week 9		Nominations received
Aaron	Tashie, Anton	Heaven, Rebeckah	Anton, Aden	Jay, Anton	Anton, Jay	Anton, Jay	~~Jem~~, Jay	Louise, Tom	Winner (Day 64)		25
Jay	Harry, Aaron	Rebeckah, Heaven	Maisy, Heaven	Faye, Mark	Aaron, Harry	Jem, Tom	Aaron, Faye	Faye, Aaron	Runner-up (Day 64)		14
Alex	Anton, Tashie	Heaven, Maisy	Anton, Aden	Maisy, Faye	Aden, Anton	Anton, Aaron	Faye, ~~Jem~~	Jay, Faye	Third place (Day 64)		6
Louise	Tom, Alex	Maisy, Rebeckah	Maisy, Aaron	Maisy, Faye	Faye, Aden	Harry, Faye	Aaron, Harry	Faye, Aaron	Fourth place (Day 64)		5
Tom	Louise, Harry	Rebeckah, Maisy	Aden, Aaron	Aden, Maisy	Anton, Aden	Anton, Louise	Aaron, ~~Jem~~	Louise, Jay	Evicted (Day 63)		6
Faye	Harry, Aaron	Heaven, Rebeckah	Aaron, Heaven	Anton, Aaron	Anton, Jay	Anton, Jay	Harry, Aaron	Alex, Louise	Evicted (Day 57)		16
Harry	Aden, Tashie	Rebeckah, Aden	Heaven, Tom	Faye, Maisy	Jay, Anton	Anton, Jay	Jay, ~~Jem~~	Evicted (Day 50)			11
Jem	Not in House				Exempt	Anton, Jay	Aaron, Harry	Walked (Day 48)			6
Anton	Mark, Aaron	Heaven, Rebeckah	Aaron, Heaven	Faye, Maisy	Aaron, Faye	Alex, Jem	Evicted (Day 43)				18
Aden	Alex, Tom	Heaven, Tom	Heaven, Aaron	Aaron, Faye	Aaron, Faye	Evicted (Day 36)					12
Maisy	Alex, Mark	Alex, Mark	Mark, Aden	Aaron, Mark	Evicted (Day 29)						14
Mark	Anton, Tashie	Rebeckah, Maisy	Maisy, Aden	Aden, Maisy	Walked (Day 27)						6
Heaven	Harry, Tashie	Faye, Jay	Aaron, Maisy	Evicted (Day 22)							12
Rebeckah	Harry, Aaron	Jay, Heaven	Evicted (Day 15)								8
Tashie	Harry, Aaron	Evicted (Day 8)									5
Notes	1	2	none		3, 4	5	6	7	8		
Against public vote	Aaron, Harry, Tashie	Heaven, Rebeckah	Aaron, Aden, Heaven	Faye, Maisy	Aaron, Aden, Anton, Faye, Jay	Anton, Harry, Jay, Jem	Aaron, Faye, Harry, Jay	Faye, Louise	Aaron, Alex, Jay, Louise, Tom		
Walked	none			Mark	none		Jem	none			
Evicted	Tashie; Fewest votes to save	Rebeckah; Fewest votes to save	Heaven; Fewest votes to save	Maisy; Fewest votes to save	Aden; Fewest votes to save	Anton; Fewest votes to save	Harry; Fewest votes to save	Faye; Fewest votes to save	Tom; Fewest votes (out of 5)	Louise; Fewest votes (out of 4)	
Evicted	Tashie; Fewest votes to save	Rebeckah; Fewest votes to save	Heaven; Fewest votes to save	Maisy; Fewest votes to save	Aden; Fewest votes to save	Anton; Fewest votes to save	Harry; Fewest votes to save	Faye; Fewest votes to save	Alex; Fewest votes (out of 3)	Jay; Fewest votes (out of 2)	
Evicted	Tashie; Fewest votes to save	Rebeckah; Fewest votes to save	Heaven; Fewest votes to save	Maisy; Fewest votes to save	Aden; Fewest votes to save	Anton; Fewest votes to save	Harry; Fewest votes to save	Faye; Fewest votes to save	Aaron; Most votes to win		

Notes

- ^Note 1: Pamela Anderson was able to give immunity to four housemates during her stay by giving them a Golden Swimsuit. Heaven, Aden and Maisy received the first three Golden Swimsuits, however the final Golden Housemate, Rebeckah, had to choose one of the other three and remove their privilege — she chose Aden, hence he was no longer immune from eviction.
- ^Note 2: Having won an endurance task on Day 9, Harry won immunity from that week's nominations. While he could not be nominated, he could still nominate.
- ^Note 3: Prior to nominating, the housemates were told by Big Brother that they could openly discuss nominations until further notice.
- ^Note 4: As a new Housemate, Jem could not nominate and could not be nominated by her fellow Housemates.
- ^Note 5: Anton and Jay received the most nominations but in a twist by Big Brother were "fake evicted" and moved to a secret room, "The Crypt", in which they could watch their fellow housemates on television screens. Anton and Jay had the power to decide which two housemates faced this week's eviction with them, provided they passed a secret mission. The two passed the secret mission and returned to the house. Anton chose Jem, and Jay chose Harry.
- ^Note 6: The housemates' friends and family nominated on their behalf. Aaron and Jem received the most nominations, however, Jem walked before the eviction had taken place, so Big Brother decided that any other housemate who received a nomination would also be up for eviction this week. Therefore, Aaron, Faye, Harry and Jay faced the public vote this week.
- ^Note 7: Housemates had to nominate face-to-face this week. Every time a housemate received a nomination they received an electric shock.
- ^Note 8: During the final week the public voted for who they wanted to win, rather than save. The Housemate with the fewest votes was evicted the day before the final. This Housemate was Tom, leaving Aaron, Alex, Jay and Louise in the final four.

== Weekly summary ==
Week 1	Entrances	On Day 1, Mark, Maisy, Aaron, Heaven, Tom, Tashie, Aden, Alex, Harry, Rebeckah, Anton, Faye, Jay, and Louise entered the House. They were joined by celebrity houseguest Pamela Anderson, who was waiting for them in the garden.
Week 1	Tasks	Day 1: The housemates were given tasks to try to impress celebrity houseguest Pamela Anderson. Anyone who impressed Pamela received a golden swimsuit to wear at all times. Unknown to them, the golden swimsuit also gave them immunity from being nominated. Heaven won the first swimsuit at the launch night VIP party as Pamela found her the most entertaining guest.; Day 2: Pamela set the housemates a speed-dating task to impress her as best date in the sauna. Aden won the task and gained the second golden swimsuit, as Pamela found him the most datable housemate.; Day 3: Maisy won the third golden swim suit after winning the Baywatch-themed endurance competition in which all except Heaven and Aden competed in red swimsuits in the garden beach area.; Day 4: Rebeckah won a golden swimsuit for being the most impressive housemate during the "Pick me Pamela" task judged by Pamela, Heaven and Maisy in the garden. However, she had to replace one of the three winners with herself and that housemate would lose their immunity from being nominated. Rebeckah chose Aden.; Day 6: Housemates competed in a "Battle of the Brains" shopping task. Part 1 involved the housemates divided into "boys" and "girls" teams dressed in school uniforms. They had to calculate sums on blackboards using fish stuffed into barrels of stinking fish paste. The boys won, gaining control of the shopping list. Part 2 involved them answering two general knowledge questions at £50 for each correct answer. The boys team won the house a total budget of £350.; Alex won her individual secret task to walk 2 miles around the house. She won a luxury basket of cosmetics for the female housemates.
Week 1	Punishments	As a punishment for failing the "Battle of the Brains" task, the women were given a lunch of "brain food" which consisted of tinned sardines on toast while the men ate sushi for lunch. For failing the overall task, the women had to wear "pea brain" hats and face a gunging with "brain sick" by members of the men's schoolboy team. The "schoolboys" spun a wheel with the female's faces on it and when it alighted on a victim, they had to throw buckets of the brain sick over the selected female.; After the Battle of the Brains task, the men's schoolboys' team were admonished by Big Brother for throwing the buckets of brain sick about against the house rules. The housemates faced a £350 budget for shopping following the deduction of £50 for this breach of task rules.
Week 1	Nominations	The housemates nominated for the first time. Aaron, Harry and Tashie received the most nominations and faced the public vote.
Week 1	Exits	On Day 4, Pamela Anderson left the house.; On Day 8, Tashie was evicted from the house, receiving the fewest votes to save.
Week 2
Week 2	Tasks	On Day 9, the housemates took part in an endurance task called "Clucking Hell" which involved them dressing up in chicken suits and sitting in a chicken coop for as long as possible. At certain time intervals, housemates would be provided with popcorn in a trough, which they then had to eat in an allotted amount of time. Harry won the task after having sat in the coop for nearly nine hours. As a reward, he was immune from the week's nominations and the public vote.; Day 10: Faye conducted an individual secret task called "Diss and Kiss" to find herself a date. She had to insult each male housemate and get them to give her a kiss. She chose Aaron with whom she shared a "hot" dinner date.; Days 12-13: housemates were given their next shopping task, which housemates were required to say "Yes" to everything Big Brother asked them to do, if they said "No", they failed automatically. Mark said "Yes" to wearing nothing but a tiny flesh-coloured pair of briefs for the day and he passed. Anton and Maisy accepted the task of Maisy wearing a lycra shock suit, and having Anton "electrocute" her; they then swapped roles and passed. Harry turned down a Gay Times photoshoot and failed. Rebeckah agreed to making Mark lose all his house possessions, leaving him with just his underpants. Aaron and Louise completed a "one-night stand" task involving them standing back-to-back in the garden at night until Big Brother said to stop.; Day 13: In Part 2 of the shopping task, Faye refused to have a tattoo saying "Yes" on her arm once she saw its size on a rubber stamp fake tattoo and failed. Tom said "Yes" to a haircut but declined a challenge to have a short back and sides and failed. Jay accepted the task of eating whole roast chickens, eating three in total. Aden said "Yes" to a task involving ignoring his girlfriend, Rebeckah. Heaven accepted the task of bungee jumping above the garden. Aaron and Louise said "Yes" to the offer of a "one-night stand" involving them standing back-to-back in the garden for a predetermined amount of time. At the end of the group task, they were given a code to the safe which revealed that the maximum number of fails allowed was five. They said "No" twice to an offer to watch the nominations but as the housemates said "Yes" to at least 8 of the 13 tasks, they received a luxury shopping budget as their reward.
Week 2	Punishments	On Day 9, as punishment for tampering with cameras and fixtures and for throwing Aaron's mattress into the pool, Big Brother punished the housemates by taking away the hot water, hair appliances and banning alcohol. They had to have cold showers during this period.; On Day 12, as punishment for Heaven, Harry and Anton discussing nominations, Big Brother extended the ban on hot water.
Week 2	Nominations	The housemates nominated for the second time. Heaven and Rebeckah received the most nominations and faced the public vote.
Week 2	Exits	On Day 15, Rebeckah was evicted from the house, receiving the fewest votes to save.
Week 3
Week 3	Tasks	Day 16: The housemates completed a 2 part group task called "Top Trumps". Part 1: Rating other housemates on categories by placing stickers in confidential survey sheet and rating qualities with percentage, writing 3 metres apart from each other. Part 2: Team captains: Aaron and Anton, revealing scores on personal qualities of housemates when velcro removed. Each team member had to spin a wheel with the housemates' photographs on it. When it stopped, they had to choose a quality of their own which they felt they would beat their opponent's scores. The winners were Aaron, Tom, Faye, Alex Harry and Mark; and their prize was a luxury party later that evening. The losers were Anton, Louise, Heaven, Aden, Maisy and Jay who were left out of the party.; On Day 17, the housemates were challenged to a task called "Meal shakes" in which they had to guess two classic meal combinations combined in milkshakes. The winners were Tom, Harry, Anton and Aden who won a luxury formal dinner with wine.; For this week's shopping task called "Man vs Beast" housemates were tested with their bravery as they went head to head with a supposedly real gorilla (the gorilla was actually impersonator Peter Elliott in the suit). The housemates were each given a toy gorilla to cuddle and give to the gorilla to transfer their scent to it. The gorilla then had to decide which housemate should take part in the first challenge, which involved passing a ball back and forth. The housemates then chose who would face the gorilla in the next two challenges, which involved taking a picture with the gorilla and dressing up as one and gaining the ape's trust. Each task passed would gain 30 seconds for the final task, which involved grabbing as many of the four hundred bananas that were scattered in the garden within the allotted time, while the gorilla "roamed free". Each banana grabbed would equal £1 towards the shopping list. In addition, two toy monkeys were also scattered in the garden; picking them up would add £50 to the shopping budget.; On Day 20, the housemates completed a group task challenging them to clean up the house dressed in white boiler suits while dancing to piped music.; On Day 21, Louise won her individual secret whoopee cushion task to "fart" 3 times in front of the housemates to earn a dinner date to eat chips and gravy with Jay.; On Day 22, the housemates were set a diary room betting task linked to a party poker game with the two surviving housemates after the Friday eviction. The same day, Alex won the group a barbecue after passing a task involving a quiz about her knowledge of the Barbie doll character.
Week 3	Punishments	As punishment for discussing nominations, Anton had to wear a sticker over his mouth and Maisy had to wear a hessian sack; each item had "I MUST NOT DISCUSS NOMINATIONS" written on it.
Week 3	Nominations	The housemates nominated for the third time. Aaron, Aden and Heaven received the most nominations and faced the public vote.
Week 3	Exits	On Day 22, Heaven was evicted from the house, receiving the fewest votes to save.
Week 4
Week 4	Tasks	On Day 23, Anton was appointed "King of the House" for his birthday. As part of this task, Big Brother fooled him into believing that his pop music single had topped the chart, backed up with fake interviews. The housemates had to keep up the deceit and obey all his demands of them as King, however humiliating. The housemates obeyed all the King's orders and won a luxury birthday party with champagne and chocolates with Anton performing his "winning" single in the garden. At the end of the task, Big Brother revealed to Anton that his track had not been released and he realised that he had been subjected to a practical joke. As a reward for completing the task, the housemates were given a party in the garden.; On Day 24, Big Brother set the eleven housemates a fast food based task called "Speed and stamina" involving them wearing fat suits, wigs and make-up to look like portly truck drivers. As there was an odd number of housemates, Aden did not compete and served the burgers from a fast food hut. They had to pair up and eat as many mini-burgers in three minutes as they could while racing round a track in the garden. The winners were Anton and Jay who ate 12 burgers. Anton dressed as a cheeseburger and Jay as a hotdog as winners of the task. They had to keep the outfits on in order to win some cans of beer as their reward.; On Day 26, the housemates faced the "Toy Factory" task in which they must assemble toys, teddy bears and assemble packs of playing cards in the correct order of the pack in order to win a shopping budget of £300. As "bossiest" housemate, Jay was appointed as factory manager charged with keeping the workers in order, with Anton and Aden appointed as his deputies. The factory workers' normal food was taken away and replaced with a factory canteen serving the workers meagre rations while the management sat in their office, eating luxury food and playing snooker. The workers had to produce a quota of each toy in order to win a full luxury shopping budget. Tom and Maisy were secretly tasked to produce individual targets in order to earn enhanced bonuses towards the shopping budget. The workers disrupted the task by throwing the toy components and cars around and having water fights in the factory. However, they passed their three toy-making quotas and passed. They won a total £500 luxury shopping budget thanks to Tom making the largest number of dolls during his secret mission.; On Day 27, Harry continued with the shopping task pranking by ordering 500 bananas, 1000 bottles of food colouring, 50 large chocolate bars, 50 litres of milk, 20 bottles of ketchup, 100 boxes of cereal and no alcohol which annoyed Jay.
Week 4	Punishments	On Day 24, Jay and Anton were punished by Big Brother by having to wear a hotdog and hamburger suit respectively as a twisted "reward" for winning the Fast Food Task in order to win drinks for the housemates. They were eventually allowed to remove the outfits and drink the beer, having endured the suits for several hours on an unusually hot autumn day.; On Day 26, as Boss of the factory, Jay "sacked" Aaron and Harry by making them "redundant" for misbehaving during the Toy Factory shopping task.
Week 4	Nominations	The housemates nominated for the fourth time. Faye and Maisy received the most nominations and faced the public vote.
Week 4	Exits	On Day 27, Mark walked from the house; On Day 29, Maisy was evicted from the house, receiving the fewest votes to save.
Week 5
Week 5	Entrances	On Day 29, Jem entered the house.; On Day 31, Rebeckah entered the house as a guest dinner date with Tom for a task prize.
Week 5	Tasks	Day 30: Faye and Jem were called to the diary room where they faced a secret task to build a "House of Cards". The other housemates danced to piped music and had to press a red button when, unbeknownst to them, a fan would blow on the house of cards sabotaging the sisters' task. However Faye and Jem completed the task and won the housemates a take-away meal after almost a week's diet of bananas and cereal.; On Day 31, the housemates faced a fairground style task called "Let's Get Smashed". They were called to the garden where there was a grid containing 25 prizes and punishments. Each Housemate took it in turns to throw a juggling ball at the square of their choice, winning a treat or a punishment. Jem won a gym session which she chose to share with Jay, Tom won a date with former housemate Rebeckah, Aaron won a cuddly toy, Harry won a phone call home, Jay won a bunch of bananas, and Aden won his bus fare home. Alex "won" a crockery and cutlery ban for the housemates - they had to hand all the plates, cups and cutlery in to Big Brother. Anton won a book token, Louise won a dinner for two. For Faye's "prize", Big Brother revealed all the housemates who had previously nominated her for eviction. The group sat and watched their nominations played out on the plasma and they also saw Faye's nominations for her fellow housemates to date.; Day 33: "Stranded World" snowbound shopping task to win a luxury food budget with housemates divided into rescuers and the stranded. Part 1 was a "rescue mission" led by Jay, Louise, Tom, Aden and Anton with the 6 other "stranded" in the large task room in a fake snowstorm. The taskroom and garden were decorated as an alpine scene. Jay had to do static "skiing" for 30 minutes on a skiing machine to rescue Alex, using only the sun to estimate the time taken for the task. He failed the task, stopping skiing 10 seconds short of the required time. Next, Louise had to eat five bowls of yellow snow in the diary room and guess the flavours. As she correctly guessed 3 out of 5 flavours, she passed, thus rescuing Alex. Next, Tom had to have a snowball fight with a Yeti (a man in a costume) to free Aden from the "Stranded World". He won, so rescuing Aden. Anton had to climb 1344 metres on a step machine disguised as "Mount BB". He completed task and Faye was free to leave the "Stranded World" room. A total of 3 housemates had to be rescued to pass the shopping task. The remaining three housemates were to have remained trapped in the large task room overnight and were given a survival kit of basic rations including sugar cubes, instant noodles and apples. In order to access these emergency supplies, Faye, Aaron, Jem and Harry had to work out the combination to a lock based on the clue given by Big Brother in a silver envelope found inside a hatch. Big Brother's clue to the correct combination was "Jem's age (28) / the number of people whom Aaron had snogged", viz. (Tom+Faye+Maisy = 3) giving the number 2803 which opened the lock and allowed them to get the rations. The remaining three "stranded" housemates walked from the task room, failing the task.; Day 34: Tom and Alex decided to organise their own task involving the other housemates hunting for balls made from coloured socks hidden around the house. Aden won the game collecting the most socks. As a reward, Big Brother invited the pair into the diary room where they were invited to dance to the Macarena song; they were left to dance to the same tune played continuously for 2 hours.; Day 35 Task: "Reveal the Meal" group task to win meals in TV gameshow format. In the garden, each housemate stood at a plinth on which a silver serving cloche rested containing a silver envelope which they had to open to reveal a meal. Each dish was displayed on a gameshow style board and every time they opened an envelope, they eliminated an option, e.g. fish and chips, beans on toast until only one option was left. Aden won, turning down Big Brother's offer to swap his winning dish for a luxury pasta dish and a phone call from Rebeckah instead of a meal for the housemates. He opted to keep the reward of pizza and beer for all the housemates to enjoy at dinner.; Day 36: Harry won a luxury food hamper for the house by passing a "Poshness" test, scoring 93 per cent after answering a variety of questions successfully including 'do you play polo?'. However, he failed to identify a port glass and also failed to tie a real bow tie correctly.
Week 5	Twists	On Day 32, Big Brother informed the housemates that they were allowed to discuss nominations this week.; On Day 33, during the shopping task, Big Brother outed Jem's actual age as 28, not 25 as she had previously stated.
Week 5	Punishments	On Day 34, Big Brother told the housemates that they had failed the "Stranded" task due to the stranded housemates leaving the large task room prematurely against the task rules. The rescuers had successfully passed their mission and won a luxury shopping budget. However, due to the escape, the house lost the luxury shopping budget and instead had an economy budget of £100 for the following week.
Week 5	Nominations	The housemates nominated for the fifth time. Aaron, Aden, Anton, Faye and Jay received the most nominations and faced the public vote. Due to being a new housemate, Jem was exempt from the nomination process.
Week 5	Exits	On Day 36, Aden was evicted from the house, receiving the fewest votes to save.
Week 6	Tasks	Day 37: Task: "Love Letter Bombs". Each housemate received a "love letter bomb" from their loved ones at home. Each letter was contained in a booby-trapped mail box with sticks of "dynamite" on top. In order to reach the letter, they had to cut the correct coloured wire on the "letter bomb" with the supplied wire-cutters. The correct wire, A, B or C was identified by answering a multiple choice question on the plasma based on what other housemates had said about each other. If they cut the correct wire, the mailbox opened, releasing their letter. If they cut the wrong wire the "dynamite" exploded and the letter was destroyed. They were called randomly to be told that their letter had been activated by Marcus Bentley who gave them a countdown to detonation. To prevent this, they needed to cut the correct wire. Winners: Alex, Jay, Louise, Faye, Aaron, Tom, Jem, Anton. Loser: Harry.; Day 38: Diary room "Peg on your Face" task. Winner: Aaron pegged 47 pegs on his ears and face, rewards: trophy and champagne. Rest of prize reveal on Day 39.; Day 39: Anton and Jay entered the Crypt to participate in the week's coming series of twists and horror-themed tasks.; Day 40: "Don't Scream" task. The "living" housemates were awoken and told they must not scream more than 3 times to avoid losing a luxury food budget. However, unknown to them, the task rule was that they must scream more than 3 times to pass. From their tomb in the crypt, "dead" housemates Jay and Anton were tasked to choose from a selection of pranks including: a monster's hand coming out of a hatch, a demon in the diary room, spider webs in the halls, dead bodies in the hallway, one of which grabbed a housemate's leg, a haunting in the storeroom, a ghost of a little girl. Louise was subjected to a shower of blood and greeted by a demon in the diary room and let out a scream. Harry was confronted by one of his fears, spiders and grabbed by a werewolf's hand but he did not scream. Faye was not fazed by the ghost of a little girl in the diary room passage and she did not scream. Aaron screamed at the sight of a zombie springing to life as he left the diary room. Alex entered the diary room after an attack on nerves and screamed at the sight of ex-housemate Tashie's head on a caged dog. Therefore, Louise, Alex, Tom and Aaron all screamed, exceeding three screams. They therefore passed the "Don't Scream" task and won a luxury food budget for the week.; Day 41: Task: the housemates were told they must prove themselves most entertaining to Big Brother to win a place at the film premiere of Paranormal Activity 3 taking place in the Big Brother house on the night of Day 41. In fact, Jay and Anton had to judge the four lucky housemates to win seats at the movie preview, viewing them from their crypt. Housemates failing to entertain Jay and Anton were Alex, Harry and Faye. The winners of the seats were Aaron, Louise, Jem and Tom. They joined a number of ex-Big Brother housemates and stars at the red carpet preview night.; Also on Day 41, it was revealed that Jay and Anton passed their side of the Scream task, having managed to get more than three housemates to scream during their time as emtombed ghouls.; Day 42 Faye and Jem did a burp task to win alcohol. They were given fizzy drinks and had to burp in Aaron's face, winning drinks for each burp, up to 15 times.; Day 43: Tom was called to the diary room by Big Brother and set an individual task. His challenge was to wind up Harry to the point of explosion with a series of pranks of his own choice in order for Harry to win back his letter from home. (Harry lost this in the "Letter Bombs" task.) Tom successfully passed but as he did not receive the explosive reaction needed from Harry, 48 per cent of letter was concealed.
Week 6	Twists	Day 39: As a result of receiving the most nominations, Anton and Jay were told they were up for an instant exit and told to pack their suitcases. However, they were in fact relocated in a secret room in the house campus dubbed "The Crypt". From there, they were able watch the rest of the housemates on a plasma (similar to the "Bedsit" in Big Brother 2004). Big Brother told them that they must remain hidden from the other housemates and be "dead" to them until their return to the main house on Day 41. They returned to the house on Day 41 when they had one minute each to nominate two other housemates for eviction in a further paranormal twist, choosing Jem and Harry.
Week 6	Punishments	On Day 41, as a forfeit for failing to entertain hidden housemates Anton and Jay, living housemates Alex, Hary and Faye were obliged to dress as zombies and could not attend the film premiere, having to look on from behind the bathroom window. Each task loser had to lie in a grave in the garden with a tombstone marked "RIP" and rise from the grave to become the "living dead" for the duration of the VIP evening. To add to their humiliation, during the winners' visit to the film premiere, Jay and Anton wrecked the house while Alex, Faye and Harry listened to a ghost story in the task room.
Week 6	Nominations	The housemates nominated for the sixth time. Anton and Jay received the most nominations, but in a twist, they exited the main house and entered "The Crypt" as ghosts, lying low in a secret hidden room adjacent to the garden. Their "exit" was indicated when their faces changed to red on the lightbox. They returned to the main house on Day 41 during a fake "seance" in the Crypt. Anton and Jay rose from their tombs and had one minute to nominate two other housemates for eviction as part of the week's twist. Anton nominated Jem to face the public vote while Jay nominated Harry.
Week 6	Exits	On Day 43, Anton was evicted from the house, receiving the fewest votes to save.
Week 7	Tasks	Day 44: "Let it row" endurance challenge task in garden on rowing machines. They dressed as old-style Varsity rowers in blazers, white shorts and moustaches with coloured neck ribbons to indicate their teams. Team Steel: Harry, Faye, Jem (blue ribbon) and Tom v. Team Butch: Louise, Alex, Jay and Aaron (red ribbon). They competed to view four housemates' audition tapes. Finalists: Jem and Alex. Winner: Alex after 8 hours 3 minutes, after Jem quit. Alex chose Harry, Tom, Faye and Aaron's audition VTs for the others to view on the plasma screen.; Day 45: Task: "Distraction". The task was to solve a drawing puzzle by drawing a continuous line on a clear screen, keeping it in between the two squiggly lines resembling a maze with dots marking the start and finish. If a Housemate went outside the lines or lifted the pen off the sheet, they incurred a 10-second penalty. An actor stepped into the diary room to cause a "distraction", according to the likes or sensitivities of the participant. Jem won the task with the time of 30 seconds. This included a 10-second time penalty for drawing outside the line. She was rewarded with a session with a beautician for her and another housemate of her choice; she chose her sister Faye to join her.; The housemates were also set a silent dancing challenge for which they were rewarded with some piped music played into the house.; Day 47: Shopping task: "Place your bets". Louise, Jay and Jem were chosen as the group's most observant housemates to place bets in the task room converted to a betting shop. They bet on the outcomes of five individual housemates' tasks which were set throughout the day. This gave them a chance to swell the shopping budget. Tasks included a successful wager on how many chocolate balls Alex could eat (she managed 21). They passed the task and gained a shopping budget of £300.; Day 48: Task: Cinnamon shots: Big Brother gave each of the housemates a teaspoonful of cinnamon powder in a shot glass which they had to down in one go without spilling it or spitting it out. Three out of seven housemates managed this, passing the task. As a reward, they gained a 90s-themed rave party with party wigs and glowsticks.; Day 49: Task: "Get in the Ring" wrestling' wrestling contest. Big Brother set up a wrestling ring in the garden with Aaron acting as referee. The housemates were given accessories to create silly costumes and wore coloured socks. Each pair pitched a male v. a female housemate; the object was to grapple the opponent and remove their socks. Overall winner Tom, winners of the rounds were given a prize of an Indian takeaway and a luxury food hamper. As a bonus, Tom won a cucumber.; Day 50: Big Brother called Louise to the Diary Room and asked her 7 questions about the housemates' attitudes to money, following the display of the £100,000 prize fund in the living room. Louise answered four out of seven questions correctly, winning the housemates drinks.
Week 7	Twists	On Day 46, in a major twist, nominations were given by the housemates' family members and partners.
Week 7	Punishments	On Day 45, for coming last in the "Distraction" task, Alex faced a sanction to make all the unmade beds in the house.
Week 7	Nominations	This week, the housemates' relatives nominated, instead of the housemates themselves. Aaron and Jem received the most nominations and faced the public vote.
Week 7	Exits	On Day 48, Jem walked from the house.; On Day 50, Harry was evicted from the house, receiving the fewest votes to save.
Week 8	Tasks	Day 51: Cleaning task, Tom was given an individual task to tell the housemates to clean up the house. In order to pass the task he had to avoid helping with the cleaning duties without being found out. Aaron guessed that he was on a task, resulting in a fail.; Chipmunks task: the housemates dressed in oversize chipmunk costumes. Each took turns to go into the small task room and choose one of six pop songs distorted to sound like a chipmunk. The other housemates had to guess the songs and the more songs they guessed, the better the party would gain as a prize, the worst being a peanut party. They guessed all six songs and won a "Giant Brazil nut" quality party, the best grade on offer.; Day 53: "Egg roulette" task. Winners: Alex and Louise who won a roast chicken dinner for two.; Day 54: Acting task "Love Story". The six remaining housemates paired up as "couples" to imimitate the pairings that have formed in the house.; Day 55: Shopping budget task: 'It'll be all white' set and supervised in person by celebrity cleaning expert Kim Woodburn who visited them as a houseguest. The housemates were award a luxury shopping budget of £300 and given pristine white outfits for the day to celebrate. However, they were instructed to keep the outfits as clean as possible and faced a reduced shopping budget as a forfeit to staining the outfits. During the day, they faced a series of booby-trapped challenges designed to deliberately stain their white outfits. E.g. Alex had to carry a tray of alcohol-free "Virgin Mary" cocktails in tall glasses while negotiating a series of hurdles covered in wet paint. Kim also inspected the house and demanded the housemates clean up the house thoroughly before her return. At the conclusion of the task, Woodburn returned to the house and inspected the housemates' efforts and scrutinised their clothing for stains. Tom, Jay and Aaron passed; Alex, Louise and Faye failed. Big Brother deducted £50 per fail, reducing the shopping budget to £150. Kim used her discretion to award them a bonus of £50 for their cleaning efforts around the house, leaving the housemates with a total of £200 for the week's shopping budget.; Day 55: Big Brother set notorious swearers Jay and Tom a task called "Soap Mouths". They were told they must not swear more than five times in order to win some drinks. Aaron was set a counter-task to make them swear more than five times by winding them up with insults, a task which he accomplished as they swore 7 times, winning the house some drinks.
Week 8	Twists	On Day 52, nominations took place on a Sunday dressed up in Halloween outfits and the housemates sat in electric chairs in the garden. They had to nominate face-to-face and the nominees received an electric shock.; On Day 57, a twist to the prize fund was announced after the money that had been displayed in the house for several days was removed. The prize fund of £100,000 was split into two, with the winner promised £50,000. The remaining £50,000 will be split between the five finalists as revealed to them on Day 58.
Week 8	Punishments	On Day 52, during the Halloween nominations task, housemates who spoke out of turn were given an extra electric shock.
Week 8	Nominations	The housemates nominated for the seventh time. Faye and Louise received the most nominations and faced the public vote.
Week 8	Exits	On Day 57, Faye was evicted from the house, receiving the fewest votes to save.
Week 9	Tasks	Day 58: Big Brother told housemates they had 5 hours to assign the divided fund of £50,000 between each other as follows: £30,000, £15,000, £4,000, £990 and £10. The wrote the amounts on pieces of paper and drew lots from a hat to assign the money as follows: Alex £30,000, Jay £15,000, Louise £4,000, Aaron £990, Tom £10. The housemates agreed to split the money equally after the show.; Day 58 also saw Big Brother set task called "Pass the Dare". In this, the housemates were given a parcel which they had to unwrap one layer at a time in the style of the party game, "Pass the Parcel", revealing a dare. The five housemates had to do a series of individual dares and challenges on each other. They passed the game, winning some alcohol.; Day 59 saw a task designed to win Alex and Tom a birthday party (Alex's birthday fell on 6 November and Tom's was the next day). Aaron was called to the diary room and charged with ensuring that the birthday party Big Brother had planned for them was a surprise. Alex and Tom were first challenged to a Macarena marathon on a small stage in the garden. They had to get on stage and dance within 30 seconds of being called by Big Brother. They next had to eat all the ingredients involved in making a birthday cake including flour, eggs and candles. Finally, they had to be wrapped in gift wrapping paper as a parcel while the housemates prepared for their surprise party. This was revealed to Alex and Tom once they were unwrapped.; Day 60 was Tom's birthday. The day included a task involving the housemates dressed in bodysuits covered in balloons and negotiating a hazardous assault course in the garden. This included being assailed by clowns wielding pins to pop the balloons and a net barbed with rose thorns and holly. They won individual rewards including presents, music and gifts.; Day 61 saw the housemates get head-to-toe makeovers with the professional hair and beauty treatments of their choice. Aaron opted for a full body waxing the women had facials and new hairdos. This was in preparation for an OK! Magazine photoshoot later in the day.; Day 62's task was "The Housemates" Housemate', won by Alex.
Week 9	Punishments	Louise was given a warning by Big Brother for the housemates having slept in the bedroom out of the designated rest times. As a reprimand, the bedroom was locked until the housemates went to bed.; Jay received a formal warning from the producers after making comments about Aaron against house rules following a row over Alex and Tom's birthday presents.
Week 9	Exits	On Day 63, Tom was evicted from the house, having received the fewest votes to win thus far.; On Day 64, Louise left the house in fourth place and Alex left the house in third place. It was then revealed that Aaron was the winner, leaving Jay as the runner-up.

== Production ==
=== History and build-up ===
After Richard Desmond bought Channel 5, he said he was keen to acquire Big Brother. Meanwhile, Endemol UK had been granted permission to keep the Big Brother House at the Elstree Studios, Hertfordshire, until 30 September 2013. On 6 April 2011, Channel 5 formally confirmed that they had signed a £200 million two-year contract with Endemol to screen Big Brother from 18 August 2011.

=== Auditions ===
On 3 May 2011, Endemol and Channel 5 officially opened the process for people to apply to be on the show. Open auditions for the Channel 5 series were held at Old Trafford in Greater Manchester on 10 and 11 June 2011. Auditions were also held in London on 18 and 19 June 2011 at the Emirates Stadium. All applicants had to attend the open auditions with identification to be considered for the series and had to be a legal resident of the UK or Ireland aged 18 or over by 31 July 2011 to audition for the show. Big Brother 2010 winner Josie Gibson took part in filming at the London auditions meeting potential housemates.

=== Trailers ===
From 23 July 2011, trailers announcing the imminent return of the celebrity version of the series were aired using Marcus Bentley's voice. Former housemates that featured in one of the trailers included Josie Gibson, Brian Dowling and Alex Reid. This coincided with the launch of the new eye logo for 2011. In the run-up to Celebrity Big Brother, the channel featured a promotional campaign under the slogan "When Bruv takes over" based on the David Guetta and Kelly Rowland song "When Love Takes Over". It featured a large cast of past housemates dancing and miming in the streets, finally meeting up in a park with CGI effects adding a fly-past with coloured smoke overhead. Break bumpers announcing the series were broadcast in the week running up to the launch along with a countdown to the launch day voiced by Bentley. Channel 5 took out commercials on other channels, including ITV1 promoting the launch of the new series. The launch was also trailed heavily in the printed media, including an advertising blitz in the Desmond-owned newspapers and magazines and posters in town centres. In the second week of the celebrity version, trailers heralded the return of the main series on 9 September 2011.

=== Format ===
The format remained largely unchanged from previous seasons. The housemates are incarcerated in the Big Brother House with a strict rule of no contact with the outside world. Each week, the housemates take part in a major task that determines the size of the shopping budget, enables them to win luxuries and in some tasks, immunity from that week's eviction or power in the House. Nominations are normally carried out in the privacy of the diary room and are compulsory. Each housemate must nominate two of their fellow housemates to face the public vote and provide Big Brother with a justifiable reason for the nomination. "Voting to save" has been used for the public vote as opposed to the "vote to evict" method generally used in previous series. On eviction night, the housemate with the fewest votes to save will be evicted. The last housemate remaining in the house will be the winner of the series.

=== The House ===
This series still used the revamped variation of the house in Elstree Studios, Borehamwood. The main elements of the house design were inherited from those used for the previous celebrity series. Viewers first previewed the new Big Brother house during Celebrity Big Brother 2011 in preparation for the intake of regular housemates on the night of 9 September 2011. Differences included the walls being changed from a fish theme to a forest theme, and the bedroom being made over with fresh textiles and gold mirrored furniture for the regular housemates. In the bathroom, the installation of a transparent double shower cabinet with a frosted central band offered minimal privacy. There was a clear view of the shower's unclothed occupant from the house and garden but the frosting obscured the user's private parts from a clear view. There was a large central free-standing oval bath, with small pink and blue hand towels provided. The bathroom was mainly blue and pink with a sofa and a clear view of the goings on from the living room and garden. Some of the house space was converted to create a luxury apartment for houseguest Pamela Anderson during her stay in the house earlier in the series. Following Anderson's departure, the luxury bedroom was used for a variety of tasks. The wall of faces in the living room was also changed on Day 3 with the new housemates' faces added. These turn blue to indicate the nominated housemates and red to indicate an evicted housemate or to mark that a housemate has walked.

The Diary Room chair for this series was in the style of a luxury club chair in deep red with gold trim. The new Diary room had already been featured in Celebrity Big Brother 2011 along with a small task room adjacent.

The garden retained the oblong pool used in the previous Celebrity Big Brother series. In Week 1, an artificial beach area was installed ready for the arrival of Pamela Anderson. Later, this area featured in several outdoor tasks. There are areas of astroturf and decking, palm trees and an outdoor shower. Three leather sofas stood in an outdoor lounge area next to the "beach". There were doors leading to the sauna cabin, toilet and the main house. There was also an area of rattan seating with a selection of cushions, throws and garden lanterns. This area had an artificial fire hearth which lit up at night, with a decoration of logs and flames.

=== Eye logo ===
For the renewal of the show Channel 5 created a logo which was different from all of the previous Channel 4 logos. It was instead the Channel 4 eye inverted and mirrored to make it look more clean and simplistic. For series twelve the logo was as basic as ever. It had a grey shape surrounding the outside and had a pink inner circle further into the eye. This was followed by a grey/blue circle in the middle representing the pupil.

=== Title sequence ===
The main motif for the show's titles was a space-age-style, revolving 3D glowing eye. The titles were almost identical to that of Celebrity Big Brother and the housemates were included in the title sequences, showing various parts of their face/top part of body.

=== The Crypt ===
On Day 39, Big Brother revealed the presence of the Crypt, a secret burial place for nominated housemates Jay and Anton who became "ghosts" dead to the other housemates as part of the Week 6 shopping budget task. It was located near the main house, adjacent to the garden, and was decorated with Gothic-effect mouldings, gravestones, cobwebs, church candles and skeletons. The room contained two tomb-styled beds. From there, Jay and Anton could view and listen to their former housemates, eavesdropping on their conversations. However, they had to remain silent during their stay to avoid detection by their fellow housemates.

=== Web presence and social media ===
Unlike most previous Channel 4 series, there was no 24-hour, free-to-air live feed from the house. The producers instead concentrated on the daily highlights shows, the spin-off and weekly eviction shows. They also placed daily preview clips from the action in the house on the dedicated website and YouTube page, with frequent updates on social media sites Twitter and Facebook.

=== Twists ===
During Week 6, on Day 39, a major nominations twist was introduced in the run-up to the film premiere of Paranormal Activity 3 which was to take place in the house later that week. Jay and Anton were nominated in the normal way but when the result of nominations was announced to the housemates they were told that they would be leaving the house immediately. However, they entered a secret area called the Crypt where they were told they were to be "dead" to the other housemates. On the lightbox, their faces changed to red to indicate their "exit". From the Crypt, Jay and Anton, dressed a ghouls, were able to watch the remaining housemates and performed a series of pranks on them. They returned to the main house three days later following a seance in the crypt involving the other housemates. After revealing themselves in scary fashion, Anton and Jay had to nominate two other housemates for eviction, choosing Jem and Harry respectively to face the public vote. On Day 46, in a further nominations twist, the housemates' friends and family openly made the weekly eviction nominations. On Day 52, nominations took place on a Sunday, with housemates dressed up in Halloween costumes and sat in electric chairs in the garden. The housemates had to nominate face-to-face. Each nominated housemate received an electric shock delivered by Big Brother's assistant Igor. On Day 57, it was revealed that one housemate (later revealed as Tom) would be evicted on the Thursday night prior to the Final.

On the eviction night of Day 57, Big Brother announced that the prize fund of £100,000 would be split as follows. The money was divided into two halves, with the overall winner receiving £50,000. The other £50,000 was to be split unevenly between the five finalists at the end of the series in the following amounts: £30,000, £15,000, £4,000, £990 and £10 with the winner receiving £50,000 plus the bonus. However, Big Brother told the housemates they must decide how to divide up the £50,000 themselves or lose it; however, viewers were told that this will not actually be the case. On Day 58, the housemates drew lots to divide the money as follows: Alex, £30,000, Jay, £15,000, Louise, £4,000, Aaron, £990 and Tom, £10. As series winner, Aaron won a total prize of £50,990. The five recipients agreed to split the prize fund between each other equally once they leave the house.

== Ratings ==
Weekly ratings for each show on Channel 5. Figures exclude Channel 5 +1. All numbers are in millions and provided by BARB.

	Viewers (in millions)									
	Week 1		Week 2	Week 3	Week 4	Week 5	Week 6	Week 7	Week 8	Week 9
Saturday		1.67	1.14	1.34	1.31	1.24	1.14	1.1	1.04	1.2
Sunday		1.72	1.44	1.55	1.5	1.44	1.36	1.43	1.44	1.43
Monday		1.69	1.64	1.73	1.63	1.59	1.5	1.6	1.46	1.64
Tuesday		1.61	1.67	1.62	1.61	1.45	1.51	1.8	1.47	1.71
Wednesday		1.65	1.58	1.6	1.57	1.61	1.58	1.65	1.43	1.45
Thursday		1.37	1.55	1.61	1.73	1.63	1.59	1.67	1.51	1.89
Friday	2.77	1.93	1.63	1.41	1.72	1.72	1.72	1.65	1.72	2.2
Friday	2.77	1.41	1.31	1.23	1.5	1.47	1.41	1.57	1.72	2.2
Weekly average	1.76		1.5	1.51	1.57	1.52	1.48	1.56	1.43	1.65
Running average	1.76		1.63	1.59	1.55	1.52	1.52	1.53	1.5	1.53
Series average	1.53									

After the relative success of Celebrity Big Brother 8, the main show struggled in the ratings for the majority of its run. The live final on 11 November closed the series with an all-time low of 2.2 million, around half the final viewing figures of Big Brother 11.
