= I'm a Celebrity...Get Me Out of Here! (British TV series) series 3 =

I'm a Celebrity...Get Me Out of Here!
- Series 3
- Presented by: Anthony McPartlin; Declan Donnelly
- No. of days: 16
- No. of castaways: 10
- Winner: Kerry Katona
- Runner-up: Jennie Bond
- Location: New South Wales, Australia
- Companion show: I'm a Celebrity...Get Me Out of Here! NOW!
- No. of episodes: 17

Release
- Original network: ITV
- Original release: 26 January – 9 February 2004

Series chronology
- ← Previous; Series 2 Next → Series 4

The third series of I'm a Celebrity...Get Me Out of Here! began on 26 January 2004 and ended on 9 February 2004. The programme ran for 15 days (16 days if counting the morning the finalists exited) and was sponsored by First Choice Holidays. The series was won by Kerry Katona (McFadden at the time) who donated her winnings to Temple Street Children's Hospital and Variety - the Children's Charity of Ireland.

Ant & Dec presented the main show on ITV, whilst Mark Durden-Smith and former contestant Tara Palmer-Tomkinson hosted the spin-off show I'm A Celebrity... Get Me Out of Here... Now! on ITV2. Live streaming continued this series and was broadcast after midnight on ITV1, and from 2am on ITV2.

This series saw contestants Peter Andre and Katie Price (named Jordan) start a high-profile relationship which would feature in tabloids and magazines for the five years they were together. Price returned to the jungle for a second time in 2009, while Andre made a guest appearance in the 2011 series.

== Celebrities ==
10 celebrities participated in the series:

Celebrity	Famous for	Status
Kerry Katona	Former Atomic Kitten singer	Winner on 9 February 2004
Jennie Bond	Journalist	Runner-up on 9 February 2004
Peter Andre	Singer	Third place on 9 February 2004
Lord Brocket	Aristocrat	Eliminated 6th on 8 February 2004
Katie "Jordan" Price	Page 3 model	Eliminated 5th on 7 February 2004
Alex Best	Ex-wife of George Best	Eliminated 4th on 6 February 2004
John Lydon	Sex Pistols singer	Withdrew on 5 February 2004
Neil "Razor" Ruddock	Former England footballer	Eliminated 3rd on 4 February 2004
Diane Modahl	Olympic athlete	Eliminated 2nd on 3 February 2004
Mike Read	Radio DJ	Eliminated 1st on 2 February 2004

== Results and elimination ==
Indicates that the celebrity received the fewest votes and was immediately eliminated (no bottom two)
Indicates that the celebrity was in the bottom two in the public vote

	Day 9	Day 10	Day 11	Day 12	Day 13	Day 14	Day 15	Day 16		Number of trials
	Day 9	Day 10	Day 11	Day 12	Day 13	Day 14	Day 15	Round 1	Round 2	Number of trials
Kerry	Safe	Safe	Safe	Safe	Safe	Safe	Safe	Safe	Winner (Day 16)	4
Jennie	Bottom two	Safe	Bottom two	Safe	Safe	Safe	Safe	Safe	Runner-up (Day 16)	4
Peter	Safe	Bottom two	Safe	Safe	Bottom two	Bottom two	Bottom two	3rd	Eliminated (Day 16)	4
Lord Brocket	Safe	Safe	Safe	Safe	Safe	Safe	4th	Eliminated (Day 15)		4
Jordan	Safe	Safe	Safe	Safe	Safe	5th	Eliminated (Day 14)			3
Alex	Safe	Safe	Safe	Safe	6th	Eliminated (Day 13)				1
John	Safe	Safe	Safe	Withdrew (Day 11)						1
Razor	Safe	Safe	8th	Eliminated (Day 11)						1
Diane	Safe	9th	Eliminated (Day 10)							1
Mike	10th	Eliminated (Day 9)								0
Bottom two (named in)	Jennie, Mike	Diane, Peter	Jennie, Razor	None	Alex, Peter	Jordan, Peter	Lord Brocket, Peter	None		
Eliminated	Mike Fewest votes to save	Diane Fewest votes to save	Razor Fewest votes to save	None	Alex Fewest votes to save	Jordan Fewest votes to save	Lord Brocket Fewest votes to save	Peter Fewest votes to win	Jennie Fewest votes to win	
Eliminated	Mike Fewest votes to save	Diane Fewest votes to save	Razor Fewest votes to save	None	Alex Fewest votes to save	Jordan Fewest votes to save	Lord Brocket Fewest votes to save	Peter Fewest votes to win	Kerry Most votes to win	

== Bushtucker Trials ==
The contestants take part in daily trials to earn food

The public vote for who they want to face the trial
The contestants decide who does which trial
The trial is compulsory and neither the public nor celebrities decide who take part

Trial Number	Airdate	Name of Trial	Celebrity Participation	Winner/Number of Stars	Notes
1	26 January	Fill Your Face	Jordan; Razor	10/10 stars	None
2	27 January	Beat the Birds	John	6/10 stars	None
3	28 January	Jungle Houdini	Kerry	2/10 stars	None
4 (Live)	29 January	Use Your Head	Peter	10/10 stars	^{1}
5	30 January	Danger Down Under	Jennie	10/10 stars	None
6	31 January	Ladder Lottery	Lord Brocket	9/10 stars	None
7	1 February	Bite to Bite	Jordan; Kerry	7/10 stars	None
8	2 February	Tunnel of Terror	Alex	7/10 stars	None
9	3 February	Row for Your Life	Diane; Peter	0/9 stars	None
10	4 February	Splash and Grab	Jordan	4/8 stars	None
11	5 February	Torture Tank	Lord Brocket	7/7 stars	None
12	6 February	Celebrity Seesaw	Jennie; Peter	6/6 stars	None
13	7 February	Snake Lake	Jordan	3/5 stars	None
14	8 February	Hell Hill	Jennie; Kerry; Lord Brocket; Peter	2/4 stars	None
15	9 February	Cockroach Attack	Kerry	0/5 stars	^{2}
16	9 February	Spider Man	Peter	5/5 stars	^{3}
17	9 February	Bushtucker Bonanza	Jennie	5/5 stars	None

=== Notes ===
^1 This was the first bushtucker trial ever to be screened live on television.
^2 Kerry refused to participate.
^3 This was a reworking of Kerry's refused trial.

== Star count ==
Celebrity	Number of Stars Earned	Percentage
Alex Best	7/10 stars	70%
Diane Modahl	0/9 stars	0%
Jennie Bond	23/25 stars	92%
John Lydon	6/10 stars	60%
Katie "Jordan" Price	24/33 stars	73%
Kerry Katona	11/29 stars	38%
Lord Brocket	18/21 stars	86%
Mike Read	—N/a	—N/a
Neil "Razor" Ruddock	10/10 stars	100%
Peter Andre	23/34 stars	68%

== Ratings ==
Ratings from BARB.

Episode	Air date	Official rating (millions)	Weekly rank for all UK TV channels	Share
1	26 January	10.54	19	41.1%
2	27 January	9.63	22	—N/a
3	28 January	11.19	13	42.0%
4	28 January	10.67	17	44.0%
5	29 January	10.45	20	—N/a
6	30 January	10.96	14	43.5%
7	31 January	8.96	25	35.0%
8	1 February	10.65	18	39.8%
9	2 February	11.66	12	44.4%
10	3 February	10.85	16	42.2%
11	4 February	10.87	15	42.8%
12	4 February	10.78	17	44.1%
13	5 February	11.88	11	46.2%
14	6 February	11.26	13	43.2%
15	7 February	10.10	22	39.5%
16	8 February	11.96	10	43.8%
17	9 February	14.99	1	54.5%
Series average	2004	11.02	—N/a	43.1%
