= Fame in the Family =

English reality television game show

- Genre: Game show
- Narrated by: Pippa Haywood
- Country of origin: United Kingdom
- Original language: English
- No. of series: 1
- No. of episodes: 15

Production
- Executive producers: Sally Evans, Amanda De Freitas
- Running time: 23 minutes
- Production company: Salamanda Media

Original release
- Network: Channel 4
- Release: 14 March – 1 April 2022

Fame in the Family is a British reality series that aired on Channel 4 over three weeks beginning 14 March 2022. It is narrated by Pippa Haywood. All episodes are currently available to stream on-demand on All 4.

== Format ==
Four strangers meet up in Manchester Hall for dinner with a surprise celebrity host. At least one of the guests will be related to the host.

Over dinner they talk about their families and play fact-finding games to help them decide whether they could be related to one another.

At the end of the dinner party, the diners hold up a card on which they have written the name or names of who they think is a cousin of the celebrity. The host opens an envelope to reveal the DNA results. If anyone guesses correctly they win a share of a £1,000 cash prize.

The relevant parts of the family tree are then shown on-screen as the narrator explains how the guest or guests share a DNA match.

The show has been both praised and panned by the press. There has been no announcement yet as to whether it will return for a second series.

== Episodes ==
No.	Guest(s)	Original release date
1	Craig Revel Horwood	14 March 2022
2	Shaun Ryder	15 March 2022
3	Neil Ruddock	16 March 2022
4	Rustie Lee	17 March 2022
5	Kerry Katona	18 March 2022
6	AJ and Curtis Pritchard	21 March 2022
7	Joe Pasquale	22 March 2022
8	Toyah Willcox	23 March 2022
9	James Argent	24 March 2022
10	Ann Widdecombe	25 March 2022
11	Hayley Tamaddon	28 March 2022
12	Will Bayley	29 March 2022
13	Christopher Biggins	30 March 2022
14	Martin Offiah	31 March 2022
15	Carl Fogarty	1 April 2022

== Similar programmes ==
The show borrows heavily from another Channel 4 daytime show Come Dine with Me mixed in with the long-running BBC series Who Do You Think You Are? and a touch of the ITV1 series Long Lost Family. According to the end credits, and in line with most genealogy programmes, the DNA results are provided by Ancestry with assistance from family history expert Brad Argent.
