= Paddy Doherty (TV personality) =

Irish former bare-knuckle boxer from an Irish Traveller background and reality TV star

- Born: Patrick Ward; 6 February 1959 (age 67); Manchester, England
- Occupation: TV personality
- Years active: 2009–present
- Television: Danny Dyer's Deadliest Men; Big Fat Gypsy Weddings (2010–2015); Celebrity Big Brother; When Paddy Met Sally; Celebrity Bainisteoir
- Spouse: Roseanne
- Children: 10

Patrick Doherty (born 6 February 1959) is an Irish Traveller who is a former bare-knuckle boxer. He is best known as one of the stars of My Big Fat Gypsy Wedding and Danny Dyer's Deadliest Men. He won Celebrity Big Brother 8. He appeared in When Paddy Met Sally in January 2012 and on Celebrity Bainisteoir later that year.

== Early life ==
Doherty was born to Irish Traveller parents and moved around Manchester as a child and also to various sites in and around Birmingham. He did not attend school. His grandparents posed as his parents in his younger years but when he became a teenager he was sent to live with someone he was told was his "sister" and her family; but his "sister" was actually his mother. She had been unmarried when she delivered him, so it was kept quiet to avoid shame on the family.

== Career ==
=== My Big Fat Gypsy Wedding ===
Doherty was one of the Irish Travellers interviewed for the documentary My Big Fat Gypsy Wedding.

=== Celebrity Big Brother ===
On 18 August 2011, Doherty was the third person to enter the Celebrity Big Brother 8 house. He won the series, beating Kerry Katona at the final stage.

Doherty made an appearance on The Late Late Show in September 2011. He spoke about his experience on Big Brother, and his unexpected victory. He also spoke about his personal life and the loss of his son, Patrick. Before that, Doherty appeared on ITV's This Morning.

=== When Paddy Met Sally ===
Doherty appeared in a two-part Channel 5 documentary with his former Big Brother housemate Sally Bercow, wife of the Speaker of the House of Commons. Bercow moved into Doherty's chalet on his Queensferry travellers' site, living by his rules in episode one and hers in episode two. When Paddy Met Sally aired in January 2012.

=== Celebrity Bainisteoir ===
In 2012, Doherty appeared on Celebrity Bainisteoir.

=== Gypsy Kids: Our Secret World ===
In 2016 Doherty appeared in this Channel 5 series about Traveller life from the children's perspective. He talked about the importance of staying on in education for his community. He appeared on This Morning alongside his granddaughter, 8-year-old Margaret, to debate this issue.

=== Dan and Paddy’s Bucket list-Kyushu Japan ===
Doherty explored Kyushu and partook in challenges along the way with his co-host, Daniel Coll.

=== The Truth About Traveller Crime ===
In 2020, Doherty took part in the controversial Channel 4 programme The Truth About Traveller Crime. The programme received complaints which led to an Ofcom investigation. On 1 September 2021, Ofcom found The Truth About Traveller Crime was not in breach of broadcast standards, ruling the programme did not misrepresent facts when discussing the issue of crime and the Gypsy and Traveller community, and whilst it contained potentially harmful and offensive material, this was appropriately justified by context, and that the broadcaster provided sufficient warning to viewers that program contents may be harmful or offensive.

== Personal life ==
Doherty encourages his grandchildren to remain in education.

Doherty was hospitalised after becoming infected with COVID-19 in January 2021.

Preceded by Alex Reid	Celebrity Big Brother UK Winner; Series 8 (2011)	Succeeded by Denise Welch
