= Celebrity Big Brother (British TV series) series 8 =

Coordinates: 51°39′23″N 0°16′02″W

Celebrity Big Brother
- Series 8
- Series eight logo
- Presented by: Brian Dowling
- No. of days: 22
- No. of housemates: 10
- Winner: Paddy Doherty
- Runner-up: Kerry Katona
- Companion shows: Big Brother's Bit on the Side
- No. of episodes: 23

Release
- Original network: Channel 5
- Original release: 18 August – 8 September 2011

Series chronology
- ← Previous; Series 7 Next → Series 9

Celebrity Big Brother 2011, also known as Celebrity Big Brother 8, is the eighth series of the British reality television series Celebrity Big Brother. It was the first series of Celebrity Big Brother to air on Channel 5, and the first celebrity series not to air in January since Celebrity Big Brother 2, which was broadcast in November 2002. The series launched on 18 August 2011, and ended after 22 days on 8 September 2011, making it the shortest Channel 5 series. It was followed by the twelfth regular series, which launched the following night after the final. Davina McCall did not return to host the main show, and was replaced by former winner Brian Dowling. Emma Willis presented the spin-off show Big Brother's Bit on the Side, alongside Jamie East and Alice Levine. Marcus Bentley returned as commentator for the live shows and highlights whilst also providing voice over for viewer competitions.

In keeping with the celebrity theme, the first edition of OK! TV When Bruv Takes Over aired on 17 August, the eve of the launch night. Following intense press speculation, the exact line-up of celebrity housemates remained a mystery until launch night. For the first time, the celebrity version was staged prior to the main show. Like the previous celebrity series on Channel 4, it was sponsored by Freederm.

The series was won by Irish traveller and reality television star Paddy Doherty, with Kerry Katona as runner-up.

Jedward returned to the house for Celebrity Big Brother 19 as All-Stars, representing this series. They finished as runners-up to Coleen Nolan.

== Format ==
Celebrity Big Brother is a game show in which a group of celebrity contestants, referred to as housemates, live in isolation from the outside world in a custom built "house", constantly under video surveillance. During their time in the House, the housemates are required to nominate two of their fellow contestants for potential eviction, and the two or more with the most votes would be nominated. This process is mandatory for all housemates, and failure to comply could result in expulsion from the House. The public then vote, with one of those celebrities evicted from the house. When the final week arrives, the viewers vote for which of the remaining celebrities should win the series, and the housemate with the most votes becomes the winner.

During their time in the House, housemates are given weekly tasks to perform. The housemates wager a portion of their weekly shopping budget on the task, and either win double their wagered fund or lose the wagered fund depending on their performance in the task. The housemates are required to work as a group to complete their tasks, with the format of the tasks varying based on the number of remaining housemates. Throughout the series, some housemates have been given secret tasks that must either be completed individually or with a small group; failure to do so can result in the housemate being nominated or punished in the House. Should the housemates run out of the food provided for them, an emergency ration was available to them. The housemates are forbidden from discussing nominations, and doing so could result in punishment. The format of the series is mainly seen as a social experiment, and requires housemates to interact with others who may have differing ideals, beliefs, and prejudices. Housemates are also required to make visits to the Diary Room during their stay in the House, where they are able to share their thoughts and feelings on their fellow housemates and the game.

== Housemates ==
Celebrity	Age on entry	Notability	Day entered	Day exited	Status
Paddy Doherty	52	Reality TV star	1	22	Winner
Kerry Katona	30	Media personality and singer	1	22	Runner-up
Jedward (Note: "Jedward" is the collective name for the twins John and Edward Grimes who entered the House together on Day 1 and were treated as a single Housemate for the duration of the series.)	19	Singers	1	22	3rd place
Amy Childs	21	Reality TV star	1	22	4th place
Lucien Laviscount	19	Actor	1	22	5th place
Darryn Lyons	45	Paparazzo	1	22	6th place
Bobby Sabel	25	Model	1	22	7th place
Tara Reid	35	Actress and model	1	16	Evicted
Pamela Bach Hasselhoff	47	Actress	1	14	Evicted
Sally Bercow	41	Political activist	1	9	Evicted

=== Amy Childs ===
Amy Childs (born 7 June 1990) is a British reality television star and model, best known for appearing in the ITV2 semi-reality programme The Only Way Is Essex, for the first two series. During her time, she flirted with fellow housemate Lucien, and developed rivalry against Kerry. On Day 22, Childs left the house in fourth place.

=== Bobby Sabel ===
Bobby Sabel is a British fashion model. Sabel has modelled in New York and Paris, which he is currently signed to Elite Model Management. On Day 22, Bobby was the first housemate to be evicted on finale night, finishing in seventh place.

=== Darryn Lyons ===
Darryn Lyons (born 19 August 1965) is an Australian paparazzo, media personality and entrepreneur, best known for his paparazzi work in Britain. He has worked for newspaper firms such as News of the World and the Daily Mail. Lyons gained widespread media attention when he sold a photograph, which was used to support a claim that David Beckham was having an affair with his personal assistant Rebecca Loos. On Day 2, he celebrated his 46th birthday in the House, after the housemates passed a task. As a reward, the housemates threw a paparazzi-themed party for him. On Day 22, he was the second evictee on finale night, finishing in sixth place.

=== Jedward ===
Jedward (born John & Edward Grimes; 16 October 1991) are an Irish identical twin singing duo, who rose to fame appearing as finalists on the sixth series on The X Factor. They also competed as Ireland's participation in the Eurovision Song Contest 2011. On Day 22, Jedward were announced to have finished in third place.

=== Kerry Katona ===
Kerry Katona (born 6 September 1980) is a British media personality and singer. She began her career as a member of the girl band, Atomic Kitten from 1998 to 2001. After her departure from the band, Katona became the face of reality television, winning the third series of I'm a Celebrity...Get Me Out of Here! and appearing on Dancing on Ice. On Day 1, Kerry was the first housemate to enter the House, and was set a secret task to become the "biggest diva". She later failed, and as punishment, was automatically nominated for the first eviction. During her time in the house, she developed a showmance with Lucien, and a rivalry against Amy. On Day 20, she celebrated her 31st birthday in the House. On Day 22, she was the runner-up of the series.

=== Lucien Laviscount ===
Lucien Laviscount (born 9 June 1992) is a British actor and model, most famous for playing Ben Richardson in the ITV soap opera, Coronation Street and Jonah Kirby in the BBC drama, Waterloo Road. He once appeared in a M&S advert as a child alongside David Beckham. During his time in the house, he developed showmances with Amy and Kerry. On Day 22, he was evicted from the house, positioning fifth.

=== Paddy Doherty ===
Patrick "Paddy" Doherty (born 6 February 1959) is an Irish traveller, bare-knuckle fighter and television personality, who featured on Danny Dyer's Deadliest Men and the 2010 Channel 4 programme My Big Fat Gypsy Wedding. Doherty made it to the final and was crowned the winner of the series on Day 22, beating Kerry Katona.

=== Pamela Bach-Hasselhoff ===
Pamela Bach (born Pamela Ann Weissenbach; 16 October 1963 - 5 March 2025), also known as Pamela Bach-Hasselhoff, is an American actress. She gained notoriety from her previous marriage to David Hasselhoff. She worked with her now ex-husband on Baywatch, and had a recurring role as a psychologist in the series Sirens. In the house, she had her own bedroom with ensuite bathroom. Pamela was evicted from the house on Day 14. During her eviction, she was asked to give four housemates immunity from the next eviction. She chose Kerry, Jedward, Amy, and Paddy. Bach died on 5 March 2025.

=== Sally Bercow ===
Sally Bercow (born Sally Kate Illman; 22 November 1969) is a British political activist and media personality, and the wife of the speaker for the House of Commons, John Bercow. She attracted public criticism when a photograph of her wearing nothing but a bed sheet, and also looking outside to the House of Commons, had appeared in the London Evening Standard newspaper. She was the first celebrity to be evicted on Day 9.

=== Tara Reid ===
Tara Reid (born 8 November 1975) is an American actress, best known for her starring roles in The Big Lebowski, the American Pie films and Scrubs. Tara was the third person to be evicted on Day 16.

== House guests ==
Former Harrods owner Mohamed Al-Fayed entered the house as a houseguest on Day 3 and set the celebrity housemates a task based on dressing up as Egyptian mummies.

On the live eviction show of 26 August, Brian Dowling confirmed that the Michelin star-winning celebrity chef and restaurateur Marco Pierre White is visiting the house "to turn up the heat" on Day 10. White set the housemates a cooking task.

On the Day 12 "Fright Night"-themed task, American actors Anton Yelchin and Christopher Mintz-Plasse visited the house to present the winning housemates with tickets for a screening of their film.

On the Final Night, Pamela Anderson entered the house and took her place as celebrity houseguest alongside the main houseguests on Big Brother 2011 which launched the next day.

== Nominations table ==
	Day 2	Day 11	Day 14	Day 22 Final		Nominations received
Paddy	Not eligible	Bobby, Pamela	No nominations	Winner (Day 22)		0
Kerry	Bobby, Sally	Pamela, Tara	No nominations	Runner-up (Day 22)		0
Jedward	Not eligible	Lucien, Darryn	No nominations	Third place (Day 22)		0
Amy	Not eligible	Pamela, Bobby	No nominations	Fourth place (Day 22)		0
Lucien	Not eligible	Pamela, Darryn	No nominations	Fifth place (Day 22)		1
Darryn	Not eligible	Pamela, Tara	No nominations	Sixth place (Day 22)		5
Bobby	Not eligible	Pamela, Darryn	No nominations	Seventh place (Day 22)		4
Tara	Not eligible	Pamela, Darryn	No nominations	Evicted (Day 16)		2
Pamela	Not eligible	Darryn, Bobby	Amy, Jedward, Kerry, Paddy	Evicted (Day 14)		7
Sally	Not eligible	Evicted (Day 9)				1
Notes	1	none	2	3		
Against public vote	Bobby, Kerry, Sally	Darryn, Pamela	Bobby, Darryn, Lucien, Tara	Amy, Bobby, Darryn, Jedward, Kerry, Lucien, Paddy		
Evicted	Sally; Fewest votes to save	Pamela; Fewest votes to save	Tara; Fewest votes to save	Bobby; Fewest votes (out of 7)	Darryn; Fewest votes (out of 6)	
Evicted	Sally; Fewest votes to save	Pamela; Fewest votes to save	Tara; Fewest votes to save	Lucien; Fewest votes (out of 5)	Amy; Fewest votes (out of 4)	
Evicted	Sally; Fewest votes to save	Pamela; Fewest votes to save	Tara; Fewest votes to save	Jedward; Fewest votes (out of 3)	Kerry; Fewest votes (out of 2)	
Evicted	Sally; Fewest votes to save	Pamela; Fewest votes to save	Tara; Fewest votes to save	Paddy; Most votes to win		

Notes

- ^Note 1: Because Kerry failed her secret task, she was automatically nominated for eviction. She also had to nominate two people that night.
- ^Note 2: After her eviction, Pamela was asked by Brian to choose four housemates to save from the next eviction, she chose Jedward, Amy, Paddy and Kerry. The remaining four housemates were put up for eviction.
- ^Note 3: This week the public were voting for the housemate they wanted to win rather than to save.

== Summary ==
Day 1	Entrances	Kerry, Tara, Paddy, Amy, Darryn, Sally, Lucien, Pamela, Bobby, and Jedward entered the House.
Day 1	Twists	Kerry was called to the Diary Room and given a secret task by Big Brother, which required her to be the biggest "diva" in the house. Her task required that she complete three mini tasks in order to pass, which were: to throw a tantrum, swap beds with another housemate then decide to swap back, and use the line "Don't you know who I am?" to three other housemates.
Day 2	Tasks	Kerry continued her secret task. The remaining housemates were asked and had to vote individually who they thought was the "biggest diva" in the house. If the majority voted for her, she would pass. If not, she would be punished.
Day 2	Punishments	As her fellow housemates selected Jedward as the "biggest diva", Kerry failed her task and as punishment, she was automatically put up for the first eviction of the series.
Day 2	Nominations	Also from the failure of her task, Kerry was required to nominate two other housemates to join alongside her. She chose Bobby and Sally.
Day 3	Entrances	Mohammed Al-Fayed arrived in as a houseguest, to set the housemates an Egyptian mummy-themed task. (See tasks).
Day 3	Tasks	The housemates were met in the garden, where Fayed (dressed up as a Pharaoh) acted as judge for the task. Firstly, they had to lie down on the ground and "rise from the dead" at the sound of a gong, whoever was the last left to rise was deemed the loser. Next, they played "Egyptian tomb" musical chairs to "Walk Like an Egyptian". Fayed selected Tara as the winner. Tara then dressed up as a Pharaoh and commanded her fellow housemates to kneel, bark, and hug each other. All housemates successfully passed the task, and were awarded with an Egyptian-themed party.
Day 4	Tasks	Housemates participated in a bed sheet catwalk fashion show, in reference to Sally's controversial photoshoot in the House of Commons.; Meanwhile, Bobby and Lucien were asked by Big Brother, to devise a fake task to fool the other housemates. They successfully passed the task in doing so.
Day 5	Tasks	Darryn was set a "shock horror" paparazzi task, in which he was required to take five snapshots of the housemates that corresponded to the five matching headlines. These five headlines that were included in The Daily Grazzler were: 'Get Hoff Me' (with Lucien in his beach shorts frolicking with Pamela), 'When Paddy met Sally' (Paddy and Sally sat together on a sofa, and Darryn secretly photographing from behind), 'Storm in a D-Cup' (Amy dressed in her bikini holding a mug), 'Love is in the Air' (Lucien and Amy lounging in the garden with skimpy clothes on), and 'O Brother, Where art Thou?' (with one Jedward twin spotted alone). As Darryn managed to successfully capture all five photos, the housemates were awards with a paparazzi-themed party.
Day 6	Tasks	Jedward did a "shock" task, in which the pair had to remain at least five metres apart from each other at all times or face getting zapped if they are too close. The boys then allowed their fellow housemates to get to know them as individuals. At the end, they reunited and were allowed back into their 'everyday clobber'. However, the other housemates had to answer questions by Big Brother, to see how well they really got to know the boys and were given one minute to work out who is John and who is Edward. Housemates successfully passed the task, and were awarded with a disco.
Day 7	Tasks	Big Brother set up its first shopping task, based on The Wizard of Oz with the housemates playing characters from the story. The three nominated housemates: Bobby, Kerry, and Sally played Dorothy and each had the duty to nominate other housemates for the Oz-themed roles. Paddy was chosen to play Toto, Darryn had to play the Tinman looking for a heart, Amy was nominated to play the Scarecrow and won her knowledge-based task, Pamela was given the role of the Cowardly Lion, and Lucien was given the part of the Wicked Witch of the West. As part of his role, Lucien had to avoid all contact with water excluding taking a shower, and had to drink a special "Wicked Witch's brew". He later passed this task. Jedward played the Munchkins. As part of their task, one Dorothy had to remain on the yellow brick road at all times. However, the Dorothy's ultimately failed their task thanks to Kerry stepping off the road for a cigarette. Darryn as Tinman showed he had a heart by giving up the chance to see his pet macaw in order to let Tara hear a phone message from her husband, having completed 3 mini-tasks in total.
Day 8	Tasks	The Wizard of Oz-themed shopping task continued. Pamela passed a courage test by a magician in the Diary Room. Later on, Big Brother told all housemates that they had successfully passed the Wizard of Oz shopping task, by succeeding in passing 4 out of the 6 challenges making up the overall task.
Day 9	Exits	Sally became the first housemate to be evicted from the House.
Day 10	Entrances	Celebrity chef Marco Pierre White arrived in a houseguest, in order to set the housemates a cooking task called "Big Brother's Big Cook-Off". (See tasks).
Day 10	Tasks	Prior to the cooking task, the large task room was transformed into a cordon-bleu kitchen. They did the task in pairs and had 30 minutes to prepare the dish to same standard as the Chef. White judged the version by Tara and Lucien's green team as the best, with Kerry and Paddy a close-runner-up. Bobby, Amy, and Darryn's blue team and Pamela's red team also performed well. Jedward's yellow team's effort was judged the worst. As a result of winning, Tara and Lucien were invited to a private dinner of steak and wine for two.
Day 11	Nominations	Darryn and Pamela received the most nominations from the housemates, and therefore faced the second eviction.
Day 11	Punishments	As a result of Bobby and Tara discussing nominations, Big Brother warned the housemates that the hot water had been cut off.
Day 12	Tasks	Housemates were set a garlic-based task. They were teamed into rival pairs and tasked to consume a variety of vomit-inducing garlic-based food and drink items for "vampire defence practice" in the small task room. The tasks were judged by referees dressed in bat costumes. The winners would get a golden ticket to the film show. Tara and Amy went first with garlic smoothies, Tara won. Darryn and Bobby were next eating garlic cereal, with Bobby winning confidently. Kerry and Pamela were served garlic chocolates, Pamela won. John competed against Edward with garlic jelly, John won. Lucien and Paddy vied for eating the most garlic ice-cream, in which Paddy was the winner. Most of the housemates became violently sick after the contest.; The winners viewed the movie in the large task room with an audience of viewers who had won a Channel 5 competition to join the screening dressed head-to-toe in skeleton outfits to hide their identities from the housemates.
Day 12	Entrances	The stars of Fright Night, Anton Yelchin and Christopher Mintz-Plasse presented the winners with cinema tickets to see an exclusive viewing of the film. Edward was awarded a bonus ticket for eating a garlic kebab.
Day 13	Tasks	Big Brother set a task for the housemates, to pair up and one of them to be turned as an identical twin. The four pairings were: Paddy and Kerry (Kerry dressed up as Paddy), Pamela and Bobby (Bobby dressed as Pamela), Darryn and Lucien (Lucien dressed as Darryn), and Amy and Tara (Tara dressed as Amy). Jedward were declared "Head Twins", and had to judge each pairing as they copied and mimicked each dominant twin.
Day 14	Punishments	Jedward received a punishment from Big Brother, for purposefully wrecking the bedroom and garden.
Day 14	Exits	Pamela was the second housemate to be evicted from the House.
Day 14	Twists	Shortly after her eviction, Pamela was asked which four housemates she would like to save from the next eviction. She chose Jedward, Kerry, Amy, and Paddy.
Day 14	Nominations	Since Pamela saved Jedward, Kerry, Amy, and Paddy from the public vote, it was revealed that Bobby, Darryn, Lucien, and Tara had been nominated for the next eviction.
Day 15	Tasks	The housemates participated in their second shopping task, "Stuck in the Lidl with You". They first had to hold filled shopping bags with their arms outstretched until they fell. In the second part, Bobby and Kerry competed against Jedward in a trolley dash. Jedward won and were rewarded with choosing the week's shopping list. In a surprise twist, in part 3 of the task, Jedward "left" the house to do the shopping on the outside.
Day 16	Entrances	Jedward "re-entered" the house in the early hours of the morning, having been tasked in doing a 2.5 minute supermarket dash and grab to collect two trolley-loads of food for the house. The excitable pair woke up the house having brought home an assortment of food items including bananas, blueberries, bread and a leg of lamb and played with their massive stockpile of children's sweets they had purchased. Darryn moaned about their food choices.
Day 16	Tasks	Amy was called to the Diary Room, where she was given her vajazzling kit and instructed to turn the sunloungers into an Essex-style vajazzle parlour. She decorated the other housemates with diamante including a nervous Paddy. As a reward for completing the task, Amy got a visit from her pet pug, Prince Childs.
Day 16	Exits	Tara became the third housemate to be evicted from the House.
Day 17	Tasks	Big Brother announced that the task was for the house to divide into rival 1990s boy and girl bands in a task called 'Celebrity Battle of the Bands'. Darryn, Bobby, John and Paddy formed the Take That tribute boyband "Take This" and Kerry, Edward, Lucien and Amy formed the girl group "KELA", with the boys in drag. The bands were tasked to record a dance and singing routine to be posted on the show's website with the winner selected by public vote. The winner would be revealed on the night of Day 18.
Day 18	Tasks	The 'Celebrity Battle of the Bands' task continued. "Take This" ultimately won. The rival bands were then set a "face off" task, trying to keep a fixed smile while keeping still and staring out their opponents with their eyes fixed ahead. After the others were dismissed as fails by Big Brother, Lucien and John were the final grinning housemates. John won the task after Lucien rolled his eyes after 1 hour 46 minutes of frozen gurning.
Day 19	Tasks	The housemates participated in a task, which required them to sort M&M's into their separate colours.
Day 20	Tasks	Housemates were tasked with assembling their dream pizza in the garden, while being suspended from bungee ropes. Next, they took part in a "Pizza Run", where each of them were placed in a giant inflatable. Big Brother announced that Jedward, Bobby and Paddy's team had won the pizza task. They were rewarded with chicken, pineapple and pepperoni pizzas like the ones they made for the task.
Day 22	Exits	Bobby left in seventh place. Darryn followed up in sixth, whilst Lucien positioned fifth. Amy was evicted into fourth place. Jedward finished 3rd. Paddy was announced as the winner of the series, meaning Kerry was the runner-up.
Day 22	Entrances	Pamela Anderson entered the house as a houseguest, to join the twelfth regular series, which launched the night after.

== Production ==
=== Presenters ===
Former Big Brother winner Brian Dowling replaced Davina McCall as the presenter of the show. Emma Willis was presenter of new spin-off show Big Brother's Bit on the Side. Marcus Bentley retained his role as off-screen narrator for the highlights shows. He also commentated on the live nights and provided voice-overs for the viewer competitions.

=== Trailers ===
From 23 July 2011, trailers announcing the imminent return of the series were aired on Channel 5 voiced by Marcus Bentley. Former housemates that featured in one of the trailers included Josie Gibson, Dowling and Sam Pepper. This coincided with the launch of the new eye logo for 2011. In the run-up to Celebrity Big Brother, the channel heavily featured a promotional campaign under the slogan "When Bruv Takes Over" based on the David Guetta and Kelly Rowland song "When Love Takes Over". It featured a large cast of past housemates dancing and miming in the streets, finally meeting up in a park with CGI effects adding a fly-past with coloured smoke overhead.

=== Live feed ===
With varying controversy, there was no 24-hour live feed in Celebrity Big Brother 2011 unlike most years on Channel 4. Channel 5 concentrated on the daily highlights shows, the eviction shows and instead placed clips from action in the house on a dedicated website and social media.

=== Title sequence ===
The main motif for the show's titles was a space-age-style, revolving 3D glowing eye. As usual the title sequence was kept secret until the launch. For the first time in the show's history, housemates were included in the title sequences, showing various parts of their face/top part of body. The on-screen graphics and highlights editing were the show's most biggest change to date with names superimposed over the housemates and music used in every scene. In between the highlights, the show flashed up clips portraits of the housemates' faces.

=== House ===
On 10 August, Digital Spy published its first look at the new Celebrity Big Brother house for the new Channel 5 series in readiness for the first intake of celebrity housemates. It revealed a colourful, opulent look with a return to the luxury feel of the early Channel 4 series. It featured a bar, gym, sauna, an open-plan bathroom, the UK series' largest swimming pool thus far. In the celebrity series, the shower enclosure was screened off from public view but this was changed to a clear view for the main series. There was also a large outdoor area and a sophisticated range of designer furnishings and fittings. This made a radical contrast with the shift to an austere, claustrophobic house seen in the later Channel 4 series.

=== Cameras and surveillance system ===
The housemates were watched by a network of 47 cameras 24/7, the largest number of cameras to date. The show was broadcast in high-definition for the first time in its history. In preparation for HDTV broadcast standard, the house was illuminated with a super-bright overhead lighting rig.

=== Diary Room ===
On 15 August 2011, viewers were shown the Big Brother 2011 diary chair. It was in the style of a luxury club chair in deep red with gold trim. The luxurious feel was enhanced by a dramatic entrance way to the diary room with strip lighting and mirrored surfaces. In a break with the original convention of no contact with the outside world, during visits to the diary room, housemates were invited to answer trivia questions contributed by Facebook members during the spin-off show, Big Brother's Bit on the Side on 5*. They also received messages from relatives and visits from pets. The diary room led to the small task room where challenges were set for the housemates.

=== Launch night ===
The show went live on 18 August. A group of ten initial housemates entered the house through the big eye via a catwalk leading up to a flight of steps, crossing a swingbridge shaped like the Big Brother eye. Marcus Bentley narrated each contestant's details as they made their entrance. Kerry Katona was announced as the first celebrity housemate to enter the new Big Brother house followed by American Pie actress Tara Reid Reality TV stars Paddy Doherty from My Big Fat Gypsy Wedding and Amy Childs from ITV 2's The Only Way Is Essex joined them. Australian paparazzi and media personality Darryn Lyons was next to join the house followed by Sally Bercow. British actor Lucien Laviscount was next with ex Baywatch actress Pamela Bach preceding him. British model Bobby Sabel was next, with Irish pop duo Jedward the last to enter the house.

=== Launch night twist ===
Following the housemates' entrance into the house, Big Brother called one housemate to the Diary Room. Kerry Katona took up the offer and in the process nominated herself for a secret task. Her mission was to become the 'biggest celebrity diva' which entailed three mini tasks. Her first task was to throw an "A-list" celebrity-style tantrum, second to ask three housemates, "do you know who I am?", thirdly, to demand to swap beds and then swap back. The next day, the housemates voted for whom they judged to be the biggest diva in the house. Kerry had to be selected or she would be punished. Kerry failed as Jedward were selected as the biggest divas in the house. She was told that her punishment was to face the public vote for eviction and she also had to nominate two other of her housemates to join her for eviction. She nominated Bobby and Sally. The further twist was that the public voted to save Kerry, Bobby or Sally. The loser was Sally, who had the fewest votes to save and was evicted at the first eviction show on Day 9.

=== Press reaction ===
The media gave the relaunched show a mixed reaction. Michael Hogan of The Telegraph claimed that many of the housemates are "notable only for who [sic] they married or for taking part in other reality shows".

=== Sister shows ===
==== Celebrity Big Brother's Bit on the Side ====
This is the main spin-off show for Big Brother. In this series it was hosted by Emma Willis with co-hosts Jamie East and Alice Levine. The first edition followed the launch night show at 10:30pm on Thursday 18 August with the celebrities in the house and the first task set. Lauren Harries acted as fashion expert on the launch night show, castigating the styling of the new housemates. The show was similar to ex-spin off shows Big Brother's Little Brother and Big Brother's Big Mouth, but is shown after the main show. The debut show was watched by 1.82 million viewers (receiving 13.4%). It returned along with the ninth series of the main celebrity show in January 2012.

==== OK! TV: When Bruv Takes Over ====
This is a special edition of the main OK! TV magazine show broadcast from the Big Brother compound in the Elstree Studio. The first edition aired on Wednesday 17 August where viewers were given a preview of the new Big Brother house on the eve of the launch of Celebrity Big Brother 2011. The show is presented by Jenny Frost and Jeff Brazier.

==== New features ====
The main elements of the classic Big Brother format have remained in place since the shift to Channel 5. Narrator Marcus Bentley has taken on a more prominent role in the live shows by contributing narration to the opening titles and doing voiceovers to the entrance and exits of the housemates. He has also adopted a more animated vocal style since the move. New presenter Brian Dowling also introduced some innovations of his own. On eviction nights, he uses the new catchphrase, "[housemates up for eviction], your time has come!"

== Ratings ==
The launch show received 5.3 million viewers, a 21.9% launch share, and also peaked at 8 million, winning its time slot. It gave Channel 5 its highest-ever audience outside of sports programmes and films, and one of its top five ratings of all time.

	Official viewers (millions)			
	Week 1		Week 2	Week 3
Saturday		3.15	2.24	1.94
Sunday		2.47	2.54	2.77
Monday		2.69	2.63	2.69
Tuesday		2.84	2.69	2.4
Wednesday		2.92	2.61	2.46
Thursday	5.27	2.88	2.45	3.23
Friday	3.37	3.04	2.63	
Weekly average	3.18		2.54	2.58
Running average	3.18		2.86	2.77
Series average	2.81			
blue-coloured boxes denote live shows.
