= Tough Love (novel) =

2007 novel by Kerry Katona

- Cover of the hardback edition
- Author: Kerry Katona; Fanny Blake
- Language: English
- Genre: Novel
- Publisher: Ebury Press
- Publication date: 18 October 2007
- Publication place: United Kingdom
- Media type: Print (Hardback, Paperback)
- Pages: 320 pp (first edition, hardback)
- ISBN: 0-09-192319-0 (first edition, hardback)
- OCLC: 190966720
- Followed by: The Footballer's Wife

Tough Love is a novel written by Kerry Katona. It was published on 18 October 2007. It is the first in a trilogy of novels following the Crompton family.

== Plot summary ==
Leanne Crompton is a successful glamour model. But when she is sacked by her modelling agency because she's gotten too old she soon finds herself penniless. She decides to move her and her seven-year child Kia back to her home town and to her wayward family. Leanne's mother, Tracy is an extreme alcoholic; and her two sisters, Jodie and Karina, want to escape Leanne's shadow; while her younger brother, Scott, is being cheated on by his girlfriend Charly. They all seem so lost in life, including Leanne, except for her older brother, Markie, who has just been released from prison. Having to start from the bottom once again proves tough for Leanne especially due to the secret she burdens, the celebrity identity of her daughter Kia. She questions whether or not to reveal her secret to her mum, who has a habit of selling stories to the newspapers. But before she gets the chance tell anyone, Kia's dad catches up to Leanne and tries unsuccessfully to silence her forever.

== Critical reception ==
The book received mixed reviews. In The News.com said of the novel "The characters may be textbook, the plot predictable and the 'explosive secret' guessable around page five, but the basic package is there." While Henry Sutton of The Mirror said "Tough Love comes laden with grit, and, thankfully, some humour, plus heaps of diverse characters who might not quite hold your attention."
