= Danny Dyer's Deadliest Men =

Television series

- Genre: Documentary
- Starring: Danny Dyer
- Country of origin: United Kingdom
- Original language: English
- No. of series: 2
- No. of episodes: 16

Production
- Running time: 43 mins.

Original release
- Network: Bravo
- Release: 20 October 2008 – 28 September 2009

Danny Dyer's Deadliest Men (Danny Dyer's Deadliest Men 2: Living Dangerously in Series 2) is a documentary series broadcast on Bravo between 20 October 2008 and 28 September 2009. It followed Danny Dyer as he embarked on meeting men he considers deadly. The show has since been repeated on Sky One, Sky Two, and Pick.

== Episodes ==
=== Series 1 (2008) ===
In series 1 Dyer met the featured person over a few days.

Episode	Broadcast Date	Deadliest Man/Men
1	20 October 2008	Stephen French
2	27 October 2008	Nigel Ely
3	20 October 2008	Vic Dark
4	3 November 2008	Sam "Skelly" McCrory
5	10 November 2008	Barrington Patterson
6	17 November 2008	Peter Bleksley
7	24 November 2008	Dominic Negus
8	1 December 2008	Bradley Welsh

=== Series 2 (2009) ===
In a change to the format, Dyer stayed with the men featured on the series as the show was filmed.

Episode	Broadcast Date	Deadliest Man/Men
1	10 August 2009	Paddy Doherty
2	17 August 2009	Elijah Kerr
3	24 August 2009	David McMillan
4	31 August 2009	Mo Teague
5	7 September 2009	Dave & Ian Butlin
6	14 September 2009	Steve Sinclair
7	21 September 2009	Bernard O'Mahoney
8	28 September 2009	Best of Series 2
