= Kerry Katona =

English media personality and singer (born 1980)

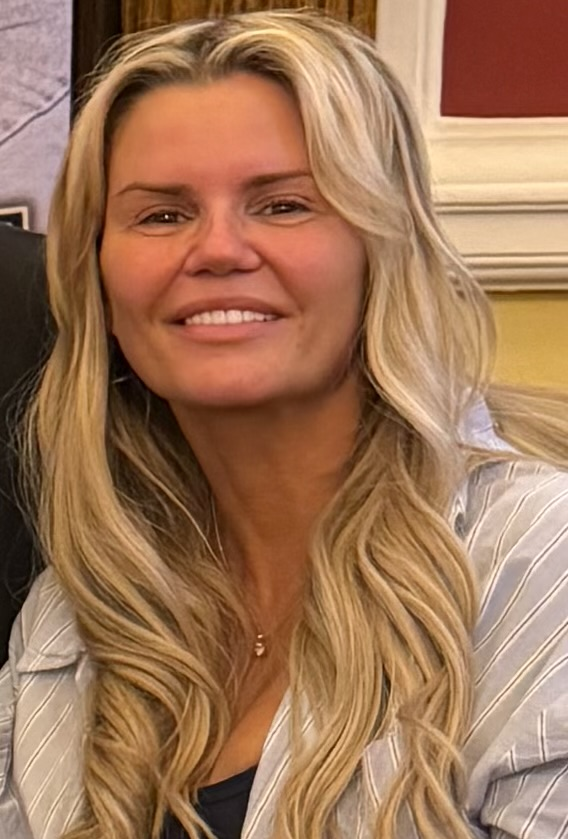
- Katona in 2025
- Born: Kerry Jayne Elizabeth Katona; 6 September 1980 (age 46); Warrington, Cheshire, England
- Occupations: Media personality; singer
- Years active: 1998–present
- Spouses: Brian McFadden (m. 2002; div. 2004) Mark Croft (m. 2007; div. 2011) George Kay (m. 2014; div. 2017)
- Partner: Paolo Margaglione (2025–present)
- Children: 5
- Musical career
- Instruments: Vocals
- Formerly of: Atomic Kitten
- Website: kerrykatona.co.uk

Kerry Jayne Elizabeth Katona (born 6 September 1980) is an English media personality and former singer. She was an original member of the pop girl group Atomic Kitten between 1998 and 2001, leaving as the group's success peaked. Katona won the third series of I'm a Celebrity...Get Me Out of Here in 2004, and subsequently went on to appear on various other reality television shows. Katona's personal life and subsequent drug addiction became the subject of the British tabloid press and she began starring in several MTV UK reality series documenting her life, including Kerry Katona: Crazy in Love (2008), Kerry Katona: Whole Again (2008), Kerry Katona: What's The Problem? (2009) and Kerry Katona: Coming Clean (2010).

She was a contestant on the sixth series of Dancing on Ice and the eighth series of Celebrity Big Brother in 2011, as well as starring in an ITV2 reality series Kerry Katona: The Next Chapter. She appeared on The Big Reunion in 2013 which saw her reunite with Atomic Kitten for the next four years. After leaving the group again, she went on to win the reality competitions Celebs on the Farm and Celebrity Ghost Trip in 2021, as well as appearing on Celebs Go Dating twice in 2019 and 2025, respectively.

== Early life ==
Kerry Jayne Elizabeth Katona was born on 6 September 1980 in Warrington, Cheshire to Sue Katona. Katona's maternal grandfather was a Hungarian who fled Budapest to London during the Second World War. She never had a relationship with her father Ronnie Armstrong, who died of cancer in 2008. As a child she was placed in care and brought up by four sets of foster parents and attended eight different schools. She left school aged 16 and became a lap dancer, touring Europe. She posed topless for Page 3 in The Sun at the age of 17 and posed for the men's publication Zoo. She also worked as a glamour model, appearing in publications like New!, Now, and Star.

== Career ==
=== 1998–2001: Atomic Kitten ===
In 1998, Katona auditioned for a new girl group created by OMD frontman Andy McCluskey and was chosen, along with Liz McClarnon and Heidi Range – replaced by Natasha Hamilton in 1999. The group became Atomic Kitten and their debut single, "Right Now", was released on 29 November 1999, reaching number 10 in the UK. Following this initial success, the group released three more singles that failed to reach the top 5 and a debut album that peaked at number 29. Atomic Kitten's record label, Innocent Records, was considering dropping them because of their limited success, but were persuaded to allow the group to release "Whole Again" on 29 January 2001. Katona shot the music video, but left the group two days before release because of an unexpected pregnancy and conflicts with the other members.

She was subsequently replaced by former Precious singer Jenny Frost and their debut album was re-released with the new vocalist. With Frost, "Whole Again" reached number one in 18 other countries, and the group had four number one singles in the UK, two number one albums and estimated sales of 10 million records.

=== 2002–2012: Reality television and media career ===
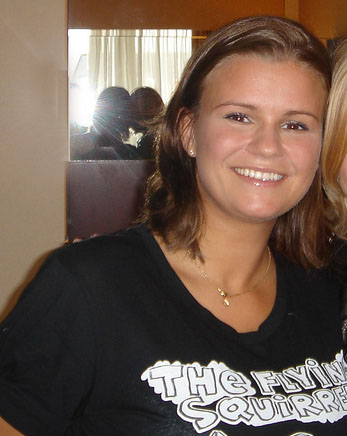
Katona in 2008

In 2002, Katona presented the ITV's dating show ElimiDate and appeared on Lily Savage's Blankety Blank. She also appeared as judge on the RTÉ talent show You're a Star. In 2004, she won the third series of the ITV reality show I'm a Celebrity... Get Me Out of Here!. The same year, Katona began appearing in numerous advertisements for the supermarket chain Iceland. In 2005, Katona starred her own reality show, My Fair Kerry, on ITV. In 2008, she released her debut fragrance Outrageous. Katona notably appeared on the ITV daytime programme This Morning in October 2008, during which her speech was slurred and hosts Phillip Schofield and Fern Britton raised concerns about her welfare, to which Katona said was a result of medication she was taking. From 2008 to 2010, Katona starred in five reality shows on MTV UK about her life, rehab and bipolar disorder: Kerry Katona: Crazy in Love (2008), Kerry Katona: Whole Again (2008), Kerry Katona: What's The Problem? (2009), Kerry Katona: Coming Clean (2010).

Between January and February 2011, Katona competed as a contestant on the sixth series of the ITV skating competition Dancing on Ice. She was paired with Daniel Whiston and the paired qualified for the competition, after topping the first public vote. Katona's scores plateaued throughout her time in the competition, with her and Whiston receiving their lowest scores in the fifth week, where they became the fifth couple to be eliminated, after losing the skate-off to Jeff Brazier and Isabelle Gauthier, ultimately finishing in eighth place. She also starred in an ITV2 reality series Kerry Katona: The Next Chapter. In August of the same year, Katona entered the Celebrity Big Brother house to compete as a housemate on the eighth series, the first to be broadcast on Channel 5. She had previously attempted to become a housemate on previous series on Channel 4 but she failed the required psychological tests. Katona ultimately reached the final, and finished as runner-up behind Paddy Doherty.

=== 2013–present: Atomic Kitten reunion and other work ===
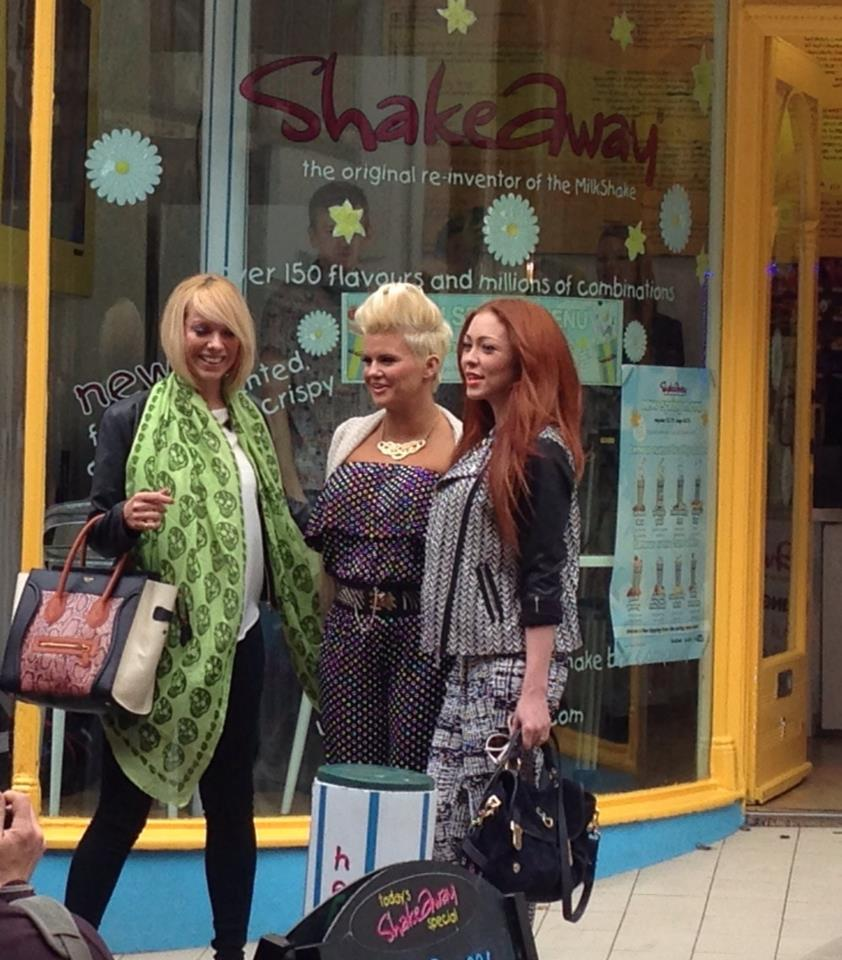
Kerry Katona (centre) with her Atomic Kitten colleagues Liz McClarnon and Natasha Hamilton in May 2013, following their reformation

In 2013, Katona reunited with Liz McClarnon and Natasha Hamilton to reform Atomic Kitten for the reality show The Big Reunion, along with five other pop groups of their time – 911, Honeyz, B*Witched, Five and Liberty X. After the show, they officially reunited and toured for four years. Katona also appeared in advertisements for payday loan company Cash Lady, one of which was banned by the Advertising Standards Authority. In 2017, Katona left Atomic Kitten again following an altercation with Hamilton after a performance in Australia. In 2019, Katona appeared on the sixth series of E4 reality series Celebs Go Dating.

In 2020, during the COVID-19 pandemic, Katona joined OnlyFans. Katona said she joined the site after her media work came to halt during the pandemic and she had been struggling to pay the rent. She has since earned over a £1 million in revenue from subscriptions on the site and credits her "perfect breasts" with her success. She also set up an online fashion business titled Kerry's Boutique, which was closed four years later.

In 2021, Katona appeared as a contestant on the MTV series Celebs on the Farm and the E4 series Celebrity Ghost Trip, the latter of which was alongside her daughter Lilly-Sue McFadden and both of which she won. She also appeared on Fame in the Family and was a contestant on Celebrity SAS: Who Dares Wins, where she was the first recruit to withdraw from the course in the second episode. In 2022, she appeared as a contestant on the E4 series Celeb Cooking School and finished in third place. The same year, she became co-host of the Wheel of Misfortune podcast alongside comedian Alison Spittle.

In August 2025, Katona returned to Celebs Go Dating for its fourteenth series. Between September and November 2025, Katona embarked on a tour alongside Katie Price, An Evening with Katie & Kerry in which they toured venues, performing songs from their discography and discussing their lives. In January 2026, she appeared on an episode of Olivia Attwood: Getting Filthy Rich where she discussed her OnlyFans career. In June 2026, Katona released "Home Again (World Cup 2026)", a re-released version of her former group Atomic Kitten's song "Whole Again" with updated lyrics about the England national football team in the FIFA World Cup 2026. Katona announced that proceeds from the single would be donated to children in foster homes.

== Personal life ==
From 2002 to 2004, Katona was married to singer Brian McFadden and they had two daughters together. In 2005, she began dating taxi driver Mark Croft, whom she married in February 2007 and with whom she had two children, a daughter and a son. In her autobiography, Still Standing, Katona said she met Croft when he was supplying cocaine to her mother. They divorced in 2011. In April 2014, Katona gave birth to her fifth child, a daughter with former rugby league player George Kay, whom she married in September of that year. In October 2015, Katona announced their separation after he allegedly assaulted her at their home in Crowborough and was subsequently arrested by police. Kay died on 5 July 2019 following a cocaine overdose. Despite not living in the United States, Katona endorsed Donald Trump in the 2024 US Presidential Election.

Katona has been in a relationship with Paolo Margaglione since 2025. The two met while filming the reality TV series Celebs Go Dating.

=== Health and drugs abuse ===
Since 2004, Katona has been in rehab several times for cocaine and alcohol abuse, according to her autobiography, Still Standing. In 2009, Iceland Foods and Asda supermarkets broke a long-standing €290,000 advertising campaigns deal with Katona after photographs appeared in the tabloids, allegedly showing her taking cocaine in a bathroom. In 2024, Katona publicly discussed undergoing reconstructive surgery to repair a nasal septum perforation and collapse caused by years of cocaine use, with cartilage from her rib used to rebuild her nose.

Like her mother Sue, Katona was diagnosed with bipolar disorder in 2005. In July 2007, Katona was admitted to the Priory Hospital with a mental health crisis. Katona also has dyslexia and attention deficit hyperactivity disorder (ADHD). Katona is a patron of The Shannon Bradshaw Trust, a Warrington-based charity which helps children with life-threatening conditions.

=== Legal issues ===
In July 2007, Katona, Croft, and their infant daughter Heidi were held hostage, when three men forcibly entered their home in Wilmslow, one of them holding Katona at knife-point while the others forced Croft to show them where valuables were kept. Nobody was physically harmed, but the men left with a blue BMW and other valuables with an estimated total value between £100,000 and £150,000. In August 2008, Katona was declared bankrupt at the High Court in London after failing to pay the final £82,000 of a £417,000 tax bill. In July 2013, Katona filed for bankruptcy again at County Court in Wigan.

In May 2019, Brighton Magistrates' Court ordered Katona to pay a £500 fine after the school attendance rate of one of her children had fallen below 50% in 2018, but her solicitor argued that Katona did not have childcare and had to take the child to work with her.

== Filmography ==
As herself
Year	Title	Notes	Ref.
2002	ElimiDate	Presenter	
2002	You're a Star	Judge	
2003–2004, 2011–2022	Loose Women	Regular panellist / Guest	
2004	I'm a Celebrity...Get Me Out of Here!	Winner; Series 3	
2005	My Fair Kerry	Lead role	
2008	Kerry Katona: Crazy in Love	Lead role	
2008	Kerry Katona: Whole Again	Lead role	
2009	Kerry Katona: What's The Problem?	Lead role	
2010	Kerry Katona: Coming Clean	Lead role	
2011	Dancing on Ice	Contestant; series 6	
2011	Kerry Katona: The Next Chapter	Lead role	
2011	Celebrity Big Brother	Housemate; series 8	
2013	The Big Reunion	Participant	
2019, 2025	Celebs Go Dating	Participant; series 6 and 9	
2021	Celebs on the Farm	Winner; series 3	
2021	Celebrity SAS: Who Dares Wins	Contestant; series 3	
2021	Celebrity Ghost Trip	Winner	
2022	Fame in the Family	Participant	
2022	Celeb Cooking School	Contestant; series 1	
2023	The Big Celebrity Detox	Participant	

== Discography ==
=== Singles ===
Title	Year	Album
"Home Again (World Cup 2026)"	2026	Non-album single

== Bibliography ==
- Katona, Kerry (5 October 2006). Too Much, Too Young: My Story of Love, Survival and Celebrity. Ebury Press. ISBN 978-0-09-191390-8.
- Katona, Kerry (1 March 2007). Survive the Worst and Aim for the Best. Ebury Press. ISBN 978-0-09-191754-8.
- Katona, Kerry (18 October 2007). Tough Love. Ebury Press. ISBN 978-0-09-192319-8.
- Katona, Kerry (3 April 2008). The Footballer's Wife. Ebury Press. ISBN 978-0-09-192324-2.
- Katona, Kerry (22 November 2012). Still Standing: The Autobiography. Orion. ISBN 978-1-40-912746-8.
- Katona, Kerry (13 October 2022). Kerry Katona: Whole Again - Love, Life and Me. Mirror Books. ISBN 978-1-91-530604-3.

Preceded by Phil Tufnell	I'm a Celebrity... Get Me out of Here! Winner & Queen of The Jungle; 2004	Succeeded by Joe Pasquale
