= Aaron Allard-Morgan =

English reality show winner

- Born: November 20, 1980 (age 45); Weston-Super-Mare, England
- Occupation: Reality TV star
- Years active: 2011–2012
- Television: Big Brother UK
- Children: 1

Aaron Allard-Morgan (born 20 November 1980) is an English reality television star. He is best known for winning the twelfth series of Big Brother UK, in 2011.

== Early life ==
Prior to appearing on Big Brother UK, Morgan worked as a contract manager in his hometown of Weston-Super-Mare.

== Big Brother UK ==
In 2011, Morgan appeared on the twelfth series of Big Brother UK, which he won, entering on Day 1. This was the first series of Big Brother UK on Channel 5 after the show left its original broadcaster, Channel 4. Morgan faced the public vote in Weeks 1, 3, 5 and 7, on each occasion he received the highest number of votes to save from the public. On Day 41, he was one of four housemates to win a task, earning him a place at a red carpet premiere of horror movie; Paranormal Activity 3.

Since appearing on Big Brother, Morgan appeared on several television shows including; Big Brother's Bit on the Side, OK! TV and The Wright Stuff. During his interview on The Wright Stuff, he claimed there was no aftercare from Channel 5 and that four of his ex-housemates had attempted to commit suicide due to negative reaction from the public.

== Personal life ==
Morgan lives in Weston-Super-Mare, where he runs a bar. He has a son. He wrote a book about his experience in Big Brother.

== Filmography ==
Film and television
Year	Title	Role	Notes
2011	Big Brother UK series 12	Self; housemate	Winner, 71 episodes
2011-2012	Big Brother's Bit on the Side	Self; ex-housemate	2 episodes
2011-2012	The Wright Stuff	Self; guest	2 episodes
2011	OK! TV	Self; guest	1 episode
