= Sally Bercow =

British public personality

- Born: Sally Kate Illman; 22 November 1969 (age 56); Sutton, London, England
- Education: King Edward's School, Witley; Marlborough College; Keble College, Oxford (dropped out)
- Occupations: Political activist, media personality
- Years active: 2002–present
- Spouse: John Bercow (m. 2002)
- Children: 3

Sally Kate Bercow (née Illman; born 22 November 1969) is a British public personality and the wife of the former Speaker of the House of Commons, John Bercow.

== Early life ==
The daughter of Ronald Illman, of Hindhead, Surrey, Bercow attended the private co-educational King Edward's School in Witley, Surrey. She took her A-levels at Marlborough College, where she was a contemporary of Samantha Cameron. She attended Keble College, Oxford, where she studied Theology for two years, before dropping out. She was the social secretary of the Oxford University Conservative Association.

After university, she pursued a career in public relations and advertising.

== Politics ==
Her future husband, John Bercow, became a Conservative member of parliament at the 1997 general election. She campaigned for New Labour and their candidate Tony Blair; she also campaigned for John Bercow to help win his seat. She campaigned for the election of Ed Balls as leader of the Labour Party in the 2010 Labour leadership election.

In 2010, she stood as Labour candidate for the St James's ward of Westminster City Council, unsuccessfully. Bercow is on the approved list of candidates for members of Parliament for the Labour Party, although following the Lord McAlpine Twitter case (see McAlpine v Bercow and below), she is reportedly unlikely to be considered. Bercow has repeatedly mentioned her desire to become a Labour MP, revealing that she would like to become the Labour candidate for the marginal Brighton Kemptown seat. It was reported that Bercow was in line to stand for Holborn and St Pancras if Frank Dobson retired, and she had been linked to standing to become the Labour prospective parliamentary candidate for Harrow East in 2015.

The Daily Telegraph suggested that Bercow was politicising her husband's neutral role. John Bercow rejected this criticism, stating that "the obligation of impartiality does not apply to my wife who is not my chattel". She has also appeared on the BBC's Question Time.

== Media attention ==
In February 2011, she attracted criticism for appearing to capitalise on her husband's position, when a photograph of her wearing only a bed sheet, with the Houses of Parliament in the background, appeared in the London Evening Standard. In the article she was quoted as saying "becoming Speaker has turned my husband into a sex symbol", although she later claimed, in a radio interview; "It was just meant to be a bit of fun, but obviously it has completely backfired on me and I look a complete idiot." John Bercow was reported as having "read the Riot Act" to her after the bed sheet photo was published.

Bercow was a housemate on Channel 5's Celebrity Big Brother 8 in August 2011. She became the first person to be evicted. She has also appeared on a celebrity edition of The Chase and Big Star's Little Star (with her daughter Jemima). She was initially scheduled to take part in the second series of The Jump, but had to quit after suffering an injury during training.

== Personal life ==
In 2011, Sally Bercow said "I don't mind people knowing about my history of one-night stands and alcoholism ... in my twenties. ... I grew up in my thirties and gained control of myself." She and her husband have been married since 2002, and have three children: Jemima, Oliver, and Freddie. Her elder son, Oliver, has autism. She is a parent patron of the charity Ambitious about Autism.

In 2015, her husband was reported to be seeking to divorce her over an alleged affair with his cousin Alan Bercow, but they reconciled after Sally had left for a period.

== Legal controversies ==
=== McAlpine affair ===
After the 2 November 2012 broadcast of a BBC Two's Newsnight that linked an unnamed "senior Conservative" politician to sex abuse claims, Bercow hinted on her Twitter account at the name of Lord McAlpine, implying that he was a paedophile.

McAlpine took legal action against Bercow and others and, in December 2012, Bercow's solicitors, Carter-Ruck, announced that they were defending her in a £50,000 libel lawsuit filed by McAlpine. On 24 May 2013, the High Court found that Sally Bercow's tweet was libellous. Following the ruling, she accepted a settlement with McAlpine's lawyers to pay an undisclosed sum as damages.

=== Abducted schoolgirl controversy ===
In a tweet of 18 November 2012, Bercow named the schoolgirl involved in an abduction case although the girl's identity was protected by a court order. Two days later Bercow's Twitter account was deleted after what were described as legal gaffes, but she returned to Twitter a week later.
