= David So =

American YouTuber

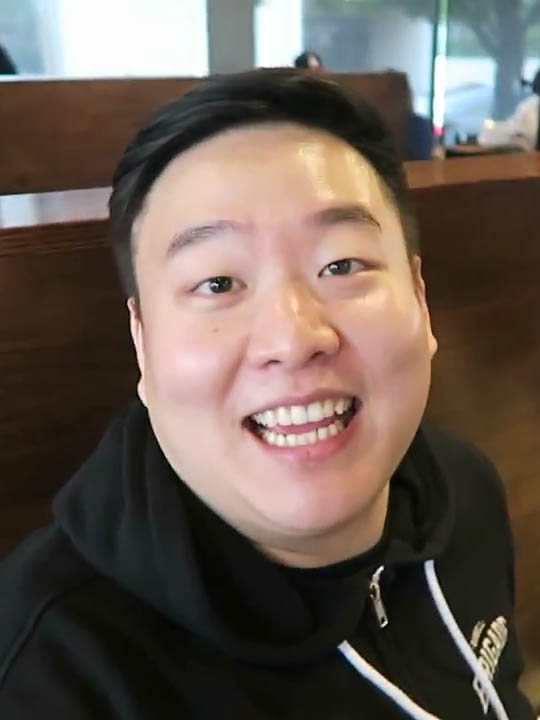
- So in 2016
- Born: March 30, 1987 (age 39); Seoul, South Korea
- Occupations: Comedian; YouTuber; actor
- Spouse: Mariel Song
- Children: 1

YouTube information
- Channels: David So; DavidSoMusic
- Years active: 2011–present
- Genre: Comedy
- Subscribers: 1.46 million (David So); 144 thousand (DavidSoMusic)
- Views: 316.5 million (David So); 35.9 thousand (DavidSoMusic)
- Last updated: July 6, 2020

David So (Korean: 소 인국 So In-Guk) (born March 30, 1987) is an American comedian, YouTuber, actor, entrepreneur, podcast host and musician. He is known for his comedy videos on YouTube. As of January 2020, his main channel David So (formerly DavidSoComedy) has amassed over 1.45 million subscribers and over 310 million views.

== Early life ==
So was born in Seoul, South Korea and raised in Sacramento, California. He grew up working at his parents' African American beauty supply store in Sacramento.

So briefly enrolled at the University of California, Riverside before transferring to community college and subsequently California State University, Sacramento. So later dropped out to pursue comedy after his "Vlog #4: Asians in the Library" went viral.

== Entertainment career ==
=== Stand-up ===
So began his career at age 16 working as a stand-up comedian performing throughout northern California. He performed at various stand-up comedy clubs during the three years he was in college.

=== YouTube ===
So began uploading content onto YouTube as a means of pursuing comedy while working and studying at Sacramento State.

After spending three years as a college student and a working stand-up comedian, So decided to leave school and pursue a career in comedy by migrating his stand-up content to YouTube, where he wrote and produced much of his original work on his first YouTube channel known as DavidSoComedy, which has amassed over 1.45 million subscribers and over 310 million views. In 2011, his video response mocking the video "UCLA Asians in the Library" by Alexandra Wallace, which used derogatory terms against Asians, went viral and, as of March 2015, garnered over 5.5 million views In January 2019, he launched the Genius Brain podcast on his main channel and on other podcasting platforms. The account was briefly renamed Genius Brain to reflect his shift away from skits and vlogs. Episodes are uploaded biweekly on Sundays and Thursdays.

He was a re-occurring cast member of the online series Just Kidding News. So left the show as a recurring cast member in order to focus on other projects in 2019.

He hosted and wrote Vevo's first original scripted series called The Comment Show.

He co-hosts the food show Send Foodz with fellow YouTuber Tim Chantarangsu. The show was picked up by Thrillist shortly after its initial debut on Chantarangsu's channel and airs every other Thursday.

=== Film and television ===
So co-produced and starred in Justin Chon's 2017 film Gook. The film tells the story of two Korean-American brothers, played by So and Chon, running their father's shoe store, and their unlikely friendship with a neighborhood 11-year-old black girl, during the first day of the 1992 Los Angeles riots. The film was released on August 18, 2017, by Samuel Goldwyn Films. It premiered in January 2017 at the Sundance Film Festival, where it won the NEXT Audience Award.

He was featured on actor and comedian Kevin Hart's Laugh Out Loud (LOL) network in 2017.

So was a judge on the 2020 Netflix cooking competition show Best Leftovers Ever! alongside Rosemary Shrager and Jackie Tohn.

== Business ventures ==
=== Apparel ===
Go For Broke was an apparel company co-founded by So and some other business partners. The brand motto was originally used by the 442nd Infantry Regiment in World War II. In 2015, the YouTube channel JustKiddingFilms (JKFilms) came on as a business partner when they sought to expand their own apparel line. JKFilms cofounders, Bart Kwan and Joe Jitsukawa, helped with the company's operations and worked on its rebranding. In 2017, they donated the company to the non-profit, Go For Broke National Education Center, in Little Tokyo, Los Angeles. The Center manages the Go for Broke Monument and educates the public about the history of Japanese-American service in World War II.

In 2017, So helped develop the clothing company, Scrt Society, and released a capsule collection with them through his DavidSoComedy brand.

=== Food establishments ===
==== Drips and Swirls ====
So owns Drips & Swirls, a soft serve ice cream and coffee shop in Koreatown, Los Angeles. So started it with three other people and it opened to the public on August 25, 2016.

==== Junbi Matcha & Tea ====
June Quan, Dan Tran, Anna Wang, and Jeremy Tu cofounded Young Bud, a matcha-centric snack and dessert shop, in Smorgasburg LA in 2017. Joe Jitsukawa of JKFilms and So later came on as partners prior the business being rebranded as Sip Matcha in January 2018. A physical location opened in Westwood, Los Angeles in February 2018. And a second physical location opened in Rowland Heights, California in June 2018. The business was rebranded as Junbi Matcha & Tea in January 2020 due to copyright disputes over the name Sip Matcha.

== Personal life ==
So lives in Los Angeles, California. He announced his engagement to longtime partner, Mariel Song, in August 2019.

So's father is a pastor. He has an older brother.
