= Royal Upstairs Downstairs =

British TV documentary series

Royal Upstairs Downstairs is a British television documentary series of 20 half-hour episodes broadcast by BBC Two each Monday to Friday evening from 7 March to 1 April 2011. The title is a reference to the drama series Upstairs, Downstairs, which was about life "above stairs" (the family), and "below stairs" (the servants) in an early 20th-century aristocratic household.

In each episode, antiques expert Tim Wonnacott and chef Rosemary Shrager visited a country house or castle which had been visited in the 19th century by Queen Victoria. They told the story of Victoria's travels using her own diaries, other contemporary accounts, the household records of the stately homes, and contemporary illustrations, including many from the Illustrated London News, which provided extensive coverage of Victoria's travels, its reporters and artists even being allowed inside the houses where the queen was staying to describe and draw the interiors and entertainments. Wonnacott examined items of art and furniture seen and often commented on by Victoria. Shrager examined how the servants coped with the demands of a royal visit, and cooked Victorian dishes with the assistance of food historian Ivan Day. In most cases they used the same kitchen as the Victorian chefs who cooked for the queen, and many of the dishes demonstrated were known to have been served to Victoria in the house in question.

The series progressed through Victoria's life in chronological order, starting with her visit to Chatsworth House at the age of 13, where she attended her first grown up dinner party. The following eighteen episodes visited Shugborough Hall, Harewood House, Holkham Hall, the Brighton Pavilion, Scone Palace, Walmer Castle, Wimpole Hall, Belvoir Castle, Blair Castle, Burghley House, Hatfield House, Castle Howard, Stoneleigh Abbey, Warwick Castle, Penrhyn Castle, Floors Castle, Hughenden Manor, and Waddesdon Manor. The final episode was a compilation.
