= Jackie Tohn =

American actress and musician (born 1980)

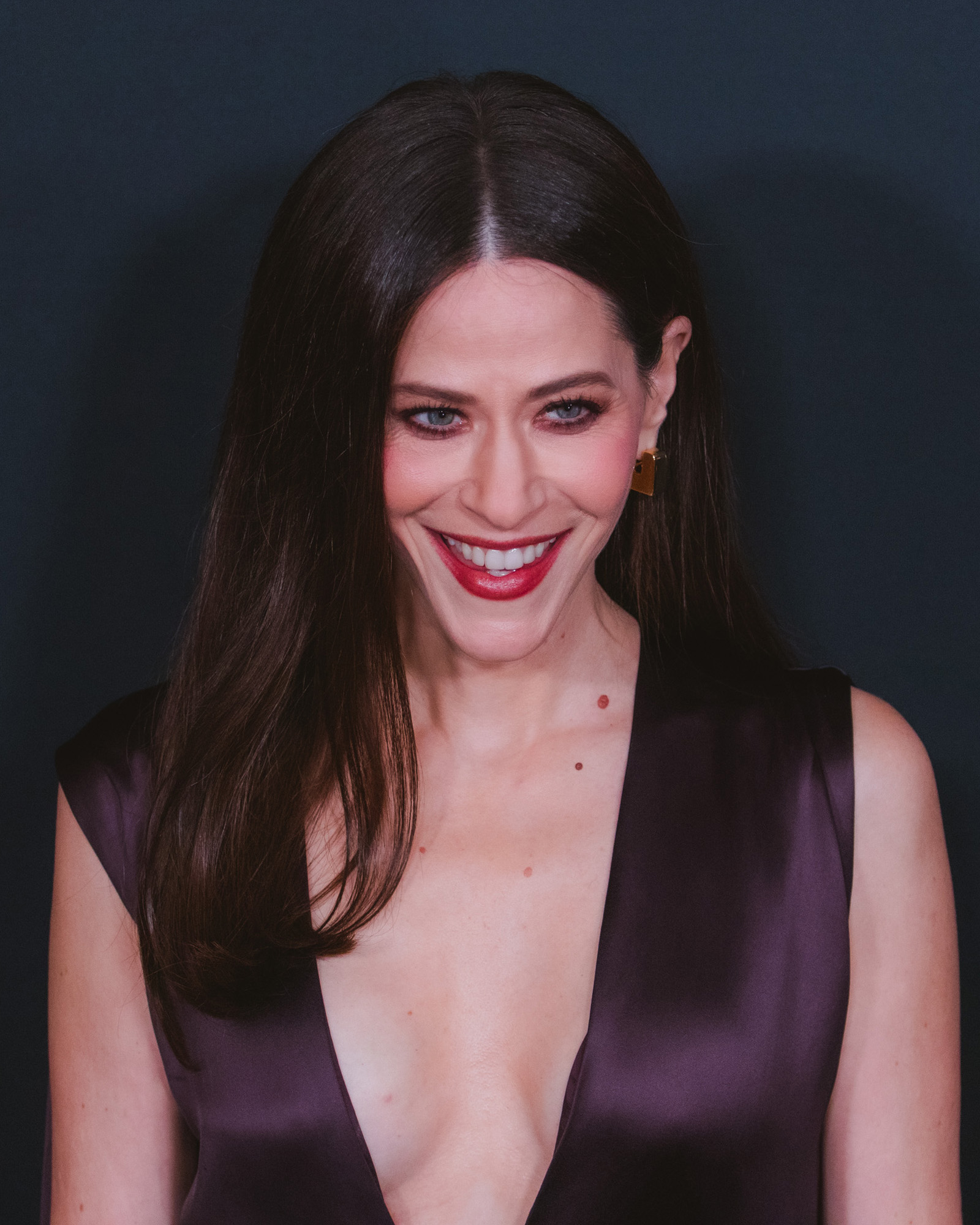
- Tohn in 2026

Background information
- Born: August 25, 1980 (age 46); Oceanside, New York, U.S.
- Genres: Pop; R&B; blues rock
- Occupations: Singer; actress
- Instruments: Vocals; guitar
- Years active: 1994–present
- Website: jackietohn.com

Jaclyn Tohn (born August 25, 1980) is an American actress and musician. She is best known for playing Melanie "MelRose" Rosen on the Netflix series GLOW and Courtenay Fortney in the Amazon Prime Video series The Boys and Gen V, and for taking part in American Idol season 8, making it to Top 36 (the Semi-finals). She also took part in the 2011 songwriting competition series Platinum Hit on the Bravo network. Tohn has played Esther in Netflix's Nobody Wants This since 2024.

== Early life ==
Tohn was born and raised in a Jewish family in Oceanside, Long Island, New York, to physical education teachers Alan and Bella Tohn. She has two older brothers.

Tohn began acting professionally while still a grade school student. She was a student at Boardman Middle School. After high school, she attended the University of Delaware and majored in elementary education, and in the fall of 1998 was in the a cappella group the Deltones.

In 1999, an 18-year-old Tohn came to Los Angeles with her agent and mother and moved in with actress Jessica Biel and her family in Calabasas, after meeting at the TV Guide Awards, to pursue her career.

== Career ==
Tohn's onscreen debut was at age ten, in an extra role on the PBS children's series Ghostwriter. Her first credited role was on the CBS sitcom The Nanny.

In November 1999, Tohn starred in the one-act play This Property Is Condemned by Tennessee Williams at the Chapel Street Theatre. She moved to Los Angeles with her mother and agent at the time. She played Tina in Tony-n-Tina's Wedding at the Henry Fonda Theatre in Los Angeles. She also originated the role of Joanie in Body Snatchers: The Musical at the Odyssey Theatre in Los Angeles.

In March 2004, she starred in the play Jewtopia at the Coast Playhouse in West Hollywood in Los Angeles. The producers then decided to move the play to the Westside Arts Theater in New York and she relocated.

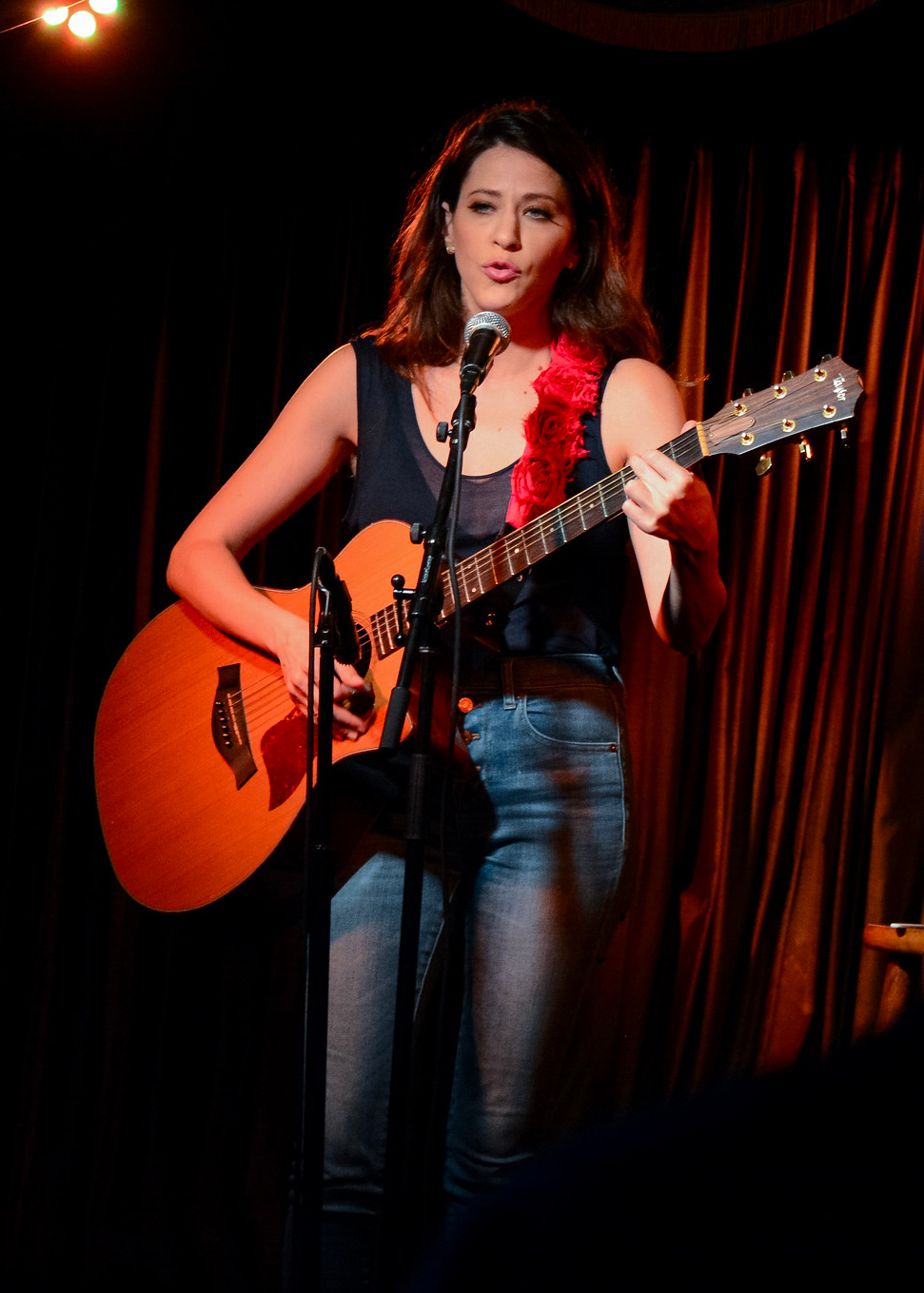
Tohn performing in 2018

She began performing solo acoustic guitar shows in April 2004. In November 2005, she released an EP, The Golden Girl, recorded at a studio in Tarrytown, New York. She has played at Pianos, The Living Room, CBGB, The Cutting Room, and The Rothko in New York and at Highland Grounds, The Mint, and Wizard Finger in Los Angeles.

She has appeared in the films Dawg in 2002 (also known as Bad Boy) alongside Denis Leary, Deuces Wild as Mary Ann, and Return to Sleepaway Camp as Linda. She appeared as Faith in the film Postal and appeared in the 2008 television film Giants of Radio.

Tohn performed in a pilot for MTV called Show Me the Movie and a pilot for Fox called Prudy and Judy, starring alongside Laura Bell Bundy. She has appeared in the television series The Sopranos, Strangers with Candy, Angel, Rules of Engagement, Veronica Mars and It's Always Sunny in Philadelphia.

In 2007, she appeared in the short films Smile, Discovering the Wheels, The Malibu Myth, The Legend of Donkey-Tail Willie and Catch (where she was shown playing the guitar) which were made during the reality show On the Lot.

In 2009, Tohn appeared on the eighth season of American Idol and made it through to the Hollywood rounds. She advanced through the Hollywood rounds, making the Top 36 for season 8 and was in the first group of 12 to perform. She performed "A Little Less Conversation" from Elvis Presley during Top 36 (Group 1) under the theme Billboard Hot 100 Hits to Date and was eliminated without advancing to the finals.

In 2011, she appeared on the songwriting-competition reality show Platinum Hit on the American cable network Bravo as one of 12 aspiring songwriters. She reached 7th place. In 2013, Tohn appeared on House of Lies.

In 2016, she was cast in the Netflix series GLOW.

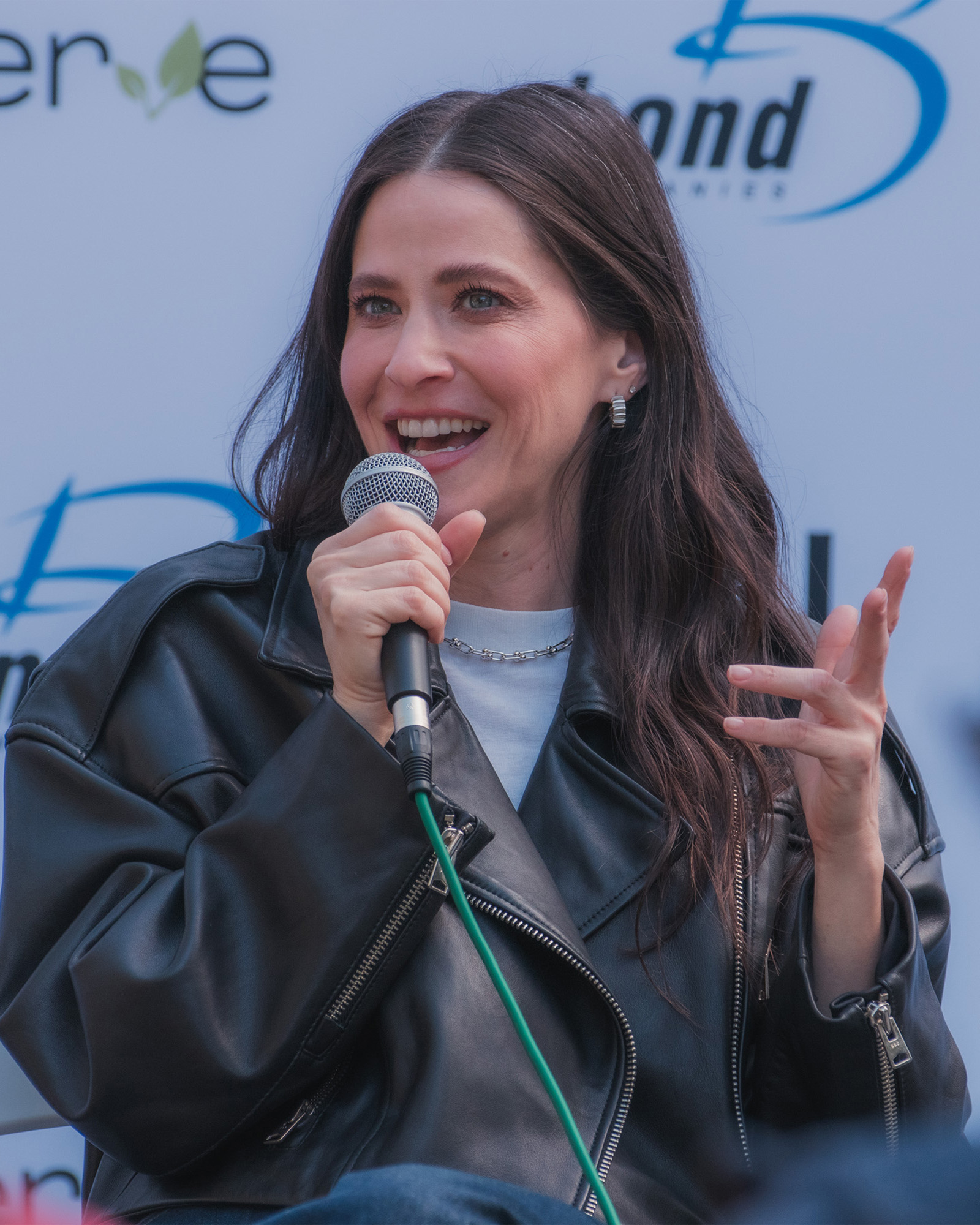
Tohn in 2025

In 2019, Tohn appeared in Epic Rap Battles of History portraying Joan Rivers in the episode "George Carlin vs Richard Pryor". In 2019, Tohn was the host of The Howard Stern Show Sternthology's week-long show of [Wack History Month]. The same year, Tohn debuted as Courtenay Fortney on The Boys, and later reprised the role on spinoff Gen V in 2023.

Tohn is a judge on the 2020 Netflix cooking competition show Best Leftovers Ever! alongside Rosemary Shrager and David So.

In 2021, Tohn co-created and starred in Do, Re & Mi, an animated series produced by Gaumont for Amazon Prime Video.

On January 15, 2025, Tohn competed on the Season 3 of Celebrity Jeopardy! She earned a place in the semifinals with a correct Final Jeopardy! response and smart wager from 3rd place. She defeated astrophysicist Neil deGrasse Tyson but lost in the semifinals to eventual winner W. Kamau Bell. Tohn's charity cause, PATH, supports global healthcare efforts.

== Personal life ==
In December 2025, Tohn underwent a preventative double mastectomy after testing positive for the BRCA1 gene, which placed her at an 85-percent risk of developing breast cancer. Tohn was prompted to undergo the genetic test after her father, who was diagnosed with metastatic carcinoma, tested positive for the gene.

== Filmography ==
=== Film ===
Year	Title	Role	Notes
2002	Dawg	Eric Koyle	
2002	Deuces Wild	Mary Ann	
2007	On the Lot	Jackie	Short film
2007	Postal	Faith	
2008	Giants of Radio	Jamie Moran	Television film
2008	Return to Sleepaway Camp	Linda O'Casey	Direct-to-video
2011	Monster of the House	Isabelle	Television film
2015	Jem and the Holograms	Rebecca	
2015	Bad Roomies	Jennifer	
2015	Sisters	DJ	
2016	Dad Friends	Jessica	Television film
2017	CHiPs	Amy Stephenson	
2018	A Futile and Stupid Gesture	Gilda Radner	
2018	Spell	Jess	
2023	Old Dads	Cara Brody	
2023	Step Aside	Marci	

=== Television ===
Year	Title	Role	Notes
1994, 1996	The Nanny	Tiffany Koenig, Francine	2 episodes
1999	The Sopranos	Heather Dante	Episode: "Boca"
1999	Cousin Skeeter	Cute Girl	Episode: "Bowled Over"
2000	Strangers with Candy	Heckler	Episode: "Trail of Tears"
2003	Angel	Woman No. 1	Episode: "Shiny Happy People"
2007	Veronica Mars	B.A.	Episode: "Show Me the Monkey"
2007	It's Always Sunny in Philadelphia	Asriel	Episode: "The Gang Finds a Dumpster Baby"
2008	The Closer	Kim Reynolds	Episode: "Split Ends"
2010	Memphis Beat	Delilah Boswell	Episode: "One Night of Sin"
2010	Laugh Track Mash-Up	Tammy	Episode: "Coopin' with Mr. Levy"
2010–2011	For a Green Card	Jackie	4 episodes
2011	CSI: NY	Ainsley McCrea	Episode: "To What End?"
2011	Zeke and Luther	Lady Lucy	Episode: "Skate Video Awards"
2012	Rules of Engagement	Andrea	Episode: "Goodbye Dolly"
2014	Castle	Cyber Rita	Episode: "Bad Santa"
2016	The Good Place	Alexis	2 episodes
2017–19	GLOW	Melanie Rosen	28 episodes
2018	Drop the Mic	Herself	Episode: "WWE Superstars vs. GLOW / Laila Ali vs. Chris Jericho"
2018	WWE SmackDown	Herself	Episode: "The Road to WWE Extreme Rules 2018 Begins"
2018–2024	25 Words or Less	Herself/Contestant	49 episodes
2019	Epic Rap Battles of History	Joan Rivers	Episode: "George Carlin vs Richard Pryor"
2019, 2026	The Boys	Courtenay Fortney	2 episodes
2020	Royalties	Polly Amorous	3 episodes
2020	Best Leftovers Ever!	Host	Main cast
2021	Do, Re & Mi	Re	Main cast; also executive producer
2023	Gen V	Courtenay Fortney	Episode: "#ThinkBrink"
2023	The Tiny Chef Show	Herself	Episode: "Fwendsgiving"
2024–present	Nobody Wants This	Esther Roklov	Main role (seasons 2, 3); Recurring role (season 1)
2024	NCIS	Celia Ross	Episode: "Empty Next"
2025	Celebrity Jeopardy!	Herself	Season 3, Episode 2 Quarterfinal
2025	Krapopolis	Megaera (voice)	Episode: "Plague and Fury"

== Discography ==
=== Studio albums ===
Year	Album details
2009	Beguiling: Released: March 20, 2009; Label: self-released
2010	2.Yo: Released: May 11, 2010; Label: self-released
