= Aussie Ladette to Lady =

Australian reality show

- Starring: Eggleston Hall teachers and ladettes
- Country of origin: Australia
- No. of seasons: 2
- No. of episodes: 13

Production
- Running time: 60 minutes

Original release
- Network: Nine Network
- Release: 16 February – 17 November 2009

Related
- Ladette to Lady

Aussie Ladette to Lady is an Australian reality-based television series, based on the format of the successful British series Ladette to Lady. The premise of the series sees eight Australian women sent to Eggleston Hall Finishing School in England (the same venue as the British series), where the staff will attempt to transform them into ladies. The series debuted in Australia on 16 February 2009 on the Nine Network.

A second season began on 20 October 2009.

== Episode guide – Series 1 (2009) ==
=== Episode 1 – The Arrival (Boot Camp) ===
As the finishing touches are made in preparation to welcome the class of '08 at Eggleston Hall, expectation soon turns to dread. The teachers fear the worst when news arrives that the police have been called to the local airport following complaints of disruptive behaviour and vandalism on board their inbound flight.

Hearing the raucous chant of "Aussie! Aussie! Aussie!" coming up the drive, their worst fears are confirmed. Vice-principal, Mrs Shrager, confronts the drunken rabble at the school's entrance and uses all her authority and volume to shout them down. The stage is set for an epic battle of wills.

The Aussie ladettes are stripped down to their ill-fitting undies and it's soon all too obvious that these are tattooed recruits of the rawest kind. Dispensing with niceties, the staff get to work and, as lessons begin in earnest, it soon becomes clear that the ladettes are up against formidable opposition.

Before long rebellion gives way to something approaching cooperation and the painful process of change begins. By week's end they will host a cocktail party and entertain some of England's most eligible bachelors, which included young etiquette expert William Hanson. At the end of Episode One, ladette Maria was expelled.

=== Episode 2 – The Hunt (The Thrill of the Chase) ===
With one disgraced ladette already on her way home, week two sees a chastened band of Aussie ladettes face up to a daunting challenge. They must play host to the prestigious Zetland Hunt. But it's not all sausage rolls and stirrup cups.

First the girls must literally face a test of guts, and acclimatise to the unsavoury realities of country life. Picking shotgun pellets from pheasants is one thing, but feeding "fallen stock" to the foxhounds is quite another.

Emotions are stirred when the ladettes challenge some local lasses to a midnight steeple chase. Success goes to Nicole's head and she treats everyone to a strip tease.

Sarah triumphs when chosen to ride out with the hunt, but blots her copybook, and brings the school into disgrace, when she unfurls an Aussie pennant at full tilt. Sarah's act of rebellion brings her before the principal, and it seems she is destined for expulsion. But a dramatic change of heart radically alters the picture and, as expulsion day approaches, the field is wide open. At the end of Episode Two, ladette Emily was expelled.

=== Episode 3 – Swimming with Sharks ===
If the Aussie ladettes thought being transformed into demure young ladies would be a walk in the park, this is the week they learn how wrong they were. "We take them and we break them," says finishing school principal, Ms Harbord.

In week three, the "tough love" treatment produces some unexpected results. There are tears as the ladettes' emotional defences give way to storms of emotion. But the tables are turned when stripper Nicole tells the story of her troubled past and even stern Mrs. Harbord sheds a tear.

But emotion must be put aside as the ladettes face their weekly challenge: to make and serve afternoon tea to the aristocratic mothers of some of the bachelors. There's much work to be done before the ladettes have a hope of passing muster under the critical eyes of these society ladies (and prospective mother-in-laws).

Girl turns on girl in this episode of the series which sees an old-fashioned English finishing school struggling to turn Australia's worst binge-drinking "ladettes" into ladies. At the end of Episode Three, ladette Bianca was expelled.

=== Episode 4 – The Dinner Party ===
This week they must cook haute cuisine for 20 society guests. But, when Skye is promoted to school prefect, cooking is the last thing on their minds. Furious that this honour has been given to the bad girl of the group, the others decide to make Skye's life hell.

At the pre-dinner wine tasting all decorum flies out of the window and the old habits return. The ladettes do not taste, they guzzle and, to add insult to injury, they steal more bottles of wine for a secret binge, right under Skye's nose. Former mistress of mayhem, Skye, does her best to cover for their appalling behaviour, but principal Ms Harbord is not taken in.

With a punishment to contend with on the morning of the party, the dinner for 20 looks set for disaster. The guests are perplexed and more than a little hungry when dinner is served an hour and a half late. But in spite of the pressures one ladette raises her game by embarking on a mission to stay sober throughout. At the end of episode 4, ladette Zoe was expelled.

=== Episode 5 – A Royal Visitor ===
Eggleston Hall Finishing School is preparing to entertain royalty for the first time in its history, and the teachers want their girls to make a good impression on the visiting prince – a dashing Italian from Venice.

There's no margin for error when, after last week's appalling lapse in standards, Ms Harbord announces a zero-tolerance policy on bad behaviour. But, when the four surviving ladettes are forced to wear a body harness to improve their deportment, one of them decides that enough is enough. Tough mine-worker, Sarah has fought hard to earn her place as an equal in a man's world, and she's not about to curtsey to anyone – not even a prince.

The show must go on, and the girls have just days to prepare for a wildly ambitious event – a masked ball in honour of their royal visitor. And, as if that weren't enough, the girls must also contend with some amorous bachelors who will be staying over the night of the ball. Whether it's the prospect of a genuine Italian prince or of the return of the now familiar bachelors, the sausage-making lesson provokes a very unladylike response in the girls. At the end of episode 5, ladette Sarah was expelled.

=== Episode 6 – Coming of Age ===
Three girls have survived to the final week and have reached the climax of their journey – the graduation ball. But there's no time to relax. There can be only one winner and the girls will come under greater scrutiny than ever. The remaining contestants will have their parents flown to England to join them for the graduation ball.

Now the girls must put into practise everything they have learned – from constructing a towering cake, to tying a presentation bouquet of fresh flowers, and sewing the final touches to their graduation ball gowns. Finishing school principal, Ms Harbord, tells them that if they do not qualify, they'll be flying home to Australia ahead of time. But if they do, their parents will be flying to England to join them.

The awards ceremony is to be hosted at one of Britain's finest country houses where the girls are expected to parade their newfound looks, elegance and good manners. Throughout, they will be judged under the exacting standards of the teachers and by others from the ranks of high society. And they will face their toughest challenge yet – to write and deliver a speech about their journey from ladette to lady.

You can cut the atmosphere with a knife as the teachers retire to decide which one is this year's winner, and when Sarah makes a surprise appearance to wish all three of her fellow ladettes the very best of luck, there is relief and genuine joy. After all the deliberations, the trials and tribulations, Ms Harbord finally emerges to announce that this year's winner is Nicole and there is not a dry eye left in the house.

=== Episode 7 – Reunion ===
In the season final catch up with the girls back in their home environments where they're surprised by a visit from the Headmistress Gill Harbord and cooking teacher Rosemary Shrager.

== Season 1 contestants ==
=== Winner ===
- Nicole Mitchell, (21) from Sydney

=== Ladies ===
- Skye Harper (21) from Brisbane
- Kristyn Gohrt (21) from Western Australia

=== Expelled Ladettes ===
- Maria De Corrado (23) from Melbourne
- Emily Ramshaw (19) from Melbourne
- Bianca Stevens (23) from New South Wales
- Zoe Irons (19) from Adelaide
- Sarah Brunton (29) from New South Wales

== Season 2 contestants ==
=== Winner ===
- Donnelle Goemans (23) from Western Australia

=== Ladies ===
- Jessica Shaw-Walford (19) from Melbourne
- Shari Linney (21) from Perth

=== Expelled Ladettes ===
- Letisha Hapimana (21) from Brisbane
- Samantha McLeod (23) from Queensland
- Kerryn Armstrong (24) from Queensland
- Kelly Johnson (21) from Victoria
- Kaila Edwards (18) from New South Wales
