= Eggleston Hall =

C19 English country house in County Durham

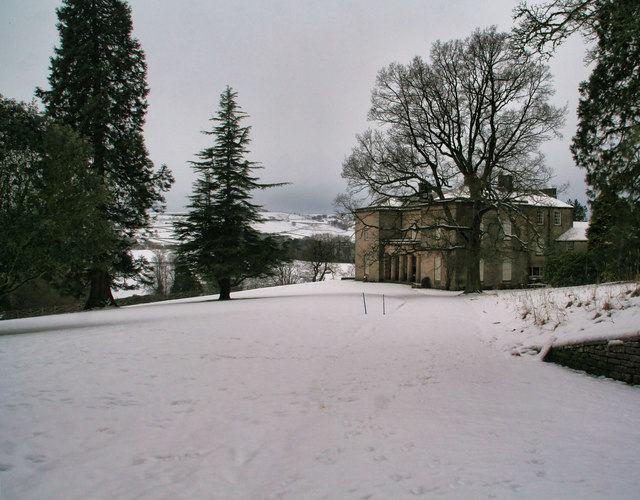

- Location in County Durham

General information
- Location: County Durham, England
- Coordinates: 54.606°N 2.007°W
- OS grid: NY996234

Eggleston Hall is a privately owned 19th-century English country house in Eggleston, Teesdale, County Durham. It is a Grade II* listed building.

== Overview ==
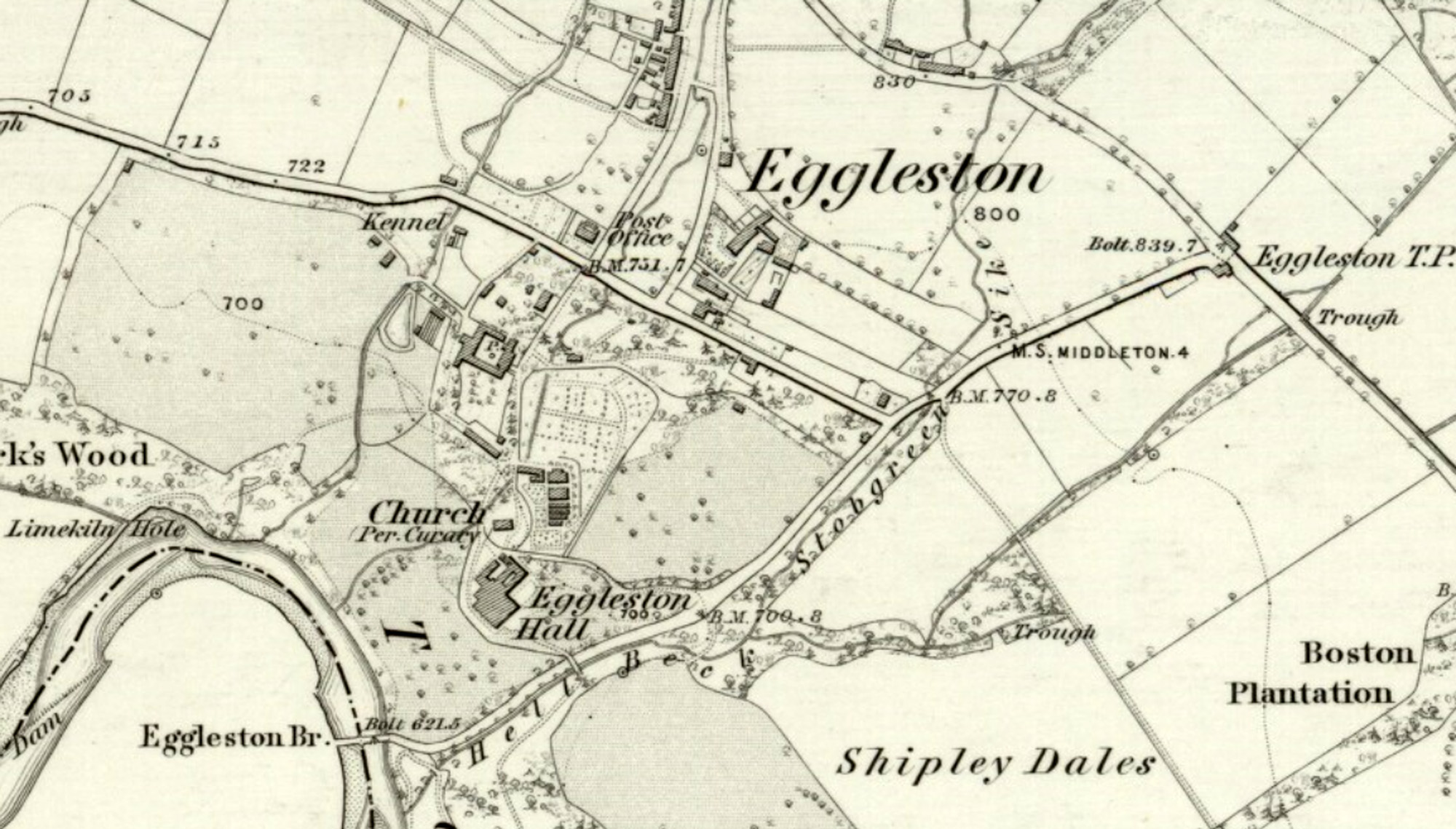
Map of Eggleston in 1855

The manor of Eggleston was forfeited to the Crown by Charles Neville, 6th Earl of Westmorland as a consequence of his part in the Rising of the North in 1569. It was granted by the Crown to the City of London and thereafter passed through several hands until it was acquired by the Hutchinson family early in the 18th century.

The house was built in 1817 on the site of the old manor house. It was commissioned by William Hutchinson to a design by architect Ignatius Bonomi. The two-storey house has a recessed two-bayed central block flanked by projecting end bays connected by a Doric order colonnade.

In 1919 the house was acquired by Sir William Cresswell Gray, 1st Baronet, of the shipbuilding firm William Gray & Company. From 1972 to 1991 it was run as a finishing school by Rosemarie Gray, the widow of William Talbot Gray (High Sheriff of Durham in 1971), the son of Sir William Gray Bt., but has been returned to residential use. It is, in 2008, the family seat of Sir William Hume Gray, 3rd Baronet.

== The Hutchinson family ==
William Hutchinson (1763-1826) built Eggleston Hall in about 1817. He was the son of Timothy Hutchinson (1732-1810) who owned the Manor of Eggleston and an existing house on the same site as the present Hall. This previous house was described in 1779 as being white with turrets. When Timothy died in 1810 William inherited the property.

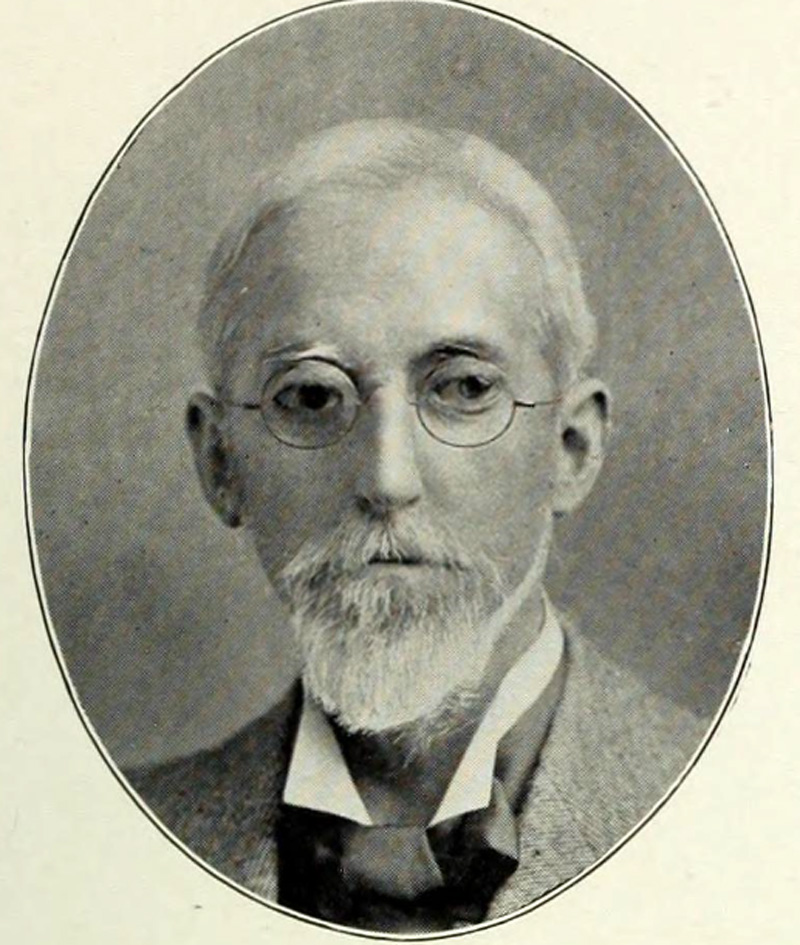
Cecil William Hutchinson (1844-1917)

William married in 1789 Mary Byam (1772-1826) who was the daughter of the wealthy landowner Martin Byam of Antigua. They had no children so when William died in 1826 his younger brother George Peter Hutchinson (1767-1833) inherited the Hall.

George obtained a B. A from the University of Cambridge. In 1788 he entered the Queens Own Dragoons and rose rapidly through the ranks to become a Major. In 1815 he married Elizabeth Grubb. When he died in 1833 the Hall was inherited by his eldest son William Hutchinson (1816 -1842). He died in 1842 at the age of only 26 and the property was passed to his younger brother Timothy Hutchinson (1818-1904).

Timothy lived at Eggleston Hall for the next 62 years. He was born in 1818 and in 1842 married Elizabeth Sophia Wilkinson, the daughter of John Wilkinson of Welton Grange. The couple had four sons and two daughters. The 1881 Census shows Timothy and Elizabeth living at the Hall with some of their children and a butler, a housekeeper, two footmen, a ladies maid, an upper house maid, two house maids, a kitchen maid, two laundry maids and a scullery maid.

When Timothy died in 1904 his eldest son Cecil William Hutchinson (1844-1917) inherited the Hall. In 1874 he married Clara Henrietta Frank and the couple had two sons and one daughter. His eldest son Captain William Regis Claude Hutchinson (1875-1961) became the owner of the property in 1917 when Cecil died. In 1919 he advertised the whole 10,000 acres for sale. The advertisement is shown at this reference. The Hall was bought by Sir William Creswell Gray for his son William returning safely from World War I. He was a Captain in the 3rd Battalion, Yorkshire Regiment and was mentioned in despatches. He was wounded and became a POW so his return was a joyous occasion. The Hall is still owned by the Gray family today.

== Filming ==
The house is not generally open to the public but is available for social and corporate functions by arrangement. The walled gardens and a café / gift shop in the former coach house are open to the public. The ITV series Ladette to Lady used the house as their girls' finishing school.
