= Ladette to Lady =

British reality show

- Genre: Reality
- Narrated by: Lucy Briers (2005–08); Ben Gooder (2009–10)
- Country of origin: United Kingdom
- Original language: English
- No. of series: 5
- No. of episodes: 27

Production
- Production locations: Eggleston Hall (series 1 to 4); Hereford Hall (series 5)
- Production company: RDF Television

Original release
- Network: ITV
- Release: 2 June 2005 – 6 August 2010

Related
- Aussie Ladette to Lady

Ladette to Lady is a reality-based series that aired in the United Kingdom on ITV between June 2005 and August 2010.

== Overview ==
The second series of Ladette to Lady was aired in the United Kingdom in October 2006 on ITV. The show had viewing figures of 4.45 million to 5.41 million, winning its timeslot each week. A third series followed in 2008, although it was originally planned to air in 2007.

Ladette to Lady was cancelled by ITV on 11 April 2008, but returned in June 2009, featuring Australian, rather than British, ladettes. The series featured the original staff and school.

Ladette to Lady returned on ITV for Series 5 on 20 July 2010. The series saw the return of the familiar staff. However, instead of Eggleston Hall, where all the other series have been featured, this series is based in Hereford Hall.

The series has been parodied on The Charlotte Church Show as Lady to Ladette, in which, conversely, prim and proper girls are taught by Church and some of her raucous friends to behave in a more "lady-like" manner.

== Premise ==
The series follows a group of ladettes, who are given an old-fashioned five-week course in learning how to behave like a traditional "lady". They are sent to Eggleston Hall, a finishing school for women in Teesdale, which was specially reopened for the show. In the first series, there were ten ladettes, while the second series featured eight ladettes.

Whilst on the premises they are required to wear the school's uniform: a turquoise tweed suit, a white blouse, court shoes, and a pearl necklace. This uniform has varied. They are taught under the supervision and guidance of five instructors and are given various tasks in deportment, elocution, flower arranging, etiquette and cookery. Other skills include needlework, ballroom dancing, riding side-saddle, drawing, and so on. However, if they can't live up to the standards of ladylike behaviour, they will be expelled. One participant is expelled at the end of each episode, so by the end of the programme there will only be three left. Then the teachers must decide upon one winner, depending on who they think has improved the most and how they performed in the final challenge. However, all three finalists receive an Eggleston Hall diploma.

== Teachers ==
The teachers at Eggleston Hall run a very strict routine and are extremely well experienced in their particular subjects. The teachers who taught the ladettes at Eggleston Hall were:

- Gill Harbord - Principal series 2-5, floristry teacher
- Elizabeth Brewer - Etiquette and social protocol teacher
- Kate Forester - Elocution teacher series 1-2, 4-5
- Rosemary Shrager - Vice Principal and cookery teacher
- Vanessa Hooper - Dance teacher
- Lady Elizabeth Devenport - Deportment teacher series 4-5

=== Former ===
- Jean Broke-Smith - Principal for Series 1
- Caroline Sherwood Roberts - Elocution Series 3
- Rachel Holland - Deportment Series 3

== Series One (2005) ==
=== Final challenge ===
For the ladettes' final challenge, they had to hold a fashion show. At the fashion show were their family, friends, eligible bachelors, the failed contestants, and the teachers from Eggleston Hall. The girls were marked on posture, grooming, elocution, floristry and cookery. The girl who was judged as the most improved would win a sports car with a value of £20,000, however, the fact that the winner would receive a car was unknown to the finalists. The eventual winner of Ladette to Lady 2005 and the sports car was Hayley Brisland from London.

=== Contestants ===
- Hayley Brisland (Winner)
- Michelle King (Runner-up)
- Rachael Carter-Eagleton (Third)
- Clare Randall
- Jessica Upton
- April Duncan
- Sarah Jane Gregory
- Sarah Newman
- Jemma Gunning
- Sarita Bhardwaj

== Series Two (2006) ==
=== Final challenge ===
The ladettes' final challenge was to pass themselves off as real ladies at a debutante ball. The Debutantes' Ball was attended by a number of eligible bachelors, Lords, Ladies, select aristocrats and all of the teachers from Eggleston Hall. They were marked on their posture, grooming, elocution, confidence and their capability to hold a conversation. The overall winner of Ladette to Lady 2006 was Victoria Jenkins, who impressed the teachers with her charm and final transformation. A close runner-up was Clara Mayer who later became a chalet girl.

=== Contestants ===
- Victoria Jenkins (Winner)
- Clara Mayer (Runner-up)
- Frances Rowe (Third)
- Laura Hearsum
- Louise Porter
- Rebecca Squire
- Angela Mott
- Emma Phillips-Martin

=== End of Term Report ===
Several months after series two of Ladette to Lady, all of the ladettes from both series one and series two were invited back to Eggleston Hall, along with teachers Gill Harbord, Rosemary Shrager and Liz Brewer, in order to see how the ladettes had changed and how they had progressed in their lives.

During the End of Term Report, Clare Randall, who during series one was a heavy drinker, revealed that she had had a baby, reformed her life, and quit drinking alcohol altogether. Michelle King from series one, as a result of the teachings of Eggleston Hall, was able to progress further in her life with more confidence. However, there were those who had not improved; to the surprise of the teachers, the winner of series two, Victoria Jenkins, still had her old job and had not progressed with her studies.

== Series Three (2008) ==
The ladettes' final challenge was to be presented as debutantes to their parents, to give a speech and to dance the waltz. They were required to answer questions from select aristocrats.

The overall winner of Ladette to Lady 2008 was Nicole Elouise Hart, who reacquired her love of horses. All the contestants were given lessons in riding side-saddle; she excelled at this and was offered the opportunity to compete after the conclusion of the series. She later went to Cairns to promote the Australian series and was used in the introduction shots.

Also notable was the reintroduction of Series Two contestant Louise Porter, who in the interim had begun a career as a glamour model.

=== Contestants ===
- Nicole Elouise Hart (Winner)
- Holly Clements (Runner up)
- Louise Porter (Runner up) (she was also in the second series)
- Simone Webber
- Neema Mattaker
- Kelly Simpson
- Amber Jaques
- Laura Waude
- Charlotte Donohue

== Series Four (2009) (a.k.a. Aussie Ladette to Lady) ==
=== Contestants ===
- Nicole Mitchell, (21) from Sydney (Winner)
- Skye Harper, (21) from Brisbane (Runner-up)
- Kristyn Gohrt, (21) from Western Australia (Runner-up)
- Sarah Brunton, (29) from New South Wales
- Zoe Irons, (19) from Adelaide
- Bianca Stevens, (23) from New South Wales
- Emily Biggs, (19) from Victoria
- Maria De Corrado, (23) from Melbourne

=== Series Reunion ===
In the final episode the principal and vice principal travelled to Australia to catch up with five of the participants three months after the graduation. Zoe had started volunteering at an animal centre in Adelaide and had sorted out her alcohol problem, Sarah got a new job, and Nicole quit her old job and was about to start a horticultural course, but Kristyn and Skye had not seemed to change.

=== Controversy ===
Series Four brought with it controversy in several members of the support cast quitting filming or being fired. Reports in The Daily Telegraph's Mandrake gossip column stated that Charles Lush, a self-styled baron, who appeared as the school governor, was asked by RDF Media, the production company, to quit filming after they found his name on a list of British National Party members during filming for the series.

William Hanson, etiquette expert, also quit filming after only one day, stating that the programme was 'detrimental to promoting good manners and etiquette' and that the so-called bachelors were just as bad as the girls with a few of them already married.

== Series Five (2010) (a.k.a. Aussie Ladette to Lady) ==
Series Five premiered on 20 July 2010 on ITV (except STV, where it premiered on 17 August 2010). Like Series Four, this series again features ladettes from Australia. The setting was moved from Eggleston Hall in North East England to "Hereford Hall" near Wales. Hereford Hall was a country house hired specifically for the show and not a functioning school, although that is how it was presented in the show.

=== Contestants ===
- Donnelle Goemans, (23) from Western Australia (Winner)
- Shari Linney, (21) from Perth (Runner-up)
- Jessica Shaw-Walford, (19) from Melbourne (Runner-up)
- Kaila Edwards, (18) from New South Wales
- Kelly Johnson, (21) from Victoria
- Kerryn Armstrong, (24) from Queensland
- Samantha McLeod, (23) from Queensland
- Letisha Hapimana, (21) from Brisbane

== Transmissions ==
Series	Start date	End date	Episodes
One	2 June 2005	30 June 2005	5
Two	28 September 2006	26 October 2006	5
Three	22 January 2008	26 February 2008	5
Four	2 June 2009	7 July 2009	6
Five	2 July 2010	6 August 2010	6

- Series 5 was aired 17 August 2010 – 21 September 2010 in STV region

== International broadcast ==
The series has also been broadcast in the United States on the Sundance Channel, in Australia on both The LifeStyle Channel and the Nine Network (Series 2 and 3, after Series 3 finished showing on the Nine Network, it aired one episode of Bad Lads Army the following week before cancelling it and showing Season 1 of Ladette to Lady) as well as the ABC (Series 1), New Zealand on Prime, Sweden on Kanal 5, Poland on TVN, Denmark on TV2 Zulu, Israel on Channel 8, the Netherlands on RTL 5, Canada on Cosmopolitan TV, Estonia on Kanal 11 and Kanal 2, Belgium on Vitaya and Norway on NRK1 and NRK3.

== International versions of the series ==
The Ladette to Lady format has been adapted for other national versions around the world.

Currently in production
Currently not in production

Country	Name of series	Network	Seasons & winners	Number of episodes
Australia	Aussie Ladette to Lady	Nine Network; ITV (season 2)	Season 1 (2009): Nicole Mitchell; Season 2 (2009): Donnelle Goemans	13
Netherlands	Dames in de Dop	RTL 5	Season 1 (2007): Anna Jonckers; Season 2 (2008): Michella Koxs; Season 3 (2011): Meron van der Schaar	62
Poland	Projekt Lady	TVN	Season 1 (2016): Patrycja Wieja; Season 2 (2017): Roksana Gac; Season 3 (2018): Magdalena Lubacz; Season 4 (2019): Liubov Miruk; Season 5 (2020): Dagmara Czerwińska; Season 6 (2021): Agata Łabuda	69
Russia	Patsanki	Friday!	Season 1 (2016): Yulia Kovaleva; Season 2 (2017): Tatiana Buraya; Season 3 (2018): Anna Gorokhova; Season 4 (2019): Diana Chragyan; Season 5 (2020): Anastasia Petrova; Season 6 (2021): Tatiana Kashirina	105
Russia	New Patsanki	Friday!	Season 1 (2022): Kira Medvedeva; Season 2 (2023): Svetlana Tokarova	34
Ukraine	Vid patsanki do panyanki	1+1	Season 1 (2010): Yulia Balayeva; Season 2 (2011): Lydia Yunasheva	22
Ukraine	Vid patsanki do panyanki	Novyi Kanal	Season 1 (2016): Galina Poludnevich; Season 2 (2017): Anna Savinets; Season 3 (2018): Yana Kovalska; Season 4 (2020): Yevhenia Mazur; Season 5 (2021): Valeriya Tkachenko	69
Ukraine	Patsanki Nove Zhittya	Novyi Kanal	Season 1 (2017): Irina Slyunko; Season 2 (2018): Galina Poludnevich	48

== See also ==
- The Girls of Hedsor Hall
- From G's to Gents
