= Hatfield House =

Country house in Hatfield, Hertfordshire, England

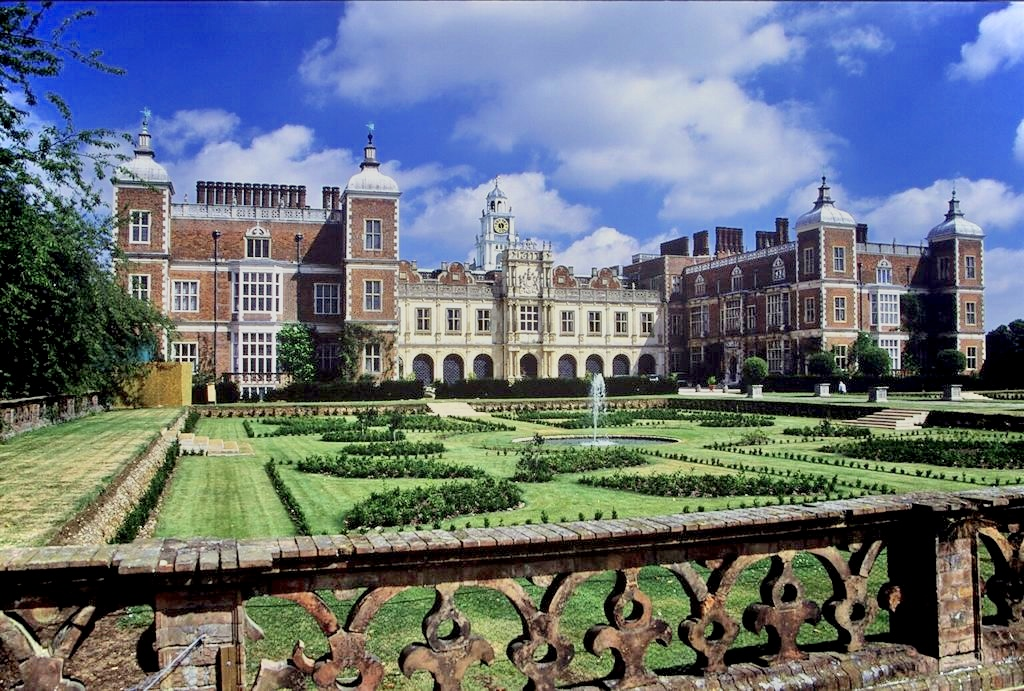
- South-facing view of Hatfield House

- Location within Hertfordshire
- 51°45′38″N 0°12′33″W
- Type: Prodigy house
- Location: Hatfield, Hertfordshire
- OS grid reference: TL 23715 08394

History
- Built: 1607-1612

Site notes
- Architectural style: Jacobean
- Owner: Robert Gascoyne-Cecil

Listed Building – Grade I
- Official name: Hatfield House
- Designated: 6 February 1952
- Reference no.: 1173363

National Register of Historic Parks and Gardens
- Official name: Hatfield House
- Designated: 11 June 1987
- Reference no.: 1000343

The Old Palace, Hatfield House
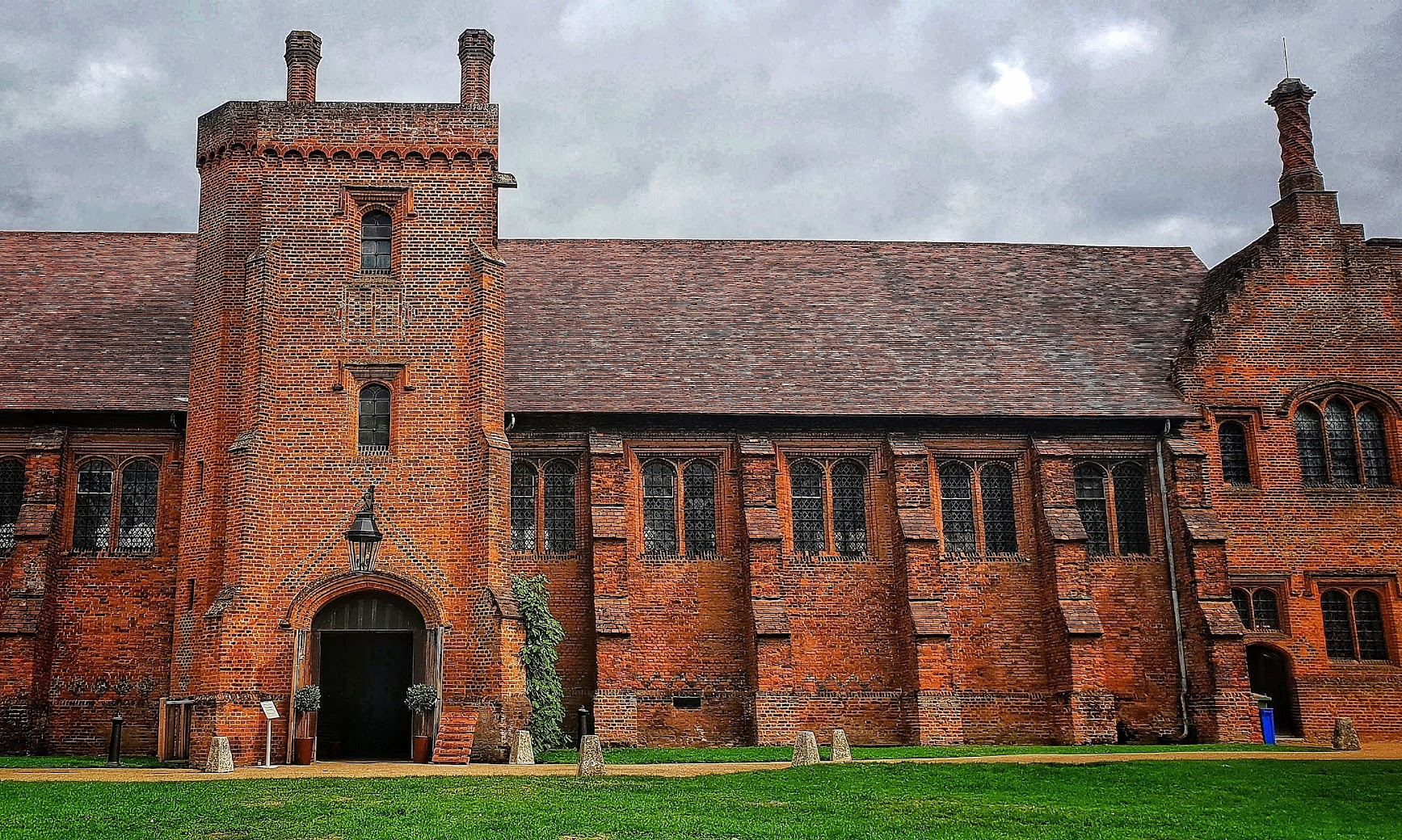
- The Old Palace, Hatfield House

- Location within Hertfordshire
- 51°45′40″N 0°12′39″W
- Type: Bishop's Palace
- Location: Hatfield

History
- Built: c.1480

Site notes
- Area: Hertfordshire
- Architectural styles: Medieval and Tudor

Listed Building – Grade I
- Official name: The Palace
- Designated: 6 February 1952
- Reference no.: 1348152

Hatfield House is a Grade I listed country house set in a large park, the Great Park, on the eastern side of Hatfield, Hertfordshire, England.

The present Jacobean house, a leading example of the prodigy house, was built in 1611 by Robert Cecil, 1st Earl of Salisbury and Chief Minister to James I. It is a prime example of Jacobean architecture. The estate includes extensive grounds and surviving parts of an earlier palace. Queen Elizabeth's Oak is said to be the place where Elizabeth I was informed she had become queen. The house is currently the home of Robert Gascoyne-Cecil, 7th Marquess of Salisbury. It is open to the public.

== History ==
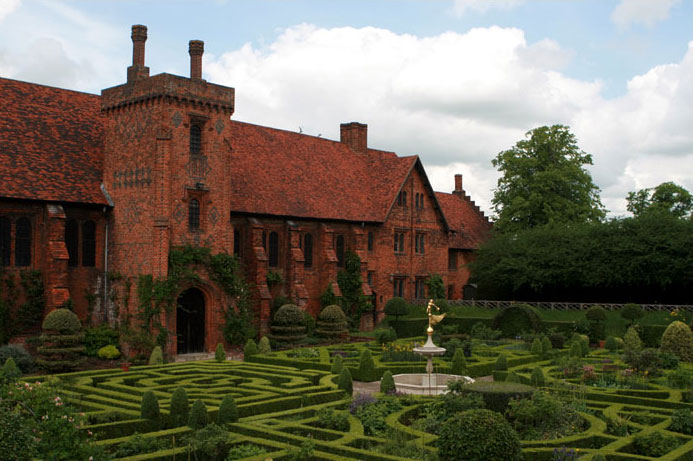
Hatfield House Old Palace

An earlier building on the site was the Royal Palace of Hatfield. Only part of this still exists, a short distance from the present house. That palace was the childhood home and favourite residence of Queen Elizabeth I. Built in 1497 by Cardinal John Morton, Archbishop of Canterbury, Henry VII's minister, it comprised four wings in a square surrounding a central courtyard. The palace was seized by Henry VIII with other church properties. The nearby parish church of St Etheldreda's in Old Hatfield once served the bishop's palace as well as the village. Henry VIII's children, Edward VI and the future Elizabeth I, spent their youth at Hatfield Palace. His eldest daughter, Mary, lived there between 1533 and 1536, when she was sent to wait on the then Princess Elizabeth as punishment for refusing to recognise Henry's marriage to Anne Boleyn and his religious reforms.

In 1548, when she was only 15 years old, Elizabeth was under suspicion of having illegally agreed to marry Thomas Seymour. The house and her servants were seized by Edward VI's agent, Robert Tyrwhit, and she was interrogated there. She successfully defended her conduct with wit and defiance. Seymour was executed in 1549 for numerous other crimes against the crown. After her two months of imprisonment in the Tower of London by her sister, Queen Mary, Elizabeth returned to Hatfield. The Queen Elizabeth Oak on the grounds of the estate is said to be the location where Elizabeth was told she was queen following Mary's death, but is considered unlikely as Mary died in November. In November 1558, Elizabeth held her first Council of State in the Great Hall.

Hatfield House is a popular tourist attraction because it has so many objects associated with Queen Elizabeth I, including gloves and a pair of silk stockings that are believed to have been the first in England. The library displays a 22-foot (6.7 m) long illuminated parchment roll showing the pedigree of the queen with ancestors back to Adam and Eve. The Marble Hall holds the "Rainbow Portrait" of Elizabeth.

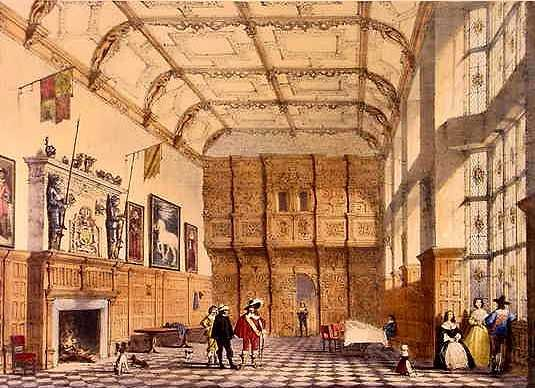
The great hall

Elizabeth's successor, King James I, did not like the palace. It was included in the jointure estate of his wife Anne of Denmark. In 1607, King James gave it to his chief minister, Robert Cecil, 1st Earl of Salisbury, in exchange for Theobalds, which was the Cecils' family home on the current site of Cedars Park, Broxbourne. Cecil, who liked building, tore down three wings of the royal palace (the back and sides of the square) in 1608 and used the bricks to build the present structure. The richly carved wooden Grand Staircase and the rare stained glass window in the private chapel are among the house's original Jacobean features. Cecil employed Robert Lemynge to supervise the construction, with input from the royal surveyor Simon Basil, and Inigo Jones who visited in October 1609.

During World War II, Hatfield House was the location of the first Civil Resettlement Unit and acted as headquarters for the scheme. CRUs were created to help repatriated British prisoners of war transition back to civilian life and the luxurious setting of Hatfield was considered very beneficial to these men. On 12 July 1945, the king and queen visited the CRU at Hatfield, which generated significant news coverage.

== Gardens ==
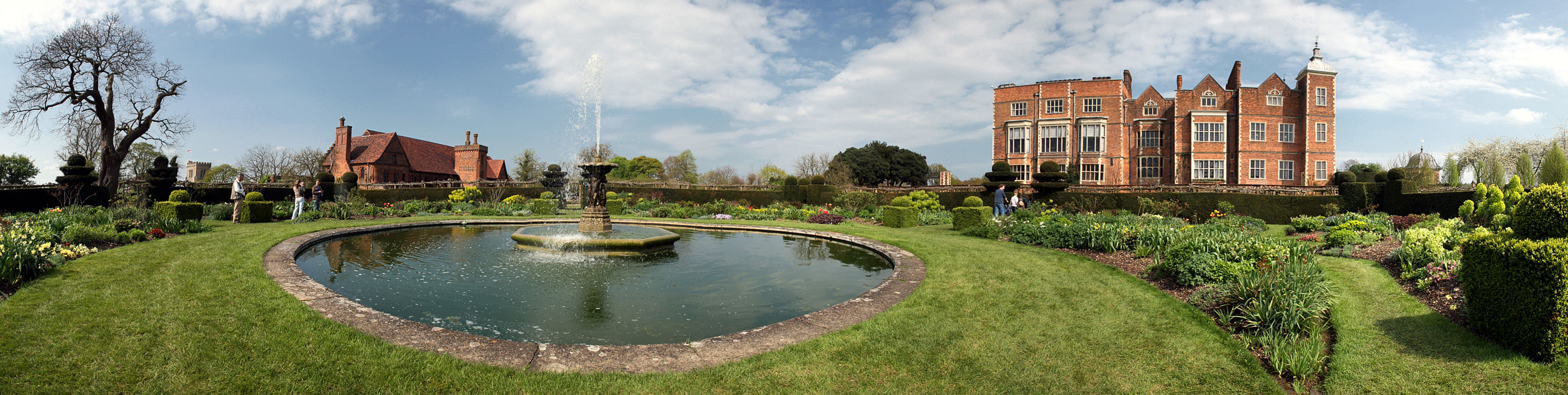
The West garden includes a scented garden and herb or kitchen garden

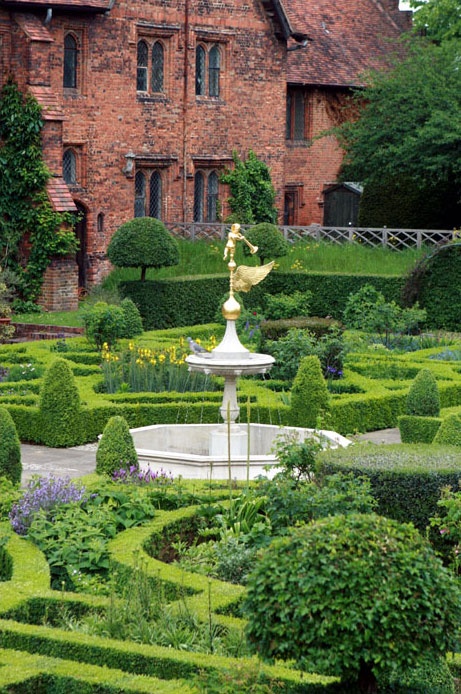
Hatfield House Gardens

The gardens, covering 42 acres (170,000 m^{2}), date from the early 17th century and were laid out by John Tradescant the elder. Tradescant visited Europe and brought back trees and plants that had never previously been grown in England. The gardens included orchards, fountains, scented plants, water parterres, terraces, herb gardens and a foot maze. They were neglected in the 18th century, but restoration began in Victorian times and continues under the present Dowager Marchioness of Salisbury.

During World War I, the grounds were used to test the first British tanks. An area was dug with trenches and craters and covered with barbed-wire to represent no man's land and German trench lines on the Western Front. To commemorate this, the only surviving Mark I tank was sited at Hatfield from 1919 to 1970 before being moved to The Tank Museum, Bovington.

The Rhodesian Light Infantry Regimental Association has placed its 'Troopie' memorial statue on the grounds of Hatfield House due to the long association of the Cecil family with Southern Rhodesia. Around its base is a roll of regimental members ('troopies') who fell in the Rhodesian Bush War and several inscriptions, including 'In reconciliation and hope for future peace in Zimbabwe'.

== Tours ==
The State Rooms can be seen in the midweek guided tours and visitors can look around in their own time at weekends. On Friday, the Garden Connoisseur's Day, the house is open for guided tours and pre-booked specialist groups. There are five miles of marked trails.

== Gallery ==
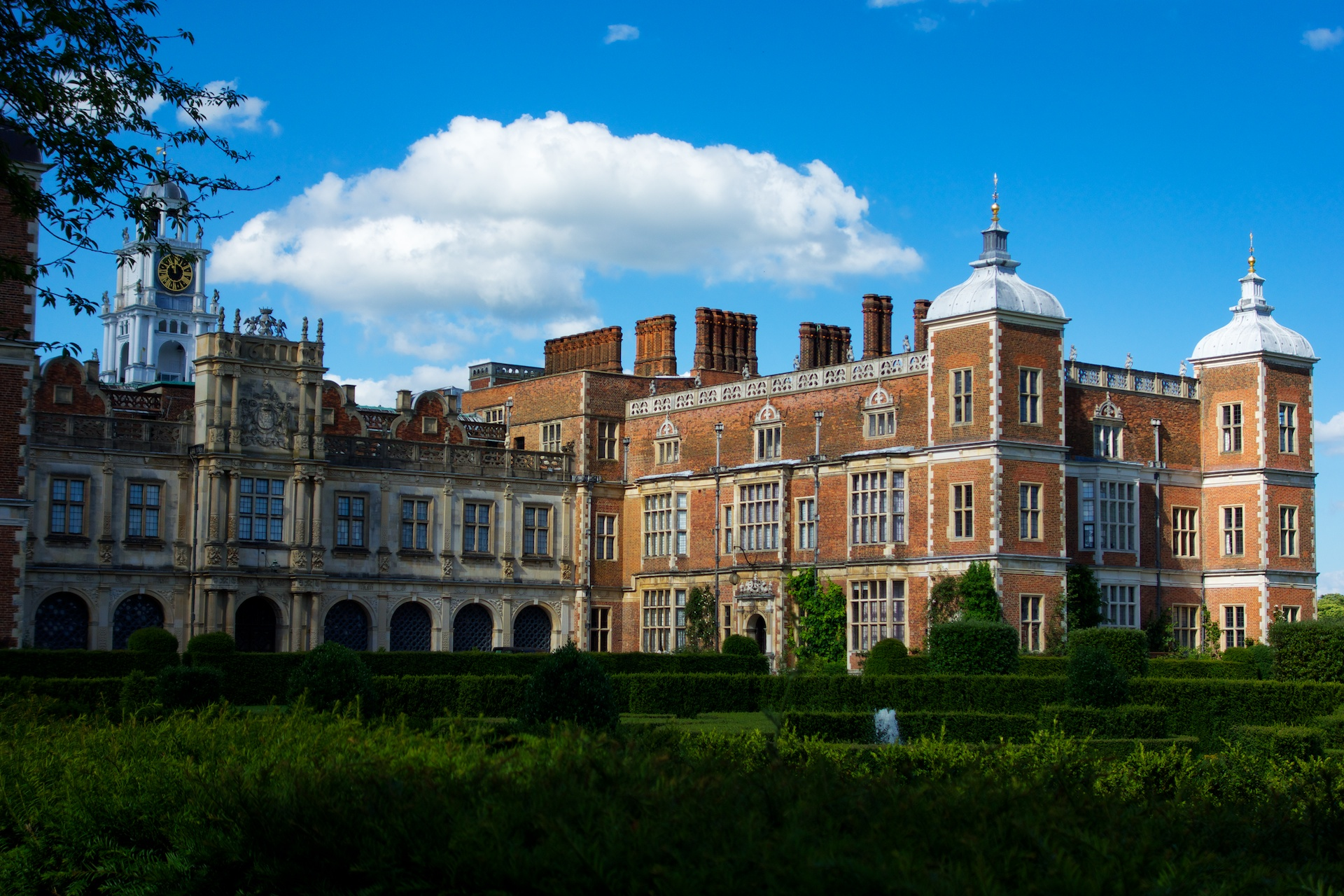
Hatfield House

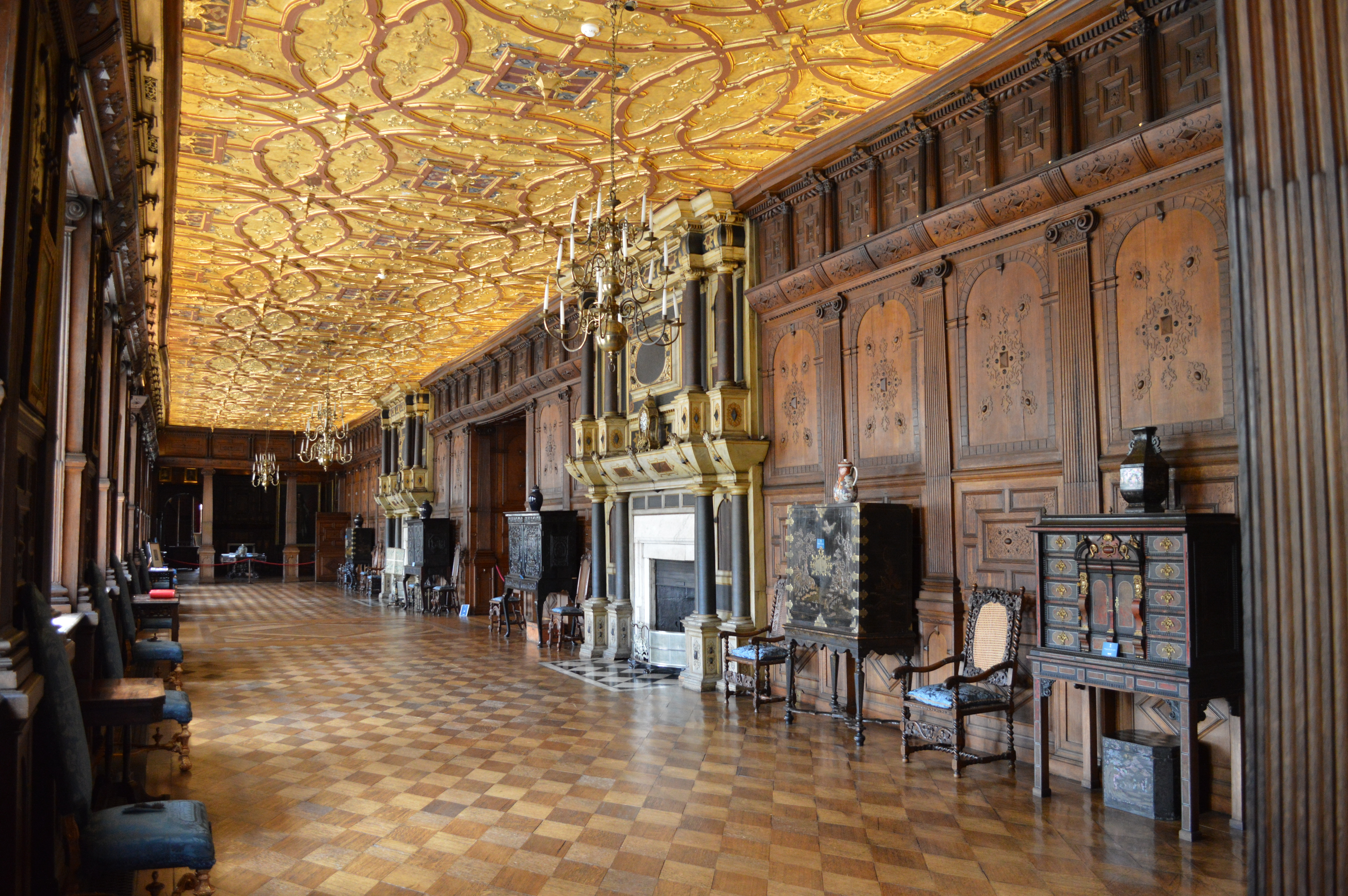
The Long Gallery

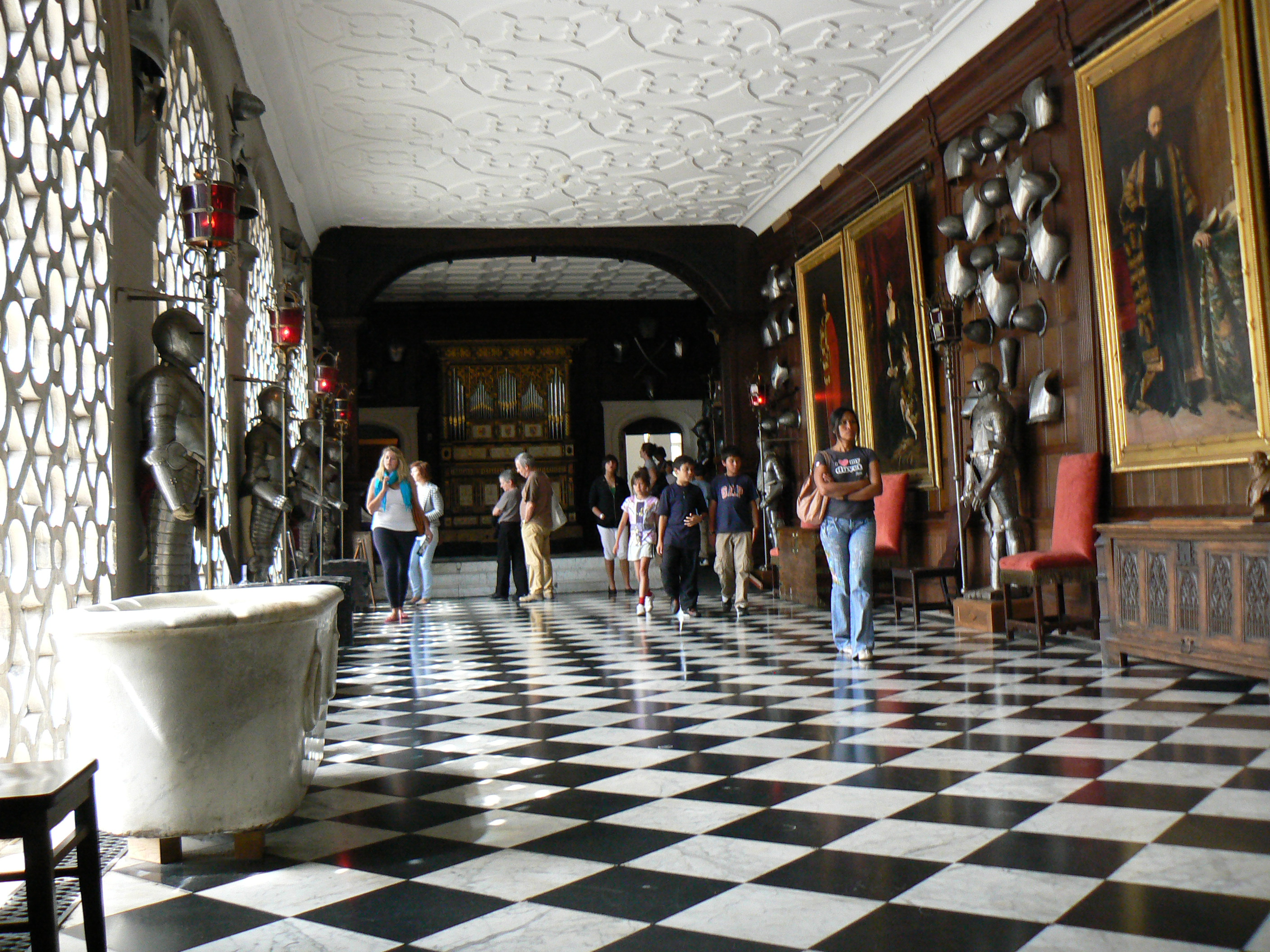
The Armoury

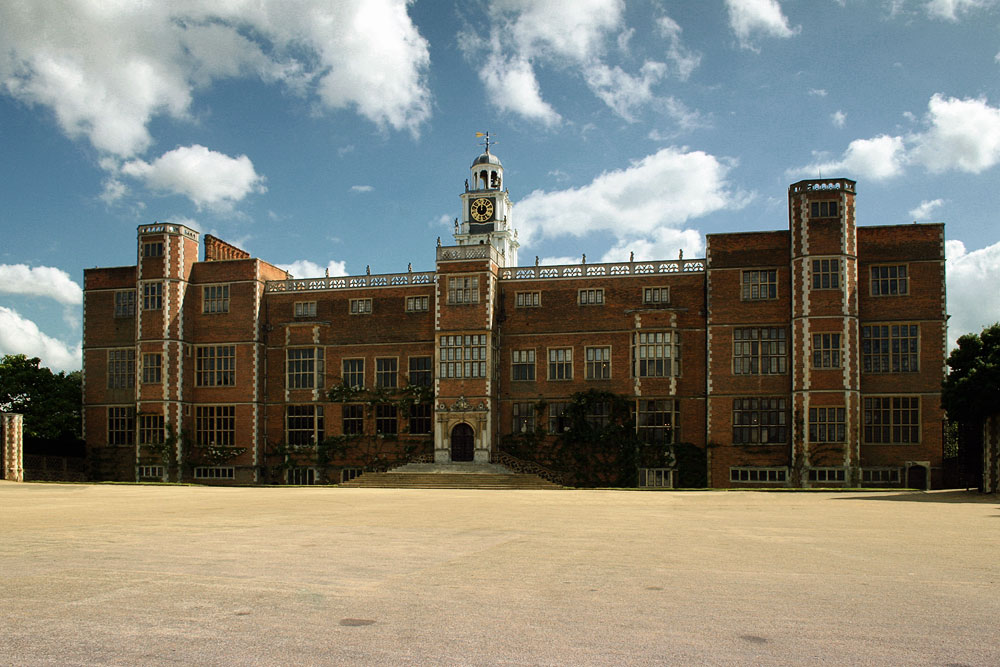
Hatfield house, North wing

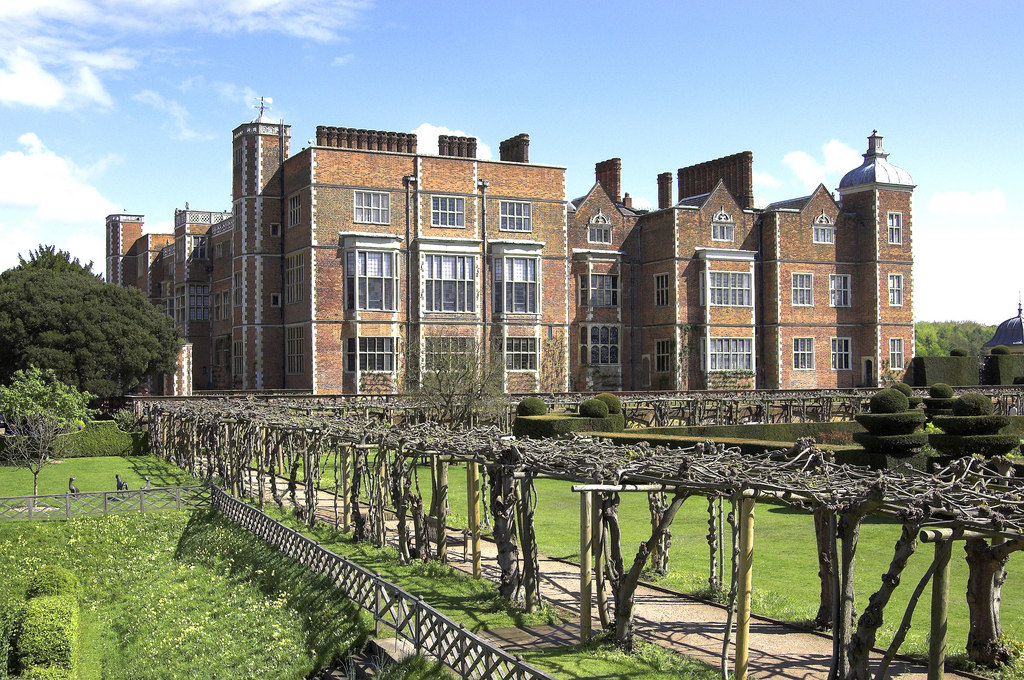
Hatfield House, Side view

== Film credits ==
Hatfield House has been used for location filming on a number of film and television productions, including: Greystoke: The Legend of Tarzan, Lord of the Apes (1984); Orlando (1992); Batman (1989); Tomb Raider: Underworld, Lara Croft Tomb Raider: The Cradle of Life, Rise of the Tomb Raider and Shadow of the Tomb Raider; Charlie and the Chocolate Factory (2005); The New World (2005); Elizabeth: The Golden Age (2007); Hot Fuzz (2007); Shakespeare in Love (1998); Dustbin Baby; Sherlock Holmes (2009); Agatha Christie's Marple (2010); Get Him to the Greek (2010); Antiques Roadshow (2010); MasterChef Australia (2010); Garden Secrets (2010); Royal Upstairs Downstairs (2011); My Week with Marilyn (2010); Paddington (2014); Mr. Holmes (2015); Doctor Thorne; Pride and Prejudice and Zombies (2016); The Crown; Breathe (2017); All the Money in the World (2017); Trust;The Favourite (2018); "Sucker" (2019); Enola Holmes; Rebecca (2020); Bridgerton (2020); Cromwell; Henry VIII and His Six Wives; The Avengers (1998); V for Vendetta; Mortdecai (2015); and Paddington 2.
