= Junbi =

Chain of cafes

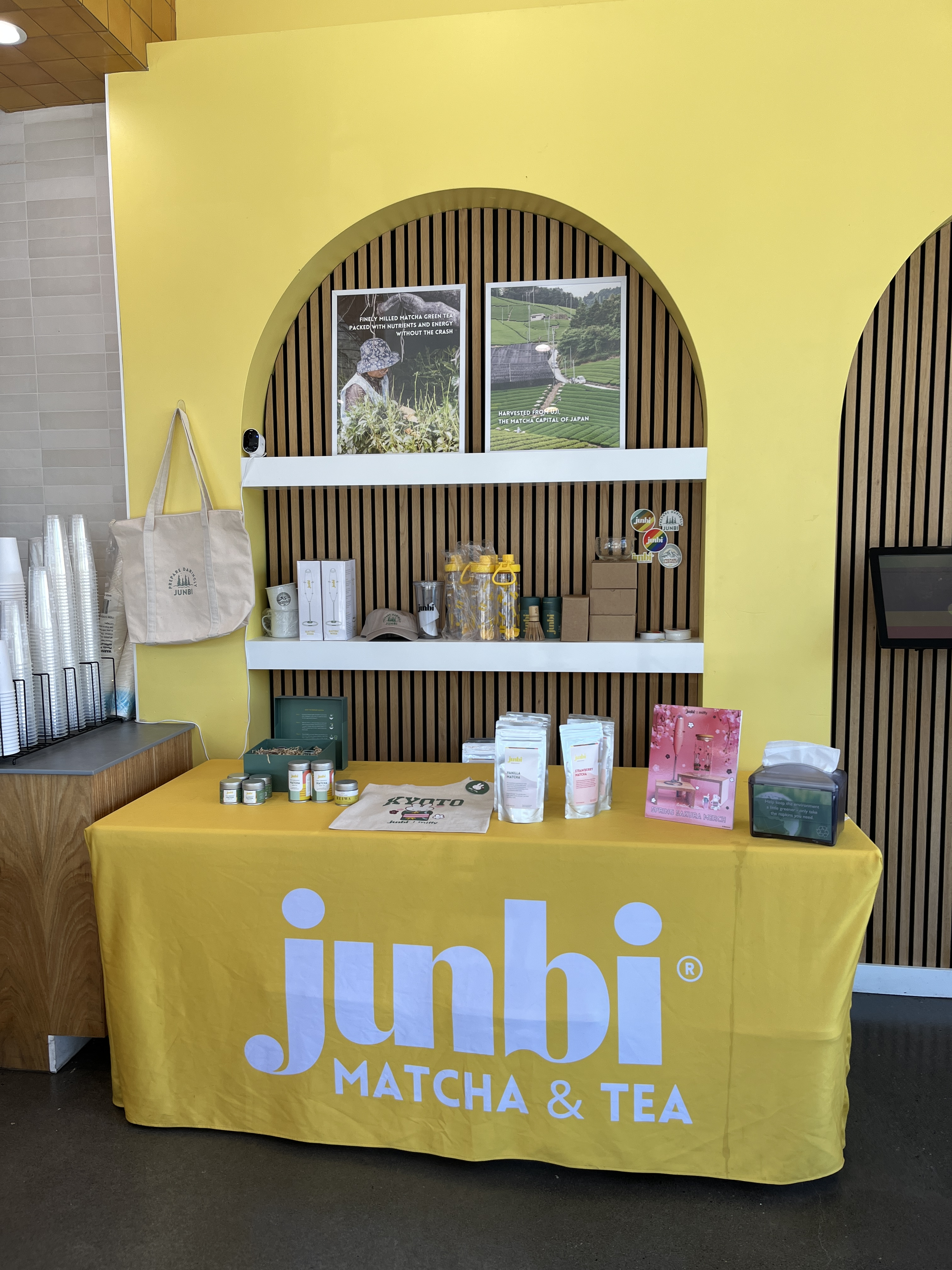
- Interior of the shop in the Sellwood-Moreland neighborhood of southeast Portland, Oregon, in 2025

Restaurant information
- Website: junbishop.com

Junbi Matcha & Tea, or simply Junbi, is a chain of cafes specializing in matcha drinks. The name means "preparation" in Japanese. Based in California, the business previously operated as Sip Matcha.

== Menu ==
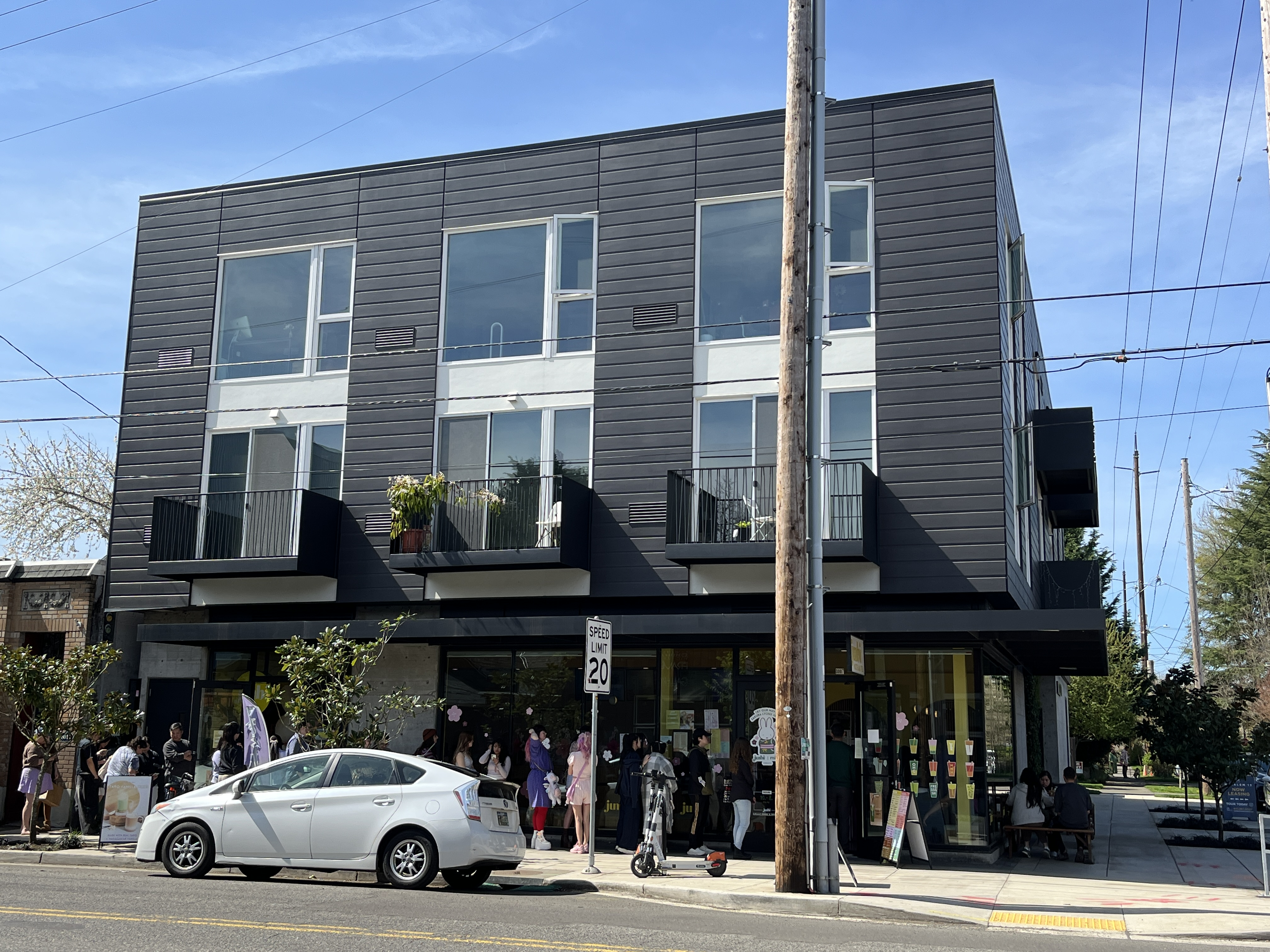
Queue at the location in Portland, Oregon, 2025

Among matcha drinks are the Strawberry Matcha and Yuzu Dragon Fruit Matcha.

== Locations ==
In California, Junbi has operated in Livermore, Mountain View, and San Francisco.

The franchise in Hawaii is led by investors David So and Joe Jitsukawa, as well as resident Greg Kobashigawa.

There are also locations in Portland, Oregon, Princeton, New Jersey, and Richardson, Texas. Junbi began operating in Seattle's Melrose Market in 2025.
