= Best Leftovers Ever! =

- Genre: Reality
- Country of origin: United States
- Original language: English
- No. of seasons: 1
- No. of episodes: 8

Production
- Running time: 34–35 minutes

Original release
- Network: Netflix
- Release: December 30, 2020

Best Leftovers Ever! is a 2020 television series. The premise revolves around a cooking competition where the goal is to use leftovers and turn them into something great. It was released on December 30, 2020 on Netflix.

== Cast ==
- Jackie Tohn
- David So
- Rosemary Shrager
- Shawn Niles
- Nate Wood
- Malikah Shavonne
- Jim Purvis
- Nigel Robertson
