= The Real Marigold Hotel =

British factual reality series

- Genre: Travel documentary
- Narrated by: Tom Hollander
- Country of origin: United Kingdom
- Original language: English
- No. of series: 4
- No. of episodes: 15

Production
- Running time: 50–60 minutes
- Production company: Twofour

Original release
- Release: 26 January 2016 – 28 May 2020

The Real Marigold Hotel (known in Australia as The Indian Dream Hotel) is a British travel documentary series created by Twofour productions, directed by Aparna Sanyal and broadcast on BBC One and BBC Two. The show, whose name is based on the film The Best Exotic Marigold Hotel, follows senior celebrities as they travel around India and experience the culture. In 2017, the show was nominated for a BAFTA in the category of Best Reality and Constructed Factual.

== Episodes ==
=== The Real Marigold Hotel ===
Series	Episodes	Air date	Participants	Location	Ref.
1	3	26 January – 9 February 2016	Miriam Margolyes, Sylvester McCoy, Wayne Sleep, Roy Walker, Rosemary Shrager, Bobby George, Patti Boulaye, Jan Leeming	India, Jaipur	
2	4	15 February – 15 March 2017	Bill Oddie, Paul Nicholas, Rustie Lee, Sheila Ferguson, Amanda Barrie, Lionel Blair, Dennis Taylor, Miriam Stoppard	India, Kochi	
3	4	1 – 22 August 2018	Stanley Johnson, Selina Scott, Stephanie Beacham, Susan George, Bob Champion, Syd Little, Janette and Ian Tough, Peter Dean	India, Udaipur	
4	4	30 April – 28 May 2020	John Altman, Duncan Bannatyne, Susie Blake, Henry Blofeld, Barbara Dickson, Britt Ekland, Paul Chuckle, Zandra Rhodes	India, Puducherry & Rishikesh	

=== The Real Marigold on Tour ===
Series	Episode	Air date	Participants	Location
1	1	27 December 2016	Miriam Margolyes, Wayne Sleep, Rosemary Shrager, Bobby George	United States, Florida
1	2	30 December 2016	Miriam Margolyes, Wayne Sleep, Rosemary Shrager, Bobby George	Japan, Kyoto
2	1	4 December 2017	Miriam Margolyes, Wayne Sleep, Rosemary Shrager, Bobby George	China, Chengdu
2	2	11 December 2017	Miriam Margolyes, Wayne Sleep, Jan Leeming, Bobby George	Cuba, Havana
2	3	20 December 2017	Sheila Ferguson, Rustie Lee, Paul Nicholas, Dennis Taylor	Iceland, Reykjavík
2	4	31 December 2017	Rosemary Shrager, Sheila Ferguson, Paul Nicholas, Dennis Taylor	Thailand, Chiang Mai
3	1	13 February 2019	Miriam Margolyes, Bobby George, Sheila Ferguson, Stanley Johnson	Russia, Saint Petersburg
3	2	20 February 2019	Wayne Sleep, Paul Nicholas, Sheila Ferguson, Jan Leeming	Argentina, Buenos Aires
3	3	27 February 2019	Wayne Sleep, Rosemary Shrager, Stephanie Beacham, Syd Little	Vietnam, Hanoi
3	4	6 March 2019	Rosemary Shrager, Paul Nicholas, Janette and Ian Tough	Mexico, Guadalajara & Ajijic

== Reception ==
First aired on BBC Two, the series was described as heart-warming by The Independent and credited by The Daily Telegraph as exposing the contrasting perceptions of ageism in India and the United Kingdom. The Radio Times called it funny and charming. The show was nominated for a BAFTA award for Best Reality and Constructed Factual. The first series was the highest rating factual series on BBC Two in 2016 with an average of 4.1 million and a 13.6 per cent share. It was also awarded a prestigious Rose d’Or Award for Reality and Factual Entertainment, a Grierson Award for Constructed Documentary Series, and a Broadcast Award for Popular Factual programme.

After the popularity of the first series, the show's second series was moved to BBC One where it continued to receive mostly positive reviews despite a different cast of celebrities. After the series ended, a new series named The Real Marigold on Tour was commissioned which saw celebrities travel to Florida and Japan. A second series was also produced which was broadcast at the end of 2017 with celebrities visiting China, Cuba, Iceland and Thailand.

== See also ==
- Arvind Singh Mewar
