= Queen Elizabeth's Oak, Hatfield House =

Tree in the grounds of Hatfield House, Hertfordshire, England

Queen Elizabeth's Oak
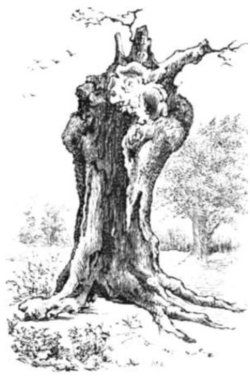
- Drawn by Joel Cook, 1882
- Interactive map of Queen Elizabeth's Oak
- Location: Hatfield House, Hertfordshire, England
- Date felled: Early 20th century

Queen Elizabeth's Oak was a tree in the grounds of Hatfield House, Hertfordshire, England. Elizabeth I is said to have been sitting beneath the tree when she was told of her accession to the throne in 1558. The tree was visited by Queen Victoria and Prince Albert in 1846, and they were presented with a branch and an acorn from it as a memento. The tree had deteriorated by the early 20th century and its remains were removed in 1978. A replacement oak was planted on the site by Elizabeth II in 1985.

== History ==
Hatfield Palace was acquired by Henry VIII in 1538 and served as a nursery for his children including Mary, Elizabeth, and Edward. When the Catholic Mary came to the throne in 1553, she kept Protestant Elizabeth under house arrest at the palace to prevent her from plotting to seize the throne. Elizabeth would often sit beneath the oak tree which came to bear her name.

When Mary died on 17 November 1558, Elizabeth succeeded to the throne. It is said that the messenger from London bearing this news imparted it to Elizabeth while she was sitting beneath this tree, reading the bible or eating an apple (or perhaps both). Elizabeth's famous response was supposedly "this is the Lord's doing, and it is marvelous in our eyes". Hatfield Palace was later swapped by James I for Theobalds House, owned by Robert Cecil, 1st Earl of Salisbury, one of Elizabeth's advisers. Cecil demolished much of the palace and built a new house nearby. The oak was located near to one of the avenues leading to the new house.

George III visited Hatfield House in 1800 and may have viewed the oak. Victoria and Albert visited in 1846, by which time the tree was enclosed by a fence and protected by a lead covering. A small branch from the tree and an acorn were presented to the queen as a memento. The American journalist Joel Cook visited the site and, in an 1882 book, described the remains of the oak as "one of the most precious memorials at Hatfield". By 1935, the tree was little more than a stump supported by props and bound with iron. The dead stump was removed on 17 November 1978, the 420th anniversary of the accession of Elizabeth and the remains are kept in storage. Elizabeth II planted a replacement oak tree on the site of the original on 22 July 1985.

== Modern times ==
The field the oak stands in has hosted a number of events. These have included an annual agricultural show, the Slam Dunk Festival South (pop-punk, ska punk, emo, metal and alternative rock festival) and, since 2008, the Folk by the Oak folk music festival.

== See also ==
- Queen Elizabeth's Oak
