= Aparna Sanyal =

Indian director and producer

Aparna Sanyal is an Indian director, producer and cultural practitioner. She has directed multiple nonfiction films, and produced several international documentary series, as well as independent short docs. She founded Mixed Media Productions, a production house based in Delhi with Gaurav Dhingra in 2008. She is also the Founder of The Red Door, a mental health initiative with a holistic approach. Between 2024-26, she was Managing Trustee of the India Chapter of the International Association of Women in Radio & Television (IAWRT). In November 2025, she was appointed Director of the Public Service Broadcasting Trust.

== Education ==
Aparna completed her graduation from Hindu College at the University of Delhi in Economics and pursued Mass Communication from A. J. K. Mass Communication Research Centre at Jamia Millia Islamia, New Delhi.

== Filmography and contributions ==
She directed A Drop of Sunshine, a film about schizophrenia. Her other films include Tedhi Lakeer - The Crooked Line, a film about two men and their not-so-straight lives in India; The Monks who won the Grammy, about the history, mythology and philosophy of Vajrayana Buddhism; Shovana, about the celebrated Kathak dancer and guru, Shovana Narayan, One Mustard Seed, on death and dying and The Second Buddha on Guru Padmasambhava.

She also directed Shunyata - When Kathak met Cham, a film about a performance in 2014 called Shunyata, where monks of a Buddhist monastery, Palpung Sherabling Monastic Seat, and the doyen of Kathak, the Indian classical dance form, Shovana Narayan came together to create a ballet on popular stories from Buddhist mythology.

She was also the programming head of the Delhi bureau of Times Now for about three years, from 2005 to 2008.

She has been a producer and line producer for several international documentary series filmed in India, including IRT - Deadliest Roads, a 10-part series for History, and The Real Marigold Hotel, a series for BBC 2.

Aparna was part of a group of filmmakers who ran 'FD Zone' in Delhi, a monthly screening of documentaries at the India Habitat Centre in Delhi between 2013-18.

In 2022, she wrote and directed a 10-part documentary series in Hindi, 'Kahani Navbharat Ki' (The India Story) for the Times Network. The series looked at 75 years of independent India between 1947-2022. The series was hosted by actor Vikrant Massey.

As Managing Trustee at IAWRT - Chapter India, she put together the 20th and 21st editions of the Asian Women's Film Festival.

== Awards and recognitions ==
- A Drop of Sunshine also won 5 awards at the Indian Documentary Producers' Association (IDPA) Awards in 2010.
- recognised as a 'Creative Entrepreneur' by the British Council in 2010.
- National Award for the Best Educational Film in 2012 for A Drop of Sunshine.
- 2nd Prize - We Care Festival - A Drop of Sunshine
- Best Film (Art & Religion) - Woodpecker International Film Festival (2019) - The Monks who won the Grammy
- Best Director - Dada Saheb Phalke Film Festival (2020) - One Mustard Seed
- Honorable Jury Mention - Dada Saheb Phalke Film Festival (2020) - The Monks who won the Grammy
- News Documentary - Limited Episodes - Hindi (2022) - News Television Awards for Kahani Navbharat Ki
- Best In-Depth Series / Documentary (Bronze) - ENBA (Exchange4Media News Broadcasting Awards) for Kahani Navbharat Ki (2022)
