= Do, Re & Mi =

French-American animated TV series

- Genre: Musical
- Created by: Michael Scharf; Jackie Tohn
- Directed by: Fabien Ouvrard
- Voices of: Kristen Bell; Jackie Tohn; Luke Youngblood
- Opening theme: "Do, Re & Mi" performed by Kristen Bell, Jackie Tohn and Luke Youngblood
- Composer: Jake Monaco
- Countries of origin: France; United States
- Original language: English
- No. of episodes: 26 (52 segments)

Production
- Executive producers: Michael Scharf; Jackie Tohn; Ivan Askwith; Kristen Bell; Corey Powell; Nicolas Atlan; Terry Kalagian; Sidonie Dumas; Christophe Riandee
- Producers: Kimberly Dennison; Alex Soto; Michelle Sullivan
- Running time: 22 minutes (11 minutes per segment)
- Production companies: Michael Made Me; Gaumont Animation; Amazon Studios

Original release
- Network: Amazon Prime Video
- Release: September 17, 2021 – July 29, 2022

Do, Re & Mi is an animated musical children's television series produced by Michael Made Me, Gaumont Animation and Amazon Studios that first aired on Gulli in France on 10 September 2020, and premiered exclusively on Amazon Prime Video in the United States on 17 September 2021.

== Premise ==
Do, Re and Mi live in the musical world of Beebopsburgh, an island where instruments grow in the Falsetto Forest and a Music Mountain towers above their adventures.

== Characters ==
- Do is a green owl. He has purple eyes and wears thick red glasses and a red and yellow hat with a yellow note on it. He has orange stubby legs and a big yellow beak. Do, the owl, is the inventor of the trio, chock full of information about science things and bird things and nature things and social things. Do never forgets a detail. Do's not a coordinated little owl, and could use some extra flying practice (particularly those landings). Do has confidence that one day the landing will stick, but is often held back by fear. Fortunately, Do's friends are always there to help any way they can. Where Mi forges ahead, Do will hesitate. Do likes to think about things before doing them. Do tends to be afraid of things - the dark, new places, new people, failure, etc. in contrast to Re and Mi who are fearless. Do is very determined when it comes to learning how to fly. He eventually learns how to in Flight School and Flap Your Own Way.
- Re is a pink hummingbird. She has blue-green eyes, white freckles on her face and a note mark on the left side of her face. She has rainbow colored legs and orange feet and wears a blue bowtie on her head. Re likes things to be organized and structured, which is almost impossible on a rollicking adventure with Mi, but Re tries. Re seeks the spotlight but, being so small, feels overlooked. Re loves to sing, loves to make raspberry cupcakes and play the tambourine.
- Mi is a blue and white bird. She has blue eyes, orange legs and an orange beak. She has slicked back blue hair and also has a black note marked on her torso. Mi, the blue jay songbird, has a big personality, and is always up for an adventure. Just like a preschooler, does not know how hold back, which makes Mi irresistible. Everyone wants to go where Mi is going because they know that's where the excitement and fun is going to be. Mi likes to lead and is supportive of Re and Do to get things going. Mi loves to play guitar and rock out.
- Presto is a yellow firefly with black stripes with orange eyes. He is Mi's pet.
- Maestro Moon is a white moon with green eyes. She acts as a teacher or mentor for Do Re and Mi and teaches them about musical terms.
- Harmony is a green star with purple eyes. He is always seen with Melody & Maestro Moon and help teach Do Re and Mi, and other characters musical terms.
- Melody is a pink star with green eyes. She is always seen with Harmony & Maestro Moon and help teach Do Re and Mi, and other characters musical terms.
- Seymore Saymore is a green and yellow parrot. He has a red beak and wears a red, pink, blue and yellow bowtie. He has blue eyes and orange legs. Seymore is an eager bird who wants to do the things that Do, Re and Mi do, like dancing and treasure hunting. However, he becomes upset if he feels like he is being left out or unable to follow Do, Re and Mi's steps. He's also very clumsy and constantly bumps into Do Re and Mi while dancing. Seymore often repeats words three times because he is a parrot.
- Juan Peacock is a tall purple peacock who wears a brown, yellow and red sombrero. He also wears a red bandana, has green eyes and long orange legs. Juan thinks highly of himself. He believes he's good at many things, like playing guitar and being a peacock, but he quickly gives up on things he's not good at, like Birdie Ball. He will try his best when encouraged by Do, Re and Mi. He is very attached to Pequena to the point where he will make others do things that remind him of Pequena, like making Do, Re and Mi ride in his hat, which Pequena does all the time. He is best friends with Pequena.
- Pequena is a small yellow, green, and red bird. She has blue eyes. Pequena is a very quiet and soft bird. She often gets shy when she is around Flora leading to awkward conversations. It isn't until Do, Re and Mi encourage Pequena to sing about her feelings to her. She is best friends with Juan Peacock.
- Ferris is a pink flamingo with black sneakers. He is often seen with Fryda and Flora.
- Flora is a pink flamingo with green eyes and a ponytail with a white scrunchie. Her beak is brown and yellow. She wears pink and white striped legwarmers and pink sneakers. She also has white stripes above her knees and white highlights on her wings. Flora is very graceful and agile as evident by her dance moves. She helps other birds by teaching dance classes. Flora is also very caring and sympathetic for others. She is always giving advice or words of encouragement to others, especially to Re. She is often seen with Fryda and Ferris.
- Fryda is a pink flamingo with black sneakers. She is often seen with Flora & Ferris.
- Bongo is a red woodpecker with blue eyes. He has a pink, red, and orange beak and orange legs. Bongo is a very energetic woodpecker. He loves playing the drums with Conga and the color red, but he will sometimes get competitive with Conga or disagree with her, leading to problems between them. He is the brother to Conga.
- Conga is a big yellow woodpecker with green eyes. She has a red and orange beak and orange stubby legs. Conga is a very energetic woodpecker. She loves playing the drums with Bongo and the color yellow, but she will sometimes get competitive with Bongo or disagree with him, leading to problems between them. She is the sister to Bongo.
- Mama Maddie is a big, red, and yellow chickadee. She is the mother to the Chikadees.
- The Chickadees are small red and yellow birds with various hairstyles. They are the children to Mama Maddie.
- The Cockatoos come in all sorts of colors. There is a blue cockatoo with yellow hair and brown eyes, a red cockatoo with red hair and blue eyes, a yellow and green cockatoo with yellow hair and blue eyes, and a pink cockatoo with pink hair and green eyes. The Cockatoos often sing together as a group, but they get so distracted with singing they would often ignore other birds talking to them.

== Episodes ==
No. overall	No. in series	Title	Original release date
1	1	Curious Birdious	17 September 2021
1	1	Rain Rain, You Can Stay	17 September 2021
Do wakes up to a mysterious sound and is curious to find out who's making it and why it's making his foot tap to the beat. Song: I'm Curious Mi's house starts to leak and ruins the birds' picnic plans as there's a rainstorm in Beebopsburgh. Song: Rain Rain Rain
2	2	Best Buggy Blues	17 September 2021
2	2	Listen To Your Body	17 September 2021
Presto is on holiday visiting his family for an overnight and Mi starts to miss him. Do & Re help Mi feel better. Song: Best Buggy Blues Re's tail is hurt and her friends try to keep her calm and let her body heal. Song: Listen To Your Body
3	3	Just Won't Quit	17 September 2021
3	3	Look at Me, Little Me	17 September 2021
Do starts to learns that if he keeps on trying and doesn't quit, he will be able to master a spectacular landing, which is one of the steps to flying. Song: Just Won't Quit Re has been invited to perform alongside Flora and the Flamingo-gos but doubts her tiny self next to the flamingos she admires so much. Song: Look at Me
4	4	Rasberry Cupcakes	17 September 2021
4	4	Together We're Not Alone	17 September 2021
Song: Rasberry Cupcakes Song: Together We're Not Alone
5	5	Maestro Moon Day	17 September 2021
5	5	Feathery Friends Day	17 September 2021
Re gets a bad case of the hiccups and thinks that she can't sing a special song to celebrate Maestro Moon while bouncing around. Song: Maestro Moon Day Song: Feathery Friends Day
6	6	Happy Hatchiversary	17 September 2021
6	6	Shake Your Tail Feathers	17 September 2021
Song: Happy Hatchiversary Song: Shake Your Tail Feathers
7	7	Day of the Pumpkins	1 October 2021
7	7	Once I Listened	1 October 2021
Song: Day of the Pumpkins Song: Once I Listened
8	8	Merry Nestivus	23 November 2021
Do, Re and Mi prepare for the Winter Nestivus festival but they worry it's not going to be special unless if they can get some snow from Music Mountain. Songs: We Gotta Find Snow, It's Nestivus
9	9	Follow The Conductor	13 January 2022
9	9	Birdie Opera	13 January 2022
Song: Follow The Conductor
10	10	Movin' to the Groove	13 January 2022
10	10	Take a Deep Breath	13 January 2022
Song: Take a Deep Breath
11	11	Hush a Hummingbird	13 January 2022
11	11	You Gotta Try Try Try	13 January 2022
Song: Hush a Hummingbird Song: You Gotta Try Try Try
12	12	Beebopsburgh Rocks	13 January 2022
12	12	Gimme a High Feather	13 January 2022
Song: Beebopsburgh Rocks Song: Gimme a High Feather
13	13	Waiting For Seymour	13 January 2022
13	13	A Song To See	13 January 2022
Song: A Song To See
14	14	Birdie Bowl Concert	8 April 2022
Songs:
15	15	Hootenanny Jam	22 April 2022
15	15	Bicycle Built For You	22 April 2022
Song: Hootenanny Jam Song: Bicycle Built For You
16	16	Bird Bath Blunder	22 April 2022
16	16	Fasolati	22 April 2022
Song: Bird Bath Blunder Song: Fasolati
17	17	Birdie Bake Off	22 April 2022
17	17	Sleep-O-Over	22 April 2022
Song: Birdie Bake Off Song: Sleep-O-Over
18	18	Dance Till You Drop	22 April 2022
18	18	Star Ball	22 April 2022
Song: Song: Star Ball
19	19	Mi's Berry Bounce	22 April 2022
19	19	Tweeting Games	22 April 2022
Song: Song:
20	20	Song From The Heart	22 April 2022
20	20	Who Wants To Be Like Me?	22 April 2022
Song: Song:
21	21	Ha Ha Hummingbird	29 July 2022
21	21	Buzzing The Way	29 July 2022
Song: Song:
22	22	Re The Brave	29 July 2022
22	22	Cooling To The Beat	29 July 2022
Song: Song:
23	23	Flight School	29 July 2022
23	23	All About Juan Peacock	29 July 2022
Song: Song:
24	24	Sing It Forward	29 July 2022
24	24	Do, Re, Remember Mi?	29 July 2022
Song: Song:
25	25	Music Blossoms & Blooms	29 July 2022
25	25	Vine and Dandy	29 July 2022
Song: Song:
26	26	Shoobop Gone	29 July 2022
26	26	Flap Your Own Way	29 July 2022
Song: Song:
