= Rosemary Shrager's School for Cooks =

- Genre: Reality
- Presented by: Rosemary Shrager
- Narrated by: Robert Llewellyn
- Country of origin: United Kingdom

Production
- Producer: RDF Media
- Running time: 60 minutes (including adverts)

Original release
- Network: ITV
- Release: 5 November 2007 – 19 December 2008

Related
- ITV Food

Rosemary Shrager's School for Cooks, is a real life cuisine programme presented by celebrity chef Rosemary Shrager. It was produced by RDF Media and screened by ITV in the United Kingdom.

Each week, 8 amateur chefs are brought into Shrager's cookery school. Throughout the week, the students divided into two teams, and were given three recipes to make throughout the day, a starter, main and dessert courses. Every day one student was eliminated, except on Wednesdays when, not one, but two students were eliminated. Therefore, three students went into the final on Friday, the winner then got a chance to work in a Michelin-starred restaurant. In 2009, ITV announced the show had been axed due to poor ratings.

Runner up Chris Clyburn from series one went on to set up a successful Catering Company Oliver's Catering after appearing on the show.

== Transmissions ==
Series	Start date	End date	Episodes
1	5 November 2007	14 December 2007	30
2	27 October 2008	19 December 2008	40
