= The Girls of Hedsor Hall =

- Genre: Reality
- Starring: Tara Conner
- Judges: Rosemary Shrager; Gill Harbord
- Country of origin: United States
- No. of seasons: 1
- No. of episodes: 8

Original release
- Network: MTV
- Release: February 9 – April 4, 2009

The Girls of Hedsor Hall is a 2009 MTV reality television series similar to Ladette to Lady and VH1's Charm School. The series takes 12 out-of-control American girls to Hedsor House, a filming, wedding, conference and events venue in the United Kingdom. There, a finishing school called Hedsor Hall was created where they will try to become ladies. The girl who improves the most will receive the Hedsor Trust, which is worth $100,000.

== Contestants ==
- Host: Tara Conner
- Headmistress: Gill Harbord
- Disciplinarian: Rosemary Shrager
- Housemaid: Dina Lees

Name	Age	Episode Eliminated
Kimberly Ferrari	22	Winner
Brianna Frost Hogan	21	Episode 8 (Runner-up)
Samantha LaBonte	22	Episode 8
Hillary Diaz	22	Episode 7
Jenna Heiss	22	Episode 6
Paola Perales	24	Episode 5
Jennifer Morina	23	Episode 4
Margie Stubbs	24	Episode 4
Jen Marden	22	Episode 3
Maddy Siedlick	24	Episode 2
Lillian Justice	24	Episode 2
Amanda Fabbri	22	Episode 1

== Episode progress ==
#	Contestants	Episodes								
#	Contestants	1	2	3	4	5	6	7	8	
1	Kimberly	SAFE	WIN	SAFE	WIN	SAFE	SAFE	SAFE	SAFE	WINNER
2	Brianna	SAFE	RISK	SAFE	RISK	SAFE	SAFE	SAFE	SAFE	RUNNER UP
3	Samantha	SAFE	RISK	SAFE	SAFE	WIN	SAFE	SAFE	OUT	
4	Hillary	SAFE	SAFE	SAFE	RISK	SAFE	WIN	OUT		
5	Jenna	RISK	SAFE	RISK	SAFE	SAFE	OUT			
6	Paola	SAFE	SAFE	SAFE	RISK	OUT				
7	Jennifer	SAFE	SAFE	SAFE	OUT					
8	Margie	RISK	SAFE	RISK	OUT					
9	Jen	SAFE	SAFE	OUT						
10	Maddy	SAFE	OUT							
11	Lillian	SAFE	OUT							
12	Amanda	OUT								

The contestant won The Girls of Hedsor Hall
The contestant was Runner up
The contestant won the week's challenge
The contestant was safe from expulsion
The contestant was at risk for expulsion
The contestant was at risk for expulsion, but was told she won the challenge
The contestant was expelled
The contestant was expelled outside of The Student Board of Review
The contestant was expelled without being at risk for expulsion

== Episodes ==
=== Episode 1: "Assessment and Appearance" ===
First aired February 9, 2009

- Challenge: Behavior at a Cocktail Party
- Bottom Three: Margie, Amanda, Jenna
- Expelled: Amanda
- Reason: Mrs. Shrager, Ms. Harbord and Ms. Conner all felt that Amanda's constant fighting and swearing was disruptive. Further, when Mrs. Shrager woke everyone up that morning and saw that Amanda was covered in makeup, she asked Amanda what she looked like, to which Amanda rudely replied, "I look like I'm in a lot of fucking pain right now," angering Mrs. Shrager.

=== Episode 2: "Etiquette" ===
First aired February 25, 2009

- Challenge: Etiquette (in Balance, Art, Flower Arranging, Conversation Skills, Wine Tasting, and Behavior in a Luncheon)
- Challenge Winner: Kimberly (in Flower Arranging)
- Challenge Prize: The flower arrangement will be put on the Lucheon table
- Bottom Three: Brianna, Samantha, and Maddy
- Expelled: Maddy & Lillian (Eliminated outside of the Student Board Of Review)
- Reason': Lillian refused to come to her classes, causing Mrs. Shrager and Ms. Harbord to step forward and demand answers from her. Ms. Harbord asked Lillian to define "respect" to which she replied that she's "not a dictionary," causing her to be expelled instantly. Maddy drank too much at her Wine Tasting Lesson, then told the girls that she wanted to go home and eventually told her teachers, eliminating her.

=== Episode 3: "Expanding Horizons" ===
First aired February 28, 2009

- Challenge: Expanding One's Horizon (in Behavior in National Breakfast, Falconry, Plucking pheasants, Hosting or Cooking for a Dinner and Behavior at a Dinner)
- Challenge Winner: Margie (in Falconry)
- Challenge Prize: A Badge
- Bottom Three: Jen, Jenna, Margie
- Expelled: Jen
- Reason: Jen offered her prescription drugs to her roommates. Further, she kept talking during her breakfast lesson, causing Mrs. Shrager to tell her to shut up. She also cried and freaked out during the pheasant shoot and when she plucked the pheasants.

=== Episode 4: "Anger Management" ===
First aired March 7, 2009

- Challenge: Anger Management (in Criticism, Fencing, Cooking, and behavior around men)
- Challenge Winner: Kimberly (in fencing)
- Challenge Prize: A call home
- Bottom Three: Hillary, Paola, Brianna
- Expelled: Margie & Jennifer
- Reason: When the girls were going out to eat at a local restaurant, Ms. Harbord criticized Margie's outfit, saying it was inappropriate. Initially, Margie started to cry and she stormed out, leaving the girls to go to dinner without her. Jennifer had been told more than once by Mrs. Shrager to remove her makeup and when Mrs. Shrager noticed that her makeup was on once again during cooking, she yelled at Jennifer to get out of the kitchen and take off her makeup.

=== Episode 5: "Country Weekend" ===
First aired March 14, 2009

- Challenge: Temptation (in Sexual Etiquette, Waltzing, Hostessing and behavior at Hedsor Hall alone)
- Challenge Winner: Samantha (in Waltzing)
- Challenge Prize: A free pass during elimination, meaning that she couldn't get eliminated
- Bottom: Everyone was at risk this week.
- Expelled: Paola
- Reason: Paola failed as a Hostess. She constantly excused herself from dinner, leaving her bachelor all alone.

=== Episode 6: "Job Training" ===
First aired March 21, 2009

- Challenge: Job Training (Cooking and working at a London Hotel)
- Challenge Winner: Hillary (in Cooking)
- Challenge Prize: Leader
- Bottom: Everyone was at risk this week.
- Expelled: Jenna
- Reason: Jenna lied to the hotel manager during her interview, by saying no when asked if she'd been in jail. At the hotel, she and Brianna took over 2 hours to clean one room when the hotel manager needed 20 rooms cleaned. Infuriated by this, Jenna told the manager off, and left.

=== Episode 7: "Reflection" ===
First aired March 28, 2009

- Challenge: Reflection (in disciplining women who act exactly the same as the contestants when they first came here)
- Challenge Winner: No One
- Challenge Prize: Nothing
- Bottom: Everyone was at risk this week.
- Expelled: Hillary
- Reason: Hillary failed her Appearance lesson, by not managing to make the UK girls wear something more appropriate and suitable. Initially, Samantha had to take charge of Hillary's lesson and made the UK girls change into more appropriate clothes.

=== Episode 8: "The Trust" ===
First aired April 4, 2009

- Challenge:
- Challenge Winner: No One
- Challenge Prize: Nothing
- Bottom: Everyone was at risk this week.
- Expelled: Samantha
- Reason: Mrs. Shrager, Ms. Harbord and Ms. Conner felt that she wasn't as good as Kimberly and Brianna.
- Graduates (Final 2): Brianna and Kimberly
- Winner: Kimberly
- Runner Up: Brianna
