= Ivan Day =

Food historian

- Day in 2013
- Born: 1949 or 1950; Ireland
- Occupation: Food historian

Ivan Day (born 1949 or 1950) is an Irish-English food historian. Writing in 2010, the food writer Bee Wilson credited Day as, "no contest, the leading expert on historic cookery in Britain".

== Biography ==
Ivan Day was born in 1949 or 1950 in Ireland. His father was a fisherman, and in the years after World War II when food was limited, Day's father hunted fish and game to supplement the family's meals.

Day gained an interest in food history at the age of 13, after encountering John Nott's The Cooks and Confectioners Dictionary (1723) in an antiquarian bookseller in Colchester, Essex. Finding the archaic language and instructions funny, he purchased a copy. He continued to purchase old cookery books through his teen years, and recreated some for his family during school breaks. Day went on to attend university, where he trained in biology, then art history, before moving into the field of food history. He lived for a time in Greece as a young man, where he learned to cook over an open fire, and at 21 started a catering business, serving period fare. At one point, Day ran a restaurant.

As he moved into a career in food history, Day took on work as a consultant on historian kitchens, kitchenware and dishes. His clients included films and television makers, museums, and heritage organisations such as the National Trust. (Note: An anecdote, recounted in a profile in the Telegraph, describes Martin Scorsese calling Day "out of the blue" to enlist Day as the cook for a banquet in The Young Victoria, a film he was producing on Queen Victoria.) Heston Blumenthal consulted Day regularly during the 2000s, informing his work at The Hind's Head and his television show Feast. He wrote on food history in magazines, and by 2005 he had authored five books. By the 2010s, Day was running a weekly cooking courses out of a 17th-century farmhouse in the Lake District, Cumbria. The farmhouse contained both a modern and historic kitchen. Besides his consulting, writing and teaching work, Day has also worked as a judge at the World Marmalade Awards.

He owns a collection of old cooking books and tools, including pastry brushes made with goose feathers and roasting jacks. In a 2014 profile in the Financial Times, Day cites "a common potato pudding to be fired below roasted meat" from the Scottish writer Susanna MacIver's Cookery, and pastry (1773) as his favourite historical recipe, while contending that he would rather live in the modern day, indulging in historic cookery recreationally.

Day is married to his wife, Jill. As of the mid-2000s, his hobbies included fiddling and fell walking.

== Gallery ==
Pies produced by Day

A table setting of Day's

Another Day table setting

Day in 2021, in his kitchen
