= Rosemary Shrager =

British chef and TV presenter (born 1951)

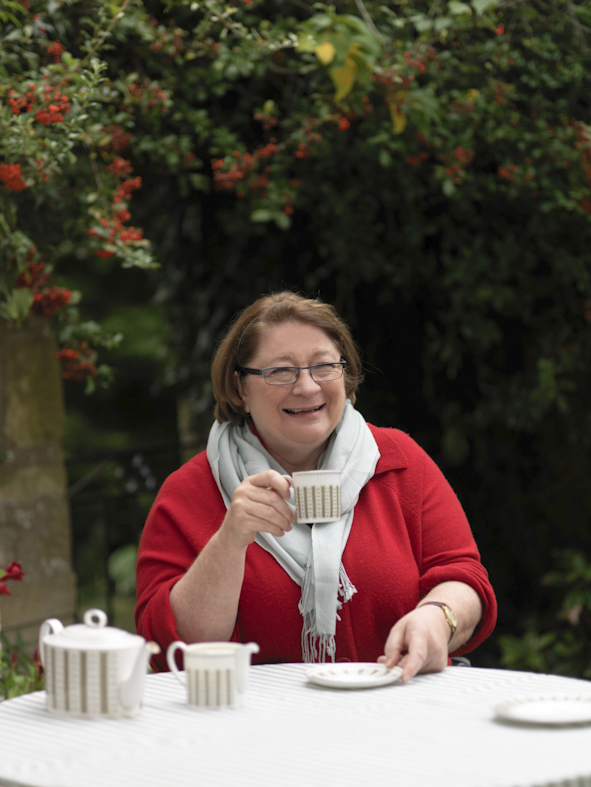
- Shrager in 2010
- Born: Rosemary Worlledge; 21 January 1951 (age 75); London, England
- Education: Heatherley School of Fine Art
- Spouse: Michael Shrager (m. 1974; died 2020)
- Children: 2
- Culinary career
- Current restaurant
- Rosemary Shrager's Cookery School (2013-)
- Previous restaurant
- Amhuinnsuidhe Castle (1998–2002) Swinton Park (2002–2012)
- Television shows
- Rosemary Shrager's School for Cooks (2007–2008); Soapstar Superchef (2007); Local Food Hero (2006–2009); Ladette to Lady (2005–2010); Taste The Nation (2009); Chopping Block (2016-2017); Culinary Genius (2017); The Big Family Cooking Showdown (2017); Best Leftovers Ever! (2020)
- Website: Website

Rosemary Jacqueline Shrager (née Worlledge; born 21 January 1951) is a British chef and TV presenter, best known for being a haute cuisine teacher on the reality television programme Ladette to Lady, and as a judge on Soapstar Superchef. She also made an appearance on the reality TV series I'm A Celebrity... Get Me Out Of Here!. Other television projects have included Kitchen Showdown with Rosemary Shrager, where she weaned unhealthy fast-food families onto nutritious cuisine. Shrager is an accomplished chef and has worked with fellow Soapstar Superchef judge Jean-Christophe Novelli.

The daughter (and third child) of John Worlledge, a company executive, and his wife, June Rosemary Twentyman Davis, Shrager was educated at Northwich School of Art and Design and Heatherley School of Fine Art, with the intention of becoming an architect. She was married to Michael Shrager, a barrister, until his death in 2020. They married when she was 21; they had two children together. After her marriage, she established a catering company.

== Television ==
In 2007 and 2008, she hosted her cookery series Rosemary Shrager's School for Cooks, where ten contestants competed for the opportunity to work in a Michelin star restaurant.

Shrager played the part of a strict, no-nonsense headmistress on the American reality show The Girls of Hedsor Hall in 2009.

She and the food historian and author Ivan Day recreated dishes cooked for Queen Victoria on the 2011 BBC series Royal Upstairs Downstairs. She is now known for cooking daily on The Alan Titchmarsh Show from 2010 until 2012 and on What's Cooking? during May 2013.

On 14 November 2012, it was confirmed that Rosemary had joined the cast of I'm A Celebrity... Get Me Out Of Here! as a late entrant and was voted out by the public on 27 November 2012, finishing in 6th place out of 12 celebrities.

In 2016, Rosemary appeared in the three-part BBC series, The Real Marigold Hotel, which followed a group of celebrity senior citizens including actress Miriam Margolyes and dancer Wayne Sleep on a journey to India. She also appeared on The Real Marigold on Tour to Florida and Kyoto in 2016, Chengdu and Chiang Mai in 2017.

Shrager was a judge on the ITV daytime series Chopping Block, alongside John Whaite, in 2016 and 2017 and was a guest judge on Culinary Genius in 2017. Additionally, Shrager was a judge on the BBC's show The Big Family Cooking Showdown, alongside Giorgio Locatelli, in 2017.

== Television credits ==
- Ladette to Lady (2005–2010)
- Soapstar Superchef (2007)
- Rosemary Shrager's School for Cooks (2007–2008)
- The Girls of Hedsor Hall (2009)
- The Alan Titchmarsh Show (2010–2012)
- Royal Upstairs Downstairs (2011)
- All Star Family Fortunes (2012)
- I'm A Celebrity... Get Me Out Of Here! (2012)
- Who Wants to be a Millionaire?: Live Celebrity Special (2012)
- Gordon Ramsay: Cookalong Live (2012)
- Let's Dance for Comic Relief (2013)
- What's Cooking? (2013)
- Catchphrase: Celebrity Special (26 May 2013)
- Tipping Point: Lucky Stars (2013)
- Big Star's Little Star (2013)
- The Chase: Celebrity Special (2013)
- Ladies of London (2014)
- Draw It! (2014)
- Celebrity Fifteen to One (2014)
- The Indian Dream Hotel (2016)
- The Real Marigold Hotel (2016)
- Chopping Block (2016—2017)
- Culinary Genius (2017)
- The Big Family Cooking Showdown (2017)
- Best Leftovers Ever! (2020)
- Cooking With the Stars (2021)

== Publications ==
- Castle Cook (2001)
- School for Cooks (2008)
- Yorkshire Breakfast (2011)
- Absolutely Foolproof Classic Home Cooking (2011)
- Absolutely Foolproof Food for Family & Friends (2012)

== Bibliography ==
- Shrager, Rosemary; Gaisford, Sue, Rosemary: Castle Cook, Everyman's Library, 19 January 2001, ISBN 978-1-84159-049-3
- Shrager, Rosemary, School for Cooks, Dorling Kindersley Publishers Ltd, 1 August 2008, ISBN 978-1-4053-3513-3
- Shrager, Rosemary, 'Absolutely Foolproof', Octopus Publishing Group Ltd, 2 May 2011, ISBN 978-0-600-62207-9
