= Helen Flanagan =

English actress (born 1990)

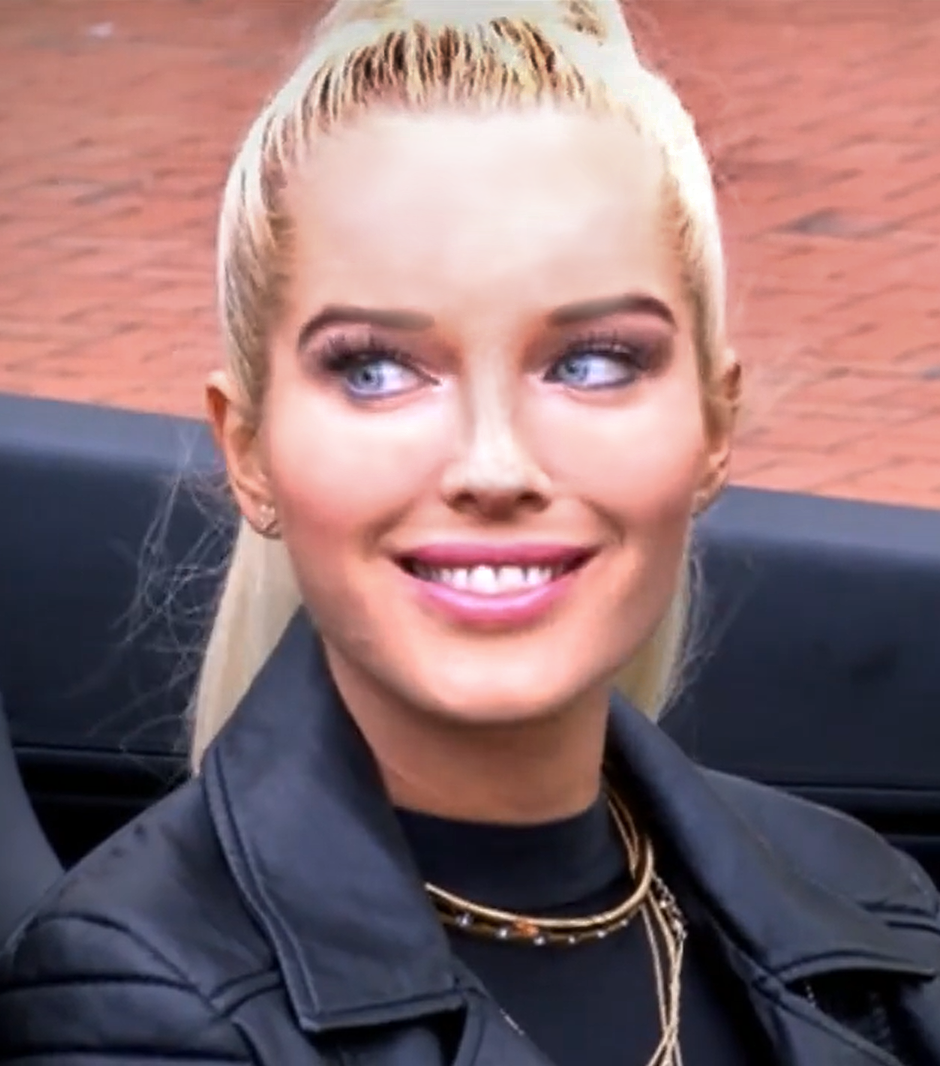
- Flanagan in 2014
- Born: Helen Joyce Flanagan; 7 August 1990 (age 36); Bury, Greater Manchester, England
- Occupations: Actress; model; television personality
- Years active: 2000–present
- Partner: Scott Sinclair (2009–2022)
- Children: 3

Helen Joyce Flanagan (born 7 August 1990) is an English actress, model and television personality. She is known for portraying Rosie Webster in the ITV soap opera Coronation Street from 2000 to 2012; she returned to the role in 2017, before going on maternity leave on 8 June 2018, from which she did not return.

Flanagan has appeared on various reality television shows, including I'm a Celebrity...Get Me Out of Here! (2012), Celebrity Super Spa (2013), I'm a Celebrity...South Africa (2023), Celebs Go Dating (2024) and Celebrity Ex on the Beach (2026).

== Early life ==
Flanagan was born in Bury, Greater Manchester, England. She attended Westholme School in Blackburn, Lancashire.

== Career ==
Flanagan first appeared as Rosie Webster in Coronation Street in January 2000. In 2006, she was nominated for the award of "Best Dramatic Performance from a Young Actor or Actress" at the British Soap Awards, losing to Ellis Hollins of Hollyoaks. In 2007, she was nominated for "Villain of the Year" at the same awards, this time losing to Coronation Street co-star Jack P. Shepherd. In 2010, Flanagan appeared in Coronation Street spin-off Coronation Street: A Knights Tale as her character Rosie Webster. In 2011, she had her own Coronation Street spin-off Just Rosie, which explored her character Rosie Webster trying to build a modelling career in London. Flanagan left Coronation Street in February 2012 to pursue other interests.

In November 2012, Flanagan participated in the twelfth series of I'm a Celebrity...Get Me Out of Here!, finishing in seventh place. In September 2013 she appeared in Celebrity Super Spa, a reality-television programme based in a Liverpool Salon on Channel 5. In January 2014, Flanagan starred in an episode of Celebrity Wedding Planner alongside Hugo Taylor on Channel 5. The following August she appeared as agency nurse Kirsty Brompton in an episode of Holby City. In October 2016, it was announced Flanagan would reprise her role as Rosie in Coronation Street in February 2017. She left on maternity leave in June 2018.

In 2023, Flanagan was a contestant in I'm a Celebrity... South Africa, leaving on day 12 of the show in joint 7th place, after a double eviction with Dean Gaffney. In 2024, Flanagan appeared on the thirteenth series of the E4 series Celebs Go Dating. In 2026, she appeared on the fourth series of Celebrity Ex on the Beach.

== Personal life ==
In 2016, Flanagan announced that she has been diagnosed with both attention deficit hyperactivity disorder (ADHD) and bipolar disorder. In 2024, she revealed that she had suffered a psychotic episode due to a reaction to ADHD medication. Additionally, she has previously opened up about her struggles with premenstrual dysphoric disorder.

Flanagan became engaged to footballer, Scott Sinclair on 31 May 2018. They have two daughters, and a son. In October 2022, the media reported that Flanagan's relationship with Sinclair had ended after 13 years.

== Filmography ==
Year	Title	Role	Notes
2000–2012, 2017–2018	Coronation Street	Rosie Webster	Series Regular, 1,073 episodes
2004	Children in Need	Herself	1 episode
2006	Holly & Stephen's Saturday Showdown	Herself	1 episode
2006–2007	Soapstar Superstar	Herself	4 episodes
2008	Xposé	Herself	1 episode
2009	Ant & Dec's Saturday Night Takeaway	Herself / Rosie Webster	1 episode
2009	Hell's Kitchen	Herself	1 episode
2009	All Star Family Fortunes	Herself	Special
2010	Coronation Street: A Knights Tale	Rosie Webster	Coronation Street spin-off
2011	Just Rosie	Rosie Webster	Coronation Street spin-off, transmitted on ITV2
2012	I'm a Celebrity...Get Me Out of Here!	Herself	7th place
2013, 2014	Big Brother's Bit on the Side	Herself	Panelist, 2 episodes
2013	Celebrity Super Spa	Herself	Series 1, 6 episodes
2013	Celebrity Juice	Herself	Guest
2013	8 out of 10 Cats	Herself	1 episode
2013	I Love My Country	Herself	Guest panelist
2013	Tricked	Herself	Series 1, episode 4
2013	The 50 Funniest Moments of 2013	Herself	Documentary
2014	Fake Reaction	Herself	Guest
2014	Celebrity Wedding Planner	Herself	1 episode
2014	Virtually Famous	Herself	1 episode
2014	Holby City	Kirsty Brompton	1 episode
2014	Keep it in the Family	Herself	1 episode
2015	Hugh's War on Waste	Herself	3 episodes
2018	Celebrity Catchphrase	Herself	1 episode
2018, 2019	Lorraine	Herself	2 episodes
2019	CelebAbility	Herself	1 episode
2019	Coronation Street at Christmas	Herself	TV special
2020	Celebrity Antiques Road Trip	Herself	1 episode
2021	Lorraine	Herself	1 episode
2023	I'm a Celebrity... South Africa	Herself	Evicted day 12, finished joint 7th
2024	Celebs Go Dating	Herself	Cast member; series 13
2024	The Wheel	Herself	1 episode
2026	Celebrity Ex on the Beach	Herself	Cast member; series 4

== Awards and nominations ==
Year	Award	Category	Result	Ref.
2006	British Soap Awards	Best Dramatic Performance from a Young Actor or Actress	Nominated	
2008	British Soap Awards	Villain of the Year	Nominated	
2008	Inside Soap Awards	Best Bitch	Nominated	
2009	British Soap Awards	Sexiest Female	Nominated	
2009	Inside Soap Awards	Best Bitch	Nominated	
2010	British Soap Awards	Sexiest Female	Nominated	
2011	British Soap Awards	Sexiest Female	Nominated	
2017	Inside Soap Awards	Funniest Female	Nominated	
2017	Inside Soap Awards	Sexiest Female	Nominated	
