= Celebrity Wedding Planner =

- Country of origin: United Kingdom
- Original language: English
- No. of series: 3
- No. of episodes: 10

Production
- Running time: 60 minutes (inc. adverts)
- Production companies: Renegade Pictures and Motion Content Group

Original release
- Network: Channel 5
- Release: 6 January 2012 – 1 January 2014

Celebrity Wedding Planner is a British reality television series that premiered on Channel 5 on 6 January 2012. The series revolves around brides-to-be handing over the planning of their wedding to a surprise celebrity or celebrity pairing.

The series proved successful and was commissioned for third and fourth series in November 2012.

== Format ==
One or two celebrities are given the task of organising a couple's wedding day. All they are given is a 60-second message from the couple, a tour of the couple's house and two sidekicks from either partner to help them with the process. They have a set budget to spend on everything (including the stag and hen nights) and only have three weeks to arrange the wedding. They are allowed no contact with the couple until a few days before the wedding and nothing is allowed to be revealed to the couple beforehand.

== Episodes ==
=== Series 1 (2012) ===
No. overall	No. in season	Title	Planner(s)	Couple	Original release date	Viewers (millions)
1	1	"Jedward"	Jedward	Beulah and James	6 January 2012	1.00
2	2	"Kerry Katona"	Kerry Katona	Stephanie and Nathan	13 January 2012	0.91
3	3	"The Apprentice Candidates"	Raef Bjayou and Stuart Baggs	Nicole and Luke	20 January 2012	1.07
4	4	"Josie Gibson"	Josie Gibson	Lindsey and Kevin	23 January 2012	Under 0.97

=== Series 2 (2012) ===
No. overall	No. in season	Title	Planner(s)	Couple	Original release date	Viewers (millions)
5	1	"Louie & Jake"	Louie Spence and Jake Canuso	Toni and Andy	20 August 2012	1.15
6	2	"Denise & Russell"	Denise Welch and Russell Grant	Stacy and Al	27 August 2012	0.95
7	3	"Neighbours Special"	Ryan Moloney and Mark Little	Gigi and Kap	3 September 2012	0.86

=== Series 3 (2013) ===
No. overall	No. in season	Title	Planner(s)	Couple	Original release date	Viewers (millions)
8	1	"EastEnders Special"	John Partridge and Nina Wadia	Jade and George	4 January 2013	0.91
9	2	"Celebrity Big Brother Special"	Martin Kemp and MC Harvey	Lisa and Mark	11 January 2013	0.98
10	3	"TOWIE Special"	Amy Childs and Harry Derbidge	Katie and Marvin	16 January 2013	1.05

=== Series 4 (2013–14) ===
No. overall	No. in season	Title	Planner(s)	Couple	Original release date	Viewers (millions)
11	1	"Pete & John"	Pete Burns and John McCririck	Astra and Anthony	11 October 2013	0.56
12	2	"Geordie Shore Special"	Gaz Beadle and Charlotte Crosby	Faye and Jodie	18 October 2013	TBA
13	3	"Helen & Hugo"	Helen Flanagan and Hugo Taylor	Rob and Emily	1 January 2014	TBA
