= Surrey Hills =

Surrey Hills may refer to:

- Surrey Hills National Landscape, a conservation area in Surrey, England
- Surrey Hills (TV series), a reality TV show
- Surry Hills, New South Wales, a suburb of Sydney, Australia
- Surrey Hills, Victoria, a suburb of Melbourne, Australia
  - Surrey Hills railway station, in Victoria, Australia
