= Celebrity Super Spa =

2013 British reality television series

- Genre: Fashion; Reality
- Presented by: Eoghan McDermott; Laura Jackson
- Starring: Herbert Howe
- Country of origin: United Kingdom
- Original language: English
- No. of series: 1
- No. of episodes: 6

Production
- Executive producers: Simon Marsh; Sumi Connock; Tony Moulsdale; Melanie Darlaston
- Producer: Barry Hart (series)
- Production location: Liverpool
- Running time: 60 minutes
- Production companies: ITV Studios and Motion Content Group

Original release
- Network: Channel 5
- Release: 13 September – 19 September 2013

Related
- Trust Me – I'm a Beauty Therapist

Celebrity Super Spa is a British reality television series that aired on Channel 5 from 13 to 19 September 2013. The show was produced by ITV Studios and Motion Content Group and centres on six celebrities working in a real-life Spa in Liverpool, where they are taught to pluck, preen and pamper by Herbert Howe, a man with fifty years experience in the hair and beauty industry.

The Voice of Ireland host Eoghan McDermott and Laura Jackson hosted the series; as confirmed on 15 July 2013.

== Format ==
Six celebrities work in a real-life Spa in Liverpool, where they are taught to pluck, preen and pamper by Herbert Howe, a man with fifty years experience in the hair and beauty industry. During their time working at the Spa, they are partnered with a real hair & beauty apprentice. Howe and his team of experts will judge the performances of each pair across the series, and in every episode he will decide on who performed the best, thus being his 'Salon Stars', and on who performed the worst in the day's masterclass. Each masterclass is based upon a different treatment, such as massaging, and usually involves real clientele. In the final episode, Howe and his team of experts take into account each pair's performance throughout the series, with the winning apprentice (as a part of the winning pair) receiving £10,000 and an apprenticeship.

== Celebrities ==
On 15 July 2013, the six celebrities to be featuring in the first series of the show were announced.

Celebrity	Known for
James "Arg" Argent	The Only Way Is Essex star
Helen Flanagan	Former Coronation Street actress
Jody Latham	Former Shameless actor
John Burton-Race	Celebrity chef
Rustie Lee	Celebrity chef
Yvette Fielding	Former Most Haunted star

== Apprentices ==
Name	Age	Hometown	Celebrity Pairing
Dil Barber	19	Cheshire	James "Arg" Argent
James Edwards	27	The Wirral	Jody Latham
Jennifer "Jeni" Wells	28	Liverpool	Rustie Lee
Megan	21	Manchester	Yvette Fielding
Sanchez Weaver	22	Liverpool	Helen Flanagan
Shani Lane	21	Cardiff	John Burton-Race

== Episodes ==
The first series began on Channel 5 on 13 September 2013 at 10pm; with subsequent episodes airing in the weeknight slot at 9pm from 16 to 19 September 2013. There were six sixty-minute episodes in the first series, however only five were broadcast on television due to poor ratings.

=== Episode 1 ===
- Broadcast date: 13 September 2013

The six celebrities met each other and were introduced to Herbert Howe, a man with over fifty years experience in the hair and beauty industry. Howe decided that each celebrity had to perform a consultation with a real-life client before they could begin working at the salon. Following these consultations, it was then revealed that these clients were apprentices themselves, all in training to work in the industry, and that they would be partnered with the celebrity who had consulted them. This meant that: Arg and Dil, Helen and Sanchez, Jody and James, John and Shani, Rustie and Jeni, and Yvette and Megan became partners. Furthermore, Howe explained that the winning apprentice (as a part of the winning pair) would leave the show with £10,000 and an apprenticeship. This put extra pressure on the celebrities.

On the second day, Helen's punctuality caused an argument with John, which forced her to tears. Later, in their respective pairs, they were given a masterclass in massaging which enabled them to demonstrate their new-found skills on real clientele; Howe judged Yvette and Megan to be this episode's 'Salon Stars' (best performers) and judged Arg and Dil to be this episode's worst performers. Arg & Dil were then told to clean up Howe's salon as punishment.

=== Episode 2 ===
- Broadcast date: 16 September 2013

The celebrities and trainees were given a masterclass in waxing technique. After practising on each other, they tackled their first real clients, a local rugby team, working against the clock to remove as much hair from the boys as they can.

The special challenge set by Herbert was intimate waxing.

=== Episode 3 ===
- This episode is an online exclusive and was not aired on TV.

The celebrity and trainee pairs were taught how to cut hair and then had a client each whose hair they had to cut.

The special task set by Herbert was hair art, where they were shown how to shave patterns into clients' hair. Each celebrity and trainee had to create their own design and shave it in to a client's hair.

=== Episode 4 ===
- Broadcast date: 17 September 2013

The celebrities and trainees were taught how to create the glamorous Liverpool look on male clients.

The special challenge set by Herbert was vajazzling and pejazzling clients, taught by Amy Childs. The celebrity and trainee pairs had to design their own vajazzle.

=== Episode 5 ===
- Broadcast date: 18 September 2013

The celebrities and trainees are taught how to give a manicure and pedicure and then practice on each other. Later, they are then given a spray tanning class, for which Helen volunteered to model. The celebrities and trainees then spray tan clients.

The special challenge set by Herbert, where the celebrities and trainees were split into two teams, Life's a Beach (spray tanning) and Hard As Nails (manicures), where they had to create and run their own pop-up shop in the salon. The team who made the most money would be the winners. All money raised was donated to charity.

=== Episode 6 ===
- Broadcast date: 19 September 2013

== Performance table ==
	Episode 1	Episode 2	Episode 3	Episode 4	Episode 5	Episode 6
Arg & Dil	Worst Performers	IN	Worst Performers	Worst Performers		
Helen & Sanchez	IN	Salon Stars	IN	Worst Performers		
Jody & James	IN	Worst Performers	IN	Salon Stars		
John & Shani	IN	IN	IN	Salon Stars		
Rustie & Jeni	IN	IN	Salon Stars	Salon Stars		
Yvette & Megan	Salon Stars	IN	IN	Worst Performers		
Notes				This was a team challenge		

== Ratings ==
Official episode viewing figures from BARB.

Episode no.	Airdate	Total UK viewers (millions)	Channel 5 weekly ranking
1	13 September 2013	1.31	10
2	16 September 2013	0.50	Outside Top 30
3	17 September 2013	Online Only	—N/a
4	17 September 2013	0.13	Outside Top 30
5	18 September 2013	0.97	13
6	19 September 2013	Under 0.64	Outside Top 30
