= I'm a Celebrity...Get Me Out of Here! (British TV series) series 12 =

I'm a Celebrity...Get Me Out of Here!
- Series 12
- Presented by: Anthony McPartlin; Declan Donnelly
- No. of days: 21
- No. of castaways: 12
- Winner: Charlie Brooks
- Runner-up: Ashley Roberts
- Companion show: I'm a Celebrity...Get Me Out of Here! NOW!
- No. of episodes: 19

Release
- Original network: ITV
- Original release: 11 November – 1 December 2012

Series chronology
- ← Previous; Series 11 Next → Series 13

I'm a Celebrity...Get Me Out of Here! returned for its twelfth series on 11 November 2012 and finished on 1 December 2012. Ant & Dec returned as main hosts, with Laura Whitmore and Joe Swash returning as hosts of spin-off show I'm a Celebrity...Get Me Out of Here! NOW!. On 16 June 2012, it was announced that Russell Kane would be leaving Get Me Out of Here! NOW!. He has been replaced by comedian Rob Beckett.

On 1 December 2012, the series was won by EastEnders actress Charlie Brooks, with Ashley Roberts and David Haye placed runner-up and third place respectively.

Helen Flanagan would return to the series 10 years later to participate in I'm a Celebrity... South Africa alongside other former contestants to try to become the first I'm a Celebrity legend. She finished joint 7th.

Ashley Roberts and David Haye returned 14 years later to participate in the second series of I'm a Celebrity... South Africa. Haye would be eliminated alongside series 14 contestant Gemma Collins finishing in 11th place. Roberts would finish in 7th place.

== Celebrities ==
Prior to the official announcement of any of the celebrity participants, Nadine Dorries, the UK Conservative Party MP for Mid Bedfordshire, was suspended from her party for failing to tell the Chief Whip she could be absent from the House of Commons and her constituents for a month as she was to appear on the reality TV show and heavily criticised for opting to take part. She is also to be investigated by the Parliamentary Standards Officer over claims she may have breached the MPs' Code of Conduct, with Theresa May, the Home Secretary, adding her concerns by saying it is "frankly" the job of MPs to be in their constituency and the House of Commons.

It has been revealed that boxer David Haye received an appearance fee of £165,000, which is about £100,000 more than the other contestants received. In addition to the higher appearance fee, Haye's contract stated that he must have access to a gym – which he was given.

The official line-up was announced on 7 November 2012.

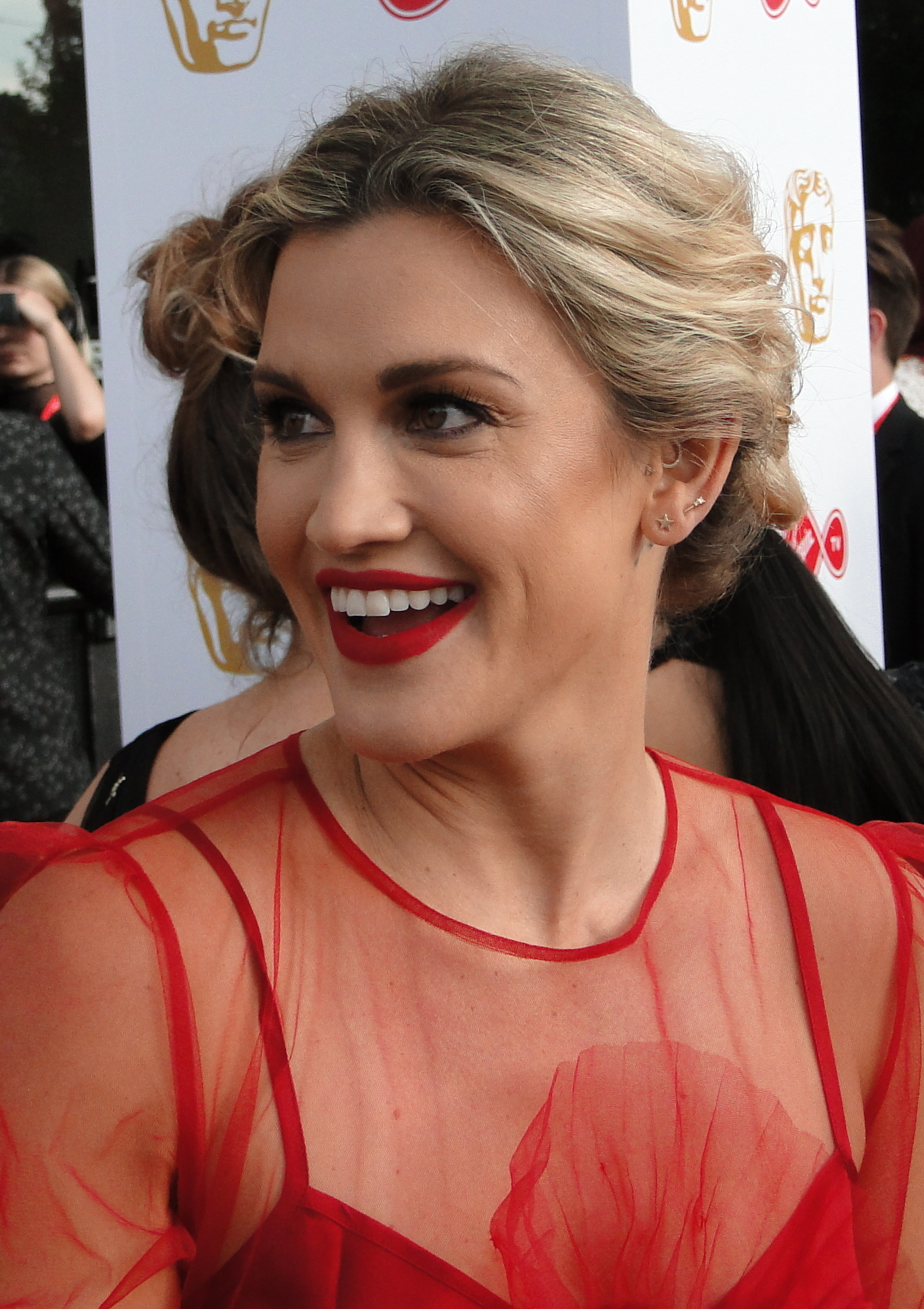
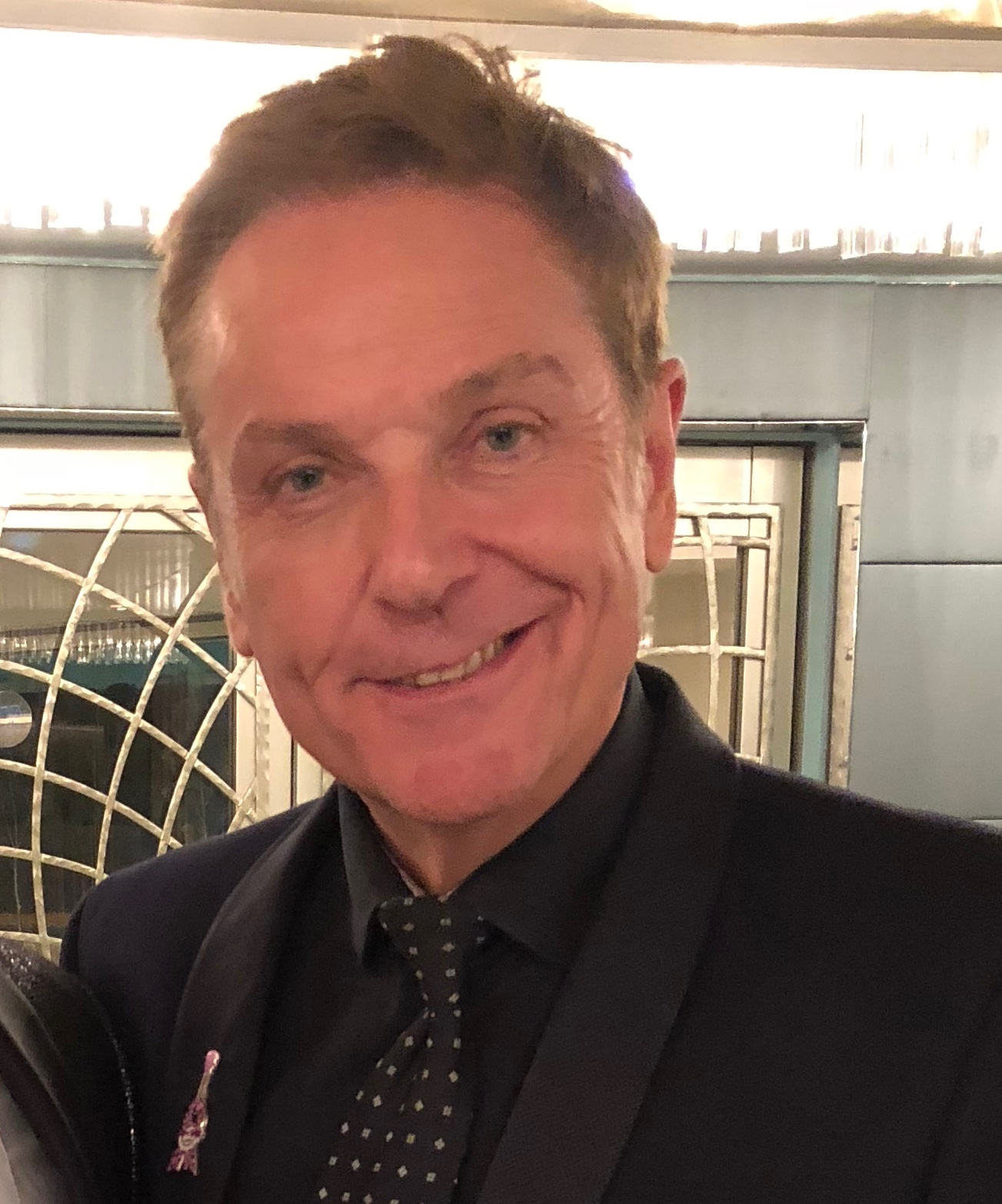
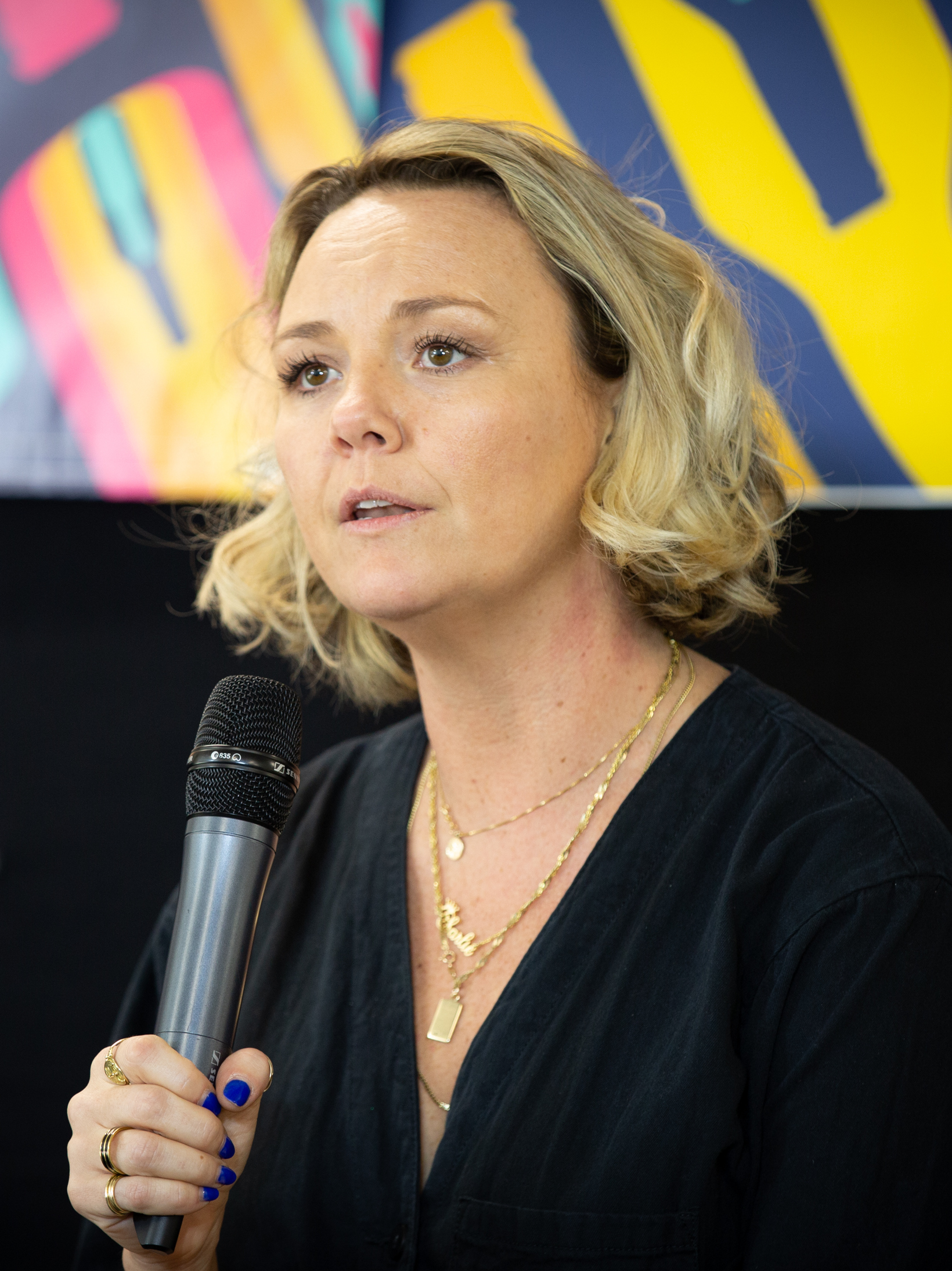
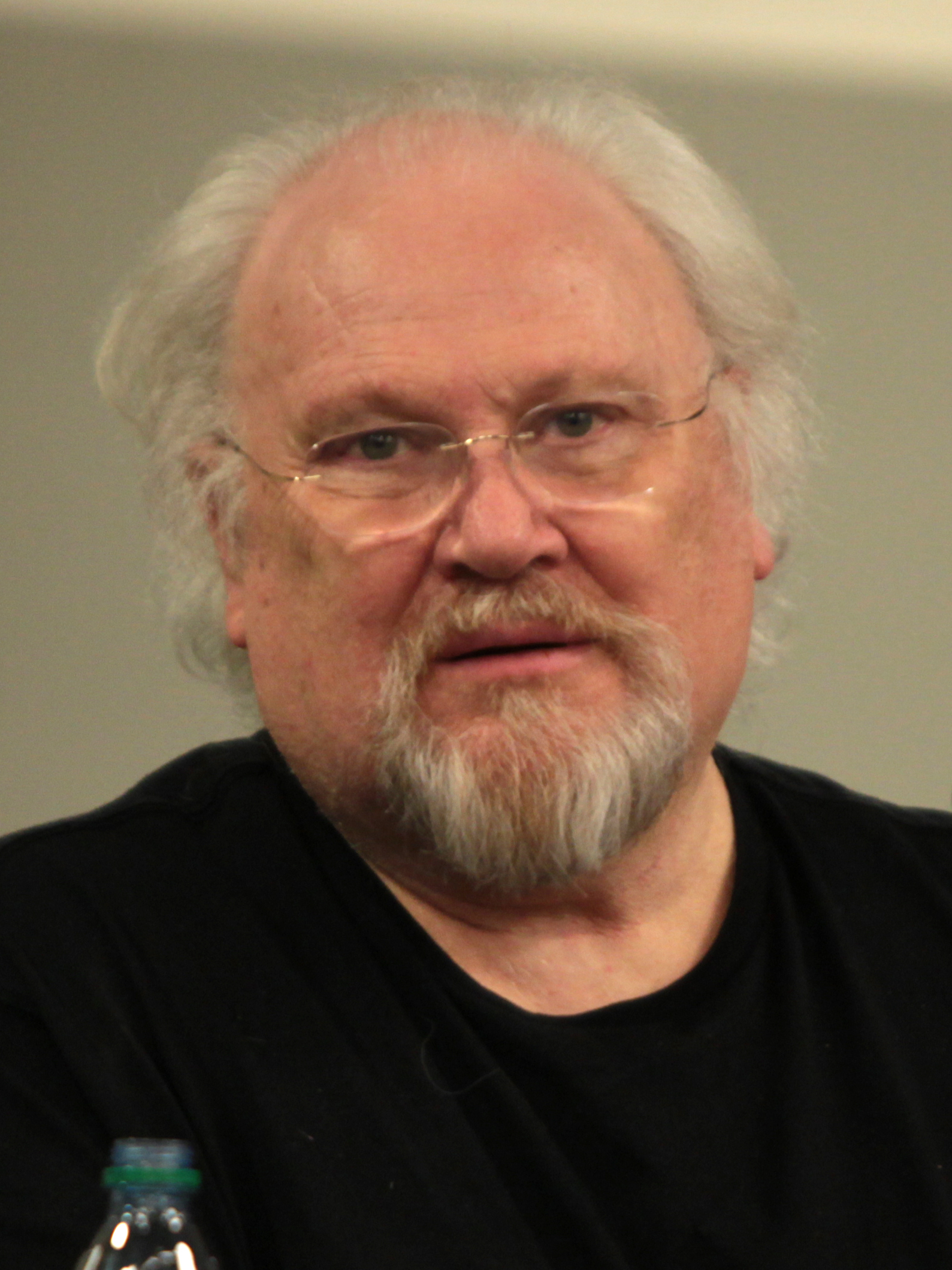
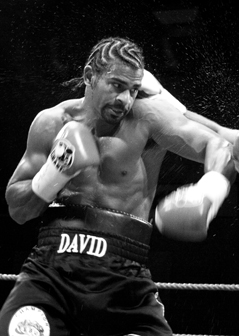
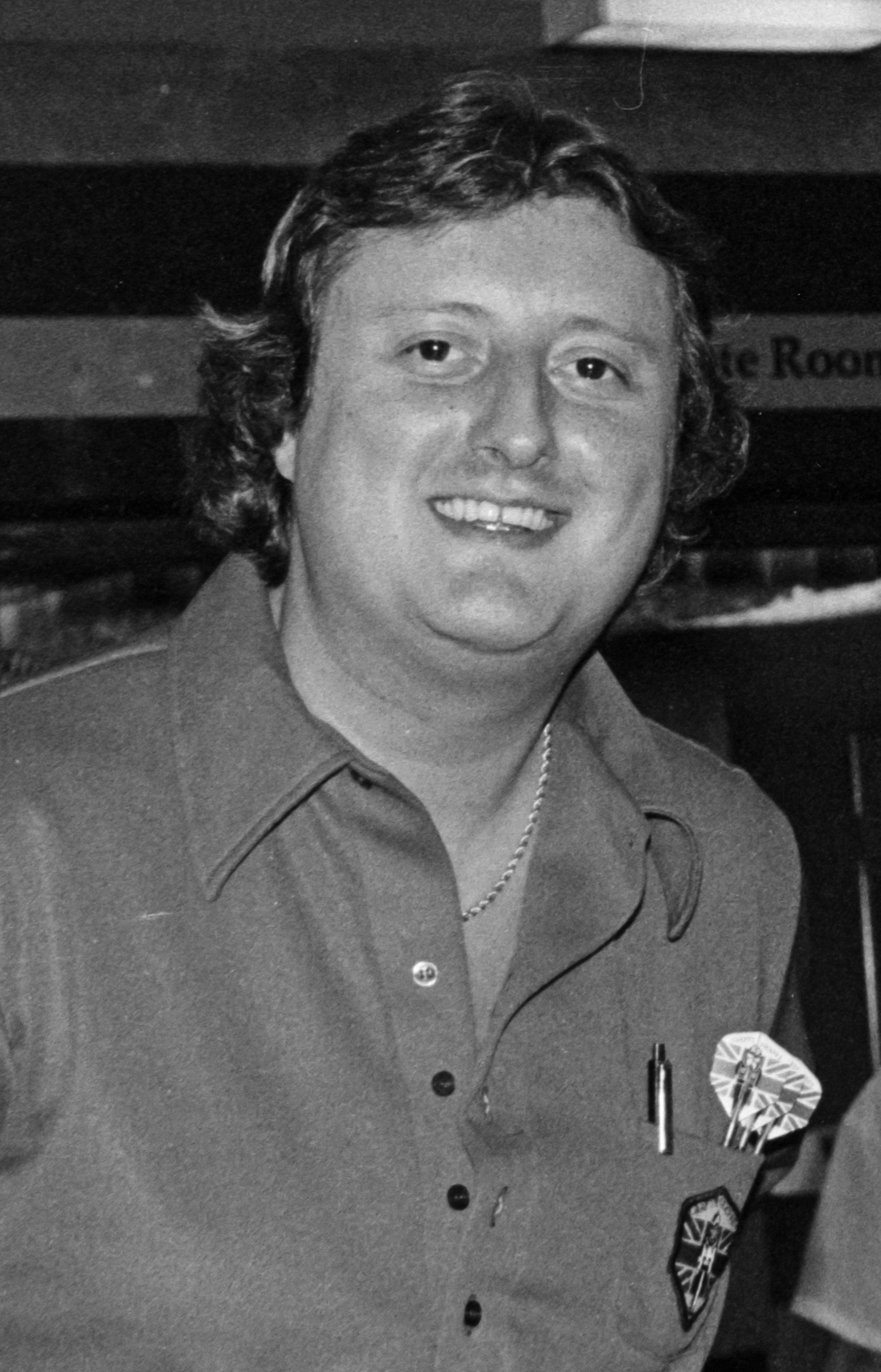
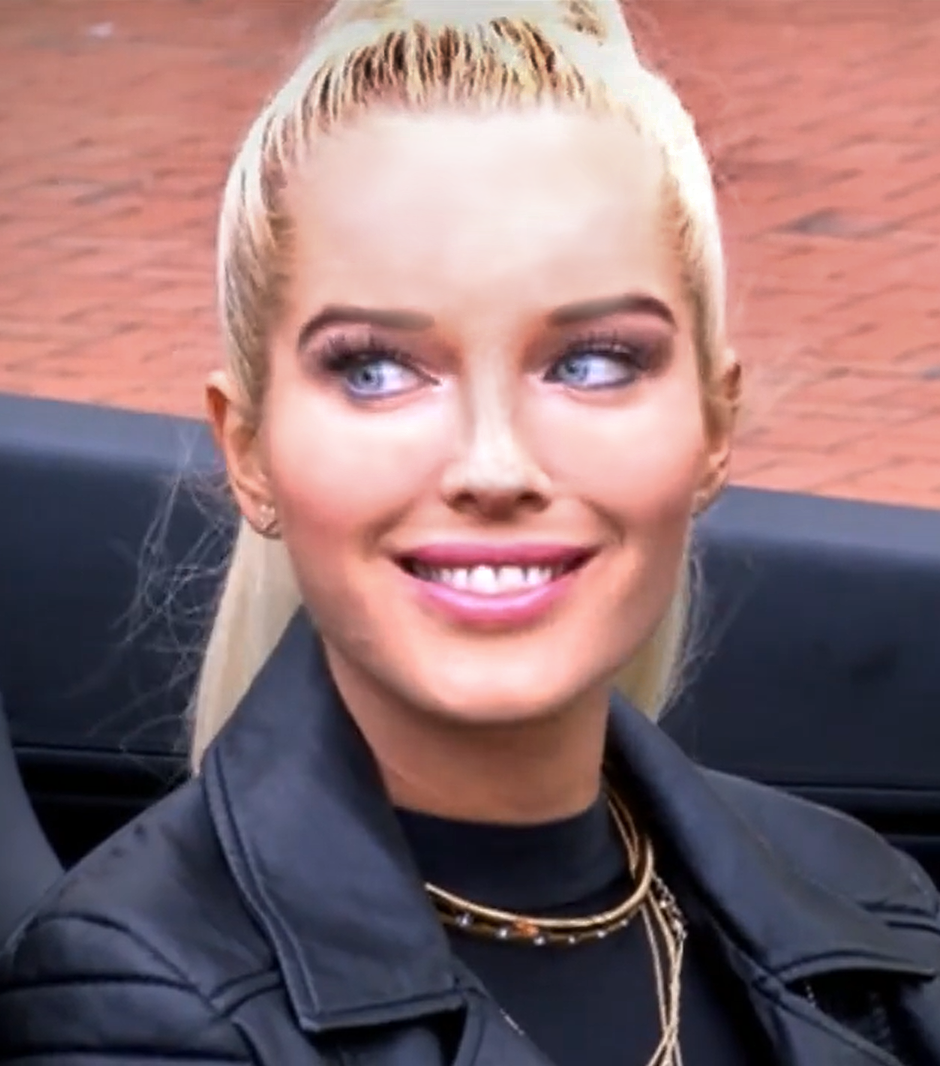
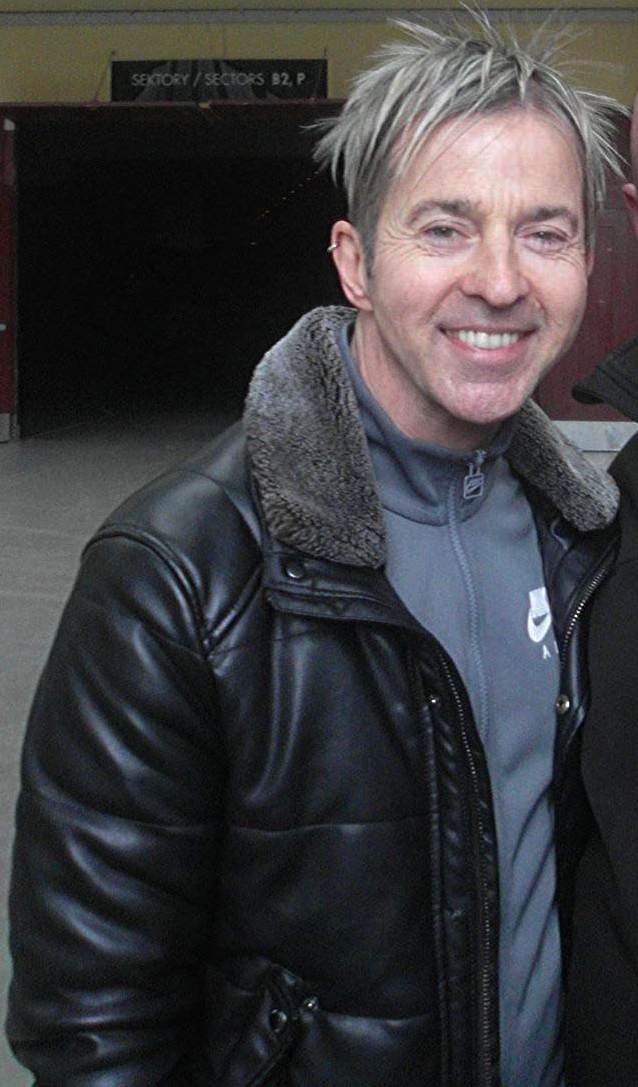
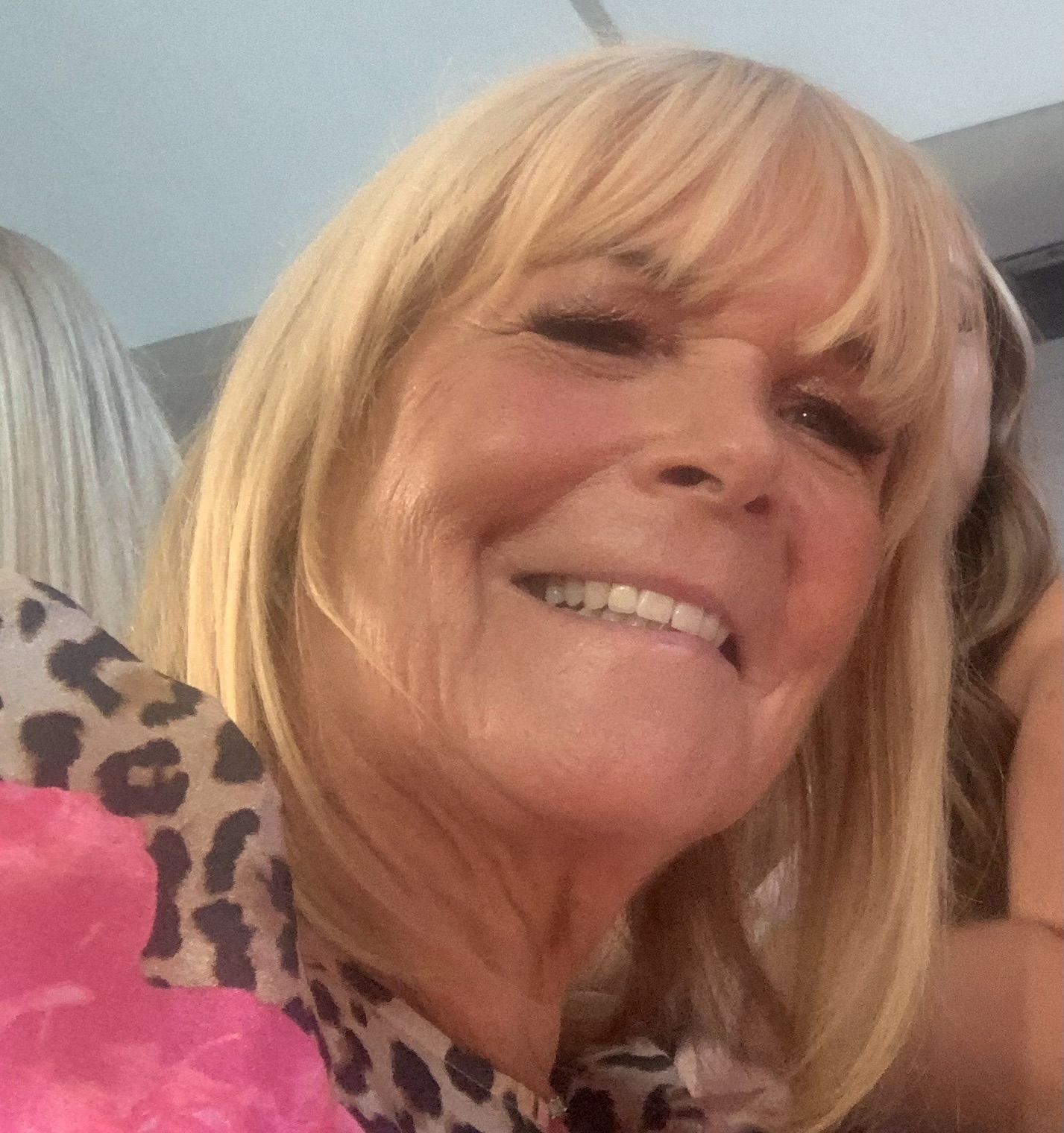
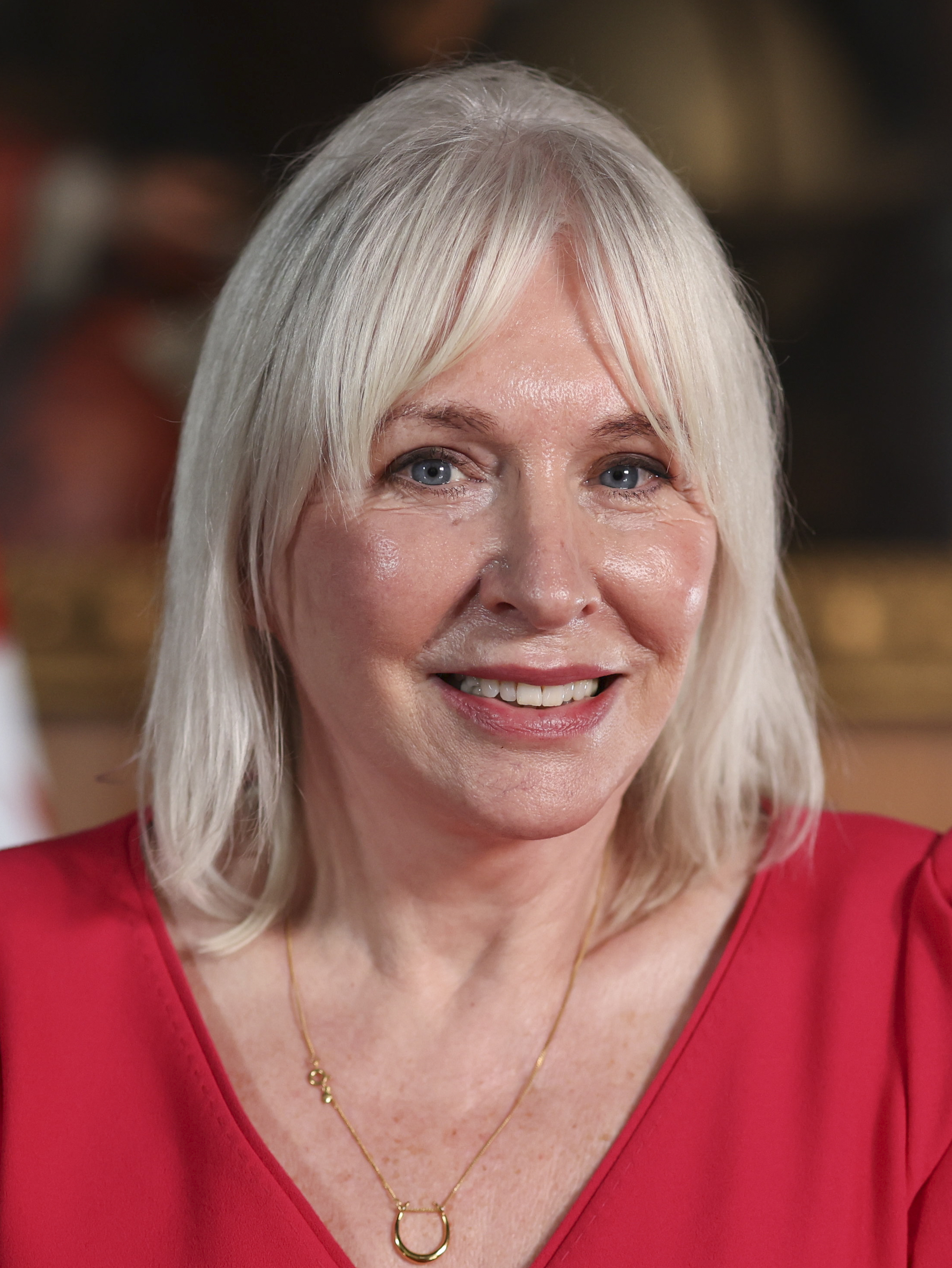
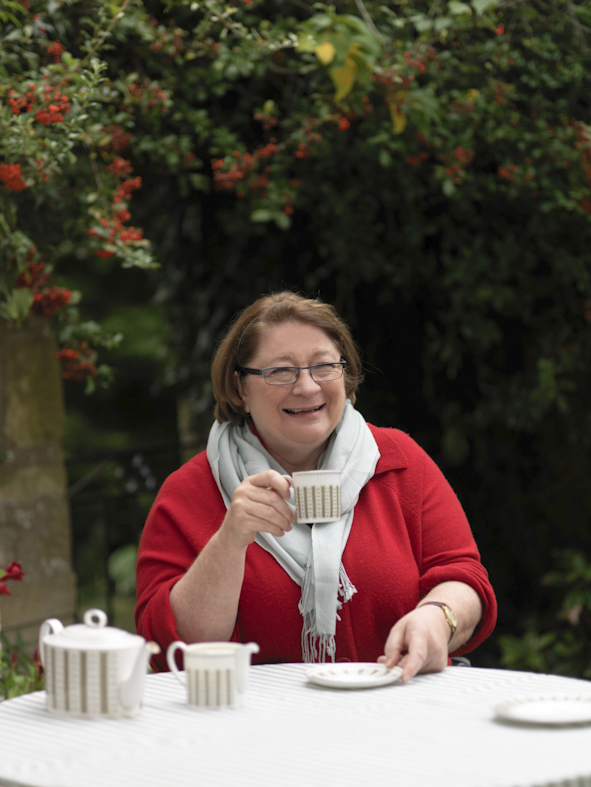
From left to right: Ashley Roberts, Brian Conley, Charlie Brooks, Colin Baker, David Haye, Eric Bristow, Helen Flanagan, Limahl, Linda Robson, Nadine Dorries and Rosemary Shrager.
Not pictured: Hugo Taylor.

| Celebrity | Known for | Status |
|---|---|---|
| Charlie Brooks | EastEnders actress | Winner on 1 December 2012 |
| Ashley Roberts | Former The Pussycat Dolls singer | Runner-up on 1 December 2012 |
| David Haye | Professional boxer | Eliminated 9th on 30 November 2012 |
| Eric Bristow | Professional darts player | Eliminated 8th on 29 November 2012 |
| Hugo Taylor | Made in Chelsea star | Eliminated 7th on 28 November 2012 |
| Rosemary Shrager | Celebrity chef | Eliminated 6th on 27 November 2012 |
| Helen Flanagan | Former Coronation Street actress | Eliminated 5th on 26 November 2012 |
| Colin Baker | Former Doctor Who actor | Eliminated 4th on 25 November 2012 |
| Linda Robson | Birds of a Feather actress & Loose Women panellist | Eliminated 3rd on 23 November 2012 |
| Limahl | Kajagoogoo singer | Eliminated 2nd on 22 November 2012 |
| Nadine Dorries | Conservative Party politician | Eliminated 1st on 21 November 2012 |
| Brian Conley | Actor, singer, & comedian | Withdrew on 19 November 2012 |

== Results and elimination ==
Indicates that the celebrity was immune from the vote
Indicates that the celebrity received the most votes from the public
Indicates that the celebrity received the fewest votes and was eliminated immediately (no bottom two)
Indicates that the celebrity was named as being in the bottom two
Indicates that the celebrity received the second fewest votes and was not named in the bottom two

Daily results per celebrity
| | Day 11 | Day 12 | Day 13 | Day 15 | Day 16 | Day 17 | Day 18 | Day 19 | Day 20 | Day 21 Final | Trials | Dingo Dollar challenges |
|---|---|---|---|---|---|---|---|---|---|---|---|---|
| Charlie | 1st 28.01% | 3rd 14.38% | 1st 15.25% | 2nd 15.78% | 5th 13.54% | 5th 15.33% | 2nd 25.93% | 3rd 24.31% | 2nd 32.17% | Winner; 50.56% | 5 | 2 |
| Ashley | Immune | 2nd 16.24% | 3rd 13.82% | 3rd 14.72% | 1st 20.00% | 1st 21.39% | 1st 27.88% | 1st 33.87% | 1st 40.57% | Runner-up; 49.44% | 4 | 3 |
| David | 2nd 22.78% | 4th 13.51% | 5th 12.46% | 1st 17.63% | 3rd 13.82% | 3rd 15.97% | 3rd 17.79% | 2nd 25.30% | 3rd 27.26% | Eliminated (Day 20) | 5 | 2 |
| Eric | 5th 10.94% | 6th 9.79% | 6th 12.01% | 7th 9.54% | 2nd 15.92% | 4th 15.67% | 4th 14.79% | 4th 16.53% | Eliminated (Day 19) | | 3 | 3 |
| Hugo | Immune | 8th 5.98% | 7th 9.30% | 4th 14.42% | 6th 11.86% | 2nd 16.81% | 5th 13.61% | Eliminated (Day 18) | | | 3 | 4 |
| Rosemary | Immune | 5th 10.33% | 2nd 15.19% | 6th 10.33% | 4th 13.81% | 6th 14.83% | Eliminated (Day 17) | | | | 1 | 2 |
| Helen | 3rd 20.15% | 1st 18.43% | 4th 13.20% | 5th 11.70% | 7th 11.06% | Eliminated (Day 16) | | | | | 7 | 3 |
| Colin | 4th 13.32% | 7th 6.42% | 8th 5.39% | 8th 5.88% | Eliminated (Day 15) | | | | | | 1 | 1 |
| Linda | Immune | 9th 2.66% | 9th 3.37% | Eliminated (Day 13) | | | | | | | 0 | 1 |
| Limahl | Immune | 10th 2.24% | Eliminated (Day 12) | | | | | | | | 0 | 0 |
| Nadine | 6th 4.79% | Eliminated (Day 11) | | | | | | | | | 2 | 0 |
| Brian | Withdrew (Day 9) | | | | | | | | | | 0 | 1 |
| Notes | 1 | None | | 2 | None | | | | | 3 | | |
| Bottom two (named in) | Eric, Nadine | Hugo, Limahl | David, Linda | Colin, Eric | Helen, Hugo | Eric, Rosemary | David, Hugo | Charlie, Eric | None | | | |
| Eliminated | Nadine; 4.79% to save | Limahl; 2.24% to save | Linda; 3.37% to save | Colin; Lost trial | Helen; 11.06% to save | Rosemary; 14.83% to save | Hugo; 13.61% to save | Eric; 16.53% to save | David; 27.26% to save | Ashley; 49.44% to win | | |
| Eliminated | Nadine; 4.79% to save | Limahl; 2.24% to save | Linda; 3.37% to save | Colin; Lost trial | Helen; 11.06% to save | Rosemary; 14.83% to save | Hugo; 13.61% to save | Eric; 16.53% to save | David; 27.26% to save | Charlie; 50.56% to win | | |

=== Notes ===
N.B. Bottom two is not a strict indication of the public vote as names are generally revealed "in no particular order".
^1 In order to win immunity from the first public vote all celebrities took part in a task called "Bush Buddies". They will then take part in a 'Bed Bugs' task, in which the first five who accumulate the most time in the beds will be given immunity, while the other six will face the public vote.
^2 All of the celebrities faced the public vote; the bottom two were revealed as Eric and Colin. The other celebrities were declared safe and on Day 17 both Eric and Colin faced a bushtucker trial called "The Panic Rooms". Eric won the trial, while Colin was sent home.
^3 The public were voting for the celebrity they wanted to win rather than to save.

== Bushtucker trials ==
The contestants take part in daily trials to earn food

The public voted for who they wanted to face the trial
The contestants decided who did which trial
The trial was compulsory and neither the public or celebrities decided who took part

| Trial number | Air Date | Name of trial | Celebrity participation | Public vote % | Winner/Number of stars | Notes |
|---|---|---|---|---|---|---|
| 1 | 11 November | Special Delivery | David; Hugo | —N/a | David | 1 |
| 2 | 12 November | Bug Burial | Helen; Nadine | 53.32% 58.68% | None | 2 |
| 3 | 13 November | Rotten Rhymes | Helen; Nadine | 63.12% 59.29% | Nadine | 3 |
| 4 | 15 November | Cruelty Towers | Helen | 26.95% | 0/10 stars | None |
| 5 | 16 November | Come Dive With Me | Helen; Charlie | 26.34% 21.70% | 0/6 stars 3/6 stars | 4 |
| 6 | 17 November | Rodent Run | Helen | 29.20% | 0/12 stars | 5 |
| 7 | 18 November | Deadly Delivery | Helen | 46.07% | 12/12 stars | None |
| 8 (Live) | 18 November | Bad Day at the Office | Helen | 28.56% | 5/12 stars | None |
| 9 | 21 November | Savage Sewer | Hugo | 31.30% | 9/11 stars | 6 |
| 10 | 22 November | Terror Train | Ashley | —N/a | 8/10 stars | None |
| 11 | 23 November | Scare Plane | David | —N/a | 9/9 stars | None |
| 12 | 24 November | Drown and Out | Hugo | —N/a | 8/8 stars | None |
| 13 | 25 November | The Panic Rooms | Colin | 5.88% | 1/4 stars | 7 |
| 13 | 25 November | The Panic Rooms | Charlie | —N/a | 1/4 stars | 7 |
| 13 | 25 November | The Panic Rooms | Eric | 9.54% | 4/4 stars | 7 |
| 13 | 25 November | The Panic Rooms | Rosemary | —N/a | 4/4 stars | 7 |
| 14 | 26 November | Cruelty Towers | David | —N/a | 6/7 stars | 8 |
| 15 | 27 November | The Great Escape | Eric | —N/a | 5/6 stars | None |
| 16 | 28 November | Jungle Walk of Shame | Ashley; Charlie | —N/a | 4/5 stars | None |
| 17 | 29 November | Celebrity Cyclone | Ashley; Charlie; David; Eric | —N/a | 4/4 stars | None |
| 18 | 30 November | Well of Hell | David | —N/a | 3/3 stars | None |
| 19 | 1 December | Final Feast | Ashley; Charlie | —N/a | 4/4 stars | None |

=== Notes ===
^1 The celebrities were separated into two teams, based on how they travelled into the jungle. The winning team would stay in 'Croc Creek', the more luxurious of the two camps in the jungle. The losing team would move into the 'Snake Rock'.
^2 Both Helen and Nadine quit the trial, therefore neither were rewarded the food for their camps.
^3 Nadine won by eating four meals. Therefore, she won four meals for her camp.
^4 Helen originally won four stars, but they were disallowed as she grabbed them with her hands instead of her mouth.
^5 After the klaxon sounded, Helen stepped off the wheel and refused to do the trial. This marks the third time in I'm a Celebrity history that a contestant has refused to do a trial, after Kerry Katona in series 3 and Gillian McKeith in series 10 which Ant and Dec allowed.
^6 Colin and Rosemary were excluded from this trial on medical grounds.
^7 This trial decided who left the camp between Eric and Colin and how the camp would be fed that night. Charlie took part with Colin, and Rosemary with Eric. Each celebrity had to collect as many stars as they can to stay in camp, it was then revealed on Day 17 that Colin had collected fewer stars than Eric, so had to leave the jungle.
^8 This trial was originally attempted by Helen, but as she quit the trial, it was decided for it to be re-attempted by David.

== Star count ==
| Celebrity | Number of Stars Earned | Percentage |
|---|---|---|
| Charlie Brooks | 19/23 stars | 83% |
| Ashley Roberts | 20/23 stars | 87% |
| David Haye | 22/23 stars | 96% |
| Eric Bristow | 10/14 stars | 71% |
| Hugo Taylor | 17/19 stars | 89% |
| Rosemary Shrager | 1/4 stars | 25% |
| Helen Flanagan | 17/52 stars | 33% |
| Colin Baker | 4/4 stars | 100% |
| Linda Robson | —N/a | —N/a |
| Limahl | —N/a | —N/a |
| Nadine Dorries | —N/a | —N/a |
| Brian Conley | —N/a | —N/a |

== Dingo Dollar challenges ==
This series, the 'Celebrity Chest' games have been replaced with the 'Dingo Dollar Challenges'. In a similar style to the celebrity chest, one member from each camp (Croc Creek and Snake Rock) will go head-to-head to win the 'Dingo Dollars'. The winning celebrity can then take the dollars to the 'Outback Shack', where they can exchange them for camp luxuries with kiosk Keith. Two options are given and the celebrity can choose which they'd would like to win. However, to win their luxury, a question is asked to the celebrities still in camp via the telephone box. If the question is answered correctly, the celebrity who won the challenge can take the items back to camp. If wrong, they receive nothing.

The celebrities got the question correct
The celebrities got the question wrong

Bold indicates that the celebrity won the challenge

| Episode | Air Date | Celebrities | Prizes available | Prize chosen |
|---|---|---|---|---|
| 2 | 12 November | **Brian**; Eric | Hammocks; Chocolate brownies | Hammocks |
| 3 | 13 November | **David**; Hugo | Crisps; Toilet seat covers and air fresheners | Crisps |
| 4 | 15 November | Ashley; Charlie | Digestive biscuits Camping chair | Digestive biscuits |
| 5 | 16 November | Colin; Linda | Pool inflatables Ice cream | Ice cream |
| 10 | 22 November | Eric; Hugo | Anti-snoring pads Ice lollies | Ice lollies |
| 11 | 23 November | Charlie; Helen | Popcorn; Face masks | Popcorn |
| 13 | 25 November | Helen; Rosemary | Lemonade; Chocolate-coated strawberries | Chocolate-coated strawberries |
| 14 | 26 November | Ashley; Helen | Salt and pepper Chinese meal | Salt and pepper |
| 15 | 27 November | Hugo; Rosemary | Manicure kit Marshmallows | Marshmallows |
| 16 | 28 November | David; Hugo | Three songs of choice Toast with jam and butter | Three songs of choice |
| 17 | 29 November | Eric; Ashley | Baked beans Corned beef | Corned beef |

== Bush Buddy challenges ==
On the seventh day of the show, the celebrities were split into six pairs for the Bush Buddy Challenges, these were; Ashley and Hugo, Brian and David, Charlie and Linda, Colin and Rosemary, Eric and Nadine, Helen and Limahl. The celebrities were chained to their buddies and not allowed to be more than 4 ft away from each other.

Bold indicates which celebrity of the winning pair took part.

| Episode | Air Date | Winners | Prize | Description |
|---|---|---|---|---|
| **7** | 18 November | Helen & **Limahl** | A nights sleep in the "Jungle Den". | Colin, Limahl, Eric, Charlie, Ashley and David had to stand in a box filled with cockroaches while trying to rearrange cubes to make a life size picture of their 'buddy'. Each time someone completed the task, the other challengers were given an electric shock. |
| **8** | 19 November | **David** | A nights sleep in the "Jungle Den". | Rosemary, Helen, Nadine, Hugo and David had to sit inside a box using a magnet against the window panel to manoeuvre ten coloured magnets through a grid into hatch. Once again each time someone completed the task, the other challengers were given an electric shock. |
| **9** | 20 November | **Ashley, Hugo, Linda, Rosemary, Limahl** | Immunity. | All celebrities faced the 'Bed Bugs' trial to win immunity. Celebrities got different amounts of time added to their score based on how them (and their buddy) had done in the previous two tasks. |

- David had to compete in both challenges as his partner Brian withdrew from the jungle for medical reasons in the morning of day 9.

== The camps ==
For the first four days of the show, the celebrities were split between two separate camps known as "Croc Creek" and "Snake Rock".

The two camps merged in the early hours of Day 5, with the residents of Snake Rock relocating to the larger Croc Creek camp.

Rosemary and Limahl joined the camp on Day 5.

== Episodes ==
=== Week 1 ===
| No. | Title | Original release date | Duration |
|---|---|---|---|
| 1 | "Episode 1" | 11 November 2012 | 90 minutes |
It's the start of the new series. Ant and Dec were on hand as the celebrities make their way into camp. The celebrities were split into their two camps – Croc Creek and Snake Rock. To start, the two teams were set the challenge to trek through the Australian forests and beaches to reach a helicopter – with the winning camp getting a night of luxury, while the others a night of horror. The team that won were Croc Creek. Then Dec and Ant announced the first Bushtucker Trial – Special Delivery, in which a celebrity from each team had to search for stars in a parcel shaped box by putting their hands into different compartments. David Haye won the trial against Hugo Taylor. The rest of the celebrities, not facing the trial, also had to make their way into camp. Croc Creek had to travel across a bridge with 'bits meeting' over a huge open space, while Snake Rock had to canoe along the river in quick time. All celebrities made it to the camp, although Helen Flanagan (Croc Creek) struggled due to her fear of heights. Hugo also raised some attention, quoting "I would expect my MP to be doing her job; not coming into the jungle". This was an issue that had been widely talked about in the press. At the end of the episode, Dec and Ant announced facing the next trial, Bug Burial, would be Nadine for Snake Rock and Helen for Croc Creek.
| 2 | "Episode 2" | 12 November 2012 | 60 minutes |
Ant and Dec returned as the celebrities started to 'get to grips' with jungle life. It had now been 48 hours of jungle life for the celebrities and the cracks were starting to show. It was time for Helen (Croc Creek) and Nadine (Snake Rock) to face the first public voted bushtucker trial – Bug Burial. The trial entailed surviving 10 minutes underground with jungle creatures in a locked coffin, before escaping to win food. Helen managed only 5 seconds and therefore did not gain food for Croc Creek. While lasting longer, Nadine only managed four minutes and therefore also gained no food for Snake Rock – meaning both camps were going to have to survive on basic rations of rice and beans for the next 24 hours. It was then time for a change to the celebrity chest challenge (the same format but now was named 'Dingo Dollar Challenges'. This challenge was between Brian (Croc Creek) and Eric (Snake Rock). Both celebrities had to stand on a lilypad afloat in the middle of a river and try and catch tennis balls which were shot at them with a net. Brian won the challenge and Crock Creek got the question right – and won five hammocks as their treat. As the night drew in, with only basic rations, tensions grew in both camps as the realization of how hard the jungle is was starting to set in. Ant and Dec then went into camp to reveal who the public had voted to face the next Bushtucker trial – Rotten Rhymes. It was announced that Helen was facing the trial for Croc Creek and Nadine for Snake Rock.
| 3 | "Episode 3" | 13 November 2012 | 60 minutes |
Ant and Dec hosted the latest action from the jungle. Helen and Nadine go head-to-head in the latest bushtucker trial – Rotten Rhymes. For the first time, the two celebrities that did the first trial were voted to do another. The trial involved eating a selection of 'jungle foods'. Nadine managed to get four star, whereas Helen managed only three. Though she had lost, Helen felt pleased, as this was a vast improvement on the previous trial. Snake Rock were very pleased with Nadine's victory. When they returned, David and Hugo did the Dingo Dollar Challenge. This challenge involved placing blocks in a wall and then climbing up the wall, to win the challenge. David won and asked for crisps (over a toilet seat and air freshener). However, the celebrities incorrectly answered the question, so won nothing. The celebrities then found out that both camps were going to have to merge into Croc Creek. When they merged, there was mixed feelings at first, but then all the celebrities started to get along. Ant and Dec then announced that the celebrity facing the next trial – Cruelty Towers – would be Helen.
| 4 | "Episode 4" | 15 November 2012 | 90 minutes |
Ant and Dec presented the latest action from the jungle. It was time for Helen to face the latest bushtucker trial – Cruelty Towers. This task consisted of going through rooms in hotels (containing creatures) to find stars. Helen struggled to build herself up to start the task. When she started the task, she managed to only enter one room before shouting "I'm a Celebrity, get me out of here!" and lost the one star she had collected, therefore going back to camp having collected no meals. It was then time for Charlie and Ashley to face the latest Dingo Dollar Challenge, which was an exploration task through the jungle. They completed the task and the camp got the question right – winning biscuits. The camp then faced another task for food (as there had been a two-day gap between one episode and another). For this, they had to try to break a series of actual world records within the camp. They completed 6 out of 10 tasks and therefore gained six meals for camp. Laura and Joe then announced that two new arrivals were making their way into camp – Limahl, a 1980s pop star, and Rosemary Shrager, a television chef. However, the two new arrivals found out that, instead of heading straight to camp, they had to face a bushtucker trial – staying in the 'Huntsman's Lodge', a room filled with jungle creatures, for the whole night. Meanwhile, the celebrities in the camp were given the choice of either forgoing all the meals won in the World Record Challenge or keeping the meals, but making the other two's night much harder. They made a joint decision to keep the meals as they were the first they had had in a while and more bugs and rats filled the Huntsman's Lodge. Shrager and Limahl were given the choice of saying "I'm a Celebrity, get me out of here.", which thus ends the challenge, but if they survived the whole night, they would return to camp with tea, coffee and biscuits for everybody. After it was decided to stay, they braced themselves for the long night ahead. They had managed till midnight and it was said the rest of the trial would be seen in the next episode. At the end, Ant and Dec announced the two celebrities facing the next trial – Come Dive with Me – would be Charlie and Helen.
| 5 | "Episode 5" | 16 November 2012 | 60 minutes |
Helen and Charlie both took part in the trial "Come Dive With Me". This involved them going underwater with a crocodile and putting the heads in domes, full of water creatures and collecting stars in their mouth. Charlie collected three out of six stars and Helen collected zero (Helen collected four stars but used her hands instead of her mouth – and thus the stars were disqualified). Rosemany and Limahl joined the camp, with some Tea and Biscuits. Linda and Colin took part in the "Dingo Dollar Challenge". Where they had to count a number of different coloured pins and then had to times, divide, add and subtract the numbers to get their overall answer. They won 100 Dingo Dollars and won Ice Cream as the other 10 contestants got the question (when was "Birds of a Feather" first broadcast?) correct. After being late to join the camp, Rosemary and Limahl slept in the "Jungle Den" in the camp, where they could only use the stairs to get up and the slide to get down. The celebrities got Morton Bay Bugs for their dinner and everyone listened to Rosemary's snores later on. At the end, Ant and Dec announced that the next trial – Rodent Run – would be faced by Helen.
| 6 | "Episode 6" | 17 November 2012 | 60 minutes |
Ant and Dec presented the latest jungle action. They say how Helen 'didn't do well' in the trial. The trial was then shown. As Helen was about to start, she got in the trial area and couldn't decide whether to even start the trial or not. After much encouraging from Ant, Dec and the crew, she decided to try, but immediately stopped and bailed out as soon as the klaxon sounded, therefore winning no meals for camp. There was also a talent show, with Rosemary and Limahl as the judges. The celebrities were paired up and each given a talent and the top four pairs would go to the jungle pub. Colin and Eric had rap, Charlie and David had song, Hugo and Helen had poetry, Ashley and Brian had expressive dance and Linda and Nadine had comedy. Linda and Nadine were the only pair not to go to the pub, but they didn't mind too much. At the end, it was announced that the next trial would be faced again by Helen.

=== Week 2 ===
| No. | Title | Original release date | Duration |
|---|---|---|---|
| 7 | "Episode 7" | 18 November 2012 | 90 minutes |
Helen is under a lot of pressure to get stars for camp, who are slowly starving. In this trial (named 'Deadly Delivery'), Helen had to put her head in a box full of different things and do a maze beneath her to move across to the other side, where she finished. Unlike her efforts in the previous trials, Helen did well and manages to gain twelve out of a possible twelve stars. She and her camp were overwhelmed and overjoyed with her efforts. Colin also announced that in four days, someone would leave the jungle and that everyone would partner up with their 'jungle buddy' and compete in challenges to win a night in the jungle den and the final challenge would be everyone doing 'bed bugs'. Ashley paired up with Hugo, Brian with David, Charlie with Linda, Colin with Rosemary, Eric with Nadine and Helen with Limahl. One of all the pairs were sent off to do a challenge, in which they had to make their partner out of blocks. Limahl won and was clearly astounded by this. It was also announced that despite her efforts, Helen would do the live trial. In the live trial (named 'Bad Day at the Office'), Helen would have to do various office things, such as photocopy her face (with the photocopier full of cockroaches) and get treats from the animal infested vending machine. She only managed to get five out of twelve stars, but was still happy.
| 8 | "Episode 8" | 19 November 2012 | 60 minutes |
Ant and Dec hosted the latest action from the jungle. They announced that Brian had left the jungle on medical grounds. There was no trial today after the live one the day before, however the camp mates reaction to Helen's trial was shown. Overall, the camp members seemed positive about Helen's efforts during the trial. The other half of each buddy had to complete the next buddy challenge. David had to do it again, after his partner (Brian) was unwell. This challenge included being stuck in a container full of flies having to complete tasks with magnets. David won the challenge and therefore got to spend the night in the jungle den. At the end, Ant and Dec announced facing the next bushtucker trial, Savage Sewer, would be Hugo. They also announced that all the celebrities would be facing the eviction challenge – Bed Bugs.
| 9 | "Episode 9" | 21 November 2012 | 90 minutes |
Ant and Dec hosted all the latest action from the jungle. Hugo faced the latest trial, Savage Sewer. In this trial, Hugo had to go into a sewer (filled with various animals) to obtain stars. He got nine out of a possible eleven, which he was pleased with. All the celebrities face the eviction challenge – Bed Bugs. This trial (also done last year) involved trying to spend a whole night in a glass coffin. There was time added to each pair for the challenges as well, with 60 minutes being added to one pairs time and zero minutes being added to two pairs time. Though with no challenge bonus, Rosemary lasted the longest, lasting nearly three hours, but unlike last year, no-one stayed the whole night in the coffin. It was announced that the top five (immune) celebrities were Limahl, Hugo, Rosemary, Ashley and Linda, which meant Charlie, Colin, David, Eric, Helen and Nadine, were facing the vote-off. There was also a challenge involving bells, in which each celebrity had a bell to ring in a certain order of a song. If they guessed correctly, they would win a meal. Though the first three went well, it all broke out as an argument, after Limahl was using musical terms no-one understood and no-one (including Limahl) played their bell at the right time. In the end, Eric and Nadine (jungle buddies) were announced as the bottom two and it was then announced that Nadine would leave the jungle.
| 10 | "Episode 10" | 22 November 2012 | 90 minutes |
Ant and Dec hosted the latest action. For the first time this series, the celebrities decided who wanted to do the trial. They chose Ashley. The trial consisted of getting stars from various parts of a train, filled with different animals and fish guts. She got eight out of a possible ten stars and was overjoyed. The 'Dingo Dollars Challenge' also returned. Eric and Hugo took part and the challenge was to listen to various vinyl records and hear a number at the end which would open a lock. They won and chose the prize of ice lollies. The celebrities answered the question correctly and won the prize. The celebrities also did a challenge, involving answering general knowledge questions to get a certain number of minutes of a phone call to someone. They won three minutes and chose to give the call to Ashley. In the end, Hugo and Limahl were announced as the bottom two and it was then announced that Limahl would leave the jungle.
| 11 | "Episode 11" | 23 November 2012 | 90 minutes |
Ant and Dec hosted the latest action. The celebrities decided who they wanted to do the trial, and they chose David, as they thought he could get the most stars. This upset Charlie, as she had not done as many trials as David, and thought 'picking David because he could get more stars' was being sexist. The trial was to get into a plane and fly to other planes, collecting stars from the wings and in the air. As everyone expected, David got nine out of nine stars, and was pleased. The 'Dingo Dollars Challenge' this time was faced by Helen and Charlie. They had to pump a balloon in a plastic frogs mouth until it exploded. They quickly got exhausted, and resorted to throwing rocks at the balloon. They won the challenge, and chose popcorn as their prize (over face masks). However, the celebrities answered the question incorrectly, so won nothing. In the end, David and Linda were announced as the bottom two and it was then announced that Linda would leave the jungle.
| 12 | "Episode 12" | 24 November 2012 | 60 minutes |
Ant and Dec hosted the latest action. The celebrities this time picked Hugo to do the trial, as he seemed 'up for it'. The trial (named Drown and Out) involved staying in a glass cabin with rising water, unscrewing pipes unleashing creatures to find stars. Though he found it hard (due to his phobia of spiders) he won all eight stars, and was very happy. Ashley and David were sent to Snake Rock for an announcement, and were set as 'Camp Meddlers' (like Anthony & Dougie being Camp Traitors last year). They were set to do a series of tasks, such as persuade Helen, who never did laundry, to do laundry and hiding the mirror. The final (and hardest) one was Ashley waking up in the middle of the night claiming to see a monster, with David backing her up. Also, she had to swap beds with someone (of which she chose Hugo, who didn't mind). In the end, Colin and Eric were announced as the bottom two, and it was announced they would have to take part in a trial to see who would go home.

=== Week 3 ===
| No. | Title | Original release date | Duration |
|---|---|---|---|
| 13 | "Episode 13" | 25 November 2012 | 90 minutes |
Ant and Dec presented the latest action. Colin and Eric battle to keep their place in the jungle in the next trial, 'The Panic Rooms', which was completed by Colin, Charlie, Eric and Rosemary. Charlie supports Colin's bid to stay in the jungle, and Rosemary; Eric's bid. The trial was to put their hands in various holes and pick up small stars (like 'Hell Holes'). They could also pick up big stars, winning meals for camp. They won five out of a possible eight big stars. The result was announced at the end of the show. Meanwhile, Hugo joins Ashley and David as a camp meddler, lying to Rosemary that his father owned a flower shop, lying to Helen that he would inherit £30 million when he turned 30 and telling Eric that he thought he (Hugo) would win. The final challenge for all the meddlers was to teach the whole camp the chorus of the "Don't Cha" dance routine. They lied that if anyone refused, they would not get fed that night. They all did the routine (though Eric was reluctant). Also, in the Dingo Dollars Challenge, Rosemary and Helen had to do an activity, where Helen ran down a hill and Rosemary got the code for the Dingo Dollars. They won, and chose chocolate-coated strawberries as their prize. The celebrities correctly answered the question, winning the strawberries. In the end, it was announced that Eric and Rosemary collected more stars, thus sending Colin home.
| 14 | "Episode 14" | 26 November 2012 | 90 minutes |
Ant and Dec presented the latest action. The celebrities this time picked David to do the trial, as he and Ashley were the only people that wanted to do it. They thought that she may have a disadvantage as she is scared of the dark, and the trial had parts where the celebrity had to be in the dark. The trial (named Cruelty Towers) has already appeared in the show this series in Episode 4, but the celebrity that took part in it (Helen) gave up on the trial within 10 seconds. The trial consisted of going through rooms in hotels (containing creatures) to find stars. David managed to achieve 6 stars out of a possible 7, just failing to find the star in the last room. Helen and Ashley took part in the "Dingo Dollar Challenge". Where they had to sit on toad stalls (whilst dressed as gnomes). One of them had to collect 50 inflatable fish with their fishing rod whilst the other had to hold the lobster cage containing the "Dingo Dollars". They did collect 50 fish but when the cage opened the "Dingo Dollars" fell into the gunge that the fish had been in, so they had to search around for the bag, and eventually they did find them. In this episode we did not see them go to the outback shack but Ant and Dec did tell us that they received salt and pepper. For dinner they received Kangaroo tail much to the dislike of Eric. There was also a dispute between Rosemary and Hugo, after Rosemary felt that Hugo was being disrespectful. In the end, Hugo and Helen were announced as the bottom two and it was then announced that Helen would leave the jungle. In her post-exit interview Helen said that this experience had really changed her life, and that she wanted David to win.
| 15 | "Episode 15" | 27 November 2012 | 90 minutes |
Ant and Dec returned with all the latest jungle action. Eric, whom had been constantly arrogant and rude to other contestants was selected to do the trial, with someone quoting how he had "a lot to live up to". In the new trial (named 'The Great Escape'), Eric had to push himself along in a minecart on his back collecting stars with various distractions. He, unlike other celebrities, remained calm throughout the trial, managing to collect five out of a possible six stars, which the camp agreed was well-done. Meanwhile, Rosemary and Hugo attempted the next Dingo dollars challenge, in which Rosemary bizarrely had to have a bath and Hugo had to sit on top of something. They completed it, and answered the question correctly, thus gaining marshmallows, which the camp hugely enjoyed. There was also a new introduction: The door to door challenge. Each celebrity paired up with another and had to pick one out of five doors; each with a prize behind it (including their family behind one of them). If they did not like the first door, they could pick one more, and then one more. However, one door simply had a "Game Over" sign behind it. Hugo & Ashley won a pizza, which they thoroughly enjoyed. Eric and Charlie won nothing. Rosemary and David opened a door to see their family, which they were pleased with. After the activity, Charlie was distraught to find out that one door had family behind it, as she had been severely missing her daughter. In the end, it was announced that Rosemary and Charlie were the bottom two, and it was then announced Rosemary would leave the jungle. Rosemary announced her favourite moment as the Dingo Dollars challenge she had completed that day.
| 16 | "Episode 16" | 28 November 2012 | 90 minutes |
Ant and Dec present. Ashley and Charlie take on the newest trial, "Hollywood Walk of Shame". The trial consisted of Ashley sitting on a wooden plank above some liquid and answering Hollywood trivia. Getting them right would result in her being "dunked". Also if she got them right, more time would be allocated to Charlie, whom was actually collecting stars throughout various conditions. They received four out of five stars, which they were pleased with. In the new Dingo Dollars Challenge, Hugo and Eric had to listen to a variety of various records, with three of them having a number at the end. Despite Hugo questioning the taste in music, they manage to complete the challenge, but answer the question incorrectly (Who had lost the most weight in camp: Colin or Rosemary?). Each celebrity also received a letter from home; however, it had to be won. Each celebrity was playing for another celebrity's letter on a Buzz wire. Each celebrity was allowed three buzzes before the letter was not won, and was burned. All the celebrities won each other's letters except Eric, who failed and had to burn Hugo's letter, much the disappointment of both of them. In the end, it was announced that Hugo and Eric were the bottom two, and it was then announced Hugo would leave the jungle.
| 17 | "Episode 17" | 29 November 2012 | 90 minutes |
Ant and Dec present. All the celebrities participate in the returned trial, Celebrity Cyclone, in which they all must carry stars to certain points on a wet slope, with various distractions. Eric went first, then Charlie, then Ashley then David. They completed the trial in record time, gaining all the possible stars for the camp, which they were extremely proud of. In the final Dingo Dollars challenge, Ashley and Eric completed the challenge by looking through various haystacks. There were also small treats, like chocolates, hidden in them (which Eric insisted he did not want). They completed the trial and answered the question correctly, gaining corned beef (this was primarily Eric's choice, as Ashley had never tried corned beef). However, Ashley did not like the corned beef, and was slightly disappointed. It is finally revealed that Eric went out missing out on the final three, leaving David, Ashley and Charlie in the jungle.
| 18 | "Episode 18" | 30 November 2012 | 90 minutes |
Ant & Dec present. David again attempts another trial, the "Well of Hell". David has to be lowered down into a well and collect various half-stars from different animals (similar to "Hell Holes") David manages to get all the stars, however he encounters trouble getting one of them, after an angry Bandicoot keeps biting and attacking his hand. The camp were pleased with his efforts. Another favourite at this stage returned: the jungle awards. Ashley, Charlie and David had to nominate a campmate (not present at the time) an award, which were already chosen. Eric and Hugo won six between them, with Eric being "Most Entertaining" and Hugo being "Best dressed". Helen was nominated as the "Most Scared", which no-one seemed to have any doubt about at all. The only campmates not to win an award were Colin and Linda. It was announced at the end that David was eliminated, leaving Charlie and Ashley as the final two.
| 19 | "Episode 19" | 1 December 2012 | 63 minutes |
The final episode. This episode included the quintessential eating trial, where each celebrity had to eat four meals (a starter, main, drink and dessert), in order to win a fully prepared meal in the evening. In this round Ashley had to eat fish eyes amongst other creatures and Charlie had to eat turkey testicles. They both won all the stars and chose to have a Mexican fiesta, which they were very happy with. This year Ant & Dec also announced that voting figures were extremely close, and the celebrity in the lead had now switched. Both celebrities were invited out of the jungle to announce their favourite moments and least favourite moments. Charlie's daughter, Kiki, was then invited on to surprise Charlie, whom was delighted. The final result was announced, with Charlie being crowned Queen of the Jungle 2012 and Ashley being the runner up. Charlie was clearly surprised by this.

== Ratings ==
Official ratings are taken from BARB. There were no shows on 14 and 20 November due to live football, however, the ITV2 show still aired as normal.

| Episode | Date | Official ITV rating (millions) | ITV weekly rank | Official ITV HD rating (millions) | Official ITV +1 rating (millions) | Total ITV viewers (millions) | Share |
|---|---|---|---|---|---|---|---|
| 1 | 11 November | 10.09 | 1 | 1.42 | 0.38 | 11.89 | 40.6% |
| 2 | 12 November | 9.10 | 2 | 1.31 | 0.46 | 10.87 | 37.4% |
| 3 | 13 November | 7.97 | 8 | 1.21 | 0.80 | 9.98 | 32.2% |
| 4 | 15 November | 8.51 | 7 | 1.24 | 0.59 | 10.34 | 34.7% |
| 5 | 16 November | 7.46 | 11 | 1.18 | 0.63 | 9.27 | 28.8% |
| 6 | 17 November | 8.58 | 6 | 1.19 | 0.60 | 10.37 | 36.5% |
| 7 | 18 November | 10.05 | 1 | 1.31 | 0.53 | 11.89 | 38.3% |
| 8 | 19 November | 9.31 | 1 | 1.20 | 0.42 | 10.93 | 38.8% |
| 9 | 21 November | 9.12 | 3 | 1.18 | 0.48 | 10.78 | 36.6% |
| 10 | 22 November | 8.08 | 12 | 0.98 | 0.64 | 9.70 | 31.7% |
| 11 | 23 November | 8.58 | 6 | 1.31 | 0.36 | 10.25 | 36.8% |
| 12 | 24 November | 8.14 | 11 | 1.19 | 0.59 | 9.92 | 36.2% |
| 13 | 25 November | 9.15 | 2 | 1.34 | 0.50 | 10.99 | 36.7% |
| 14 | 26 November | 8.96 | 4 | 1.23 | 0.35 | 10.54 | 36.7% |
| 15 | 27 November | 7.73 | 11 | 1.09 | 0.53 | 9.35 | 29.9% |
| 16 | 28 November | 8.51 | 9 | 1.13 | 0.32 | 9.96 | 35.0% |
| 17 | 29 November | 8.67 | 8 | 1.17 | 0.45 | 10.29 | 35.9% |
| 18 | 30 November | 8.97 | 3 | 1.14 | 0.38 | 10.49 | 41.6% |
| 19 | 1 December | 9.26 | 2 | 1.48 | 0.40 | 11.14 | 40.4% |
| Series average^{1} | 2012 | 8.75 | —N/a | 1.22 | 0.50 | 10.47 | 36.0% |
| Coming Out | 5 December | 6.56 | 12 | 0.84 | 0.45 | 7.85 | 26.3% |

^1 Series averages do not include the Coming Out show.

== Controversy and criticism ==
=== Nadine Dorries' participation ===
Nadine Dorries, a British politician and Conservative MP, was suspended from the parliamentary Conservative Party on 6 November 2012 owing to her decision to take part in I'm a Celebrity...Get Me Out of Here! without informing the Chief Whip. This sparked controversy during her time on the show.

Dorries became the first sitting MP to participate in a reality TV show since George Galloway (in January 2006 on Celebrity Big Brother) by spending up to a month on the show which ran from 11 November to 1 December 2012. Other Conservatives and her constituents were reportedly outraged by the announcement while the Conservative Chief Whip Sir George Young had not been informed of her imminent absence from Parliament. In fact, Dorries did not even inform the chairman of the Mid-Bedfordshire Conservative Association. Tim Montgomerie of the ConservativeHome website speculated that she might manage to "present an image of a Tory MP that defies some of the popular pre-conceptions and caricatures" while Lembit Öpik tweeted: "Good on Nadine Dorries for the jungle if she's really going in. Go gal!" The Conservative Party suspended Dorries from the party whip after her confirmation that she was planning to be absent from Parliament. John Lyon, the Parliamentary Commissioner for Standards, has received a complaint about her behaviour.

=== Helen Flanagan and bushtucker trials ===
On 14 November, Helen Flanagan was voted to complete the bushtucker trial. She had been voted to take part in every trial so far and had failed to win any stars. That day, Helen took on one of the show's most elaborate tasks yet, with a five-room hotel full of bugs for her to navigate around in the search for stars. However, she quit within minutes and failed to make it past the first room, returning to camp with no stars and therefore no food apart from basic rations.

Get Me Out of Here! NOW! host Whitmore claimed that the show's team weren't happy with Helen's "diva antics". She said: "Ant and Dec have lost patience with her and I think most of the crew hate her since she bailed out of the Bug Burial Trial," she told The Sun. She explained: "Months of preparation, health and safety checks goes into those trials. So to do all that and have Helen walk away after just ten seconds is annoying.". However Cruelty Towers was again featured on 26 November episode where David Haye took part in.

=== Brian Conley's withdrawal ===
Following Brian Conley's withdrawal from the show on medical grounds, there was widespread criticism of the decision to allow him on the show, when he had a history of depression and other health problems. Before his withdrawal, Brian had been behaving in an emotional manner. ITV defended their decision, with a spokesman saying: "All contestants are assessed by independent medical experts before contracts are signed and again before entering the jungle. We also have contact where necessary with the celebrities' GPs. Medical personnel are also available 24 hours a day in Australia to provide support if needed."
