= That Antony Cotton Show =

- Genre: Entertainment chat show
- Presented by: Antony Cotton
- Country of origin: United Kingdom
- No. of series: 1
- No. of episodes: 25

Production
- Producer: ITV Productions
- Running time: 60 minutes

Original release
- Network: ITV (not UTV)
- Release: 13 August – 17 September 2007

That Antony Cotton Show is a British comedy chat show that was broadcast on ITV1 and STV for one series in 2007. It was presented by Coronation Street actor Antony Cotton and aired on weekdays at 5pm. The show was filmed in front of a live audience at the ITV Granada studios in Manchester.

That Antony Cotton Show launched with 2 million viewers (17.6% share of available audience) at 5pm on Monday 13 August 2007. This was significantly up on the slot average of 1.7 million viewers (12.9%). It also attracted more than Channel 4's flagship daytime show, Richard & Judy, which pulled in just 1.1 million viewers (9.7%) at the same time. However, by its third episode, the show had lost 500,000 viewers, drawing 1.5 million and a 13% share. Viewership continued to fall further for Cotton's show. On 24 August 2007, only 1.1 million (11.5%) tuned in. The show's viewership slumped to below 1.1 million (10.4%) on 11 September 2007.

The last episode aired on 17 September 2007. Initial reports suggested that the show had been recommissioned for a second run, with producers saying they would alter the format for the new series. However, it was announced on 24 January 2008 that the show had been axed after just one series.

== Episodes ==
Date	Guests
Pilot	Pauline Quirke, Marsha Thomason and Neil Ruddock
13 August	Alison Steadman and Ray Quinn
14 August	Charlie Hardwick and Stephen Mulhern
15 August	Kate O'Mara and Dave Spikey
16 August	Linda Robson, Dannii Minogue and Rustie Lee
17 August	Claire King and Ricky Hatton
20 August	Kym Ryder and Patrick Mower
21 August	Fay Ripley, Anne Charleston and Lizzie Webb
22 August	Dame Kelly Holmes and Ian Kelsey
23 August	Richard Briers and Yvette Fielding
24 August	Tricia Penrose and Malcolm Hebden
27 August	Denise Welch and Jennie McAlpine
28 August	Ardal O'Hanlon and Katherine Jenkins
29 August	Brian Blessed and Natalie Imbruglia
30 August	Brian Conley and Denise Black
31 August	Wendy Turner Webster, Gary Webster, Lee Sharpe and Katherine Kelly
3 September	Suranne Jones and Daniel O'Donnell
4 September	Anthea Turner and Jean-Christophe Novelli
5 September	Sally Whittaker, Les Dennis and RyanDan
6 September	Nicki Chapman and Geoffrey Hughes
10 September	Wendy Richard and Cleo Rocos
11 September	June Whitfield and Richard Fleeshman
12 September	John Thomson, Mickey Rooney and Jan Rooney
13 September	Emma Samms and Laurence Llewelyn-Bowen
17 September	Shayne Ward and Lynda La Plante
