= Harry Derbidge =

English television personality (born 1994)

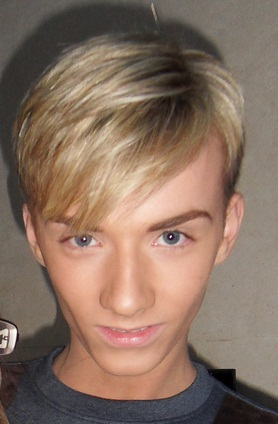
- Derbidge in 2012
- Born: Harry Eric Derbidge; 3 April 1994 (age 31); Barking, London, England
- Occupation: Television personality
- Years active: 2006–present
- Television: The Only Way Is Essex
- Relatives: Amy Childs (cousin)

Harry Eric Derbidge (born 3 April 1994) is an English television personality, known for being an original cast member on the ITVBe reality series The Only Way Is Essex, having appeared from 2010 to 2011, 2014 and from 2020 onwards.

== Early life ==
Harry Eric Derbidge was born on 3 April 1994 in Barking, London. He attended Jo Richardson Community School and Sylvia Young Theatre School. Prior to reality television, Derbidge played the part of one of Barney's kids in a UK tour of Barney & Friends and portrayed a young David Beckham in the same the Channel 4 comedy programme Star Stories.

== Career ==
=== The Only Way Is Essex ===
In 2010, aged 16, Derbidge became an original cast member of the ITVBe reality series The Only Way Is Essex, alongside his cousin Amy Childs whom he shared the majority of his scenes with. Following Childs' departure from the series, Derbidge featured less frequently in the show and departed at the end of the third series in 2011. Derbidge returned for the twelfth series in 2014, which focused on the breakdown of his relationship with Bobby Norris, after he cheated on him with a former boyfriend. He did not return for the thirteenth series.

In 2020, it was announced that Derbidge would be returning to The Only Way Is Essex after six years, making his return in the twenty-sixth series, alongside Childs. He has appeared regularly in the series since.

=== Other ventures ===
In 2011, he appeared alongside fellow The Only Way Is Essex cast members on Ghosthunting With.... From 2011 to 2012, Derbidge appeared in his cousin's reality series It's All About Amy on Channel 5 and in 2012, Derbidge and Childs appeared on Let's Dance for Sport Relief in which they performed as Britney Spears and Madonna respectively to their song "Me Against the Music".

In 2018, Derbidge made an appearance in Gemma Collins' reality series Gemma Collins: Diva España.

Outside of television, Derbidge works as a make-up artist and previously worked behind a MAC Cosmetics counter at Harrods.

== Personal life ==
Derbidge is gay. During interviews on Loose Women and This Morning, Derbidge revealed he had battled with a phobia of food and once weighed 7st (98lbs).

== Filmography ==
Year	Title	Role	Notes
2006	Star Stories	Young David Beckham	Episode: "David & Victoria: Our Story"
2010–2011, 2014, 2020–present	The Only Way Is Essex	Himself	Series regular
2010	Greatest Christmas TV Ads	Himself	Documentary
2011	Most Shocking Talent Show Moments	Himself	Documentary
2011	50 Greatest Harry Potter Moments	Himself	Documentary
2011, 2013	This Morning	Himself	Guest; 3 episodes
2011–2012	Big Brother's Bit on the Side	Himself	Guest; 3 episodes
2011–2012, 2017, 2020	Loose Women	Himself	Guest; 4 episodes
2011–2012	Daybreak	Himself	Guest; 2 episodes
2011	OK! TV	Himself	Guest; 2 episodes
2011–2012	It's All About Amy	Himself	Series regular
2012	Let's Dance for Sport Relief	Himself	Participant
2012	The Boyle Variety Performance	Himself	1 episode
2013	Celebrity Wedding Planner	Himself	1 episode
2020	Celebs Go Dating	Himself	1 episode
2023	CelebAbility	Himself	1 episode
