= Surrey Hills (TV series) =

- Genre: Reality
- Starring: Charlie Pothecary; Sam Steen; Alan Watts; Talia Janson; Benny Rose; Alexandra; Hannah
- Country of origin: United Kingdom
- Original language: English
- No. of series: 1
- No. of episodes: 8

Production
- Running time: 45 Min Episodes

Related
- The Only Way Is Essex; It's All About Amy; Mark Wright's Hollywood Nights; The Hills; Geordie Shore; Made in Chelsea; Desperate Scousewives

Surrey Hills was to be a reality TV show set in Surrey, England, but it was canned in early production.

Filming was to take place in the affluent Surrey towns of Weybridge, Esher, Cobham, Leatherhead and other locations around Elmbridge and Mole Valley as well as Reigate. Comparisons had been drawn to other "docusoaps" following wealthy individuals such as The Only Way Is Essex and Made in Chelsea, but it never made the cut.

== Cast ==
Cast member	Age	Residence	Notes
Benny Rose	28	Chessington, Surrey	Stockbroker. Educated at Hinchley Wood School.
Charlie Pothecary	40	St George's Hill, Weybridge	Broker and musician. Educated at University of the West of England and Canford School.
Talia Janson	32	Esher	Singer/songwriter. Educated at Epsom College and Danes Hill School.
Sam Steen	23	St. George's Hill, Weybridge	Property developer.
Alan Watts	27	Cobham	Supercar dealer. Educated at Reed's School.

== Filming ==
Filming was set to take place around the home towns of the main cast around Elmbridge including, Esher, Cobham, Weybridge, Leatherhead and other locations in Surrey where various events would take place.
