= Tour de Celeb =

- Genre: Cycling, entertainment, reality series
- Country of origin: United Kingdom
- Original language: English
- No. of series: 1
- No. of episodes: 4

Production
- Running time: 60 minutes

Original release
- Network: Channel 5
- Release: 28 November – 19 December 2016

Tour de Celeb is a Channel 5 cycling-based reality series.

The narrator of the series is Rick Edwards.

== Transmissions ==
Series	Start date	End date	Episodes
1	28 November 2016	19 December 2016	4

== Trainers ==
- Rob Hayles
- Dame Sarah Storey
- Asker Jeukendrup

== Celebrities ==
=== Series 1 (2016) ===
Celebrity	Known for
Jodie Kidd	Fashion model and television personality
Darren Gough	England cricketer and TalkSport presenter
Lucy Mecklenburgh	Glamour model, actress and entrepreneur
Hugo Taylor	Co-creator and co-star of Made in Chelsea
Austin Healey	England rugby union player
Amy Williams	Winter Olympic gold medallist
Angellica Bell	Television and radio presenter
Louie Spence	Dancer, choreographer and television personality
