= Jo Richardson Community School =

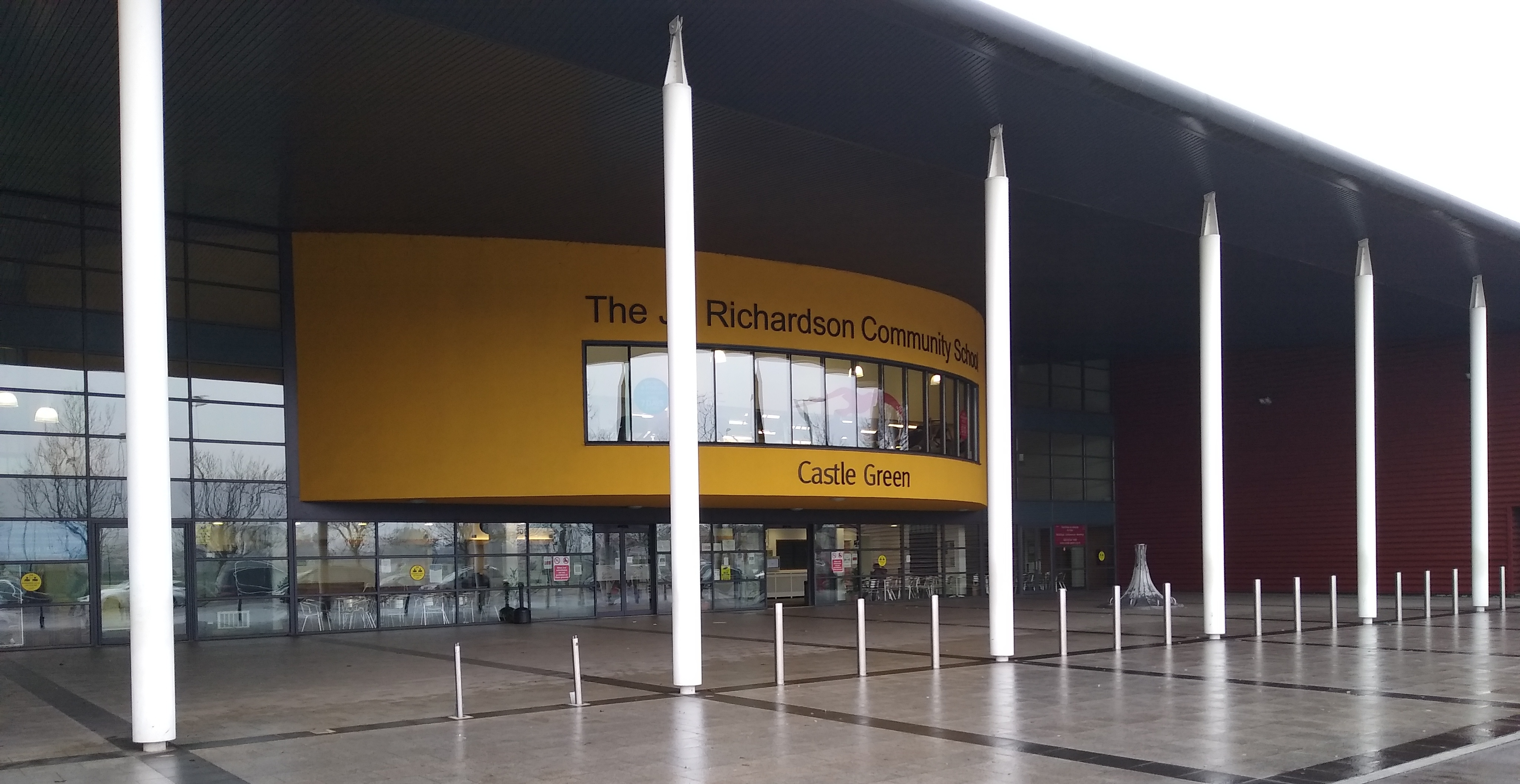

Location
- Gale Street; Castle Green; Dagenham, RM9 4UN; England
- 51.53335°N 0.12642°E

Information
- Type: Community school
- Motto: Success for All
- Religious affiliation: none
- Established: 2002
- Local authority: Barking and Dagenham
- Department for Education URN: 133561 Tables
- Ofsted: Reports
- Head teacher: Lisa Keane
- Gender: Coeducational
- Age: 11 to 18
- Enrolment: 1,699
- Website: www.jorichardson.org.uk

The Jo Richardson Community School, often referred to as Jo Richardson or simply JRCS, is a secondary school in Dagenham, East London. The school is named in honour of MP Jo Richardson.

== Notable alumni ==
- Ronkẹ Adékọluẹ́jọ́ (born 1991/92), actress
- Benik Afobe (born 1993), footballer
- Harry Derbidge (born 1994), television personality
- Jesy Nelson (born 1991), singer
