= Rustie Lee =

British-Jamaican chef, actor and musician (born 1949)

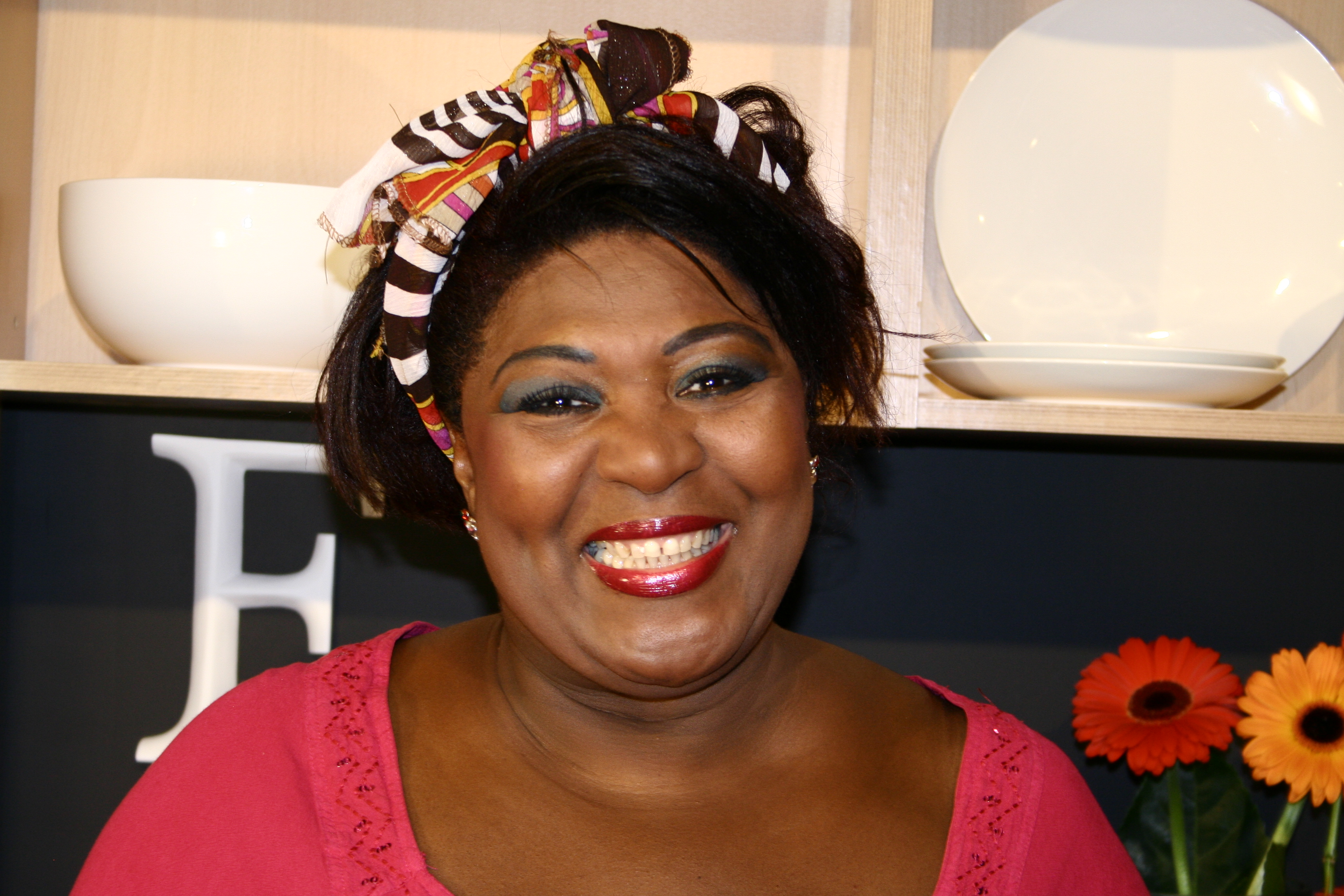
- Born: Jeane Carole Lees; 22 May 1949 (age 77); Portland, Jamaica
- Occupations: Television personality, chef, actress, singer, politician
- Years active: 1983–present
- Political party: UKIP (2004–09)
- Website: rustielee.co.uk

Jeane Carole Lees (born 22 May 1949), known professionally as Rustie Lee, is a British-Jamaican television personality, television chef, actress and singer. She participated on the Channel 5 reality-television show Celebrity Super Spa in 2013; ITV's Who's Doing the Dishes?, hosted by Brian McFadden, in 2016; and Celebrity Coach Trip in 2020. Between 2015 and 2017 Rustie also appeared on children's BBC TV programme Twirlywoos.

== Early life ==
Rustie Lee was born Jeane Carole Lees in Portland, Jamaica on 22 May 1949. Aged 4, she and her parents later relocated to England, where she attended the girls' grammar school King Edward VI Handsworth School.

== Broadcasting career ==
Lee first came to public attention for her appearances during the 1980s on the morning television station TV-am. Following her initial successful period as a chef on TV-am in 1983, Lee took over from Sarah Kennedy on the second incarnation of the ITV gameshow Game for a Laugh.

In 2004, Lee appeared on Livings I'm Famous and Frightened! 2, a reality show featuring a number of celebrities staying in a castle over a weekend, taking part in various challenges and looking for paranormal activity, guided by a medium. Viewers voted for their favourite star, and the celebrities were voted off one by one. Lee won the series showing a keen interest in the tasks and occasional emotional involvement, giving detailed and varied accounts of how she felt at certain points.

In recent years, she has made occasional appearances on This Morning, The Alan Titchmarsh Show and Daily Cooks/Saturday Cooks. She has also made appearances on That Antony Cotton Show, The Wright Stuff, Loose Women, Would I Lie To You?, and Channel 5's Big Brother's Bit on the Side, a spin-off chat show for Big Brother. She also appeared on the Channel 5 reality show Celebrity Super Spa.

== Politics ==
In 2004, Lee joined the UK Independence Party (UKIP), and was adopted as their candidate for the Wyre Forest constituency in the 2005 general election. She also appeared in the party's election broadcast that year. On polling day, she came fifth, with 1,074 votes (2.3% of the total).

Lee stood for UKIP for the 2009 European Elections in the West Midlands constituency in June 2009, but was not elected.

=== General election contested ===
Date of election	Constituency	Party	Votes	%
2005	Wyre Forest	UKIP	1,074	2.3

== Other activities ==
Lee has written several cookbooks, including Rustie Lee's Caribbean Cookbook (1985) and A Taste of the Caribbean (2007).

In 2008, Lee briefly joined the cast of EastEnders as Gus Smith's aunt Opal Smith. She also appeared briefly in Peter Kay's Britain's Got the Pop Factor... and Possibly a New Celebrity Jesus Christ Soapstar Superstar Strictly on Ice. She appeared in the last episode of Benidorm Series 6 as Queenie. She also narrated children's stories for BBC Radio in Birmingham.

Lee has recorded as a singer. In 1985, she released the album Invitation to Party, including her cover versions of "Barbados" and "My Toot Toot". In 1994, she released a further single, "You'd Better Phone", paired with a B side cover of Don't Stop (Wiggle Wiggle) by The Outhere Brothers She also sang on a number of her appearances on Big Brother's Bit on the Side.

Lee has appeared in several pantomime productions including Jack and the Beanstalk, Aladdin, Snow White and the Seven Dwarfs and Peter Pan among others. In 1988 she appeared in the musical Ain't Misbehavin' at the Library Theatre in Manchester alongside disco singer Miquel Brown.

== Filmography ==
Year	Title	Type	Role	Notes
1983–1989, 1991	TV-am/Good Morning Britain 1983	TV	Herself	Chef and Cookery Expert
1984–1985	Game for a Laugh	TV	Herself	Presenter/Host
1984	Punchlines	TV	Herself	2 Episodes
1986–1989	Blankety Blank	TV	Herself	4 Episodes
1997	Harry Hill	TV	Herself	1 Episode
1999	Mad Cows	Film	Mama Joy	
2001	Doctors	TV	Joan Preston	1 Episode, Episode Titled: "Hot Pants"
2004	I'm Famous and Frightened!	TV	Herself	Series 2 Contestant, Winner
2005	The Alan Titchmarsh Show	TV	Herself	1 Episode
2005	18 Stone of Idiot	TV	Herself	1 Episode
2007	That Antony Cotton Show	TV	Herself	1 Episode
2008	The Wright Stuff	TV	Herself	1 Episode, Panelist
2008	Ant & Dec's Saturday Night Takeaway	TV	Herself	1 episode
2008–2009	Loose Women	TV	Herself	3 Episodes
2008	EastEnders	TV	Opal	2 Episodes
2008–2009	Mist: Sheepdog Tales	TV	Effie Heifer/Sandra Sow	3 Episodes
2008	Peter Kay's Britain's Got the Pop Factor... and Possibly a New Celebrity Jesus Christ Soapstar Superstar Strictly on Ice	TV	Herself	
2012–2013,2016–	This Morning	TV	Herself	2 Episodes, Chef
2012–2014	Big Brother's Bit on the Side	TV	Herself	Guest, 17 Episodes
2013	Celebrity Big Brother	TV	Herself	Day 8
2013	Celebrity Super Spa	TV	Herself	Contestant, 6 Episodes
2013, 2016	Pointless Celebrities	TV	Herself	1 Episode, 1980s Special
2014	Benidorm	TV	Queenie	1 Episode
2015	Good Morning Britain 2014	Guest	Herself	1 Episode
2015–	Clean and Dirty	Herself	Presenter	Role
2016	Who's Doing the Dishes?	TV	Herself Participant	Series 3 Episode 27
2017-2019	Twirlywoos	TV	Narrator	Series 1–3, All Episodes
2017	The Real Marigold Hotel	TV	Herself	Series 2, 4 Episodes
2019	Tipping Point: Lucky Stars	TV	Herself	Series 6, 1 Episode, Christmas Special
2019	Tenable All Stars (Christmas Special)	TV	Herself	1 Episode, Christmas Special
2020	Celebrity Coach Trip	TV	Herself	7 Episodes
2021	Celebrity Gogglebox	TV	Herself	Series 3 Episode 9 (Black To Front Special)
2022	Fame in the Family	TV	Herself	Celebrity dinner party host
2023	The 1970s Dinner Party	TV	Herself	Chef
2024	Michael Mcintyre's Big Show	TV	Herself	Series 7 Episode 4
2024	Would I Lie to You?	TV	Herself	Christmas Special
