= Antony Cotton =

English actor (born 1975)

Antony Cotton MBE
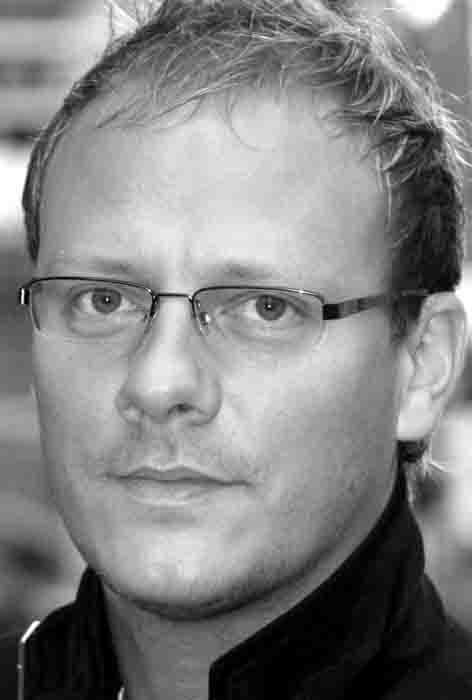
- Cotton in 2006
- Born: Antony Dunn; 5 August 1975 (age 51); Bury, Greater Manchester, England
- Occupations: Actor; comedian
- Years active: 1994–present
- Known for: Role of Sean Tully in Coronation Street

Antony Cotton (born Antony Dunn; 5 August 1975) is an English actor and comedian, known for playing Sean Tully in Coronation Street, as well as Alexander Perry in the original Queer as Folk series. In 2007, Cotton hosted his own talk show titled That Antony Cotton Show, which was cancelled after one series. In March 2013, he won Let's Dance for Comic Relief.

== Early life ==
Cotton was born Antony Dunn in Bury, Greater Manchester, the son of actress Enid Dunn. He attended Woodhey High School at Holcombe Brook, Ramsbottom, and the Oldham Theatre Workshop. He has an elder brother, Andrew.

== Career ==
Cotton portrays barman and factory worker Sean Tully on Coronation Street, a role which he has played since 2003. His mother, Enid Dunn, also played several parts in Coronation Street between 2002 and 2014. Cotton played "Alexander" in the original UK version of Queer as Folk. He has also appeared in episodes of Absolutely Fabulous as "Damon". In 2007, Cotton won the second series of ITV's Soapstar Superstar. He donated his winning money, £200,000, to the Elton John Aids Foundation.

In July 2007, it was announced that Cotton would be fronting his own teatime chat show on ITV. The show, That Antony Cotton Show, was filmed with a live studio audience at Granada Television studios in Manchester, and combined celebrity chat with topical humour. It was first broadcast on 13 August 2007. Following the end of the first series, ITV announced that the show was axed and would not return for a second series. He appeared on Family Fortunes on 20 September 2008 winning £10,000 for his chosen charity. In December 2008, he appeared with co-star Suranne Jones on Who Wants to Be a Millionaire?.

He also took part in the eleventh series of I'm a Celebrity...Get Me Out of Here! which began airing on 13 November 2011. He left on 2 December 2011, after 21 days in the jungle, placing fourth. Cotton also starred in an episode of Mad Mad World on ITV1 in Spring 2012. He won first place in a series of Let's Dance for Comic Relief in March 2013. Cotton was a contestant for the 2018 revamp of Dancing on Ice.

Cotton made his film debut opposite Daniel Craig and Derek Jacobi in the 1998 film Love Is the Devil: Study for a Portrait of Francis Bacon. He also appeared in the 1998 film, The Wisdom of Crocodiles. Cotton has appeared in several shows at the Oldham Coliseum, including The Fifteen Streets and The Hobbit at Manchester's Palace Theatre and Opera House. He appeared in Snow White and the Seven Dwarfs at the Middlesbrough Theatre.

== Personal life ==
Cotton supports the Terrence Higgins Trust and is a patron of the LGBT Foundation, The Albert Kennedy Trust and the 'Queer Up North' festival.

In August 2009, it was reported in Digital Spy that Cotton is "openly gay". In March 2010, it was reported that Cotton had exchanged rings with his partner, Peter Eccleston. In January 2012, footballer Michael Ball was fined by the Football Association for a homophobic rant on Twitter about Cotton.

Cotton is an Ambassador for the Soldiers, Sailors, Airmen and Families Association (SSAFA) Armed Forces charity and a Patron of Help for Heroes.

== Honours, awards and recognition ==
In 2005, Cotton won the Most Popular Newcomer category at the National Television Awards for his role in Coronation Street. Cotton won the 2005 Inside Soap Awards for Best Newcomer and Funniest Performance. In 2006, he won the award for Funniest Performance. At the 2007 British Soap Awards, Cotton was awarded the Best Actor award, which was voted for by the public. Also in 2007 he won Best Actor at the Inside Soap Awards.

Cotton was appointed Member of the Order of the British Empire (MBE) in the 2022 Birthday Honours for services to the British Army, personnel and veterans.

== Filmography ==
Film

Year	Title	Role	Notes
1998	Love Is the Devil: Study for a Portrait of Francis Bacon	Brighton Rent Boy	
1998	The Wisdom of Crocodiles	Gang Member	

Television

Year	Title	Role	Episodes
1995	Ain't Misbehavin'	Pizza Man	Season 2, episode 5
1998	The Cops	Lad in Club	Season 1, episode 4
1999	Love in the 21st Century	Michael	Unknown
1999–2000	Queer as Folk	Alexander Perry	7 episodes
2000	Rhona	Alex	"The Happy Jeans"
2000	The Bill	Georgie Girl	"Old Enemies" "New Friends"
2001	Absolutely Fabulous	Damon	"Parallox" "Menopause"
2002	Having It Off	Guy La Trousse	All 6 episodes
2003	Burn It	Stephen	Unknown
2003–present	Coronation Street	Sean Tully	Series regular
2004	Children in Need	Drinker/Policeman	2 episodes
2005	Twisted Tales	Sam	"Charlie's Angel"
2005	Coronation Street: Pantomime	Aladdin	Television film
2007	That Antony Cotton Show	Presenter	25 episodes
2010	East Street	Sean Tully	Charity crossover between Coronation Street and EastEnders

== See also ==
- List of Dancing on Ice contestants
- List of I'm a Celebrity...Get Me Out of Here! (British TV series) contestants

Preceded by Rowland Rivron	Winner of Let's Dance for Comic Relief; 2013	Succeeded by Programme Finished
