= List of It's All About Amy episodes =

The following is a list of episodes for the British fly on the wall reality television series, It's All About Amy:

In 2011/12, eight episodes of It's All About Amy aired.

== Episodes ==
No.	Title	Directed by	Original release date
1	Episode 1	Mitch Baker	1 December 2011
Amy Childs, an English model, beautician, reality star and television presenter from Essex who rose to fame after appearing on the British reality television series, The Only Way is Essex, invites cameras to film her everyday life. Amy introduces and discusses her family, her friends, and cousin and TOWIE co-star, Harry Derbidge. Amy goes in search for outfits for an award show and looks at possible locations for her dream salon. Drew, Amy's road manager, takes Amy and her dog to a training camp run by a police dog trainer.
2	Episode 2	Mitch Baker	8 December 2011
Amy is close to signing the lease on her new beauty salon, but a major setback occurs. Amy has a business meeting with potential beauty suppliers about a massage table to be made exclusively for Amy's salon that would be more accommodating for women. Amy attends the Kensington Olympia Beauty Expo, to choose which products will appear in her new venture and later, she and cousin Harry attend The Butterfly Ball. Amy also goes horse ridding, which she hasn't done since age 11. Meanwhile, Amy's florist father Billy and brother Billy Jr. are hard at work selling flowers at the Brentwood market. Later, Billy Jr. has a singing gig at a bar in Bromford, but a disappointed Amy can't make it as she is making a guest TV appearance on Big Brother's Bit on the Side.
3	Episode 3	Mitch Baker	15 December 2011
Amy goes on holiday to Dubai with manager Claire and road manager Drew. Amy puts her horse ridding skills to the test when she goes for a ride on a camel and even indulges in some belly dancing. Meanwhile, Amy receives some good news from the UK when Julie rings to tell her that the lease on her new beauty salon has been agreed. When Amy returns home, she gets stuck back into work and makes a personal appearance at a popular Essex nightclub. Amy's mum, Julie surprises Amy with a girly bedroom makeover. Finally, Amy, accompanied by her hand-picked salon staff, attends a beauty course and debates the details of the sign for the salon.
4	Episode 4	Mitch Baker	22 December 2011
Amy and cousin Harry get ready to attend the Pride of Britain Awards, while discussing who is the most orange. The Childs family receive some good news after a week of worry when pet Pugsy is allowed home from the vet, fully recovered from an eye infection. When Amy needs to get some advice on her salon, she heads off to Chigwell to meet with an old friend, mentor and former boss, Sharon. Meanwhile, Amy and her mum Julie attend the Zumba-thon at Alexandra Palace in aid of a breast cancer charity. Also, Amy's brother Billy Jr. lends some moral support when Amy makes an appearance at an Essex nightclub and is asked to judge a pole dancing competition.
5	Episode 5	Mitch Baker	29 December 2011
Amy continues to make media commitments and a television appearance throws her into the lion's den on the popular music show Never Mind The Buzzcocks.
6	Episode 6	Mitch Baker	12 January 2012
Amy lends a hand in the Childs family's fireworks shop, but two queues form – one for sparklers and the other for Amy's autograph. Amy then heads off to West Sussex to support Peter André, her showbiz pal who is opening his own cafe. With the big opening day fast approaching, Amy pops by the salon to make sure things are running on schedule. Meanwhile, mum Julie decides it's time for mother and daughter to have some fun and they head of to Milton Keynes and have a crack at indoor skydiving. Also, Amy's 2012 calendar hits the shelves and she heads off to Bluewater Shopping Centre to meet and greet fans and sign some autographs. Amy, and cousin Harry are given a special treat when they are offered a private box to watch West Ham play and even the chance to walk on Upton Park’s hallowed turf.
7	Episode 7	Mitch Baker	19 January 2012
The launch of the beauty salon is fast approaching, but with only a couple of days left to go, Amy is worried that there is still much more work to do.
8	Episode 8	Mitch Baker	26 January 2012
Amy meets the Prime Minister on the set of This Morning. Amy takes a working holiday in Los Angeles and it's her first visit to the city. Meanwhile, Amy and her stylist, Jade, take an open-top bus tour to see the homes of the stars. Also, Amy films her very own fitness video.
