= Hugo Taylor =

British TV personality

- Born: 1 June 1986 (age 40); Chelsea, London, England
- Education: Harrow School
- Years active: 2011–present
- Spouse: Millie Mackintosh (m. 2018; div. 2026)
- Children: 2

Hugo Taylor (born 1 June 1986) is a British reality television star, best known for his appearance in the reality show, Made in Chelsea. Taylor has also appeared on other reality shows such as the twelfth series of I'm a Celebrity... Get Me Out of Here!

== Career ==
Taylor began his career in 2011, starring in the reality show Made in Chelsea. He left the show in June 2012, stating that he had 'outgrown the show'. That same year, he competed in the twelfth series of I'm a Celebrity... Get Me Out of Here, where he finished in 5th place.

He later appeared in the celebrity editions of other shows including, Come Dine with Me, Dinner Date, Celebrity Wedding Planner and Tour de Celeb.

== Personal life ==
In June 2018, Taylor married fellow Made in Chelsea star, Millie Mackintosh. Together, they had two daughters. They have since separated.
