= It's All About Amy =

British television series (2011–2012)

- Genre: Fly on the wall Reality television
- Directed by: Mitch Baker
- Starring: Amy Childs; Billy Childs; Julie Childs; Billy Childs Jr. Harry Derbidge; Drew; Claire Powell
- Narrated by: Fay Ripley
- Country of origin: United Kingdom
- Original language: English
- No. of series: 1
- No. of episodes: 8 (list of episodes)

Production
- Executive producers: Brent Baker; Danny Fenton
- Producer: Mitch Baker
- Running time: 60 minutes (including adverts)

Original release
- Network: Channel 5
- Release: 1 December 2011 – 26 January 2012

It's All About Amy is a British fly on the wall reality television series based on the life of Amy Childs, her family and friends that began airing on 1 December 2011 on Channel 5 as part of an 8-part series. Channel 5 cancelled It's All About Amy on 26 January 2012 due to low ratings.

== Cast ==
Cast member	Notes
Amy Childs	An English model, beautician, reality television contestant and television personality from Essex who rose to fame after appearing on the British reality television series The Only Way is Essex.
Billy Childs	Amy's father and Brentwood market florist.
Julie Childs	Amy's mother and former hairdresser
Billy Childs Jr.	Amy's brother and singer.
Harry Derbidge	Amy's cousin and regular of The Only Way is Essex.
Drew	Childs' road manager and escorts her to most of her engagements.
Claire Powell	Childs' manager and friend.

== Series ==
The series takes place in 2011 after Childs has left the Big Brother house and begins investing in many businesses, including her salon. The series also shows Childs as she continues to model and present on television. Childs' mother Julie, father Billy and brother Billy Jr. appear, along with manager Claire Powell. Cousin and The Only Way is Essex regular Harry Derbidge also appears in the series.

== Ratings ==
Episode viewing figures from BARB.

Episode No.	Airdate	Total viewers	Channel 5 weekly ranking	Ref(s)
1	1 December 2011	506,000	Outside Top 30	
2	8 December 2011	476,000	Outside Top 30	
3	15 December 2011	494,000	Outside Top 30	
4	22 December 2011	TBA	TBA	
5	29 December 2011	398,000	Outside Top 30	
6	12 January 2012	TBA	TBA	
7	19 January 2012	TBA	TBA	
8	26 January 2012	TBA	TBA	
