= Amy Childs =

English television personality and model (born 1990)

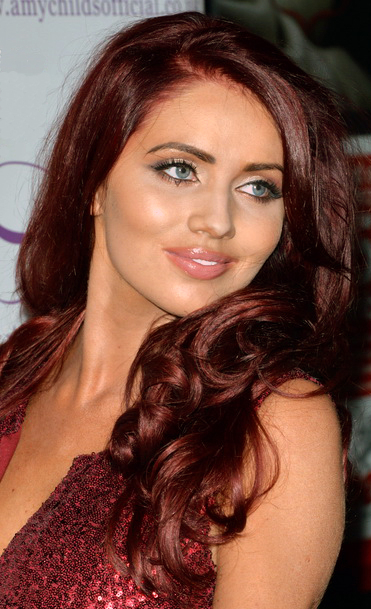
- Childs in 2014
- Born: Amy Andrea Childs; 7 June 1990 (age 36); Barking, London, England
- Occupations: Television personality; model
- Years active: 2010–present
- Television: The Only Way Is Essex; It's All About Amy; Celebrity Big Brother; The Jump; Celebs Go Dating
- Spouse: Billy Delbosq (m. 2026)
- Children: 4
- Relatives: Harry Derbidge (cousin)

Amy Andrea Delbosq (née Childs; born 7 June 1990) is an English model and television personality. After appearing in the first two series of the ITV2 reality series The Only Way Is Essex, she starred in her own fly on the wall reality series It's All About Amy from 2011 to 2012. Childs then came in fourth place in the Channel 5 series Celebrity Big Brother 8 in 2011; in 2014, she participated in the Channel 4 series The Jump. Childs returned to The Only Way Is Essex in 2020.

== Early life ==
Childs was born on 7 June 1990 in Barking, London, and later relocated to Brentwood, Essex. She attended Raphael Independent School, where she served as head girl, and left the school with four GCSE qualifications.

== Career ==
Childs rose to fame in 2010 after appearing in the ITV2 reality series The Only Way Is Essex. She later signed to Can Associates management agency. As a model, she has posed for the fashion magazine British Vogue. Childs put her name to a ghost-written column for New! magazine, and presented a regular fashion segment on the ITV series This Morning. In July 2011, she was named Personality of the Year at the National Reality TV Awards.

From December 2011 to January 2012, Childs appeared in her own reality series, titled It's All About Amy, broadcast on Channel 5. The series was cancelled after one series due to low ratings. In February 2012, Childs competed in an episode of Let's Dance for Sport Relief alongside cousin Harry Derbidge. She later participated in a celebrity special of The Bank Job on Channel 4 in March 2012. In 2020, Childs was a main cast member on the eighth series of the E4 reality programme Celebs Go Dating. Later that year, it was announced that she would be returning to The Only Way Is Essex after nine years, making her return in the twenty-sixth series, alongside cousin Harry Derbridge.

== Personal life ==
Childs was in a relationship with builder Bradley Wright from 2013 to 2017. She gave birth to their daughter in 2017, but they separated shortly after the birth. Childs had her second child in 2018.

In 2021, she began dating Billy Delbosq, a cast member from First Dates; they married in 2026. In 2023, she gave birth to their twins.

Childs has dyslexia.

== Filmography ==
As herself
| Year | Title | Notes |
|---|---|---|
| 2010–2011, 2020–present | The Only Way Is Essex | Series regular |
| 2011 | Celebrity Big Brother | Housemate; fourth place |
| 2011 | Never Mind the Buzzcocks | Series 25, episode 6 |
| 2011 | 8 Out of 10 Cats | Series 11, episode 3 |
| 2011–2012 | It's All About Amy | Main role |
| 2011–2013 | Big Brother's Bit on the Side | Panelist; 22 episodes |
| 2013 | Sooty | Herself; episode: "Fitness Funatic" |
| 2014 | The Jump | Finished in 11th Place |
| 2014 | Celebrity Dinner Date | Series 4, episode 8 |
| 2014 | Birds of a Feather | Series 10, episode 2 |
| 2018 | Star Boot Sale | Series 1, episode 7 |
| 2020 | Celebs Go Dating | Main cast |
| 2023 | Amy Childs: The Twin Life | Main cast |

== See also ==
- Vajazzle
